= Brian Pinho =

American ice hockey player (born 1995)

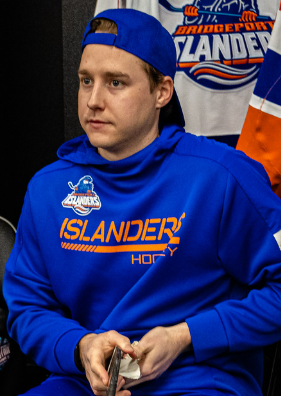
- Pinho with the Bridgeport Islanders in 2025
- Born: May 11, 1995 (age 31) North Andover, Massachusetts, U. S.
- Height: 6 ft 1 in (185 cm)
- Weight: 190 lb (86 kg; 13 st 8 lb)
- Position: Center
- Shoots: Right
- AHL team Former teams: Charlotte Checkers; Washington Capitals
- NHL draft: 174th overall, 2013; Washington Capitals
- Playing career: 2018–present

Brian Pinho (born May 11, 1995) is an American professional ice hockey center for the Charlotte Checkers of the American Hockey League (AHL). He was drafted 174th overall, in the sixth round of the 2013 NHL entry draft by the Washington Capitals.

== Playing career ==
Pinho played college hockey for the Providence Friars and was part of the team that won the 2015 NCAA Division I Men's Ice Hockey Tournament. He made his NHL debut on August 16, 2020, in a Stanley Cup playoffs game against the New York Islanders.

On September 17, 2020, the Washington Capitals signed Pinho to a two-year contract extension.

As a free agent from the Capitals, Pinho was signed one-year, two-way contract with the New Jersey Devils on July 13, 2022. In his lone season within the Devils organization in 2022–23, Pinho played exclusively with AHL affiliate, the Utica Comets, collecting 10 goals and 28 points in 53 regular season games.

Pinho was signed as a free agent to a one-year, two-way contract with the New York Islanders for the 2023–24 season on July 5, 2023. He was assigned to AHL affiliate, the Bridgeport Islanders for the duration of his contract with New York, posting 34 points through 72 regular season games.

As a free agent, Pinho opted to remain within the Islanders organization, signing a one-year AHL contract to continue with Bridgeport on July 3, 2024.

Following two seasons within the Islanders organization, Pinho left at the conclusion of his contract and continued his tenure in the AHL by signing a two-year deal with the Charlotte Checkers, affiliate to the Florida Panthers, on July 2, 2025.

== Career statistics ==
			Regular season					Playoffs
Season	Team	League	GP	G	A	Pts	PIM	GP	G	A	Pts	PIM
2013–14	Indiana Ice	USHL	59	28	28	56	21	12	2	4	6	0
2014–15	Providence College	HE	39	6	12	18	6	—	—	—	—	—
2015–16	Providence College	HE	38	9	16	25	16	—	—	—	—	—
2016–17	Providence College	HE	39	12	28	40	24	—	—	—	—	—
2017–18	Providence College	HE	40	12	20	32	26	—	—	—	—	—
2018–19	Hershey Bears	AHL	73	4	8	12	8	8	1	1	2	0
2019–20	Hershey Bears	AHL	62	20	17	37	16	—	—	—	—	—
2019–20	Washington Capitals	NHL	—	—	—	—	—	2	0	0	0	0
2020–21	Washington Capitals	NHL	2	0	0	0	0	—	—	—	—	—
2020–21	Hershey Bears	AHL	10	8	4	12	6	—	—	—	—	—
2021–22	Hershey Bears	AHL	27	8	9	17	6	—	—	—	—	—
2022–23	Utica Comets	AHL	53	10	18	28	14	6	2	1	3	0
2023–24	Bridgeport Islanders	AHL	72	9	25	34	6	—	—	—	—	—
2024–25	Bridgeport Islanders	AHL	65	25	24	49	10	—	—	—	—	—
2025–26	Charlotte Checkers	AHL	71	14	20	34	16	3	0	2	2	2
NHL totals			2	0	0	0	0	2	0	0	0	0

Awards and achievements
Preceded by Austin Cangelosi	Hockey East Best Defensive Forward; 2017–18	Succeeded by Chase Pearson
