= Josh Jacobs (ice hockey) =

American ice hockey player (born 1996)

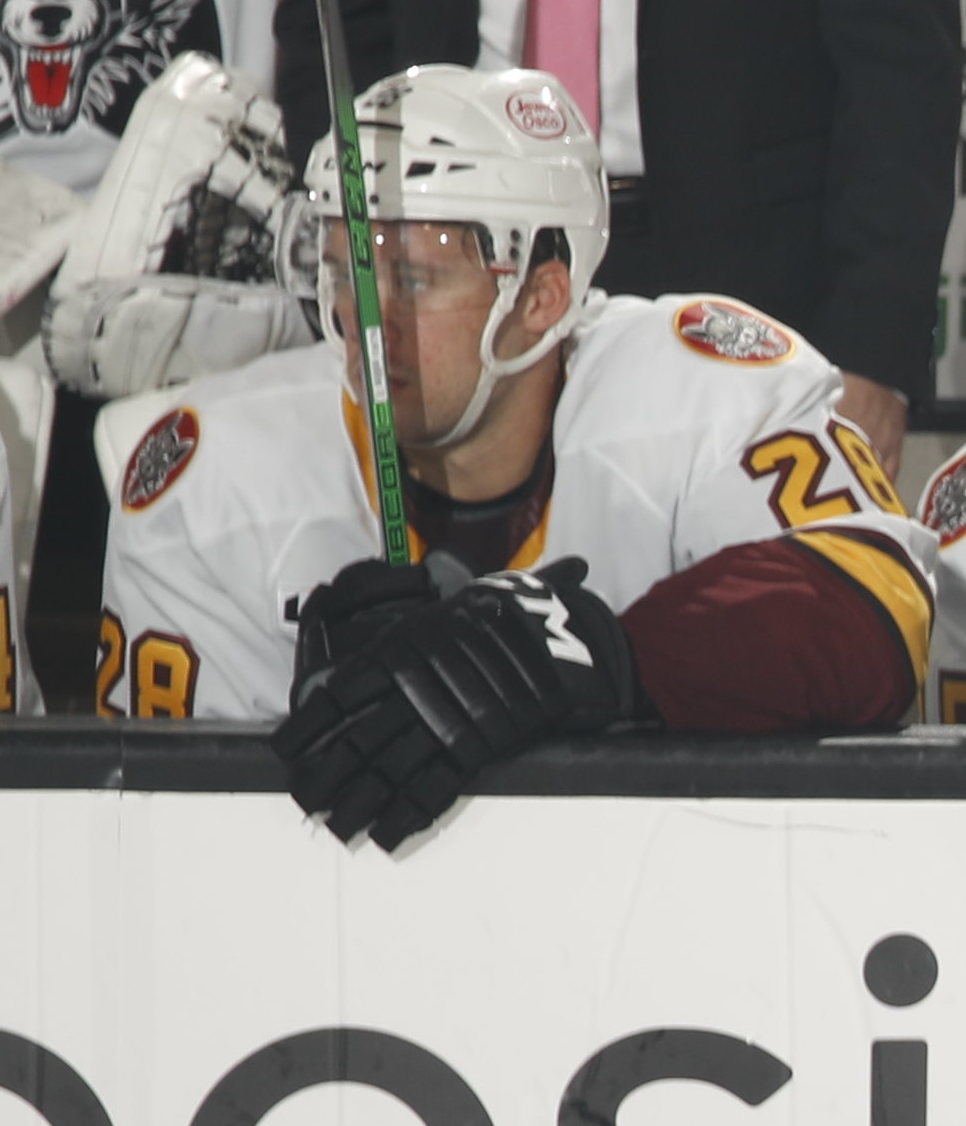
- Jacobs with the Chicago Wolves in 2021
- Born: February 15, 1996 (age 30) Shelby Township, Michigan, U.S.
- Height: 6 ft 2 in (188 cm)
- Weight: 223 lb (101 kg; 15 st 13 lb)
- Position: Defense
- Shoots: Right
- team Former teams: Free agent New Jersey Devils
- NHL draft: 41st overall, 2014; New Jersey Devils
- Playing career: 2016–present

Joshua Jacobs (born February 15, 1996) is an American professional ice hockey defenseman who is currently an unrestricted free agent. He most recently played for the Laval Rocket of the American Hockey League (AHL). He was selected in the second round, 41st overall, by the New Jersey Devils of the National Hockey League (NHL) in the 2014 NHL entry draft.

== Playing career ==
A Michigan native, Jacobs originally played for the Detroit Honeybaked U16 program of the Tier 1 Elite Hockey League (T1EHL) before being selected in the 2012 Ontario Hockey League (OHL) Priority selection draft, 72nd overall, by the Sarnia Sting.

Initially opting to continue his development in the United States Hockey League (USHL), he joined the Indiana Ice for the 2012–13 season and later committed to play collegiate hockey with Michigan State of the Big Ten Conference. In his second USHL season with Indiana, he contributed 23 points in 56 games to help the team claim the Clark Cup. Thereafter, Jacobs was drafted by the New Jersey Devils in the second round, 41st overall, of the 2014 NHL entry draft.

During his freshman season with the Spartans in 2014–15, Jacobs registered nine assists across 35 games, earning a selection to the Conference All-Rookie Team. Despite this, he would choose to conclude his collegiate tenure and instead continue development through the major junior ranks, signing with the Sting in June 2015.

In his solitary OHL season for 2015–16, Jacobs scored four goals and 24 total points in 67 games played. He likewise added five assists in the Sting’s seven-game opening series defeat over the Sault Ste. Marie Greyhounds. Upon the Sting's eventual elimination, he signed a three-year, entry-level contract with New Jersey on April 9, 2016. He immediately joined the Devils' American Hockey League (AHL) affiliate, the Albany Devils, on an amateur tryout (ATO) basis for the remainder of the season.

Entering the final year of his entry-level contract for the 2018–19 campaign, Jacobs received his first NHL recall by the injury-riddled Devils on March 21, 2019. That same day, he would make his NHL debut in a 5-1 defeat to the Boston Bruins at the Prudential Center in Newark, New Jersey before returning to the AHL ranks with Binghamton.

Following six seasons within the Devils organization, Jacobs was signed as a free agent to a one-year, two-way contract with the Carolina Hurricanes on August 4, 2021. After attending the Hurricanes' main training camp, he was assigned to AHL affiliate, the Chicago Wolves, for the duration of the 2021–22 season. Utilized in a regular defensive role, Jacobs recorded four goals and 15 points through 51 regular season games. In the ensuing postseason, Jacobs posted two points through 18 games to help the Wolves capture the Calder Cup.

Again finding himself a free agent in July 2022, he was signed to a one-year, two-way contract with the Colorado Avalanche for the 2022–23 season. Assigned to the AHL's Colorado Eagles for the duration of his contract with the Avalanche, Jacobs posted four goals and 10 points through 43 regular season games in the AHL. He then added a goal and four points in seven playoff appearances as the Eagles reached the Divisional semifinals.

On July 1, 2023, Jacobs agreed to a one-year, two-way contract to join Western Conference rival, the St. Louis Blues. However, he would ultimately not feature within the Blues organization, missing the entirety of the 2023–24 season through injury.

In July 2024, having left the Blues as a free agent, Jacobs signed a one-year AHL contract with the Montreal Canadiens' affiliate Laval Rocket. Six months later, he would suffer a knee-injury in a game versus the Abbotsford Canucks on January 4, 2025 which required surgery, effectively ending his season outright. Despite this setback, Jacobs agreed to a one-year extension to remain with the Rocket on July, 5, 2025.

== Career statistics ==
			Regular season					Playoffs
Season	Team	League	GP	G	A	Pts	PIM	GP	G	A	Pts	PIM
2012–13	Indiana Ice	USHL	48	2	13	15	52	—	—	—	—	—
2013–14	Indiana Ice	USHL	56	5	18	23	46	12	3	2	5	2
2014–15	Michigan State	B1G	35	0	9	9	26	—	—	—	—	—
2015–16	Sarnia Sting	OHL	67	4	20	24	38	7	0	5	5	6
2015–16	Albany Devils	AHL	1	0	0	0	0	—	—	—	—	—
2016–17	Albany Devils	AHL	49	0	9	9	32	4	0	0	0	0
2016–17	Adirondack Thunder	ECHL	1	0	0	0	0	—	—	—	—	—
2017–18	Binghamton Devils	AHL	55	1	15	16	33	—	—	—	—	—
2018–19	Binghamton Devils	AHL	69	3	10	13	42	—	—	—	—	—
2018–19	New Jersey Devils	NHL	1	0	0	0	0	—	—	—	—	—
2019–20	Binghamton Devils	AHL	54	5	10	15	20	—	—	—	—	—
2019–20	New Jersey Devils	NHL	2	0	0	0	2	—	—	—	—	—
2020–21	Binghamton Devils	AHL	19	0	3	3	8	—	—	—	—	—
2021–22	Chicago Wolves	AHL	51	4	11	15	24	18	1	1	2	12
2022–23	Colorado Eagles	AHL	43	4	6	10	18	7	1	3	4	0
2024–25	Laval Rocket	AHL	26	1	4	5	14	—	—	—	—	—
2025–26	Laval Rocket	AHL	19	1	4	5	6	—	—	—	—	—
NHL totals			3	0	0	0	2	—	—	—	—	—

== Awards and honors ==
Award	Year
USHL
USHL/NHL Top Prospects Game	2013
All-Star Game	2014
Clark Cup champion	2014
College
B1G All-Freshman Team	2015
AHL
Calder Cup champion	2022
