= Boo Nieves =

American ice hockey player

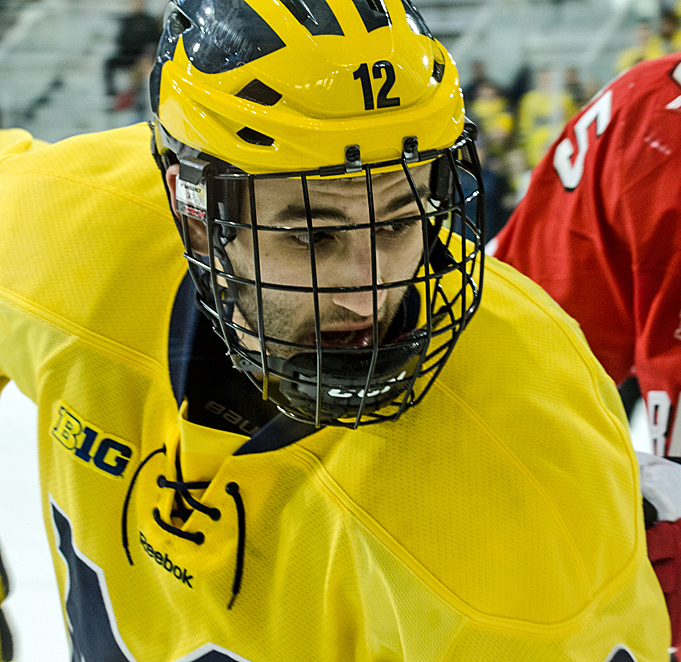
- Nieves with Michigan in 2015
- Born: January 23, 1994 (age 32) Baldwinsville, New York, U.S.
- Height: 6 ft 3 in (191 cm)
- Weight: 212 lb (96 kg; 15 st 2 lb)
- Position: Center
- Shot: Left
- Played for: New York Rangers
- NHL draft: 59th overall, 2012; New York Rangers
- Playing career: 2016–2020

Cristoval "Boo" Nieves (born January 23, 1994) is an American former professional ice hockey forward. He played his entire NHL career with the New York Rangers, who drafted him 59th overall in the 2012 NHL entry draft.

== Playing career ==
As a youth, Nieves played in the 2007 Quebec International Pee-Wee Hockey Tournament with a minor ice hockey team from Syracuse, New York. He played scholastic hockey with Kent School before a short junior hockey stint for the Indiana Ice in the United States Hockey League (USHL). He played collegiate hockey for the University of Michigan from 2012 to 2016. On March 28, 2016, Nieves signed a two-year, entry-level contract with the New York Rangers.

Nieves made his NHL debut on November 15, 2016, against the Vancouver Canucks. On October 26, 2017, in his second NHL game, Nieves scored his first point and in total had three assists in a 5–2 victory over the Arizona Coyotes.

On January 1, 2021, Nieves accepted a professional tryout invitation to attend the Tampa Bay Lightning training camp. Nearing the conclusion of camp, on January 12, 2021, Nieves was signed to a one-year, two-way contract with the Lightning. Nieves was assigned to Syracuse, but did not appear in a game during the season due to a head injury.

=== Career after hockey ===
After retiring from hockey due to injuries, Nieves established Topline Elite Hockey to train young hockey players at City Ice Pavilion in New York City.

== Personal life ==
Boo Nieves, was born January 23, 1994, to Rafael and Joanne Nieves. He identifies as a Afro-Latino, making him the only person of Puerto Rican descent to ever play in the National Hockey League.

== Career statistics ==
=== Regular season and playoffs ===
			Regular season					Playoffs
Season	Team	League	GP	G	A	Pts	PIM	GP	G	A	Pts	PIM
2010–11	Kent School	USHS	22	11	28	39	6	—	—	—	—	—
2011–12	Kent School	USHS	26	7	32	39	2	—	—	—	—	—
2011–12	Indiana Ice	USHL	13	2	8	10	2	—	—	—	—	—
2012–13	University of Michigan	CCHA	40	8	21	29	18	—	—	—	—	—
2013–14	University of Michigan	B1G	34	3	19	22	18	—	—	—	—	—
2014–15	University of Michigan	B1G	35	7	21	28	18	—	—	—	—	—
2015–16	University of Michigan	B1G	35	10	21	31	18	—	—	—	—	—
2015–16	Hartford Wolf Pack	AHL	8	2	3	5	0	—	—	—	—	—
2016–17	Hartford Wolf Pack	AHL	40	6	12	18	10	—	—	—	—	—
2016–17	New York Rangers	NHL	1	0	0	0	0	—	—	—	—	—
2017–18	Hartford Wolf Pack	AHL	40	8	13	21	12	—	—	—	—	—
2017–18	New York Rangers	NHL	28	1	8	9	12	—	—	—	—	—
2018–19	Hartford Wolf Pack	AHL	16	3	5	8	6	—	—	—	—	—
2018–19	New York Rangers	NHL	43	4	6	10	8	—	—	—	—	—
2019–20	Hartford Wolf Pack	AHL	43	5	22	27	16	—	—	—	—	—
2019–20	New York Rangers	NHL	4	0	0	0	4	—	—	—	—	—
NHL totals			76	5	14	19	24	—	—	—	—	—

=== International ===
Year	Team	Event	Result	GP	G	A	Pts	PIM
2011	United States	IH18	5th	4	1	3	4	0
Junior totals				4	1	3	4	0
