= Peter Krieger (ice hockey) =

American ice hockey player (born 1993)

- Born: December 9, 1993 (age 32) Oakdale, Minnesota, USA
- Height: 6 ft 0 in (183 cm)
- Weight: 194 lb (88 kg; 13 st 12 lb)
- Position: Center/Left Wing
- Shoots: Left
- ELH team Former teams: HC Vítkovice; Västerviks IK; Manitoba Moose; HKM Zvolen
- NHL draft: Undrafted
- Playing career: 2019–present

Peter Krieger (born December 9, 1993) is an American professional ice hockey forward currently playing for HC Vítkovice Ridera of the Czech Extraliga (ELH). He won two National Championships with Minnesota Duluth in 2018 and 2019.

== Playing career ==
Krieger attended Saint Thomas Academy, a Catholic military academy near his home town, and played on the ice hockey team for three years. After graduating in 2012, he continued his junior hockey career first with the Aberdeen Wings and then the Waterloo Black Hawks. After being a point per game scorer for nearly that entire five-year period, Krieger headed up to Alaska to begin his college career.

He debuted for the Nanooks in 2014, however, due to prior NCAA recruiting violations, Alaska was ineligible for the postseason that year. With Alaska eligible for the playoffs in his sophomore season, Krieger began to show the scoring touch he had possessed in juniors and led the club with 16 assists. Unfortunately, the Nanooks fell from 4th to 8th in the standings and were swept out in the first round.

After his second year, Krieger decided to transfer closer to home and join Minnesota Duluth. He sat out the next season per NCAA transfer requirements and then played his first game as a Bulldog in 2017. Krieger saw his goal totals explode with his new team, scoring nearly three times his totals as a sophomore. Krieger finished second on the team with 30 points, however, it was on the defensive end where Duluth made its name. UMD was one of the top teams in the country and, though they had a slightly disappointing regular season, they were still able to earn one of the final at-large bids for the NCAA tournament. Krieger helped his team earn four consecutive 1-goal victories to capture the National Championship. Krieger's scoring declined slightly in his final season but it didn't hurt the Bulldogs as UMD won a second consecutive NCAA championship.

With his college tenure now over, Krieger headed to Sweden to kick of his professional career. He joined Västerviks IK of the second Swedish league and finished in a tie for the team lead in goals. Västerviks made the postseason that year, however, the playoffs were abruptly ended on March 15 due to the Coronavirus pandemic.

Krieger returned to North America and played with the Indy Fuel during the abbreviated 'Covid year'. He performed well enough to earn a stint with the Manitoba Moose but ended up finishing the year in the ECHL.

After things returned to normal following the COVID-19 vaccine rollout, Krieger travelled back across the Atlantic. He spent the 21-22 season with HKM Zvolen and led the club in both goals and points (tied). After helping Zvolen to a second-place finish in the regular season, Krieger was again their top scorer in the playoffs but couldn't prevent them from bring eliminated in the semifinals. After the year, Krieger was again on the move and signed with HC Vítkovice Ridera of the ELH on May 4, 2023.

== Career statistics ==
			Regular season					Playoffs
Season	Team	League	GP	G	A	Pts	PIM	GP	G	A	Pts	PIM
2009–10	Saint Thomas Academy	USHS-MN	25	10	15	25	18	3	0	3	3	0
2010–11	Saint Thomas Academy	USHS-MN	25	7	20	27	14	3	1	4	5	2
2011–12	Saint Thomas Academy	USHS-MN	24	14	25	39	12	3	0	6	6	0
2012–13	Aberdeen Wings	NAHL	59	22	32	54	22	—	—	—	—	—
2013–14	Waterloo Black Hawks	USHL	60	26	41	67	18	12	2	9	11	14
2014–15	U. of Alaska-Fairbanks	WCHA	33	5	8	13	9	—	—	—	—	—
2015–16	U. of Alaska-Fairbanks	WCHA	36	4	16	20	8	—	—	—	—	—
2017–18	U. of Minnesota-Duluth	NCHC	44	11	19	30	44	—	—	—	—	—
2018–19	U. of Minnesota-Duluth	NCHC	41	9	15	24	41	—	—	—	—	—
2019–20	Västerviks IK	Allsv	52	12	10	22	48	1	0	1	1	0
2020–21	Indy Fuel	ECHL	22	7	10	17	10	3	1	1	2	2
2020–21	Manitoba Moose	AHL	14	1	6	7	8	—	—	—	—	—
2021–22	HKM Zvolen	Slovak	41	19	19	38	51	11	5	7	12	35
2022–23	HC Vítkovice	ELH	46	16	18	34	49	13	2	2	4	12
ELH totals			46	16	18	34	49	13	2	2	4	12
