= Mason Jobst =

American ice hockey player (born 1994)

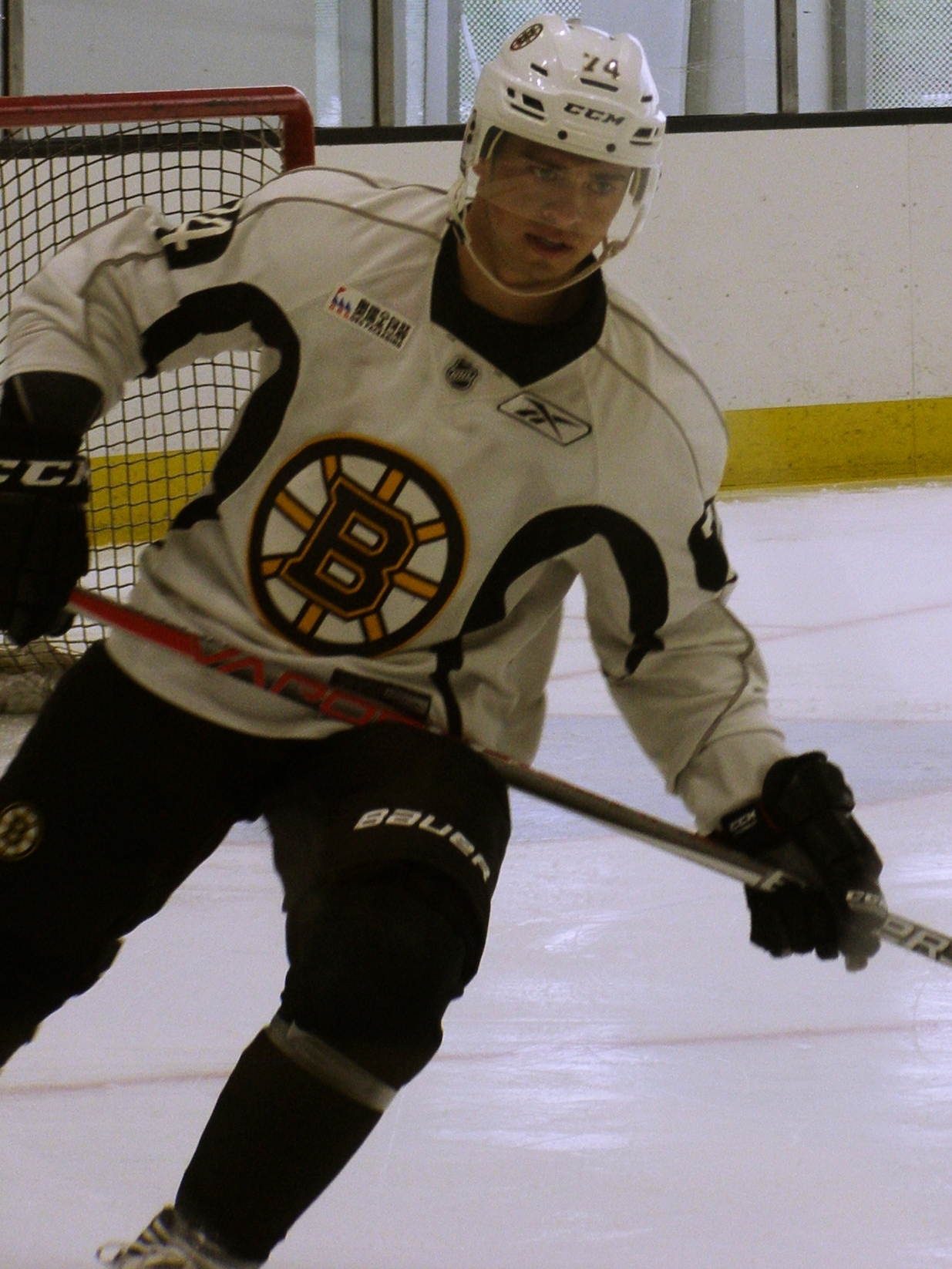
- Jobst with the Boston Bruins in 2017
- Born: February 17, 1994 (age 32) Speedway, Indiana, U.S.
- Height: 5 ft 8 in (173 cm)
- Weight: 185 lb (84 kg; 13 st 3 lb)
- Position: Left wing
- Shoots: Left
- team Former teams: Free Agent; Bridgeport Sound Tigers; Binghamton Devils; Rochester Americans; San Jose Barracuda
- NHL draft: Undrafted
- Playing career: 2019–present

Mason Kane Jobst (born February 17, 1994) is an American professional ice hockey left winger who is currently an unrestricted free agent. He most recently played for the Rochester Americans in the American Hockey League (AHL) while under contract to the Buffalo Sabres of the National Hockey League (NHL).

Growing up in Indiana, Jobst played high school ice hockey for the Zionsville High School. Once making the jump to the Muskegon Lumberjacks of the United States Hockey League (USHL), Jobst played four seasons with them, serving as team captain each of his last two years. During this time, he committed to play NCAA Division I ice hockey for the Ohio State Buckeyes men's ice hockey team.

As a collegiate ice hockey player, Jobst was named a finalist for the Hobey Baker Award and Big Ten Men's Ice Hockey Player of the Year. As a senior, he also earned First Team All-Big Ten accolades and was named a CCM/AHCA Second Team West All-American.

== Early life and education ==
Jobst was born on February 17, 1994, in Speedway, Indiana, U.S. to parents John and Amy. While both his parents were athletes growing up, he began playing ice hockey after receiving a hockey stick from his aunt. As a result, he learned how to skate at his grandfather's pond in Illinois and during trips to Pan Am Plaza before eventually enrolling in organized hockey leagues at the age of five. Growing up, Jobst was a fan of the Minnesota Golden Gophers. Jobst attended and graduated from Speedway Senior High School.

== Playing career ==
Jobst also took part in USA Hockey’s annual player development camp in Rochester, New York, where he led the camp in scoring during his second year there. He was eventually drafted by the Muskegon Lumberjacks of the United States Hockey League (USHL) in 2011 but was reassigned to his AAA team. He began the 2011–12 season with the Indiana Jr. Ice U-18 team before joining the Lumberjacks and skating in 32 games. The following year, Jobst suffered a shoulder injury in October which led to surgery in May 2013 and a delayed start to the 2013–14 USHL season. Jobst committed to play NCAA Division I ice hockey for the Ohio State Buckeyes men's ice hockey team in October 2014, choosing them over Penn State, Nebraska-Omaha, and Western Michigan. Shortly thereafter, he suffered another shoulder injury which sidelined him for most of the season. As a result, he enrolled at Muskegon Community College and eased into a physical rehabilitation program.

=== Collegiate ===
Jobst joined the Buckeyes for his freshman year during the 2015–16 season while majoring in real estate and urban analysis. By January, Jobst was the second-leading freshman scorer with six goals and 14 assists across the Big Ten. He was also named the Big Ten Third Star of the Week ending on January 19, 2016, after he led the league with seven points and continued his point streak to six games. As a result of his successful output, Jobst helped the Buckeyes advance to the semifinals of the Big Ten tournament. While the Buckeyes lost to Minnesota, Jobst was selected for the Big Ten All-Freshman Team.

Jobst returned to the Buckeyes for his sophomore season, where he led the league with 55 points in 39 games. Throughout the season, Jobst was named B1G First Star after recording three goals and four points at Penn State in January 2017. He ended the year ranking seventh in the NCAA in points and tied for second in assists. As a result, he earned Second Team All-America and First Team All-Big Ten accolades. He was also named an Academic All-Big Ten honoree and Ohio State Scholar-Athlete. Prior to the start of the 2017–18 season, Jobst was named team captain alongside his alternates Sasha Larocque and Luke Stork. He was also invited to participate in the development camps for the Pittsburgh Penguins and Boston Bruins.

As a senior at Ohio State, Jobst recorded a team-leading 17 goals in 35 games and ranked second with 19 assists. Among B1G games, he had 13 goals and 28 points which tied him fourth in points and first in goals among league skaters. In his second year as captain, Jobst scored the game-winning goal in double-overtime to lead Ohio State to the program's first Big Ten regular season hockey championship. Nearing the conclusion of his senior season, Jobst was named a finalist for the Hobey Baker Award, given annually to the top player in NCAA Division I men's hockey. He was also named a Big Ten Men's Ice Hockey Player of the Year finalist and earned First Team All-Big Ten accolades for the second time. He was also named a CCM/AHCA Second Team West All-American for the second time, becoming the first Buckeyes player to do so since 1999 and 1999. A few days later, Jobst also won the B1G Medal of Honor as someone who has "attained the greatest proficiency in athletics and scholastic work." He officially concluded his collegiate career on April 2, 2019, by signing a two-year entry-level contract with the New York Islanders.

=== Professional ===
Prior to the start of the 2020–21 season, Jobst was placed on waivers by the Islanders. Later that year, he was traded to the New Jersey Devils alongside A.J. Greer, the Islanders’ 2021 first-round pick, and a conditional fourth-rounder in 2022 in exchange for Kyle Palmieri and Travis Zajac. Upon joining the team, Greer and Jobst joined the Devils' AHL team, the Binghamton Devils. At the conclusion of the season, Jobst signed a one-year AHL contract with the Rochester Americans, the primary affiliate to the Buffalo Sabres.

In the following 2021–22 season, Jobst appeared in 26 regular season games with the Americans, posting 4 goals and 13 points. On March 28, 2022, Jobst was traded by Rochester to the San Jose Barracuda in exchange for Mark Alt.

As a free agent after his brief tenure with the Barracuda, Jobst returned to the Rochester Americans in the off-season by signing a one-year AHL contract on July 14, 2022.

On July 7, 2023, Jobst continued his tenure with the Americans in signing a one-year contract extension for the 2023–24 season. Responding with a career best offensive season, Jobst co-led the team in scoring with 22 goals and 50 points through 64 regular season games.

On July 1, 2024, Jobst secured an NHL contract, signing a one-year, two-way contract to remain with the Sabres. On July 1, 2025, Jobst's contract with expired. He was not tendered a new deal by the Sabres organization and consequently left as an unrestricted free agent.

== Career statistics ==
			Regular season					Playoffs
Season	Team	League	GP	G	A	Pts	PIM	GP	G	A	Pts	PIM
2010–11	U.S. National Development Team	USHL	2	1	1	2	0	—	—	—	—	—
2011–12	Muskegon Lumberjacks	USHL	32	2	8	10	18	—	—	—	—	—
2012–13	Muskegon Lumberjacks	USHL	64	6	18	24	26	3	0	0	0	0
2013–14	Muskegon Lumberjacks	USHL	49	10	35	45	46	—	—	—	—	—
2014–15	Muskegon Lumberjacks	USHL	11	2	5	7	2	3	1	2	3	2
2015–16	Ohio State University	B1G	35	12	18	30	16	—	—	—	—	—
2016–17	Ohio State University	B1G	39	19	36	55	18	—	—	—	—	—
2017–18	Ohio State University	B1G	40	21	22	43	24	—	—	—	—	—
2018–19	Ohio State University	B1G	36	17	19	36	20	—	—	—	—	—
2019–20	Bridgeport Sound Tigers	AHL	44	5	8	13	25	—	—	—	—	—
2020–21	Bridgeport Sound Tigers	AHL	7	0	2	2	2	—	—	—	—	—
2020–21	Binghamton Devils	AHL	12	5	3	8	6	—	—	—	—	—
2021–22	Rochester Americans	AHL	26	4	9	13	16	—	—	—	—	—
2021–22	San Jose Barracuda	AHL	11	1	1	2	10	—	—	—	—	—
2022–23	Rochester Americans	AHL	61	14	24	38	23	14	3	10	13	10
2023–24	Rochester Americans	AHL	64	22	28	50	49	5	1	2	3	6
2024–25	Rochester Americans	AHL	70	18	19	37	49	8	2	0	2	10
AHL totals			295	69	94	163	180	27	6	12	18	26

== Awards and honors ==
Award	Year
College
B1G All-Rookie Team	2016
B1G First All-Star Team	2017, 2019
West Second All-American Team	2017, 2019
B1G All-Tournament Team	2018
B1G Second All-Star Team	2018
Hobey Baker Finalist	2019

Awards and achievements
Preceded by Kyle Connor	Big Ten Scoring Champion; 2016–17; With: Tyler Sheehy	Succeeded by Cooper Marody
