= Cooper Marody =

American ice hockey player and musician (born 1996)

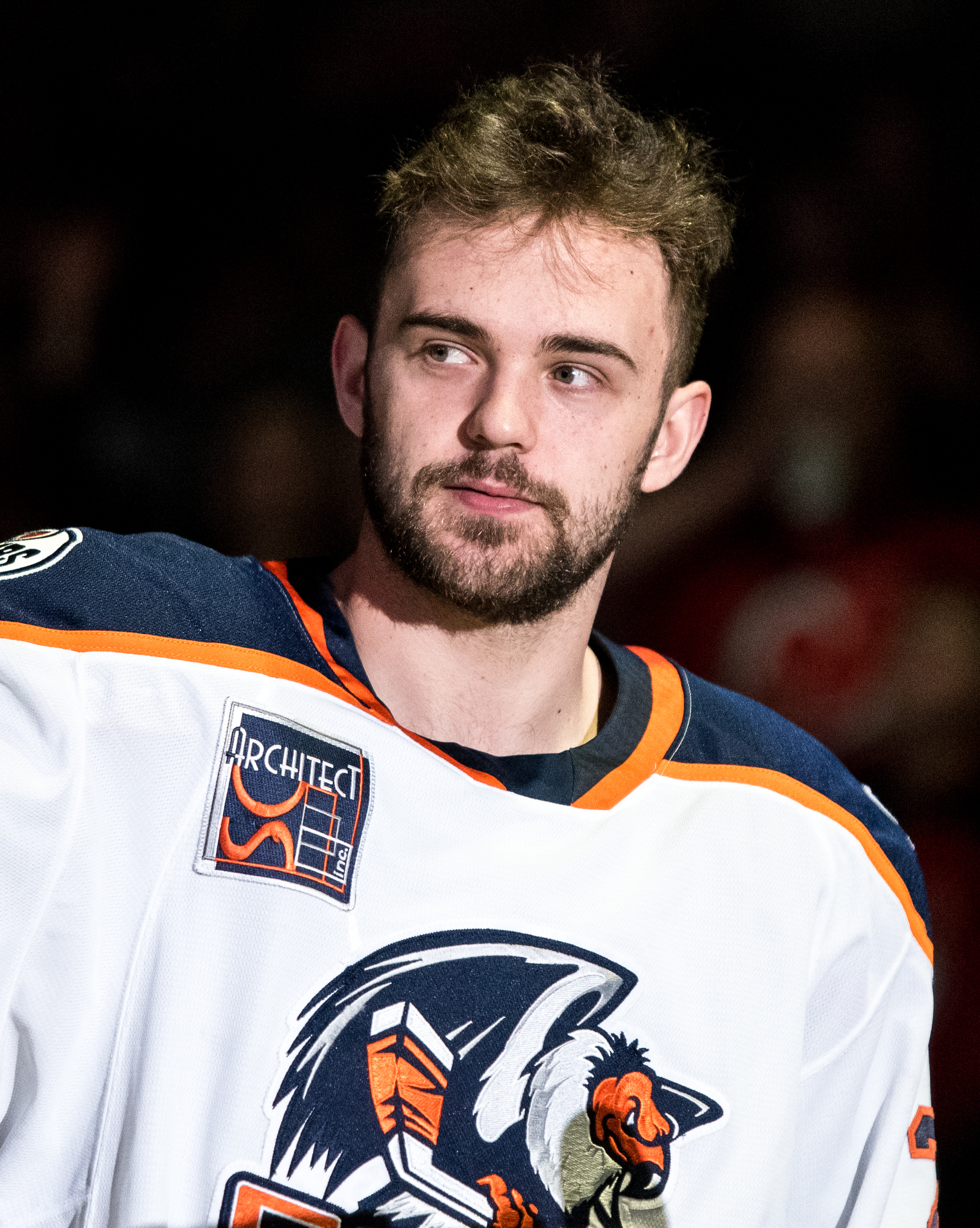
- Marody with the Bakersfield Condors in 2019
- Born: December 20, 1996 (age 29) Brighton, Michigan, U.S.
- Height: 6 ft 0 in (183 cm)
- Weight: 184 lb (83 kg; 13 st 2 lb)
- Position: Center
- Shoots: Right
- SHL team Former teams: Linköping HC; Edmonton Oilers
- NHL draft: 158th overall, 2015; Philadelphia Flyers
- Playing career: 2018–present

Cooper Patrick Marody (born December 20, 1996) is an American musician and professional ice hockey player who is currently playing with Linköping HC in the Swedish Hockey League (SHL). Marody was drafted 158th overall by the Philadelphia Flyers in the 2015 NHL entry draft.

== Early and personal life ==
Marody was born on December 20, 1996, to Patrick and Lisa Marody. He attended St. Patrick School in Brighton before attending St. Mary's Prep in Orchard Lake Village for two years. During his freshman year, he played for the junior varsity team, before being promoted to the varsity team later in the season. During his sophomore year, he was named to the 2012–13 MHSHCA First Team All-State.

== Playing career ==
=== Junior ===
Marody was drafted 130th overall by the Green Bay Gamblers in the 2013 United States Hockey League (USHL) draft, however, he was never signed by the team. He attended an open tryout camp for the Muskegon Lumberjacks, and signed with the team as a free agent. During the 2013–14 season, Marody recorded nine goals and 21 assists in 58 games for the Lumberjacks. During the 2014–15 season, Marody began the season with the Lumberjacks, where he recorded two goals and seven assists in 14 games. On December 4, 2014, he was traded to the Sioux Falls Stampede in exchange for Will Graber. In 38 regular season games for the Stampede, he recorded 20 goals and 29 assists. During the 2015 Clark Cup playoffs he recorded one goal and 11 assists in 12 games, to help lead the Stampede to the Clark Cup.

=== College ===
Marody began his collegiate for the Michigan Wolverines during the 2015–16 season. He recorded his first career goal and assist in his debut on October 16, 2015, against Mercyhurst. In his freshman season he recorded 10 goals and 14 assists in 32 games. He missed over a month of action after suffering from mononucleosis. During the 2016–17 season, Marody recorded five goals and ten assists in 18 games. He was ruled academically ineligible for the first semester, and returned in time for the 2016 Great Lakes Invitational (GLI). He recorded his first career hat-trick and multi-goal game on February 3, 2017, against Ohio State. Following his outstanding performance, he was named the Big Ten Third Star of the Week for the week ending February 7, 2017, earning his first weekly award.

During the 2017–18 season, Marody was the Big Ten Scoring Champion, recording 16 goals and 35 assists in 40 games. His 51 points led the Big Ten and ranked sixth in the NCAA, while his 35 assists ranked first in the Big Ten and third in the NCAA. He became the third Wolverine to earn the Big Ten scoring title, following Zach Hyman (2015) and Kyle Connor (2016). From October 27 to November 18, he posted an eight-game multi-point streak, registering four goals and 15 assists during that span. He became the first Wolverines player to record multiple points in eight consecutive games since Brian Wiseman during the 1993–94 season. He was named the Big Ten First Star of the Week for the week ending January 3, 2018. He recorded four points, including his second career hat-trick to help Michigan claim third place in the 2018 GLI, and was named to the all-tournament team. He was nominated for the Hobey Baker Award, however he did not finish as a top 10 finalist. Following an outstanding season with the Wolverines, he was named to the All-Big Ten First Team, and was named an AHCA Second Team All-American.

During the 2018 Big Ten men's ice hockey tournament, Marody recorded three assists in the quarterfinals against Wisconsin. During the semifinals against Ohio State, he recorded both of Michigan's goals, however, the Wolverines lost the game in overtime. During the 2018 NCAA Division I men's ice hockey tournament, Marody scored two goals, including the game-winning goal in the regional semifinals against Northeastern. During the Regional finals against Boston University, Marody scored one goal to help Michigan advance to the Frozen Four for the first time since 2011.

=== Professional ===
On March 21, 2018, the Philadelphia Flyers traded the rights to Marody to the Edmonton Oilers in exchange for a third-round pick in the 2019 NHL entry draft. On April 8, 2018, Marody signed a three-year, entry-level contract with the Oilers. He was assigned to the Bakersfield Condors, the Oilers' AHL affiliate the next day. On April 11, he made his professional debut in a game against the San Jose Barracuda, where he recorded his first point, with the primary assist on the Condors only goal of the game by Tyler Vesel. On April 12 he recorded his first professional goal against Stephon Williams of the Barracuda. He finished the 2017–18 season with one goal and two assists in three games for the Condors.

Marody was called up to the NHL for the first time on October 21, 2018, as a result of several injuries to the Edmonton Oilers roster. He made his NHL debut on October 23, playing 9:58 minutes of ice time in an overtime loss to the Pittsburgh Penguins. Marody was reassigned to the Condors and later named to the 2019 AHL All-Star Game after leading the team in scoring.

As a free agent from the Oilers, Marody returned to his draft club, after signing a two-year, two-way contract with the Philadelphia Flyers on July 13, 2022.

At the conclusion of his NHL contract with the Flyers, Marody opted to continue with affiliate, the Lehigh Valley Phantoms, in securing a two-year AHL contract extension on July 30, 2024.

On 8 July 2026, Marody opted to sign his first contract abroad, agreeing to a one-year deal with Swedish club, Linköping HC of the SHL.

== Music career ==
In June 2020, Marody wrote and recorded the song "Agape", for the wife of former teammate Colby Cave. Marody also recorded the song “I Don’t Deserve Her Yet” in August 2019.

== Career statistics ==
			Regular season					Playoffs
Season	Team	League	GP	G	A	Pts	PIM	GP	G	A	Pts	PIM
2011–12	St. Mary's Preparatory	HSMI	7	1	3	4	2	—	—	—	—	—
2012–13	St. Mary's Preparatory	HSMI	26	19	23	42	20	—	—	—	—	—
2013–14	Muskegon Lumberjacks	USHL	58	9	21	30	36	—	—	—	—	—
2014–15	Muskegon Lumberjacks	USHL	14	2	7	9	4	—	—	—	—	—
2014–15	Sioux Falls Stampede	USHL	38	20	29	49	28	—	—	—	—	—
2015–16	University of Michigan	B1G	32	10	14	24	20	—	—	—	—	—
2016–17	University of Michigan	B1G	18	5	10	15	8	—	—	—	—	—
2017–18	University of Michigan	B1G	40	16	35	51	24	—	—	—	—	—
2017–18	Bakersfield Condors	AHL	3	1	2	3	2	—	—	—	—	—
2018–19	Bakersfield Condors	AHL	58	19	45	64	40	4	0	0	0	2
2018–19	Edmonton Oilers	NHL	6	0	0	0	0	—	—	—	—	—
2019–20	Bakersfield Condors	AHL	30	5	12	17	22	—	—	—	—	—
2020–21	Dornbirn Bulldogs	ICEHL	1	0	0	0	0	—	—	—	—	—
2020–21	Bakersfield Condors	AHL	39	21	15	36	18	6	1	2	3	0
2021–22	Bakersfield Condors	AHL	52	21	34	55	52	5	1	1	2	2
2021–22	Edmonton Oilers	NHL	1	0	1	1	0	—	—	—	—	—
2022–23	Lehigh Valley Phantoms	AHL	47	15	25	40	26	3	1	2	3	2
2023–24	Lehigh Valley Phantoms	AHL	68	19	37	56	42	6	0	5	5	2
2024–25	Lehigh Valley Phantoms	AHL	6	1	0	1	2	—	—	—	—	—
2025–26	Lehigh Valley Phantoms	AHL	41	8	17	25	10	—	—	—	—	—
2025–26	Coachella Valley Firebirds	AHL	15	5	6	11	10	4	0	0	0	6
NHL totals			7	0	1	1	0	—	—	—	—	—

== Awards and honors ==
Honors	Year
College
All-Big Ten First Team	2018
Big Ten Scoring Champion	2018
AHCA West Second-Team All-American	2018
American Hockey League
All-Star Game	2019
Pacific Division All-Star Team	2021
Willie Marshall Award	2021

Awards and achievements
Preceded by Mason Jobst / Tyler Sheehy	Big Ten Scoring Champion; 2017–18	Succeeded by Taro Hirose
