= Patrick Russell (ice hockey) =

Danish ice hockey player (born 1993)

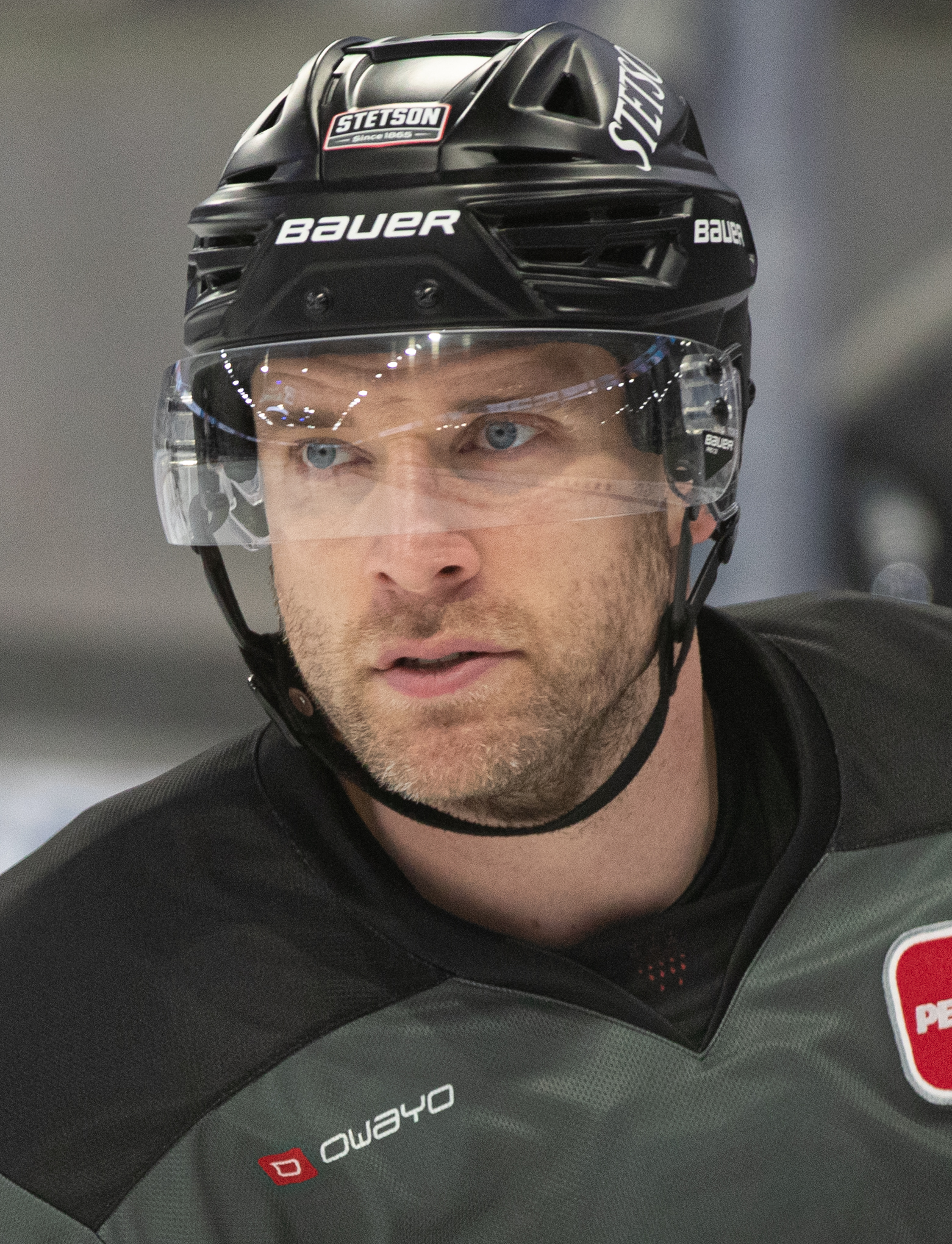
- Russell with the Kölner Haie in 2025
- Born: 4 January 1993 (age 33) Birkerød, Denmark
- Height: 6 ft 1 in (185 cm)
- Weight: 203 lb (92 kg; 14 st 7 lb)
- Position: Forward
- Shoots: Right
- DEL team Former teams: Kölner Haie; Edmonton Oilers; Rungsted Seier Capital; Linköping HC
- National team: Denmark
- NHL draft: Undrafted
- Playing career: 2016–present

Patrick Russell (born 4 January 1993) is a Danish professional ice hockey player who is a forward for Kölner Haie of the Deutsche Eishockey Liga (DEL). He has previously played with the Edmonton Oilers of the National Hockey League (NHL).

== Playing career ==
Russell played for the youth teams of the Gentofte Stars in his native Denmark and saw the ice in Denmark's second-tier league before moving to Sweden in 2009. He joined the youth ranks of Linköping HC, where he developed his game until 2013. Russell then headed over the pond and spent the 2013–14 season with the Waterloo Black Hawks of the United States Hockey League (USHL). Making 67 appearances for the Black Hawks, he collected 34 goals and 23 assists, helping the Waterloo side win the Anderson Cup and reaching the Clark Cup Championship series.

From 2014 to 2016, Russell attended St. Cloud State University. He made the 2015 All-NCHC Rookie Team and in his sophomore year, helped the Huskies capture the National Collegiate Hockey Conference (NCHC) title, tallying 20 goals and 21 assists in 41 contests on the season.

On 9 May 2016, Russell signed a two-year, entry-level deal with the Edmonton Oilers of the National Hockey League (NHL). Russell's NHL debut came on 17 November 2018, for the Oilers against the Calgary Flames. Russell's total ice time was 8 minutes and 37 seconds, and he recorded two hits. He became the 12th Danish player to play in the NHL.

Following his fifth season within the Oilers organization in 2020–21, Russell left as a free agent. Leaving North America, Russell signed a two-year contract with former Swedish junior club Linköping HC of the Swedish Hockey League (SHL) on 1 August 2021.

On 30 May 2025, Russell left the SHL after four seasons and was signed as a free agent to a one-year contract with German club, Kölner Haie of the DEL.

== International play ==
Russell represented Denmark's junior national teams at the under-18 and under-20 level, where he served as a team captain. In 2017, he played his first World Championship with the men's national team.

== Career statistics ==
=== Regular season and playoffs ===
			Regular season					Playoffs
Season	Team	League	GP	G	A	Pts	PIM	GP	G	A	Pts	PIM
2007–08	Gentofte Stars	DEN U17	12	16	17	33	8	—	—	—	—	—
2007–08	Gentofte Stars	DEN U20	1	0	0	0	0	2	0	0	0	2
2008–09	Gentofte Stars	DEN U17	8	15	10	25	10	—	—	—	—	—
2008–09	Gentofte Stars	DEN U20	27	31	15	48	28	3	1	2	3	0
2008–09	Gentofte Stars	DEN.2	13	5	2	7	4	6	0	1	1	2
2009–10	Linköpings HC	J18	22	15	9	24	10	—	—	—	—	—
2009–10	Linköpings HC	J18 Allsv	8	1	2	3	0	3	0	0	0	2
2010–11	Linköpings HC	J18	15	13	11	24	8	—	—	—	—	—
2010–11	Linköpings HC	J18 Allsv	18	6	8	14	8	3	1	0	1	0
2010–11	Linköpings HC	J20	4	0	0	0	2	—	—	—	—	—
2011–12	Linköpings HC	J20	1	0	0	0	0	1	0	0	0	0
2012–13	Linköpings HC	J20	37	18	18	36	6	5	0	3	3	4
2013–14	Waterloo Black Hawks	USHL	55	29	20	49	40	12	5	3	8	6
2014–15	St. Cloud State University	NCHC	40	10	15	25	12	—	—	—	—	—
2015–16	St. Cloud State University	NCHC	41	20	21	41	14	—	—	—	—	—
2016–17	Bakersfield Condors	AHL	68	8	9	17	22	—	—	—	—	—
2017–18	Bakersfield Condors	AHL	68	14	13	27	48	—	—	—	—	—
2018–19	Bakersfield Condors	AHL	51	18	22	40	32	10	2	5	7	4
2018–19	Edmonton Oilers	NHL	6	0	0	0	2	—	—	—	—	—
2019–20	Edmonton Oilers	NHL	45	0	5	5	12	—	—	—	—	—
2020–21	Rungsted Seier Capital	DEN	3	0	0	0	0	—	—	—	—	—
2020–21	Edmonton Oilers	NHL	8	0	2	2	0	—	—	—	—	—
2021–22	Linköping HC	SHL	42	18	10	28	14	—	—	—	—	—
2022–23	Linköping HC	SHL	52	10	16	26	24	—	—	—	—	—
2023–24	Linköping HC	SHL	49	21	12	33	45	4	0	1	1	0
2024–25	Linköping HC	SHL	51	12	17	29	18	—	—	—	—	—
2025–26	Kölner Haie	DEL	52	27	33	60	27	9	4	2	6	2
NHL totals			59	0	7	7	14	—	—	—	—	—
SHL totals			194	61	55	116	101	4	0	1	1	0

=== International ===
Year	Team	Event	Result	GP	G	A	Pts	PIM
2010	Denmark	U18 D1	13th	5	2	7	9	0
2011	Denmark	WJC D1	12th	5	7	1	8	2
2011	Denmark	U18 D1	11th	5	5	9	14	0
2013	Denmark	WJC D1A	15th	5	1	1	2	18
2017	Denmark	WC	12th	7	1	0	1	0
2018	Denmark	WC	10th	7	0	0	0	0
2019	Denmark	WC	11th	4	0	1	1	0
2021	Denmark	OGQ	Q	3	2	1	3	4
2022	Denmark	OG	7th	5	0	3	3	0
2023	Denmark	WC	10th	7	2	1	3	2
2024	Denmark	WC	13th	7	1	3	4	0
2024	Denmark	OGQ	Q	3	2	0	2	4
2025	Denmark	WC	4th	10	2	5	7	6
2026	Denmark	OG	9th	4	0	0	0	2
2026	Denmark	WC	12th	7	3	2	5	0
Junior totals				20	15	18	33	20
Senior totals				64	13	16	29	18
