= Brandon Montour =

Canadian ice hockey player (born 1994)

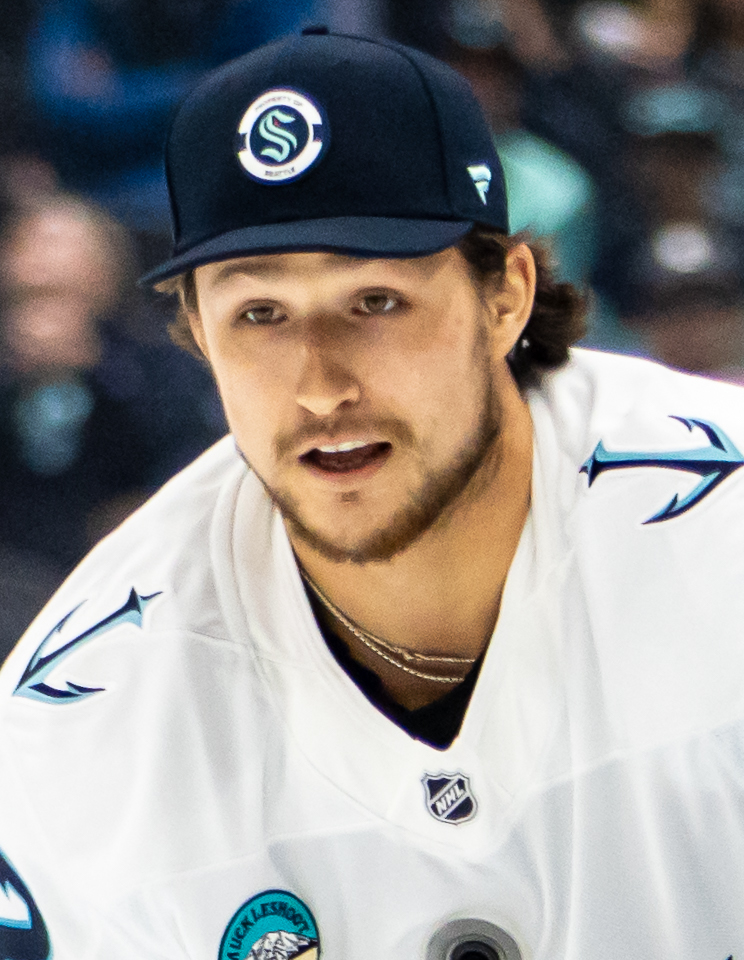
- Montour with the Seattle Kraken in 2024
- Born: April 11, 1994 (age 32) Ohsweken, Ontario, Canada
- Height: 6 ft 0 in (183 cm)
- Weight: 194 lb (88 kg; 13 st 12 lb)
- Position: Defence
- Shoots: Right
- NHL team Former teams: Seattle Kraken; Anaheim Ducks; Buffalo Sabres; Florida Panthers
- National team: Canada
- NHL draft: 55th overall, 2014; Anaheim Ducks
- Playing career: 2015–present

Brandon Montour (born April 11, 1994) is a Canadian professional ice hockey player who is a defenceman and alternate captain for the Seattle Kraken of the National Hockey League (NHL). Montour was selected by the Anaheim Ducks in the second round, 55th overall, of the 2014 NHL entry draft. Montour won the Stanley Cup with the Panthers in 2024.

== Early life ==
Montour is of Mohawk descent and spent part of his childhood in Ohsweken, a village in the reserve of Six Nations of the Grand River. His father is First Nations and his mother is not. Montour spent eight years living in Tilbury, Ontario, where he completed his elementary education. He then moved to Ohsweken and attended Assumption College School, in Brantford, Ontario. Montour also grew up playing minor box lacrosse in Windsor, then with the Six Nations Rebels of the Ontario Junior B Lacrosse League (OJBLL), before winning a Minto Cup with the Six Nations Arrows. Montour also played in lacrosse tournaments with Nick Ritchie, a future teammate on the Ducks, as well as Ritchie's brother, Brett Ritchie, who also played in the NHL.

== Playing career ==
Montour started his ice hockey journey playing minor ice hockey in Cambridge, Ontario, prior to joining the Brantford Eagles in 2010–11. Montour then joined the Caledonia Corvairs for one season in 2012–13.

Montour played with the Waterloo Black Hawks of the United States Hockey League (USHL) and one season with the University of Massachusetts Amherst, where he became the highest NHL draft pick in their school program's history after being drafted in the second round of the 2014 NHL entry draft by the Anaheim Ducks.

=== Anaheim Ducks ===
Montour began his professional career at age 21 with the Anaheim Ducks' affiliate, the Norfolk Admirals of the American Hockey League (AHL), towards the end of the 2014–15 season. He would then play the entire 2015–16 season with the Ducks' relocated AHL affiliate, the San Diego Gulls. Montour was selected to the 2017 AHL All-Star game for the second consecutive year. Despite not playing the entire season for the Gulls, Montour had amassed 21 points in only 25 games.

Montour spent the first half of the 2016–17 season with San Diego before he was called up to Anaheim on December 28, 2016. He made his NHL debut on December 29, against the Calgary Flames. Montour scored his first NHL goal in his sixth game against Tampa Bay Lightning on February 6, 2017. He finished the season with four assists and two goals in 27 games, then provided seven more assists in the next 17 games of the 2017 Stanley Cup playoffs.

Montour stuck with Ducks for the entirety of the 2017–18 season and put up a new personal best of 32 points in 80 games. At the conclusion of the season, with Montour as a restricted free agent, the Ducks signed him to a two-year contract.

=== Buffalo Sabres ===
Montour began the 2018–19 season returning for his third season with the Ducks. He led Anaheim defencemen with 25 points through 62 games, however with the Ducks out of a playoff spot approaching the trade deadline, Montour was dealt to the Buffalo Sabres in exchange for Brendan Guhle and a 2019 first-round pick on February 24, 2019.

=== Florida Panthers ===
On April 10, 2021, Montour was traded to the Florida Panthers in exchange for a 2021 third-round pick.

After signing a three-year extension with Florida, Montour experienced a breakout in the 2022–23 season, nearly doubling his personal best with 16 goals and 73 points, the latter of which tied for fifth in the league among defencemen. His five goals in seven games led all defencemen through the first round of the 2023 playoffs. During the 2024 playoffs, Montour helped the Panthers win their first Stanley Cup.

=== Seattle Kraken ===
On July 1, 2024, Montour signed as a free agent to a seven-year, $49.98 million deal with the Seattle Kraken. On October 29, he recorded the first hat trick of his career, which was also a natural hat trick, in an 8–2 Kraken win over the Montreal Canadiens. On March 12, 2025, Montour recorded the fastest overtime goal in NHL history, scoring 4 seconds after the initial face-off against the Montreal Canadiens.

== International play ==
Medal record

Ice hockey

Representing Canada

World Championships
Silver medal – second place	2019 Slovakia	

On April 29, 2019, Montour was selected to make his international debut after he was named to Canada senior team for the 2019 IIHF World Championship. On May 13, during a 6–5 victory over host nation Slovakia, Montour suffered a tournament-ending lower body injury, he finished scoreless through three games for Canada. Canada lost the final to Finland to finish with the silver medal.

== Career statistics ==
=== Regular season and playoffs ===
			Regular season					Playoffs
Season	Team	League	GP	G	A	Pts	PIM	GP	G	A	Pts	PIM
2010–11	Brantford Eagles	GOJHL	37	1	13	14	22	10	0	3	3	6
2011–12	Brantford Eagles	GOJHL	51	14	22	36	65	19	6	12	18	30
2012–13	Caledonia Corvairs	GOJHL	49	18	49	67	94	12	4	11	15	22
2013–14	Waterloo Black Hawks	USHL	60	14	48	62	36	12	6	10	16	10
2014–15	Waterloo Black Hawks	USHL	17	6	15	21	30	—	—	—	—	—
2014–15	UMass-Amherst	HE	21	3	17	20	30	—	—	—	—	—
2014–15	Norfolk Admirals	AHL	14	1	9	10	8	—	—	—	—	—
2015–16	San Diego Gulls	AHL	68	12	45	57	42	9	1	4	5	8
2016–17	San Diego Gulls	AHL	36	13	19	32	34	—	—	—	—	—
2016–17	Anaheim Ducks	NHL	27	2	4	6	14	17	0	7	7	4
2017–18	Anaheim Ducks	NHL	80	9	23	32	42	4	0	1	1	6
2018–19	Anaheim Ducks	NHL	62	5	20	25	40	—	—	—	—	—
2018–19	Buffalo Sabres	NHL	20	3	7	10	16	—	—	—	—	—
2019–20	Buffalo Sabres	NHL	54	5	13	18	28	—	—	—	—	—
2020–21	Buffalo Sabres	NHL	38	5	9	14	24	—	—	—	—	—
2020–21	Florida Panthers	NHL	12	2	2	4	16	6	0	0	0	6
2021–22	Florida Panthers	NHL	81	11	26	37	48	10	0	3	3	6
2022–23	Florida Panthers	NHL	80	16	57	73	107	21	8	5	13	39
2023–24	Florida Panthers	NHL	66	8	25	33	46	24	3	8	11	12
2024–25	Seattle Kraken	NHL	81	18	23	41	70	—	—	—	—	—
2025–26	Seattle Kraken	NHL	64	11	21	32	45	—	—	—	—	—
NHL totals			665	95	230	325	496	82	11	24	35	73

=== International ===
Year	Team	Event	Result	GP	G	A	Pts	PIM
2019	Canada	WC	2nd place, silver medalist(s)	3	0	0	0	0
2025	Canada	WC	5th	8	2	7	9	0
Senior totals				11	2	7	9	0

== Awards and honours ==
Award	Year	Ref
GOJHL
Midwestern best Defenceman	2013	
USHL
All-Star Game	2014	
Defenceman of the Year	2014	
First All-Star Team	2014	
Player of the Year	2014	
College
HE All-Rookie Team	2015	
AHL
All-Star Game	2016, 2017	
First All-Star Team	2016	
All-Rookie Team	2016	
NHL
Stanley Cup champion	2024	
