= Tyler Sheehy =

American ice hockey player (born 1995)

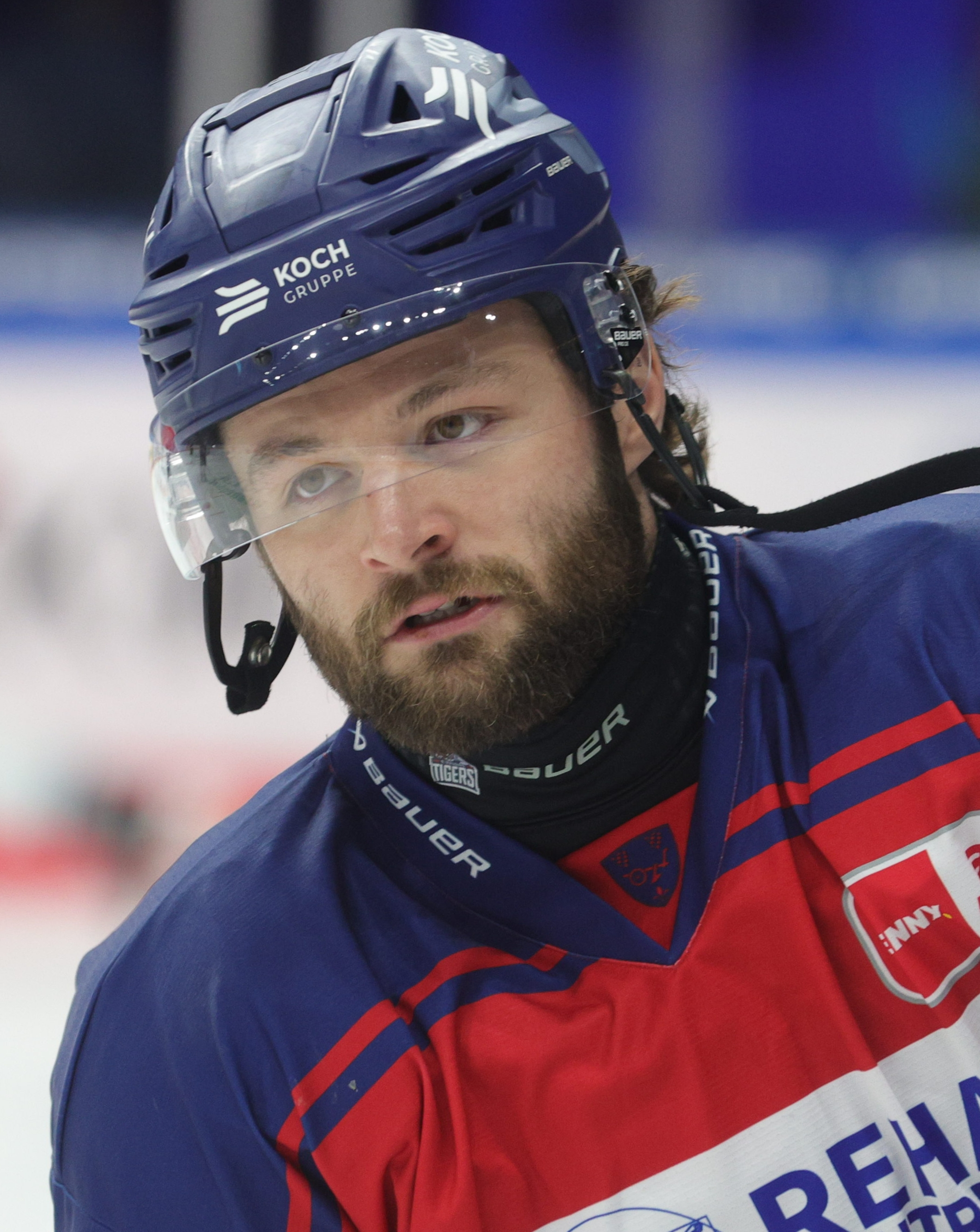
- Sheehy in 2024
- Born: November 20, 1995 (age 29); Burnsville, Minnesota, U.S.
- Height: 5 ft 9 in (175 cm)
- Weight: 179 lb (81 kg; 12 st 11 lb)
- Position: Center
- Shoots: Right
- Slovak team Former teams: HKM Zvolen; Iowa Wild; Nürnberg Ice Tigers; Straubing Tigers
- NHL draft: Undrafted
- Playing career: 2015–present

Tyler Sheehy (born November 20, 1995) is an American professional ice hockey center for HKM Zvolen in the Slovak Extraliga. He was an All-American for Minnesota.

== Playing career ==
Sheehy joined the Golden Gophers ice hockey team in the fall of 2015 and immediately became a key contributor on offense. After helping Minnesota capture its 4th-consecutive first-place finish, Sheehy became one of the team's stars as a sophomore. Sheehy led the Gophers in scoring and was named an All-American. Unfortunately, Minnesota lost both of its postseason games that season and ended the season on a sour note. Entering his junior season, Sheehy was named team captain and, with the team ranked 3rd in the pre-season poll, there were high expectations. As it turned out, however, Minnesota's offense played poorly all season while Sheehy's offensive numbers were more than halved. The fallout from losing both playoff matches once more was the resignation of head coach Don Lucia after 19 seasons. Sheehy's production recovered in his senior season under new bench boss Bob Motzko but Minnesota fared little better in their record and Sheehy's college career ended with just a single NCAA tournament game to his résumé.

After graduating, Sheehy signed with the Minnesota Wild and was assigned to their AHL affiliate for the remainder of the season. He spent most of his first full year as a professional playing with the Allen Americans but made the most of his time there, leading the team in scoring. Unfortunately, due to the COVID-19 pandemic, he wasn't able to showcase his talent in any postseason games. He was resigned to a 1-year contract when the following season finally began and split time between the Americans and the Iowa Wild. He didn't have as good of a season the second time around but did finally return to postseason action.

In 2021, Sheehy travelled to Germany to continue his professional career and signed a deal with the Nürnberg Ice Tigers of the top flight DEL.

In his second season with the Ice Tigers in 2022–23, Sheehy contributed offensively with 12 goals and 34 points through 53 regular season games. Following a playoff qualifier defeat to the Fischtown Pinguins, he left Nürnberg at the conclusion of his contract on March 18, 2023.

== Career statistics ==
			Regular season					Playoffs
Season	Team	League	GP	G	A	Pts	PIM	GP	G	A	Pts	PIM
2011–12	Burnsville High School	MN-HS	25	19	25	44	4	3	2	3	5	2
2011–12	Waterloo Black Hawks	USHL	7	0	1	1	0	—	—	—	—	—
2012–13	Burnsville High School	MN-HS	25	17	27	44	6	3	5	0	5	0
2012–13	Waterloo Black Hawks	USHL	5	1	0	1	2	—	—	—	—	—
2013–14	USNTDP U-18	USHL	1	0	0	0	0	—	—	—	—	—
2013–14	Waterloo Black Hawks	USHL	49	21	28	49	4	12	8	7	15	0
2014–15	Waterloo Black Hawks	USHL	43	15	26	41	20	—	—	—	—	—
2014–15	Youngstown Phantoms	USHL	13	2	10	12	4	4	0	3	3	0
2015–16	U. of Minnesota	B1G	37	12	18	30	6	—	—	—	—	—
2016–17	U. of Minnesota	B1G	38	20	33	53	20	—	—	—	—	—
2017–18	U. of Minnesota	B1G	36	12	13	25	16	—	—	—	—	—
2018–19	U. of Minnesota	B1G	38	12	29	41	26	—	—	—	—	—
2018–19	Iowa Wild	AHL	5	0	0	0	0	—	—	—	—	—
2019–20	Iowa Wild	AHL	2	0	0	0	0	—	—	—	—	—
2019–20	Allen Americans	ECHL	47	26	44	70	4	—	—	—	—	—
2020–21	Iowa Wild	AHL	15	1	4	5	0	—	—	—	—	—
2020–21	Allen Americans	ECHL	16	2	12	14	2	7	1	2	3	0
2021–22	Nürnberg Ice Tigers	DEL	49	25	18	43	6	3	0	2	2	0
2022–23	Nürnberg Ice Tigers	DEL	53	12	22	34	4	2	0	0	0	2
2023–24	Straubing Tigers	DEL	50	11	14	25	6	12	2	1	3	15
AHL totals			22	1	4	5	0	—	—	—	—	—
DEL totals			152	48	54	102	16	17	2	3	5	17

== Awards and honors ==
Award	Year
Big Ten All-Tournament Team	2016
All-Big Ten First Team	2016–17
AHCA West First Team All-American	2016–17
All-Big Ten Second Team	2018–19

Awards and achievements
Preceded by Kyle Connor	Big Ten Scoring Champion; 2016–17; With: Mason Jobst	Succeeded by Cooper Marody
Preceded by Kyle Connor	Big Ten Player of the Year; 2016–17	Succeeded by Cale Morris
