= Kyle Hayton =

American ice hockey player (born 1994)

- Born: May 12, 1994 (age 32) Denver, Colorado, U.S.
- Height: 6 ft 0 in (183 cm)
- Weight: 161 lb (73 kg; 11 st 7 lb)
- Position: Goaltender
- Caught: Left
- Played for: Fort Wayne Komets; Allen Americans; Greenville Swamp Rabbits
- Playing career: 2014–2019

Kyle Hayton (born May 12, 1994) is an American former ice hockey goaltender. He was an All-American for St. Lawrence.

== Playing career ==
Hayton began attending St. Lawrence University in 2014 and was an instant hit for the Saints. He backstopped the team to its first 20-win season in six years and finished the year with some of the best numbers in the nation. He was named as the ECAC Hockey Rookie of the Year and there was hope that he would soon end the team's 8-year NCAA Tournament drought. Hayton's second season was a near-carbon copy of his freshman campaign, but that still left the team outside of the national tournament. After that season, head coach Greg Carvel left and was replaced by Mark Morris. Despite posting his worst statistical numbers to that point, Hayton was named to the All-American team as a junior but there were problems brewing behind the scenes. Many of the Saints' players were not happy with how Morris was running the team and the program began to hemorrhage talent.

During his third year, Hayton was able to earn enough credits to graduate a year early. He used his status to transfer to Wisconsin without having to sit out for a year (a then-NCAA requirement). Unfortunately, Hayton joined the Badgers just when the team was tumbling down the standings and he couldn't help them finish better than 6th in the Big Ten.

Hayton Began playing professionally the following season, spending time with three separate ECHL teams. The results were underwhelming, but Hayton resigned with the Greenville Swamp Rabbits in August for his second pro campaign. Less than two months later, however, Hayton decided to hang up his pads and ended his playing career.

After hockey, he worked as a financial representative for Northwestern Mutual before taking a position as a Trainee Appraiser for Integra Realty Resources (as of 2021).

== Career statistics ==
| Season | Team | League | GP | W | L | T/OTL | MIN | GA | SO | GAA | SV% |
|---|---|---|---|---|---|---|---|---|---|---|---|
| 2012–13 | Sioux City Musketeers | USHL | 25 | 13 | 8 | 4 | 1515 | 67 | 0 | 2.65 | .911 |
| 2013–14 | Sioux City Musketeers | USHL | 41 | 24 | 14 | 2 | 2290 | 103 | 2 | 2.70 | .914 |
| 2014–15 | St. Lawrence | ECAC Hockey | 36 | 20 | 13 | 3 | 2186 | 20 | 5 | 1.95 | .937 |
| 2015–16 | St. Lawrence | ECAC Hockey | 33 | 18 | 12 | 3 | 2027 | 69 | 3 | 2.04 | .935 |
| 2016–17 | St. Lawrence | ECAC Hockey | 35 | 16 | 12 | 7 | 2054 | 78 | 5 | 2.28 | .929 |
| 2017–18 | Wisconsin | Big Ten | 27 | 9 | 12 | 3 | 1514 | 78 | 0 | 3.09 | .890 |
| 2018–19 | Fort Wayne Komets | ECHL | 1 | 0 | 1 | 0 | 59 | 3 | 0 | 3.06 | .900 |
| 2018–19 | Allen Americans | ECHL | 17 | 4 | 10 | 0 | 826 | 49 | 1 | 3.56 | .893 |
| 2018–19 | Greenville Swamp Rabbits | ECHL | 6 | 2 | 4 | 0 | 356 | 18 | 0 | 3.03 | .903 |
| USHL totals | | | 66 | 37 | 22 | 6 | 3,805 | 170 | 2 | 2.68 | .913 |
| NCAA totals | | | 131 | 63 | 49 | 16 | 7,781 | 296 | 13 | 2.28 | .926 |
| ECHL totals | | | 24 | 6 | 15 | 0 | 1,241 | 70 | 1 | 3.38 | .896 |

== Awards and honors ==
| Award | Year |
|---|---|
| All-ECAC Hockey Rookie Team | 2014–15 |
| All-ECAC Hockey Second Team | 2014–15 |
| All-ECAC Hockey First Team | 2016–17 |
| AHCA East Second Team All-American | 2016–17 |

Awards and achievements
| Preceded by Sam Anas / Gavin Bayreuther | ECAC Hockey Rookie of the Year; 2014–15 | Succeeded by Joe Snively |
| Preceded by Alex Lyon | Ken Dryden Award; 2016–17 | Succeeded by Matthew Galajda |
