= The Pavilion at Pan Am =

Ice hockey arena in Indianapolis, Indiana, U.S.

- Interactive map of The Pavilion at Pan Am
- Former names: Pan American Arena (1987–2013); Pan Am Pavilion (2013–2019)
- Location: Indianapolis, Indiana, U.S.
- Coordinates: 39°45′50″N 86°09′38″W
- Owner: Indy Pavilion, LLC
- Operator: Indy Pavilion, LLC
- Capacity: 3,000
- Surface: Concrete

Construction
- Opened: 1987
- Demolished: 2024

Tenants
- Indianapolis Inferno (GLJHL) (2010–2012); Indiana Ice (USHL) (2012–2014)

Website
- www.indypavilion.com

The Pavilion at Pan Am, originally Pan American Arena, was a twin rink ice hockey and skating arena located in downtown Indianapolis, Indiana, U.S. and part of the broader Pan American Plaza, which was built in commemoration of the 1987 Pan American Games held in Indianapolis. The arena is now the largest independently own live music venue in Indianapolis operated Indy Pavilion LLC owners Cebronica Luft, Jason Jenkins and Jason Stellema.

The Pavilion at Pan Am was operated by the Indiana/World Skating Academy and has one standard 85-by-200-foot (26 by 61 m) ice rink (NHL size) and one 100-by-200-foot (30 by 61 m) ice rink (Olympic Games size). These high quality rinks, coupled with a research center devoted to testing skaters' athletic prowess, has established The Pavilion at Pan Am as a primary training site for striving young hockey players and figure skaters.

Following the suspension of operations by the Indiana/World Skating Academy in April 2013, Pan Am Sports Incorporated assumed day-to-day operational responsibility for the ice rinks at Pan Am Plaza. With the change in management, the facility was also rebranded as Pan Am Pavilion and served as the official training facility of the Indiana Ice, a member of the United States Hockey League, until late 2014.

In 2015, Indy Pavilion LLC took over the facility and rebranded it as the Pavilion at Pan Am, a live events center. To date, the venue has played host to over 600 events and has been a staple to the Indianapolis music scene and Downtown economy.

The Pavilion at Pan Am plaza was demolished in March 2024 to make way for a new Hilton Signia Hotel.
