= Chase Pearson =

Canadian ice hockey player

- Born: August 23, 1997 (age 28) Cornwall, Ontario
- Height: 6 ft 3 in (191 cm)
- Weight: 202 lb (92 kg; 14 st 6 lb)
- Position: Centre
- Shoots: Left
- EIHL team Former teams: Nottingham Panthers; Detroit Red Wings; HK Dukla Michalovce; Villacher SV
- NHL draft: 140th overall, 2015; Detroit Red Wings
- Playing career: 2019–present

Chase Pearson (born August 23, 1997) is a Canadian professional ice hockey centre who currently plays for EIHL team Nottingham Panthers. He was drafted 140th overall by the Detroit Red Wings in the 2015 NHL entry draft.

== Playing career ==
Pearson played college ice hockey at the University of Maine where he was a two-time captain. During his three years at Maine he recorded 37 goals and 41 assists in 107 games. During the 2018–19 season he was named the Hockey East Best Defensive Forward and was named to the Hockey East All-Second Team.

On March 18, 2019, Pearson signed a two-year, entry-level contract with the Detroit Red Wings. He was assigned to the Red Wings' AHL affiliate, the Grand Rapids Griffins following the conclusion of his collegiate career. During the 2018–19 season, he recorded two goals in ten games for the Griffins.

During the 2019–20 season, in his first full professional season, he recorded eight goals and 14 assists in 59 games, during a season that was cancelled due to the COVID-19 pandemic. During the 2020–21 season, in his second full professional season, he ranked third on the Griffins in scoring with eight goals and 14 assists in 28 games. On August 5, 2021, the Red Wings re-signed Pearson to a one-year contract.

Pearson made his professional debut for the Red Wings on March 24, 2022. During the 2021–22 season, he recorded four hits and 7:40 average time on ice in three games with the Red Wings. On July 21, 2022, the Red Wings re-signed Pearson to a one-year, two-way contract.

On September 8, 2023, Pearson left North America as a free agent and was signed to a one-year contract with Slovak Extraliga team HK Dukla Michalovce.

In July 2024, Pearson signed with Villacher SV of the ICEHL.

On June 3, 2025, Pearson signed a one-year contract with the Nottingham Panthers of the EIHL for the 2025-26 season, joining his former University of Maine teammates Mitch Fossier and Tim Doherty.

== Personal life ==
Pearson was born in Cornwall, Ontario, and grew up in Alpharetta, Georgia. Pearson's father, Scott, is a former professional ice hockey player, who played in 292 NHL games.

== Career statistics ==
			Regular season					Playoffs
Season	Team	League	GP	G	A	Pts	PIM	GP	G	A	Pts	PIM
2013–14	Cornwall Colts	CCHL	39	8	15	23	18	5	0	1	1	2
2013–14	Youngstown Phantoms	USHL	2	0	0	0	0	—	—	—	—	—
2014–15	Youngstown Phantoms	USHL	57	12	14	26	96	4	0	2	2	0
2015–16	Youngstown Phantoms	USHL	55	12	38	50	61	—	—	—	—	—
2016–17	Maine Black Bears	HE	36	14	8	22	56	—	—	—	—	—
2017–18	Maine Black Bears	HE	37	7	20	27	42	—	—	—	—	—
2018–19	Maine Black Bears	HE	34	16	13	29	34	—	—	—	—	—
2018–19	Grand Rapids Griffins	AHL	10	2	0	2	2	—	—	—	—	—
2019–20	Grand Rapids Griffins	AHL	59	8	14	22	17	—	—	—	—	—
2020–21	Grand Rapids Griffins	AHL	28	8	14	22	4	—	—	—	—	—
2021–22	Grand Rapids Griffins	AHL	50	7	11	18	18	—	—	—	—	—
2021–22	Detroit Red Wings	NHL	3	0	0	0	0	—	—	—	—	—
2022–23	Grand Rapids Griffins	AHL	47	4	10	14	35	—	—	—	—	—
2023–24	HK Dukla Michalovce	Slovak	23	17	12	29	32	—	—	—	—	—
2024–25	Villacher SV	ICEHL	38	19	14	33	18	4	1	1	2	6
NHL totals			3	0	0	0	0	—	—	—	—	—

== Awards and honours ==
Honors	Year
College
HE Best Defensive Forward	2019
All-HE Second Team	2019
