= Indiana Ice =

American junior ice hockey team

- City: Indianapolis, Indiana
- League: USHL
- Founded: 1988 (In the NAHL)
- Operated: 2004–2014
- Folded: 2014
- Colors: Navy blue, ice blue, white
- Owner: Paul Skjodt

Franchise history
- 1988–1989: Western Michigan Wolves
- 1989–1994: Kalamazoo Jr. Wings
- 1994–2004: Danville Wings
- 2004–2014: Indiana Ice

Championships
- Regular season titles: 0 Anderson Cups
- Playoff championships: 2 Clark Cups (2009 and 2014)

The Indiana Ice was a Tier I junior ice hockey team and member club of the United States Hockey League (USHL) that was formed in 2004 when the Danville Wings were purchased and moved from their location in Danville, Illinois, to Indianapolis, Indiana. The Ice captured the regular season division titles in the 2007–08 and 2013–14 seasons and won the 2009 and 2014 Clark Cup titles. Before the 2012–13 season, the Ice played their home games at the Indiana Farmers Coliseum. From 2012 to 2014, the Ice split their home games between the Bankers Life Fieldhouse and the Pan American Arena. The Ice played in the Eastern Conference/Division of the United States Hockey League.

The USHL had granted the team dormancy status for the 2014–15 season while the organization focused on the development of a new facility. In January 2015, the USHL approved of the team's proposed future home, the Lyceum Pavilion, in the Indianapolis area. During this time, the Indiana Ice organization remained a member club in the USHL, with membership on its board and full rights to participate in the business and operations of the league. Since then, there have been no updates on the status of the team.

== Season-by-season record ==
Season	GP	W	L	OTL	PTS	GF	GA	PIM	Regular Season Finish	Playoff Results
2004–05	60	20	33	7	47	169	209	1341	4th, Eastern Division	Lost in first round
2005–06	60	25	29	6	56	186	224	1274	4th, Eastern Division	Lost in first round
2006–07	60	27	28	5	59	182	223	1758	3rd, Eastern Division	Lost in semifinals
2007–08	60	39	15	6	84	223	193	1305	Eastern Division Champions	Lost in first round
2008–09	60	39	19	2	80	221	177	1060	3rd, Eastern Division	Clark Cup Champions
2009–10	60	33	24	3	69	199	187	816	3rd, Eastern Division	Lost in semifinals
2010–11	60	37	19	4	78	237	166	897	3rd, Eastern Division	Lost in 2nd round
2011–12	60	36	15	9	81	221	183	985	2nd, Eastern Division	Lost in semifinals
2012–13	64	21	37	6	48	181	249	816	8th, Eastern Division	Did not qualify
2013–14	60	42	11	7	91	233	144	856	Eastern Conference Champions	Clark Cup Champions

== Season-by-season playoff record ==
- 2004–05: Lost to Cedar Rapids 3 games to none in quarterfinals; the RoughRiders eventually won the Clark Cup title.
- 2005–06: Lost to Cedar Rapids RoughRiders 3 games to 2 in quarterfinals; the Ice held a 2–1 series lead before losing the last 2 games.
- 2006–07: Swept Green Bay 4 games to 0 in first round; defeated Waterloo & Cedar Rapids in round-robin pool play in Round 2; lost to eventual Clark Cup Champion Sioux Falls 3–2 in O.T. in Clark Cup Semifinals
- 2007–08: Lost to Chicago 3 games to 1 in quarterfinals.
- 2008–09: Defeated Cedar Rapids 3 games to 2 in quarterfinals; defeated Green Bay 3 games to 1 in East Division Finals; defeated Fargo 3 games to 1 to win the Clark Cup Finals.
- 2009–10: Defeated the Cedar Rapids 3 games to 2 in quarterfinals; lost to Green Bay 3 games to 1 in East Division Finals
- 2010–11: Defeated the Waterloo 2 games to 0 in first round; lost to Green Bay 3 games to 0 in Eastern Quarterfinals
- 2011–12: Defeated Dubuque 3 games to 0 in Eastern Conference Semifinals; lost to Green Bay 3 games to 0 in conference finals
- 2013–14: Defeated Green Bay 3 games to 1 in quarterfinals; defeated Dubuque 3 games to 0 in Eastern Conference Finals; defeated Waterloo 3 games to 2 to win the Clark Cup Finals.

== NHL draft picks ==
The following table shows NHL draft picks that have played for the Ice. The tenure column indicates whether they were drafted while on the Ice roster, prior to arriving, or after moving on to college or major junior.

Player	Draft Year	Round	Overall	Team	Tenure
Joshua Jacobs	2014	2	41	New Jersey	Iceman
Rinat Valiev	2014	3	68	Toronto	After Ice
Blake Siebenaler	2014	3	77	Columbus	After Ice
Ryan Mantha	2014	4	104	New York Rangers	Iceman
Dwyer Tschantz	2014	7	202	St. Louis	Iceman
Adam Erne	2013	2	33	Tampa Bay	After Ice
Justin Bailey	2013	2	52	Buffalo	After Ice
Aidan Muir	2013	4	113	Edmonton	Before Ice
Brian Pinho	2013	6	174	Washington	Before Ice
Cristoval Nieves	2012	2	59	New York Rangers	Iceman
Jon Gillies	2012	3	75	Calgary	Iceman
Robbie Baillargeon	2012	5	136	Ottawa	Iceman
Blake Coleman	2011	3	75	New Jersey	Iceman
Brian Ferlin	2011	4	121	Boston	Iceman
Sean Kuraly	2011	5	133	San Jose	Iceman
Stanislav Galiev	2010	3	86	Washington	After Ice
Anthony Bitetto	2010	6	168	Nashville	Iceman
Nick Mattson	2010	6	180	Chicago	Iceman
RJ Boyd	2010	7	183	Florida	Before Ice
Nic Dowd	2009	7	198	Los Angeles	Before Ice
Mike Cichy	2009	7	199	Montreal	Iceman
John Carlson	2008	1	27	Washington	Iceman
Corey Fienhage	2008	3	81	Buffalo	Iceman
Garrett Roe	2008	7	183	Los Angeles	After Ice
Ben Blood	2007	4	120	Ottawa	Before Ice
Brett Bruneteau	2007	4	108	Washington	Before Ice
Paul Carey	2007	5	135	Colorado	Before Ice
Scott Darling	2007	6	153	Phoenix	Before Ice
Brett Bennett	2006	5	130	Phoenix	Before Ice
Brent Gwidt	2006	6	157	Washington	Before Ice
Alex Kangas	2006	5	135	Atlanta	Before Ice
Brian Gifford	2004	3	85	Pittsburgh	Before Ice
Sergei Kukushkin	2004	7	218	Dallas	Before Ice

== NHL Icemen ==
The following table shows Indiana Ice players that have made it to the NHL.

Player	Ice Season(s)	Most Recent NHL Team	NHL Seasons
Joel Rechlicz	2005–06	Washington Capitals	2008–2012
John Carlson	2006–08	Washington Capitals	2009–
Torey Krug	2008–09	St. Louis Blues	2012–
Cameron Schilling	2007–08	Winnipeg Jets	2013–2019
Paul Carey	2007–08	Boston Bruins	2013–2020
Anthony Bitetto	2008–10	New York Rangers	2014–
Daniil Tarasov	2010–12	San Jose Sharks	2014–15
Brian Ferlin	2009–11	Boston Bruins	2014–2015
Stanislav Galiev	2008–09	Washington Capitals	2014–2016
Scott Darling	2007–08	Carolina Hurricanes	2014–
Justin Bailey	2011–12	Vancouver Canucks	2015–
Rinat Valiev	2012–13	Montreal Canadiens	2015–2018
Cristoval Nieves	2011–12	New York Rangers	2016–2020
Sean Kuraly	2010–12	Columbus Blue Jackets	2016–
Adam Erne	2010-11	Detroit Red Wings	2016–
Casey DeSmith	2009-11	Pittsburgh Penguins	2016–

== Head-to-head record ==
Through 2013–14 Season

Opponent	Overall			Home			Road			Pct.
Opponent	W	L	OTL	W	L	OTL	W	L	OTL	Pct.
Cedar Rapids RoughRiders	24	28	8	11	12	6	13	16	2	0.467
Chicago Steel	47	20	4	27	6	3	20	14	1	0.690
Des Moines Buccaneers	25	17	3	16	6	1	9	11	2	0.589
Dubuque Fighting Saints	6	9	1	4	3	1	2	6	0	0.406
Fargo Force	8	6	0	4	2	0	4	4	0	0.571
Green Bay Gamblers	29	32	4	15	15	3	14	17	1	0.477
Lincoln Stars	17	12	2	10	5	0	7	7	2	0.581
Ohio Junior Blue Jackets	11	5	0	7	1	0	4	4	0	0.688
Omaha Lancers	14	12	5	6	6	3	8	6	2	0.532
Sioux City Musketeers	15	12	4	10	5	1	5	7	3	0.548
Sioux Falls Stampede	14	14	3	9	5	2	5	9	1	0.500
Tri-City Storm	18	10	3	11	5	1	7	5	2	0.629
Team USA	23	11	3	13	5	1	10	6	2	0.662
Waterloo Blackhawks	30	19	6	19	4	4	11	15	2	0.600
Youngstown Phantoms	22	13	4	10	5	2	12	8	2	0.615

== Head coach history ==
Coach	Seasons	W	L	OTL	PTS	PCT	Playoff W	L	PCT
Red Gendron	2004–05	18	30	5	41	0.387	---	---	---
Dean Grillo	2005–06	14	21	6	34	0.415	0	3	0.000
Jack Bowkus	2006–07	13	11	2	34	0.538	2	3	0.400
Scott McConnell	2007	1	1	0	2	0.500	---	---	---
Charlie Skjodt	2007–08,10–11,12	78	34	10	166	0.680	12	10	0.545
Jeff Blashill	2008–10	72	43	5	149	0.621	13	9	0.591
Kyle Wallack	2011–12	34	15	9	77	0.664	---	---	---
Ron Gay	2012	7	16	1	15	0.313	---	---	---
Jeff Brown	2012–14	56	32	12	124	0.620	9	3	0.750

Coaching changes:

- Dean Grillo replaced Red Gendron with seven games remaining in the 2004–05 season.
- Jack Bowkus replaced Dean Grillo after thirty-four games in the 2005–06 season.
- Scott McConnell served as interim head coach for the last two games of the 2006–07 season.
- Charlie Skjodt took over at the start of the 2007 playoffs.
- 5/13/08 – The Indiana Ice announced that head coach Charlie Skjodt had resigned as head coach to become the Indiana Ice's President of Hockey Operations
- 5/14/08 – The Ice announced the hiring of Jeff Blashill as the new head coach of the Indiana Ice. Blashill was a former assistant coach at Miami University
- 4/7/10 – Blashill is announced as the new head coach at Western Michigan University
- 5/25/10 – The Ice announce the return of Charlie Skjodt to the head coach position
- 5/5/11 – The Ice promote Charlie Skjodt to president of the club, vacating the head coach position.
- 6/1/11 – Kyle Wallack is named head coach and general manager. Wallack was previously associate head coach at Yale University.
- 4/9/12 – Kyle Wallack relieved of duties. Charlie Skjodt takes over head coaching duties.
- 5/30/12 – Ron Gay promoted to head coach and general manager.
- 12/4/12 – Jeff Brown hired as new head coach and GM. Ron Gay reassigned.
