= 2014–15 NCAA Division I men's ice hockey season =

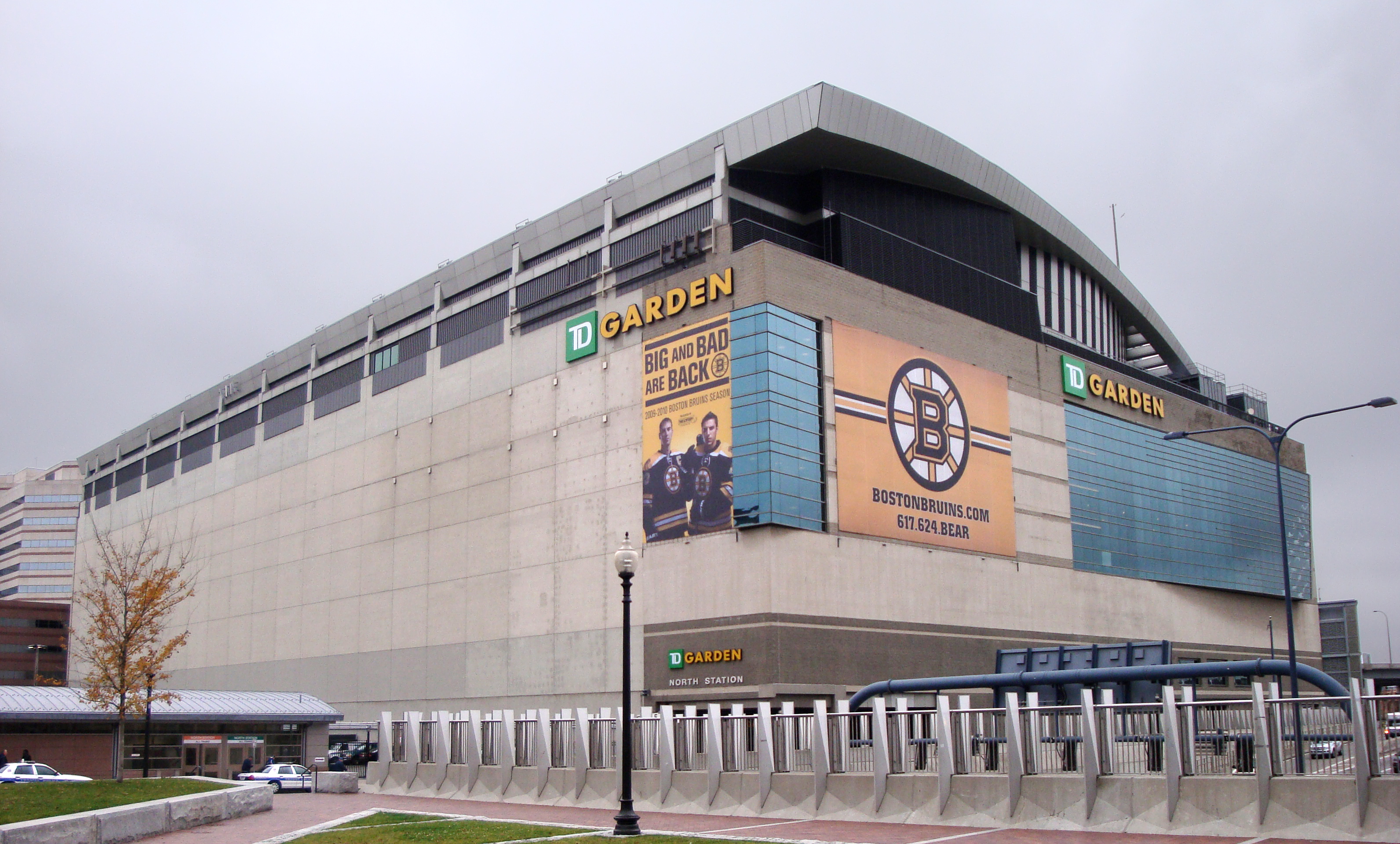
- The TD Garden in Boston hosted the 2015 Frozen Four
- Duration: October 4, 2014– April 11, 2015
- NCAA tournament: 2015
- National championship: TD Garden; Boston, Massachusetts
- NCAA champion: Providence
- Hobey Baker Award: Jack Eichel (Boston University)

The 2014–15 NCAA Division I men's ice hockey season began in October 2014 and ended with the 2015 NCAA Division I Men's Ice Hockey Tournament's championship game in April 2015. This was the 68th season in which an NCAA ice hockey championship was held, and the 121st year overall in which an NCAA school fielded a team.

== Conference realignment ==
The only conference membership change in the 2014 offseason was the move of the Connecticut Huskies from Atlantic Hockey to Hockey East, which was already home to the UConn women's team.

School	Former Conference	New Conference
Connecticut Huskies	Atlantic Hockey	Hockey East

== Season Outlook ==
=== Pre-season polls ===
The top teams in the nation as ranked before the start of the season.

The U.S. College Hockey Online poll was voted on by coaches, media, and NHL scouts. The USA Today/USA Hockey Magazine poll was voted on by coaches and media.

USCHO Poll
Rank	Team
1	Minnesota (36)
2	North Dakota (2)
3	Providence (2)
4	Boston College
5	Union (9)
6	Colgate (1)
7	St. Cloud
8	Michigan
9	Ferris State
10	Wisconsin (1)
11	Miami (OH)
11	Notre Dame
13	Minnesota State
14	Cornell
15	Quinnipiac
16	Northeastern
17	UMass Lowell
18	Denver
19	New Hampshire
20	Boston University

USA Today Poll
Rank	Team
1	Minnesota (32)
2	North Dakota (1)
3	Providence
4	Boston College
5	Colgate
6	St. Cloud
7	Michigan
8	Union (1)
9	Miami (OH)
10	Ferris State
11	Notre Dame
12	Wisconsin
13	Minnesota State
14	Cornell
15	Denver

== Regular season ==
=== Standings ===
- 2014–15 Atlantic Hockey standings
  	Conference record							Overall record					
  	GP	W	L	T	PTS	GF	GA	GP	W	L	T	GF	GA
  Robert Morris †	28	19	5	4	42	106	66	37	24	8	5	133	90
  Canisius	28	15	7	6	36	78	60	37	18	12	7	95	82
  #16 RIT *	28	14	9	5	33	90	62	40	20	15	5	121	96
  Bentley	28	14	9	5	33	76	67	37	17	15	5	100	92
  Mercyhurst	28	14	11	3	31	90	87	39	19	16	4	116	122
  Holy Cross	28	12	11	5	29	68	61	37	14	18	5	84	87
  Air Force	28	13	12	3	29	82	82	41	16	21	4	119	130
  Sacred Heart	28	10	12	6	26	77	82	38	13	19	6	96	113
  Army	28	8	16	4	20	60	84	34	8	22	4	68	108
  American International	28	4	17	7	15	69	107	36	4	25	7	87	155
  Niagara	28	5	19	4	14	65	103	39	7	28	4	85	157
  Championship: March 21, 2015 † indicates conference regular season champion; * indicates conference tournament champion Rankings: USCHO.com Top 20 Poll; updated March 23, 2015
- 2014–15 Big Ten ice hockey standings
  	Conference record								Overall record					
  	GP	W	L	T	SOW	PTS	GF	GA	GP	W	L	T	GF	GA
  #12 Minnesota^{†}^{*}	20	12	5	3	0	39	81	54	39	23	13	3	137	982
  Michigan State	20	11	7	2	2	37	47	42	35	17	16	2	83	80
  #20 Michigan	20	12	8	0	0	36	88	60	37	22	15	0	143	107
  Penn State	20	10	9	1	0	31	62	66	37	18	15	4	119	113
  Ohio State	20	8	11	1	0	26	56	71	36	14	19	3	98	117
  Wisconsin	20	2	15	3	2	11	34	75	35	4	26	5	59	129
  Championship: March 21, 2015 † indicates conference regular season champion; * indicates conference tournament champion Rankings: USCHO.com Top 20 Poll; updated March 14, 2015
- 2014–15 ECAC Hockey men's standings
  	Conference record							Overall record					
  	GP	W	L	T	PTS	GF	GA	GP	W	L	T	GF	GA
  #14 Quinnipiac^{†}	22	16	3	3	35	60	37	39	23	12	4	106	89
  St. Lawrence	22	14	7	1	29	70	41	37	20	14	3	113	75
  #15 Yale	22	12	6	4	28	60	37	33	18	10	5	86	54
  #19 Colgate	22	11	7	4	26	53	51	38	22	12	4	102	82
  Dartmouth	22	12	8	2	26	64	55	33	17	12	4	91	78
  #11 Harvard*	22	11	8	3	25	71	54	37	21	13	3	121	92
  Cornell	22	9	9	4	22	45	46	31	11	14	6	57	68
  Clarkson	22	8	11	3	19	49	47	37	12	20	5	81	87
  Rensselaer	22	8	12	2	18	53	66	41	12	26	3	77	131
  Union	22	8	13	1	17	58	63	39	19	18	2	122	104
  Brown	22	5	14	3	13	44	80	31	8	20	3	65	112
  Princeton	22	2	18	2	6	25	75	30	4	23	3	39	99
  Championship: March 21, 2015 † indicates conference regular season champion (Cleary Cup) * indicates conference tournament champion (Whitelaw Cup); Rankings: USCHO.com Top 20 Poll; updated March 9, 2015
- 2014–15 Hockey East men's standings
  	Conference record							Overall record					
  	GP	W	L	T	PTS	GF	GA	GP	W	L	T	GF	GA
  #2 Boston University †*	22	14	5	3	31	88	55	41	28	8	5	158	95
  #1 Providence	22	13	8	1	27	61	37	41	26	13	2	123	84
  #13 Boston College	22	12	7	3	27	60	50	38	21	14	3	107	91
  #17 Massachusetts–Lowell	22	11	7	4	26	70	52	39	21	12	6	134	101
  Notre Dame	22	10	7	5	25	64	54	42	18	19	5	126	116
  Northeastern	22	11	9	2	24	70	69	36	16	16	4	107	107
  Vermont	22	10	9	3	23	62	53	41	22	15	4	110	91
  New Hampshire	22	10	11	1	21	66	68	40	19	19	2	119	109
  Connecticut	22	7	11	4	18	42	74	36	10	19	7	66	111
  Maine	22	8	12	2	18	64	74	39	14	22	3	108	127
  Merrimack	22	5	14	3	13	38	56	38	16	18	4	81	93
  Massachusetts	22	5	16	1	11	59	102	36	11	23	2	99	152
  Championship: March 21, 2015 † indicates conference regular season champion; * indicates conference tournament champion Rankings: USCHO.com Top 20 Poll; updated March 9, 2015
- 2014–15 National Collegiate Hockey Conference standings
  	Conference record								Overall record					
  	GP	W	L	T	SOW	PTS	GF	GA	GP	W	L	T	GF	GA
  #3 North Dakota†	24	16	6	2	0	50	72	55	42	29	10	3	138	94
  #8 Miami *	24	14	9	1	1	44	73	60	40	25	14	1	130	100
  #4 Omaha	24	12	8	4	3	43	67	56	39	20	13	6	105	90
  #5 Denver	24	13	10	1	1	41	79	68	40	24	14	2	131	99
  #6 Minnesota–Duluth	24	12	9	3	0	39	68	59	40	21	16	3	115	97
  #10 St. Cloud State	24	11	12	1	0	34	69	56	40	20	19	1	109	97
  Western Michigan	24	6	13	5	4	27	51	73	37	14	18	5	98	107
  Colorado College	24	2	19	3	1	10	43	95	35	6	26	3	74	136
  Championship: March 21, 2015 † indicates conference regular season champion; * indicates conference tournament champion Rankings: USCHO.com Top 20 Poll; updated March 23, 2015
- 2014–15 Western Collegiate Hockey Association standings
  	Conference record							Overall record					
  	GP	W	L	T	PTS	GF	GA	GP	W	L	T	GF	GA
  #7 Minnesota State †*	28	21	4	3	45	98	47	40	29	8	3	145	77
  #9 Michigan Tech	28	21	5	2	44	103	48	41	29	10	2	144	74
  #18 Bowling Green	28	17	8	3	37	87	66	39	23	11	5	119	93
  Alaska^	28	14	12	2	30	75	69	34	19	13	2	92	81
  Bemidji State	28	12	11	5	29	73	62	38	16	17	5	101	90
  Ferris State	28	13	14	1	27	66	58	40	18	20	2	88	88
  Northern Michigan	28	11	13	4	26	59	71	38	14	18	6	86	100
  Alabama–Huntsville	28	7	20	1	15	44	95	38	8	26	4	62	121
  Lake Superior State	28	7	20	1	15	44	91	38	8	28	2	60	131
  Alaska Anchorage	28	5	21	2	12	52	94	34	8	22	4	70	107
  Championship: March 21, 2015 † indicates conference regular season champion (MacNaughton Cup); * indicates conference tournament champion (Broadmoor Trophy)^ indicates ineligible for postseason play due to NCAA sanctions Rankings: USCHO.com Top 20 Poll; updated March 9, 2015

== 2015 NCAA Tournament ==
Regional Semi-finals
1	Minnesota State	1
4	RIT	2
Midwest Regional
2	Omaha	4
3	Harvard	1
1	Miami	5
4	Providence	7
East Regional
2	Denver	5
3	Boston College	2
1	North Dakota	4
4	Quinnipiac	1
West Regional
2	Michigan Tech	2
3	St. Cloud State	3*
1	Boston University	3*
4	Yale	2
Northeast Regional
2	Minnesota–Duluth	4
3	Minnesota	1

Regional Finals
4	RIT	0
2	Omaha	4
4	Providence	4
2	Denver	1
1	North Dakota	4
3	St. Cloud State	1
1	Boston University	3
2	Minnesota–Duluth	2

Frozen Four
MW2	Omaha	1
E4	Providence	4
W1	North Dakota	3
NE1	Boston University	5

National Championship
E4	Providence	4
NE1	Boston University	3

Note: * denotes overtime period(s)

== Player stats ==
=== Scoring leaders ===
GP = Games played; G = Goals; A = Assists; Pts = Points; PIM = Penalty minutes

Player	Class	Team	GP	G	A	Pts	PIM
Jack Eichel	Freshman	Boston University	40	26	45	71	28
Evan Rodrigues	Senior	Boston University	41	21	40	61	31
Jimmy Vesey	Junior	Harvard	37	32	26	58	21
Matt Garbowsky	Senior	RIT	40	26	28	54	28
Zach Hyman	Senior	Michigan	37	22	32	54	10
Josh Mitchell	Junior	RIT	40	16	36	52	32
Daniel Ciampini	Senior	Union	39	26	24	50	30
Danny O'Regan	Junior	Boston University	41	23	27	50	26
Mike Vecchione	Sophomore	Union	39	19	31	50	20
Kyle Criscuolo	Junior	Harvard	37	17	31	48	12

=== Leading goaltenders ===
GP = Games played; Min = Minutes played; W = Wins; L = Losses; T = Ties; GA = Goals against; SO = Shutouts; SV% = Save percentage; GAA = Goals against average

Player	Class	Team	GP	Min	W	L	T	GA	SO	SV%	GAA
Alex Lyon	Sophomore	Yale	32	1925:05	17	10	5	52	7	.939	1.62
Stephon Williams	Junior	Minnesota State	35	1999:15	25	6	3	55	5	.925	1.65
Jamie Phillips	Junior	Michigan Tech	41	2417:18	28	9	2	70	6	.933	1.74
Michael Bitzer	Freshman	Bemidji State	28	1730:06	14	11	3	52	4	.929	1.80
Kyle Hayton	Freshman	St. Lawrence	36	2186:05	20	13	3	71	5	.937	1.95
Ryan Massa	Senior	Omaha	29	1652:40	14	8	6	54	2	.939	1.96
Keegan Asmundson	Senior	Canisius	26	1527:11	13	8	4	50	2	.930	1.96
James Kruger	Junior	Dartmouth	26	1575:36	13	9	4	52	3	.926	1.98
Sean Cahill	Senior	Alaska	16	967:50	9	6	1	32	2	.919	1.98
Mitch Gillam	Sophomore	Cornell	27	1476:22	9	9	5	49	1	.927	1.99

== Awards ==
=== NCAA ===
Award		Recipient
Hobey Baker Award		Jack Eichel, Boston University
Spencer T. Penrose Award		Mike Hastings, Minnesota State
Tim Taylor Award		Jack Eichel, Boston University
Mike Richter Award		Zane McIntyre, North Dakota
Derek Hines Unsung Hero Award		P. J. Musico, Penn State
Lowe's Senior CLASS Award		Spiro Goulakos, Colgate
Tournament Most Outstanding Player		Jon Gillies, Providence
AHCA All-American Teams
East First Team	Position	West First Team
Alex Lyon, Yale	G	Jake Hildebrand, Michigan State
Matt Grzelcyk, Boston University	D	Joey LaLeggia, Denver
Rob O'Gara, Yale	D	Mike Reilly, Minnesota
Daniel Ciampini, Union	F	Zach Hyman, Michigan
Jack Eichel, Boston University	F	Tanner Kero, Michigan Tech
Jimmy Vesey, Harvard	F	Matt Leitner, Minnesota State
East Second Team	Position	West Second Team
Jon Gillies, Providence	G	Zane McIntyre, North Dakota
Mike Paliotta, Vermont	D	Zach Palmquist, Minnesota State
Robbie Russo, Notre Dame	D	Colton Parayko, Alaska
Sam Anas, Quinnipiac	F	Austin Czarnik, Miami
Matt Garbowsky, RIT	F	Dylan Larkin, Michigan
Kevin Roy, Northeastern	F	Michael Mersch, Wisconsin
	F	Trevor Moore, Denver

=== Atlantic Hockey ===
Award		Recipient
Player of the Year		Matt Garbowsky, RIT
Rookie of the Year		Tyler Pham, Army
Best Defensive Forward		Matt Garbowsky, RIT
Best Defenseman		Steven Weinstein, Bentley
Individual Sportsmanship		Zak Zaremba, Army
Regular Season Scoring Trophy		Matt Garbowsky, RIT
Regular Season Goaltending Award		Keegan Asmundson, Canisius
Team Sportsmanship Award		American International College
Coach of the Year		Derek Schooley, Robert Morris
Most Valuable Player in Tournament		Matt Garbowsky, RIT
All-Atlantic Hockey Teams
First Team	Position	Second Team
Matt Ginn, Holy Cross	G	Keegan Asmundson, Canisius
Steven Weinstein, Bentley	D	Brady Norrish, RIT
Chris Rumble, Canisius	D	Ryan Misiak, Mercyhurst
Matt Garbowsky, RIT	F	Ralph Cuddemi, Canisius
Cody Wydo, Robert Morris	F	Josh Mitchell, RIT
Andrew Gladiuk, Bentley	F	Cole Gunner, Air Force
Third Team	Position	Rookie Team
Jayson Argue, Bentley	G	Jayson Argue, Bentley
Dalton Izyk, Robert Morris	G	–
Alexander Kuqali, RIT	D	Brady Norrish, RIT
Chase Golightly, Robert Morris	D	Keegan Harper, Niagara
Daniel Bahntge, Mercyhurst	F	Tyler Pham, Army
Zac Lynch, Robert Morris	F	Jack Riley, Mercyhurst
Brad McGowan, RIT	F	Brady Ferguson, Robert Morris

=== Big Ten ===
Award		Recipient
Player of the Year		Jake Hildebrand, Michigan State
Defensive Player of the Year		Mike Reilly, Minnesota
Goaltender of the Year		Jake Hildebrand, Michigan State
Freshman of the Year		Dylan Larkin, Michigan
Scoring Champion		Zach Hyman, Michigan
Coach of the Year		Guy Gadowsky, Penn State
Tournament Most Outstanding Player		Adam Wilcox, Minnesota
All-Big Ten Teams
First Team	Position	Second Team
Jake Hildebrand, Michigan State	G	Adam Wilcox, Minnesota
Zach Werenski, Michigan	D	Michael Downing, Michigan
Mike Reilly, Minnesota	D	Travis Walsh, Michigan State
Zach Hyman, Michigan	F	Andrew Copp, Michigan
Dylan Larkin, Michigan	F	Travis Boyd, Minnesota
Casey Bailey, Penn State	F	Kyle Rau, Minnesota
Honorable Mention	Position	Freshman Team
P. J. Musico, Penn State	G	–
Brady Skjei, Minnesota	D	Zach Werenski, Michigan
Nate Jensen, Penn State	D	Josh Jacobs, Michigan State
Luke Juha, Penn State	D	–
Patrick Koudys, Penn State	D	–
Matt Berry, Michigan State	F	Dylan Larkin, Michigan
Anthony Greco, Ohio State	F	Matthew Weis, Ohio State
David Goodwin, Penn State	F	Scott Conway, Penn State
Taylor Holstrom, Penn State	F	–

=== ECAC ===
Award		Recipient
Player of the Year		Jimmy Vesey, Harvard
Best Defensive Forward		Cole Bardreau, Cornell
Best Defensive Defenseman		Rob O'Gara, Yale
Rookie of the Year		Kyle Hayton, St. Lawrence
Ken Dryden Award		Alex Lyon, Yale
Sportmanship Award		Yale
Student-Athlete of the Year		Kyle Criscuolo, Harvard
Tim Taylor Award		Greg Carvel, St. Lawrence
Most Outstanding Player in Tournament		Jimmy Vesey, Harvard
All-ECAC Hockey Teams
First Team	Position	Second Team
Alex Lyon, Yale	G	Kyle Hayton, St. Lawrence
Rob O'Gara, Yale	D	Eric Sweetman, St. Lawrence
Joakim Ryan, Cornell	D	Patrick McNally, Harvard
Daniel Ciampini, Union	F	Sam Anas, Quinnipiac
Matthew Peca, Quinnipiac	F	Kyle Criscuolo, Harvard
Jimmy Vesey, Harvard	F	Eric Neiley, Dartmouth
Third Team	Position	Rookie Team
Michael Garteig, Quinnipiac	G	Kyle Hayton, St. Lawrence
Danny Federico, Quinnipiac	D	Nolan Gluchowski, St. Lawrence
Jeff Taylor, Union	D	Kelly Summers, Clarkson
Cole Bardreau, Cornell	F	Spencer Foo, Union
Kyle Baun, Colgate	F	Drew Melanson, Rensselaer
Tyson Spink, Colgate	F	Landon Smith, Quinnipiac

=== Hockey East ===
Award		Recipient
Player of the Year		Jack Eichel, Boston University
Best Defensive Forward		Noel Acciari, Providence
Best Defensive Defenseman		Mike Paliotta, Vermont
Rookie of the Year		Jack Eichel, Boston University
Goaltending Champion		Jon Gillies, Providence
Len Ceglarski Award		Michael Sit, Boston College
Three-Stars Award		Jack Eichel, Boston University
Scoring Champion		Jack Eichel, Boston University
Charlie Holt Team Sportsmanship Award		Vermont
Bob Kullen Coach of the Year Award		David Quinn, Boston University
William Flynn Tournament Most Valuable Player		Jack Eichel, Boston University
All-Hockey East Teams
First Team	Position	Second Team
Jon Gillies, Providence	G	Matt O'Connor, Boston University
Matt Grzelcyk, Boston University	D	Noah Hanifin, Boston College
Robbie Russo, Notre Dame	D	Mike Paliotta, Vermont
Jack Eichel, Boston University	F	Danny O'Regan, Boston University
Kevin Roy, Northeastern	F	Evan Rodrigues, Boston University
Vince Hinostroza, Notre Dame	F	Devin Shore, Maine
Honorable Mention	Position	Rookie Team
Thatcher Demko, Boston College	G	Cal Petersen, Notre Dame
Rasmus Tirronen, Merrimack	G	—
Ian McCoshen, Boston College	D	Noah Hanifin, Boston College
Ben Hutton, Maine	D	Brandon Montour, Massachusetts
Matt Benning, Northeastern	D	—
Alex Tuch, Boston College	F	Alex Tuch, Boston College
Matt Willows, New Hampshire	F	Jack Eichel, Boston University
Tyler Kelleher, New Hampshire	F	C. J. Smith, Massachusetts–Lowell
Ross Mauermann, Providence	F	—

=== NCHC ===
Award		Recipient
Player of the Year		Joey LaLeggia, Denver
Rookie of the Year		Danton Heinen, Denver
Goaltender of the Year		Zane McIntyre, North Dakota
Forward of the Year		Trevor Moore, Denver
Defenseman of the Year		Joey LaLeggia, Denver
Offensive Defenseman of the Year		Joey LaLeggia, Denver
Defensive Forward of the Year		Mark MacMillan, North Dakota
Scholar-Athlete of the Year		Nick Mattson, North Dakota
Sportsmanship Award		Nick Oliver, St. Cloud State
Herb Brooks Coach of the Year		Dave Hakstol, North Dakota
Tournament MVP		Blake Coleman, Miami
All-NCHC Teams
First Team	Position	Second Team
Zane McIntyre, North Dakota	G	Ryan Massa, Omaha
Joey LaLeggia, Denver	D	Jordan Schmaltz, North Dakota
Jaccob Slavin, Colorado College	D	Andy Welinski, Minnesota–Duluth
Jonny Brodzinski, St. Cloud State	F	Drake Caggiula, North Dakota
Mark MacMillan, North Dakota	F	Austin Czarnik, Miami
Trevor Moore, Denver	F	Danton Heinen, Denver
Honorable Mention	Position	Rookie Team
Charlie Lindgren, St. Cloud State	G	Kasimir Kaskisuo, Minnesota–Duluth
Matthew Caito, Miami	D	Louie Belpedio, Miami
Andrew Prochno, St. Cloud State	D	Luc Snuggerud, Omaha
Jake Guentzel, Omaha	F	Danton Heinen, Denver
Austin Ortega, Omaha	F	Patrick Russell, St. Cloud State
Dominic Toninato, Minnesota–Duluth	F	Nick Schmaltz, North Dakota

=== WCHA ===
Award		Recipient
Player of the Year		Tanner Kero, Michigan Tech
Student-Athlete of the Year		Tanner Kero, Michigan Tech
Defensive Player of the Year		Colton Parayko, Alaska
Rookie of the Year		Michael Bitzer, Bemidji State
Scoring Champion		Tanner Kero, Michigan Tech
Goaltending Champion		Stephon Williams, Minnesota State
Coach of the Year		Mike Hastings, Minnesota State
Most Valuable Player in Tournament		Brad McClure, Minnesota State
All-WCHA Teams
First Team	Position	Second Team
Jamie Phillips, Michigan Tech	G	Stephon Williams, Minnesota State
Zach Palmquist, Minnesota State	D	Casey Nelson, Minnesota State
Colton Parayko, Alaska	D	Matt Prapavessis, Bemidji State
Tanner Kero, Michigan Tech	F	Bryce Gervais, Minnesota State
Matt Leitner, Minnesota State	F	Malcolm Gould, Michigan Tech
Tyler Morley, Alaska	F	Alex Petan, Michigan Tech
Third Team	Position	Rookie Team
C. J. Motte, Ferris State	G	Michael Bitzer, Bemidji State
Shane Hanna, Michigan Tech	D	Mark Friedman, Bowling Green
Brock Maschmeyer, Northern Michigan	D	Nolan Valleau, Bowling Green
Marcus Basara, Alaska	F	C.J. Franklin, Minnesota State
Brendan Harms, Bemidji State	F	Brandon Hawkins, Bowling Green
Blake Pietila, Michigan Tech	F	Max McHugh, Alabama–Huntsville
Blake Tatchell, Alaska Anchorage	F	–

=== Hobey Baker Award ===
Hobey Baker Award Finalists
Player	Position	School
Daniel Ciampini	Forward	Union
Jack Eichel	Forward	Boston University
Matt Garbowsky	Forward	RIT
Zach Hyman	Forward	Michigan
Tanner Kero	Forward	Michigan Tech
Joey LaLeggia	Defenceman	Denver
Zane McIntyre	Goaltender	North Dakota
Mike Reilly	Defenceman	Minnesota
Jimmy Vesey	Forward	Harvard
Cody Wydo	Forward	Robert Morris

=== Mike Richter Award ===
Mike Richter Award Finalists
Player	School
Kyle Hayton	St. Lawrence
Jake Hildebrand	Michigan State
Alex Lyon	Yale
Zane McIntyre	North Dakota
Jamie Phillips	Michigan Tech

=== Spencer Penrose Award ===
Spencer Penrose Award Finalists
Coach	School
Dean Blais	Omaha
Greg Carvel	St. Lawrence
Guy Gadowsky	Penn State
Dave Hakstol	North Dakota
Mike Hastings	Minnesota State
Nate Leaman	Providence
David Quinn	Boston University
Derek Schooley	Robert Morris

== 2015 NHL entry draft ==
Round	Pick	Player	College	Conference	NHL team
1	2	Jack Eichel	Boston University	Hockey East	Buffalo Sabres
1	5	Noah Hanifin	Boston College	Hockey East	Carolina Hurricanes
1	8	Zach Werenski	Michigan	Big Ten	Columbus Blue Jackets
1	17	Kyle Connor ^{†}	Michigan	Big Ten	Winnipeg Jets
1	21	Colin White ^{†}	Boston College	Hockey East	Ottawa Senators
1	23	Brock Boeser ^{†}	North Dakota	NCHC	Vancouver Canucks
1	25	Jack Roslovic ^{†}	Miami	NCHC	Winnipeg Jets
2	39	A. J. Greer	Boston University	Hockey East	Colorado Avalanche
2	45	Jakob Forsbacka Karlsson ^{†}	Boston University	Hockey East	Boston Bruins
2	50	Jordan Greenway ^{†}	Boston University	Hockey East	Minnesota Wild
3	78	Erik Foley ^{†}	Providence	Hockey East	Winnipeg Jets
3	80	Brent Gates ^{†}	Minnesota	Big Ten	Anaheim Ducks
3	81	Brendan Warren ^{†}	Michigan	Big Ten	Arizona Coyotes
3	85	Tommy Novak ^{†}	Minnesota	Big Ten	Nashville Predators
3	86	Mike Robinson ^{†}	New Hampshire	Hockey East	San Jose Sharks
3	90	Matej Tomek ^{†}	North Dakota	NCHC	Philadelphia Flyers
3	91	Dennis Gilbert ^{†}	Notre Dame	Hockey East	Chicago Blackhawks
4	92	Will Borgen ^{†}	St. Cloud State	NCHC	Buffalo Sabres
4	107	Christian Wolanin ^{†}	North Dakota	NCHC	Ottawa Senators
4	121	Ryan Shea ^{†}	Northeastern	Hockey East	Chicago Blackhawks
5	126	Luke Stevens ^{†}	Yale	ECAC Hockey	Carolina Hurricanes
5	130	Kārlis Čukste ^{†}	Quinnipiac	ECAC Hockey	San Jose Sharks
5	132	Karch Bachman ^{†}	Miami	NCHC	Florida Panthers
5	133	Joe Cecconi ^{†}	Michigan	Big Ten	Dallas Stars
5	140	Chase Pearson ^{†}	Maine	Hockey East	Detroit Red Wings
5	148	Troy Terry ^{†}	Denver	NCHC	Anaheim Ducks
5	149	Adam Gaudette ^{†}	Northeastern	Hockey East	Vancouver Canucks
5	150	Ryan Zuhlsdorf ^{†}	Minnesota	Big Ten	Tampa Bay Lightning
6	153	Kris Oldham ^{†}	Omaha	NCHC	Tampa Bay Lightning
6	156	Jake Massie ^{†}	Vermont	Hockey East	Carolina Hurricanes
6	157	Brett Seney	Merrimack	Hockey East	New Jersey Devils
6	158	Cooper Marody ^{†}	Michigan	Big Ten	Philadelphia Flyers
6	162	Chris Wilkie ^{†}	North Dakota	NCHC	Florida Panthers
6	165	Cameron Hughes	Wisconsin	Big Ten	Boston Bruins
6	167	Frederik Tiffels	Western Michigan	NCHC	Pittsburgh Penguins
6	168	Mason Appleton ^{†}	Michigan State	Big Ten	Winnipeg Jets
6	169	David Cotton ^{†}	Boston College	Hockey East	Carolina Hurricanes
6	170	Patrick Holway ^{†}	Maine	Hockey East	Detroit Red Wings
6	171	Nick Boka ^{†}	Michigan	Big Ten	Minnesota Wild
6	172	Andong Song ^{†}	Cornell	ECAC Hockey	New York Islanders
6	175	Tyler Moy	Harvard	ECAC Hockey	Nashville Predators
6	178	Steven Ruggiero ^{†}	Providence	Hockey East	Anaheim Ducks
6	179	Garrett Metcalf ^{†}	Massachusetts–Lowell	Hockey East	Anaheim Ducks
7	182	Ivan Chukarov ^{†}	Massachusetts	Hockey East	Buffalo Sabres
7	190	Marcus Vela ^{†}	New Hampshire	Hockey East	San Jose Sharks
7	192	Patrick Shea ^{†}	Maine	Hockey East	Florida Panthers
7	193	Jake Kupsky ^{†}	Union	ECAC Hockey	San Jose Sharks
7	194	Matt Roy	Michigan Tech	WCHA	Los Angeles Kings
7	195	Jack Becker ^{†}	Michigan	Big Ten	Boston Bruins
7	197	Nikita Pavlychev ^{†}	Penn State	Big Ten	Pittsburgh Penguins
7	199	Joey Daccord ^{†}	Arizona State	Independent	Ottawa Senators
7	204	Jack Sadek ^{†}	Minnesota	Big Ten	Minnesota Wild
7	206	Ryan Bednard ^{†}	Bowling Green	WCHA	Florida Panthers

† incoming freshman

== See also ==
- 2014–15 NCAA Division II men's ice hockey season
- 2014–15 NCAA Division III men's ice hockey season
