= 2013–14 USHL season =

2013–14 USHL Season
- League: United States Hockey League
- Sport: Ice hockey
- Duration: September 20, 2013 – April 5, 2014
- Games: 60
- Teams: 16

Draft
- Top draft pick: Aidan Muir
- Picked by: Indiana Ice

Regular season
- Anderson Cup: Waterloo Black Hawks
- Season MVP: Brandon Montour (Waterloo Black Hawks)
- Top scorer: Jake Randolph (Omaha Lancers)

Playoffs
- Playoffs MVP: Jason Pawloski (Ice)
- Finals champions: Indiana Ice
- Runners-up: Waterloo Black Hawks

USHL seasons
- 2012–13 2014–15

The 2013–14 USHL season is the 35th season of the United States Hockey League as an all-junior league. The regular season ran from September 20, 2013, to April 5, 2014. The regular season champion Waterloo Black Hawks were awarded the Anderson Cup. The playoff champion Indiana Ice captured the Clark Cup.

== Regular season ==
Note: GP = Games played; W = Wins; L = Losses; OTL = Overtime losses; PTS = Points; GF = Goals for; GA = Goals against; PIM = Penalties in minutes
x = clinched playoff berth; y = clinched conference title; z = clinched regular season title

=== Eastern Conference ===
Team	GP	W	L	OTL	PTS	GF	GA	PIM
y-Indiana Ice	60	42	11	7	91	233	141	856
x-Cedar Rapids RoughRiders	60	35	21	4	74	195	183	754
x-Dubuque Fighting Saints	60	33	23	4	70	201	186	957
x-Green Bay Gamblers	60	30	24	6	66	183	176	997
Muskegon Lumberjacks	60	30	25	5	65	190	212	1024
Team USA	60	30	25	5	65	246	233	1055
Chicago Steel	60	29	27	4	62	179	195	1025
Youngstown Phantoms	60	17	37	6	40	172	230	1212

=== Western Conference ===
Team	GP	W	L	OTL	PTS	GF	GA	PIM
z-Waterloo Black Hawks	60	44	11	5	93	240	153	687
x-Omaha Lancers	60	39	14	7	85	213	141	1016
x-Sioux City Musketeers	60	38	19	3	79	202	157	1169
x-Sioux Falls Stampede	60	34	19	7	75	197	175	1132
Lincoln Stars	60	24	28	8	56	175	219	1474
Des Moines Buccaneers	60	20	32	8	48	154	208	1326
Tri-City Storm	60	21	35	4	46	153	217	1062
Fargo Force	60	14	39	7	35	122	229	1275

== Players ==
=== Scoring leaders ===
Note: GP = Games played; G = Goals; A = Assists; PTS = Points; +/- = Plus/Minus Rating; PIM = Penalties in minutes

Player	Team	GP	G	A	PTS	PIM
Jake Randolph	Omaha Lancers	60	26	60	86	35
Kyle Connor	Youngstown Phantoms	56	31	43	74	12
Tyler Vesel	Omaha Lancers	49	33	38	71	22
Scott Conway	Indiana Ice	57	33	35	68	49
Peter Krieger	Waterloo Black Hawks	60	26	41	67	18
Andrew Poturalski	Cedar Rapids RoughRiders	60	27	37	64	28
Matt Iacopelli	Muskegon Lumberjacks	58	41	22	63	47
Nick Schmaltz	Green Bay Gamblers	55	18	45	63	16
Brandon Montour	Waterloo Black Hawks	60	14	48	62	36
Liam Pecararo	Waterloo Black Hawks	54	20	41	61	14

=== Leading goaltenders ===
Note: GP = Games played; MIN = Minutes played; W = Wins; L = Losses: OTL = Overtime losses; SO = Shutouts; GA = Goals Allowed; GAA = Goals against average; SV% = Save percentage

Player	Team	GP	MIN	W	L	OTL	SO	GA	GAA	SV%
Hayden Hawkey	Omaha Lancers	33	1901	22	6	3	3	63	1.99	0.926
Hayden Stewart	Dubuque/Indiana	27	1574	17	8	4	5	56	2.13	0.919
Cole Bruns	Omaha Lancers	30	1720	17	8	4	7	65	2.27	0.917
Collin Olson	Team USA	23	1231	14	4	1	2	47	2.29	0.921
Jason Pawloski	Indiana Ice	42	2443	25	8	4	5	100	2.46	0.904

== Post Season Awards ==
=== All-USHL First Team ===
Pos	Name	Team	Notes
G	Hayden Hawkey	Omaha	Goaltender of the Year; All Rookie Team
D	Brandon Montour	Waterloo	Player of the Year; Defenseman of the Year
D	Tucker Poolman	Omaha	
F	Kyle Connor	Youngstown	
F	Scott Conway	Indiana	
F	Matt Iacopelli	Muskegon	
F	Jake Randolph	Omaha	Forward of the Year

=== All-USHL Second Team ===
Pos	Name	Team
G	Cal Petersen	Waterloo
D	Mark Friedman	Waterloo
D	Alexx Privitera	Dubuque
F	Jack Eichel	Team USA
F	Peter Krieger	Waterloo
F	Tyler Vesel	Omaha

=== All Rookie Team ===
Pos	Name	Team
G	Hayden Hawkey	Omaha
D	Charlie Curti	Cedar Rapids
D	Hayden Shaw	Waterloo
D	Tim Shoup	Indiana
F	Robby Jackson	Chicago
F	Tyler Sheehy	Waterloo
F	Denis Smirnov	Indiana

== Clark Cup Playoffs ==
Conference Semi-Finals (Best of 5)
1	Indiana	3
4	Green Bay	1
Eastern Conference
3	Dubuque	3
2	Cedar Rapids	1
2	Omaha	1
3	Sioux City	3
Western Conference
4	Sioux Falls	0
1	Waterloo	3

Conference Finals (Best of 5)
1	Indiana	3
3	Dubuque	0
1	Waterloo	3
3	Sioux City	1

Clark Cup Championship (Best of 5)
E1	Indiana	3
W1	Waterloo	2

== Conference Semi-Finals ==
Note 1: All times are local.
Note 2: Game times in italics signify games to be played only if necessary.
Note 3: Home team is listed first.

=== Eastern Conference ===
==== (1) Indiana Ice vs. (4) Green Bay Gamblers ====
April 11	Indiana Ice	2 – 0	Green Bay Gamblers	Pan American Arena
No scoring		First period	No scoring
7:24 - Patrick Newell (1); 14:05 - Patrick Newell (2)		Second period	No scoring
No scoring		Third period	No scoring
Hayden Stewart (22 saves / 22 shots)		Goalie stats	Jared Rutledge (24 saves / 26 shots)

April 12	Indiana Ice	5 – 6	Green Bay Gamblers	Pan American Arena
No scoring		First period	Gavin Stoick (1) - 10:44; Connor Hurley (1) - pp - 19:49
1:32 - Patrick Newell (3)		Second period	Nick Schmaltz (1) - 6:39; Connor Hurley (2) - pp - 15:57
1:55 - pp - Matt Roy (1); 11:58 - Sam Kurker (1); 18:38 - pp - Aidan Muir (1); 19:08 - Matt Roy (2)		Third period	Matthew Weis (1) - pp - 16:14; Ryan Lough (1) - en - 17:48
Hayden Stewart (11 saves / 15 shots); Jason Pawloski (4 saves / 5 shots)		Goalie stats	Jared Rutledge (39 saves / 44 shots)

April 17	Green Bay Gamblers	0 – 1	Indiana Ice	Resch Center
No scoring		First period	No scoring
No scoring		Second period	Denis Smirnov (1) - 8:31
No scoring		Third period	No scoring
Jared Rutledge (31 saves / 32 shots)		Goalie stats	Jason Pawloski (12 saves / 12 shots)

April 18	Green Bay Gamblers	0 – 1	Indiana Ice	Resch Center
No scoring		First period	Mitch Hults (1) - pp - 13:19
No scoring		Second period	No scoring
No scoring		Third period	No scoring
Jared Rutledge (21 saves / 22 shots)		Goalie stats	Jason Pawloski (22 saves / 22 shots)

Indiana wins series 3 – 1

==== (2) Cedar Rapids RoughRiders vs. (3) Dubuque Fighting Saints ====
April 11	Cedar Rapids RoughRiders	1 – 2	Dubuque Fighting Saints	Cedar Rapids Ice Arena
7:18 - Dylan Steman (1)		First period	No scoring
No scoring		Second period	Phil Boje (1) - 3:06
No scoring		Third period	Karson Kuhlman (1) - 0:34
Danny Tirone (27 saves / 29 shots)		Goalie stats	Kevin Reich (17 saves / 18 shots)

April 12	Cedar Rapids RoughRiders	6 – 5	Dubuque Fighting Saints	Cedar Rapids Ice Arena
4:00 - Dylan McLaughlin (1); 11:28 - Andrew Oglevie (1); 18:41 - pp - Dylan Steman (2); 19:54 - pp - Dylan Steman (3)		First period	No scoring
0:33 - pp - Andrew Poturalski (1)		Second period	Alexx Privitera (1) - pp - 8:58; Rob Darrar (1) - pp - 9:14; Jarrid Privitera (1) - 9:58
19:07 - Corey Petrash (1)		Third period	Jacob Benson (1) - 0:12; Seamus Malone (1) - 9:51
Danny Tirone (30 saves / 35 shots)		Goalie stats	Kevin Reich (15 saves / 19 shots); Benjamin Johansson (16 saves / 18 shots)

April 18	Dubuque Fighting Saints	1 – 0	Cedar Rapids RoughRiders	Mystique Ice Center
No scoring		First period	No scoring
11:11 - Rob Darrar (2)		Second period	No scoring
No scoring		Third period	No scoring
Kevin Reich (27 saves / 27 shots)		Goalie stats	Danny Tirone (32 saves / 33 shots)

April 19	Dubuque Fighting Saints	7 – 3	Cedar Rapids RoughRiders	Mystique Ice Center
9:05 - Josh Elmes (1)		First period	No scoring
11:48 - Josh Elmes (2); 15:48 - Jason Ford (1)		Second period	Andrew Oglevie (2) - ps - 5:30
5:20 - Rob Darrar (3); 16:03 - Jarrid Privitera (2); 18:33 - en - Rob Darrar (4)		Third period	Frederik Tiffels (1) - pp - 12:43; Andrew Poturalski (2) - 16:37
Kevin Reich (26 saves / 29 shots)		Goalie stats	Danny Tirone (28 saves / 34 shots)

Dubuque wins series 3 – 1

=== Western Conference ===
==== (1) Waterloo Black Hawks vs. (4) Sioux Falls Stampede ====
April 11	Waterloo Black Hawks	7 – 4	Sioux Falls Stampede	Young Arena
4:49 - Brandon Montour (1); 9:57 - pp - Blake Winiecki (1)		First period	Zeb Knutson (1) - 15:10
6:39 - Drew Melanson (1); 8:10 - Blake Winiecki (2)		Second period	Christian Horn (1) - pp - 3:30; Louis Nanne (1) - 8:32
0:19 - pp - Brandon Montour (2); 6:45 - Liam Pecararo (1); 17:16 - Brandon Montour (3)		Third period	Nolan Gluchowski (1) - 10:57
Cal Petersen (25 saves / 29 shots)		Goalie stats	David Jacobson (40 saves / 47 shots)

April 12	Waterloo Black Hawks	6 – 3	Sioux Falls Stampede	Young Arena
16:01 - Drew Melanson (2)		First period	Tony Calderone (1) - 14:20
4:18 - Blake Winiecki (3); 19:59 - Patrick Russell (1)		Second period	C.J. Franklin (1) - pp - 3:45
3:01 - Jake Horton (1); 6:31 - pp - Zach Sanford (1); 18:22 - en - Tyler Sheehy (1)		Third period	R.J. Majkozak (1) - 7:29
Cal Petersen (25 saves / 28 shots)		Goalie stats	Artt Brey (35 saves / 40 shots)

April 17	Sioux Falls Stampede	2 – 7	Waterloo Black Hawks	Sioux Falls Arena
17:23 - Zeb Knutson (2)		First period	Hayden Shaw (1) - 1:49; Tyler Sheehy (2) - pp - 4:24; Peter Krieger (1) - pp - 15:05; Brandon Montour (4) - pp - 15:45
No scoring		Second period	Blake Winiecki (4) - pp - 11:51
0:14 - C.J. Franklin (2)		Third period	Tim Lappin (1) - 4:56; Tim Lappin (2) - 18:08
Artt Brey (10 saves / 14 shots); David Jacobson (32 saves / 35 shots)		Goalie stats	Cal Petersen (23 saves / 25 shots)

Waterloo wins series 3 – 0

==== (2) Omaha Lancers vs. (3) Sioux City Musketeers ====
April 12	Omaha Lancers	3 – 4	OT	Sioux City Musketeers	Ralston Arena
4:23 - pp - Jimmy Schuldt (1)		First period		Brock Boeser (1) - 0:47
No scoring		Second period		Brandon Hawkins (1) - 8:45; Avery Peterson (1) - 13:07
11:53 - Jake Randolph (1); 16:21 - Brendan Smith (1)		Third period		No scoring
No scoring		First overtime period		Avery Peterson (2) - 1:49
Hayden Hawkey (25 saves / 29 shots)		Goalie stats		Kyle Hayton (40 saves / 43 shots)

April 13	Omaha Lancers	1 – 2	Sioux City Musketeers	Ralston Arena
No scoring		First period	Jared Thomas (1) - 11:20
18:53 - Tyler Vesel (1)		Second period	No scoring
No scoring		Third period	Brandon Hawkins (2) - 9:29
Hayden Hawkey (23 saves / 25 shots)		Goalie stats	Kyle Hayton (33 saves / 34 shots)

April 18	Sioux City Musketeers	3 – 4	OT	Omaha Lancers	Tyson Events Center
No scoring		First period		No scoring
1:46 - Trevor Olson (1)		Second period		Tyler Vesel (2) - pp - 11:03; Tucker Poolman (1) - 15:36
14:39 - Adam Johnson (1); 16:24 - pp - Avery Peterson (3)		Third period		Tyler Vesel (3) - 14:14
No scoring		First overtime period		Jake Randolph (2) - 16:46
Kyle Hayton (30 saves / 34 shots)		Goalie stats		Hayden Hawkey (25 saves / 28 shots)

April 19	Sioux City Musketeers	4 – 2	Omaha Lancers	Tyson Events Center
No scoring		First period	Luca Frigo (1) - 19:59
No scoring		Second period	No scoring
2:37 - Adam Johnson (2); 8:55 - Brandon Hawkins (3); 17:56 - Jake Montgomery (1); 19:48 - en - Jake Montgomery (2)		Third period	Gage Hough (1) - 3:56
Kyle Hayton (35 saves / 37 shots)		Goalie stats	Hayden Hawkey (28 saves / 31 shots)

Sioux City wins series 3 – 1

== Conference Finals ==
=== Eastern Conference ===
==== (1) Indiana Ice vs. (3) Dubuque Fighting Saints ====
April 25	Indiana Ice	4 – 1	Dubuque Fighting Saints	Pan American Arena
14:54 - pp - Jacob Pritchard (1)		First period	Rob Darrar (5) - 1:49
18:25 - pp - Scott Conway (1)		Second period	No scoring
5:08 - Brian Pinho (1); 15:07 - Denis Smirnov (2)		Third period	No scoring
Jason Pawloski (22 saves / 23 shots)		Goalie stats	Kevin Reich (24 saves / 28 shots)

April 26	Indiana Ice	3 – 2	Dubuque Fighting Saints	Pan American Arena
8:06 - Sam Kurker (2); 11:37 - Denis Smirnov (3)		First period	No scoring
No scoring		Second period	Jacob Benson (2) - pp - 18:48
1:25 - Sam Kurker (3)		Third period	Jacob Benson (3) - 17:39
Jason Pawloski (26 saves / 28 shots)		Goalie stats	Kevin Reich (29 saves / 32 shots)

May 2	Dubuque Fighting Saints	2 – 3	Indiana Ice	Mystique Ice Center
4:17 - pp - Seamus Malone (3)		First period	No scoring
No scoring		Second period	Scott Conway (2) - 11:02; Alex Talcott (1) - 13:41
18:42 - Jacob Benson (4)		Third period	Joe Sullivan (1) - 5:17
Kevin Reich (11 saves / 14 shots)		Goalie stats	Jason Pawloski (22 saves / 24 shots)

Indiana wins series 3 – 0

=== Western Conference ===
==== (1) Waterloo Black Hawks vs. (3) Sioux City Musketeers ====
April 25	Waterloo Black Hawks	3 – 2	Sioux City Musketeers	Young Arena
15:23 - Drew Melanson (3)		First period	Avery Peterson (4) - 4:52
15:41 - Tyler Sheehy (3)		Second period	No scoring
9:55 - pp - Patrick Russell (2)		Third period	Trevor Olson (2) - 10:35
Cal Petersen (31 saves / 33 shots)		Goalie stats	Kyle Hayton (33 saves / 36 shots)

April 26	Waterloo Black Hawks	3 – 1	Sioux City Musketeers	Young Arena
No scoring		First period	Bobby Nardella (1) - 11:46
19:02 - pp - Drew Melanson (4); 19:32 - pp - Tyler Sheehy (4)		Second period	No scoring
8:34 - pp - Liam Pecararo (2)		Third period	No scoring
Cal Petersen (25 saves / 26 shots)		Goalie stats	Kyle Hayton (38 saves / 41 shots)

May 2	Sioux City Musketeers	4 – 3	OT	Waterloo Black Hawks	Tyson Events Center
No scoring		First period		No scoring
4:53 - Adam Johnson (3); 6:58 - Adam Johnson (4)		Second period		Dane Cooper (1) - 6:36; Liam Pecararo (3) - 7:48
12:43 - Avery Peterson (5)		Third period		Brandon Montour (5) - 19:56
16:50 - Joel L'Esperance (1)		First overtime period		No scoring
Collin Olson (32 saves / 35 shots)		Goalie stats		Cal Petersen (35 saves / 39 shots)

May 4	Sioux City Musketeers	1 – 5	Waterloo Black Hawks	Tyson Events Center
No scoring		First period	No scoring
No scoring		Second period	Drew Melanson (5) - 15:01; Peter Krieger (2) - 15:45
6:43 - Brandon Hawkins (4)		Third period	Blake Winiecki (5) - pp - 8:25; Tyler Sheehy (5) - 16:29; Zach Sanford (2) - en - 16:50
Collin Olson (34 saves / 38 shots)		Goalie stats	Cal Petersen (37 saves / 38 shots)

Waterloo wins series 3 – 1

== Clark Cup Finals ==
=== (W1) Waterloo Black Hawks vs. (E1) Indiana Ice ===
May 9	Waterloo Black Hawks	4 – 2	Indiana Ice	Young Arena
No scoring		First period	Scott Conway (3) - 2:31
6:31 - Hayden Shaw (2); 10:19 - Tyler Sheehy (6)		Second period	Josh Jacobs (1) - 5:09
13:49 - Blake Winiecki (6); 19:48 - en - Jake Horton (2)		Third period	No scoring
Cal Petersen (32 saves / 34 shots)		Goalie stats	Jason Pawloski (31 saves / 34 shots)

May 10	Waterloo Black Hawks	2 – 3	2OT	Indiana Ice	Young Arena
No scoring		First period		Josh Jacobs (2) - pp - 9:15
12:37 - pp - Tyler Sheehy (7)		Second period		No scoring
0:39 - sh - John Wiitala (1)		Third period		Mitch Hults (2) - pp - 1:38
No scoring		Second overtime period		Joe Sullivan (2) - 6:49
Cal Petersen (59 saves / 62 shots)		Goalie stats		Jason Pawloski (32 saves / 34 shots)

May 16	Indiana Ice	4 – 1	Waterloo Black Hawks	Pan American Arena
12:45 - Tyler Pham (1); 18:14 - Patrick Newell (4)		First period	No scoring
18:12 - pp - Mitch Hults (3)		Second period	Patrick Russell (3) - 19:45
18:17 - en - Scott Conway (4)		Third period	No scoring
Jason Pawloski (27 saves / 28 shots)		Goalie stats	Cal Petersen (20 saves / 23 shots)

May 17	Indiana Ice	2 – 7	Waterloo Black Hawks	Pan American Arena
2:14 - Josh Jacobs (3); 9:47 - pp - Mitch Hults (4)		First period	Tyler Sheehy (8) - 7:28
No scoring		Second period	Zach Sanford (3) - 3:10; Zach Sanford (4) - pp - 8:25
No scoring		Third period	Tim Lappin (3) - 6:39; Brandon Montour (6) - 9:27; Liam Pecararo (4) - 12:07; Patrick Russell (4) - en - 18:17
Jason Pawloski (15 saves / 20 shots); Hayden Stewart (6 saves / 7 shots)		Goalie stats	Cal Petersen (36 saves / 38 shots)

May 20	Waterloo Black Hawks	2 – 3	Indiana Ice	Young Arena
3:40 - Patrick Russell (5)		First period	Mitch Hults (5) - 11:21
11:35 - Zach Sanford (5)		Second period	No scoring
No scoring		Third period	Alex Talcott (2) - 11:12; Brian Pinho (2) - 17:45
Cal Petersen (41 saves / 44 shots)		Goalie stats	Jason Pawloski (33 saves / 35 shots)

Indiana wins series 3 – 2

== Playoff Statistics ==
Statistics reflect games played through May 20, 2014

=== Scoring leaders ===
Note: GP = Games played; G = Goals; A = Assists; PTS = Points; PIM = Penalty minutes

Player	Team	GP	G	A	PTS	PIM
Brandon Montour	Waterloo Black Hawks	12	6	10	16	10
Tyler Sheehy	Waterloo Black Hawks	12	8	7	15	0
Blake Winiecki	Waterloo Black Hawks	12	6	8	14	2
Liam Pecararo	Waterloo Black Hawks	12	4	10	14	0
Zach Sanford	Waterloo Black Hawks	12	5	7	12	8
Drew Melanson	Waterloo Black Hawks	12	5	6	11	8
Scott Conway	Indiana Ice	12	4	7	11	14
Peter Krieger	Waterloo Black Hawks	12	2	9	11	14
Avery Peterson	Sioux City Musketeers	8	5	4	9	4
Seamus Malone	Dubuque Fighting Saints	7	3	6	9	4

=== Leading goaltenders ===
Note: GP = Games played; MIN = Minutes played; W = Wins; L = Losses; SO = Shutouts; GA = Goals Allowed; GAA = Goals against average; SV% = Save percentage

Player	Team	GP	MIN	W	L	SO	GA	GAA	SV%
Jason Pawloski	Indiana Ice	11	633	8	3	2	19	1.80	0.928
Jared Rutledge	Green Bay Gamblers	4	237	1	3	0	9	2.28	0.927
Cal Petersen	Waterloo Black Hawks	12	760	8	4	0	30	2.37	0.928
Kyle Hayton	Sioux City Musketeers	6	377	3	3	0	16	2.55	0.929
Hayden Stewart	Indiana Ice	3	108	1	0	1	5	2.77	0.886
