= 2014–15 Vermont Catamounts men's ice hockey season =

- Conference: Hockey East
- Home ice: Gutterson Fieldhouse

Rankings
- USCHO.com: #19

Record
- Overall: 22–15–4 (10–9–3 HEA)
- Home: 11–6–2
- Road: 11–7–2
- Neutral: 0–2–0

Coaches and captains
- Head coach: Kevin Sneddon
- Assistant coaches: Kevin Patrick; Kyle Wallack

The 2014–15 Vermont Catamounts men's ice hockey team represented the University of Vermont in the 2014–15 NCAA Division I men's ice hockey season. The team was coached by Kevin Sneddon, in his 12th season at Vermont. The Catamounts played their home games at the Gutterson Fieldhouse on campus in Burlington, Vermont. They competed in Hockey East.

== Personnel ==
=== Roster ===
As of November 13, 2014.

No.	Nat.	Player	Class	Pos	Height	Weight	DoB	Hometown	Previous team	NHL rights
1		Michael Santaguida	Sophomore	G	5' 9" (1.75 m)	175 lb (79 kg)	1993-03-06	Mississauga, Ontario	Surrey (BCHL)	—
2		Michael Paliotta	Senior	D	6' 4" (1.93 m)	205 lb (93 kg)	1993-04-16	Westport, Connecticut	US NTDP (USHL)	CHI, 70th overall 2011
4		Trey Phillips	Freshman	D	5' 10" (1.78 m)	174 lb (79 kg)	1993-04-02	Okotoks, Alberta	Canmore (AJHL)	—
5		Robert Hamilton	Sophomore	D	6' 0" (1.83 m)	185 lb (84 kg)	1994-01-01	Calgary, Alberta	Okotoks (AJHL)	—
6		Colin Markison	Senior	F	5' 10" (1.78 m)	185 lb (84 kg)	1992-08-06	Princeton, New Jersey	Omaha (USHL)	—
7		Thomas Forgione	Sophomore	F	5' 10" (1.78 m)	185 lb (84 kg)	1993-08-23	South Burlington, Vermont	Sioux Falls (USHL)	—
8		Jonathan Turk	Junior	F	5' 9" (1.75 m)	188 lb (85 kg)	1991-05-01	Calgary, Alberta	Okotoks (AJHL)	—
9		Kyle Reynolds	Senior	F	5' 10" (1.78 m)	170 lb (77 kg)	1990-01-04	Sylvan Lake, Alberta	Okotoks (AJHL)	—
10		Travis Blanleil	Freshman	F	5' 7" (1.7 m)	152 lb (69 kg)	1994-03-08	Kelowna, British Columbia	Penticton (BCHL)	—
12		Michael Stenerson	Sophomore	F	5' 10" (1.78 m)	185 lb (84 kg)	1993-01-20	Surrey, British Columbia	Surrey (BCHL)	—
13		Daniel Senkbeil	Junior	D	6' 4" (1.93 m)	218 lb (99 kg)	1991-09-07	Fremont, California	North Dakota (NCHC)	—
14		Kevin Irwin	Freshman	F	6' 0" (1.83 m)	174 lb (79 kg)	1993-07-09	Akron, Ohio	Green Bay (USHL)	—
15		Yvan Pattyn	Junior	D	6' 1" (1.85 m)	196 lb (89 kg)	1993-03-31	Ste. Anne, Manitoba	Portage (MJHL)	—
16		Mitch Ferguson	Freshman	D	6' 0" (1.83 m)	170 lb (77 kg)	1994-03-29	Calgary, Alberta	Salmon Arm (BCHL)	—
17		Jacob Fallon	Senior	F	5' 10" (1.78 m)	187 lb (85 kg)	1992-02-27	Southlake, Texas	Indiana (USHL)	—
18		Alexx Privitera	Junior	D	5' 11" (1.8 m)	194 lb (88 kg)	1993-01-18	Old Tappan, New Jersey	Dubuque (USHL)	—
19		Jarrid Privitera	Freshman	F	5' 7" (1.7 m)	161 lb (73 kg)	1994-07-01	Old Tappan, New Jersey	Dubuque (USHL)	—
20		Brendan Bradley	Sophomore	F	6' 0" (1.83 m)	170 lb (77 kg)	1992-08-15	Warminster, Pennsylvania	New Jersey (EJHL)	—
21		Mario Puskarich	Sophomore	F	5' 9" (1.75 m)	190 lb (86 kg)	1992-06-22	Fort Walton Beach, Florida	Langley (BCHL)	—
22		Brady Shaw	Sophomore	F	6' 1" (1.85 m)	200 lb (91 kg)	1992-10-02	Ottawa, Ontario	Surrey (BCHL)	—
23		Robert Darrar	Freshman	F	5' 9" (1.75 m)	176 lb (80 kg)	1994-07-30	Monroe Township, New Jersey	Dubuque (USHL)	—
24		Chris Muscoby	Sophomore	D	5' 9" (1.75 m)	183 lb (83 kg)	1992-02-28	Airdrie, Alberta	Brooks (AJHL)	—
25		Nicholas Luukko	Senior	D	6' 3" (1.91 m)	210 lb (95 kg)	1991-11-29	West Chester, Pennsylvania	Dubuque (USHL)	PHI, 179th overall 2010
28		Anthony Petruzzelli	Freshman	F	5' 10" (1.78 m)	179 lb (81 kg)	1993-05-09	Federal Way, Washington	Brooks (AJHL)	—
29		Malcolm McKinney	Sophomore	F	5' 8" (1.73 m)	164 lb (74 kg)	1992-09-27	West Vancouver, British Columbia	Coquitlam (BCHL)	—
30		Patrick Feeley	Sophomore	G	6' 7" (2.01 m)	226 lb (103 kg)	1993-02-22	Winthrop, Massachusetts	New Hampshire (EJHL)	—
37		Brody Hoffman	Junior	G	6' 4" (1.93 m)	195 lb (88 kg)	1991-02-18	Wilkie, Saskatchewan	Fort McMurray (AJHL)	—

=== Coaching staff ===
Name	Position	Seasons at Vermont	Alma mater
Kevin Sneddon	Head coach	12	Harvard University (1992)
Kevin Patrick	Assistant coach	3	University of Notre Dame (1992)
Kyle Wallack	Assistant coach	3	Springfield College (1997)

== Standings ==
2014–15 Hockey East men's standings
	Conference record							Overall record					
	GP	W	L	T	PTS	GF	GA	GP	W	L	T	GF	GA
#2 Boston University †*	22	14	5	3	31	88	55	41	28	8	5	158	95
#1 Providence	22	13	8	1	27	61	37	41	26	13	2	123	84
#13 Boston College	22	12	7	3	27	60	50	38	21	14	3	107	91
#17 Massachusetts–Lowell	22	11	7	4	26	70	52	39	21	12	6	134	101
Notre Dame	22	10	7	5	25	64	54	42	18	19	5	126	116
Northeastern	22	11	9	2	24	70	69	36	16	16	4	107	107
Vermont	22	10	9	3	23	62	53	41	22	15	4	110	91
New Hampshire	22	10	11	1	21	66	68	40	19	19	2	119	109
Connecticut	22	7	11	4	18	42	74	36	10	19	7	66	111
Maine	22	8	12	2	18	64	74	39	14	22	3	108	127
Merrimack	22	5	14	3	13	38	56	38	16	18	4	81	93
Massachusetts	22	5	16	1	11	59	102	36	11	23	2	99	152
Championship: March 21, 2015 † indicates conference regular season champion; * indicates conference tournament champion Rankings: USCHO.com Top 20 Poll; updated March 9, 2015

== Schedule ==
Date	Time	Opponent^{#}	Rank^{#}	Site	TV	Result	Attendance	Record
Exhibition
October 5	4:00 PM	Royal Military		Gutterson Fieldhouse • Burlington, Vermont		W 8–0	3,160	0–0–0
Regular Season
October 11	7:00 PM	at #16 Northeastern		Matthews Arena • Boston, Massachusetts		W 6–2	3,298	1–0–0 (1–0–0)
October 17	7:05 PM	Clarkson*		Gutterson Fieldhouse • Burlington, Vermont		W 2–1	4,007	2–0–0
October 18	7:00 PM	at Clarkson*		Cheel Arena • Potsdam, New York		W 3–0	2,650	3–0–0
October 25	7:05 PM	Connecticut	#17	Gutterson Fieldhouse • Burlington, Vermont		W 2–1	4,007	4–0–0 (2–0–0)
October 31	8:05 PM	at #20 Notre Dame	#13	Compton Family Ice Arena • Notre Dame, Indiana	NBCSN	L 2–3	3,609	4–1–0 (2–1–0)
November 1	7:05 PM	at #20 Notre Dame	#13	Compton Family Ice Arena • Notre Dame, Indiana		T 2–2 ^{OT}	3,947	4–1–1 (2–1–1)
November 7	7:05 PM	Maine	#14	Gutterson Fieldhouse • Burlington, Vermont		W 4–3 ^{OT}	4,007	5–1–1 (3–1–1)
November 8	7:05 PM	Maine	#14	Gutterson Fieldhouse • Burlington, Vermont		W 4–1	4,007	6–1–1 (4–1–1)
November 14	7:00 PM	at #16 Providence	#10	Schneider Arena • Providence, Rhode Island		L 0–3	2,358	6–2–1 (4–2–1)
November 15	7:00 PM	at #16 Providence	#10	Schneider Arena • Providence, Rhode Island		W 2–1	2,230	7–2–1 (5–2–1)
November 21	5:30 PM	at Connecticut	#11	XL Center • Hartford, Connecticut		L 1–2	5,072	7–3–1 (5–3–1)
November 22	7:00 PM	at UMass	#11	Mullins Center • Amherst, Massachusetts		W 11–1	3,027	8–3–1 (6–3–1)
November 25	7:05 PM	UMass	#13	Gutterson Fieldhouse • Burlington, Vermont	NESN	W 3–1	4,007	9–3–1 (7–3–1)
November 28	7:00 PM	at Maine*	#13	Alfond Arena • Orono, Maine		W 6–3	3,707	10–3–1
November 29	7:00 PM	at Maine*	#13	Alfond Arena • Orono, Maine		W 4–1	4,148	11–3–1
December 12	7:05 PM	St. Lawrence*	#10	Gutterson Fieldhouse • Burlington, Vermont		W 2–1	4,007	12–3–1
December 13	7:00 PM	at St. Lawrence*	#10	Appleton Arena • Canton, New York		W 2–0	1,276	13–3–1
December 28	7:05 PM	Air Force*	#10	Gutterson Fieldhouse • Burlington, Vermont (Catamount Cup)		W 4–2	4,007	14–3–1
December 29	7:05 PM	Providence*	#10	Gutterson Fieldhouse • Burlington, Vermont (Catamount Cup)		L 0–3	4,007	14–4–1
January 3	7:30 PM	at Yale*	#10	Ingalls Rink • New Haven, Connecticut		L 1–3	3,500	14–5–1
January 11	4:00 PM	at Dartmouth*	#12	Thompson Arena • Hanover, New Hampshire		W 4–1	3,671	15–5–1
January 16	7:05 PM	Northeastern	#10	Gutterson Fieldhouse • Burlington, Vermont		L 1–4	4,007	15–6–1 (7–4–1)
January 17	7:05 PM	Northeastern*	#10	Gutterson Fieldhouse • Burlington, Vermont		T 2–2	4,007	15–6–2
January 23	7:05 PM	#3 Boston University	#12	Gutterson Fieldhouse • Burlington, Vermont		L 2–4	4,007	15–7–2 (7–5–1)
January 24	7:05 PM	#3 Boston University	#12	Gutterson Fieldhouse • Burlington, Vermont		L 1–2	4,007	15–8–2 (7–6–1)
January 31	1:00 PM	vs. Penn State*	#15	Wells Fargo Center • Philadelphia, Pennsylvania		L 2–4	11,674	15–9–2
February 6	7:05 PM	New Hampshire	#17	Gutterson Fieldhouse • Burlington, Vermont		W 5–2	3,810	16–9–2 (8–6–1)
February 7	7:05 PM	New Hampshire	#17	Gutterson Fieldhouse • Burlington, Vermont		L 3–6	4,007	16–10–2 (8–7–1)
February 13	7:30 PM	at #10 Boston College	#17	Kelley Rink • Chestnut Hill, Massachusetts		W 3–2 ^{OT}	4,528	17–10–2 (9–7–1)
February 14	7:00 PM	at #10 Boston College	#17	Kelley Rink • Chestnut Hill, Massachusetts		L 5–6	3,119	17–11–2 (9–8–1)
February 20	7:05 PM	Merrimack	#18	Gutterson Fieldhouse • Burlington, Vermont		W 2–1	3,867	18–11–2 (10–8–1)
February 21	7:05 PM	Merrimack	#18	Gutterson Fieldhouse • Burlington, Vermont		T 0–0 ^{OT}	4,007	18–11–3 (10–8–2)
February 27	7:00 PM	at #14 UMass Lowell	#18	Tsongas Center • Lowell, Massachusetts		L 1–4	5,514	18–12–3 (10–9–2)
February 28	7:00 PM	at #14 UMass Lowell	#18	Tsongas Center • Lowell, Massachusetts		T 2–2 ^{OT}	6,261	18–12–4 (10–9–3)
Postseason
March 6	7:00 PM	Maine*	#17	Gutterson Fieldhouse • Burlington, Vermont (Hockey East First Round)		W 4–2	2,482	19–12–4
March 7	7:00 PM	Maine*	#17	Gutterson Fieldhouse • Burlington, Vermont (Hockey East First Round)		L 2–4	2,886	19–13–4
March 7	7:00 PM	Maine*	#17	Gutterson Fieldhouse • Burlington, Vermont (Hockey East First Round)		W 3–2 ^{OT}	2,622	20–13–4
March 13	7:00 PM	at #9 Boston College*	#17	Kelley Rink • Chestnut Hill, Massachusetts (Hockey East Quarterfinal)		L 2–4	3,478	20–14–4
March 14	7:00 PM	at #9 Boston College*	#17	Kelley Rink • Chestnut Hill, Massachusetts (Hockey East Quarterfinal)		W 3–1	3,349	21–14–4
March 15	6:00 PM	at #9 Boston College*	#17	Kelley Rink • Chestnut Hill, Massachusetts (Hockey East Quarterfinal)		W 1–0	2,242	22–14–4
March 20	5:00 PM	vs. #12 UMass Lowell*	#16	TD Garden • Boston, Massachusetts (Hockey East Semifinal)		L 1–4	13,263	22–15–4
*Non-conference game. ^{#}Rankings from USCHO.com Poll. All times are in Eastern Time.

== Rankings ==
Poll	Week																							
Poll	Pre	1	2	3	4	5	6	7	8	9	10	11	12	13	14	15	16	17	18	19	20	21	22	23 (Final)
USCHO.com	RV	RV	17	13	14	10	11	13	11	10	10	12	10	12	15	17	17	18	18	17	17	16	19	
USA Today	NR	RV	RV	14	15	10	10	12	10	10	9	11	9	12	14	RV	RV	RV	RV	NR	RV	RV	NR	
