= 1992 All-Big East Conference football team =

American college football all-star team

The 1992 All-Big East Conference football team consists of American football players chosen as All-Big East Conference players for the 1992 NCAA Division I-A football season. The organizations selecting All-Big East teams in 1992 included the Football News (FN) and the conference coaches.

The 1992 Miami Hurricanes football team led the conference with an 11–0 regular-season record. Coach Dennis Erickson was selected as the Big East Coach of the Year. Quarterback Gino Toretta was selected as the offensive player of the year, and linebacker Michael Barrow was selected as the defensive player of the year. A total of eight Miami players received first-team honors, including offensive tackle Mario Cristobal (later Miami's head coach) and wide receiver Lamar Thomas (later head coach of the Tampa Bay Buccaneers and Miami Dolphins).

Five players from Syracuse and Boston College, and four from West Virginia, also received first-team honors.

== Offensive selections ==
=== Quarterbacks ===
- Gino Toretta, Miami (FL) - FN-1, Coaches-1
- Marvin Graves, Syracuse - Coaches-2

=== Running backs ===
- Chuckie Dukes, Boston College - FN-1, Coaches-1
- Adrian Murrell, West Virginia - Coaches-1
- Craig Mitter, Rutgers - Coaches-2
- David Walker, Syracuse - Coaches-2

=== Receivers ===
- Lamar Thomas, Miami (FL) - FN-1, Coaches-1
- Dietrich Jells, Pitt - FN-1
- James Guarantano, Rutgers - Coaches-1
- Shelby Hill, Syracuse - Coaches-2
- Qadry Ismail, Syracuse - Coaches-2

=== Tight ends ===
- Chris Gedney, Syracuse - FN-1, Coaches-1
- Coleman Bell, Miami (FL) - Coaches-2

=== Offensive line ===
- Mike Compton, West Virginia - FN-1, Coaches-1 [center]
- Tre Johnson, Temple - FN-1, Coaches-2
- Terrence Wisdom, Syracuse - FN-1, Coaches-1 [guard]
- Reuben Brown, Pitt - FN-1, Coaches-2
- Jim Pyne, Virginia Tech - FN-1, Coaches-2 [center]
- Lorenzo Styles, West Virginia - Coaches-1 [guard]
- Mario Cristobal, Miami (FL) - Coaches-1 [tackle]
- Dan Britten, Boston College - Coaches-1 [tackle]
- Kipp Vickers, Miami (FL) - Coaches-2
- Chris Sestill, Pitt - Coaches-2

== Defensive selections ==
=== Defensive line ===
- Kevin Mitchell, Syracuse - FN-1, Coaches-1
- Kevin Patrick, Miami (FL) - FN-1, Coaches-1
- John Stolberg, Boston College - FN-1, Coaches-1
- Mark Caesar, Miami (FL) - Coaches-1
- Tom Briggs, West Virginia - Coaches-2
- Lance Johnstone, Temple - Coaches-2
- Darren Krein, Miami (FL) - Coaches-2
- Mike Marinaro, Boston College - Coaches-2

=== Linebackers ===
- Michael Barrow, Miami (FL) - FN-1, Coaches-1
- Darrin Smith, Miami (FL) - FN-1, Coaches-1
- Tom McManus, Boston College - FN-1, Coaches-1
- Glen Young, Syracuse - FN-1, Coaches-2
- Jesse Armstead, Miami (FL) - Coaches-2
- Shawn Williams, Rutgers - Coaches-2

=== Defensive backs ===
- Ryan McNeil, Miami (FL) - FN-1, Coaches-1 [cornerback]
- Tyrone Drakeford, Virginia Tech - FN-1, Coaches-1 [cornerback]
- Jay Bellamy, Rutgers - FN-1
- Charlie Brennan, Boston College - FN-1, FN-1 [safety]
- Dwayne Joseph, Syracuse - Coaches-2 [cornerback]
- Vernon Lewis, Pitt - Coaches-2 [cornerback]
- Jay Bellamy, Rutgers - Coaches-2 [safety]
- Casey Greer, Miami (FL) - Coaches-2 [safety]
- Bob Grosvenor, Syracuse - Coaches-2 [safety]

== Special teams ==
=== Kickers ===
- John Bishop, Syracuse - FN-1, Coaches-1
- Mike Vanderjagt, West Virginia - Coaches-2

=== Punters ===
- Todd Sauerbrun, West Virginia - FN-1, Coaches-1
- Pat O'Neill, Syracuse - Coaches-2

=== Return specialist ===
- Law Lawhorn, Temple - Coaches-1
- Kevin Williams, Miami (FL) - Coaches-2

== Individual honors ==
- Offensive player - Gino Toretta, Miami (FL) - Coaches
- Defensive player - Michael Barrow, Miami (FL) - Coaches
- Special teams player - John Biskup, Syracuse - Coaches
- Rookie - Bruce Presley, Rutgers - Coaches
- Coach - Dennis Erickson, Miami (FL) - Coaches

== Key ==
FN = Football News

Coaches, selected by the Big East coaches

== See also ==
- 1992 All-America college football team
