= 2014–15 Northeastern Huskies men's ice hockey season =

- Conference: Hockey East
- Home ice: Matthews Arena

Record
- Overall: 16–16–4 (11–9–2 HEA)
- Home: 8–7–2
- Road: 7–8–2
- Neutral: 1–1–0

Coaches and captains
- Head coach: Jim Madigan
- Assistant coaches: Jerry Keefe; Jason Smith

The 2014–15 Northeastern Huskies men's ice hockey team represented Northeastern University during the 2014–15 NCAA Division I men's ice hockey season. The team was coached by Jim Madigan, in his 4th season with the Huskies. The Huskies played their home games at Matthews Arena on campus in Boston, Massachusetts, competing in Hockey East.

== Previous season ==
In 2013–14, the Huskies finished 5th in Hockey East with a record of 19–14–4, 10–8–2 in conference play. In the 2014 Hockey East Men's Ice Hockey Tournament, they lost in the quarterfinals to New Hampshire, two games to one. They failed to qualify for the 2014 NCAA Division I Men's Ice Hockey Tournament.

== Personnel ==
=== Roster ===
As of January 7, 2015.

| No. | Nat. | Player | Class | Pos | Height | Weight | DoB | Hometown | Previous team | NHL rights |
|---|---|---|---|---|---|---|---|---|---|---|
| 1 | | Derick Roy | Sophomore (RS) | G | 6' 0" (1.83 m) | 201 lb (91 kg) | 1991-11-12 | Lac-Beauport, Quebec | South Shore (EJHL) | — |
| 2 | | Trevor Owens | Freshman | D | 6' 1" (1.85 m) | 200 lb (91 kg) | 1993-11-24 | Raleigh, North Carolina | New Jersey (USPHL) | — |
| 4 | | Gus Harms | Sophomore | D | 6' 1" (1.85 m) | 200 lb (91 kg) | 1993-02-10 | Pelham, New York | Valley (EJHL) | — |
| 5 | | Matt Benning | Sophomore | D | 6' 0" (1.83 m) | 203 lb (92 kg) | 1994-05-25 | St. Albert, Alberta | Dubuque (USHL) | BOS, 175th overall 2012 |
| 6 | | Mike Gunn | Junior | D | 6' 3" (1.91 m) | 210 lb (95 kg) | 1992-05-11 | Livonia, Michigan | Youngstown (USHL) | — |
| 7 | | Mike McMurtry | Junior | F | 6' 0" (1.83 m) | 195 lb (88 kg) | 1992-06-05 | Greely, Ontario | Gloucester (CCHL) | — |
| 8 | | Adam Reid (A) | Senior | F | 6' 3" (1.91 m) | 200 lb (91 kg) | 1993-01-29 | Chino Hills, California | US NTDP (USHL) | — |
| 9 | | Dylan Sikura | Freshman | F | 5' 11" (1.8 m) | 160 lb (73 kg) | 1995-06-01 | Aurora, Ontario | Aurora (OJHL) | CHI, 178th overall 2014 |
| 11 | | Jake Schechter | Sophomore | D | 5' 10" (1.78 m) | 185 lb (84 kg) | 1993-03-09 | Naples, Florida | Valley (EJHL) | — |
| 12 | | Zach Aston-Reese | Sophomore | F | 6' 1" (1.85 m) | 180 lb (82 kg) | 1994-08-10 | Staten Island, New York | Lincoln (USHL) | — |
| 14 | | Garret Cockerill | Freshman | D | 5' 11" (1.8 m) | 205 lb (93 kg) | 1994-02-19 | Brighton, Michigan | Sioux City (USHL) | — |
| 15 | | Kevin Roy | Junior | F | 5' 10" (1.78 m) | 170 lb (77 kg) | 1993-05-20 | Lac-Beauport, Quebec | Lincoln (USHL) | ANA, 97th overall 2012 |
| 16 | | Brendan Collier | Sophomore | F | 5' 9" (1.75 m) | 184 lb (83 kg) | 1993-10-08 | Charlestown, Massachusetts | Valley Jr. Warriors (EJHL) | CAR, 189th overall 2012 |
| 17 | | Torin Snydeman | Senior (RS) | F | 6' 0" (1.83 m) | 200 lb (91 kg) | 1990-01-15 | Groton, Massachusetts | Sacred Heart (AHA) | — |
| 18 | | John Stevens | Sophomore | F | 6' 2" (1.88 m) | 180 lb (82 kg) | 1994-04-17 | Sea Isle City, New Jersey | Dubuque (USHL) | — |
| 19 | | Mike Szmatula | Sophomore | F | 5' 9" (1.75 m) | 178 lb (81 kg) | 1992-08-10 | Commerce Township, Michigan | Dubuque (USHL) | — |
| 21 | | Nolan Stevens | Freshman | F | 6' 2" (1.88 m) | 186 lb (84 kg) | 1996-07-22 | Sea Isle City, New Jersey | US NTDP (USHL) | — |
| 22 | | Tanner Pond | Sophomore | F | 5' 11" (1.8 m) | 183 lb (83 kg) | 1993-05-31 | Walled Lake, Michigan | Green Bay (USHL) | — |
| 23 | | Colton Saucerman | Junior | D | 5' 9" (1.75 m) | 195 lb (88 kg) | 1992-05-05 | Colorado Springs, Colorado | Lincoln (USHL) | — |
| 24 | | Mike Jamieson | Sophomore | F | 5' 8" (1.73 m) | 175 lb (79 kg) | 1992-07-01 | Billerica, Massachusetts | Islanders HC (EJHL) | — |
| 26 | | Will Messa | Sophomore | F | 5' 11" (1.8 m) | 190 lb (86 kg) | 1993-04-19 | Parkland, Florida | Boston (EJHL) | — |
| 27 | | Dalen Hedges | Sophomore | F | 5' 7" (1.7 m) | 172 lb (78 kg) | 1994-03-30 | Ottawa, Ontario | Nepean (CCHL) | — |
| 28 | | Ryan Rosenthal | Sophomore | F | 6' 2" (1.88 m) | 200 lb (91 kg) | 1993-04-30 | Montvale, New Jersey | Coquitlam (BCHL) | — |
| 31 | | Clay Witt | Senior (RS) | G | 6' 1" (1.85 m) | 187 lb (85 kg) | 1991-08-24 | Brandon, Florida | Sioux Falls (USHL) | — |
| 39 | | Jake Theut | Freshman | G | 6' 3" (1.91 m) | 180 lb (82 kg) | 1993-10-16 | Washington, Michigan | New Hampshire (EHL) | — |
| 44 | | Dax Lauwers (A) | Senior (RS) | D | 6' 2" (1.88 m) | 210 lb (95 kg) | 1991-09-27 | Anchorage, Alaska | Lincoln (USHL) | — |
| 47 | | Dustin Darou | Junior | D | 6' 1" (1.85 m) | 205 lb (93 kg) | 1991-10-29 | Perth, Ontario | Carleton Place (CCHL) | — |
| 61 | | Jarrett Fennell | Junior | D | 6' 2" (1.88 m) | 205 lb (93 kg) | 1991-03-28 | Innisfil, Ontario | Aurora (OJHL) | — |

=== Coaching staff ===
| Name | Position | Seasons at Northeastern | Alma mater |
|---|---|---|---|
| Jim Madigan | Head coach | 4 | Northeastern University (1986) |
| Jerry Keefe | Associate Head Coach | 4 | Providence College (2000) |
| Jason Smith | Assistant coach | 2 | Salem State University (1998) |

== Standings ==
2014–15 Hockey East men's standings
| | Conference record | | | | | | | Overall record | | | | | |
| | GP | W | L | T | PTS | GF | GA | GP | W | L | T | GF | GA |
|---|---|---|---|---|---|---|---|---|---|---|---|---|---|
| #2 Boston University †* | 22 | 14 | 5 | 3 | 31 | 88 | 55 | 41 | 28 | 8 | 5 | 158 | 95 |
| #1 Providence | 22 | 13 | 8 | 1 | 27 | 61 | 37 | 41 | 26 | 13 | 2 | 123 | 84 |
| #13 Boston College | 22 | 12 | 7 | 3 | 27 | 60 | 50 | 38 | 21 | 14 | 3 | 107 | 91 |
| #17 Massachusetts–Lowell | 22 | 11 | 7 | 4 | 26 | 70 | 52 | 39 | 21 | 12 | 6 | 134 | 101 |
| Notre Dame | 22 | 10 | 7 | 5 | 25 | 64 | 54 | 42 | 18 | 19 | 5 | 126 | 116 |
| Northeastern | 22 | 11 | 9 | 2 | 24 | 70 | 69 | 36 | 16 | 16 | 4 | 107 | 107 |
| Vermont | 22 | 10 | 9 | 3 | 23 | 62 | 53 | 41 | 22 | 15 | 4 | 110 | 91 |
| New Hampshire | 22 | 10 | 11 | 1 | 21 | 66 | 68 | 40 | 19 | 19 | 2 | 119 | 109 |
| Connecticut | 22 | 7 | 11 | 4 | 18 | 42 | 74 | 36 | 10 | 19 | 7 | 66 | 111 |
| Maine | 22 | 8 | 12 | 2 | 18 | 64 | 74 | 39 | 14 | 22 | 3 | 108 | 127 |
| Merrimack | 22 | 5 | 14 | 3 | 13 | 38 | 56 | 38 | 16 | 18 | 4 | 81 | 93 |
| Massachusetts | 22 | 5 | 16 | 1 | 11 | 59 | 102 | 36 | 11 | 23 | 2 | 99 | 152 |
Championship: March 21, 2015 † indicates conference regular season champion; * indicates conference tournament champion Rankings: USCHO.com Top 20 Poll; updated March 9, 2015

== Schedule ==
| Date | Time | Opponent^{#} | Rank^{#} | Site | TV | Result | Attendance | Record |
Exhibition
| October 5 | 3:00 PM | Acadia* | #16 | Matthews Arena • Boston, Massachusetts | | L 2–3 | 1,507 | 0–0–0 |
Regular Season
| October 11 | 7:00 PM | Vermont | #16 | Matthews Arena • Boston, Massachusetts | | L 2–6 | 3,298 | 0–1–0 (0–1–0) |
| October 17 | 7:00 PM | at #6 Colgate* | | Starr Arena • Hamilton, New York | | L 0–3 | 1,551 | 0–2–0 |
| October 18 | 7:00 PM | at #6 Colgate* | | Starr Arena • Hamilton, New York | | L 0–3 | 1,506 | 0–3–0 |
| October 24 | 7:00 PM | UMass | | Matthew Arena • Boston, Massachusetts | | L 2–3 | 4,370 | 0–4–0 (0–2–0) |
| November 1 | 7:00 PM | at Quinnipiac* | | TD Bank Sports Center • Hamden, Connecticut | | L 2–3 | 3,305 | 0–5–0 |
| November 2 | 4:00 PM | at Quinnipiac* | | TD Bank Sports Center • Hamden, Connecticut | | L 3–4 | 2,887 | 0–6–0 |
| November 7 | 7:15 PM | at #6 UMass Lowell | | Tsongas Center • Lowell, Massachusetts | | T 3–3 ^{OT} | 4,819 | 0–6–1 (0–2–1) |
| November 8 | 7:00 PM | #6 UMass Lowell | | Matthews Arena • Boston, Massachusetts | | L 0–5 | 2,710 | 0–7–1 (0–3–1) |
| November 14 | 7:00 PM | at New Hampshire | | Whittemore Center • Durham, New Hampshire | | L 3–5 | 5,061 | 0–8–1 (0–4–1) |
| November 15 | 7:00 PM | New Hampshire | | Matthews Arena • Boston, Massachusetts | | W 2–1 | 3,648 | 1–8–1 (1–4–1) |
| November 21 | 7:00 PM | at Merrimack | | Lawler Arena • North Andover, Massachusetts | | L 2–4 | 2,411 | 1–9–1 (1–5–1) |
| November 22 | 7:00 PM | Merrimack | | Matthews Arena • Boston, Massachusetts | | W 3–1 | 2,010 | 2–9–1 (2–5–1) |
| November 29 | 7:00 PM | #3 Minnesota* | | Matthews Arena • Boston, Massachusetts | | W 3–2 | 2,264 | 3–9–1 |
| December 3 | 7:00 PM | #16 Providence | | Matthews Arena • Boston, Massachusetts | | L 1–5 | 1,634 | 3–10–1 (2–6–1) |
| December 6 | 4:00 PM | at #16 Providence | | Schneider Arena • Providence, Rhode Island | | W 2–1 | 2,609 | 4–10–1 (3–6–1) |
| December 16 | 7:00 PM | at UMass* | | Mullins Center • Amherst, Massachusetts | | W 8–3 | 1,080 | 5–10–1 |
| January 2 | 7:00 PM | St. Lawrence* | | Matthews Arena • Boston, Massachusetts | | T 3–3 ^{OT} | 1,642 | 5–10–2 |
| January 3 | 7:00 PM | St. Lawrence* | | Matthews Arena • Boston, Massachusetts | | W 4–2 | 1,537 | 6–10–2 |
| January 6 | 7:00 PM | #19 Yale* | | Matthews Arena • Boston, Massachusetts | | W 3–2 | 1,350 | 7–10–2 |
| January 9 | 7:00 PM | #16 Boston College | | Matthews Arena • Boston, Massachusetts | | T 1–1 ^{OT} | 3,998 | 7–10–3 (3–6–2) |
| January 10 | 7:00 PM | at #16 Boston College | | Kelley Rink • Chestnut Hill, Massachusetts | NESN | L 2–4 | 4,615 | 7–11–3 (3–7–2) |
| January 16 | 7:00 PM | at #10 Vermont | | Gutterson Fieldhouse • Burlington, Vermont | | W 4–1 | 4,007 | 8–11–3 (4–7–2) |
| January 17 | 7:00 PM | at #10 Vermont* | | Gutterson Fieldhouse • Burlington, Vermont | | T 2–2 ^{OT} | 4,007 | 8–11–4 |
| January 23 | 7:00 PM | Notre Dame | | Matthews Arena • Boston, Massachusetts | | W 3–2 | 3,346 | 9–11–4 (5–7–2) |
| January 24 | 7:00 PM | Notre Dame | | Matthews Arena • Boston, Massachusetts | | W 4–2 | 2,983 | 10–11–4 (6–7–2) |
| February 3 | 8:00 PM | vs. #11 Boston College* | | TD Garden • Boston, Massachusetts (Beanpot) | | W 3–2 | 14,520 | 11–11–4 |
| February 6 | 7:00 PM | at UMass | | Mullins Center • Amherst, Massachusetts | | W 5–3 | 2,522 | 12–11–4 (7–7–2) |
| February 13 | 7:00 PM | Connecticut | | Matthews Arena • Boston, Massachusetts | | W 9–0 | 2,308 | 13–11–4 (8–7–2) |
| February 14 | 3:00 PM | at Connecticut | | XL Center • Hartford, Connecticut | | W 6–1 | 5,086 | 14–11–4 (9–7–2) |
| February 20 | 7:30 PM | at Maine | | Alfond Arena • Orono, Maine | FCS | W 6–4 | 3,866 | 15–11–4 (10–7–2) |
| February 21 | 7:00 PM | at Maine | | Alfond Arena • Orono, Maine | | L 3–6 | 3,786 | 15–12–4 (10–8–2) |
| February 23 | 7:30 PM | vs. #4 Boston University* | | TD Garden • Boston, Massachusetts (Beanpot) | | L 3–4 ^{OT} | 14,253 | 15–13–4 |
| February 27 | 7:30 PM | at #4 Boston University | | Agganis Arena • Boston, Massachusetts | | W 6–5 | 5,729 | 16–13–4 (11–8–2) |
| February 28 | 7:00 PM | #4 Boston University | | Matthews Arena • Boston, Massachusetts | | L 1–6 | 4,746 | 16–14–4 (11–9–2) |
Postseason
| March 6 | 7:00 PM | Merrimack* | | Matthews Arena • Boston, Massachusetts (Hockey East First Round) | | L 2–3 ^{OT} | 1,826 | 16–15–4 |
| March 7 | 4:00 PM | Merrimack* | | Matthews Arena • Boston, Massachusetts (Hockey East First Round) | | L 1–2 ^{2OT} | 1,519 | 16–16–4 |
*Non-conference game. ^{#}Rankings from USCHO.com Poll. All times are in Eastern Time.

== Rankings ==
| Poll | Week | | | | | | | | | | | | | | | | | | | | | | | |
| Poll | Pre | 1 | 2 | 3 | 4 | 5 | 6 | 7 | 8 | 9 | 10 | 11 | 12 | 13 | 14 | 15 | 16 | 17 | 18 | 19 | 20 | 21 | 22 | 23 (Final) |
|---|---|---|---|---|---|---|---|---|---|---|---|---|---|---|---|---|---|---|---|---|---|---|---|---|
| USCHO.com | 16 | RV | RV | NR | NR | NR | NR | NR | NR | NR | NR | NR | NR | NR | RV | NR | NR | RV | RV | RV | NR | NR | NR | NR |
| USA Today | RV | RV | NR | NR | NR | NR | NR | NR | NR | NR | NR | NR | NR | NR | NR | NR | RV | RV | NR | NR | NR | NR | NR | NR |
