= 2014–15 Boston University Terriers men's ice hockey season =

Hockey East regular season champions 63rd Annual Beanpot champions Hockey East Tournament champions
- Conference: Hockey East
- Home ice: Agganis Arena

Rankings
- USCHO.com: #2
- USA Today: #2

Record
- Overall: 28–7–5 (14–5–3 HEA)
- Home: 10–5–3
- Road: 11–2–2
- Neutral: 7–0–0

Coaches and captains
- Head coach: David Quinn
- Assistant coaches: Steve Greeley; Albie O'Connell; Mike Geragosian

The 2014–15 Boston University Terriers men's ice hockey team represented Boston University in the 2014–15 NCAA Division I men's ice hockey season. The team is coached by David Quinn, in his 2nd season with the Terriers. The Terriers play their home games at Agganis Arena on campus in Boston, Massachusetts, competing in Hockey East.

== Personnel ==
=== Roster ===
As of end of season.

No.	Nat.	Player	Class	Pos	Height	Weight	DoB	Hometown	Previous team	NHL rights
1		Anthony Moccia	Senior	G	5' 8" (1.73 m)	160 lb (73 kg)	1990-12-23	Medford, Massachusetts	BB&N (USHS–MA)	—
2		Ahti Oksanen	Junior	F	6' 3" (1.91 m)	207 lb (94 kg)	1993-03-10	Kirkkonummi, Finland	Blues J20 (Jr. A SM-Liiga)	—
3		T.J. Ryan	Freshman	D	6' 0" (1.83 m)	185 lb (84 kg)	1992-11-13	West Newton, Massachusetts	South Shore (EJHL)	—
4		Brandon Hickey	Freshman	D	6' 2" (1.88 m)	190 lb (86 kg)	1996-04-13	Leduc, Alberta	Spruce Grove (AJHL)	CGY, 64th overall 2014
5		Matt Grzelcyk (C)	Junior	D	5' 9" (1.75 m)	176 lb (80 kg)	1994-01-05	Charlestown, Massachusetts	US NTDP (USHL)	BOS, 85th overall 2012
7		Cason Hohmann (A)	Senior	F	5' 9" (1.75 m)	175 lb (79 kg)	1993-01-10	Arlington, Texas	Cedar Rapids (USHL)	—
9		Jack Eichel	Freshman	F	6' 2" (1.88 m)	194 lb (88 kg)	1996-10-28	Chelmsford, Massachusetts	US NTDP (USHL)	—
10		Danny O'Regan	Junior	F	5' 10" (1.78 m)	175 lb (79 kg)	1994-01-30	Needham, Massachusetts	US NTDP (USHL)	SJS, 138th overall 2012
11		Mike Moran	Junior	F	6' 1" (1.85 m)	200 lb (91 kg)	1991-09-07	Marshfield, Massachusetts	Bay State (EJHL)	—
12		Chase Phelps	Freshman	F	6' 3" (1.91 m)	187 lb (85 kg)	1996-04-26	Edina, Minnesota	Shattuck-Saint Mary's (Midget AAA)	—
13		Nikolas Olsson	Freshman	F	6' 1" (1.85 m)	181 lb (82 kg)	1994-06-14	Escondido, California	Sioux City (USHL)	—
14		Dillon Lawrence	Sophomore	F	6' 3" (1.91 m)	187 lb (85 kg)	1995-03-22	Toronto, Ontario	Toronto (GTHL)	—
15		Nick Roberto	Sophomore	F	5' 9" (1.75 m)	173 lb (78 kg)	1994-04-04	Wakefield, Massachusetts	Kimball Union (USHS–NH)	—
16		John MacLeod	Freshman	D	6' 1" (1.85 m)	203 lb (92 kg)	1996-06-02	Dracut, Massachusetts	US NTDP (USHL)	TBL, 57th overall 2014
17		Evan Rodrigues (A)	Senior	F	5' 11" (1.8 m)	178 lb (81 kg)	1993-07-28	Etobicoke, Ontario	Georgetown (OJHL)	—
18		Kevin Duane	Sophomore	F	6' 5" (1.96 m)	210 lb (95 kg)	1994-01-16	New Canaan, Connecticut	Boston (EJHL)	—
19		Robbie Baillargeon	Sophomore	F	6' 0" (1.83 m)	175 lb (79 kg)	1993-11-26	Enfield, Connecticut	Omaha (USHL)	OTT, 136th overall 2012
20		Brien Diffley	Freshman	D	6' 2" (1.88 m)	184 lb (83 kg)	1995-07-08	Burlington, Massachusetts	BB&N (USHS–MA)	—
21		Matt Lane	Junior	F	5' 10" (1.78 m)	175 lb (79 kg)	1994-03-15	Rochester, New York	US NTDP (USHL)	—
22		Tommy Kelly	Sophomore	F	5' 10" (1.78 m)	186 lb (84 kg)	1994-09-15	Natick, Massachusetts	St. Sebastian's (USHS–MA)	—
23		J.D. Carrabino	Junior (RS)	D	6' 6" (1.98 m)	230 lb (104 kg)	1991-02-17	New Canaan, Connecticut	Clarkson (ECAC)	—
25		Brandon Fortunato	Freshman	D	5' 10" (1.78 m)	150 lb (68 kg)	1996-06-07	North Hills, New York	US NTDP (USHL)	—
26		A.J. Greer	Freshman	F	6' 3" (1.91 m)	205 lb (93 kg)	1996-12-14	Notre-Dame-des-Prairies, Quebec	Kimball Union (USHS–NH)	—
27		Doyle Somerby	Sophomore	D	6' 5" (1.96 m)	223 lb (101 kg)	1994-07-04	Marblehead, Massachusetts	Kimball Union (USHS–NH)	NYI, 125th overall 2012
28		J.J. Piccinich	Freshman	F	6' 0" (1.83 m)	184 lb (83 kg)	1996-06-12	Paramus, New Jersey	Youngstown (USHL)	TOR, 103rd overall 2014
29		Matt O'Connor	Junior	G	6' 6" (1.98 m)	204 lb (93 kg)	1992-02-14	Toronto, Ontario	Youngstown (USHL)	—
33		Connor LaCouvee	Freshman	G	6' 0" (1.83 m)	196 lb (89 kg)	1994-05-24	Qualicum Beach, B.C.	Alberni Valley (BCHL)	—

=== Coaching staff ===
Name	Position	Seasons at Boston University	Alma mater
David Quinn	Head coach	2	Boston University (1989)
Steve Greeley	Associate head coach	2	Boston University (2004)
Albie O'Connell	Assistant coach	2	Boston University (1999)
Mike Geragosian	Assistant coach	16	University of Massachusetts Lowell (1975)

== Standings ==
2014–15 Hockey East men's standings
	Conference record							Overall record					
	GP	W	L	T	PTS	GF	GA	GP	W	L	T	GF	GA
#2 Boston University †*	22	14	5	3	31	88	55	41	28	8	5	158	95
#1 Providence	22	13	8	1	27	61	37	41	26	13	2	123	84
#13 Boston College	22	12	7	3	27	60	50	38	21	14	3	107	91
#17 Massachusetts–Lowell	22	11	7	4	26	70	52	39	21	12	6	134	101
Notre Dame	22	10	7	5	25	64	54	42	18	19	5	126	116
Northeastern	22	11	9	2	24	70	69	36	16	16	4	107	107
Vermont	22	10	9	3	23	62	53	41	22	15	4	110	91
New Hampshire	22	10	11	1	21	66	68	40	19	19	2	119	109
Connecticut	22	7	11	4	18	42	74	36	10	19	7	66	111
Maine	22	8	12	2	18	64	74	39	14	22	3	108	127
Merrimack	22	5	14	3	13	38	56	38	16	18	4	81	93
Massachusetts	22	5	16	1	11	59	102	36	11	23	2	99	152
Championship: March 21, 2015 † indicates conference regular season champion; * indicates conference tournament champion Rankings: USCHO.com Top 20 Poll; updated March 9, 2015

== Schedule ==
Date	Time	Opponent^{#}	Rank^{#}	Site	TV	Result	Attendance	Record
Exhibition
October 4	4:00 PM	St. Thomas*	#20	Agganis Arena • Boston, Massachusetts		W 12–1	3,542	0–0–0
Regular Season
October 10	7:00 PM	at UMass	#20	Mullins Center • Amherst, Massachusetts		W 8–1	4,288	1–0–0 (1–0–0)
October 24	7:30 PM	Michigan State*	#12	Agganis Arena • Boston, Massachusetts		W 1–0	4,639	2–0–0
October 25	7:15 PM	#14 Michigan*	#12	Agganis Arena • Boston, Massachusetts		W 3–2	5,846	3–0–0
October 31	7:00 PM	at #9 Providence	#6	Schneider Arena • Providence, Rhode Island		W 4–1	2,978	4–0–0 (2–0–0)
November 1	7:00 PM	#9 Providence	#6	Agganis Arena • Boston, Massachusetts		L 1–2	4,648	4–1–0 (2–1–0)
November 7	8:00 PM	at #3 Boston College	#5	Kelley Rink • Chestnut Hill, Massachusetts	NBCSN	W 5–3	7,884	5–1–0 (3–1–0)
November 8	7:00 PM	Connecticut	#5	Agganis Arena • Boston, Massachusetts		T 4–4 ^{OT}	4,658	5–1–1 (3–1–1)
November 14	7:30 PM	at Maine	#3	Alfond Arena • Orono, Maine		W 3–1	4,919	6–1–1 (4–1–1)
November 21	7:30 PM	Maine	#3	Agganis Arena • Boston, Massachusetts		W 3–2 ^{OT}	5,291	7–1–1 (5–1–1)
November 22	3:30 PM	at Connecticut	#3	XL Center • Hartford, Connecticut		W 5–2	7,712	8–1–1 (6–1–1)
November 25	7:00 PM	#18 Harvard*	#1	Agganis Arena • Boston, Massachusetts		L 2–3 ^{OT}	4,456	8–2–1
November 29	4:00 PM	#9 Colgate*	#1	Agganis Arena • Boston, Massachusetts		W 5–2	4,585	9–2–1
November 30	4:00 PM	at Dartmouth*	#1	Thompson Arena • Hanover, New Hampshire		L 0–2	2,314	9–3–1
December 5	7:00 PM	at #18 Merrimack	#3	Lawler Arena • North Andover, Massachusetts		T 1–1 ^{OT}	2,549	9–3–2 (6–1–2)
December 6	7:00 PM	#18 Merrimack	#3	Agganis Arena • Boston, Massachusetts		W 4–2	4,366	10–3–2 (7–1–2)
December 13	7:00 PM	at RPI*	#2	Houston Field House • Troy, New York		W 5–1	3,720	11–3–2
January 3	7:00 PM	Union*	#1	Agganis Arena • Boston, Massachusetts		T 3–3 ^{OT}	5,286	11–3–3
January 9	8:00 PM	at Wisconsin*	#2	Kohl Center • Madison, Wisconsin		T 3–3 ^{OT}	9,248	11–3–4
January 10	8:00 PM	at Wisconsin*	#2	Kohl Center • Madison, Wisconsin		W 6–1	11,776	12–3–4
January 16	7:00 PM	#17 Boston College	#2	Agganis Arena • Boston, Massachusetts		L 2–4	6,150	12–4–4 (7–2–2)
January 18	2:00 PM	#6 UMass Lowell	#2	Agganis Arena • Boston, Massachusetts		W 4–3 ^{OT}	4,786	13–4–4 (8–2–2)
January 23	7:00 PM	at #12 Vermont	#3	Gutterson Fieldhouse • Burlington, Vermont		W 4–2	4,007	14–4–4 (9–2–2)
January 24	7:00 PM	at #12 Vermont	#3	Gutterson Fieldhouse • Burlington, Vermont		W 2–1	4,007	15–4–4 (10–2–2)
January 30	7:30 PM	UMass	#2	Agganis Arena • Boston, Massachusetts		W 9–5	5,026	16–4–4 (11–2–2)
February 3	5:00 PM	vs. #6 Harvard*	#3	TD Garden • Boston, Massachusetts (Beanpot)		W 4–3 ^{2OT}	14,520	17–4–4
February 6	7:15 PM	at #12 UMass Lowell	#3	Tsongas Center • Lowell, Massachusetts		W 5–2	7,241	18–4–4 (12–2–2)
February 13	7:00 PM	New Hampshire	#3	Agganis Arena • Boston, Massachusetts		W 6–3	4,596	19–4–4 (13–2–2)
February 14	7:00 PM	at New Hampshire	#3	Whittemore Center • Durham, New Hampshire		L 3–4	4,896	19–5–4 (13–3–2)
February 20	7:30 PM	Notre Dame	#3	Agganis Arena • Boston, Massachusetts		T 2–2 ^{OT}	5,376	19–5–5 (13–3–3)
February 21	7:00 PM	Notre Dame	#3	Agganis Arena • Boston, Massachusetts		L 2–3	5,049	19–6–5 (13–4–3)
February 23	7:30 PM	vs. Northeastern*	#4	TD Garden • Boston, Massachusetts (Beanpot)		W 4–3 ^{OT}	14,253	20–6–5
February 27	7:30 PM	Northeastern	#4	Agganis Arena • Boston, Massachusetts		L 5–6	5,729	20–7–5 (13–5–3)
February 28	7:00 PM	at Northeastern	#4	Matthews Arena • Boston, Massachusetts		W 6–1	4,746	21–7–5 (14–5–3)
Postseason
March 13	7:00 PM	Merrimack*	#3	Agganis Arena • Boston, Massachusetts (Hockey East Quarterfinal)		W 6–2	2,612	22–7–5
March 14	4:00 PM	Merrimack*	#3	Agganis Arena • Boston, Massachusetts (Hockey East Quarterfinal)		W 5–0	3,069	23–7–5
March 20	8:00 PM	vs. New Hampshire*	#3	TD Garden • Boston, Massachusetts (Hockey East Semifinal)	NBCSN	W 4–1	13,263	24–7–5
March 21	7:00 PM	vs. #12 UMass Lowell*	#3	TD Garden • Boston, Massachusetts (Hockey East championship)	NBCSN	W 5–3	13,352	25–7–5
March 27	2:00 PM	vs. #17 Yale*	#2	Verizon Wireless Arena • Manchester, New Hampshire (NCAA First Round)	ESPNU	W 3–2 ^{OT}	5,123	26–7–5
March 28	5:30 PM	vs. #7 Minnesota–Duluth*	#2	Verizon Wireless Arena • Manchester, New Hampshire (NCAA Second Round)	ESPN2	W 3–2	4,721	27–7–5
April 9	8:30 PM	vs. #3 North Dakota*	#2	TD Garden • Boston, Massachusetts (NCAA Frozen Four)	ESPN2	W 5–3	18,022	28–7–5
April 11	7:30 PM	vs. #15 Providence*	#2	TD Garden • Boston, Massachusetts (NCAA national championship)	ESPN	L 3-4	18,022	28–8–5
*Non-conference game. ^{#}Rankings from USCHO.com Poll. All times are in Eastern Time.

== Rankings ==
Poll	Week																							
Poll	Pre	1	2	3	4	5	6	7	8	9	10	11	12	13	14	15	16	17	18	19	20	21	22	23 (Final)
USCHO.com	20	14	12	6	5	3	3 (14)	1 (42)	3 (4)	2 (1)	1 (18)	2 (18)	2 (12)	3	2 (5)	3 (16)	3 (6)	3	4	3	3 (4)	3 (3)	2 (6)	2 (1)
USA Today	NR	13	11	6	5	3	2 (10)	1 (27)	2 (2)	2 (1)	1 (19)	2 (12)	3 (7)	3	2 (7)	2 (15)	2 (12)	2 (1)	4	3	3 (3)	3 (1)	2 (4)	2
