= 2014–15 New Hampshire Wildcats men's ice hockey season =

Men's college hockey team season

- Conference: Hockey East
- Home ice: Whittemore Center

Rankings
- USCHO.com: RV

Record
- Overall: 19–19–2 (10–11–1 HEA)
- Home: 11–6–2
- Road: 8–12–0
- Neutral: 1–2–0

Coaches and captains
- Head coach: Dick Umile

The 2014–15 New Hampshire Wildcats men's ice hockey team represented the University of New Hampshire during the 2014–15 NCAA Division I men's ice hockey season. The team was coached by Dick Umile, in his 25th season with the Wildcats. The Wildcats played their home games at the Whittemore Center on campus in Durham, New Hampshire, competing in Hockey East.

== Previous season ==
In 2013–14, the Wildcats finished 4th in Hockey East with a record of 21–17–1, 11–9–0 in conference play. In the 2014 Hockey East Men's Ice Hockey Tournament, they lost in the championship to UMass Lowell, by a score of 4–0. They failed to qualify for the 2014 NCAA Division I Men's Ice Hockey Tournament.

== Personnel ==
=== Roster ===
As of December 26, 2014.

No.	Nat.	Player	Class	Pos	Height	Weight	DoB	Hometown	Previous team	NHL rights
2		Matias Cleland	Sophomore	D	5' 11" (1.8 m)	185 lb (84 kg)	1994-01-28	Longmont, Colorado	Omaha (USHL)	—
3		Warren Foegele	Freshman	F	6' 1" (1.85 m)	185 lb (84 kg)	1996-04-01	Unionville, Ontario	St. Andrew's (CAHS–ON)	CAR, 67th overall 2014
4		Dylan Maller	Sophomore	D	6' 1" (1.85 m)	198 lb (90 kg)	1994-04-15	Parkland, Florida	Tri-City (USHL)	—
5		Dylan Chanter	Freshman	D	6' 3" (1.91 m)	215 lb (98 kg)	1995-09-17	Armstrong, British Columbia	Vernon (BCHL)	—
6		Cameron Marks	Freshman	D	6' 0" (1.83 m)	187 lb (85 kg)	1995-04-09	North Vancouver, British Columbia	Coquitlam (BCHL)	—
7		Harry Quast	Junior	D	6' 4" (1.93 m)	215 lb (98 kg)	1991-03-26	Chagrin Falls, Ohio	Bay State (EJHL)	—
8		Jamie Hill	Junior	F	5' 9" (1.75 m)	175 lb (79 kg)	1992-02-03	Glassboro, New Jersey	Waterloo (USHL)	—
9		Matt Willows	Senior	F	5' 9" (1.75 m)	185 lb (84 kg)	1991-07-24	Congers, New York	New Jersey (EJHL)	—
10		Jason Salvaggio	Freshman	F	6' 0" (1.83 m)	190 lb (86 kg)	1994-10-01	Hanson, Massachusetts	Indiana (USHL)	—
11		Michael McNicholas	Freshman	F	5' 10" (1.78 m)	175 lb (79 kg)	1994-03-23	Manhattan Beach, California	Vernon (BCHL)	—
12		Shane Eiserman	Freshman	F	6' 1" (1.85 m)	200 lb (91 kg)	1995-10-10	Newburyport, Massachusetts	Dubuque (USHL)	OTT, 100th overall 2014
13		Dan Correale	Junior	F	5' 10" (1.78 m)	185 lb (84 kg)	1991-08-21	Prince George, British Columbia	Grande Prairie (AJHL)	—
14		Maxim Gaudreault	Junior	F	6' 0" (1.83 m)	190 lb (86 kg)	1992-07-16	Annapolis, Maryland	Sioux City (USHL)	—
15		Richard Boyd	Freshman	D	6' 3" (1.91 m)	182 lb (83 kg)	1995-06-07	Delray Beach, Florida	Cushing (USHS–MA)	—
16		Tyler Kelleher	Sophomore	F	5' 6" (1.68 m)	154 lb (70 kg)	1995-01-02	Longmeadow, Massachusetts	US NTDP (USHL)	—
17		Jay Camper	Senior	F	5' 11" (1.8 m)	180 lb (82 kg)	1991-04-17	Rocky River, Ohio	Chicago (USHL)	—
18		Andrew Poturalski	Freshman	F	5' 10" (1.78 m)	190 lb (86 kg)	1994-01-14	Williamsville, New York	Cedar Rapids (USHL)	—
19		Casey Thrush	Senior	F	6' 1" (1.85 m)	190 lb (86 kg)	1992-05-05	Easton, Maryland	Muskegon (USHL)	—
20		Collin Bourque	Sophomore	F	5' 7" (1.7 m)	155 lb (70 kg)	1993-02-11	Goffstown, New Hampshire	New England (AEHL)	—
21		John Furgele	Freshman	D	5' 10" (1.78 m)	185 lb (84 kg)	1993-01-15	Glen Mills, Pennsylvania	New Jersey (USPHL)	—
22		Brett Pesce	Junior	D	6' 3" (1.91 m)	200 lb (91 kg)	1994-11-15	Tarrytown, New York	New Jersey (EJHL)	CAR, 66th overall 2013
23		Kyle Smith	Junior	F	6' 1" (1.85 m)	185 lb (84 kg)	1992-02-14	Lumberton, New Jersey	Boston (EJHL)	—
24		Collin MacDonald	Junior	F	6' 2" (1.88 m)	200 lb (91 kg)	1992-06-21	West Milford, New Jersey	New Jersey (EJHL)	—
28		Grayson Downing	Senior	F	6' 0" (1.83 m)	200 lb (91 kg)	1992-04-18	Abbotsford, British Columbia	Westside (BCHL)	—
32		Jamie Regan	Junior	G	6' 2" (1.88 m)	180 lb (82 kg)	1992-01-15	Chagrin Falls, Ohio	Philadelphia (EJHL)	—
35		Jeff Wyer	Senior	G	6' 1" (1.85 m)	185 lb (84 kg)	1991-07-05	Reading, Massachusetts	Valley (EJHL)	—
41		Adam Clark	Freshman	G	6' 5" (1.96 m)	200 lb (91 kg)	1993-02-28	Sherwood Park, Alberta	Salmon Arm (BCHL)	—
46		Ryan Randall	Senior	D	6' 0" (1.83 m)	195 lb (88 kg)	1992-02-20	Durham, New Hampshire	New Hampshire (EJHL)	—

=== Coaching staff ===
Name	Position	Seasons at New Hampshire	Alma mater
Dick Umile	Head coach	25	University of New Hampshire (1972)
Scott Borek	Associate head coach	14	Dartmouth College (1985)
Glenn Stewart	Associate head coach	1	University of New Hampshire (1994)

== Standings ==
2014–15 Hockey East men's standings
	Conference record							Overall record					
	GP	W	L	T	PTS	GF	GA	GP	W	L	T	GF	GA
#2 Boston University †*	22	14	5	3	31	88	55	41	28	8	5	158	95
#1 Providence	22	13	8	1	27	61	37	41	26	13	2	123	84
#13 Boston College	22	12	7	3	27	60	50	38	21	14	3	107	91
#17 Massachusetts–Lowell	22	11	7	4	26	70	52	39	21	12	6	134	101
Notre Dame	22	10	7	5	25	64	54	42	18	19	5	126	116
Northeastern	22	11	9	2	24	70	69	36	16	16	4	107	107
Vermont	22	10	9	3	23	62	53	41	22	15	4	110	91
New Hampshire	22	10	11	1	21	66	68	40	19	19	2	119	109
Connecticut	22	7	11	4	18	42	74	36	10	19	7	66	111
Maine	22	8	12	2	18	64	74	39	14	22	3	108	127
Merrimack	22	5	14	3	13	38	56	38	16	18	4	81	93
Massachusetts	22	5	16	1	11	59	102	36	11	23	2	99	152
Championship: March 21, 2015 † indicates conference regular season champion; * indicates conference tournament champion Rankings: USCHO.com Top 20 Poll; updated March 9, 2015

== Schedule ==
Date	Time	Opponent^{#}	Rank^{#}	Site	TV	Result	Attendance	Record
Exhibition
October 4	4:00 PM	St. Francis Xavier*	#19	Whittemore Center • Durham, New Hampshire		L 0–2	3,602	0–0–0
Regular Season
October 11	7:30 PM	at #5 Union*	#19	Achilles Rink • Schenectady, New York		L 1–3	2,030	0–1–0
October 17	7:30 PM	at #10 Michigan*		Yost Ice Arena • Ann Arbor, Michigan		W 5–1	5,124	1–1–0
October 18	7:30 PM	at #10 Michigan*		Yost Ice Arena • Ann Arbor, Michigan		L 1–2	5,371	1–2–0
October 25	7:00 PM	Colorado College*		Whittemore Center • Durham, New Hampshire	FCS	W 6–2	6,501	2–2–0
October 31	7:00 PM	#8 UMass Lowell		Whittemore Center • Durham, New Hampshire	FCS	L 0–2	5,011	2–3–0 (0–1–0)
November 1	7:00 PM	at #8 UMass Lowell		Tsongas Center • Lowell, Massachusetts		L 2–8	4,543	2–4–0 (0–2–0)
November 7	7:00 PM	Michigan State*		Whittemore Center • Durham, New Hampshire	FCS	L 3–4	5,620	2–5–0
November 8	7:00 PM	Michigan State		Whittemore Center • Durham, New Hampshire	FCS	W 5–2	6,020	3–5–0
November 14	7:00 PM	Northeastern		Whittemore Center • Durham, New Hampshire		W 5–3	5,061	4–5–0 (1–2–0)
November 15	7:00 PM	at Northeastern		Matthews Arena • Boston, Massachusetts		L 1–2	3,648	4–6–0 (1–3–0)
November 22	5:00 PM	#19 Providence		Whittemore Center • Durham, New Hampshire		L 0–1	6,005	4–7–0 (1–4–0)
November 25	7:00 PM	RPI*		Whittemore Center • Durham, New Hampshire		L 1–2	4,112	4–8–0
December 5	8:00 PM	#17 Boston College		Whittemore Center • Durham, New Hampshire	NBCSN	T 2–2 ^{OT}	6,263	4–8–1 (1–4–1)
December 6	7:00 PM	at #17 Boston College		Kelley Rink • Chestnut Hill, Massachusetts		L 2–4	4,589	4–9–1 (1–5–1)
December 12	7:00 PM	vs. Maine*		Verizon Wireless Arena • Manchester, New Hampshire		L 2–5	5,028	4–10–1
December 13	7:30 PM	vs. Maine*		Cross Insurance Arena • Portland, Maine		W 7–4	6,183	5–10–1
December 30	8:00 PM	at #12 Omaha*		CenturyLink Center Omaha • Omaha, Nebraska		L 1–2 ^{OT}	4,094	5–11–1
December 31	5:00 PM	at #12 Omaha*		CenturyLink Center Omaha • Omaha, Nebraska		W 6–2	4,074	6–11–1
January 9	7:30 PM	Dartmouth*		Whittemore Center • Durham, New Hampshire	NBCSN	T 2–2 ^{OT}	4,936	6–11–2
January 13	7:00 PM	#14 Providence		Whittemore Center • Durham, New Hampshire	FCS	W 2–1	3,005	7–11–2 (2–5–1)
January 16	7:00 PM	at UMass		Mullins Center • Amherst, Massachusetts		L 4–6	2,246	7–12–2 (2–6–1)
January 17	6:30 PM	UMass		Whittemore Center • Durham, New Hampshire	NBCSN	W 5–2	5,021	8–12–2 (3–6–1)
January 23	7:00 PM	at Maine		Alfond Arena • Orono, Maine		L 4–6	5,084	8–13–2 (3–7–1)
January 24	7:00 PM	Maine		Whittemore Center • Durham, New Hampshire	FCS	L 0–4	6,501	8–14–2 (3–8–1)
January 30	7:30 PM	at Notre Dame		Compton Family Ice Arena • Notre Dame, Indiana		W 5–2	5,188	9–14–2 (4–8–1)
January 31	6:30 PM	at Notre Dame		Compton Family Ice Arena • Notre Dame, Indiana	NBCSN	L 3–5	4,891	9–15–2 (4–9–1)
February 6	7:00 PM	at #17 Vermont		Gutterson Fieldhouse • Burlington, Vermont		L 2–5	3,810	9–16–2 (4–10–1)
February 7	7:00 PM	at #17 Vermont		Gutterson Fieldhouse • Burlington, Vermont		W 6–3	4,007	10–16–2 (5–10–1)
February 13	7:00 PM	at #3 Boston University		Agganis Arena • Boston, Massachusetts	NESN	L 3–6	4,596	10–17–2 (5–11–1)
February 14	7:00 PM	#3 Boston University		Whittemore Center • Durham, New Hampshire		W 4–3	4,896	11–17–2 (6–11–1)
February 20	7:00 PM	at Connecticut		XL Center • Hartford, Connecticut		W 4–1	6,887	12–17–2 (7–11–1)
February 21	7:00 PM	Connecticut		Whittemore Center • Durham, New Hampshire		W 5–1	4,914	13–17–2 (8–11–1)
February 27	7:00 PM	Merrimack		Whittemore Center • Durham, New Hampshire		W 4–1	3,955	14–17–2 (9–11–1)
February 28	7:00 PM	Merrimack		Whittemore Center • Durham, New Hampshire		W 3–0	5,586	15–17–2 (10–11–1)
Postseason
March 6	7:00 PM	Connecticut*		Whittemore Center • Durham, New Hampshire (Hockey East First Round)		W 5–2	3,412	16–17–2
March 7	7:00 PM	Connecticut*		Whittemore Center • Durham, New Hampshire (Hockey East First Round)		W 2–0	4,256	17–17–2
March 13	7:00 PM	at #10 Providence*		Schneider Arena • Providence, Rhode Island (Hockey East Quarterfinal)		W 2–1 ^{OT}	1,325	18–17–2
March 14	7:00 PM	at #10 Providence*		Schneider Arena • Providence, Rhode Island (Hockey East Quarterfinal)		L 1–2	1,877	18–18–2
March 15	7:30 PM	at #10 Providence*		Schneider Arena • Providence, Rhode Island (Hockey East Quarterfinal)		W 2–1 ^{OT}	1,905	19–18–2
March 20	8:00 PM	vs. #3 Boston University*		TD Garden • Boston, Massachusetts (Hockey East Semifinal)	NBCSN	L 1–4	13,263	19–19–2
*Non-conference game. ^{#}Rankings from USCHO.com Poll. All times are in Eastern Time.

== Rankings ==
Poll	Week																							
Poll	Pre	1	2	3	4	5	6	7	8	9	10	11	12	13	14	15	16	17	18	19	20	21	22	23 (Final)
USCHO.com	19	RV	RV	RV	NR	NR	NR	NR	NR	NR	NR	NR	NR	NR	NR	NR	NR	NR	NR	NR	NR	RV	NR	
USA Today	RV	NR	RV	RV	NR	NR	NR	NR	NR	NR	NR	NR	NR	NR	NR	NR	NR	NR	NR	NR	NR	RV	NR	
