= 2014–15 UConn Huskies men's ice hockey season =

- Conference: Hockey East
- Home ice: XL Center

Record
- Overall: 10–19–7 (7–11–4 HEA)
- Home: 5–6–3
- Road: 3–11–3
- Neutral: 2–2–1

Coaches and captains
- Head coach: Mike Cavanaugh
- Assistant coaches: Michael Souza; Joe Pereira; Andrew Raycroft

The 2014–15 UConn Huskies men's ice hockey team represented the University of Connecticut in the 2014–15 NCAA Division I men's ice hockey season. The team was coached by Mike Cavanaugh his second season behind the bench at UConn. The Huskies played their home games at the XL Center in downtown Hartford, Connecticut, competing in their first season in Hockey East.

== Personnel ==
=== Roster ===
As of October 5, 2014.

No.	Nat.	Player	Class	Pos	Height	Weight	DoB	Hometown	Previous team	NHL rights
1		Tom Comunale	Senior	G	5' 11" (1.8 m)	180 lb (82 kg)	1991-02-28	Seven Fields, Pennsylvania	St. Louis Bandits (NAHL)	—
2		Derek Pratt	Freshman	D	6' 1" (1.85 m)	185 lb (84 kg)	1994-03-12	Mount Hermon, Massachusetts	Waterloo Black Hawks (USHL)	—
3		Ryan Segalla	Sophomore	D	5' 1" (1.55 m)	197 lb (89 kg)	1994-12-29	Rockland, Massachusetts	Salisbury (USHS–CT)	PIT, 119th overall 2013
4		Kyle Husson	Junior	D	6' 5" (1.96 m)	215 lb (98 kg)	1991-10-31	Parker, Colorado	Wenatchee Wild (NAHL)	—
5		Jacob Poe	Senior	D	6' 3" (1.91 m)	210 lb (95 kg)	1990-12-17	Arlington, Texas	Topeka RoadRunners (NAHL)	—
6		Johnny Austin	Freshman	D	5' 9" (1.75 m)	195 lb (88 kg)	1995-07-22	St. Louis Park, Minnesota	Benilde-St. Margaret's (USHS–MN)	—
7		Joona Kunnas	Sophomore	D	6' 3" (1.91 m)	195 lb (88 kg)	1993-01-08	Vantaa, Finland	Middlesex Islanders (USPHL)	—
8		Spencer Naas	Freshman	F	5' 10" (1.78 m)	185 lb (84 kg)	1995-06-28	Minnetonka, Minnesota	Benilde-St. Margaret's (USHS–MN)	—
9		Shawn Pauly	Junior	F	6' 0" (1.83 m)	188 lb (85 kg)	1992-05-07	Bellingham, Washington	Wenatchee Wild (NAHL)	—
10		Jesse Schwartz	Freshman	F	6' 0" (1.83 m)	180 lb (82 kg)	1994-04-14	Toronto, Ontario	Victoria Grizzlies (BCHL)	—
11		Corey Ronan	Freshman	F	5' 7" (1.7 m)	175 lb (79 kg)	1995-10-06	Franklin, Massachusetts	Saint Sebastian's (USHS–MA)	—
13		Brent Norris	Sophomore	F	5' 9" (1.75 m)	190 lb (86 kg)	1993-06-18	Ottawa, Ontario	Nepean Raiders (CCHL)	—
14		Will Golonka	Freshman	F	5' 11" (1.8 m)	170 lb (77 kg)	1995-02-02	Carlisle, Massachusetts	Belmont Hill School (USHS–MA)	—
15		Brad Smith	Senior	F	5' 10" (1.78 m)	179 lb (81 kg)	1991-03-28	Trenton, Michigan	St. Louis Bandits (NAHL)	—
17		Ryan Tyson (C)	Senior	F	5' 9" (1.75 m)	187 lb (85 kg)	1991-08-14	Harleysville, Pennsylvania	New Hampshire Junior Monarchs (EJHL)	—
18		Trevor Gerling (A)	Senior	F	6' 0" (1.83 m)	200 lb (91 kg)	1990-06-30	Seattle, Washington	Langley Chiefs (BCHL)	—
19		Evan Richardson	Sophomore	F	5' 8" (1.73 m)	175 lb (79 kg)	1994-05-30	Nanaimo, British Columbia	Boston College (HEA)	—
21		Jeff Wight	Freshman	F	6' 2" (1.88 m)	195 lb (88 kg)	1995-12-04	Coquitlam, British Columbia	Merritt Centennials (BCHL)	—
22		David Drake	Freshman	D	6' 4" (1.93 m)	181 lb (82 kg)	1995-01-07	Naperville, Illinois	Des Moines Buccaneers (USHL)	PHI, 192nd overall 2013
23		Kasperi Ojantakanen	Freshman	F	5' 11" (1.8 m)	170 lb (77 kg)	1995-01-12	Helsinki, Finland	Jokerit U20 (Jr. A SM-Liiga)	—
24		Patrick Kirtland (A)	Junior	F	6' 0" (1.83 m)	195 lb (88 kg)	1991-01-22	Rocky Hill, Connecticut	Des Moines Buccaneers (USHL)	—
27		Cody Sharib	Senior	F	6' 2" (1.88 m)	210 lb (95 kg)	1990-08-23	Needham, Massachusetts	New Hampshire Junior Monarchs (EJHL)	—
28		Joey Ferriss	Junior	F	6' 1" (1.85 m)	185 lb (84 kg)	1992-12-28	Novi, Michigan	Michigan Warriors (NAHL)	—
31		Rob Nichols	Sophomore	G	5' 11" (1.8 m)	180 lb (82 kg)	1992-09-10	Dallas, Texas	Wenatchee Wild (NAHL)	—
33		Tyler Cooke	Junior	D	6' 1" (1.85 m)	200 lb (91 kg)	1992-04-28	Warwick, Rhode Island	South Shore Kings (EJHL)	—
35		Steve Thulin	Freshman	G	6' 3" (1.91 m)	170 lb (77 kg)	1993-02-02	North Reading, Massachusetts	Connecticut Junior Rangers (USPHL)	—

=== Coaching staff ===
Name	Position	Seasons at UConn	Alma mater
Mike Cavanaugh	Head Coach	2	Bowdoin College (1990)
Michael Souza	Associate head coach	2	University of New Hampshire (2000)
Joe Pereira	Assistant coach	2	Boston University (2011)
Andrew Raycroft	Assistant coach	1	

== Standings ==
2014–15 Hockey East men's standings
	Conference record							Overall record					
	GP	W	L	T	PTS	GF	GA	GP	W	L	T	GF	GA
#2 Boston University †*	22	14	5	3	31	88	55	41	28	8	5	158	95
#1 Providence	22	13	8	1	27	61	37	41	26	13	2	123	84
#13 Boston College	22	12	7	3	27	60	50	38	21	14	3	107	91
#17 Massachusetts–Lowell	22	11	7	4	26	70	52	39	21	12	6	134	101
Notre Dame	22	10	7	5	25	64	54	42	18	19	5	126	116
Northeastern	22	11	9	2	24	70	69	36	16	16	4	107	107
Vermont	22	10	9	3	23	62	53	41	22	15	4	110	91
New Hampshire	22	10	11	1	21	66	68	40	19	19	2	119	109
Connecticut	22	7	11	4	18	42	74	36	10	19	7	66	111
Maine	22	8	12	2	18	64	74	39	14	22	3	108	127
Merrimack	22	5	14	3	13	38	56	38	16	18	4	81	93
Massachusetts	22	5	16	1	11	59	102	36	11	23	2	99	152
Championship: March 21, 2015 † indicates conference regular season champion; * indicates conference tournament champion Rankings: USCHO.com Top 20 Poll; updated March 9, 2015

== Schedule ==
=== Regular season ===
Date	Time	Opponent^{#}	Rank^{#}	Site	TV	Result	Attendance	Record
Exhibition
October 5	2:05 pm	Dalhousie*		Mark Edward Freitas Ice Forum • Storrs, Connecticut		W 3–1	759	0–0–0
Regular Season
October 10	7:00 pm	at Penn State*		Pegula Ice Arena • University Park, Pennsylvania		T 2–2 ^{OT}	6,017	0–0–1
October 11	3:00 pm	at Penn State*		Pegula Ice Arena • University Park, Pennsylvania		L 1–7	6,016	0–1–1
October 18	7:00 pm	at Merrimack		J. Thom Lawler Arena • North Andover, Massachusetts	ESPN3	L 1–2 ^{OT}	2,549	0–2–1 (0–1–0)
October 21	7:00 pm	vs. #15 Quinnipiac*		Webster Bank Arena • Bridgeport, Connecticut		W 4–1	1,435	1–2–1
October 25	7:00 pm	at #17 Vermont		Gutterson Fieldhouse • Burlington, Vermont		L 1–2	4,007	1–3–1 (0–2–0)
October 31	4:30 pm	vs. Merrimack*		Prudential Center • Newark, New Jersey (Liberty Hockey Invitational)		T 2–2 ^{OT}	2,113	1–3–2
November 1	4:00 pm	vs. Yale*		Prudential Center • Newark, New Jersey (Liberty Hockey Invitational)		L 1–2	2,987	1–4–2
November 5	7:05 pm	#3 Boston College		XL Center • Hartford, Connecticut		W 1–0	8,089	2–4–2 (1–2–0)
November 8	7:00 pm	at #5 Boston University		Agganis Arena • Boston, Massachusetts		T 4–4 ^{OT}	4,658	2–4–3 (1–2–1)
November 14	7:05 pm	Sacred Heart*		The Taft School • Watertown, Connecticut		L 0–2	850	2–5–3
November 18	7:05 pm	RPI*		XL Center • Hartford, Connecticut		T 1–1 ^{OT}	3,879	2–5–4
November 21	5:35 pm	#11 Vermont		XL Center • Hartford, Connecticut		W 2–1	5,072	3–5–4 (2–2–1)
November 22	3:35 pm	#3 Boston University		XL Center • Hartford, Connecticut		L 2–5	7,712	3–6–4 (2–3–1)
November 29	4:00 pm	at Brown*		Meehan Auditorium • Providence, Rhode Island		L 0–1	956	3–7–4
December 3	7:00 pm	at #7 UMass Lowell		Tsongas Center • Lowell, Massachusetts		L 4–6	3,680	3–8–4 (2–4–1)
December 27	6:00 pm	vs. Union*		Webster Bank Arena • Bridgeport, Connecticut (Frozen Holiday Classic)		W 3–2	3,570	4–8–4
December 28	6:00 pm	vs. #9 UMass Lowell*		Webster Bank Arena • Bridgeport, Connecticut (Frozen Holiday Classic)	CPTV	L 1–3	1,483	4–9–4
January 2	7:00 pm	at UMass		Mullins Center • Amherst, Massachusetts		W 4–3	2,838	5–9–4 (3–4–1)
January 6	7:05 pm	Colorado College*		Webster Bank Arena • Bridgeport, Connecticut		L 1–4	3,417	5–10–4
January 9	7:05 pm	at Army*		Tate Rink • West Point, New York		W 6–3	2,308	6–10–4
January 10	7:05 pm	#6 UMass Lowell		XL Center • Hartford, Connecticut		W 2–0	6,855	7–10–4 (4–4–2)
January 16	7:35 pm	at Notre Dame		Compton Family Center • South Bend, Indiana	NBCSN	T 3–3 ^{OT}	5,202	7–10–5 (4–4–2)
January 18	2:05 pm	Notre Dame		Webster Bank Arena • Bridgeport, Connecticut		L 1–6	4,157	7–11–5 (4–5–2)
January 24	7:00 pm	at #19 Boston College		Kelley Rink • Chestnut Hill, Massachusetts		L 2–3	6,815	7–12–5 (4–6–2)
January 30	7:00 pm	at Maine		Alfond Arena • Orono, Maine		W 2–1 ^{OT}	3,717	8–12–5 (5–6–2)
February 1	2:05 pm	Maine		XL Center • Hartford, Connecticut		W 2–2 ^{OT}	5,211	8–12–6 (5–6–3)
February 4	7:05 pm	#12 Providence		XL Center • Hartford, Connecticut		T 2–2 ^{ot}	4,672	8–12–7 (5–6–4)
February 7	7:00 pm	at #12 Providence		Schneider Arena • Providence, Rhode Island		L 1–10	3,033	8–13–7 (5–7–4)
February 10	7:05 pm	Merrimack		XL Center • Hartford, Connecticut		W 1–0	4,194	9–13–7 (5–7–4)
February 13	7:00 pm	at Northeastern		Matthews Arena • Boston, Massachusetts		L 0–9	2,308	9–14–7 (5–8–4)
February 14	3:35 pm	Northeastern		XL Center • Hartford, Connecticut		L 1–6	5,086	9–15–7 (6–9–4)
February 20	7:05 pm	New Hampshire		XL Center • Hartford, Connecticut		L 1–4	6,887	9–16–7 (6–10–4)
February 21	7:00 pm	at New Hampshire		Whittemore Center • Durham, New Hampshire	NESN	L 1–6	4,914	9–17–7 (6–11–4)
February 27	7:05 pm	UMass		XL Center • Hartford, Connecticut		W 4–0	6,298	10–17–7 (7–11–4)
Hockey East Tournament
March 6	7:00 pm	at New Hampshire		Whittemore Center • Durham, New Hampshire		L 2–5	3,412	10–18–7
March 7	7:00 pm	at New Hampshire		Whittemore Center • Durham, New Hampshire		L 0–2	4,256	10–19–7
*Non-conference game. ^{#}Rankings from USCHO.com Poll. All times are in Eastern Time.

== Rankings ==
Poll	Week																								
Poll	Pre	1	2	3	4	5	6	7	8	9	10	11	12	13	14	15	16	17	18	19	20	21	22	23	24 (Final)
USCHO.com	NR	NR	NR	NR	NR	RV	NR	NR	NR	NR	NR	NR	NR	NR	NR	NR	NR	NR	NR	NR	NR	NR	NR	NR	NR
USA Today	NR	NR	NR	NR	NR	RV	NR	NR	NR	NR	NR	NR	NR	NR	NR	NR	NR	NR	NR	NR	NR	NR	NR	NR	NR
