= 2014–15 Merrimack Warriors men's ice hockey season =

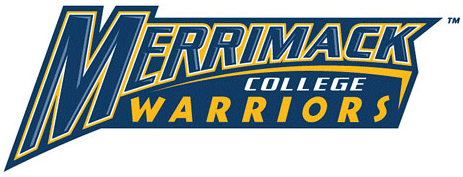
- Conference: Hockey East
- Home ice: Lawler Arena

Record
- Overall: 16–18–4 (5–14–3 HEA)
- Home: 9–4–2
- Road: 6–13–1
- Neutral: 1–1–1

Coaches and captains
- Head coach: Mark Dennehy
- Assistant coaches: Curtis Carr; Bill Gilligan

The 2014–15 Merrimack Warriors men's ice hockey team represented Merrimack College during the 2014–15 NCAA Division I men's ice hockey season. The team was coached by Mark Dennehy, in his 10th season with the Warriors. The Warriors played their home games at Lawler Arena on campus in North Andover, Massachusetts, competing in Hockey East. The Warriors finished the season with a record of 16–18–4, 5–14–3 in Hockey East play to finish in 11th place. The qualified for the 2015 Hockey East Men's Ice Hockey Tournament, where they were eliminated in the quarterfinals by Boston University.

== Personnel ==
=== Roster ===
As of December 1, 2014.

No.	Nat.	Player	Class	Pos	Height	Weight	DoB	Hometown	Previous team	NHL rights
1		Collin Delia	Freshman	G	6' 2" (1.88 m)	190 lb (86 kg)	1994-06-20	Rancho Cucamonga, California	Amarillo (NAHL)	—
2		Craig Wyszomirski	Junior	D	6' 4" (1.93 m)	220 lb (100 kg)	1992-09-21	Mahwah, New Jersey	Surrey (BCHL)	—
3		Aaron Titcomb	Freshman	D	6' 4" (1.93 m)	215 lb (98 kg)	1993-05-16	Charlestown, Massachusetts	Islanders (USPHL)	—
4		Marc Biega	Freshman	D	6' 0" (1.83 m)	185 lb (84 kg)	1994-06-06	Pointe-Claire, Quebec	Coquitlam (BCHL)	—
5		Sean Robertson	Junior	D	6' 1" (1.85 m)	195 lb (88 kg)	1991-02-28	Cobble Hill, British Columbia	Vernon (BCHL)	—
6		Braxton Bilous	Freshman	D	6' 1" (1.85 m)	195 lb (88 kg)	1994-05-02	Langley, British Columbia	Brooks (AJHL)	—
7		Jonathan Lashyn	Sophomore	D	5' 10" (1.78 m)	190 lb (86 kg)	1992-12-07	Saskatoon, Saskatchewan	Camrose (AJHL)	—
8		Brian Christie	Junior	F	6' 2" (1.88 m)	180 lb (82 kg)	1992-04-20	West Chester, Pennsylvania	Topeka (NAHL)	—
9		Jace Hennig	Freshman	F	5' 9" (1.75 m)	175 lb (79 kg)	1995-01-04	Port Moody, British Columbia	Coquitlam (BCHL)	—
10		Quinn Gould	Senior	F	6' 3" (1.91 m)	195 lb (88 kg)	1990-05-02	Fort McMurray, Alberta	Westside (BCHL)	—
11		Teddy McCarran	Freshman	F	6' 2" (1.88 m)	200 lb (91 kg)	1993-02-02	Derry, New Hampshire	Islanders (USPHL)	—
12		Vinny Scotti	Junior	F	5' 9" (1.75 m)	175 lb (79 kg)	1992-01-13	Vineland, New Jersey	Boston (EJHL)	—
13		Brett Seney	Freshman	F	5' 9" (1.75 m)	170 lb (77 kg)	1996-02-29	London, Ontario	Kingston (OJHL)	—
14		Kyle Singleton	Senior	F	6' 2" (1.88 m)	190 lb (86 kg)	1990-08-30	Beaverton, Oregon	Westside (BCHL)	—
15		Jared Kolquist	Freshman	D	5' 10" (1.78 m)	185 lb (84 kg)	1993-04-22	Hermantown, Minnesota	Lincoln (USHL)	—
16		Chris LeBlanc	Sophomore	F	6' 3" (1.91 m)	205 lb (93 kg)	1993-09-12	Winthrop, Massachusetts	South Shore (EJHL)	OTT, 161st overall 2013
17		Ben Bahe	Junior	F	5' 10" (1.78 m)	180 lb (82 kg)	1993-01-10	Stillwater, Minnesota	Topeka (NAHL)	—
18		Justin Hussar	Junior	F	6' 2" (1.88 m)	190 lb (86 kg)	1992-10-01	Lancaster, New York	Des Moines (USHL)	—
20		Hampus Gustafsson	Sophomore	F	6' 4" (1.93 m)	205 lb (93 kg)	1993-10-26	Ljungby, Sweden	Amarillo (NAHL)	—
21		Clayton Jardine	Senior	F	5' 10" (1.78 m)	170 lb (77 kg)	1991-03-04	Lacombe, Alberta	Camrose (AJHL)	—
22		Mathieu Tibbet	Freshman	F	6' 2" (1.88 m)	190 lb (86 kg)	1993-10-07	Dover, Delaware	Chilliwack (BCHL)	—
23		Alfred Larsson	Freshman	F	6' 5" (1.96 m)	210 lb (95 kg)	1993-06-11	Malmö, Sweden	Youngstown (USHL)	—
24		Matt Cronin	Junior	D	6' 3" (1.91 m)	215 lb (98 kg)	1992-05-21	Langley, British Columbia	Surrey (BCHL)	—
26		Dan Kolomatis (C)	Senior	D	6' 1" (1.85 m)	170 lb (77 kg)	1991-05-22	Basking Ridge, New Jersey	Tri-City (USHL)	—
27		Justin Mansfield (A)	Senior	D/F	6' 1" (1.85 m)	205 lb (93 kg)	1990-07-02	Arlington, Massachusetts	Boston (EJHL)	—
28		John Gustafsson	Junior	F	6' 1" (1.85 m)	185 lb (84 kg)	1992-01-05	Ljungby, Sweden	Amarillo (NAHL)	—
29		Joe Pantalone	Senior	G	5' 9" (1.75 m)	175 lb (79 kg)	1992-12-01	Hammonton, New Jersey	St. Augustine (USHS–NJ)	—
32		Rasmus Tirronen	Senior	G	6' 3" (1.91 m)	200 lb (91 kg)	1990-11-09	Espoo, Finland	Topeka (NAHL)	—

=== Coaching staff ===
Name	Position	Seasons at Merrimack	Alma mater
Mark Dennehy	Head coach	10	Boston College (1991)
Curtis Carr	Associate Head Coach	4	Kent State University (2003)
Bill Gilligan	Associate Head Coach	1	Brown University (1977)

== Standings ==
2014–15 Hockey East men's standings
	Conference record							Overall record					
	GP	W	L	T	PTS	GF	GA	GP	W	L	T	GF	GA
#2 Boston University †*	22	14	5	3	31	88	55	41	28	8	5	158	95
#1 Providence	22	13	8	1	27	61	37	41	26	13	2	123	84
#13 Boston College	22	12	7	3	27	60	50	38	21	14	3	107	91
#17 Massachusetts–Lowell	22	11	7	4	26	70	52	39	21	12	6	134	101
Notre Dame	22	10	7	5	25	64	54	42	18	19	5	126	116
Northeastern	22	11	9	2	24	70	69	36	16	16	4	107	107
Vermont	22	10	9	3	23	62	53	41	22	15	4	110	91
New Hampshire	22	10	11	1	21	66	68	40	19	19	2	119	109
Connecticut	22	7	11	4	18	42	74	36	10	19	7	66	111
Maine	22	8	12	2	18	64	74	39	14	22	3	108	127
Merrimack	22	5	14	3	13	38	56	38	16	18	4	81	93
Massachusetts	22	5	16	1	11	59	102	36	11	23	2	99	152
Championship: March 21, 2015 † indicates conference regular season champion; * indicates conference tournament champion Rankings: USCHO.com Top 20 Poll; updated March 9, 2015

== Schedule ==
Date	Time	Opponent^{#}	Rank^{#}	Site	TV	Result	Attendance	Record
Exhibition
October 5	3:00 PM	St. Francis Xavier*		Lawler Arena • North Andover, Massachusetts		T 2–2 ^{OT}	1,987	0–0–0
Regular Season
October 10	7:00 PM	at Holy Cross*		Hart Center • Worcester, Massachusetts		W 3–2	990	1–0–0
October 11	7:00 PM	Holy Cross*		Lawler Arena • North Andover, Massachusetts		W 2–1	2,229	2–0–0
October 18	7:00 PM	Connecticut		Lawler Arena • North Andover, Massachusetts	ESPN3	W 2–1 ^{OT}	2,549	3–0–0 (1–0–0)
October 24	7:00 PM	at Mercyhurst*		Mercyhurst Ice Center • Erie, Pennsylvania		W 5–4 ^{OT}	1,214	4–0–0
October 25	7:00 PM	at Mercyhurst*		Mercyhurst Ice Center • Erie, Pennsylvania		L 2–3	958	4–1–0
October 31	4:30 PM	vs. Connecticut*		Prudential Center • Newark, New Jersey (Liberty Invitational)		T 2–2 ^{OT}	2,113	4–1–1
November 2	1:00 PM	vs. Princeton*		Prudential Center • Newark, New Jersey (Liberty Invitational)		W 6–1	2,987	5–1–1
November 7	7:00 PM	at #12 Providence		Schneider Arena • Providence, Rhode Island		L 2–3	2,647	5–2–1 (1–1–0)
November 8	7:00 PM	#12 Providence		Lawler Arena • North Andover, Massachusetts		W 1–0	2,549	6–2–1 (2–1–0)
November 14	7:00 PM	Notre Dame		Lawler Arena • North Andover, Massachusetts		L 2–3 ^{OT}	2,549	6–3–1 (2–2–0)
November 15	7:00 PM	Notre Dame		Lawler Arena • North Andover, Massachusetts		W 4–1	2,549	7–3–1 (3–2–0)
November 21	7:00 PM	Northeastern		Lawler Arena • North Andover, Massachusetts		W 4–2	2,411	8–3–1 (4–2–0)
November 22	7:00 PM	at Northeastern		Matthews Arena • Boston, Massachusetts		L 1–3	2,010	8–4–1 (4–3–0)
November 28	4:00 PM	Clarkson*		Lawler Arena • North Andover, Massachusetts		W 3–0	2,158	9–4–1
November 29	4:00 PM	Clarkson*		Lawler Arena • North Andover, Massachusetts		W 2–1	2,145	10–4–1
December 5	7:00 PM	#3 Boston University	#18	Lawler Arena • North Andover, Massachusetts	ESPN3	T 1–1 ^{OT}	2,549	10–4–2 (4–3–1)
December 6	7:00 PM	at #3 Boston University	#18	Agganis Arena • Boston, Massachusetts		L 2–4	4,366	10–5–2 (4–4–1)
January 2	8:00 PM	at #8 Minnesota*	#18	Mariucci Arena • Minneapolis, Minnesota (Mariucci Classic)	FSN+	W 3–2	9,866	11–5–2
January 3	5:00 PM	vs. #9 UMass Lowell*	#18	Mariucci Arena • Minneapolis, Minnesota (Mariucci Classic)		L 1–3	9,790	11–6–2
January 16	7:00 PM	#12 Quinnipiac*	#20	Lawler Arena • North Andover, Massachusetts		W 4–3	2,549	12–6–2
January 17	7:00 PM	at #12 Quinnipiac*	#20	TD Bank Sports Center • Hamden, Connecticut		W 3–1	3,337	13–6–2
January 21	7:00 PM	at #19 Boston College	#14	Kelley Rink • Chestnut Hill, Massachusetts	NESN	L 1–2	4,188	13–7–2 (4–5–1)
January 23	7:00 PM	UMass	#14	Lawler Arena • North Andover, Massachusetts		T 4–4 ^{OT}	2,291	13–7–3 (4–5–2)
January 25	7:00 PM	at UMass	#14	Mullins Center • Amherst, Massachusetts		L 1–4	1,224	13–8–3 (4–6–2)
January 30	7:00 PM	#10 UMass Lowell	#19	Lawler Arena • North Andover, Massachusetts	ESPN3	W 2–1	2,549	14–8–3 (5–6–2)
January 31	7:00 PM	at #10 UMass Lowell	#19	Tsongas Center • Lowell, Massachusetts		L 1–4	6,351	14–9–3 (5–7–2)
February 6	7:00 PM	#11 Boston College	#18	Lawler Arena • North Andover, Massachusetts		L 2–4	2,549	14–10–3 (5–8–2)
February 10	7:00 PM	at Connecticut		XL Center • Hartford, Connecticut		L 0–1	4,194	14–11–3 (5–9–2)
February 13	7:00 PM	Maine		Lawler Arena • North Andover, Massachusetts		L 3–4	2,374	14–12–3 (5–10–2)
February 14	7:00 PM	Maine		Lawler Arena • North Andover, Massachusetts		L 3–5	2,095	14–13–3 (5–11–2)
February 20	7:00 PM	at #18 Vermont		Gutterson Fieldhouse • Burlington, Vermont		L 1–2	3,867	14–14–3 (5–12–2)
February 21	7:00 PM	at #18 Vermont		Gutterson Fieldhouse • Burlington, Vermont		T 0–0 ^{OT}	4,007	14–14–4 (5–12–3)
February 27	7:30 PM	at New Hampshire		Whittemore Center • Durham, New Hampshire		L 1–4	3,955	14–15–4 (5–13–3)
February 28	5:00 PM	at New Hampshire		Whittemore Center • Durham, New Hampshire		L 0–3	5,586	14–16–4 (5–14–3)
Postseason
March 6	7:00 PM	at Northeastern*		Matthews Arena • Boston, Massachusetts (Hockey East First Round)		W 3–2 ^{OT}	1,826	15–16–4
March 7	4:00 PM	at Northeastern*		Matthews Arena • Boston, Massachusetts (Hockey East First Round)		W 2–1 ^{2OT}	1,519	16–16–4
March 13	7:00 PM	at #3 Boston University*		Agganis Arena • Boston, Massachusetts (Hockey East Quarterfinal)		L 2–6	2,612	16–17–4
March 14	4:00 PM	at #3 Boston University*		Agganis Arena • Boston, Massachusetts (Hockey East Quarterfinal)		L 0–5	3,069	16–18–4
*Non-conference game. ^{#}Rankings from USCHO.com Poll. All times are in Eastern Time.

== Rankings ==
Poll	Week																							
Poll	Pre	1	2	3	4	5	6	7	8	9	10	11	12	13	14	15	16	17	18	19	20	21	22	23 (Final)
USCHO.com	NR	RV	RV	RV	RV	RV	RV	RV	18	19	18	18	20	14	19	18	RV	RV	RV	NR	NR	NR	NR	NR
USA Today	NR	NR	RV	NR	RV	RV	RV	RV	RV	RV	RV	RV	RV	15	RV	RV	NR	NR	NR	NR	NR	NR	NR	NR
