= 2014–15 UMass Lowell River Hawks men's ice hockey season =

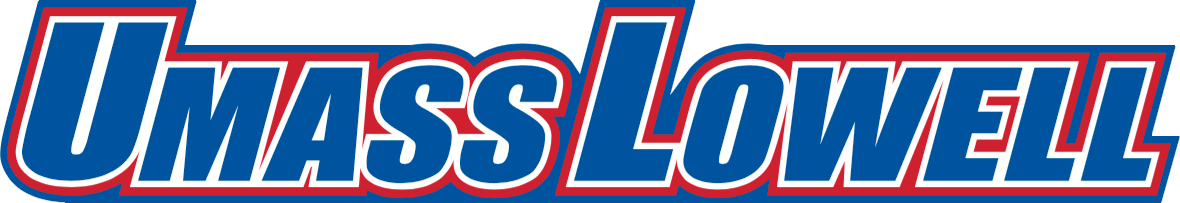

Frozen Holiday Classic Champions Mariucci Classic Champions
- Conference: Hockey East
- Home ice: Tsongas Center

Rankings
- USCHO.com: #14
- USA Today: #15

Record
- Overall: 21–12–6 (11–7–4 HEA)
- Home: 12–6–2
- Road: 4–5–4
- Neutral: 5–1–0

Coaches and captains
- Head coach: Norm Bazin
- Assistant coaches: Jason Lammers; Cam Ellsworth
- Captain: Zack Kamrass

The 2014–15 UMass Lowell River Hawks men's ice hockey team represented the University of Massachusetts Lowell during the 2014–15 NCAA Division I men's ice hockey season. The team was coached by Norm Bazin, in his fourth season at UMass Lowell. The River Hawks played their home games at the Tsongas Center on campus in Lowell, Massachusetts, competing in Hockey East.

== Personnel ==
=== Roster ===
As of November 9, 2014.

No.	Nat.	Player	Class	Pos	Height	Weight	DoB	Hometown	Previous team	NHL rights
1		Jeff Smith	Freshman	G	6' 1" (1.85 m)	190 lb (86 kg)	1995-10-03	Maple Ridge, British Columbia	Powell River (BCHL)	—
2		Tommy Panico	Freshman	D	6' 1" (1.85 m)	185 lb (84 kg)	1995-03-24	Wall, New Jersey	Muskegon (USHL)	—
3		Michael Kapla	Sophomore	D	5' 11" (1.8 m)	194 lb (88 kg)	1994-09-19	Eau Claire, Wisconsin	Sioux City (USHL)	—
4		Chris Forney	Freshman	D	6' 2" (1.88 m)	174 lb (79 kg)	1994-11-20	Thief River Falls, Minnesota	Langley (BCHL)	—
6		Tyler Mayea	Freshman	D	6' 3" (1.91 m)	196 lb (89 kg)	1993-08-10	Burlington, Ontario	Trenton (OJHL)	—
5		Joseph Gambardella	Sophomore	F	5' 9" (1.75 m)	175 lb (79 kg)	1993-12-01	Staten Island, New York	Des Moines (USHL)	—
7		Tyler Mueller	Freshman	D	6' 1" (1.85 m)	174 lb (79 kg)	1994-06-13	Regina, Saskatchewan	Sioux City (USHL)	—
8		Evan Campbell	Sophomore	F	6' 2" (1.88 m)	190 lb (86 kg)	1993-03-01	Port Coquitlam, British Columbia	Langley (BCHL)	EDM, 128th overall 2013
9		Terrence Wallin	Senior	F	6' 0" (1.83 m)	180 lb (82 kg)	1992-04-06	Yardley, Pennsylvania	Gunnery (USHS–CT)	—
10		Ryan McGrath	Junior	F	5' 7" (1.7 m)	160 lb (73 kg)	1991-07-13	O'Fallon, Missouri	Cedar Rapids (USHL)	—
11		Dylan Hollman	Freshman	F	6' 1" (1.85 m)	185 lb (84 kg)	1994-01-15	Red Deer, Alberta	Spruce Grove (AJHL)	—
12		Gage Hough	Freshman	F	6' 0" (1.83 m)	201 lb (91 kg)	1993-03-27	Omaha, Nebraska	Omaha (USHL)	—
13		Adam Chapie	Junior	F	6' 1" (1.85 m)	175 lb (79 kg)	1991-07-06	Oxford, Michigan	New Mexico (NAHL)	—
14		Lucas Kohls	Freshman	D	6' 3" (1.91 m)	196 lb (89 kg)	1993-07-23	Forest Lake, Minnesota	Austin (NAHL)	—
15		Michael Louria	Freshman	F	5' 11" (1.8 m)	170 lb (77 kg)	1994-03-13	Gibraltar, Michigan	Minot (NAHL)	—
16		Robert Francis	Junior (RS)	F	5' 8" (1.73 m)	175 lb (79 kg)	1991-01-04	San Diego, California	Western Michigan (NCHC)	—
17		Chris Maniccia	Sophomore	F	5' 10" (1.78 m)	162 lb (73 kg)	1994-05-12	St. Catharines, Ontario	Smiths Falls (CCHL)	—
18		A.J. White	Junior	F	6' 2" (1.88 m)	180 lb (82 kg)	1992-04-19	Dearborn, Michigan	Michigan (NAHL)	—
19		C.J. Smith	Freshman	F	5' 11" (1.8 m)	183 lb (83 kg)	1994-12-01	Des Moines, Iowa	Chicago (USHL)	—
20		Jake Suter	Senior	D	6' 1" (1.85 m)	200 lb (91 kg)	1990-09-22	Lac du Flambeau, Wisconsin	Sioux City (USHL)	—
21		Jake Kamrass	Freshman	F	6' 0" (1.83 m)	161 lb (73 kg)	1994-03-28	Atlanta, Georgia	Topeka (NAHL)	—
22		Ryan Collins	Freshman	F	6' 1" (1.85 m)	194 lb (88 kg)	1993-09-23	Newton, Massachusetts	Ottawa (CCHL)	—
23		Michael Fallon	Junior	F	5' 11" (1.8 m)	175 lb (79 kg)	1991-06-08	Glenview, Illinois	Chicago (USHL)	—
24		Michael Colantone	Junior	F	5' 11" (1.8 m)	190 lb (86 kg)	1991-11-13	Cave Creek, Arizona	Prince George (BCHL)	—
25		Dylan Zink	Sophomore	D	6' 0" (1.83 m)	175 lb (79 kg)	1992-10-08	Monona, Wisconsin	Jamestown (NAHL)	—
27		Zack Kamrass (C)	Senior	D	5' 11" (1.8 m)	185 lb (84 kg)	1990-12-14	Atlanta, Georgia	Sioux Falls (USHL)	—
29		John Edwardh	Freshman	F	5' 11" (1.8 m)	170 lb (77 kg)	1995-02-03	Calgary, Alberta	Okotoks (AJHL)	—
31		Olli Kälkäjä	Freshman	G	6' 4" (1.93 m)	190 lb (86 kg)	1993-03-13	Oulu, Finland	Rio Grande Valley (NAHL)	—
33		Kevin Boyle	Junior (RS)	G	6' 1" (1.85 m)	201 lb (91 kg)	1992-05-30	Manalapan, New Jersey	UMass (HEA)	—

=== Coaching staff ===
Name	Position	Seasons at UMass Lowell	Alma mater
Norm Bazin	Head Coach	4	University of Massachusetts Lowell (1999)
Jason Lammers	Associate head coach	3	State University of New York at Geneseo (1998)
Cam Ellsworth	Assistant coach	3	Michigan Technological University (2005)

== Standings ==
2014–15 Hockey East men's standings
	Conference record							Overall record					
	GP	W	L	T	PTS	GF	GA	GP	W	L	T	GF	GA
#2 Boston University †*	22	14	5	3	31	88	55	41	28	8	5	158	95
#1 Providence	22	13	8	1	27	61	37	41	26	13	2	123	84
#13 Boston College	22	12	7	3	27	60	50	38	21	14	3	107	91
#17 Massachusetts–Lowell	22	11	7	4	26	70	52	39	21	12	6	134	101
Notre Dame	22	10	7	5	25	64	54	42	18	19	5	126	116
Northeastern	22	11	9	2	24	70	69	36	16	16	4	107	107
Vermont	22	10	9	3	23	62	53	41	22	15	4	110	91
New Hampshire	22	10	11	1	21	66	68	40	19	19	2	119	109
Connecticut	22	7	11	4	18	42	74	36	10	19	7	66	111
Maine	22	8	12	2	18	64	74	39	14	22	3	108	127
Merrimack	22	5	14	3	13	38	56	38	16	18	4	81	93
Massachusetts	22	5	16	1	11	59	102	36	11	23	2	99	152
Championship: March 21, 2015 † indicates conference regular season champion; * indicates conference tournament champion Rankings: USCHO.com Top 20 Poll; updated March 9, 2015

== Schedule ==
Date	Time	Opponent^{#}	Rank^{#}	Site	TV	Result	Attendance	Record
Exhibition
October 5	4:00 PM	St. Thomas*	#17	Tsongas Center • Lowell, Massachusetts		W 7–3	2,041	0–0–0
Regular Season
October 10	7:00 PM	#4 Boston College	#17	Tsongas Center • Lowell, Massachusetts	NESN	W 5–2	7,326	1–0–0 (1–0–0)
October 17	7:00 PM	#13 Quinnipiac*	#9	Tsongas Center • Lowell, Massachusetts		W 6–3	4,329	2–0–0
October 18	7:00 PM	at #13 Quinnipiac*	#9	TD Bank Sports Center • Hamden, Connecticut		T 3–3 ^{OT}	3,525	2–0–1
October 24	7:00 PM	#14 Michigan*	#7	Tsongas Center • Lowell, Massachusetts	NESN	L 4–8	6,752	2–1–1
October 25	7:00 PM	Michigan State*	#7	Tsongas Center • Lowell, Massachusetts		W 2–1	5,335	3–1–1
October 31	7:30 PM	at New Hampshire	#8	Whittemore Center • Durham, New Hampshire	FCS	W 2–0	5,011	4–1–1 (2–0–0)
November 1	7:00 PM	New Hampshire	#8	Tsongas Center • Lowell, Massachusetts		W 8–2	4,543	5–1–1 (3–0–0)
November 7	7:15 PM	Northeastern	#6	Tsongas Center • Lowell, Massachusetts		T 3–3 ^{OT}	4,819	5–1–2 (3–0–1)
November 8	7:00 PM	at Northeastern	#6	Matthews Arena • Boston, Massachusetts		W 5–0	2,710	6–1–2 (4–0–1)
November 14	7:15 PM	Penn State*	#4	Tsongas Center • Lowell, Massachusetts		W 5–3	4,313	7–1–2
November 15	7:00 PM	Penn State*	#4	Tsongas Center • Lowell, Massachusetts		L 1–4	4,548	7–2–2
November 20	7:35 PM	at Notre Dame	#5	Compton Family Ice Arena • Notre Dame, Indiana		W 3–1	3,636	8–2–2 (5–0–1)
November 21	7:35 PM	at Notre Dame	#5	Compton Family Ice Arena • Notre Dame, Indiana	NBCSN	T 2–2 ^{OT}	5,022	8–2–3 (5–0–2)
November 29	7:00 PM	#18 Harvard*	#4	Tsongas Center • Lowell, Massachusetts		L 2–4	4,951	8–3–3
December 3	7:00 PM	Connecticut	#7	Tsongas Center • Lowell, Massachusetts		W 6–4	3,680	9–3–3 (6–0–2)
December 6	8:00 PM	Maine	#7	Tsongas Center • Lowell, Massachusetts	NBCSN	W 3–2 ^{OT}	4,497	10–3–3 (7–0–2)
December 27	3:00 PM	vs. Sacred Heart*	#9	Webster Bank Arena • Bridgeport, Connecticut (Frozen Holiday Classic)		W 5–1	3,570	11–3–3
December 28	6:00 PM	vs. Connecticut*	#9	Webster Bank Arena • Bridgeport, Connecticut (Frozen Holiday Classic)		W 3–1	1,483	12–3–3
January 2	5:00 PM	vs. RIT*	#9	Mariucci Arena • Minneapolis, Minnesota (Mariucci Classic)		W 7–3	9,866	13–3–3
January 3	5:00 PM	vs. #18 Merrimack*	#9	Mariucci Arena • Minneapolis, Minnesota (Mariucci Classic)		W 3–1	9,790	14–3–3
January 10	7:00 PM	at Connecticut	#6	XL Center • Hartford, Connecticut		L 0–2	6,855	14–4–3 (7–1–2)
January 16	7:00 PM	at Maine	#6	Alfond Arena • Orono, Maine		W 2–0	3,820	15–4–3 (8–1–2)
January 18	2:00 PM	at #2 Boston University	#6	Agganis Arena • Boston, Massachusetts		L 3–4 ^{OT}	4,786	15–5–3 (8–2–2)
January 23	7:00 PM	#18 Providence	#5	Tsongas Center • Lowell, Massachusetts	NESN	L 3–7	6,750	15–6–3 (8–3–2)
January 24	7:00 PM	at #18 Providence	#5	Schneider Arena • Providence, Rhode Island		L 1–4	3,033	15–7–3 (8–4–2)
January 30	7:00 PM	at #19 Merrimack	#10	Lawler Arena • North Andover, Massachusetts		L 1–2	2,549	15–8–3 (8–5–2)
January 31	7:00 PM	#19 Merrimack	#10	Tsongas Center • Lowell, Massachusetts		W 4–1	6,351	16–8–3 (9–5–2)
February 6	7:15 PM	#3 Boston University	#12	Tsongas Center • Lowell, Massachusetts		L 2–5	7,241	16–9–3 (9–6–2)
February 7	7:00 PM	at UMass	#12	Mullins Center • Amherst, Massachusetts		L 2–5	2,726	16–10–3 (9–7–2)
February 13	7:00 PM	at UMass*	#16	Mullins Center • Amherst, Massachusetts		T 3–3 ^{OT}	2,124	16–10–4
February 14	7:00 PM	UMass	#16	Tsongas Center • Lowell, Massachusetts		W 7–1	4,336	17–10–4 (10–7–2)
February 20	7:30 PM	at #10 Boston College	#16	Kelley Rink • Chestnut Hill, Massachusetts		T 2–2 ^{OT}	6,615	17–10–5 (10–7–3)
February 27	7:15 PM	#18 Vermont	#14	Tsongas Center • Lowell, Massachusetts		W 4–1	5,514	18–10–5 (11–7–3)
February 28	7:15 PM	#18 Vermont	#14	Tsongas Center • Lowell, Massachusetts		T 2–2 ^{OT}	6,261	18–10–6 (11–7–4)
Postseason
March 13	7:15 PM	Notre Dame*	#14	Tsongas Center • Lowell, Massachusetts (Hockey East Quarterfinal)		W 5–0	4,137	19–10–6
March 14	7:00 PM	Notre Dame*	#14	Tsongas Center • Lowell, Massachusetts (Hockey East Quarterfinal)		L 2–4	4,291	19–11–6
March 15	4:00 PM	Notre Dame*	#14	Tsongas Center • Lowell, Massachusetts (Hockey East Quarterfinal)		W 6–4	2,414	20–11–6
March 20	5:00 PM	#16 Vermont*	#12	TD Garden • Boston, Massachusetts (Hockey East Semifinal)	NBCSN	W 4–1	13,263	21–11–6
March 21	5:00 PM	#3 Boston University*	#12	TD Garden • Boston, Massachusetts (Hockey East Championship)	NBCSN	L 3–5	13,352	21–12–6
*Non-conference game. ^{#}Rankings from USCHO.com Poll. All times are in Eastern Time.

== Rankings ==
Poll	Week																							
Poll	Pre	1	2	3	4	5	6	7	8	9	10	11	12	13	14	15	16	17	18	19	20	21	22	23 (Final)
USCHO.com	17	9	7	8	6	4	5	4	7	8	9	6	6	5	10	12	16	16	14	14	14	12	14	
USA Today	NR	9	8	9	7	4	5	4	7	8	7	5	6	5	10	11	15	RV	RV	14	14	12	15	
