= 2014–15 UMass Minutemen ice hockey season =

- Conference: Hockey East
- Home ice: Mullins Center

Record
- Overall: 11–23–2 (5–16–1 HEA)
- Home: 6–10–1
- Road: 4–12–1
- Neutral: 1–1–0

Coaches and captains
- Head coach: John Micheletto
- Assistant coaches: Joey Gasparini; Ryan Miller

The 2014–15 UMass Minutemen ice hockey team represented the University of Massachusetts Amherst during the 2014–15 NCAA Division I men's ice hockey season. The team was coached by John Micheletto, in his 3rd season with the Minutemen. The Minutemen played their home games at the Mullins Center on campus in Amherst, Massachusetts, competing in Hockey East.

== Previous season ==
In 2013–14, the Minutemen finished 10th in Hockey East with a record of 8–22–4, 4–13–3 in conference play. In the 2014 Hockey East Men's Ice Hockey Tournament, they lost in the opening round to Vermont, by a score of 2–1. They failed to qualify for the 2014 NCAA Division I Men's Ice Hockey Tournament.

== Personnel ==
=== Roster ===
As of December 22, 2014.

No.	Nat.	Player	Class	Pos	Height	Weight	DoB	Hometown	Previous team	NHL rights
2		Mike Busillo	Senior	D	6' 2" (1.88 m)	203 lb (92 kg)	1991-03-16	Wallingford, Connecticut	Hartford (EHL)	—
3		Keith Burchett	Freshman	F	5' 11" (1.8 m)	192 lb (87 kg)	1994-12-08	Oak Brook, Illinois	Sioux Falls (USHL)	—
4		Marc Hetnik	Sophomore	D	6' 2" (1.88 m)	190 lb (86 kg)	1992-04-15	Chestnut Hill, Massachusetts	Vernon (BCHL)	—
6		Dominic Trento	Freshman	F	5' 11" (1.8 m)	170 lb (77 kg)	1993-01-06	Brockport, New York	New Jersey (USPHL)	—
7		Patrick Lee	Freshman	F	5' 9" (1.75 m)	165 lb (75 kg)	1994-10-08	Calgary, Alberta	Brooks (AJHL)	—
8		Jake Horton	Freshman	D	5' 11" (1.8 m)	204 lb (93 kg)	1994-05-24	Lake Elmo, Minnesota	Aberdeen (NAHL)	—
9		Steven Guzzo	Senior (RS)	F	6' 0" (1.83 m)	184 lb (83 kg)	1990-09-24	Oakville, Ontario	Oakville (OJHL)	—
10		Shane Walsh	Junior	F	5' 10" (1.78 m)	173 lb (78 kg)	1991-12-01	West Roxbury, Massachusetts	South Shore (USPHL)	—
11		Ben Gallacher	Junior	D	5' 11" (1.8 m)	191 lb (87 kg)	1992-09-11	Calgary, Alberta	Green Bay (USHL)	—
13		Frank Vatrano	Sophomore (RS)	F	5' 10" (1.78 m)	215 lb (98 kg)	1994-03-14	East Longmeadow, Massachusetts	Boston (EJHL)	—
15		Ray Pigozzi	Sophomore	F	6' 0" (1.83 m)	176 lb (80 kg)	1994-04-03	Evanston, Illinois	Chicago (USHL)	—
16		Steven Iacobellis	Sophomore	F	5' 9" (1.75 m)	170 lb (77 kg)	1993-08-20	Port Coquitlam, British Columbia	Salmon Arm (BCHL)	—
17		Brennan Baxandall	Sophomore	D	6' 2" (1.88 m)	207 lb (94 kg)	1992-05-17	Calgary, Alberta	Drumheller (AJHL)	—
18		Zack LaRue	Senior	F	6' 1" (1.85 m)	194 lb (88 kg)	1990-03-08	Sault Ste. Marie, Ontario	Markham (OJHL)	—
19		Emerson Auvenshine	Senior	F	6' 2" (1.88 m)	205 lb (93 kg)	1990-08-01	Eaton Rapids, Michigan	Bismarck (NAHL)	—
21		Anthony Petrella	Freshman	F	5' 9" (1.75 m)	181 lb (82 kg)	1996-03-06	Hilton, New York	Shattuck-Saint Mary's (Midget AAA)	—
22		Troy Power	Senior (RS)	F	5' 11" (1.8 m)	185 lb (84 kg)	1990-03-29	Camarillo, California	Omaha (USHL)	—
23		Maddison Smiley	Freshman	D	5' 11" (1.8 m)	198 lb (90 kg)	1994-02-20	Airdrie, Alberta	Brooks (AJHL)	—
24		Dennis Kravchenko	Freshman	F	5' 9" (1.75 m)	170 lb (77 kg)	1994-03-30	Laguna Niguel, California	Sioux Falls (USHL)	—
25		Oleg Yevenko	Senior	D	6' 7" (2.01 m)	230 lb (104 kg)	1991-01-21	Minsk, Belarus	Fargo (USHL)	—
26		Brandon Montour	Freshman	D	6' 0" (1.83 m)	190 lb (86 kg)	1994-04-11	Ohsweken, Ontario	Waterloo (USHL)	ANA, 55th overall 2014
27		Riley McDougall	Freshman	F	5' 10" (1.78 m)	190 lb (86 kg)	1993-07-10	Calgary, Alberta	Calgary (AJHL)	—
32		Henry Dill	Freshman	G	6' 2" (1.88 m)	205 lb (93 kg)	1995-06-05	Columbus, Ohio	Aberdeen (NAHL)	—
34		Alex Wakaluk	Sophomore	G	5' 9" (1.75 m)	176 lb (80 kg)	1993-08-20	Bellevue, Alberta	Melville (SJHL)	—
39		Steve Mastalerz	Senior	G	6' 2" (1.88 m)	205 lb (93 kg)	1992-06-29	North Andover, Massachusetts	Kimball Union (USHS–NH)	—

=== Coaching staff ===
Name	Position	Seasons at UMass	Alma mater
John Micheletto	Head coach	3	Dartmouth College (1990)
Joey Gasparini	Assistant coach	3	University of Vermont (2006)
Ryan Miller	Assistant coach	2	University of Vermont (2003)

== Standings ==
2014–15 Hockey East men's standings
	Conference record							Overall record					
	GP	W	L	T	PTS	GF	GA	GP	W	L	T	GF	GA
#2 Boston University †*	22	14	5	3	31	88	55	41	28	8	5	158	95
#1 Providence	22	13	8	1	27	61	37	41	26	13	2	123	84
#13 Boston College	22	12	7	3	27	60	50	38	21	14	3	107	91
#17 Massachusetts–Lowell	22	11	7	4	26	70	52	39	21	12	6	134	101
Notre Dame	22	10	7	5	25	64	54	42	18	19	5	126	116
Northeastern	22	11	9	2	24	70	69	36	16	16	4	107	107
Vermont	22	10	9	3	23	62	53	41	22	15	4	110	91
New Hampshire	22	10	11	1	21	66	68	40	19	19	2	119	109
Connecticut	22	7	11	4	18	42	74	36	10	19	7	66	111
Maine	22	8	12	2	18	64	74	39	14	22	3	108	127
Merrimack	22	5	14	3	13	38	56	38	16	18	4	81	93
Massachusetts	22	5	16	1	11	59	102	36	11	23	2	99	152
Championship: March 21, 2015 † indicates conference regular season champion; * indicates conference tournament champion Rankings: USCHO.com Top 20 Poll; updated March 9, 2015

== Schedule ==
Date	Time	Opponent^{#}	Rank^{#}	Site	TV	Result	Attendance	Record
Exhibition
October 4	7:00 PM	Dalhousie*		Mullins Center • Amherst, Massachusetts		W 5–2	N/A	0–0–0
Regular Season
October 10	7:00 PM	#20 Boston University		Mullins Center • Amherst, Massachusetts		L 1–8	4,288	0–1–0 (0–1–0)
October 17	7:00 PM	at Michigan State*		Munn Ice Arena • East Lansing, Michigan		L 3–5	5,841	0–2–0
October 18	7:00 PM	at Michigan State*		Munn Ice Arena • East Lansing, Michigan		W 4–3	3,396	1–2–0
October 24	7:00 PM	at Northeastern		Matthews Arena • Boston, Massachusetts		W 3–2	4,370	2–2–0 (1–1–0)
October 25	7:00 PM	at #6 Boston College		Kelley Rink • Boston, Massachusetts		L 1–4	4,908	2–3–0 (1–2–0)
October 31	7:00 PM	at Maine		Alfond Arena • Orono, Maine		L 5–6 ^{OT}	3,378	2–4–0 (1–3–0)
November 1	7:00 PM	at Maine		Alfond Arena • Orono, Maine	FCS	L 2–3	3,706	2–5–0 (1–4–0)
November 7	7:00 PM	American International*		Mullins Center • Amherst, Massachusetts		W 7–1	3,102	3–5–0
November 21	7:00 PM	#12 Boston College		Mullins Center • Amherst, Massachusetts		L 3–5	5,939	3–6–0 (1–5–0)
November 22	7:00 PM	#11 Vermont		Mullins Center • Amherst, Massachusetts		L 1–11	3,027	3–7–0 (1–6–0)
November 25	7:00 PM	at #13 Vermont		Gutterson Fieldhouse • Burlington, Vermont	NESN	L 1–3	4,007	3–8–0 (1–7–0)
November 28	7:00 PM	at #14 Quinnipiac*		TD Bank Sports Center • Hamden, Connecticut		W 3–2	3,305	4–8–0
November 29	7:00 PM	at #14 Quinnipiac*		TD Bank Sports Center • Hamden, Connecticut		L 1–3	1,911	4–9–0
December 5	7:00 PM	Notre Dame		Mullins Center • Amherst, Massachusetts		L 5–7	2,744	4–10–0 (1–8–0)
December 6	7:00 PM	Notre Dame		Mullins Center • Amherst, Massachusetts		L 0–4	2,469	4–11–0 (1–9–0)
December 16	7:00 PM	Northeastern*		Mullins Center • Amherst, Massachusetts		L 3–8	1,080	4–12–0
December 28	4:00 PM	vs. Providence*		Gutterson Fieldhouse • Burlington, Vermont (Catamount Cup)		L 1–4	4,007	4–13–0
December 29	4:00 PM	vs. Air Force*		Gutterson Fieldhouse • Burlington, Vermont (Catamount Cup)		W 5–1	4,007	5–13–0
January 2	7:00 PM	Connecticut		Mullins Center • Amherst, Massachusetts		L 3–4	2,838	5–14–0 (1–10–0)
January 9	7:00 PM	Maine*		Mullins Center • Amherst, Massachusetts		W 3–2	1,441	6–14–0
January 10	7:00 PM	Maine*		Mullins Center • Amherst, Massachusetts		L 0–3	1,588	6–15–0
January 16	7:00 PM	New Hampshire		Mullins Center • Amherst, Massachusetts		W 6–4	2,246	7–15–0 (2–10–0)
January 17	6:30 PM	at New Hampshire		Whittemore Center • Durham, New Hampshire	NBCSN	L 2–5	5,021	7–16–0 (2–11–0)
January 23	7:00 PM	at #14 Merrimack		Lawler Arena • North Andover, Massachusetts		T 4–4 ^{OT}	2,291	7–16–1 (2–11–1)
January 25	7:00 PM	#14 Merrimack		Mullins Center • Amherst, Massachusetts		W 4–1	1,224	8–16–1 (3–11–1)
January 30	7:30 PM	at Boston University		Agganis Arena • Boston, Massachusetts		L 5–9	5,026	8–17–1 (3–12–1)
February 6	7:00 PM	Northeastern		Mullins Center • Amherst, Massachusetts		L 3–5	2,522	8–18–1 (3–13–1)
February 7	7:00 PM	#12 UMass Lowell		Mullins Center • Amherst, Massachusetts		W 5–2	2,726	9–18–1 (4–13–1)
February 13	7:00 PM	#16 UMass Lowell*		Mullins Center • Amherst, Massachusetts		T 3–3 ^{OT}	2,124	9–18–2
February 14	7:00 PM	at #16 UMass Lowell		Tsongas Center • Lowell, Massachusetts		L 1–7	4,336	9–19–2 (4–14–1)
February 20	7:00 PM	at Providence		Schneider Arena • Providence, Rhode Island		L 2–3 ^{OT}	2,445	9–20–2 (4–15–1)
February 21	7:00 PM	Providence		Mullins Center • Amherst, Massachusetts		W 2–1 ^{OT}	2,615	10–20–2 (5–15–1)
February 27	7:00 PM	at Connecticut		XL Center • Hartford, Connecticut		L 0–4	6,298	10–21–2 (5–16–1)
Postseason
March 6	7:30 PM	at Notre Dame*		Compton Family Ice Arena • Notre Dame, Indiana (Hockey East First Round)		W 4–3 ^{5OT}	3,994	11–21–2
March 7	7:00 PM	at Notre Dame*		Compton Family Ice Arena • Notre Dame, Indiana (Hockey East First Round)		L 3–5	4,298	11–22–2
March 8	7:00 PM	at Notre Dame*		Compton Family Ice Arena • Notre Dame, Indiana (Hockey East First Round)		L 0–7	3,368	11–23–2
*Non-conference game. ^{#}Rankings from USCHO.com Poll. All times are in Eastern Time.

== Rankings ==
Poll	Week																							
Poll	Pre	1	2	3	4	5	6	7	8	9	10	11	12	13	14	15	16	17	18	19	20	21	22	23 (Final)
USCHO.com	RV	NR	NR	NR	NR	NR	NR	NR	NR	NR	NR	NR	NR	NR	NR	NR	NR	NR	NR	NR	NR	NR	NR	NR
USA Today	NR	NR	NR	NR	NR	NR	NR	NR	NR	NR	NR	NR	NR	NR	NR	NR	NR	NR	NR	NR	NR	NR	NR	NR
