= Kyle Wallack =

American ice hockey coach

Current position
- Title: Head coach
- Team: Albertus Magnus Falcons
- Conference: Independent

Biographical details
- Born: West Hartford, Connecticut, U.S.
- Education: Springfield College (BA); Connecticut (MS)

Coaching career (HC unless noted)
- 1997–1998: Delaware (assistant)
- 1998–1999: Nichols College (assistant)
- 1999–2002: Quinnipiac (assistant)
- 2002–2004: Connecticut (assistant)
- 2004–2006: Holy Cross (assistant)
- 2006–2011: Yale (assistant)
- 2011–2012: Indiana Ice
- 2012–2015: Vermont (assistant)
- 2015–2019: Vermont (AHC)
- 2019–present: Albertus Magnus

Head coaching record
- Overall: 53–44–4 (.545)

Kyle Wallack is an American ice hockey coach from West Hartford, Connecticut. He is currently the head coach for Albertus Magnus Falcons men's ice hockey team. Prior to becoming head coach at Albertus Magnus, Wallack served as the associate head coach at the University of Vermont. In May 2020 Wallack was a finalist for the head coaching position at LIU, but withdrew his name from consideration.

== Playing career ==
Wallack was a four-year starting goaltender at Springfield College. He was captain his senior year and earned All-NECHA honors twice.

== Coaching career ==
=== Indiana Ice ===
In 2011 the Indiana Ice of the USHL named Wallack head coach and general manager. In his only season with the Ice, Wallack led the team to a 34–15–9 record and playoff berth. With two games left in the regular season, the Ice relieved Wallack of his coaching duties.

=== Vermont ===
Vermont head coach Kevin Sneddon hired Wallack as an assistant coach in August 2012. In the summer of 2015 Wallack and assistant coach Kevin Patrick were both promoted to the position of associate head coach.

== Head coaching record ==
Record table
Season	Team	Overall	Conference	Standing	Postseason
Albertus Magnus Falcons (Independent) (2019–2024)
2019–20	Albertus Magnus	4–18–2			
2020–21	Albertus Magnus	0–2			
2021–22	Albertus Magnus	16–8–1			
2022–23	Albertus Magnus	17–7–1			
2023–24	Albertus Magnus	16–9–0			
Albertus Magnus Falcons (New England Hockey Conference) (2024–2025)
2024–25	Albertus Magnus	12–13–1			
Albertus Magnus:		53–44–4 (.545)			
Total:		53–44–4 (.545)			
National champion Postseason invitational champion Conference regular season champion Conference regular season and conference tournament champion Division regular season champion Division regular season and conference tournament champion Conference tournament champion
