= 2014–15 Yale Bulldogs men's ice hockey season =

College ice hockey season

Ivy League Champions NCAA Northeast Regional semifinal, L 2–3 OT vs. BU
- Conference: 3rd ECAC Hockey
- Home ice: Ingalls Rink

Rankings
- USCHO: #17
- USA Today: #15

Record
- Overall: 18–10–5
- Conference: 12–6–4
- Home: 8–5–3
- Road: 8–4–1
- Neutral: 2–1–1

Coaches and captains
- Head coach: Keith Allain
- Assistant coaches: Dan Muse; Jason Guerriero; Josh Siembida; Stephen Volek
- Captain: Tommy Fallen

The 2014–15 Yale Bulldogs men's ice hockey team represented Yale University in the 2014–15 NCAA Division I men's ice hockey season. The team was coached by Keith Allain, '80, his ninth season behind the bench at Yale. His assistant coaches were Dan Muse, Jason Guerriero, Josh Siembida, and Stephen Volek. The Bulldogs played their home games at Ingalls Rink on the campus of Yale University, competing in the ECAC.

== Offseason ==
Three Senior Bulldogs graduated in May: Captain Jesse Root – F, Kenny Agostino – F, and Gus Young – D

Senior defensemen Tommy Fallen was named Captain for the 2014–15 season.

== Recruiting ==
Yale added five freshmen for the 2014–15 season: three forwards, and two defensemen.

Player	Position	Nationality	Notes
John Baiocco	Forward	United States	New Vernon, NJ; Played for the Fargo Force (USHL) and Dubuque Fighting Saints (USHL)
Henry Hart	Forward	United States	Stillwater, MN; Played for the Phillips Exeter Academy
Ryan Hitchcock	Forward	United States	Manhassett, NY; Played for the U.S. National Team
Adam Larkin	Defense	United States	Clarkston, MI; Played for the Muskegon Lumberjacks (USHL)
Nate Repensky	Defense	United States	Duluth, MN; Played for the Bismarck Bobcats (NAHL)

== 2014–15 Roster ==
=== Departures from 2013–2014 team ===
- Kenny Agostino, F – Graduation – Signed a contract with the Calgary Flames, currently playing for the AHL Affiliate, Calgary Flames.
- Jesse Root, F – Graduation – Signed a contract with the Dallas Stars, currently playing for the AHL Affiliate, Texas Stars.
- Gus Young, D – Graduation – Signed a contract with the Worcester Sharks

=== 2014–15 Bulldogs ===
As of February 20, 2015.

No.	Nat.	Player	Class	Pos	Height	Weight	DoB	Hometown	Previous team	NHL rights
2	(United States)	Adam Larkin	Freshman	D	6' 1" (1.85 m)	182 lb (83 kg)	1995-01-28	Clarkston, Michigan	Muskegon Lumberjacks (USHL)	—
3	(United States)	Dan O'Keefe	Sophomore	D	6' 3" (1.91 m)	205 lb (93 kg)	1994-03-06	North Wall, New Jersey	Surrey Eagles (BCHL)	—
4	(United States)	Rob O'Gara	Junior	D	6' 4" (1.93 m)	205 lb (93 kg)	1993-07-06	Nesconset, New York	Milton Academy (USHS–MA)	BOS, 151st overall 2011
5	(United States)	Tim Bonner	Sophomore	F	5' 9" (1.75 m)	175 lb (79 kg)	1992-08-19	Plymouth, Minnesota	Tri-City Storm (USHL)	—
6	(United States)	Stu Wilson	Junior	F	5' 10" (1.78 m)	170 lb (77 kg)	1991-11-15	Pittsford, New York	Cedar Rapids RoughRiders (USHL)	—
7	(United States)	Matt Killian	Senior	D	6' 1" (1.85 m)	200 lb (91 kg)	1992-10-20	Basking Ridge, New Jersey	Delbarton School (USHS–NJ)	—
9	(Canada)	Carson Cooper	Junior	F	5' 11" (1.8 m)	191 lb (87 kg)	1992-03-18	Bow Island, Alberta	Fort McMurray Oil Barons (AJHL)	—
10	(United States)	Mitch Witek	Junior	D	6' 1" (1.85 m)	205 lb (93 kg)	1992-02-04	Downers Grove, Illinois	Waterloo Black Hawks (USHL)	—
11	(United States)	Trent Ruffolo	Senior	F	6' 1" (1.85 m)	180 lb (82 kg)	1992-01-15	Coral Springs, Florida	New Hampshire Junior Monarchs (EJHL)	—
12	(United States)	Cody Learned	Junior	F	5' 9" (1.75 m)	175 lb (79 kg)	1991-10-02	Amherst, New Hampshire	Boston Junior Bruins (EJHL)	—
13	(United States)	Matthew Beattie	Junior	F	6' 3" (1.91 m)	190 lb (86 kg)	1992-12-14	Whitehouse Station, New Jersey	Phillips Exeter Academy (USHS–MA)	VAN, 207th overall 2012
14	(United States)	Ryan Obuchowski	Junior	D	6' 1" (1.85 m)	185 lb (84 kg)	1992-06-07	West Bloomfield Township, Michigan	Indiana Ice (USHL)	—
15	(United States)	Henry Hart	Freshman	F	5' 7" (1.7 m)	155 lb (70 kg)	1994-09-27	Stillwater, Minnesota	Phillips Exeter Academy (USHS–MA)	—
16	(United States)	Alex Ward	Senior	F	6' 1" (1.85 m)	180 lb (82 kg)	1991-11-21	Burlington, Vermont	Deerfield Academy (USHS–MA)	—
17	(United States)	Frankie DiChiara	Sophomore	F	6' 2" (1.88 m)	218 lb (99 kg)	1993-09-22	Ronkonkoma, New York	Dubuque Fighting Saints (USHL)	—
18	(United States)	Nate Repensky	Freshman	D	5' 11" (1.8 m)	180 lb (82 kg)	1993-11-22	Duluth, Minnesota	Bismarck Bobcats (NAHL)	—
19	(United States)	Anthony Day	Senior	F	5' 9" (1.75 m)	175 lb (79 kg)	1991-05-25	Buffalo, New York	Waterloo Black Hawks (USHL)	—
20	(United States)	John Baiocco	Freshman	F	5' 8" (1.73 m)	170 lb (77 kg)	1995-06-06	New Vernon, New Jersey	Dubuque Fighting Saints (USHL)	—
21	(United States)	John Hayden	Sophomore	F	6' 3" (1.91 m)	210 lb (95 kg)	1995-02-14	Greenwich, Connecticut	US NTDP (USHL)	CHI, 74th overall 2013
22	(United States)	Tommy Fallen	Senior	D	5' 9" (1.75 m)	175 lb (79 kg)	1991-04-17	Plymouth, Minnesota	Cedar Rapids RoughRiders (USHL)	—
24	(United States)	Mike Doherty	Sophomore	F	5' 11" (1.8 m)	170 lb (77 kg)	1993-08-21	Reading, Massachusetts	Middlesex Islanders (EJHL)	—
25	(United States)	Chris Izmirlian	Sophomore	F	5' 10" (1.78 m)	185 lb (84 kg)	1992-12-28	Highland Beach, Florida	Middlesex Islanders (EJHL)	—
26	(Norway)	Nicholas Weberg	Senior	F	5' 8" (1.73 m)	160 lb (73 kg)	1992-02-20	Oslo, Norway	Shattuck-Saint Mary's (Midget AAA)	—
27	(United States)	Charles Orzetti	Junior	F	6' 4" (1.93 m)	223 lb (101 kg)	1992-02-02	Ridgewood, New Jersey	Surrey Eagles (BCHL)	—
28	(United States)	Ryan Hitchcock	Freshman	F	5' 10" (1.78 m)	170 lb (77 kg)	1996-03-30	Manhasset, New York	USNTDP (USHL)	—
29	(United States)	Connor Wilson	Senior	G	5' 10" (1.78 m)	170 lb (77 kg)	1991-08-30	Cary, North Carolina	Chicago Steel (USHL)	—
30	(Canada)	Patrick Spano	Sophomore	G	6' 1" (1.85 m)	180 lb (82 kg)	1993-03-01	Montreal, Quebec	Cowichan Valley Capitals (BCHL)	—
34	(United States)	Alex Lyon	Sophomore	G	6' 1" (1.85 m)	200 lb (91 kg)	1992-12-09	Baudette, Minnesota	Omaha Lancers (USHL)	—

=== Coaching staff ===
Name	Position	Seasons Coaching at Yale University	Alma mater
Keith Allain	Head Coach	13	Yale University (1980)
Dan Muse	Associate head coach	6	Stonehill College (2006)
Jason Guerriero	Assistant coach	2	Northeastern University (2005)
Josh Siembida	Volunteer Assistant Coach	2	Quinnipiac University (2006)
Stephen Volek	Assistant director Strength & Conditioning	1	Penn State (2010)

== Standings ==
- 2014–15 ECAC Hockey men's standings
  	Conference record							Overall record					
  	GP	W	L	T	PTS	GF	GA	GP	W	L	T	GF	GA
  #14 Quinnipiac^{†}	22	16	3	3	35	60	37	39	23	12	4	106	89
  St. Lawrence	22	14	7	1	29	70	41	37	20	14	3	113	75
  #15 Yale	22	12	6	4	28	60	37	33	18	10	5	86	54
  #19 Colgate	22	11	7	4	26	53	51	38	22	12	4	102	82
  Dartmouth	22	12	8	2	26	64	55	33	17	12	4	91	78
  #11 Harvard*	22	11	8	3	25	71	54	37	21	13	3	121	92
  Cornell	22	9	9	4	22	45	46	31	11	14	6	57	68
  Clarkson	22	8	11	3	19	49	47	37	12	20	5	81	87
  Rensselaer	22	8	12	2	18	53	66	41	12	26	3	77	131
  Union	22	8	13	1	17	58	63	39	19	18	2	122	104
  Brown	22	5	14	3	13	44	80	31	8	20	3	65	112
  Princeton	22	2	18	2	6	25	75	30	4	23	3	39	99
  Championship: March 21, 2015 † indicates conference regular season champion (Cleary Cup) * indicates conference tournament champion (Whitelaw Cup); Rankings: USCHO.com Top 20 Poll; updated March 9, 2015

== Schedule ==
Date	Time	Opponent^{#}	Rank^{#}	Site	TV	Decision	Result	Attendance	Record
Exhibition
October 24	7:00 pm	Alberta*		Ingalls Rink • New Haven, CT		Lyon	L 0–3	1,841	0–0–0 (0–0–0)
December 27	7:00 pm	Russian Red Stars*		Ingalls Rink • New Haven, CT		Lyon	W 2–1	3,316	6–3–2 (4–3–1)
Regular season
October 31	8:00 pm	vs. Princeton*		Prudential Center • Newark, NJ (Liberty Hockey Invitational)		Lyon	T 2–2 ^{OT}	2,113	0–0–1 (0–0–0)
November 2	4:00 pm	vs. Connecticut*		Prudential Center • Newark, NJ (Liberty Hockey Invitational)		Lyon	W 2–1	2,987	1–0–1 (0–0–0)
November 7	7:00 pm	Clarkson		Ingalls Rink • New Haven, CT		Lyon	T 2–2 ^{OT}	3,500	1–0–2 (0–0–1)
November 8	7:00 pm	St. Lawerence		Ingalls Rink • New Haven, CT		Lyon	L 0–4	3,500	1–1–2 (0–1–1)
November 14	7:05 pm	at Dartmouth		Thompson Arena • Hanover, NH		Lyon	W 4–1	3,121	2–1–2 (1–1–1)
November 15	7:00 pm	at Harvard		Bright Hockey Center • Cambridge, MA	NESN	Lyon	W 2–1	2,575	3–1–2 (2–1–1)
November 21	7:03 pm	at Cornell		Lynah Rink • Ithaca, NY		Lyon	L 2–3	4,137	3–2–2 (2–2–1)
November 22	7:00 pm	at #6 Colgate		Starr Rink • Hamilton, NY		Lyon	W 3–1	1,386	4–2–2 (3–2–1)
November 29	7:00 pm	RIT*		Ingalls Rink • New Haven, CT		Spano	W 2–0	3,234	5–2–2 (3–2–1)
December 5	7:00 pm	at RPI		Ingalls Rink • New Haven, CT		Lyon	W 5–2	3,278	6–2–2 (4–2–1)
December 6	7:00 pm	Union		Ingalls Rink • New Haven, CT		Lyon	L 1–3	3,500	6–3–2 (4–3–1)
December 30	7:05 pm	at Holy Cross*		Hart Center • Worcester, MA		Lyon	W 3–0	1,154	7–3–2 (4–3–1)
January 3	7:30 pm	#10 Vermont*		Ingalls Rink • New Haven, CT		Lyon	W 3–1	3,500	8–3–2 (4–3–1)
January 6	7:00 pm	at Northeaster*	#19	Matthews Arena • Boston, MA		Lyon	L 2–3	1,350	8–4–2 (4–3–1)
January 10	8:20 pm	vs. #3 Havard*	#19	MSG • New York, NY (Rivalry on Ice)	NBCSN/TSN2	Lyon	W 4–1	12,774	9–4–2 (4–3–1)
January 16	7:30 pm	at Brown	#18	Meehan Auditorium • Providence, RI		Lyon	W 1–0	1,214	10–4–2 (5–3–1)
January 17	7:00 pm	Brown	#18	Ingalls Rink • New Haven, CT		Lyon	W 5–1	3,500	11–4–2 (6–3–1)
January 23	7:00 pm	at St. Lawrence	#13	Appleton Arena • Canton, NY		Lyon	L 2–3 ^{OT}	1,437	11–5–2 (6–4–1)
January 24	7:00 pm	at Clarkson	#13	Cheel Arena • Potsdam, NY		Lyon	L 0–1	2,372	11–6–2 (6–5–1)
January 30	7:00 pm	Princeton	#16	Ingalls Rink • New Haven, CT		Lyon	W 4–0	3,500	12–6–2 (7–5–1)
January 31	7:00 pm	#18 Quinnipiac	#16	Ingalls Rink • New Haven, CT		Lyon	T 2–2 ^{OT}	3,500	12–6–3 (7–5–2)
February 6	7:00 pm	at #6 Harvard	#15	Ingalls Rink • New Haven, CT		Lyon	W 3–0	3,500	13–6–3 (8–5–2)
February 7	7:00 pm	Dartmouth	#15	Ingalls Rink • New Haven, CT		Lyon	L 4–6	3,500	13–7–3 (8–6–2)
February 13	7:08 pm	at Union	#15	Achilles Rink • Schenectady, NY	TWCS	Lyon	W 2–0	2,049	14–7–3 (9–6–2)
February 14	7:07 pm	at RPI	#15	Houston Field House • Troy, NY	TWCS	Lyon	W 4–1	4,746	15–7–3 (10–6–2)
February 20	7:07 pm	at #11 Quinnipiac	#13	TD Bank Sports Center • Hamden, CT (Heroes Hat)	SNY/TSN	Lyon	T 2–2 ^{OT}	3,696	15–7–4 (10–6–3)
February 21	7:00 pm	at Princeton	#13	Hobey Baker Memorial Rink • Princeton, NJ		Lyon	W 6–2	2,065	16–7–4 (11–6–3)
February 27	7:00 pm	Colgate	#12	Ingalls Rink • New Haven, CT	ESPN3	Lyon	T 2–2 ^{OT}	3,500	16–7–5 (11–6–4)
February 28	7:00 pm	Cornell	#12	Ingalls Rink • New Haven, CT		Lyon	W 4–0	3,500	17–7–5 (12–6–4)
ECAC Tournament
March 13	7:00 pm	#18 Harvard*	#12	Ingalls Rink • New Haven, CT (ECAC Tournament Quarterfinals)		Lyon	L 2–3	2,479	17–8–5 (12–6–4)
March 14	7:00 pm	#18 Harvard*	#12	Ingalls Rink • New Haven, CT (ECAC Tournament Quarterfinals)		Lyon	W 2–0	2,988	18–8–5 (12–6–4)
March 15	7:00 pm	#18 Harvard*	#12	Ingalls Rink • New Haven, CT (ECAC Tournament Quarterfinals)		Lyon	L 2–3 ^{2OT}	2,515	18–9–5 (12–6–4)
NCAA Tournament
March 27	2:00 pm	vs. #2 Boston University*	#17	Verizon Wireless Arena • Manchester, NH (NCAA Northeast Regional semifinal)	ESPNU	Lyon	L 2–3 ^{OT}	5,123	18–10–5 (12–6–4)
*Non-conference game. ^{#}Rankings from USCHO.com Poll. All times are in Eastern Time.

- On November 2, the Bulldogs beat Connecticut 2–1 to win the Liberty Hockey Invitational at the Prudential Center.
- On January 2, Yale's John Hayden was away, representing the United States at the 2015 World Juniors in Montreal, Quebec and Toronto, Ontario, Canada. The US lost to Russia in the quarterfinal.
- On January 10, the Bulldogs won the 2nd edition of Rivalry on Ice with a 4–1 win over Harvard in Madison Square Garden.
- On January 20, the Bulldogs tied for the Heroes Hat with a 2–2 tie with host Quinnipiac.
- On February 27, the Bulldogs secured a 1st-round bye in the ECAC playoffs, and will host a quarterfinals matchup at Ingalls Rink.
- On March 5, the Ivy League announced the season's Awards recipients and the All-League teams. Rob O'Gara and Alex Lyon were named to the All-Ivy first team, with John Hayden making the All-Ivy second teams. Ryan Hitchcock was unanimously selected as Ivy League Rookie of the Year. Additionally, Keith Allain was unanimously selected as the Ivy League Coach of the Year.
- On March 15, the Bulldogs were defeated by the Harvard Crimson in the quarterfinals of the ECAC tournament, losing the best of three series in three games. Harvard took game 1 by a score of 2–3, but Yale tied the series by winning game 2 and 3 by scores of 2–0. In the 3rd and final game of the series Harvard won 2–3 with the game-winning goal in the 2nd overtime period.
- On March 20, ECAC Hockey announced the season's Awards recipients and the All-Conference teams. Rob O'Gara and Alex Lyon were named to the All-League first team. Rob O'Gara was named ECAC's best Defensive Defenseman, while Alex Lyon was selected as the Ken Dryden Goaltender of the Year. Additionally, the Bulldogs were award the Sportsmanship Trophy.
- On March 22, the NCAA tournament Selection Committee placed Yale as the 4-seed in the Northeast Regional at Manchester, playing 1-seed Boston University in the first round.
- On March 27, Yale lost to 1-seed Boston University by a score of 3–2 in the first round.

== Rankings ==
Poll	Week																								
Poll	Pre	1	2	3	4	5	6	7	8	9	10	11	12	13	14	15	16	17	18	19	20	21	22	23	24 (Final)
USCHO.com	RV	RV	RV	RV	NR	RV	RV	RV	RV	RV	RV	19	18	13	16	15	15	13	12	12	12	19	17	17	
USA Today	RV	RV	NR	RV	NR	RV	NR	RV	RV	RV	RV	RV	RV	14	RV	15	RV	14	12	12	12	RV	RV	15	

== Statistics ==
As of March 20, 2015.

=== Skaters ===
No.	Player	POS	YR	GP	G	A	Pts	PIM	PP	SHG	GWG	+/-	SOG
17	Frankie DiChiara	F	SO	32	8	13	21	4	4	0	2	+9	69
4	Rob O'Gara	D	JR	32	6	15	21	29	1	0	1	+17	38
24	Mike Doherty	F	SO	32	12	8	20	16	1	1	2	+10	115
12	Cody Learned	F	JR	31	9	9	18	6	0	0	1	+14	62
21	John Hayden	F	SO	28	7	11	18	8	3	0	3	+2	80
9	Carson Cooper	F	JR	32	5	13	18	22	1	0	0	+12	72
28	Ryan Hitchcock	F	FR	32	3	12	15	10	1	0	1	+7	51
18	Nate Repensky	D	FR	24	2	11	13	14	1	0	0	+4	26
11	Trent Ruffolo	F	SR	24	6	4	10	2	1	0	2	-2	47
6	Stu Wilson	F	JR	30	4	6	10	8	3	0	1	+2	90
7	Matt Killian	D	SR	32	4	4	8	27	0	0	0	+2	43
14	Ryan Obuchowski	D	JR	32	3	5	8	12	0	0	0	+15	72
10	Mitch Witek	D	JR	32	3	5	8	8	1	0	1	+7	36
25	Chris Izmirlian	F	SO	23	3	4	7	12	0	0	1	+8	37
27	Charles Orzetti	F	JR	28	2	5	7	18	0	0	1	+6	38
22	Tommy Fallen (C)	D	SR	32	1	6	7	6	1	0	0	+2	57
2	Adam Larkin	D	FR	32	1	6	7	6	0	0	0	+4	23
20	John Baiocco	F	FR	21	4	2	6	4	0	0	2	+3	26
13	Matthew Beattie	F	JR	16	0	3	3	4	0	0	0	+5	18
19	Anthony Day	F	SR	6	1	0	1	0	0	0	0	-2	15
26	Nicholas Weberg	F	SR	5	0	1	1	0	0	0	0	-1	16
3	Dan O'Keefe	D	SO	5	0	1	1	6	0	0	0	E	1
15	Henry Hart	F	FR	5	0	1	1	0	0	0	0	-3	8
5	Tim Bonner	F	SO	1	0	0	0	0	0	0	0	-1	2
30	Patrick Spano	G	SO	3	0	0	0	0	0	0	0	+1	0
16	Alex Ward	F	SR	6	0	0	0	4	0	0	0	E	1
34	Alex Lyon	G	SO	31	0	0	0	0	0	0	0	+26	1
	Bench							6					
	Team			32	82	145	229	230	18	1	18	+24	1044

=== Goaltenders ===
No.	Player	POS	YR	GP	MIN	W	L	T	GA	GAA	SA	SV	SV%	SO
34	Alex Lyon	SO	G	31	1857:38	17	9	5	49	1.58	758	807	.939	7
30	Patrick Spano	SO	G	3	118:59	1	0	0	0	0	38	38	1.00	1
	Empty Net			16	7:52				0		0			
	Team			29	1984:29	18	9	5	49	.790	794	845	.969	8

== Awards and honors ==
=== Weekly awards ===
ECAC Goaltender of the Week

- Alex Lyon, G – Week of November 18, 2014
- Alex Lyon, G – Week of February 2, 2015

=== Postseason awards ===
Ivy League All-Stars

- Rob O'Gara, D – 1st Team All-Ivy
- Alex Lyon, G – 1st Team All-Ivy
- John Hayden, F – 2nd Team All-Ivy

Ivy League Awards

- Ryan Hitchcock, F – Ivy League Rookie of the Year
- Keith Allain – Ivy League Head Coach of the Year

ECAC All-Stars

- Rob O'Gara, D – 1st Team All-League
- Alex Lyon, G – 1st Team All-League

ECAC Awards

- Rob O'Gara, D – Best Defensive Defenseman
- Alex Lyon, G – Ken Dryden Goaltender of the Year
- Yale University Bulldogs – Sportsmanship Trophy
