= Kevin Patrick =

American ice hockey coach

Current position
- Title: Program manager
- Team: Culver Academies

Biographical details
- Born: Schenectady, New York, U.S.
- Education: Notre Dame (BA); Massachusetts (MS)

Coaching career (HC unless noted)
- 1998–2002: Union (assistant)
- 2002–2005: Bowling Green (assistant)
- 2005–2010: Wisconsin (assistant)
- 2010–2012: Muskegon Lumberjacks
- 2012–2015: Vermont (assistant)
- 2015–2020: Vermont (AHC)

Administrative career (AD unless noted)
- 2020–present: Culver Academies (hockey program manager)

Accomplishments and honors

Championships
- As an assistant coach National Champion (2006)

Awards
- Terry Flanagan Award (2019)

Kevin Patrick is an American ice hockey coach from Schenectady, New York. In 2020 Patrick was named boys' hockey program manager at Culver Academies. Prior to becoming the program manager at Culver, Patrick served the past eight seasons as an assistant coach at the University of Vermont.

== Playing career ==
Patrick played for four years at Notre Dame, and also played lacrosse for two seasons. After college, Patrick played professional hockey with New Haven Senators of the AHL, the St. Thomas Wildcats of the CoHL and the Green Bay Ice of the AHA.

== Coaching career ==
Patrick entered college coaching as an assistant at Union working under head coach Kevin Sneddon where he stayed until 2002.

=== Bowling Green ===
Patrick joined Scott Paluch's coaching staff as an assistant at Bowling Green for three seasons.

=== Wisconsin ===
In 2005 Patrick was hired by Wisconsin head coach Mike Eaves to be an assistant coach where he stayed until 2010. Patrick was part of Wisconsin's 2006 National Championship, and in 2010 coached Wisconsin's first Hobey Baker Award winner Blake Geoffrion.

=== Muskegon Lumberjacks ===
In 2010 the Muskegon Lumberjacks an expansion franchise in the USHL, hired Patrick to be teams head coach. Pattrick was let go from Muskegon on January 13, 2012 after starting the season with a 9–14–2 record.

=== Vermont ===
In August 2012 Patrick was hired at Vermont by former Union head coach Kevin Sneddon. In the summer of 2015 Patrick and assistant coach Kyle Wallack were both promoted to the position of associate head coach. After the 2020 season Patrick was hired at Culver Academies in Culver, Indiana, as Boys hockey program manager.
