= 2014–15 Notre Dame Fighting Irish men's ice hockey season =

- Conference: Hockey East
- Home ice: Compton Family Ice Arena

Record
- Overall: 18–19–5 (10–7–5 HEA)
- Home: 10–10–3
- Road: 7–8–2
- Neutral: 1–1–0

Coaches and captains
- Head coach: Jeff Jackson
- Assistant coaches: Paul Pooley; Andy Slaggert
- Captain(s): Steven Fogarty; Robbie Russo
- Alternate captain(s): Sam Herr; Peter Schneider

The 2014–15 Notre Dame Fighting Irish men's ice hockey team represented the University of Notre Dame in the 2014–15 NCAA Division I men's ice hockey season. The team was coached by Jeff Jackson, in his 10th season with the Fighting Irish. The Fighting Irish played their home games at Compton Family Ice Arena on campus in Notre Dame, Indiana, and competed in Hockey East.

== Previous season ==
In 2013–14, the Fighting Irish finished 8th in Hockey East with a record of 23–13–2, 9–9–2 in conference play. In the 2014 Hockey East Men's Ice Hockey Tournament, they defeated top-seeded Boston College in the quarterfinal, two games to one, before falling to UMass Lowell in the semifinals, 0–4. They qualified for the 2014 NCAA Division I Men's Ice Hockey Tournament and were selected as the second seed in the West Region in St. Paul, Minnesota. They fell in overtime, 3–4, to St. Cloud State in the first round and were eliminated.

== Personnel ==
=== Roster ===
As of January 8, 2015.

No.	Nat.	Player	Class	Pos	Height	Weight	DoB	Hometown	Previous team	NHL rights
2		Tony Bretzman	Freshman	D	5' 10" (1.78 m)	161 lb (73 kg)	1994-11-10	Mendota Heights, Minnesota	Langley (BCHL)	—
3		Jordan Gross	Freshman	D	5' 10" (1.78 m)	177 lb (80 kg)	1995-05-09	Maple Grove, Minnesota	Green Bay (USHL)	—
4		Nathan Billitier	Freshman	D	5' 10" (1.78 m)	183 lb (83 kg)	1996-05-20	Spencerport, New York	US NTDP (USHL)	—
5		Robbie Russo (C)	Senior	D	6' 0" (1.83 m)	191 lb (87 kg)	1993-02-15	Westmont, Illinois	US NTDP (USHL)	NYI, 95th overall 2011
6		Andy Ryan	Junior	D	6' 0" (1.83 m)	204 lb (93 kg)	1993-07-24	Brighton, Michigan	Sioux City (USHL)	—
8		Ben Ostlie	Sophomore	RW/D	6' 1" (1.85 m)	193 lb (88 kg)	1993-04-02	Edina, Minnesota	Omaha (USHL)	—
9		Dawson Cook	Freshman	C	6' 1" (1.85 m)	205 lb (93 kg)	1995-06-15	Cadillac, Michigan	Green Bay (USHL)	—
10		Anders Bjork	Freshman	LW	5' 11" (1.8 m)	183 lb (83 kg)	1996-08-05	Mequon, Wisconsin	US NTDP (USHL)	BOS, 146th overall 2014
12		Sam Herr (A)	Junior	LW	6' 0" (1.83 m)	213 lb (97 kg)	1992-10-13	Hinsdale, Illinois	Green Bay (USHL)	—
13		Vince Hinostroza	Sophomore	C	5' 9" (1.75 m)	180 lb (82 kg)	1994-04-03	Bartlett, Illinois	Waterloo (USHL)	CHI, 169th overall 2012
14		Thomas DiPauli	Junior	C	5' 11" (1.8 m)	191 lb (87 kg)	1994-04-29	Caldaro, Italy	US NTDP (USHL)	WSH, 100th overall 2012
15		Peter Schneider (A)	Senior	RW	5' 11" (1.8 m)	191 lb (87 kg)	1991-04-04	Vienna, Austria	Indiana (USHL)	—
16		Connor Hurley	Freshman	C	6' 2" (1.88 m)	178 lb (81 kg)	1995-09-15	Edina, Minnesota	Green Bay (USHL)	BUF, 38th overall 2013
17		Ali Thomas	Sophomore	LW	6' 3" (1.91 m)	214 lb (97 kg)	1992-09-22	New York, New York	Des Moines (USHL)	—
18		Jake Evans	Freshman	C/RW	6' 0" (1.83 m)	188 lb (85 kg)	1996-06-02	Toronto, Ontario	St. Michael's (OJHL)	MTL, 207th overall 2014
19		Garrett Peterson	Senior	RW	5' 11" (1.8 m)	196 lb (89 kg)	1991-09-13	Manhattan, Illinois	Lincoln (USHL)	—
20		Justin Wade	Sophomore	D	6' 1" (1.85 m)	216 lb (98 kg)	1994-04-13	Aurora, Illinois	Cedar Rapids (USHL)	—
21		Joe Aiken	Senior	LW	6' 1" (1.85 m)	189 lb (86 kg)	1992-00-00	Whitefish Bay, Wisconsin	Whitefish Bay (USHS–WI)	—
22		Mario Lucia	Junior	LW	6' 3" (1.91 m)	204 lb (93 kg)	1993-08-25	Plymouth, Minnesota	Penticton (BCHL)	MIN, 60th overall 2011
23		Eric Johnson	Senior	D	6' 0" (1.83 m)	197 lb (89 kg)	1991-03-28	Verona, Wisconsin	Dubuque (USHL)	—
24		Luke Ripley	Freshman	D	6' 4" (1.93 m)	196 lb (89 kg)	1994-04-16	Kitimat, British Columbia	Powell (BCHL)	—
26		Steven Fogarty (C)	Junior	C	6' 3" (1.91 m)	212 lb (96 kg)	1993-04-19	Edina, Minnesota	Penticton (BCHL)	NYR, 72nd overall 2011
27		Austin Wuthrich	Senior	RW	6' 1" (1.85 m)	204 lb (93 kg)	1993-08-11	Anchorage, Alaska	US NTDP (USHL)	WSH, 107th overall 2012
29		Bo Brauer	Freshman	RW	6' 3" (1.91 m)	210 lb (95 kg)	1995-04-20	Edina, Minnesota	Nanaimo (BCHL)	—
33		Chad Katunar	Sophomore	G	6' 5" (1.96 m)	231 lb (105 kg)	1993-08-14	Victoria, British Columbia	Penticton (BCHL)	—
35		Nick Stasack	Junior	G	6' 1" (1.85 m)	169 lb (77 kg)	1993-10-18	West Springfield, Massachusetts	Loomis (USHS–CT)	—
40		Cal Petersen	Freshman	G	6' 1" (1.85 m)	182 lb (83 kg)	1994-10-19	Waterloo, Iowa	Waterloo (USHL)	BUF, 129th overall 2013

=== Coaching staff ===
Name	Position	Seasons at Notre Dame	Alma mater
Jeff Jackson	Head coach	10	Michigan State University (1978)
Paul Pooley	Associate head coach	10	Ohio State University (1984)
Andy Slaggert	Assistant coach	22	University of Notre Dame (1989)
Gordon Burnett	Volunteer Assistant Coach	1	The College of St. Scholastica (2006)

== Standings ==
2014–15 Hockey East men's standings
	Conference record							Overall record					
	GP	W	L	T	PTS	GF	GA	GP	W	L	T	GF	GA
#2 Boston University †*	22	14	5	3	31	88	55	41	28	8	5	158	95
#1 Providence	22	13	8	1	27	61	37	41	26	13	2	123	84
#13 Boston College	22	12	7	3	27	60	50	38	21	14	3	107	91
#17 Massachusetts–Lowell	22	11	7	4	26	70	52	39	21	12	6	134	101
Notre Dame	22	10	7	5	25	64	54	42	18	19	5	126	116
Northeastern	22	11	9	2	24	70	69	36	16	16	4	107	107
Vermont	22	10	9	3	23	62	53	41	22	15	4	110	91
New Hampshire	22	10	11	1	21	66	68	40	19	19	2	119	109
Connecticut	22	7	11	4	18	42	74	36	10	19	7	66	111
Maine	22	8	12	2	18	64	74	39	14	22	3	108	127
Merrimack	22	5	14	3	13	38	56	38	16	18	4	81	93
Massachusetts	22	5	16	1	11	59	102	36	11	23	2	99	152
Championship: March 21, 2015 † indicates conference regular season champion; * indicates conference tournament champion Rankings: USCHO.com Top 20 Poll; updated March 9, 2015

== Schedule ==
Date	Time	Opponent^{#}	Rank^{#}	Site	TV	Result	Attendance	Record
Exhibition
October 5	5:00 PM	Waterloo*	#12	Compton Family Ice Arena • Notre Dame, Indiana		L 4–5	3,444	0–0–0
Regular Season
October 10	7:30 PM	RPI*	#12	Compton Family Ice Arena • Notre Dame, Indiana (Ice Breaker Tournament)		L 2–3	5,022	0–1–0
October 12	3:30 PM	Minnesota–Duluth*	#12	Compton Family Ice Arena • Notre Dame, Indiana (Ice Breaker Tournament)		L 0–3	4,468	0–2–0
October 17	7:30 PM	Lake Superior State*		Compton Family Ice Arena • Notre Dame, Indiana	NBCSN	W 5–3	3,760	1–2–0
October 18	6:00 PM	Lake Superior State*		Compton Family Ice Arena • Notre Dame, Indiana	NBCSN	W 5–1	3,692	2–2–0
October 24	7:30 PM	Niagara*		Compton Family Ice Arena • Notre Dame, Indiana		W 6–3	4,194	3–2–0
October 25	7:00 PM	Niagara*		Compton Family Ice Arena • Notre Dame, Indiana	NBCSN	W 7–0	4,446	4–2–0
October 31	8:00 PM	#13 Vermont	#20	Compton Family Ice Arena • Notre Dame, Indiana	NBCSN	W 3–2	3,609	5–2–0 (1–0–0)
November 1	7:00 PM	#13 Vermont	#20	Compton Family Ice Arena • Notre Dame, Indiana		T 2–2 ^{OT}	3,947	5–2–1 (1–0–1)
November 7	8:00 PM	at #1 Minnesota*	#15	Mariucci Arena • Minneapolis, Minnesota	BTN	L 0–5	10,052	5–3–1
November 9	5:00 PM	at #1 Minnesota*	#15	Mariucci Arena • Minneapolis, Minnesota	ESPNU	L 2–4	9,774	5–4–1
November 14	7:00 PM	at Merrimack		Lawler Arena • North Andover, Massachusetts		W 3–2 ^{OT}	2,549	6–4–1 (2–0–1)
November 15	7:00 PM	at Merrimack		Lawler Arena • North Andover, Massachusetts		L 1–4	2,549	6–5–1 (2–1–1)
November 20	7:30 PM	#5 UMass Lowell		Compton Family Ice Arena • Notre Dame, Indiana		L 1–3	3,636	6–6–1 (2–2–1)
November 21	7:30 PM	#5 UMass Lowell		Compton Family Ice Arena • Notre Dame, Indiana	NBCSN	T 2–2 ^{OT}	5,022	6–6–2 (2–2–2)
November 28	7:30 PM	#17 Union*		Compton Family Ice Arena • Notre Dame, Indiana (Shillelagh Tournament)		L 2–3 ^{OT}	5,022	6–7–2
November 29	7:30 PM	Ohio State*		Compton Family Ice Arena • Notre Dame, Indiana (Shillelagh Tournament)		L 1–5	4,789	6–8–2
December 5	7:00 PM	at UMass		Mullins Center • Amherst, Massachusetts		W 7–5	2,744	7–8–2 (3–2–2)
December 6	7:00 PM	at UMass		Mullins Center • Amherst, Massachusetts		W 4–0	2,469	8–8–2 (4–2–2)
December 28	4:00 PM	vs. #6 Miami (OH)*		Germain Arena • Estero, Florida (Florida College Hockey Classic)		W 3–2 ^{OT}	3,529	9–8–2
December 29	7:30 PM	vs. Lake Superior State*		Germain Arena • Estero, Florida (Florida College Hockey Classic)		L 1–2	3,149	9–9–2
January 9	7:30 PM	at Western Michigan*		Lawson Arena • Kalamazoo, Michigan	CBSSN	L 2–4	3,017	9–10–2
January 10	6:00 PM	Western Michigan*		Compton Family Ice Arena • Notre Dame, Indiana	NBCSN	L 3–4	4,938	9–11–2
January 16	7:30 PM	Connecticut		Compton Family Ice Arena • Notre Dame, Indiana	NBCSN	T 3–3 ^{OT}	5,202	9–11–3 (4–2–3)
January 18	2:00 PM	at Connecticut		Webster Bank Arena • Bridgeport, Connecticut		W 6–1	4,597	10–11–3 (5–2–3)
January 23	7:00 PM	at Northeastern		Matthews Arena • Boston, Massachusetts		L 2–3	3,346	10–12–3 (5–3–3)
January 24	7:00 PM	at Northeastern		Matthews Arena • Boston, Massachusetts		L 2–4	2,983	10–13–3 (5–4–3)
January 30	7:30 PM	New Hampshire		Compton Family Ice Arena • Notre Dame, Indiana		L 2–5	5,188	10–14–3 (5–5–3)
January 31	6:30 PM	New Hampshire		Compton Family Ice Arena • Notre Dame, Indiana	NBCSN	W 5–3	4,891	11–14–3 (6–5–3)
February 6	7:00 PM	at Maine		Alfond Arena • Orono, Maine	NESN	T 4–4 ^{OT}	4,045	11–14–4 (6–5–4)
February 7	7:00 PM	at Maine		Alfond Arena • Orono, Maine	FCS	W 5–1	4,350	12–14–4 (7–5–4)
February 13	7:30 PM	#11 Providence		Compton Family Ice Arena • Notre Dame, Indiana	NBCSN	W 2–0	4,562	13–14–4 (8–5–4)
February 14	8:00 PM	#11 Providence		Compton Family Ice Arena • Notre Dame, Indiana	NBCSN	L 2–3	5,002	13–15–4 (8–6–4)
February 20	7:30 PM	at #3 Boston University		Agganis Arena • Boston, Massachusetts		T 2–2 ^{OT}	5,376	13–15–5 (8–6–5)
February 21	7:00 PM	at #3 Boston University		Agganis Arena • Boston, Massachusetts		W 3–2	5,049	14–15–5 (9–6–5)
February 27	7:30 PM	#9 Boston College		Compton Family Ice Arena • Notre Dame, Indiana (Holy War on Ice)	NBCSN	L 0–2	5,022	14–16–5 (9–7–5)
February 28	6:00 PM	#9 Boston College		Compton Family Ice Arena • Notre Dame, Indiana (Holy War on Ice)	NBCSN	W 3–1	4,875	15–16–5 (10–7–5)
Postseason
March 6	7:35 PM	UMass*		Compton Family Ice Arena • Notre Dame, Indiana (Hockey East First Round)		L 3–4 ^{5OT}	3,994	15–17–5
March 7	7:05 PM	UMass*		Compton Family Ice Arena • Notre Dame, Indiana (Hockey East First Round)		W 5–3	4,289	16–17–5
March 8	7:05 PM	UMass*		Compton Family Ice Arena • Notre Dame, Indiana (Hockey East First Round)		W 7–0	3,368	17–17–5
March 13	7:15 PM	at #14 UMass Lowell*		Tsongas Center • Lowell, Massachusetts (Hockey East Quarterfinal)		L 0–5		
March 14	7:00 PM	at #14 UMass Lowell*		Tsongas Center • Lowell, Massachusetts (Hockey East Quarterfinal)		W 4–2		
March 15	4:00 PM	at #14 UMass Lowell*		Tsongas Center • Lowell, Massachusetts (Hockey East Quarterfinal)		L 4–6		
*Non-conference game. ^{#}Rankings from USCHO.com Poll. All times are in Eastern Time.

== Statistics ==
Updated as of March 17, 2015.

Skaters
Player	GP	G	A	Pts
Vince Hinostroza	42	11	33	44
Robbie Russo	40	15	26	41
Mario Lucia	42	21	11	32
Thomas Di Pauli	41	8	21	29
Jordan Gross	42	7	21	28
Anders Bjork	41	7	15	22
Steven Fogarty	39	9	12	21
Sam Herr	42	12	6	18
Austin Wuthrich	37	10	7	17
Jake Evans	41	7	10	17
Peter Schneider	41	7	9	16
Connor Hurley	41	4	10	14
Andy Ryan	42	1	9	10
Luke Ripley	42	2	6	8
Justin Wade	41	1	6	7
Ben Ostlie	24	1	2	3
Ali Thomas	30	0	3	3
Tony Bretzman	17	1	1	2
Dawson Cook	35	1	1	2
Joe Aiken	7	1	0	1
Bo Brauer	2	0	0	0
Nathan Billitier	9	0	0	0
Eric Johnson	18	0	0	0

Goaltenders
Player	GP	GS	TOI	W	L	T	GAA	SV%	SO
Cal Petersen	33	31	1891:36	13	16	3	2.51	.919	4
Chad Katunar	15	11	737:08	5	3	2	3.01	.899	0

== Rankings ==
Poll	Week																							
Poll	Pre	1	2	3	4	5	6	7	8	9	10	11	12	13	14	15	16	17	18	19	20	21	22	23 (Final)
USCHO.com	12	RV	RV	20	15	RV	RV	RV	NR	NR	NR	RV	NR	NR	NR	NR	NR							
USA Today	11	RV	RV	RV	14	RV	NR	NR	NR	NR	NR	NR	NR	NR	NR	NR	NR							
