= 2014–15 Maine Black Bears men's ice hockey season =

- Conference: Hockey East
- Home ice: Alfond Arena

Record
- Overall: 14–22–3 (8–12–2 HEA)
- Home: 8–10–2
- Road: 6–10–1
- Neutral: 1–2–0

Coaches and captains
- Head coach: Red Gendron
- Assistant coaches: Jay Leach; Ben Guite

The 2014–15 Maine Black Bears men's ice hockey team represented the University of Maine during the 2014–15 NCAA Division I men's ice hockey season. The team was coached by Red Gendron, in his 2nd season with the Black Bears. The Black Bears played their home games at Alfond Arena on campus in Orono, Maine, competing in Hockey East.

== Personnel ==
=== Roster ===
As of December 16, 2014.

No.	Nat.	Player	Class	Pos	Height	Weight	DoB	Hometown	Previous team	NHL rights
1		Chris Howat	Sophomore	G	6' 5" (1.96 m)	210 lb (95 kg)	1993-12-16	Bangor, Maine	Bangor (USHS–ME)	—
2		Dan Renouf	Sophomore	D	6' 2" (1.88 m)	205 lb (93 kg)	1994-06-12	Pickering, Ontario	Youngstown (USHL)	—
4		Jake Rutt	Senior	D	6' 2" (1.88 m)	210 lb (95 kg)	1991-04-26	Scarborough, Maine	New Hampshire (EJHL)	—
5		Andrew Cerretani	Junior	F	5' 10" (1.78 m)	180 lb (82 kg)	1992-07-08	Pelham, New Hampshire	Lawrence (USHS–MA)	—
10		Ben Hutton	Junior	D	6' 3" (1.91 m)	200 lb (91 kg)	1993-04-20	Prescott, Ontario	Nepean (CCHL)	VAN, 147th overall 2012
11		Steven Swavely	Junior	F	6' 1" (1.85 m)	190 lb (86 kg)	1991-12-04	Reading, Pennsylvania	Jersey (EJHL)	—
12		Bill Norman	Junior (RS)	D	5' 10" (1.78 m)	175 lb (79 kg)	1992-06-27	Stockholm, Sweden	Rochester-Mayo (USHS–MN)	—
13		Nolan Vesey	Freshman	F	6' 2" (1.88 m)	210 lb (95 kg)	1995-03-28	North Reading, Massachusetts	South Shore (USPHL)	TOR, 158th overall 2014
14		Cedric Lacroix	Freshman	F	6' 1" (1.85 m)	180 lb (82 kg)	1994-11-02	Shefford, Quebec	Sioux City (USHL)	—
17		Andrew Tegeler	Senior	F	6' 2" (1.88 m)	200 lb (91 kg)	1992-08-05	Sewell, New Jersey	Vernon (BCHL)	—
21		Cam Brown	Sophomore	F	5' 7" (1.7 m)	150 lb (68 kg)	1993-03-25	Natick, Massachusetts	Youngstown (USHL)	—
22		Stu Higgins	Senior	F	5' 9" (1.75 m)	175 lb (79 kg)	1992-05-08	Troy, Michigan	Youngstown (USHL)	—
25		Eric Schurhamer	Sophomore	D	5' 10" (1.78 m)	190 lb (86 kg)	1993-12-14	Saint Paul, Minnesota	Lincoln (USHL)	—
27		Jack Musil	Freshman	F	6' 1" (1.85 m)	180 lb (82 kg)	1993-08-22	Hull, England	New England Wolves (Midget AAA)	—
28		Will Merchant	Junior	F	6' 1" (1.85 m)	190 lb (86 kg)	1994-01-12	Eagan, Minnesota	Eagan (USHS–MN)	—
29		Connor Leen	Senior	F	5' 9" (1.75 m)	165 lb (75 kg)	1992-06-03	Chester, New York	New Jersey (EJHL)	—
30		Sean Romeo	Freshman	G	6' 1" (1.85 m)	165 lb (75 kg)	1994-11-07	Cary, North Carolina	Youngstown (USHL)	—
31		Nik Nugnes	Freshman	G	6' 3" (1.91 m)	200 lb (91 kg)	1993-06-07	West Barnstable, Massachusetts	Connecticut (EHL)	—
36		Matt Morris	Junior	G	5' 10" (1.78 m)	185 lb (84 kg)	1993-05-16	Ridgewood, New Jersey	Dubuque (USHL)	—
39		Liam Pecararo	Freshman	F	5' 11" (1.8 m)	164 lb (74 kg)	1996-04-06	Canton, Massachusetts	Waterloo (USHL)	—
44		Conor Riley	Junior	F/D	6' 0" (1.83 m)	185 lb (84 kg)	1992-10-08	Massena, New York	Valley (EJHL)	—
47		Mark Hamilton	Freshman	D	6' 3" (1.91 m)	220 lb (100 kg)	1994-01-03	Winthrop, Massachusetts	Vernon (BCHL)	—
59		Brady Campbell	Sophomore	F	5' 11" (1.8 m)	180 lb (82 kg)	1992-06-10	Blenheim, Ontario	Elmira (GOJHL)	—
67		Malcolm Hayes	Freshman	D	6' 2" (1.88 m)	220 lb (100 kg)	1995-04-21	Atlanta, Georgia	Cushing (USHS–MA)	—
88		Brian Morgan	Sophomore	F	6' 0" (1.83 m)	180 lb (82 kg)	1994-04-01	Windham, New Hampshire	Muskegon (USHL)	—
89		Blaine Byron	Sophomore	F	6' 0" (1.83 m)	170 lb (77 kg)	1995-02-21	Osgoode, Ontario	Smiths Falls (CCHL)	PIT, 179th overall 2013
94		Devin Shore	Junior	F	6' 1" (1.85 m)	185 lb (84 kg)	1994-07-19	Ajax, Ontario	Whitby (OJHL)	DAL, 61st overall 2012

=== Coaching staff ===
Name	Position	Seasons at Maine	Alma mater
Red Gendron	Head coach	2	University of Maine (1993)
Jay Leach	Associate head coach	2	University of New Haven (1978)
Ben Guite	Assistant coach	2	University of Maine (2000)

== Standings ==
2014–15 Hockey East men's standings
	Conference record							Overall record					
	GP	W	L	T	PTS	GF	GA	GP	W	L	T	GF	GA
#2 Boston University †*	22	14	5	3	31	88	55	41	28	8	5	158	95
#1 Providence	22	13	8	1	27	61	37	41	26	13	2	123	84
#13 Boston College	22	12	7	3	27	60	50	38	21	14	3	107	91
#17 Massachusetts–Lowell	22	11	7	4	26	70	52	39	21	12	6	134	101
Notre Dame	22	10	7	5	25	64	54	42	18	19	5	126	116
Northeastern	22	11	9	2	24	70	69	36	16	16	4	107	107
Vermont	22	10	9	3	23	62	53	41	22	15	4	110	91
New Hampshire	22	10	11	1	21	66	68	40	19	19	2	119	109
Connecticut	22	7	11	4	18	42	74	36	10	19	7	66	111
Maine	22	8	12	2	18	64	74	39	14	22	3	108	127
Merrimack	22	5	14	3	13	38	56	38	16	18	4	81	93
Massachusetts	22	5	16	1	11	59	102	36	11	23	2	99	152
Championship: March 21, 2015 † indicates conference regular season champion; * indicates conference tournament champion Rankings: USCHO.com Top 20 Poll; updated March 9, 2015

== Schedule ==
Date	Time	Opponent^{#}	Rank^{#}	Site	TV	Result	Attendance	Record
Exhibition
October 5	4:00 PM	New Brunswick*		Alfond Arena • Orono, Maine		W 8–3	4,290	0–0–0
Regular Season
October 10	12:00 AM	at Alaska Anchorage*		Sullivan Arena • Anchorage, Alaska (Kendall Hockey Classic)		L 1–3	2,656	0–1–0
October 11	8:00 PM	vs. Alaska*		Sullivan Arena • Anchorage, Alaska (Kendall Hockey Classic)		L 2–5	2,441	0–2–0
October 17	7:30 PM	#2 Union*		Alfond Arena • Orono, Maine	FCS	L 0–3	4,895	0–3–0
October 18	7:00 PM	#2 Union*		Alfond Arena • Orono, Maine		L 2–5	4,657	0–4–0
October 24	7:00 PM	#20 Alaska Anchorage*		Alfond Arena • Orono, Maine		W 3–1	3,599	1–4–0
October 25	7:00 PM	#20 Alaska Anchorage*		Alfond Arena • Orono, Maine		T 3–3 ^{OT}	4,010	1–4–1
October 31	7:00 PM	UMass		Alfond Arena • Orono, Maine		W 6–5 ^{OT}	3,378	2–4–1 (1–0–0)
November 1	7:00 PM	UMass		Alfond Arena • Orono, Maine	FCS	W 3–2	3,706	3–4–1 (2–0–0)
November 7	7:00 PM	at #14 Vermont		Gutterson Fieldhouse • Burlington, Vermont		L 3–4 ^{OT}	4,007	3–5–1 (2–1–0)
November 8	7:00 PM	at #14 Vermont		Gutterson Fieldhouse • Burlington, Vermont		L 1–4	4,007	3–6–1 (2–2–0)
November 14	7:30 PM	#3 Boston University		Alfond Arena • Orono, Maine	FCS	L 1–3	4,919	3–7–1 (2–3–0)
November 21	7:30 PM	at #3 Boston University		Agganis Arena • Boston, Massachusetts		L 2–3 ^{OT}	5,291	3–8–1 (2–4–0)
November 22	7:00 PM	at #12 Boston College		Kelley Rink • Boston, Massachusetts		L 1–4	6,773	3–9–1 (2–5–0)
November 28	7:00 PM	#13 Vermont*		Alfond Arena • Orono, Maine		L 3–6	3,707	3–10–1
November 29	7:00 PM	#13 Vermont*		Alfond Arena • Orono, Maine		L 1–4	4,148	3–11–1
December 8	8:00 PM	at #7 UMass Lowell		Tsongas Center • Lowell, Massachusetts	NBCSN	L 2–3 ^{OT}	4,497	3–12–1 (2–6–0)
December 12	7:00 PM	vs. New Hampshire*		Verizon Wireless Arena • Manchester, New Hampshire		W 5–2	5,028	4–12–1
December 13	7:30 PM	vs. New Hampshire*		Cross Insurance Arena • Portland, Maine		L 4–7	6,183	4–13–1
January 2	7:00 PM	Canisius*		Alfond Arena • Orono, Maine		W 4–1	3,559	5–13–1
January 3	7:00 PM	Canisius*		Alfond Arena • Orono, Maine		W 3–1	3,910	6–13–1
January 9	7:00 PM	at UMass*		Mullins Center • Amherst, Massachusetts		L 2–3	1,441	6–14–1
January 10	7:00 PM	at UMass*		Mullins Center • Amherst, Massachusetts		W 3–0	1,588	7–14–1
January 16	7:00 PM	#6 UMass Lowell		Alfond Arena • Orono, Maine		L 0–2	3,820	7–15–1 (2–7–0)
January 18	3:00 PM	#17 Boston College		Alfond Arena • Orono, Maine	FCS	W 4–2	4,215	8–15–1 (3–7–0)
January 23	7:00 PM	New Hampshire		Alfond Arena • Orono, Maine		W 6–4	5,084	9–15–1 (4–7–0)
January 24	7:00 PM	at New Hampshire		Whittemore Center • Durham, New Hampshire	FCS	W 4–0	6,501	10–15–1 (5–7–0)
January 30	7:30 PM	Connecticut		Alfond Arena • Orono, Maine	FCS	L 1–2	3,717	10–16–1 (5–8–0)
February 1	2:00 PM	at Connecticut		XL Center • Hartford, Connecticut		T 2–2 ^{OT}	5,211	10–16–2 (5–8–1)
February 6	7:00 PM	Notre Dame		Alfond Arena • Orono, Maine	NESN	T 4–4 ^{OT}	4,045	10–16–3 (5–8–2)
February 7	7:00 PM	Notre Dame		Alfond Arena • Orono, Maine	FCS	L 1–5	4,350	10–17–3 (5–9–2)
February 13	7:00 PM	at Merrimack		Lawler Arena • North Andover, Massachusetts		W 4–3	2,374	11–17–3 (6–9–2)
February 14	7:00 PM	at Merrimack		Lawler Arena • North Andover, Massachusetts		W 5–3	2,095	12–17–3 (7–9–2)
February 20	7:30 PM	Northeastern		Alfond Arena • Orono, Maine	FCS	L 4–6	3,866	12–18–3 (7–10–2)
February 21	7:00 PM	Northeastern		Alfond Arena • Orono, Maine		W 6–3	3,786	13–18–3 (8–10–2)
February 27	7:00 PM	at #13 Providence		Schneider Arena • Providence, Rhode Island		L 2–5	2,453	13–19–3 (8–11–2)
February 28	7:00 PM	at #13 Providence		Schneider Arena • Providence, Rhode Island		L 2–5	2,895	13–20–3 (8–12–2)
Postseason
March 6	7:00 PM	at #17 Vermont*		Gutterson Fieldhouse • Burlington, Vermont (Hockey East First Round)		L 2–4	2,482	13–21–3
March 7	7:00 PM	at #17 Vermont*		Gutterson Fieldhouse • Burlington, Vermont (Hockey East First Round)		W 4–2	2,886	14–21–3
March 8	7:00 PM	at #17 Vermont*		Gutterson Fieldhouse • Burlington, Vermont (Hockey East First Round)		L 2–3 ^{OT}	2,622	14–22–3
*Non-conference game. ^{#}Rankings from USCHO.com Poll. All times are in Eastern Time.

== Rankings ==
Poll	Week																							
Poll	Pre	1	2	3	4	5	6	7	8	9	10	11	12	13	14	15	16	17	18	19	20	21	22	23 (Final)
USCHO.com	RV	NR	NR	NR	RV	NR	NR	NR	NR	NR	NR	NR	NR	NR	NR	NR	NR	NR	NR	NR	NR	NR	NR	NR
USA Today	NR	NR	NR	NR	NR	NR	NR	NR	NR	NR	NR	NR	NR	NR	NR	NR	NR	NR	NR	NR	NR	NR	NR	NR
