= 2015 Hockey East men's ice hockey tournament =

2015 Hockey East Men's ice hockey tournament
- Dates: March 6–21, 2015
- Teams: 12
- Finals site: TD Garden; Boston
- Champions: Boston University (8th title)
- Winning coach: David Quinn (1st title)
- MVP: Jack Eichel (BU)
- Hockey East Men's Ice Hockey Tournaments

The 2015 Hockey East Men's Ice Hockey Tournament was the 31st tournament in the history of the conference. It was played between March 6 and March 21, 2015, at campus locations and at the TD Garden in Boston, Massachusetts. The Boston University Terriers defeated the UMass Lowell River Hawks by a score of 5–3 to earn their 8th Hockey East championship in school history and earn Hockey East's automatic bid into the 2015 NCAA Division I Men's Ice Hockey Tournament. Jack Eichel was named tournament MVP.

The tournament is the 31st in league history.

== Format ==
With the addition of the UConn Huskies to Hockey East, the tournament was reformatted to include all twelve teams in the conference. Seeds 1–4 earned a first-round bye, and seeds 5–12 played a best-of-three Opening Round played on campus locations. Winners advanced to play the 1–4 seeds in the best-of-three Quarterfinals on campus locations. Winners of those series played in a single-game Semifinal, and those winners faced off in a single-game Championship Final, both at the TD Garden.

=== Regular season standings ===
Note: GP = Games played; W = Wins; L = Losses; T = Ties; PTS = Points; GF = Goals For; GA = Goals Against

2014–15 Hockey East men's standings
	Conference record							Overall record					
	GP	W	L	T	PTS	GF	GA	GP	W	L	T	GF	GA
#2 Boston University †*	22	14	5	3	31	88	55	41	28	8	5	158	95
#1 Providence	22	13	8	1	27	61	37	41	26	13	2	123	84
#13 Boston College	22	12	7	3	27	60	50	38	21	14	3	107	91
#17 Massachusetts–Lowell	22	11	7	4	26	70	52	39	21	12	6	134	101
Notre Dame	22	10	7	5	25	64	54	42	18	19	5	126	116
Northeastern	22	11	9	2	24	70	69	36	16	16	4	107	107
Vermont	22	10	9	3	23	62	53	41	22	15	4	110	91
New Hampshire	22	10	11	1	21	66	68	40	19	19	2	119	109
Connecticut	22	7	11	4	18	42	74	36	10	19	7	66	111
Maine	22	8	12	2	18	64	74	39	14	22	3	108	127
Merrimack	22	5	14	3	13	38	56	38	16	18	4	81	93
Massachusetts	22	5	16	1	11	59	102	36	11	23	2	99	152
Championship: March 21, 2015 † indicates conference regular season champion; * indicates conference tournament champion Rankings: USCHO.com Top 20 Poll; updated March 9, 2015

== Bracket ==
Teams are reseeded after the Opening Round and Quarterfinals

Opening Round; March 6–8
5	Notre Dame	3	5	7
12	Massachusetts	4*****	3	0
6	Northeastern	2	1	–
11	Merrimack	3*	2**	–
7	Vermont	4	2	3*
10	Maine	2	4	2
8	New Hampshire	5	2	–
9	Connecticut	2	0	–

Quarterfinals; March 13–15
1	Boston University	6	5	–
11	Merrimack	2	0	–
2	Providence	1	2	1
8	New Hampshire	2*	1	2*
3	Boston College	4	1	0
7	Vermont	2	3	1
4	Massachusetts–Lowell	5	2	6
5	Notre Dame	0	4	4

Semifinals; March 20
1	Boston University	4
8	New Hampshire	1
4	Massachusetts–Lowell	4
7	Vermont	1

Championship; March 21
1	Boston University	5
4	Massachusetts–Lowell	3

Note: * denotes overtime period(s)

== Results ==
=== Opening Round ===
==== (5) Notre Dame vs. (12) Massachusetts ====
March 6	Notre Dame	3 - 4	5OT	Massachusetts	Compton Family Ice Arena	Recap
(Evans, Russo) Sam Herr - 09:39		First period		No scoring
(Russo) Vinnie Hinostroza - 09:19 (Russo, Bjork) Steven Fogarty - PP - 14:24		Second period		11:42 - PP - Steven Iacobellis (Montour, Lee); 15:39 - Steven Iacobellis (Walsh, Pigozzi); 19:58 - PP - Troy Power (Vatrano, Montour)
No scoring		Third period		No scoring
No scoring		Fifth overtime period		11:42 - GW - Shane Walsh (Kravchenko, Montour)
( 87 saves / 91 shots ) Cal Petersen		Goalie stats		Steve Mastalerz ( 75 saves / 78 shots )

March 7	Notre Dame	5 - 3	Massachusetts	Compton Family Ice Arena	Recap
(Ripley, Ryan) Mario Lucia - 03:09		First period	10:07 - Frank Vatrano (Montour, Kravchenko)
(Di Pauli, Russo) Peter Schneider - 11:51		Second period	03:41 - Shane Walsh (Pigozzi, Iacobellis)
(Di Pauli, Russo) Vinnie Hinostroza - PP - 01:02 (Lucia, Bjork) Vinnie Hinostroza - GW - 04:00 (Di Pauli, Schneider) Steven Fogarty - 04:38		Third period	16:15 - SH - Riley McDougall (Kravchenko)
( 22 saves / 25 shots ) Cal Petersen		Goalie stats	Steve Mastalerz ( 16 saves / 21 shots ) / Henry Dill ( 7 saves / 7 shots )

March 8	Notre Dame	7 - 0	Massachusetts	Compton Family Ice Arena	Recap
(Schneider, Ryan) Thomas Di Pauli - GW - 00:48		First period	No scoring
(Schneider, Ryan) Thomas Di Pauli - 06:42 (unassisted) Steven Fogarty - 11:04 (Wade, Russo) Connor Hurley - 11:18 (Hinostroza, Lucia) Luke Ripley - 18:47 (Gross, Hinostroza) Robbie Russo - PP - 19:08		Second period	No scoring
(Schneider, Fogarty) Austin Wuthrich - 08:05		Third period	No scoring
( 23 saves / 23 shots ) Cal Petersen		Goalie stats	Steve Mastalerz ( 16 saves / 18 shots ) / Henry Dill ( 9 saves / 14 shots )

Notre Dame won series 2–1

==== (6) Northeastern vs. (11) Merrimack ====
March 6	Northeastern	2 - 3	OT	Merrimack	Matthews Arena	Recap
No Scoring		First period		13:48 - Justin Hussar (Biega, Hennig)
No scoring		Second period		18:10 - Jace Hennig (Lashyn, Tibbet)
(Szmatula, Benning) Zach Aston-Reese - 04:07 (Roy, Benning) Mike McMurtry - PP - 09:46		Third period		No scoring
No scoring		First overtime period		02:24 - GW SH - Jace Hennig (Lashyn, Tibbet)
( 26 saves / 29 shots ) Clay Witt		Goalie stats		Rasmus Tirronen ( 36 saves / 38 shots )

March 7	Northeastern	1 - 2	2OT	Merrimack	Matthews Arena	Recap
No Scoring		First period		No scoring
(Stevens, Snydeman) Zach Aston-Reese - PP - 12:19		Second period		16:32 - PP - Jace Hennig (Biega, Kolomatis)
No scoring		Third period		No scoring
No scoring		Second overtime period		15:42 - GW PP - Mathieu Tibbet (Hennig, Biega)
( 47 saves / 49 shots ) Clay Witt		Goalie stats		Rasmus Tirronen ( 63 saves / 64 shots )

Merrimack won series 2–0

==== (7) Vermont vs. (10) Maine ====
March 6	Vermont	4 - 2	Maine	Gutterson Fieldhouse	Recap
No Scoring		First period	12:42 - Jake Rutt (Brown, Byron)
(Fallon, Bradley) Alexx Privitera - PP - 18:41		Second period	No scoring
(Paliotta, Petruzzelli) Jarrid Privitera - 09:40 (Shaw, Fallon) Brendan Bradley - GW - 17:53 (Bradley, A. Privitera) Brady Shaw - EN - 18:27		Third period	06:55 - PP - Will Merchant (Vesey, Hutton)
( 23 saves / 25 shots ) Mike Santaguida		Goalie stats	Matt Morris ( 26 saves / 29 shots )

March 7	Vermont	2 - 4	Maine	Gutterson Fieldhouse	Recap
(Paliotta, Luukko) Colin Markison - 07:46		First period	00:55 - Cédric Lacroix (Swavely, Rutt)
(Shaw, A. Privitera) Brendan Bradley - 08:51		Second period	00:36 - Connor Leen (Brown, Byron); 16:16 - GW - Connor Leen (Byron, Norman)
No scoring		Third period	11:41 - Brian Morgan (Lacroix, Swavely)
( 24 saves / 28 shots ) Mike Santaguida		Goalie stats	Sean Romeo ( 21 saves / 23 shots )

March 8	Vermont	3 - 2	OT	Maine	Gutterson Fieldhouse	Recap
(Bradley, Paliotta) Brady Shaw - PP - 11:25		First period		No scoring
(Markison, Paliotta) Kevin Irwin - 08:51		Second period		No scoring
No scoring		Third period		02:05 - Ben Hutton (Renouf, Vesey); 15:19 - Devin Shore (Swavely, Merchant)
(Petruzzelli, Luukko) Jonathan Turk - 16:05		First overtime period		No scoring
( 37 saves / 39 shots ) Mike Santaguida		Goalie stats		Sean Romeo ( 27 saves / 30 shots )

Vermont won series 2–1

==== (8) New Hampshire vs. (9) Connecticut ====
March 6	New Hampshire	5 - 2	Connecticut	Whittemore Center	Recap
(Correale, Pesce) Tyler Kelleher - 04:38 (Willows, Thrush) Grayson Downing - PP - 05:48		First period	No scoring
(Downing, Pesce) Matt Willows - GW PP - 08:12 (Correale, Marks) Tyler Kelleher - PP - 08:32		Second period	13:32 - Spencer Naas (Pauly, Norris)
(Cleland) Grayson Downing - EN - 19:15		Third period	09:39 - Joey Ferriss (Sharib, Tyson)
( 20 saves / 22 shots ) Daniel Tirone		Goalie stats	Robert Nichols ( 28 saves / 32 shots )

March 7	New Hampshire	2 - 0	Connecticut	Whittemore Center	Recap
No Scoring		First period	No scoring
No scoring		Second period	No scoring
(Hill, Quast) Kyle Smith - GW - 11:02 (Willows) Grayson Downing - 19:13		Third period	No scoring
( 19 saves / 19 shots ) Daniel Tirone		Goalie stats	Robert Nichols ( 42 saves / 44 shots )

New Hampshire won series 2–0

=== Quarterfinals ===
==== (1) Boston University vs. (11) Merrimack ====
March 13	Boston University	6 - 2	Merrimack	Agganis Arena	Recap
(Fortunato, Hickey) Robbie Baillargeon - PP - 09:44		First period	08:11 - Jace Hennig (Scotti)
(Rodrigues, Eichel) Danny O'Regan - 07:23 (Rodrigues) Jack Eichel - GW - 14:11 (Grzelcyk, Diffley) Evan Rodrigues - 17:35 (Diffley, Baillargeon) Matt Lane - 18:49		Second period	No scoring
(Rodrigues, Oksanen) Jack Eichel - 09:23		Third period	10:20 - Jace Hennig (unassisted)
( 17 saves / 19 shots ) Matt O'Connor		Goalie stats	Rasmus Tirronen ( 40 saves / 46 shots )

March 14	Boston University	5 - 0	Merrimack	Agganis Arena	Recap
No Scoring		First period	No scoring
(Eichel, O'Connor) Cason Hohmann - GW SH - 04:11 (Rodrigues, O'Regan) Ahti Oksanen - PP - 05:42 (Fortunato, Eichel) Danny O'Regan - PP - 17:40		Second period	No scoring
(Eichel) Matt Grzelcyk - SH EN - 15:39 (Diffley) Cason Hohmann - SH EN - 19:35		Third period	No scoring
( 26 saves / 26 shots ) Matt O'Connor / ( 1 saves / 1 shots ) Anthony Moccia		Goalie stats	Rasmus Tirronen ( 50 saves / 53 shots )

Boston University won series 2–0

==== (2) Providence vs. (8) New Hampshire ====
March 13	Providence	1 - 2	OT	New Hampshire	Schneider Arena	Recap
No Scoring		First period		No scoring
No scoring		Second period		No scoring
(Florentino, Parisi) Steven McParland - 10:23		Third period		18:17 - PP - Tyler Kelleher (Poturalski, Cleland)
No scoring		First overtime period		05:18 - GW - Grayson Downing (Willows, Thrush)
( 27 saves / 29 shots ) Jon Gillies		Goalie stats		Daniel Tirone ( 30 saves / 33 shots )

March 14	Providence	2 - 1	New Hampshire	Schneider Arena	Recap
No Scoring		First period	No scoring
(Saracino, Gilmour) Mark Jankowski - PP - 01:58 (Mauermann, Mingoia) John Gilmour - GW PP - 03:17		Second period	05:53 - EA - Grayson Downing (Kelleher, Willows)
No scoring		Third period	No scoring
( 35 saves / 36 shots ) Jon Gillies		Goalie stats	Daniel Tirone ( 30 saves / 32 shots )

March 15	Providence	1 - 2	OT	New Hampshire	Schneider Arena	Recap
No Scoring		First period		No scoring
No scoring		Second period		07:06 - Grayson Downing (Eiserman, Foegele)
(Acciari, Tanev) Nick Saracino - 01:20		Third period		No scoring
No scoring		First overtime period		12:43 - GW - Jay Camper (Pesce, Eiserman)
( 26 saves / 28 shots ) Jon Gillies		Goalie stats		Daniel Tirone ( 30 saves / 31 shots )

New Hampshire won series 2–1

==== (3) Boston College vs. (7) Vermont ====
March 13	Boston College	4 - 2	Vermont	Conte Forum	Recap
(Matheson, Cangelosi) Noah Hanifin - 09:38		First period	No scoring
(unassisted) Zach Sanford - 01:15 (Hanifin, Matheson) Zach Sanford - GW - 03:20 (Matheson, Doherty) Ryan Fitzgerald - GW - 04:08		Second period	04:58 - Brady Shaw (A. Privitera); 08:07 - Brendan Bradley (Pattyn, Fallon)
No scoring		Third period	No scoring
( 32 saves / 34 shots ) Thatcher Demko		Goalie stats	Mike Santaguida ( 17 saves / 21 shots ) / Brody Hoffman ( 12 saves / 12 shots )

March 14	Boston College	1 - 3	Vermont	Conte Forum	Recap
No Scoring		First period	08:54 - PP - Brady Shaw (Bradley, A. Privitera); 16:36 - GW PP - Brady Shaw (Paliotta, Fallon)
(Matheson) Ryan Fitzgerald - PP - 14:14		Second period	No scoring
No scoring		Third period	18:39 - EN - Brendan Bradley (Shaw, Pattyn)
( 22 saves / 24 shots ) Thatcher Demko		Goalie stats	Brody Hoffman ( 39 saves / 40 shots )

March 15	Boston College	0 - 1	Vermont	Conte Forum	Recap
No Scoring		First period	No scoring
No scoring		Second period	No scoring
No scoring		Third period	02:53 - GW - Jarrid Privitera (A. Privitera)
( 22 saves / 23 shots ) Thatcher Demko		Goalie stats	Brody Hoffman ( 36 saves / 36 shots )

Vermont won series 2–1

==== (4) Massachusetts–Lowell vs. (5) Notre Dame ====
March 13	Massachusetts–Lowell	5 - 0	Notre Dame	Tsongas Center	Recap
(Louria, Kapla) C. J. Smith - GW - 01:02 (McGrath, Colantone) Terrence Wallin - 08:12 (Kamrass, Mueller) Evan Campbell - 17:48		First period	No scoring
(Smith, Louria) Joe Gambardella - 01:41 (Fallon) A. J. White - 02:46		Second period	No scoring
No scoring		Third period	No scoring
( 21 saves / 21 shots ) Kevin Boyle		Goalie stats	Cal Petersen ( 17 saves / 22 shots ) / Chad Katunar ( 7 saves / 7 shots )

March 14	Massachusetts–Lowell	2 - 4	Notre Dame	Tsongas Center	Recap
(Chapie, Edwardh) Joe Gambardella - PP - 19:11		First period	No scoring
(Zink, Smith) Evan Campbell - PP - 15:37		Second period	11:45 - Sam Herr (Hurley)
No scoring		Third period	04:43 - Anders Bjork (Lucia); 10:30 - GW PP - Mario Lucia (Hinostroza, Gross); 19:52 - EN - Peter Schneider (Fogarty)
( 20 saves / 23 shots ) Kevin Boyle		Goalie stats	Cal Petersen ( 25 saves / 27 shots )

March 15	Massachusetts–Lowell	6 - 4	Notre Dame	Tsongas Center	Recap
(Kapla, Edwardh) C. J. Smith - 03:29 (unassisted) Adam Chapie - SH - 04:17 (Louria, White) Michael Fallon - 12:11 (Gambardella, Edwardh) Zack Kamrass - SH - 17:53		First period	08:54 - EA - Robbie Russo (Gross, Bjork)
(Edwardh, Chapie) Tyler Mueller - GW PP - 05:02 (Louria, White) Zack Kamrass - 18:35		Second period	04:28 - PP - Robbie Russo (Wuthrich, Bjork)
No scoring		Third period	10:12 - Peter Schneider (Ostlie, Russo); 14:59 - Jordan Gross (Schneider, Russo)
( 32 saves / 36 shots ) Kevin Boyle		Goalie stats	Cal Petersen ( 7 saves / 13 shots ) / Chad Katunar ( 4 saves / 4 shots )

Massachusetts–Lowell won series 2–1

=== Semifinals ===
==== (1) Boston University vs. (8) New Hampshire ====
March 20	Boston University	4 - 1	New Hampshire	TD Garden	Recap
(Grzelcyk, MacLeod) Cason Hohmann - 17:38		First period	14:34 - Tyler Kelleher (Poturalski)
(Roberto, Moran) Chase Phelps - GW - 09:53		Second period	No scoring
(Rodrigues, O'Regan) Jack Eichel - 13:45 (Rodrigues) Jack Eichel - EN - 17:33		Third period	No scoring
( 32 saves / 33 shots ) Matt O'Connor		Goalie stats	Daniel Tirone ( 27 saves / 30 shots )

==== (4) Massachusetts–Lowell vs. (7) Vermont ====
March 20	Massachusetts–Lowell	4 - 1	Vermont	TD Garden	Recap
(Zink, Chapie) Michael Kapla - 12:18		First period	11:42 - Kevin Irwin (Turk)
(Fallon, Suter) Michael Louria - GW - 16:10		Second period	No scoring
(Colantone) Terrence Wallin - 08:46 (unassisted) Joe Gambardella - EN - 18:36		Third period	No scoring
( 30 saves / 31 shots ) Kevin Boyle		Goalie stats	Brody Hoffman ( 32 saves / 35 shots )

=== Championship ===
==== (1) Boston University vs. (4) Massachusetts–Lowell ====
March 21	Boston University	5 - 3	Massachusetts–Lowell	TD Garden	Recap
(Eichel, O'Connor) Matt Grzelcyk - PP - 13:08 (Rodrigues, Hickey) Jack Eichel - 15:02		First period	18:10 - Joe Gambardella (Panico, Chapie)
(Greer, Somerby) Cason Hohmann - 05:38 (Grzelcyk, Lane) Nikolas Olsson - GW - 19:15		Second period	No scoring
(Roberto, Grzelcyk) Jack Eichel - 14:43		Third period	06:47 - Michael Kapla (Fallon, Zink); 16:52 - Michael Louria (White, Fallon)
( 22 saves / 25 shots ) Matt O'Connor		Goalie stats	Kevin Boyle ( 19 saves / 24 shots )

== Tournament awards ==
=== All-Tournament Team ===
- F Jack Eichel* (Boston University)
- F Grayson Downing (New Hampshire)
- F Evan Rodrigues (Boston University)
- D Matt Grzelcyk (Boston University)
- D Robbie Russo (Notre Dame)
- G Matt O'Connor (Boston University)

* Tournament MVP(s)
