= 2014–15 Providence Friars men's ice hockey season =

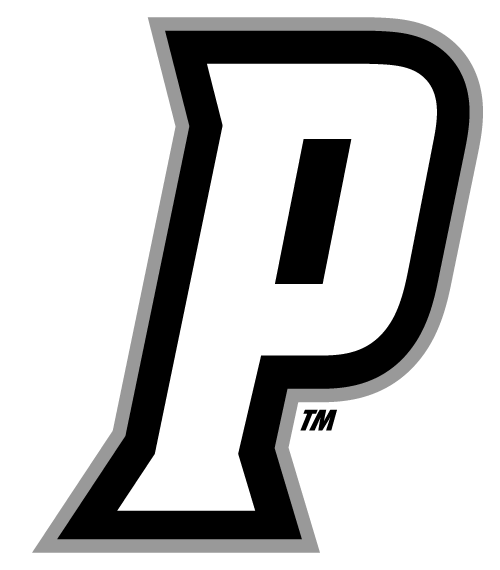

NCAA Division I National champion Catamount Cup champion NCAA Tournament, champion
- Conference: T–2nd Hockey East
- Home ice: Schneider Arena

Rankings
- USCHO.com: #1
- USA Today: #1

Record
- Overall: 26–13–2
- Conference: 13–8–1
- Home: 13–6–0
- Road: 8–7–2
- Neutral: 5–0–0

Coaches and captains
- Head coach: Nate Leaman
- Assistant coaches: Steve Miller; Kris Mayotte

The 2014–15 Providence Friars men's ice hockey team represented Providence College in the 2014–15 NCAA Division I men's ice hockey season. The team was coached by Nate Leaman, in his 4th season with the Friars. The Friars played their home games at Schneider Arena on campus in Providence, Rhode Island, competing in Hockey East. On April 11, 2015, the Friars defeated the Boston University Terriers 4–3 at TD Garden to win the first national championship in program history.

== Personnel ==
=== Roster ===
As of December 15, 2014.

No.	Nat.	Player	Class	Pos	Height	Weight	DoB	Hometown	Previous team	NHL rights
1		Brendan Leahy	Sophomore	G	6' 2" (1.88 m)	210 lb (95 kg)	1993-05-07	Reading, Massachusetts	PAL (USPHL)	—
2		Logan Day	Freshman	D	6' 1" (1.85 m)	200 lb (91 kg)	1994-09-19	Seminole, Florida	South Shore (USPHL)	—
3		John Gilmour	Junior	D	6' 0" (1.83 m)	180 lb (82 kg)	1993-05-17	Montreal, Quebec	Cedar Rapids (USHL)	CGY, 198th overall 2013
4		Mark Adams	Senior	D	6' 3" (1.91 m)	210 lb (95 kg)	1991-05-23	Boxford, Massachusetts	Chicago (USHL)	BUF, 134th overall 2009
5		Kyle McKenzie	Sophomore	D	6' 0" (1.83 m)	187 lb (85 kg)	1993-01-19	Aston, Pennsylvania	Dubuque (USHL)	—
6		Tom Parisi	Junior	D	6' 0" (1.83 m)	195 lb (88 kg)	1993-07-15	Commack, New York	New Hampshire (EJHL)	—
7		Drew Brown	Senior	F	5' 11" (1.8 m)	185 lb (84 kg)	1992-04-28	Grass Lake, Michigan	Kent (USHS–CT)	—
9		Trevor Mingoia	Junior (RS)	F	5' 11" (1.8 m)	190 lb (86 kg)	1992-01-18	Fairport, New York	Tri-City (USHL)	—
10		Mark Jankowski	Junior	F	6' 3" (1.91 m)	186 lb (84 kg)	1994-09-13	Dundas, Ontario	Stanstead (CHS–QB)	CGY, 21st overall 2012
11		Niko Rufo	Sophomore	F	6' 0" (1.83 m)	190 lb (86 kg)	1994-04-06	Stoneham, Massachusetts	Kimball Union (USHS–NH)	—
12		Stefan Demopoulos	Senior	F	5' 8" (1.73 m)	170 lb (77 kg)	1991-01-17	La Mesa, California	Omaha (USHL)	—
13		Paul de Jersey	Junior	F	6' 3" (1.91 m)	205 lb (93 kg)	1992-07-25	West Vancouver, British Columbia	Prince George (BCHL)	—
14		Ross Mauermann	Senior	F	5' 9" (1.75 m)	185 lb (84 kg)	1990-10-19	Janesville, Wisconsin	Janesville (NAHL)	—
15		Steven McParland	Junior	F	5' 11" (1.8 m)	192 lb (87 kg)	1991-02-13	Schreiber, Ontario	Kingston (OJHL)	—
16		Anthony Florentino	Sophomore	D	6' 2" (1.88 m)	210 lb (95 kg)	1995-01-30	West Roxbury, Massachusetts	South Kent (USHS–CT)	BUF, 143rd overall 2013
17		Brooks Behling	Junior	F	6' 1" (1.85 m)	185 lb (84 kg)	1991-01-26	Pittsburgh, Pennsylvania	Amarillo (NAHL)	—
18		Nick Saracino	Junior	F	5' 11" (1.8 m)	185 lb (84 kg)	1992-02-20	St. Louis, Missouri	Cedar Rapids (USHL)	—
19		Jake Walman	Freshman	D	6' 1" (1.85 m)	175 lb (79 kg)	1996-02-20	Toronto, Ontario	Toronto (OJHL)	STL, 82nd overall 2014
20		Shane Luke	Senior	F	5' 11" (1.8 m)	180 lb (82 kg)	1990-06-05	Dauphin, Manitoba	Dauphin (MJHL)	—
21		Kevin Rooney	Junior	F	6' 2" (1.88 m)	190 lb (86 kg)	1993-05-21	Canton, Massachusetts	Berkshire (USHS–MA)	—
22		Brandon Tanev	Junior	F	6' 0" (1.83 m)	180 lb (82 kg)	1991-12-31	Toronto, Ontario	Surrey (BCHL)	—
23		Truman Reed	Freshman	D	6' 2" (1.88 m)	215 lb (98 kg)	1994-07-07	Anchorage, Alaska	Youngstown (USHL)	—
24		Noel Acciari	Junior (RS)	F	5' 11" (1.8 m)	205 lb (93 kg)	1991-12-01	Johnston, Rhode Island	Kent (USHS–CT)	—
25		Robbie Hennessey	Freshman	F	5' 10" (1.78 m)	185 lb (84 kg)	1995-08-25	Garnet Valley, Pennsylvania	Northwood (USHS–NY)	—
26		Brian Pinho	Freshman	F	6' 0" (1.83 m)	171 lb (78 kg)	1995-05-11	North Andover, Massachusetts	Indiana (USHL)	WSH, 174th overall 2013
27		Josh Monk	Sophomore	D	6' 0" (1.83 m)	185 lb (84 kg)	1992-04-05	Langley, British Columbia	West Kelowna (BCHL)	—
28		Alex Cromwell	Freshman	D/F	6' 2" (1.88 m)	207 lb (94 kg)	1994-05-14	McKinney, Texas	Fort McMurray (AJHL)	—
29		Conor MacPhee	Sophomore	F	6' 3" (1.91 m)	200 lb (91 kg)	1992-05-28	Windham, New Hampshire	Middlesex (EJHL)	—
32		Jon Gillies	Junior	G	6' 5" (1.96 m)	215 lb (98 kg)	1994-01-22	South Portland, Maine	Indiana (USHL)	CGY, 75th overall 2012
35		Nick Ellis	Sophomore	G	6' 1" (1.85 m)	180 lb (82 kg)	1994-01-18	Millersville, Maryland	Des Moines (USHL)	—

=== Coaching staff ===
Name	Position	Seasons at Providence	Alma mater
Nate Leaman	Head coach	4	SUNY Cortland (1997)
Steve Miller	Associate Head Coach	1	Saint Mary's University of Minnesota (1988)
Kris Mayotte	Assistant coach	1	Union College (2006)

== Standings ==
2014–15 Hockey East men's standings
	Conference record							Overall record					
	GP	W	L	T	PTS	GF	GA	GP	W	L	T	GF	GA
#2 Boston University †*	22	14	5	3	31	88	55	41	28	8	5	158	95
#1 Providence	22	13	8	1	27	61	37	41	26	13	2	123	84
#13 Boston College	22	12	7	3	27	60	50	38	21	14	3	107	91
#17 Massachusetts–Lowell	22	11	7	4	26	70	52	39	21	12	6	134	101
Notre Dame	22	10	7	5	25	64	54	42	18	19	5	126	116
Northeastern	22	11	9	2	24	70	69	36	16	16	4	107	107
Vermont	22	10	9	3	23	62	53	41	22	15	4	110	91
New Hampshire	22	10	11	1	21	66	68	40	19	19	2	119	109
Connecticut	22	7	11	4	18	42	74	36	10	19	7	66	111
Maine	22	8	12	2	18	64	74	39	14	22	3	108	127
Merrimack	22	5	14	3	13	38	56	38	16	18	4	81	93
Massachusetts	22	5	16	1	11	59	102	36	11	23	2	99	152
Championship: March 21, 2015 † indicates conference regular season champion; * indicates conference tournament champion Rankings: USCHO.com Top 20 Poll; updated March 9, 2015

== Schedule and results ==
Date	Time	Opponent^{#}	Rank^{#}	Site	TV	Result	Attendance	Record
Regular Season
October 10	7:00 PM	at Ohio State*	#3	Value City Arena • Columbus, Ohio		L 4–5 ^{OT}	2,830	0–1–0
October 11	7:00 PM	at Ohio State*	#3	Value City Arena • Columbus, Ohio		W 2–1 ^{OT}	2,881	1–1–0
October 24	8:30 PM	at #3 North Dakota*	#5	Ralph Engelstad Arena • Grand Forks, North Dakota		L 1–6	11,525	1–2–0
October 25	8:00 PM	at #3 North Dakota*	#5	Ralph Engelstad Arena • Grand Forks, North Dakota		T 2–2 ^{OT}	11,676	1–2–1
October 31	7:00 PM	#6 Boston University	#9	Schneider Arena • Providence, Rhode Island		L 1–4	2,978	1–3–1 (0–1–0)
November 1	7:00 PM	at #6 Boston University	#9	Agganis Arena • Boston, Massachusetts		W 2–1	4,648	2–3–1 (1–1–0)
November 7	7:00 PM	Merrimack	#12	Schneider Arena • Providence, Rhode Island		W 3–2	2,647	3–3–1 (2–1–0)
November 8	7:00 PM	at Merrimack	#12	Lawler Arena • North Andover, Massachusetts		L 0–1	2,549	3–4–1 (2–2–0)
November 14	7:00 PM	#10 Vermont	#16	Schneider Arena • Providence, Rhode Island		W 3–0	2,358	4–4–1 (3–2–0)
November 15	7:00 PM	#10 Vermont	#16	Schneider Arena • Providence, Rhode Island		L 1–2	2,230	4–5–1 (3–3–0)
November 22	5:00 PM	at New Hampshire	#19	Whittemore Center • Durham, New Hampshire		W 1–0	6,005	5–5–1 (4–3–0)
November 25	7:00 PM	Army*	#20	Schneider Arena • Providence, Rhode Island		W 3–0	1,968	6–5–1
November 29	7:00 PM	#12 Boston College	#20	Schneider Arena • Providence, Rhode Island		W 1–0	2,978	7–5–1 (5–3–0)
December 3	7:00 PM	at Northeastern	#16	Matthews Arena • Boston, Massachusetts		W 5–1	1,634	8–5–1 (6–3–0)
December 6	4:00 PM	Northeastern	#16	Schneider Arena • Providence, Rhode Island		L 1–2	2,609	8–6–1 (6–4–0)
December 9	7:00 PM	#14 Colgate*	#18	Schneider Arena • Providence, Rhode Island		W 4–3	2,122	9–6–1
December 28	4:00 PM	vs. UMass*	#16	Gutterson Fieldhouse • Burlington, Vermont (Catamount Cup)		W 4–1	4,007	10–6–1
December 29	7:00 PM	at #10 Vermont*	#16	Gutterson Fieldhouse • Burlington, Vermont (Catamount Cup)		W 3–0	4,007	11–6–1
January 3	7:00 PM	Colorado College*	#16	Schneider Arena • Providence, Rhode Island		W 5–4 ^{OT}	2,021	12–6–1
January 4	4:00 PM	Colorado College*	#16	Schneider Arena • Providence, Rhode Island		W 5–3	1,950	13–6–1
January 9	7:00 PM	at Brown*	#14	Meehan Auditorium • Providence, Rhode Island		W 3–2 ^{OT}	1,096	14–6–1
January 10	7:00 PM	Brown*	#14	Schneider Arena • Providence, Rhode Island		L 3–5	2,080	14–7–1
January 13	7:00 PM	at New Hampshire	#14	Whittemore Center • Durham, New Hampshire		L 1–2	3,005	14–8–1 (6–5–0)
January 23	7:00 PM	at #5 UMass Lowell	#18	Tsongas Center • Lowell, Massachusetts	NESN	W 7–3	6,750	15–8–1 (7–5–0)
January 24	7:00 PM	#5 UMass Lowell	#18	Schneider Arena • Providence, Rhode Island		W 4–1	3,033	16–8–1 (8–5–0)
January 30	7:30 PM	at #14 Boston College	#12	Kelley Rink • Boston, Massachusetts		L 2–3	7,389	16–9–1 (8–6–0)
February 4	7:00 PM	at Connecticut	#13	XL Center • Hartford, Connecticut		T 2–2 ^{OT}	4,672	16–9–2 (8–6–1)
February 7	7:00 PM	Connecticut	#13	Schneider Arena • Providence, Rhode Island		W 10–1	3,033	17–9–2 (9–6–1)
February 13	7:30 PM	at Notre Dame	#11	Compton Family Ice Arena • Notre Dame, Indiana	NBCSN	L 0–2	4,562	17–10–2 (9–7–1)
February 14	8:00 PM	at Notre Dame	#11	Compton Family Ice Arena • Notre Dame, Indiana	NBCSN	W 3–2	5,002	18–10–2 (10–7–1)
February 20	7:00 PM	UMass	#12	Schneider Arena • Providence, Rhode Island		W 3–2 ^{OT}	2,445	19–10–2 (11–7–1)
February 21	7:00 PM	at UMass	#12	Mullins Center • Amherst, Massachusetts		L 1–2 ^{OT}	2,615	19–11–2 (11–8–1)
February 27	7:00 PM	Maine	#13	Schneider Arena • Providence, Rhode Island		W 5–2	2,453	20–11–2 (12–8–1)
February 28	7:00 PM	Maine	#13	Schneider Arena • Providence, Rhode Island		W 5–2	2,895	21–11–2 (13–8–1)
Postseason
March 13	7:00 PM	New Hampshire*	#10	Schneider Arena • Providence, Rhode Island (Hockey East Quarterfinal)		L 1–2 ^{OT}	1,325	21–12–2
March 14	7:00 PM	New Hampshire*	#10	Schneider Arena • Providence, Rhode Island (Hockey East Quarterfinal)		W 2–1	1,877	22–12–2
March 15	7:30 PM	New Hampshire*	#10	Schneider Arena • Providence, Rhode Island (Hockey East Quarterfinal)		L 1–2 ^{OT}	1,905	22–13–2
March 28	6:30 PM	vs. #4 Miami (OH)*	#15	Dunkin' Donuts Center • Providence, Rhode Island (NCAA First Round)	ESPNU	W 7–5	7,908	23–13–2
March 29	5:00 PM	vs. #6 Denver*	#15	Dunkin' Donuts Center • Providence, Rhode Island (NCAA Second Round)	ESPNU	W 4–1	6,326	24–13–2
April 9	5:00 PM	vs. #9 Omaha*	#15	TD Garden • Boston, Massachusetts (NCAA Frozen Four)	ESPN2	W 4–1	18,022	25–13–2
April 11	7:30 PM	vs. #2 Boston University*	#15	TD Garden • Boston, Massachusetts (NCAA national championship)	ESPN	W 4–3	18,022	26–13–2
*Non-conference game. ^{#}Rankings from USCHO.com Poll. All times are in Eastern Time.

== Statistics ==
Updated as of April 11, 2015.

Name	Games	Goals	Assists	Points
Nick Saracino	40	14	24	38
Noel Acciari	41	15	17	32
Shane Luke	41	13	19	32
Trevor Mingoia	40	15	16	31
Ross Mauermann	41	11	16	27
Mark Jankowski	37	8	19	27
Brandon Tanev	39	10	13	23
Tom Parisi	39	5	14	19
Brian Pinho	39	6	12	18
Jake Walman	41	1	15	16
Kevin Rooney	41	7	8	15
Anthony Florentino	40	3	12	15
Steven McParland	30	6	7	13
John Gilmour	30	4	7	11
Josh Monk	32	0	6	6
Brooks Behling	14	2	2	4
Kyle McKenzie	39	1	3	4
Mark Adams	32	1	2	3
Logan Day	2	1	0	1
Robbie Hennessey	11	0	1	1
Niko Rufo	11	0	1	1
Stefan Demopoulos	39	0	1	1
Paul de Jersey	1	0	0	0
Conor MacPhee	18	0	0	0

Goaltenders
Player	GP	GS	TOI	W	L	T	GAA	SV%	SO
Brendan Leahy	1	0	3:46	0	0	0	0.00	1.000	0
Jon Gillies	39	39	2300:36	24	13	2	2.01	.930	4
Nick Ellis	5	2	188:50	2	0	0	2.22	.910	1

== Rankings ==
Poll	Week																							
Poll	Pre	1	2	3	4	5	6	7	8	9	10	11	12	13	14	15	16	17	18	19	20	21	22	23 (Final)
USCHO.com	3 (2)	5	5	9	12	16	19	20	16	18	16	14	14	18	12	13	11	12	13	10	10	14	15	1
USA Today	3	5	5	8	10	RV	RV	RV	RV	RV	RV	13	15	RV	11	13	10	12	13	11	10	14	14	1
