= 2014–15 Boston College Eagles men's ice hockey season =

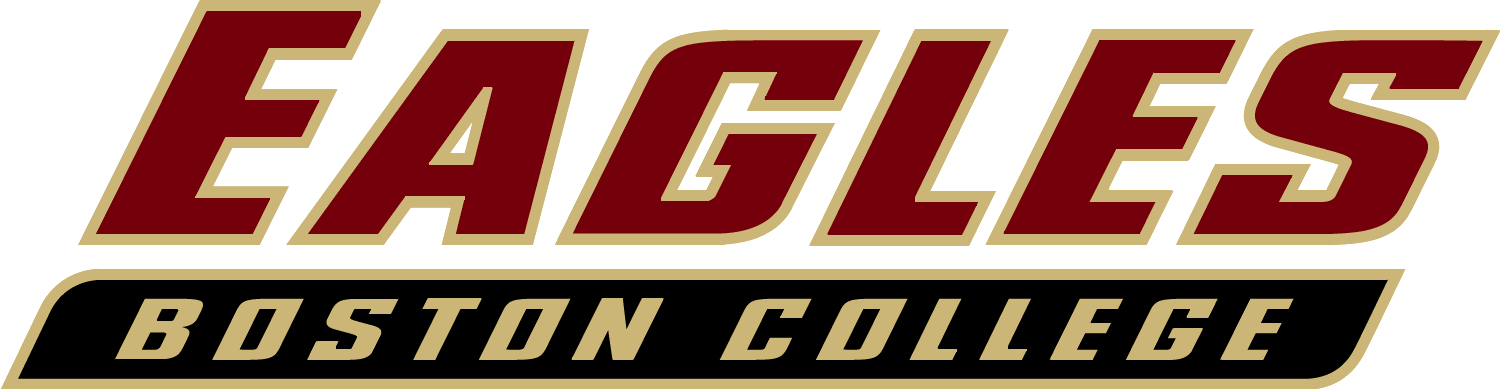

Ledyard Bank Classic Champions, W 3–2 vs. Dartmouth First round NCAA Tournament, L 5–2 vs. Denver
- Conference: Hockey East
- Home ice: Kelley Rink

Rankings
- USCHO.com/CBS College Sports: #13 (Final)
- USA Today/USA Hockey Magazine: #14 (Final)

Record
- Overall: 21–14–3 (12–7–3)
- Home: 11–6–1
- Road: 6–6–2
- Neutral: 4–2–0

Coaches and captains
- Head coach: Jerry York
- Assistant coaches: Greg Brown; Mike Ayers; Marty McInnis
- Captain: Mike Matheson
- Alternate captain(s): Michael Sit, Quinn Smith

The 2014–15 Boston College Eagles men's ice hockey team represented Boston College in the 2014–15 NCAA Division I men's ice hockey season. The team was coached by Jerry York, '67, his twenty-first season behind the bench at Boston College. The Eagles played their home games at Kelley Rink on the campus of Boston College, competing in Hockey East.

The Eagles competed in two tournaments during the 2014–15 season. On January 2–3, the Eagles earned a trophy at the Ledyard Bank Classic, also known as the Dartmouth Showcase Tournament, hosted by Dartmouth College. Because the tournament was not bracketed (i.e. the winners of the first games did not face each other in a championship match), the Eagles won by virtue of points earned; they won both of their games, as Denver and Brown both won one and tied the other, and as host Dartmouth lost both of their games. On February 3 and 23, the Eagles played in the 63rd Annual Beanpot Tournament at the TD Garden in Boston, Massachusetts, losing to Northeastern by a score of 3–2 in the first round and winning the consolation game over Harvard 3–2 in OT, the first time since 2008 that the Eagles did not win the Beanpot tournament.

The Eagles finished 21–14–3, and 12–7–3 in conference play, good for the 3rd seed and a first-round bye entering the 2015 Hockey East tournament. However, they would lose to the Vermont Catamounts during the best-of-three quarterfinals in three games at home, marking the second year in a row in which the Eagles did not advance to at least the semifinals. The Eagles qualified for the 2015 NCAA tournament and were placed in the east regional at Providence. They lost to Denver 5–2 in the first round.

== Previous season recap ==
The Eagles entered the 2014–15 season following a Frozen Four loss to Union College in the NCAA tournament, and a quarterfinals loss to Notre Dame in the Hockey East Tournament. The Eagles did capture three trophies during the 2013–14 season, finishing with a strong 28–8–4 record and 16–2–2 in conference play, good for the Hockey East regular season title, as well as their fifth consecutive Beanpot championship in a 4–1 win over Northeastern. Junior Johnny Gaudreau won numerous accolades including the 2014 Hobey Baker Award after a fantastic league-leading 36 goal, 44 assist, 80 point season. He chose to forgo his senior year of eligibility to enter the NHL with the Calgary Flames.

== Offseason ==
Four Senior Eagles graduated in May: Captain Patrick Brown – F, Assistant Captain Bill Arnold – F, Assistant Captain Isaac MacLeod – D, and Kevin Hayes – F.

Junior forward Johnny Gaudreau decided to forgo his senior year of eligibility to enter the NHL, signing with his drafted team, the Calgary Flames.

Junior defensemen Mike Matheson was named Captain, with seniors Quinn Smith and Michael Sit named Assistant Captains for the 2014–15 season.

On June 4, sophomore forward Evan Richardson transferred to UConn after receiving limited playing time in his freshman year, joining former BC Assistant Coach, Mike Cavanaugh, head coach of the Huskies.

On June 28, goalie Thatcher Demko was drafted 36th overall by the Vancouver Canucks in the 2014 NHL entry draft.

On August 12, graduated defenseman Isaac MacLeod signed a contract with the Elmira Jackals of the ECHL.

On August 16, York announced that incoming-freshman Sonny Milano decided to forgo an NCAA career at Boston College, opting to sign directly with his drafted team, the Columbus Blue Jackets.

On August 20, graduated forward Kevin Hayes signed an entry-level deal with the New York Rangers. Having chosen not to sign with his drafted team, the Chicago Black Hawks will receive a compensatory second-round draft pick in the 2015 NHL entry draft.

== Recruiting ==
Boston College added three freshmen for the 2014–15 season: two forwards, and one defensemen.

- Noah Hanifin, D – Along with being the youngest player in the history of BC's hockey program, Hanifin is also one of the most highly touted recruits in college hockey. He is a point-producing defensemen, scoring 45 points in 59 games with the US National Development Team, splitting time between the U-17 team and the U-18 team. He has the potential to be a top 5 pick in the 2015 NHL entry draft, when he becomes eligible.
- Zachary Sanford, F – Sanford played for the Waterloo Blackhawks of the USHL, scoring 35 points in 52 games. He was taken 61st overall in the 2nd round of the 2013 NHL entry draft by the Washington Capitals.
- Alex Tuch, F – Known as a "big power winger", Tuch is another player out of the US National Development Team, where he scored 64 points in 61 games. He was selected 18th overall in the 1st round of the 2014 NHL entry draft by the Minnesota Wild.
- Hanifin and Tuch were on the United States team that won a gold medal at the IIHF World U18 Championship, or otherwise known as the U-18 World Juniors.

| Player | Position | Nationality | Notes |
|---|---|---|---|
| Noah Hanifin | Defense | United States | Norwood, MA; Played for the US National Development Team. Will be eligible for the 2015 NHL Draft. |
| Zachary Sanford | Forward | United States | Auburn, NH; Selected 61st Overall by WAS in the 2013 Draft. |
| Alex Tuch | Forward | United States | Bladwinsville, NY; Selected 18th Overall by MIN in the 2014 Draft. |

== 2014–2015 roster ==
=== Departures from 2013–14 team ===
- Kevin Hayes, F – Graduation - Signed an entry-level contract with the New York Rangers.
- Isaac MacLeod, D – Graduation – Signed with the Elmira Jackals of the ECHL.
- Bill Arnold, F – Graduation – Signed an entry-level contract with his draft team, the Calgary Flames.
- Patrick Brown, F – Graduation - Signed a tryout contract with the Carolina Hurricanes.
- Johnny Gaudreau, F – Chose to forgo his senior year of eligibility to enter the NHL with his drafted team the Calgary Flames.
- Evan Richardson, F – Transferred to the University of Connecticut.

=== 2014–15 Eagles ===
As of March 16, 2015.

| No. | Nat. | Player | Class | Pos | Height | Weight | DoB | Hometown | Previous team | NHL rights |
|---|---|---|---|---|---|---|---|---|---|---|
| 1 | | Brian Billett | Senior | G | 6' 0" (1.83 m) | 184 lb (83 kg) | 1992-03-19 | Brunswick, Maine | NH Junior Monarchs (EJHL) | — |
| 2 | | Scott Savage | Sophomore | D | 6' 1" (1.85 m) | 185 lb (84 kg) | 1995-04-11 | San Clemente, California | US NTDP (USHL) | — |
| 3 | | Ian McCoshen | Sophomore | D | 6' 3" (1.91 m) | 206 lb (93 kg) | 1995-08-05 | Faribault, Minnesota | Waterloo (USHL) | FLA, 31st overall 2013 |
| 4 | | Teddy Doherty | Junior | D | 5' 9" (1.75 m) | 178 lb (81 kg) | 1994-04-25 | Hopkinton, Massachusetts | Dubuque (USHL) | — |
| 5 | | Michael Matheson (C) | Junior | D | 6' 2" (1.88 m) | 189 lb (86 kg) | 1994-02-27 | Pointe-Claire, Quebec | Dubuque (USHL) | FLA, 23rd overall 2012 |
| 6 | | Steven Santini | Sophomore | D | 6' 2" (1.88 m) | 201 lb (91 kg) | 1995-03-07 | Mahopac, New York | US NTDP (USHL) | NJD, 42nd overall 2013 |
| 7 | | Noah Hanifin | Freshman | D | 6' 2" (1.88 m) | 201 lb (91 kg) | 1997-01-25 | Norwood, Massachusetts | US NTDP (USHL) | — |
| 8 | | Travis Jeke | Junior | D | 6' 2" (1.88 m) | 192 lb (87 kg) | 1993-06-11 | Pittsburgh, Pennsylvania | Northwood (USHS–NY) | — |
| 9 | | Brendan Silk | Junior | F | 6' 3" (1.91 m) | 190 lb (86 kg) | 1994-01-13 | Wakefield, Massachusetts | US NTDP (USHL) | — |
| 10 | | Danny Linell | Senior | F | 5' 7" (1.7 m) | 178 lb (81 kg) | 1992-09-04 | Great Neck, New York | Choate (USHS–CT) | — |
| 11 | | Chris Calnan | Sophomore | F | 6' 2" (1.88 m) | 200 lb (91 kg) | 1994-05-05 | Norwell, Massachusetts | South Shore (EJHL) | CHI, 79th overall 2012 |
| 12 | | Alex Tuch | Freshman | F | 6' 3" (1.91 m) | 218 lb (99 kg) | 1996-05-10 | Baldwinsville, New York | US NTDP (USHL) | MIN, 18th overall 2014 |
| 14 | | Adam Gilmour | Sophomore | F | 6' 3" (1.91 m) | 193 lb (88 kg) | 1994-01-29 | Hanover, Massachusetts | Muskegon (USHL) | MIN, 98th overall 2012 |
| 15 | | Cam Spiro | Senior | F | 5' 10" (1.78 m) | 204 lb (93 kg) | 1991-12-30 | Hingham, Massachusetts | Tabor (USHS–MA) | — |
| 17 | | Destry Straight | Senior | F | 6' 1" (1.85 m) | 190 lb (86 kg) | 1993-03-22 | West Vancouver, British Columbia | Coquitlam (BCHL) | — |
| 18 | | Michael Sit (A) | Senior | F | 5' 10" (1.78 m) | 171 lb (78 kg) | 1993-02-04 | Edina, Minnesota | Edina (USHS–MN) | — |
| 19 | | Ryan Fitzgerald | Sophomore | F | 5' 9" (1.75 m) | 166 lb (75 kg) | 1994-10-19 | North Reading, Massachusetts | Valley Jr. Warriors (EJHL) | BOS, 120th overall 2013 |
| 20 | | Peter McMullen | Junior | F | 6' 1" (1.85 m) | 209 lb (95 kg) | 1993-02-19 | Essex Fells, New Jersey | Delbarton (USHS-NJ) | — |
| 21 | | Mathew Gaudreau | Sophomore | F | 5' 9" (1.75 m) | 135 lb (61 kg) | 1994-12-05 | Carneys Point, New Jersey | Omaha (USHL) | — |
| 24 | | Zachary Sanford | Freshman | F | 6' 3" (1.91 m) | 190 lb (86 kg) | 1994-11-09 | Auburn, New Hampshire | Middlesex Islanders (EJHL) | WSH, 61st overall 2013 |
| 26 | | Austin Cangelosi | Sophomore | F | 5' 6" (1.68 m) | 171 lb (78 kg) | 1994-08-27 | Estero, Florida | Youngstown (USHL) | — |
| 27 | | Quinn Smith (A) | Senior | F | 5' 8" (1.73 m) | 173 lb (78 kg) | 1992-01-11 | Fairfield, Connecticut | Avon Old Farms (USHS–CT) | — |
| 29 | | Brad Barone | Senior | G | 5' 10" (1.78 m) | 179 lb (81 kg) | 1990-12-02 | Medfield, Massachusetts | South Shore (EJHL) | — |
| 30 | | Thatcher Demko | Sophomore | G | 6' 3" (1.91 m) | 192 lb (87 kg) | 1995-12-08 | San Diego, California | US NTDP (USHL) | VAN, 36th overall 2014 |
| 35 | | Alex Joyce | Sophomore | G | 5' 10" (1.78 m) | 165 lb (75 kg) | 1995-01-01 | Darien, Connecticut | Pomfret School (USHS-CT) | — |

=== Coaching staff ===
| Name | Position | Seasons at Boston College | Alma mater |
|---|---|---|---|
| Jerry York | Head Coach | 21 | Boston College (1967) |
| Greg Brown | Associate head coach | 11 | Boston College (1990) |
| Mike Ayers | Assistant coach | 2 | University of New Hampshire (2004) |
| Marty McInnis | Assistant coach | 2 | Boston College (1992) |

== Standings ==
2014–15 Hockey East men's standings
| | Conference record | | | | | | | Overall record | | | | | |
| | GP | W | L | T | PTS | GF | GA | GP | W | L | T | GF | GA |
|---|---|---|---|---|---|---|---|---|---|---|---|---|---|
| #2 Boston University †* | 22 | 14 | 5 | 3 | 31 | 88 | 55 | 41 | 28 | 8 | 5 | 158 | 95 |
| #1 Providence | 22 | 13 | 8 | 1 | 27 | 61 | 37 | 41 | 26 | 13 | 2 | 123 | 84 |
| #13 Boston College | 22 | 12 | 7 | 3 | 27 | 60 | 50 | 38 | 21 | 14 | 3 | 107 | 91 |
| #17 Massachusetts–Lowell | 22 | 11 | 7 | 4 | 26 | 70 | 52 | 39 | 21 | 12 | 6 | 134 | 101 |
| Notre Dame | 22 | 10 | 7 | 5 | 25 | 64 | 54 | 42 | 18 | 19 | 5 | 126 | 116 |
| Northeastern | 22 | 11 | 9 | 2 | 24 | 70 | 69 | 36 | 16 | 16 | 4 | 107 | 107 |
| Vermont | 22 | 10 | 9 | 3 | 23 | 62 | 53 | 41 | 22 | 15 | 4 | 110 | 91 |
| New Hampshire | 22 | 10 | 11 | 1 | 21 | 66 | 68 | 40 | 19 | 19 | 2 | 119 | 109 |
| Connecticut | 22 | 7 | 11 | 4 | 18 | 42 | 74 | 36 | 10 | 19 | 7 | 66 | 111 |
| Maine | 22 | 8 | 12 | 2 | 18 | 64 | 74 | 39 | 14 | 22 | 3 | 108 | 127 |
| Merrimack | 22 | 5 | 14 | 3 | 13 | 38 | 56 | 38 | 16 | 18 | 4 | 81 | 93 |
| Massachusetts | 22 | 5 | 16 | 1 | 11 | 59 | 102 | 36 | 11 | 23 | 2 | 99 | 152 |
Championship: March 21, 2015 † indicates conference regular season champion; * indicates conference tournament champion Rankings: USCHO.com Top 20 Poll; updated March 9, 2015

== Schedule ==
=== Regular season ===
| Date | Time | Opponent^{#} | Rank^{#} | Site | TV | Result | Attendance | Record |
Exhibition
| October 4 | 7:00 pm | New Brunswick* | #4 | Kelley Rink • Chestnut Hill, Massachusetts | | W 6–4 | 539 | 0–0–0 |
Regular season
| October 10 | 7:00 pm | at #17 UMass Lowell | #4 | Tsongas Center • Lowell, Massachusetts | NESN | L 2–5 | 7,326 | 0–1–0 (0–1–0) |
| October 18 | 7:00 pm | vs. RIT* | #7 | Blue Cross Arena • Rochester, New York | | W 6–2 | 10,556 | 1–1–0 |
| October 24 | 7:30 pm | Colorado College* | #6 | Kelley Rink • Chestnut Hill, Massachusetts | | W 6–2 | 5,833 | 2–1–0 |
| October 25 | 7:00 pm | Massachusetts | #6 | Kelley Rink • Chestnut Hill, Massachusetts | | W 4–1 | 4,908 | 3–1–0 (1–1–0) |
| October 31 | 5:30 pm | at #11 Denver* | #5 | Magness Arena • Denver, Colorado | ROOT | W 2–1 | 4,559 | 4–1–1 |
| November 1 | 5:00 pm | at #11 Denver* | #5 | Magness Arena • Denver, Colorado | | L 1–2 ^{OT} | 6,032 | 4–2–0 |
| November 5 | 7:00 pm | at Connecticut | #3 | XL Center • Hartford, Connecticut | | L 0–1 | 8,089 | 4–3–0 (1–2–0) |
| November 7 | 7:00 pm | #5 Boston University | #3 | Kelley Rink • Chestnut Hill, Massachusetts (Green Line Rivalry) | NBCSN | L 3–5 | 7,884 | 4–4–0 (1–3–0) |
| November 11 | 7:00 pm | Harvard* | #8 | Kelley Rink • Chestnut Hill, Massachusetts | | L 3–6 | 4,706 | 4–5–0 |
| November 14 | 7:00 pm | at Michigan State* | #8 | Munn Ice Arena • East Lansing, Michigan | | W 3–2 | 5,595 | 5–5–0 |
| November 21 | 7:00 pm | at Massachusetts | #12 | Mullins Center • Amherst, Massachusetts | | W 5–3 | 5,939 | 6–5–0 (2–3–0) |
| November 22 | 7:00 pm | Maine | #12 | Kelley Rink • Chestnut Hill, Massachusetts | | W 4–1 | 6,773 | 7–5–0 (3–3–0) |
| November 28 | 7:07 pm | #3 Minnesota* | #12 | Kelley Rink • Chestnut Hill, Massachusetts | | L 2–6 | 6,748 | 7–6–0 |
| November 29 | 7:00 pm | at #20 Providence | #12 | Schneider Arena • Providence, Rhode Island | | L 0–1 | 2,978 | 7–7–0 (3–4–0) |
| December 5 | 7:00 pm | at New Hampshire | #17 | Whittemore Center • Durham, New Hampshire | NBCSN | T 2–2 ^{OT} | 6,263 | 7–7–1 (3–4–1) |
| December 6 | 7:00 pm | New Hampshire | #17 | Kelley Rink • Chestnut Hill, Massachusetts | | W 4–2 | 4,589 | 8–7–1 (4–4–1) |
| December 13 | 7:00 pm | Michigan* | #16 | Kelley Rink • Chestnut Hill, Massachusetts | | W 5–1 | 6,202 | 9–7–1 |
| January 2 | 4:00 pm | vs. Brown* | #15 | Thompson Arena • Hanover, New Hampshire (Ledyard Bank Classic) | | W 4–1 | 1,837 | 10–7–1 |
| January 3 | 7:00 pm | vs. Dartmouth* | #15 | Thompson Arena • Hanover, New Hampshire (Ledyard Bank Classic) | | W 3–2 | 3,651 | 11–7–1 |
| January 9 | 7:00 pm | at Northeastern | #16 | Matthews Arena • Boston, Massachusetts | | T 1–1 ^{OT} | 3,998 | 11–7–2 (4–4–2) |
| January 10 | 7:00 pm | Northeastern | #16 | Kelley Rink • Chestnut Hill, Massachusetts | NESN | W 4–2 | 4,615 | 12–7–2 (5–4–2) |
| January 16 | 7:00 pm | at #2 Boston University | #17 | Agganis Arena • Boston, Massachusetts (Green Line Rivalry) | NESN | W 4–2 | 6,150 | 13–7–2 (6–4–2) |
| January 18 | 3:00 pm | at Maine | #17 | Harold Alfond Arena • Orono, Maine | FCS | L 4–2 | 4,215 | 13–8–2 (6–5–2) |
| January 21 | 7:00 pm | #14 Merrimack | #19 | Kelley Rink • Chestnut Hill, Massachusetts | NESN | W 2–1 | 4,188 | 14–8–2 (7–5–2) |
| January 24 | 7:00 pm | Connecticut | #19 | Kelley Rink • Chestnut Hill, Massachusetts | | W 3–2 | 6,815 | 15–8–2 (8–5–2) |
| January 30 | 7:00 pm | #12 Providence | #14 | Kelley Rink • Chestnut Hill, Massachusetts | | W 3–2 | 7,389 | 16–8–2 (9–5–2) |
| February 3 (rescheduled from 2/2) | 8:00 pm | vs. Northeastern* | #11 | TD Garden • Boston, Massachusetts (Beanpot) | NESN | L 2–3 | 14,520 | 16–9–2 |
| February 6 | 7:00 pm | at #18 Merrimack | #11 | J. Thom Lawler Arena • North Andover, Massachusetts | | W 4–2 | 2,549 | 17–9–2 (10–5–2) |
| February 13 | 7:00 pm | #17 Vermont | #10 | Kelley Rink • Chestnut Hill, Massachusetts | | L 2–3 ^{OT} | 4,528 | 17–10–2 (10–6–2) |
| February 14 | 7:00 pm | #17 Vermont | #10 | Kelley Rink • Chestnut Hill, Massachusetts | | W 6–5 | 3,119 | 18–10–2 (11–6–2) |
| February 20 | 7:00 pm | #16 UMass Lowell | #10 | Kelley Rink • Chestnut Hill, Massachusetts | | T 2–2 ^{OT} | 6,615 | 18–10–3 (11–6–3) |
| February 23 (rescheduled from 2/9) | 4:30 pm | vs. #16 Harvard* | #9 | TD Garden • Boston, Massachusetts (Beanpot) | | W 3–2 ^{OT} | 14,253 | 19–10–3 |
| February 27 | 7:30 pm | at Notre Dame | #9 | Compton Family Center • Notre Dame, Indiana (Holy War on Ice) | NBCSN | W 2–0 | 5,092 | 20–10–3 (12–6–3) |
| February 28 | 6:00 pm | at Notre Dame | #9 | Compton Family Center • Notre Dame, Indiana (Holy War on Ice) | NBCSN | L 1–3 | 4,875 | 20–11–3 (12–7–3) |
Hockey East Tournament
| March 13 | 7:00 pm | #17 Vermont* | #9 | Kelley Rink • Chestnut Hill, Massachusetts (Quarterfinals) | | W 4–2 | 3,478 | 21–11–3 |
| March 14 | 7:00 pm | #17 Vermont* | #9 | Kelley Rink • Chestnut Hill, Massachusetts (Quarterfinals) | NESN | L 1–3 | 3,349 | 21–12–3 |
| March 15 | 6:00 pm | #17 Vermont* | #9 | Kelley Rink • Chestnut Hill, Massachusetts (Quarterfinals) | NESN | L 0–1 | 2,242 | 21–13–3 |
NCAA Tournament
| March 28 | 3:00 pm | vs. #6 Denver* | #12 | Dunkin' Donuts Center • Providence, Rhode Island (Regional semifinal) | ESPN2 | L 2–5 | 7,908 | 21–14–3 |
*Non-conference game. ^{#}Rankings from USCHO.com Poll. All times are in Eastern Time.

- On October 28, it was announced that Steven Santini needed to undergo wrist surgery and would miss the remainder of the first half of the season; he would return after the New Year's break.
- On October 31, Jerry York gained his 500th victory as head coach of the Eagles in a 2–1 victory over Denver.
- On November 11, it was announced that senior goaltender Brian Billet had taken a leave of absence from the program. Sophomore Alex Joyce was added to the roster to fill the third goaltender spot. Billett did return as an active player, but did not see any time on the ice during the season.
- On November 14, York earned his 501st victory as coach of the Eagles in a 3-2 match over Michigan State, tying legendary coach John "Snooks" Kelley for most wins at Boston College. He took sole possession of the record with his 502nd win on November 21, a 5–3 victory over UMass.
- On January 2, Eagles players Thatcher Demo, Ian McCoshen, Noah Hannifin, and Alex Tuch were away, representing the United States at the 2015 World Juniors in Montreal, Quebec and Toronto, Ontario, Canada. The US lost to Russia in the quarterfinal. Steven Santini and Scott Savage were also invited to try out for the national squad, but did not make the final cut.
- On January 3, the Eagles won the Ledyard Bank Classic Championship with a 3–2 win over host Dartmouth.
- On February 3, the Eagles lost to Northeastern 3–2 in the first round of the Beanpot tournament, ending their bid for 6 straight championships. It was their first loss in the tournament since 2008. They beat Harvard 3–2 in overtime of the consolation game on February 23.
- On February 27, the Eagles secured a 1st-round bye in the Hockey East playoffs, and will host a quarterfinals matchup at Conte Forum.
- On March 15, the Eagles were defeated by the Vermont Catamounts in the quarterfinals of the Hockey East tournament, losing the best of three series in three games. the Eagles took game 1 by a score of 4–2, but lost games 2 and 3 by scores of 3–1 and 1–0, respectively. This marks the second year in a row that the Eagles did not reach at least the Semi-finals of the Hockey East tournament.
- On March 19, Hockey East announced the season's Awards recipients and the All-Conference teams. Noah Hanifin was named to the All-second team, with Thatcher Demko, Ian McCoshen, and Alex Tuch making honorable mentions. Hanifin and Tuch were also All-Rookie recipients. Additionally, Michael Sit was awarded the Len Ceglarski Award for sportsmanship.
- On March 22, the NCAA tournament Selection Committee placed BC as the 3-seed in the east regional at Providence, losing to 2-seed Denver by a score of 5–2 in the first round.
- On March 30, BC announced the captains for the following season: Rising-senior Teddy Doherty was named captain, with rising-juniors Ian McCoshen, Steven Santini, and Chris Calnan named assistant captains. It is the first time since the 04–05 season in where there were three assistant captains.
- On April 2, the Florida Panthers announced they had signed Mike Matheson to an entry-level contract, who chose to forgo his senior season at Boston College. Matheson joined the San Antonio Rampage, Florida's AHL affiliate.
- On June 26, Noah Hanifin was drafted 5th overall by the Carolina Hurricanes in the 2015 NHL entry draft.
- On July 11, Hanifin signed an entry-level contract with the Hurricanes, forgoing the rest of his NCAA eligibility.

== Rankings ==
| Poll | Week | | | | | | | | | | | | | | | | | | | | | | | |
| Poll | Pre | 1 | 2 | 3 | 4 | 5 | 6 | 7 | 8 | 9 | 10 | 11 | 12 | 13 | 14 | 15 | 16 | 17 | 18 | 19 | 20 | 21 | 22 | Final |
|---|---|---|---|---|---|---|---|---|---|---|---|---|---|---|---|---|---|---|---|---|---|---|---|---|
| USCHO.com | 4 | 7 | 6 | 5 | 3 | 8 | 12 | 12 | 17 | 16 | 15 | 16 | 17 | 19 | 14 | 11 | 10 | 10 | 9 | 9 | 9 | 11 | 12 | 13 |
| USA Today | 4 | 8 | 6 | 5 | 3 | 8 | 12 | 12 | RV | RV | RV | RV | RV | RV | 15 | 12 | 11 | 11 | 10 | 9 | 9 | 11 | 12 | 14 |

== Statistics ==
=== Skaters ===
| No. | Player | POS | YR | GP | G | A | Pts | PIM | PP | SHG | GWG | +/- | SOG |
|---|---|---|---|---|---|---|---|---|---|---|---|---|---|
| 1 | Brian Billett | G | SR | 0 | 0 | 0 | 0 | 0 | 0 | 0 | 0 | E | 0 |
| 2 | Scott Savage | D | SO | 38 | 0 | 6 | 6 | 8 | 0 | 0 | 0 | -7 | 64 |
| 3 | Ian McCoshen | D | SO | 35 | 6 | 10 | 16 | 63 | 3 | 0 | 2 | +14 | 69 |
| 4 | Teddy Doherty | D | JR | 38 | 6 | 17 | 23 | 24 | 0 | 0 | 2 | +15 | 65 |
| 5 | Mike Matheson | D | JR | 38 | 3 | 22 | 25 | 26 | 0 | 0 | 0 | -4 | 107 |
| 6 | Steven Santini | D | SO | 22 | 1 | 4 | 5 | 20 | 0 | 0 | 0 | -2 | 39 |
| 7 | Noah Hanifin | D | FR | 37 | 5 | 18 | 23 | 16 | 1 | 0 | 0 | +12 | 82 |
| 8 | Travis Jeke | D | JR | 8 | 0 | 1 | 1 | 4 | 0 | 0 | 0 | E | 3 |
| 9 | Brendan Silk | F | JR | 22 | 0 | 3 | 3 | 10 | 0 | 0 | 0 | +1 | 17 |
| 10 | Danny Linell | F | SR | 26 | 0 | 1 | 1 | 4 | 0 | 0 | 0 | -1 | 10 |
| 11 | Chris Calnan | F | SO | 37 | 11 | 5 | 16 | 8 | 1 | 1 | 4 | +1 | 73 |
| 12 | Alex Tuch | F | FR | 37 | 14 | 14 | 28 | 28 | 3 | 0 | 2 | +13 | 119 |
| 14 | Adam Gilmour | F | SO | 38 | 9 | 18 | 27 | 22 | 5 | 0 | 1 | +14 | 70 |
| 15 | Cam Spiro | F | SR | 38 | 4 | 5 | 9 | 0 | 0 | 0 | 0 | +7 | 31 |
| 17 | Destry Straight | F | SR | 38 | 7 | 7 | 14 | 46 | 0 | 0 | 1 | -4 | 55 |
| 18 | Michael Sit | F | SR | 38 | 1 | 5 | 6 | 16 | 0 | 0 | 0 | E | 33 |
| 19 | Ryan Fitzgerald | F | SO | 38 | 17 | 8 | 25 | 54 | 7 | 2 | 5 | -4 | 125 |
| 20 | Peter McMullen | F | JR | 10 | 0 | 0 | 0 | 0 | 0 | 0 | 0 | E | 1 |
| 21 | Matt Gaudreau | F | SO | 32 | 3 | 3 | 6 | 8 | 0 | 0 | 0 | +4 | 41 |
| 24 | Zachary Sanford | F | FR | 38 | 7 | 17 | 24 | 30 | 0 | 0 | 2 | +10 | 88 |
| 26 | Austin Cangelosi | F | SO | 37 | 6 | 14 | 20 | 8 | 3 | 0 | 1 | +2 | 53 |
| 27 | Quinn Smith | F | SR | 38 | 7 | 7 | 14 | 26 | 0 | 0 | 1 | -10 | 45 |
| 29 | Brad Barone | G | SR | 3 | 0 | 0 | 0 | 0 | 0 | 0 | 0 | +1 | 0 |
| 30 | Thatcher Demko | G | SO | 35 | 0 | 2 | 2 | 2 | 0 | 0 | 0 | +19 | 0 |
| 35 | Alex Joyce | G | SO | 0 | 0 | 0 | 0 | 0 | 0 | 0 | 0 | E | 0 |
| | Bench | | | | | | | 10 | | | | | |
| | Team | | | 38 | 107 | 187 | 294 | 431 | 23 | 3 | 21 | +15 | 1190 |

=== Goaltenders ===
| No. | Player | YR | GS | GP | MIN | W | L | T | GA | GAA | SA | SV | SV% | SO |
|---|---|---|---|---|---|---|---|---|---|---|---|---|---|---|
| 1 | Brian Billett | SR | 0 | 0 | 0 | 0 | 0 | 0 | 0 | 0.00 | 0 | 0 | 1.00 | 0 |
| 29 | Brad Barone | SR | 3 | 3 | 178:43 | 2 | 1 | 0 | 8 | 2.69 | 75 | 67 | 0.893 | 0 |
| 30 | Thatcher Demko | SO | 35 | 35 | 2107:06 | 19 | 13 | 3 | 77 | 2.19 | 1027 | 950 | 0.925 | 1 |
| 35 | Alex Joyce | SO | 0 | 0 | 0 | 0 | 0 | 0 | 0 | 0.00 | 0 | 0 | 1.00 | 0 |
| | Empty Net | | | | 16:17 | | | | 6 | | 6 | | | |
| | Team | | 38 | 38 | 2302:06 | 21 | 14 | 3 | 91 | 2.37 | 1108 | 1017 | 0.918 | 1 |

== Awards and honors ==
Hockey East All-Stars

- Noah Hanifin, D – All-Second Team Archived 2015-03-22 at the Wayback Machine, All-Rookie Team Archived 2018-11-13 at the Wayback Machine
- Alex Tuch, F – Honorable Mention Archived 2015-03-22 at the Wayback Machine, All-Rookie Team Archived 2018-11-13 at the Wayback Machine
- Ian McCoshen, D – Honorable Mention Archived 2015-03-22 at the Wayback Machine
- Thatcher Demko, G – Honorable Mention Archived 2015-03-22 at the Wayback Machine

Hockey East Awards

- Michael Sit, F – Len Ceglarski Sportsmanship Award Archived 2018-11-13 at the Wayback Machine

Hockey East Player of the Week

- Adam Gilmour, F – Week of October 27, 2014

Hockey East Rookie of the Week

- Alex Tuch, F – Week of February 16, 2015

Hockey East Defensive Player of the Week

- Teddy Doherty, D – Week of October 20, 2014
