= Cal Petersen =

American ice hockey player (born 1994)

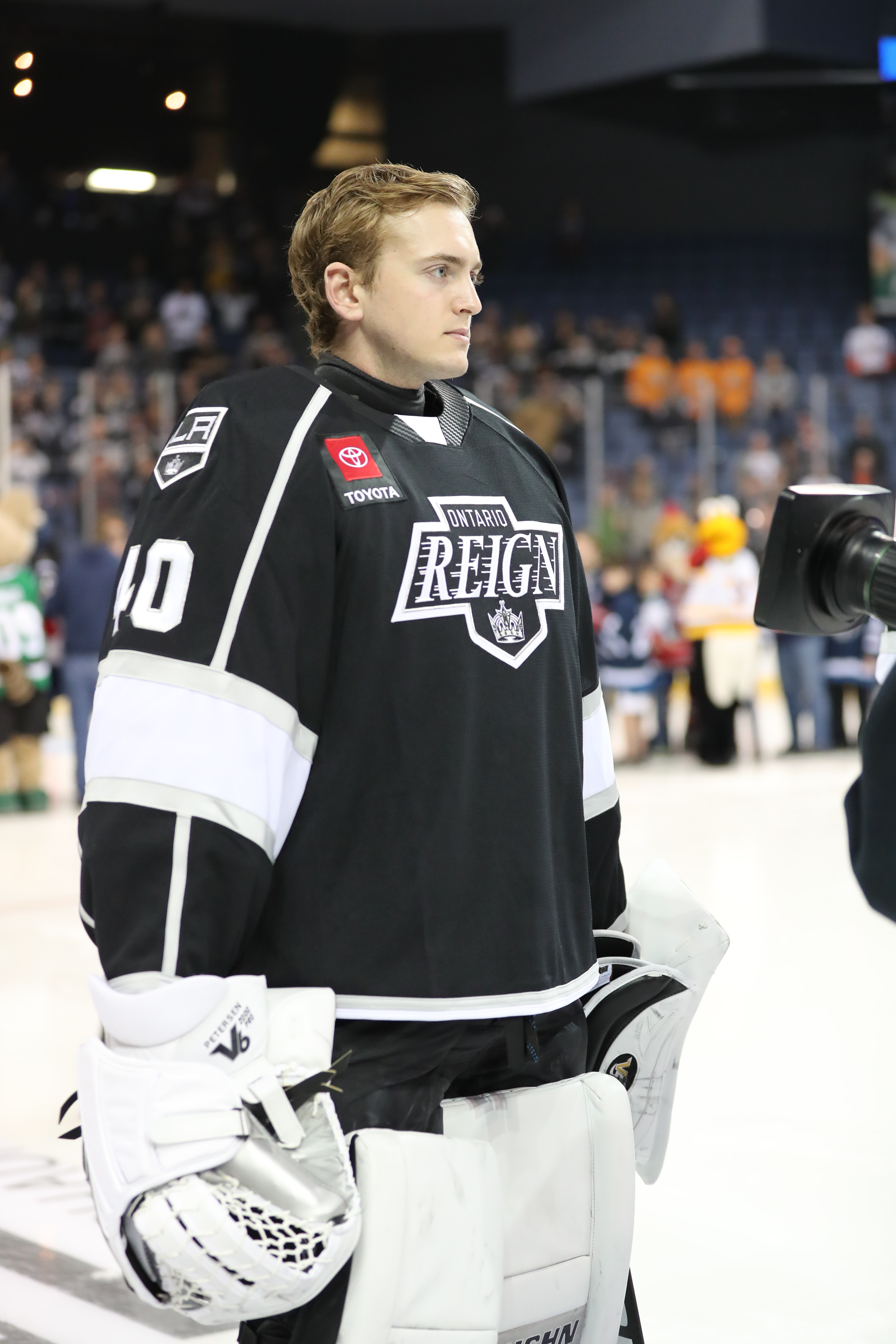
- Petersen with the Ontario Reign in 2020
- Born: October 19, 1994 (age 32) Waterloo, Iowa, U.S.
- Height: 6 ft 1 in (185 cm)
- Weight: 182 lb (83 kg; 13 st 0 lb)
- Position: Goaltender
- Catches: Right
- AHL team Former teams: Hershey Bears; Los Angeles Kings; Philadelphia Flyers
- National team: United States
- NHL draft: 129th overall, 2013; Buffalo Sabres
- Playing career: 2017–present

Calvin Louis Petersen (born October 19, 1994) is an American professional hockey player who is a goaltender for the Hershey Bears of the American Hockey League (AHL). He was selected in the fifth round, 129th overall by the Buffalo Sabres in the 2013 NHL entry draft. On July 1, 2017, he signed a two-year entry-level contract with the Los Angeles Kings as an unrestricted free agent.

Prior to turning professional, Petersen played college ice hockey for the University of Notre Dame. He set an NCAA Division I record of 87 saves during the longest collegiate ice hockey game ever. Petersen was named to the All-Rookie Team and First All-Star Team while at Notre Dame.

== Playing career ==
Petersen attended Waterloo West High School in Waterloo, Iowa. While in high school, he played junior ice hockey with the Topeka RoadRunners of the North American Hockey League (NAHL) and the Waterloo Black Hawks of the United States Hockey League (USHL). After the 2012–13 season, he was drafted in the 2013 NHL entry draft by the Buffalo Sabres. Petersen decided to attend university instead of turning professional immediately and played three seasons at the University of Notre Dame.

In his freshman season with Notre Dame, Petersen played in 33 games and posted a 13–16–3 record. He helped lead Notre Dame to the Hockey East playoffs, playing in all six games. On March 6, 2015, during first game of the Hockey East playoffs, Petersen set a Division 1 record 87 saves while playing in the longest collegiate hockey game against the UMass Minutemen. The game lasted five overtimes and ended in a 4–3 overtime loss. Notre Dame later lost in the quarterfinals to UMass Lowell. At the conclusion of the season, Petersen was named to the Hockey East All-Rookie Team and to the 2015 Hockey East All-Academic Team.

In his sophomore season, Petersen started in all 37 games of the season, posting a 19–11–7 record. As a result, Petersen was named an Honorable Mention Hockey East All-Star. He was also named a finalist for the 2016 Mike Richter Award as the most outstanding goaltender in NCAA men's ice hockey and named team's most valuable player.

In his junior year, Petersen was named team captain and led his team to the 2017 Frozen Four where they lost 6–1 to the Denver Pioneers. At the conclusion of the season, Petersen was named to the Hockey East First-Team All-Stars and again named one of the finalists for the 2017 Mike Richter Award.

On May 31, 2017, Petersen announced he was forgoing his final year of college eligibility, giving the Sabres 30 days to sign him before he became a free agent. Negotiations failed with the Sabres and he became a free agent. On July 1, 2017, he signed a two-year, entry-level contract with the Los Angeles Kings as an unrestricted free agent.

=== Professional ===
Petersen began the 2018–19 season with the Ontario Reign after being cut from the Kings training camp. On November 12, 2018, he was recalled from the Reign after Jack Campbell suffered a torn meniscus. Petersen made his NHL debut the following night against the Toronto Maple Leafs, coming in to relieve starter Peter Budaj in the second period. The Kings lost 5–1 to the Maple Leafs with Petersen saving 15 shots and allowing one goal. The following game, on November 16, Petersen earned his first NHL start in the United Center against the Chicago Blackhawks, and recorded his first NHL win that night in a 2–1 shootout, making 34 saves in total. Two games later, on November 19, Petersen recorded his first career NHL shutout by making 29 saves in a 2–0 win over the St. Louis Blues.

On July 16, 2019, Petersen signed a three-year contract extension with the Kings. He then began the 2019–20 season with the Reign. On January 3, 2020, Petersen was named to the AHL 2020 All-Star Game.

On September 22, 2021, Petersen signed a three-year, $15 million contract extension with the Kings.

On June 6, 2023, the Kings traded Petersen to the Philadelphia Flyers as part of a three-team trade, also involving the Columbus Blue Jackets.

On February 28, 2024, the Flyers placed Petersen on waivers.

On July 2, 2025, following two years within the Flyers organization, Petersen left as a free agent and was signed a one-year, two-way contract with the Minnesota Wild for the 2025–26 season. In the 2025–26 season, Petersen played exclusively with Minnesota's AHL affiliate, the Iowa Wild, posting 13 wins through 33 regular season appearances.

As a free agent at the conclusion of his contract with the Wild, Petersen went un-signed over the summer before attending the Washington Capitals training camp on a Professional Tryout Agreement to begin the 2026–27 season. On September 29, 2026, Petersen was signed to a one-year AHL contract with the Capitals affiliate, the Hershey Bears.

== International play ==
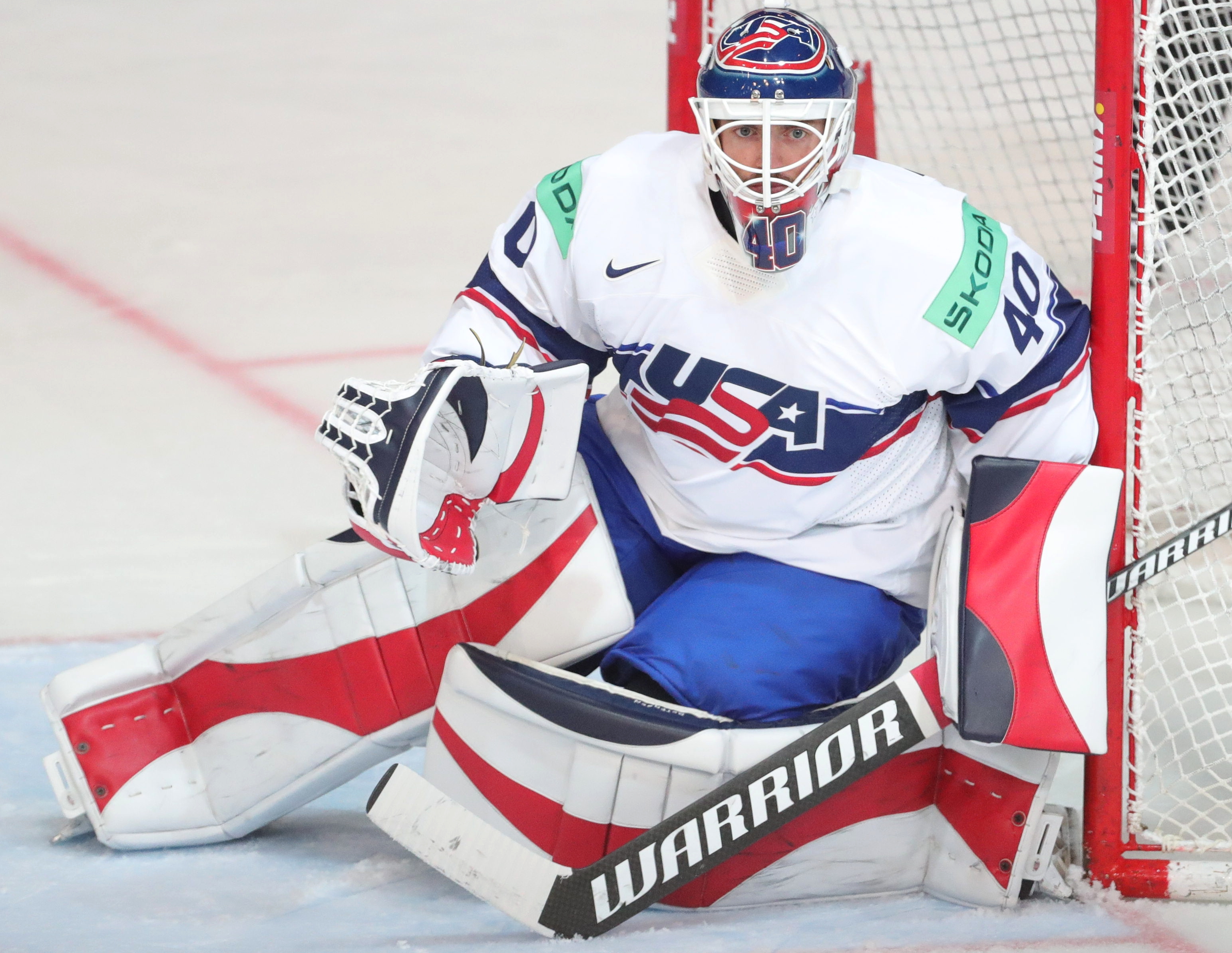
- Petersen with Team USA in 2023

Medal record

Representing United States

Ice hockey

World Championships
Bronze medal – third place	2021 Latvia	

On May 4, 2023, Petersen was named to the United States men's national ice hockey team to compete at the 2023 IIHF World Championship.

== Personal life ==
Petersen's father, Eric, was also a goaltender. He played Division III hockey at Bethel University in Minnesota.

== Career statistics ==
=== Regular season and playoffs ===
			Regular season									Playoffs
Season	Team	League	GP	W	L	T/OT	MIN	GA	SO	GAA	SV%	GP	W	L	MIN	GA	SO	GAA	SV%
2011–12	Topeka RoadRunners	NAHL	2	1	0	1	129	4	0	1.86	.925	—	—	—	—	—	—	—	—
2011–12	Waterloo Black Hawks	USHL	5	3	1	0	265	13	0	2.94	.902	—	—	—	—	—	—	—	—
2012–13	Waterloo Black Hawks	USHL	35	21	11	1	1937	96	3	2.97	.906	4	2	2	126	15	0	4.26	.881
2013–14	Waterloo Black Hawks	USHL	38	27	7	4	2229	93	2	2.50	.915	12	8	4	760	30	0	2.37	.928
2014–15	Notre Dame	HE	33	13	16	3	1892	79	4	2.51	.919	—	—	—	—	—	—	—	—
2015–16	Notre Dame	HE	37	19	11	7	2232	82	1	2.20	.927	—	—	—	—	—	—	—	—
2016–17	Notre Dame	HE	40	23	12	5	2375	88	6	2.22	.926	—	—	—	—	—	—	—	—
2017–18	Ontario Reign	AHL	41	23	14	2	2330	100	4	2.58	.910	4	1	3	277	11	0	2.38	.915
2018–19	Ontario Reign	AHL	38	13	19	3	2103	141	0	4.02	.896	—	—	—	—	—	—	—	—
2018–19	Los Angeles Kings	NHL	11	5	4	1	622	27	1	2.60	.924	—	—	—	—	—	—	—	—
2019–20	Ontario Reign	AHL	37	17	15	4	2079	119	3	3.43	.906	—	—	—	—	—	—	—	—
2019–20	Los Angeles Kings	NHL	8	5	3	0	478	21	0	2.64	.922	—	—	—	—	—	—	—	—
2020–21	Los Angeles Kings	NHL	35	9	18	5	2016	97	0	2.89	.911	—	—	—	—	—	—	—	—
2021–22	Los Angeles Kings	NHL	37	20	14	2	2177	105	3	2.89	.895	1	0	0	33	4	0	7.45	.800
2022–23	Los Angeles Kings	NHL	10	5	3	2	544	34	0	3.75	.868	—	—	—	—	—	—	—	—
2022–23	Ontario Reign	AHL	40	16	20	4	2396	115	2	2.88	.904	2	0	2	123	8	0	3.90	.826
2023–24	Lehigh Valley Phantoms	AHL	28	10	15	3	1680	76	2	2.71	.902	6	3	3	355	16	1	2.70	.887
2023–24	Philadelphia Flyers	NHL	5	2	2	0	277	18	0	3.90	.864	—	—	—	—	—	—	—	—
2024–25	Lehigh Valley Phantoms	AHL	31	13	15	3	1758	92	0	3.14	.885	3	1	2	144	9	0	3.76	.857
2025–26	Iowa Wild	AHL	33	13	16	2	1848	84	4	2.73	.896	—	—	—	—	—	—	—	—
NHL totals			106	46	44	10	6,112	302	4	2.96	.903	1	0	0	33	4	0	7.45	.800

=== International ===
Year	Team	Event	Result	GP	W	L	T	MIN	GA	SO	GAA	SV%
2011	United States	IH18	5th	1	0	0	0	20	3	0	9.00	.727
2021	United States	WC	3rd place, bronze medalist(s)	7	5	2	0	417	2	9	1.29	.953
2023	United States	WC	4th	3	3	0	0	167	2	0	0.72	.956
Junior totals				1	0	0	0	20	3	0	9.00	.727
Senior totals				10	8	2	0	584	9	2	1.29	.953

== Awards and honours ==
Award	Year
College
All-Rookie Team	2015
Hockey East All-Academic Team	2015
First All-Star Team	2017
AHL
All-Star Game	2018, 2020
International
Best Goaltender	2021
