= 2014–15 NCAA Division I men's ice hockey rankings =

- NCAA tournament: 2015
- NCAA champion: Providence
- Preseason No. 1 (USA Today): Minnesota
- Preseason No. 1 (USCHO): Minnesota
- NCAA Division I men's ice hockey rankings

Two human polls made up the 2014–15 NCAA Division I men's ice hockey rankings, the USCHO.com/CBS College Sports poll and the USA Today/USA Hockey Magazine poll. As the 2014–15 season progressed, rankings were updated weekly.

== Legend ==
	Increase in ranking
	Decrease in ranking
	Not ranked previous week
Italics	Number of first place votes
(#-#)	Win–loss–tie record
т	Tied with team above or below also with this symbol

== USCHO ==
	Preseason Sep 29	Week 1 Oct 13	Week 2 Oct 20	Week 3 Oct 27	Week 4 Nov 3	Week 5 Nov 10	Week 6 Nov 17	Week 7 Nov 24	Week 8 Dec 1	Week 9 Dec 9	Week 10 Dec 15	Week 11 Jan 5	Week 12 Jan 12	Week 13 Jan 19	Week 14 Jan 26	Week 15 Feb 2	Week 16 Feb 9	Week 17 Feb 16	Week 18 Feb 23	Week 19 Mar 2	Week 20 Mar 9	Week 21 Mar 16	Week 22 Mar 23	Final Apr 13	
1.	Minnesota (36)	Minnesota (2–0–0) (47)	Minnesota (2–0–0) (39)	Minnesota (4–0–0) (50)	Minnesota (5–1–0) (37)	Minnesota (7–1–0) (45)	Michigan Tech (10–0–0) (24)	Boston University (8–1–1) (42)	North Dakota (10–3–2) (29)	North Dakota (12–3–2) (38)	Boston University (11–3–2) (18)	North Dakota (13–4–2) (13)	Minnesota State (16–4–1) (20)	Minnesota State (18–4–1) (42)	North Dakota (18–5–2) (34)	Minnesota State (21–5–1) (20)	Minnesota State (23–5–1) (33)	North Dakota (20–6–3) (35)	North Dakota (22–6–3) (45)	North Dakota (24–6–3) (49)	North Dakota (25–7–3) (43)	North Dakota (27–7–3) (44)	Minnesota State (29–7–3) (44)	Providence (26–13–2) (49)	1.
2.	North Dakota (2)	Union (2–0–0) (3)	Union (4–0–0) (11)	Union (5–1–0)	North Dakota (5–1–1) (11)	North Dakota (7–1–1) (3)	North Dakota (8–2–1) (12)	North Dakota (9–3–1) (3)	Minnesota State (11–3–0) (5)	Boston University (10–3–2) (1)	North Dakota (13–4–2) (12)	Boston University (11–3–3) (18)	Boston University (12–3–4) (12)	North Dakota (16–5–2) (7)	Boston University (15–4–4) (5)	North Dakota (19–6–2) (14)	North Dakota (19–6–2) (11)	Minnesota State (23–6–2) (10)	Minnesota State (23–6–2) (3)	Minnesota State (24–6–3) (1)	Minnesota State (25–7–3) (2)	Minnesota State (27–7–3) (3)	Boston University (25–7–5) (6)	Boston University (28–8–5) (1)	2.
3.	Providence (2)	North Dakota (1–1–0)	North Dakota (3–1–0)	North Dakota (4–1–1)	Boston College (4–2–0) (1)	Boston University (5–1–1)	Boston University (6–1–1) (14)	Minnesota (7–3–0) (1)	Boston University (9–3–1) (4)	Minnesota State (12–4–0) (1)	Minnesota State (13–4–0) (6)	Harvard (10–1–2) (15)	North Dakota (14–5–2) (9)	Boston University (13–4–4)	Minnesota State (19–5–1) (11)	Boston University (16–4–4) (16)	Boston University (18–4–4) (6)	Boston University (19–5–4)	Michigan Tech (24–7–1) (2)	Boston University (21–7–5)	Boston University (21–7–5) (4)	Boston University (23–7–5) (3)	North Dakota (27–9–3)	North Dakota (29–10–3)	3.
4.	Boston College	Ferris State (1–0–0)	Colgate (3–1–0)	Colgate (5–1–0)	Colgate (6–2–0)	UMass Lowell (6–1–2)	Minnesota (7–3–0)	UMass Lowell (8–2–3)	Miami (OH) (10–4–0)	Michigan Tech (12–2–0) (1)	Harvard (9–1–2) (11)	Minnesota State (14–4–1) (1)	Harvard (10–2–2) (5)	Harvard (11–3–2) (1)	Harvard (12–4–2)	Omaha (16–7–3)	Omaha (16–7–3)	Michigan Tech (24–7–1) (5)	Boston University (19–6–5)	Michigan Tech (24–8–2)	Michigan Tech (26–8–2) (1)	Michigan Tech (28–8–2)	Miami (OH) (25–13–1)	Omaha (20–13–6)	4.
5.	Union (9)	Providence (1–1–0)	Providence (1–1–0)	Boston College (3–1–0)	Boston University (4–1–0)	Michigan Tech (8–0–0) (2)	UMass Lowell (7–2–2)	Miami (OH) (10–4–0)	Michigan Tech (12–2–0)	Harvard (9–1–2) (6)	Michigan Tech (13–3–0)	Miami (OH) (14–6–0)	Minnesota–Duluth (13–7–0) (4)	UMass Lowell (15–5–3)	Omaha (15–6–3)	Michigan Tech (20–7–1)	Michigan Tech (22–7–1)	Omaha (17–8–3)	Miami (OH) (19–10–1)	Miami (OH) (20–11–1)	Miami (OH) (21–12–1)	Denver (22–12–2)	Michigan Tech (29–9–2)	Denver (24–14–2)	5.
6.	Colgate (1)	Colgate (1–1–0)	Boston College (1–1–0)	Boston University (3–0–0)	UMass Lowell (5–1–1)	Colgate (7–3–0)	Colgate (8–3–1)	Michigan Tech (10–2–0)	Minnesota (8–4–0) (2)	Miami (OH) (11–5–0)	Miami (OH) (11–5–0)	UMass Lowell (14–3–3)	UMass Lowell (14–4–3)	Bowling Green (14–4–4)	Bowling Green (15–5–4)	Harvard (12–5–2)	Minnesota–Duluth (17–10–1)	Miami (OH) (18–9–1)	Minnesota–Duluth (19–12–1)	Minnesota–Duluth (19–12–3)	Minnesota–Duluth (20–13–3)	Miami (OH) (23–13–1)	Denver (23–13–2)	Minnesota-Duluth (21–16–3)	6.
7.	St. Cloud State	Boston College (0–1–0)	UMass Lowell (2–0–1)	St. Cloud State (2–2–0)	St. Cloud State (3–3–0)	Miami (OH) (7–3–0)	Miami (OH) (8–4–0)	Minnesota State (9–3–0) (3)	UMass Lowell (8–3–3) (1)	Minnesota (9–4–1)	Minnesota–Duluth (12–6–0) (3)	Minnesota–Duluth (12–6–0) (3)	Bowling Green (13–3–4)	Minnesota–Duluth (13–8–1)	Minnesota–Duluth (14–9–1)	Minnesota–Duluth (15–10–1)	Miami (OH) (16–9–1)	Minnesota–Duluth (18–11–1)	Denver (18–10–2)	Denver (19–11–2)	Denver (20–12–2)	Quinnipiac (23–10–4)	Minnesota–Duluth (20–15–3)	Minnesota State (29–8–3)	7.
8.	Michigan	St. Cloud State (1–1–0)	Ferris State (2–1–0)	UMass Lowell (3–1–1)	Union (5–3–0)	Boston College (4–4–0)	Minnesota–Duluth (8–4–0)	Minnesota–Duluth (9–5–0) (1)	Minnesota–Duluth (9–5–0) (3)	UMass Lowell (10–3–3)	Minnesota (9–4–1)	Michigan Tech (15–5–0)	Omaha (14–5–3)	Omaha (15–6–3)	Michigan Tech (18–7–1)	Bowling Green (15–6–5) т	Bowling Green (17–6–5)	Bowling Green (18–7–5)	Omaha (17–10–3)	Omaha (17–10–5)	Omaha (18–10–6)	Minnesota–Duluth (20–15–3)	Minnesota (23–12–3)	Miami (OH) (25–13–1)	8.
9.	Ferris State	UMass Lowell (1–0–0)	St. Cloud State (1–1–0)	Providence (1–2–1)	Michigan Tech (6–0–0) (1)	Minnesota State (7–3–0)	Minnesota State (7–3–0)	Colgate (9–4–1)	Harvard (7–1–2) (6)	Minnesota–Duluth (11–5–0) (3)	UMass Lowell (10–3–3)	Minnesota (10–5–1)	Miami (OH) (14–8–0)	Miami (OH) (14–8–0)	Miami (OH) (15–9–0)	Miami (OH) (15–9–1) т	Denver (16–9–1)	Denver (16–10–2)	Boston College (18–10–3)	Boston College (20–11–3)	Boston College (20–11–3)	Bowling Green (23–10–5)	Omaha (18–12–6)	Michigan Tech (29–10–2)	9.
10.	Wisconsin	Michigan (0–1–0)	Miami (OH) (3–1–0)	Miami (OH) (4–2–0)	Denver (4–2–0)	Vermont (6–1–1)	Denver (6–3–0)	Denver (8–3–0)	Denver (8–3–0)	Vermont (11–3–1)	Vermont (13–3–1)	Denver (11–5–1)	Vermont (15–5–1)	Michigan Tech (16–7–1)	UMass Lowell (15–7–3)	Denver (15–9–1)	Boston College (17–9–2)	Boston College (18–10–2)	Quinnipiac (20–8–4)	Providence (21–11–2)	Providence (21–11–2)	Omaha (18–12–6)	Harvard (21–12–3)	St. Cloud State (20–19–1)	10.
11.	Miami (Ohio)	Miami (OH) (1–1–0)	Denver (2–0–0)	Denver (3–1–0)	Miami (OH) (5–3–0)	Denver (5–3–0)	Vermont (7–2–1)	Omaha (7–2–1)	Vermont (11–3–1)	Denver (9–4–0)	Denver (10–5–0)	Bowling Green (12–3–3)	Michigan Tech (15–6–1)	Denver (13–7–1)	Denver (14–8–1)	Boston College (16–8–2)	Providence (17–9–2)	Quinnipiac (20–8–2)	Bowling Green (18–9–5)	Quinnipiac (21–9–4)	Quinnipiac (21–9–4)	Boston College (21–13–3)	Quinnipiac (23–11–4)	Harvard (21–13–3)	11.
12.	Notre Dame	Minnesota State (1–1–0)	Boston University (1–0–0)	Minnesota State (4–2–0)	Providence (2–3–1)	Union (5–4–1)	Boston College (5–5–0)	Boston College (7–5–0)	Omaha (7–3–2)	Omaha (8–4–2)	Omaha (10–4–2)	Vermont (14–5–1)	Quinnipiac (15–6–1)	Vermont (15–6–2)	Providence (16–8–1)	UMass Lowell (16–8–3)	Michigan (16–8–0)	Providence (18–10–2)	Yale (16–7–4)	Yale (17–7–5)	Yale (17–7–5)	UMass Lowell (20–11–6)	Boston College (21–13–3)	Minnesota (23–13–3)	12.
13.	Minnesota State	Quinnipiac (1–0–0)	Minnesota State (2–2–0)	Vermont (4–0–0)	Minnesota State (5–3–0)	Minnesota–Duluth (6–4–0)	Omaha (6–1–1)	Vermont (8–3–1)	Colgate (9–5–1)	Bowling Green (11–3–2)	Bowling Green (11–3–2)	Omaha (12–5–3)	Denver (11–7–1)	Yale (11–4–2)	Michigan (15–7–0)	Providence (16–9–1)	Quinnipiac (18–8–2)	Yale (15–7–3)	Providence (19–11–2)	Bowling Green (19–10–5)	Bowling Green (21–10–5)	Minnesota (21–12–3)	St. Cloud State (19–18–1)	Boston College (21–14–3)	13.
14.	Cornell	Boston University (1–0–0)	Michigan (1–2–0)	Ferris State (2–3–0)	Vermont (4–1–1)	Omaha (6–1–1)	Quinnipiac (7–2–1)	Quinnipiac (8–3–1)	Bowling Green (10–3–1)	Colgate (9–5–1)	Quinnipiac (10–5–1)	Providence (13–6–1)	Providence (14–7–1)	Merrimack (13–6–2)	Boston College (15–8–2)	Michigan (15–8–0)	Harvard (12–8–2)	Harvard (13–8–3)	UMass Lowell (17–10–5)	UMass Lowell (18–10–6)	UMass Lowell (18–10–6)	Providence (22–13–2)	UMass Lowell (21–12–6)	Quinnipiac (23–12–4)	14.
15.	Quinnipiac	Cornell (0–0–0)	Quinnipiac (1–1–1)	Michigan (2–3–0)	Notre Dame (5–2–1)	St. Cloud State (3–5–0)	Union (6–5–1)	Bowling Green (10–3–1)	Quinnipiac (9–4–1)	Quinnipiac (10–5–1)	Boston College (9–7–1)	Quinnipiac (13–6–1)	Colgate (13–6–1)	Colgate (14–7–1)	Vermont (15–8–2)	Yale (12–6–3)	Yale (13–7–3)	Michigan (16–10–0)	Minnesota (17–10–3)	Minnesota (18–11–3)	Minnesota (19–12–3)	Colgate (21–11–4)	Providence (22–13–2)	Yale (18–10–5)	15.
16.	Northeastern	Denver (0–0–0)	Alaska (4–0–0)	Alaska (4–1–0)	Ferris State (3–4–0)	Providence (3–4–1)	St. Cloud State (4–5–1)	St. Cloud State (5–6–1)	Providence (7–5–1)	Boston College (8–7–1)	Providence (9–6–1)	Boston College (11–7–1)	Minnesota (10–7–1)	Michigan (13–7–0)	Yale (11–6–2)	Quinnipiac (16–8–2)	UMass Lowell (16–10–3)	UMass Lowell (17–10–4)	Harvard (14–9–3)	Michigan (19–11–0)	Colgate (19–11–4)	Vermont (22–14–4)	Bowling Green (23–11–5)	RIT (20–15–5)	16.
17.	UMass Lowell	Ohio State (1–1–0)	Vermont (3–0–0)	Michigan Tech (4–0–0)	Minnesota–Duluth (4–4–0)	Robert Morris (7–0–1)	Northern Michigan (6–1–1)	Union (6–5–1)	Boston College (7–7–0)	Robert Morris (10–3–1)	Colgate (9–6–1)	Colgate (11–6–1)	Boston College (12–7–2)	Minnesota (11–7–2)	Colgate (14–8–2)	Vermont (15–9–2)	Vermont (16–10–2)	Minnesota (16–9–3)	Michigan (17–11–0)	Vermont (18–12–4)	Vermont (20–13–4)	Harvard (19–12–3)	Yale (18–9–5)	UMass Lowell (21–12–6)	17.
18.	Denver	Wisconsin (0–2–0)	Cornell (0–0–0)	Cornell (0–0–0)	Robert Morris (7–0–1)	Northern Michigan (6–1–1)	Bowling Green (8–3–1)	Harvard (5–1–2)	Merrimack (10–4–1)	Providence (8–6–1)	Merrimack (10–5–2)	Merrimack (11–6–2)	Yale (9–4–2)	Providence (14–8–1)	Quinnipiac (15–8–1)	Merrimack (14–9–3)	Robert Morris (20–5–5)	Vermont (17–11–2)	Vermont (18–11–3)	Colgate (19–11–4)	Harvard (17–11–3)	St. Cloud State (18–17–1)	Colgate (22–12–4)	Bowling Green (23–11–5)	18.
19.	New Hampshire	Alaska (2–0–0)	Minnesota–Duluth (2–2–0)	Minnesota–Duluth (3–3–0)	Omaha (4–1–1)	Bowling Green (7–2–1)	Providence (4–5–1)	Northern Michigan (7–2–1)	Northern Michigan (8–3–1)	Merrimack (10–5–2)	Robert Morris (11–2–3)	Yale (8–3–2)	Michigan (12–7–0)	Boston College (13–8–2)	Merrimack (13–8–3)	Robert Morris (19–5–4)	Penn State (15–7–4)	Robert Morris (20–5–5)	St. Lawrence (18–11–3)	Harvard (15–11–3)	Michigan (19–13–0)	Yale (18–9–5)	Vermont (22–15–4)	Colgate (22–12–4)	19.
20.	Boston University	Minnesota–Duluth (1–1–0)	Alaska Anchorage (3–0–1)	Notre Dame (4–2–0)	Northern Michigan (5–0–1)	Quinnipiac (5–2–1)	Robert Morris (7–1–2)	Providence (5–5–1)	Robert Morris (8–1–3)	Union (9–6–1)	Penn State (9–4–2)	Robert Morris (12–4–4)	Merrimack (11–6–2)	Quinnipiac (15–8–1)	Robert Morris (17–5–4)	Colgate (14–9–3)	St. Lawrence (16–10–2)	St. Lawrence (16–11–3)	Robert Morris (21–6–5)	Robert Morris (22–7–5)	Robert Morris (22–7–5)	Robert Morris (24–7–5)	Michigan (22–15–0)	Michigan (22–15–0)	20.
	Preseason Sep 29	Week 1 Oct 13	Week 2 Oct 20	Week 3 Oct 27	Week 4 Nov 3	Week 5 Nov 10	Week 6 Nov 17	Week 7 Nov 24	Week 8 Dec 1	Week 9 Dec 9	Week 10 Dec 15	Week 11 Jan 5	Week 12 Jan 12	Week 13 Jan 19	Week 14 Jan 26	Week 15 Feb 2	Week 16 Feb 9	Week 17 Feb 16	Week 18 Feb 23	Week 19 Mar 2	Week 20 Mar 9	Week 21 Mar 16	Week 22 Mar 23	Final Apr 13	
		Dropped: Notre Dame; New Hampshire; Northeastern	Dropped: Wisconsin; Ohio State	Dropped: Alaska Anchorage; Quinnipiac	Dropped: Cornell; Alaska; Michigan	Dropped: Notre Dame; Ferris State	None	Dropped: Robert Morris	Dropped: St. Cloud State; Union	Dropped: Northern Michigan	Dropped: Union	Dropped: Penn State	Dropped: Robert Morris	None	Dropped: Minnesota	None	Dropped: Merrimack; Colgate	Dropped: Penn State	None	Dropped: St. Lawrence	None	Dropped: Michigan	Dropped: Robert Morris	Dropped: Vermont	

== USA Today ==
	Preseason Sep 29	Week 1 Oct 13	Week 2 Oct 20	Week 3 Oct 27	Week 4 Nov 3	Week 5 Nov 10	Week 6 Nov 17	Week 7 Nov 24	Week 8 Dec 1	Week 9 Dec 8	Week 10 Dec 15	Week 11 Jan 5	Week 12 Jan 12	Week 13 Jan 19	Week 14 Jan 26	Week 15 Feb 2	Week 16 Feb 9	Week 17 Feb 16	Week 18 Feb 23	Week 19 Mar 2	Week 20 Mar 9	Week 21 Mar 16	Week 22 Mar 23	Final Apr 13	
1.	Minnesota (32)	Minnesota (2–0–0) (34)	Minnesota (2–0–0) (23)	Minnesota (4–0–0) (33)	Minnesota (5–1–0) (24)	Minnesota (7–1–0) (30)	Michigan Tech (10–0–0) (17)	Boston University (8–1–1) (27)	North Dakota (10–3–2) (28)	North Dakota (12–3–2) (29)	Boston University (11–3–2) (19)	North Dakota (13–4–2) (9)	Minnesota State (16–4–1) (13)	Minnesota State (18–4–1) (32)	North Dakota (18–5–2) (21)	Minnesota State (21–5–1) (13)	Minnesota State (23–5–1) (17)	North Dakota (20–6–3) (25)	North Dakota (22–6–3) (33)	North Dakota (24–6–3) (33)	North Dakota (25–7–3) (30)	North Dakota (27–7–3) (33)	Minnesota State (29–7–3) (30)	Providence (26–13–2) (34)	1.
2.	North Dakota (1)	Union (2–0–0)	Union (4–0–0) (10)	North Dakota (4–1–1)	North Dakota (5–1–1) (9)	North Dakota (7–1–1) (3)	Boston University (6–1–1) (10)	North Dakota (9–3–1) (4)	Boston University (9–3–1) (2)	Boston University (10–3–1) (1)	North Dakota (13–4–2) (5)	Boston University (11–3–3) (12)	North Dakota (14–5–1) (8)	North Dakota (16–5–2) (1)	Boston University (15–4–4) (7)	Boston University (16–4–4) (15)	Boston University (18–4–4) (12)	Boston University (19–5–4) (1)	Minnesota State (23–6–2)	Minnesota State (24–6–3) (1)	Minnesota State (25–7–3)	Minnesota-State (27–7–3)	Boston University (25–7–5) (4)	Boston University (28–8–5)	2.
3.	Providence	North Dakota (1–1–0)	North Dakota (3–1–0) (1)	Union (5–1–0) (1)	Boston College (4–2–0) (1)	Boston University (5–1–1)	North Dakota (8–2–1) (7)	Minnesota (7–3–0)	Minnesota (8–4–0)	Minnesota State (12–4–0)	Minnesota State (13–4–0)	Harvard (10–1–2) (13)	Boston University (12–3–4) (7)	Boston University (13–4–4)	Minnesota State (19–5–1) (6)	North Dakota (19–6–2) (6)	North Dakota (19–6–2) (5)	Minnesota State (23–6–2) (3)	Michigan Tech (24–7–1) (1)	Boston University (21–7–5)	Boston University (21–7–5) (3)	Boston University (23–7–5) (1)	North Dakota (27–9–3)	North Dakota (29–10–3)	3.
4.	Boston College	Colgate (1–1–0)	Colgate (3–1–0)	Colgate (5–1–0)	Colgate (6–2–0)	UMass Lowell (6–1–2)	Minnesota (7–3–0)	UMass Lowell (8–2–3)	Minnesota State (11–3–0)	Michigan Tech (12–2–0)	Harvard (9–1–2) (9)	Minnesota State (14–4–1)	Harvard (10–2–2) (5)	Harvard (11–3–2) (1)	Harvard (12–4–2)	Omaha (16–7–3)	Omaha (16–7–3)	Michigan Tech (24–7–1) (5)	Boston University (19–6–5)	Michigan Tech (24–8–2)	Michigan Tech (26–8–2) (1)	Michigan Tech (28–8–2)	Miami (OH) (25–13–1)	Omaha (20–13–6)	4.
5.	Colgate	Providence (1–1–0)	Providence (1–1–0)	Boston College (3–1–0)	Boston University (4–1–0)	Michigan Tech (8–0–0) (1)	UMass Lowell (7–2–2)	Michigan Tech (10–2–0) (1)	Miami (OH) (10–4–0)	Harvard (9–1–2) (4)	Michigan Tech (13–3–0)	UMass Lowell (14–3–3)	Minnesota–Duluth (13–7–0)	UMass Lowell (15–5–3)	Omaha (15–6–3)	Michigan Tech (20–7–1)	Michigan Tech (22–7–1)	Omaha (17–8–3)	Miami (OH) (19–10–1)	Miami (OH) (20–11–1)	Miami (OH) (21–12–1)	Miami (OH) (23–13–1)	Michigan Tech (29–9–2)	Denver (24–14–2)	5.
6.	St. Cloud State	Ferris State (1–0–0)	Boston College (1–1–0)	Boston University (3–0–0)	St. Cloud State (3–3–0)	Colgate (7–3–0)	Colgate (8–3–1)	Miami (OH) (10–4–0)	Michigan Tech (12–2–0)	Minnesota (9–4–1)	Miami (OH) (11–5–0)	Miami (OH) (14–6–0)	UMass Lowell (14–4–3)	Bowling Green (14–4–4)	Bowling Green (15–5–4)	Harvard (12–5–2)	Minnesota–Duluth (17–10–1)	Miami (OH) (18–9–1)	Minnesota–Duluth (19–12–1)	Minnesota–Duluth (19–12–3)	Minnesota–Duluth (20–13–3)	Denver (22–12–2)	Denver (23–12–2)	Minnesota State (29–8–3)	6.
7.	Michigan	St. Cloud State (1–1–0)	Ferris State (2–1–0)	St. Cloud State (2–2–0)	UMass Lowell (5–1–1)	Miami (OH) (7–3–0)	Miami (OH) (8–4–0)	Minnesota State (9–3–0) (2)	UMass Lowell (8–3–3)	Miami (OH) (11–5–0)	UMass Lowell (10–3–3)	Minnesota–Duluth (12–6–0)	Omaha (13–3–4) (1)	Minnesota Duluth (13–8–1)	Minnesota–Duluth (14–9–1)	Minnesota–Duluth (15–10–1)	Miami (OH) (16–9–1)	Minnesota–Duluth (18–11–1)	Denver (18–10–2)	Omaha (17–10–5)	Omaha (18–10–6)	Quinnipiac (23–12–4)	Minnesota–Duluth (20–15–3)	Minnesota-Duluth (21–16–3)	7.
8.	Union (1)	Boston College (0–1–0)	UMass Lowell (2–0–1)	Providence (1–2–1)	Union (5–3–0)	Boston College (4–4–0)	Minnesota–Duluth (8–4–0)	Minnesota–Duluth (9–5–0)	Harvard (7–1–2) (4)	UMass Lowell (10–3–3)	Minnesota (9–4–1)	Michigan Tech (15–5–0)	Bowling Green (13–3–4)	Omaha (15–6–3)	Miami (OH) (15–9–0)	Miami (OH) (15–9–1)	Bowling Green (17–6–5)	Bowling Green (18–7–5)	Omaha (17–10–3)	Denver (19–11–2)	Denver (20–12–2)	Minnesota–Duluth (20–15–3)	Harvard (21–12–3)	Miami (OH) (25–14–1)	8.
9.	Miami (OH)	UMass Lowell (1–0–0)	St. Cloud State (1–1–0)	UMass Lowell (3–1–1)	Michigan Tech (6–0–0)	Minnesota State (7–3–0)	Minnesota State (7–3–0)	Colgate (9–4–1)	Minnesota–Duluth (9–5–0)	Minnesota–Duluth (11–5–0)	Vermont (13–3–1)	Minnesota (10–5–1)	Vermont (15–5–1)	Miami (OH) (14–8–0)	Michigan Tech (18–7–1)	Bowling Green (15–6–5)	Denver (16–9–1)	Denver (16–10–2)	Quinnipiac (20–8–4)	Boston College (20–11–3)	Boston College (20–11–3)	Bowling Green (23–10–5)	Omaha (18–12–6)	Michigan Tech (29–10–2)	9.
10.	Ferris State	Michigan (0–1–0)	Miami (OH) (3–1–0)	Miami (OH) (4–2–0)	Providence (2–3–1)	Vermont (6–1–1)	Vermont (7–2–1)	Denver (8–3–0)	Vermont (11–3–1)	Vermont (11–3–1)	Minnesota–Duluth (12–6–0)	Denver (11–5–1)	Miami (OH) (14–8–0)	Michigan Tech (16–7–1)	UMass Lowell (15–7–3)	Denver (15–9–1)	Providence (17–9–2)	Quinnipiac (20–8–2)	Boston College (18–10–3)	Quinnipiac (21–9–4)	Providence (21–11–2)	Omaha (18–12–6)	Minnesota (23–12–3)	Minnesota (23–13–3)	10.
11.	Notre Dame	Miami (OH) (1–1–0)	Boston University (1–0–0)	Denver (3–1–0)	Miami (OH) (5–3–0)	Denver (5–3–0)	Denver (6–3–0)	Boston College (7–5–0)	Denver (8–3–0)	Denver (9–4–0)	Denver (10–5–0)	Vermont (14–5–1)	Michigan Tech (15–6–1)	Denver (13–7–1)	Providence (16–8–1)	UMass Lowell (16–8–3)	Boston College (17–9–2)	Boston College (18–10–2)	Bowling Green (18–9–5)	Providence (21–11–2)	Quinnipiac (21–9–4)	Boston College (21–13–3)	Quinnipiac (23–11–4)	Harvard (21–13–3)	11.
12.	Wisconsin	Minnesota State (1–1–0)	Minnesota State (2–2–0)	Minnesota State (4–2–0)	Denver (4–2–0)	Union (5–4–1)	Boston College (5–5–0)	Vermont (8–3–1)	Colgate (9–5–1)	Omaha (8–4–2)	Omaha (10–4–2) (1)	Omaha (12–5–3)	Quinnipiac (15–6–1)	Vermont (15–6–2)	Denver (14–8–1)	Boston College (16–8–2)	Michigan (16–8–0)	Providence (18–10–2)	Yale (16–7–4)	Yale (17–7–5)	Yale (17–7–5)	UMass Lowell (20–11–6)	Boston College (21–13–3)	St. Cloud State (20–19–1)	12.
13.	Minnesota State	Boston University (1–0–0)	Denver (2–0–0)	Michigan (2–3–0)	Minnesota State (5–3–0)	Omaha (6–1–1)	Omaha (6–1–1)	Omaha (7–2–1)	Omaha (7–3–2)	Colgate (9–5–1)	Bowling Green (11–3–2)	Providence (13–6–1)	Minnesota (10–7–1)	Colgate (14–7–1)	Michigan (15–7–0)	Providence (16–9–1)	Harvard (12–8–2)	Harvard (13–8–2)	Providence (19–11–2)	Bowling Green (19–10–5)	Bowling Green (21–10–5)	Minnesota (21–12–3)	St. Cloud State (19–18–1)	Quinnipiac (23–13–4)	13.
14.	Cornell	Quinnipiac (1–0–0)	Michigan (1–2–0)	Vermont (4–0–0)	Notre Dame (5–2–1)	St. Cloud State (3–5–0)	Quinnipiac (7–2–1)	Quinnipiac (8–3–1)	Bowling Green (10–3–1)	Bowling Green (11–3–2)	Colgate (9–6–1)	Bowling Green (12–3–3)	Colgate (13–6–1)	Yale (11–4–2)	Vermont (15–8–2)	Michigan (15–8–0)	Quinnipiac (18–8–2)	Yale (15–7–3)	Minnesota (17–10–3)	UMass Lowell (18–10–6)	UMass Lowell (18–10–6)	Providence (22–13–2)	Providence (22–13–2)	Boston College (21–14–3)	14.
15.	Denver	Cornell (0–0–0)	Quinnipiac (1–1–1)	Ferris State (2–3–0)	Vermont (4–1–1)	Minnesota–Duluth (6–4–0)	St. Cloud State (4–5–1)	Bowling Green (10–3–1)	Quinnipiac (9–4–1)	Quinnipiac (10–5–1)	Quinnipiac (10–5–1)	Quinnipiac (13–6–1)	Providence (14–7–1)	Merrimack (13–6–2)	Boston College (15–8–2)	Yale (12–6–3)	UMass Lowell (16–10–3)	Minnesota (16–9–3)	Harvard (14–9–3)	Minnesota (18–11–3)	Minnesota (19–12–3)	Harvard (19–12–3)	UMass Lowell (21–12–6)	Yale (18–10–5)	15.
	Preseason Sep 29	Week 1 Oct 13	Week 2 Oct 20	Week 3 Oct 27	Week 4 Nov 3	Week 5 Nov 10	Week 6 Nov 17	Week 7 Nov 24	Week 8 Dec 1	Week 9 Dec 8	Week 10 Dec 15	Week 11 Jan 5	Week 12 Jan 12	Week 13 Jan 19	Week 14 Jan 26	Week 15 Feb 2	Week 16 Feb 9	Week 17 Feb 16	Week 18 Feb 23	Week 19 Mar 2	Week 20 Mar 9	Week 21 Mar 16	Week 22 Mar 23	Final Apr 13	
		Dropped: Notre Dame; Wisconsin; Denver	Dropped: Cornell	Dropped: Quinnipiac	Dropped: Ferris State; Michigan	Dropped: Providence; Notre Dame	Dropped: Union	Dropped: St. Cloud State	Dropped: Boston College	None	None	Dropped: Colgate	Dropped: Denver	Dropped: Quinnipiac; Minnesota; Providence	Dropped: Colgate; Yale; Merrimack	Dropped: Vermont	Dropped: Yale	Dropped: UMass Lowell; Michigan	None	Dropped: Harvard	None	Dropped: Yale	Dropped: Bowling Green	Dropped: UMass Lowell	
