= Brandon Tanev =

Canadian ice hockey player (born 1991)

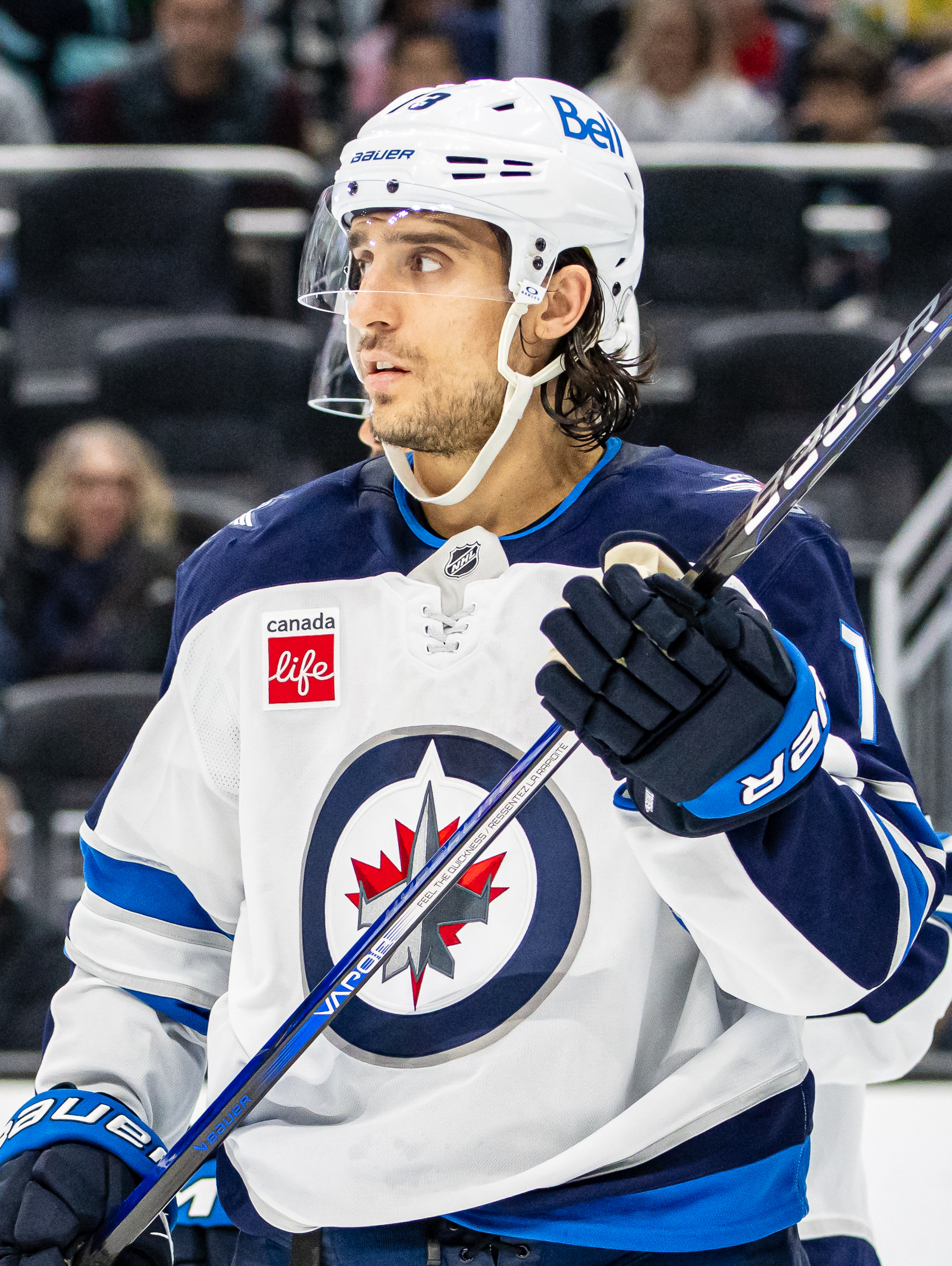
- Tanev with the Winnipeg Jets in 2025
- Born: December 31, 1991 (age 34) Toronto, Ontario, Canada
- Height: 6 ft 0 in (183 cm)
- Weight: 190 lb (86 kg; 13 st 8 lb)
- Position: Left wing
- Shoots: Left
- NHL team (P) Cur. team Former teams: Utah Mammoth; Tucson Roadrunners (AHL); Winnipeg Jets; Pittsburgh Penguins; Seattle Kraken
- National team: Canada
- NHL draft: Undrafted
- Playing career: 2016–present

Brandon Tanev (born December 31, 1991) is a Canadian professional ice hockey player who is a left winger for the Tucson Roadrunners of the American Hockey League (AHL), while under contract to the Utah Mammoth of the National Hockey League (NHL). He previously played in the NHL for the Winnipeg Jets, Pittsburgh Penguins and Seattle Kraken.

Born in Toronto, Tanev followed his older brother Christopher Tanev into ice hockey, but both brothers were cut from their respective minor ice hockey teams for being too small at the age of 15. Tanev took some time off from the sport until he underwent a growth spurt at the end of high school. From there, he played two seasons of junior ice hockey with the Markham Waxers of the Ontario Junior Hockey League and the Surrey Eagles of the British Columbia Hockey League, respectively. After going undrafted by the NHL, Tanev spent the next four years playing college ice hockey for the Providence Friars of the Hockey East conference. He was instrumental in the Friars' championship title at the 2015 NCAA Division I Men's Ice Hockey Tournament, delivering the game-winning goal against Boston University to give Providence their first national championship in school history.

Upon graduating from Providence, Tanev signed a contract with the Jets. He spent most of the 2016–17 NHL season alternating between the NHL and the American Hockey League, but spent the following two seasons on a checking line with Adam Lowry and Andrew Copp. A free agent for the 2019–20 season, Tanev signed a contract with the Penguins, where his line with Teddy Blueger and Zach Aston-Reese was tasked with tiring out other teams' leading scorers. Tanev missed most of the 2020–21 season due to injury, rejoining the team for their short stint in the 2021 Stanley Cup playoffs. The Seattle Kraken selected Tanev in the 2021 NHL expansion draft, and he played with the team for the first half of their inaugural season before suffering an anterior cruciate ligament injury.

== Early life ==
Tanev was born on December 31, 1991, in Toronto, Ontario, Canada, the middle child of Mike and Sophie Tanev. All three sons began playing ice hockey at a young age, with Tanev spending his minor ice hockey career with the Toronto Young Nationals of the Greater Toronto Hockey League. Both Tanev and his older brother Christopher were cut from their respective minor hockey teams when they were 15 years old for being undersized, and Tanev did not play competitive hockey in high school at all.

In lieu of playing ice hockey, Tanev filled his adolescence with cross country running, track and field, and soccer, and he practiced his skating independently with a private skills coach. After experiencing a growth spurt during his final year at East York Collegiate Institute, Tanev was able to secure a roster spot with the Markham Waxers of the Ontario Junior Hockey League (OJHL). Upon returning to the sport, Tanev scored 16 goals and 42 points in 46 regular-season games for Markham. He added another four points in six postseason games and was named Markham's rookie of the year. After spending the offseason playing in the Vancouver Canucks' prospect camp, Tanev joined the Surrey Eagles of the British Columbia Hockey League. There, he scored 11 goals in 58 regular season games, and an additional three goals in 10 playoff games.

== Playing career ==
=== College ===
Overlooked in the NHL entry draft, Tanev committed to play college ice hockey for the Providence Friars of the Hockey East conference beginning in the 2012–13 season. Tanev made his collegiate debut on October 13, 2012, skating on the left wing of a line that also featured Noel Acciari and Chris Rooney for the Friars' 4–2 loss to Boston University. His first collegiate goal and assist both came in a 3–2 win over Vermont on November 2. His second goal of the year came on November 24, capping off the Friars' 7–0 rout of Brown University in the annual Mayor's Cup rivalry game. That January, Tanev provided a goal and an assist in the Friars' 6–5 road victory over New Hampshire, Providence's first win at the Whittemore Center since 2004. Tanev finished his freshman season at Providence with four goals, seven assists, and a +6 plus–minus in 33 games.

After spending the summer at the Washington Capitals development camp, Tanev returned to the Friars for the 2013–14 Hockey East season. His first goal of the sophomore season came in the Friars' third-game, a 10–4 rout of American International College on October 19, 2013. Tanev scored again in Providence's conference opener, which they dropped 4–3 to Boston University on November 1, but did not record an assist until November 22, when he set up Mark Jankowski's shot in a 3–2 overtime loss to New Hampshire. He had a career-high three-point game on February 21 in a 4–3 victory over Massachusetts Amherst. He finished the regular season with six goals and 15 points, while Providence gained its first berth in the NCAA Division I Men's Ice Hockey Tournament since 2001. They defeated the Quinnipiac Bobcats in the first round of the NCAA tournament, with Tanev picking up an assist in the process, before losing to the Union Dutchmen in the East Region finals.

Tanev's first goal of the 2014–15 NCAA season came on November 25, when Providence shut out the Army Black Knights 3–0. He played in his 100th collegiate hockey game on February 14, a 3–2 win over Notre Dame, becoming the 148th Friar in program history to reach the milestone and the fifth of the season. Playing in 39 games that season, Tanev had a career-high 10 goals and 13 assists for 23 points. Although New Hampshire eliminated Providence in the Hockey East tournament quarterfinals, the Friars still earned a berth in the 2015 NCAA Division I Men's Ice Hockey Tournament, facing Miami in the East Region semifinals. They went back-and-forth with Miami, ultimately taking the game 7–5, with Tanev scoring an empty net goal with 6.3 seconds left in the game. He did the same in the East Region finals, providing one of two empty net goals to defeat the Denver Pioneers 4–1 and advance to the Frozen Four. Providence went on to defeat Nebraska-Omaha 4–1 in the Frozen Four match, and Tanev went on to score the game-winning goal against Boston University to win 4–3 and give Providence their first national ice hockey championship in history.

Tanev started his senior season of college hockey with the go-ahead goal in a 7–3 rout of Miami. Tanev scored another game-winning goal at the Florida College Hockey Classic: while Ohio State and Cornell battled for the Harkness Cup, Providence defeated Boston College 2–1 in the consolation game with goals from Nick Seracino and Tanev. Tanev's first collegiate two-goal game came in the penultimate game of the Friars' 2015–16 regular season, when they defeated UMass 4–1 at the Mullins Center on February 26. Tanev finished the regular season with 15 goals and 28 points in 38 games, while Providence's 25–5–4 season record (16–3–3 in conference play) gave them their first ever Hockey East regular-season championship title. He added an assist in a 2–0 shutout victory over Merrimack in the conference tournament quarterfinals, but they were eliminated by UMass Lowell in the next round. The Friars also suffered an early exit from the 2016 NCAA tournament as well, falling 2–1 to Minnesota Duluth in the Northeast Region semifinals. Tanev finished his collegiate ice hockey career with 35 goals and 42 assists in 149 games.

=== Professional ===
==== Winnipeg Jets (2016–2019) ====
Upon the completion of his collegiate hockey career, Tanev signed a one-year, two-way contract worth $925,000 with the Winnipeg Jets of the National Hockey League (NHL). He joined the Jets for the final three games of the 2015–16 season, making his NHL debut on April 5, 2016. There, Tanev skated on a line with Adam Lowry and Chris Thorburn for a game against the Anaheim Ducks. On July 21, 2016, he re-signed with Winnipeg for $875,000 on a one-year, two-way contract.

Tanev opened the 2016–17 NHL season with the Jets, making their opening night roster out of training camp. He scored the first two goals of his NHL career on November 4, pushing Winnipeg to a 5–3 victory over the Detroit Red Wings. He struggled to produce outside of that night, with two goals and two assists through 35 games, and was sent down to the Manitoba Moose, the Jets' American Hockey League (AHL) affiliate, on December 28 to make room for players returning from the injured reserve. He spent the remainder of the season alternating between Manitoba and Winnipeg, filling in for injured players as needed. He was first recalled on January 9, 2017, after Patrick Laine suffered a concussion, and was sent back down on February 7. Ten days later, Tanev was recalled again as defenceman Tobias Enström was sidelined with a lower-body injury, and both he and Julian Melchiori were returned to Manitoba on February 22, when the Jets were placed on a five-day break. Altogether, Tanev played in 51 NHL and 23 AHL games during the 2016–17 season. He had two goals, four points, and 26 penalty minutes for the Jets and two goals, nine points, and 13 penalty minutes for the Moose.

On July 10, 2017, Tanev signed a one-year, $700,000 contract with Winnipeg for the 2017–18 season. He spent the season on a checking line with Adam Lowry and Andrew Copp, as well as filling a role on the penalty kill unit. Tanev was one of a number of Jets to join the injured reserve during the 2017–18 season: he suffered an injury during a game against the New York Islanders on December 30, and in his absence, Joel Armia was promoted to Tanev's spot in the line-up. He missed seven games before returning to the Jets line-up on January 19, 2018, following their bye week. The return was brief, as Tanev exited the Jets' February 3 game against the Colorado Avalanche with an upper-body injury. He returned on March 8 for the Jets' victory over the New Jersey Devils. On March 27, Tanev recorded his first NHL hat-trick, scoring three goals in a 5–4 overtime win against the Boston Bruins. Tanev finished the regular season with 18 points in 61 games for the Jets before moving onto his first postseason appearance in the 2018 Stanley Cup playoffs. His first postseason NHL goal came on April 20 as part of a 5–0 shutout win to eliminate the Minnesota Wild and move on to the next round of playoffs. Tanev posted a total of four goals and six points in 17 playoff games before the Jets were eliminated by the Vegas Golden Knights in the Western Conference finals.

After the 2017–18 season, the Jets extended qualifying offers to 12 restricted free agents, including Tanev. He filed for contract arbitration and settled on a one-year, $1.15 million contract with Winnipeg on July 22, 2018. Playing on a fourth-line checking unit with Copp and Lowry, Tanev received his first game ejection on October 22 after his hit on St. Louis Blues skater Ryan O'Reilly. Tanev built a reputation during the 2018–19 season for his willingness both to score and to block shots, such as on February 1, when he was hit near the head by a puck off the stick of Columbus Blue Jackets defenceman Zach Werenski. He finished the regular season with a career-high 14 goals, 15 assists, 29 points, 278 hits, and 81 blocked shots in 80 games. Tanev missed the last two games of the regular season, as well as the first game of the 2019 Stanley Cup playoffs, after suffering a hand injury from Minnesota Wild forward Eric Staal, but he was able to return in time for Game 2 of the Jets' first-round playoff series against the St. Louis Blues. The Blues eliminated the Jets in six games, taking them out of the playoffs in the first round. Tanev, who had one goal and one assist in five playoff games, revealed after their elimination that he had surgery to repair the finger that Staal broke before joining Winnipeg for the postseason.

==== Pittsburgh Penguins (2019–2021) ====
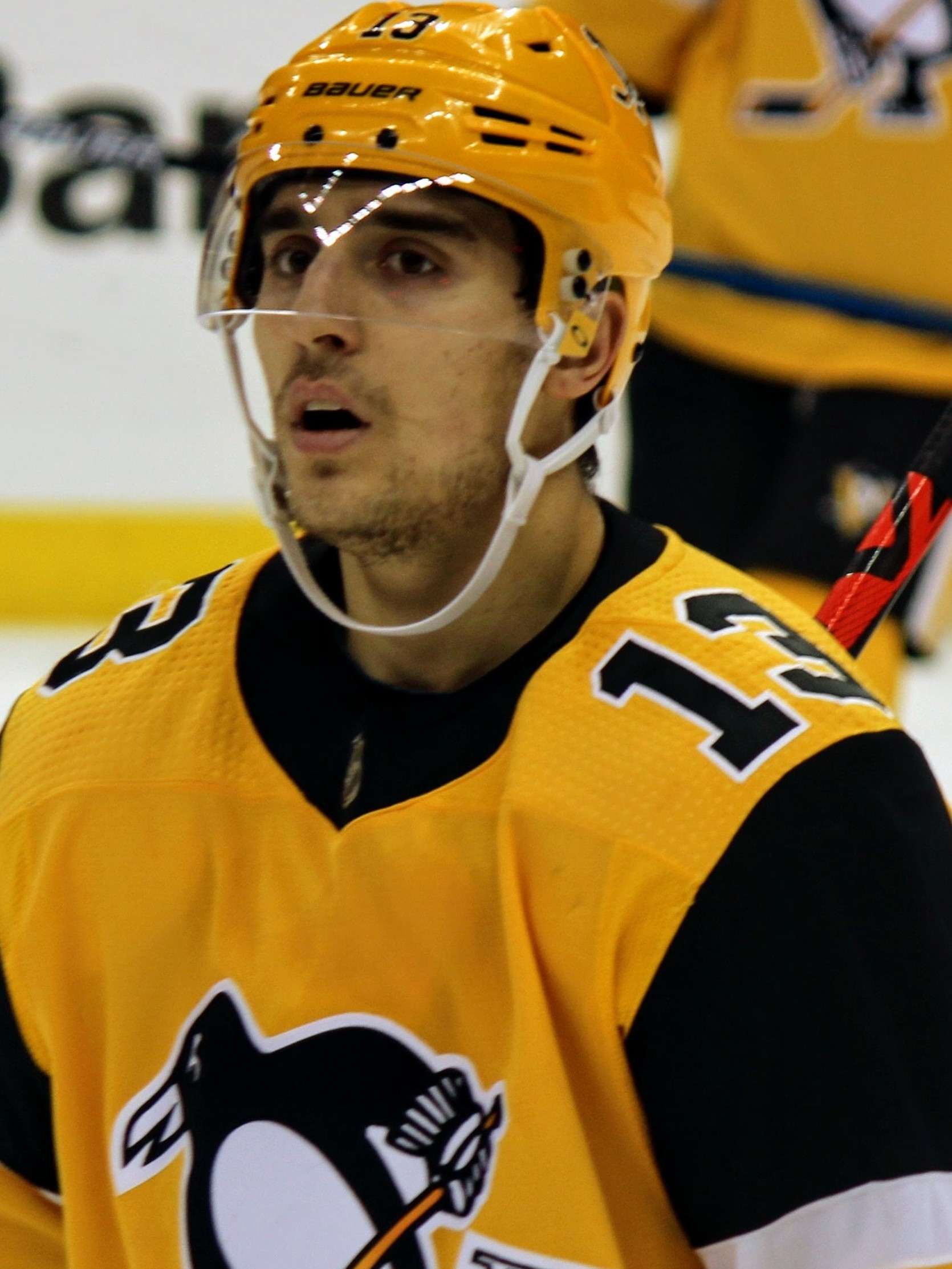
Tanev with the Penguins in 2019

A free agent after the 2018–19 season, Tanev left the Jets to sign a six-year, $21 million contract with the Pittsburgh Penguins on July 1, 2019. His first goal with the new team came on October 16, scoring short-handed against the Colorado Avalanche to take the game 3–2 in overtime. In doing so, Tanev joined Mario Lemieux as the only two Penguins to score a shorthanded overtime goal in franchise history. Tanev's primary line during the 2019–20 season, winging Teddy Blueger and Zach Aston-Reese, came about by accident after injuries required coach Mike Sullivan to shuffle his starting line-up. As the season progressed, they were used primarily to exhaust opposing teams' top scorers, allowing players like Sidney Crosby and Jake Guentzel to focus on their own offensive production. By the time that the 2019–20 NHL season was indefinitely suspended in March due to the COVID-19 pandemic, Tanev played in 68 games for Pittsburgh, with 11 goals and 25 points. He also led Pittsburgh forwards with 65 blocked shots and was on track to become the first Penguin since Brooks Orpik in 2008–09 to record 300 or more hits in one season. When the NHL returned to play in July for the 2020 Stanley Cup playoffs, Tanev was one of 31 players invited to the Penguins' quarantine bubble in Toronto. The Penguins took an early postseason exit, losing to the Montreal Canadiens in a four-game opening-round series, with Tanev allowing the turnover that led to the elimination goal.

Tanev opened the 2020–21 NHL season on the third line right wing, with Jared McCann on the left and Mark Jankowski centering. On March 16, 2021, he was ejected from a game against the Boston Bruins for a hit on defenceman Jarred Tinordi that forced the latter to leave the ice with a head injury. Both captain Sidney Crosby and team president Brian Burke defended Tanev, arguing that the hit was clean and Tinorid's injury accidental. Two days later, Tanev suffered an upper body injury during a game against the New Jersey Devils, and he missed six games before returning to the line-up on April 1. The return was short-lived, however, as Tanev suffered another upper-body injury on April 3 during a game against the Bruins and was listed as week to week. General manager Ron Hextall told reporters the following week that it was unlikely Tanev would return to the Penguins line-up before the 2021 Stanley Cup playoffs. At the time of his second injury, he had seven goals, 16 points, and a +12 rating in 32 games. He began skating with the team in practice just before the end of the regular season and was activated off of the injured reserve on May 16, the day the Penguins began their first-round playoff series against the New York Islanders. Although Tanev scored the game-winning goal past Semyon Varlamov with 3:36 left in the third period of Game 3, the Penguins were again eliminated in the first round, with New York taking the series in six games.

==== Seattle Kraken (2021–2025) ====
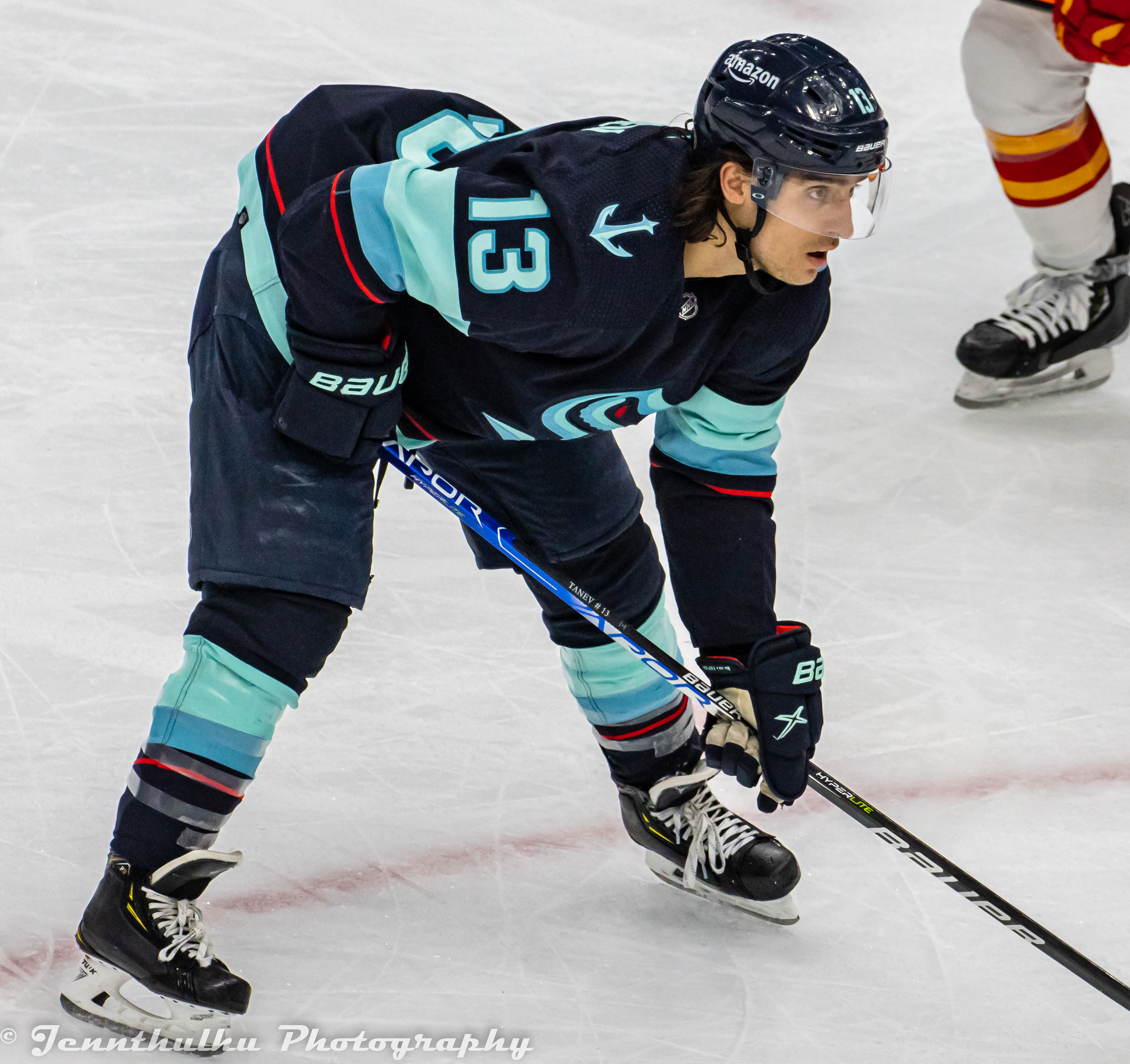
Tanev with the Kraken in 2023

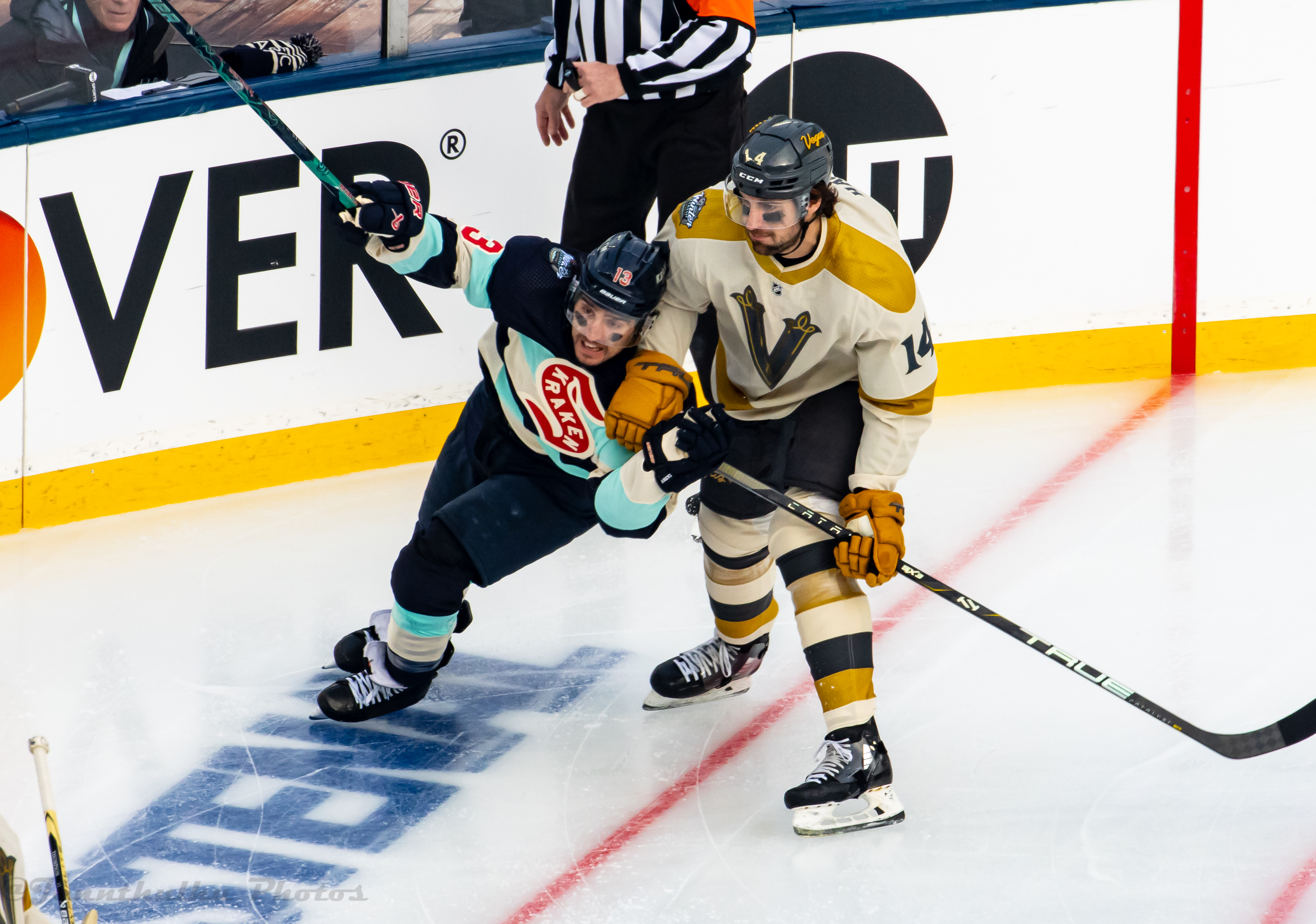
Tanev (left) with Vegas Golden Knights defenseman Nicolas Hague (right) at the 2024 Winter Classic.

Tanev was the Seattle Kraken's selection from the Penguins during the 2021 NHL expansion draft on July 21, 2021, becoming an inaugural member of the new team. On October 14, he scored two goals in the Kraken's first franchise win, a 4–3 defeat of the Nashville Predators. He followed this effort with two goals in the Kraken's first home victory at Climate Pledge Arena, a 5–1 victory over the Montreal Canadiens on October 26, 2021. Tanev was injured during a game against the Edmonton Oilers on December 18, 2021, and on December 27, the Kraken announced that he had suffered a torn anterior cruciate ligament and would miss the remainder of the 2021–22 season. At the time, he had scored nine goals through 30 games with Seattle and had become a favourite among both Kraken fans and teammates for his energy and grit on the ice. While recovering from his injury, Tanev took on an outreach role with the team which included him participating at youth hockey clinics and holding a virtual meeting with season-ticket holders.

==== Return to Winnipeg and Utah Mammoth (2025–present) ====
On March 7, 2025, Tanev was traded to the Jets in exchange for a 2nd-round pick in the 2027 NHL entry draft. Tanev left the Jets as a free agent for a second time, signing a three-year, $7.5 million contract with the Utah Mammoth on July 1, 2025.

== International play ==
Following the conclusion of the 2023–24 NHL season, Tanev accepted an invitation to make his international debut for Canada with the senior national team at the 2024 IIHF World Championship. He had four goals and five points in ten tournament games as Canada finished in fourth place.

== Personal life ==
Tanev is the younger brother of fellow professional ice hockey defender Christopher Tanev. His brother most recently appeared in the NHL with the Toronto Maple Leafs after spending several seasons with the Vancouver Canucks and Calgary Flames. Brandon and Christopher's younger brother Kyle has also played hockey, most recently appearing with the Caledonia Corvairs of the Greater Ontario Junior Hockey League and the Trenton Golden Hawks of the OJHL. Tanev and his family are of Macedonian descent, his grandparents having been born there.

Tanev has been active in promoting awareness and conversations around mental health within the NHL. With the Jets in 2018 and 2019, he participated in the #HockeyTalks campaign to promote mental health conversations and resources in Manitoba. In 2022, he was one of several members of the Kraken to partner with Premera Blue Cross for their own #HockeyTalks initiative.

The stunned expression on Tanev's face on his official team head shot with the Pittsburgh Penguins, which he attributed to having seen a ghost when his picture was taken, became an Internet meme in 2020. Tanev has recreated the image for his Seattle Kraken head shots and his second stint on the Winnipeg Jets. The expression has since been imitated by his former Penguins teammate Kasperi Kapanen in 2021 and NFL player DeeJay Dallas in 2022.

== Career statistics ==
=== Regular season and playoffs ===
			Regular season					Playoffs
Season	Team	League	GP	G	A	Pts	PIM	GP	G	A	Pts	PIM
2010–11	Markham Waxers	OJHL	46	16	26	42	16	6	2	2	4	0
2011–12	Surrey Eagles	BCHL	58	11	22	33	27	10	3	1	4	2
2012–13	Providence College	HE	33	4	7	11	6	—	—	—	—	—
2013–14	Providence College	HE	39	6	9	15	20	—	—	—	—	—
2014–15	Providence College	HE	39	10	13	23	20	—	—	—	—	—
2015–16	Providence College	HE	38	15	13	28	35	—	—	—	—	—
2015–16	Winnipeg Jets	NHL	3	0	0	0	2	—	—	—	—	—
2016–17	Winnipeg Jets	NHL	51	2	2	4	26	—	—	—	—	—
2016–17	Manitoba Moose	AHL	23	2	7	9	13	—	—	—	—	—
2017–18	Winnipeg Jets	NHL	61	8	10	18	18	17	4	2	6	11
2018–19	Winnipeg Jets	NHL	80	14	15	29	41	5	1	1	2	0
2019–20	Pittsburgh Penguins	NHL	68	11	14	25	16	4	0	1	1	0
2020–21	Pittsburgh Penguins	NHL	32	7	9	16	22	6	1	0	1	0
2021–22	Seattle Kraken	NHL	30	9	6	15	13	—	—	—	—	—
2022–23	Seattle Kraken	NHL	82	16	19	35	44	14	1	3	4	4
2023–24	Seattle Kraken	NHL	66	7	9	16	51	—	—	—	—	—
2024–25	Seattle Kraken	NHL	60	9	8	17	10	—	—	—	—	—
2024–25	Winnipeg Jets	NHL	19	1	4	5	6	13	0	0	0	18
2025–26	Utah Mammoth	NHL	56	0	3	3	50	6	0	0	0	4
NHL totals			608	84	99	184	299	65	7	7	14	37

=== International ===
Year	Team	Event	Result	GP	G	A	Pts	PIM
2024	Canada	WC	4th	10	4	1	5	4
Senior totals				10	4	1	5	4
