= 2015 NCAA Division I men's ice hockey tournament =

- 2015 Frozen Four logo
- Teams: 16
- Finals site: TD Garden, Boston, Massachusetts
- Champions: Providence Friars (1st title)
- Runner-up: Boston University Terriers (11th title game)
- Semifinalists: University of North Dakota (21st Frozen Four); Omaha Mavericks (1st Frozen Four)
- Winning coach: Nate Leaman (1st title)
- MOP: Jon Gillies (Providence)
- Attendance: 18,022 (Championship); 54,066 (Frozen Four); 118,995 (Tournament)

The 2015 NCAA Division I men's ice hockey tournament was the national championship tournament for men's college ice hockey in the United States in 2015. The tournament involved 16 teams in single-elimination play to determine the national champion at the Division I level of the NCAA, the highest level of competition in college hockey. The tournament's Frozen Four – the semifinals and final – were hosted by Hockey East at the TD Garden in Boston, Massachusetts.

Providence defeated Boston University 4–3 to win the program's first NCAA title. Providence’s win, combined with Yale in 2013 and Union in 2014, completed a 3-year streak of first-time champions. This was the first time such a streak had occurred since the first three NCAA men’s ice hockey tournaments from 1948-1950, when Michigan, Boston College and Colorado College each won their first title.

The championship game is remembered for a gaffe goal that allowed Providence to tie the score with less than 10 minutes to play.

== Tournament procedure ==
2015 Regionals (blue) and Frozen Four (red)

The tournament will feature four groups of four teams, organized into regional brackets. The four regionals are officially named after their geographic areas. The following are the sites for the 2015 regionals:

March 27 and 28
West Regional, Scheels Arena – Fargo, North Dakota (Host: University of North Dakota)
Northeast Regional, Verizon Wireless Arena – Manchester, New Hampshire (Host: University of New Hampshire)

March 28 and 29
East Regional, Dunkin' Donuts Center – Providence, Rhode Island (Host: Brown University)
Midwest Regional, Compton Family Ice Arena – South Bend, Indiana (Host: University of Notre Dame)

The winner of each regional will advance to the Frozen Four:

April 9–11
TD Garden – Boston, Massachusetts (Host: Hockey East)

== Qualifying teams ==
The tournament’s at-large bids and team seeding were announced on March 22. The NCHC had six teams receive a berth in the tournament, ECAC Hockey and Hockey East each had three teams receive a berth, the Western Collegiate Hockey Association (WCHA) had two teams receive a berth, and one team from both the Big Ten Conference and Atlantic Hockey received a berth.

| West Regional – Fargo | | | | | | | Northeast Regional – Manchester | | | | | | |
| Seed | School | Conference | Record | Berth type | Appearance | Last bid | Seed | School | Conference | Record | Berth type | Appearance | Last bid |
|---|---|---|---|---|---|---|---|---|---|---|---|---|---|
| 1 | North Dakota (2) | NCHC | 27–9–3 | At-large bid | 30th | 2014 | 1 | Boston University (3) | Hockey East | 25–7–5 | Tournament champion | 33rd | 2012 |
| 2 | Michigan Tech | WCHA | 29–9–2 | At-large bid | 11th | 1981 | 2 | Minnesota–Duluth | NCHC | 20–15–3 | At-large bid | 9th | 2012 |
| 3 | St. Cloud State | NCHC | 19–18–1 | At-large bid | 11th | 2014 | 3 | Minnesota | Big Ten | 23–12–3 | Tournament champion | 36th | 2014 |
| 4 | Quinnipiac | ECAC Hockey | 23–11–4 | At-large bid | 4th | 2014 | 4 | Yale | ECAC Hockey | 18–9–5 | At-large bid | 7th | 2013 |
| Midwest Regional – South Bend | | | | | | | East Regional – Providence | | | | | | |
| Seed | School | Conference | Record | Berth type | Appearance | Last bid | Seed | School | Conference | Record | Berth type | Appearance | Last bid |
| 1 | Minnesota State (1) | WCHA | 29–7–3 | Tournament champion | 4th | 2014 | 1 | Miami (4) | NCHC | 25–13–1 | Tournament champion | 12th | 2013 |
| 2 | Omaha | NCHC | 18–12–6 | At-large bid | 3rd | 2011 | 2 | Denver | NCHC | 23–13–2 | At-large bid | 25th | 2014 |
| 3 | Harvard | ECAC Hockey | 21–12–3 | Tournament champion | 22nd | 2006 | 3 | Boston College | Hockey East | 21–13–3 | At-large bid | 34th | 2014 |
| 4 | RIT | Atlantic Hockey | 19–14–5 | Tournament champion | 2nd | 2010 | 4 | Providence | Hockey East | 22–13–2 | At-large bid | 11th | 2014 |

Number in parentheses denotes overall seed in the tournament.

== Tournament bracket ==
Regional semifinals March 27–28
1 | Minnesota State (1) | 1
4 | RIT | 2
South Bend, Indiana – Sat/Sun
2 | Omaha | 4
3 | Harvard | 1
1 | Miami (4) | 5
4 | Providence | 7
Providence, Rhode Island – Sat/Sun
2 | Denver | 5
3 | Boston College | 2
1 | North Dakota (2) | 4
4 | Quinnipiac | 1
Fargo, North Dakota – Fri/Sat
2 | Michigan Tech | 2
3 | St. Cloud State | 3*
1 | Boston University (3) | 3*
4 | Yale | 2
Manchester, New Hampshire – Fri/Sat
2 | Minnesota–Duluth | 4
3 | Minnesota | 1

Regional Finals; March 28–29
4 | RIT | 0
2 | Omaha | 4
4 | Providence | 4
2 | Denver | 1
1 | North Dakota | 4
3 | St. Cloud State | 1
1 | Boston University | 3
2 | Minnesota–Duluth | 2

Semifinals; April 9
MW2 | Omaha | 1
E4 | Providence | 4
W1 | North Dakota | 3
NE1 | Boston University | 5

Championship; April 11
E4 | Providence | 4
NE1 | Boston University | 3

Note: * denotes overtime period(s)

== Results ==
=== Midwest Region – South Bend ===
==== Regional semifinal ====
| March 28, 2015; 4:00 pm | (1) Minnesota State | 1 – 2 (0–1, 1–0, 0–1) | (4) RIT | Compton Family Ice Arena, South Bend, Indiana; Attendance: 4,114 |

Game reference

Stephon Williams
Goalies
Jordan Ruby
Referees:
Geoff Miller
Cameron Voss
Linesmen:
Marc Sullivan
Bob Bernard

| | 0–1 | 04:30 – Alexander Kuqali (5) (Mitchell, Garbowsky) |
| C. J. Franklin (9) (Blueger, Jutzi) – PP – 30:52 | 1–1 |
| | 1–2 | 54:09 – GW – Josh Mitchell (16) (McGowan) |

4 min
Penalties
10 min
34
Shots
19

| March 28, 2015; 7:30 pm | (2) Omaha | 4 – 1 (2–0, 0–0, 2–1) | (3) Harvard | Compton Family Ice Arena, South Bend, Indiana; Attendance: 4,114 |

Game reference

Ryan Massa
Goalies
Steve Michalek
Referees:
Marco Hunt
C.J. Beaurline
Linesmen:
Bruce Vida
Joe Hutek

| Grant Gallo (3) (Peterson, Brady) – 01:59 | 1–0 |
| Avery Peterson (11) (Randolph, Ortega) – GW PP – 19:58 | 2–0 |
| | 2–1 | 43:09 – Jimmy Vesey (32) (Bergin, Criscuolo) |
| Tyler Vesel (8) (Parizek, Randolph) – PP EN – 59:24 | 3–1 |
| Jake Guentzel (13) (unassisted) – EN – 59:56 | 4–1 |

4 min
Penalties
8 min
29
Shots
34

==== Regional Final ====
| March 29, 2015; 7:30 pm | (2) Omaha | 4 – 0 (0–0, 0–0, 4–0) | (4) RIT | Compton Family Ice Arena, South Bend, Indiana; Attendance: 3,719 |

Game reference

Ryan Massa
Goalies
Jordan Ruby
Referees:
Geoff Miller
Cameron Voss
Linesmen:
Marc Sullivan
Bob Bernard

| Jake Randolph (5) (Snuggerud, Parizek) – GW – 41:01 | 1–0 |
| Austin Ortega (20) (Guentzel, Pope) – 55:36 | 2–0 |
| Justin Parizek (13) (Guentzel, Snuggerud) – 56:52 | 3–0 |
| David Pope (20) (Ortega) – EN – 57:42 | 4–0 |

6 min
Penalties
19 min
28
Shots
40

=== West Region – Fargo ===
==== Regional semifinal ====
| March 27, 2015; 7:45 pm | (1) North Dakota | 4 – 1 (1–0, 2–0, 1–1) | (4) Quinnipiac | Scheels Arena, Fargo, North Dakota; Attendance: 5,283 |

Game reference

Zane McIntyre
Goalies
Michael Garteig
Jacob Meyers
Referees:
Chris Perrault
Kevin Langseth
Linesmen:
Paul Tunison
Eric Froberg

| Tucker Poolman (8) (LaDue, Pattyn) – PP – 12:59 | 1–0 |
| Bryn Chyzyk (7) (Ausmus) – 27:09 | 2–0 |
| Drake Caggiula (17) (Stecher) – SH – 29:55 | 3–0 |
| | 3–1 | 58:34 – Andrew Taverner (6) (Pieper, MacMaster) |
| Luke Johnson (17) (Caggiula) – SH EN – 59:44 | 4–1 |

31 min
Penalties
25 min
30
Shots
25

| March 27, 2015; 3:30 pm | (2) Michigan Tech | 2 – 3 (OT) (1–0, 0–1, 1–1, 0–1) | (3) St. Cloud State | Scheels Arena, Fargo, North Dakota; Attendance: 5,283 |

Game reference

Jamie Phillips
Goalies
Charlie Lindgren
Referees:
Kevin Shea
Ryan Hersey
Linesmen:
Kevin Briganti
Chris Aughe

| Tanner Kero (20) (Petan, Hanna) – 07:18 | 1–0 |
| | 1–1 | 21:06 – PP – Kalle Kossila (6) (Morley, Prow) |
| C. J. Eick (3) (L'Esperance, Steman) – 50:54 | 2–1 |
| | 2–2 | 59:22 – EA – Jonny Brodzinski (21) (Russell, Benik) |
| | 2–3 | 68:11 – GW – Judd Peterson (4) (Rehkamp) |

6 min
Penalties
4 min
38
Shots
21

==== Regional Final ====
| March 28, 2015; 8:00 pm | (1) North Dakota | 4 – 1 (1–1, 1–0, 2–0) | (3) St. Cloud State | Scheels Arena, Fargo, North Dakota; Attendance: 5,307 |

Game reference

Zane McIntyre
Goalies
Charlie Lindgren
Referees:
Steve McInchak
Barry Pochmara
Linesmen:
Nick Bradshaw
Sam Shilkowsky

| | 0–1 | 01:29 – Jimmy Murray (5) (Rehkamp) |
| Andrew Panzarella (1) (Poolman, St. Clair) – 08:59 | 1–1 |
| Drake Caggiula (18) (unassisted) – GW – 26:49 | 2–1 |
| Luke Johnson (10) (unassisted) – 42:53 | 3–1 |
| Colten St. Clair (3) (unassisted) – EN – 59:19 | 4–1 |

4 min
Penalties
2 min
26
Shots
20

=== Northeast Region – Manchester ===
==== Regional semifinal ====
| March 27, 2015; 2:00 pm | (1) Boston University | 3 – 2 OT (0–0, 0–1, 2–1, 1–0) | (4) Yale | Verizon Wireless Arena, Manchester, New Hampshire; Attendance: 5,123 |

Game reference

Matt O'Connor
Goalies
Alex Lyon
Referees:
Todd Anderson
Derek Sheperd
Linesmen:
Paul Carnathan
John Philo

| | 0–1 | 33:19 – PP – Nate Repensky (3) (Doherty, DiChiara) |
| Ahti Oksanen (24) (Greer, Hohmann) – 48:21 | 1–1 |
| Evan Rodrigues (19) (O'Regan) – 51:20 | 2–1 |
| | 2–2 | 53:12 – Frankie DiChiara (9) (Learned, Cooper) |
| Danny O'Regan (22) (Eichel, Rodrigues) – 67:27 | 3–2 |

8 min
Penalties
10 min
42
Shots
23

| March 27, 2015; 5:30 pm | (2) Minnesota–Duluth | 4 – 1 (3–0, 1–0, 0–1) | (3) Minnesota | Verizon Wireless Arena, Manchester, New Hampshire; Attendance: 6,522 |

Game reference

Kasimir Kaskisuo
Goalies
Adam Wilcox
Referees:
Chip McDonald
Scott Whittemore
Linesmen:
Jason Shattie
Dan Taggart

| Tony Cameranesi (9) (Raskob, Kuhlman) – 12:49 | 1–0 |
| Justin Crandall (13) (Kotyk, Osterberg) – GW – 15:27 | 2–0 |
| Willie Raskob (3) (Cameranesi, Farley) – 18:48 | 3–0 |
| Carson Soucy (6) (Toninato, Welinski) – PP – 31:02 | 4–0 |
| | 4–1 | 55:06 – Seth Ambroz (12) (Lettieri, Boyd) |

2 min
Penalties
4 min
33
Shots
32

==== Regional Final ====
| March 28, 2015; 5:30 pm | (1) Boston University | 3 – 2 (1–0, 1–2, 1–0) | (2) Minnesota–Duluth | Verizon Wireless Arena, Manchester, New Hampshire; Attendance: 4,721 |

Game reference

Matt O'Connor
Goalies
Kasimir Kaskisuo
Referees:
Butch Mousseaux
Pete Friesema
Linesmen:
Matt Tyree
Matt Ulwelling

| Evan Rodrigues (20) (Fortunato) – 07:17 | 1–0 |
| | 1–1 | 20:37 – Willie Raskob (4) (Corrin) |
| Matt Lane (8) (Piccinich, Phelps) – 23:32 | 2–1 |
| | 2–2 | 27:31 – Kyle Osterberg (7) (unassisted) |
| Evan Rodrigues (21) (Grzelcyk, O'Regan) – GW PP – 57:36 | 3–2 |

2 min
Penalties
6 min
30
Shots
29

=== East Region – Providence ===
==== Regional semifinal ====
| March 28, 2015; 6:30 pm | (1) Miami | 5 – 7 (2–2, 0–4, 3–1) | (4) Providence | Dunkin' Donuts Center, Providence, Rhode Island; Attendance: 7,908 |

Game reference

Jay Williams (out 32:30)
Ryan McKay (in 32:30)
Goalies
Jon Gillies
Referees:
Peter Feola
Kevin Curtis
Linesmen:
Jim Briggs
Ryan Knapp

| Cody Murphy (13) (Greenberg, Belpedio) – 04:10 | 1–0 |
| | 1–1 | 10:14 – Trevor Mingoia (14) (unassisted) |
| Anthony Louis (9) (Joyaux, Czarnik) – 13:18 | 2–1 |
| | 2–2 | 14:47 – Shane Luke (12) (Saracino, Mauermann) |
| | 2–3 | 25:33 – Steven McParland (6) (Parisi, Saracino) |
| | 2–4 | 32:00 – Brian Pinho (6) (Acciari, McKenzie) |
| | 2–5 | 32:30 – Noel Acciari (13) (Mingoia, Tanev) |
| | 2–6 | 38:43 – GW – Shane Luke (13) (Jankowski, McParland) |
| Matthew Caito (4) (Czarnik, Louis) – EA – 51:26 | 3–6 |
| Devin Loe (2) (Kuraly, Richart) – EA – 54:14 | 4–6 |
| Sean Kuraly (19) (Caito) – EA – 58:27 | 5–6 |
| | 5–7 | 59:53 – EN Brandon Tanev (8) (Florentino) |

6 min
Penalties
4 min
34
Shots
36

| March 28, 2015; 3:00 pm | (2) Denver | 5 – 2 (2–1, 0–0, 3–1) | (3) Boston College | Dunkin' Donuts Center, Providence, Rhode Island; Attendance: 7,908 |

Game reference

Tanner Jaillet
Goalies
Thatcher Demko
Referees:
Ryan Sweeney
Eugene Binda, Jr.
Linesmen:
Tony Carissimo
Brendan Blanchard

| Joey LaLeggia (14) (Doremus) – PP – 4:48 | 1–0 |
| | 1–1 | 16:51 – Mike Matheson (3) (Gilmour, Sanford) |
| Trevor Moore (22) (Loney, Shore) – 19:53 | 2–1 |
| Will Butcher (4) (Doremus, Moore) – GW – 48:05 | 3–1 |
| Grant Arnold (1) (Jacobson, Tabrum) – 49:04 | 4–1 |
| | 4–2 | 54:51 – PP Ryan Fitzgerald (17) (Matheson) |
| Grant Arnold (2) (Jacobson, Tabrum) – EN – 58:47 | 5–2 |

4 min
Penalties
4 min
28
Shots
24

==== Regional Final ====
| March 29, 2015; 5:00 pm | (2) Denver | 1 – 4 (0–0, 0–1, 1–3) | (4) Providence | Dunkin' Donuts Center, Providence, Rhode Island; Attendance: 6,326 |

Game reference

Tanner Jaillet
Goalies
Jon Gillies
Referees:
Peter Feola
Kevin Curtis
Linesmen:
Jim Briggs
Ryan Knapp

| | 0–1 | 34:22 – PP – Noel Acciari (14) (Luke, Walman) |
| Joey LaLeggia (15) (Shore, Butcher) – PP – 47:52 | 1–1 |
| | 1–2 | 54:59 – GW PP – Tom Parisi (4) (Walman, Luke) |
| | 1–3 | 58:28 – EN – Brandon Tanev (9) (Walman, Monk) |
| | 1–4 | 59:07 – EN – Kevin Rooney (7) (unassisted) |

19 min
Penalties
8 min
24
Shots
24

=== Frozen Four – Boston ===
==== Semifinal ====
| April 9, 2015; 8:30 pm ESPN2 | (W1) North Dakota | 3 – 5 (0–2, 1–2, 2–1) | (NE1) Boston University | TD Garden, Boston; Attendance: 18,022 |

Game reference

Zane McIntyre
Goalies
Matt O'Connor
Referees:
Marco Hunt
C.J. Beaurline
Linesmen:
Joe Hutek
Bruce Vida

| | 0–1 | 04:59 – PP – Jack Eichel (25) (O'Regan, Oksanen) |
| | 0–2 | 19:12 – PP – Brandon Hickey (6) (Hohmann, Baillargeon) |
| Luke Johnson (11) (Poolman, Schmaltz) – PP – 20:44 | 1–2 |
| | 1–3 | 31:20 – A. J. Greer (3) (Eichel, Diffley) |
| | 1–4 | 13:10 – GW – Doyle Somerby (1) (Diffley) |
| Troy Stecher (3) (unassisted) – 52:10 | 2–4 |
| Connor Gaarder (9) (Mattson, O'Donnell) – 56:17 | 3–4 |
| | 3–5 | 59:41 – EN – Jack Eichel (26) (Hohmann, Grzelcyk) |

10 min
Penalties
10 min
39
Shots
28

| April 9, 2015; 5:00 pm ESPN2 | (MW2) Omaha | 1 – 4 (0–0, 0–2, 1–2) | (E4) Providence | TD Garden, Boston; Attendance: 18,022 |

Game reference

Ryan Massa
Goalies
Jon Gillies
Referees:
Peter Feola
Kevin Curtis
Linesmen:
Jim Briggs
Ryan Knapp

| | 0–1 | 31:02 – Noel Acciari (15) (Saracino, Pinho) |
| | 0–2 | 34:58 – GW – Mark Jankowski (7) (Saracino, Walman) |
| Jake Guentzel (14) (Vesel) – 50:46 | 1–2 |
| | 1–3 | 51:10 – Trevor Mingoia (15) (Jankowski, Mauermann) |
| | 1–4 | 59:29 – EN – Nick Saracino (14) (Rooney, Florentino) |

4 min
Penalties
4 min
26
Shots
48

=== National Championship – Boston ===
| April 11, 2015; 7:30 pm ESPN | (NE1) Boston University | 3 – 4 (2–1, 1–1, 0–2) | (E4) Providence | TD Garden, Boston; Attendance: 18,022 |

Game reference
| Referees: Steve McInchak; Barry Pochmara; Linesmen: Sam Shikowsky; Nick Bradshaw |

Scoring summary
| Period | Team | Goal | Assist(s) | Time | Score |
|---|---|---|---|---|---|
| 1st | PC | Anthony Florentino (3) | Acciari and Luke | 09:25 | 1–0 PC |
| 1st | BU | Ahti Oksanen (25) | unassisted | 12:50 | 1–1 |
| 1st | BU | Danny O'Regan (23) | Eichel | 12:54 | 2–1 BU |
| 2nd | PC | Mark Jankowski (8) – PP | Mingoia and Mauermann | 24:29 | 2–2 |
| 2nd | BU | Cason Hohmann (11) | Oksanen | 31:36 | 3–2 BU |
| 3rd | PC | Tom Parisi (5) | unassisted | 51:24 | 3–3 |
| 3rd | PC | Brandon Tanev (10) – GW | Rooney | 53:43 | 4–3 PC |
Penalty summary
| Period | Team | Player | Penalty | Time | PIM |
| 1st | PC | Tom Parisi | Holding the Stick | 05:53 | 2:00 |
| 1st | BU | John MacLeod | Hooking | 19:42 | 2:00 |
| 2nd | BU | John MacLeod | Interference | 22:33 | 2:00 |
| 3rd | BU | Jack Eichel | Hooking | 44:33 | 2:00 |

Shots by period
| Team | 1 | 2 | 3 | T |
|---|---|---|---|---|
| Providence | 6 | 17 | 20 | 43 |
| Boston University | 18 | 22 | 12 | 52 |

Goaltenders
| Team | Name | Saves | Goals against | Time on ice |
|---|---|---|---|---|
| PC | Jon Gillies | 49 | 3 | 59:51 |
| BU | Matt O'Connor | 39 | 4 | 58:11 |

== Record by conference ==
| Conference | # of Bids | Record | Win % | Regional Finals | Frozen Four | Championship Game | Champions |
|---|---|---|---|---|---|---|---|
| NCHC | 6 | 7–6 | .538 | 5 | 2 | - | - |
| Hockey East | 3 | 7–2 | .778 | 2 | 2 | 2 | 1 |
| ECAC Hockey | 3 | 0–3 | .000 | - | - | - | - |
| WCHA | 2 | 0–2 | .000 | - | - | - | - |
| Atlantic Hockey | 1 | 1–1 | .500 | 1 | - | - | - |
| Big Ten | 1 | 0–1 | .000 | - | - | - | - |

== Media ==
=== Television ===
ESPN has US television rights to all games during the tournament for the eleventh consecutive year. ESPN will air every game, beginning with the regionals, on ESPN, ESPN2, ESPNU, or ESPN3 and will stream them online via WatchESPN. The Sports Network holds Canadian TV rights to all games. The games are across the network on all five feeds—TSN1, TSN2, TSN3, TSN4, and TSN5. Although they are broadcast under the TSN banner, it is actually a simulcast of the ESPN feed with the ESPN announcers.

==== Broadcast assignments ====
Regionals

- West Regional: Clay Matvick & Sean Ritchlin – Fargo, North Dakota
- Northeast Regional: Dan Parkhurst & Billy Jaffe – Manchester, New Hampshire
- East Regional: John Buccigross, Barry Melrose & Quint Kessenich – Providence, Rhode Island
- Midwest Regional: Ben Holden & Blake Geoffrion – South Bend, Indiana

Frozen Four & Championship

- John Buccigross, Barry Melrose, & Quint Kessenich – Boston, Massachusetts

=== Radio ===
Westwood One has exclusive radio rights to the Frozen Four and will air both the semifinals and the championship.

- Sean Grande, Cap Raeder, & Adam Wodon

== All-Tournament team ==
=== Frozen Four ===
- G: Jon Gillies* (Providence)
- D: Anthony Florentino (Providence)
- D: Matt Grzelcyk (Boston University)
- F: Ahti Oskanen (Boston University)
- F: Mark Jankowski (Providence)
- F: Jack Eichel (Boston University)

* Most Outstanding Player(s)
