= Randy Wood (ice hockey) =

American ice hockey player (born 1963)

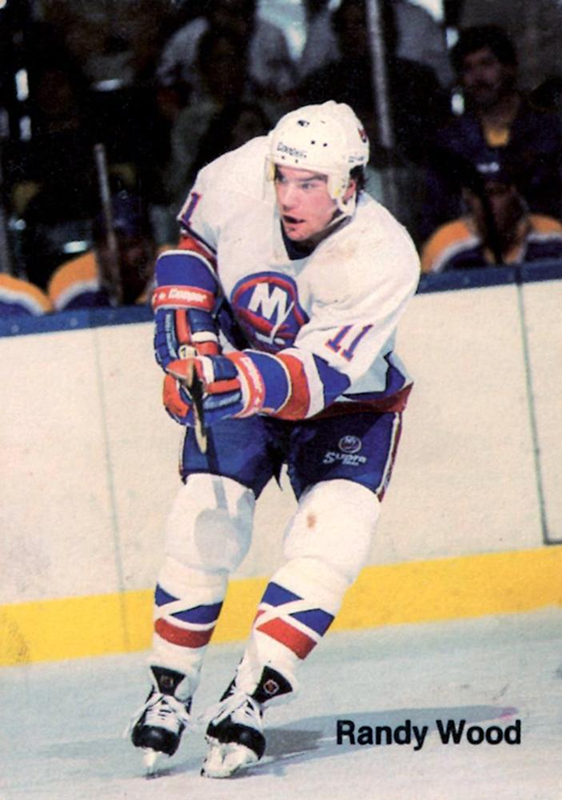
- Born: October 12, 1963 (age 62) Princeton, New Jersey, U.S.
- Height: 6 ft 0 in (183 cm)
- Weight: 195 lb (88 kg; 13 st 13 lb)
- Position: Left wing
- Shot: Left
- Played for: New York Islanders; Buffalo Sabres; Toronto Maple Leafs; Dallas Stars
- National team: United States
- NHL draft: Undrafted
- Playing career: 1986–1997

Randolph B. Wood (born October 12, 1963) is an American former professional ice hockey left winger who spent twelve seasons in the National Hockey League (NHL), playing for the New York Islanders, Buffalo Sabres, Toronto Maple Leafs, and Dallas Stars.

== Career ==
Wood's father, R. Norman Wood served as the head coach of Princeton University's hockey team between 1959 and 1965. Wood was born in Princeton, New Jersey, and grew up in Manchester-by-the-Sea, Massachusetts. Before beginning his professional career in the AHL, he spent three years playing college hockey at Yale University.

During the 1986–87 season, Wood played for the Springfield Indians in the AHL, tallying 47 points in 75 games. He was briefly called up to the New York Islanders, scoring one goal in six games. Over the next three years, he moved frequently between the minor league and the Islanders before securing a steady spot on their roster from 1988 to 1992. He was then traded to the Buffalo Sabres, where he spent three seasons. Later, Wood was picked up by the Toronto Maple Leafs in the waiver draft, traded to the Dallas Stars, and finished his career with a final season back with the Islanders.

== Personal life ==
Wood's passion for ice hockey has influenced the next generation, as both of his sons have pursued careers in the sport. Tyler is currently playing professionally with ERC Sonthofen, a team competing in Germany's Oberliga. Meanwhile, his younger son, Miles, has reached the highest level of the sport as a member of the Columbus Blue Jackets in the National Hockey League (NHL). Miles was drafted 100th overall by the New Jersey Devils during the 2013 NHL entry draft.

== Career statistics ==
=== Regular season and playoffs ===
			Regular season					Playoffs
Season	Team	League	GP	G	A	Pts	PIM	GP	G	A	Pts	PIM
1981–82	Phillips Andover	HS-MA	—	—	—	—	—	—	—	—	—	—
1982–83	Yale University	ECAC	24	5	14	19	10	—	—	—	—	—
1983–84	Yale University	ECAC	18	7	7	14	10	—	—	—	—	—
1984–85	Yale University	ECAC	32	25	28	53	23	—	—	—	—	—
1985–86	Yale University	ECAC	31	25	30	55	26	—	—	—	—	—
1986–87	Springfield Indians	AHL	75	23	24	47	57	—	—	—	—	—
1986–87	New York Islanders	NHL	6	1	0	1	4	13	1	3	4	14
1987–88	Springfield Indians	AHL	1	0	1	1	0	—	—	—	—	—
1987–88	New York Islanders	NHL	75	22	16	38	80	5	1	0	1	6
1988–89	Springfield Indians	AHL	1	1	1	2	0	—	—	—	—	—
1988–89	New York Islanders	NHL	77	15	13	28	44	—	—	—	—	—
1989–90	New York Islanders	NHL	74	24	24	48	39	5	1	1	2	4
1990–91	New York Islanders	NHL	76	24	18	42	45	—	—	—	—	—
1991–92	New York Islanders	NHL	8	2	2	4	21	—	—	—	—	—
1991–92	Buffalo Sabres	NHL	70	20	16	36	65	7	2	1	3	6
1992–93	Buffalo Sabres	NHL	82	18	25	43	77	8	1	4	5	6
1993–94	Buffalo Sabres	NHL	84	22	16	38	71	6	0	0	0	0
1994–95	Toronto Maple Leafs	NHL	48	13	11	24	34	7	2	0	2	6
1995–96	Toronto Maple Leafs	NHL	46	7	9	16	36	—	—	—	—	—
1995–96	Dallas Stars	NHL	30	1	4	5	26	—	—	—	—	—
1996–97	New York Islanders	NHL	65	6	5	11	61	—	—	—	—	—
NHL totals			741	175	159	334	604	51	8	9	17	40

=== International ===
Year	Team	Event	GP	G	A	Pts	PIM
1986	United States	WC	4	0	0	0	4
1989	United States	WC	10	1	1	2	6
1991	United States	CC	3	0	2	2	0
Senior totals			17	1	3	4	10

== Awards and honors ==
Award	Year	Ref
All-ECAC Hockey Second Team	1984–85	
All-ECAC Hockey First Team	1985–86	
AHCA East Second-Team All-American	1985–86	
