= R. Norman Wood =

Biographical details
- Born: June 10, 1930; Marblehead, Massachusetts
- Died: February 19, 2015 (aged 84); Manchester, Massachusetts

Playing career
- 1951–1954: Harvard

Coaching career (HC unless noted)
- 1959–1965: Princeton

Head coaching record
- Overall: 49–88–1

Reginald Norman 'Woody' Wood (June 10, 1930 – February 19, 2015) was an American ice hockey player and head coach who headed the program at Princeton for six years.

== Career ==
A Massachusetts native, Wood attended Harvard in the early 1950s, playing varsity hockey for 3 years and serving as team captain in his senior season. After graduating Wood served in the military before returning to college hockey as a head coach for Princeton in 1959. Wood's first season with the Tigers was a mild success as the team compiled a winning season for the first time in four years but afterwards the club lost ground and routinely finished near the bottom of the newly created ECAC Hockey standings. He stayed with the program until 1965 before stepping down in favor of John E. Wilson.

After leaving Princeton Wood returned to Massachusetts and joined the Boston-area real estate firm of Hunneman & Company. In 1969 he was elected as president and CEO of National Realty Investors and later became president of Moors & Cabot Properties, Inc.

== Personal life ==
While living in Massachusetts Wood became a season ticket holder for the Boston Bruins and would regularly take his sons to games. His eldest, Randy, ended up playing in the NHL for several years and was followed by Norman's grandson and Randy's son, Miles, who made his NHL debut with the New Jersey Devils in 2016.

Norman Wood died on February 19, 2015, at the age of 84.

== Head coaching record ==
Record table
Season	Team	Overall	Conference	Standing	Postseason
Princeton Tigers Independent (1959–1961)
1959–60	Princeton	12–11–0			
1960–61	Princeton	9–14–0			
Princeton:		21–25–0			
Princeton Tigers (ECAC Hockey) (1961–1965)
1961–62	Princeton	8–12–1	8–12–1	19th	
1962–63	Princeton	6–17–0	5–16–0	25th	
1963–64	Princeton	8–16–0	6–16–0	24th	
1964–65	Princeton	6–18–0	4–17–0	14th	
Princeton:		28–63–1			
Total:		49–88–1			
National champion Postseason invitational champion Conference regular season champion Conference regular season and conference tournament champion Division regular season champion Division regular season and conference tournament champion Conference tournament champion
