= Jon Gillies =

American ice hockey player

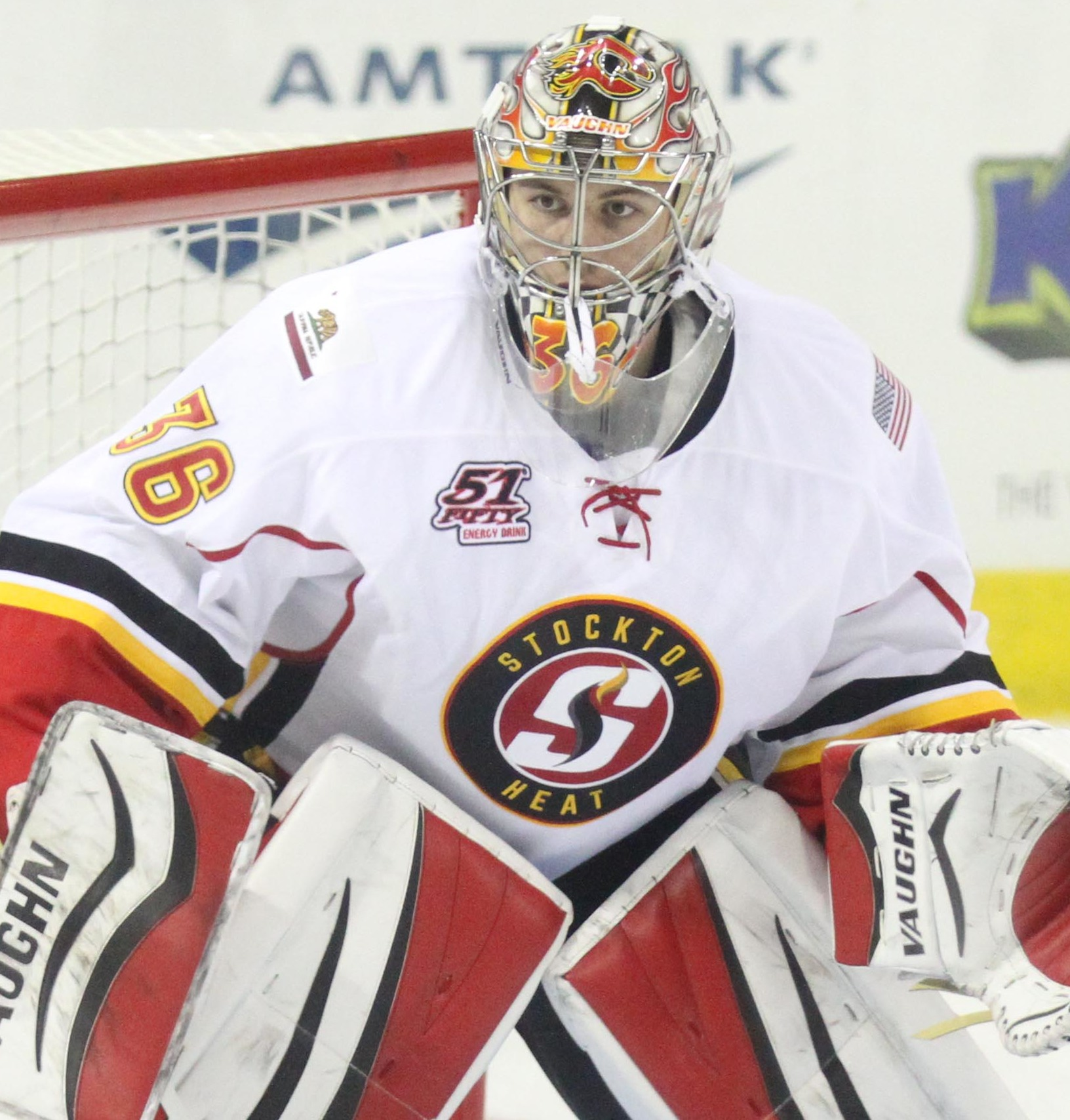
- Gillies with the Stockton Heat in 2015
- Born: January 22, 1994 (age 32) Concord, New Hampshire, U.S.
- Height: 6 ft 6 in (198 cm)
- Weight: 223 lb (101 kg; 15 st 13 lb)
- Position: Goaltender
- Catches: Left
- AHL team Former teams: Syracuse Crunch; Calgary Flames; St. Louis Blues; New Jersey Devils; Columbus Blue Jackets
- NHL draft: 75th overall, 2012; Calgary Flames
- Playing career: 2015–present

Jonathan Bruce Gillies (born January 22, 1994) is an American professional ice hockey goaltender currently playing for the Syracuse Crunch of the American Hockey League (AHL). He has previously played in the National Hockey League (NHL).

== Playing career ==
As a youth, Gillies played in the 2007 Quebec International Pee-Wee Hockey Tournament with the Middlesex Islanders minor ice hockey team, along with teammates Matt Grzelcyk and Miles Wood.

Gillies played collegiate hockey with the Providence Friars in the NCAA Men's Division I Hockey East conference. In his freshman year, Gillies's outstanding play was rewarded with a selection to the 2012–13 All-Hockey East First Team. He was the starting goaltender for the United States at the 2014 World Juniors and played nearly every minute of the tournament, but failed to medal. During his junior season, Gillies led the Friars to the NCAA title, being chosen as the Frozen Four Most Outstanding Player.

On April 15, 2015, Gillies ended his collegiate career by signing a three-year entry-level contract with the Calgary Flames.

On April 6, 2017, Gillies played his first NHL game of his career against the Los Angeles Kings. After stopping 27 shots, he recorded his first NHL career win, 4–1. He did not play during the Flames' short-lived playoff run and was assigned to their American Hockey League affiliate, the Stockton Heat, to help them finish their playoff season.

On October 9, 2020, Gilles signed as a free agent from the Flames to a one-year, two-way contract with the St. Louis Blues. After attending the Blues shortened training camp, Gillies was assigned to shared AHL affiliate, the Utica Comets for the 2020–21 season, registering 3 wins in 5 games.

With the 2021–22 season underway, Gillies belatedly signed as a free agent with the Maine Mariners of the ECHL on October 27, 2021. Remaining close to home and after making a lone appearance with the Mariners, Gilles was signed to a PTO with AHL affiliate, the Providence Bruins. He collected 3 wins in as many appearances before returning to the Mariners. On November 23, 2021, Gilles returned to the AHL after agreeing to a PTO with the Lehigh Valley Phantoms of the AHL, affiliate to the Philadelphia Flyers. He played in a solitary game with the Phantoms before he was signed by his former NHL club, the St. Louis Blues, on a one-year, two-way contract on December 9, 2021. He immediately was promoted to join the Blues roster, to help cover through a spate of injury woes for the team. He made his first NHL appearance in four years, debuting with the Blues in saving 36 of 39 shots of a 3–2 overtime defeat to the Anaheim Ducks on December 12, 2021. After his lone appearance with the Blues, Gillies's whirlwind season continued as he was traded by the Blues to the New Jersey Devils in exchange for future considerations on December 15.

On July 13, 2022, Gillies was signed as a free agent to a one-year, two-way contract with the Arizona Coyotes.

On March 2, 2023, while with the Tucson Roadrunners, the Coyotes traded Gillies to the Columbus Blue Jackets in exchange for Jakub Voráček and a sixth-round pick in the 2023 NHL entry draft. Gillies made his first start for the Blue Jackets on April 2, 2023, earning a win against the Ottawa Senators

After a years hiatus, Gillies returned to the professional hockey circuit in signing a contract with the Cincinnati Cyclones of the ECHL on October 10, 2024.

== Personal life ==
Gillies was born in Concord, New Hampshire and raised in South Portland, Maine, and comes from a hockey family. His grandfather, Bruce Sr., played at Norwich University. His father, Bruce, not only played at the University of New Hampshire, where he is a member of the school's Hall of Fame, but in the International Hockey League where he led the Muskegon Lumberjacks to the Turner Cup championship in 1985–86 and met his future wife, Debbie. His uncle, Chris, was a goalie at the University of Denver.

== Career statistics ==
=== Regular season and playoffs ===
			Regular season									Playoffs
Season	Team	League	GP	W	L	T/OT	MIN	GA	SO	GAA	SV%	GP	W	L	MIN	GA	SO	GAA	SV%
2010–11	Indiana Ice	USHL	25	15	6	2	1447	68	3	2.82	.906	2	0	1	82	3	0	2.20	.932
2011–12	Indiana Ice	USHL	53	31	11	9	2967	137	3	2.77	.915	6	3	3	359	17	0	2.84	.911
2012–13	Providence College	HE	35	17	12	6	2105	73	5	2.08	.931	—	—	—	—	—	—	—	—
2013–14	Providence College	HE	34	19	9	5	2027	73	4	2.16	.931	—	—	—	—	—	—	—	—
2014–15	Providence College	HE	39	24	13	2	2301	77	4	2.01	.930	—	—	—	—	—	—	—	—
2015–16	Stockton Heat	AHL	7	2	3	1	363	14	2	2.31	.920	—	—	—	—	—	—	—	—
2016–17	Stockton Heat	AHL	39	18	14	3	2215	108	1	2.93	.910	3	0	2	137	8	0	3.45	.915
2016–17	Calgary Flames	NHL	1	1	0	0	60	1	0	1.00	.964	—	—	—	—	—	—	—	—
2017–18	Stockton Heat	AHL	39	17	16	5	2231	94	4	2.53	.917	—	—	—	—	—	—	—	—
2017–18	Calgary Flames	NHL	11	3	5	1	605	29	0	2.88	.896	—	—	—	—	—	—	—	—
2018–19	Stockton Heat	AHL	45	16	18	5	2479	145	0	3.51	.889	—	—	—	—	—	—	—	—
2019–20	Stockton Heat	AHL	30	14	10	4	1675	75	1	2.69	.907	—	—	—	—	—	—	—	—
2020–21	Utica Comets	AHL	5	3	1	1	304	12	0	2.37	.902	—	—	—	—	—	—	—	—
2021–22	Maine Mariners	ECHL	1	0	1	0	58	2	0	2.07	.920	—	—	—	—	—	—	—	—
2021–22	Providence Bruins	AHL	3	3	0	0	180	5	1	1.67	.948	—	—	—	—	—	—	—	—
2021–22	Lehigh Valley Phantoms	AHL	1	0	1	0	59	2	0	2.05	.895	—	—	—	—	—	—	—	—
2021–22	St. Louis Blues	NHL	1	0	0	1	64	3	0	2.82	.923	—	—	—	—	—	—	—	—
2021–22	New Jersey Devils	NHL	19	3	10	1	941	59	0	3.76	.885	—	—	—	—	—	—	—	—
2022–23	Tucson Roadrunners	AHL	15	5	8	2	860	53	0	3.70	.878	—	—	—	—	—	—	—	—
2022–23	Columbus Blue Jackets	NHL	3	1	1	0	119	9	0	4.57	.864	—	—	—	—	—	—	—	—
2024–25	Cincinnati Cyclones	ECHL	12	3	7	2	702	44	0	3.76	.868	—	—	—	—	—	—	—	—
2024–25	Orlando Solar Bears	ECHL	7	4	3	0	385	16	1	2.49	.922	9	4	5	532	28	1	3.16	.902
2025–26	Orlando Solar Bears	ECHL	34	14	16	2	1875	90	2	2.88	.905	—	—	—	—	—	—	—	—
2025–26	Syracuse Crunch	AHL	3	3	0	0	180	4	1	1.33	.951	1	0	1	20	3	0	9	.500
NHL totals			35	8	16	3	1,788	101	0	3.39	.891	—	—	—	—	—	—	—	—

=== International ===
Year	Team	Event	Result	GP	W	L	T	MIN	GA	SO	GAA	SV%
2013	United States	WJC	1st place, gold medalist(s)	1	0	0	0	20	0	0	0.00	1.000
2014	United States	WJC	5th	4	2	2	0	238	11	0	2.77	.892
Junior totals				5	2	2	0	258	11	0	2.54	.899

== Awards and honors ==
Award	Year
College
All-Hockey East Rookie Team	2012–13
All-Hockey East First Team	2012–13
AHCA East Second-Team All-American	2012–13
NCAA Champion	2014–15
All-Hockey East First Team	2014–15
NCAA All-Tournament Team	2015
NCAA Frozen Four Most Outstanding Player	2015

Awards and achievements
Preceded by Scott Wilson	Hockey East Rookie of the Year; 2012–13	Succeeded by Mario Puskarich
Preceded by Thatcher Demko	Hockey East Goaltending Champion; 2014–15	Succeeded by Kevin Boyle
Preceded by Joey LaLeggia	NCAA Ice Hockey National Rookie of the Year; 2013	Succeeded by Sam Anas
Preceded by Shayne Gostisbehere	NCAA Tournament Most Outstanding Player; 2015	Succeeded by Drake Caggiula
