= Miles Wood =

American ice hockey player (born 1995)

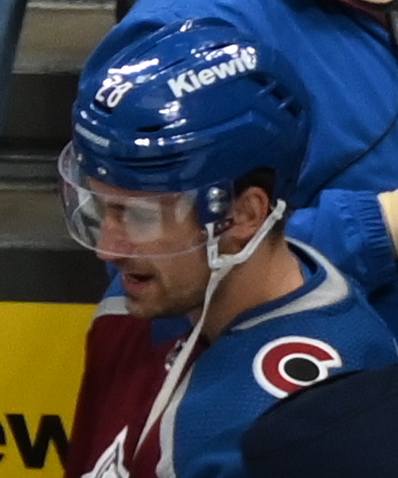
- Wood with the Colorado Avalanche in 2023
- Born: September 13, 1995 (age 31) Buffalo, New York, U.S.
- Height: 6 ft 2 in (188 cm)
- Weight: 195 lb (88 kg; 13 st 13 lb)
- Position: Forward
- Shoots: Left
- NHL team Former teams: Toronto Maple Leafs; New Jersey Devils; Colorado Avalanche; Columbus Blue Jackets
- National team: United States
- NHL draft: 100th overall, 2013; New Jersey Devils
- Playing career: 2016–present

Miles William Wood (born September 13, 1995) is an American professional ice hockey player who is a forward for the Toronto Maple Leafs of the National Hockey League (NHL). Wood was drafted by the New Jersey Devils in the fourth round of the 2013 NHL entry draft.

== Playing career ==
Wood was born in Buffalo, New York but grew up in Manchester, Massachusetts. As a youth, Wood played in the 2007 Quebec International Pee-Wee Hockey Tournament with the Middlesex Islanders minor ice hockey team, along with teammates Jon Gillies and Matt Grzelcyk.

Wood was playing at the prep school level with the Noble and Greenough School when he was drafted 100th overall, in the fourth round of the 2013 NHL entry draft by the New Jersey Devils. He remained at the school for the next two years, graduating in 2015.

Following the 2015–16 season, his freshman year with Boston College in the Hockey East, Wood ended his collegiate career and signed a three-year, entry-level contract with the Devils on April 8, 2016. He made his NHL debut for the Devils the following night on April 9, in a 5–1 win against the Toronto Maple Leafs.

On November 29, 2016, Wood scored his first NHL goal in a 3–2 loss to the Winnipeg Jets.

The 2017–18 season was a breakout year for Wood who set career highs in points and played in his first NHL playoff game. On November 12, 2017, Wood scored his first NHL hat trick in a 7–5 win over the Chicago Blackhawks. On February 18, 2018, Wood was suspended without pay for 2 games for boarding Tampa Bay Lightning forward Vladislav Namestnikov. Wood helped the Devils clinch a spot in the 2018 Stanley Cup playoffs by scoring the goal that won the game in a 2–1 win over the Toronto Maple Leafs on April 5, 2018. Wood ended the regular season with a career-best 32 points and signed a four-year contract with the Devils before the 2018–19 season.

Having played eight seasons with the Devils, Wood left the organization as a free agent and was promptly signed to a six-year, $15 million contract by the Colorado Avalanche on the opening day of free agency on July 1, 2023.

After an injury plagued 2024–25 season, and having completed his second year with the Avalanche, Wood was traded with Charlie Coyle to the Columbus Blue Jackets in exchange for prospect Gavin Brindley, a 2026 second round pick and a 2027 third-round selection on June 27, 2025.

On September 28, 2026, Wood was traded to the Toronto Maple Leafs alongside teammates Kirill Marchenko and Elvis Merzļikins.

== Personal life ==
When Wood was 11 years old he wrote a letter to Washington Capitals star, Alexander Ovechkin, asking him to autograph his hockey card. In the letter, Wood promised that if Ovechkin did not sign and return the card that he would check him the first chance he got to play against him when he made it to the NHL. Although Ovechkin never returned the card, he autographed a photo for Wood before facing him for the first time at the Verizon Center.

Wood's father, Randy Wood, played in the NHL for the New York Islanders, Buffalo Sabres, Toronto Maple Leafs, and Dallas Stars. His paternal grandfather, R. Norman Wood, served as the head coach of Princeton University's hockey team between 1959 and 1965. Wood's older brother, Tyler, briefly played in Germany during his career.

== Career statistics ==
=== Regular season and playoffs ===
			Regular season					Playoffs
Season	Team	League	GP	G	A	Pts	PIM	GP	G	A	Pts	PIM
2010–11	Salem Ice Dogs	EmJHL	13	4	5	9	8	2	0	0	0	0
2011–12	Salem Ice Dogs	EmJHL	14	8	1	9	28	—	—	—	—	—
2012–13	Noble & Greenough	USHS	15	8	10	18	18	—	—	—	—	—
2013–14	Noble & Greenough	USHS	28	29	25	54	16	—	—	—	—	—
2014–15	Noble & Greenough	USHS	17	17	18	35	8	—	—	—	—	—
2015–16	Boston College	HE	37	10	25	35	76	—	—	—	—	—
2015–16	New Jersey Devils	NHL	1	0	0	0	0	—	—	—	—	—
2016–17	New Jersey Devils	NHL	60	8	9	17	86	—	—	—	—	—
2016–17	Albany Devils	AHL	15	4	4	8	34	2	0	0	0	10
2017–18	New Jersey Devils	NHL	76	19	13	32	84	5	0	0	0	14
2018–19	New Jersey Devils	NHL	63	10	14	24	91	—	—	—	—	—
2019–20	New Jersey Devils	NHL	68	11	12	23	57	—	—	—	—	—
2020–21	New Jersey Devils	NHL	55	17	8	25	29	—	—	—	—	—
2021–22	New Jersey Devils	NHL	3	0	0	0	4	—	—	—	—	—
2022–23	New Jersey Devils	NHL	76	13	14	27	76	8	2	0	2	14
2023–24	Colorado Avalanche	NHL	74	9	17	26	75	11	3	0	3	13
2024–25	Colorado Avalanche	NHL	37	4	4	8	48	1	0	0	0	0
2025–26	Columbus Blue Jackets	NHL	54	8	6	14	26	—	—	—	—	—
NHL totals			567	99	97	196	576	25	5	0	5	41

=== International ===
Year	Team	Event	Result	GP	G	A	Pts	PIM
2015	United States	WJC	5th	5	0	0	0	6
2016	United States	WC	4th	10	1	0	1	8
Junior totals				5	0	0	0	6
Senior totals				10	1	0	1	8
