= Matt Grzelcyk =

American ice hockey player (born 1994)

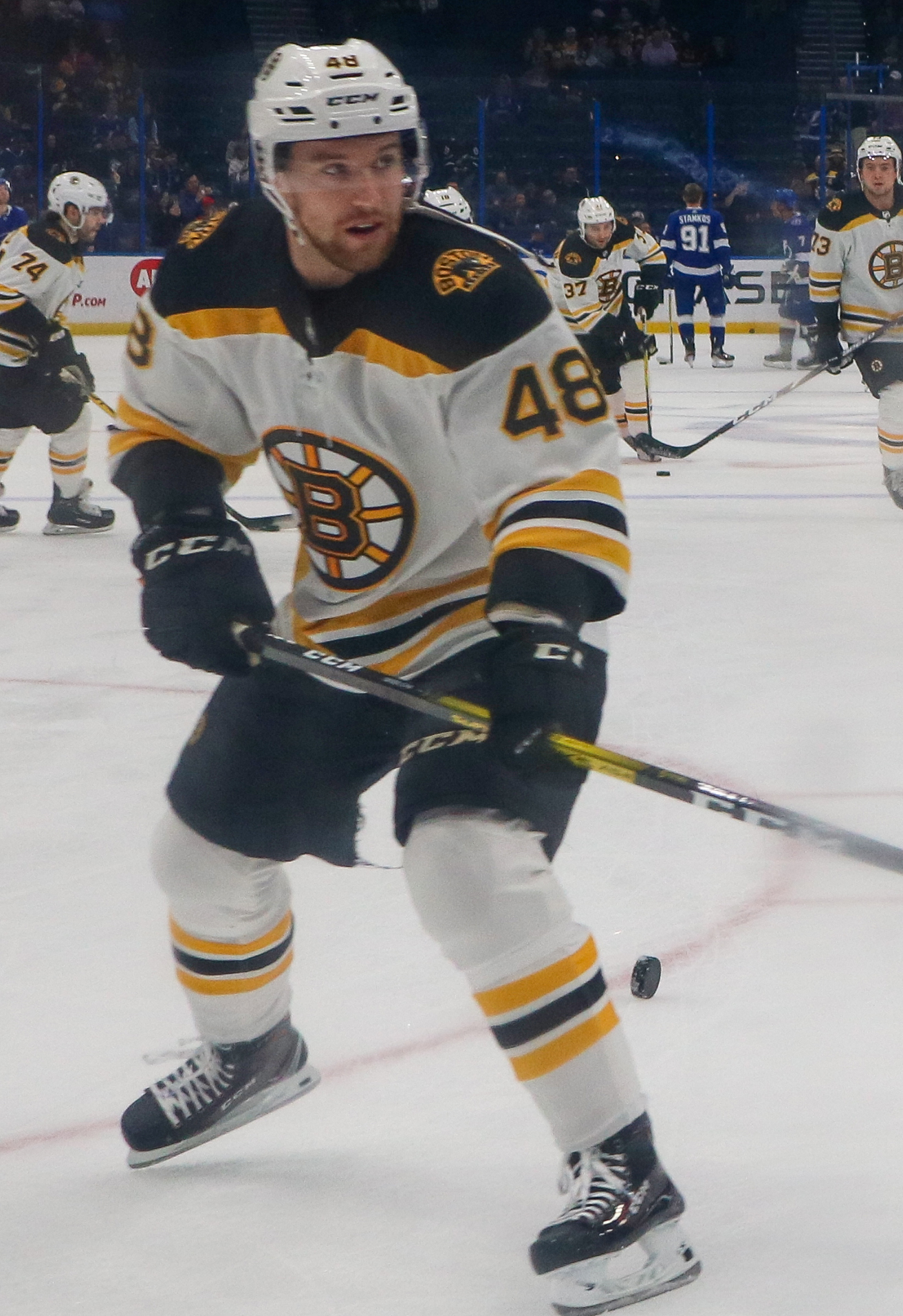
- Grzelcyk with the Boston Bruins in December 2019
- Born: January 5, 1994 (age 32) Boston, Massachusetts, U.S.
- Height: 5 ft 10 in (178 cm)
- Weight: 180 lb (82 kg; 12 st 12 lb)
- Position: Defense
- Shoots: Left
- NHL team Former teams: Buffalo Sabres; Boston Bruins; Pittsburgh Penguins; Chicago Blackhawks
- NHL draft: 85th overall, 2012; Boston Bruins
- Playing career: 2016–present

Matthew Grzelcyk (/ˈɡrɪzlɪk/ GRIZ-lik; born January 5, 1994) is an American professional ice hockey player who is a defenseman for the Buffalo Sabres of the National Hockey League (NHL). He was selected by the Boston Bruins with the 85th overall pick in the third round of the 2012 NHL entry draft, with whom he spent the first eight seasons of his NHL career, and has also played for the Pittsburgh Penguins and Chicago Blackhawks.

== Playing career ==
As a youth, Grzelcyk played in the 2007 Quebec International Pee-Wee Hockey Tournament with the Middlesex Islanders minor ice hockey team, along with teammates Jon Gillies and Miles Wood.

Grzelcyk attended Belmont Hill School before joining the USNTDP of the USHL, winning a gold medal at the 2012 U18 World Juniors in the Czech Republic. He committed to play for Boston University in the Hockey East Conference of the NCAA.

He was named to the Hockey East All-Freshman team in 2012. He was selected to the preliminary roster for the 2013 World Juniors but did not make the final cut.

He served as captain of the Terriers his junior and senior season. He was named an assistant captain at the 2014 World Juniors but the US did not medal. He scored the overtime winning goal in the 63rd Beanpot that gave BU their 30th title, and was named the tournament MVP. He played 124 games during his four-year career at BU, scoring 26 goals and assisting on 69.

On April 1, 2016, he signed a two-year entry-level deal with the Boston Bruins, starting with the 2016–17 season. He joined Boston's affiliate Providence Bruins of the American Hockey League (AHL) on an Amateur Tryout Agreement for the rest of the 2015–16 campaign.

On December 14, 2016, Grzelcyk made his NHL debut with the Bruins in a 4–3 OT loss to the Pittsburgh Penguins.

Grzelcyk spent 6 weeks of the 2017-2018 season playing with the Providence Bruins before returning to the NHL on November 22, 2017

On November 22, 2017, in a game against the New Jersey Devils, Grzelcyk got his first NHL assist on a goal from teammate Jake DeBrusk. On November 24, 2017, Grzelcyk scored his first NHL goal in a 4-3 victory over the Pittsburgh Penguins.

During the summer before the 2018–19 season, Grzelcyk signed a two-year contract to stay with the Bruins. Grzelcyk and the Bruins qualified for the 2019 Stanley Cup Finals, where he suffered a head injury as the result of an elbow to the head by Blues center Oskar Sundqvist. Sundqvist was suspended for Game 3 of the finals, although the Blues eventually won the Stanley Cup in seven games.

After eight seasons with the Boston Bruins, Grzelcyk left the organization as a free agent and was signed to a one-year, $2.75 million contract for the 2024–25 season by the Pittsburgh Penguins on July 1, 2024.

After going unsigned during the 2025 offseason, Grzelcyk joined the Chicago Blackhawks on a professional tryout agreement for the 2025–26 preseason on September 16, 2025; several weeks later, on October 5, Grzelcyk signed a one-year contract with the team for the 2025–26 season. In adding a veteran presence to the blueline for the rebuilding Blackhawks, Grzelcyk posted 12 assists through 69 appearances.

In the following offseason, having left the Blackhawks as a free agent, Grzelcyk familiarly remained un-signed over the summer before agreeing to a one-year, $850,000 contract with the Buffalo Sabres on September 25, 2026.

== Personal life ==
Grzelcyk's father and older brother, both named John, work at TD Garden. John Grzelcyk Sr. started working at Boston Garden in 1967 and has stayed with the organization ever since. On October 25, 2021, Grzelcyk's father was diagnosed with prostate cancer, while undergoing radiation treatments John Sr. continued work at TD Garden. The two elder Grzelcyks are members of the arena's "bull gang", which converts the building from hockey to basketball and back: John Jr. is also a Zamboni driver for certain Bruins games.

Growing up, Grzelcyk lived a block from the Charlestown rink at Edwards Playground. He also grew up with fellow 2012 NHL entry draft pick Jimmy Vesey. The two first met when they were around the age of six, playing hockey together for a team named the Middlesex Islanders.

== Career statistics ==
=== Regular season and playoffs ===
			Regular season					Playoffs
Season	Team	League	GP	G	A	Pts	PIM	GP	G	A	Pts	PIM
2009–10	Belmont Hill School	HS-Prep	31	2	18	20	30	—	—	—	—	—
2010–11	U.S. NTDP Juniors	USHL	36	1	9	10	28	2	0	0	0	2
2010–11	U.S. NTDP U17	USDP	55	2	16	18	40	—	—	—	—	—
2011–12	U.S. NTDP Juniors	USHL	24	1	10	11	6	—	—	—	—	—
2011–12	U.S. NTDP U18	USDP	60	3	20	23	22	—	—	—	—	—
2012–13	Boston University	HE	38	3	20	23	26	—	—	—	—	—
2013–14	Boston University	HE	19	3	8	11	16	—	—	—	—	—
2014–15	Boston University	HE	41	10	28	38	36	—	—	—	—	—
2015–16	Boston University	HE	27	10	13	23	36	—	—	—	—	—
2016–17	Providence Bruins	AHL	70	6	26	32	18	17	0	3	3	8
2016–17	Boston Bruins	NHL	2	0	0	0	2	—	—	—	—	—
2017–18	Boston Bruins	NHL	61	3	12	15	22	11	0	1	1	4
2017–18	Providence Bruins	AHL	14	0	4	4	14	—	—	—	—	—
2018–19	Boston Bruins	NHL	66	3	15	18	68	20	4	4	8	6
2019–20	Boston Bruins	NHL	68	4	17	21	34	12	0	1	1	4
2020–21	Boston Bruins	NHL	37	5	15	20	22	11	1	3	4	4
2021–22	Boston Bruins	NHL	73	4	20	24	24	5	0	0	0	6
2022–23	Boston Bruins	NHL	75	4	22	26	28	4	0	0	0	0
2023–24	Boston Bruins	NHL	63	2	9	11	37	3	0	0	0	2
2024–25	Pittsburgh Penguins	NHL	82	1	39	40	16	—	—	—	—	—
2025–26	Chicago Blackhawks	NHL	69	0	12	12	32	—	—	—	—	—
NHL totals			596	26	161	187	285	66	5	9	14	26

=== International ===
Year	Team	Event	Result	GP	G	A	Pts	PIM
2011	United States	U17	2nd place, silver medalist(s)	5	1	5	6	2
2012	United States	U18	1st place, gold medalist(s)	6	1	0	1	2
2014	United States	WJC	5th	5	2	4	6	2
Junior totals				16	4	9	13	6

== Awards and honors ==
Award	Year
College
All-Hockey East Rookie Team	2012–13
Hockey East All-Tournament Team	2013
All-Hockey East First Team	2014–15
AHCA East First-Team All-American	2014–15
Hockey East All-Tournament Team	2015
NCAA All-Tournament Team	2015
All-Hockey East First Team	2015–16
AHCA East First-Team All-American	2015–16
