= Mark Jankowski =

Canadian ice hockey player (born 1994)

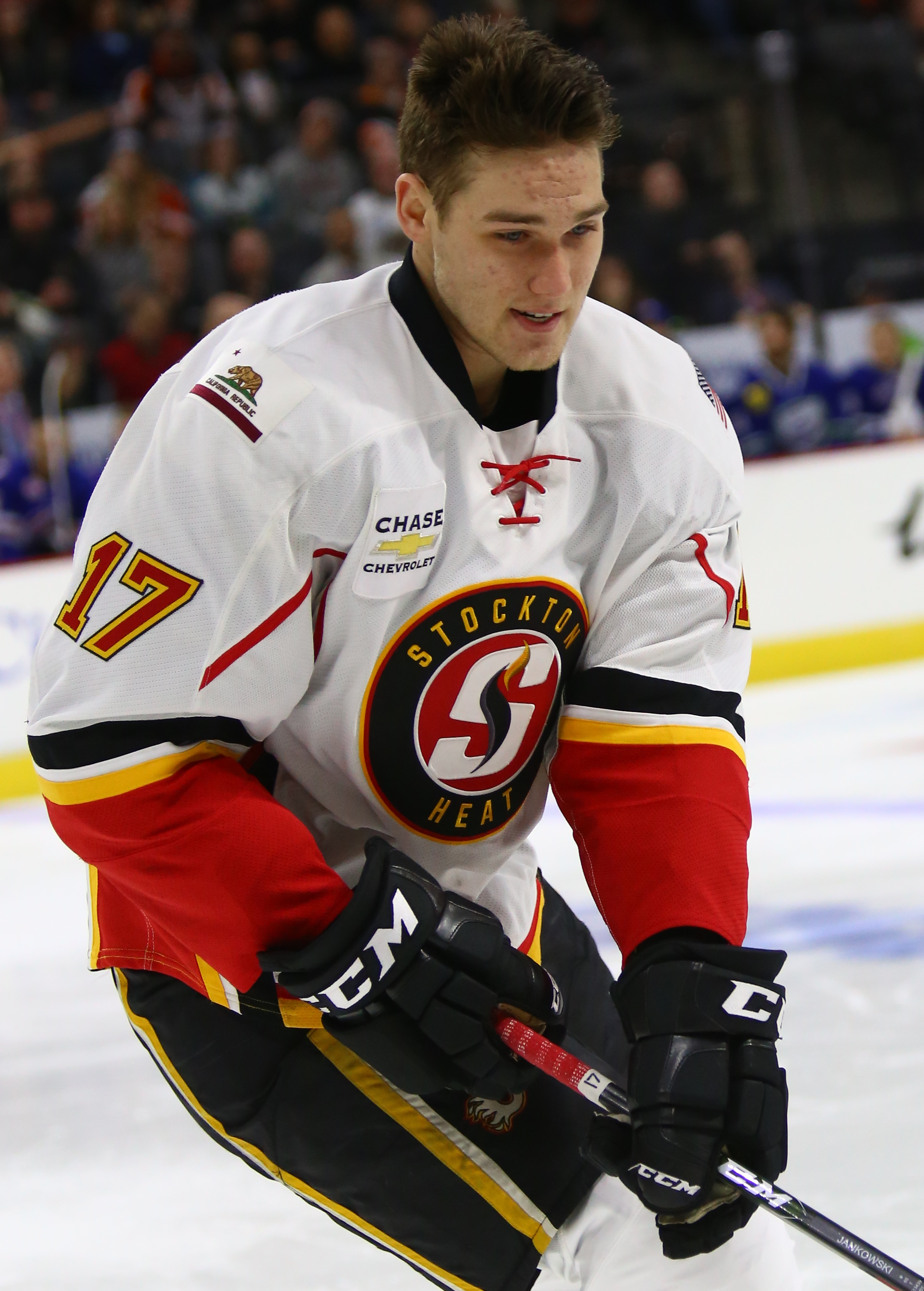
- Jankowski with the Stockton Heat in 2017
- Born: September 13, 1994 (age 31) Hamilton, Ontario, Canada
- Height: 6 ft 4 in (193 cm)
- Weight: 200 lb (91 kg; 14 st 4 lb)
- Position: Centre
- Shoots: Left
- NHL team Former teams: Carolina Hurricanes; Calgary Flames; Pittsburgh Penguins; Buffalo Sabres; Nashville Predators
- NHL draft: 21st overall, 2012; Calgary Flames
- Playing career: 2016–present

Mark Jankowski (born September 13, 1994) is a Canadian professional ice hockey player who is a centre for the Carolina Hurricanes of the National Hockey League (NHL). Jankowski was selected in the first round, 21st overall, at the 2012 NHL entry draft, by the Calgary Flames. He is the highest selected Canadian high school player in draft history, having played for Stanstead College for two seasons leading to the draft. Jankowski won the Stanley Cup with the Hurricanes in 2026.

== Playing career ==
=== Amateur ===
Jankowski was a top scorer at the midget AAA level, where he played for the St. Catharines Minor Midget AAA Falcons of the Ontario Minor Hockey Association's South-Central Triple A Hockey League. However, he went unselected in the Ontario Hockey League (OHL) midget draft as teams were concerned that at five feet, eight inches tall, he was too small to play the top level of junior hockey. He chose to play at Stanstead College, a prep school in Stanstead, Quebec. He played two seasons for Stanstead, scoring 31 goals and 73 points in the 2010–11 high school team's season and 53 goals and 93 points in 57 games in 2011–12. During his second season at Stanstead, Jankowski committed to play college hockey for the Providence Friars. Boston University, Cornell, Harvard, Maine, and Penn State were also interested in his services, but he decided to follow Friars coach Nate Leaman, who had previously shown interest in Jankowski while coaching Union College, to Providence.

During his two seasons in Stanstead, Jankowski quickly gained height, growing to 6'2" tall, while it was his play that caught the attention of scouts. He was eventually selected in the 2012 OHL draft, taken as the 11th pick in the 7th round by the Saginaw Spirit though he declined to join the team. The National Hockey League (NHL)'s Central Scouting Bureau ranked Jankowski as the 43rd best prospect for the 2012 NHL entry draft in its final ranking, an improvement from his 74th place rank in previous reports. Other analysts ranked him higher, including Craig Button of The Sports Network, who placed him 41st. The Calgary Flames selected him in the first round, 21st overall. He is the highest-ever draft pick out of a Canadian high school. The Flames received some criticism for going "off the board" and selecting Jankowski well above his expected draft place, but assistant general manager John Weisbrod stated that while Jankowski's talent was "raw", other teams were certain to select him in the first round if the Flames did not. General manager Jay Feaster argued that Jankowski was one of the most talented players available in the draft. At draft time his stats were 6'2.5", 168 pounds.

Jankowski initially committed to play for the Dubuque Fighting Saints of the United States Hockey League (USHL) in 2012–13 before Providence. However, he decided to bypass the junior league and move directly to college following the Flames' 2012 rookie development camp, stating he believed he was ready despite the fact that he will be one of the youngest players in the National Collegiate Athletic Association (NCAA).

=== Professional ===
Jankowski began his professional career on March 30, 2016, signing a two-year entry-level contract with the Flames. The deal began during the 2016–17 season; for the remainder of 2015–16 season, Jankowski played with the Flames' American Hockey League affiliate, the Stockton Heat. These games did not count towards his contract, which was slated to expire following the completion of the 2017–18 season. Jankowski was called up by the Flames in November 2016, making his NHL debut against the New York Islanders on November 28, 2016. On November 9, 2017, Jankowski scored his first career NHL goal against the Detroit Red Wings in a 6–3 win. On April 7, 2018, the last game of the Flames regular season, Jankowski recorded his first four-goal game in a 7–1 win over the Vegas Golden Knights.

After a largely disappointing 2019–20 season, in which Jankowski was limited to a fourth-line role and contributed with just 5 goals and 7 points in 56 games, he was released by the Flames as a free agent after he was not tendered a qualifying offer to retain his rights on October 8, 2020.

With the following day being the opening of free agency, Jankowski was signed to a one-year, $700,000 contract with the Pittsburgh Penguins.

On September 14, 2021, Jankowski was signed to a professional tryout contract (PTO) by the New Jersey Devils. After attending training camp and participating in their pre-season, Jankowski was released by the Devils without a contract offer. On October 15, 2021, he agreed to begin the 2021–22 season with the Rochester Americans of the AHL, signing a one-year deal with the primary affiliate of the Buffalo Sabres. After collecting 5 goals and 12 points through his first 13 games with the Americans, Jankowski was signed to a one-year, $750,000 contract, with the Buffalo Sabres on November 28, 2021.

As a free agent from the Sabres, Jankowski was signed to a one-year, two-way contract with the Nashville Predators on July 14, 2022. On March 8, 2024, he signed a two-year contract extension with the Predators.

During the 2024–25 season, at the NHL trade deadline, Jankowski was traded by the Predators to the Carolina Hurricanes in exchange for a 2026 fifth-round pick on March 7, 2025. Jankowski made his Hurricanes debut on March 9 where he would score 2 goals in a 4–2 victory over the Winnipeg Jets. Jankowski became the 3rd player to score multiple goals in their Hurricanes debut.

== Personal life ==
Jankowski is a native of Dundas, Ontario. His grandfather, Lou, was a longtime professional player who appeared in 127 NHL games with the Detroit Red Wings and Chicago Blackhawks in the 1950s. His granduncle was Hockey Hall of Famer Red Kelly and his father, Len, played college hockey with the Cornell Big Red. His uncle, Ryan serves as an assistant general manager with the Seattle Kraken. Jankowski's younger brother David signed an amateur tryout contract with the Calgary Flames in 2018.

== Career statistics ==
			Regular season					Playoffs
Season	Team	League	GP	G	A	Pts	PIM	GP	G	A	Pts	PIM
2010–11	Stanstead College	Prep	13	5	4	9	10	2	2	1	3	2
2010–11	Stanstead College	Que-HS	65	31	42	73	22	—	—	—	—	—
2011–12	Stanstead College	Prep	13	19	11	30	12	3	3	4	7	0
2011–12	Stanstead College	Que-HS	57	53	40	93	34	—	—	—	—	—
2012–13	Providence College	HE	34	7	11	18	10	—	—	—	—	—
2013–14	Providence College	HE	39	13	12	25	14	—	—	—	—	—
2014–15	Providence College	HE	37	8	19	27	14	—	—	—	—	—
2015–16	Providence College	HE	38	15	25	40	28	—	—	—	—	—
2015–16	Stockton Heat	AHL	8	2	4	6	0	—	—	—	—	—
2016–17	Stockton Heat	AHL	64	27	29	56	29	5	1	4	5	0
2016–17	Calgary Flames	NHL	1	0	0	0	0	—	—	—	—	—
2017–18	Stockton Heat	AHL	6	5	3	8	12	—	—	—	—	—
2017–18	Calgary Flames	NHL	72	17	8	25	33	—	—	—	—	—
2018–19	Calgary Flames	NHL	79	14	18	32	12	5	0	0	0	0
2019–20	Calgary Flames	NHL	56	5	2	7	14	5	0	0	0	0
2020–21	Pittsburgh Penguins	NHL	45	4	7	11	6	—	—	—	—	—
2021–22	Rochester Americans	AHL	32	10	17	27	18	10	6	1	7	2
2021–22	Buffalo Sabres	NHL	19	2	3	5	4	—	—	—	—	—
2022–23	Milwaukee Admirals	AHL	9	5	5	10	2	15	1	7	8	16
2022–23	Nashville Predators	NHL	50	7	5	12	18	—	—	—	—	—
2023–24	Milwaukee Admirals	AHL	40	15	32	47	51	—	—	—	—	—
2023–24	Nashville Predators	NHL	32	7	8	15	8	6	1	1	2	2
2024–25	Nashville Predators	NHL	41	4	5	9	15	—	—	—	—	—
2024–25	Carolina Hurricanes	NHL	19	8	0	8	18	7	0	1	1	0
2025–26	Carolina Hurricanes	NHL	68	11	10	21	16	19	1	4	5	16
NHL totals			482	79	66	145	144	42	2	6	8	18

== Awards and honours ==
Award	Year	Ref
College
Hockey East All-Tournament Team	2015	
NCAA All-Tournament Team	2015	
All-Hockey East First Team	2015–16	
AHCA East Second-Team All-American	2015–16	
NHL
Stanley Cup champion	2026	

Awards and achievements
Preceded by Sven Bärtschi	Calgary Flames' first-round draft pick 2012	Succeeded by Sean Monahan
