= Drake Caggiula =

Canadian ice hockey player (born 1994)

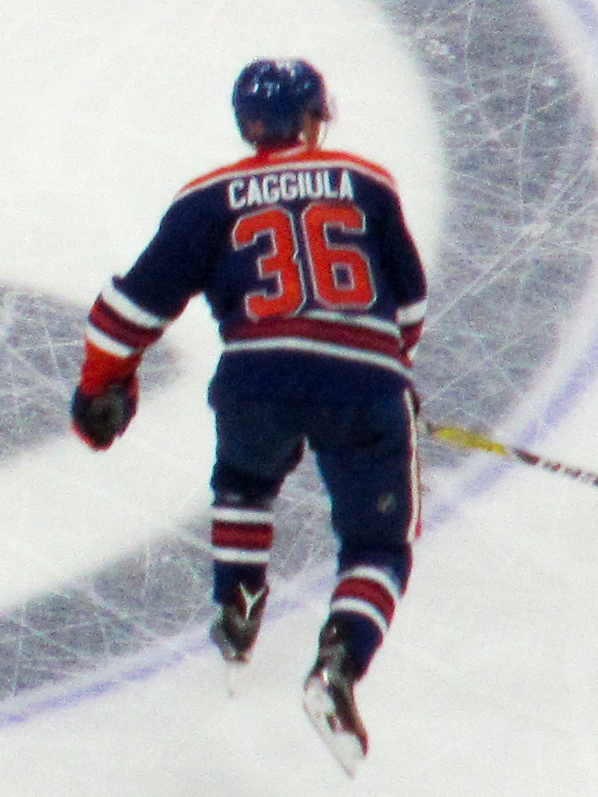
- Caggiula with the Edmonton Oilers in 2016
- Born: June 20, 1994 (age 32) Pickering, Ontario, Canada
- Height: 5 ft 10 in (178 cm)
- Weight: 179 lb (81 kg; 12 st 11 lb)
- Position: Left wing
- Shoots: Left
- NL team Former teams: Lausanne HC; Edmonton Oilers; Chicago Blackhawks; Arizona Coyotes; Buffalo Sabres; Pittsburgh Penguins
- NHL draft: Undrafted
- Playing career: 2016–present

Drake Caggiula (/kəˈdʒuːlə/; born June 20, 1994) is a Canadian professional ice hockey left wing currently playing for Lausanne HC in Switzerland's National League. He previously played in the National Hockey League for the Edmonton Oilers, Chicago Blackhawks, Arizona Coyotes, Buffalo Sabres and the Pittsburgh Penguins.

== Early life ==
Caggiula was born on June 20, 1994, in Pickering, Ontario, Canada to parents Sal and Terri Caggiula. His father coached and mentored him from the ages of eight to 15.

== Playing career ==
=== Junior ===
Growing up in Pickering, Caggiula played minor midget hockey with the Ajax/Pickering Raiders in 2009–10 before being drafted in the third round of the Ontario Hockey League (OHL) by the Erie Otters. At the time of the draft, Caggiula had finished the season with 95 points through 66 games. In order to maintain his NCAA eligibility, Caggiula chose to instead play with the Stouffville Spirit of the Ontario Junior Hockey League (OJHL). As a rookie in the OJHL, Caggiula was selected for the OJHL North-West Conference 1st Team All-Prospect after tallying 45 points in 48 games. Due to his success at the junior level, Caggiula was drafted by the Des Moines Buccaneers of the United States Hockey League. He attended the Buccaneers USHL Fall Classic event before returning to the Spirit for another season. During this time, Caggiula verbally accepted a full scholarship offer to play college hockey for the University of North Dakota of the NCAA.

Upon returning to the Spirit for a second season, Caggiula helped push them through a long playoff berth by tallying 17 goals and 37 points en route to their first-ever OJHL title. He was subsequently selected for the OJHL 1st Team All-Prospect for the second straight season and was named the most valuable player of the OJHL playoffs. During the season, Caggiula also participated in the inaugural Central Canada Cup Challenge championship against the Ligue de Hockey Junior AAA du Quebec All-Stars

=== Collegiate ===
Caggiula played for the Fighting Sioux at the University of North Dakota from 2012 to 2016 while majoring in kinesiology. Upon joining the team for his freshman season, Caggiula played as a left-winger alongside Rocco Grimaldi and Carter Rowney. In his freshman year at North Dakota, Caggiula played in 39 games and ranked second among the team's rookies in points, goals, and assists. The following season, Caggiula participated in the 2014 Frozen Four, where North Dakota lost 2–1 against Minnesota.

Prior to his junior year at North Dakota, Caggiula was invited and participated in the Buffalo Sabres 2014 Development camp. He began his junior season strong by averaging 1.44 points per game during November for 13 points through nine games. His point total led the conference and was tied for third nationally. At the conclusion of his junior year, Caggiula was named to the NCHC Second All-Star Team.

In his senior season with North Dakota in 2015–16, Caggiula led North Dakota to win the 2016 NCAA championship and was named Most Outstanding Player of the tournament. He was also named to the Second-Team All-American West and to the NCHC First All-Star Team. Following the end of the season, Caggiula gained attention from numerous NHL teams as the top available collegiate free agent. On May 7, 2016, Caggiula agreed to a two-year entry-level deal with the Edmonton Oilers.

=== Professional ===
Although Caggiula was expected to make his debut on October 12, it was delayed due to an injury. His debut eventually came on November 19 in a 5–2 win over the Dallas Stars. Caggiula scored his first NHL goal on December 3, 2016 in an Oilers overtime win over the Anaheim Ducks.

On June 14, 2018, Caggiula re-signed with the Oilers on a two-year contract. During the 2018–19 season, Caggiula suffered a hand injury during a game against the St. Louis Blues and was placed on injured reserve. At the time of the injury, Caggiula had recorded 10 points in 23 games.

On December 30, 2018, Caggiula was traded by the Oilers along with Jason Garrison to the Chicago Blackhawks in exchange for Brandon Manning and Robin Norell. On February 1, 2019, Caggiula scored his first goal as a Blackhawk in a 7–3 win against the Buffalo Sabres.

Despite hampered by injury in the 2019–20 season, Caggiula was a dependable role player with the Blackhawks, posting 9 goals and 15 points in 40 regular season games, before the season was effectively cut short due to the COVID-19 pandemic.

Due to salary cap constraints, Caggilua as an impending restricted free agent was not tendered a qualifying offer by Blackhawks, ending his two-year tenure and releasing him to free agency on October 8, 2020. On December 21, 2020, Caggiula was signed to a one-year, $700,000 contract with the Arizona Coyotes. In the pandemic delayed 2020–21 season, Caggiula appeared in 27 regular season contests, posting 1 goal and 7 points, before he was placed on waivers by Arizona on April 8, 2021, and was subsequently claimed by the Buffalo Sabres the following day.

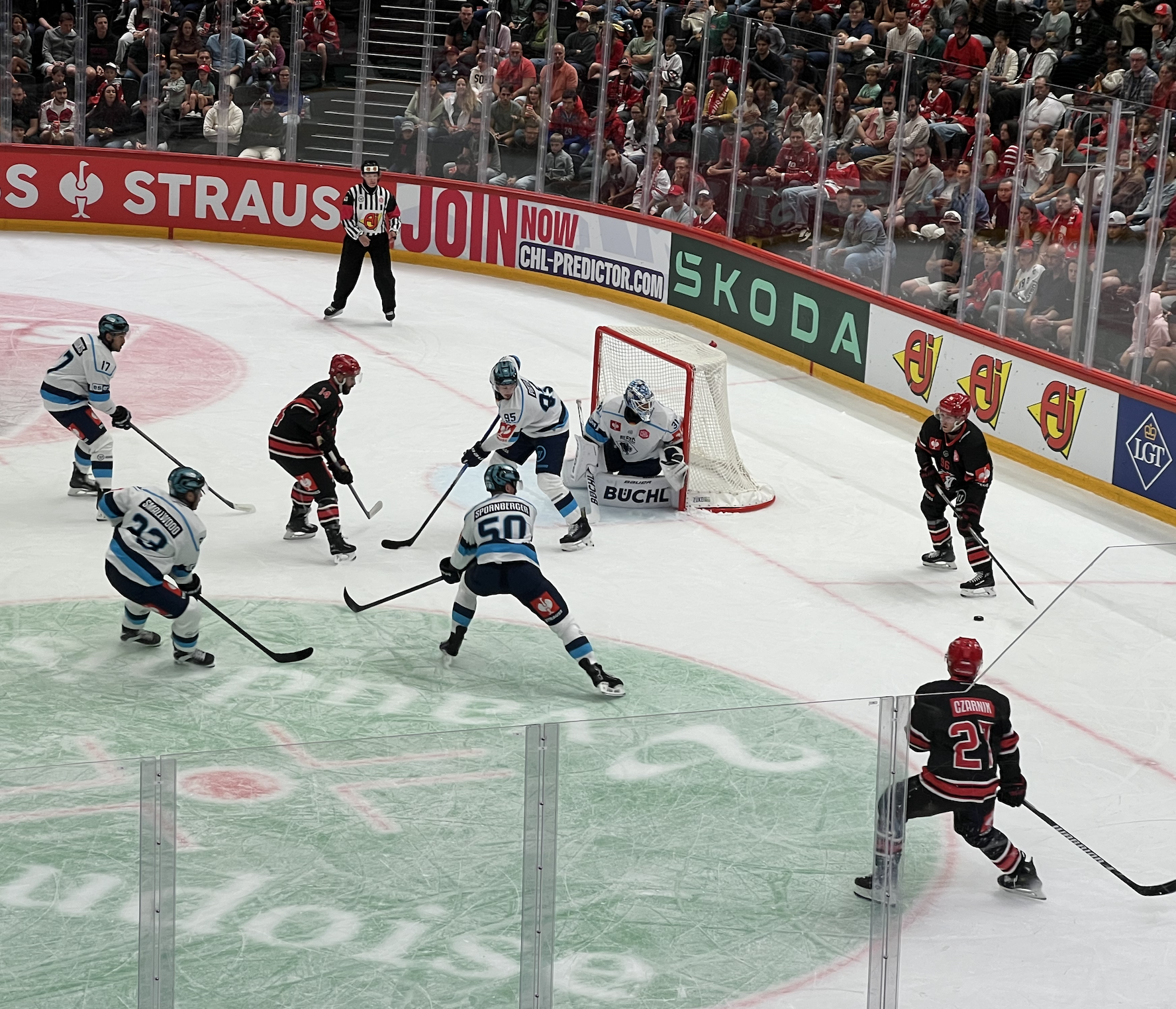
Caggiula (right, with the puck) with Lausanne HC against Ingolstadt in the Champions Hockey League in 2025.

On July 27, 2021, Caggiula signed a one-year, $750,000 extension with the Sabres.

As a free agent from the Sabres, on July 13, 2022, Caggiula signed to a one-year, two-way contract with the Pittsburgh Penguins.

After a single season within the Penguins organization, Caggiula left as a free agent and opted to return to his original club, the Edmonton Oilers, after securing a two-year, two-way contract on July 1, 2023.

=== Switzerland ===
On June 2, 2025, Caggiula signed a one-year contract to play for Lausanne HC in Switzerland's National League.

== Personal life ==
His older brother Brody previously played hockey and is a Level 4R Ontario Minor Hockey Association official.

== Career statistics ==
			Regular season					Playoffs
Season	Team	League	GP	G	A	Pts	PIM	GP	G	A	Pts	PIM
2010–11	Stouffville Spirit	OJHL	48	22	23	45	35	8	2	6	8	4
2011–12	Des Moines Buccaneers	USHL	4	1	1	2	8	—	—	—	—	—
2011–12	Stouffville Spirit	OJHL	25	10	24	34	36	23	17	20	37	38
2012–13	University of North Dakota	WCHA	39	8	8	16	31	—	—	—	—	—
2013–14	University of North Dakota	NCHC	42	11	13	24	52	—	—	—	—	—
2014–15	University of North Dakota	NCHC	42	18	18	36	30	—	—	—	—	—
2015–16	University of North Dakota	NCHC	39	25	26	51	60	—	—	—	—	—
2016–17	Edmonton Oilers	NHL	60	7	11	18	16	13	3	0	3	25
2017–18	Edmonton Oilers	NHL	67	13	7	20	37	—	—	—	—	—
2018–19	Edmonton Oilers	NHL	29	7	4	11	16	—	—	—	—	—
2018–19	Chicago Blackhawks	NHL	26	5	7	12	12	—	—	—	—	—
2019–20	Chicago Blackhawks	NHL	40	9	6	15	32	8	1	2	3	2
2020–21	Arizona Coyotes	NHL	27	1	6	7	15	—	—	—	—	—
2020–21	Buffalo Sabres	NHL	11	2	1	3	4	—	—	—	—	—
2021–22	Buffalo Sabres	NHL	18	2	3	5	4	—	—	—	—	—
2022–23	Wilkes-Barre/Scranton Penguins	AHL	65	22	31	53	47	—	—	—	—	—
2022–23	Pittsburgh Penguins	NHL	4	0	0	0	0	—	—	—	—	—
2023–24	Bakersfield Condors	AHL	43	13	24	37	31	—	—	—	—	—
2024–25	Bakersfield Condors	AHL	62	24	28	52	67	—	—	—	—	—
2024–25	Edmonton Oilers	NHL	7	0	1	1	5	—	—	—	—	—
NHL totals			289	46	46	92	141	21	4	2	6	27

== Awards and honors ==
Award	Year
OJHL
First Team All-Prospect	2011–12
Playoff MVP	2011–12
College
NCHC Second All-Star Team	2014–15
NCHC First All-Star Team	2015–16
Second-Team All-American West	2015-16
NCAA All-Tournament Team	2016
NCAA Tournament Most Outstanding Player	2016

Awards and achievements
Preceded by Jon Gillies	NCAA Tournament Most Outstanding Player; 2016	Succeeded by Jarid Lukosevicius
