= Noel Acciari =

American ice hockey player (born 1991)

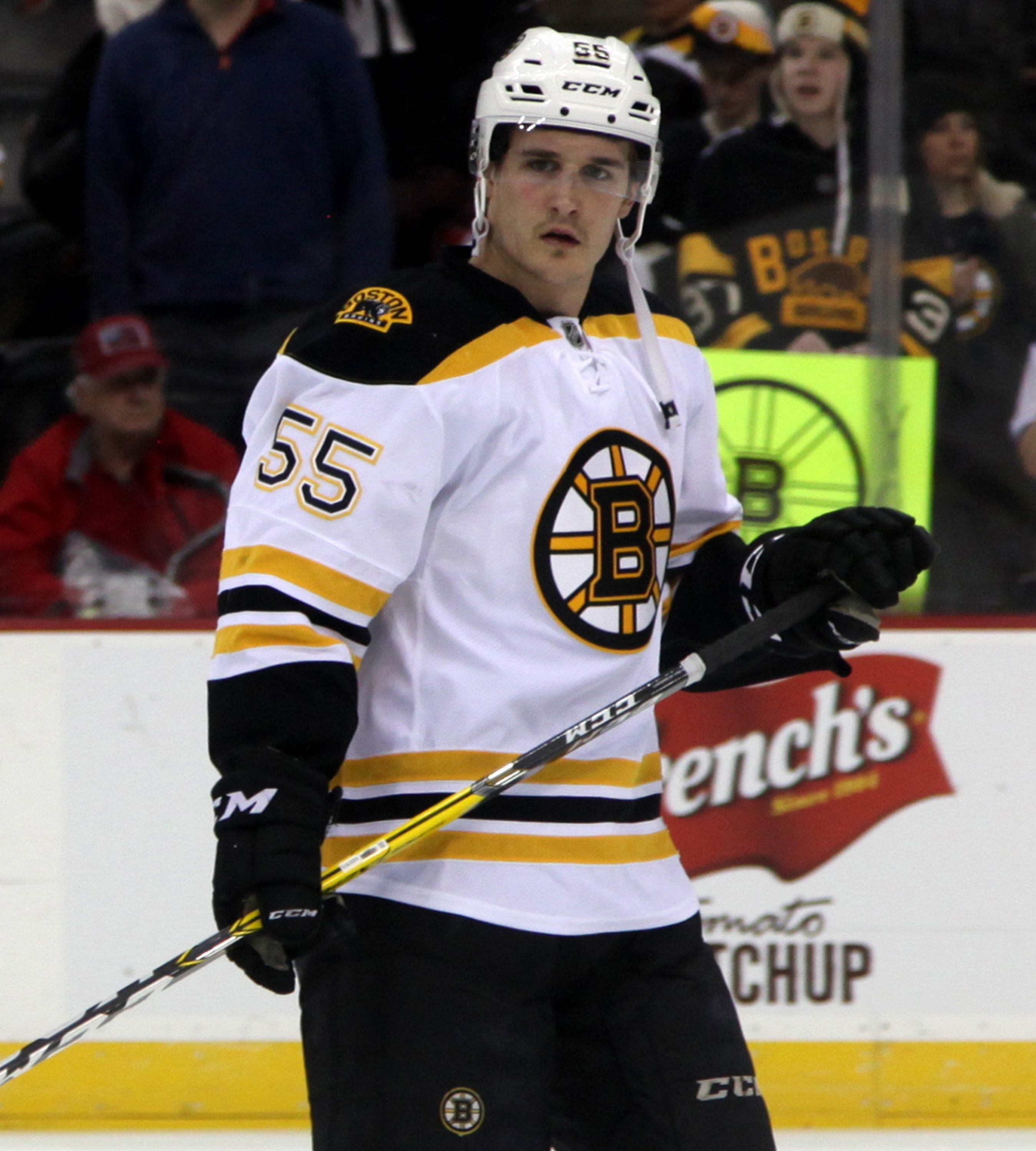
- Acciari with the Boston Bruins in 2016
- Born: December 1, 1991 (age 34) Johnston, Rhode Island, U.S.
- Height: 5 ft 11 in (180 cm)
- Weight: 204 lb (93 kg; 14 st 8 lb)
- Position: Center
- Shoots: Right
- NHL team Former teams: Philadelphia Flyers; Boston Bruins; Florida Panthers; St. Louis Blues; Toronto Maple Leafs; Pittsburgh Penguins
- NHL draft: Undrafted
- Playing career: 2015–present

Noel Acciari (born December 1, 1991) is an American professional ice hockey player who is a center for the Philadelphia Flyers of the National Hockey League (NHL). He has previously played for the Boston Bruins, Florida Panthers, St. Louis Blues, Toronto Maple Leafs, and Pittsburgh Penguins. As an amateur he attended Providence College and played NCAA Division I hockey with their team, the Providence Friars. In 2015 he helped the Friars win their first ever NCAA National Championship.

== Playing career ==
=== Amateur ===
As a youth, Acciari played in the 2004 Quebec International Pee-Wee Hockey Tournament with a minor ice hockey team from South Shore. Acciari attended Bishop Hendricken High School in Warwick, Rhode Island, where he won the state championship in his freshman year in 2007 and was named team captain in 2009.

He then joined the Kent School team in Kent, Connecticut, and played for them for two years before enrolling at Providence College in his senior year to play NCAA Division I hockey with the Providence Friars. He was named the team's co-captain. That season, Acciari helped his team capture the 2015 NCAA National Championship, the school's first ever championship, and his outstanding play was recognized when he was named Hockey East's Best Defensive Forward. He played three seasons with Providence, registering 32 goals, 33 assists, 65 points in 113 games.

=== Professional ===
==== Boston Bruins ====
An undrafted free agent, on June 8, 2015, the Boston Bruins of the National Hockey League (NHL) signed Acciari to a two-year entry-level contract. He was assigned to Boston's American Hockey League (AHL) affiliate, the Providence Bruins, to begin the 2015–16 season. He played in 45 games in the AHL, scoring seven goals and 19 points. In the midst of the 2015–16 NHL season, on March 1, 2016, Acciari was called up to Boston for the first time. He made his NHL debut that night in a home game against the Calgary Flames. He registered his first NHL point on March 7, assisting on Brett Connolly's first period goal in a 5–4 victory over the Florida Panthers. He established himself on Boston's fourth line, playing with Landon Ferraro and Brett Connolly. He played in 19 games with Boston, registering just the one point. He was returned to Providence at the end of Boston's season and after Providence made the 2016 Calder Cup playoffs. Acciari appeared in three playoff games for Providence, scoring one goal and three points as they were eliminated by the Wilkes-Barre/Scranton Penguins in the opening round.

The following season in 2016–17, Acciari made the NHL Bruins out of training camp. He appeared in 12 games for Boston, registering two points before suffering a lower-body injury on November 7. Upon returning from injury he was assigned to Providence on December 7. He was recalled on December 10, but was returned to Providence on January 6, 2017, after playing in another seven games with Boston. He was recalled again in March on an emergency basis, but this was later changed to a full recall on March 20. It would not be until March 28, that Acciari would score his first NHL goal against goaltender Pekka Rinne in a home game against the Nashville Predators; Acciari scored the third Bruins goal en route to a 4–1 regulation-time Bruins win. In 30 games with Providence, he scored six goals and 14 points and with the Bruins during the regular season, he added two goals and five points in 29 games. Boston made the 2017 Stanley Cup playoffs, but Acciari missed the first couple of playoff games due to an injury suffered in the last week of the regular season. He returned for Game 3 of the first-round series versus the Ottawa Senators. He made his NHL playoff debut on April 17 in a 4–3 overtime loss to the Senators, but scored his first playoff goal against Craig Anderson in the second period. He appeared in four games with the one goal as the Bruins were eliminated by the Senators. On June 28, Acciari signed a two-year contract extension with Boston.

He began the 2017–18 season with Boston and broke his finger in the season opener against the Nashville Predators in October, requiring surgery. He returned to the lineup on November 10 and helped solidify the fourth line with Sean Kuraly and Tim Schaller. He played the entire season in Boston for the first time, appearing in 60 games, scoring ten goals and 11 points. The Bruins made the 2018 Stanley Cup playoffs and Acciari registered a multi-point game on April 21 in Game 5 of the first round series against the Toronto Maple Leafs. He assisted on Kuraly's second period goal, before adding his own in the third period in a 5–4 loss. He appeared in 12 playoff games, scoring the one goal and two points as the Bruins were eliminated by the Tampa Bay Lightning in the second round. Following the loss to the Lightning, Acciari underwent surgery in the off-season for a sports hernia that he had been playing with. In the 2018–19 season, Acciari appeared in 72 games with Boston, scoring six goals and 14 points. The Bruins made the 2019 Stanley Cup playoffs and the team went on a deep run, making it to the 2019 Stanley Cup Finals against the St. Louis Blues. Acciari scored two goals and four points in 19 playoff games as the Bruins were defeated by the Blues in the final. In the playoffs, Acciari played through a broken sternum and injured foot and hand.

==== Florida Panthers ====
As an unrestricted free agent, Acciari signed a three-year, $5 million contract with the Florida Panthers on July 1, 2019. Following the signing, Panthers General Manager Dale Tallon praised Acciari's versatile play and physicality, saying: "This guy's going to make people accountable, and make our own players accountable as well. He's a versatile player. He will take some of the burden away from others by taking D-zone faceoffs, killing penalties and playing that physical role. He gives our fourth line a little more spirit and passion." He made his Panthers debut in the season opening loss to the Tampa Bay Lightning on October 3. In the next game on October 5, also against the Lightning, he scored his first goal with Florida on Andrei Vasilevskiy in a 4–3 victory. On December 16, he marked his first hat trick, scoring three goals on Anders Nilsson in a 6–1 win over the Ottawa Senators. In the following game on December 20, he scored another hat trick in a 7–4 win over the Dallas Stars. Playing on a line with Jonathan Huberdeau and Vincent Trocheck, he scored the first two goals on Ben Bishop who was pulled by the Stars and replaced with Anton Khudobin. While on the penalty kill, Acciari got the puck and was hooked by Stars defenseman John Klingberg. Acciari was awarded the first penalty shot of his career and he completed the hat trick, scoring on the play on Khudobin. This marked only the second time in franchise history other than Pavel Bure in 2001, for a Panthers player to mark hat tricks in consecutive games. He registered a fourth point in the game, assisting on Trocheck's second period goal. On February 11, 2020, Acciari recorded a three-point game, scoring one goal and assisting on two others in a 5–3 victory over the New Jersey Devils. Due to injuries, he centered a line with two defensemen, Mike Matheson and Mark Pysyk, and the line combined for eight points in the game. In the 2019–20 season, he tallied a career-best 20 goals and 27 points through 66 games before the NHL suspended the season due to the COVID-19 pandemic on March 12, 2020. Since the Panthers were in a playoff position when the season suspended, they were among the teams selected to play in the qualifying round of the 2020 Stanley Cup playoffs, played in August 2020. Acciari appeared in four playoff games with the Panthers, going scoreless, which were eliminated by the New York Islanders in the opening qualifying round.

In the pandemic-shortened 2020–21 season, Acciari made 41 appearances for Florida, scoring four goals and 11 points. On March 6, 2021, he registered his third hat trick against Pekka Rinne in a 6–2 victory over the Nashville Predators. The Panthers made the 2021 Stanley Cup playoffs and he appeared in six games, going scoreless, as the team was eliminated in the first round by the Tampa Bay Lightning. He began the 2021–22 season on injured reserve after suffering a pectoral injury in a preseason exhibition game against the Lightning on October 5. The injury required surgery and after recovering, he was assigned to the Panthers' AHL affiliate Charlotte Checkers for a two-game conditioning stint. He was recalled on February 5, 2022, and his season debut on February 18 in a 6–2 victory over the Minnesota Wild. He played in 20 games with the Panthers, scoring three goals and eight points as the team won the Presidents' Trophy for the first time in franchise history as the best squad in the league. In the 2022 Stanley Cup playoffs, he played in nine games, going scoreless, as the Panthers were upset in the second round by the Tampa Bay Lightning.

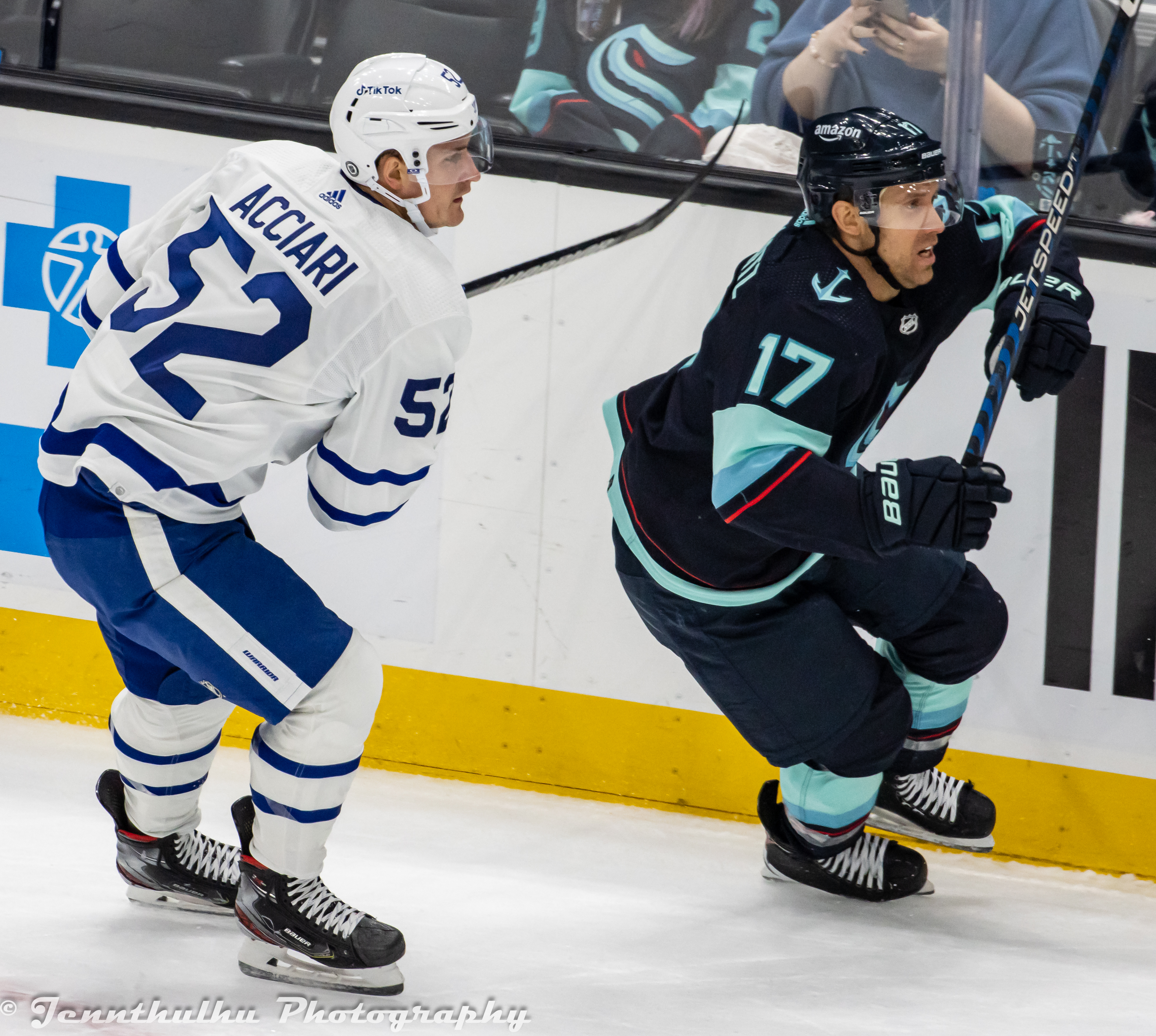
Acciari (left) and Jaden Schwartz of the Seattle Kraken during a game in 2023

==== St. Louis Blues and Toronto Maple Leafs ====
Following the conclusion of his contract with the Panthers, Acciari left as a free agent to sign a one-year, $1.25 million contract with the St. Louis Blues on July 13, 2022. He made his Blues debut in the season opening victory over the Columbus Blue Jackets on October 15. He scored his first goal for St. Louis on October 29 against Jake Allen in a 7–4 loss to the Montreal Canadiens. He skated in 54 games for the Blues during the 2022–23 season, recording 10 goals and eight assists.

However, the Blues were having a bad season and chose to rebuild their team. On February 17, 2023, Acciari and forward Ryan O'Reilly were traded by the Blues to the Toronto Maple Leafs in a three-team trade also involving the Minnesota Wild. The Maple Leafs acquired Acciari in order to strengthen their bottom six forwards. He made his Maple Leafs debut on February 18 in a 5–1 win over the Montreal Canadiens. He scored his first goal with Toronto in the next game on February 19 against Jaxson Stauber in a 5–3 loss to the Chicago Blackhawks. Acciari finished with four goals and five points in 23 games with the Maple Leafs during the regular season and was one of Toronto's key penalty killers after arriving. He scored the game-winning goal in a 3–2 win over the New York Rangers in the Maple Leafs's final game of the season on April 13. During the first round of the 2023 Stanley Cup playoffs, Acciari broke his own 25-playoff game goalless drought when he scored the opening goal in Toronto's 4–3 win over the Tampa Bay Lightning. The Maple Leafs eliminated the Lightning, but were defeated themselves by the Florida Panthers in the second round. He appeared in 11 playoff games for Toronto, registering two goals.

==== Pittsburgh Penguins ====
As an unrestricted free agent from the Maple Leafs, Acciari signed a three-year, $6 million contract with the Pittsburgh Penguins on July 1, 2023. He made his Penguins debut in the 2023–24 season opening 4–2 loss to the Chicago Blackhawks on October 10. He registered his first point for Pittsburgh on November 4 assisting on Matt Nieto's first goal of the season in a 10–2 drubbing of the San Jose Sharks. He scored his first goal for the team against Adin Hill in a 3–0 victory over the Vegas Golden Knights. On February 8, 2024, in a 3–0 victory over the Winnipeg Jets, he was struck in the head by Jets defenseman Brenden Dillon and suffered a concussion. Dillon was suspended for three games for the hit. Acciari returned to the lineup on February 22 after missing six games due to the effects of the concussion. He made 55 appearances for Pittsburgh, scoring four goals and seven points as the Penguins missed the playoffs.

==== Philadelphia Flyers ====
On July 1, 2026, the Philadelphia Flyers signed Acciari as a free agent to a two-year, $5.6 million deal.

== Personal life ==
Acciari was born to parents Michael and Edna Acciari and grew up the middle child of three brothers. Acciari married Kaitlyn Chisholm on July 14, 2018, in Rhode Island. The couple have four children.

== Career statistics ==
			Regular season					Playoffs
Season	Team	League	GP	G	A	Pts	PIM	GP	G	A	Pts	PIM
2007–08	Bishop Hendricken High School	HS-RI
2008–09	Bishop Hendricken High School	HS-RI
2009–10	Kent School	HS-Prep	26	18	20	38	10	—	—	—	—	—
2010–11	Kent School	HS-Prep	27	31	21	52	22	—	—	—	—	—
2012–13	Providence College	HE	33	6	5	11	26	—	—	—	—	—
2013–14	Providence College	HE	39	11	11	22	20	—	—	—	—	—
2014–15	Providence College	HE	41	15	17	32	26	—	—	—	—	—
2015–16	Providence Bruins	AHL	45	7	12	19	19	3	1	2	3	4
2015–16	Boston Bruins	NHL	19	0	1	1	8	—	—	—	—	—
2016–17	Boston Bruins	NHL	29	2	3	5	16	4	1	0	1	2
2016–17	Providence Bruins	AHL	30	6	8	14	11	—	—	—	—	—
2017–18	Boston Bruins	NHL	60	10	1	11	9	12	1	1	2	2
2018–19	Boston Bruins	NHL	72	6	8	14	47	19	2	2	4	0
2019–20	Florida Panthers	NHL	66	20	7	27	21	4	0	0	0	0
2020–21	Florida Panthers	NHL	41	4	7	11	9	6	0	0	0	0
2021–22	Florida Panthers	NHL	20	3	5	8	11	9	0	0	0	0
2021–22	Charlotte Checkers	AHL	2	0	0	0	0	—	—	—	—	—
2022–23	St. Louis Blues	NHL	54	10	8	18	10	—	—	—	—	—
2022–23	Toronto Maple Leafs	NHL	23	4	1	5	11	11	2	0	2	2
2023–24	Pittsburgh Penguins	NHL	55	4	3	7	10	—	—	—	—	—
2024–25	Pittsburgh Penguins	NHL	79	5	7	12	16	—	—	—	—	—
2025–26	Pittsburgh Penguins	NHL	67	13	12	25	25	6	0	1	1	12
NHL totals			585	81	63	144	193	71	6	4	10	16

== Awards and honors ==
Award	Year
College
HE Defensive Forward of the Year	2014–15

Awards and achievements
Preceded by Bill Arnold; Ross Mauermann	Hockey East Best Defensive Forward; 2014–15	Succeeded by Sam Herr
