= 2014 ECAC Hockey men's ice hockey tournament =

2014 ECAC Men's ice hockey tournament
- 2014 ECAC Hockey Men's Ice Hockey Tournament logo
- Dates: March 7–22, 2014
- Teams: 12
- Finals site: Herb Brooks Arena; Lake Placid, New York
- Champions: Union (3rd title)
- Winning coach: Rick Bennett (3rd title)
- MVP: Daniel Carr (Union)
- ECAC Men's Ice Hockey Tournaments

The 2014 ECAC Hockey Men's Ice Hockey Tournament was the 53rd tournament in league history. It was played between March 7 and March 22, 2014. First Round and Quarterfinal games were played at home team campus sites, while the final four games were played at the Herb Brooks Arena in Lake Placid, New York. By winning the tournament, Union received the ECAC's automatic bid to the 2014 NCAA Division I Men's Ice Hockey Tournament.

== Format ==
The tournament featured four rounds of play. The teams that finish above fifth place in the standings receive a bye to the quarterfinal round. In the first round, the fifth and twelfth seeds, the sixth and eleventh seeds, the seventh and tenth seeds and the eighth and ninth seeds played a best-of-three series with the winners advancing to the quarterfinals. In the quarterfinals the one seed plays the lowest remaining seed, the second seed plays the second-lowest remaining seed, the third seed plays the third-lowest remaining seed and the fourth seed plays the fourth-lowest remaining seed another best-of-three series with the winners of these the series advancing to the Semifinals. In the semifinals the top remaining seed plays the lowest remaining seed while the two remaining teams play against each other. The winners of the semifinals play in the championship game while the losers play in a third-place game. All series after the quarterfinals are single-elimination games. The tournament champion receives an automatic bid to the 2014 NCAA Division I Men's Ice Hockey Tournament.

The third place game was eliminated from the tournament starting in 2014.

== Conference standings ==
Note: GP = Games played; W = Wins; L = Losses; T = Ties; PTS = Points; GF = Goals For; GA = Goals Against

2013–14 ECAC Hockey men's standings
	Conference record							Overall record					
	GP	W	L	T	PTS	GF	GA	GP	W	L	T	GF	GA
#1 Union^{†}*	22	18	3	1	37	83	42	42	32	6	4	160	90
#12 Colgate	22	13	6	3	29	72	59	39	20	14	5	108	104
#7 Quinnipiac	22	12	6	4	28	78	43	40	24	10	6	141	81
#16 Cornell	22	11	7	4	26	51	50	32	17	10	5	77	74
Clarkson	22	11	9	2	24	57	64	42	21	17	4	101	102
Yale	22	10	8	4	24	71	56	33	17	11	5	106	82
Rensselaer	22	8	9	5	21	57	57	37	15	16	6	104	100
St. Lawrence	22	7	11	4	18	70	78	38	15	19	4	122	131
Brown	22	8	13	1	17	48	62	31	11	17	3	75	87
Dartmouth	22	7	13	2	16	51	72	34	10	20	4	84	115
Harvard	22	6	12	4	16	44	52	31	10	17	4	69	83
Princeton	22	4	18	0	8	44	91	32	6	26	0	60	126
Championship: Union † indicates conference regular season champion (Cleary Cup) * indicates conference tournament champion (Whitelaw Cup); Rankings: USCHO.com Top 20 Poll; updated March 23, 2014

== Bracket ==
Teams are reseeded after the First Round and Quarterfinals

First Round; March 7–9
5	Clarkson	2	4	3
12	Princeton	3*	0	2
6	Yale	4	2	–
11	Harvard	0	1	–
7	Rensselaer	4	2	4
10	Dartmouth	1	3	5
8	St. Lawrence	3**	3	–
9	Brown	2	2	–

Quarterfinals; March 14–16
1	Union	3	4	–
10	Dartmouth	0	2	–
2	Colgate	2	4	–
8	St. Lawrence	1	3	–
3	Quinnipiac	6	5	–
6	Yale	2	3	–
4	Cornell	2	1	1*
5	Clarkson	1	4	0

Semifinals; March 21
1	Union	5
4	Cornell	2
2	Colgate	3**
3	Quinnipiac	2

Championship; March 22
1	Union	5
2	Colgate	2

Note: * denotes overtime period(s)

=== First round ===
==== (5) Clarkson vs. (12) Princeton ====
March 7	Clarkson	2 – 3	OT	Princeton	Cheel Arena	Recap
No scoring		First period		04:19 - Kyle Rankin (Liau, Foster)
(Sexton, McPherson) Will Frederick - PP - 03:34 (Boak, Zarbo) Pat Megannety - 19:51		Second period		No scoring
No scoring		Third period		06:15 - PP - Andrew Calof (Ambrosia, Rush)
No scoring		First overtime period		12:02 - GW - Andrew Ammon (Calof, Liau)
( 26 saves / 29 shots ) Greg Lewis		Goalie stats		Colton Phinney ( 39 saves / 41 shots )

March 8	Clarkson	4 – 0	Princeton	Cheel Arena	Recap
(McPherson, Powers) Jeff DiNallo - GW - 00:54 (Sexton, McPherson) Will Frederick - PP - 10:20		First period	No scoring
(Zarbo, Sinz) James de Haas - 04:22 (Sexton) James de Haas - 10:31		Second period	No scoring
No scoring		Third period	No scoring
( 24 saves / 24 shots ) Steve Perry		Goalie stats	Sean Bonar ( 33 saves / 37 shots )

March 9	Clarkson	3 – 2	Princeton	Cheel Arena	Recap
(Zarbo) Jarrett Burton - PP - 02:13 (Geiger, DiNallo) Allan McPherson - 12:29		First period	06:52 - Jonathan Liau (Brockett, Foster)
(DiNallo) Will Frederick - GW PP - 12:49		Second period	10:00 - PP - Kyle Rankin (Ambrosia, Calof)
No scoring		Third period	No scoring
( 21 saves / 23 shots ) Steve Perry		Goalie stats	Colton Phinney ( 32 saves / 35 shots )

Clarkson won series 2–1

==== (6) Yale vs. (11) Harvard ====
March 7	Yale	4 – 0	Harvard	Ingalls Rink	Recap
(Agostino, Killian) Jesse Root - GW - 07:47 (Learned, Ruffolo) Gus Young - 09:56		First period	No scoring
(Obuchowski, Lyon) Cody Learned - SH - 05:44		Second period	No scoring
(Ruffolo, O'Gara) Carson Cooper - 16:31		Third period	No scoring
( 24 saves / 24 shots ) Alex Lyon		Goalie stats	Steve Michalek ( 11 saves / 14 shots ) / Raphael Girard ( 13 saves / 14 shots )

March 8	Yale	2 – 1	Harvard	Ingalls Rink	Recap
No scoring		First period	16:42 - PP - Brian Hart (Malone, Newell)
No scoring		Second period	No scoring
(Day, Root) Stu Wilson - EA - 10:31 (Root, Hayden) Kenny Agostino - GW PP - 11:09		Third period	No scoring
( 18 saves / 19 shots ) Alex Lyon		Goalie stats	Raphael Girard ( 37 saves / 39 shots )

Yale won series 2–0

==== (7) Rensselaer vs. (10) Dartmouth ====
March 7	Rensselaer	4 – 1	Dartmouth	Houston Field House	Recap
(Neal, Zalewski) Ryan Haggerty - PP - 04:39 (unassisted) Ryan Haggerty - GW - 10:01		First period	No scoring
(Bubela, Neal) Jacob Laliberte - 02:29		Second period	08:53 - PP - Jesse Beamish (Simpson, Hartley)
(Miller) Zach Schroeder - 01:06		Third period	No scoring
( 29 saves / 30 shots ) Scott Diebold		Goalie stats	Charles Grant ( 33 saves / 37 shots )

March 8	Rensselaer	2 – 3	Dartmouth	Houston Field House	Recap
No scoring		First period	07:13 - PP - Eric Neiley (Opperman, Sikura)
(Neal) Jacob Laliberte - 08:43 (Neal, Zalewski) Ryan Haggerty - PP - 11:55		Second period	09:51 - Jesse Beamish (unassisted)
No scoring		Third period	13:46 - GW - Eric Neiley (Opperman, Hartley)
( 36 saves / 39 shots ) Scott Diebold		Goalie stats	Charles Grant ( 20 saves / 22 shots )

March 9	Rensselaer	4 – 5	Dartmouth	Houston Field House	Recap
(Higgs, Zalewski) Ryan Haggerty - 03:39 (Haggerty) Mike Zalewski - 16:00		First period	06:38 - SH - Tim O'Brien (unassisted)
(McGowan, Leonard) Chris Bradley - 15:43 (Schroeder) Mark McGowan - 18:50		Second period	18:05 - Rick Pinkston (McNally, Neiley)
No scoring		Third period	02:10 - Eric Neiley (McNally, Opperman); 08:48 - Brandon McNally (Neiley); 17:46 - GW - Brad Schierhorn (O'Brien)
( 34 saves / 39 shots ) Scott Diebold		Goalie stats	Charles Grant ( 35 saves / 39 shots )

Dartmouth won series 2–1

==== (8) St. Lawrence vs. (9) Brown ====
March 7	St. Lawrence	3 – 2	2OT	Brown	Appleton Arena	Recap
No scoring		First period		No scoring
(Ward, Dahl) Kyle Essery - 04:42 (Bayreuther, Carey) Greg Carey - PP - 18:46		Second period		14:00 - Zach Pryzbek (Hathaway, Lamacchia)
No scoring		Third period		19:05 - EA - Nick Lappin (Hathaway, Naclerio)
(Wick, Raley) Eric Sweetman - GW - 01:27		Second overtime period		No scoring
( 26 saves / 28 shots ) Matt Weninger		Goalie stats		Tyler Steel ( 43 saves / 46 shots )

March 8	St. Lawrence	3 – 2	Brown	Appleton Arena	Recap
No scoring		First period	No scoring
(Dahl, Carey) Eric Sweetman - PP - 05:13		Second period	No scoring
(Essery, Hughes) Gavin Bayreuther - 04:36 (Hagen, Ward) Woody Hudson - GW - 05:52		Third period	04:10 - Garnet Hathaway (Pryzbek); 10:10 - Ryan Jacobson (Middleton, Doane)
( 23 saves / 25 shots ) Matt Weninger		Goalie stats	Tyler Steel ( 25 saves / 28 shots )

St. Lawrence won series 2–0

=== Quarterfinals ===
==== (1) Union vs. (10) Dartmouth ====
March 14	Union	3 – 0	Dartmouth	Achilles Center	Recap
No scoring		First period	No scoring
(Vecchione, Gostisbehere) Michael Pontarelli - GW PP - 01:12		Second period	No scoring
(unassisted) Daniel Carr - PS - 17:23 (Gostisbehere, Vecchione) Daniel Carr - EN - 18:34		Third period	No scoring
( 32 saves / 32 shots ) Colin Stevens		Goalie stats	Charles Grant ( 39 saves / 41 shots )

March 15	Union	4 – 2	Dartmouth	Achilles Center	Recap
(Ciampini, Carr) Mike Vecchione - 04:34		First period	11:38 - PP - Brandon McNally (Opperman, Neiley); 13:01 - PP - Tim O'Brien (Beamish, Mosey)
(Vecchione) Daniel Carr - 18:45		Second period	No scoring
(Taylor, Sullivan) Max Novak - GW - 09:09 (Vecchione) Daniel Ciampini - EN - 19:08		Third period	No scoring
( 33 saves / 35 shots ) Colin Stevens		Goalie stats	Charles Grant ( 27 saves / 30 shots )

Union won series 2–0

==== (2) Colgate vs. (8) St. Lawrence ====
March 14	Colgate	2 – 1	St. Lawrence	Starr Rink	Recap
(Spink, Borkowski) Tyson Spink - PP - 02:29 (Spink, Spink) Kevin Lough - GW PP - 05:09		First period	No scoring
No scoring		Second period	No scoring
No scoring		Third period	14:20 - Justin Baker (Carey, Raley)
( 22 saves / 23 shots ) Charlie Finn		Goalie stats	Matt Weninger ( 29 saves / 31 shots )

March 15	Colgate	4 – 3	St. Lawrence	Starr Rink	Recap
(Borowski, Gentzler) Darcy Murphy - 02:22		First period	01:40 - Woody Hudson (Ward, Smolcynski); 15:13 - PP - Greg Carey (Bayreuther, Wick)
(Wilson, Black) Darcy Murphy - PP - 08:43		Second period	No scoring
(Johnston, Black) Joe Wilson - 05:00 (Wilson, Johnston) Darcy Murphy - GW PP - 09:25		Third period	16:46 - Greg Carey (Wick, Carey)
( 23 saves / 26 shots ) Charlie Finn		Goalie stats	Matt Weninger ( 20 saves / 24 shots )

Colgate won series 2–0

==== (3) Quinnipiac vs. (6) Yale ====
March 14	Quinnipiac	6 – 2	Yale	TD Bank Sports Center	Recap
(Sherbinin) Tim Clifton - 05:10		First period	No scoring
(Tolkinen, Peca) Travis St. Denis - 04:00 (Toews) Connor Jones - GW - 05:17 (Tolkinen, Jones) Bryce Van Brabant - PP - 10:33		Second period	16:39 - PP - Ryan Obuchowski (Root, Fallen)
(Samuels-Thomas) Travis St. Denis - 07:32 (Schutt) Connor Clifton - 10:24		Third period	02:19 - PP - John Hayden (Wilson, Obuchowski)
( 17 saves / 19 shots ) Michael Garteig		Goalie stats	Alex Lyon ( 29 saves / 33 shots ) / Patrick Spano ( 5 saves / 7 shots )

March 15	Quinnipiac	5 – 3	Yale	TD Bank Sports Center	Recap
(Jones, Jones) Sam Anas - 03:00 (Tolkinen, Peca) Travis St. Denis - 05:31 (Scherbinin, Peca) Tommy Schutt - 17:11		First period	14:31 - PP - John Hayden (Agostino, Root)
No scoring		Second period	02:56 - Mike Doherty (Witek); 12:27 - John Hayden (Root, Agostino)
(Van Brabant, Smith) Jordan Samuels-Thomas -GW PP - 04:40 (Jones) Sam Anas - 08:40		Third period	No scoring
( 23 saves / 26 shots ) Michael Garteig		Goalie stats	Alex Lyon ( 29 saves / 34 shots )

Quinnipiac won series 2–0

==== (4) Cornell vs. (5) Clarkson ====
March 14	Cornell	2 – 1	Clarkson	Lynah Rink	Recap
(Lowry, McCarron) Kirill Gotovets - 11:33		First period	No scoring
(McCarron, Ferlin) Kirill Gotovets - GW PP - 02:31		Second period	14:49 - PS - Jordan Boucher (unassisted)
No scoring		Third period	No scoring
( 28 saves / 29 shots ) Andy Iles		Goalie stats	Steve Perry ( 31 saves / 33 shots )

March 15	Cornell	1 – 4	Clarkson	Lynah Rink	Recap
No scoring		First period	07:00 - PP - Jeff DiNallo (McPherson, Sexton)
(Bardreau, Ferlin) Patrick McCarron - 11:09		Second period	05:52 - GW - Christian Powers (Geiger, McPherson); 07:33 - PP - James de Haas (DiNallo, Sexton)
No scoring		Third period	19:52 - EN - Jarrett Burton (Frederick)
( 11 saves / 14 shots ) Andy Iles		Goalie stats	Steve Perry ( 23 saves / 24 shots )

March 16	Cornell	1 – 0	OT	Clarkson	Lynah Rink	Recap
No scoring		First period		No scoring
No scoring		Second period		No scoring
No scoring		Third period		No scoring
(Lewis, Ryan) Brian Ferlin - GW - 12:32		First overtime period		No scoring
( 23 saves / 23 shots ) Andy Iles		Goalie stats		Steve Perry ( 25 saves / 26 shots )

Cornell won series 2–1

=== Semifinals ===
==== (1) Union vs. (4) Cornell ====
March 21	Union	5 – 2	Cornell	Herb Brooks Arena	Recap
(Pontarelli, Coatta) Cole Ikkala - 09:24 (Wilkins, Bodie) Kevin Sullivan - PP - 17:47		First period	No scoring
(Hatch, Sullivan) Max Novak - GW - 17:20 (Carr, Bodie) Mike Vecchione - 18:32		Second period	05:56 - Christian Hilbrich (unassisted); 18:18 - Joakim Ryan (Willcox, Knisley)
(unassisted) Daniel Carr - EN - 18:37		Third period	No scoring
( 24 saves / 26 shots ) Colin Stevens		Goalie stats	Andy Iles ( 26 saves / 30 shots )

==== (2) Colgate vs. (3) Quinnipiac ====
March 21	Colgate	3 – 2	2OT	Quinnipiac	Herb Brooks Arena	Recap
No scoring		First period		No scoring
(unassisted) Andrew Black - 19:18		Second period		02:54 - Connor Jones (Jones); 15:37 - PP - Sam Anas (Peca, Toews)
(Spink) Kyle Baun - EA - 19:04		Third period		No scoring
(Baun, Kulevich) Tyson Spink - GW - 00:58		Second overtime period		No scoring
( 30 saves / 32 shots ) Charlie Finn		Goalie stats		Michael Garteig ( 33 saves / 36 shots )

=== Championship ===
==== (1) Union vs. (2) Colgate ====
March 22	Union	5 – 2	Colgate	Herb Brooks Arena	Recap
No scoring		First period	No scoring
(Sullivan, Gostisbehere) Matt Hatch - 11:17 (Novak, Bodie) Daniel Carr - PP - 13:51 (Carr, Taylor) Daniel Ciampini - GW - 15:40		Second period	No scoring
(Carr, Ciampini) Mike Vecchione - 07:30 (Hatch) Max Novak - EN - 17:47		Third period	12:49 - Spiro Goulakos (Johnston); 17:16 - EA - Darcy Murphy (Kulevich, Spink)
( 31 saves / 33 shots ) Colin Stevens		Goalie stats	Charlie Finn ( 24 saves / 28 shots )

== Tournament awards ==
=== All-Tournament Team ===
- F Daniel Carr* (Union)
- F Tyson Spink (Colgate)
- F Mike Vecchione (Union)
- D Mathew Bodie (Union)
- D Shayne Gostisbehere (Union)
- G Colin Stevens (Union)

* Most Outstanding Player(s)
