= Alex Lyon (ice hockey) =

American ice hockey player (born 1992)

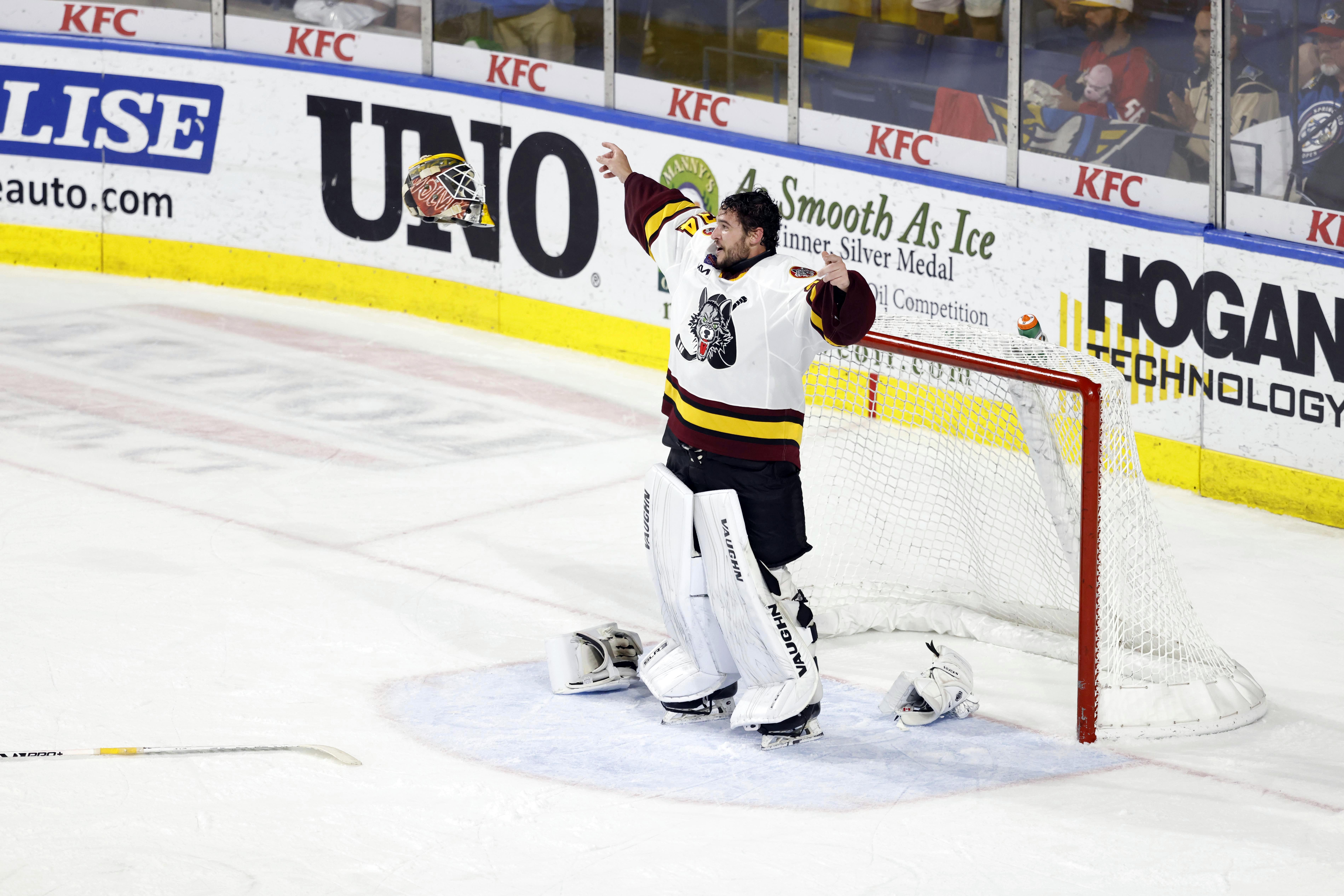
- Lyon with the Chicago Wolves in 2022
- Born: December 9, 1992 (age 33) Baudette, Minnesota, U.S.
- Height: 6 ft 1 in (185 cm)
- Weight: 200 lb (91 kg; 14 st 4 lb)
- Position: Goaltender
- Catches: Left
- NHL team Former teams: Buffalo Sabres; Philadelphia Flyers; Carolina Hurricanes; Florida Panthers; Detroit Red Wings
- National team: United States
- NHL draft: Undrafted
- Playing career: 2016–present

Alexander Augustus Lyon (born December 9, 1992) is an American professional ice hockey player who is a goaltender for the Buffalo Sabres of the National Hockey League (NHL). He played collegiately for the Yale Bulldogs men's ice hockey team, competing in the ECAC.

== Early life ==
Lyon was born on December 9, 1992, in Baudette, Minnesota. For the first seven years of his life, Lyon and his older sister Sam grew up on an island in Lake of the Woods, and he attended school for one year at a small schoolhouse. His parents were fishing lodge managers on the island, while their children took a rowboat to school. The Lyons moved back to mainland Minnesota in 2000, at which point Lyon began playing hockey. Of the 25 male students in Lyon's graduating class at Lake of the Woods High School, 15 played ice hockey for the varsity team, including Lyon. During his senior year in 2009–10, Lyon served as the goaltender for all 26 Lake of the Woods high school games. In those 26 games, he posted a .948 save percentage (SV%).

== Playing career ==
=== NCAA ===
While at Yale University, Lyon was named Ivy League co-Rookie of the Year in 2014. After leading the nation in save percentage, shutouts and goals-against average, Lyon was presented with the Ken Dryden Award (given to the best goalie in the ECAC) his sophomore season, while receiving First-Team AHCA/CCM All-America, First-Team All-ECAC, First-Team All-New England as well as First-Team All-Ivy League honors. He was also the winner of the J. Murray Murdoch Award as Yale's Most Valuable Player.

Individual awards kept rolling in for Lyon after the 2015–16 season, as he repeated as Ken Dryden Award recipient and also landed spots on the All-ECAC First Team, the All-Ivy League First Team and the All-New England First Team for the second straight year.

=== Professional ===
==== Philadelphia Flyers ====
Lyon opted to forgo his senior season at Yale and signed an entry-level contract with the Philadelphia Flyers of the National Hockey League (NHL) on April 5, 2016.

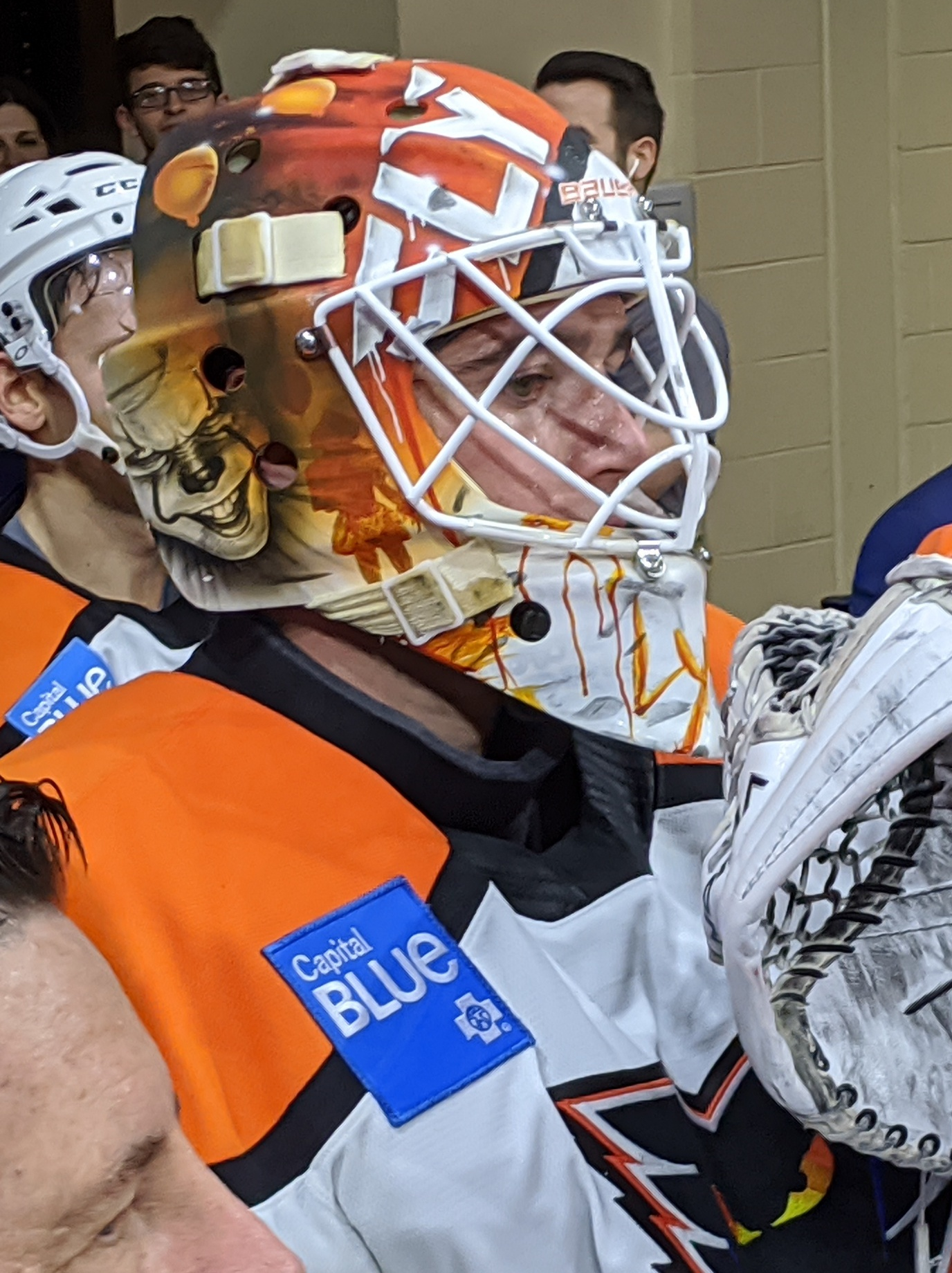
Lyon with the Lehigh Valley Phantoms in 2020

Lyon made his first NHL start February 1, 2018 in a 4–3 loss to the New Jersey Devils. On February 18, 2018, Lyon recorded his first NHL win with the Flyers after replacing an injured Michal Neuvirth in the second period. Lyon saved 25 of 26 shots by the New York Rangers en route to a 7–4 victory.

On May 9, 2018, in a playoff win over the Charlotte Checkers, Lyon saved 94 of 95 shots faced in a record-setting 146 minutes 48 seconds, making it the longest game in AHL history. The game went to the fifth overtime, with the Phantoms winning 2–1.

On November 5, 2018, Lyon was recalled to Philadelphia following an injury to Michal Neuvirth. Lyon was again recalled to the Flyers on November 16.

On January 15, 2020, the Flyers recalled Lyon to the NHL following an injury to Carter Hart. On February 1, 2020, Lyon recorded his first NHL win since March 22, 2018.

==== Carolina Hurricanes ====
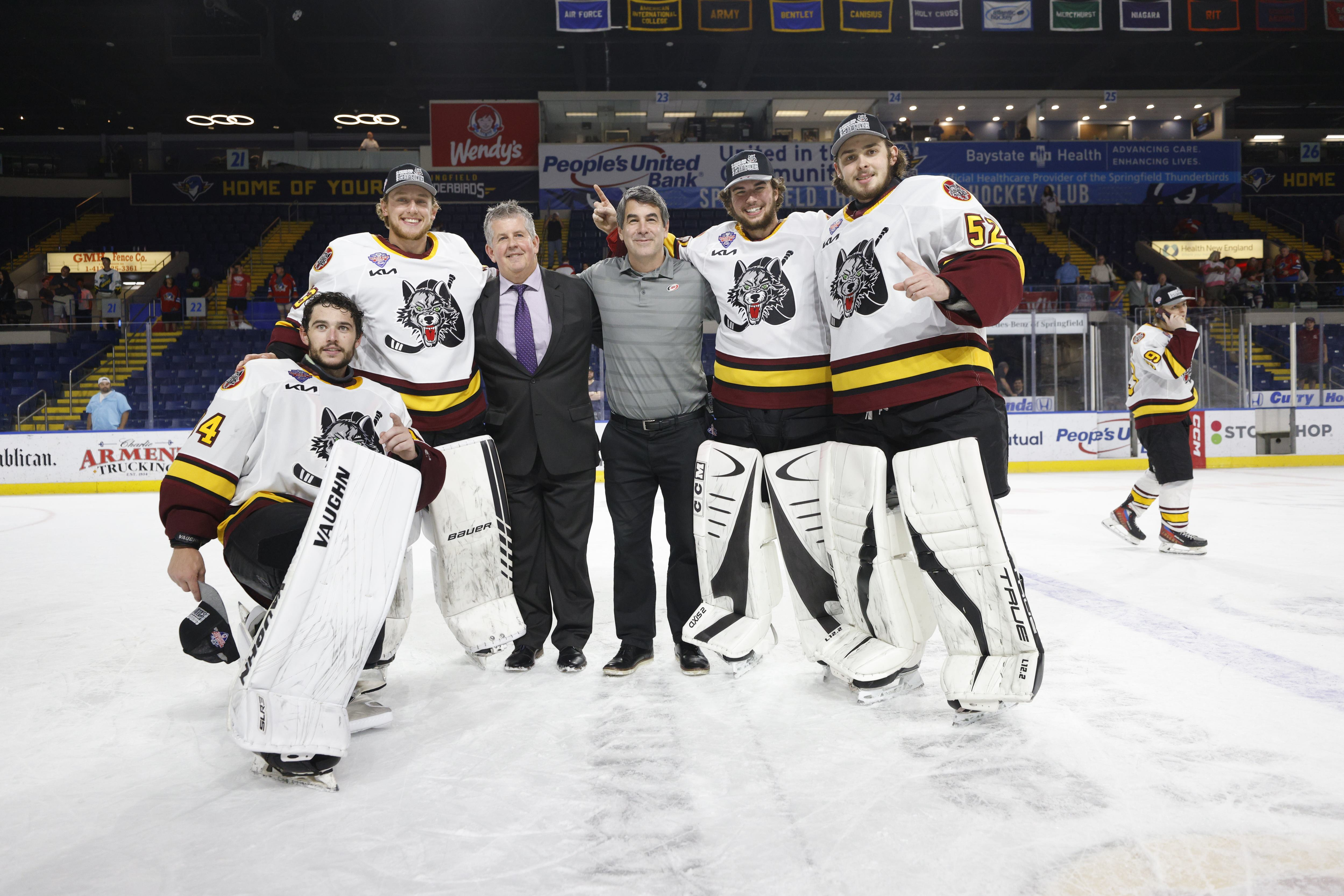
Lyon (left, kneeling) with fellow Chicago Wolves goaltenders

Following the 2020–21 season, his fifth within the Philadelphia Flyers organization, Lyon left as a free agent and was signed to a one-year, two-way contract with the Carolina Hurricanes on July 30, 2021. Lyon played the majority of the season with the Hurricanes' AHL affiliate Chicago Wolves, only tallying two games with the Hurricanes. With the Wolves, Lyon finished the regular season with 18 wins and 3 shutouts, earning him the Hap Holmes Memorial Award for the AHL goaltender with the lowest goals against average. He tallied two additional shutouts in the playoffs, including a 28-save shutout in the final game to win the Calder Cup.

==== Florida Panthers ====
On July 13, 2022, Lyon signed a two-way free agent contract with the Florida Panthers. Lyon posting a 7–2 record with a 2.00 GAA over his last nine starts for the Charlotte Checkers. With Panthers starting goaltender Sergei Bobrovsky ill and regular backup goaltender Spencer Knight participating in the NHL's player assistance program for undisclosed issues, Lyon was called up to the NHL. He proceeded to lead the team on a lengthy winning streak that brought the team back into contention for the 2023 Stanley Cup playoffs, earning the nickname "the Lyon King." Such was his success that he retained the starting role even after Bobrovsky returned, with the latter praising him, saying he "basically saved our season." Lyon started the opening games of the Panthers' first round playoff series against the Boston Bruins. However, with the Bruins leading the Panthers two games to one following Game 3, coach Paul Maurice opted to return Bobrovsky to the net, stating that he felt Lyon was fatigued. Bobrovsky proceeded to lead the team to victory against the Bruins, and onward through the second and third rounds of the playoffs to the 2023 Stanley Cup Final against the Vegas Golden Knights. Lyon served as backup goaltender. He took the ice against in Game 2 of the Finals, relieving Bobrovsky after he allowed four goals.

==== Detroit Red Wings ====
On July 1, 2023, Lyon signed a two-year, $1.8 million contract with the Detroit Red Wings. On November 27, 2024, Lyon sustained a lower-body injury, was placed on injured reserve. During the 2024–25 season, he posted a 14–9–1 record with a 2.81 GAA and .896 save percentage in 30 games.

==== Buffalo Sabres ====
On July 1, 2025, Lyon, a free agent, was signed to a two-year, $3 million contract with the Buffalo Sabres. Following a January 29, 2026, win against the Los Angeles Kings, Lyon set the Sabres records for consecutive wins, at 10, breaking Gerry Desjardins' record set in 1976. During the 2026 playoffs Lyon took over goaltending duties from Ukko-Pekka Luukkonen in the third period of the opening round of the playoffs, in his five starts Lyon allowed only seven goals and had a 1.30 goals-against average with a .950 save percentage in the postseason.

== International play ==
Medal record

Men's ice hockey

Representing the United States

World Championships
Bronze medal – third place	2015 Czech Republic	

Lyon won bronze with the United States national team at the 2015 World Championship, seeing action in one game during the tournament.

== Personal life ==
Along with his play, Lyon has become known for his humor. His running gag known as "Lyon Eyes"—an intense stare at the camera during off-ice footage—has become a favorite antic of fans. After completing a 28-save shutout to give the Chicago Wolves the Calder Cup in 2022, Lyon was suspended for two games as the AHL's online stream captured him flipping double birds as celebratory photos were being taken.

== Career statistics ==
=== Regular season and playoffs ===
			Regular season									Playoffs
Season	Team	League	GP	W	L	T/OT	MIN	GA	SO	GAA	SV%	GP	W	L	MIN	GA	SO	GAA	SV%
2010–11	Cedar Rapids RoughRiders	USHL	1	0	1	0	60	5	0	5.00	.848	—	—	—	—	—	—	—	—
2011–12	Omaha Lancers	USHL	48	28	15	3	2,762	127	4	2.76	.910	4	1	3	237	13	0	3.30	.910
2012–13	Omaha Lancers	USHL	50	26	21	1	2,894	128	1	2.65	.916	—	—	—	—	—	—	—	—
2013–14	Yale Bulldogs	ECAC	30	14	11	5	1,764	71	3	2.41	.918	—	—	—	—	—	—	—	—
2014–15	Yale Bulldogs	ECAC	26	15	7	4	1,517	41	5	1.62	.938	—	—	—	—	—	—	—	—
2015–16	Yale Bulldogs	ECAC	26	18	4	4	1,589	40	4	1.51	.941	—	—	—	—	—	—	—	—
2016–17	Lehigh Valley Phantoms	AHL	47	27	14	0	2,718	124	4	2.74	.912	2	0	1	115	4	0	2.07	.882
2017–18	Lehigh Valley Phantoms	AHL	27	16	8	2	1,548	71	0	2.75	.913	11	6	5	758	25	0	1.98	.944
2017–18	Philadelphia Flyers	NHL	11	4	2	1	480	22	0	2.75	.905	—	—	—	—	—	—	—	—
2018–19	Lehigh Valley Phantoms	AHL	39	19	17	3	2,321	106	1	2.74	.916	—	—	—	—	—	—	—	—
2018–19	Philadelphia Flyers	NHL	2	0	1	0	71	6	0	5.07	.806	—	—	—	—	—	—	—	—
2019–20	Lehigh Valley Phantoms	AHL	32	11	14	5	1,763	79	1	2.69	.913	—	—	—	—	—	—	—	—
2019–20	Philadelphia Flyers	NHL	3	1	1	0	135	8	0	3.55	.890	—	—	—	—	—	—	—	—
2020–21	Lehigh Valley Phantoms	AHL	4	2	1	0	194	11	0	3.40	.874	—	—	—	—	—	—	—	—
2020–21	Philadelphia Flyers	NHL	6	1	3	1	325	18	0	3.33	.893	—	—	—	—	—	—	—	—
2021–22	Chicago Wolves	AHL	30	18	7	3	1,665	60	3	2.16	.912	12	9	3	737	25	2	2.03	.923
2021–22	Carolina Hurricanes	NHL	2	1	0	1	123	6	0	2.93	.908	—	—	—	—	—	—	—	—
2022–23	Charlotte Checkers	AHL	23	13	9	1	1,381	56	1	2.43	.910	—	—	—	—	—	—	—	—
2022–23	Florida Panthers	NHL	15	9	4	2	894	43	1	2.89	.914	4	1	2	199	12	0	3.63	.888
2023–24	Detroit Red Wings	NHL	44	21	18	5	2,498	127	2	3.05	.904	—	—	—	—	—	—	—	—
2024–25	Detroit Red Wings	NHL	30	14	9	1	1,560	73	1	2.81	.896	—	—	—	—	—	—	—	—
2025–26	Buffalo Sabres	NHL	36	20	10	4	1,992	92	3	2.77	.907	10	4	3	463	20	0	2.59	.904
NHL totals			149	71	48	15	8,077	395	7	2.93	.903	14	5	5	662	32	0	2.90	.899

=== International ===
Year	Team	Event	Result	GP	W	L	T	MIN	GA	SO	GAA	SV%
2024	United States	WC	5th	2	1	1	0	82	3	0	2.20	.940
Senior totals				2	1	1	0	82	3	0	2.20	.940

== Awards and honors ==
Award	Year	Ref
College
Ivy League Rookie of the Year	2013–14	
All-Ivy League First Team Honorable Mention	2013–14	
All-Ivy League First Team	2014–15	
All-ECAC Hockey First Team	2014–15	
All-Ivy League First Team	2015–16	
AHL
Harry "Hap" Holmes Memorial Award	2021–22	
Calder Cup champion	2022	

Awards and achievements
Preceded by Colin Stevens	Ken Dryden Award; 2014–15, 2015–16	Succeeded by Kyle Hayton
