= 2013–14 Yale Bulldogs men's ice hockey season =

College ice hockey season

- Conference: 6th ECAC Hockey
- Home ice: Ingalls Rink

Rankings
- USCHO.com: RV
- USA Today: NR

Record
- Overall: 17–11–5
- Conference: 10–8–4
- Home: 10–4–2
- Road: 5–6–3
- Neutral: 2–1–0

Coaches and captains
- Head coach: Keith Allain
- Assistant coaches: Dan Muse; Jason Guerriero; Josh Siembida
- Captain: Jesse Root

The 2013–14 Yale Bulldogs men's ice hockey season was the 119th season of play for the program and the 53rd season in the ECAC Hockey conference. The Bulldogs represented Yale University and were coached by Keith Allain, in his 8th season.

== Season ==
Yale began the defense of their first NCAA Championship with a top-10 preseason ranking. Their regular season kicked off with the Liberty Invitational Tournament and, though they finished third, the Bulldogs found some success early in the season. Initially, the two freshman goaltenders, Alex Lyon and Patrick Spano, traded starts but by mid-November head coach Keith Allain had settled on Lyon as the team's primary netminder.

Through the first half of the season, Yale remained in the hunt to return to the NCAA Tournament. After defeating arch-rival Harvard at Madison Square Gardens they got up to #8 in the national polls, but the team began slipping afterwards. From the third week of January on, Yale wasn't able to sweep a single weekend for the remainder of the regular season. Worse, the team's performance against ranked teams was less than satisfactory. When the ECAC Tournament began, Yale had gone 1–6–2 against ranked teams, which put them on the bubble for an at-large bid. The Bulldogs needed a strong performance in the conference playoff to have any chance at a postseason bid and began their run with two solid wins in the First Round.

Their quarterfinal match against Quinnipiac would decide whether or not Yale could perform against good teams and if it had more hockey yet to play. The answer to both was 'no'; Yale surrendered 11 goals in 2 games and lost to the #6 team, leaving them with just a single win in 11 games against ranked opponents on the year.

== Departures ==
| Player | Position | Nationality | Cause |
|---|---|---|---|
| Josh Balch | Forward | United States | Graduation (retired) |
| Colin Dueck | Defenseman | Canada | Graduation (retired) |
| Antoine Laganière | Forward | Canada | Graduation (signed with Norfolk Admirals) |
| Jeff Malcolm | Goaltender | Canada | Graduation (signed with Hartford Wolf Pack) |
| Nick Maricic | Goaltender | United States | Graduation (retired) |
| Andrew Miller | Forward | United States | Graduation (signed with Edmonton Oilers) |

== Recruiting ==
| Player | Position | Nationality | Age | Notes |
|---|---|---|---|---|
| Tim Bonner | Forward | United States | 21 | Plymouth, MN |
| Frank DiChiara | Forward | United States | 20 | Ronkonkoma, NY |
| Mike Doherty | Forward | United States | 20 | Reading, MA |
| John Hayden | Forward | United States | 18 | Chicago, IL; selected 74th overall in 2013 |
| Chris Izmirlian | Forward | Canada | 20 | Montreal, QC |
| Alex Lyon | Goaltender | United States | 20 | Baudette, MN |
| Dan O'Keefe | Defenseman | United States | 19 | Wall, NJ |
| Patrick Spano | Goaltender | Canada | 20 | Montreal, QC |

== Roster ==
As of February 2014.

| No. | Nat. | Player | Class | Pos | Height | Weight | DoB | Hometown | Previous team | NHL rights |
|---|---|---|---|---|---|---|---|---|---|---|
| 2 | (United States) | Gus Young | Senior | D | 6' 2" (1.88 m) | 207 lb (94 kg) | 1991-07-10 | Dedham, Massachusetts | Noble and Greenough School (USHS–MA) | COL, 184th overall 2009 |
| 3 | (United States) | Dan O'Keefe | Freshman | D | 6' 3" (1.91 m) | 205 lb (93 kg) | 1994-03-06 | North Wall, New Jersey | Surrey Eagles (BCHL) | — |
| 4 | (United States) | Rob O'Gara | Sophomore | D | 6' 4" (1.93 m) | 205 lb (93 kg) | 1993-07-06 | Nesconset, New York | Milton Academy (USHS–MA) | BOS, 151st overall 2011 |
| 5 | (United States) | Tim Bonner | Freshman | F | 5' 9" (1.75 m) | 175 lb (79 kg) | 1992-08-19 | Plymouth, Minnesota | Tri-City Storm (USHL) | — |
| 6 | (United States) | Stu Wilson | Sophomore | F | 5' 10" (1.78 m) | 170 lb (77 kg) | 1991-11-15 | Pittsford, New York | Cedar Rapids RoughRiders (USHL) | — |
| 7 | (United States) | Matt Killian | Junior | D | 6' 1" (1.85 m) | 200 lb (91 kg) | 1992-10-20 | Basking Ridge, New Jersey | Delbarton School (USHS–NJ) | — |
| 9 | (Canada) | Carson Cooper | Sophomore | F | 5' 11" (1.8 m) | 191 lb (87 kg) | 1992-03-18 | Bow Island, Alberta | Fort McMurray Oil Barons (AJHL) | — |
| 10 | (United States) | Mitch Witek | Sophomore | D | 6' 1" (1.85 m) | 205 lb (93 kg) | 1992-02-04 | Downers Grove, Illinois | Waterloo Black Hawks (USHL) | — |
| 11 | (United States) | Trent Ruffolo | Junior | F | 6' 0" (1.83 m) | 180 lb (82 kg) | 1992-01-15 | Coral Springs, Florida | New Hampshire Junior Monarchs (EJHL) | — |
| 12 | (United States) | Cody Learned | Sophomore | F | 5' 9" (1.75 m) | 175 lb (79 kg) | 1991-10-02 | Amherst, New Hampshire | Boston Junior Bruins (EJHL) | — |
| 13 | (United States) | Matthew Beattie | Sophomore | F | 6' 3" (1.91 m) | 190 lb (86 kg) | 1992-12-14 | Whitehouse Station, New Jersey | Phillips Exeter Academy (USHS–NH) | VAN, 207th overall 2012 |
| 14 | (United States) | Ryan Obuchowski | Sophomore | D | 6' 1" (1.85 m) | 185 lb (84 kg) | 1992-06-07 | West Bloomfield, Michigan | Indiana Ice (USHL) | — |
| 16 | (United States) | Alex Ward | Junior | F | 6' 0" (1.83 m) | 180 lb (82 kg) | 1991-11-21 | Burlington, Vermont | Deerfield Academy (USHS–MA) | — |
| 17 | (United States) | Frankie DiChiara | Freshman | F | 6' 2" (1.88 m) | 218 lb (99 kg) | 1993-09-22 | Ronkonkoma, New York | Dubuque Fighting Saints (USHL) | — |
| 18 | (United States) | Kenny Agostino | Senior | F | 6' 1" (1.85 m) | 200 lb (91 kg) | 1992-04-30 | Flanders, New Jersey | Delbarton School (USHS–NJ) | CGY, 140th overall 2010 |
| 19 | (United States) | Anthony Day | Junior | F | 5' 9" (1.75 m) | 175 lb (79 kg) | 1991-05-25 | Buffalo, New York | Waterloo Black Hawks (USHL) | — |
| 20 | (United States) | Jesse Root | Senior | F | 6' 0" (1.83 m) | 185 lb (84 kg) | 1989-11-23 | Pittsburgh, Pennsylvania | Taft (USHS–CT) | — |
| 21 | (United States) | John Hayden | Freshman | F | 6' 3" (1.91 m) | 210 lb (95 kg) | 1995-02-14 | Greenwich, Connecticut | USNTDP (USHL) | CHI, 74th overall 2013 |
| 22 | (United States) | Tommy Fallen | Junior | D | 5' 9" (1.75 m) | 175 lb (79 kg) | 1991-04-17 | Plymouth, Minnesota | Cedar Rapids RoughRiders (USHL) | — |
| 24 | (United States) | Mike Doherty | Freshman | F | 5' 11" (1.8 m) | 170 lb (77 kg) | 1993-08-21 | Reading, Massachusetts | Middlesex Islanders (EJHL) | — |
| 25 | (United States) | Chris Izmirlian | Freshman | F | 5' 10" (1.78 m) | 185 lb (84 kg) | 1992-12-28 | Highland Beach, Florida | Middlesex Islanders (EJHL) | — |
| 26 | (Norway) | Nicholas Weberg | Junior | F | 5' 8" (1.73 m) | 160 lb (73 kg) | 1992-02-20 | Oslo, Norway | Shattuck-Saint Mary's (USHS–MN) | — |
| 27 | (United States) | Charles Orzetti | Sophomore | F | 6' 4" (1.93 m) | 223 lb (101 kg) | 1992-02-28 | Ridgewood, New Jersey | Surrey Eagles (BCHL) | — |
| 29 | (United States) | Connor Wilson | Junior | G | 5' 10" (1.78 m) | 170 lb (77 kg) | 1991-08-30 | Cary, North Carolina | Chicago Steel (USHL) | — |
| 30 | (Canada) | Patrick Spano | Freshman | G | 6' 1" (1.85 m) | 180 lb (82 kg) | 1993-03-01 | Montreal, Quebec | Cowichan Valley Capitals (BCHL) | — |
| 34 | (United States) | Alex Lyon | Freshman | G | 6' 1" (1.85 m) | 200 lb (91 kg) | 1992-12-09 | Baudette, Minnesota | Omaha Lancers (USHL) | — |

=== Coaching staff ===
| Name | Position | Seasons Coaching at Yale University | Alma mater |
|---|---|---|---|
| Keith Allain | Head Coach | 12 | Yale University (1980) |
| Dan Muse | Associate Head Coach | 5 | Stonehill College (2006) |
| Jason Guerriero | Assistant coach | 1 | Northeastern University (2005) |
| Josh Siembida | Volunteer Assistant Coach | 1 | Quinnipiac (2006) |

== Standings ==
- 2013–14 ECAC Hockey men's standings
  | | Conference record | | | | | | | Overall record | | | | | |
  | | GP | W | L | T | PTS | GF | GA | GP | W | L | T | GF | GA |
  |---|---|---|---|---|---|---|---|---|---|---|---|---|---|
  | #1 Union^{†}* | 22 | 18 | 3 | 1 | 37 | 83 | 42 | 42 | 32 | 6 | 4 | 160 | 90 |
  | #12 Colgate | 22 | 13 | 6 | 3 | 29 | 72 | 59 | 39 | 20 | 14 | 5 | 108 | 104 |
  | #7 Quinnipiac | 22 | 12 | 6 | 4 | 28 | 78 | 43 | 40 | 24 | 10 | 6 | 141 | 81 |
  | #16 Cornell | 22 | 11 | 7 | 4 | 26 | 51 | 50 | 32 | 17 | 10 | 5 | 77 | 74 |
  | Clarkson | 22 | 11 | 9 | 2 | 24 | 57 | 64 | 42 | 21 | 17 | 4 | 101 | 102 |
  | Yale | 22 | 10 | 8 | 4 | 24 | 71 | 56 | 33 | 17 | 11 | 5 | 106 | 82 |
  | Rensselaer | 22 | 8 | 9 | 5 | 21 | 57 | 57 | 37 | 15 | 16 | 6 | 104 | 100 |
  | St. Lawrence | 22 | 7 | 11 | 4 | 18 | 70 | 78 | 38 | 15 | 19 | 4 | 122 | 131 |
  | Brown | 22 | 8 | 13 | 1 | 17 | 48 | 62 | 31 | 11 | 17 | 3 | 75 | 87 |
  | Dartmouth | 22 | 7 | 13 | 2 | 16 | 51 | 72 | 34 | 10 | 20 | 4 | 84 | 115 |
  | Harvard | 22 | 6 | 12 | 4 | 16 | 44 | 52 | 31 | 10 | 17 | 4 | 69 | 83 |
  | Princeton | 22 | 4 | 18 | 0 | 8 | 44 | 91 | 32 | 6 | 26 | 0 | 60 | 126 |
  Championship: Union † indicates conference regular season champion (Cleary Cup) * indicates conference tournament champion (Whitelaw Cup); Rankings: USCHO.com Top 20 Poll; updated March 23, 2014

== Schedule and results ==
| Date | Time | Opponent^{#} | Rank^{#} | Site | TV | Decision | Result | Attendance | Record |
Exhibition
| October 19 | 7:00 PM | vs. Ontario Tech* | #7 | Ingalls Rink • New Haven, Connecticut | | Spano | W 9–2 | 1,322 | |
Liberty Invitational Tournament
| October 25 | 4:00 PM | vs. Brown* | #7 | Prudential Center • Newark, New Jersey (Liberty Invitational semifinal) | | Lyon | L 1–4 | 1,209 | 0–1–0 |
| October 26 | 7:05 PM | vs. Princeton* | #7 | Prudential Center • Newark, New Jersey (Liberty Invitational consolation) | | Spano | W 3–2 | 1,546 | 1–1–0 |
Regular season
| November 1 | 7:00 PM | vs. St. Lawrence | #11 | Ingalls Rink • New Haven, Connecticut | | Lyon | T 3–3 ^{OT} | 3,500 | 1–1–1 (0–0–1) |
| November 2 | 7:00 PM | vs. Clarkson | #11 | Ingalls Rink • New Haven, Connecticut | | Spano | W 6–3 | 3,500 | 2–1–1 (1–0–1) |
| November 8 | 7:00 PM | at Princeton | #9 | Hobey Baker Memorial Rink • Princeton, New Jersey | | Spano | W 5–2 | 1,746 | 3–1–1 (2–0–1) |
| November 9 | 7:00 PM | at #5 Quinnipiac | #9 | TD Bank Sports Center • Hamden, Connecticut | | Lyon | T 3–3 ^{OT} | 3,695 | 3–1–2 (2–0–2) |
| November 16 | 7:00 PM | vs. Sacred Heart* | #9 | Ingalls Rink • New Haven, Connecticut | | Lyon | W 5–1 | 3,141 | 4–1–2 |
| November 22 | 7:07 PM | at Colgate | #9 | Class of 1965 Arena • Hamilton, New York | | Lyon | W 5–2 | 1,568 | 5–1–2 (3–0–2) |
| November 23 | 7:03 PM | at #18 Cornell | #9 | Lynah Rink • Ithaca, New York | | Lyon | L 1–2 | 4,013 | 5–2–2 (3–1–2) |
| November 30 | 7:00 PM | vs. Merrimack* | #9 | Ingalls Rink • New Haven, Connecticut | | Lyon | W 3–2 ^{OT} | 3,267 | 6–2–2 |
| December 6 | 7:00 PM | vs. Dartmouth | #8 | Ingalls Rink • New Haven, Connecticut | | Lyon | L 1–4 | 3,421 | 6–3–2 (3–2–2) |
| December 7 | 7:00 PM | vs. Harvard | #8 | Ingalls Rink • New Haven, Connecticut | | Lyon | T 2–2 ^{OT} | 3,500 | 6–3–3 (3–2–3) |
| December 27 | 7:00 PM | vs. Russian Red Stars* | #11 | Ingalls Rink • New Haven, Connecticut (Exhibition) | | Wilson | W 6–3 | 3,145 | |
| December 29 | 4:00 PM | vs. Holy Cross* | #11 | Ingalls Rink • New Haven, Connecticut | | Lyon | W 5–4 | 3,500 | 7–3–3 |
| January 4 | 7:05 PM | at #20 Vermont* | #10 | Gutterson Fieldhouse • Burlington, Vermont | | Lyon | T 3–3 ^{OT} | 4,007 | 7–3–4 |
| January 11 | 3:05 PM | vs. Harvard* | #10 | Madison Square Garden • New York, New York | | Lyon | W 5–1 | 15,524 | 8–3–4 |
| January 17 | 7:00 PM | at #14 Clarkson | #8 | Cheel Arena • Potsdam, New York | | Lyon | L 2–3 | 2,367 | 8–4–4 (3–3–3) |
| January 18 | 7:00 PM | at St. Lawrence | #8 | Appleton Arena • Canton, New York | | Lyon | W 4–2 | 1,837 | 9–4–4 (4–3–3) |
| January 24 | 7:05 PM | at Brown | #10 | Meehan Auditorium • Providence, Rhode Island | | Lyon | L 1–3 | 2,360 | 9–5–4 (4–4–3) |
| January 25 | 7:00 PM | vs. Brown | #10 | Ingalls Rink • New Haven, Connecticut | | Lyon | W 6–0 | 3,500 | 10–5–4 (5–4–3) |
| January 31 | 7:00 PM | vs. #11 Cornell | #13 | Ingalls Rink • New Haven, Connecticut | | Lyon | L 2–3 ^{OT} | 3,500 | 10–6–4 (5–5–3) |
| February 1 | 7:00 PM | vs. #18 Colgate | #13 | Ingalls Rink • New Haven, Connecticut | | Lyon | W 4–1 | 3,500 | 11–6–4 (6–5–3) |
| February 7 | 7:00 PM | at Rensselaer | #13 | Houston Field House • Troy, New York | | Lyon | W 3–2 ^{OT} | 3,639 | 12–6–4 (7–5–3) |
| February 8 | 7:08 PM | at #4 Union | #13 | Achilles Rink • Schenectady, New York | | Lyon | L 3–5 | 2,205 | 12–7–4 (7–6–3) |
| February 14 | 7:05 PM | vs. #4 Quinnipiac | #13 | Ingalls Rink • New Haven, Connecticut | | Lyon | L 0–4 | 3,500 | 12–8–4 (7–7–3) |
| February 15 | 7:00 PM | vs. Princeton | #13 | Ingalls Rink • New Haven, Connecticut | | Lyon | W 7–5 | 3,500 | 13–8–4 (8–7–3) |
| February 21 | 7:00 PM | at Harvard | #14 | Bright-Landry Hockey Center • Boston, Massachusetts | | Lyon | W 5–2 | 2,657 | 14–8–4 (9–7–3) |
| February 22 | 7:05 PM | at Dartmouth | #14 | Thompson Arena • Hanover, New Hampshire | | Lyon | T 2–2 | 4,267 | 14–8–5 (9–7–4) |
| February 28 | 7:00 PM | vs. #3 Union | #15 | Ingalls Rink • New Haven, Connecticut | | Lyon | L 0–2 | 3,500 | 14–9–5 (9–8–4) |
| March 1 | 7:00 PM | vs. Rensselaer | #15 | Ingalls Rink • New Haven, Connecticut | | Lyon | W 5–0 | 3,500 | 15–9–5 (10–8–4) |
ECAC Hockey Tournament
| March 7 | 7:00 PM | vs. Harvard* | #16 | Ingalls Rink • New Haven, Connecticut (First Round Game 1) | | Lyon | W 4–0 | 2,263 | 16–9–5 |
| March 8 | 7:00 PM | vs. Harvard* | #16 | Ingalls Rink • New Haven, Connecticut (First Round Game 2) | | Lyon | W 2–1 | 2,890 | 17–9–5 |
Yale Won Series 2–0
| March 14 | 7:00 PM | at #6 Quinnipiac* | #16 | TD Bank Sports Center • Hamden, Connecticut (Quarterfinal Game 1) | | Lyon | L 2–6 | 3,215 | 17–10–5 |
| March 15 | 7:00 PM | at #6 Quinnipiac* | #16 | TD Bank Sports Center • Hamden, Connecticut (Quarterfinal Game 2) | | Lyon | L 3–5 | 3,479 | 17–11–5 |
Yale Lost Series 0–2
*Non-conference game. ^{#}Rankings from USCHO.com Poll. All times are in Eastern Time.

== Scoring statistics ==
| Name | Position | Games | Goals | Assists | Points | PIM |
|---|---|---|---|---|---|---|
| Jesse Root | C | 30 | 14 | 23 | 37 | 26 |
| Kenny Agostino | LW | 33 | 14 | 18 | 32 | 46 |
| Ryan Obuchowski | D | 32 | 6 | 14 | 20 | 12 |
| Mike Doherty | LW/RW | 27 | 9 | 9 | 18 | 6 |
| Gus Young | D | 33 | 7 | 11 | 18 | 28 |
| Tommy Fallen | D | 33 | 7 | 9 | 16 | 26 |
| Stu Wilson | C | 33 | 6 | 10 | 16 | 23 |
| John Hayden | C/RW | 33 | 6 | 10 | 16 | 18 |
| Anthony Day | RW | 23 | 6 | 7 | 13 | 6 |
| Frankie DiChiara | LW | 32 | 4 | 9 | 13 | 21 |
| Trent Ruffolo | RW | 33 | 1 | 12 | 13 | 12 |
| Cody Learned | F | 27 | 6 | 5 | 11 | 2 |
| Rob O'Gara | D | 33 | 4 | 7 | 11 | 30 |
| Carson Cooper | C | 21 | 3 | 7 | 10 | 14 |
| Chris Izmirlian | F | 28 | 3 | 5 | 8 | 6 |
| Matthew Beattie | LW/RW/D | 22 | 4 | 2 | 6 | 17 |
| Nicholas Weberg | W | 26 | 3 | 2 | 5 | 8 |
| Matt Killian | D | 28 | 2 | 3 | 5 | 6 |
| Mitch Witek | D | 33 | 0 | 5 | 5 | 4 |
| Charles Orzetti | LW | 22 | 1 | 3 | 4 | 23 |
| Alex Lyon | G | 30 | 0 | 2 | 2 | 0 |
| Clinton Bourbonais | C | 1 | 0 | 0 | 0 | 0 |
| Dan O'Keefe | D | 1 | 0 | 0 | 0 | 0 |
| Alex Ward | F | 5 | 0 | 0 | 0 | 0 |
| Tim Bonner | C | 5 | 0 | 0 | 0 | 2 |
| Patrick Spano | G | 5 | 0 | 0 | 0 | 0 |
| Bench | - | 33 | - | - | - | 6 |
| Total | | | 106 | 173 | 279 | 342 |

== Goaltending statistics ==
| Name | Games | Minutes | Wins | Losses | Ties | Goals against | Saves | Shut outs | SV % | GAA |
|---|---|---|---|---|---|---|---|---|---|---|
| Patrick Spano | 5 | 238 | 3 | 0 | 0 | 9 | 90 | 0 | .909 | 2.27 |
| Alex Lyon | 30 | 1764 | 14 | 11 | 5 | 71 | 796 | 3 | .918 | 2.41 |
| Empty Net | - | 12 | - | - | - | 2 | - | - | - | - |
| Total | 33 | 2014 | 17 | 11 | 5 | 82 | 886 | 3 | .915 | 2.44 |

== Rankings ==
| Poll | Week | | | | | | | | | | | | | | | | | | | | | | | | |
| Poll | Pre | 1 | 2 | 3 | 4 | 5 | 6 | 7 | 8 | 9 | 10 | 11 | 12 | 13 | 14 | 15 | 16 | 17 | 18 | 19 | 20 | 21 | 22 | 23 | 24 (Final) |
|---|---|---|---|---|---|---|---|---|---|---|---|---|---|---|---|---|---|---|---|---|---|---|---|---|---|
| USCHO.com | 6 | 7 | 7 | 11 | 9 | 9 | 9 | 9 | 8 | 11 | 11 | 10 | 10 | 8 | 10 | 13 | 13 | 13 | 14 | 15 | 16 | 16 | 20 | NR | NR |
| USA Today | 8 | 6 | 6 | 6 | 11 | 9 | 9 | 9 | 9 | 8 | 11 | 11 | 10 | 8 | 10 | 13 | 13 | 13 | 14 | 14 | 15 | NR | NR | NR | NR |

== Awards and honors ==
| Player | Award | Ref |
|---|---|---|
| Jesse Root | ECAC Best Defensive Forward | |
| Jesse Root | ECAC Hockey Second Team | |
| Kenny Agostino | ECAC Hockey Third Team | |
