= 2013–14 Union Dutchmen ice hockey season =

School ice hockey season

2013–14 Union Dutchmen men's ice hockey season

NCAA Division I champion ECAC Hockey, champion ECAC Hockey Tournament, champion 2014 NCAA Tournament, champion
- Conference: 1st ECAC
- Home ice: Frank L. Messa Rink at Achilles Center

Rankings
- #1: USA Today
- #1: USCHO.com

Record
- Overall: 32–6–4
- Conference: 18–3–1
- Home: 16–3–2
- Road: 12–3–2
- Neutral: 5–1–0

Coaches and captains
- Head coach: Rick Bennett
- Assistant coaches: Joe Dumais; Jason Tapp; John Ronan
- Captain: Mat Bodie
- Alternate captain(s): Daniel Carr; Shayne Gostisbehere

The 2013–14 Union Dutchmen ice hockey team represented Union College in the 2013–14 NCAA Division I men's ice hockey season. The Dutchmen were coached by Rick Bennett, who was in his third season as head coach. His assistant coaches were Joe Dumais, Jason Tapp, and John Ronan. The team captain was Mat Bodie and the assistant captains were Daniel Carr and Shayne Gostisbehere. The Dutchmen played their home games at Frank L. Messa Rink at Achilles Center and were members of the ECAC Hockey conference.

== Season ==
Union finished the regular season with a record of 32 wins, 6 losses, and 1 tie, winning the ECAC regular season title. Seeded first in the 2014 ECAC Tournament, the Dutchmen received a bye into the quarterfinals, where they defeated Dartmouth in a two-game series. In the final rounds in Lake Placid, Union defeated Cornell in the semifinals and Colgate in the final to win the ECAC championship and an automatic bid to the NCAA Tournament.

In the NCAA Tournament, the Dutchmen were the third overall seed and top seed in the East Regional. Union easily beat Vermont in the first round, 5–2, and defeated Providence the next day, 3–1, to advance to the Frozen Four. In the national semifinal in Philadelphia, the Dutchmen fell behind early to Boston College, before taking the lead in the second period and holding off a late push by the Eagles to win, 5–4. Union faced Minnesota in the national title game. After falling behind 2–1 early in the first period, the Dutchmen scored three goals within 1:54 late in the first period to take the lead. Union won the game, 7–4, to clinch the school's first national championship. Defenseman Shayne Gostisbehere was named the tournament's Most Outstanding Player; goalie Colin Stevens, defenseman Mat Bodie, and forward Daniel Ciampini were also named to the All-Tournament Team.

== Roster ==
No.	Nat.	Player	Class	Pos	Height	Weight	DoB	Hometown	Previous team	NHL rights
1		Alex Sakellaropoulos	Freshman	G	6' 2" (1.88 m)	215 lb (98 kg)	1994-02-02	Tinley Park, Illinois	Chicago (USHL)	—
2		Jeff Taylor	Freshman	D	6' 0" (1.83 m)	180 lb (82 kg)	1994-04-13	Clifton Park, New York	Dubuque (USHL)	—
3		Alex Gonye	Senior	F	5' 11" (1.8 m)	175 lb (79 kg)	1994-02-10	New Canaan, Connecticut	Deerfield Academy (USHS–CT)	—
5		Matt Krug	Freshman	D	6' 0" (1.83 m)	198 lb (90 kg)	1992-07-09	South Buffalo, New York	Indiana (USHL)	—
6		Charlie Vasaturo	Junior	D	6' 2" (1.88 m)	210 lb (95 kg)	1990-12-07	Sewell, New Jersey	Salmon Arm (BCHL)	—
7		Michael Pontarelli	Freshman	F	5' 8" (1.73 m)	172 lb (78 kg)	1993-12-22	Laval, Quebec	Cornwall (CCHL)	—
8		Nick Cruice	Sophomore	F	6' 0" (1.83 m)	200 lb (91 kg)	1992-12-11	Dresher, Pennsylvania	South Shore (EJHL)	—
9		Daniel Carr (A)	Senior	F	6' 0" (1.83 m)	190 lb (86 kg)	1991-11-01	Sherwood Park, Alberta	Powell River (BCHL)	—
10		Mark Bennett	Junior	F	6' 0" (1.83 m)	195 lb (88 kg)	1991-07-21	Oakville, Ontario	Oakville (OJHL)	—
11		Sam Coatta	Junior	F	5' 9" (1.75 m)	175 lb (79 kg)	1990-04-09	Minnetonka, Minnesota	Sioux Falls (USHL)	—
12		Eli Lichtenwald	Freshman	F	6' 6" (1.98 m)	235 lb (107 kg)	1992-06-09	Saskatoon, Saskatchewan	Nipawin (SJHL)	—
13		Theo DiPauli	Sophomore	F	5' 9" (1.75 m)	190 lb (86 kg)	1993-02-28	Downers Grove, Illinois	Chicago (USHL)	—
14		Shayne Gostisbehere (A)	Junior	D	5' 11" (1.8 m)	160 lb (73 kg)	1993-04-20	Margate, Florida	South Kent (USHS–CT)	PHI, 78th overall 2012
15		Matt Hatch	Senior	F	5' 11" (1.8 m)	185 lb (84 kg)	1990-05-22	Massena, New York	Alberni Valley (BCHL)	—
16		Kevin Sullivan	Senior	F	6' 0" (1.83 m)	180 lb (82 kg)	1991-01-25	Darien, Connecticut	Berkshire (USHS–MA)	—
17		Daniel Ciampini	Junior	F	6' 0" (1.83 m)	175 lb (79 kg)	1990-11-25	Concord, Ontario	St. Michael's (OJHL)	—
18		Max Novak	Junior	F	5' 11" (1.8 m)	180 lb (82 kg)	1991-04-15	Oak Ridge, New Jersey	New Jersey (EJHL)	—
19		Matt Wilkins	Sophomore	F	5' 11" (1.8 m)	190 lb (86 kg)	1991-01-26	Kimberley, British Columbia	Brooks (AJHL)	—
20		Griffyn Martin	Freshman	D	6' 0" (1.83 m)	187 lb (85 kg)	1994-03-19	Southport, Connecticut	Avon Old Farms (USHS–CT)	—
21		Mike Vecchione	Freshman	F	5' 10" (1.78 m)	195 lb (88 kg)	1993-02-25	Saugus, Massachusetts	Tri-City (USHL)	—
22		Mat Bodie (C)	Senior	D	6' 0" (1.83 m)	165 lb (75 kg)	1990-03-07	East St. Paul, Manitoba	Powell River (BCHL)	—
23		Cole Ikkala	Senior	F	6' 0" (1.83 m)	205 lb (93 kg)	1990-07-27	Romansville, Pennsylvania	Vernon (BCHL)	—
24		Sebastien Gingras	Sophomore	D	6' 2" (1.88 m)	185 lb (84 kg)	1991-03-12	Pierrefonds, Quebec	Brockville (CCHL)	—
26		David Roy	Sophomore	F	6' 3" (1.91 m)	200 lb (91 kg)	1992-02-09	Cumberland, Ontario	Brockville (CCHL)	—
28		Noah Henry	Freshman	D	6' 0" (1.83 m)	195 lb (88 kg)	1994-03-04	Seattle, Washington	Powell River (BCHL)	—
30		Colin Stevens	Junior	G	6' 2" (1.88 m)	170 lb (77 kg)	1993-06-30	Niskayuna, New York	Boston (EJHL)	—
31		Dillon Pieri	Junior	G	6' 0" (1.83 m)	180 lb (82 kg)	1992-03-08	Needham, Massachusetts	Boston Advantage (Midget AAA)	—

== Standings ==
2013–14 ECAC Hockey men's standings
	Conference record							Overall record					
	GP	W	L	T	PTS	GF	GA	GP	W	L	T	GF	GA
#1 Union^{†}*	22	18	3	1	37	83	42	42	32	6	4	160	90
#12 Colgate	22	13	6	3	29	72	59	39	20	14	5	108	104
#7 Quinnipiac	22	12	6	4	28	78	43	40	24	10	6	141	81
#16 Cornell	22	11	7	4	26	51	50	32	17	10	5	77	74
Clarkson	22	11	9	2	24	57	64	42	21	17	4	101	102
Yale	22	10	8	4	24	71	56	33	17	11	5	106	82
Rensselaer	22	8	9	5	21	57	57	37	15	16	6	104	100
St. Lawrence	22	7	11	4	18	70	78	38	15	19	4	122	131
Brown	22	8	13	1	17	48	62	31	11	17	3	75	87
Dartmouth	22	7	13	2	16	51	72	34	10	20	4	84	115
Harvard	22	6	12	4	16	44	52	31	10	17	4	69	83
Princeton	22	4	18	0	8	44	91	32	6	26	0	60	126
Championship: Union † indicates conference regular season champion (Cleary Cup) * indicates conference tournament champion (Whitelaw Cup); Rankings: USCHO.com Top 20 Poll; updated March 23, 2014

== Schedule and results ==
Date	Time	Opponent^{#}	Rank^{#}	Site	Decision	Result	Attendance	Record
Regular Season
October 11	7:30 pm	Bowling Green*	#16	Achilles Center • Schenectady, New York	Sakellaropoulos	T 3–3 ^{OT}	1,921	0–0–1 (0–0–0)
October 12	7:30 pm	Bowling Green*	#16	Achilles Center • Schenectady, New York	Sakellaropoulos	W 5–2	2,198	1–0–1 (0–0–0)
October 18	7:00 pm	Lake Superior State*	#16	Achilles Center • Schenectady, New York	Sakellaropoulos	L 5–6 ^{OT}	1,542	1–1–1 (0–0–0)
October 19	7:00 pm	Lake Superior State*	#16	Achilles Center • Schenectady, New York	Sakellaropoulos	L 2–3	1,429	1–2–1 (0–0–0)
October 25	7:05 pm	at Connecticut*		Mark Edward Freitas Ice Forum • Storrs, Connecticut	Sakellaropoulos	T 2–2 ^{OT}	1,048	1–2–2 (0–0–0)
November 1	7:00 pm	at Dartmouth		Thompson Arena • Hanover, New Hampshire	Stevens	W 7–2	2,347	2–2–2 (1–0–0)
November 2	7:00 pm	at Harvard		Bright Hockey Center • Boston, Massachusetts	Stevens	W 4–2	1,905	3–2–2 (2–0–0)
November 8	7:00 pm	Colgate		Achilles Center • Schenectady, New York	Stevens	L 3–5	1,921	3–3–2 (2–1–0)
November 9	7:00 pm	#15 Cornell		Achilles Center • Schenectady, New York	Stevens	W 3–0	2,144	4–3–2 (3–1–0)
November 15	7:30 pm	#10 RPI		Achilles Center • Schenectady, New York	Stevens	W 4–3	2,254	5–3–2 (4–1–0)
November 16	7:00 pm	at #10 RPI		Houston Field House • Troy, New York	Stevens	W 4–1	4,105	6–3–2 (5–1–0)
November 30	7:00 pm	at Penn State*	#15	Pegula Ice Arena • State College, Pennsylvania	Stevens	W 4–3	5,877	7–3–2 (5–1–0)
December 1	7:00 pm	at Penn State*	#15	Pegula Ice Arena • State College, Pennsylvania	Sakellaropoulos	W 5–4	5,177	8–3–2 (5–1–0)
December 6	7:00 pm	Princeton	#11	Achilles Center • Schenectady, New York	Stevens	W 3–0	1,741	9–3–2 (6–1–0)
December 7	7:00 pm	#5 Quinnipiac	#11	Achilles Center • Schenectady, New York	Stevens	W 6–4	1,921	10–3–2 (7–1–0)
December 11	7:00 pm	Dartmouth	#10	Achilles Center • Schenectady, New York	Stevens	W 3–2	1,591	11–3–2 (8–1–0)
December 13	8:37 pm	at #1 St. Cloud State*	#10	Herb Brooks National Hockey Center • St. Cloud, Minnesota	Sakellaropoulos	W 4–1	4,265	12–3–2 (8–1–0)
December 14	8:07 pm	at #1 St. Cloud State*	#10	Herb Brooks National Hockey Center • St. Cloud, Minnesota	Stevens	T 3–3 ^{OT}	4,327	12–3–3 (8–1–0)
January 10	7:00 pm	at #7 Quinnipiac	#4	High Point Solutions Arena • Hamden, Connecticut	Stevens	L 1–2	3,550	12–4–3 (8–2–0)
January 11	4:00 pm	at Princeton	#4	Hobey Baker Rink • Princeton, New Jersey	Stevens	W 3–0	2,339	13–4–3 (9–2–0)
January 17	7:30 pm	at #17 New Hampshire*	#6	Whittemore Center • Durham, New Hampshire	Stevens	W 3–1	4,045	14–4–3 (9–2–0)
January 18	7:00 pm	at #17 New Hampshire*	#6	Whittemore Center • Durham, New Hampshire	Stevens	W 3–1	4,837	15–4–3 (9–2–0)
January 24	7:00 pm	Harvard	#3	Achilles Center • Schenectady, New York	Stevens	W 4–3	2,169	16–4–3 (10–2–0)
January 25	7:30 pm	vs. RPI*	#3	Times Union Center • Albany, New York	Stevens	L 1–2	7,100	16–5–3 (10–2–0)
January 31	7:00 pm	at St. Lawrence	#4	Appleton Arena • Canton, New York	Stevens	L 1–2	2,150	16–6–3 (10–3–0)
February 1	7:00 pm	at #15 Clarkson	#4	Cheel Arena • Potsdam, New York	Stevens	W 4–3	2,655	17–6–3 (11–3–0)
February 7	7:00 pm	Brown	#4	Achilles Center • Schenectady, New York	Stevens	W 4–3	913	18–6–3 (12–3–0)
February 8	7:00 pm	#13 Yale	#4	Achilles Center • Schenectady, New York	Stevens	W 5–3	2,205	19–6–3 (13–3–0)
February 14	7:00 pm	at #11 Cornell	#3	Lynah Rink • Ithaca, New York	Stevens	W 4–1	4,267	20–6–3 (14–3–0)
February 15	7:00 pm	at #19 Colgate	#3	Starr Rink • Hamilton, New York	Stevens	T 4–4 ^{OT}	1,810	20–6–4 (14–3–1)
February 21	7:00 pm	Clarkson	#3	Achilles Center • Schenectady, New York	Stevens	W 5–0	2,194	21–6–4 (15–3–1)
February 22	7:00 pm	St. Lawrence	#3	Achilles Center • Schenectady, New York	Stevens	W 6–2	2,087	22–6–4 (16–3–1)
February 28	7:00 pm	at #15 Yale	#3	Ingalls Rink • New Haven, Connecticut	Stevens	W 2–0	3,500	23–6–4 (17–3–1)
March 1	4:00 pm	at Brown	#3	Meehan Auditorium • Providence, Rhode Island	Sakellaropoulos	W 3–0	1,290	24–6–4 (18–3–1)
ECAC Tournament
March 14	7:00 pm	Dartmouth	#3	Achilles Center • Schenectady, New York (ECAC Quarterfinal)	Stevens	W 3–0	2,054	25–6–4 (18–3–1)
March 15	7:00 pm	Dartmouth	#3	Achilles Center • Schenectady, New York (ECAC Quarterfinal)	Stevens	W 4–2	2,147	26–6–4 (18–3–1)
March 21	4:07 pm	vs. #13 Cornell	#2	Herb Brooks Arena • Lake Placid, New York (ECAC Semifinal)	Stevens	W 5–2	4,337	27–6–4 (18–3–1)
March 22	7:37 pm	vs. #14 Colgate	#2	Herb Brooks Arena • Lake Placid, New York (ECAC Final)	Stevens	W 5–2	4,850	28–6–4 (18–3–1)
NCAA Tournament
March 28	2:00 pm	vs. #14 Vermont*	#1	Webster Bank Arena • Bridgeport, Connecticut (NCAA East Regional Semifinal)	Stevens	W 5–2	6,529	29–6–4 (18–3–1)
March 29	3:00 pm	vs. #10 Providence*	#1	Webster Bank Arena • Bridgeport, Connecticut (NCAA East Regional Final)	Stevens	W 3–1	6,655	30–6–4 (18–3–1)
April 10	5:00 pm	vs. #3 Boston College*	#1	Wells Fargo Center • Philadelphia, Pennsylvania (NCAA Frozen Four)	Stevens	W 5–4	17,311	31–6–4 (18–3–1)
April 12	7:30 pm	vs. #2 Minnesota*	#1	Wells Fargo Center • Philadelphia, Pennsylvania (NCAA National Final)	Stevens	W 7–4	18,742	32–6–4 (18–3–1)
*Non-conference game. ^{#}Rankings from USCHO.com Poll. All times are in Eastern Time. Source:

== 2014 national championship ==
=== Minnesota vs. Union ===
April 12, 2014; 7:30 pm ESPN	(1E) Union	7–4 (4–2, 0–1, 3–1)	(1W) Minnesota	Wells Fargo Center, Philadelphia; Attendance: 18,742

Game reference
Referees: Geoff Miller; Ryan Hersey; Linesmen: Bob Bernard; Tom George

Scoring summary
Period	Team	Goal	Assist(s)	Time	Score
1st	MIN	Justin Kloos (16)	Condon and Cammarata	02:37	1–0 MIN
1st	UNI	Shayne Gostisbehere (9)	Taylor and Lichtenwald	09:26	1–1
1st	MIN	Sam Warning (14)	Rau and Parenteau	10:03	2–1 MIN
1st	UNI	Mike Vecchione (14)	Carr and Ciampini	15:09	2–2
1st	UNI	Eli Lichtenwald (9)	Gostisbehere	16:06	3–2 UNI
1st	UNI	Daniel Ciampini (23)	Novak and Hatch	17:03	4–2 UNI
2nd	MIN	Taylor Cammarata (10)	Kloos and Parenteau	21:13	4–3 UNI
3rd	UNI	Max Novak (15) – GW	Sullivan and Gingras	45:31	5–3 UNI
3rd	MIN	Hudson Fasching (14) – PP	Boyd and M. Reilly	56:20	5–4 UNI
3rd	UNI	Kevin Sullivan (9)	Bodie and Gostisbehere	58:38	6–4 UNI
3rd	UNI	Mat Bodie (8) – EN	unassisted	59:15	7–4 UNI
Penalty summary
Period	Team	Player	Penalty	Time	PIM
1st	MIN	Brady Skjei	Roughing	00:19	2:00
1st	MIN	Sam Warning	Hooking	03:11	2:00
1st	UNI	Shayne Gostisbehere	Holding	06:42	2:00
1st	UNI	Kevin Sullivan	Hitting after the Whistle	18:44	2:00
1st	MIN	Tom Serratore	Hitting after the Whistle	18:44	2:00
2nd	UNI	Daniel Ciampini	Tripping	22:25	2:00
2nd	MIN	Brady Skjei	Roughing	29:33	2:00
2nd	MIN	Jake Parenteau	Slashing	35:39	2:00
2nd	UNI	Sam Coatta	Holding the Stick	38:06	2:00
3rd	MIN	Nate Condon	Tripping	41:36	2:00
3rd	MIN	Tom Serratore	Holding	49:00	2:00
3rd	MIN	Bench (Served by Justin Kloos)	Too Many Players	51:57	2:00
3rd	UNI	Charlie Vasaturo	Roughing	55:25	2:00

Shots by period
Team	1	2	3	T
Union	20	14	15	49
Minnesota	15	18	7	40

Goaltenders
Team	Name	Saves	Goals against	Time on ice
UNI	Colin Stevens	36	4	59:57
MIN	Adam Wilcox	41	6	58:54
MIN	Michael Shibrowski	1	0	00:45

== Statistics ==
=== Skaters ===
Player	Pos	Yr	GP	G	A	Pts	PIM	PPG	SHG	GWG
Daniel Carr	F	Sr	39	22	28	50	28	7	0	2
Daniel Ciampini	F	Jr	41	23	18	41	26	4	2	5
Mat Bodie	D	Sr	40	8	31	39	57	1	0	0
Kevin Sullivan	F	Sr	39	9	29	38	6	2	0	1
Mike Vecchione	F	Fr	38	14	20	34	32	1	0	1
Shayne Gostisbehere	D	Jr	42	9	25	34	26	4	1	0
Max Novak	F	Jr	32	15	16	31	12	4	0	8
Michael Pontarelli	F	Fr	39	10	13	23	6	6	0	4
Matt Hatch	F	Sr	42	13	9	22	39	0	1	3
Eli Lichtenwald	F	Fr	31	9	12	21	25	4	0	1
Matt Wilkins	F	So	40	6	14	20	46	1	0	3
Jeff Taylor	D	Fr	41	3	13	16	18	0	0	0
Sam Coatta	F	Jr	40	5	6	11	20	0	0	1
Sebastien Gingras	D	So	38	2	9	11	12	1	0	0
Nick Cruice	F	So	35	6	1	7	12	1	0	2
Mark Bennett	F	Jr	22	2	4	6	6	0	0	0
David Roy	F	So	20	0	5	5	2	0	0	0
Charlie Vasaturo	D	Jr	42	0	5	5	55	0	0	0
Cole Ikkala	F	Sr	32	2	2	4	0	0	0	1
Theo DiPauli	F	So	7	2	1	3	4	0	0	0
Matt Krug	D	Fr	18	0	2	2	19	0	0	0
Alex Gonye	F	Fr	6	0	1	1	0	0	0	0
Noah Henry	D	Fr	30	0	1	1	8	0	0	0
Dillon Pieri	G	Jr	1	0	0	0	0	0	0	0
Griffyn Martin	D	Fr	2	0	0	0	0	0	0	0
Alex Sakellaropoulos	G	Fr	8	0	0	0	0	0	0	0
Colin Stevens	G	Jr	36	0	0	0	0	0	0	0
Team			42	160	265	425	459	36	4	32

=== Goaltenders ===
Player	Yr	GP	TOI	W	L	T	GA	GAA	SV	SV%	SO
Colin Stevens	Jr	36	2080	28	4	2	71	2.05	928	0.929	6
Alex Sakellaropoulos	Fr	8	426	4	2	2	17	2.40	158	0.903	1
Dillon Pieri	Jr	1	26	0	0	0	0	0.00	6	1.000	0

== Rankings ==
Poll	Week																									
Poll	Pre	1	2	3	4	5	6	7	8	9	10	11	12	13	14	15	16	17	18	19	20	21	22	23	24	25 (Final)
USCHO.com	16	-	16	NR	NR	NR	NR	17	15	11	10	6	5	4	6	3	4	4	3	3	3	3 (1)	3 (1)	2 (14)	1 (31)	1 (50)
USA Today	12	15	15	NR	NR	NR	NR	15	NR	14	9	7	-	5	6	3	4	6	3	3	3	3	3 (1)	2 (7)	2 (18)	1 (34)

Note: USCHO did not release a poll in week 1, USA Today did not release a poll in week 12.

== Players drafted into the NHL ==
=== 2014 NHL entry draft ===
= NHL All-Star team	= NHL All-Star	= NHL All-Star and NHL All-Star team	= Did not play in the NHL

Round	Pick	Player	NHL team
7	203	Jeff Taylor	Pittsburgh Penguins
