= John Hayden (ice hockey) =

American ice hockey player (born 1995)

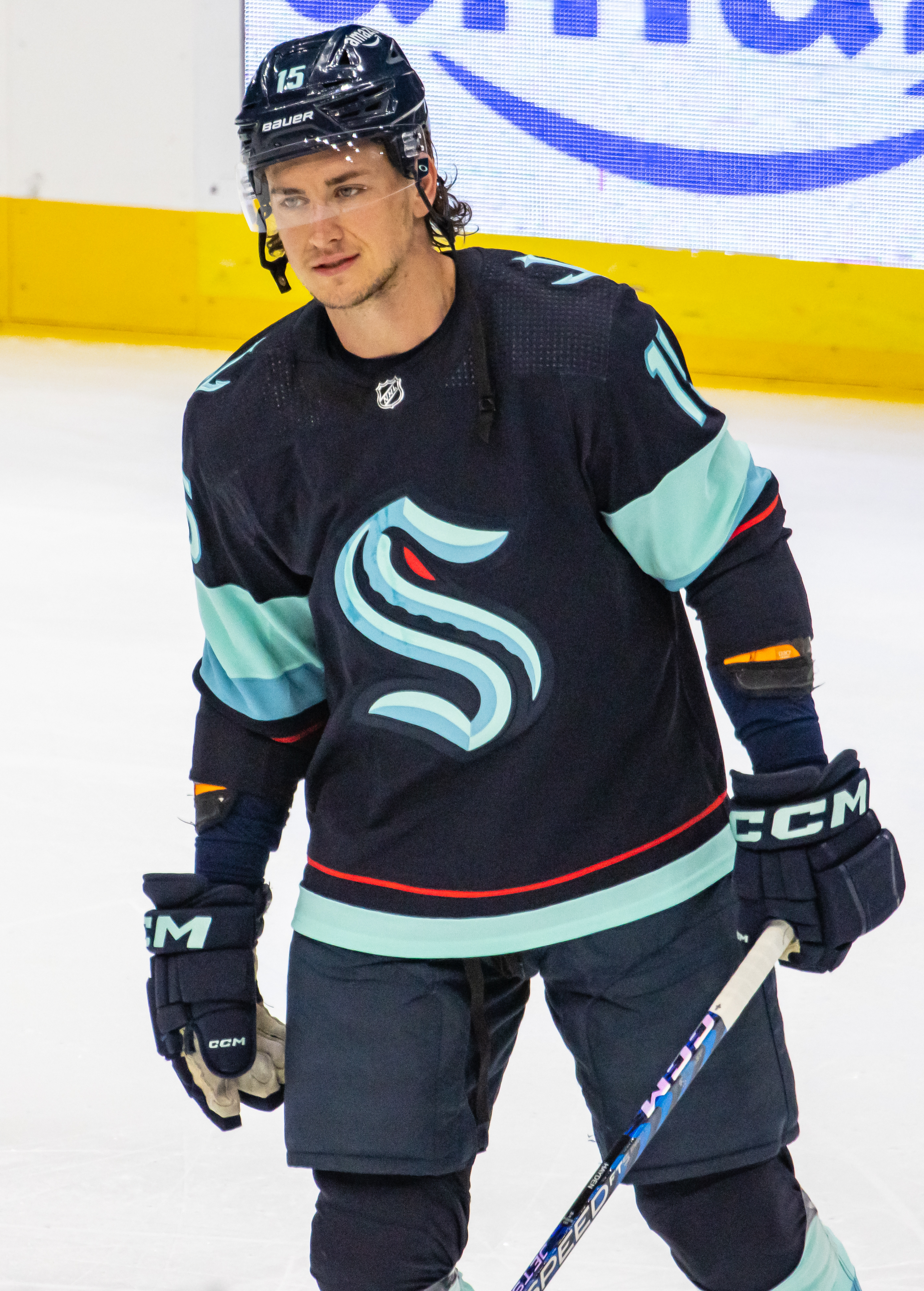
- Hayden with the Seattle Kraken in 2023
- Born: February 14, 1995 (age 31) Chicago, Illinois, U.S.
- Height: 6 ft 3 in (191 cm)
- Weight: 223 lb (101 kg; 15 st 13 lb)
- Position: Right wing
- Shoots: Right
- NHL team (P) Cur. team Former teams: Seattle Kraken; Coachella Valley Firebirds (AHL); Chicago Blackhawks; New Jersey Devils; Arizona Coyotes; Buffalo Sabres
- National team: United States
- NHL draft: 74th overall, 2013; Chicago Blackhawks
- Playing career: 2017–present

John Hayden (born February 14, 1995) is an American professional ice hockey center and Captain for the Coachella Valley Firebirds of the American Hockey League (AHL) while under contract to the Seattle Kraken of the National Hockey League (NHL).

== Early life ==
Hayden was born in Chicago, Illinois but immediately moved to Denver, Colorado before settling in Greenwich, Connecticut with his family when he was eight years old. As a youth, he played in the 2007 and 2008 Quebec International Pee-Wee Hockey Tournaments with the New Hampshire Nike Bauer minor ice hockey team, and then with the Detroit Honeybaked team. He attended Brunswick School before committing to play hockey at Yale University.

== Playing career ==
Hayden was drafted by his hometown team, the Chicago Blackhawks in the third round, 74th overall in the 2013 NHL entry draft, after playing two seasons within the USA Hockey National Team Development Program in the United States Hockey League (USHL).

Upon the completion of his collegiate career, captaining the Bulldogs as a senior in the 2016–17 season, Hayden embarked on his professional career in agreeing to a two-year, entry-level contract on March 15, 2017. He immediately began his contract by making his NHL debut against the Ottawa Senators on March 16. In his second game he scored his first NHL goal against the Toronto Maple Leafs on March 18.

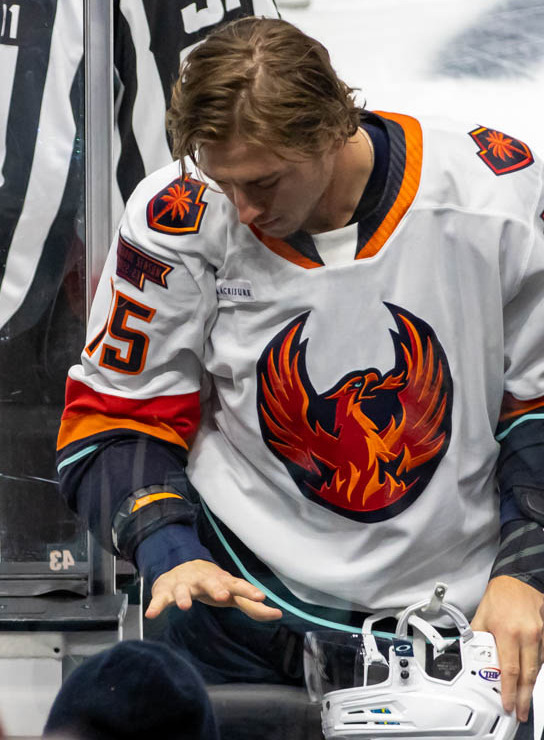
Hayden with the Coachella Valley Firebirds in 2022.

In his first full season with the Blackhawks in the 2018–19 season, Hayden played in a fourth-line role, contributing with 3 goals and 5 points in 54 games.

On June 22, 2019, at the 2019 NHL entry draft, Hayden was traded by the Blackhawks to the New Jersey Devils in exchange for John Quenneville. In the 2019–20 season, Hayden played in 43 games for the New Jersey Devils, playing in a fourth-line forward role recording 3 goals and an assist. As an impending restricted free agent, Hayden was not tendered a qualifying offer from the Devils and was released to free agency on October 8, 2020.

On the following day, Hayden was signed by the Arizona Coyotes after agreeing to a one-year, $750,000 contract. In his lone season with the Coyotes in the pandemic shortened 2020–21 season, Hayden made 29 appearances, posting 2 goals and 5 points.

As an impending restricted free agent, Hayden was not tendered a qualifying offer by the Coyotes, releasing him as a free agent. On July 29, 2021, Hayden was signed to a one-year, two-way contract with the Buffalo Sabres.

On July 14, 2022, Hayden was signed as a free agent to a one-year, two-way contract with the Seattle Kraken.

On June 25, 2025, a promotional film shoot to promote youth hockey featuring Hayden and Seattle Kraken's mascot, Buoy, was interrupted when a grizzly bear aggressively approached the group while Hayden fly fished in Alaska's Katmai National Park and Preserve. The group waded away from the bear as it approached before the bear eventually turned around.

== Personal life ==
Hayden is the son of Diana and Mark Hayden. His brother, Will attended Wake Forest University and his sister Catherine plays for the University of North Carolina field hockey team.

While attending Yale, Hayden majored in political science where he balanced his coursework while playing for the Blackhawks and graduated in 2017. He also worked as an intern for the Pelican Breeze apparel company.

== Career statistics ==
=== Regular season and playoffs ===
			Regular season					Playoffs
Season	Team	League	GP	G	A	Pts	PIM	GP	G	A	Pts	PIM
2009–10	Brunswick School	USHS	28	15	14	29	10	—	—	—	—	—
2010–11	Brunswick School	USHS	26	21	9	30	18	—	—	—	—	—
2011–12	U.S. National Development Team	USHL	36	8	7	15	51	2	0	2	2	2
2012–13	U.S. National Development Team	USHL	24	11	9	20	51	—	—	—	—	—
2013–14	Yale University	ECAC	33	6	10	16	18	—	—	—	—	—
2014–15	Yale University	ECAC	29	7	11	18	10	—	—	—	—	—
2015–16	Yale University	ECAC	32	16	7	23	26	—	—	—	—	—
2016–17	Yale University	ECAC	33	21	13	34	62	—	—	—	—	—
2016–17	Chicago Blackhawks	NHL	12	1	3	4	4	1	0	0	0	0
2017–18	Chicago Blackhawks	NHL	47	4	9	13	54	—	—	—	—	—
2017–18	Rockford IceHogs	AHL	24	5	12	17	7	13	3	0	3	2
2018–19	Chicago Blackhawks	NHL	54	3	2	5	27	—	—	—	—	—
2019–20	New Jersey Devils	NHL	43	3	1	4	77	—	—	—	—	—
2020–21	Arizona Coyotes	NHL	29	2	3	5	37	—	—	—	—	—
2021–22	Buffalo Sabres	NHL	55	2	2	4	84	—	—	—	—	—
2022–23	Coachella Valley Firebirds	AHL	47	17	16	33	58	10	1	1	2	16
2022–23	Seattle Kraken	NHL	7	2	0	2	7	—	—	—	—	—
2023–24	Coachella Valley Firebirds	AHL	65	15	11	26	73	18	9	4	13	10
2023–24	Seattle Kraken	NHL	2	0	0	0	0	—	—	—	—	—
2024–25	Coachella Valley Firebirds	AHL	43	11	16	27	34	6	2	1	3	14
2024–25	Seattle Kraken	NHL	20	1	1	2	31	—	—	—	—	—
2025–26	Coachella Valley Firebirds	AHL	67	13	11	24	127	12	0	4	4	20
2025–26	Seattle Kraken	NHL	3	0	0	0	2	—	—	—	—	—
NHL totals			272	18	21	39	323	1	0	0	0	0

=== International ===
Year	Team	Event	Result	GP	G	A	Pts	PIM
2012	United States	U17	2nd place, silver medalist(s)	5	0	1	1	0
2013	United States	U18	2nd place, silver medalist(s)	7	1	1	2	6
2015	United States	WJC	5th	5	1	0	1	2
2022	United States	WC	4th	10	0	1	1	4
Junior totals				17	2	2	4	8
Senior totals				10	0	1	1	4

== Awards and honors ==
Award	Year
College
All-Ivy League Second Team	2014–15
All-ECAC Hockey Second team	2015–16
