= High school ice hockey in New Jersey =

Ice Hockey is currently played by approximately 161 high school varsity teams in NJ. Teams are divided into conferences: the Gordon Conference, Big North Conference, New Jersey Ice Hockey League, Morris County Secondary School Ice Hockey League, Union County Ice Hockey League, Skylands Conference, Greater Middlesex Conference, Colonial Valley Conference, Shore Conference, Independents, and Prep Schools. Most of these leagues are divided into divisions. A State Championship Tournament is organized at the end of the season by the New Jersey State Interscholastic Athletic Association.

== Divisions ==
Hockey is one of the few sports in the state with "rolling divisions". The divisions can change every year depending on the performance of the teams and new teams formed. The divisions are arranged by geography and skill level. Typically, the last place team in a higher division will be moved into the lower division, with the first place team of the lower division moving into the higher division.

=== Gordon Conference ===
American Division
National Division

=== Big North Conference ===
Patriot Division
Freedom Division
Stripes Division
Stars Division

=== New Jersey Interscholastic Ice Hockey League ===
McInnis Division
Kelly Division
McMullen Division

=== Morris County Secondary School Ice Hockey League ===
Mennen Division
Halvorsen Division
Haas Division

=== Skyland Conference ===
(no divisions)

=== Greater Middlesex Conference ===
(no divisions)

=== Colonial Valley Conference ===
Colonial Division
Valley Division

=== Shore Conference ===
Shore A North
Shore A Central
Shore A South
Shore B North

=== Independents ===
(no divisions)

=== Independence League (prep) ===
(no divisions)

source.

== State Tournament ==
The NJSIAA crowns state champions in four categories; Private, Public A, Public B and Public C. Through 1994, public and private schools played in one state tournament; however, private schools dominated the tournament due to their ability to recruit the best players in the state without geographical limitation. Beginning in 1995, the NJSIAA held separate private and public tournaments, crowning a private and public champion, with these champions playing each other for the overall state championship. In 2005, the NJSIAA eliminated the overall state championship game because a public school had won only once, in 1997. Similarly, in 2008, the Public Tournament was divided into A and B categories based on school enrollment as the smaller schools generally were unable to compete with the larger schools. The public tournament was divided once again in 2018 to include Public C. In the 2021–2022 season the Public C tournament would pivot again to comprise the growing number of cooperative teams in the state. The initial Public C season would have forty-three co-op and tri-op teams competing for the state crown.

To qualify for the State Tournament, teams must have played a minimum of 10 games and compiled a record of .500 or better record by a date set by the NJSIAA, usually around February 15. Teams within four games of .500 may petition for an at-large selection to the Tournament. The NJSIAA may select a maximum of 3 public and 2 private teams for an at-large berth. All members of the Gordon Conference earn automatic entry to the Private Tournament.

In recent years, Delbarton and Randolph have been the dominant private and public hockey programs in the state. Delbarton has appeared in 13 of the last 19 Private School Championships, winning 8 of the last 12; while Randolph has appeared in 11 of the last 15 Public A Championships (8 of the last 9), winning 7 of the last 11. Coincidentally, these two schools are located just seven miles apart in Morris County.

== State Championship History ==
State Championship Finals [7]

1976-Brick 3, Chatham Township 2 (OT)
1977-Brick 3, Livingston 2
1978-West Essex 6, Livingston 3
1979-Brick 2, Seton Hall Prep 1
1980-Livingston 1, Brick 0 (OT)
1981-Montclair 6, Brick 5
1982-Livingston 4, Montclair 2
1983-CBA 3, Seton Hall Prep 0
1984-St. Joseph (Montvale) 7, Brick 6
1985-St. Joseph (Montvale) 4, Brick 2
1986-Brick 2, Delbarton 1
1987-Montclair 4, Delbarton 2
1988-Montclair 2, St. Joseph (Montvale) 1
1989-Delbarton, St. Joseph (Montvale) - Game Cancelled/Co-Champions See Frozen Flashback Archived 2018-08-09 at the Wayback Machine
1990-Brick 2, Montclair 1
1991-ST. JOSEPH (Montvale) 3, Delbarton 2 (OT)
1992-Delbarton 3, St. Joseph (Montvale) 2 (OT)
1993-Toms River North 6, Delbarton 2
1994-CBA 6, Don Bosco Prep 1
1995-CBA 4, Montclair 1
1996-CBA 5, Brick 0
1997-Brick 4, Seton Hall Prep 0
1998-Seton Hall Prep 3, Brick 2
1999-Seton Hall Prep 3, Brick 1
2000-Hudson Catholic 4, Bayonne 2
2001-Bergen Catholic 8, Clifton 1
2002-Delbarton 1, Brick 0
2003-Bergen Catholic 6, Randolph 4
2004-Seton Hall Prep 8, West Essex 0

=== Public Finals ===
1995-Montclair 2, Chatham 1 (OT)
1996-Brick Township 5, Chatham 4
1997-Brick Township 2, Brick Memorial 1 (OT)
1998-Brick Township 2, Montclair 1
1999-Brick Township 5, Randolph 1
2000-Bayonne 6, Summit 3
2001-Clifton 2, Bayonne 1
2002-Brick Township 5, Randolph 1
2003-Randolph 7, Brick Memorial 0
2004-West Essex 0, Ridge 1
2005-Morris Knolls 4, Randolph 1
2006-Randolph 2, Montgomery 1 (OT)
2007-Randolph 5, Bridgewater-Raritan 4 (OT)

Public A

2008-Ridge 5, Watchung Hills 0
2009-Randolph 1, Ridge 0
2010-Toms River South 2, Randolph 1
2011-Randolph 1, Montgomery 0
2012-Randolph 3, Morristown 1
2013-Randolph 4, Bridgewater-Raritan 1
2014-Morris Knolls 3, Bridgewater-Raritan 0
2015-Randolph 2, Howell 1
2016-Morristown 2, Randolph 0
2017-Ridge 2, Watchung Hills 1
2018-Hunterdon Central 5, Woodbridge Twp. 1
2019-Morris Knolls-Hills 6, Hillsborough 1
2020-Morris Knolls 3, Montclair 2
2021-COVID-19 Tournament Cancelled
2022-Ridge 6, Livingston 1

Public B

2008-Kinnelon 5, Jefferson 1
2009-Ramsey 2, Kinnelon 0
2010-West Essex 3, Hopewell Valley 0
2011-Chatham 7, Middletown South 3
2012-Summit 2, Tenafly 1
2013-Chatham 3, Morristown 0
2014-Morristown 1, Ramsey 0
2015-Middletown North 5, Ramsey 4
2016-Ramsey 5, Glen Rock 1
2017-Glen Rock 8, Wall Twp. 1
2018-Northern Highlands 1, Randolph 0
2019-Ridge High School 4, Randolph 1
2020-Randolph 3, Ridge 2
2021-COVID-19 Tournament Cancelled
2022-Northern Highlands 3, Middletown North 1

Public C

2018-Summit 3, Chatham 0
2019-Summit 6, Chatham 2
2020-Summit 5,  Ramsey 2
2021-COVID-19 Tournament Cancelled
2022-Governor Livingston 2, Morris Knolls 0

=== Private Finals ===
1995-CBA 5, Delbarton 0
1996-CBA 4, Seton Hall Prep 3
1997-Seton Hall Prep 4, Delbarton 2
1998-Seton Hall Prep 3, Delbarton 1
1999-Seton Hall Prep 1, Delbarton 0 (OT)
2000-Hudson Catholic 2, Seton Hall Prep 1
2001-Bergen Catholic 3, Christian Brothers 2
2002-Delbarton 2, Seton Hall Prep 1
2003-Bergen Catholic 2, Seton Hall Prep 1
2004-Seton Hall Prep 3, St. Peter's Prep 1
2005-CBA 2, Delbarton 1 (OT)
2006-Delbarton 3, Seton Hall Prep 1
2007-St. Augustine Prep 3, St. Peter's Prep 1
2008-Delbarton 5, St. Augustine Prep 1
2009-Delbarton 7, Christian Brothers 0
2010-Delbarton 7, Gloucester Catholic 2
2011-Delbarton 3, St. Augustine Prep 2 (OT) 
2012-Delbarton 3, Christian Brothers 2
2013-Delbarton 4, Don Bosco 0
2014-Christian Brothers 4, Morristown-Beard 4 (Co-Champions) 
2015-Christian Brothers 4, Delbarton 3 (OT) 
2016-Delbarton 3, Christian Brothers 1
2017-Delbarton 2, Don Bosco 1
2018-Delbarton 4, Don Bosco 2
2019-Don Bosco Prep 3, Delbarton 1
2020-Christian Brothers 4, Don Bosco Prep 1
2021-COVID-19 Tournament Cancelled
2022-Christian Brothers 3, Delbarton 0

Career Scoring Leaders

Name, School, Yr. graduated	Points	Goals	Assists
1-Casey Kutner, Dwight-Englewood (1992)	379	227	152
2-Jim Dowd, Brick (1987)	375	189	186
3-Pat Slocum, Cranford (1996)	316	190	126
4-Chris Bellino, Verona (1993)	315	203	112
5-Pat Verney, Hudson Catholic (1999)	301	117	184
6-Adam Shemansky, Notre Dame (2007)	278	137	141
7-Brett Conrads, Newton (2014)	277	171	106
8-Dave Barbossa, Hudson Catholic (1987)	276	155	121
9-Phil Infusino, West Essex (1990)	273	166	107
10-Bryan Bowser, Notre Dame (1997)	273	139	134
11-Dale Scherholz, Hightstown (2000)	271	153	118
12 (Tied)-Bobby Acropolis, Brick (2000)	265	131	134
12 (Tied)-David Infantino, St. Joseph Regional Prep (1989)	265	133	132
13-Chris Ohlweiler, Chatham Township (1983)	258	124	134
14-John Demers, Notre Dame (1989)	257	179	78
15-Andrew Redvanly, Pascack Valley (2004)	256	156	100
16-Pat DiMarco, TRN (2) & Peddie (1990-4th year)	256	n/a	n/a
17-Sean Boylan, Old Tappan (2011)	253	141	112
18-Andy McLaughlin, Seton Hall Prep (1988)	248	113	135
19-Dale Reinhardt, Delbarton (2004)	246	119	127
20-Derek Maguire, Delbarton (1990)	242	110	132
21-Dave Bodson, Bayonne (2000)	241	114	127
22-Glenn Yanotta, Whippany Park (1987)	238	118	120
23-Mike Kronfeld, Tenafly (2006)	238	118	120
24-Charlie Mule, Toms River East (2014)	237	139	98
24-Ryan Enrico, St. Peter's Prep (1998)	237	141	96
26-Scheuer, Paramus Catholic (2000)	236	102	134

Scoring Champions

Year	Name, School	Points	Goals	Assists
1979	John Hanifin, Don Bosco Prep	98	62	36
1980	Ed Towers, Morristown Beard	98	53	45
1981	Don Julich, Livingston	89	44	45
1982	Don Julich, Livingston	91	40	51
1983	Chris Ohlweiler, Chatham Township	88	30	58
1984	Bruno Bisiacchi, Hudson Catholic	111	66	45
1985	Jim Dowd, Brick	113	58	55
1986	Jim Dowd, Brick	98	47	51
1987	Jim Dowd, Brick	115	62	53
1988	Jeff Ohlweiler, Chatham	112	67	45
1989	Ken Blum, St. Joseph Montvale	109	50	59
1990	Casey Kutner, Dwight-Englewood	90	55	35
1991	Bobby Guth, St. Joseph Montvale	86	53	33
1992	Casey Kutner, Dwight-Englewood	110	64	46
1993	Paul Giblin, Bergen Catholic	116	76	40
1994	Brian Martin, Roxbury	84	42	42
1995	J.J. Picinic, Bergen Catholic	104	59	45
1996	Pat Slocum, Cranford	115	67	48
1997	Dave McKenna, Bayonne	81	36	45
1998	Adam Dilly, Mendham	102	70	32
1999	Dave Bodson, Bayonne	99	40	59
2000	Tyler Reinhardt, Livingston	111	52	59
2001	Tyler Reinhardt, Livingston	96	51	45
2002	Adam Tousant, Hightstown	82	49	33
2003	Andrew Redvanly, Pascack Valley/ Matt Feinbloom, Montville	92	49	43
2004	Jacob Simon, West Orange	84	30	54
2005	J.T. Baxter, Morris Knolls	89	47	42
2006	Anthony Yelovich, Clifton	99	52	47
2007	Dean Combos, Jefferson	95	51	44
2013	Grant Jozefek, Mendham	103	51	52
