= Colin Stevens =

American ice hockey player

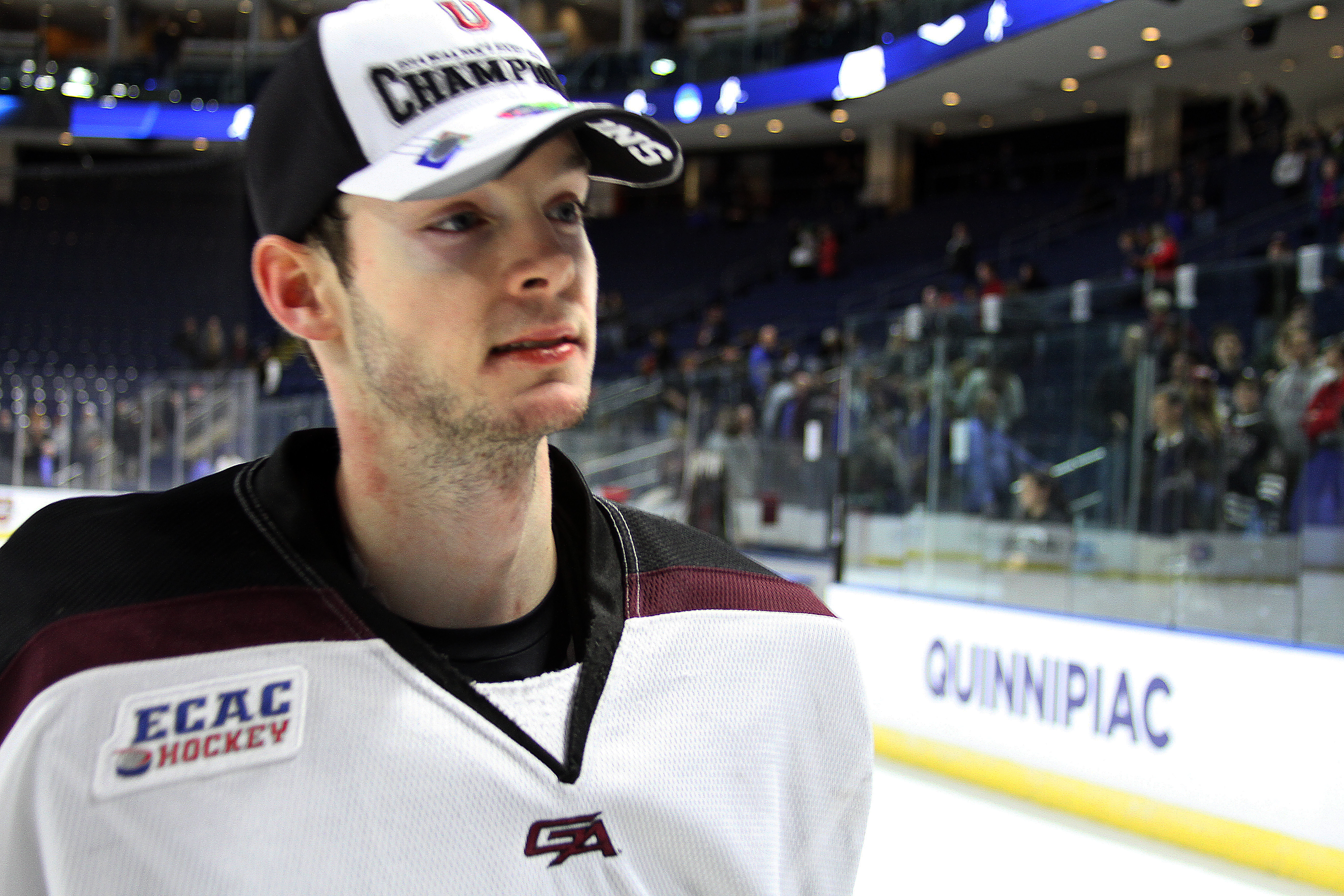
- Stevens with Union College during the 2014 NCAA Division I men's ice hockey tournament
- Born: June 30, 1993 (age 33) Niskayuna, New York, U.S.
- Height: 6 ft 2 in (188 cm)
- Weight: 180 lb (82 kg; 12 st 12 lb)
- Position: Goaltender
- Caught: Left
- Played for: WBS Penguins
- NHL draft: Undrafted
- Playing career: 2015–2018

Colin Stevens (born June 30, 1993) is an American former professional ice hockey goaltender.

== Playing career ==
Stevens played collegiate hockey with the Union Dutchmen in the NCAA Men's Division I ECAC Hockey conference. In his junior year, Stevens's outstanding play led the team to a Division I National Championship and he was rewarded with a selection to the 2013–14 ECAC Hockey All-Conference First Team.

After his senior season with the Dutchmen, Stevens embarked on his professional career in agreeing to an entry-level contract with the Florida Panthers of the NHL on March 20, 2015.

For the duration of his tenure within the Panthers organization, Stevens was allocated exclusively to the ECHL with the Manchester Monarchs and Tulsa Oilers. At the conclusion of his entry-level deal, Stevens was expectedly released as a free agent by the Panthers.

On August 7, 2017, Stevens opted to continue in the ECHL, securing a contract with the Wheeling Nailers. He opened the 2017–18 season with the Nailers, appearing in 3 games, before he was signed to a professional tryout contract with AHL affiliate, the Wilkes-Barre/Scranton Penguins on October 25, 2017.

== Awards and honors ==
| Award | Year |
|---|---|
College
| All-ECAC Hockey First Team | 2013–14 |
| AHCA East Second-Team All-American | 2013–14 |
| ECAC Hockey All-Tournament Team | 2014 |
| NCAA All-Tournament Team | 2014 |

Awards and achievements
| Preceded by Eric Hartzell | Ken Dryden Award; 2013–14 | Succeeded by Alex Lyon |
