= Lake of the Woods School =

Coordinates: 48.7125000°N 94.6291667°W

Lake of the Woods High School
- 236 15th Avenue Southwest; Baudette, MN 56623; United States

Information
- Other name: Lake of the Woods Secondary
- Type: Public
- Principal: Mary Merchant
- Teaching staff: 14.54 (FTE)
- Grades: 6–12
- Enrollment: 228 (2024-2025)
- Student to teacher ratio: 15.68
- Colors: Maroon and gold
- Athletics conference: North Border Conference
- Nickname: Bears
- Website: lakeofthewoodsschool.org/high-school/

Lake of the Woods High School is a public high school in Baudette, Minnesota, United States. The Lake of the Woods School organization operates both an elementary and a high school.
