= 2013–14 NCAA Division I men's ice hockey season =

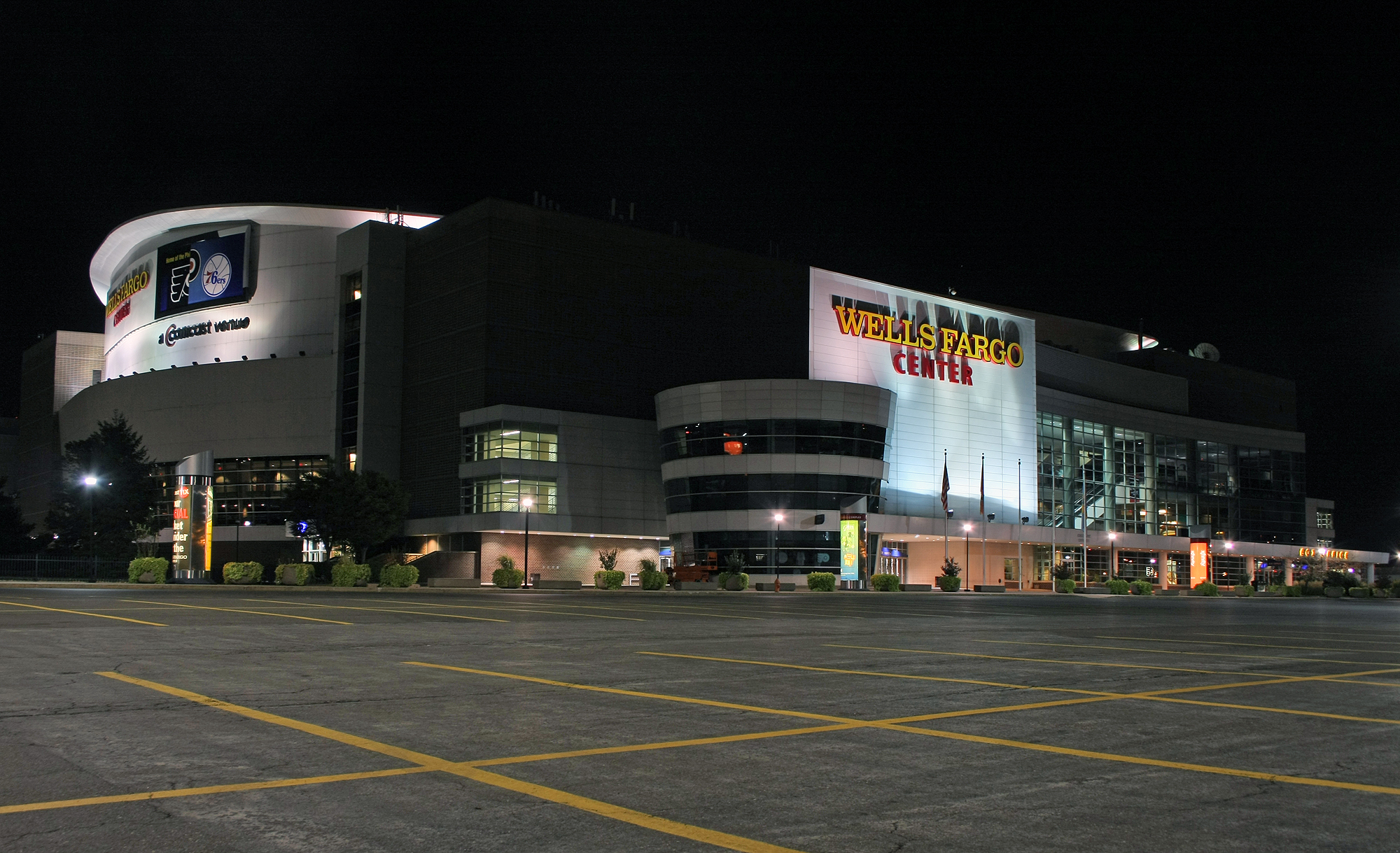
- The Wells Fargo Center in Philadelphia hosted the 2014 Frozen Four
- Duration: October 5, 2013– April 12, 2014
- NCAA tournament: 2014
- National championship: Wells Fargo Center; Philadelphia, Pennsylvania
- NCAA champion: Union
- Hobey Baker Award: Johnny Gaudreau (Boston College)

The 2013–14 NCAA Division I men's ice hockey season began in October 2013 and ended with the 2014 NCAA Division I Men's Ice Hockey Tournament's championship game in April 2014. This was the 67th season in which an NCAA ice hockey championship was held, and the 120th year overall in which an NCAA school fielded a team.

== Conference realignment ==
The March 2011 announcement that the Big Ten Conference would start sponsoring men's ice hockey in the 2013–14 season, which came shortly after Penn State had announced that it would upgrade its team from club to full varsity status effective in 2012–13, led to a major wave of conference realignment in that sport. Once the Big Ten took the ice with six teams, the Central Collegiate Hockey Association (CCHA) faced the loss of three of its mainstays (Michigan, Michigan State, Ohio State), while the Western Collegiate Hockey Association (WCHA) was set to lose two prominent members (Minnesota and Wisconsin).

Several CCHA and WCHA members then entered into talks to break away from their current leagues to form a new conference; six of these schools would soon form the National Collegiate Hockey Conference (NCHC), which would also take the ice in 2013–14. Further moves by both the NCHC and WCHA would eventually lead to the demise of the CCHA after the 2012–13 season. The upheaval also gave Hockey East its first non-New England member in Notre Dame.

In the end, the only conferences that neither gained nor lost members for 2013–14 were Atlantic Hockey and ECAC Hockey. The former conference would go on to lose UConn to Hockey East, which was already home to the school's women's team, for the 2014–15 season.

=== Membership changes ===
School	Former Conference	New Conference
Alabama–Huntsville Chargers	Independent	WCHA
Alaska Nanooks	CCHA	WCHA
Bowling Green Falcons	CCHA	WCHA
Colorado College Tigers	WCHA	NCHC
Denver Pioneers	WCHA	NCHC
Ferris State Bulldogs	CCHA	WCHA
Lake Superior State Lakers	CCHA	WCHA
Miami RedHawks	CCHA	NCHC
Michigan Wolverines	CCHA	Big Ten
Michigan State Spartans	CCHA	Big Ten
Minnesota Golden Gophers	WCHA	Big Ten
Minnesota–Duluth Bulldogs	WCHA	NCHC
North Dakota (no nickname)	WCHA	NCHC
Northern Michigan Wildcats	CCHA	WCHA
Notre Dame Fighting Irish	CCHA	Hockey East
Ohio State Buckeyes	CCHA	Big Ten
Omaha Mavericks	WCHA	NCHC
Penn State Nittany Lions	Independent	Big Ten
St. Cloud State Huskies	WCHA	NCHC
Western Michigan Broncos	CCHA	NCHC
Wisconsin Badgers	WCHA	Big Ten

== Season Outlook ==
=== Pre-season polls ===
The top teams in the nation as ranked before the start of the season.

The U.S. College Hockey Online poll was voted on by coaches, media, and NHL scouts. The USA Today/USA Hockey Magazine poll was voted on by coaches and media.

USCHO Poll
Rank	Team
1	UMass Lowell (19)
2	Miami (14)
3	Wisconsin (2)
4	Boston College
5	Minnesota (1)
6	Yale (8)
7	North Dakota
8	Notre Dame
9	St. Cloud State
10	Quinnipiac (1)
11	Michigan
11	Minnesota State
13	New Hampshire
14	Providence
15	RPI
16	Union
17	Denver
18	Western Michigan
19	Boston University
20	Niagara

USA Today Poll
Rank	Team
1	UMass Lowell (20)
2	Miami (9)
3	Wisconsin (1)
4	Boston College
5	Minnesota
6	North Dakota
7	Notre Dame
8	Yale (4)
9	St. Cloud State
10	Michigan
11	Quinnipiac
12	Union
13	New Hampshire
14	Minnesota State
15	Providence

== Regular season ==
=== Standings ===
2013–14 Atlantic Hockey standings
	Conference record							Overall record					
	GP	W	L	T	PTS	GF	GA	GP	W	L	T	GF	GA
Mercyhurst^{†}	27	17	4	6	40	107	65	41	21	13	7	148	124
Bentley	27	16	7	4	36	100	67	37	19	14	4	127	99
Air Force	27	15	9	3	33	81	73	39	21	14	4	115	106
Connecticut	27	15	9	3	33	75	61	36	18	14	4	91	86
Robert Morris*	27	13	9	5	31	95	78	42	19	18	5	145	130
Niagara	27	11	11	5	27	89	78	40	15	20	5	113	122
Canisius	27	11	13	3	25	81	78	41	17	21	3	120	125
Holy Cross	27	11	13	3	25	68	72	39	14	22	3	97	114
RIT	27	10	14	3	23	67	84	37	12	20	5	94	124
Sacred Heart	27	11	16	0	22	75	99	36	12	24	0	82	137
American International	27	9	17	1	19	74	107	36	10	25	1	90	151
Army	27	5	22	0	10	60	110	34	6	28	0	73	146
Championship: Robert Morris † indicates conference regular season champion; * indicates conference tournament champion Rankings: USCHO.com Top 20 Poll; updated March 23, 2014

2013–14 Big Ten ice hockey standings
	Conference record								Overall record					
	GP	W	L	T	SOW	PTS	GF	GA	GP	W	L	T	GF	GA
#2 Minnesota^{†}	20	14	3	3	0	45	59	37	41	28	7	6	143	86
#7 Wisconsin*	20	13	6	1	0	40	63	46	37	24	11	2	120	95
#16 Michigan	20	10	8	2	1	33	68	59	35	18	13	4	107	89
#20 Ohio State	20	6	9	5	4	27	53	55	37	18	14	5	119	100
Michigan State	20	5	9	6	4	25	42	55	36	11	18	7	79	93
Penn State	20	3	16	1	0	10	42	75	36	8	26	2	80	129
Championship: Wisconsin † indicates conference regular season champion; * indicates conference tournament champion Rankings: USCHO.com Top 20 Poll; updated March 23, 2014

2013–14 ECAC Hockey men's standings
	Conference record							Overall record					
	GP	W	L	T	PTS	GF	GA	GP	W	L	T	GF	GA
#1 Union^{†}*	22	18	3	1	37	83	42	42	32	6	4	160	90
#12 Colgate	22	13	6	3	29	72	59	39	20	14	5	108	104
#7 Quinnipiac	22	12	6	4	28	78	43	40	24	10	6	141	81
#16 Cornell	22	11	7	4	26	51	50	32	17	10	5	77	74
Clarkson	22	11	9	2	24	57	64	42	21	17	4	101	102
Yale	22	10	8	4	24	71	56	33	17	11	5	106	82
Rensselaer	22	8	9	5	21	57	57	37	15	16	6	104	100
St. Lawrence	22	7	11	4	18	70	78	38	15	19	4	122	131
Brown	22	8	13	1	17	48	62	31	11	17	3	75	87
Dartmouth	22	7	13	2	16	51	72	34	10	20	4	84	115
Harvard	22	6	12	4	16	44	52	31	10	17	4	69	83
Princeton	22	4	18	0	8	44	91	32	6	26	0	60	126
Championship: Union † indicates conference regular season champion (Cleary Cup) * indicates conference tournament champion (Whitelaw Cup); Rankings: USCHO.com Top 20 Poll; updated March 23, 2014

2013–14 Hockey East men's standings
	Conference record							Overall record					
	GP	W	L	T	PTS	GF	GA	GP	W	L	T	GF	GA
#3 Boston College^{†}	20	16	2	2	34	75	40	40	28	8	4	164	94
#5 Massachusetts–Lowell*	20	11	6	3	25	54	43	41	26	11	4	116	77
#10 Providence	20	11	7	2	24	50	49	39	22	11	6	115	88
#18 New Hampshire	20	11	9	0	22	64	51	41	22	18	1	126	106
#19 Northeastern	20	10	8	2	22	52	51	37	19	14	4	117	103
Maine	20	9	8	3	21	59	48	35	16	15	4	102	83
#14 Vermont	20	10	10	0	20	49	48	38	20	15	3	105	89
#9 Notre Dame	20	9	9	2	20	43	40	40	23	15	2	120	86
Boston University	20	5	12	3	13	43	66	35	10	21	4	81	113
Massachusetts	20	4	13	3	11	42	61	34	8	22	4	76	106
Merrimack	20	3	15	2	8	32	66	33	8	22	3	62	97
Championship: Massachusetts–Lowell † indicates conference regular season champion; * indicates conference tournament champion Rankings: USCHO.com Top 20 Poll; updated March 23, 2014

2013–14 National Collegiate Hockey Conference standings
	Conference record								Overall record					
	GP	W	L	T	SOW	PTS	GF	GA	GP	W	L	T	GF	GA
#8 St. Cloud State^{†}	24	15	6	3	0	48	87	64	38	22	11	5	136	107
#13 North Dakota	24	15	9	0	0	45	76	63	42	25	14	3	127	102
Omaha	24	13	9	2	1	42	82	69	37	17	18	2	117	120
Minnesota–Duluth	24	11	11	2	2	37	69	70	36	16	16	4	104	104
Western Michigan	24	11	11	2	2	37	66	69	40	19	16	5	103	106
#17 Denver*	24	10	11	3	2	35	60	58	42	20	16	6	112	98
Colorado College	24	6	13	5	1	24	52	72	37	7	24	6	74	121
Miami	24	6	17	1	1	20	56	80	38	15	20	3	111	115
Championship: Denver † indicates conference regular season champion; * indicates conference tournament champion Rankings: USCHO.com Top 20 Poll; updated March 23, 2014

2013–14 Western Collegiate Hockey Association standings
	Conference record							Overall record					
	GP	W	L	T	PTS	GF	GA	GP	W	L	T	GF	GA
#6 Ferris State^{†}	28	20	6	2	42	92	62	43	29	11	3	138	94
#11 Minnesota State*	28	20	7	1	41	95	58	41	26	14	1	130	95
Alaska	28	14	12	2	30	97	77	37	18	15	4	126	103
Bowling Green	28	13	11	4	30	89	73	39	18	15	6	119	104
Michigan Tech	28	12	11	5	29	78	78	40	14	19	7	99	108
Alaska–Anchorage	28	12	12	4	28	74	77	38	18	16	4	105	107
Northern Michigan	28	13	14	1	27	77	75	38	15	21	2	102	108
Bemidji State	28	10	14	4	24	72	76	38	10	21	7	92	118
Lake Superior State	28	12	16	0	24	70	84	36	16	19	1	94	114
Alabama–Huntsville	28	2	25	1	5	30	114	38	2	35	1	41	166
Championship: Minnesota State † indicates conference regular season champion (MacNaughton Cup); * indicates conference tournament champion (Broadmoor Trophy); Rankings: USCHO.com Top 20 Poll; updated March 23, 2014

== 2014 NCAA Tournament ==
Regional Semi-finals
1	Minnesota	7
4	Robert Morris	3
West Regional
2	Notre Dame	3
3	St. Cloud State	4*
1	Wisconsin	2
4	North Dakota	5
Midwest Regional
2	Ferris State	1
3	Colgate	0
1	Boston College	6
4	Denver	2
Northeast Regional
2	Massachusetts–Lowell	2
3	Minnesota State	1
1	Union	5
4	Vermont	2
East Regional
2	Quinnipiac	0
3	Providence	4

Regional Finals
1	Minnesota	4
3	St. Cloud State	0
4	North Dakota	2**
2	Ferris State	1
1	Boston College	4
2	Massachusetts–Lowell	3
1	Union	3
3	Providence	1

Frozen Four
W1	Minnesota	2
MW4	North Dakota	1
NE1	Boston College	4
E1	Union	5

National Championship
W1	Minnesota	4
E1	Union	7

Note: * denotes overtime period(s)

== Player stats ==
=== Scoring leaders ===
GP = Games played; G = Goals; A = Assists; Pts = Points; PIM = Penalty minutes

Player	Class	Team	GP	G	A	Pts	PIM
Johnny Gaudreau	Junior	Boston College	40	36	44	80	14
Kevin Hayes	Senior	Boston College	40	27	38	65	16
Greg Carey	Senior	St. Lawrence	38	18	39	57	39
Cody Wydo	Junior	Robert Morris	42	31	23	54	19
Brett Gensler	Senior	Bentley	37	21	32	53	10
Bill Arnold	Senior	Boston College	40	14	39	53	51
Kevin Goumas	Senior	New Hampshire	40	19	33	52	42
Daniel Carr	Senior	Union	39	22	28	50	28
Alex Grieve	Junior	Bentley	37	25	22	47	28
Zac Lynch	Sophomore	Robert Morris	42	19	28	47	68
Austin Czarnik	Junior	Miami	37	13	34	47	28

=== Leading goaltenders ===
GP = Games played; Min = Minutes played; W = Wins; L = Losses; T = Ties; GA = Goals against; SO = Shutouts; SV% = Save percentage; GAA = Goals against average

Player	Class	Team	GP	Min	W	L	T	GA	SO	SV%	GAA
Connor Hellebuyck	Sophomore	Massachusetts–Lowell	29	1747:49	18	9	2	52	6	.941	1.79
Cole Huggins	Freshman	Minnesota State	34	1880:08	21	8	1	59	6	.926	1.88
Michael Garteig	Sophomore	Quinnipiac	40	2409:29	24	10	6	78	6	.910	1.94
Adam Wilcox	Sophomore	Minnesota	38	2281:37	26	6	6	75	4	.932	1.97
Zane McIntyre	Sophomore	North Dakota	33	1929:59	20	10	3	64	3	.926	1.99
Steve Summerhays	Senior	Notre Dame	38	2233:52	21	14	2	76	7	.923	2.04
Colin Stevens	Junior	Union	36	2080:11	28	4	2	71	6	.929	2.05
Steve Perry	Junior	Clarkson	24	1402:29	11	10	3	48	4	.917	2.05
Lukas Hafner	Sophomore	Western Michigan	21	1047:26	9	6	2	36	2	.925	2.06
Joel Rumpel	Junior	Wisconsin	29	1713:57	21	6	1	59	2	.929	2.07

== Awards ==
=== NCAA ===
Award		Recipient
Hobey Baker Award		Johnny Gaudreau, Boston College
Spencer T. Penrose Award		Rick Bennett, Union
Tim Taylor Award		Sam Anas, Quinnipiac
Mike Richter Award		Connor Hellebuyck, Massachusetts–Lowell
Derek Hines Unsung Hero Award		Brice O'Connor, Maine
Lowe's Senior CLASS Award		Brock Higgs, Rensselaer
Tournament Most Outstanding Player		Shayne Gostisbehere, Union
AHCA All-American Teams
East First Team	Position	West First Team
Connor Hellebuyck, Massachusetts–Lowell	G	Sam Brittain, Denver
Mathew Bodie, Union	D	Jake McCabe, Wisconsin
Shayne Gostisbehere, Union	D	Mike Reilly, Minnesota
Greg Carey, St. Lawrence	F	Josh Archibald, Omaha
Johnny Gaudreau, Boston College	F	Nic Dowd, St. Cloud State
Kevin Hayes, Boston College	F	Ryan Dzingel, Ohio State
East Second Team	Position	West Second Team
Colin Stevens, Union	G	Adam Wilcox, Minnesota
Ben Hutton, Maine	D	Joey LaLeggia, Denver
Mike Matheson, Boston College	D	Colton Parayko, Alaska
Daniel Carr, Union	F	Austin Czarnik, Miami
Ryan Haggerty, Rensselaer	F	Cody Kunyk, Alaska
Devin Shore, Maine	F	Michael Mersch, Wisconsin
	F	Kyle Rau, Minnesota

=== Atlantic Hockey ===
Award		Recipient
Player of the Year		Jimmy Sarjeant, Mercyhurst
Best Defensive Forward		Daniel O'Donoghue, Mercyhurst
Best Defenseman		Nick Jones, Mercyhurst
Rookie of the Year		Justin Danforth, Sacred Heart
Individual Sportsmanship		Jason Fabian, Air Force
Individual Sportsmanship		Nick Jones, Mercyhurst
Regular Season Scoring Trophy		Brett Gensler, Bentley
Regular Season Goaltending Award		Jimmy Sarjeant, Mercyhurst
Team Sportsmanship Award		American International
Coach of the Year		Rick Gotkin, Mercyhurst
Most Valuable Player in Tournament		Cody Wydo, Robert Morris
All-Atlantic Hockey Teams
First Team	Position	Second Team
Jimmy Sarjeant, Mercyhurst	G	Branden Komm, Bentley
Nick Jones, Mercyhurst	D	Matt Blomquist, Bentley
Steve Weinstein, Bentley	D	Adam McKenzie, Air Force
Brett Gensler, Bentley	F	Alex Grieve, Bentley
Matthew Zay, Mercyhurst	F	Cole Gunner, Air Force
Cody Wydo, Robert Morris	F	Daniel O'Donoghue, Mercyhurst
Third Team	Position	Rookie Team
Terry Shafer, Robert Morris	G	Chris Truehl, Air Force
Ben Danford, Canisius	D	Vince Muto, Niagara
Kevin Ryan, Niagara	D	Mitch Nylen, Sacred Heart
Andrew Gladiuk, Bentley	F	Justin Danforth, Sacred Heart
Brant Harris, Connecticut	F	David Norris, American International
Jon Puksar, American International	F	C. J. Reuschlein, Army

=== Big Ten ===
Award		Recipient
Player of the Year		Adam Wilcox, Minnesota
Defensive Player of the Year		Mike Reilly, Minnesota
Goaltender of the Year		Adam Wilcox, Minnesota
Freshman of the Year		J. T. Compher, Michigan
Coach of the Year		Don Lucia, Minnesota
Tournament Most Outstanding Player		Mark Zengerle, Wisconsin
All-Big Ten Teams
First Team	Position	Second Team
Adam Wilcox, Minnesota	G	Joel Rumpel, Wisconsin
Jake McCabe, Wisconsin	D	Mac Bennett, Michigan
Mike Reilly, Minnesota	D	Frankie Simonelli, Wisconsin
Ryan Dzingel, Ohio State	F	J. T. Compher, Michigan
Michael Mersch, Wisconsin	F	Nic Kerdiles, Wisconsin
Mark Zengerle, Wisconsin	F	Kyle Rau, Minnesota
Honorable Mention	Position	Freshman Team
Jake Hildebrand, Michigan State	G	Christian Frey, Ohio State
Jake Chelios, Michigan State	D	Drew Brevig, Ohio State
Ben Marshall, Minnesota	D	Michael Downing, Michigan
Brady Skjei, Minnesota	D	–
Andrew Copp, Michigan	F	J. T. Compher, Michigan
Hudson Fasching, Minnesota	F	Hudson Fasching, Minnesota
Alex Guptill, Michigan	F	Nick Schilkey, Ohio State
Sam Warning, Minnesota	F	–
Greg Wolfe, Michigan State	F	–

=== ECAC ===
Award		Recipient
Player of the Year		Greg Carey, St. Lawrence
Player of the Year		Shayne Gostisbehere, Union
Best Defensive Forward		Jesse Root, Yale
Best Defensive Defenseman		Shayne Gostisbehere, Union
Best Defensive Defenseman		Dennis Robertson, Brown
Rookie of the Year		Sam Anas, Quinnipiac
Rookie of the Year		Gavin Bayreuther, St. Lawrence
Ken Dryden Award		Colin Stevens, Union
Tim Taylor Award		Don Vaughan, Colgate
Student-Athlete of the Year		Andy Iles, Cornell
Most Outstanding Player in Tournament		Daniel Carr, Union
All-ECAC Hockey Teams
First Team	Position	Second Team
Colin Stevens, Union	G	Andy Iles, Cornell
Shayne Gostisbehere, Union	D	Gavin Bayreuther, St. Lawrence
Mathew Bodie, Union	D	Joakim Ryan, Cornell
Greg Carey, St. Lawrence	F	Sam Anas, Quinnipiac
Daniel Carr, Union	F	Kellen Jones, Quinnipiac
Ryan Haggerty, Rensselaer	F	Jesse Root, Yale
Third Team	Position	Rookie Team
Charlie Finn, Colgate	G	Charlie Finn, Colgate
Spiro Goulakas, Colgate	D	Gavin Bayreuther, St. Lawrence
Dennis Robertson, Brown	D	James de Haas, Clarkson
Kenny Agostino, Yale	F	Sam Anas, Quinnipiac
Daniel Ciampini, Union	F	Matt Carey, St. Lawrence
Brian Ferlin, Cornell	F	Mike Vecchione, Union

=== Hockey East ===
Award		Recipient
Player of the Year		Johnny Gaudreau, Boston College
Best Defensive Forward		Bill Arnold, Boston College
Best Defensive Forward		Ross Mauermann, Providence
Best Defensive Defenseman		Josh Manson, Northeastern
Rookie of the Year		Mario Puskarich, Vermont
Goaltending Champion		Thatcher Demko, Boston College
Len Ceglarski Award		Ross Mauermann, Providence
Three-Stars Award		Clay Witt, Northeastern
Charlie Holt Team Sportsmanship Award		New Hampshire
Bob Kullen Coach of the Year Award		Jerry York, Boston College
William Flynn Tournament Most Valuable Player		Connor Hellebuyck, Massachusetts-Lowell
All-Hockey East Teams
First Team	Position	Second Team
Connor Hellebuyck, UMass Lowell	G	Clay Witt, Northeastern
Ben Hutton, Maine	D	Stephen Johns, Notre Dame
Mike Matheson, Boston College	D	Eric Knodel, New Hampshire
	D	Josh Manson, Northeastern
Johnny Gaudreau, Boston College	F	Kevin Goumas, New Hampshire
Kevin Hayes, Boston College	F	Chris McCarthy, Vermont
Devin Shore, Maine	F	Kevin Roy, Northeastern
Honorable Mention	Position	Rookie Team
Thatcher Demko, Boston College	G	Thatcher Demko, Boston College
Garrett Noonan, Boston University	D	Michael Kapla, UMass Lowell
Michael Paliotta, Vermont	D	Steven Santini, Boston College
Bill Arnold, Boston College	F	Robbie Bailargeon, Boston University
Ross Mauermann, Providence	F	Vince Hinostroza, Notre Dame
	F	Mario Puskarich, Vermont
	F	Mike Szmatula, Northeastern

=== NCHC ===
Award		Recipient
Player of the Year		Josh Archibald, Omaha
Rookie of the Year		Jaccob Slavin, Colorado College
Goaltender of the Year		Sam Brittain, Denver
Forward of the Year		Josh Archibald, Omaha
Defenseman of the Year		Joey LaLeggia, Denver
Offensive Defenseman of the Year		Joey LaLeggia, Denver
Defensive Forward of the Year		Nic Dowd, St. Cloud State
Scholar-Athlete of the Year		Nic Dowd, St. Cloud State
Sportsmanship Award		Eamonn McDermott, Colorado College
Herb Brooks Coach of the Year		Bob Motzko, St. Cloud State
Tournament MVP		Daniel Doremus, Denver
All-NCHC Teams
First Team	Position	Second Team
Sam Brittain, Denver	G	Ryan Faragher, St. Cloud State
Joey LaLeggia, Denver	D	Jordan Schmaltz, North Dakota
Dillon Simpson, North Dakota	D	Jaccob Slavin, Colorado College
Josh Archibald, Omaha	F	Chase Balisy, Western Michigan
Nic Dowd, St. Cloud State	F	Riley Barber, Miami
Austin Czarnik, Miami	F	Michael Parks, North Dakota
Honorable Mention	Position	Rookie Team
Zane Gothberg, North Dakota	G	Charlie Lindgren, St. Cloud State
David Makowski, Denver	D	Paul LaDue, North Dakota
Andrew Prochno, St. Cloud State	D	Jaccob Slavin, Colorado College
Jonny Brodzinski, St. Cloud State	F	Jake Guentzel, Omaha
Rocco Grimaldi, North Dakota	F	Alex Iafallo, Minnesota–Duluth
Ryan Walters, Omaha	F	Trevor Moore, Denver

=== WCHA ===
Award		Recipient
Player of the Year		Cody Kunyk, Alaska
Student-Athlete of the Year		Chad Brears, Alabama–Huntsville
Defensive Player of the Year		Colton Parayko, Alaska
Rookie of the Year		Alex Globke, Lake Superior State
Scoring Champion		Cody Kunyk, Alaska
Goaltending Champion		Cole Huggins, Minnesota State
Coach of the Year		Bob Daniels, Ferris State
Most Valuable Player in Tournament		Cole Huggins, Minnesota State
All-WCHA Teams
First Team	Position	Second Team
C. J. Motte, Ferris State	G	Cole Huggins, Minnesota State
Zach Palmquist, Minnesota State	D	Scott Czarnowczan, Ferris State
Colton Parayko, Alaska	D	Kevin Czuczman, Lake Superior State
Matt Bailey, Alaska Anchorage	F	Colton Beck, Alaska
Cody Kunyk, Alaska	F	Jean-Paul Lafontaine, Minnesota State
Matt Leitner, Minnesota State	F	Garrett Thompson, Ferris State
Third Team	Position	Rookie Team
Kevin Kapalka, Lake Superior State	G	Cole Huggins, Minnesota State
Jason Binkley, Ferris State	D	Sean Flanagan, Minnesota State
Matt Prapavessis, Bemidji State	D	Shane Hanna, Michigan Tech
–	D	Ruslan Pedan, Bemidji State
Zach Lehrke, Minnesota State	F	Marcus Basara, Alaska
Johnny McInnis, Minnesota State	F	Alex Globke, Lake Superior State
Tyler Morley, Alaska	F	Kyle Schempp, Ferris State

=== Hober Baker Award ===
Hobey Baker Award Finalists
Player	Position	School
Josh Archibald	Forward	Nebraska–Omaha
Greg Carey	Forward	St. Lawrence
Nic Dowd	Forward	St. Cloud State
Ryan Dzingel	Forward	Ohio State
Johnny Gaudreau	Forward	Boston College
Shayne Gostisbehere	Defenceman	Union
Kevin Hayes	Forward	Boston College
C. J. Motte	Goaltender	Ferris State
Joel Rumpel	Goaltender	Wisconsin
Adam Wilcox	Goaltender	Minnesota

== 2014 NHL entry draft ==
Round	Pick	Player	College	Conference	NHL team
1	15	Dylan Larkin ^{†}	Michigan	Big Ten	Detroit Red Wings
1	18	Alex Tuch ^{†}	Boston College	Hockey East	Minnesota Wild
1	20	Nick Schmaltz ^{†}	North Dakota	NCHC	Chicago Blackhawks
2	36	Thatcher Demko	Boston College	Hockey East	Vancouver Canucks
2	41	Josh Jacobs ^{†}	Michigan State	Big Ten	New Jersey Devils
2	47	Ryan Collins ^{†}	Minnesota	Big Ten	Columbus Blue Jackets
2	51	Jack Dougherty ^{†}	Wisconsin	Big Ten	Nashville Predators
2	55	Brandon Montour ^{†}	Massachusetts	Hockey East	Anaheim Ducks
2	56	Ryan Donato ^{†}	Harvard	ECAC Hockey	Boston Bruins
2	57	Johnathan MacLeod ^{†}	Boston University	Hockey East	Tampa Bay Lightning
3	64	Brandon Hickey ^{†}	Boston University	Hockey East	Calgary Flames
3	67	Warren Foegele ^{†}	New Hampshire	Hockey East	Carolina Hurricanes
3	69	Jack Glover ^{†}	Minnesota	Big Ten	Winnipeg Jets
3	80	Louie Belpedio ^{†}	Miami	NCHC	Minnesota Wild
3	82	Jake Walman ^{†}	Providence	Hockey East	St. Louis Blues
3	83	Matteson Iacopelli ^{†}	Western Michigan	NCHC	Chicago Blackhawks
3	86	Mark Friedman ^{†}	Bowling Green	WCHA	Philadelphia Flyers
3	88	Beau Starrett ^{†}	Cornell	ECAC Hockey	Chicago Blackhawks
4	91	William Lagesson ^{†}	Massachusetts	Hockey East	Edmonton Oilers
4	92	Joe Wegwerth ^{†}	Notre Dame	Hockey East	Florida Panthers
4	98	Fredrik Olofsson ^{†}	Omaha	NCHC	Chicago Blackhawks
4	100	Shane Eiserman	New Hampshire	Hockey East	Ottawa Senators
4	103	J. J. Piccinich ^{†}	Boston University	Hockey East	Toronto Maple Leafs
4	105	Michael Prapavessis ^{†}	Rensselaer	ECAC Hockey	Dallas Stars
4	108	Devon Toews	Quinnipiac	ECAC Hockey	New York Islanders
4	110	Austin Poganski ^{†}	North Dakota	NCHC	St. Louis Blues
4	111	Zach Nagelvoort	Michigan	Big Ten	Edmonton Oilers
4	113	Sam Lafferty ^{†}	Brown	ECAC Hockey	Pittsburgh Penguins
4	116	Danton Heinen ^{†}	Denver	NCHC	Boston Bruins
4	120	Steve Johnson ^{†}	Minnesota	Big Ten	Los Angeles Kings
5	121	Max Willman ^{†}	Brown	ECAC Hockey	Buffalo Sabres
5	125	Nikolas Koberstein ^{†}	Alaska	WCHA	Montreal Canadiens
5	128	Dakota Joshua ^{†}	Ohio State	Big Ten	Toronto Maple Leafs
5	129	C. J. Franklin	Minnesota State	WCHA	Winnipeg Jets
5	130	Liam Coughlin ^{†}	Vermont	Hockey East	Edmonton Oilers
5	134	Shane Gersich ^{†}	North Dakota	NCHC	Washington Capitals
5	136	Chase Perry ^{†}	Colorado College	NCHC	Detroit Red Wings
5	137	Tyler Bird ^{†}	Brown	ECAC Hockey	Columbus Blue Jackets
5	141	Luc Snuggerud ^{†}	Omaha	NCHC	Chicago Blackhawks
5	142	Tyler Nanne ^{†}	Minnesota	Big Ten	New York Rangers
5	143	Miguel Fidler ^{†}	Ohio State	Big Ten	Florida Panthers
5	145	Anthony Angello ^{†}	Cornell	ECAC Hockey	Pittsburgh Penguins
5	146	Anders Bjork ^{†}	Notre Dame	Hockey East	Boston Bruins
6	153	Tyler Vesel ^{†}	Omaha	NCHC	Edmonton Oilers
6	155	Kyle Schempp	Ferris State	WCHA	New York Islanders
6	158	Nolan Vesey ^{†}	Maine	Hockey East	Toronto Maple Leafs
6	159	Steven Spinner ^{†}	Omaha	NCHC	Washington Capitals
6	177	Hayden Hawkey ^{†}	Providence	Hockey East	Montreal Canadiens
6	178	Dylan Sikura ^{†}	Northeastern	Hockey East	Chicago Blackhawks
7	189	Kelly Summers ^{†}	Clarkson	ECAC Hockey	Ottawa Senators
7	191	Jared Fiegl ^{†}	Cornell	ECAC Hockey	Arizona Coyotes
7	192	Matt Ustaski ^{†}	Wisconsin	Big Ten	Winnipeg Jets
7	202	Dwyer Tschantz ^{†}	Cornell	ECAC Hockey	St. Louis Blues
7	203	Jeff Taylor	Union	ECAC Hockey	Pittsburgh Penguins
7	207	Jake Evans ^{†}	Notre Dame	Hockey East	Montreal Canadiens
7	208	Jack Ramsey ^{†}	Minnesota	Big Ten	Chicago Blackhawks

† incoming freshman

== See also ==
- 2013–14 NCAA Division II men's ice hockey season
- 2013–14 NCAA Division III men's ice hockey season
