= 2015 ECAC Hockey men's ice hockey tournament =

2015 ECAC Men's ice hockey tournament
- 2015 ECAC Hockey Men's Ice Hockey Tournament logo
- Dates: March 6–21, 2015
- Teams: 12
- Finals site: Herb Brooks Arena; Lake Placid, New York
- Champions: Harvard (9th title)
- Winning coach: Ted Donato (2nd title)
- MVP: Jimmy Vesey (Harvard)
- ECAC Men's Ice Hockey Tournaments

The 2015 ECAC Hockey Men's Ice Hockey Tournament was the 54th tournament in league history. It was played between March 6 and March 21, 2015. First Round and Quarterfinal games were played at home team campus sites, while the final four games were played at the Herb Brooks Arena in Lake Placid, New York. By winning the tournament, the Harvard Crimson received the ECAC's automatic bid to the 2015 NCAA Division I Men's Ice Hockey Tournament.

== Format ==
The tournament featured four rounds of play. The teams that finished above fifth place in the standings received a bye to the quarterfinal round. In the first round, the fifth and twelfth seeds, the sixth and eleventh seeds, the seventh and tenth seeds and the eighth and ninth seeds played a best-of-three series with the winners advancing to the quarterfinals. In the quarterfinals the one seed played the lowest remaining seed, the second seed played the second-lowest remaining seed, the third seed played the third-lowest remaining seed and the fourth seed played the fourth-lowest remaining seed another best-of-three series with the winners of these the series advanced to the Semifinals. In the semifinals the top remaining seed played the lowest remaining seed while the two remaining teams played against each other. The winners of the semifinals played in the championship game while the losers played in a third-place game. All series after the quarterfinals were single-elimination games. The tournament champion received an automatic bid to the 2015 NCAA Division I Men's Ice Hockey Tournament.

== Conference standings ==
Note: GP = Games played; W = Wins; L = Losses; T = Ties; PTS = Points; GF = Goals For; GA = Goals Against

2014–15 ECAC Hockey men's standings
	Conference record							Overall record					
	GP	W	L	T	PTS	GF	GA	GP	W	L	T	GF	GA
#14 Quinnipiac^{†}	22	16	3	3	35	60	37	39	23	12	4	106	89
St. Lawrence	22	14	7	1	29	70	41	37	20	14	3	113	75
#15 Yale	22	12	6	4	28	60	37	33	18	10	5	86	54
#19 Colgate	22	11	7	4	26	53	51	38	22	12	4	102	82
Dartmouth	22	12	8	2	26	64	55	33	17	12	4	91	78
#11 Harvard*	22	11	8	3	25	71	54	37	21	13	3	121	92
Cornell	22	9	9	4	22	45	46	31	11	14	6	57	68
Clarkson	22	8	11	3	19	49	47	37	12	20	5	81	87
Rensselaer	22	8	12	2	18	53	66	41	12	26	3	77	131
Union	22	8	13	1	17	58	63	39	19	18	2	122	104
Brown	22	5	14	3	13	44	80	31	8	20	3	65	112
Princeton	22	2	18	2	6	25	75	30	4	23	3	39	99
Championship: March 21, 2015 † indicates conference regular season champion (Cleary Cup) * indicates conference tournament champion (Whitelaw Cup); Rankings: USCHO.com Top 20 Poll; updated March 9, 2015

== Bracket ==
Teams are reseeded after the First Round and Quarterfinals

First Round; March 6–8
5	Dartmouth	3	2	–
12	Princeton	2	0	–
6	Harvard	6	4	–
11	Brown	2	3	–
7	Cornell	2	0	–
10	Union	4	7	–
8	Clarkson	2	5	1
9	Rensselaer	3	0	3

Quarterfinals; March 13–15
1	Quinnipiac	4***	2	3
10	Union	3	3	1
2	St. Lawrence	1	5	–
9	Rensselaer	0	1	–
3	Yale	2	2	2
6	Harvard	3	0	3**
4	Colgate	3	3	–
5	Dartmouth	1	2	–

Semifinals; March 20
1	Quinnipiac	2
6	Harvard	5
2	St. Lawrence	3
4	Colgate	4*

Championship; March 21
4	Colgate	2
6	Harvard	4

Note: * denotes overtime period(s)

== Results ==
=== First round ===
==== (5) Dartmouth vs. (12) Princeton ====
March 6	Dartmouth	3 – 2	Princeton	Thompson Arena	Recap
No scoring		First period	06:00 – Matt Nelson (Siiro)
(Bligh, Mosey) Tyler Sikura – 11:14 (Schierhorn, Patterson) Eric Robinson – PP – 12:00		Second period	No scoring
(McNally, Pinkston) Eric Neiley – GW – 18:33		Third period	08:53 – Garrett Skrbich (Liss, Robinson)
( 22 saves / 24 shots ) James Kruger		Goalie stats	Colton Phinney ( 23 saves / 26 shots )

March 7	Dartmouth	2 – 0	Princeton	Thompson Arena	Recap
No scoring		First period	No scoring
(Robinson, Sikura) Brad Schierhorn – GW – 16:59		Second period	No scoring
(McNally, Simpson) Eric Robinson – EN – 19:55		Third period	No scoring
( 17 saves / 17 shots ) James Kruger		Goalie stats	Colton Phinney ( 30 saves / 31 shots )

Dartmouth won series 2–0

==== (6) Harvard vs. (11) Brown ====
March 6	Harvard	6 – 2	Brown	Bright Hockey Center	Recap
(Vesey, Kerfoot) Kyle Criscuolo – PP – 03:57 (Esposito) Colin Blackwell – 12:33		First period	No scoring
(Hart, Criscuolo) Jimmy Vesey – GW – 03:23 (Esposito, Malone) Jake Horton – 04:03		Second period	11:17 – PP – Matt Lorito (Lamacchia, Naclerio)
(Esposito, Malone) Colin Blackwell – 09:08 (Criscuolo, Anderson) Jimmy Vesey – 14:15		Third period	16:54 – Nick Lappin (Lorito)
( 28 saves / 30 shots ) Steve Michalek		Goalie stats	Tim Ernst ( 13 saves / 17 shots ) Tyler Steel ( 17 saves / 19 shots )

March 7	Harvard	4 – 3	Brown	Bright Hockey Center	Recap
(Criscuolo) Jimmy Vesey – 07:51 (Vesey) Kyle Criscuolo – 09:48 (Criscuolo, Vesey) Brian Hart – 17:52		First period	02:23 – Nick Lappin (Naclerio)
(Malone, Esposito) Colin Blackwell – GW – 01:07		Second period	13:34 – Davey Middleton (Lappin, Pryzbek)
No scoring		Third period	11:07 – Nick Lappin (Naclerio)
( 24 saves / 27 shots ) Steve Michalek		Goalie stats	Tim Ernst ( 24 saves / 28 shots )

Harvard won series 2–0

==== (7) Cornell vs. (10) Union ====
March 6	Cornell	2 – 4	Union	Lynah Rink	Recap
No scoring		First period	No scoring
No scoring		Second period	07:36 – Max Novak (DeSimone, Taylor); 14:07 – Matt Wilkins (Vecchione); 16:39 – GW – Daniel Ciampini (Novak, Scarfo)
(Bardreau, Ryan) Christian Hilbrich – PP – 13:07 (Bliss, Kubiak) Matt Buckles – EA – 19:30		Third period	8:41 – SH – Mike Vecchione (unassisted)
( 19 saves / 23 shots ) Mitch Gillam ( 2 saves / 2 shots ) Hayden Stewart		Goalie stats	Colin Stevens ( 28 saves / 30 shots )

March 7	Cornell	0 – 7	Union	Lynah Rink	Recap
No scoring		First period	09:38 – GW – Spencer Foo (Wilkins, Vecchione); 11:02 – Michael Pontarelli (Coatta, Bennett); 16:02 – 5x3 – Eli Lichtenwald (Ciampini, Taylor)
No scoring		Second period	05:45 – Mike Vecchione (Wilkins, Light); 16:01 – PP – Spencer Foo (Pontarelli, Wilkins)
No scoring		Third period	08:36 – PP – Matt Wilkins (Gingras, Taylor); 19:03 – Sam Coatta (Hynes)
( 15 saves / 19 shots ) Mitch Gillam ( 5 saves / 8 shots ) Hayden Stewart		Goalie stats	Colin Stevens ( 29 saves / 29 shots )

Union won series 2–0

==== (8) Clarkson vs. (9) Rensselaer ====
March 6	Clarkson	2 – 3	Rensselaer	Cheel Arena	Recap
No scoring		First period	No scoring
(Zarbo, Amorosa) Pat Megannety – 04:30		Second period	09:18 – Miloš Bubela (Schroeder, Curadi)
(Di Nallo, Fossen) Brett Gervais – EA – 19:49		Third period	01:25 – Mark Miller (Bell); 16:50 – GW – Miloš Bubela (unassisted)
( 14 saves / 17 shots ) Greg Lewis		Goalie stats	Jason Kasdorf ( 36 saves / 38 shots )

March 7	Clarkson	5 – 0	Rensselaer	Cheel Arena	Recap
(Asselin) Jeff Di Nallo – GW – 01:35		First period	No scoring
(Amorosa, Megannety) Joe Zarbo – 01:17 (Fossen, Vigneault) Troy Josephs – 04:25		Second period	No scoring
(Josephs, Fossen) Sam Vigneault – 00:26 (Megannety, Gervais) Joe Zarbo – 01:35		Third period	No scoring
( 24 saves / 24 shots ) Steve Perry		Goalie stats	Jason Kasdorf ( 24 saves / 28 shots ) Scott Diebold ( 3 saves / 4 shots )

March 8	Clarkson	1 – 3	Rensselaer	Cheel Arena	Recap
No scoring		First period	No scoring
No scoring		Second period	07:45 – Mark Miller (McGowan, DeVito); 08:05 – GW – Zach Schroeder (Bubela, Liljegren); 16:12 – Jimmy DeVito (Bourbonnais, Wood)
(Vigneault, Fossen) Joe Zarbo – EA – 17:06		Third period	No scoring
( 7 saves / 10 shots ) Steve Perry ( 10 saves / 10 shots ) Greg Lewis		Goalie stats	Jason Kasdorf ( 33 saves / 34 shots )

Rensselaer won series 2–1

=== Quarterfinals ===
==== (1) Quinnipiac vs. (10) Union ====
March 13	Quinnipiac	4 – 3	3OT	Union	TD Bank Sports Center	Recap
No scoring		First period		09:42 – PP – Matt Wilkins (DeSimone, Foo); 15:17 – Mike Vecchione (Wilkins, Gingras)
(Agosta, Smith) Tim Clifton – PP – 15:04		Second period		No scoring
(Agosta, Toews) Sam Anas – EA – 18:34 (Toews, Peca) Sam Anas – PP – 19:22		Third period		04:58 – Michael Pontarelli (Foo, Vecchione)
(Federico, C. Clifton) Alex Miner-Barron – GW – 06:32		Third overtime period		No scoring
( 31 saves / 34 shots ) Michael Garteig		Goalie stats		Colin Stevens ( 46 saves / 50 shots )

March 14	Quinnipiac	2 – 3	Union	TD Bank Sports Center	Recap
(St. Denis) Sam Anas – 03:46		First period	04:13 – Ryan Scarfo (Brassard, Ciampini)
(Pieper, McKernan) Matthew Peca – 06:18		Second period	13:28 – Max Novak (Scarfo, Ciampini)
No scoring		Third period	16:07 – GW – Michael Pontarelli (Cruice, Lichtenwald)
( 25 saves / 28 shots ) Michael Garteig		Goalie stats	Colin Stevens ( 31 saves / 33 shots )

March 15	Quinnipiac	3 – 1	Union	TD Bank Sports Center	Recap
(Smith, Federico) Soren Jonzzon – 19:14		First period	No scoring
(Smith, Agosta) Soren Jonzzon – GW – 04:10		Second period	07:19 – Matt Wilkins (Vasaturo, Vecchione)
(St. Denis, Smith) Matthew Peca – SH EN – 19:22		Third period	No scoring
( 37 saves / 38 shots ) Michael Garteig		Goalie stats	Colin Stevens ( 22 saves / 24 shots )

Quinnipiac won series 2–1

==== (2) St. Lawrence vs. (9) Rensselaer ====
March 13	St. Lawrence	1 – 0	Rensselaer	Appleton Arena	Recap
No scoring		First period	No scoring
No scoring		Second period	No scoring
(Hudson, Hagen) Chris Martin – GW – 19:08		Third period	No scoring
( 27 saves / 27 shots ) Kyle Hayton		Goalie stats	Jason Kasdorf ( 33 saves / 34 shots )

March 14	St. Lawrence	5 – 1	Rensselaer	Appleton Arena	Recap
(Gluchowski) Mike Marnell – 05:45 (Martin, Hagen) Alexander Dahl – GW – 06:50		First period	No scoring
(Martin) Mike Marnell – 18:09		Second period	02:02 – Mark Miller (Bradley, Nanne)
(McGovern) Christian Horn – 16:58 (Marnell, Gluchowski) Brian Ward – EN – 19:46		Third period	No scoring
( 38 saves / 39 shots ) Kyle Hayton		Goalie stats	Jason Kasdorf ( 22 saves / 26 shots )

St. Lawrence won series 2–0

==== (3) Yale vs. (6) Harvard ====
March 13	Yale	2 – 3	Harvard	Ingalls Rink	Recap
No scoring		First period	No scoring
(Cooper, O'Gara) Cody Learned – 19:01		Second period	01:12 – Sean Malone (Esposito); 03:55 – Alexander Kerfoot (Criscuolo, Vesey)
(O'Gara, DiChiara) Nate Repensky – PP – 01:53		Third period	17:34 – GW – Jimmy Vesey (Kerfoot)
( 27 saves / 30 shots ) Alex Lyon		Goalie stats	Steve Michalek ( 19 saves / 21 shots )

March 14	Yale	2 – 0	Harvard	Ingalls Rink	Recap
No scoring		First period	No scoring
(DiChiara, O'Gara) Mitch Witek – GW - 03:43		Second period	No scoring
(unassisted) Trent Ruffolo – PP EN – 19:33		Third period	No scoring
( 24 saves / 24 shots ) Alex Lyon		Goalie stats	Steve Michalek ( 20 saves / 21 shots )

March 15	Yale	2 – 3	2OT	Harvard	Ingalls Rink	Recap
(Cooper, DiChiara) Cody Learned – 10:22		First period		10:01 – Tyler Moy (Hart, Horton)
(Repensky, Cooper) Frankie DiChiara – PP – 11:58		Second period		No scoring
No scoring		Third period		16:26 – Patrick McNally (Blackwell, Bergin)
No scoring		Second overtime period		16:46 – GW – Jimmy Vesey (Kerfoot, McNally)
( 39 saves / 42 shots ) Alex Lyon		Goalie stats		Steve Michalek ( 40 saves / 42 shots )

Harvard won series 2–1

==== (4) Colgate vs. (5) Dartmouth ====
March 13	Colgate	3 – 1	Dartmouth	Starr Rink	Recap
No scoring		First period	No scoring
(Tys. Spink, Kulevich) Tylor Spink – 16:38		Second period	16:24 – Jack Barre (Mosey, Simpson)
(Gentzler) John Lidgett – GW – 05:13 (Kulevich) Darcy Murphy – EN – 19:51		Third period	No scoring
( 21 saves / 22 shots ) Charlie Finn		Goalie stats	James Kruger ( 22 saves / 24 shots )

March 14	Colgate	3 – 2	Dartmouth	Starr Rink	Recap
(Tyl. Spink, Tys. Spink) Spiro Goulakos – PP – 14:21 (Tyl. Spink) Kyle Baun – 16:33		First period	No scoring
No scoring		Second period	01:50 – 4x4 – Tyler Sikura (Hartley); 08:20 – Nick Bligh (Bullock, Beamish)
(Kulevich) Mike Borkowski – GW – 02:53		Third period	No scoring
( 32 saves / 34 shots ) Charlie Finn		Goalie stats	James Kruger ( 20 saves / 23 shots )

Colgate won series 2–0

=== Semifinals ===
==== (1) Quinnipiac vs. (6) Harvard ====
March 20	Quinnipiac	2 – 5	Harvard	Herb Brooks Arena	Recap
No scoring		First period	00:30 – Jimmy Vesey (Criscuolo, Kerfoot); 14:55 – PP – Colin Blackwell (unassisted); 15:28 – GW – Tyler Moy (Anderson, Sherman)
(Miner-Barron, Agosta) Travis St. Denis – SH – 09:05 (Peca, Smith) Soren Jonzzon – 15:00		Second period	No scoring
No scoring		Third period	18:24 – EN – Jimmy Vesey (Kerfoot); 19:01 – EN – Sean Malone (Anderson, Everson)
( 23 saves / 26 shots ) Michael Garteig ( 3 saves / 3 shots ) Sean Lawrence		Goalie stats	Steve Michalek ( 20 saves / 22 shots )

==== (2) St. Lawrence vs. (4) Colgate ====
March 20	St. Lawrence	3 – 4	OT	Colgate	Herb Brooks Arena	Recap
No scoring		First period		03:21 – Darcy Murphy (Borkowski, Wilson)
(Sullivan, Doherty) Mike Marnell – 01:04 (Eden, Thompson) Eric Sweetman – PP – 17:23		Second period		05:46 – Darcy Murphy (Wilson, Borkowski)
(Ward, Hughes) Gavin Bayreuther – EA – 18:38		Third period		02:33 – Joe Wilson (Murphy, Borkowski)
No scoring		First overtime period		09:34 – GW – Mike Borkowski (Lough, Murphy)
( 27 saves / 31 shots ) Kyle Hayton		Goalie stats		Charlie Finn ( 29 saves / 32 shots )

=== Championship ===
==== (4) Colgate vs. (6) Harvard ====
March 21	Colgate	2 – 4	Harvard	Herb Brooks Arena	Recap
(Borkowski, Wilson) Darcy Murphy – 15:19		First period	12:22 – Jimmy Vesey (Criscuolo, McNally)
No scoring		Second period	01:29 – PP – Jimmy Vesey (Kerfoot, McNally); 08:16 – PP GW – Patrick McNally (Moy, Criscuolo)
(Gentzler) John Lidgett – 12:17		Third period	19:04 – EN – Colin Blackwell (Kerfoot)
( 19 saves / 22 shots ) Charlie Finn		Goalie stats	Steve Michalek ( 30 saves / 32 shots )

== Tournament awards ==
=== All-Tournament Team ===
- F Jimmy Vesey* (Harvard)
- F Mike Borkowski (Colgate)
- F Darcy Murphy (Colgate)
- D Spiro Goulakos (Colgate)
- D Patrick McNally (Harvard)
- G Steve Michalek (Harvard)

* Most Outstanding Player(s)
