= Mat Bodie =

Canadian ice hockey player (born 1990)

Mathew Bodie
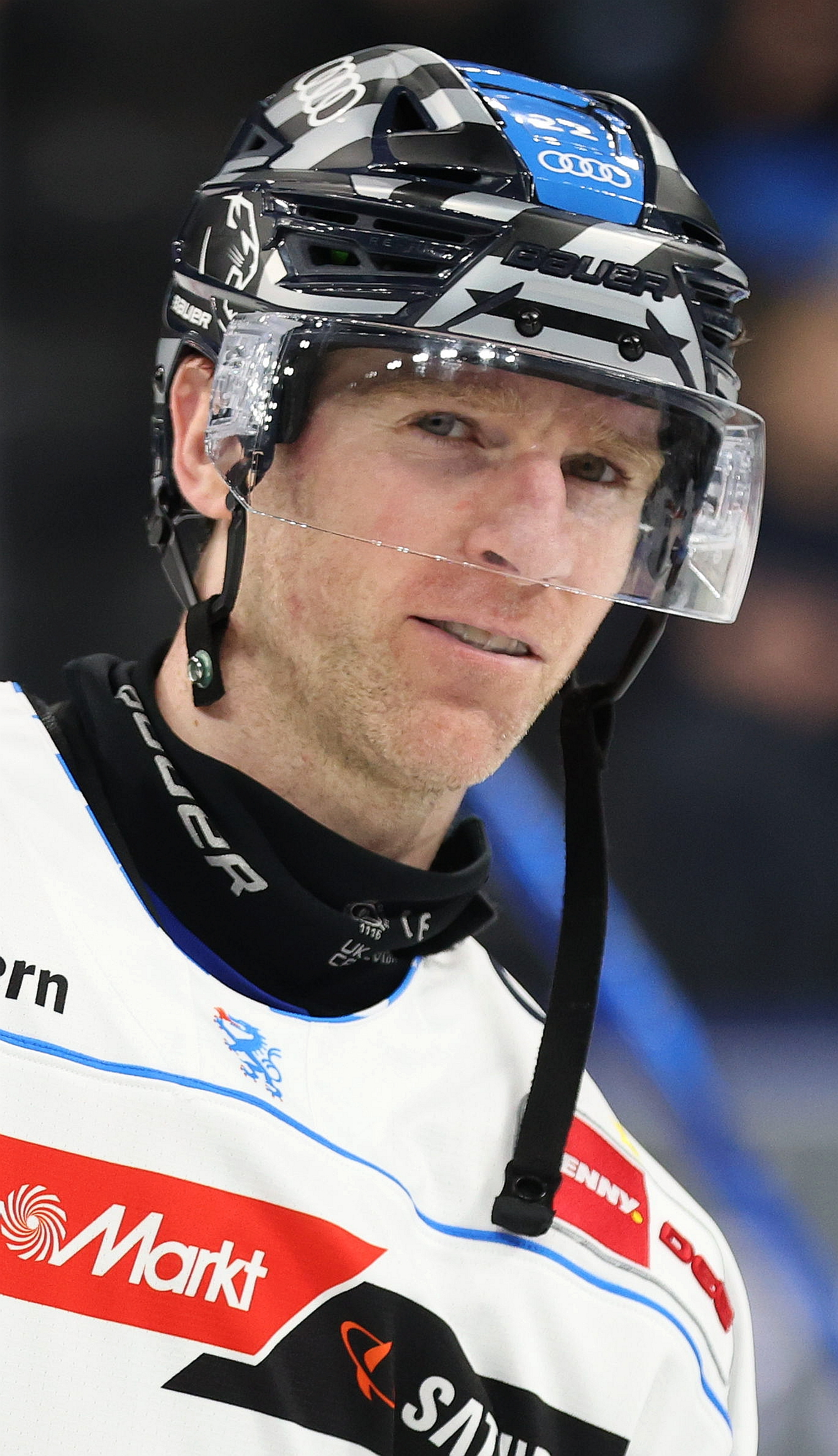
- Bodie with the ERC Ingolstadt in 2024
- Born: March 7, 1990 (age 36) East St. Paul, Manitoba, Canada
- Height: 6 ft 0 in (183 cm)
- Weight: 175 lb (79 kg; 12 st 7 lb)
- Position: Defence
- Shot: Left
- DEL team Former teams: ERC Ingolstadt; Hartford Wolf Pack; Rochester Americans; Syracuse Crunch; Torpedo Nizhny Novgorod; Växjö Lakers; IK Oskarshamn
- NHL draft: Undrafted
- Playing career: 2014–2025

Mathew Bodie (born March 7, 1990) is a former Canadian professional ice hockey defenceman who last played for ERC Ingolstadt of the Deutsche Eishockey Liga (DEL).

== Playing career ==
As a member of the Winnipeg Thrashers midget hockey team, he was named the Most Valuable player and top defenceman at the 2008 Telus Cup. The Thrashers captured the silver medal.

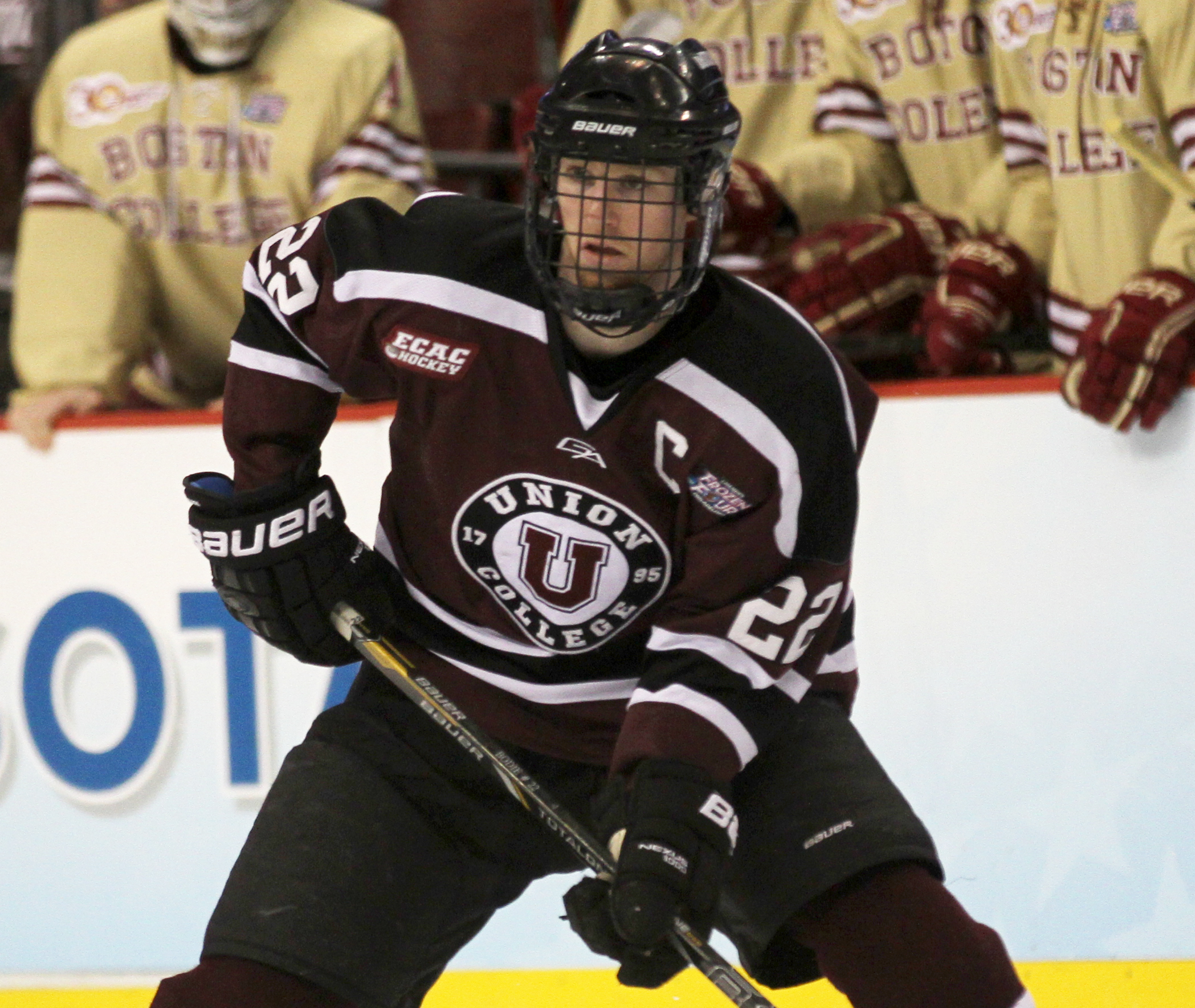
Bodie playing for the Union Dutchmen during the 2014 Frozen Four.

Bodie played collegiate hockey for the Union Dutchmen in the NCAA Men's Division I ECAC Hockey conference. In his sophomore year, Bodie's outstanding play was recognized when he was selected to the 2011–12 ECAC Hockey First Team. He captained the team as a senior, leading them to win the 2014 NCAA Division I men's ice hockey tournament, the first championship win in school history.

Undrafted, Bodie was signed by the New York Rangers to a one-year entry-level contract on April 15, 2014, after Union won the NCAA Championship.

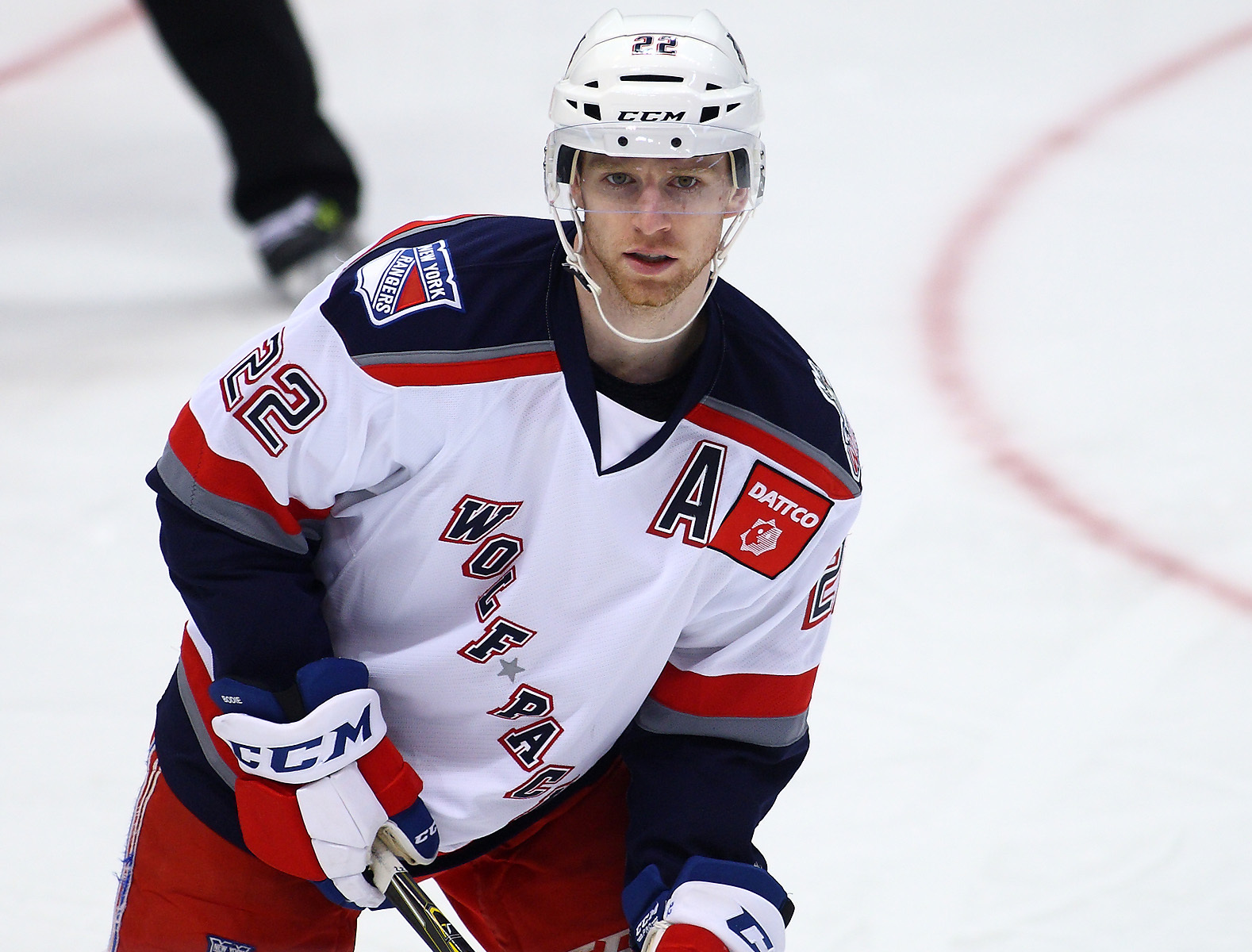
Bodie playing for the Hartford Wolf Pack in October 2012

On April 20, 2016, Bodie was recalled by the New York Rangers from the team's AHL affiliate, the Hartford Wolf Pack, but he did not play for the team.

During the 2016–17 season, while captaining the Wolf Pack, Bodie was dealt by the Rangers at the trade deadline to the Buffalo Sabres in exchange for Daniel Catenacci on February 28, 2017. He played out the season in the AHL with the Rochester Americans, producing 9 points in 17 games.

On July 1, 2017, Bodie as a free agent signed to a one-year, two-way contract with the Tampa Bay Lightning. After attending the Lightning's 2017 training camp, he was assigned to AHL affiliate, the Syracuse Crunch for the duration of the 2017–18 season. Assuming a role as the Crunch's top pairing defenseman, Bodie responded with a professional high 31 assists and 37 points in 74 games.

As a free agent from the Lightning, Bodie opted to halt his North American career, agreeing to an initial one-year deal with Russian club, Torpedo Nizhny Novgorod of the Kontinental Hockey League (KHL) on July 20, 2018. In his debut season in Russia in 2018–19, Bodie recorded 3 goals and 16 points in 39 games from the blueline with Torpedo.

On June 14, 2019, Bodie as a free agent opted to sign in Sweden, agreeing to a one-year contract with the Växjö Lakers of the Swedish Hockey League (SHL). Mid-way into the 2019–20 season, Bodie collected 1 goal and 3 points in 17 games with Växjö, before he transferred to fellow SHL outfit, IK Oskarshamn, for the remainder of the campaign on November 25, 2019. Bodie in an increased role with Oskarshamn, boosted his offensive totals with 1 goal and 10 points in 27 regular season games.

As a free agent from IK Oskarshamn, Bodie extended his European career in agreeing to a one-year contract with German club, ERC Ingolstadt of the DEL, on November 12, 2020.

== Career statistics ==
			Regular season					Playoffs
Season	Team	League	GP	G	A	Pts	PIM	GP	G	A	Pts	PIM
2008–09	Powell River Kings	BCHL	53	1	41	42	41	18	2	12	14	20
2009–10	Powell River Kings	BCHL	51	8	34	42	37	23	9	22	31	23
2010–11	Union College	ECAC	40	6	26	32	18	—	—	—	—	—
2011–12	Union College	ECAC	39	8	21	29	32	—	—	—	—	—
2012–13	Union College	ECAC	35	6	18	24	32	—	—	—	—	—
2013–14	Union College	ECAC	40	8	31	39	57	—	—	—	—	—
2014–15	Hartford Wolf Pack	AHL	75	5	27	32	42	15	3	4	7	6
2015–16	Hartford Wolf Pack	AHL	76	7	29	36	38	—	—	—	—	—
2016–17	Hartford Wolf Pack	AHL	45	8	22	30	47	—	—	—	—	—
2016–17	Rochester Americans	AHL	17	2	7	9	8	—	—	—	—	—
2017–18	Syracuse Crunch	AHL	74	6	31	37	36	5	0	2	2	6
2018–19	Torpedo Nizhny Novgorod	KHL	39	3	13	16	32	—	—	—	—	—
2019–20	Växjö Lakers	SHL	17	1	2	3	8	—	—	—	—	—
2019–20	IK Oskarshamn	SHL	27	1	9	10	10	—	—	—	—	—
2020–21	ERC Ingolstadt	DEL	30	3	19	22	42	5	0	1	1	4
2021–22	ERC Ingolstadt	DEL	39	3	16	19	44	—	—	—	—	—
2022–23	ERC Ingolstadt	DEL	49	4	21	25	48	15	0	10	10	25
2023–24	ERC Ingolstadt	DEL	50	4	26	30	47	7	1	4	5	10
2024–25	ERC Ingolstadt	DEL	40	2	18	20	42	12	1	5	6	10
AHL totals			287	28	116	144	171	20	3	6	9	12
DEL totals			208	16	100	116	223	39	2	20	22	49

== Awards and honours ==
Medal record

Ice hockey

Representing Canada West

World Junior A Challenge
Silver medal – second place	2009 Summerside	

Award	Year
Telus Cup
Most Valuable Player	2007–08
Top Defenceman	2007–08
College
ECAC Hockey Rookie Team	2010–11
All-ECAC Hockey First Team	2011–12
AHCA East Second-Team All-American	2011–12
All-ECAC Hockey Third Team	2012–13
All-ECAC Hockey First Team	2013–14
AHCA East First-Team All-American	2013–14
ECAC Hockey All-Tournament Team	2014
NCAA All-Tournament Team	2014
