= Terry Campbell =

Canadian-born German ice hockey player

- Born: July 1, 1968 (age 56); North York, Ontario, Canada
- Height: 5 ft 8 in (173 cm)
- Weight: 172 lb (78 kg; 12 st 4 lb)
- Position: Centre
- Shot: Right
- Played for: ESG Sachsen Weißwasser; Augsburger Panther; Essen Mosquitoes; Iserlohn Roosters; ERC Ingolstadt
- National team: Germany
- NHL draft: Undrafted
- Playing career: 1992–2011

Terry Campbell (born July 1, 1968) is a Canadian-born German former professional ice hockey player.

Prior to turning professional, Campbell attended Union College where he played three seasons (1987–1991) of college hockey with the Union Garnet Chargers men's ice hockey team.

Campbell has played 260 games in the Deutsche Eishockey Liga. In 1999 he played with the Germany men's national ice hockey team, competing in the 'B' Pool at the 1999 Men's World Ice Hockey Championships.
