= Jimmy Vesey =

American ice hockey player (born 1993)

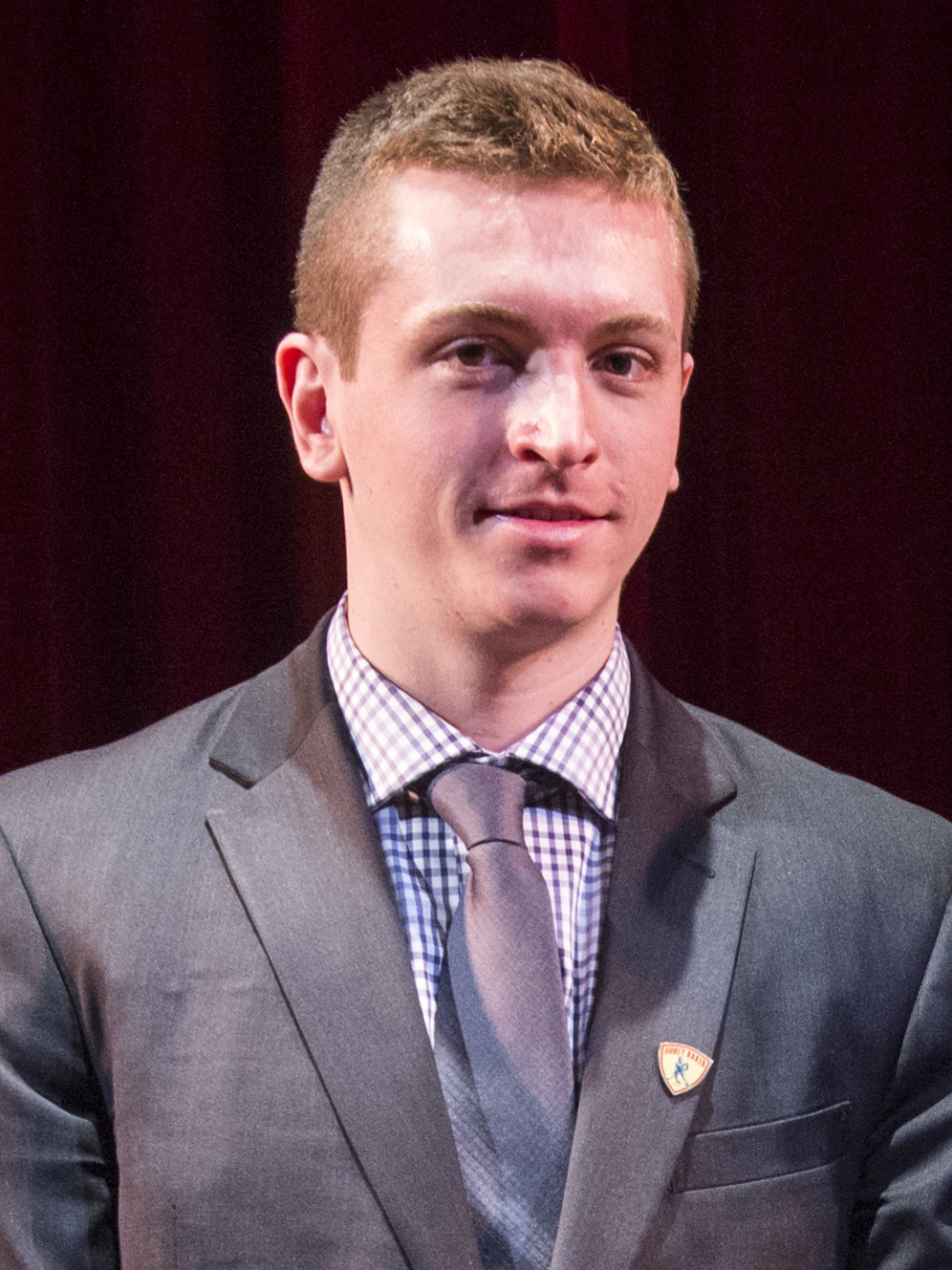
- Vesey in 2016
- Born: May 26, 1993 (age 33) Boston, Massachusetts, U.S.
- Height: 6 ft 3 in (191 cm)
- Weight: 207 lb (94 kg; 14 st 11 lb)
- Position: Left wing
- Shoots: Left
- NL team Former teams: Genève-Servette HC; New York Rangers; Buffalo Sabres; Toronto Maple Leafs; Vancouver Canucks; New Jersey Devils; Colorado Avalanche
- National team: United States
- NHL draft: 66th overall, 2012; Nashville Predators
- Playing career: 2016–present

James Michael Vesey (born May 26, 1993) is an American professional ice hockey left winger for Genève-Servette HC of the National League (NL). He was selected by the Nashville Predators in the third round, 66th overall, of the 2012 NHL entry draft. Vesey attended Harvard and won the Hobey Baker Award in 2016. After exercising his right to unrestricted free agency and choosing not to sign with Nashville, Vesey signed with the New York Rangers in 2016, with whom he played three seasons, before spending the next three seasons with the Buffalo Sabres, Toronto Maple Leafs, Vancouver Canucks, and New Jersey Devils. He re-signed with the Rangers in 2022, before being traded to the Colorado Avalanche in 2025.

== Playing career ==
=== College ===
Vesey played four years with Harvard University in the NCAA. The North Reading, Massachusetts native finished his collegiate career with 144 points (80 goals, 64 assists) in 128 games and was named ECAC Player of the Year after the 2014–15 season.

In his junior year, Vesey's outstanding play was rewarded with a top-ten nomination for the Hobey Baker Award. On April 2, 2015, Vesey was named to the Hobey Hat Trick, the 3 finalists for the award, along with University of North Dakota's Zane McIntyre and Boston University's Jack Eichel, with Eichel going on to win the award. In 2016, Vesey once again qualified for the Hobey Hat Trick, along with Michigan Wolverine's Kyle Connor and Boston College's Thatcher Demko, this time going on to win the Hobey Baker Award on April 8, 2016.

=== Professional ===
Vesey was selected by the Nashville Predators in the 3rd round with the 66th overall selection of the 2012 NHL entry draft. Vesey was good enough for Nashville general manager David Poile to guarantee the senior a roster spot for the end of the 2015–16 regular season and playoffs. But Vesey informed the Predators he was not interested in signing. Vesey wanted to choose his destination, which any collegian can do four years out from when they are drafted.

Vesey's decision came as a blow to the Predators' organization. However, it was also within the bounds of the NHL's Collective Bargaining Agreement, which gives teams four years to sign college draftees and thus allows for the drafted player to move to free agency shortly after his senior year. On March 30, 2016, almost five months before he was officially set to become a free agent, it was reported that Vesey would sign with his hometown team, the Boston Bruins. However, these reports did not end up being true.

On June 20, 2016, the Buffalo Sabres acquired Vesey's rights from the Predators in exchange for a third-round pick in the 2016 NHL entry draft. The deal was made in order to give the Sabres an extra few weeks of exclusive negotiating rights with Vesey before he became a free agent. Despite this, Vesey's agent informed ESPN that he had still intended to become a free agent. While discussions with the Sabres continued, a deal was not struck and in accordance with the NHL CBA, Vesey became an unrestricted free agent on August 16.

In the two days following his free agency, Vesey met with seven NHL teams. Five more teams requested to meet with Vesey, but were denied. (Note: The seven teams Vesey granted meetings to were the Boston Bruins, Chicago Blackhawks, New Jersey Devils, New York Islanders, New York Rangers, Pittsburgh Penguins and the Toronto Maple Leafs. The five teams Vesey denied meetings to were the Carolina Hurricanes, Columbus Blue Jackets, Detroit Red Wings, Montreal Canadiens and Philadelphia Flyers.)

==== New York Rangers (2016–2019) ====
On August 20, 2016, Vesey signed with the New York Rangers. After attending the training camp, Vesey received the Lars-Erik Sjöberg Award, which is given to the best Rangers' rookie in the camp. On October 17, 2016, Vesey scored his first NHL goal in a 7–4 win over the San Jose Sharks. He finished his rookie season with 11 goals, 27 points and a -13 plus/minus rating.

In a November 8, 2017 game against the Boston Bruins, Vesey scored two goals in 29 seconds, the fastest pair of goals scored by a Rangers player since Jaromír Jágr did so in 26 seconds in 2006. The Rangers eventually won the game 4–2. Adding a goal to his rookie totals, he finished the campaign with 17 goals, 28 points and a -18 rating.

On March 12, 2018, Vesey recorded his first career NHL hat trick in a game against the Carolina Hurricanes, which the Rangers won 6–3. He improved only slightly in his third season, finishing with 17 goals, 35 points and a -6 rating.

==== Buffalo Sabres (2019–2020) ====
On July 1, 2019, the Sabres again acquired Vesey in exchange for another third-round draft selection through a trade with the Rangers. This marks the first time in professional sports that a player was traded to the same team with the same compensation twice. In the 2019–20 season, Vesey was unable to add the offensive punch expected for the Sabres, posting a career low 9 goals and 20 points in 64 games, before the remainder of the regular season was cancelled due to the COVID-19 pandemic.

==== Toronto Maple Leafs and Vancouver Canucks (2020–2021) ====
As a free agent from the Sabres, Vesey was signed to a one-year, $900,000 contract by the Toronto Maple Leafs on October 11, 2020. In the pandemic-delayed 2020–21 season, Vesey initially appeared for the Maple Leafs on the second line with John Tavares and William Nylander before shifting into in a bottom-six forward role, contributing with 5 goals and 7 points through 30 games.

On March 17, 2021, Vesey was claimed off waivers from Toronto by the Vancouver Canucks, marking his fourth NHL club in three seasons. Vesey made 20 regular season appearances with the Canucks, collecting 3 assists, as the team missed out on the playoffs.

==== New Jersey Devils (2021–2022) ====
As a free agent from the Canucks, on September 14, 2021, Vesey was signed to a professional tryout contract (PTO) by the New Jersey Devils. On October 10, 2021, Vesey signed a one-year, $800,000 contract by the Devils, which marked his fifth NHL club in four seasons. Vesey played 68 games with the Devils, with eight goals.

==== Return to the Rangers (2022–2025) ====
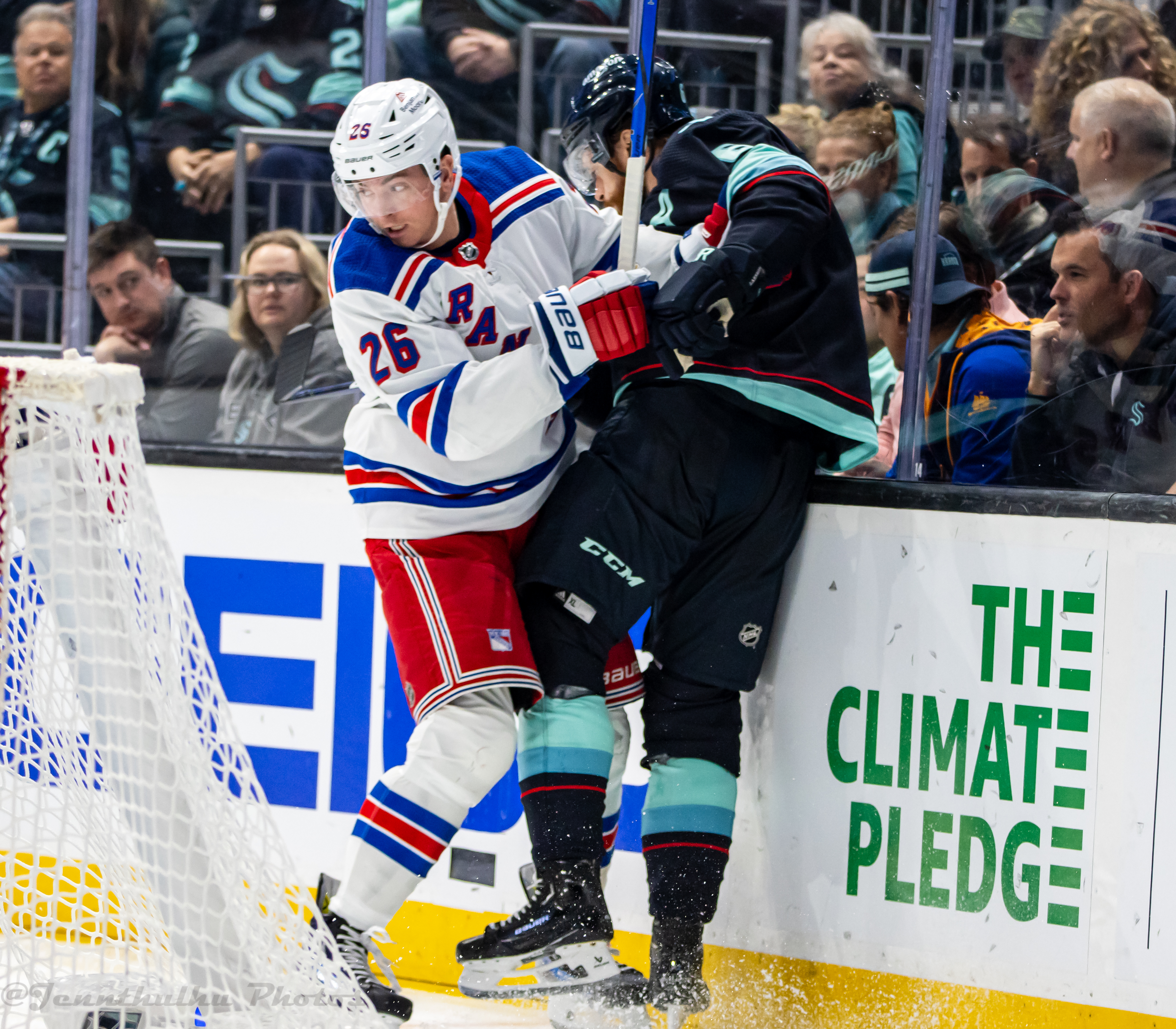
Vesey hitting Adam Larsson of the Seattle Kraken in 2023.

After going unsigned in free agency, Vesey agreed to terms with the Rangers on September 2, 2022. He signed a tryout contract, with the Rangers intending to use him as a defensive forward on their fourth line. On October 9, the Rangers signed Vesey to a one-year contract. On January 4, 2023, he signed a contract extension to stay with the Rangers for another two years.

==== Colorado Avalanche (2025) ====
On March 1, 2025, the Rangers traded Vesey, Hank Kempf, and Ryan Lindgren to the Colorado Avalanche, in exchange for Calvin de Haan, Juuso Pärssinen, and two conditional draft picks in 2025. Utilised in a depth forward role on the Avalanche roster, Vesey made 10 regular season appearances, netting 1 goal and 2 points. He served as a healthy scratch through Colorado's first-round defeat to the Dallas Stars before leaving the club as a free agent.

==== Genève-Servette HC (2025–present) ====
Un-signed over the summer at the NHL level, Vesey opted to sign his first contract abroad in agreeing to a two-year contract with Swiss club, Genève-Servette HC of the NL, on August 4, 2025.

== International play ==
Medal record

Representing United States

Ice hockey

World Championships
Bronze medal – third place	2015 Czech Republic	

World Junior Championships
Gold medal – first place	2013 Russia	

Vesey won a gold medal while playing for the U.S. national junior team at the 2013 World Junior Ice Hockey Championship and took home a bronze medal as part of senior team at the 2015 IIHF World Championship.

== Personal life ==
His father, Jim Vesey, was drafted by the St. Louis Blues in the eighth round of the 1984 NHL entry draft, going on to play 15 games in the National Hockey League; he works as a scout for the Toronto Maple Leafs.

Jimmy's younger brother Nolan was drafted by the Toronto Maple Leafs in the 2014 NHL entry draft. He was traded in June 2018 to the Edmonton Oilers and signed an entry-level contract with them.

Growing up, Vesey was friends with 2012 NHL entry draft pick Matt Grzelcyk. The two first met when they were around the age of six, playing hockey together for a team named the Middlesex Islanders. The Islanders were coached by Vesey's father. They similarly both attended the Belmont Hill School in Belmont, Massachusetts, and played hockey together there.

== Career statistics ==
=== Regular season and playoffs ===
			Regular season					Playoffs
Season	Team	League	GP	G	A	Pts	PIM	GP	G	A	Pts	PIM
2009–10	Belmont Hill School	HS-Prep	30	13	17	30		—	—	—	—	—
2010–11	Belmont Hill School	HS-Prep	32	23	12	35	30	—	—	—	—	—
2011–12	South Shore Kings	EJHL	45	48	43	91	52	6	5	3	8	2
2012–13	Harvard University	ECAC	27	11	7	18	25	—	—	—	—	—
2013–14	Harvard University	ECAC	31	13	9	22	14	—	—	—	—	—
2014–15	Harvard University	ECAC	37	32	26	58	21	—	—	—	—	—
2015–16	Harvard University	ECAC	33	24	22	46	6	—	—	—	—	—
2016–17	New York Rangers	NHL	80	16	11	27	26	12	1	4	5	9
2017–18	New York Rangers	NHL	79	17	11	28	20	—	—	—	—	—
2018–19	New York Rangers	NHL	81	17	18	35	21	—	—	—	—	—
2019–20	Buffalo Sabres	NHL	64	9	11	20	15	—	—	—	—	—
2020–21	Toronto Maple Leafs	NHL	30	5	2	7	4	—	—	—	—	—
2020–21	Vancouver Canucks	NHL	20	0	3	3	6	—	—	—	—	—
2021–22	New Jersey Devils	NHL	68	8	7	15	12	—	—	—	—	—
2022–23	New York Rangers	NHL	81	11	14	25	20	7	0	1	1	10
2023–24	New York Rangers	NHL	80	13	13	26	20	12	1	2	3	2
2024–25	New York Rangers	NHL	33	4	2	6	0	—	—	—	—	—
2024–25	Colorado Avalanche	NHL	10	1	1	2	0	—	—	—	—	—
2025–26	Genève-Servette HC	NL	52	14	21	35	16	12	4	4	8	10
NHL totals			626	101	93	194	144	31	2	7	9	21

=== International ===
Year	Team	Event	Result	GP	G	A	Pts	PIM
2013	United States	WJC	1st place, gold medalist(s)	7	1	4	5	2
2015	United States	WC	3rd place, bronze medalist(s)	9	0	3	3	0
Junior totals				7	1	4	5	2
Senior totals				9	0	3	3	0

== Awards and honors ==
Award	Year	Ref
College
All-ECAC Hockey Rookie Team	2012–13	
Hobey Baker Award top ten finalist	2014–15	
ECAC Player of the Year	2014–15	
All-ECAC First Team	2014–15	
ECAC Player of the Year	2015–16	
All-ECAC First Team	2015–16	
Hobey Baker Award	2015–16	

== Notes ==
Awards and achievements
Preceded by Jack Eichel	Hobey Baker Award; 2015–16	Succeeded by Will Butcher
Preceded by Greg Carey/Shayne Gostisbehere	ECAC Hockey Player of the Year; 2014–15, 2015–16	Succeeded by Mike Vecchione
Preceded by Daniel Carr	ECAC Hockey Tournament MOP; 2015	Succeeded by Connor Clifton
