= 2014 NCAA Division I men's ice hockey tournament =

- 2014 Frozen Four logo
- Teams: 16
- Finals site: Wells Fargo Center, Philadelphia, Pennsylvania
- Champions: Union Dutchmen (1st title)
- Runner-up: Minnesota Golden Gophers (12th title game)
- Semifinalists: Boston College Eagles (24th Frozen Four); University of North Dakota (20th Frozen Four)
- Winning coach: Rick Bennett (1st title)
- MOP: Shayne Gostisbehere (Union)
- Attendance: 18,742 (Championship); 53,364 (Frozen Four); 135,453 (Tournament)

The 2014 NCAA Division I men's ice hockey tournament was the national championship tournament for men's college ice hockey in the United States in 2014. The tournament involved 16 teams in single-elimination play to determine the national champion at the Division I level of the NCAA, the highest level of competition in college hockey. The tournament's Frozen Four – the semifinals and finals – was hosted by ECAC Hockey at the Wells Fargo Center in Philadelphia.

Union defeated Minnesota 7–4 to win the program's first NCAA title.

== Tournament procedure ==
2014 Regionals (blue) and Frozen Four (red)

The tournament will consist of four groups of four teams in regional brackets. The four regionals are officially named after their geographic areas. The following are the sites for the 2014 regionals:

March 28 and 29
East Regional, Webster Bank Arena – Bridgeport, Connecticut (Hosts: Yale University and Fairfield University)
Midwest Regional, US Bank Arena – Cincinnati (Host: Miami University)
March 29 and 30
Northeast Regional, DCU Center – Worcester, Massachusetts (Host: College of the Holy Cross)
West Regional, Xcel Energy Center – Saint Paul, Minnesota (Host: University of Minnesota)

The winner of each regional will advance to the Frozen Four:

April 10 and 12
Wells Fargo Center – Philadelphia (Host: ECAC Hockey)

== Qualifying teams ==
The at-large bids and seeding for each team in the tournament were announced on March 23. Hockey East had five teams receive a berth in the tournament, ECAC Hockey and the National Collegiate Hockey Conference (NCHC) each had three teams receive a berth, the Western Collegiate Hockey Association (WCHA) and Big Ten Conference each had two teams receive a berth, and one team from Atlantic Hockey received a berth.

West Regional – St. Paul							Northeast Regional – Worcester						
Seed	School	Conference	Record	Berth type	Appearance	Last bid	Seed	School	Conference	Record	Berth type	Appearance	Last bid
1	Minnesota (1)	Big Ten	25–6–6	At-large bid	35th	2013	1	Boston College (2)	Hockey East	26–7–4	At-large bid	33rd	2013
2	Notre Dame	Hockey East	23–14–2	At-large bid	7th	2013	2	UMass Lowell	Hockey East	25–10–4	Tournament champion	6th	2013
3	St. Cloud State	NCHC	21–10–5	At-large bid	10th	2013	3	Minnesota State	WCHA	26–13–1	Tournament champion	3rd	2013
4	Robert Morris	Atlantic Hockey	19–17–5	Tournament champion	1st	Never	4	Denver	NCHC	20–15–6	Tournament champion	24th	2013
Midwest Regional – Cincinnati							East Regional – Bridgeport						
Seed	School	Conference	Record	Berth type	Appearance	Last bid	Seed	School	Conference	Record	Berth type	Appearance	Last bid
1	Wisconsin (4)	Big Ten	24–10–2	Tournament champion	26th	2013	1	Union (3)	ECAC Hockey	28–6–4	Tournament champion	4th	2013
2	Ferris State	WCHA	28–10–3	At-large bid	3rd	2012	2	Quinnipiac	ECAC Hockey	24–9–6	At-large bid	3rd	2013
3	Colgate	ECAC Hockey	20–13–5	At-large bid	5th	2005	3	Providence	Hockey East	21–10–6	At-large bid	10th	2001
4	North Dakota	NCHC	23–13–3	At-large bid	29th	2013	4	Vermont	Hockey East	20–14–3	At-large bid	6th	2010

Number in parentheses denotes overall seed in the tournament.

== Tournament bracket ==
First round March 28–29
1	Minnesota (1)	7
4	Robert Morris	3
Saint Paul, Minnesota – Sat/Sun
2	Notre Dame	3
3	St. Cloud State	4*
1	Wisconsin (4)	2
4	North Dakota	5
Cincinnati – Fri/Sat
2	Ferris State	1
3	Colgate	0
1	Boston College (2)	6
4	Denver	2
Worcester, Massachusetts – Sat/Sun
2	UMass Lowell	2
3	Minnesota State	1
1	Union (3)	5
4	Vermont	2
Bridgeport, Connecticut – Fri/Sat
2	Quinnipiac	0
3	Providence	4

Second round March 29–30
1	Minnesota	4
3	St. Cloud State	0
4	North Dakota	2**
2	Ferris State	1
1	Boston College	4
2	UMass Lowell	3
1	Union	3
3	Providence	1

Semifinals; April 10
W1	Minnesota	2
MW4	North Dakota	1
NE1	Boston College	4
E1	Union	5

Championship; April 12
W1	Minnesota	4
E1	Union	7

Note: * denotes overtime period(s)
All times are Eastern Daylight Time (UTC−4).

== Results ==
=== West Region – Saint Paul, Minnesota ===
==== Regional semifinal ====
March 29, 2014; 5:30 pm ESPN2	(4) Robert Morris	3 – 7 (0–3, 2–1, 1–3)	(1) Minnesota	Xcel Energy Center, Saint Paul; Attendance: 9,232

Game reference

Dalton Izyk
Brandon Lane
Goalies
Adam Wilcox
Referees:
Butch Mousseaux
Peter Friesema
Linesmen:
Paul Tunison
Eric Froberg

	0–1	16:13 – Nate Condon (8) (Brodzinski)
	0–2	17:50 – Michael Brodzinski (6) (Marshall, Rau)
	0–3	19:43 – Justin Kloos (13) (Skjei, Cammarata)
	0–4	28:12 – GW – Kyle Rau (13) (Holl, Warning)
Cody Wydo (31) (Lynch, Jacklin) – 33:48	1–4
Zac Lynch (19) (Wydo, Jacklin) – 39:16	2–4
	2–5	54:22 – PP – Hudson Fasching (13) (Cammarata, M. Reilly)
David Friedmann (11) (South) – 54:47	3–5
	3–6	58:12 – SH EN – Nate Condon (9) (Ambroz, Skjei)
	3–7	58:53 – Mike Reilly (9) (Boyd)

8 min
Penalties
6 min
25
Shots
50

March 29, 2014; 9:00 pm ESPNU	(3) St. Cloud State	4 – 3 (OT) (2–1, 1–1, 0–1, 1–0)	(2) Notre Dame	Xcel Energy Center, Saint Paul; Attendance: 9,232

Game reference

Ryan Faragher
Goalies
Steven Summerhays
Referees:
Bob St. Lawrence
Chip McDonald
Linesmen:
Dave Brown
Jim Briggs

Ryan Papa (6) (Kossila, Brodzinski) – 6:54	1–0
	1–1	10:30 – Bryan Rust (17) (Ryan, Tynan)
Brooks Bertsch (3) (Thorson, Benik) – 19:25	2–1
	2–2	28:18 – Kevin Lind (3) (Lucia, Schneider)
Jonny Brodzinski (21) (Kossila, Prow) – PP – 39:35	3–2
	3–3	49:35 – Thomas Di Pauli (3) (Rust, Johnson)
Nic Dowd (22) (Morley) – GW – 77:21	4–3

2 min
Penalties
10 min
28
Shots
42

==== Regional Final ====
March 30, 2014; 7:30 pm ESPNU	(3) St. Cloud State	0 – 4 (0–1, 0–2, 0–1)	(1) Minnesota	Xcel Energy Center, Saint Paul; Attendance: 8,893

Game reference

Ryan Faragher
Charlie Lindgren
Goalies
Adam Wilcox
Referees:
Bob St. Lawrence
Chip McDonald
Linesmen:
Dave Brown
Jim Briggs

0–1	11:09 – GW – Justin Kloos (14) (Condon, Holl)
0–2	23:48 – Seth Ambroz (14) (Parenteau, Boyd)
0–3	29:53 – Justin Kloos (15) (Cammarata, Condon)
0–4	48:16 – PP – Kyle Rau (14) (M. Reilly, Boyd)

8 min
Penalties
2 min
24
Shots
35

=== Northeast Region – Worcester, Massachusetts ===
==== Regional semifinal ====
March 29, 2014; 4:00 pm ESPNU	(4) Denver	2 – 6 (0–3, 1–3, 1–0)	(1) Boston College	DCU Center, Worcester; Attendance: 6,522

Game reference

Sam Brittain
Evan Cowley
Goalies
Thatcher Demko
Referees:
Scott Whittemore
Peter Feola
Linesmen:
Glen Cooke
Mike Emanation

	0–1	00:25 – Johnny Gaudreau (33) (Hayes, Savage)
	0–2	5:30 – Kevin Hayes (25) (Arnold, J. Gaudreau)
	0–3	9:34 – GW – Johnny Gaudreau (34) (Matheson)
	0–4	25:29 – Kevin Hayes (26) (Arnold, J. Gaudreau)
	0–5	28:13 – Johnny Gaudreau (36) (Matheson, Demko)
	0–6	35:35 – Bill Arnold (13) (Hayes, J. Gaudreau)
Trevor Moore (14) (Loney, LaLeggia) – 39:08	1–6
Evan Janssen (2) (Romig, LaLeggia) – 59:47	2–6

8 min
Penalties
14 min
20
Shots
33

March 29, 2014; 7:30 pm ESPN3	(3) Minnesota State	1 – 2 (0–1, 0–0, 1–1)	(2) Massachusetts–Lowell	DCU Center, Worcester; Attendance: 6,522

Game reference

Cole Huggins
Goalies
Connor Hellebuyck
Referees:
CJ Beaureline
Brian Aaron
Linesmen:
Joe Hutek
Tony Czech

	0–1	12:54 – SH – Joseph Pendenza (14) (unassisted)
	0–2	59:19 – GW EN – Zack Kamrass (4) (unassisted)
Zach Stepan (9) (McInnis, Leitner) – PP EA – 59:49	1–2

8 min
Penalties
8 min
36
Shots
35

==== Regional Final ====
March 30, 2014; 5:00 pm ESPNU	(2) Massachusetts–Lowell	3 – 4 (1–1, 1–1, 1–2)	(1) Boston College	DCU Center, Worcester; Attendance: 5,474

Game reference

Connor Hellebuyck
Goalies
Thatcher Demko
Referees:
Scott Whittemore
Peter Feola
Linesmen:
Glen Cooke
Mike Emanation

	0–1	12:57 – Kevin Hayes (27) (J. Gaudreau, Matheson)
Michael Kapla (3) (Arnold, McGrath) – PP – 18:08	1–1
	1–2	7:34 – Bill Arnold (14) (J. Gaudreau, Hayes)
Josh Holmstrom (7) (Wilson, Folin) – 38:44	2–2
Evan Campbell (9) (unassisted) – 40:43	3–2
	3–3	41:04 – Ryan Fitzgerald (12) (Brown, Cangelosi)
	3–4	51:16 – GW – Ian McCoshen (5) (Doherty, Hayes)

2 min
Penalties
8 min
32
Shots
29

=== East Region – Bridgeport, Connecticut ===
==== Regional semifinal ====
March 28, 2014; 2:00 pm ESPNU	(4) Vermont	2 – 5 (1–2, 0–1, 1–2)	(1) Union	Webster Bank Arena, Bridgeport; Attendance: 6,529

Game reference

Brody Hoffman
Goalies
Colin Stevens
Referees:
Todd Anderson
Joe Sullivan
Linesmen:
Andy Dokken
Justin Hills

	0–1	4:15 – SH – Matt Hatch (11) (unassisted)
Chris McCarthy (17) (Puskarich, Bradley) – 13:18	1–1
	1–2	14:27 – Max Novak (12) (Sullivan, Carr) (PP)
	1–3	34:22 – GW – Max Novak (13) (Carr, Bodie) (PP)
	1–4	51:25 – Mat Bodie (5) (Sullivan)
Chris McCarthy (18) (Bradley) – 53:19	2–4
	2–5	57:17 – EN – Matt Hatch (12) (Sullivan)

16 min
Penalties
10 min
25
Shots
39

March 28, 2014; 5:30 pm ESPNU	(3) Providence	4 – 0 (1–0, 3–0, 0–0)	(2) Quinnipiac	Webster Bank Arena, Bridgeport; Attendance: 6,529

Game reference

Jon Gillies
Goalies
Michael Garteig
Referees:
Marco Hunt
Steve Mcinchak
Linesmen:
Nick Bradshaw
Sam Shikowsky

Mark Jankowski (13) (MacPhee, Mingoia) – GW – 3:37	1–0
Anthony Florentino (5) (Tanev) – 25:10	2–0
Shane Luke (10) (Hart, Mauermann) – 28:06	3–0
Trevor Mingoia (5) (Saracino, Parisi) – PP – 34:19	4–0

6 min
Penalties
33 min
26
Shots
37

==== Regional Final ====
March 29, 2014; 3:00 pm ESPN2	(3) Providence	1 – 3 (0–1, 0–1, 1–1)	(1) Union	Webster Bank Arena, Bridgeport; Attendance: 6,655

Game reference

Jon Gillies
Goalies
Colin Stevens
Referees:
Todd Anderson
Joe Sullivan
Linesmen:
Andy Dokken
Justin Hills

	0–1	2:42 – Mat Bodie (6) (Carr, Ciampini)
	0–2	20:58 – GW – Max Novak (14) (Sullivan)
Nick Saracino (10) (Mauermann) – 54:55	1–2
	1–3	56:13 – Matt Hatch (13) (Novak, Sullivan)

2 min
Penalties
2 min
26
Shots
31

=== Midwest Region – Cincinnati ===
==== Regional semifinal ====
March 28, 2014; 4:30 pm ESPN3	(3) Colgate	0 – 1 (0–1, 0–0, 0–0)	(2) Ferris State	U.S. Bank Arena, Cincinnati; Attendance: 5,390

Game reference
Charlie Finn	Goalies	C. J. Motte	Referees: Ryan Sweeney; James Troup; Linesmen: William McGoldrick; Brendan Blanchard
0–1 / 10:01 – GW PP – Gerald Mayhew (8) (Huff, Kane)			Referees: Ryan Sweeney; James Troup; Linesmen: William McGoldrick; Brendan Blanchard
20 min	Penalties	20 min	Referees: Ryan Sweeney; James Troup; Linesmen: William McGoldrick; Brendan Blanchard
35	Shots	27	Referees: Ryan Sweeney; James Troup; Linesmen: William McGoldrick; Brendan Blanchard

March 28, 2014; 8:00 pm ESPNU	(4) North Dakota	5 – 2 (1–1, 1–0, 3–1)	(1) Wisconsin	U.S. Bank Arena, Cincinnati; Attendance: 5,390

Game reference

Zane McIntyre
Goalies
Joel Rumpel
Referees:
Geoff Miller
Ryan Hersey
Linesmen:
Bob Bernard
Tom George

Michael Parks (12) (Caggiula, MacMillan) – 05:06	1–0
	1–1	11:41 – PP – Jedd Soleway (1) (LaBate, Schulze)
Rocco Grimaldi (15) (unassisted) – 26:45	2–1
	2–2	49:32 – Tyler Barnes (14) (Kerdiles, Zengerle)
Mark MacMillan (10) (O'Donnell, Parks) – GW – 58:16	3–2
Rocco Grimaldi (16) (LaDue, MacMillan) – EN – 59:02	4–2
Rocco Grimaldi (17) (unassisted) – EN – 59:32	5–2

10 min
Penalties
14 min
35
Shots
24

==== Regional Final ====
March 29, 2014; 6:30 pm ESPNU	(4) North Dakota	2 – 1 (2OT) (0–0, 1–1, 0–0, 0–0, 1–0)	(2) Ferris State	U.S. Bank Arena, Cincinnati; Attendance: 5,721

Game reference

Zane McIntyre
Goalies
C. J. Motte
Referees:
Geoff Miller
Ryan Hersey
Linesmen:
Bob Bernard
Tom George

	0–1	27:31 – PP – Cory Kane (14) (Huff, Motte)
Stephane Pattyn (7) (LaDue, Mattson) – PP – 30:40	1–1
Connor Gaarder (8) (LaDue, Mattson) – GW – 82:28	2–1

12 min
Penalties
12 min
26
Shots
45

=== Frozen Four – Philadelphia ===
==== Semifinal ====
April 10, 2014; 8:30 pm ESPN2	(4) North Dakota	1 – 2 (0–0, 0–0, 1–2)	(1) Minnesota	Wells Fargo Center, Philadelphia; Attendance: 17,311

Game reference

Zane McIntyre
Goalies
Adam Wilcox
Referees:
Geoff Miller
Ryan Hersey
Linesmen:
Bob Bernard
Tom George

	0–1	50:51 – Sam Warning (13) (Rau)
Connor Gaarder (9) (Simpson, Schmaltz) – 51:23	1–1
	1–2	59:59 – GW SH – Justin Holl (1) (Rau, Skjei)

2 min
Penalties
4 min
37
Shots
28

April 10, 2014; 5:00 pm ESPN2	(1) Union	5 – 4 (0–1, 2–1, 3–2)	(1) Boston College	Wells Fargo Center, Philadelphia; Attendance: 17,311

Game reference

Colin Stevens
Goalies
Thatcher Demko
Referees:
Marco Hunt
Steve McInchak
Linesmen:
Nick Bradshaw
Sam Shikowsky

	0–1	02:08 – Johnny Gaudreau (36) (Hayes, Arnold)
Mat Bodie (7) (Gingras) – 22:39	1–1
Daniel Ciampini (20) (Gostisbehere, Carr) – 30:45	2–1
	2–2	35:53 – Steve Santini (1) (Calnan, Gilmour)
Daniel Ciampini (21) (Gostisbehere, Vecchione) – 46:31	3–2
Mike Vecchione (13) (Sullivan) – 51:53	4–2
	4–3	58:15 – EA – Ryan Fitzgerald (13) (Matheson, Gaudreau)
Daniel Ciampini (22) (Bodie) – GW EN – 58:51	5–3
	5–4	59:55 – EA – Patrick Brown (15) (Gaudreau, Hayes)

19 min
Penalties
6 min
41
Shots
38

=== National Championship – Philadelphia ===
April 12, 2014; 7:30 pm ESPN	(1) Union	7 – 4 (4–2, 0–1, 3–1)	(1) Minnesota	Wells Fargo Center, Philadelphia; Attendance: 18,742

Game reference
Referees: Geoff Miller; Ryan Hersey; Linesmen: Bob Bernard; Tom George

Scoring summary
Period	Team	Goal	Assist(s)	Time	Score
1st	MIN	Justin Kloos (16)	Condon and Cammarata	02:37	1–0 MIN
1st	UNI	Shayne Gostisbehere (9)	Taylor and Lichtenwald	09:26	1–1
1st	MIN	Sam Warning (14)	Rau and Parenteau	10:03	2–1 MIN
1st	UNI	Mike Vecchione (14)	Carr and Ciampini	15:09	2–2
1st	UNI	Eli Lichtenwald (9)	Gostisbehere	16:06	3–2 UNI
1st	UNI	Daniel Ciampini (23)	Novak and Hatch	17:03	4–2 UNI
2nd	MIN	Taylor Cammarata (10)	Kloos and Parenteau	21:13	4–3 UNI
3rd	UNI	Max Novak (15) – GW	Sullivan and Gingras	45:31	5–3 UNI
3rd	MIN	Hudson Fasching (14) – PP	Boyd and M. Reilly	56:20	5–4 UNI
3rd	UNI	Kevin Sullivan (9)	Bodie and Gostisbehere	58:38	6–4 UNI
3rd	UNI	Mat Bodie (8) – EN	unassisted	59:15	7–4 UNI
Penalty summary
Period	Team	Player	Penalty	Time	PIM
1st	MIN	Brady Skjei	Roughing	00:19	2:00
1st	MIN	Sam Warning	Hooking	03:11	2:00
1st	UNI	Shayne Gostisbehere	Holding	06:42	2:00
1st	UNI	Kevin Sullivan	Roughing	18:44	2:00
1st	MIN	Tom Serratore	Roughing	18:44	2:00
2nd	UNI	Daniel Ciampini	Tripping	22:25	2:00
2nd	MIN	Brady Skjei	Roughing	29:33	2:00
2nd	MIN	Jake Parenteau	Slashing	35:39	2:00
2nd	UNI	Sam Coatta	Holding the Stick	38:06	2:00
3rd	MIN	Nate Condon	Tripping	41:36	2:00
3rd	MIN	Tom Serratore	Holding	49:00	2:00
3rd	MIN	Bench (Served by Justin Kloos)	Too many men on ice	51:57	2:00
3rd	UNI	Charlie Vasaturo	Roughing	55:25	2:00

Shots by period
Team	1	2	3	T
Union	20	14	15	49
Minnesota	15	18	7	40

Goaltenders
Team	Name	Saves	Goals against	Time on ice
UNI	Colin Stevens	36	4	59:57
MIN	Adam Wilcox	41	6	58:54
MIN	Michael Shibrowski	1	0	00:45

== Record by conference ==
Conference	# of Bids	Record	Win %	Regional Finals	Frozen Four	Championship Game	Champions
Hockey East	5	4–5	.444	3	1	-	-
ECAC Hockey	3	4–2	.667	1	1	1	1
NCHC	3	3–3	.500	2	1	-	-
Big Ten	2	3–2	.600	1	1	1	-
WCHA	2	1–2	.333	1	-	-	-
Atlantic Hockey	1	0–1	.000	-	-	-	-

== Media ==
=== Television ===
ESPN had US television rights to all games during the tournament. For the tenth consecutive year ESPN aired every game, beginning with the regionals, on ESPN, ESPN2, and ESPNU, and ESPN3. They also streamed them online via WatchESPN.

==== Broadcast Assignments ====
Regionals

- East Regional: John Buccigross, Barry Melrose & Quint Kessenich – Bridgeport, Connecticut
- Midwest Regional: Joe Beninati & Darren Eliot – Cincinnati, Ohio
- Northeast Regional: Joe Davis & Billy Jaffe – Worcester, Massachusetts
- West Regional: Clay Matvick & Sean Ritchlin – St. Paul, Minnesota

Frozen Four & Championship

- John Buccigross, Barry Melrose, & Quint Kessenich – Philadelphia, Pennsylvania

=== Radio ===
Westwood One used exclusive radio rights to air both of the semifinal games and the national championship game, all together referred to as the "Frozen Four."

- Sean Grande, Cap Raeder, & Adam Wodon

== All-Tournament team ==
=== Frozen Four ===
- G: Colin Stevens (Union)
- D: Mat Bodie (Union)
- D: Shayne Gostisbehere* (Union)
- F: Daniel Ciampini (Union)
- F: Kyle Rau (Minnesota)
- F: Sam Warning (Minnesota)

* Most Outstanding Player(s)
