= Daniel Ciampini =

Canadian professional ice hockey winger

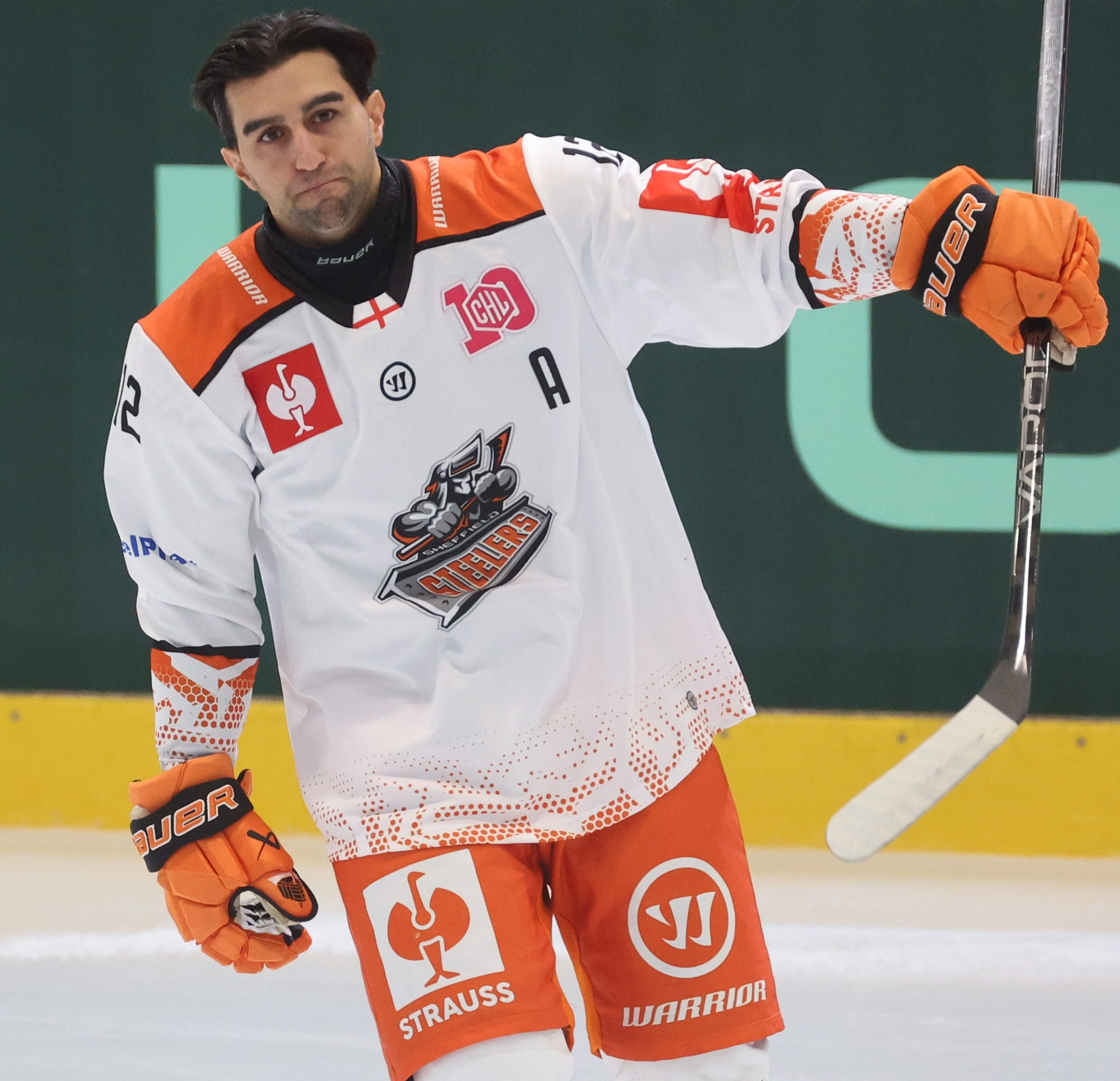
- Ciampini with the Sheffield Steelers in 2024
- Born: November 25, 1990 (age 35) Concord, Ontario, Canada
- Height: 5 ft 11 in (180 cm)
- Weight: 185 lb (84 kg; 13 st 3 lb)
- Position: Left wing
- Shot: Left
- EIHL team Former teams: Sheffield Steelers; Worcester Sharks; Rockford IceHogs; Ontario Reign; Belleville Senators; Stjernen Hockey; HC TWK Innsbruck; Rytíři Kladno; HC Bozen-Bolzano
- NHL draft: Undrafted
- Playing career: 2015–2025

Daniel Ciampini (born November 25, 1990) is a Canadian professional ice hockey winger currently playing with the Sheffield Steelers of the UK's Elite Ice Hockey League (EIHL).

== Playing career ==
Ciampini played college hockey at Union from 2011–15; he was part of the 2013–14 national championship team and was named to the 2014 NCAA All-Tournament Team. In 2014–15, Ciampini was a finalist for the Hobey Baker Award, marking him as one of the ten best players in men's college hockey; he was also named All-ECAC First Team. On March 18, 2015, Ciampini signed an amateur try-out agreement with the Worcester Sharks of the AHL. On March 23, 2015, Ciampini signed an AHL contract with Worcester.

On July 8, 2015, Ciampini secured an AHL contract as a free agent, agreeing to a one-year deal with the Rockford IceHogs. In the 2015–16 season, contributed with 1 goal in 10 games with the IceHogs. He was reassigned for the majority of the campaign with ECHL affiliate, Indy Fuel, in producing 38 points in 48 games.

As a free agent in the off-season, Ciampini secured another AHL deal, signing a one-year contract with the Ontario Reign on August 4, 2016. In the 2016–17 season, Ciampini split the year between the Reign and ECHL affiliate, the Manchester Monarchs.

On September 15, 2017, having left the Reign as a free agent, Ciampini agreed to a one-year deal with inaugural AHL club, the Belleville Senators.

After two seasons within the Belleville Senators organization, Ciampini decided to pursue a European career, agreeing to a one-year contract with Norwegian club, Stjernen Hockey of the GET-ligaen on June 14, 2019.

Following a season stint in Austria with HC TWK Innsbruck of the ICE Hockey League, Ciampini continued his European career by agreeing to a one-year contract with Czech club, Rytíři Kladno of the ELH, on July 14, 2021.

After a spell in Italy with HC Bozen-Bolzano, Ciampini signed terms ahead of the 2022–23 season with UK EIHL side Sheffield Steelers.

In his second year with the Steelers, Ciampini would win the Grand Slam.

== Career statistics ==
			Regular season					Playoffs
Season	Team	League	GP	G	A	Pts	PIM	GP	G	A	Pts	PIM
2006–07	Stouffville Spirit	OPJHL	2	1	1	2	0	—	—	—	—	—
2007–08	St. Michael's Buzzers	OPJHL	15	3	5	8	10	—	—	—	—	—
2008–09	St. Michael's Buzzers	OJHL	40	14	16	30	43	—	—	—	—	—
2009–10	St. Michael's Buzzers	CCHL	49	42	46	88	64	—	—	—	—	—
2010–11	St. Michael's Buzzers	OJHL	50	33	49	82	64	3	1	3	4	4
2011–12	Union Dutchmen	ECAC	15	3	3	6	2	—	—	—	—	—
2012–13	Union Dutchmen	ECAC	36	11	10	21	28	—	—	—	—	—
2013–14	Union Dutchmen	ECAC	41	23	18	41	26	—	—	—	—	—
2014–15	Union Dutchmen	ECAC	39	26	24	50	30	—	—	—	—	—
2014–15	Worcester Sharks	AHL	15	3	3	6	2	—	—	—	—	—
2015–16	Indy Fuel	ECHL	48	14	24	38	14	—	—	—	—	—
2015–16	Rockford IceHogs	AHL	10	1	0	1	2	—	—	—	—	—
2016–17	Manchester Monarchs	ECHL	28	12	16	28	8	18	4	10	14	4
2016–17	Ontario Reign	AHL	23	1	4	5	12	—	—	—	—	—
2017–18	Belleville Senators	AHL	49	7	9	16	14	—	—	—	—	—
2017–18	Brampton Beast	ECHL	15	4	12	16	4	—	—	—	—	—
2018–19	Brampton Beast	ECHL	51	16	35	51	26	6	4	3	7	8
2018–19	Belleville Senators	AHL	19	1	2	3	2	—	—	—	—	—
2019–20	Stjernen Hockey	GET	43	23	29	52	70	—	—	—	—	—
2020–21	HC TWK Innsbruck	ICEHL	48	28	31	59	28	—	—	—	—	—
2021–22	Rytíři Kladno	ELH	8	1	0	1	4	—	—	—	—	—
2021–22	HC Bozen-Bolzano	ICEHL	22	3	4	7	12	2	0	0	0	0
2022–23	Sheffield Steelers	EIHL	51	17	31	48	26	4	0	4	4	2
2023–24	Sheffield Steelers "A"	EIHL	54	18	34	52	20	4	2	2	4	4
2024–25	Sheffield Steelers "A"	EIHL	52	5	21	26	39	4	1	1	2	0
AHL totals			116	13	18	31	32	—	—	—	—	—

== Awards and honors ==
Award	Year
College
ECAC All-Academic Team	2012–13, 2013–14
NCAA Division I Champion	2014
NCAA All-Tournament Team	2014
Hobey Baker Award top ten finalist	2014–15
All-ECAC First Team	2014–15
Division I AHCA All-American East First Team	2014–15
ICEHL
ICEHL All-Star Team	2020–21
EIHL
EIHL Champion	2023–24
EIHL Playoff Champion	2023–24
EIHL Challenge Cup Champion	2023–24
