= Union Garnet Chargers men's ice hockey =

Men's college ice hockey program

- Current season
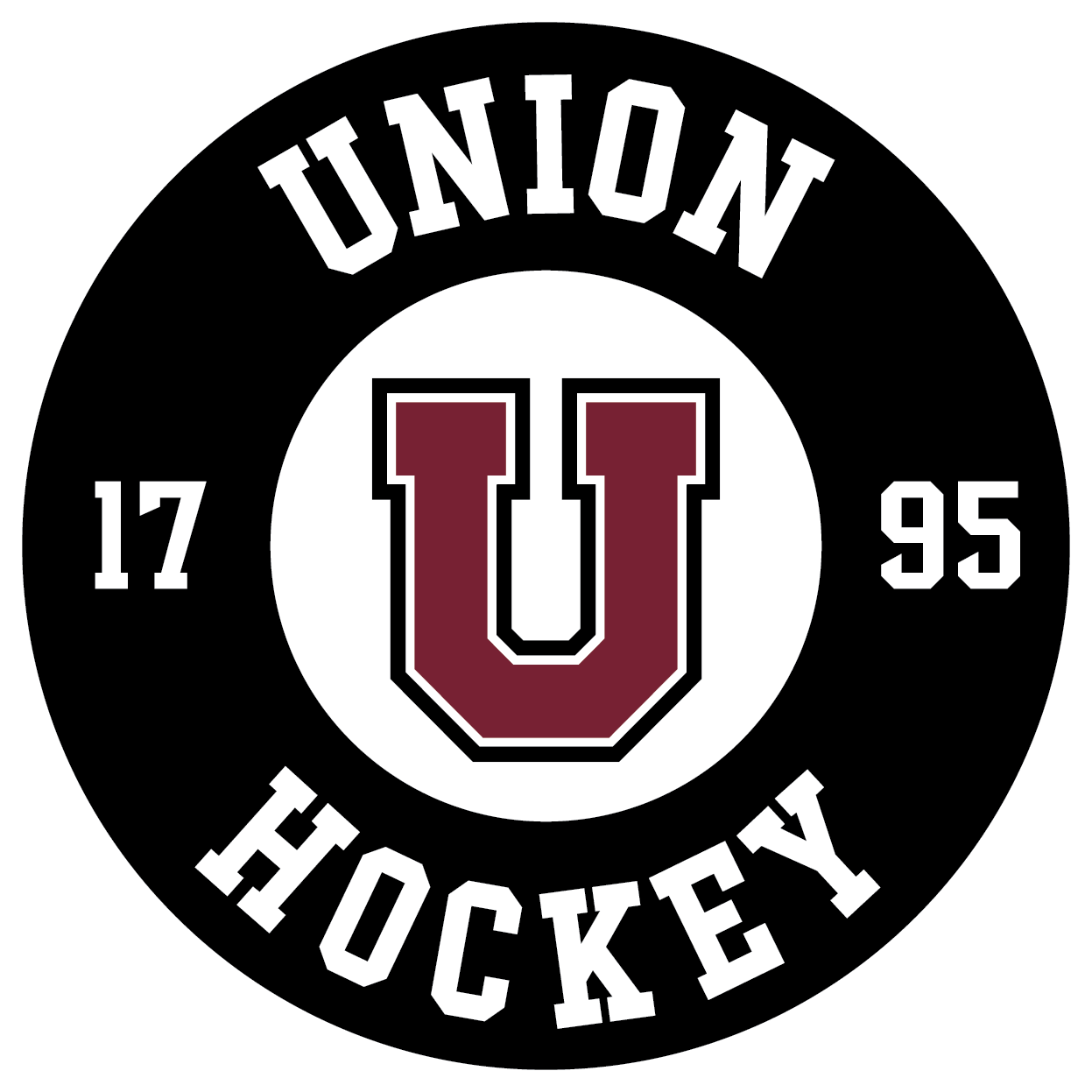
- University: Union College
- Conference: ECAC Hockey
- Governing Body: NCAA Division I
- First season: 1903–04
- Athletic director: Jim McLaughlin
- Head coach: Josh Hauge; 4th season, 49–51–8 (.491)
- Assistant coaches: John Ronan; Mike Zannella; Bryan McDonald
- Arena: M&T Bank Center; Schenectady, New York
- Student section: The U Crew
- Colors: Union garnet and white

NCAA tournament champions
- DI: 2014

NCAA tournament Frozen Four
- DI: 2012, 2014; DIII: 1984, 1985

NCAA tournament appearances
- DI: 2011, 2012, 2013, 2014, 2017; DIII: 1984, 1985, 1986, 1989

Conference tournament champions
- ECAC West: 1985; ECAC: 2012, 2013, 2014

Conference regular season champions
- ECAC 2: 1977; ECAC: 2011, 2012, 2014, 2017

Current uniform

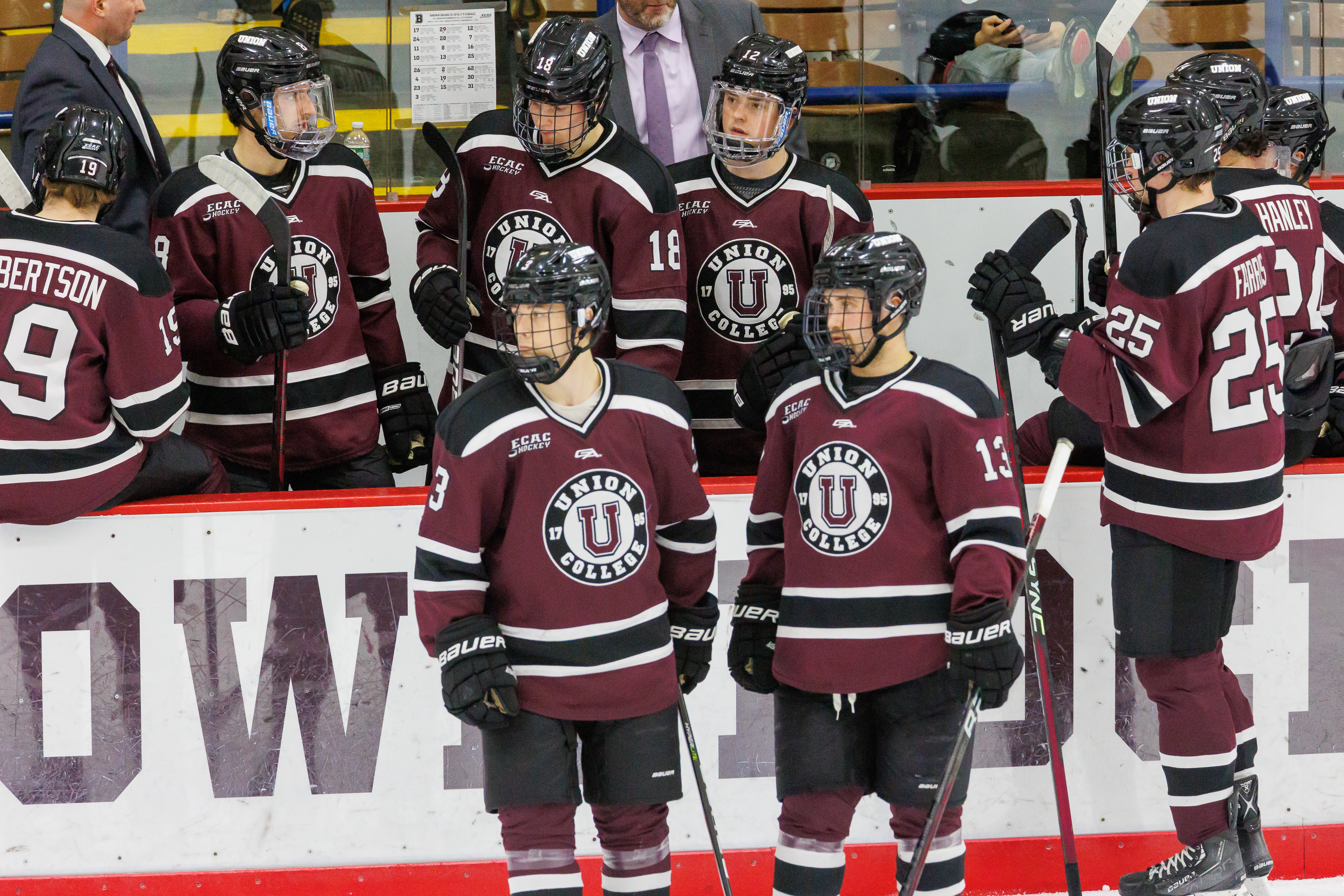
Dutchmen in 2023

The Union Garnet Chargers ice hockey team is a National Collegiate Athletic Association (NCAA) Division I men's college ice hockey program that represents Union College. The Garnet Chargers are a member of ECAC Hockey. They play at the new M&T Bank Center on the Mohawk River in Schenectady, New York. The Garnet Chargers (known as the Dutchmen at the time) won the 2014 NCAA Division I men's ice hockey tournament by defeating the Minnesota Golden Gophers 7–4.

== Program history ==
The hockey team was founded in 1904 making it the 7th oldest college program playing in NCAA Division I and provides the school with a long and colorful history in the sport. Men at Union have played hockey in four distinct periods: club hockey from 1904 to 1911, varsity hockey from 1919 to 1949 (from 1943 to 1948 there was a hiatus from play due to WW II), NCAA Division III hockey from 1975 to 1990 and NCAA Division I hockey from 1991–present.

=== Early history 1904–1911 ===
Union's first game, played on February 3, 1904, was a victory over the Union Classical Institute. Three other games were played that inaugural season including a 1–4 loss to rival Rensselaer. Lacking a rink of its own during that inaugural season, all games were played on the opponent's home ice. The first attempt at creating an on-campus outdoor rink was made by students in 1905 when a plow and scaper was hired to form a level area with earthen banks near what is now Memorial Chapel. The club team's record in known games during those early years was 6–7–1. No collegiate games were played in the 1910 or 1911 seasons because Union's players couldn't afford the costs of travel and opponent game guarantee fees. The club team subsequently disbanded bringing a close to the earliest era of hockey at Union.

=== Division I era 1991–present ===
In 2012, the team made the school's first NCAA men's ice hockey championship Frozen Four appearance, losing to Ferris State University.

In the 2013–2014 season, the team won the 2014 NCAA Division I men's ice hockey tournament, the first in school history. The team had an overall 32-6-4 record with 12 consecutive wins leading up to the national title win. Junior Shayne Gostisbehere won the Most Outstanding Player of the 2014 Frozen Four, and signed his NHL entry level contract with the Philadelphia Flyers 3 days after the championship.

In 2017, senior Mike Vecchione was named as a finalist for the Hobey Baker Award. Vecchione finished his collegiate career with a school record of 175 points, along with the leading number of all-time assists at 104. He led the D1 league with 21 multiple point games, 17 goals, 4 short handed goals, 4 game winning goals, and a 60.4% faceoff win percentage.

In 2023, the college changed the school's athletic nickname from "Dutchmen" and "Dutchwomen" to "Garnet Chargers" as part of a branding update. Garnet has been the school's official color for 150 years, and the name "chargers" is a reference to "Schenectady's legacy as a leader in electrical technologies."

In the 2023-24 season, the team had the second-best penalty kill in college hockey, at 87.9%.

== Championships ==
=== NCAA National Championships ===
Year	Champion	Score	Runner-up	City	Arena	Coach	MOP
2014	Union	7–4	Minnesota	Philadelphia, PA	Wells Fargo Center	Rick Bennett	Shayne Gostisbehere

=== ECAC Hockey Tournament championships (Whitelaw Cup) ===
Year	Champion	Score	Runner-up	City	Arena	Coach	MOP	Notes
2012	Union	3–1	Harvard	Atlantic City, NJ	Boardwalk Hall	Rick Bennett	Jeremy Welsh	Lost to Ferris State in NCAA Semifinal
2013	Union	3–1	Brown	Atlantic City, NJ	Boardwalk Hall	Rick Bennett	Troy Grosenick	Lost to Quinnipiac in NCAA East Regional
2014	Union	4–2	Colgate	Lake Placid, NY	Herb Brooks Arena	Rick Bennett	Daniel Carr	Defeated Minnesota in NCAA Championship

Runners-up in 2010

=== ECAC Hockey Regular season Championships (Cleary Cup) ===
Year	Conference record	Overall record	Coach
2010–11	17–3–2	26–10–4	Nate Leaman
2011–12	14–4–4	26–8–7	Rick Bennett
2013–14	18–3–1	32–6–4	Rick Bennett
2016–17†	16–4–2	25–10–3	Rick Bennett

† Shared with Harvard

== Players ==
=== Current roster ===
As of August 10, 2025.

No.	Nat.	Player	Class	Pos	Height	Weight	DoB	Hometown	Previous team	NHL rights
2	(United States)	D. J. Hart	Junior	D	6' 3" (1.91 m)	210 lb (95 kg)	2002-02-23	Stamford, Connecticut	Lincoln Stars (USHL)	—
3	(United States)	Cal Mell	Senior	D	5' 11" (1.8 m)	180 lb (82 kg)	2001-01-30	Alpharetta, Georgia	Janesville Jets (NAHL)	—
4	(United States)	Will Felicio	Sophomore	D	5' 10" (1.78 m)	161 lb (73 kg)	2006-05-19	Holden, Massachusetts	Michigan (Big Ten)	—
5	(United States)	Carter Rose	Junior	D	6' 2" (1.88 m)	195 lb (88 kg)	2002-08-09	Brasher Falls, New York	Clarkson (ECAC)	—
6	(United States)	Troy Pelton	Freshman	F	6' 1" (1.85 m)	185 lb (84 kg)	2004-12-06	Clifton Park, New York	Corpus Christi IceRays (NAHL)	—
7	(United States)	Nick Young (C)	Senior	D	6' 3" (1.91 m)	215 lb (98 kg)	2001-09-12	Raleigh, North Carolina	St. Cloud Norsemen (NAHL)	—
8	(United States)	Connor Smith	Sophomore	F	5' 11" (1.8 m)	172 lb (78 kg)	2003-06-06	Hugo, Minnesota	Oklahoma Warriors (NAHL)	—
9	(United States)	Alex Laurenza	Freshman	F	5' 10" (1.78 m)	165 lb (75 kg)	2005-02-24	Woodbridge, Ontario	Austin Bruins (NAHL)	—
10	(United States)	Ethan Benz	Senior	F	6' 1" (1.85 m)	190 lb (86 kg)	2001-03-29	Shakopee, Minnesota	St. Cloud Norsemen (NAHL)	—
11	(Canada)	Colby MacArthur	Senior	F	6' 3" (1.91 m)	185 lb (84 kg)	2001-11-02	Summerside, Prince Edward Island	Summerside Western Capitals (MHL)	—
12	(United States)	Carter Korpi	Senior	F	6' 0" (1.83 m)	185 lb (84 kg)	2001-07-28	South Lyon, Michigan	Wichita Falls Warriors (NAHL)	—
14	(Canada)	Brandon Buhr	Senior	F	6' 2" (1.88 m)	200 lb (91 kg)	2002-07-07	North Vancouver, British Columbia	Alberni Valley Bulldogs (BCHL)	—
15	(Canada)	Ollie Chessler	Freshman	D	5' 11" (1.8 m)	174 lb (79 kg)	2004-07-09	Watertown, Massachusetts	Bismarck Bobcats (NAHL)	—
16	(Canada)	Lucas Buzziol	Sophomore	F	6' 1" (1.85 m)	194 lb (88 kg)	2004-04-05	Mississauga, Ontario	Alberni Valley Bulldogs (BCHL)	—
17	(United States)	Parker Lindauer	Senior	F	5' 11" (1.8 m)	172 lb (78 kg)	2001-05-17	Madison, Wisconsin	Maine (HEA)	—
18	(United States)	Ben Muthersbaugh	Sophomore	F	5' 11" (1.8 m)	187 lb (85 kg)	2004-02-15	Gilford, New Hampshire	Cedar Rapids RoughRiders (USHL)	—
19	(United States)	Drew Sutton	Sophomore	F	5' 10" (1.78 m)	170 lb (77 kg)	2003-02-10	Hortonville, Wisconsin	Oklahoma Warriors (NAHL)	—
21	(United States)	Tyler Dunbar	Junior	D	6' 1" (1.85 m)	197 lb (89 kg)	2003-12-18	Sault Ste. Marie, Michigan	Colorado College (NCHC)	—
22	(United States)	Jacob Jeannette	Junior	F	6' 1" (1.85 m)	200 lb (91 kg)	2002-12-13	Duluth, Minnesota	Tri-City Storm (USHL)	—
24	(United States)	Nate Hanley	Senior	F	5' 11" (1.8 m)	185 lb (84 kg)	2002-05-30	Rocky Point, New York	Cedar Rapids RoughRiders (USHL)	—
26	(United States)	Brendan Miles	Senior	D	6' 1" (1.85 m)	180 lb (82 kg)	2001-12-12	Farmington Hills, Michigan	Michigan (Big Ten)	—
27	(United States)	Riley Brueck	Sophomore	F	6' 2" (1.88 m)	190 lb (86 kg)	2003-05-07	Chesterfield, Missouri	Oklahoma Warriors (NAHL)	—
28	(Canada)	Étienne Lessard	Freshman	D	5' 9" (1.75 m)	168 lb (76 kg)	2004-03-22	Blainville, Quebec	Lincoln Stars (USHL)	—
29	(Canada)	Brayden Gillespie	Freshman	G	5' 11" (1.8 m)	174 lb (79 kg)	2005-07-23	Oakville, Ontario	Brampton Steelheads (OHL)	—
30	(Canada)	Brendan Holahan	Freshman	G	6' 2" (1.88 m)	181 lb (82 kg)	2004-06-15	New Canaan, Connecticut	El Paso Rhinos (NAHL)	—
31	(United States)	Cameron Korpi	Sophomore	G	6' 4" (1.93 m)	172 lb (78 kg)	2004-05-26	South Lyon, Michigan	Michigan (Big Ten)	—
33	(United States)	Luke Buss	Sophomore	F	5' 10" (1.78 m)	174 lb (79 kg)	2003-02-14	Columbus, Ohio	Wisconsin (Big Ten)	—

== Awards & honors ==
As of April 2017

Hobey Baker Memorial Award

- Mike Vecchione - Hat Trick Finalist, F: 2017
- Troy Grosenick - Top 10 Finalist, G: 2012
- Shayne Gostisbehere - Top 10 Finalist, D: 2014
- Daniel Ciampini - Top 10 Finalist, F: 2015
- Spencer Foo - Top 10 Finalist, F: 2017

Spencer Penrose Award - AHCA Coach of the Year

- Nate Leaman: 2011
- Rick Bennett: 2014

USCHO Coach of the Year

- Rick Bennett: 2014

College Hockey News Coach of the Year

- Rick Bennett: 2014

NCAA Frozen Four Most Outstanding Player

- Shayne Gostisbehere, D: 2014

NCAA Frozen Four All-Tournament Team

- Matt Bodie, D: 2014
- Daniel Ciampini, F: 2014
- Shayne Gostisbehere, D: 2014
- Colin Stevens, G: 2014

NCAA East Regional Most Outstanding Player

- Max Novak, F: 2014
- Jeremy Welsh, F: 2014

Tim Taylor Award - ECAC Hockey Coach of the Year

- Bruce Delventhal: 1994
- Stan Moore: 1997
- Nate Leaman: 2010, 2011
- Rick Bennett: 2012, 2017

ECAC Hockey Player of the Year

- Shayne Gostisbehere, D: 2013 (co-recipient)
- Mike Vecchione, F: 2017

Ken Dryden Award - ECAC Hockey Goaltender of the Year

- Trevor Koenig, G: 1997
- Keith Kinkaid, G: 2011
- Troy Grosenick, G: 2012
- Colin Stevens, G: 2014

ECAC Hockey Best Defensive Defenseman

- Andrew Will, D: 1997 (co-recipient)
- Brock Matheson, D: 2011
- Shayne Gostisbehere, D: 2014

ECAC Hockey Best Defensive Forward

- Adam Presizniuk, F: 2011
- Kelly Zajac, F: 2012

ECAC Hockey Student Athlete of the Year

- Oliver Bouchard: 2007
- Matt Cook: 2009
- Stephane Boileau: 2011
- Josh Kosack: 2022

ECAC Hockey Tournament Most Outstanding Player

- Jeremy Welsh, F: 2012
- Troy Grosenick, G: 2013
- Daniel Carr, F: 2014

ECAC Hockey All-Tournament Team

- Mike Schreiber, D: 2010
- Daniel Carr, F: 2012, 2013, 2014
- Shayne Gostisbehere, D: 2012
- Troy Grosenick, G: 2012, 2013
- Jeremy Welsh, F: 2012
- Greg Coburn, D: 2013
- Max Novak, F: 2013
- Matt Bodie, D: 2014
- Shayne Gostisbehere, D: 2014
- Colin Stevens, G: 2014
- Mike Vecchione, F: 2014

AHCA First Team All-Americans (DI) - East

- 1995-96: Trevor Koenig, G
- 2010-11: Keith Kinkaid, G
- 2011-12: Troy Grosenick, G
- 2013-14: Matt Bodie, D; Shayne Gostisbehere, D
- 2014-15: Daniel Ciampini, F
- 2016-17: Mike Vecchione, F; Spencer Foo, F

AHCA Second Team All-Americans (DI) - East

- 2011-12: Matt Bodie, D; Jeremy Welsh, F
- 2012-13: Shayne Gostisbehere, D
- 2013-14: Daniel Carr, F; Colin Stevens, G

AHCA Second Team All-Americans (DIII) - East

- 1985-86: Wayne McDougall, G
- 1999-89: Ron Kinghorn, G
- 1989-90: Terry Campbell, F

Academic All-American Second Team

- 2009-10: Stephane Boileau
- 2013-14: Cole Ikkala

Academic All-American Third Team

- 2011-12: Troy Grosenick
- 2012-13: Troy Grosenick
- 2013-14: Matt Bodie
- 2016-17: Mike Vecchione

Union College Athletics Hall of Fame

- Wayne McDougall, G: 2005
- Steve Baker, G: 2007
- Gil Egan, F: 2008
- Craig Ferrero, F: 2009
- Tod Fobare, F: 2010
- Terry Campbell, F: 2015
- Charlie Morrison, Head Coach: 2015
- 1983-84 Men's Hockey Team: 2015
- Dalton Menhall: 2017
- Jack Rankin: 2019

== Historic records ==
=== Records vs. Current ECAC Hockey Teams ===
As of the completion of the 2023–24 season

School	Team	Away Arena	Overall record	Win %	Last Result
Brown University	Bears	Meehan Auditorium	25–28–15	.478	6-0 W
Clarkson University	Golden Knights	Cheel Arena	30–40–5	.433	5-1 W
Colgate University	Raiders	Class of 1965 Arena	33–49–4	.407	3-4 L
Cornell University	Big Red	Lynah Rink	23–49–10	.341	3-2 W
Dartmouth College	Big Green	Thompson Arena	36–31–7	.534	2-4 L
Harvard University	Crimson	Bright-Landry Hockey Center	20–39–6	.354	6-2 W
Princeton University	Tigers	Hobey Baker Memorial Rink	43–27–9	.601	2-2 SOL
Quinnipiac University	Bobcats	People's United Center	17–26–5	.406	2-6 L
Rensselaer Polytechnic Institute	Engineers	Houster Field House	47–56–12	.461	5-3 W
St. Lawrence University	Saints	Appleton Arena	36–40–5	.475	2-2 SOW
Yale University	Bulldogs	Ingalls Rink	29–35–7	.451	1-3 L

=== In-season tournaments ===
As of April 2017

Event name	Host city	Season	All-Time Record
Badger Showdown	Madison, WI	2003–04	0–2
Capital District Mayor's Cup	Albany, NY	2012–13, 2013–14, 2014–15, 2015–16, 2016–17	3–2
Brice Alaska Goal Rush	Fairbanks, AK	2010–11	1–1
Catamount Cup	Burlington, VT	2012–13	1–1
Concordia Invitational	Montreal, QE	1993–94	2–0
Dodge Holiday Classic	Providence, RI	2005–06	1–1
Dunkin Donuts Coffee Pot	Providence, RI	2004–05	0–1–1
Frozen Holiday Classic	Bridgeport, CT	2014–15	1–1
Governor's Cup	Albany, NY	2008–09, 2007–08, 2006–07	1–4–1
Ice Breaker Cup	Denver, CO	1999–00	0–2
Icebreaker Invitational	Colorado Springs, CO	2005–06	1–1
J.C. Penney Classic	Orono, ME	1996–97, 1998–99	2–2
Ledyard Bank Classic	Hanover, NH	2015–16	2–0
Mariucci Classic	Minneapolis, MN	2000–01, 2005–06, 2010–11	2–3–1
Omaha Stampede	Omaha, NE	2008–09	1–1
Pete Kelly Cup	Fredericton, NB	2007–08	1–1
Rensselaer Invitational	Troy, NY	1991–92, 1998–99, 1999–00, 2009–10	2–6
Shillelagh tournament	Notre Dame, IN	2008–09, 2014–15	2–2
Sheraton/TD Banknorth Tournament	Burlington, VT	2006–07	1–1
UConn Classic	Storrs, CT	2009–10	1–1

== Program records ==
=== Individual – career ===
- Most goals in a career: Gil Egan, 83, (1981–85)
- Most points in a career: Mike Vecchione, 176, (2013–17)
- Most assists in a career: Terry Campbell, 119, (1987–91)
- Most power play goals in a career: Daniel Carr, 34, (2010–14)
- Most game winning goals in a career: Wayne Simpson, 16, (2009–13)
- Most shots in a career: Wayne Simpson, 447, (2009–13)
- Most wins in a career: Kris Mayotte, 46, (2002–06)
- Best goals-against-average in a career: Troy Grosenick, 1.89, (2010–13)
- Most saves in a career: Brandon Snee, 3,085, (1998–02)
- Best save percentage in a career: Troy Grosenick, .930, (2010–13)

=== Individual – season ===
- Most goals in a season: Mike Vecchione, 29, (2016–17)
- Most points in a season: Mike Vecchione, 63, (2016–17)
- Most assists in a season: Spencer Foo, 36, (2016–17)
- Most power play goals in a season: Daniel Carr, 12, (2010–11)
- Most game winning goals in a season: Max Novak, 8, (2013–14)
- Most shots in a season: Shayne Gostisbehere, 159, (2013–14)
- Most wins in a season: Colin Stevens, 28, (2013–14)
- Best goals-against-average in a season: Troy Grosenick, 1.65, (2011–12)
- Most saves in a career: Kris Mayotte, 987, (2005–06)
- Best save percentage in a career: Troy Grosenick, .936, (2011–12)

=== Team – game ===
- Most goals in a game: 11 vs. Clarkson (2/5/10)
- Most goals allowed in a game: 10 vs. Penn State (3/25/17)
- Most goals combined in a game: 15 vs. Clarkson (11/13/93) & Merrimack (11/1/91)
- Most shots taken in a game: 75 vs. Quinnipiac (3/12/10)
- Most shots allowed in a game: 63 vs. Bemidji State (10/26/02)
- Fewest shots taken in a game: 13 (5x) last time vs. Cornell (11/18/05)
- Fewest shots allowed in a game: 9 vs. Cornell (2/11/11)
- Most penalties in a game: 27 vs. Cornell (12/4/98)
- Most penalty minutes in a game: 116 vs. Cornell (12/4/98)
- Longest game: 150:22 in 5 OTs lasting 5 hrs., 56 minutes vs. Quinnipiac (3/12/10)

=== Team – season ===
- Most wins in a season: 32 (2013–14)
- Most conference wins in a season: 18 (2013–14) ECAC Hockey
- Most consecutive wins in a season: 12 (2013–14)
- Longest unbeaten streak in a season: 17 (2013–14)

== Head coaches ==
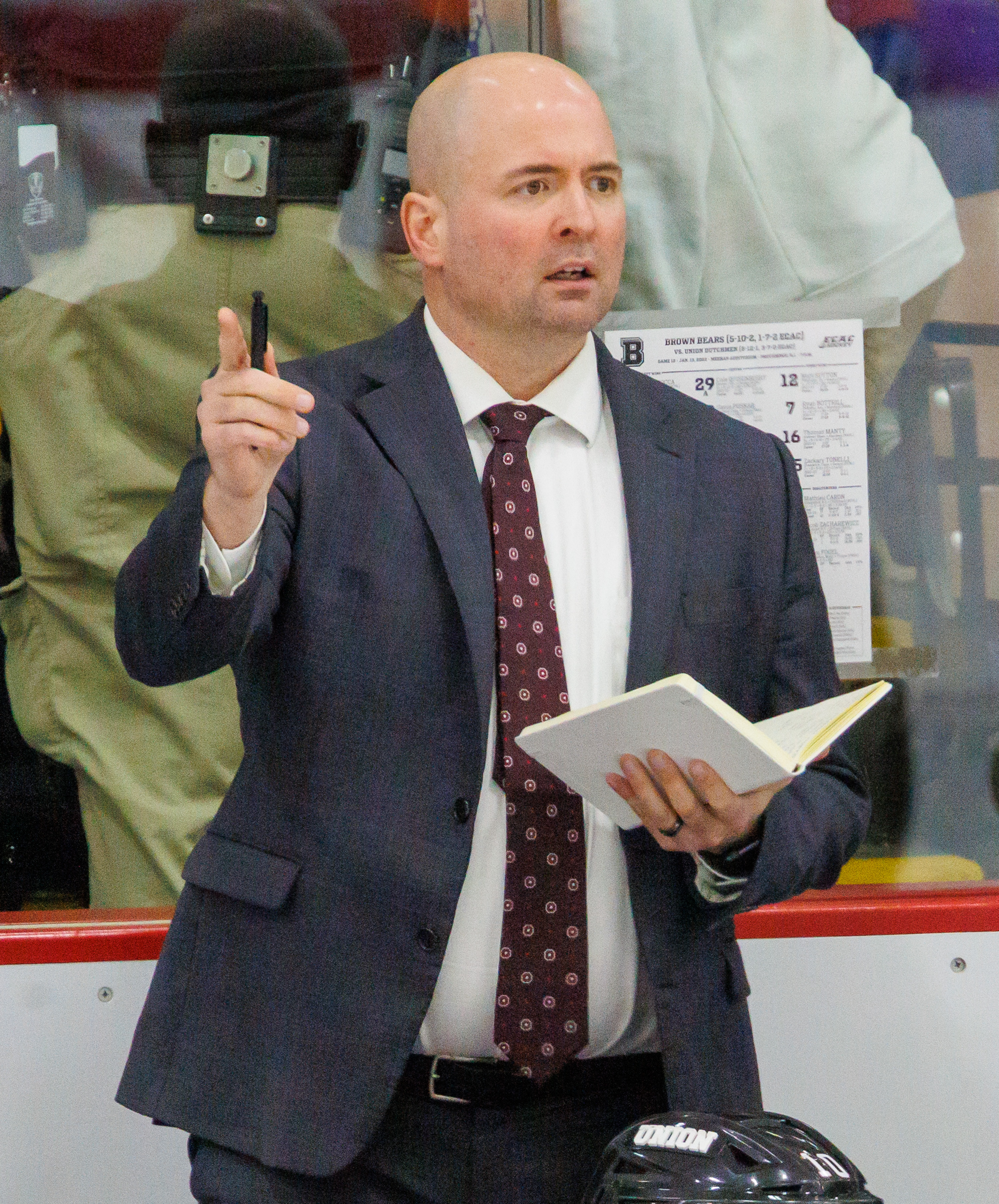
Josh Hauge

=== All-time coaching records ===
As of completion of the 2023–24 season

Tenure	Coach	Years	Record	Pct.
1903–1904, 1905–1911	No Coach	7	6–7–1	.464
1919–1924	Ambrose Clark	4	7–10–0	.412
1924–1925	Henry Gardner	1	1–3–0	.250
1925–1930	H. A. Larabee	5	9–14–3	.404
1930–1933	William Harkness	3	4–8–1	.346
1933–1935	H. L. Achilles	2	4–7–0	.364
1935–1936, 1939–1942, 1947–1949	Arthur C. Lawrence	6	10–30–2	.262
1936–1939	Duke Nelson	3	3–11–2	.250
1975–1977	Ned Harkness	3^{†}	45–8–2	.836
1978	Bob Driscoll	1^{†}	0–13–0	.000
1978–1988	Charles Morrison	10	123–147–9	.457
1988–1996	Bruce Delventhal	8	89–111–21	.450
1996–1998	Stan Moore	2	24–35–7	.417
1998–2003	Kevin Sneddon	5	50–99–18	.353
2003–2011	Nate Leaman	8	138–127–35	.518
2011–2022	Rick Bennett	10^{‡}	192–133–45	.580
2022	John Ronan	1^{‡}	8–8–1	.500
2022–Present	Josh Hauge	3	49–51–8	.491
Totals	17 coaches	83 Seasons	762–822–154	.483

† Bob Driscoll coached the final 13 games of the 1977–78 season after Ned Harkness resigned.
‡ Rick Bennett was suspended on January 19, 2022 and John Ronan coached the final 17 games of the season.

== Garnet Chargers in the NHL ==
As of July 1, 2025.

= NHL All-Star team	= NHL All-Star	= NHL All-Star and NHL All-Star team	= Hall of Famers

Player	Position	Team(s)	Years	NHL Games	Stanley Cups
Steve Baker	Goaltender	NYR	1979–1983	4	0
Daniel Carr	Left Wing	MTL, VGK, NSH, WSH	2015–2023	117	0
Nick DeSimone	Defenseman	CGY, NJD, UTA	2022–Present	58	0
Spencer Foo	Right Wing	CGY	2017–2018	4	0
Mario Giallonardo	Defenseman	COR	1979–1981	23	0
Shayne Gostisbehere	Defenseman	PHI, PHO, CAR, DET	2014–Present	689	0
Collin Graf	Right Wing	SJS	2023–Present	40	0
Troy Grosenick	Goaltender	SJS, LAK	2014–2022	4	0
Josh Jooris	Right Wing	CGY, NYR, ARI, CAR, PIT	2014–2018	213	0
Duane Joyce	Defenseman	DAL	1993–1994	3	0
Keith Kinkaid	Goaltender	NJD, MTL, NYR, BOS, COL	2012–2023	169	0
Sam Morton	Right Wing	CGY	2024–Present	1	0
Mike Vecchione	Center	PHI, WSH	2016–2022	3	0
Jeremy Welsh	Defenseman	CAR, VAN, STL	2011–2016	27	0

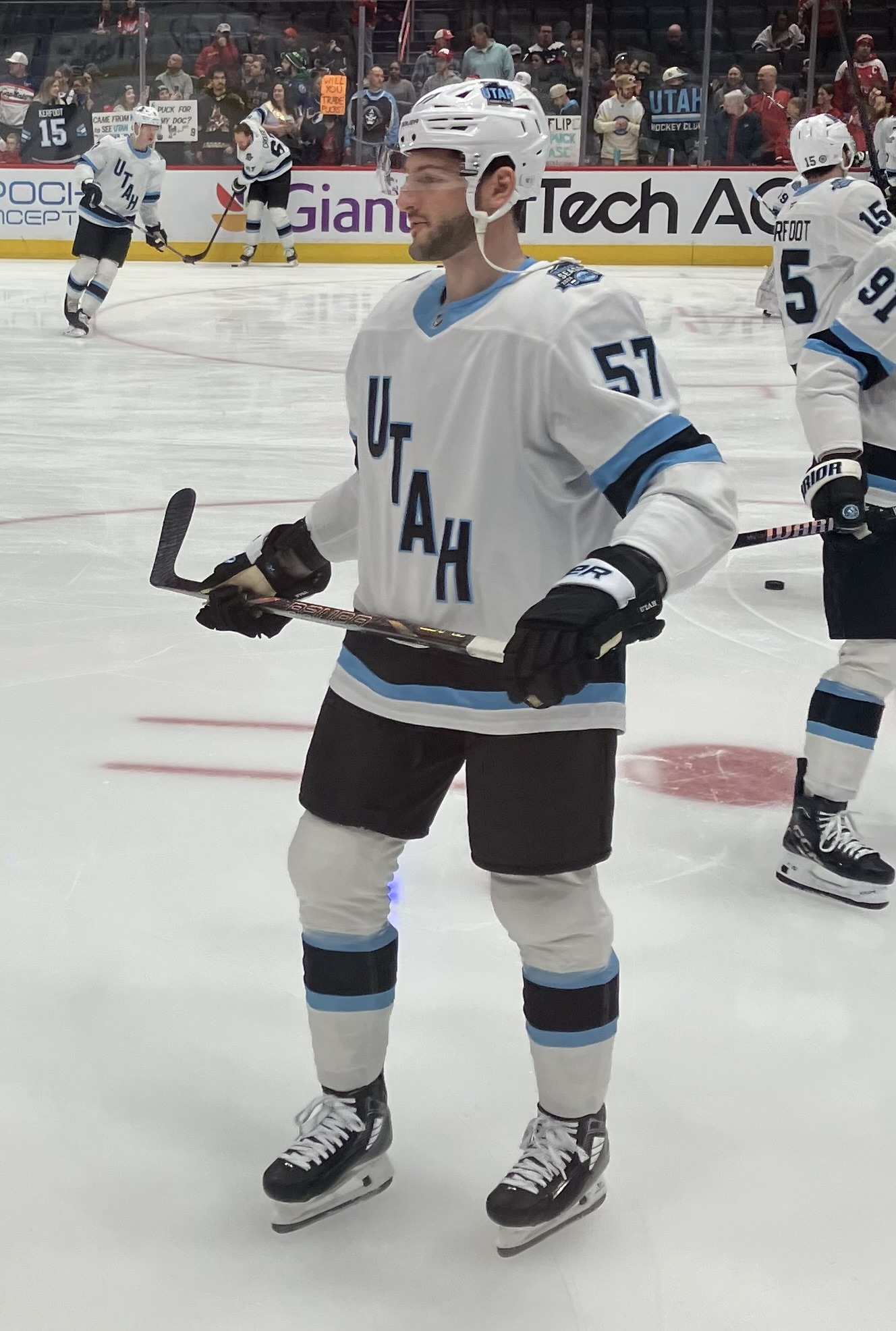
Nick DeSimone

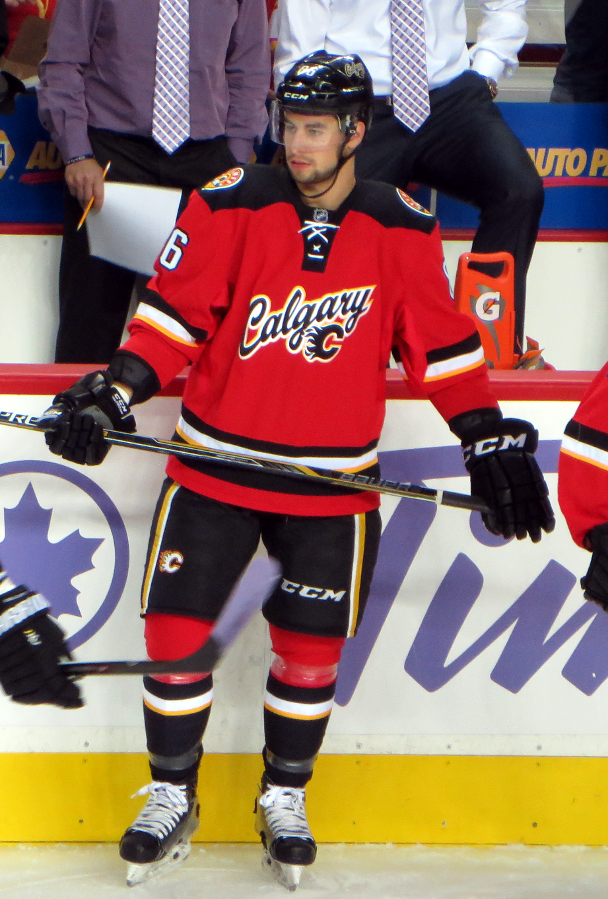
Josh Jooris

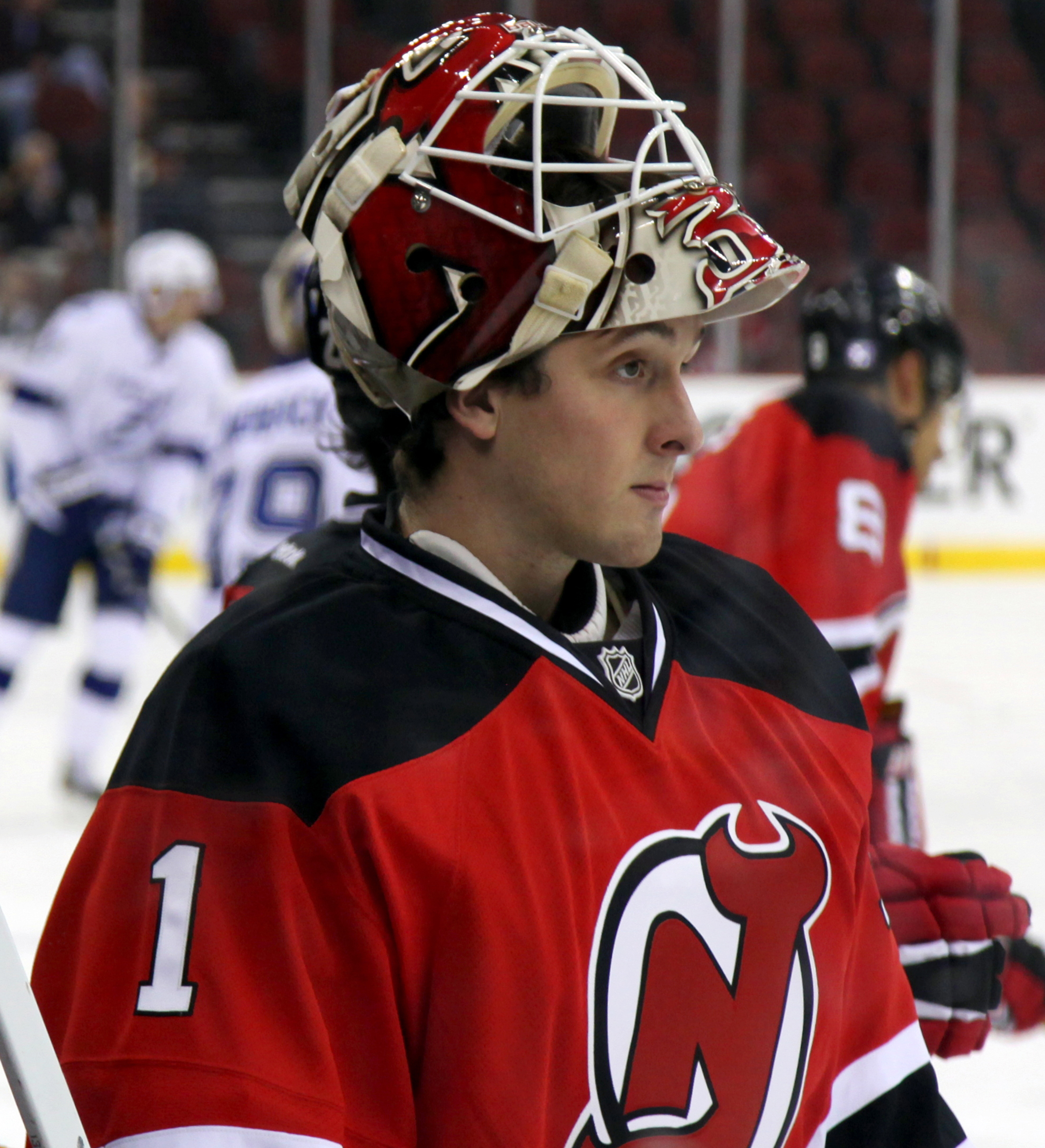
Keith Kinkaid

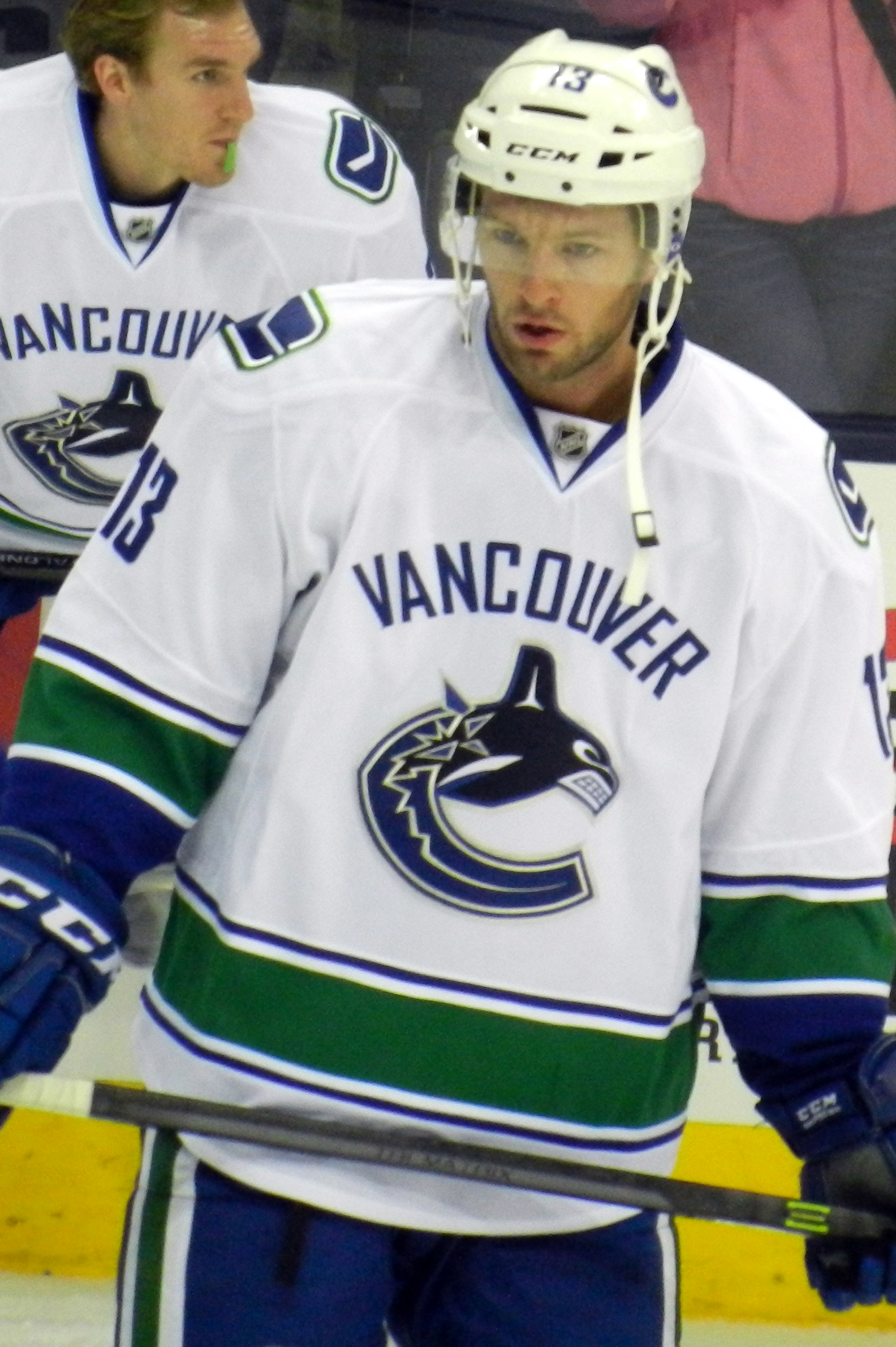
Jeremy Welsh

== See also ==
- Union Garnet Chargers women's ice hockey
- Union Garnet Chargers
