= Mike Vecchione =

American ice hockey player

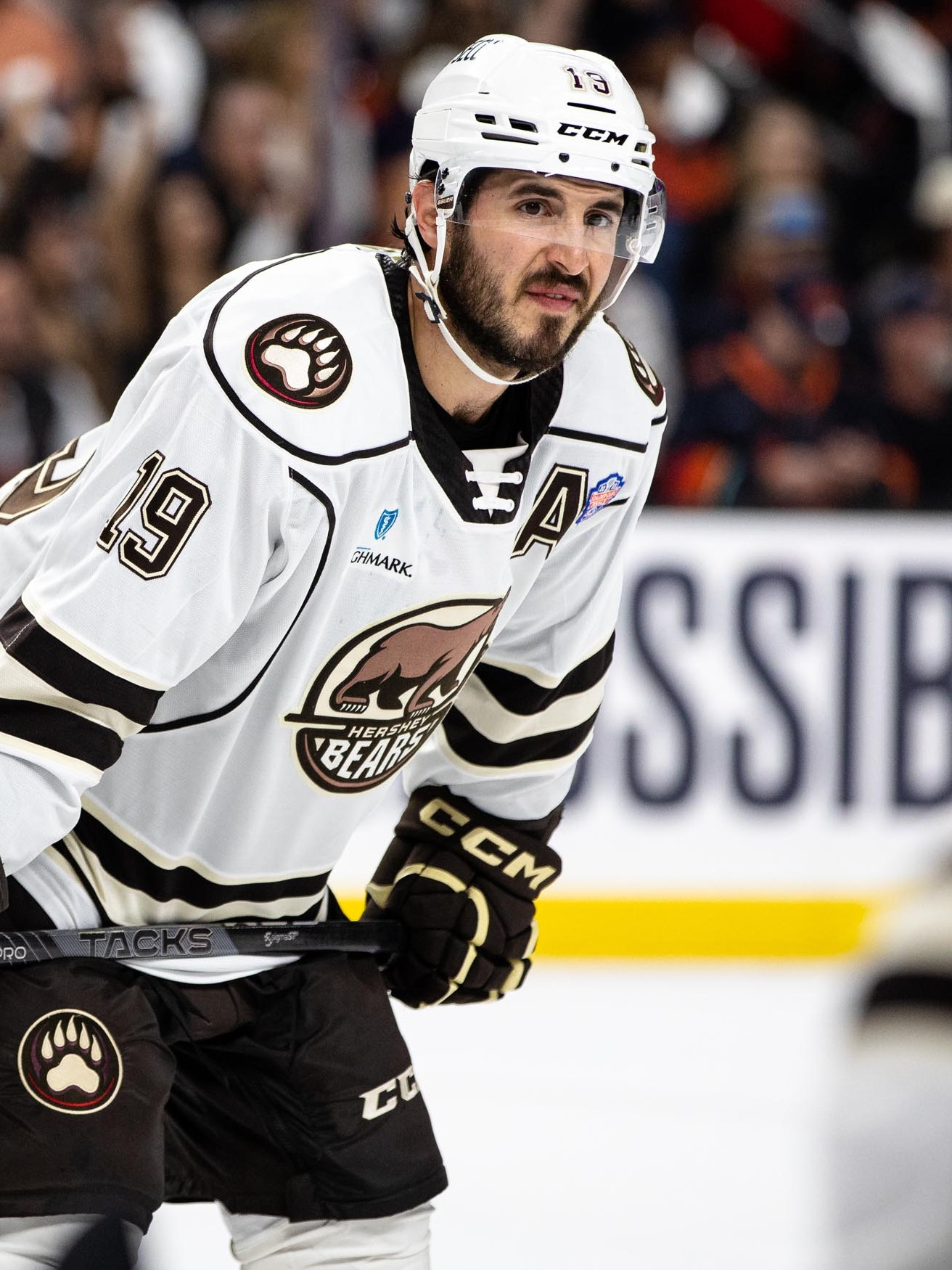
- Vecchione with the Hershey Bears in 2023
- Born: February 25, 1993 (age 33) Saugus, Massachusetts, U.S.
- Height: 5 ft 10 in (178 cm)
- Weight: 194 lb (88 kg; 13 st 12 lb)
- Position: Center
- Shoots: Right
- KHL team Former teams: Torpedo Nizhny Novgorod; Philadelphia Flyers; Washington Capitals; Barys Astana
- NHL draft: Undrafted
- Playing career: 2017–present

Michael Vecchione (born February 25, 1993) is an American professional ice hockey center for Torpedo Nizhny Novgorod of the Kontinental Hockey League (KHL).

Prior to turning professional, Vecchione played for Union College where he was named to the All-ECAC Rookie Team, ECAC Hockey All-Tournament Team All-ECAC Hockey Third Team, ECAC Player of the Year and AHCA East First-Team All-American during his four-year career. He won the 2014 NCAA Division I men's ice hockey tournament as a first year and was a Hobey Baker Award finalist as a senior.

== Playing career ==
=== Early career ===
Vecchione began his youth hockey career with the Valley Junior Warriors in Saugus Youth Hockey program. While a member of the 1993 team, the Valley Junior Warriors won four state championships.

While attending Malden Catholic High School, Vecchione was drafted in the 2010 United States Hockey League (USHL) Draft by the Tri-City Storm. That season, as team captain, he led his team to the Super 8 semifinals vs Hingham High School.

On August 21, 2012, while playing for the Storm, Vecchione committed to Union College for the 2013–14 season. He had previously been committed to the University of New Hampshire. On November 6, 2012, Vecchione was named an alternate captain for the Storm after assistant captain Heikki Liedes was injured.

=== Collegiate ===
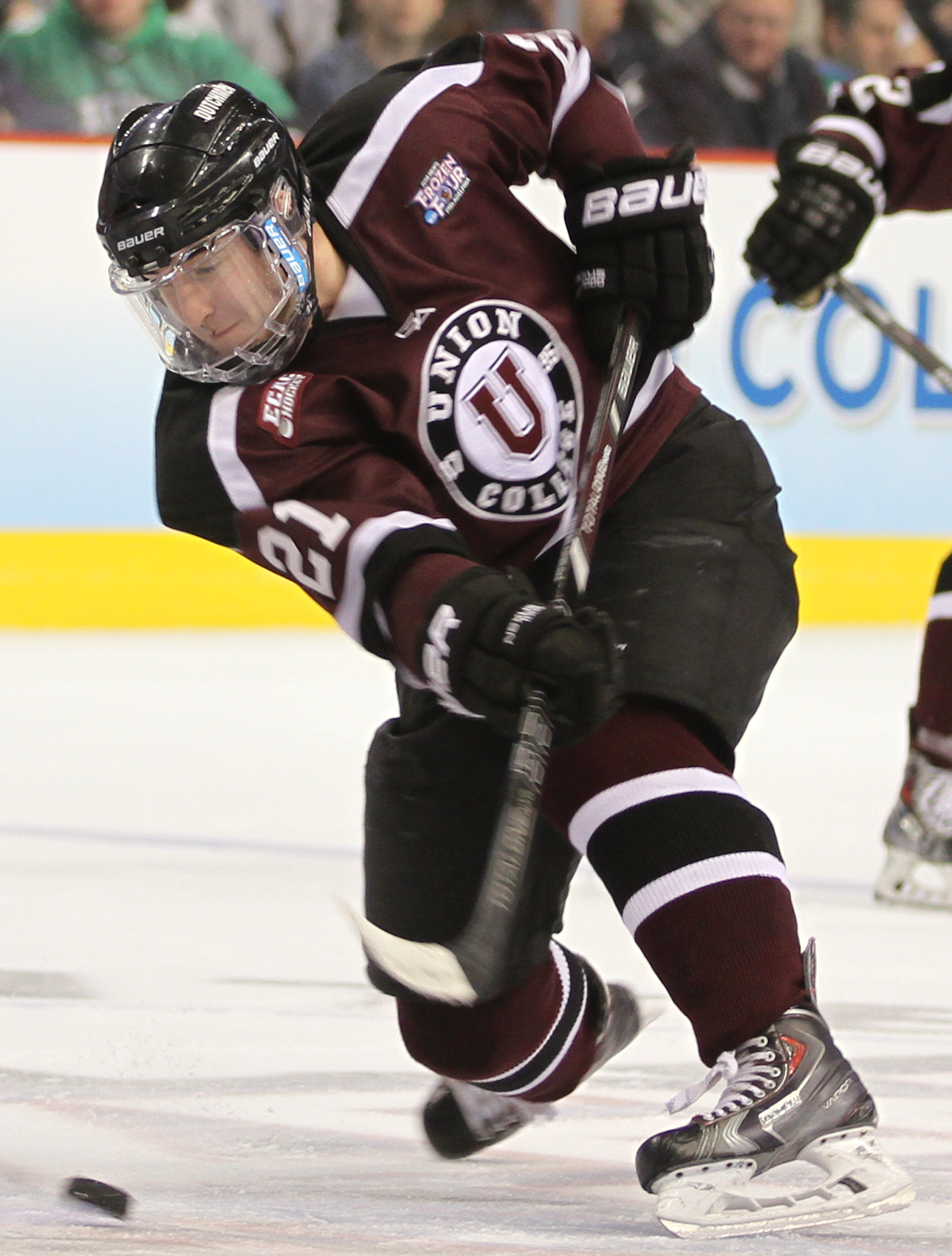
Vecchione with the Union Dutchmen in 2014

In his freshman year at Union, Vecchione led the team rookies in scoring with 34 points in 38 games and ranked fourth across the ECAC. At the conclusion of the season, after having helped lead Union to their first NCAA Division 1 title, he was ranked ninth across the league in rookie scoring and was named to the All-ECAC Rookie Team. He was also named to the ECAC Hockey All-Academic Team and All-Tournament Team.

In his sophomore year, Vecchione was named an alternate captain in December. He led ECAC in assists with 31 in 39 games. Vecchione was selected for the Frozen Holiday Classic All-Tournament Team and was again named to the ECAC Hockey All-Academic Team while majoring in history.

Prior to his junior year, Vecchione was named a co-captain for Union alongside Matt Wilkins, becoming the first captain pairing for Union since 2008. He became the fastest player in Union Division I history to record 100 points when he recorded an assist against Princeton in his 96th career game on January 8, 2016. He became the 26th player in the program's Division 1 history to score 100 points. He was named to the All-ECAC Hockey Third Team on March 18 for the first time in his collegiate career. He ended the season with a team leading 29 points scored in 34 games.

In his last year with Union, Vecchione was again named team captain. On February 3, 2017, Vecchione became Union's all time Division I leading scorer when he recorded his 158th and 159th career point in a 5–3 loss to Cornell. As a result of his breakout season, Vecchione was named a Hobey Baker Award finalist and the ECAC Hockey Player of the Year. He was also named to the All-ECAC Hockey First Team and won Union's William M. Jaffe Award for most outstanding male student-athlete. On June 21, Vecchione was named an AHCA East First-Team All-American.

=== Professional ===
Vecchione signed a one-year entry-level contract with the Philadelphia Flyers on March 31, 2017. He made his NHL debut on April 4, 2017, in a game against the New Jersey Devils.

On July 1, 2017, Vecchione, as a restricted free agent, accepted a two-year, two-way deal to continue with the Philadelphia Flyers. On September 27, 2017, he was loaned to the Flyers American Hockey League (AHL) affiliate, the Lehigh Valley Phantoms to play the 2017–18 season. During the season, Vecchione was named AHL October Rookie of the Month after he recorded 10 points in 10 games. However, due to an injury on December 9 during a game against the Hershey Bears, he was forced to miss more than two weeks to recover. Despite this, Vecchione concluded his first professional season with 40 points in 65 games.

Vecchione attended the Flyers 2018 Training Camp but was reassigned to the AHL on September 20, 2018.

After parts of three seasons in the Flyers organization, Vecchione left as a free agent to sign on a one-year, two-way contract with the St. Louis Blues on July 1, 2019. He attended the Blues 2019 training camp, before he was placed on waivers and assigned to the AHL to join affiliate, the San Antonio Rampage for the 2019–20 season. He led the Rampage with 21 goals and placed second with 36 points before the season was cancelled due to the COVID-19 pandemic.

As a free agent from the Blues after the conclusion of his contract, Vecchione agreed to a one-year, two-way contract to join the Colorado Avalanche on October 9, 2020. In the shortened 2020–21 season, Vecchione was assigned to AHL affiliate, the Colorado Eagles. Limited to 18 games through injury, Vecchione still contributed with 7 goals and 10 points for the Eagles.

Having concluded his contract with the Avalanche, Vecchione as a free agent signed a one-year, two-way contract with the Washington Capitals on August 5, 2021. He signed another one-year, two-way contract with the Capitals on March 28, 2022. Vecchione signed a two-year contract with the Hershey Bears on February 14, 2023.

On June 21, 2023, Vecchione scored the series-winning goal in overtime of game seven of the 2023 Calder Cup Finals. He won another Calder Cup with the Hershey Bears on June 24, 2024.

After four seasons with the Bears, Vecchione left North America as a free agent and opted to initially sign a one-year contract for the 2025–26 season with Russian club, Traktor Chelyabinsk of the KHL, on July 30, 2025. Before commencing his contract in Chelyabinsk, Vecchione was traded to Kazakhstani based KHL club, Barys Astana, in exchange for financial compensation on August 12, 2025.

== Personal life ==
Vecchione was born to parents Diane and Joe and grew up in Saugus with his two older siblings, Michelle and Joe.

== Career statistics ==
			Regular season					Playoffs
Season	Team	League	GP	G	A	Pts	PIM	GP	G	A	Pts	PIM
2011–12	Tri-City Storm	USHL	49	10	19	29	28	2	0	2	2	0
2012–13	Tri-City Storm	USHL	63	26	34	60	75	—	—	—	—	—
2013–14	Union Dutchmen	ECAC	38	14	20	34	32	—	—	—	—	—
2014–15	Union Dutchmen	ECAC	39	19	31	50	18	—	—	—	—	—
2015–16	Union Dutchmen	ECAC	34	9	20	29	30	—	—	—	—	—
2016–17	Union Dutchmen	ECAC	38	29	34	63	45	—	—	—	—	—
2016–17	Philadelphia Flyers	NHL	2	0	0	0	0	—	—	—	—	—
2017–18	Lehigh Valley Phantoms	AHL	65	17	23	40	24	12	3	4	7	2
2018–19	Lehigh Valley Phantoms	AHL	67	15	23	38	36	—	—	—	—	—
2019–20	San Antonio Rampage	AHL	61	21	15	36	23	—	—	—	—	—
2020–21	Colorado Eagles	AHL	18	7	3	10	2	2	0	1	1	2
2021–22	Hershey Bears	AHL	59	16	28	44	37	3	0	1	1	0
2021–22	Washington Capitals	NHL	1	0	0	0	0	—	—	—	—	—
2022–23	Hershey Bears	AHL	68	23	32	55	25	20	5	3	8	2
2023–24	Hershey Bears	AHL	67	17	21	38	33	20	2	8	10	14
2024–25	Hershey Bears	AHL	68	19	20	39	16	8	3	1	4	6
2025–26	Barys Astana	KHL	65	19	27	46	32	—	—	—	—	—
NHL totals			3	0	0	0	0	—	—	—	—	—
KHL totals			65	19	27	46	32	—	—	—	—	—

== Awards and honors ==
Award	Year
College
ECAC All Academic Team	2014, 2015, 2016
All-ECAC Hockey Rookie Team	2013–14
ECAC Hockey All-Tournament Team	2014
NCAA Division I Men's Ice Hockey Championship	2014
All-ECAC Hockey Third Team	2015–16
AHCA East First-Team All-American	2016–17
ECAC Player of the Year	2017
Hobey Baker Award Finalist	2017
AHL
AHL Rookie of the Month October	2017–18
Calder Cup	2023, 2024

Awards and achievements
Preceded by Jimmy Vesey	ECAC Hockey Player of the Year; 2016–17	Succeeded by Ryan Donato
Preceded by Kyle Connor	NCAA Ice Hockey Scoring Champion with Zach Aston-Reese and Tyler Kelleher; 2016–17	Succeeded by Adam Gaudette
Preceded by Mark Jankowski	AHL Rookie of the Month; October 2017	Succeeded by Dylan Strome
