= 2018 Calder Cup playoffs =

North American ice hockey tournament

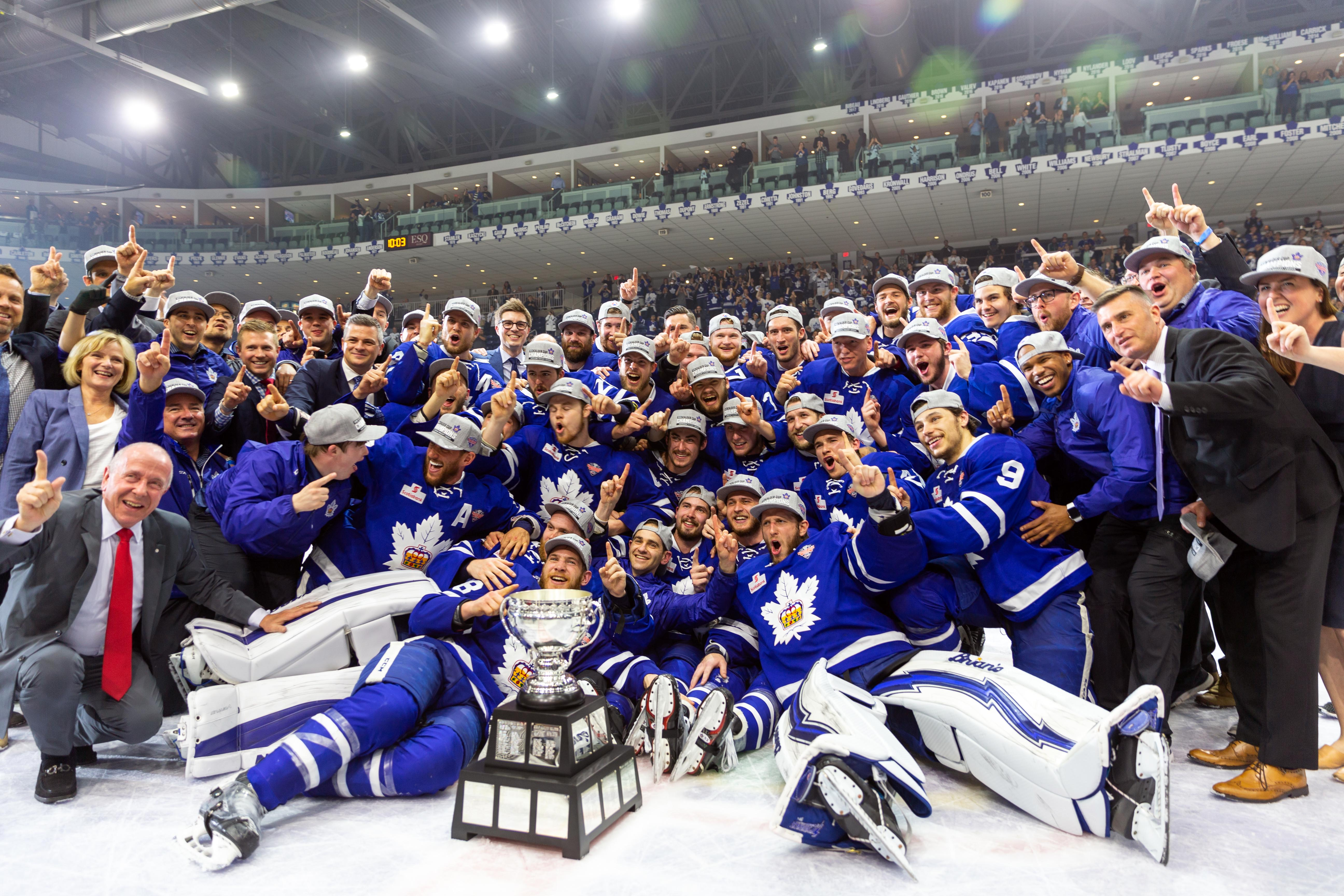
- The champion Toronto Marlies

Tournament details
- Dates: April 19 – June 14, 2018
- Teams: 16

Final positions
- Champions: Toronto Marlies
- Runners-up: Texas Stars

Tournament statistics
- Scoring leader(s): Andreas Johnsson (Marlies) (24 points)

Awards
- MVP: Andreas Johnsson (Marlies)

The 2018 Calder Cup playoffs of the American Hockey League began on April 19, 2018, with the playoff format that was introduced in 2016. The sixteen teams that qualified, eight from each conference, played best-of-five series in the division semifinals, with the playoffs continuing with best-of-seven series for the division finals, conference finals, and Calder Cup finals.

A Division finals game between the Lehigh Valley Phantoms and the Charlotte Checkers became the longest game in AHL history by going 86:48 into overtime when Alex Krushelnyski of the Phantoms scored the winning 2–1 goal. The game started at 7:03 pm on May 9 and ended at 1:09 am on May 10. The Checkers had 95 shots on goal and Alex Lyon would finish with 94 saves, while Alex Nedeljkovic would finish with 51 saves on 53 shots. The previous record of 82:58 into overtime was set in 2008, also between the AHL affiliates of the Philadelphia Flyers and the Carolina Hurricanes.

The Toronto Marlies won their first Calder Cup, beating the Texas Stars four games to three in the finals.

== Playoff seeds ==
After the 2017–18 AHL regular season, 16 teams qualified for the playoffs. The top four teams in each division ranked by points percentage (points earned divided by points available) qualify for the 2018 Calder Cup Playoffs. The Toronto Marlies were the first team to clinch a playoff spot and went on to claim the regular season title with four games remaining.

=== Eastern Conference ===
==== Atlantic Division ====
1. Lehigh Valley Phantoms – 104 points (.684)
2. Wilkes-Barre/Scranton Penguins – 99 points (.651)
3. Charlotte Checkers – 96 points (.632)
4. Providence Bruins – 95 points (.625)

==== North Division ====
1. Toronto Marlies– 112 points (.737)
2. Syracuse Crunch – 100 points (.658)
3. Rochester Americans – 91 points (.599)
4. Utica Comets – 88 points (.579)

=== Western Conference ===
==== Central Division ====
1. Chicago Wolves – 95 points (.625)
2. Grand Rapids Griffins – 93 points (.612)
3. Manitoba Moose – 92 points (.605)
4. Rockford IceHogs – 88 points (.579)

==== Pacific Division ====
1. Tucson Roadrunners – 90 points (.662)
2. Texas Stars – 90 points (.592)
3. Ontario Reign – 79 points (.581)
4. San Jose Barracuda – 76 points (.559), 33 ROWs

== Bracket ==
Division semifinals	Division finals
A1	Lehigh Valley	3
A4	Providence	1
A1	Lehigh Valley	4
A3	Charlotte	1
A2	Wilkes-Barre/Scranton	0
A3	Charlotte	3
Eastern Conference
N1	Toronto	3
N4	Utica	2
N1	Toronto	4
N2	Syracuse	0
N2	Syracuse	3
N3	Rochester	0
C1	Chicago	0
C4	Rockford	3
C4	Rockford	4
C3	Manitoba	0
C2	Grand Rapids	2
C3	Manitoba	3
Western Conference
P1	Tucson	3
P4	San Jose	1
P1	Tucson	1
P2	Texas	4
P2	Texas	3
P3	Ontario	1

Conference finals
A1	Lehigh Valley	0
N1	Toronto	4
C4	Rockford	2
P2	Texas	4

Calder Cup final
N1	Toronto	4
P2	Texas	3

== Division semifinals ==
Note 1: Home team is listed first.
Note 2: Higher-seeded team had the choice of games 1, 2, and 5 at home or games 3, 4, and 5 at home.

=== Eastern Conference ===
==== (A1) Lehigh Valley Phantoms vs. (A4) Providence Bruins ====
April 20	Providence Bruins	2 – 3	Lehigh Valley Phantoms	Dunkin' Donuts Center	Recap
Ryan Fitzgerald (1) – pp – 17:38		First period	17:54 – Danick Martel (1)
Ryan Fitzgerald (2) – 3:35		Second period	14:32 – pp – Greg Carey (1); 15:13 – pp – Danick Martel (2)
No scoring		Third period	No scoring
Zane McIntyre (21 saves / 24 shots		Goalie stats	Alex Lyon (39 saves / 41 shots)

April 21	Providence Bruins	5 – 3	Lehigh Valley Phantoms	Dunkin' Donuts Center	Recap
Anton Blidh (1) – 2:07; Peter Cehlarik (1) – 5:08		First period	No scoring
No scoring		Second period	9:46 – pp – Mark Friedman (1); 10:57 – Mike Vecchione (1)
Jordan Szwarz (1) – sh – 0:19; Peter Cehlarik (2) – pp – 11:35; Jakob Forsbacka Karlsson (1) – en– 18:27		Third period	15:09 – Greg Carey (2)
Jordan Binnington (23 saves / 26 shots)		Goalie stats	Alex Lyon (31 saves / 35 shots)

April 27	Lehigh Valley Phantoms	4 – 1	Providence Bruins	PPL Center	Recap
Philippe Myers (1) – 6:05; Oskar Lindblom (1) – sh – 12:50		First period	No scoring
Oskar Lindblom (2) – pp – 2:06		Second period	13:42 – pp – Austin Czarnik (1)
Mike Vecchione (2) – 15:16		Third period	No scoring
Dustin Tokarski (30 saves / 31 shots)		Goalie stats	Jordan Binnington (30 saves / 34 shots)

April 28	Lehigh Valley Phantoms	4 – 3	OT	Providence Bruins	PPL Center	Recap
T. J. Brennan (1) – 7:27; Chris Conner (1) – 8:04; Chris Conner (2) – 16:26		First period		No scoring
No scoring		Second period		17:34 – Tommy Cross (1)
No scoring		Third period		12:00 – Anton Blidh (2); 14:59 – Austin Czarnik (2)
Maxim Lamarche (1) – 18:36		First overtime period		No scoring
Alex Lyon (49 saves / 52 shots)		Goalie stats		Jordan Binnington (11 saves / 14 shots); Zane McIntyre (13 saves / 14 shots)

Lehigh Valley won series 3–1

==== (A2) Wilkes-Barre/Scranton Penguins vs. (A3) Charlotte Checkers ====
April 20	Charlotte Checkers	3 – 2	OT	Wilkes-Barre/Scranton Penguins	Bojangles' Coliseum	Recap
No scoring		First period		17:44 – pp – Andrey Pedan (1)
No scoring		Second period		11:16 – Daniel Sprong (1)
Aleksi Saarela (1) – 6:32; Valentin Zykov (1) – pp – 11:45		Third period		No scoring
Lucas Wallmark (1) – 3:18		First overtime period		No scoring
Alex Nedeljkovic (25 saves / 27 shots)		Goalie stats		Tristan Jarry (35 saves / 38 shots)

April 21	Charlotte Checkers	4 – 1	Wilkes-Barre/Scranton Penguins	Bojangles' Coliseum	Recap
Haydn Fleury (1) – 13:47		First period	0:22 – Joseph Cramarossa (1)
No scoring		Second period	No scoring
Josiah Didier (1) – 14:18; Clark Bishop (1) – en – 18:38; Haydn Fleury (2) – en – 18:52		Third period	No scoring
Alex Nedeljkovic (27 saves / 28 shots)		Goalie stats	Tristan Jarry (24 saves / 26 shots)

April 26	Wilkes-Barre/Scranton Penguins	3 – 7	Charlotte Checkers	Mohegan Sun Arena at Casey Plaza	Recap
Anthony Angello (1) – 4:40; Adam Johnson (2) – 7:29		First period	16:41 – Lucas Wallmark (2); 17:02 – Greg McKegg (1)
No scoring		Second period	17:46 – Aleksi Saarela (2)
Anthony Angello (2) – 13:31		Third period	5:55 – Clark Bishop (2); 7:36 – Andrew Miller (1); 18:26 – en – Andrew Poturalski (1); 18:44 – en – Janne Kuokkanen (1)
Tristan Jarry (25 saves / 30 shots)		Goalie stats	Alex Nedeljkovic (26 saves / 29 shots)

Charlotte won series 3–0

==== (N1) Toronto Marlies vs. (N4) Utica Comets ====
April 21	Toronto Marlies	3 – 2	OT	Utica Comets	Ricoh Coliseum	Recap
No scoring		First period		No scoring
Jeremy Bracco (1) – 10:29		Second period		No scoring
Justin Holl (1) — 14:45		Third period		6:17 – pp – Zack MacEwen (1); 19:24 – Michael Chaput (1)
Chris Mueller (1) – pp – 17:48		First overtime period		No scoring
Garret Sparks (32 saves / 34 shots)		Goalie stats		Thatcher Demko (44 saves / 47 shots)

April 22	Toronto Marlies	5 – 2	Utica Comets	Ricoh Coliseum	Recap
Pierre Engvall (1) – 5:51; Dmytro Timashov (1) – pp – 16:47		First period	12:05 – Cam Darcy (1)
No scoring		Second period	No scoring
Colin Greening (1) – 2:16; Carl Grundstrom (1) – 11:20; Trevor Moore (1) – en – 19:00		Third period	1:38 – pp – Michael Chaput (2)
Garret Sparks (21 saves / 23 shots)		Goalie stats	Thatcher Demko (24 saves / 28 shots

April 25	Utica Comets	5 – 2	Toronto Marlies	Adirondack Bank Center	Recap
Reid Boucher (1) – pp – 7:55; Wacey Hamilton (1) – 9:47; Cole Cassels (1) – 13:59		First period	No scoring
No scoring		Second period	No scoring
Tyler Motte (1) – 14:35; Cole Cassels (2) – en – 18:20		Third period	10:29 – pp – Calle Rosen (1); 16:09 – sh – Colin Greening (2)
Thatcher Demko (35 saves / 37 shots)		Goalie stats	Garret Sparks (4 saves / 7 shots); Calvin Pickard (19 saves / 20 shots)

April 27	Utica Comets	5 – 2	Toronto Marlies	Adirondack Bank Center	Recap
Reid Boucher (2) – 1:03		First period	No scoring
Tanner MacMaster (1) – 2:55; Reid Boucher (3) – 17:29		Second period	No scoring
Michael Carcone (1) – pp – 2:26; Tyler Motte (2) – 12:12		Third period	0:47 – pp – Dmytro Timashov (2); 15:30 – Pierre Engvall (2)
Thatcher Demko (40 saves / 42 shots)		Goalie stats	Garret Sparks (15 saves / 20 shots)

April 29	Toronto Marlies	4 – 0	Utica Comets	Ricoh Coliseum	Recap
Carl Grundstrom (2) – pp – 3:34		First period	No scoring
Carl Grundstrom (3) – 12:33		Second period	No scoring
Andreas Johnsson (1) – pp – 0:56; Dmytro Timashov (3) – en – 17:49		Third period	No scoring
Garret Sparks (37 saves / 37 shots)		Goalie stats	Thatcher Demko (34 saves / 37 shots)

Toronto won series 3–2

==== (N2) Syracuse Crunch vs. (N3) Rochester Americans ====
April 20	Syracuse Crunch	6 – 2	Rochester Americans	Oncenter War Memorial Arena	Recap
Gabriel Dumont (1) – 3:22; Jamie McBain (1) – 11:15		First period	4:12 – pp – Zach Redmond (1); 19:08 – Kyle Criscuolo (1)
Dominik Masin (1) – 1:44		Second period	No scoring
Brendan Bradley (1) – 8:27; Gabriel Dumont (2) – pp – 14:46; Gabriel Dumont (3) – en – 19:08		Third period	No scoring
Edward Pasquale (28 saves / 30 shots)		Goalie stats	Linus Ullmark (28 saves / 33 shots)

April 21	Syracuse Crunch	6 – 5	Rochester Americans	Oncenter War Memorial Arena	Recap
Matthew Peca (1) – pp – 3:48; Mathieu Joseph (1) – 18:31		First period	15:43 – pp – Colin Blackwell (1)
Olivier Archambault (1) – 1:29; Reid McNeill (1) – 6:15		Second period	5:10 – sh – Justin Bailey (1); 6:02 – Stuart Percy (1)
Alexander Volkov (1) – 4:52; Alexander Volkov (2) – 5:59		Third period	5:22 – Kevin Porter (1); 6:58 – Nicholas Baptiste (1)
Edward Pasquale (20 saves / 25 shots)		Goalie stats	Linus Ullmark (16 saves / 22 shots)

April 25	Rochester Americans	3 – 6	Syracuse Crunch	Blue Cross Arena	Recap
Zach Redmond (2) – pp – 3:25		First period	19:16 – Matthew Peca (2)
Justin Bailey (2) – 7:48		Second period	8:17 – Cal Foote (1); 8:36 – Olivier Archambault (2); 10:49 – Mitchell Stephens (1)
Danny O'Regan (1) – 13:50		Third period	6:05 – pp – Mathieu Joseph (2); 19:08 – en – Alexander Volkov (3)
Linus Ullmark (20 saves / 25 shots)		Goalie stats	Connor Ingram (33 saves / 36 shots)

Syracuse won series 3–0

=== Western Conference ===
==== (C1) Chicago Wolves vs. (C4) Rockford IceHogs ====
April 21	Chicago Wolves	1 – 2	Rockford IceHogs	Allstate Arena	Recap
No scoring		First period	9:42 – pp – Tyler Sikura (1)
No scoring		Second period	2:05 – pp – Adam Clendening (1)
Teemu Pulkkinen (1) – pp – 5:31		Third period	No scoring
Oscar Dansk (27 saves / 29 shots)		Goalie stats	Collin Delia (31 saves / 32 shots)

April 22	Rockford IceHogs	5 – 2	Chicago Wolves	BMO Harris Bank Center	Recap
William Pelletier (1) – 13:24; Luke Johnson (1) – pp – 19:08		First period	9:12 – Wade Megan (1); 19:59 – pp – Zac Leslie (1)
Matthew Highmore (1) – pp – 3:47; Chris DiDomenico (1) – pp – 16:04		Second period	No scoring
Lance Bouma (1) – en – 19:21		Third period	No scoring
Collin Delia (28 saves / 30 shots)		Goalie stats	Oscar Dansk (24 saves / 28 shots)

April 26	Chicago Wolves	3 – 4	3OT	Rockford IceHogs	Allstate Arena	Recap
Philip Holm (1) – 8:48		First period		No scoring
Keegan Kolesar (1) – 8:02		Second period		9:50 – pp – Cody Franson (1); 13:00 – Chris DiDomenico (2); 13:54 – Victor Ejdsell (1)
Wade Megan (2) – 3:11		Third period		No scoring
No scoring		Third overtime period		17:22 – pp – Victor Ejdsell (2)
Maxime Lagace (72 saves / 76 shots)		Goalie stats		Collin Delia (52 saves / 55 shots)

Rockford won series 3–0

==== (C2) Grand Rapids Griffins vs. (C3) Manitoba Moose ====
April 21	Manitoba Moose	3 – 2	Grand Rapids Griffins	Bell MTS Place	Recap
No scoring		First period	12:42 – Ben Street (1)
No scoring		Second period	No scoring
Jan Kostalek (1) – 6:22; Cameron Schilling (1) – 13:12; Michael Spacek (1) – pp – 18:51		Third period	12:41 – Turner Elson (1)
Eric Comrie (34 saves / 36 shots)		Goalie stats	Tom McCollum (28 saves / 31 shots)

April 22	Manitoba Moose	1 – 5	Grand Rapids Griffins	Bell MTS Place	Recap
Francis Beauvillier (1) – 2:43		First period	6:40 – pp – Matthew Ford (1); 11:33 – pp – Eric Tangradi (1); 13:08 – Turner Elson (2); 18:56 – Ben Street (2)
No scoring		Second period	13:24 – Evgeny Svechnikov (1)
No scoring		Third period	No scoring
Eric Comrie (19 saves / 24 shots); Jamie Phillips (15 saves / 15 shots)		Goalie stats	Tom McCollum (21 saves / 22 shots)

April 25	Grand Rapids Griffins	3 – 6	Manitoba Moose	Van Andel Arena	Recap
Ben Street (3) – pp – 15:28		First period	4:16 – Michael Sgarbossa (1); 8:25 – pp – Nic Petan (1)
Eric Tangradi (2) – 1:43; Zach Nastasiuk (1) – 4:49		Second period	1:05 – Sami Niku (1); 2:26 – Skyler McKenzie (1)
No scoring		Third period	18:02 – en – Chase De Leo (1); 19:53 – en – Brendan Lemieux (1)
Tom McCollum (8 saves / 11 shots); Jared Coreau (11 saves / 12 shots)		Goalie stats	Eric Comrie (45 saves / 48 shots)

April 26	Grand Rapids Griffins	3 – 0	Manitoba Moose	Van Andel Arena	Recap
No scoring		First period	No scoring
Matthew Ford (2) – 18:25; Ben Street (4) – 19:40		Second period	No scoring
Brian Lashoff (1) – en – 17:04		Third period	No scoring
Jared Coreau (25 saves / 25 shots)		Goalie stats	Eric Comrie (21 saves / 23 shots)

April 30	Grand Rapids Griffins	1 – 5	Manitoba Moose	Van Andel Arena	Recap
Matt Puempel (1) – pp – 6:53		First period	1:49 – Patrice Cormier (1)
No scoring		Second period	19:46 – Cameron Schilling (2)
No scoring		Third period	6:39 – Michael Sgarbossa (2); 11:17 – Brendan Lemieux (2); 16:31 – en – Chase De Leo (2)
Jared Coreau (25 saves / 29 shots)		Goalie stats	Eric Comrie (34 saves / 35 shots)

Manitoba won series 3–2

==== (P1) Tucson Roadrunners vs. (P4) San Jose Barracuda ====
April 19	San Jose Barracuda	2 – 4	Tucson Roadrunners	SAP Center	Recap
No scoring		First period	11:04 – Dakota Mermis (1)
Alexander True (1) – pp – 9:33		Second period	9:56 – Ryan MacInnis (1)
Alexander Chmelevski (1) – 5:16		Third period	18:45 – Lane Pederson (1); 19:46 – en – Dylan Strome (1)
Antoine Bibeau (20 saves / 23 shots)		Goalie stats	Adin Hill (36 saves / 38 shots)

April 21	San Jose Barracuda	6 – 3	Tucson Roadrunners	SAP Center	Recap
Rudolfs Balcers (1) – 1:25; Adam Helewka (1) – pp – 11:45; Rourke Chartier (1) – 15:08		First period	4:18 – Dylan Strome (2); 6:16 – Dylan Strome (3)
No scoring		Second period	6:36 – Mario Kempe (1)
Rudolfs Balcers (2) – 3:45; Manuel Wiederer (1) – 16:00; Rourke Chartier (2) – en – 18:28		Third period	No scoring
Antoine Bibeau (22 saves / 25 shots)		Goalie stats	Adin Hill (26 saves / 31 shots)

April 25	Tucson Roadrunners	6 – 0	San Jose Barracuda	Tucson Convention Center	Recap
Michael Bunting (1) – 2:27; Lawson Crouse (1) – pp – 12:47; Lane Pederson (2) – 16:16		First period	No scoring
Mike Sislo (1) – 6:53; Andrew Campbell (1) – 14:19		Second period	No scoring
Mario Kempe (2) – 0:53		Third period	No scoring
Adin Hill (21 saves / 21 shots)		Goalie stats	Antoine Bibeau (10 saves / 15 shots); Stephon Williams (7 saves / 8 shots)

April 27	Tucson Roadrunners	3 – 0	San Jose Barracuda	Tucson Convention Center	Recap
No scoring		First period	No scoring
Mario Kempe (3) – 4:24		Second period	No scoring
Conor Garland (1) – 4:53; Mario Kempe (4) – en – 19:00		Third period	No scoring
Adin Hill (25 saves / 25 shots)		Goalie stats	Antoine Bibeau (31 saves / 33 shots)

Tucson won series 3–1

==== (P2) Texas Stars vs. (P3) Ontario Reign ====
April 19	Texas Stars	4 – 3	OT	Ontario Reign	H-E-B Center	Recap
Sheldon Dries (1) – 3:17		First period		No scoring
No scoring		Second period		10:58 – Justin Auger (1); 13:52 – Jonny Brodzinski (1)
Denis Guryanov (1) – 8:34; Travis Morin (1) – 13:22		Third period		18:44 – Matt Moulson (1)
Brian Flynn (1) – 1:55		First overtime period		No scoring
Mike McKenna (38 saves / 41 shots)		Goalie stats		Cal Petersen (26 saves / 30 shots)

April 20	Texas Stars	1 – 5	Ontario Reign	H-E-B Center	Recap
No scoring		First period	16:33 – pp – Philippe Maillet (1); 19:32 – Matt Luff (1)
No scoring		Second period	16:38 – T. J. Hensick (1)
Brian Flynn (2) – pp – 14:27		Third period	15:15 – Philippe Maillet (2); 16:21 – en – Oscar Fantenberg (1)
Mike McKenna (27 saves / 31 shots)		Goalie stats	Cal Petersen (28 saves / 29 shots)

April 22	Ontario Reign	4 – 5	2OT	Texas Stars	Citizens Business Bank Arena	Recap
Matt Roy (1) – 8:30; Sean Walker (1) – 11:06		First period		14:14 – Remi Elie (1)
Michael Mersch (1) – pp – 0:27; Michael Amadio (1) – 9:19		Second period		5:32 – pp – Justin Dowling (1); 7:02 – Colin Markison (1)
No scoring		Third period		3:32 – Travis Morin (2)
No scoring		Second overtime period		17:38 – Samuel Laberge (1)
Cal Petersen (39 saves / 44 shots)		Goalie stats		Landon Bow (18 saves / 22 shots); Mike McKenna (44 saves / 44 shots)

April 24	Ontario Reign	0 – 1	Texas Stars	Citizens Business Bank Arena	Recap
No scoring		First period	No scoring
No scoring		Second period	No scoring
No scoring		Third period	6:54 – Denis Guryanov (2)
Cal Petersen (25 saves / 26 shots)		Goalie stats	Mike McKenna (47 saves / 47 shots)

Texas won series 3–1

== Division finals ==
Note: Home team is listed first.

=== Eastern Conference ===
==== (A1) Lehigh Valley Phantoms vs. (A3) Charlotte Checkers ====
May 4	Lehigh Valley Phantoms	2 – 1	Charlotte Checkers	PPL Center	Recap
No scoring		First period	15:26 – Valentin Zykov (2)
Alex Krushelnyski (1) – 6:17		Second period	No scoring
Greg Carey (3) – pp – 18:17		Third period	No scoring
Alex Lyon (29 saves / 30 shots)		Goalie stats	Alex Nedeljkovic (30 saves / 32 shots)

May 5	Lehigh Valley Phantoms	0 – 6	Charlotte Checkers	PPL Center	Recap
No scoring		First period	6:04 – pp – Janne Kuokkanen (2); 16:02 – Lucas Wallmark (3)
No scoring		Second period	13:30 – Philip Samuelsson (1); 19:04 – pp – Valentin Zykov (3)
No scoring		Third period	19:18 – pp – Janne Kuokkanen (3); 19:50 – pp – Julien Gauthier (1)
Dustin Tokarski (17 saves / 23 shots)		Goalie stats	Alex Nedeljkovic (26 saves / 26 shots)

May 8	Charlotte Checkers	1 – 5	Lehigh Valley Phantoms	Bojangles' Coliseum	Recap
No scoring		First period	3:16 – Mike Vecchione (3); 4:40 – Danick Martel (3)
Valentin Zykov (4) – pp – 3:40		Second period	5:37 – Chris Conner (3); 12:52 – pp – Oskar Lindblom (3)
No scoring		Third period	16:38 – en – Oskar Lindblom (4)
Alex Nedeljkovic (11 saves / 15 shots); Jeremy Smith (4 saves / 4 shots)		Goalie stats	Alex Lyon (34 saves / 35 shots)

May 9 (Note: Game 4 became the longest game in AHL history by going 86:48 into overtime. The previous record of 82:58 into overtime was set in 2008.)	Charlotte Checkers	1 – 2	5OT	Lehigh Valley Phantoms	Bojangles' Coliseum	Recap
No scoring		First period		16:24 – Danick Martel (4)
Patrick Brown (1) – 6:52		Second period		No scoring
No scoring		Third period		No scoring
No scoring		Fifth overtime period		6:48 – Alex Krushelnyski (2)
Alex Nedeljkovic (51 saves / 53 shots)		Goalie stats		Alex Lyon (94 saves / 95 shots)

May 12	Charlotte Checkers	1 – 5	Lehigh Valley Phantoms	Bojangles' Coliseum	Recap
No scoring		First period	9:22 – Corban Knight (1)
No scoring		Second period	13:56 – Chris Conner (4); 17:02 – Tyrell Goulbourne (1)
Roland McKeown (1) – 5:58		Third period	4:04 – Philippe Myers (2); 7:18 – Colin McDonald (1)
Alex Nedeljkovic (19 saves / 24 shots)		Goalie stats	Alex Lyon (27 saves / 28 shots)

Lehigh Valley won series 4–1

==== (N1) Toronto Marlies vs. (N2) Syracuse Crunch ====
May 3	Toronto Marlies	6 – 4	Syracuse Crunch	Ricoh Coliseum	Recap
Adam Brooks (1) – 8:33; Dmytro Timashov (4) – pp – 19:16		First period	18:34 – sh – Mathieu Joseph (3)
Travis Dermott (1) – pp – 15:15		Second period	10:55 – pp – Carter Verhaeghe (1)
Mason Marchment (1) – 7:56; Pierre Engvall (3) – 12:46; Ben Smith (1) – en – 19:22		Third period	8:53 – Kevin Lynch (1); 18:55 – Kevin Lynch (2)
Garret Sparks (28 saves / 32 shots)		Goalie stats	Edward Pasquale (15 saves / 20 shots)

May 5	Toronto Marlies	2 – 1	2OT	Syracuse Crunch	Ricoh Coliseum	Recap
No scoring		First period		No scoring
No scoring		Second period		9:25 – Matthew Peca (3)
Mason Marchment (2) – 6:52		Third period		No scoring
Frederik Gauthier (1) – 15:10		Second overtime period		No scoring
Garret Sparks (46 saves / 47 shots)		Goalie stats		Connor Ingram (55 saves / 57 shots)

May 6	Syracuse Crunch	1 – 7	Toronto Marlies	Oncenter War Memorial Arena	Recap
No scoring		First period	3:23 – Chris Mueller (2); 4:35 – Carl Grundstrom (4)
Erik Cernak (1) – 17:14		Second period	10:39 – Miro Aaltonen (1); 14:05 – Colin Greening (3)
No scoring		Third period	8:23 – Trevor Moore (2); 15:08 – Andreas Johnsson (2); 18:20 – Trevor Moore (3)
Connor Ingram (23 saves / 30 shots)		Goalie stats	Calvin Pickard (18 saves / 19 shots)

May 8	Syracuse Crunch	1 – 2	Toronto Marlies	Oncenter War Memorial Arena	Recap
No scoring		First period	4:52 – pp – Dmytro Timashov (5); 14:56 – pp – Andreas Johnsson (3)
No scoring		Second period	No scoring
Reid McNeill (2) – 10:29		Third period	No scoring
Connor Ingram (21 saves / 23 shots)		Goalie stats	Garret Sparks (21 saves / 22 shots)

Toronto won series 4–0

=== Western Conference ===
==== (C3) Manitoba Moose vs. (C4) Rockford IceHogs ====
May 4	Manitoba Moose	2 – 4	Rockford IceHogs	Bell MTS Place	Recap
Buddy Robinson (1) – 16:56		First period	No scoring
No scoring		Second period	11:53 – Victor Ejdsell (3)
Jan Kostalek (2) – 19:33		Third period	3:29 – pp – Tyler Sikura (2); 4:14 – John Hayden (1); 19:02 – pp, en – Cody Franson (2)
Eric Comrie (27 saves / 30 shots)		Goalie stats	Collin Delia (24 saves / 26 shots)

May 5	Manitoba Moose	1 – 4	Rockford IceHogs	Bell MTS Place	Recap
Brendan Lemieux (3) – 16:03		First period	18:38 – Tyler Sikura (3)
No scoring		Second period	4:45 – pp – Chris DiDomenico (3); 16:03 – Carl Dahlstrom (1)
No scoring		Third period	19:51 – en – Andreas Martinsen (1)
Eric Comrie (18 saves / 21 shots)		Goalie stats	Collin Delia (33 saves / 34 shots)

May 9	Rockford IceHogs	4 – 1	Manitoba Moose	BMO Harris Bank Center	Recap
No scoring		First period	No scoring
Tyler Sikura (4) – pp – 6:26; Victor Ejdsell (4) – 7:33		Second period	1:19 – Julian Melchiori (1)
William Pelletier (2) – 13:52; Matthew Highmore (2) – 18:46		Third period	No scoring
Collin Delia (36 saves / 37 shots)		Goalie stats	Eric Comrie (37 saves / 40 shots)

May 11	Rockford IceHogs	6 – 3	Manitoba Moose	BMO Harris Bank Center	Recap
Cody Franson (3) – pp – 5:37; Chris DiDomenico (4) – 13:40		First period	13:09 – Julian Melchiori (2); 17:50 – sh – JC Lipon (1)
Carl Dahlstrom (2) – pp – 1:35; Victor Ejdsell (5) – pp, ps – 11:24; Cody Franson (4) – pp – 17:07		Second period	No scoring
Andreas Martinsen (2) – en – 16:07		Third period	19:50 – Jake Kulevich (1)
Collin Delia (35 saves / 38 shots)		Goalie stats	Eric Comrie (30 saves / 35 shots)

Rockford won series 4–0

==== (P1) Tucson Roadrunners vs. (P2) Texas Stars ====
May 2	Tucson Roadrunners	2 – 1	OT	Texas Stars	Tucson Convention Center	Recap
No scoring		First period		No scoring
Michael Bunting (2) – pp – 13:40		Second period		No scoring
No scoring		Third period		16:25 – pp – Brian Flynn (3)
Michael Bunting (3) – 8:53		First overtime period		No scoring
Adin Hill (23 saves / 24 shots)		Goalie stats		Mike McKenna (34 saves / 36 shots)

May 4	Tucson Roadrunners	1 – 4	Texas Stars	Tucson Convention Center	Recap
No scoring		First period	16:03 – Sheldon Dries (2); 19:21 – Curtis McKenzie (1)
No scoring		Second period	No scoring
Lane Pederson (3) – 8:27		Third period	18:34 – en – Brian Flynn (4); 19:28 – en – Brian Flynn (5)
Adin Hill (28 saves / 30 shots)		Goalie stats	Mike McKenna (32 saves / 33 shots)

May 7	Texas Stars	5 – 4	OT	Tucson Roadrunners	H-E-B Center	Recap
Roope Hintz (1) – 7:48		First period		No scoring
Jason Dickinson (1) – 1:11; Brian Flynn (6) – 9:51; Gavin Bayreuther (1) – 17:08		Second period		0:34 – Dakota Mermis (2); 13:11 – Carter Camper (1)
No scoring		Third period		3:48 – Trevor Murphy (1); 14:24 – Dakota Mermis (3)
Sheldon Dries (3) – 13:36		First overtime period		No scoring
Mike McKenna (33 saves / 37 shots)		Goalie stats		Adin Hill (27 saves / 32 shots)

May 9	Texas Stars	2 – 0	Tucson Roadrunners	H-E-B Center	Recap
No scoring		First period	No scoring
Curtis McKenzie (2) – pp – 12:08; Andrew Bodnarchuk (1) – 15:25		Second period	No scoring
No scoring		Third period	No scoring
Mike McKenna (27 saves / 27 shots)		Goalie stats	Adin Hill (26 saves / 28 shots)

May 11	Texas Stars	3 – 2	OT	Tucson Roadrunners	H-E-B Center	Recap
Colin Markison (2) – 5:20		First period		14:57 – pp – Lawson Crouse (2)
Travis Morin (3) – pp – 16:21		Second period		17:29 – sh – Ryan MacInnis (2)
No scoring		Third period		No scoring
Joel L'Esperance (1) – 8:43		First overtime period		No scoring
Mike McKenna (37 saves / 39 shots)		Goalie stats		Adin Hill (26 saves / 29 shots)

Texas won series 4–1

== Conference finals ==
Note: Home team is listed first.

=== Eastern Conference ===
==== (N1) Toronto Marlies vs. (A1) Lehigh Valley Phantoms ====
May 19	Toronto Marlies	4 – 3	Lehigh Valley Phantoms	Ricoh Coliseum	Recap
Miro Aaltonen (2) – pp – 6:44; Miro Aaltonen (3) – 12:03		First period	16:04 – pp – Philippe Myers (3)
Ben Smith (2) – 16:24		Second period	0:35 – Tyrell Goulbourne (2); 12:57 – pp – Chris Conner (5)
Adam Brooks (2) – 3:18		Third period	No scoring
Garret Sparks (26 saves / 29 shots)		Goalie stats	Alex Lyon (28 saves / 32 shots)

May 20	Toronto Marlies	3 – 2	OT	Lehigh Valley Phantoms	Ricoh Coliseum	Recap
Trevor Moore (4) – pp – 9:34		First period		7:54 – Mark Friedman (2)
No scoring		Second period		No scoring
Carl Grundstrom (5) – 5:35		Third period		5:12 – Mikhail Vorobyev (1)
Miro Aaltonen (4) – 10:59		First overtime period		No scoring
Garret Sparks (35 saves / 37 shots)		Goalie stats		Alex Lyon (44 saves / 47 shots)

May 23	Lehigh Valley Phantoms	0 – 5	Toronto Marlies	PPL Center	Recap
No scoring		First period	1:01 – Carl Grundstrom (6)
No scoring		Second period	4:50 – Andreas Johnsson (4); 12:32 – Mason Marchment (3)
No scoring		Third period	11:08 – pp – Ben Smith (4); 12:29 – pp – Ben Smith (5)
Alex Lyon (23 saves / 26 shots); Dustin Tokarski (6 saves / 8 shots)		Goalie stats	Garret Sparks (16 saves / 16 shots)

May 25	Lehigh Valley Phantoms	1 – 3	Toronto Marlies	PPL Center	Recap
No scoring		First period	No scoring
Travis Sanheim (1) – pp – 13:11		Second period	2:24 – pp – Andreas Johnsson (5)
No scoring		Third period	3:27 – Andreas Johnsson (6); 19:18 – en – Trevor Moore (4)
Alex Lyon (26 saves / 28 shots)		Goalie stats	Garret Sparks (19 saves / 20 shots)

Toronto won series 4–0

=== Western Conference ===
==== (P2) Texas Stars vs. (C4) Rockford IceHogs ====
May 18	Texas Stars	4 – 2	Rockford IceHogs	H-E-B Center	Recap
Curtis McKenzie (3) – 4:22; Roope Hintz (2) – 12:37		First period	11:19 – pp – Carl Dahlstrom (3)
Remi Elie (2) – pp – 8:47		Second period	4:35 – Chris DiDomenico (5)
Sheldon Dries (4) – 7:18		Third period	No scoring
Mike McKenna (31 saves / 33 shots)		Goalie stats	Collin Delia (20 saves / 24 shots)

May 20	Texas Stars	3 – 2	OT	Rockford IceHogs	H-E-B Center	Recap
No scoring		First period		6:09 – John Hayden (2)
Jason Dickinson (2) – 2:45; Brent Regner (1) – pp – 8:15		Second period		11:09 – pp – Chris DiDomenico (6)
No scoring		Third period		No scoring
Curtis McKenzie (4) – pp – 10:46		First overtime period		No scoring
Mike McKenna (24 saves / 26 shots)		Goalie stats		Collin Delia (34 saves / 37 shots)

May 22	Rockford IceHogs	5 – 6	OT	Texas Stars	BMO Harris Bank Center	Recap
Tyler Sikura (5) – 4:43; John Hayden (3) – 12:10		First period		7:13 – pp – Curtis McKenzie (5); 13:24 – Justin Dowling (2); 14:32 – Sheldon Dries (5)
Gustav Forsling (1) – 6:17; Luke Johnson (2) – 12:21		Second period		No scoring
Cody Franson (5) – 19:09		Third period		10:54 – Sheldon Dries (6); 14:30 – Austin Fyten (1)
No scoring		First overtime period		5:12 – Curtis McKenzie (6)
Collin Delia (21 saves / 27 shots)		Goalie stats		Mike McKenna (34 saves / 39 shots)

May 24	Rockford IceHogs	3 – 2	OT	Texas Stars	BMO Harris Bank Center	Recap
Victor Ejdsell (6) – 6:24		First period		15:52 – pp – Travis Morin (4)
No scoring		Second period		19:34 – pp – Matt Mangene (1)
Luke Johnson (3) – 13:02		Third period		No scoring
Victor Ejdsell (7) – pp – 2:32		First overtime period		No scoring
Jeff Glass (28 saves / 30 shots)		Goalie stats		Mike McKenna (33 saves / 36 shots)

May 25	Rockford IceHogs	3 – 1	Texas Stars	BMO Harris Bank Center	Recap
Cody Franson (6) – 3:01; Luke Johnson (4) – 8:15		First period	No scoring
No scoring		Second period	9:17 – Roope Hintz (3)
David Kampf (1) – 11:13		Third period	No scoring
Jeff Glass (40 saves / 41 shots)		Goalie stats	Mike McKenna (18 saves / 21 shots)

May 28	Texas Stars	2 – 1	OT	Rockford IceHogs	H-E-B Center	Recap
No scoring		First period		No scoring
Sheldon Dries (7) – 10:06		Second period		No scoring
No scoring		Third period		18:26 – Chris DiDomenico (7)
Roope Hintz (4) – 19:51		First overtime period		No scoring
Mike McKenna (38 saves / 39 shots)		Goalie stats		Jeff Glass (38 saves / 40 shots)

Texas won series 4–2

== Calder Cup Finals ==
Note: Home team is listed first.

=== (N1) Toronto Marlies vs. (P2) Texas Stars ===
June 2	Toronto Marlies	6 – 5	Texas Stars	Ricoh Coliseum	Recap
Justin Holl (2) – 8:32		First period	6:19 – pp – Travis Morin (5); 12:46 – pp – Curtis McKenzie (7)
Frederik Gauthier (2) – 10:57; Chris Mueller (3) – 19:45		Second period	11:25 – Austin Fyten (2); 17:48 – Travis Morin (6)
Mason Marchment (4) – 2:46; Martin Marincin (1) – 4:55; Trevor Moore (5) – pp – 10:03		Third period	6:10 – Justin Dowling (3)
Garret Sparks (32 saves / 37 shots)		Goalie stats	Mike McKenna (28 saves / 34 shots)

June 3	Toronto Marlies	1 – 2	Texas Stars	Ricoh Coliseum	Recap
Ben Smith (6) – 17:51		First period	No scoring
No scoring		Second period	2:45 – Curtis McKenzie (8)
No scoring		Third period	4:31 – pp – Gavin Bayreuther (2)
Garret Sparks (22 saves / 24 shots)		Goalie stats	Mike McKenna (21 saves / 22 shots)

June 5	Texas Stars	1 – 2	Toronto Marlies	H-E-B Center	Recap
No scoring		First period	No scoring
Sheldon Dries (8) – 0:55		Second period	3:55 – Chris Mueller (4); 12:28 – Calle Rosen (2)
No scoring		Third period	No scoring
Mike McKenna (22 saves / 24 shots)		Goalie stats	Garret Sparks (19 saves / 20 shots)

June 7	Texas Stars	3 – 2	Toronto Marlies	H-E-B Center	Recap
Curtis McKenzie (9) – pp – 10:50		First period	No scoring
Curtis McKenzie (10) – 6:00		Second period	16:11 – Dmytro Timashov (6); 16:51 – Andreas Johnsson (7)
Justin Dowling (4) – 9:58		Third period	No scoring
Mike McKenna (29 saves / 31 shots)		Goalie stats	Garret Sparks (15 saves / 18 shots)

June 9	Texas Stars	2 – 6	Toronto Marlies	H-E-B Center	Recap
No scoring		First period	1:32 – Andreas Johnsson (8); 2:19 – Trevor Moore (6)
Gavin Bayreuther (3) – 4:06		Second period	7:43 – Colin Greening (4); 8:45 – Calle Rosen (3); 17:07 – Calle Rosen (4)
Sheldon Dries (9) – 11:22		Third period	11:07 – Carl Grundstrom (7)
Mike McKenna (17 saves / 22 shots); Landon Bow (7 saves / 8 shots)		Goalie stats	Garret Sparks (23 saves / 25 shots)

June 12	Toronto Marlies	2 – 5	Texas Stars	Ricoh Coliseum	Recap
No scoring		First period	No scoring
No scoring		Second period	6:46 – Curtis McKenzie (11); 14:57 – Travis Morin (7); 17:03 – Austin Fyten (3)
Calle Rosen (5) – 1:37; Justin Holl (3) – 15:12		Third period	3:08 – sh – Sheldon Dries (10); 16:24 – en – Colin Markison (3)
Garret Sparks (13 saves / 17 shots); Calvin Pickard (6 saves / 6 shots)		Goalie stats	Mike McKenna (43 saves / 45 shots)

June 14	Toronto Marlies	6 – 1	Texas Stars	Ricoh Coliseum	Recap
Andreas Johnsson (9) – 10:41; Mason Marchment (5) – 19:42		First period	No scoring
No scoring		Second period	No scoring
Carl Grundstrom (8) – 3:35; Andreas Johnsson (10) – 16:14; Ben Smith (7) – en – 18:29; Mason Marchment (6) – 19:04		Third period	11:01 – Austin Fyten (4)
Garret Sparks (29 saves / 30 shots)		Goalie stats	Mike McKenna (40 saves / 45 shots)

Toronto won series 4–3

== Playoff statistical leaders ==
=== Leading skaters ===
These are the top ten skaters based on points. If there is a tie in points, goals take precedence over assists.

GP = Games played; G = Goals; A = Assists; Pts = Points; +/– = Plus–minus; PIM = Penalty minutes

Player	Team	GP	G	A	Pts	PIM
Andreas Johnsson	Toronto Marlies	16	10	14	24	4
Curtis McKenzie	Texas Stars	22	11	9	20	27
Chris DiDomenico	Rockford IceHogs	13	7	11	18	22
Trevor Moore	Toronto Marlies	20	6	11	17	4
Justin Dowling	Texas Stars	22	4	13	17	2
Ben Smith	Toronto Marlies	20	7	9	16	0
Chris Mueller	Toronto Marlies	20	4	12	16	6
Travis Morin	Texas Stars	22	7	8	15	16
Brian Flynn	Texas Stars	22	6	9	15	6
Carl Grundstrom	Toronto Marlies	20	8	6	14	14

=== Leading goaltenders ===
This is a combined table of the top five goaltenders based on goals against average and the top five goaltenders based on save percentage with at least 240 minutes played. The table is initially sorted by goals against average, with the criterion for inclusion in bold.

GP = Games played; W = Wins; L = Losses; SA = Shots against; GA = Goals against; GAA = Goals against average; SV% = Save percentage; SO = Shutouts; TOI = Time on ice (in minutes)

Player	Team	GP	W	L	SA	GA	GAA	SV%	SO	TOI
Alex Lyon	Lehigh Valley Phantoms	11	6	5	449	25	**1.98**	**.944**	0	757:59
Alex Nedeljkovic	Charlotte Checkers	8	4	4	234	19	**2.11**	.919	1	540:44
Adin Hill	Tucson Roadrunners	9	4	5	258	20	**2.12**	**.922**	2	566:04
Garret Sparks	Toronto Marlies	19	14	5	497	42	**2.22**	.915	2	1134:20
Collin Delia	Rockford IceHogs	10	7	3	340	26	**2.34**	**.924**	0	666:42
Mike McKenna	Texas Stars	22	14	8	752	55	2.41	**.927**	2	1371:00
Thatcher Demko	Utica Comets	5	2	3	191	14	2.69	**.927**	0	312:23

Preceded by 2017 Calder Cup playoffs	Calder Cup playoffs 2018	Succeeded by 2019 Calder Cup playoffs
