= Calle Rosén =

Swedish ice hockey player (born 1994)

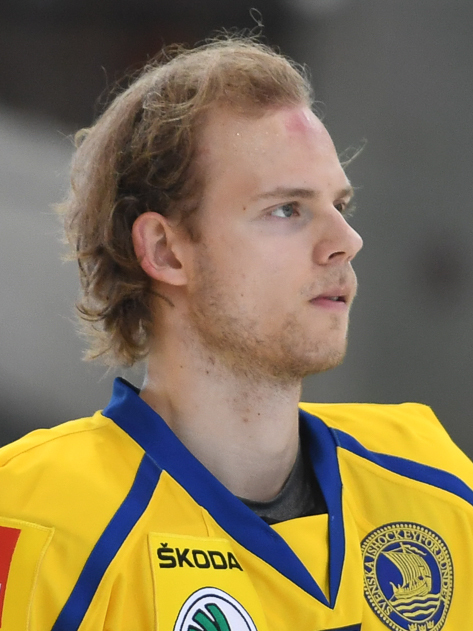
- Rosén with Sweden in 2017
- Born: 2 February 1994 (age 32) Växjö, Sweden
- Height: 6 ft 0 in (183 cm)
- Weight: 187 lb (85 kg; 13 st 5 lb)
- Position: Defence
- Shoots: Left
- NHL team (P) Cur. team Former teams: St. Louis Blues; Springfield Thunderbirds (AHL); Växjö Lakers; Toronto Maple Leafs; Colorado Avalanche
- NHL draft: Undrafted
- Playing career: 2012–present

Calle Rosén (born 2 February 1994) is a Swedish professional ice hockey defenceman currently playing for the Springfield Thunderbirds in the American Hockey League (AHL) while under contract to the St. Louis Blues of the National Hockey League (NHL).

== Playing career ==
Rosén played as a youth with Frölunda HC before making his professional debut on loan from Frölunda with Karlskrona HK then of the HockeyAllsvenskan. Unable to make a senior appearance with Frölunda, on 3 July 2014, Rosén signed with his hometown club, Växjö Lakers of the Swedish Hockey League (SHL).

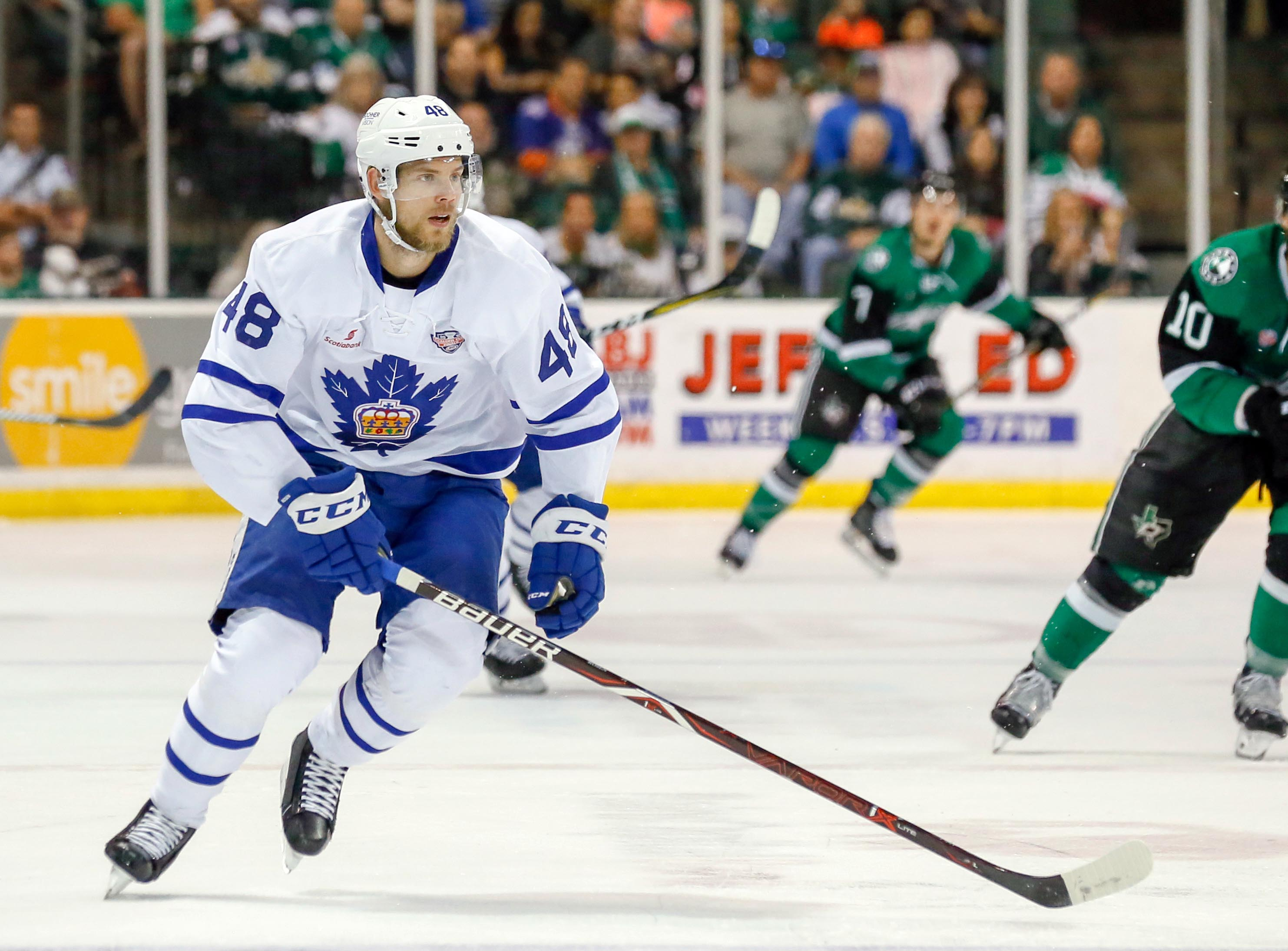
Rosén with the Toronto Marlies during the 2018 Calder Cup Final.

=== Toronto Maple Leafs ===
In late April 2017, rumours began to circulate that Rosén was being pursued by various National Hockey League teams as a free agent, headlined by two strong pushes from the Toronto Maple Leafs and Chicago Blackhawks. Soon thereafter, on 16 May, it was announced Rosén signed a two-year, entry-level contract with the Maple Leafs, alongside fellow Swedish defenceman Andreas Borgman.

In the 2017–18 season, on 6 October 2017, Rosén was re-called to the Maple Leafs from the American Hockey League (AHL)'s Toronto Marlies after Martin Marinčin was loaned to the Marlies. Rosén was reassigned to Marlies on 23 October 2017 after earning one assist in four games. However, he was recalled to the NHL on a short-lived emergency basis on 13 March 2018, along with teammate Andreas Johnsson only to be returned the next day.

During the 2018–19 season, while playing on assignment with the Toronto Marlies, Rosén signed a two-year, one-way, $1.5 million contract extension with the Maple Leafs on 10 December 2018. Rosén was called up to the Leafs on 31 March 2019, and he recorded his first NHL goal the following day in a game against the New York Islanders. In doing so, the Leafs won 2–1 and clinched a playoff spot.

=== Colorado Avalanche ===
On 1 July 2019, Rosén, along with Nazem Kadri and a third-round pick in the 2020 NHL entry draft, was traded by the Maple Leafs to the Colorado Avalanche in exchange for Tyson Barrie, Alexander Kerfoot and a sixth-round pick in 2020.

After attending the Avalanche 2019 training camp, Rosén was among the last cuts reassigned to begin the 2019–20 season with AHL affiliate, the Colorado Eagles. After 13 games with the Eagles, Rosén received his first recall to the Avalanche and made his debut, registering an assist, in a 4–1 victory over the Edmonton Oilers on 27 November 2019. In a third-pairing role, he added 2 assists through 8 games before he was returned to the AHL. With an expanded role with the Colorado Eagles, Rosén was unable to match his previous seasons offensive totals, recording 3 goals and 15 points through 35 games.

=== Return to Toronto ===
At the NHL trade deadline, he was re-acquired by the Toronto Maple Leafs in exchange for goaltender Michael Hutchinson on 24 February 2020. He was immediately assigned to report to former AHL club, the Toronto Marlies, however before appearing with the Marlies was recalled to the Maple Leafs, after an injury to fellow defenseman Jake Muzzin.

=== St. Louis Blues ===
Having concluded his contract with the Maple Leafs, on 30 July 2021, Rosén was signed as a free agent to a one-year, two-way contract with the St. Louis Blues.

During the 2021–22 season, Rosén scored his first two goals with St. Louis in a 8–3 win over the Nashville Predators on 17 April 2022, while also adding an assist.

In the 2023–24 season, Rosén spent the majority of the campaign with the AHL's Springfield Thunderbirds and notched 33 points in 68 games. His 31 assists paced all Thunderbirds defensemen and placed third among blueliners in points. Rosen added six further appearances for the Blues and chipped in one assist.

=== Return to Colorado and minor league stints ===
Following three seasons within the Blues organization, Rosén left as a free agent and was signed to a one-year, two-way contract in a return to the Colorado Avalanche organization on 1 July, 2024. In the 2024–25 season, Rosén was assigned to add a veteran presence on the blueline with AHL affiliate, the Colorado Eagles. He registered 34 points in 62 games with the Eagles, his 10 goals marked an AHL single-season career high and ranked second among Colorado defensemen. In nine Calder Cup Playoff games, Rosen tallied four points and helped the Eagles reach Game 7 of the Western Conference Final.

As a free agent at the conclusion of his contract with the Avalanche, Rosén was signed to a one-year, two-way contract with the Washington Capitals on 2 July 2025. Four months later, on 3 November, Rosén was traded by the Capitals in a return to the St. Louis Blues in exchange for Corey Schueneman.

== Career statistics ==
			Regular season					Playoffs
Season	Team	League	GP	G	A	Pts	PIM	GP	G	A	Pts	PIM
2010–11	Frölunda HC	J20	16	1	1	2	0	—	—	—	—	—
2011–12	Frölunda HC	J20	24	1	4	5	4	—	—	—	—	—
2012–13	Frölunda HC	J20	35	3	16	19	10	—	—	—	—	—
2012–13	Karlskrona HK	Allsv	12	1	2	3	0	10	2	0	2	6
2013–14	Karlskrona HK	Allsv	52	7	7	14	18	6	0	2	2	0
2014–15	Rögle BK	Allsv	42	10	13	23	8	7	2	5	7	2
2014–15	Växjö Lakers	SHL	3	0	0	0	2	—	—	—	—	—
2015–16	Växjö Lakers	SHL	52	3	11	14	4	13	1	4	5	0
2016–17	Växjö Lakers	SHL	41	6	13	19	10	6	0	0	0	2
2017–18	Toronto Maple Leafs	NHL	4	0	1	1	4	—	—	—	—	—
2017–18	Toronto Marlies	AHL	62	4	18	22	26	16	5	6	11	4
2018–19	Toronto Marlies	AHL	54	7	39	46	36	7	1	0	1	2
2018–19	Toronto Maple Leafs	NHL	4	1	0	1	0	—	—	—	—	—
2019–20	Colorado Eagles	AHL	35	3	12	15	10	—	—	—	—	—
2019–20	Colorado Avalanche	NHL	8	0	2	2	4	—	—	—	—	—
2019–20	Toronto Maple Leafs	NHL	4	0	1	1	0	—	—	—	—	—
2020–21	Toronto Marlies	AHL	30	5	8	13	22	—	—	—	—	—
2021–22	Springfield Thunderbirds	AHL	40	4	24	28	14	12	1	4	5	0
2021–22	St. Louis Blues	NHL	18	2	5	7	4	9	0	0	0	2
2022–23	St. Louis Blues	NHL	49	8	10	18	8	—	—	—	—	—
2023–24	Springfield Thunderbirds	AHL	68	2	31	33	14	—	—	—	—	—
2023–24	St. Louis Blues	NHL	6	0	1	1	2	—	—	—	—	—
2024–25	Colorado Eagles	AHL	62	10	24	34	24	9	2	2	4	6
2025–26	Hershey Bears	AHL	9	1	6	7	2	—	—	—	—	—
2025–26	Springfield Thunderbirds	AHL	61	8	23	31	24	12	3	4	7	8
SHL totals			96	9	24	33	16	19	1	4	5	2
NHL totals			93	11	20	31	22	9	0	0	0	2

== Awards and honours ==
Awards	Year
AHL
Calder Cup (Toronto Marlies)	2018
