= Pierre Engvall =

Swedish ice hockey player (born 1996)

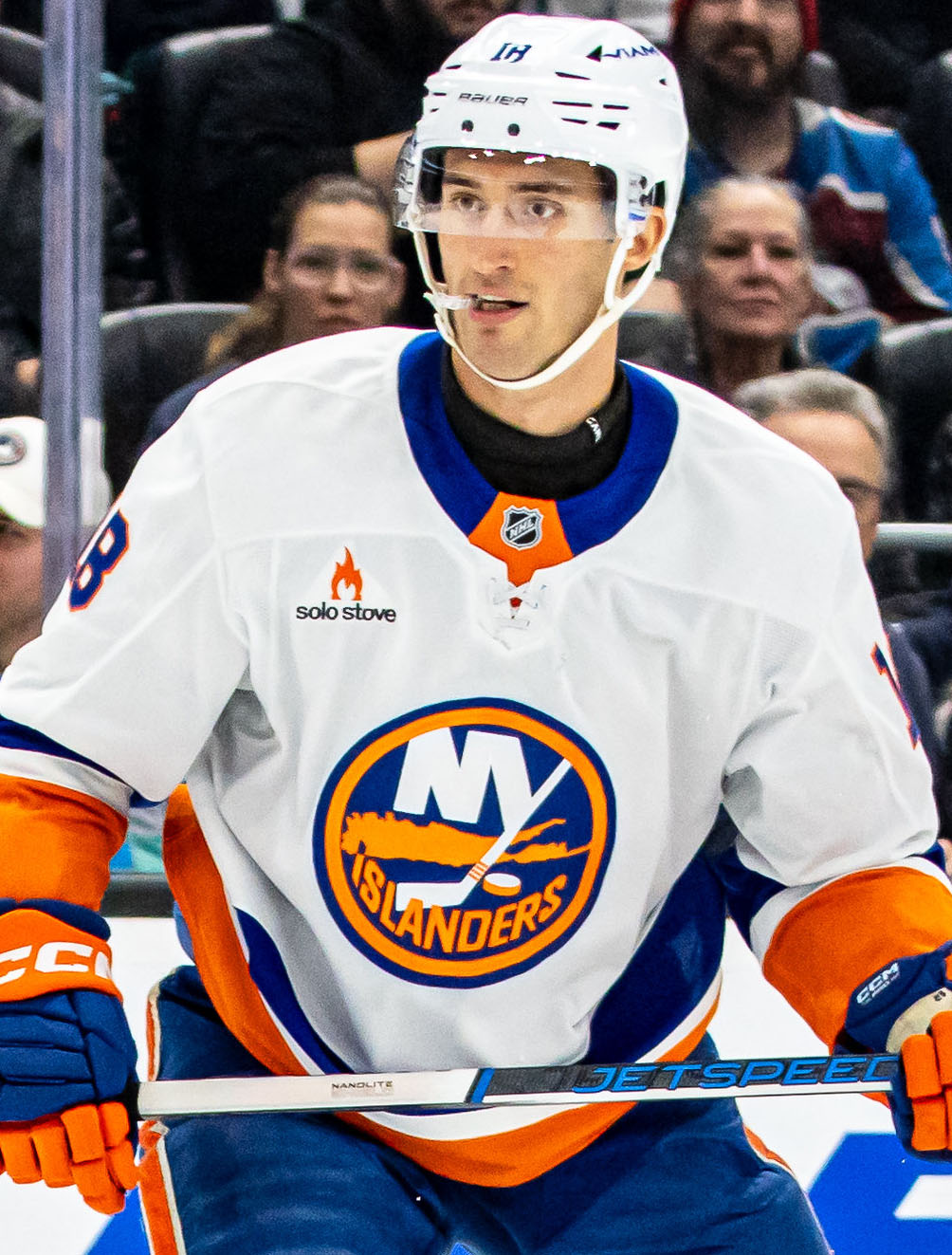
- Engvall with the New York Islanders in November 2024
- Born: 31 May 1996 (age 30) Ljungby, Sweden
- Height: 6 ft 5 in (196 cm)
- Weight: 215 lb (98 kg; 15 st 5 lb)
- Position: Forward
- Shoots: Left
- NHL team (P) Cur. team Former teams: New York Islanders; Hamilton Hammers (AHL); Frölunda HC; HV71; Toronto Maple Leafs
- NHL draft: 188th overall, 2014; Toronto Maple Leafs
- Playing career: 2014–present

Pierre Engvall (born 31 May 1996) is a Swedish professional ice hockey player who is a forward for the Hamilton Hammers in the American Hockey League (AHL) while under contract to the New York Islanders of the National Hockey League (NHL). Engvall was selected by the Toronto Maple Leafs in the seventh round (188th overall) of the 2014 NHL entry draft.

== Playing career ==
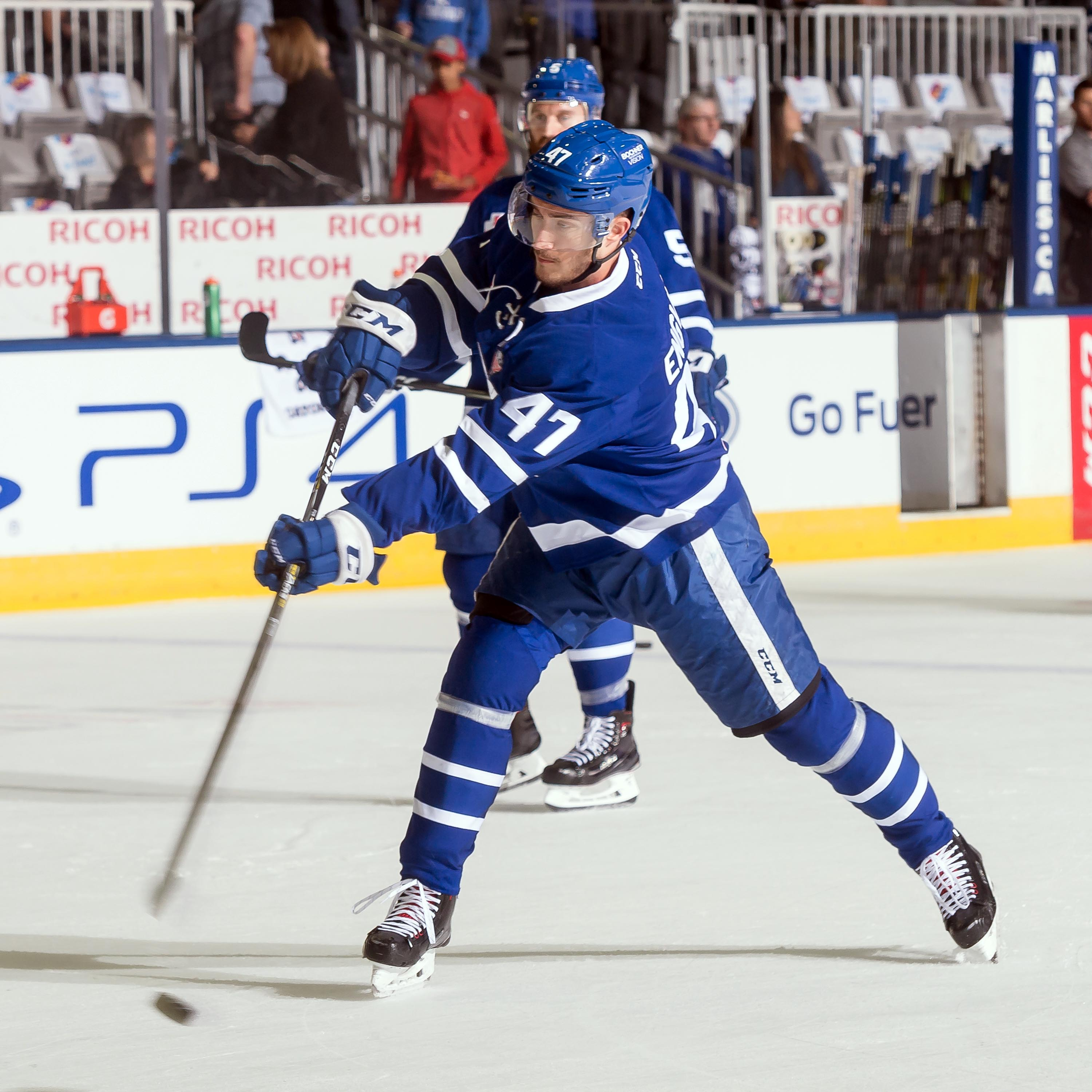
Engvall with the Toronto Marlies during the 2018 Calder Cup Final.

Engvall made his Swedish Hockey League debut during the 2014–15 season appearing in 2 regular season games. On 8 May 2015, Engvall signed a contract with Mora IK of the HockeyAllsvenskan (Allsv). After a successful breakout season with Mora in the 2015–16 season, Engvall signed a contract extension to remain with the club.

Following the completion of his second full year with Mora IK, Engvall travelled to North America and agreed to sign an amateur try-out contract for the completion of the 2016–17 season with the Maple Leafs American Hockey League (AHL) affiliate, the Toronto Marlies on 12 April 2017. He appeared in one post-season game with the Marlies before opting to return to Sweden in signing a two-year contract with the reigning champions, HV71, in a return to the SHL on 7 May 2017.

In his first full SHL season in 2017–18, Engvall despite missing games to injury produced 20 points in just 31 appearances for HV71. After an early post-season exit, Engvall for a second consecutive year agreed to a try-out to join the Toronto Marlies for the remainder of their season on 21 March 2018. While in the midst of the Marlies playoff campaign, Engvall agreed to a two-year, entry-level contract with the Toronto Maple Leafs on 18 May 2018. He played his first game with the Leafs on 19 November 2019, in a 4–2 loss against the Vegas Golden Knights. Engvall scored his first NHL goal with the Leafs on 21 November 2019, a short-handed goal in a 3–1 road win against the Arizona Coyotes. Midway through his first season in the NHL, Engvall signed a two-year, $2.5 million extension with the Maple Leafs.

On 28 February 2023, the Maple Leafs traded Engvall to the New York Islanders in exchange for a third-round pick in the 2024 NHL entry draft. On 1 July, Engvall signed a seven-year, $21 million contract extension with the Islanders.

Before the 2024–25 season, Engvall was put on waivers by the Islanders, which he cleared and was then sent to New York's American Hockey League (AHL) affiliate, the Bridgeport Islanders.

== Career statistics ==
=== Regular season and playoffs ===
			Regular season					Playoffs
Season	Team	League	GP	G	A	Pts	PIM	GP	G	A	Pts	PIM
2011–12	IF Troja/Ljungby	J18	25	9	4	13	10	—	—	—	—	—
2012–13	Frölunda HC	J18	20	11	9	20	16	—	—	—	—	—
2012–13	Frölunda HC	J18 Allsv	10	7	7	14	6	3	0	1	1	2
2012–13	Frölunda HC	J20	4	2	0	2	0	—	—	—	—	—
2013–14	Frölunda HC	J18	9	6	18	24	6	—	—	—	—	—
2013–14	Frölunda HC	J18 Allsv	7	5	7	12	2	5	1	0	1	6
2013–14	Frölunda HC	J20	39	17	18	35	42	3	0	1	1	0
2013–14	IF Troja/Ljungby	Allsv	1	0	0	0	0	—	—	—	—	—
2014–15	Frölunda HC	J20	38	17	34	51	50	8	5	1	6	10
2014–15	Frölunda HC	SHL	2	0	0	0	0	—	—	—	—	—
2014–15	IK Oskarshamn	Allsv	10	0	0	0	0	—	—	—	—	—
2015–16	Mora IK	Allsv	50	12	12	24	12	5	1	0	1	2
2016–17	Mora IK	Allsv	50	21	19	40	20	9	5	5	10	6
2016–17	Toronto Marlies	AHL	—	—	—	—	—	1	0	0	0	0
2017–18	HV71	SHL	31	7	13	20	12	2	1	0	1	0
2017–18	Toronto Marlies	AHL	9	4	4	8	2	20	3	5	8	4
2018–19	Toronto Marlies	AHL	70	19	13	32	57	13	1	6	7	2
2019–20	Toronto Marlies	AHL	15	7	9	16	6	—	—	—	—	—
2019–20	Toronto Maple Leafs	NHL	48	8	7	15	6	4	0	0	0	0
2020–21	Toronto Maple Leafs	NHL	42	7	5	12	16	6	0	1	1	12
2021–22	Toronto Maple Leafs	NHL	78	15	20	35	30	7	0	3	3	14
2022–23	Toronto Maple Leafs	NHL	58	12	9	21	25	—	—	—	—	—
2022–23	New York Islanders	NHL	18	5	4	9	6	6	1	1	2	0
2023–24	New York Islanders	NHL	74	10	18	28	18	5	1	1	2	0
2024–25	Bridgeport Islanders	AHL	6	1	0	1	2	—	—	—	—	—
2024–25	New York Islanders	NHL	62	8	7	15	16	—	—	—	—	—
SHL totals			33	7	13	20	12	2	1	0	1	0
NHL totals			380	65	70	135	117	28	2	6	8	26

=== International ===
Year	Team	Event	Result	GP	G	A	Pts	PIM
2013	Sweden	U17	1st place, gold medalist(s)	6	2	1	3	2
Junior totals				6	2	1	3	2

== Awards and honours ==
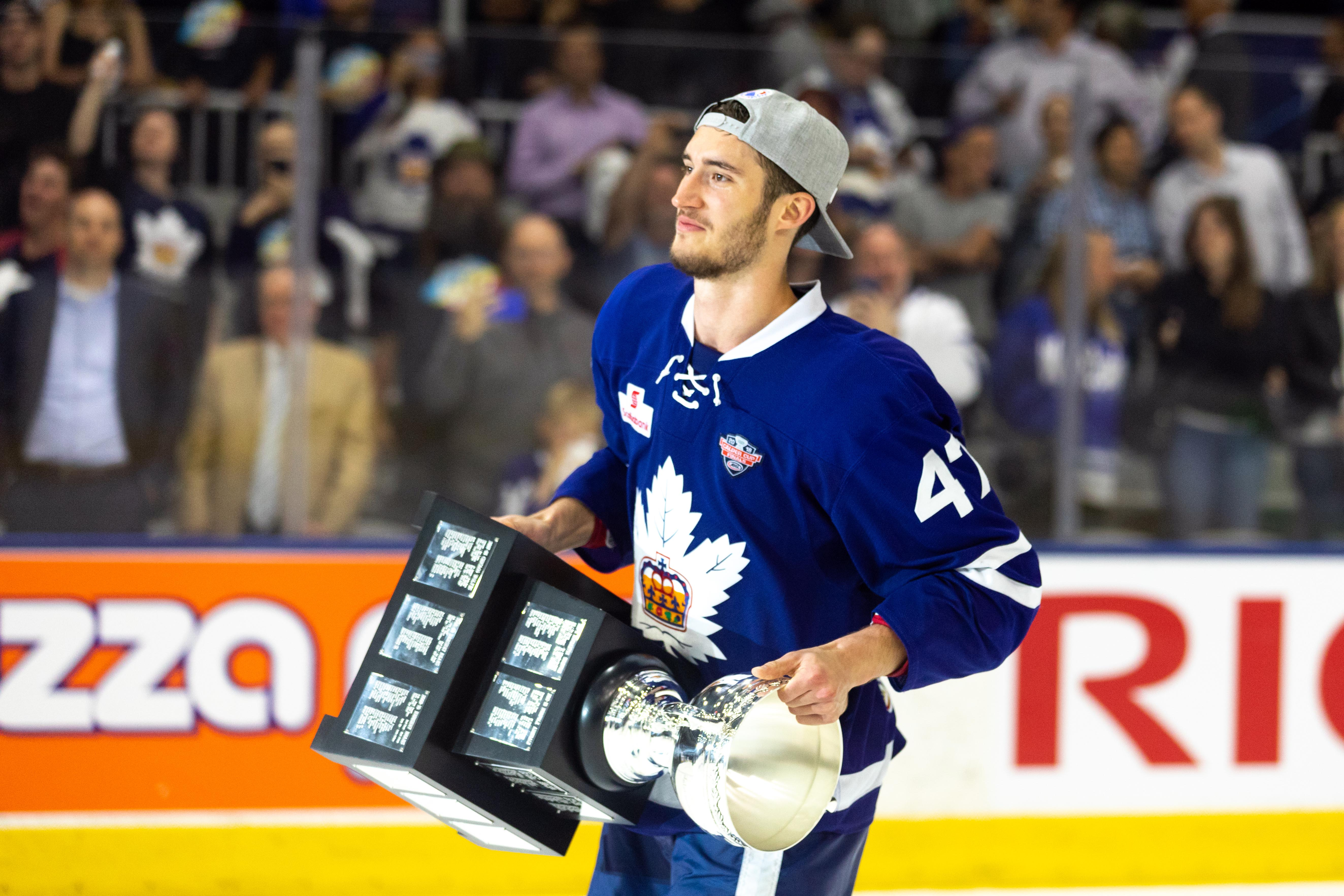
Engvall with the 2018 Calder Cup.

Awards	Year	Ref
AHL
Calder Cup champion	2018	
