= Carl Grundström =

Swedish ice hockey player (born 1997)

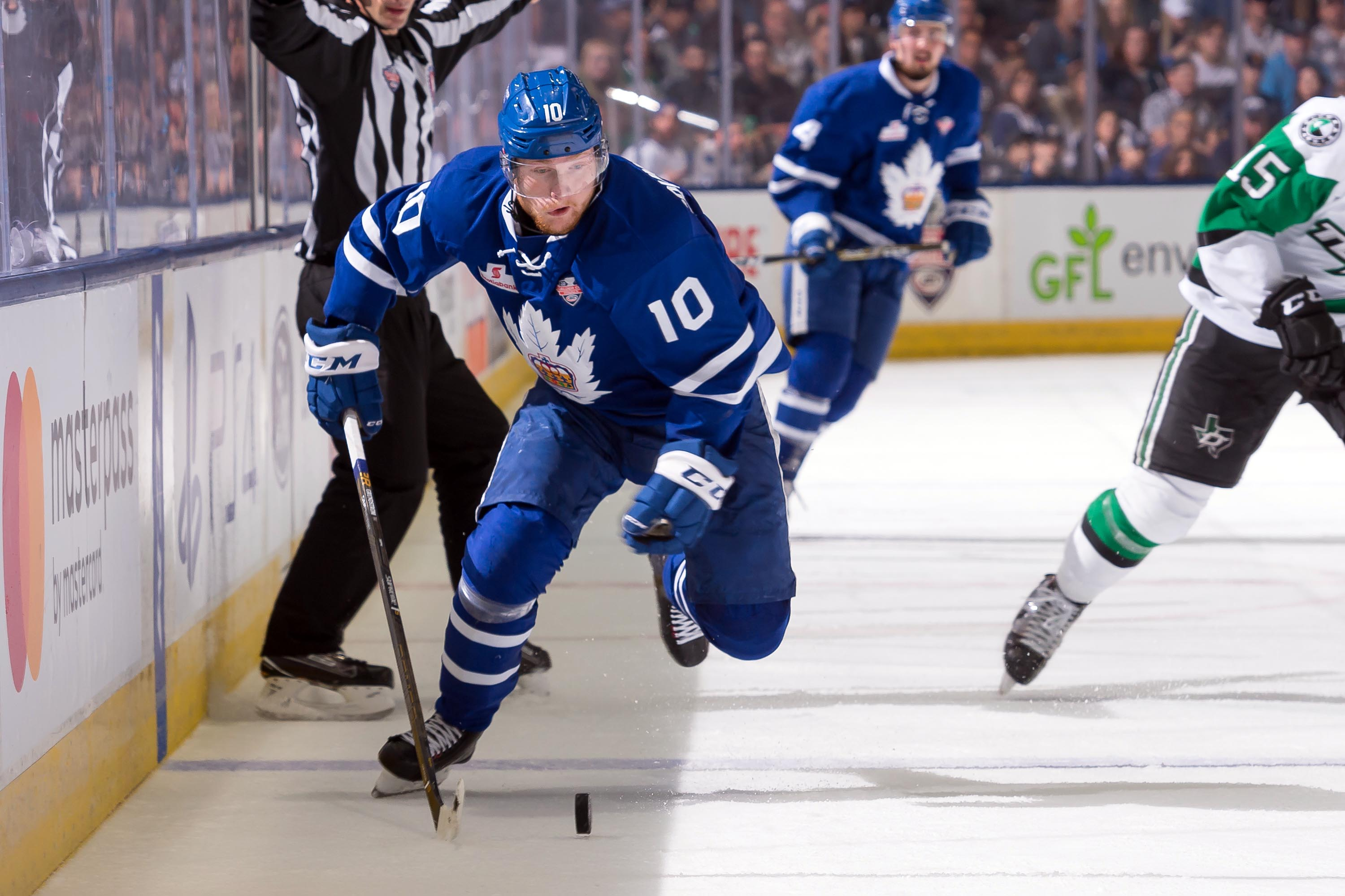
- Grundström with the Toronto Marlies in 2018
- Born: 1 December 1997 (age 28) Umeå, Sweden
- Height: 6 ft 0 in (183 cm)
- Weight: 200 lb (91 kg; 14 st 4 lb)
- Position: Forward
- Shoots: Left
- NHL team (P) Cur. team Former teams: Philadelphia Flyers; Lehigh Valley Phantoms (AHL); Modo Hockey; Frölunda HC; Los Angeles Kings; San Jose Sharks
- National team: Sweden
- NHL draft: 57th overall, 2016; Toronto Maple Leafs
- Playing career: 2014–present

Carl Grundström (born 1 December 1997) is a Swedish professional ice hockey player who is a forward for the Lehigh Valley Phantoms of the American Hockey League (AHL) while under contract to the Philadelphia Flyers of the National Hockey League (NHL). Grundström was selected in the second round, 57th overall, by the Toronto Maple Leafs in the 2016 NHL entry draft, and has also played in the NHL for the Los Angeles Kings and San Jose Sharks.

== Playing career ==
Grundström made his Swedish Hockey League debut playing with Modo Hockey during the 2014–15 season. Following Modo's relegation to the HockeyAllsvenskan at the conclusion of the 2015–16 season, Grundström remained in the SHL, signing a two-year contract with Frölunda HC on 16 April 2016. During the 2016 NHL entry draft, he was selected in the second round (57th overall) by the Toronto Maple Leafs.

In the 2016–17 season, Grundström recorded a career best 14 goals and 20 points in 45 games with Frölunda. On 28 April 2017, Grundström left Frölunda mid-contract, using his NHL exit clause in agreeing to a three-year, entry-level contract with the Maple Leafs.

After attending the Maple Leafs training camp for the 2017–18 season, Grundström was reassigned to continue his development on loan in Sweden with Frölunda HC on 2 October 2017. He placed second on the club with 17 goals and finished with 24 points in 35 games. For the second consecutive season he was reassigned to join the Maple Leafs' American Hockey League (AHL) affiliate, Toronto Marlies, in the post-season. He helped the Marlies to claim their first Calder Cup, posting 8 goals and 14 points in 20 playoff games, leading all AHL rookies in playoff scoring.

Grundström returned to the Marlies for the 2018–19 season. He recorded 29 points in 42 games for the club. On 28 January 2019, Grundström (alongside Sean Durzi and a 2019 first-round pick) was traded to the Los Angeles Kings in exchange for Jake Muzzin. He was initially assigned to their American League affiliate, the Ontario Reign, but was recalled by the Kings on 9 March. He made his debut that night, and scored his first career NHL goal in a 4–2 loss to the Arizona Coyotes.

On 1 September 2020, the Kings signed Grundström to a two-year contract extension. With the COVID-19 pandemic delaying the North American season, Grundström remained in Sweden and was loaned to Swedish second tier Allsvenskan club, IF Björklöven, on 5 September 2020, until the commencement of the Kings training camp.

After six seasons in the Kings organization, Grundström was traded to the San Jose Sharks on 27 June 2024, in exchange for Kyle Burroughs. A week later, he signed a two-year contract with the Sharks. In October 2025, he was traded to the Philadelphia Flyers alongside Artem Guryev in exchange for Ryan Ellis and a conditional sixth-round pick in 2026.

On July 1, 2026, the Flyers re-signed Grundström to a one-year contract worth $1 million.

== International play ==
Medal record

Representing Sweden

Ice hockey

World Championships
Bronze medal – third place	2024 Czech Republic	

Grundström represented Sweden at the 2024 IIHF World Championship and won a bronze medal.

== Career statistics ==
=== Regular season and playoffs ===
			Regular season					Playoffs
Season	Team	League	GP	G	A	Pts	PIM	GP	G	A	Pts	PIM
2011–12	IF Björklöven	J18 Allsv	5	0	1	1	2	—	—	—	—	—
2012–13	IF Björklöven	J18	19	10	8	18	24	—	—	—	—	—
2012–13	IF Björklöven	J18 Allsv	14	3	2	5	18	—	—	—	—	—
2013–14	Modo Hockey	J18	8	7	8	15	10	—	—	—	—	—
2013–14	Modo Hockey	J18 Allsv	10	12	4	16	37	5	2	2	4	29
2013–14	Modo Hockey	J20	31	6	4	10	6	1	0	0	0	0
2014–15	Modo Hockey	J18	1	1	0	1	0	—	—	—	—	—
2014–15	Modo Hockey	J18 Allsv	3	2	3	5	2	3	2	2	4	0
2014–15	Modo Hockey	J20	27	21	15	36	53	4	4	2	6	2
2014–15	Modo Hockey	SHL	24	2	3	5	8	—	—	—	—	—
2015–16	Modo Hockey	J20	1	0	0	0	0	—	—	—	—	—
2015–16	Modo Hockey	SHL	49	7	9	16	53	—	—	—	—	—
2016–17	Frölunda HC	SHL	45	14	6	20	6	14	1	1	2	4
2016–17	Toronto Marlies	AHL	—	—	—	—	—	6	3	1	4	2
2017–18	Frölunda HC	SHL	35	17	7	24	8	6	2	0	2	2
2017–18	Toronto Marlies	AHL	2	1	2	3	0	20	8	6	14	14
2018–19	Toronto Marlies	AHL	42	13	16	29	26	—	—	—	—	—
2018–19	Ontario Reign	AHL	13	3	7	10	6	—	—	—	—	—
2018–19	Los Angeles Kings	NHL	15	5	1	6	6	—	—	—	—	—
2019–20	Ontario Reign	AHL	40	12	16	28	36	—	—	—	—	—
2019–20	Los Angeles Kings	NHL	13	0	4	4	8	—	—	—	—	—
2020–21	IF Björklöven	Allsv	18	5	8	13	26	—	—	—	—	—
2020–21	Los Angeles Kings	NHL	47	6	5	11	16	—	—	—	—	—
2021–22	Los Angeles Kings	NHL	54	9	6	15	26	6	3	1	4	0
2022–23	Los Angeles Kings	NHL	57	12	7	19	16	6	0	1	1	4
2023–24	Los Angeles Kings	NHL	50	8	4	12	12	5	0	0	0	0
2023–24	Ontario Reign	AHL	2	1	1	2	0	—	—	—	—	—
2024–25	San Jose Sharks	NHL	56	3	6	9	24	—	—	—	—	—
2025–26	Lehigh Valley Phantoms	AHL	19	6	9	15	6	—	—	—	—	—
2025–26	Philadelphia Flyers	NHL	47	9	4	13	19	3	0	1	1	2
SHL totals			153	40	25	65	75	20	3	1	4	6
NHL totals			339	52	37	89	127	20	3	3	6	6

=== International ===
Year	Team	Event	Result	GP	G	A	Pts	PIM
2014	Sweden	U17	6th	5	0	1	1	4
2014	Sweden	IH18	4th	5	0	2	2	2
2015	Sweden	U18	8th	5	3	2	5	10
2016	Sweden	WJC	4th	7	1	0	1	6
2017	Sweden	WJC	4th	7	3	4	7	12
2022	Sweden	WC	6th	5	1	1	2	2
2023	Sweden	WC	6th	8	1	1	2	4
2024	Sweden	WC	3rd place, bronze medalist(s)	10	3	0	3	0
2026	Sweden	WC	7th	7	1	3	4	2
Junior totals				29	7	9	16	34
Senior totals				30	6	5	11	8

== Awards and honors ==
Awards	Year	Ref
AHL
Calder Cup champion	2018	
