= Justin Holl =

American ice hockey player (born 1992)

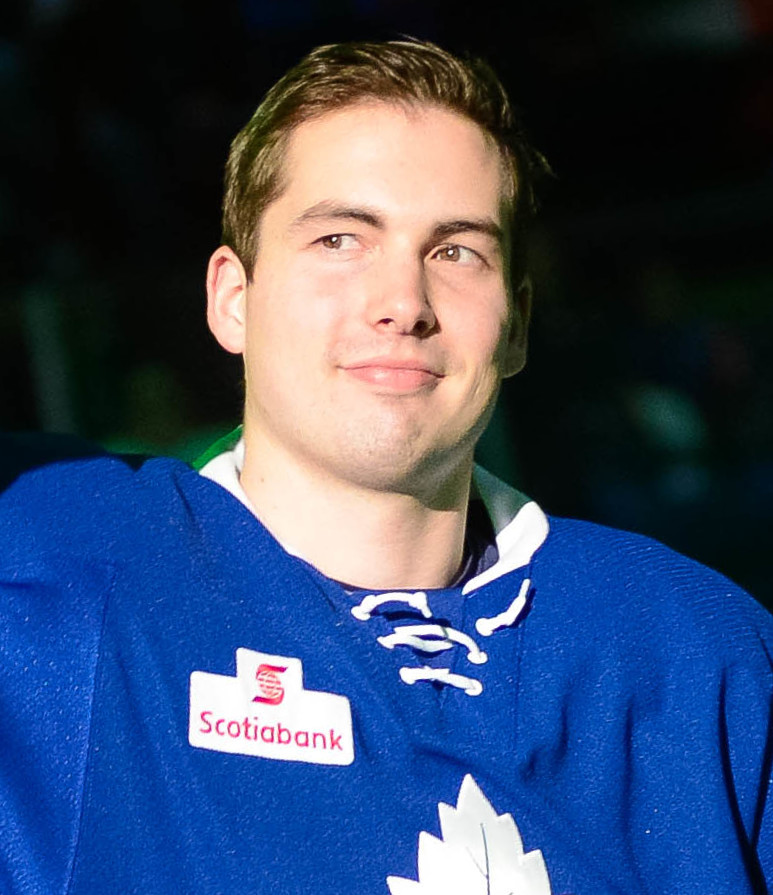
- Holl with the Toronto Marlies in 2018
- Born: January 30, 1992 (age 34) Tonka Bay, Minnesota, U.S.
- Height: 6 ft 3 in (191 cm)
- Weight: 205 lb (93 kg; 14 st 9 lb)
- Position: Defense
- Shoots: Right
- NHL team Former teams: Washington Capitals; Toronto Maple Leafs; Detroit Red Wings; St. Louis Blues
- NHL draft: 54th overall, 2010; Chicago Blackhawks
- Playing career: 2014–present

Justin Gunnar Holl (born January 30, 1992) is an American professional ice hockey player who is a defenseman for the Washington Capitals of the National Hockey League (NHL). He was originally drafted in the second round, 54th overall, by the Chicago Blackhawks in the 2010 NHL entry draft.

In 2018, Holl became the first defenseman in Maple Leaf history to record two goals in his first two NHL games. In the same year, he helped the American Hockey League (AHL)'s Toronto Marlies win their first Calder Cup.

== Playing career ==
=== Early career ===
Holl attended Minnetonka High School from 2007 to 2010. In his senior year at Minnetonka High School, Holl was named co-captain alongside Jake Gardiner and made the honor roll. On November 20, 2009, he signed a commitment agreement with the Minnesota Golden Gophers at the University of Minnesota. At the conclusion of the season, Holl was named a finalist for Minnesota Mr. Hockey, an award given to the best senior high school hockey player in Minnesota.

=== Collegiate ===
Holl was selected by the Chicago Blackhawks in the second round, 54th overall, in the 2010 NHL entry draft; however, he kept his commitment to play for the University of Minnesota. While studying at the University of Minnesota, Holl majored in Finance at the Carlson School of Management. In his first season with the Gophers, he played in 25 games and recorded seven points, including one goal. After his freshman season, he was invited to Team USA's National Junior Evaluation Camp in August.

In his sophomore season, Holl's role on the Gophers deviated from defence to offence occasionally throughout the year. After recording three goals and seven points, he was presented with the Gophers Dr. V. George Nagobads Unsung Hero. The next year, Holl helped the Gophers qualify for the 2014 NCAA Frozen Four where he recorded his first collegiate goal that season with 0.6 seconds left in the game to beat North Dakota 2–1. After his senior season, Holl split his time during the 2014–15 season between Chicago's minor league affiliates: the Indy Fuel of the ECHL and the Rockford IceHogs of the American Hockey League (AHL).

=== Toronto Maple Leafs ===
Since he never signed an entry-level contract with the Blackhawks, Holl was a free agent and signed an AHL contract with the Toronto Marlies in 2015. One year later, on July 2, 2016, he signed an NHL entry-level contract with the Toronto Maple Leafs. He was assigned to the Marlies for the 2016–17 season. During the 2016–17 season, he was named an alternate captain for the Marlies.

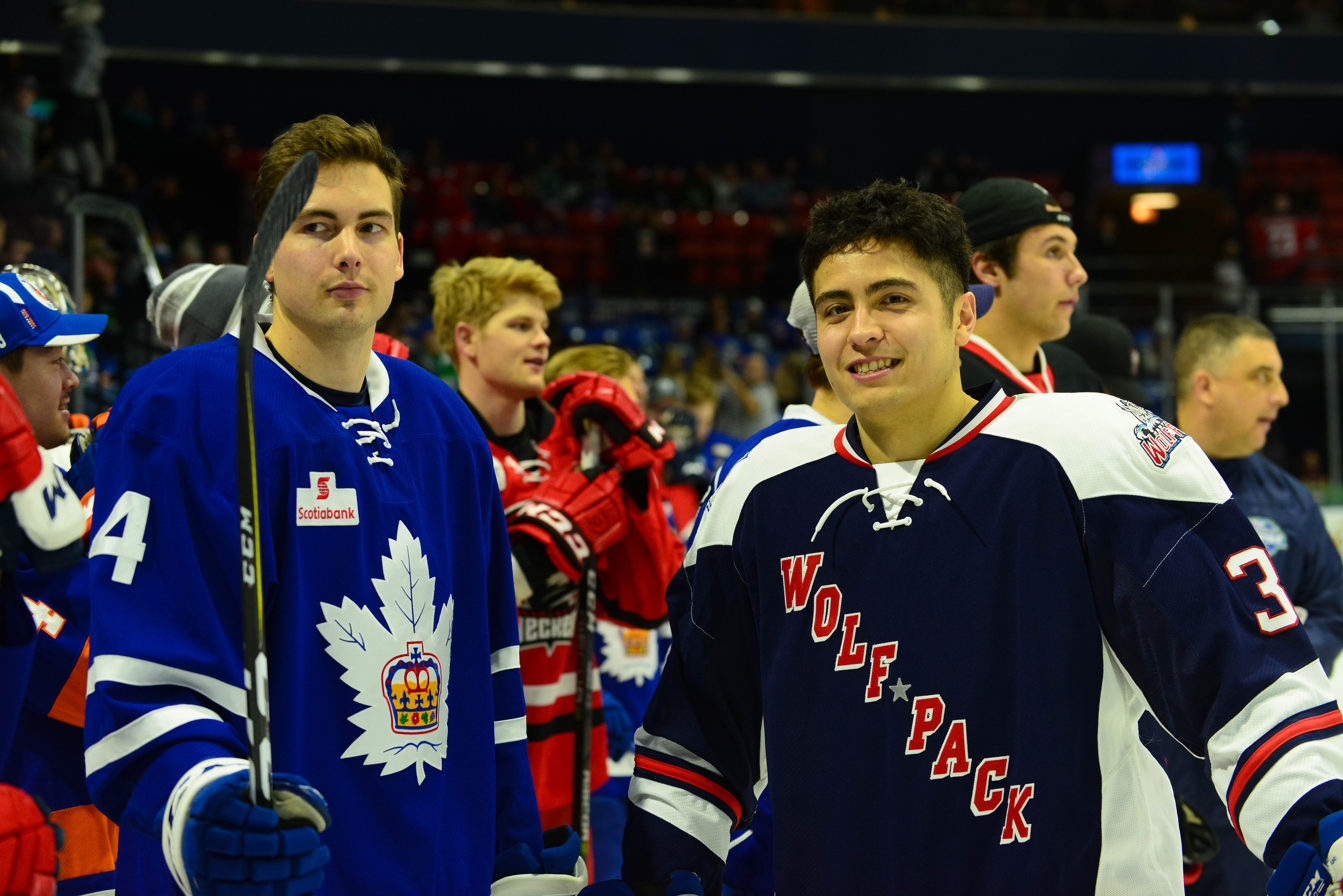
Holl (left foreground) stands with other skaters at the 2018 AHL All-Star Game.

During the 2017–18 season, Holl was selected for the 2018 AHL All-Star Game. He was called up to the NHL on an emergency basis on January 31, 2018, to replace an ill Ron Hainsey. He made his NHL debut that night in a game against the New York Islanders. During this game, he scored his first NHL goal to help the Leafs win 5–0. It marked the first time since 1978 that a Maple Leafs defenseman scored in his NHL debut. On February 1, in a game against the New York Rangers, Holl scored his second NHL goal to become the first Maple Leafs defenseman to score two goals in his first two games. As well, he became only the sixth defenseman in NHL history to score in each of his first two games.

He was reassigned to the Marlies on February 3 after defenseman Morgan Rielly was activated off injured reserve. Holl continued to succeed in the AHL, setting a new career-high in points and assists during the regular season. During the 2018 Calder Cup playoffs, he recorded 5 points in 20 games to help the Marlies win their first Calder Cup in franchise history.

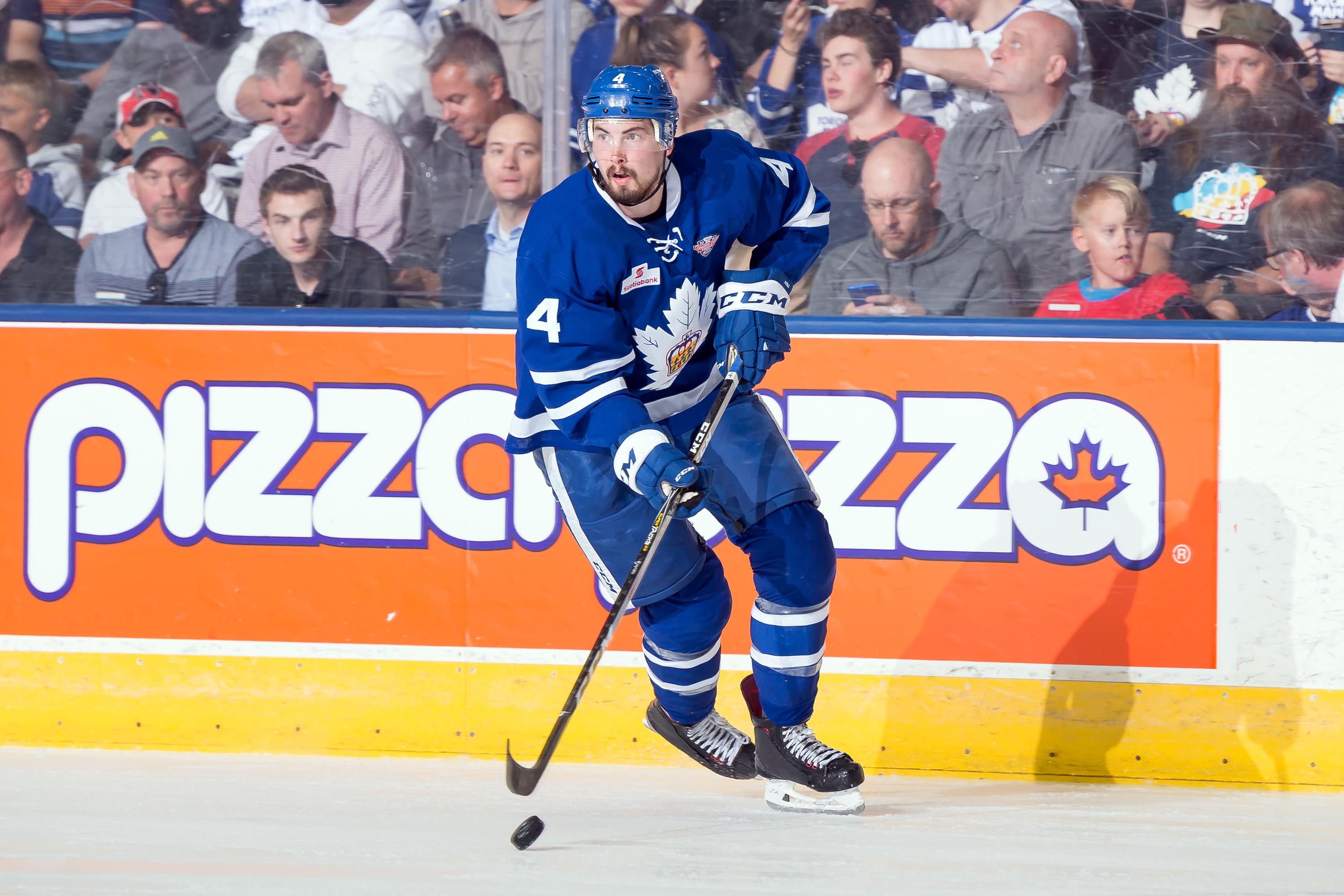
Holl with the Toronto Marlies during the 2018 Calder Cup Final.

On July 3, 2018, Holl signed a two-year, $1.35 million contract extension with the Maple Leafs. He attended the Leafs' training camp prior to the 2018–19 season and was named to the opening night roster. He was a healthy scratch for the Leafs' first 12 games of the season, playing in his first game on November 1, against the Dallas Stars. As a result of injuries and illnesses, Holl replaced Igor Ozhiganov in the Leafs lineup and recorded his first career assist in a 7–6 win over the Philadelphia Flyers on March 15, 2019.

The following season, Holl entered a bigger role with the Leafs after the firing of Mike Babcock. He consistently played on one of the Leafs top pairings alongside Jake Muzzin and later Travis Dermott due to injuries. In this increased role, he earned his first multi point game on December 11, against the Vancouver Canucks. He eventually signed a three-year contract extension with the Maple Leafs on December 31, before their game against his hometown team, the Minnesota Wild.

=== Detroit Red Wings ===
On July 1, 2023, Holl left the Maple Leafs as a free agent and was signed to a three-year, $10.4 million contract with the Detroit Red Wings.

=== St. Louis Blues ===
On March 6, 2026, Holl was acquired by the St. Louis Blues in a trade-deadline deal with the Red Wings, alongside Dmitri Buchelnikov, a 2026 first-round pick, and a 2026 third-round pick, in exchange for Justin Faulk.

=== Washington Capitals ===
After a brief tenure with the Blues organization, Holl left as a free agent and was signed to a one-year, $900,000 contract with the Washington Capitals for the 2026–27 on July 1, 2026.

== Personal life ==
Holl proposed to his longtime partner, Audrey Erickson, in August 2019. They married in August 2019. They had a son in January 2025.

His father Jerry is an author, notably of a book detailing his bike ride from Alaska to Mexico.

Holl's cousin, Mike Erickson, also played hockey for the University of Minnesota and was drafted 72nd overall by the Minnesota Wild in the 2002 NHL entry draft.

== Career statistics ==
			Regular season					Playoffs
Season	Team	League	GP	G	A	Pts	PIM	GP	G	A	Pts	PIM
2007–08	Minnetonka High	USHS	24	0	1	1	0	—	—	—	—	—
2008–09	Minnetonka High	USHS	28	1	6	7	4	—	—	—	—	—
2009–10	Minnetonka High	USHS	25	17	14	31	8	6	3	3	6	0
2009–10	Omaha Lancers	USHL	11	0	4	4	6	8	1	1	2	4
2010–11	University of Minnesota	WCHA	25	1	6	7	12	—	—	—	—	—
2011–12	University of Minnesota	WCHA	43	3	8	11	34	—	—	—	—	—
2012–13	University of Minnesota	WCHA	35	3	4	7	10	—	—	—	—	—
2013–14	University of Minnesota	B1G	39	1	12	13	20	—	—	—	—	—
2014–15	Indy Fuel	ECHL	66	7	27	34	39	—	—	—	—	—
2014–15	Rockford IceHogs	AHL	2	0	0	0	0	—	—	—	—	—
2015–16	Toronto Marlies	AHL	60	5	16	21	15	15	0	4	4	2
2016–17	Toronto Marlies	AHL	72	8	11	19	30	11	1	6	7	2
2017–18	Toronto Marlies	AHL	60	7	21	28	34	20	3	2	5	16
2017–18	Toronto Maple Leafs	NHL	2	2	0	2	0	—	—	—	—	—
2018–19	Toronto Maple Leafs	NHL	11	0	1	1	2	—	—	—	—	—
2019–20	Toronto Maple Leafs	NHL	68	2	16	18	43	5	0	0	0	2
2020–21	Toronto Maple Leafs	NHL	55	2	18	20	25	7	0	1	1	4
2021–22	Toronto Maple Leafs	NHL	69	3	20	23	41	5	0	1	1	6
2022–23	Toronto Maple Leafs	NHL	80	2	16	18	39	8	0	1	1	11
2023–24	Detroit Red Wings	NHL	38	0	5	5	22	—	—	—	—	—
2024–25	Detroit Red Wings	NHL	73	2	6	8	16	—	—	—	—	—
2025–26	Grand Rapids Griffins	AHL	41	2	12	14	10	—	—	—	—	—
2025–26	St. Louis Blues	NHL	9	1	1	2	6	—	—	—	—	—
NHL totals			405	14	83	97	194	25	0	3	3	23

== Awards and honors ==
Award	Year	Ref
College
All-WCHA Academic	2012, 2013	
AHL
All-Star Game	2018	
Calder Cup champion	2018	
