= Colin Markison =

American ice hockey player

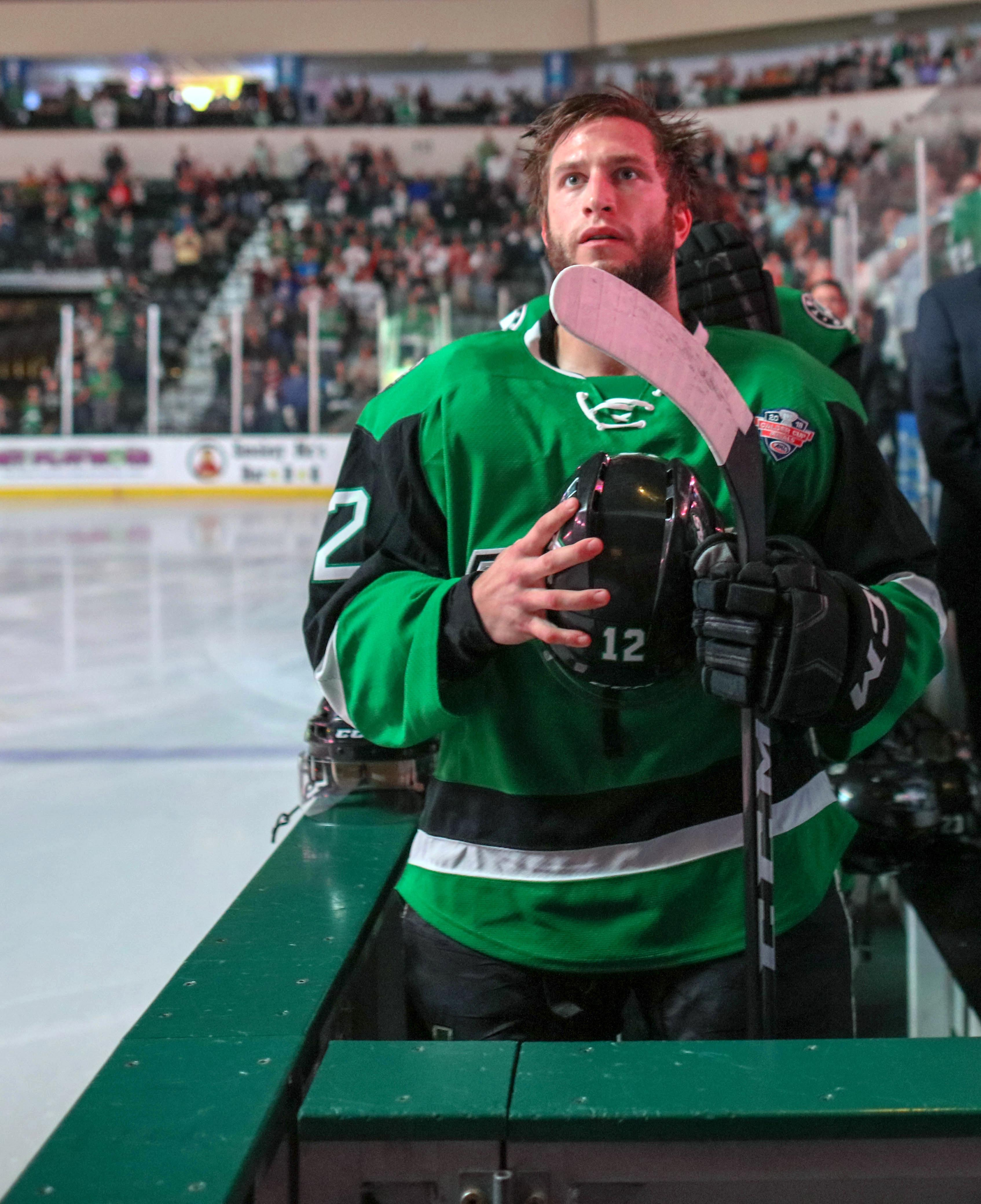
- Markison with the Texas Stars in 2018
- Born: August 6, 1992 (age 34) Princeton, New Jersey, U.S.
- Height: 5 ft 10 in (178 cm)
- Weight: 185 lb (84 kg; 13 st 3 lb)
- Position: Right wing
- Shot: Right
- AHL team (P) Cur. team Former teams: Chicago Wolves; Texas Stars (AHL); Bridgeport Sound Tigers; Charlotte Checkers
- NHL draft: Undrafted
- Playing career: 2015–2022

Colin Francis Markison (born August 6, 1992) is an American former professional ice hockey player. He previously played for the Bridgeport Islanders, Texas Stars, and Charlotte Checkers of the American Hockey League (AHL).

== Early life ==
Markison was born on August 6, 1992, to parents Brian and Joan Markison in Princeton, New Jersey. His siblings Adrienne, Benjamin, and Devin are also athletes in tennis and lacrosse respectively. His oldest sister Adrienne captained the Quinnipiac University women's tennis team in 2011, while Benjamin played lacrosse at Susquehanna University and Devin at the University of North Carolina. Growing up, Markison played lacrosse with the True North Lacrosse Team under coach Chris Sanderson.

== Playing career ==
Markison attended The Pennington School for his freshman and sophomore years before moving to Omaha, Nebraska for junior hockey. While at Pennington, Markison competed with the Jersey Hitmen in the Eastern Junior Hockey League and represented Team USA in the 2008 Under-17 Five Nations Tournament. He was named to the 2008 All-State Ice Hockey Second Team and selected by the Omaha Lancers of the United States Hockey League (USHL) during the 2008 USHL Futures Draft. His Ontario Hockey League (OHL) playing rights were taken by the Kitchener Rangers in the 2008 Priority Selection. Markison and the Jersey Hitmen qualified for the 2009 USA Hockey Tier III Junior A National Championship but fell to the New Hampshire Jr. Monarchs 3–2. Despite the loss, Markison was named Playoff Finals MVP.

He played two seasons in the United States Hockey League from 2009 until 2011, during which he recorded 17 points in both seasons. In his first season with the Lancers, Markison committed to play NCAA Division 1 ice hockey with the Vermont Catamounts.

=== Collegiate ===
Markison began his collegiate career with the Catamounts in the 2011–12 season. He recorded his first collegiate point, an assist, in a 5–1 loss to the Providence Friars on November 5, 2011. His first two collegiate goals came during the Catamount Cup, an annual men's college ice hockey tournament, earning him Hockey East Rookie of the Week honors. Markison concluded his rookie campaign with 14 points in 33 games and earned a Hockey East All-Academic Team honor for maintaining a 3.23 GPA.

Markison returned to the Catamounts for the 2012–13 season and scored the game-tying goal in the Catamounts season opener against the UMass Lowell River Hawks on October 12, 2012. This would turn out to be his last game until January 11, 2013, due to injury. In his return, Markison recorded an assist on Anthony DeCenzo's goal in an eventual 4–2 loss to the River Hawks. As a result of missing most of the season, he concluded his sophomore campaign with two points in 12 games.

Markison rebounded in his junior season by recording 11 points in 36 games and ranking fourth on the team in goals scored. He was again selected for the Hockey East All-Academic Team at the conclusion of the 2013–14 season. As an undrafted free agent, Markison was invited to attend Edmonton Oilers Development Camp over the summer. Upon returning to the Catamounts for his final season of Division 1 ice hockey, Markison recorded a career-high 25 points in 40 games to co-receive the team's Player Of The Year award with Mike Paliotta. He concluded his collegiate career by signing an amateur tryout agreement with the Bridgeport Sound Tigers of the American Hockey League (AHL).

=== Professional ===
Markison joined the Sound Tigers to help them conclude their 2014–15 campaign. He recorded his first career professional goal in a 4–2 win over the Syracuse Crunch on April 18, 2015. After attending the Sound Tigers training camp, Markison was reassigned to the Sound Tigers ECHL affiliate, the Missouri Mavericks on October 7, 2015, to begin their 2015–16 season. On November 13, 2015, Markison recorded his first professional hat-trick in a 7–2 win over the Wichita Thunder.

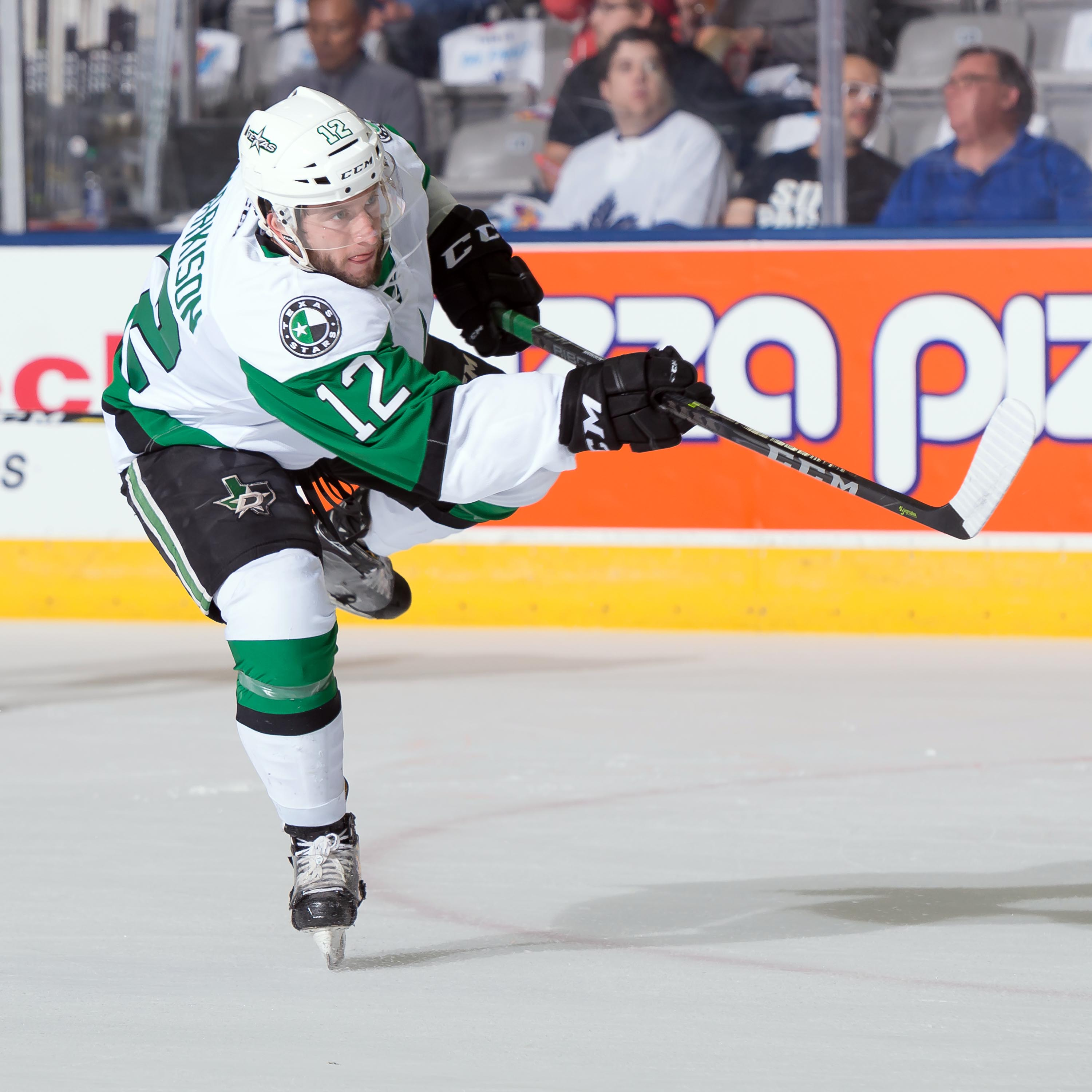
Markison with the Texas Stars during the 2018 Calder Cup playoffs

On September 13, 2016, Markison signed a one-year contract extension with the Sound Tigers prior to the 2016–17 season. After attending the New York Islanders training camp, Markison was reassigned to Bridgeport for the 2016–17 season. However, his second year with the Sound Tigers was cut short periodically throughout the season due to various injuries. Following the opening night game, Markison suffered a lower body injury which forced him to miss a month of playing time, and he was re-injured three games after his return. At the conclusion of the season, Markison chose to leave the Sound Tigers organization and sign a one-year contract with the Texas Stars.

After attending the Stars' training camp prior to the 2017–18 season, his first season with the Stars organization proved to be the most successful of his AHL career at the time. In his Stars debut on October 6, 2017, Markison recorded one goal to help lead the team over the Chicago Wolves 6–5. Markison helped the Stars advance to the 2018 Calder Cup Finals by assisting on the game-winning goal against the Rockford IceHogs in the Western Conference Finals. He recorded a career-high 27 points in the regular season and five in the postseason as the Stars fell one win short of the Calder Cup against the Toronto Marlies.

On June 28, 2018, the Stars re-signed Markison to a one-year contract prior to the 2018–19 season. He tied his career high 27 points and set a new career high in goals with eight. On July 18, 2019, Markison chose to leave the Stars organization and sign a one-year contract with the Charlotte Checkers, affiliate to the Carolina Hurricanes. He recorded his first goal with the team on November 8, 2019, in a win over the Springfield Thunderbirds.

As a free agent Markison opted to remain within the Hurricanes organization, signing a one-year contract with new AHL affiliate, the Chicago Wolves, on October 28, 2020. Prior to the pandemic delayed 2020–21 season, with the Wolves having a surplus of players due to two NHL affiliation agreements, Markison was loaned by Chicago to return to former club, the Texas Stars, on February 1, 2021.

== Personal life ==
Markison met his future wife Shannon while attending The Pennington School and the two later married in 2019.

== Career statistics ==
			Regular season					Playoffs
Season	Team	League	GP	G	A	Pts	PIM	GP	G	A	Pts	PIM
2011–12	Univ. of Vermont	HE	33	6	8	14	10	—	—	—	—	—
2012–13	Univ. of Vermont	HE	18	1	1	2	4	—	—	—	—	—
2013–14	Univ. of Vermont	HE	36	7	4	11	8	—	—	—	—	—
2014–15	Univ. of Vermont	HE	40	9	16	25	24	—	—	—	—	—
2014–15	Bridgeport Sound Tigers	AHL	6	1	0	1	0	—	—	—	—	—
2015–16	Bridgeport Sound Tigers	AHL	39	3	8	11	10	—	—	—	—	—
2015–16	Missouri Mavericks	ECHL	24	10	7	17	2	—	—	—	—	—
2016–17	Bridgeport Sound Tigers	AHL	28	2	4	6	8	—	—	—	—	—
2017–18	Texas Stars	AHL	72	7	20	27	29	22	3	2	5	4
2018–19	Texas Stars	AHL	62	8	19	27	29	—	—	—	—	—
2019–20	Charlotte Checkers	AHL	40	3	6	9	26	—	—	—	—	—
2020–21	Texas Stars	AHL	19	0	2	2	4	—	—	—	—	—
AHL totals			267	24	59	83	91	25	3	2	5	4
