= Tyler Sikura =

Canadian ice hockey player

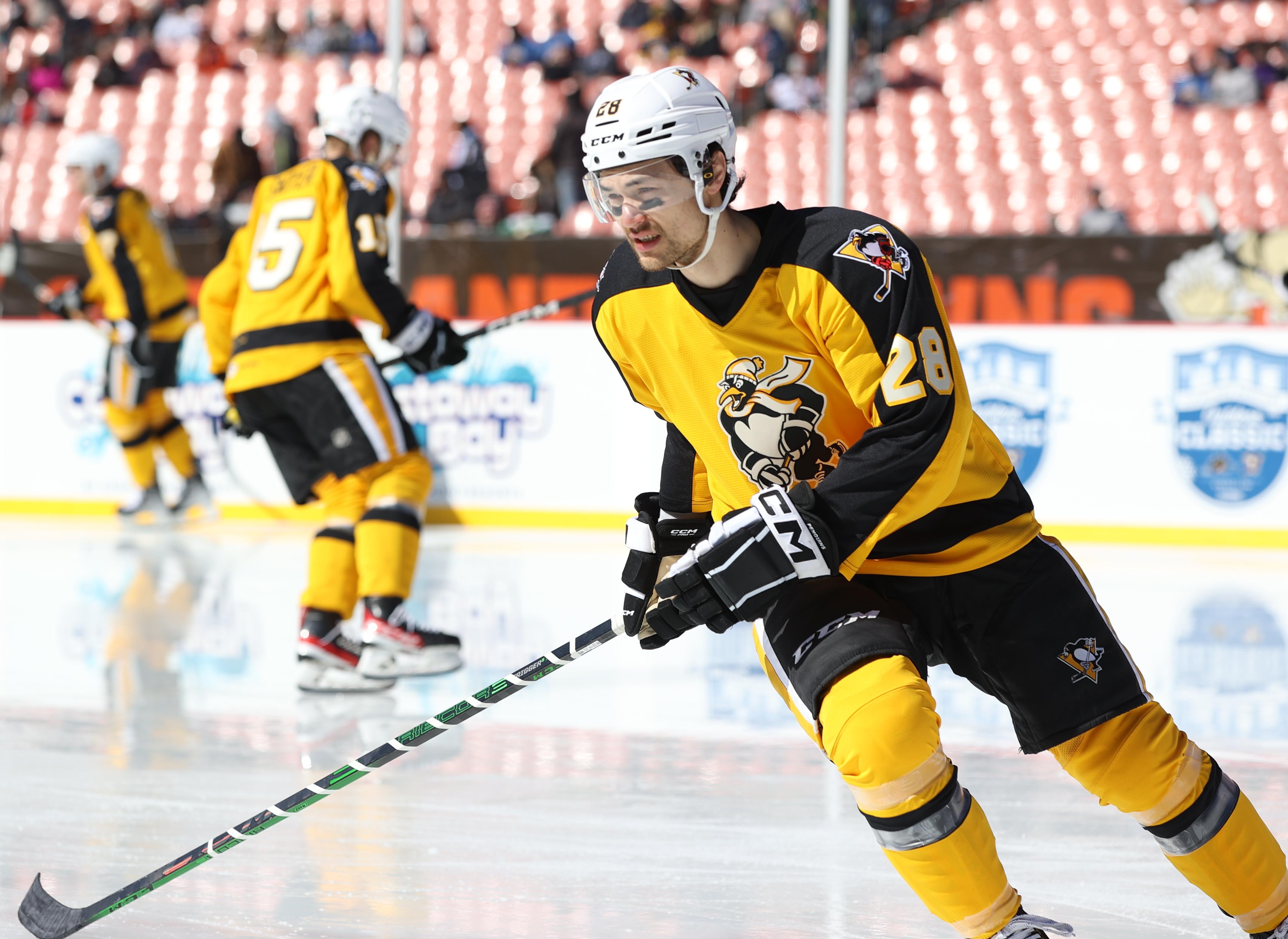
- Sikura with the Wilkes-Barre/Scranton Penguins in 2023
- Born: May 18, 1992 (age 34) Aurora, Ontario, Canada
- Height: 6 ft 0 in (183 cm)
- Weight: 194 lb (88 kg; 13 st 12 lb)
- Position: Centre
- Shot: Left
- Played for: Springfield Falcons; Portland Pirates; Iowa Wild; Rockford IceHogs; Cleveland Monsters; Wilkes-Barre/Scranton Penguins; HC Bolzano
- NHL draft: Undrafted
- Playing career: 2015–2024

Tyler Sikura (born May 18, 1992) is a Canadian former professional ice hockey centre.

== Playing career ==
Tyler Sikura played midget hockey in the Markham Waxers system, then played two years of Junior A hockey with the Newmarket Hurricanes. Sikura played four years for the Dartmouth Big Green, where he was named a first team Ivy League All Star in 2013. He captained the Big Green for his final two seasons. Following his collegiate career, he played a pair of games for the Springfield Falcons of the American Hockey League (AHL).

He spent most of the next two years with the Toledo Walleye of the ECHL before being traded to the Manchester Monarchs. In 2017, Sikura landed a spot on the Rockford IceHogs, the AHL affiliate of the Chicago Blackhawks. He scored over 20 goals and earned a contract from the Blackhawks for the following season. As well, he tied a franchise record for most consecutive games with goals scored with five. At the conclusion of the 2017–18 season, Sikura was named the teams Most Valuable Player.

On July 1, 2019, Sikura continued his tenure with the Rockford IceHogs, returning on a one-year AHL contract. He was subsequently named an alternate captain alongside Jacob Nilsson and Matthew Highmore. In the 2019–20 season, Sikura posted 14 goals and 20 assists for 34 points in 63 appearances with the IceHogs before the season was cancelled due to the COVID-19 pandemic.

As a free agent, Sikura left the IceHogs to sign a one-year contract to continue in the AHL with the Cleveland Monsters on October 14, 2020. In the pandemic shortened 2020–21 season, Sikura increased his offensive output, registering 21 points in just 29 regular season games. On July 28, 2021, he was signed by the Monsters' NHL affiliate, the Columbus Blue Jackets to a one-year, two-way contract.

After two seasons within the Blue Jackets organization, Sikura left as a free agent and continued his career in the AHL, agreeing to a one-year contract with the Wilkes-Barre/Scranton Penguins, affiliate to the Pittsburgh Penguins, on October 3, 2022.

== Personal life ==
Sikura's brother Dylan also plays professional hockey and was drafted by the Chicago Blackhawks in 2014. Sikura is half Slovak. His grandfather escaped Czechoslovakia and arrived in Nova Scotia in the 1950s. He ran a thoroughbred race horse breeding farm, Hill 'n' Dale Farms, until his death, in which it was taken over by Sikura's uncle and father.

== Career statistics ==
			Regular season					Playoffs
Season	Team	League	GP	G	A	Pts	PIM	GP	G	A	Pts	PIM
2008–09	Markham Waxers	OJHL	—	—	—	—	—	3	0	0	0	0
2009–10	Newmarket Hurricanes	OJHL	49	11	24	35	12	19	8	11	19	14
2010–11	Newmarket Hurricanes	OJHL	39	21	33	54	6	12	3	6	9	8
2011–12	Dartmouth College	ECAC	33	11	14	25	12	—	—	—	—	—
2012–13	Dartmouth College	ECAC	34	12	20	32	25	—	—	—	—	—
2013–14	Dartmouth College	ECAC	25	3	8	11	8	—	—	—	—	—
2014–15	Dartmouth College	ECAC	33	10	14	24	16	—	—	—	—	—
2014–15	Springfield Falcons	AHL	2	0	0	0	0	—	—	—	—	—
2015–16	Toledo Walleye	ECHL	68	16	32	48	30	7	0	1	1	4
2015–16	Portland Pirates	AHL	4	0	0	0	0	—	—	—	—	—
2016–17	Toledo Walleye	ECHL	39	13	16	29	8	—	—	—	—	—
2016–17	Iowa Wild	AHL	16	0	0	0	0	—	—	—	—	—
2016–17	Manchester Monarchs	ECHL	8	1	4	5	2	19	5	6	11	10
2017–18	Rockford IceHogs	AHL	74	23	16	39	18	13	5	1	6	2
2018–19	Rockford IceHogs	AHL	50	7	12	19	20	—	—	—	—	—
2019–20	Rockford IceHogs	AHL	63	14	20	34	22	—	—	—	—	—
2020–21	Cleveland Monsters	AHL	29	11	10	21	10	—	—	—	—	—
2021–22	Cleveland Monsters	AHL	75	15	21	36	45	—	—	—	—	—
2022–23	Wilkes-Barre/Scranton Penguins	AHL	71	9	24	33	31	—	—	—	—	—
2023–24	HC Bolzano	ICEHL	14	3	3	6	0	—	—	—	—	—
AHL totals			384	79	103	182	146	13	5	1	6	2

== Awards and honours ==
Award	Year
College
All-Ivy League First Team	2013
