= Carl Dahlström =

Swedish ice hockey player (born 1995)

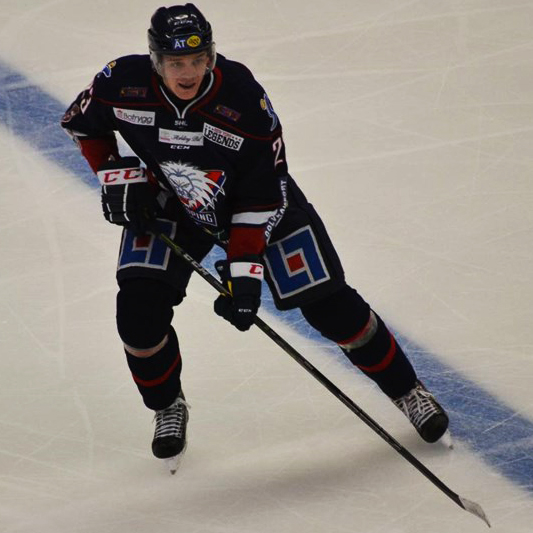
- Dahlström with Linköping HC in 2014
- Born: 28 January 1995 (age 31) Stockholm, Sweden
- Height: 6 ft 4 in (193 cm)
- Weight: 231 lb (105 kg; 16 st 7 lb)
- Position: Defence
- Shoots: Left
- NL team Former teams: HC Lugano; Linköping HC; Chicago Blackhawks; Winnipeg Jets; Toronto Maple Leafs; Färjestad BK
- NHL draft: 51st overall, 2013; Chicago Blackhawks
- Playing career: 2013–present

Carl Dahlström (born 28 January 1995) is a Swedish professional ice hockey defenceman for HC Lugano of the National League (NL). He was selected by the Chicago Blackhawks in the second round (51st overall) of the 2013 NHL entry draft.

== Playing career ==
Dahlström made his professional debut in Sweden with youth club, Linköping HC during the 2013 European Trophy. On 14 April 2016, Dahlström agreed to a three-year entry-level contract with the Chicago Blackhawks. He was immediately assigned to complete the 2015–16 season with AHL affiliate, the Rockford IceHogs.

During the 2017–18 season, Dahlström, along with teammate Matthew Highmore, were the only players from Rockford named to the 2018 AHL All-Star Classic. Dahlström made his NHL debut against the Minnesota Wild on 10 February 2018 where he had one shot on net. He recorded his first NHL point in a 7–1 win over the Washington Capitals on 17 February 2018.

On 27 March 2019, Dahlström signed a two-year contract extension with the Blackhawks. Before the 2019–20 season, as one of the last cuts by the Blackhawks for opening night roster, Dahlström was then claimed off of waivers by the Winnipeg Jets on 1 October 2019.

On 9 October 2020, Dahlström was traded to the Vegas Golden Knights, along with a 2022 4th-round pick, in exchange for Paul Stastny.

Following the 2020–21 season, on July 28, 2021, having left the Golden Knights as a free agent, Dahlström was signed to a one-year, two-way contract with the Toronto Maple Leafs.

After two seasons within the Maple Leafs organization, Dahlström, as an impending free agent, opted to return to his native Sweden following eight seasons in North America by signing a three-year contract with Färjestad BK of the SHL on 1 June 2023.

== Career statistics ==
			Regular season					Playoffs
Season	Team	League	GP	G	A	Pts	PIM	GP	G	A	Pts	PIM
2012–13	Linköping HC	J20	37	5	8	13	12	5	1	1	2	4
2013–14	Linköping HC	J20	23	2	12	14	6	—	—	—	—	—
2013–14	Linköping HC	SHL	12	0	1	1	0	14	1	2	3	2
2014–15	Linköping HC	J20	1	0	0	0	0	—	—	—	—	—
2014–15	Linköping HC	SHL	55	3	3	6	12	11	0	1	1	4
2015–16	Linköping HC	SHL	50	1	7	8	14	6	0	1	1	4
2015–16	Rockford IceHogs	AHL	4	0	0	0	6	3	0	1	1	2
2016–17	Rockford IceHogs	AHL	70	6	5	11	16	—	—	—	—	—
2017–18	Rockford IceHogs	AHL	64	3	25	28	22	13	3	6	9	4
2017–18	Chicago Blackhawks	NHL	11	0	3	3	0	—	—	—	—	—
2018–19	Rockford IceHogs	AHL	22	1	7	8	10	—	—	—	—	—
2018–19	Chicago Blackhawks	NHL	38	0	6	6	6	—	—	—	—	—
2019–20	Winnipeg Jets	NHL	15	0	1	1	6	—	—	—	—	—
2020–21	Henderson Silver Knights	AHL	17	1	9	10	4	2	0	0	0	0
2021–22	Toronto Marlies	AHL	49	0	14	14	10	—	—	—	—	—
2021–22	Toronto Maple Leafs	NHL	3	0	2	2	2	—	—	—	—	—
2022–23	Toronto Marlies	AHL	8	0	1	1	2	7	1	0	1	4
2023–24	Färjestad BK	SHL	50	1	14	15	6	4	0	2	2	2
SHL totals			167	5	25	30	32	35	1	6	7	12
NHL totals			67	0	12	12	14	—	—	—	—	—
