= 2013–14 Boston College Eagles men's ice hockey season =

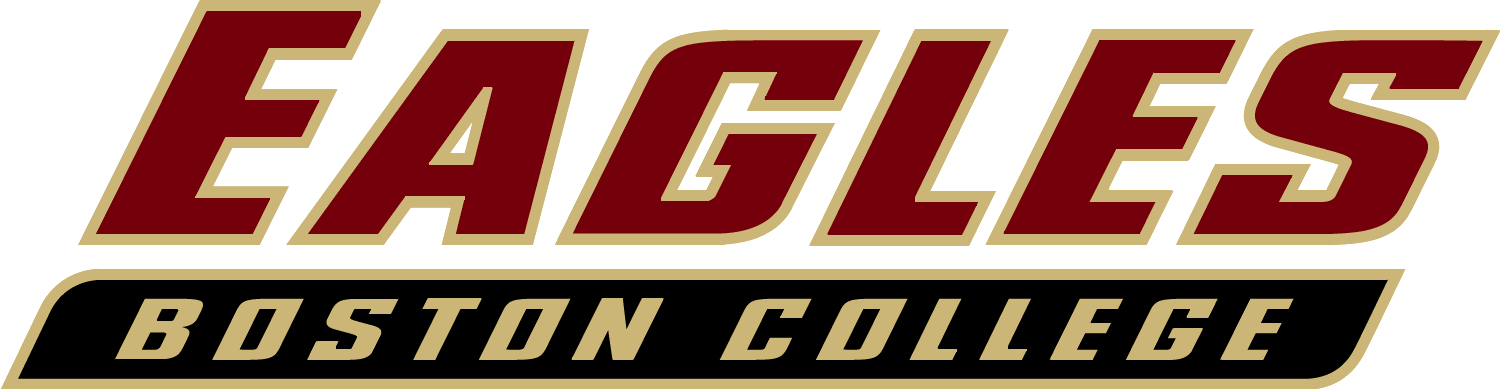

Beanpot championship, W 4–1 vs. Northeastern Three Rivers Classic championship, W 8–2 vs. Penn State Hockey East regular season champions L 5–4 vs. Union in the Frozen Four
- Conference: Hockey East
- Home ice: Kelley Rink

Rankings
- USA Today/USA Hockey Magazine: #3 (Final)
- USCHO.com/CBS College Sports: #3 (Final)

Record
- Overall: 28–8–4; 16–2–2
- Home: 11–4–1
- Road: 10–3–3
- Neutral: 7–1–0

Coaches and captains
- Head coach: Jerry York
- Assistant coaches: Greg Brown; Mike Ayers; Marty McInnis
- Captain: Patrick Brown
- Alternate captain(s): Bill Arnold, Isaac MacLeod

The 2013–14 Boston College Eagles men's ice hockey team represented Boston College in the 2013–14 NCAA Division I men's ice hockey season. The team was coached by Jerry York, '67, his twentieth season behind the bench at Boston College. The Eagles played their home games at Kelley Rink on the campus of Boston College, competing in Hockey East.

With the addition of the Notre Dame Fighting Irish to Hockey East, the Holy War rivalry extended to conference play between the Eagles and the Irish. The two teams played each other at Fenway Park on January 4 during the league's Frozen Fenway exhibit, where the Eagles topped the Irish in a 4–3 contest, and both teams played their final game of the season against each other at Kelley Rink on February 28, with the Irish winning 2–1 in overtime.

The Eagles competed in two tournaments during the 2013–14 season. The first tournament, on December 27–28, the Eagles played in the 2nd Annual Three Rivers Classic, played at the Consol Energy Center in Pittsburgh, where they defeated Bowling Green 5–0 in the first round and then won the championship by beating Penn State 8–2 in the second round. On February 3 and 10, the Eagles won their 5th straight championship in the 62nd Annual Beanpot Tournament, played at the TD Garden in Boston, Massachusetts, defeating Boston University 3–1 in the first round and Northeastern in the championship round by a score of 4–1.

The Eagles finished the season 28–8–4, 16–2–2 in conference play, capturing the Hockey East regular season title. However, they did not advance far into the Hockey East tournament, losing the best-of-three quarterfinals to rival Notre Dame in three games, at home. They would, however, succeed in the NCAA tournament, where they would win the Northeast Regional, played at the DCU Center in Worcester. A victory over Hockey East foe UMass Lowell advanced the Eagles to the program's 24th Frozen Four (tying Michigan for most appearances), but would lose to the eventual champions, the Union Dutchmen in the semi-final.

== Previous season recap ==
The Eagles entered the 2013–14 season following a first round loss to Union College in the NCAA tournament, and a semifinals loss to Boston University in the Hockey East Tournament. Their postseason woes do not accurately reflect the success of the season, as the Eagles finished with a strong 22–12–4 record and 15–9–3 in conference play, one point short of the regular season title, as well as their fourth consecutive Beanpot championship in a 6–3 win over Northeastern. Sophomore Johnny Gaudreau was a Hobey Baker award finalist after helping the US National Junior team to win a gold medal at the 2013 World Junior championship in Ufa, Russia. Head Coach Jerry York became the winningest head coach in NCAA Hockey history, passing Ron Mason, with his 925th win over Alabama-Huntsville in the 2012 Mariucci Classic.

== Offseason ==
Six Senior Eagles graduated in May: Captain Pat Mullane – F, Assistant Captain Steven Whitney – F, Brooks Dyroff – F, Assistant Captain Patrick Wey – D, Patch Alber – F, and Parker Milner – G.

Sophomore forward Johnny Gaudreau decided to remain at school for another season, to play with his younger brother Matt Gaudreau, who enrolled as a freshman this year.

Junior forward Patrick Brown was named Captain, with fellow juniors Bill Arnold and Isaac MacLeod named Assistant Captains for the 2013–14 season.

Long-time assistant coach Mike Cavanaugh left the team to become the head coach of the UConn Huskies hockey program.

Associate head coach Greg Brown was named an Assistant Head Coach for the 2014 US World Junior team that competed in Malmö, Sweden.

Long-time assistant coach and goaltending coach Jim Logue announced his retirement after twenty years of coaching.

Boston College hired Mike Ayers as an assistant coach and goaltending coach to replace Cavanaugh. Ayers spent his previous seasons coaching goalies on the US National Development Team

Former NHL player and Boston College alum Marty McInnis was hired on Sep. 12 as an assistant coach to fill the vacancy left by Jim Logue. McInnis played nearly 800 career games in the NHL and was inducted into the Boston College Varsity Club Athletic Hall of Fame in 2012.

In July, Connor McGlynn, who previously committed to joining Boston College in the fall of the 2013–14 season, signed with the Kingston Frontenacs of the OHL.

== Recruiting ==
Boston College added ten freshmen for the 2013–14 season: six forwards, three defensemen, and a goaltender. A total of five of the ten incoming freshmen have been drafted in either the 2012 or the 2013 NHL drafts.

- Ian McCoshen, D – Drafted with the first pick of the second round (31st overall) in the 2013 draft, by the Florida Panthers. He joins Mike Matheson as two of Florida's top defensive prospects, and potentially could be paired together in the NHL. McCoshen played for the Waterloo Blackhawks of the USHL.
- Scott Savage, D – Played on the USNTDP U-18 team with fellow Eagle recruit Steven Santini. Was originally expected to be drafted in 2013 but was passed over.
- Steven Santini, D – Drafted with the twelfth pick in the second round (42nd overall) in the 2013 draft by the New Jersey Devils. Played with fellow recruit Scott Savage on the USNTDP U-18 team.
- Adam Gilmour, F – Drafted 98th Overall in the fourth round of the 2012 draft by the Minnesota Wild. He played for the Muskegon Lumberjacks of the USHL. He also played with fellow Eagle recruit Chris Calnan on the Nobles in the Mass. prep league before joining the USHL.
- Evan Richardson, F – Played for the Powell River Kings of the BCHL. Was a leading scorer on the Kings with a near point/game average.
- Chris Calnan, F – Drafted 79th Overall in the third round of the 2012 draft by the Chicago Blackhawks. Played on the South Shore Kings of the EJHL, and previously played with fellow recruit Adam Gilmour on the Nobles of the Mass. prep league.
- Austin Cangelosi, F – An electric playmaker who played for the Youngstown Phantoms of the USHL.
- Ryan Fitzgerald, F – Drafted 120th overall with the last pick in the 4th round of the 2013 draft by the Boston Bruins, Ryan is a North Reading, MA native. He is a promising prospect, having been playing for the Valley Jr. Warriors of the EJHL. He also made a name for himself at the World U-17 Hockey Challenge by scoring 4 goals for the US and was also named MVP at the 2012 All-American Prospects Game.
- Matt Gaudreau, F – Younger brother of the star of the Eagles, Johnny Gaudreau, Matt played on the Omaha Lancers of the USHL, although he does not share the electric style of play his brother exhibits.
- Thatcher Demko, G – Demko is a highly touted goaltender who took over for Parker Milner. Demko isn't eligible for the draft until 2014 but is expected to be a first round pick. He was one of the top North American goalie prospects, posting a 31–9–3 record, a 2.06 GAA and a .912% save percentage playing for the U-18 USNTDP team. He also backstopped the US U-18 team to a silver medal at the 2013 IIHF World U18 Championships in Sochi, Russia. He was the goaltending leader at the 2012 World U-17 Hockey Challenge and also posted a period-and-a-half shutout at the 2013 All-American Prospects Game on September 26.

Player	Position	Nationality	Notes
Ian McCoshen	Defense	United States	Hudson, WI; Selected 31st overall by FLA in the 2013 draft.
Scott Savage	Defense	United States	San Clemente, CA; Played for the US U-18 team.
Steven Santini	Defense	United States	Mahopac, NY; Selected 42nd overall by NJD in the 2013 draft.
Adam Gilmour	Forward	United States	Hanover, MA; Selected 98th overall by MIN in the 2012 draft.
Evan Richardson	Forward	Canada	Nanaimo, B.C.; Played for the Powell River Kings of the BCHL.
Chris Calnan	Forward	United States	Norwell, MA; Selected 79th Overall by CHI in the 2012 Draft.
Austin Cangelosi	Forward	United States	Estero, FL; Played for the Youngstown Phantoms of the USHL.
Ryan Fitzgerald	Forward	United States	North Reading, MA; Selected 120th Overall by BOS in the 2013 draft.
Matthew Gaudreau	Forward	United States	Carney's Point, NJ; Joins older brother Johnny, played for Omaha Lancers of the USHL.
Thatcher Demko	Goaltender	United States	San Diego, CA; Played for the US U-18 Team. Won a silver medal at the 2013 U18 World Juniors.

== 2013–2014 Roster ==
=== Departures from 2012–2013 Team ===
- Steven Whitney, F – Graduation – Signed a try-out contract with the Anaheim Ducks AHL affiliate, the Norfolk Admirals.
- Brooks Dyroff, F – Graduation
- Pat Mullane, F – Graduation
- Patrick Wey, D – Graduation – Signed a two year, entry level contract with his drafted team, the Washington Capitals.
- Patch Alber, D – Graduation
- Parker Milner, G – Graduation – Signed by the New York Islanders, likely to be assigned to their AHL affiliate, the Bridgeport Sound Tigers.
- Mike Cavanaugh, Associate head coach – Job Change – Left to become the head coach of the UConn Huskies ice hockey team.
- Jim Logue, Assistant Coach – Retirement
- Colin Sullivan – Team Withdrawal – After playing in the exhibition game against St. Francis Xavier, Sullivan withdrew from the team due to the likelihood of receiving little to no playing time (due to the more skilled incoming freshman class). As a 7th round draft pick of the Montreal Canadiens, Sullivan chose to explore other options rather than stay with the team. He later signed with the Green Bay Gamblers of the USHL.

=== 2013–14 Eagles ===
As of October 3, 2013.

No.	Nat.	Player	Class	Pos	Height	Weight	DoB	Hometown	Previous team	NHL rights
1		Brian Billet	Junior	G	6' 1" (1.85 m)	185 lb (84 kg)	1992-03-19	Brunswick, Maine	New Hampshire (EJHL)	—
3		Ian McCoshen	Freshman	D	6' 3" (1.91 m)	206 lb (93 kg)	1995-08-05	Faribault, Minnesota	Waterloo (USHL)	FLA, 31st overall 2013
4		Teddy Doherty	Sophomore	D	5' 9" (1.75 m)	178 lb (81 kg)	1994-04-25	Hopkinton, Massachusetts	Dubuque (USHL)	—
5		Michael Matheson	Sophomore	D	6' 2" (1.88 m)	189 lb (86 kg)	1994-02-27	Pointe-Claire, Quebec	Dubuque (USHL)	FLA, 23rd overall 2012
6		Steven Santini	Freshman	D	6' 2" (1.88 m)	201 lb (91 kg)	1995-03-07	Mahopac, New York	US NTDP (USHL)	NJD, 42nd overall 2013
7		Isaac MacLeod (A)	Senior	D	6' 5" (1.96 m)	214 lb (97 kg)	1992-02-22	Nelson, British Columbia	Penticton (BCHL)	SJS, 136th overall 2010
8		Travis Jeke	Sophomore	D	6' 2" (1.88 m)	192 lb (87 kg)	1993-06-11	Pittsburgh, Pennsylvania	Northwood (USHS–NY)	—
9		Brendan Silk	Sophomore	F	6' 3" (1.91 m)	190 lb (86 kg)	1994-01-13	Wakefield, Massachusetts	US NTDP (USHL)	—
10		Danny Linell	Junior	F	5' 7" (1.7 m)	178 lb (81 kg)	1992-09-04	Great Neck, New York	Choate (USHS–CT)	—
11		Chris Calnan	Freshman	F	6' 2" (1.88 m)	200 lb (91 kg)	1994-05-05	Norwell, Massachusetts	South Shore (EJHL)	CHI, 79th overall 2012
12		Kevin Hayes	Senior	F	6' 3" (1.91 m)	213 lb (97 kg)	1992-05-08	Dorchester, Massachusetts	Nobles (USHS–MA)	CHI, 24th overall 2010
13		Johnny Gaudreau	Junior	F	5' 8" (1.73 m)	153 lb (69 kg)	1993-08-13	Carneys Point, New Jersey	Dubuque (USHL)	CGY, 104th overall 2011
14		Adam Gilmour	Freshman	F	6' 3" (1.91 m)	193 lb (88 kg)	1994-01-29	Hanover, Massachusetts	Muskegon (USHL)	MIN, 98th overall 2012
15		Cam Spiro	Junior	F	5' 10" (1.78 m)	204 lb (93 kg)	1991-12-30	Hingham, Massachusetts	Tabor (USHS–MA)	—
17		Destry Straight	Junior	F	6' 1" (1.85 m)	190 lb (86 kg)	1993-03-22	West Vancouver, British Columbia	Coquitlam (BCHL)	—
18		Michael Sit	Junior	F	5' 10" (1.78 m)	171 lb (78 kg)	1993-02-04	Edina, Minnesota	Edina (USHS–MN)	—
19		Ryan Fitzgerald	Freshman	F	5' 9" (1.75 m)	166 lb (75 kg)	1994-10-19	North Reading, Massachusetts	Valley Jr. Warriors (EJHL)	BOS, 120th overall 2013
20		Peter McMullen	Sophomore	F	6' 1" (1.85 m)	209 lb (95 kg)	1993-02-19	Essex Fells, New Jersey	Delbarton (USHS-NJ)	—
21		Mathew Gaudreau	Freshman	F	5' 9" (1.75 m)	135 lb (61 kg)	1994-12-05	Carneys Point, New Jersey	Omaha (USHL)	—
22		Evan Richardson	Freshman	F	5' 8" (1.73 m)	167 lb (76 kg)	1994-05-30	Nanaimo, British Columbia	Powell River (BCHL)	—
23		Patrick Brown (C)	Senior	F	6' 1" (1.85 m)	207 lb (94 kg)	1992-05-29	Bloomfield Hills, Michigan	Cranbrook-Kingswood (USHS–MI)	—
24		Bill Arnold (A)	Senior	F	6' 0" (1.83 m)	206 lb (93 kg)	1992-05-13	Needham, Massachusetts	US NTDP (USHL)	CGY, 108th overall 2010
26		Austin Cangelosi	Freshman	F	5' 6" (1.68 m)	171 lb (78 kg)	1994-08-27	Estero, Florida	Youngstown (USHL)	—
27		Quinn Smith	Junior	F	5' 8" (1.73 m)	173 lb (78 kg)	1992-01-11	Fairfield, Connecticut	Avon Old Farms (USHS–CT)	—
28		Scott Savage	Freshman	D	6' 1" (1.85 m)	185 lb (84 kg)	1995-04-11	San Clemente, California	US NTDP (USHL)	—
29		Brad Barone	Junior	G	5' 10" (1.78 m)	179 lb (81 kg)	1990-12-02	Medfield, Massachusetts	South Shore (EJHL)	—
30		Thatcher Demko	Freshman	G	6' 3" (1.91 m)	192 lb (87 kg)	1995-12-08	San Diego, California	US NTDP (USHL)	VAN, 36th overall 2014

=== Coaching staff ===
Name	Position	Seasons at Boston College	Alma mater
Jerry York	Head Coach	20	Boston College (1967)
Greg Brown	Associate head coach	10	Boston College (1990)
Mike Ayers	Assistant coach	1	University of New Hampshire (2004)
Marty McInnis	Assistant coach	1	Boston College (1992)

== Standings ==
2013–14 Hockey East men's standings
	Conference record							Overall record					
	GP	W	L	T	PTS	GF	GA	GP	W	L	T	GF	GA
#3 Boston College^{†}	20	16	2	2	34	75	40	40	28	8	4	164	94
#5 Massachusetts–Lowell*	20	11	6	3	25	54	43	41	26	11	4	116	77
#10 Providence	20	11	7	2	24	50	49	39	22	11	6	115	88
#18 New Hampshire	20	11	9	0	22	64	51	41	22	18	1	126	106
#19 Northeastern	20	10	8	2	22	52	51	37	19	14	4	117	103
Maine	20	9	8	3	21	59	48	35	16	15	4	102	83
#14 Vermont	20	10	10	0	20	49	48	38	20	15	3	105	89
#9 Notre Dame	20	9	9	2	20	43	40	40	23	15	2	120	86
Boston University	20	5	12	3	13	43	66	35	10	21	4	81	113
Massachusetts	20	4	13	3	11	42	61	34	8	22	4	76	106
Merrimack	20	3	15	2	8	32	66	33	8	22	3	62	97
Championship: Massachusetts–Lowell † indicates conference regular season champion; * indicates conference tournament champion Rankings: USCHO.com Top 20 Poll; updated March 23, 2014

== Schedule ==
=== Regular season ===
Date	Time	Opponent^{#}	Rank^{#}	Site	TV	Result	Attendance	Record
Exhibition
October 6	1:00 pm	St. Francis Xavier*	#4	Kelley Rink • Chestnut Hill, Massachusetts		W 8–2	522	
Regular season
October 10	7:00 pm	at #11 Michigan*	#4	Yost Ice Arena • Ann Arbor, Michigan	FSN	L 1–3	5,093	0–1–0
October 13	3:00 pm	#15 RPI*	#4	Kelley Rink • Chestnut Hill, Massachusetts		W 7–2	3,915	1–1–0
October 18	7:00 pm	#2 Wisconsin*	#7	Kelley Rink • Chestnut Hill, Massachusetts		W 9–2	7,008	2–1–0
October 25	8:00 pm	at #1 Minnesota*	#5	Mariucci Arena • Minneapolis, Minnesota	BTN	T 3–3 ^{OT}	9,941	2–1–1
October 27	2:00 pm	at #1 Minnesota*	#5	Mariucci Arena • Minneapolis, Minnesota	BTN	L 1–6	9,723	2–2–1
November 1	8:00 pm	#19 Northeastern	#8	Kelley Rink • Chestnut Hill, Massachusetts	NBCSN	W 4–2	6,412	3–2–1 (1–0–0)
November 2	7:00 pm	at #19 Northeastern	#8	Matthews Arena • Boston, Massachusetts		W 4–3 ^{OT}	4,746	4–2–1 (2–0–0)
November 8	7:30 pm	at #17 Boston University	#8	Agganis Arena • Boston, Massachusetts (Green Line Rivalry)		W 5–1	6,150	5–2–1 (3–0–0)
November 10	3:00 pm	Army*	#8	Kelley Rink • Chestnut Hill, Massachusetts		W 11–0	5,492	6–2–1 (3–0–0)
November 14	7:30 pm	at UMass	#7	William D. Mullins Center • Amherst, Massachusetts		W 2–1	3,952	7–2–1 (4–0–0)
November 15	7:00 pm	UMass	#7	Kelley Rink • Chestnut Hill, Massachusetts		T 2–2 ^{OT}	6,248	7–2–2 (4–0–1)
November 20	7:00 pm	at Harvard*	#7	Bright Hockey Center • Boston, Massachusetts		W 5–1	2,422	8–2–2 (4–0–1)
November 23	7:00 pm	at Maine	#7	Alfond Arena • Orono, Maine		L 1–5	5,125	8–3–2 (4–1–1)
November 29	4:00 pm	Holy Cross*	#7	Kelley Rink • Chestnut Hill, Massachusetts		L 4–5	6,527	8–4–2 (4–1–1)
December 6	7:00 pm	#18 New Hampshire	#9	Kelley Rink • Chestnut Hill, Massachusetts		W 6–2	6,277	9–4–2 (5–1–1)
December 7	7:00 pm	at #18 New Hampshire	#9	Whittemore Center • Durham, New Hampshire	FCS	W 2–1	6,501	10–4–2 (6–1–1)
December 27	4:35 pm	vs. Bowling Green*	#7	Consol Energy Center • Pittsburgh, Pennsylvania (Three Rivers Classic)		W 5–0	8,533	11–4–2 (6–1–1)
December 28	7:35 pm	vs. Penn State*	#7	Consol Energy Center • Pittsburgh, Pennsylvania (Three Rivers Classic)		W 8–2	8,222	12–4–2 (6–1–1)
January 4	7:30 pm	vs. #14 Notre Dame	#6	Fenway Park • Boston, Massachusetts (2014 Frozen Fenway, Holy War)	NESN	W 4–3	31,569	13–4–2 (7–1–1)
January 10	7:00 pm	#6 Providence	#5	Kelley Rink • Chestnut Hill, Massachusetts		W 5–2	7,884	14–4–2 (8–1–1)
January 11	7:00 pm	at Brown*	#5	Meehan Auditorium • Providence, Rhode Island		T 3–3 ^{OT}	2,165	14–4–3 (8–1–1)
January 17	7:00 pm	Boston University	#4	Kelley Rink • Chestnut Hill, Massachusetts (Green Line Rivalry)	NESN	W 6–4	7,884	15–4–3 (9–1–1)
January 18	7:00 pm	#19 Maine	#4	Kelley Rink • Chestnut Hill, Massachusetts		W 7–2	6,714	16–4–3 (10–1–1)
January 21	7:00 pm	at Merrimack	#2	J. Thom Lawler Arena • North Andover, Massachusetts		W 4–1	2,549	17–4–3 (11–1–1)
January 25	7:00 pm	at Penn State*	#2	Pegula Ice Arena • State College, Pennsylvania		W 3–2	6,214	18–4–3 (11–1–1)
January 31	7:00 pm	at #7 Providence	#2	Schneider Arena • Providence, Rhode Island		W 2–0	2,978	19–4–3 (12–1–1)
February 3	8:00 pm	vs. Boston University*	#2	TD Garden • Boston, Massachusetts (Beanpot, Green Line Rivalry)	NESN	W 3–1	14,776	20–4–3 (12–1–1)
February 7	7:00 pm	Merrimack	#2	Kelley Rink • Chestnut Hill, Massachusetts		W 6–1	5,772	21–4–3 (13–1–1)
February 10	7:30 pm	vs. #12 Northeastern*	#1	TD Garden • Boston, Massachusetts (Beanpot championship)	NESN	W 4–1	17,565	22–4–3 (13–1–1)
February 14	7:05 pm	at #15 Vermont	#1	Gutterson Fieldhouse • Burlington, Vermont		W 4–3	4,007	23–4–3 (14–1–1)
February 15	7:05 pm	at #15 Vermont	#1	Gutterson Fieldhouse • Burlington, Vermont		W 5–3	4,007	24–4–3 (15–1–1)
February 21	7:00 pm	#7 UMass Lowell	#1	Kelley Rink • Chestnut Hill, Massachusetts		W 3–0	6,524	25–4–3 (16–1–1)
February 22	7:00 pm	at #7 UMass Lowell	#1	Tsongas Center • Lowell, Massachusetts		T 2–2 ^{OT}	7,649	25–4–4 (16–1–2)
February 28	4:00 pm	#14 Notre Dame	#1	Kelley Rink • Chestnut Hill, Massachusetts (Holy War)	NESN	L 2–1 ^{OT}	7,884	25–5–4 (16–2–2)
Hockey East Tournament
March 14	7:00 pm	#11 Notre Dame*	#2	Kelley Rink • Chestnut Hill, Massachusetts (Hockey East Quarterfinals, Holy War)		L 7–2	5,525	25–6–4 (16–2–2)
March 15	4:00 pm	#11 Notre Dame*	#2	Kelley Rink • Chestnut Hill, Massachusetts (Hockey East Quarterfinals, Holy War)	NESN	W 4–2	4,537	26–6–4 (16–2–2)
March 16	4:30 pm	#11 Notre Dame*	#2	Kelley Rink • Chestnut Hill, Massachusetts (Hockey East Quarterfinals, Holy War)	NESN	L 4–2	3,246	26–7–4 (16–2–2)
NCAA Tournament
March 29	4:00pm	vs. #17 Denver*	#3	DCU Center • Worcester, Massachusetts (NCAA Northeast Regional semifinal)	ESPNU	W 6–2	6,522	27–7–4 (16–2–2)
March 30	5:00pm	vs. #5 UMass Lowell*	#3	DCU Center • Worcester, Massachusetts (NCAA Northeast Regional final)	ESPNU	W 4–3	5,474	28–7–4 (16–2–2)
April 10	5:00pm	vs. #1 Union*	#3	Wells Fargo Center • Philadelphia, Pennsylvania (Frozen Four)	ESPN2	L 5–4	17,311	28–8–4 (16–2–2)
*Non-conference game. ^{#}Rankings from USCHO.com Poll. All times are in Eastern Time.

- On October 18, Boston College hosted Jerry York Night, an evening which commemorated the head coach's recent accomplishment of becoming the winningest head coach in NCAA Hockey history. The event was supposed to have been held during the 2012–13 season but was postponed twice, once due to blizzard, and a second time due to York's absence as a result of a detached retina. The evening consisted of a speech by athletic director Brad Bates congratulating York on his accomplishment, a short video of York's life and road to win #925, and a new banner was unveiled in the rafters which reads "Jerry York '67: NCAA Record Wins 1972–present". York then made a short speech giving thanks to the school, fans, etc. The #7 Eagles defeated the #2 Badgers in a 9–2 rout, their first matchup since meeting in the 2010 NCAA national championship game, in which the Eagles won in a 5–0 shutout to secure their fourth national championship and third under York.
- On November 8, BC and BU played their first matchup that did not include former Terrier head coach Jack Parker since 1974. Parker retired at the end of the previous season after 40 years of coaching at BU. It was the first non York-Parker matchup since 1994, when York first became the head coach at BC. The Eagles won 5–1. The previous day, November 7, York signed a contract extension to stay as the head coach of the Eagles through 2020, another six seasons of coaching. The game also ended an 8–game streak of the Eagles playing against ranked opponents.
- On November 10, the day before Veterans Day, BC and Army played their first meeting since October 22, 1994, which happened to be Jerry York's first game coaching at Boston College. BC won 11–0 and continued its 25-game winning streak against Army, leading the all-time series 36–3–1. It was also Army's first time visiting Conte Forum.
- On December 6, the last home game before the holiday break, the team honored long-time assistant coach and former Eagles net-minder Jim Logue, who retired at the end of the previous season after 20 years of coaching at BC.
- On December 27 and 28, the Eagles played in the 2nd Annual Three Rivers Classic played at the Consol Energy Center in Pittsburgh, defeating Bowling Green 5–0 in the first round and winning the championship with an 8–2 win over Penn State in the second round. Eagles freshman Ian McCoshen, Steven Santini and Thatcher Demko were not available for the tournament, as they were representing team USA in the 2014 World Juniors in Malmö, Sweden.
- On January 4, the Eagles defeated rival Notre Dame 4–3 at Fenway Park during the league's third Frozen Fenway exhibit. The Eagles are now 2–1 playing at Fenway Park, having previously played at the home of the Boston Red Sox in 2010, a 3–2 loss to Boston University, and 2012, a 2–1 win over Northeastern.
- On January 10, the Eagles downed #6 Providence in a 5–2 win in which senior Bill Arnold scored his 50th career goal and senior Kevin Hayes scored his 100th career point. Senior captain Patrick Brown scored the game winning power-play goal in his 100th career game.
- On January 17, the Eagles defeated archrival Boston University 6–4 at home, earning coach Jerry York his milestone 950th career victory.
- On February 3, Boston College beat rival Boston University 4–1 in the first round of the Beanpot tournament to advance to their fifth straight title game.
- On February 10, Boston College defeated Northeastern 4–1 at the TD Garden to win their program-record fifth consecutive Beanpot championship and school's nineteenth title and eighth under coach York.
- On February 15, Boston College defeated Vermont 5–3 to clinch the Hockey East Regular season trophy for best record in the conference.
- On February 22, Boston College tied UMass Lowell 2–2 to end an 11–game winning streak but kept their 19–game unbeaten streak intact.
- On March 1, the Eagles were defeated by rival Notre Dame 2–1 in overtime of the final regular season game to end their 19-game unbeaten streak.
- On March 14–16, the Eagles were defeated by rival Notre Dame in the Hockey East Quarterfinals losing two games of the best of the three series by scores of 7–2 in Game 1 and 4–2 in Game 3. BC forced the decisive third game by winning Game 2 by a score of 4–2. This marks the first time since 2004 that BC has been defeated in the quarterfinals and also the first time since 2004 that BC has not swept the quarterfinals. That year, they lost to 8th seeded BU in three games. Also during the final game of the series, Johnny Gaudreau's point streak ended at 31 games, tying the Hockey East record for longest point streak set by Paul Kariya of the University of Maine in the 1992–93 season.
- On March 19, the Hockey East conference announced the league's All-Rookie team, with freshman Thatcher Demko and Steven Santini getting honors, with Demko being a unanimous choice. The conference also awarded a number of league awards with BC players winning three of them. Those awards were: the 'Squad Locker' Scoring Champion to Johnny Gaudreau, who won the award for the second straight year with 36 points in 20 league games, the 'Gladiator' Best Defensive Forward title to Bill Arnold, who was a co-winner of the award, sharing it with Ross Mauermann of Providence, and lastly the 'Stop It' Goaltending Champion title to Thatcher Demko.
- On March 20, BC forwards Johnny Gaudreau and Kevin Hayes were named top 10 finalists for the Hobey Baker award. They were the only finalists representing the Hockey East conference.
- Also on March 20, the Hockey East conference announced the winners of the league's major awards, with junior forward Johnny Gaudreau repeating as Hockey Easy Player of the Year and coach Jerry York winning his third Coach of the Year award. The All-Star teams were also announced, with Gaudreau, Hayes and Matheson winning First-Team honors and Demko and Arnold earning Honorable Mentions.
- On March 29 and 30, playing in the NCAA tournament Northeast Regional in Worcester, BC advanced to their 24th Frozen Four with victories over Denver (6–2) in the semifinal and UMass Lowell (4–3) in the final. The top line of Gaudreau-Arnold-Hayes scored eight goals in the two games, with Gaudreau recording his first career hat trick in the victory over Denver.
- On April 2, Johnny Gaudreau was named a Hobey Hat Trick Finalist for the second straight year. The other finalists were Greg Carey of St. Lawrence University and Nic Dowd of St. Cloud State University.
- On April 10, the Union Dutchmen defeated BC in the Frozen Four semifinal by a score of 5–4. This marks the first time since 2006 that BC did not win the national championship on an even-numbered year. It also was the final game as a college player for Eagles seniors Kevin Hayes, Bill Arnold, Patrick Brown, and Isaac McLeod.
- On April 11, Johnny Gaudreau was announced as 2014's Hobey Baker Award winner, becoming the school's third recipient, joining David Emma (1991) and Mike Mottau (2000). Also announced were the ACHA Division I All American teams, with Gaudreau and Kevin Hayes earning First Team honors (Gaudreau's second year in a row), as well as Mike Matheson earning Second Team honors.
- After the Hobey Baker Award ceremony, Gaudreau and Arnold signed entry-level contracts with the Calgary Flames, with Arnold having graduated and Gaudreau choosing to forgo his senior year of NCAA eligibility. They both made their debut in the final game of the Flames' season on Sunday, April 12, against the Canucks in Vancouver. Gaudreau scored the only Flames goal in his first professional game.
- On April 12, Patrick Brown, now an undrafted free agent, signed a try-out contract with the Carolina Hurricanes.
- On May 8, Mike Matheson was named team captain for the 2014–15 season, with Quinn Smith and Michael Sit being named assistant captains.

== Rankings ==
Poll	Week																									
Poll	Pre	1	2	3	4	5	6	7	8	9	10	11	12	13	14	15	16	17	18	19	20	21	22	23	24	Final
USCHO.com	4	—	7	5	8	8	7	7	7	9	6	7	6	5	4	2	2	2	1	1	1	2	2	3	3	3
USA Today	4	4	6	5	7	8	7	7	6	9	6	6	—	4	3	2	2	2	1	1	1	2	2	3	3	3

== Statistics ==
=== Skaters ===
No.	Player	POS	YR	GP	G	A	Pts	PIM	PP	SHG	GWG	+/-	SOG
1	Brian Billett	G	JR	17	0	0	0	0	0	0	0	+31	0
3	Ian McCoshen	D	FR	35	5	8	13	48	0	1	1	+22	72
4	Teddy Doherty	D	SO	28	2	11	13	12	0	0	0	+12	46
5	Michael Matheson	D	SO	38	3	18	21	49	0	0	0	+18	90
6	Steven Santini	D	FR	36	3	8	11	52	0	0	0	+26	36
7	Isaac Macleod	D	SR	39	0	11	11	39	0	0	0	+8	39
8	Travis Jeke	D	SO	2	1	2	3	4	0	0	0	+4	4
9	Brendan Silk	F	SO	38	3	3	6	6	1	0	1	−1	32
10	Danny Linell	F	JR	34	1	12	13	10	1	0	0	−2	51
11	Chris Calnan	F	FR	37	4	9	13	23	0	1	0	+12	27
12	Kevin Hayes	F	SR	39	28	39	67	16	6	0	6	+34	140
13	Johnny Gaudreau	F	JR	40	36	44	80	14	10	1	7	+42	139
14	Adam Gilmour	F	FR	40	7	13	20	10	4	0	3	+6	78
15	Cam Spiro	F	JR	1	0	0	0	0	0	0	0	−1	3
17	Destry Straight	F	JR	25	6	5	11	10	0	0	2	+8	32
18	Michael Sit	F	JR	38	5	2	7	23	0	0	0	−11	43
19	Ryan Fitzgerald	F	FR	40	13	16	29	20	4	0	1	+8	66
20	Peter McMullen	F	SO	1	0	1	1	0	0	0	0	+1	4
21	Matt Gaudreau	F	FR	8	1	0	1	4	0	0	0	E	12
22	Evan Richardson	F	FR	4	2	0	2	0	0	0	0	+1	6
23	Patrick Brown	F	SR	40	15	15	30	30	6	2	4	+4	108
24	Bill Arnold	F	SR	40	14	39	53	53	2	2	1	+43	76
26	Austin Cangelosi	F	FR	40	10	15	25	6	0	0	1	+14	44
27	Quinn Smith	F	JR	40	2	9	11	25	0	0	1	−3	37
28	Scott Savage	F	FR	35	4	14	18	12	0	0	0	+13	57
29	Brad Barone	G	JR	4	0	0	0	0	0	0	0	+2	0
30	Thatcher Demko	G	FR	24	0	2	2	0	0	0	0	+18	0
	Team			40	164	297	461	468	34	7	28	+53	1272

=== Goaltenders ===
No.	Player	YR	GS	GP	MIN	W	L	T	GA	GAA	SA	SV	SV%	SO
1	Brian Billett	JR	16	17	916:22	12	3	1	37	2.42	464	427	.920	1
29	Brad Barone	JR	0	4	53:59	0	0	0	2	2.22	29	27	.931	0
30	Thatcher Demko	FR	24	24	1441:18	16	5	3	54	2.25	665	611	.919	2
	Empty Net				6:53				1					
	Team		40	40	2418:32	28	8	4	93	2.31	1158	1065	.920	4

- Although BC's goaltenders have only recorded three shutouts, the team has four, due to a combined shutout in an 11–0 win over Army on November 10.

== Awards and honors ==
Hobey Baker Award

- Johnny Gaudreau, F – Winner
- Kevin Hayes, F – Top 10 Finalist Archived 2014-03-21 at the Wayback Machine

ACHA Division I – All Americans

- Johnny Gaudreau, F – First Team Archived 2016-03-03 at the Wayback Machine
- Kevin Hayes, F – First Team Archived 2016-03-03 at the Wayback Machine
- Michael Matheson, D – Second Team Archived 2016-03-03 at the Wayback Machine

Hockey East Player of the Year

- Johnny Gaudreau, F – 2013–14 Archived 2015-02-14 at the Wayback Machine

Hockey East All-Stars

- Johnny Gaudreau. F – All-First Team Archived 2014-03-21 at the Wayback Machine
- Kevin Hayes, F – All-First Team Archived 2014-03-21 at the Wayback Machine
- Michael Matheson, D – All-First Team Archived 2014-03-21 at the Wayback Machine
- Thatcher Demko, G – All-Rookie Team, Honorable Mention Archived 2014-03-21 at the Wayback Machine
- Steven Santini, D – All-Rookie Team
- Bill Arnold, F – Honorable Mention

Hockey East Awards

- Johnny Gaudreau, F – 'Squad Locker' Scoring Champion, 36 Points
- Thatcher Demko, G – 'Stop It' Goaltending Champion
- Bill Arnold, F – 'Gladiator' Co-Best Defensive Forward

Hockey East Coach of the Year

- Jerry York – 2013–14 Archived 2015-02-14 at the Wayback Machine

National Player of the Month

- Johnny Gaudreau, F – Month of January

National Rookie of the Month

- Thatcher Demko, G – Month of January

Hockey East Player of the Month

- Johnny Gaudreau, F – Month of November Archived 2018-11-06 at the Wayback Machine, Month of January, Month of February, Month of March

Hockey East Goaltender of the Month

- Brian Billett, G – Month of December

Hockey East Rookie of the Month

- Ryan Fitzgerald, F – Month of November Archived 2018-11-06 at the Wayback Machine
- Thatcher Demko, G – Month of January

Hockey East Team of the Week

- Week of January 27, 2014, Week of February 17, 2014, Week of March 31, 2014

Hockey East Player of the Week

- Johnny Gaudreau, F – Week of November 11, 2013, Week of December 31, 2013, Week of March 31, 2014, Week of April 14, 2014 Archived April 15, 2014, at the Wayback Machine
- Kevin Hayes, F – Week of January 20, 2014
- Patrick Brown, F – Week of February 17, 2014

Hockey East Rookie of the Week

- Ryan Fitzgerald, F – Week of November 4, 2013, Week of April 14, 2014 Archived April 15, 2014, at the Wayback Machine
- Ian McCoshen, D – Week of March 31, 2014

Beanpot Most Valuable Player

- Kevin Hayes, F

Beanpot Eberly Award

- Thatcher Demko, G

62nd Walter Brown Award

- Johnny Gaudreau
