= 2014 Hockey East men's ice hockey tournament =

2014 Hockey East Men's ice hockey tournament
- Dates: March 7–22, 2014
- Teams: 11
- Finals site: TD Garden; Boston
- Champions: Massachusetts–Lowell (2nd title)
- Winning coach: Norm Bazin (2nd title)
- MVP: Connor Hellebuyck (UML)
- Hockey East Men's Ice Hockey Tournaments

The 2014 Hockey East Men's Ice Hockey Tournament was the 30th tournament in the history of the conference. It was played between March 7 and March 22, 2014 at campus locations and at the TD Garden in Boston, Massachusetts. The Massachusetts–Lowell River Hawks, the defending champions from the 2012–13 season, defeated New Hampshire 4-0 to repeat as champions and became the 7th team in league history to successfully defend their title. Sophomore goalie Connor Hellebuyck was named tournament MVP for his 30-save shutout in the championship match that gave the River Hawks Hockey East's automatic bid into the 2014 NCAA Division I Men's Ice Hockey Tournament.

The tournament is the 30th in league history, as the conference entered its 30th year of existence. It was also the first tournament since 2004 that neither Boston College nor Boston University advanced to at least the semifinals, played at the TD Garden.

== Format ==
With the addition of Notre Dame to Hockey East, the tournament was reformatted to include all eleven teams in the conference. With eleven being an uneven number, an unorthodox format was needed to achieve a tournament that allowed all eleven teams to participate. A fourth, Opening Round was added before the traditional Quarterfinals, which consists of single-elimination games between the 6-11 seeds hosted by the higher seed, with the 1-5 seeds earning a bye to the next round. The 4 and 5 seeds are guaranteed to play each other whereas the 1-3 seeds will play the winners of the 6-11 seed games, with the highest seeds hosting the lowest seeds remaining. The Quarterfinals through Finals are unchanged from the previous season, with the Quarterfinals consisting of a best-of-three series hosted by the higher seeds, while the Semifinals and Final are single games played at the TD Garden. The tournament champion will receive an automatic bid to the NCAA Tournament.

This tournament format will only be used for the 2013-14 season, as the addition of the UConn Huskies to the conference in the 2014–15 season will bring the total number of teams in the league up to twelve, which allows for a more even, 12-team tournament format. The tournament format following this year will change to a best-of-three Opening Round between 5-11 seeds, with 1-4 seeds earning a bye. The Quarterfinals through Finals will be unchanged.

=== Regular season standings ===
Note: GP = Games played; W = Wins; L = Losses; T = Ties; PTS = Points; GF = Goals For; GA = Goals Against

2013–14 Hockey East men's standings
	Conference record							Overall record					
	GP	W	L	T	PTS	GF	GA	GP	W	L	T	GF	GA
#3 Boston College^{†}	20	16	2	2	34	75	40	40	28	8	4	164	94
#5 Massachusetts–Lowell*	20	11	6	3	25	54	43	41	26	11	4	116	77
#10 Providence	20	11	7	2	24	50	49	39	22	11	6	115	88
#18 New Hampshire	20	11	9	0	22	64	51	41	22	18	1	126	106
#19 Northeastern	20	10	8	2	22	52	51	37	19	14	4	117	103
Maine	20	9	8	3	21	59	48	35	16	15	4	102	83
#14 Vermont	20	10	10	0	20	49	48	38	20	15	3	105	89
#9 Notre Dame	20	9	9	2	20	43	40	40	23	15	2	120	86
Boston University	20	5	12	3	13	43	66	35	10	21	4	81	113
Massachusetts	20	4	13	3	11	42	61	34	8	22	4	76	106
Merrimack	20	3	15	2	8	32	66	33	8	22	3	62	97
Championship: Massachusetts–Lowell † indicates conference regular season champion; * indicates conference tournament champion Rankings: USCHO.com Top 20 Poll; updated March 23, 2014

== Bracket ==
Opening Round; March 7–8
6	Maine	2
11	Merrimack	0
7	Vermont	2
10	Massachusetts	1
8	Notre Dame	3
9	Boston University	2

Quarterfinals; March 14–16
1	Boston College	2	4	2
8	Notre Dame	7	2	4
2	Massachusetts–Lowell	3	2	2
7	Vermont	2	3*	1
3	Providence	3	4	—
6	Maine	1	2	—
4	New Hampshire	1	4	5
5	Northeastern	0	5*	4

Semifinals; March 21
2	Massachusetts–Lowell	4
8	Notre Dame	0
3	Providence	1
4	New Hampshire	3

Championship; March 22
2	Massachusetts–Lowell	4
4	New Hampshire	0

* denotes overtime periods

== Results ==
=== Opening Round ===
On March 7–8 the 6-11 seeds will play in single-elimination games to advance to the best-of-three quarterfinals. Games will be hosted by the higher seeded teams.

Results:

March 7, 2014; 7:05 pm	(10) UMass	1 – 2 (0–0, 1–1, 0–1)	(7) Vermont	Gutterson Fieldhouse, Burlington, Vermont; Attendance: 2823

Game reference

Steve Mastalerz
Goalies
Brody Hoffman
Referees:
Tim Benedetto
Dave Hansen
Linesmen:
Matt Riegert
Jeremy Lovett

Power (Iacobellis, Sheary) – 22:40	1 – 0
	1 – 1	37:18 – Paliotta (Fallon, Markison)
	1 – 2	58:53 – Brickley (DeCenzo, White)

8 min
Penalties
4 min
19
Shots
26

March 8, 2014; 7:05 pm	(9) Boston University	2 – 3 (0–1, 1–1, 1–1)	(8) Notre Dame	Compton Family Ice Arena, South Bend, Indiana; Attendance: 5022

Game reference

Matt O'Connor
Goalies
Steven Summerhays
Referees:
Mark Wilkins
Jeff Bunyon
Linesmen:
Marc Sullivan
Jeremy Lewis

	0 – 1	6:28 – Rust (Tynan, Herr)
	0 – 2	29:25 – Costello (Taker, Tynan)
Rodrigues (Baillargeon) – 36:04	1 – 2
	1 – 3	43:07 – Schneider (Johns, Lind)
Baillargeon (Noonan, Oksanen) (PP) – 54:22	2 – 3

6 min
Penalties
8 min
27
Shots
29

March 8, 2014; 7:05 pm	(11) Merrimack	0 – 2 (0–1, 0–0, 0–1)	(6) Maine	Alfond Arena, Orono, Maine; Attendance: 3678

Game reference
Rasmus Tirronen	Goalies	Martin Ouellette	Referees: Cameron Voss; Geoff Miller; Linesmen: Patrick Turcotte; Chris Aughe
0 – 1 / 2:01 – Anthoine (Swavely, Cerretani); 0 – 2 / 59:41 – Shore (Hutton, Renouf) (EN)			Referees: Cameron Voss; Geoff Miller; Linesmen: Patrick Turcotte; Chris Aughe
10 min	Penalties	10 min	Referees: Cameron Voss; Geoff Miller; Linesmen: Patrick Turcotte; Chris Aughe
29	Shots	35	Referees: Cameron Voss; Geoff Miller; Linesmen: Patrick Turcotte; Chris Aughe

=== Quarterfinals ===
==== (1) Boston College vs. (8) Notre Dame ====
March 14	Boston College	2 - 7	Notre Dame	Conte Forum	Recap
(Gilmour, Cangelosi) Ryan Fitzgerald - PP - 17:37		First period	19:51 - Stephen Johns (DiPauli, Tynan)
No scoring		Second period	2:50 - PP - Stephen Johns (Hinostroza, Taker); 12:49 - GW - Mario Lucia (Hinostroza, Wuthrich)
(Gaudreau, Arnold) Patrick Brown - 17:42		Third period	1:08 - Peter Schneider (Fogarty, Johns); 5:35 - Bryan Rust (Tynan, Herr); 12:44 - Thomas Di Pauli (Lind, Schneider); 14:59 - Peter Schneider (Fogarty, Costello)
( 27 saves / 34 shots ) Thatcher Demko / ( 0 saves / 0 shots ) Brian Billett		Goalie stats	Steven Summerhays ( 22 saves / 24 shots )

March 15	Boston College	4 - 2	Notre Dame	Conte Forum	Recap
(Gaudreau, Arnold) Patrick Brown - 10:28 (Hayes, Arnold) Johnny Gaudreau - PP - 17:39		First period	00:39 - Bryan Rust (Ryan, Taker)
No scoring		Second period	No scoring
(Savage, Gaudreau) Kevin Hayes - GW - 05:58 (Hayes, Gilmour) Johnny Gaudreau - 07:29		Third period	16:18 - Vinnie Hinostroza (Lind, Lucia)
( 19 saves / 21 shots ) Thatcher Demko		Goalie stats	Steven Summerhays ( 33 saves / 37 shots )

March 16	Boston College	2 - 4	Notre Dame	Conte Forum	Recap
(Gilmour) Kevin Hayes - 04:43		First period	11:31 - Stephen Johns (Johnson, Hinostroza)
(Arnold, Hayes) Patrick Brown - PP - 08:05		Second period	04:10 - Sam Herr (Rust, Tynan); 19:56 - GW - Bryan Rust (Tynan, Herr)
No scoring		Third period	18:08 - Jeff Costello (Fogarty)
( 19 saves / 23 shots ) Thatcher Demko		Goalie stats	Steven Summerhays ( 30 saves / 32 shots )

Notre Dame wins series 2-1

==== (2) Massachusetts–Lowell vs. (7) Vermont ====
March 14	Massachusetts–Lowell	3 - 2	Vermont	Tsongas Center	Recap
(Campbell, Folin) Scott Wilson - 11:24		First period	05:10 - Brady Shaw (Markison, Paliotta)
No scoring		Second period	03:12 - Brady Shaw (Lenz, Luukko)
(Kamrass, Fallon) Evan Campbell - 11:17 (Wilson, Holmstrom) Adam Chapie - GW - 18:43		Third period	No scoring
( 27 saves / 29 shots ) Connor Hellebuyck		Goalie stats	Brody Hoffman ( 30 saves / 33 shots )

March 15	Massachusetts–Lowell	2 - 3	OT	Vermont	Tsongas Center	Recap
No Scoring		First period		18:53 - PP - Jonathan Turk (Shaw, Hoffman)
(Arnold) Joseph Pendenza - PP - 08:43		Second period		No scoring
(Gambardella) Scott Wilson - 07:37		Third period		05:53 - PP - Brendan Bradley (Paliotta, Hamilton)
No scoring		First overtime period		05:36 - GW - Mario Puskarich (Lenz, Paliotta)
( 22 saves / 25 shots ) Connor Hellebuyck		Goalie stats		Brody Hoffman ( 36 saves / 38 shots )

March 16	Massachusetts–Lowell	2 - 1	Vermont	Tsongas Center	Recap
(Thompson, Suter) Christian Folin - SH - 10:08 (unassisted) A. J. White - GW PP - 15:43		First period	No scoring
No scoring		Second period	17:46 - PP - Jake Fallon (Bruneteau, Shaw)
No scoring		Third period	No scoring
( 30 saves / 31 shots ) Connor Hellebuyck		Goalie stats	Brody Hoffman ( 17 saves / 19 shots )

Massachusetts–Lowell wins series 2-1

==== (3) Providence vs. (6) Maine ====
March 14	Providence	3 - 1	Maine	Schneider Arena	Recap
(Jankowski, Demopoulos) Trevor Mingoia - 06:28 (Tanev, McKenzie) Derek Army - GW - 06:57		First period	No scoring
(Acciari, Gilmour) Mark Jankowski - PP - 14:05		Second period	04:58 - Ben Hutton (Byron, Morgan)
No scoring		Third period	No scoring
( 34 saves / 35 shots ) Jon Gillies		Goalie stats	Martin Ouellette ( 29 saves / 32 shots )

March 15	Providence	4 - 2	Maine	Schneider Arena	Recap
(Shamanski, Luke) Nick Saracino - 11:20 (Mingoia, Shamanski) Nick Saracino - PP - 15:01		First period	03:18 - Ben Hutton (O'Connor, Shore)
(Acciari) Derek Army - GW - 08:31 (Mingoia, Florentino) Ross Mauermann - PP - 15:36		Second period	No scoring
No scoring		Third period	02:45 - Steven Swavely (O'Connor, Shore)
( 36 saves / 38 shots ) Jon Gillies		Goalie stats	Martin Ouellette ( 18 saves / 21 shots ) / Dan Sullivan ( 8 saves / 9 shots )

Providence wins series 2-0

==== (4) New Hampshire vs. (5) Northeastern ====
March 14	New Hampshire	1 - 0	Northeastern	Whittemore Center	Recap
No Scoring		First period	No scoring
No scoring		Second period	No scoring
(Downing, Maller) Tyler Kelleher - GW - 04:49		Third period	No scoring
( 27 saves / 27 shots ) Casey DeSmith		Goalie stats	Clay Wit ( 34 saves / 35 shots )

March 15	New Hampshire	4 - 5	OT	Northeastern	Whittemore Center	Recap
(Agosta) Grayson Downing - 11:35 (Goumas, Willows) Nick Sorkin - 18:27		First period		14:14 - Ryan Belonger (Pimm)
(Speelman, Downing) Tyler Kelleher - 06:02 (unassisted) Justin Agosta - 11:35		Second period		01:43 - PS - Kevin Roy (unassisted); 16:29 - Colton Saucerman (McMurtry); 19:53 - Kevin Roy (Saucerman, Stevens)
No scoring		Third period		No scoring
No scoring		First overtime period		03:39 - Mike Szmatula (Pimm, McMurtry)
( 28 saves / 33 shots ) Casey DeSmith		Goalie stats		Clay Wit ( 31 saves / 35 shots )

March 16	New Hampshire	5 - 4	Northeastern	Whittemore Center	Recap
(Goumas) Nick Sorkin - 03:29 (Pesce) Kevin Goumas - SH - 05:12 (Pesce, Sorkin) Kevin Goumas - 17:13		First period	13:09 - Torin Snydeman (Stevens, Saucerman)
No scoring		Second period	04:28 - PP - Mike Szmatula (Pimm, McMurtry); 14:27 - Mike McMurtry (Pimm, Saucerman)
(Knodel, Sorkin) Kevin Goumas - PP - 04:40 (Willows, Sorkin) Brett Pesce - GW - 13:41		Third period	16:10 - Mike Szmatula (Roy, Saucerman)
( 22 saves / 26 shots ) Casey DeSmith		Goalie stats	Clay Wit ( 21 saves / 26 shots

New Hampshire wins series 2-1

=== Semifinals ===
==== (2) Massachusetts–Lowell vs. (8) Notre Dame ====
March 21	Massachusetts–Lowell	4 - 0	Notre Dame	TD Garden	Recap
(White, Pendenza) Christian Folin - GW - 10:13 (Kamrass) Derek Arnold - 13:54		First period	No scoring
(Wilson, Folin) Evan Campbell - PP - 03:25 (unassisted) Zack Kamrass - PP - 13:21		Second period	No scoring
No scoring		Third period	No scoring
( 35 saves / 35 shots ) Connor Hellebuyck		Goalie stats	Steven Summerhays ( 18 saves / 22 shots )

==== (3) Providence vs. (4) New Hampshire ====
March 21	Providence	1 - 3	New Hampshire	TD Garden	Recap
No Scoring		First period	No scoring
No scoring		Second period	07:05 - SH - Kevin Goumas (Knodel); 13:31 - GW - Justin Agosta (Willows, Gaudreault); 19:59 - Kevin Goumas (Sorkin, Willows)
(Brown) Kevin Rooney - 03:22		Third period	No scoring
( 28 saves / 31 shots ) Jon Gillies		Goalie stats	Casey DeSmith ( 25 saves / 26 shots )

=== Championship ===
==== (2) Massachusetts–Lowell vs. (4) New Hampshire ====
March 22	Massachusetts–Lowell	4 - 0	New Hampshire	TD Garden	Recap
(Pendenza, Folin) A.J. White - GW - 12:12 (Pendenza, White) Josh Holmstrom - 15:28		First period	No scoring
(Wallin) Joe Gambardella - 03:13 (White, Pendenza) Jake Suter - PP - 18:43		Second period	No scoring
No scoring		Third period	No scoring
( 30 saves / 30 shots ) Connor Hellebuyck		Goalie stats	Casey DeSmith ( 26 saves / 30 shots ) / Jeff Wyer ( 5 saves / 5 shots )

== Tournament awards ==
=== All-Tournament Team ===
- F Kevin Goumas (New Hampshire)
- F Joe Pendenza (Massachusetts-Lowell)
- F A. J. White (Massachusetts-Lowell)
- D Christian Folin (Massachusetts-Lowell)
- D Stephen Johns (Notre Dame)
- G Connor Hellebuyck* (Massachusetts-Lowell)

* Tournament MVP(s)

Note: Hellebuyck became the first player in the 30-year history of the conference to win the award twice, let alone consecutively. He also became the first goaltender to record a shutout in two title games (winning in 2013-14 by a score of 4–0 and in 2012-13 by a score of 1–0), again in consecutive title games.
