= Holy War (Boston College–Notre Dame) =

College football rivalry

- Boston College Eagles Notre Dame Fighting Irish
- First meeting: September 15, 1975; Notre Dame, 17–3
- Latest meeting: November 14, 2026; Notre Dame, 41–7
- Next meeting: 2028 in South Bend
- Stadiums: Alumni Stadium; Chestnut Hill, Massachusetts, U.S. Notre Dame Stadium; South Bend, Indiana, U.S.
- Trophy: Ireland Trophy; Frank Leahy Memorial Bowl

Statistics
- Total meetings: 29
- All-time series: Notre Dame leads, 19–9 (.679)
- Largest victory: Notre Dame, 54–7 (1992)
- Longest win streak: Notre Dame, 11 (2009–present)
- Current win streak: Notre Dame, 11 (2009–present)

Locations of Boston College and Notre Dame

The Frank Leahy Memorial Bowl, more commonly known as the Holy War, is an American rivalry between the Boston College Eagles and University of Notre Dame Fighting Irish, a technical nonconference rivalry in college football, but in most sports an Atlantic Coast Conference rivalry. The series derives its name from the fact that the Eagles and the Fighting Irish represent the only two Catholic universities in the United States which still compete in the Football Bowl Subdivision of the National Collegiate Athletic Association, the highest level of competition in American college football. Boston College and Notre Dame are also the only members of the ACC who sponsor men's ice hockey at the NCAA Division I level and this rivalry is referred to as the "Holy War on Ice".

== Series history ==
Although football at both universities dates to the 19th century, the series itself is relatively young. Boston College and Notre Dame first met on the gridiron on September 15, 1975, in a game held at Foxboro Stadium in Massachusetts. Since then, the two schools have met a total of 25 times, including a match-up in the 1983 Liberty Bowl in Memphis, Tennessee. An annual series was held from 1992 to 2004 and after a two-season hiatus the rivalry resumed for the 2007–12, 2015, 2017, and 2019 seasons as part of Notre Dame's scheduling agreement with the ACC. Notre Dame leads the series 18–9. The future of the series had been in question for several years after Boston College left the Big East for the ACC and the Big East asked Notre Dame to add at least three Big East schools each year to its football schedule, but on June 8, 2010, it was announced that the series would continue.

While the "Holy War" moniker dates to the first contest between the two schools in 1975 and has become popularized in the sports media, the rivalry has also acquired a number of other nicknames over the years. These include the "Vatican Bowl", and the "Frank Leahy Memorial Bowl." Former Secretary of State Condoleezza Rice, a Notre Dame alumna, referenced the rivalry using the "Holy War" moniker during a 2006 commencement address at BC's Alumni Stadium.

== Game results ==
Boston College victories	Notre Dame victories	Vacated wins (Note: Notre Dame's win in 2012 was vacated as a result of NCAA sanctions against the Notre Dame football program issued on November 22, 2016, after the NCAA found that a student-trainer committed academic misconduct for two football players and provided six other players with impermissible academic extra benefits. The NCAA also rejected Notre Dame's appeal on February 13, 2018. This win is not included in Notre Dame's all-time record, nor is it counted in the series record between the two teams. See Wikipedia:WikiProject College football/Vacated victories for an explanation of how vacated victories are recorded.)

No.	Date	Location	Winner	Score
1	September 15, 1975	Foxborough	#9 Notre Dame	17–3
2	December 29, 1983 (Note: 1983 Liberty Bowl)	Memphis	Notre Dame	19–18
3	November 7, 1987	South Bend	#9 Notre Dame	32–25
4	November 7, 1992	South Bend	#8 Notre Dame	54–7
5	November 20, 1993	South Bend	#12 Boston College	41–39
6	October 8, 1994	Chestnut Hill	Boston College	30–11
7	October 28, 1995	South Bend	#15 Notre Dame	20–10
8	November 9, 1996	Chestnut Hill	#19 Notre Dame	48–21
9	October 25, 1997	South Bend	Notre Dame	52–20
10	November 7, 1998	Chestnut Hill	#13 Notre Dame	31–26
11	November 20, 1999	South Bend	#25 Boston College	31–29
12	November 11, 2000	South Bend	#11 Notre Dame	28–16
13	October 27, 2001	Chestnut Hill	Boston College	21–17
14	November 2, 2002	South Bend	Boston College	14–7
15	October 25, 2003	Chestnut Hill	Boston College	27–25
16	October 23, 2004	South Bend	Boston College	24–23

No.	Date	Location	Winner	Score
17	October 13, 2007	South Bend	#4 Boston College	27–14
18	November 8, 2008	Chestnut Hill	Boston College	17–0
19	October 24, 2009	South Bend	Notre Dame	20–16
20	October 2, 2010	Chestnut Hill	Notre Dame	31–13
21	November 19, 2011	South Bend	#24 Notre Dame	16–14
22	November 10, 2012	Chestnut Hill	#4 Notre Dame^{†}	21–6
23	November 21, 2015	Fenway Park	#4 Notre Dame	19–16
24	September 16, 2017	Chestnut Hill	Notre Dame	49–20
25	November 23, 2019	South Bend	#16 Notre Dame	40–7
26	November 14, 2020	Chestnut Hill	#2 Notre Dame	45–31
27	November 19, 2022	South Bend	#18 Notre Dame	44–0
28	November 1, 2025	Chestnut Hill	#12 Notre Dame	25–10
29	November 15, 2026	South Bend	#5 Notre Dame	41–7
Series: Notre Dame leads 19–9
† Vacated by Notre Dame.

== Notable moments ==
Since their first meeting in 1975, the Fighting Irish and Eagles have generated some memorable moments in the past forty plus years. The teams played each season from 1992 until 2004. Over the course of 24 games, some of the more memorable games include:

1983 Liberty Bowl – Notre Dame 19, Boston College 18
Meeting at the 1983 Liberty Bowl in Memphis Notre Dame and the Eagles engaged in a tight and taut contest — a harbinger of subsequent games in the series. Despite Doug Flutie throwing for 287 yards and three touchdowns, BC found itself on the short-end of a 19–18 loss. The Eagles were down 19–12 at halftime and despite a missed extra-point following a Flutie TD pass to Scott Gieselman in the third quarter, BC still had an opportunity to win late in the game. However, on fourth down with 1:08 remaining, a Flutie pass fell incomplete for a Fighting Irish win.

1992 – Notre Dame 54, Boston College 7
In the first game of the revived series, a highly ranked BC team entered the game with high expectations and the goal of reaching a major bowl game. The Fighting Irish ended this hope with a crushing 54–7 victory, still the largest in the series. The game was punctuated—and the rivalry fueled on BC's side – by a successful fake punt called by Notre Dame head coach Lou Holtz, early in the third quarter with his team already ahead 37–0. Also, the crowd scenes from the final game of the 1993 film Rudy were shot during halftime of this game.

1993 – Boston College 41, Notre Dame 39
Boston College held a 38–17 lead with 11:13 left in the game, but Notre Dame fought back. The Stadium rocked as they completed a 22-point comeback. But in the end, David Gordon hit a 41-yard field goal as time expired to drop the Irish to #4 in the rankings and eventually foil their hopes of finishing #1. It was BC's first-ever win over the Fighting Irish. For their effort, the Eagles made the November 29, 1993, Sports Illustrated cover.

1998 – Notre Dame 31, Boston College 26
No. 13 ranked Notre Dame defeated Boston College in a hard-fought battle. Down 31–20 with 9:23 left in the game, Eagles senior quarterback Scott Mutryn threw a 6-yard touchdown pass to Anthony DiCosmo. After a failed two-point conversion, the BC defense prevented a Notre Dame score. The Eagle offense then marched all the way to the Fighting Irish 4-yard line with only seconds remaining on the clock. Running back Mike Cloud was stuffed at the line of scrimmage on the first three downs, and on fourth down Notre Dame safety Deke Cooper tackled Cloud in the backfield to seal a 31–26 victory for the Fighting Irish.

1999 – Boston College 31, Notre Dame 29
The Fighting Irish came into the game in a must-win situation in order to avoid its first bowl-ineligible season since 1986, while the Eagles entered on a three-game winning streak and had its best mark after 9 games since the 1993 campaign. The Eagles came out firing and withstood an early pair of touchdowns by Tony Fisher and Julius Jones, countering with touchdown passes by Tim Hasselbeck as the game was tied at 17 at the break. Hasselbeck would put the Eagles ahead for good with a 1-yard sneak in the third quarter and another touchdown toss early in the fourth. But the Fighting Irish showed no quit with their season on the line, as Jarious Jackson hit Fisher for a nine-yard score. However, a missed extra-point by Jim Sanson proved to be crucial. After Jones' 67-yard punt return for a score, the Fighting Irish were forced to go for the two-point conversation—and failed. The Fighting Irish would get the ball back once more with 2:18 left on the clock, but on the second play of the drive, Jackson's pass was intercepted by Pedro Cirino.

2002 – Boston College 14, Notre Dame 7
BC went to Notre Dame Stadium to face No. 4-ranked Notre Dame, who were clad in their green jerseys for the first time in three years and for the first time at home in 17 seasons, and the team from Chestnut Hill brought back some ghosts of 1993 to Notre Dame. Notre Dame fumbled the ball seven times, losing three, and back-up quarterback Pat Dillingham threw two interceptions. BC walked out with a 14–7 win, its first over a top-5 team since beating the No. 1 Fighting Irish in 1993 on the very same field.

2003 – Boston College 27, Notre Dame 25
Notre Dame and BC staged another dramatic battle in 2003. As usual, the game came down to the final seconds. With the Eagles holding a 24–6 lead, the Fighting Irish fought back. Notre Dame's Nate Schiccatano blocked a BC punt late in the game and Carlos Campbell ran it 25 yards for a touchdown with 3:34 left and a 25–24 Fighting Irish lead. On the ensuing Boston College possession, the Eagles marched down to the Fighting Irish 8-yard line where kicker Sandro Sciortino booted in a chip shot with 38 seconds left and a 27–25 BC win.

2004 – Boston College 24, Notre Dame 23
Trailing 20–7 at halftime, Boston College mounted a comeback led by quarterback Paul Peterson, who threw for 383 yards on the day. With 54 seconds left, Peterson hit Tony Gonzalez for a touchdown and a 24–23 win. A missed extra-point by ND kicker D. J. Fitzpatrick in the first half would account for the difference in the game. It was Notre Dame's fourth straight loss to BC and its fifth in the previous six meetings.

2007 – Boston College 27, Notre Dame 14
Entering the game ranked as the #4 team in the country, the 6–0 Eagles, led by standout Matt Ryan, played virtually flawless football for four quarters. After mounting a 20–0 lead, BC relinquished a pair of touchdowns to make it 20–14. An ineffective Jimmy Clausen had been replaced by Evan Sharpley, which appeared to ignite the Notre Dame offense. BC countered with a touchdown from Ryan to WR Kevin Challenger to solidify the victory. BC would go on to finish 11–3 on the season, while Notre Dame finished 3–9.

2008 – Boston College 17, Notre Dame 0
In 2008 the Fighting Irish made their first trip to Boston in 5 years where The Eagles recorded their first shutout in the series' history. The Eagles 17–0 win was BC's 6th straight against Notre Dame and tied the series record at 9 wins apiece. Fighting Irish quarterback Jimmy Clausen, threw 4 interceptions, including two to safety Paul Anderson (one of which was returned 76 yards for the Eagles' first touchdown of the day). Chris Crane added a TD pass to wideout Ifeanyi Momah to secure a victory. Notre Dame struggled on offense, failing to advance the ball past BC's 22-yard line at any point.

2009 – Notre Dame 20, Boston College 16
Notre Dame notched its first victory against BC since 2000, in a close game that had 5 lead changes. Jimmy Clausen threw for two touchdowns to Golden Tate, the second putting the Fighting Irish ahead for good. Notre Dame intercepted Boston College quarterback Dave Shinskie, with the final interception coming from linebacker Brian Smith with 98 seconds left in the game.

2010 – Notre Dame 31, Boston College 13
Notre Dame got off to a fast start as quarterback Dayne Crist accounted for 3 touchdowns in the first quarter, including passes to Kyle Rudolph and Theo Riddick, before BC could put any points on the board. Notre Dame never looked back after the early lead, earning its second consecutive win in the series. The game was played under the lights in Chestnut Hill, where Boston College's student section emptied by the middle of the third quarter.

2011 – Notre Dame 16, Boston College 14
The #24 ranked Fighting Irish ground out a victory against Boston College in which running back Jonas Gray scored for the eighth consecutive game. The victory in South Bend was part of an 8–5 record in Coach Brian Kelly's second season, while Boston College regressed to 4–8 in the third year under Coach Frank Spaziani. Notre Dame took a 12–9 series lead after the win.

2012 – Notre Dame 21, Boston College 6
The 2012 Holy War saw a further divergence between the fortunes of the Notre Dame and Boston College football programs. #4 Notre Dame rolled over Boston College in Chestnut Hill en route to an undefeated regular season and appearance in the National Championship game. Quarterback Everett Golson ran for a touchdown and threw for two more, while the stout Irish defense held Boston College to two field goals on the day. Boston College finished the season 2-10, and Spaziani was fired. Notre Dame, on the other hand, finished 12-1 and ranked #4 and #3 in the AP and Coaches Polls, respectively.

2015 – Notre Dame 19, Boston College 16
After two seasons off, the rivalry resumed with the first football game played in historic Fenway Park in 47 years. The Fighting Irish entered the game ranked #4, but Boston College's #1 ranked defense kept the game close by securing 5 turnovers. Quarterback DeShone Kizer threw two touchdowns but also three interceptions, in the Irish victory. Notre Dame finished the season 10-3 and ranked #11, while Boston College went 3–9 with only one victory over an FBS opponent.

2017 – Notre Dame 49, Boston College 20
This game in Chestnut Hill began as a close, low-scoring battle. Five minutes into the third quarter, Notre Dame led 14–13. From that point on, however, Notre Dame's rushing attack led by quarterback Brandon Wimbush and running back Josh Adams blasted Boston College for another 35 points. Wimbush and Adams each rushed for over 200 yards, as the team put up 515 rushing yards for its largest total since 1969. Notre Dame won its sixth consecutive game in the series, taking a 15–9 lead over the Eagles.

== Trophies ==
The Frank Leahy Memorial Bowl is a trophy, in the form of a large cut-crystal bowl, given to the winner of the Boston College-Notre Dame football game. It is named after the legendary Frank Leahy, who was the head coach at both schools. The award is presented to the winning team at the conclusion of the game by members of the Notre Dame Club of Boston.

The Ireland Trophy, created by the Notre Dame student government in 1994, is presented annually "as a token of goodwill, camaraderie and friendly rivalry" to the winner of the game.

== Future had been in question ==
After the 2012 season, the Irish became partial member of the ACC, in all sports except football, where they remained independent. Although, as part of the deal to become an associate member in the ACC, the Irish are contracted to five games against ACC opponents every season. With these new obligations, the scheduled 2015–2018 games needed to be amended. BC was originally supposed to host in 2015 at Alumni Stadium, but instead a game was scheduled at Fenway Park, with the Irish hosting the neutral site location in their ongoing Shamrock Series. On October 21, 2014, Notre Dame's future games with ACC schools through 2025 were announced. The Fighting Irish visited Boston College on September 16, 2017; the Eagles returned to Notre Dame on November 23, 2019. The Eagles visited Notre Dame on November 19, 2022. The teams met in 2025 at Boston College with a Notre Dame victory 25–10.

== See also ==
- Holy War on Ice
- List of NCAA college football rivalry games
