= Holy War on Ice =

Boston College–Notre Dame men's ice hockey rivalry

- Boston College Notre Dame
- First meeting: December 20, 1969; Boston College 7, Notre Dame 3
- Latest meeting: November 28, 2025; Boston College 5, Notre Dame 3
- Next meeting: TBD
- Trophy: Lefty Smith – John "Snooks" Kelley Memorial Trophy

Statistics
- Total meetings: 50
- All-time series: Boston College leads 26–22–2
- Largest victory: Notre Dame, 14–3 (1971)
- Longest win streak: Boston College, 4 (1977–1991)
- Longest unbeaten streak: Boston College, 8 (1995–2002)
- Current win streak: Boston College, 2 (2023–present)
- Current unbeaten streak: Boston College, 2 (2023–present)

Locations of Boston College and Notre Dame

The Holy War on Ice refers to the college ice hockey series between Boston College and Notre Dame. Boston College is a member of the Hockey East conference, while Notre Dame is a member of the Big Ten for ice hockey. They are the only members of the Atlantic Coast Conference who sponsor men's ice hockey at the NCAA Division I level. The two teams first met in 1969, predating the football rivalry from which the hockey series gets its name.

The teams play for the Lefty Smith – John "Snooks" Kelley Memorial Trophy.

== History ==
The men's ice hockey series between the two schools originated in 1969, predating the football rivalry. Since Jerry York began his tenure as coach at BC in 1994, the series has been played regularly, receiving the moniker "Holy War on Ice," a reference to the football rivalry.

Boston College leads the all-time series 26–22–2, with the last meeting resulting in a 5–3 Eagles' victory on November 28, 2025, in Boston.

The victor of the game between the Eagles and Irish is awarded the Lefty Smith – John "Snooks" Kelley Memorial Trophy, named for the teams' coaches when the series began in 1969.

In 2008, the two schools met in the 2008 Frozen Four final in Denver, CO, the first time the Eagles and Irish have met in the NCAA Tournament. Boston College skated to a 4–1 victory, claiming their third national championship and denying Notre Dame, a four-seed, the program's first.

Notre Dame briefly joined Boston College in Hockey East from 2013–14 to 2016–17. The two teams met twice annually during those four seasons, and their first contest as conference foes took place outdoors at Frozen Fenway in Boston, MA, where the Eagles skated to a 4–3 victory. They also met once in the postseason during the 2014 Hockey East Tournament. In that series, which was the first year of Notre Dame's league membership, the 8th seeded Irish defeated the top seeded Eagles in a best-of-three Quarterfinals at Chestnut Hill.

While Notre Dame left Hockey East to join the Big Ten in 2017–18, the series continued with at least one game annually.

Despite not meeting during the regular season of 2020–21 due to the COVID-19 pandemic preventing inter-conference games, the two teams seemed destined to meet regardless. The Eagles and Irish were slated to face each other in the first round of the 2021 NCAA tournament, playing in the Northeast regional at the Times Union Center, in Albany, New York. However, before the postseason meeting could happen, Notre Dame was forced to withdraw from the tournament due to positive COVID-19 tests among the team's personnel; the match was ruled a no-contest as the Eagles automatically advanced to the Regional Final.

The series resumed in 2022 after a two-season hiatus caused by the COVID-19 pandemic.

== Game results ==
Boston College victories	Notre Dame victories	Tie games

No.	Date	Location	Winner	Score
1	December 20, 1969	Chestnut Hill, MA	Boston College	7–3
2	December 29, 1969	South Bend, IN	Boston College	7–4
3	December 30, 1970	Chestnut Hill, MA	Notre Dame	5–3
4	December 18, 1971	Chicago, IL	Notre Dame	14–3
5	December 20, 1971	New York, NY	Notre Dame	7–4
6	December 22, 1972	Chestnut Hill, MA	Boston College	11–4
7	December 30, 1973	South Bend, IN	Boston College	4–3
8	December 22, 1974	Chestnut Hill, MA	Notre Dame	7–4
9	December 22, 1975	South Bend, IN	Notre Dame	6–5
10	December 19, 1976	Chestnut Hill, MA	Notre Dame	7–4
11	December 23, 1977	South Bend, IN	Boston College	8–4
12	December 22, 1978	Chestnut Hill, MA	Boston College	10–5
13	January 5, 1989	Chestnut Hill, MA	Boston College	7–5
14	January 4, 1991	Chestnut Hill, MA	Boston College	8–1
15	December 28, 1994	Chestnut Hill, MA	Notre Dame	3–2
16	October 27, 1995	South Bend, IN	Boston College	7–5
17	November 8, 1996	Chestnut Hill, MA	Boston College	6–1
18	October 24, 1997	South Bend, IN	Boston College	3–2
19	November 6, 1998	Chestnut Hill, MA	Tie	5–5
20	October 13, 2000	Omaha, NE	#4 Boston College	4–1
21	November 10, 2000	South Bend, IN	#2 Boston College	5–3
22	October 26, 2001	South Bend, IN	Boston College	4–1
23	November 1, 2002	South Bend, IN	Tie	3–3
24	October 24, 2003	Chestnut Hill, MA	Notre Dame	1–0
25	October 22, 2004	South Bend, IN	Notre Dame	3–2
26	October 20, 2006	Chestnut Hill, MA	Notre Dame	7–1

No.	Date	Location	Winner	Score
27	April 12, 2008	Denver, CO	#7 Boston College	4–1
28	November 7, 2008	Chestnut Hill, MA	#12 Notre Dame	4–1
29	October 23, 2009	South Bend, IN	#14 Boston College	3–2
30	October 23, 2010	South Bend, IN	#17 Notre Dame	2–1
31	November 18, 2011	South Bend, IN	#4 Notre Dame	3–2
32	November 9, 2012	Chestnut Hill, MA	#1 Boston College	3–1
33	January 4, 2014	Boston, MA	#6 Boston College	4–3
34	March 1, 2014	Chestnut Hill, MA	#14 Notre Dame	2–1
35	March 14, 2014	Chestnut Hill, MA	#11 Notre Dame	7–2
36	March 15, 2014	Chestnut Hill, MA	#2 Boston College	4–2
37	March 16, 2014	Chestnut Hill, MA	#11 Notre Dame	4–2
38	February 27, 2015	South Bend, IN	#9 Boston College	2–0
39	February 28, 2015	South Bend, IN	Notre Dame	3–1
40	December 10, 2015	Chestnut Hill, MA	#18 Notre Dame	4–3
41	January 29, 2016	South Bend, IN	#5 Boston College	4–0
42	December 10, 2016	South Bend, IN	#14 Notre Dame	3–2
43	January 28, 2017	Chestnut Hill, MA	#13 Boston College	6–4
44	December 31, 2018	South Bend, IN	#6 Notre Dame	4–0
45	December 6, 2019	Chestnut Hill, MA	#10 Boston College	4–0
46	December 8, 2019	South Bend, IN	#10 Boston College	6–1
47	January 19, 2022	South Bend, IN	#13 Notre Dame	8–2
48	November 25, 2022	Chestnut Hill, MA	#19 Notre Dame	5–2
49	November 24, 2023	South Bend, IN	#2 Boston College	6–1
50	November 28, 2025	Chestnut Hill, MA	#22 Boston College	5–3
Series: Boston College leads 26–22–2

== Series facts ==
Statistic	BC	ND
Games played	50	
Wins	26	22
Home wins	11	8
Road wins	12	12
Neutral site wins	3	2
Most goals scored in a game by one team	11 ('72)	14 ('71)
Most goals in a game by both teams	17 (1971 – ND 14, BC 3)	
Fewest goals in a game by both teams	1 (2003 – ND 1, BC 0)	
Fewest goals scored in a game by one team in a win	2 ('15)	1 ('03)
Most goals scored in a game by one team in a loss	5 ('75)	5 ('78, '89, '95)
Largest margin of victory	7 ('72, '91)	11 ('71)
Smallest margin of victory	1 ('73, '97, '09, '14)	1 ('75, '94, '03, '04, '10, '11, '14, '16)
Longest winning streak	4 ('77–'91)	3 ('70–'71, '74–'76, '03–'06)
Longest unbeaten streak	8 ('95–'02)	4 ('02–'06)

== See also ==
- Holy War (Boston College–Notre Dame)
- Boston College Eagles men's ice hockey
- Notre Dame Fighting Irish men's ice hockey
