= Christian Folin =

Swedish ice hockey player (born 1991)

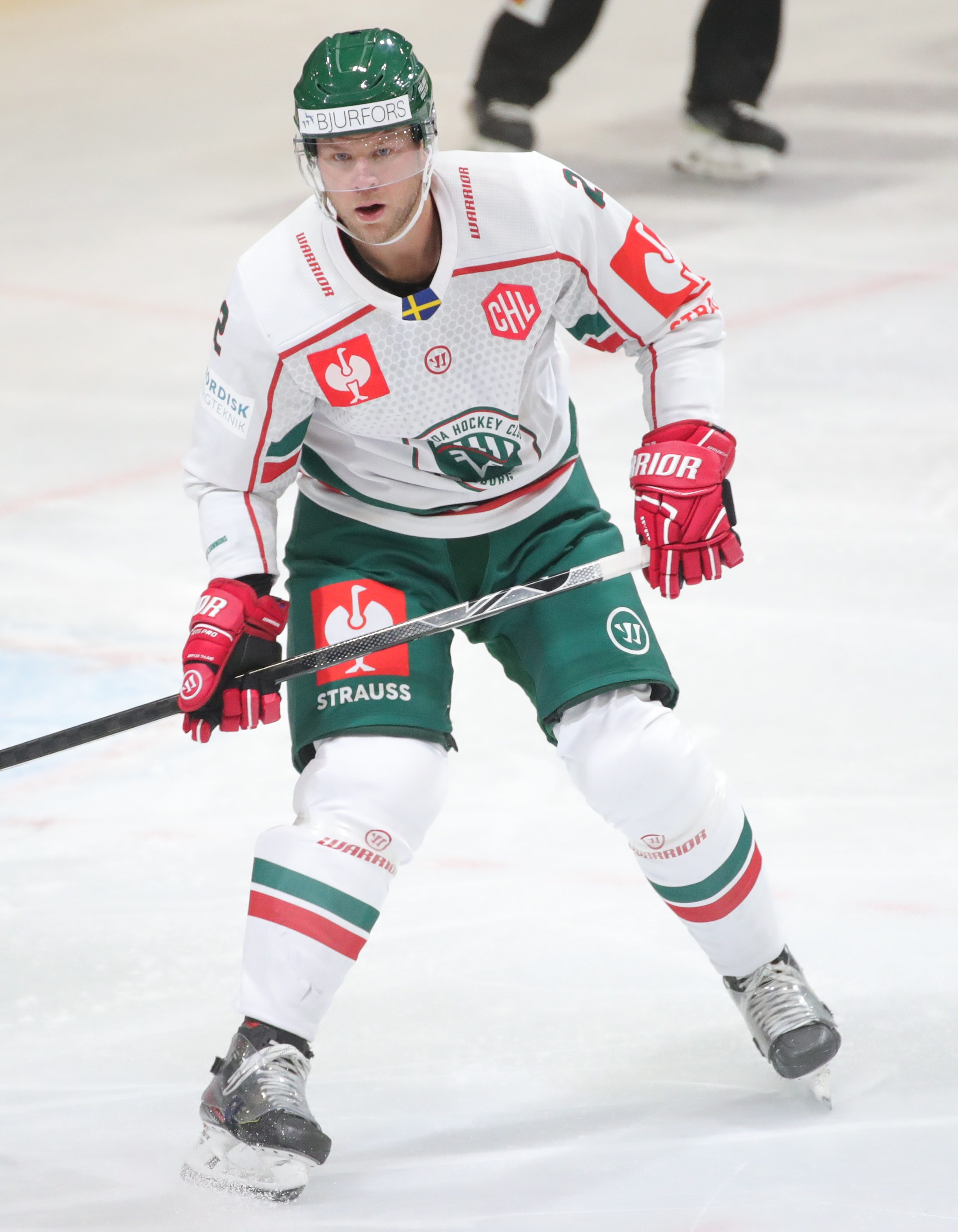
- Folin with Frölunda HC in 2022
- Born: 9 February 1991 (age 35) Kungsbacka, Sweden
- Height: 6 ft 3 in (191 cm)
- Weight: 204 lb (93 kg; 14 st 8 lb)
- Position: Defence
- Shoots: Right
- SHL team Former teams: Frölunda HC; Minnesota Wild; Los Angeles Kings; Philadelphia Flyers; Montreal Canadiens; Växjö Lakers
- National team: Sweden
- NHL draft: Undrafted
- Playing career: 2014–present

Carl Christian Folin (born 9 February 1991) is a Swedish professional ice hockey defenceman for Frölunda HC of the Swedish Hockey League (SHL). Originally undrafted by teams in the National Hockey League (NHL), Folin has previously played for the Minnesota Wild, Los Angeles Kings, Philadelphia Flyers, and Montreal Canadiens.

== Playing career ==
Folin scored six goals and 14 assists in 41 games during the 2013–14 season with the UMass Lowell River Hawks.

On 1 April 2014, the Minnesota Wild of the National Hockey League (NHL) signed Folin as an undrafted free agent to a two-year, entry-level contract. He made his NHL debut on 10 April 2014, notching an assist for the Wild in a 4–2 win over the St. Louis Blues.

On 1 July 2017, Folin left the Wild as a free agent, opting to sign a one-year, $850,000 contract with the Los Angeles Kings. In the 2017–18 season, Folin played on the blueline in a third pairing role with the Kings. He notched a season-best of 3 goals and 13 points in 65 games.

On 5 July 2018, Folin signed as a free agent to a one-year, $800,000 contract with the Philadelphia Flyers. Opening the 2018–19 season on the Flyers roster, Folin continued to play in a bottom pairing role appearing in 26 games with Philadelphia, recording two assists, before he was traded with Dale Weise to the Montreal Canadiens in exchange for David Schlemko and Byron Froese on 10 February 2019. On 18 April, he signed a one-year contract extension with the Canadiens. Folin was waived by the Canadiens on 5 January 2020 and was reassigned to the Laval Rocket. Upon his recall to the Canadiens on 4 February 2020, Folin scored a goal in a 5-4 shootout victory.

As a free agent after seven years in the NHL, Folin opted to return to his native Sweden after securing a contract for the remainder of the 2020–21 season with the Växjö Lakers of the SHL on 30 December 2020.

== Career statistics ==
=== Regular season and playoffs ===
			Regular season					Playoffs
Season	Team	League	GP	G	A	Pts	PIM	GP	G	A	Pts	PIM
2007–08	Frölunda HC	J18	15	0	6	6	6	—	—	—	—	—
2007–08	Frölunda HC	J18 Allsv	13	3	4	7	4	5	0	0	0	2
2008–09	Frölunda HC	J18	14	3	13	16	37	—	—	—	—	—
2008–09	Frölunda HC	J18 Allsv	13	3	4	7	18	7	1	3	4	6
2008–09	Frölunda HC	J20	13	2	1	3	4	4	0	0	0	2
2009–10	Frölunda HC	J20	38	3	16	19	22	5	0	3	3	20
2009–10	Hanhals IF	SWE.4	1	1	1	2	0	—	—	—	—	—
2010–11	Fargo Force	USHL	12	2	2	4	6	—	—	—	—	—
2010–11	Austin Bruins	NAHL	33	2	9	11	27	—	—	—	—	—
2011–12	Austin Bruins	NAHL	54	11	20	31	50	—	—	—	—	—
2012–13	University of Massachusetts Lowell	HE	38	6	15	21	24	—	—	—	—	—
2013–14	University of Massachusetts Lowell	HE	41	6	14	20	31	—	—	—	—	—
2013–14	Minnesota Wild	NHL	1	0	1	1	0	—	—	—	—	—
2014–15	Minnesota Wild	NHL	40	2	8	10	13	—	—	—	—	—
2014–15	Iowa Wild	AHL	13	2	2	4	4	—	—	—	—	—
2015–16	Minnesota Wild	NHL	26	0	4	4	11	—	—	—	—	—
2015–16	Iowa Wild	AHL	28	4	9	13	8	—	—	—	—	—
2016–17	Minnesota Wild	NHL	51	2	6	8	26	2	0	0	0	2
2017–18	Los Angeles Kings	NHL	65	3	10	13	30	4	0	0	0	0
2018–19	Philadelphia Flyers	NHL	26	0	2	2	16	—	—	—	—	—
2018–19	Montreal Canadiens	NHL	19	0	4	4	11	—	—	—	—	—
2019–20	Montreal Canadiens	NHL	16	1	1	2	13	—	—	—	—	—
2019–20	Laval Rocket	AHL	15	1	3	4	2	—	—	—	—	—
2020–21	Växjö Lakers	SHL	17	1	3	4	6	14	1	6	7	6
2021–22	Frölunda HC	SHL	47	5	10	15	49	9	0	1	1	0
2022–23	Frölunda HC	SHL	37	0	7	7	6	13	0	2	2	27
2023–24	Frölunda HC	SHL	52	4	11	15	12	14	1	2	3	28
2024–25	Frölunda HC	SHL	52	6	9	15	23	12	0	0	0	2
2025–26	Frölunda HC	SHL	43	1	4	5	14	6	0	1	1	4
NHL totals			244	8	36	44	120	6	0	0	0	2
SHL totals			248	17	44	61	110	68	2	12	14	67

=== International ===
Year	Team	Event	Result	GP	G	A	Pts	PIM
2022	Sweden	OG	4th	6	0	0	0	2
2023	Sweden	WC	6th	1	0	0	0	0
Senior totals				7	0	0	0	2

== Awards and honors ==
Award	Year
College
HE All-Tournament Team	2014
SHL
Le Mat Trophy (Växjö Lakers)	2021
