= Ryan Fitzgerald (ice hockey) =

American ice hockey player (born 1994)

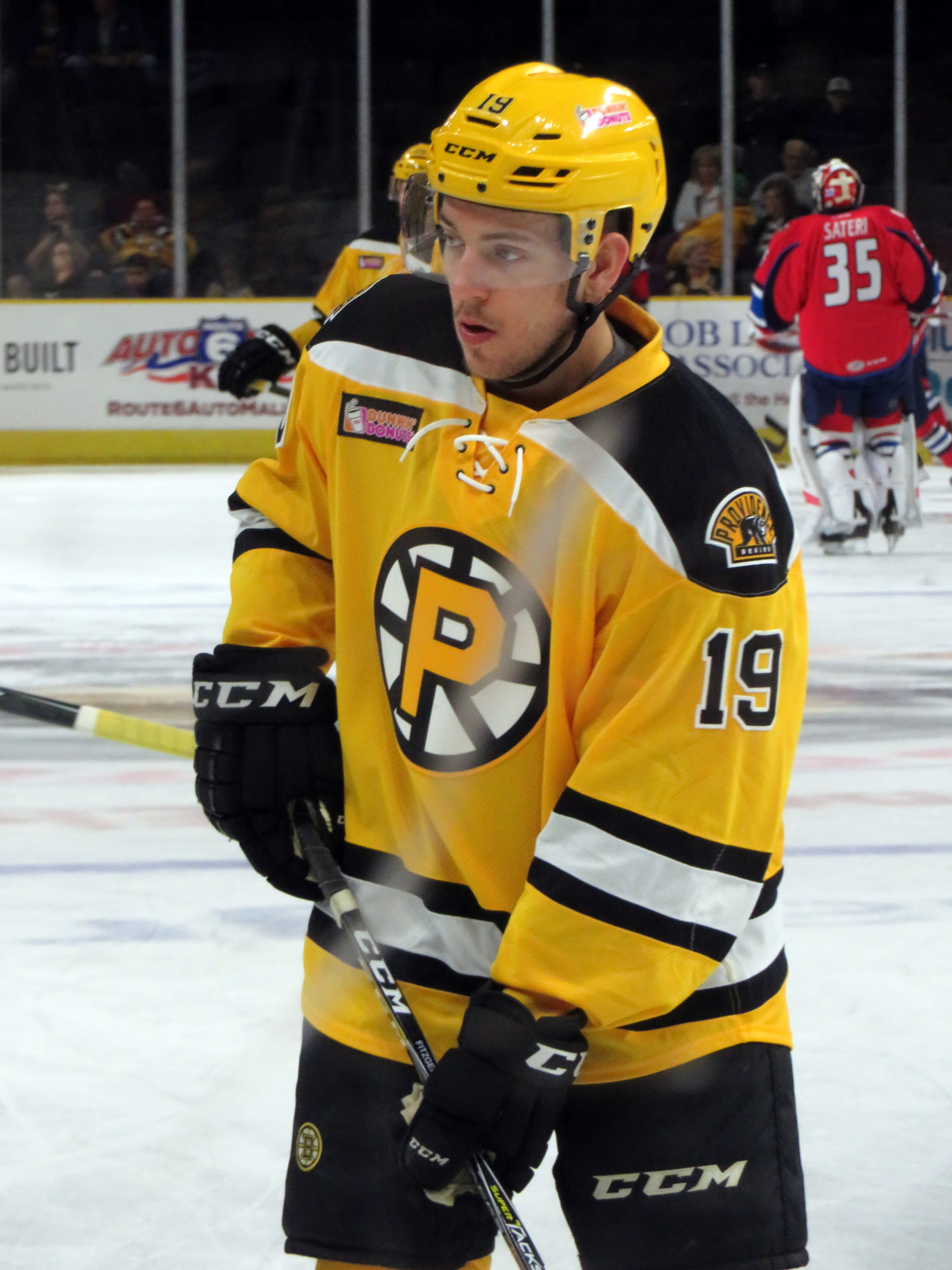
- Fitzgerald with the Providence Bruins in 2017
- Born: October 19, 1994 (age 31) Boca Raton, Florida, U.S.
- Height: 5 ft 11 in (180 cm)
- Weight: 185 lb (84 kg; 13 st 3 lb)
- Position: Forward
- Shoots: Left
- AHL team Former teams: Free agent Providence Bruins; Lehigh Valley Phantoms; Utica Comets
- NHL draft: 120th overall, 2013; Boston Bruins
- Playing career: 2017–present

Ryan Thomas Fitzgerald (born October 19, 1994) is an American professional ice hockey player who is a forward. He most recently played for the Utica Comets of the American Hockey League (AHL). He was selected by the Boston Bruins with the last pick in the 4th round (120th overall) of the 2013 NHL entry draft.

== Early life ==
Fitzgerald was born in Boca Raton, Florida, when his father Tom was a member of the Florida Panthers. As a result of his father's career, he grew up in Florida and Tennessee, before his family settled in North Reading, Massachusetts.

== Playing career ==
=== Amateur ===
Fitzgerald played for Malden Catholic High School of MIAA Catholic Conference and the Valley Jr. Warriors of the Eastern Junior Hockey League before committing to play for Boston College Eagles in the Hockey East conference of the NCAA. He was the 2012 MVP of the CCM/USA Hockey All-American Prospects Game.

=== Collegiate ===
Fitzgerald joined the Eagles in the 2013-14 season and made an impact immediately as a rookie, being named the conference's rookie of the month for November, in just his second month of collegiate play. Playing alongside Hobey Baker winner Johnny Gaudreau, Fitzgerald finished the season fifth on the team in scoring with 29 points as the Eagles made a deep NCAA tournament run, coming up just short of the title game after falling to eventual champions Union in the Frozen Four.

Fitzgerald's sophomore campaign was consistent, as he led the team in goals scored (17) and finished fourth on the team scoring (25), despite an early exit from postseason play.

Fitzgerald's junior year was a breakout year as he led the team in both goals scored (24) and overall scoring (47), helping the team to another deep NCAA tournament run. However, the Eagles would fall short of the championship yet again, after being defeated by the Quinnipiac Bobcats in the Frozen Four. For his efforts during the season, Fitzgerald was named a Hockey East 1st-Team All-Star as well as an NCAA 2nd-Team All-American.

For his senior year, Fitzgerald was named an assistant captain of the Eagles, but dipped in his point production as the Eagles had an off year in terms of postseason success. Fitzgerald scored 12 goals and 31 points on the year as the Eagles reached the Hockey East tournament Championship, but fell to the UMass Lowell River Hawks and failed to qualify for the NCAA tournament. Fitzgerald ended his NCAA career with 66 goals and 132 points.

=== Professional ===
With the completion of his collegiate career, Fitzgerald was signed to a two-year entry-level contract with the Boston Bruins on March 24, 2017. He immediately joined AHL affiliate, the Providence Bruins, on an amateur try-out basis to play out the remaining 2016–17 season.

After parts of four seasons within the Bruins organization, playing exclusively with AHL affiliate, the Providence Bruins, Fitzgerald left as a free agent. Unable to garner NHL interest, Fitzgerald agreed to a one-year AHL contract with the Lehigh Valley Phantoms, affiliate to the Philadelphia Flyers, for the 2020–21 season on January 18, 2021. In the shortened AHL season with the Phantoms, Fitzgerald increased his scoring output, registering 12 goals and 21 points through only 27 regular season games.

As a free agent, Fitzgerald opted to continue within the Flyers organization, securing a one-year, two-way NHL contract with Philadelphia on July 28, 2021.

On August 16, 2022, Fitzgerald continued his tenure with the Phantoms, signing a one-year AHL contract as a free agent.

On July 7, 2023, Fitzgerald signed with the Utica Comets.

== Personal life ==
Fitzgerald's father is Tom Fitzgerald, a former player in the NHL and the current general manager of the New Jersey Devils. His younger brother, Casey, is a defenseman for the Florida Panthers and played with Ryan when they both attended Boston College. He is also cousins with former Eagles and NHL player Kevin Hayes, along with his late brother Jimmy Hayes as well as NHL players Brady, Matthew and Keith Tkachuk.

== Career statistics ==
=== Regular season and playoffs ===
			Regular season					Playoffs
Season	Team	League	GP	G	A	Pts	PIM	GP	G	A	Pts	PIM
2009–10	Malden Catholic High	USHS	24	17	30	47	10	—	—	—	—	—
2010–11	Malden Catholic High	USHS	24	28	44	72	28	—	—	—	—	—
2011–12	Malden Catholic High	USHS	19	31	20	51	12	—	—	—	—	—
2012–13	Valley Jr. Warriors	EJHL	26	14	16	30	50	6	3	3	6	8
2012–13	U.S. National Development Team	USDP	5	1	0	1	8	—	—	—	—	—
2013–14	Boston College	HE	40	13	16	29	22	—	—	—	—	—
2014–15	Boston College	HE	38	17	8	25	54	—	—	—	—	—
2015–16	Boston College	HE	40	24	23	47	47	—	—	—	—	—
2016–17	Boston College	HE	34	12	19	31	56	—	—	—	—	—
2016–17	Providence Bruins	AHL	8	0	2	2	2	13	1	4	5	6
2017–18	Providence Bruins	AHL	65	21	16	37	45	3	2	0	2	4
2018–19	Providence Bruins	AHL	61	9	28	37	26	4	0	1	1	0
2019–20	Providence Bruins	AHL	61	13	14	27	18	—	—	—	—	—
2020–21	Lehigh Valley Phantoms	AHL	28	12	9	21	8	—	—	—	—	—
2021–22	Lehigh Valley Phantoms	AHL	4	0	0	0	2	—	—	—	—	—
2022–23	Lehigh Valley Phantoms	AHL	13	1	1	2	0	—	—	—	—	—
2023–24	Utica Comets	AHL	22	1	1	2	8	—	—	—	—	—
AHL totals			262	57	71	128	109	20	3	5	8	10

=== International ===
Year	Team	Event	Result	GP	G	A	Pts	PIM
2012	United States	WJAC	1st place, gold medalist(s)	4	4	0	4	22
Junior totals				4	4	0	4	22

== Awards and honors ==
Award	Year	Ref
EJHL
CCM/USA Hockey All-American Prospects Game MVP	2012	
Rookie of the Year	2013	
College
HE Rookie of the Month (November)	2013	
ACHA Second All-American Team	2016	
HE First All-Star Team	2016	
HE All-Tournament Team	2017	
