= 2013–14 NCAA Division I men's ice hockey rankings =

- NCAA tournament: 2014
- NCAA champion: Union
- Preseason No. 1 (USA Today): UMass Lowell
- Preseason No. 1 (USCHO): UMass Lowell
- NCAA Division I men's ice hockey rankings

Two human polls made up the 2013–14 NCAA Division I men's ice hockey rankings, the USCHO.com/CBS College Sports poll and the USA Today/USA Hockey Magazine poll. As the 2013–14 season progressed, rankings were updated weekly.

== Legend ==
| | Increase in ranking |
| | Decrease in ranking |
| | Not ranked previous week |
| Italics | Number of first place votes |
| (#-#) | Win–loss–tie record |
| т | Tied with team above or below also with this symbol |

== USCHO ==
| | Preseason Sep 30 | Week 2 Oct 14 | Week 3 Oct 21 | Week 4 Oct 28 | Week 5 Nov 4 | Week 6 Nov 11 | Week 7 Nov 18 | Week 8 Nov 25 | Week 9 Dec 2 | Week 10 Dec 9 | Week 11 Dec 16 | Week 12 Dec 30 | Week 13 Jan 6 | Week 14 Jan 13 | Week 15 Jan 20 | Week 16 Jan 27 | Week 17 Feb 3 | Week 18 Feb 10 | Week 19 Feb 17 | Week 20 Feb 24 | Week 21 Mar 3 | Week 22 Mar 10 | Week 23 Mar 17 | Week 24 Mar 24 | Final Apr 14 | |
|---|---|---|---|---|---|---|---|---|---|---|---|---|---|---|---|---|---|---|---|---|---|---|---|---|---|---|
| 1. | UMass Lowell (18) | Miami (2–0–0) (40) | Minnesota (4–0–0) (31) | Minnesota (5–0–1) (50) | Minnesota (5–0–1) (50) | Minnesota (6-1-1) (38) | Minnesota (8-1-1) (47) | Minnesota (9-2-1) (22) | Minnesota (11-2-1) (41) | St. Cloud (11-1-2) (32) | Minnesota (12-2-2) (32) | Minnesota (12–2–2) (37) | Minnesota (13–2–3) (42) | Minnesota (14–2–3) (48) | Minnesota (17–2–3) (50) | Minnesota (18–2–4) (44) | Minnesota (19–2–5) (40) | Boston College (21–4–3) (47) | Boston College (24–4–3) (49) | Boston College (25–4–4) (49) | Minnesota (23–4–5) (37) | Minnesota (24–4–6) (29) | Minnesota (25–5–6) (36) | Union (28–6–4) (31) | Union (32–6–4) (50) | 1. |
| 2. | Miami (Ohio) (14) | Wisconsin (2–0–0) (5) | Notre Dame (4–0–0) (11) | Notre Dame (5–1–0) | Michigan (6–1–1) | Michigan (6-1-1) (9) | St. Cloud (8-1-1) (1) | St. Cloud (9-1-2) (27) | St. Cloud (9-1-2) (8) | Minnesota (12-2-2) (14) | Ferris State (14-2-3) (12) | Ferris State (14–2–3) (9) | St. Cloud (11–2–3) (8) | Ferris State (17–3–3) (1) | Boston College (16–4–3) | Boston College (18–4–3) (6) | Boston College (19–4–3) (10) | Minnesota (19–4–5) (3) | Minnesota (21–4–5) (1) | Minnesota (21–4–5) (1) | Boston College (25–5–4) (12) | Boston College (25–5–4) (19) | Union (26–6–4) (14) | Minnesota (25–6–6) (18) | Minnesota (28–7–6) | 2. |
| 3. | Wisconsin (2) | Minnesota (2–0–0) (2) | Miami (3–1–0) (5) | Providence (4–0–1) | St. Cloud (5–0–1) | St. Cloud (6-1-1) (1) | Providence (9-1-1) | Michigan (8-2-1) | Michigan (9-2-1) | Michigan (10-2-1) | Michigan (10-2-2) | St. Cloud (11–2–3) (1) | Ferris State (15–3–3) | St. Cloud (12–3–3) (1) | Union (15–4–3) | Quinnipiac (18–4–5) | Quinnipiac (19–4–5) | Union (19–6–3) | Union (20–6–4) | Union (22–6–4) | Union (24–6–4) (1) | Union (24–6–4) (1) | Boston College (26–7–4) | Boston College (26–7–4) | Boston College (28–8–4) | 3. |
| 4. | Boston College | Notre Dame (2–0–0) | Michigan (3–0–1) | Michigan (4–1–1) | Notre Dame (6–2–0) | Notre Dame (7-3-0) | Quinnipiac (11-1-1) (2) | Providence (10-2-1) | Providence (11-2-2) | Ferris State (13-2-2) (3) | St. Cloud (11-2-3) (4) | Providence (13–2–3) (3) | Union (12–3–3) | Boston College (14–4–3) | Quinnipiac (18–4–5) | Union (16–5–3) | Union (17–6–3) | Ferris State (20–6–3) т | St. Cloud (17–6–5) | Ferris State (23–7–3) | St. Cloud (19–8–5) | St. Cloud (21–8–5) (1) | Ferris State (27–9–3) | Wisconsin (24–10–2) | North Dakota (25–14–3) | 4. |
| 5. | Minnesota (1) | Michigan (2–0–0) | Boston College (2–1–0) | North Dakota (2–1–1) | Quinnipiac (8–1–0) | Providence (7-1-1) | Michigan (7-2-1) | Quinnipiac (12-2-1) | Quinnipiac (13-2-2) | Providence (11-2-3) | Providence (11-2-3) (2) | Union (12–3–3) | Boston College (13–4–2) | Quinnipiac (17–3–5) | St. Cloud (12–4–4) | St. Cloud (13–5–4) | Ferris State (18–6–3) | Quinnipiac (20–5–5) т | Quinnipiac (21–6–5) | St. Cloud (18–7–5) | Wisconsin (19–9–2) | Wisconsin (21–9–2) | Quinnipiac (24–8–6) | UMass Lowell (25–10–4) (1) | UMass-Lowell (26–11–4) | 5. |
| 6. | Yale (8) | North Dakota (1–0–1) | North Dakota (2–1–1) | Miami (3–2–1) | Providence (5–1–1) | Quinnipiac (9-1-1) (2) | Notre Dame (8-3-1) | Ferris State (10-2-1) (1) | Ferris State (11-2-2) (1) | Boston College (10-4-2) | Union (12-3-3) | Boston College (12–4–2) | Providence (13–3–4) | Union (13–4–3) | Ferris State (17–5–3) | Ferris State (18–6–3) | St. Cloud (14–6–4) | St. Cloud (15–6–5) | Ferris State (21–7–3) | Wisconsin (19–9–2) | Quinnipiac (22–8–6) | Ferris State (25–9–3) т | Wisconsin (22–10–2) | Ferris State (28–10–3) | Ferris State (29–11–3) | 6. |
| 7. | North Dakota | Boston College (1–1–0) т | Yale (0–0–0) (3) | Quinnipiac (6–1–0) | Miami (5–2–1) | Boston College (6-2-1) | Boston College (7-2-2) | Boston College (8-3-2) | UMass Lowell (10-4-0) | Quinnipiac (13-3-3) | Boston College (10-4-2) | Michigan (10–4–2) | Quinnipiac (15–3–4) | Providence (13–5–4) | Providence (14–5–5) | Providence (15–6–5) | UMass Lowell (18–7–2) | UMass Lowell (19–7–3) | UMass Lowell (20–7–3) | UMass Lowell (20–8–4) | Ferris State (23–9–3) | Quinnpiac (22–8–6) т | UMass Lowell (23–10–4) | Quinnipiac (24–9–6) | Wisconsin (24–11–2) | 7. |
| 8. | Notre Dame | Yale (0–0–0) (3) т | Providence (3–0–0) | Boston College (2–2–1) | Boston College (4–2–1) | Miami (6-3-1) | Miami (7-4-1) | UMass Lowell (10-4-0) | Yale (6-2-2) | Clarkson (12-3-1) | Quinnipiac (13-3-3) | Quinnipiac (13–3–4) | Michigan (10–4–2) | Yale (8–3–4) | UMass Lowell (15–6–2) | UMass Lowell (16–7–2) | Providence (15–7–5) | Wisconsin (16–8–2) | Wisconsin (17–9–2) | Quinnipiac (21–8–5) | UMass Lowell (21–9–4) | UMass Lowell (21–9–4) | St. Cloud State (21–10–5) | St. Cloud State (21–10–5) | St. Cloud State (22–11–5) | 8. |
| 9. | St. Cloud | UMass Lowell (1–1–0) | Quinnipiac (3–1–0) | St. Cloud (3–0–1) | Yale (2–1–1) | Yale (3-1-2) | Yale (4-1-2) | Yale (5-2-2) | Boston College (8-4-2) | UMass Lowell (11-5-0) | Clarkson (12-3-1) | UMass Lowell (13–5–0) | UMass Lowell (14–5–1) | Wisconsin (13–6–1) | Wisconsin (13–6–1) | Wisconsin (14–7–1) | Cornell (12–4–5) | Providence (15–7–5) | Northeastern (17–10–3) | Northeastern (18–10–4) | North Dakota (19–10–3) | Providence (19–9–6) | Providence (21–9–6) | Notre Dame (23–14–2) | Quinnipiac (24–10–6) | 9. |
| 10. | Quinnipiac (1) | Providence (2–0–0) | St. Cloud (1–0–1) | RPI (4–1–) | RPI (5–2–1) | RPI (6-2-2) | Ferris State (8-2-1) | Clarkson (10-3-1) | Clarkson (10-3-1) | Union (10-3-2) | UMass Lowell (11-5-0) | Yale (7–3–3) | Yale (7–3–4) | UMass Lowell (14–6–1) | Yale (9–4–4) | Northeastern (15–8–3) | Michigan (13–6–3) | Michigan (14–7–3) | Michigan (14–9–3) | North Dakota (18–9–3) | Providence (19–9–6) | North Dakota (20–11–3) | Notre Dame (22–13–2) | Providence (21–10–6) | Providence (22–11–6) | 10. |
| 11. | Michigan т | St. Cloud (1–0–1) | Wisconsin (2–2–0) | Yale (1–1–0) | North Dakota (2–3–1) | Clarkson (9-2-1) | Clarkson (10-3-1) | Notre Dame (8-5-1) | Union (8-3-2) | Yale (6-3-3) | Yale (6-3-3) | Clarkson (12–5–1) | Clarkson (12–6–2) | Northeastern (13–6–3) | Northeastern (14–7–3) | Cornell (10–4–2) | Northeastern (15–8–3) | Cornell (12–5–5) | North Dakota (16–9–3) | Cornell (14–7–5) | Notre Dame (20–12–2) | Notre Dame (21–12–2) | North Dakota (22–12–3) | Minnesota State (26–13–1) | Notre Dame (23–15–2) | 11. |
| 12. | Minnesota State т | Denver (2–0–0) | RPI (3–1–0) | Lake Superior (4–0–0) | UMass Lowell (5–3–0) | Wisconsin (3-2-1) | Wisconsin (4-3-1) | Wisconsin (4-3-1) | Miami (8-6-2) | Miami (9-7-2) | Miami (9-7-2) | Miami (9–7–2) | Cornell (8–4–3) | Cornell (8–4–3) | Cornell (9–4–4) | Michigan (12–6–2) | Wisconsin (14–8–2) | Northeastern (16–9–3) | Providence (15–9–6) | Providence (17–9–6) | Michigan (16–10–4) | Cornell (15–8–5) | Michigan (18–12–4) | Colgate (20–13–5) | Minnesota State (26–14–1) | 12. |
| 13. | New Hampshire | New Hampshire (1–1–0) | Boston University (3–1–0) | Wisconsin (2–2–0) | Wisconsin (3–2–1) | North Dakota (3-4-1) | UMass Lowell (8-4-0) | Miami (7-6-1) | Notre Dame (9-6-1) | Notre Dame (10-7-1) | Notre Dame (10-7-1) | Wisconsin (10–5–1) | Miami (9–7–2) | Michigan (10–6–2) | Clarkson (15–7–2) | Yale (10–5–4) | Yale (11–6–4) | Yale (12–7–4) | Cornell (12–7–5) | Michigan (15–10–3) | Cornell (15–8–5) | Michigan (17–11–4) | Cornell (17–9–5) | North Dakota (23–13–3) | Colgate (20–14–5) | 13. |
| 14. | Providence | Quinnipiac (1–1–0) | New Hampshire (1–2–1) | Cornell (2–0–0) | Lake Superior (4–1–1) | Ferris State (7-2-0) | RPI (6-4-2) | Cornell (6-3-1) | Lake Superior (9-4-1) | Cornell (7-4-2) | Wisconsin (8-5-1) | Notre Dame (10–7–1) | Wisconsin (11–6–1) | Clarkson (13–7–2) | Michigan (10–6–2) | Notre Dame (15–9–1) | Clarkson (15–10–2) | Clarkson (17–11–2) | Yale (13–8–4) | Notre Dame (19–12–2) | Northeastern (18–12–4) | Northeastern (18–12–4) | Colgate (19–12–5) | Vermont (20–14–3) | Vermont (20–15–3) | 14. |
| 15. | RPI | Boston University (2–0–0) | Lake Superior (4–0–0) | UMass Lowell (3–3–0) | Cornell (3–1–0) | Lake Superior (4-2-1) | North Dakota (4-5-1) | Union (6-3-2) | Cornell (7-5-1) | Wisconsin (6-5-1) | Cornell (7-4-2) | Cornell (8–4–3) | Notre Dame (10–8–1) | Notre Dame (12–8–1) | Notre Dame (14–8–1) | Clarkson (15–9–2) | Denver (13–8–5) | Vermont (15–9–3) | Notre Dame (17–12–2) | Yale (14–8–5) | Vermont (18–12–3) | Vermont (19–12–3) | Minnesota State (24–13–1) | Michigan (18–13–4) | Cornell (17–10–5) | 15. |
| 16. | Union | Union (1–0–1) | Minnesota State (2–2–0) | Minnesota State (2–2–0) | Clarkson (7–2–1) | UMass Lowell (5-4-0) | Lake Superior (6-3-1) | Lake Superior (7-4-1) | Nebraska-Omaha (8-6-0) | Northeastern (9-5-2) | Northeastern (9-5-2) | Denver (10–6–3) | Northeastern (11–6–3) | Denver (11–7–4) | Denver (12–7–2) | Denver (13–8–5) | North Dakota (13–8–3) | Minnesota-Duluth (13–9–4) | Vermont (15–11–3) | Colgate (16–11–5) | Yale (15–9–5) | Yale (17–9–5) | Vermont (20–14–3) | Cornell (17–10–5) | Michigan (18–13–4) | 16. |
| 17. | Denver | RPI (1–1–0) | Denver (2–2–0) | Clarkson (6–1–1) | Boston University (4–4–0) | St. Lawrence (6-2-2) | Union (6-3-2) | Nebraska-Omaha (7-6-0) | Wisconsin (4-5-1) | Lake Superior (9-6-1) | Denver (9-6-3) | Northeastern (10–6–2) | Denver (10–6–4) | New Hampshire (13–10–1) | Vermont (12–8–3) | North Dakota (13–8–3) | Minnesota-Duluth (12–9–3) | North Dakota (14–9–3) | Maine (15–10–3) | Vermont (17–11–3) | Minnesota State (21–13–0) | Colgate (17–12–5) | Northeastern (19–14–4) | Denver (20–15–6) | Denver (20–16–6) | 17. |
| 18. | Western Michigan | Minnesota State (0–2–0) | UMass Lowell (1–3–0) | Boston University (3–3–0) | Minnesota State (3–3–0) | Northeastern (6-3-0) | Cornell (4-3-1) | Minnesota-Duluth (6-5-1) | New Hampshire (9-7-1) | RPI (8-5-3) | Lake Superior (10-7-1) | Lake Superior (10–7–1) | Vermont (10–6–3) | Vermont (11–7–3) | North Dakota (12–7–3) | Colgate (13–9–3) | Notre Dame (15–11–1) | Denver (13–9–6) | Denver (14–10–6) | Maine (15–11–4) | Colgate (17–12–5) | Minnesota State (22–13–1) | New Hampshire (21–17–1) | New Hampshire (22–18–1) | New Hampshire (22–18–1) | 18. |
| 19. | Boston University | Cornell (0–0–0) | Cornell (0–0–0) | Northeastern (5–1–0) | Ferris State (5–2–1) | Cornell (3-2-1) | Minnesota-Duluth (5-4-1) | RPI (7-5-2) | Northeastern (9-5-1) | Nebraska-Omaha (8-7-1) | Nebraska-Omaha (8-7-1) | Nebraska-Omaha (8–7–1) | Lake Superior (11–8–1) | Maine (11–7–2) | Western Michigan (12–8–4) | Vermont (13–9–3) | Vermont (13–9–3) | Colgate (14–11–3) | Colgate (14–11–5) | Minnesota State (19–13–0) | Minnesota-Duluth (15–13–4) | Maine (16–13–4) | Western Michigan (19–14–5) | Northeastern (19–14–4) | Northeastern (19–14–4) | 19. |
| 20. | Niagara | Minnesota-Duluth (1–0–1) | Northeastern (4–0–0) | Minnesota-Duluth (3–2–1) | Minnesota-Duluth (4–3–1) | Minnesota-Duluth (4-3-1) | New Hampshire (6-5-1) | New Hampshire (7-6-1) | Minnesota-Duluth (6-5-1) | Denver (8-6-2) | Minnesota State (11-7-0) | Vermont (10–6–1) | New Hampshire (11–10–1) | North Dakota (11–7–2) | Maine (11–8–3) | Western Michigan (12–8–4) | New Hampshire (16–13–1) | Notre Dame (16–12–1) | Minnesota-Duluth (13–11–4) | Denver (14–12–6) | Maine (15–13–4) | Minnesota-Duluth (16–14–4) | Yale (17–11–5) | Ohio State (18–14–5) | Ohio State (18–14–5) | 20. |
| | Preseason Sep 30 | Week 2 Oct 14 | Week 3 Oct 21 | Week 4 Oct 28 | Week 5 Nov 4 | Week 6 Nov 11 | Week 7 Nov 18 | Week 8 Nov 25 | Week 9 Dec 2 | Week 10 Dec 9 | Week 11 Dec 16 | Week 12 Dec 30 | Week 13 Jan 6 | Week 14 Jan 13 | Week 15 Jan 20 | Week 16 Jan 27 | Week 17 Feb 3 | Week 18 Feb 10 | Week 19 Feb 17 | Week 20 Feb 24 | Week 21 Mar 3 | Week 22 Mar 10 | Week 23 Mar 17 | Week 24 Mar 24 | Final Apr 14 | |
| | | Dropped: Niagara; Western Michigan | Dropped: Minnesota-Duluth; Union | Dropped: New Hampshire; Denver | Dropped: Northeastern | Dropped: Minnesota State; Boston University | Dropped: St. Lawrence; Northeastern | Dropped: North Dakota | Dropped: RPI | Dropped: New Hampshire; Minnesota-Duluth | Dropped: RPI | Dropped: Minnesota State | Dropped: Nebraska-Omaha | Dropped: Miami; Lake Superior | Dropped: New Hampshire | Dropped: Maine | Dropped: Western Michigan; Colgate | Dropped: New Hampshire | Dropped: Clarkson | Dropped: Minnesota-Duluth | Dropped: Denver | None | Dropped: Maine; Minnesota-Duluth | Dropped: Western Michigan; Yale | None | |

== USA Today ==
| | Preseason Sep 23 | Week 1 Oct 7 | Week 2 Oct 14 | Week 3 Oct 21 | Week 4 Oct 28 4 | Week 5 Nov 4 | Week 6 Nov 11 | Week 7 Nov 18 | Week 8 Nov 25 | Week 9 Dec 2 | Week 10 Dec 9 | Week 11 Dec 16 | Week 13 Jan 6 | Week 14 Jan 13 | Week 15 Jan 20 | Week 16 Jan 27 | Week 17 Feb 3 | Week 18 Feb 10 | Week 19 Feb 17 | Week 20 Feb 24 | Week 21 Mar 3 | Week 22 Mar 10 | Week 23 Mar 17 | Week 24 Mar 24 | Final Apr 14 | |
|---|---|---|---|---|---|---|---|---|---|---|---|---|---|---|---|---|---|---|---|---|---|---|---|---|---|---|
| 1. | UMass Lowell (20) | UMass Lowell (0–0–0) (13) | Miami (2–0–0) (28) | Minnesota (4–0–0) (25) | Minnesota (5–0–1) (34) | Minnesota (5-0-1) (34) | Minnesota (6-1-1) (26) | Minnesota (8-1-1) (32) | Minnesota (9-2-1) (21) | Minnesota (11-2-1) (31) | Minnesota (12-2-2) (16) | Minnesota (12–2–2) (28) | Minnesota (13–2–3) (34) | Minnesota (14–2–3) (33) | Minnesota (17–2–3) (34) | Minnesota (18–2–4) (32) | Minnesota (19–2–5) (27) | Boston College (21–4–3) (33) | Boston College (24–4–3) (33) | Boston College (25–4–4) (33) | Minnesota (23–4–5) (27) | Minnesota (24–4–6) (30) | Minnesota (25–5–4) (27) | Minnesota (25–6–6) (15) | Union (32–6–4) (34) | 1. |
| 2. | Miami (Ohio) (9) | Miami (0–0–0) (16) | Wisconsin (2–0–0) (3) | Notre Dame (4–0–0) (5) | Notre Dame (5–1–0) | Michigan (6-1-1) | Michigan (6-1-1) (5) | St. Cloud (8-1-1) | St. Cloud (9-1-2) (12) | St. Cloud (9-1-2) (2) | St. Cloud (11-1-2) (16) | Ferris State (14–2–3) (2) | St. Cloud (11–2–3) | Ferris State (17–3–3) (1) | Boston College (16–4–3) | Boston College (18–4–3) (2) | Boston College (19–4–3) (7) | Minnesota (19–4–5) (1) | Minnesota (21–4–5) (1) | Minnesota (21–4–5) (1) | Boston College (25–5–4) (7) | Boston College (25–5–4) (4) | Union (26–6–4) (7) | Union (28–6–4) (18) | Minnesota (28–7–6) | 2. |
| 3. | Wisconsin (1) | Wisconsin (0–0–0) | Minnesota (2–0–0) | Miami (3–1–0) (1) | Providence (4–0–1) | Notre Dame (6-2-0) | Notre Dame (7-3-0) (1) | Providence (9-1-1) (1) | Michigan (8-2-1) | Michigan (9-2-1) | Michigan (10-2-1) | Michigan (10–2–2) | Ferris State (15–3–3) | Boston College (14–4–3) | Union (15–4–3) | Quinnipiac (18–4–5) | Quinnipiac (19–4–5) | Union (19–6–3) | Union (20–6–4) | Union (22–6–4) | Union (24–6–4) | Union (24–6–4) | Boston College (26–7–4) | Boston College (26–7–4) | Boston College (28–8–4) | 3. |
| 4. | Boston College | Boston College (0–0–0) | Notre Dame (2–0–0) | Michigan (3–0–1) | Michigan (4–1–1) | St. Cloud (5-0-1) | St. Cloud (6-1-1) | Quinnipiac (11-1-1) (1) | Providence (10-2-1) (1) | Providence (11-2-2) | Ferris State (13-2-2) (2) | St. Cloud (11–2–3) (2) | Boston College (13–4–2) | St. Cloud (12–3–3) | Quinnipiac (18–4–5) | Union (16–5–3) | Ferris State (18–6–3) | Ferris State (20–6–3) | St. Cloud (17–6–5) | Ferris State (23–7–3) | St. Cloud (19–8–5) | St. Cloud (21–8–5) | Ferris State (27–9–3) | Wisconsin (24–10–2) | UMass Lowell (26–11–4) | 4. |
| 5. | Minnesota | Minnesota (0–0–0) | Michigan (2–0–0) | Boston College (2–1–0) | Miami (3–2–1) | Providence (5-1-1) | Quinnipiac (9-1-1) (1) | Michigan (7-2-1) | Quinnipiac (12-2-1) | Quinnipiac (13-2-2) | Providence (11-2-3) | Providence (11–2–3) | Union (12–3–3) | Quinnipiac (17–3–5) | St. Cloud (12–4–4) | St. Cloud (13–5–4) | St. Cloud (14–6–4) | Quinnipiac (20–5–5) | Ferris State (21–7–3) | St. Cloud (18–7–5) | Wisconsin (19–9–2) | Wisconsin (21–9–2) | Quinnipiac (24–8–6) | UMass Lowell (25–10–4) (1) | North Dakota (25–14–3) | 5. |
| 6. | North Dakota | Yale (0–0–0) (5) | Boston College (1–1–0) т | Yale (0–0–0) (3) | North Dakota (2–1–1) | Quinnipiac (8-1-0) | Providence (7-1-1) (1) | Notre Dame (8-3-1) | Boston College (8-3-2) | UMass Lowell (10-4-0) | Boston College (10-4-2) | Boston College (10–4–2) | Providence (13–3–4) | Union (13–4–3) | Ferris State (17–5–3) | Ferris State (18–6–3) | Union (17–6–3) | St. Cloud (15–6–5) | Quinnipiac (21–6–5) | Wisconsin (19–9–2) | Quinnipiac (22–8–6) | Ferris State (25–9–3) | Wisconsin (22–10–2) | Ferris State (28–10–3) | Ferris State (29–11–3) | 6. |
| 7. | Notre Dame | North Dakota (0–0–0) | Yale (0–0–0) (3) т | North Dakota (2–1–1) | Boston College (2–2–1) | Miami (5-2-1) | Boston College (6-2-1) | Boston College (7-2-2) | Ferris State (10-2-1) | Ferris State (11-2-2) | Clarkson (12-3-1) | Union (12–2–3) | Quinnipiac (15–3–4) | Providence (13–5–4) | Providence (14–5–5) | Providence (15–6–5) | UMass Lowell (18–7–2) | UMass Lowell (19–7–3) | UMass Lowell (20–7–3) | Quinnipiac (21–8–5) | Ferris State (23–9–3) | Quinnpiac (22–8–6) | UMass Lowell (23–10–4) | Quinnipiac (24–9–6) | Wisconsin (24–11–2) | 7. |
| 8. | Yale (4) | Notre Dame (0–0–0) | North Dakota (1–0–1) | Providence (3–0–0) | St. Cloud (3–0–1) | Boston College (4-2-1) | Miami (6-3-1) | Miami (7-4-1) | UMass Lowell (10-4-0) | Yale (6-2-2) | Quinnipiac (13-3-3) | Quinnipiac (13–3–3) | UMass Lowell (14–5–1) | Yale (8–3–4) | UMass Lowell (15–6–2) | UMass Lowell (16–7–2) | Cornell (12–4–5) | Wisconsin (16–8–2) | Wisconsin (17–9–2) | UMass Lowell (20–8–4) | UMass Lowell (21–9–4) | UMass Lowell (21–9–4) | Notre Dame (23–13–2) | St. Cloud (21–10–5) | St. Cloud State (22–11–5) | 8. |
| 9. | St. Cloud | St. Cloud (0–0–0) | UMass Lowell (1–1–0) | Quinnipiac (3–1–0) | Quinnipiac (6–1–0) | Yale (2-1-1) | Yale (3-1-2) | Yale (4-1-2) | Yale (5-5-2) | Boston College (8-4-2) | Union (10-3-3) | Clarkson (12–3–1) | Michigan (10–4–2) | Wisconsin (13–6–1) | Wisconsin (13–6–1) | Wisconsin (14–7–1) | Providence (15–7–5) | Providence (15–7–5) | Northeastern (17–10–3) | Northeastern (18–10–4) | North Dakota (19–10–3) | North Dakota (20–11–3) | Providence (21–9–6) | Notre Dame (23–14–2) | Providence (22–11–6) | 9. |
| 10. | Michigan | Michigan (0–0–0) | Providence (2–0–0) | St. Cloud (1–0–1) | RPI (4–1–0) | North Dakota (2-3-1) | RPI (6-2-2) | Clarkson (10-3-1) | Notre Dame (8-5-1) | Clarkson (10-3-1) | UMass Lowell (11-5-0) | UMass Lowell (11–5–0) | Yale (7–3–4) | UMass Lowell (14–6–1) | Yale (9–4–4) | Northeastern (15–8–3) | Michigan (13–6–3) | Cornell (12–5–5) | Michigan (14–9–3) | North Dakota (18–9–3) | Providence (19–9–6) | Providence (19–9–6) | St. Cloud (21–10–5) | Providence (21–10–6) | Quinnipiac (24–10–6) | 10. |
| 11. | Quinnipiac | Minnesota State (0–0–0) | St. Cloud (1–0–1) | Wisconsin (2–2–0) | Yale (1–1–0) | UMass Lowell (5-3-0) | Clarkson (9-2-1) | UMass Lowell (8–4–0) | Clarkson (10-3-1) | Notre Dame (9-6-1) | Yale (6-3-3) | Yale (6–3–3) | Clarkson (12–6–2) | Northeastern (13–6–3) | Northeastern (14–7–3) | Cornell (10–4–2) | Northeastern (15–8–3) | Michigan (14–7–3) | North Dakota (16–9–3) | Cornell (14–7–5) | Michigan (16–10–4) | Notre Dame (21–12–2) | North Dakota (22–12–3) | Minnesota State (26–13–1) | Notre Dame (23–15–2) | 11. |
| 12. | Union | New Hampshire (0–0–0) | Denver (2–0–0) | RPI (3–1–0) | Wisconsin (2–2–0) | Wisconsin (3-2-1) | Wisconsin (3-2-1) | Wisconsin (4-3-1) | Miami (7-6-1) | Miami (8-6-2) | Miami (9-7-2) | Miami (9–7–2) | Cornell (8–4–3) | Cornell (8–4–3) | Cornell (9–4–4) | Michigan (12–6–2) | Wisconsin (14–8–2) | Northeastern (16–9–3) | Providence (15–9–6) | Providence (17–9–6) | Notre Dame (20–12–2) | Cornell (15–8–5) | Michigan (18–12–4) | Colgate (20–13–5) | Minnesota State (26–14–1) | 12. |
| 13. | New Hampshire | Quinnipiac (0–0–0) | New Hampshire (1–1–0) | New Hampshire (3–1–0) | Lake Superior (4–0–0) | RPI (5-2-1) | UMass Lowell (5-4-0) | Ferris State (8-2-1) | Wisconsin (4-3–1) | Lake Superior (9-4-1) | Notre Dame (10-7-1) | Cornell (7–4–2) | Miami (9–7–2) | Michigan (10–6–2) | Clarkson (15–7–2) | Yale (10–5–4) | Yale (11–6–4) | Yale (12–7–4) | Cornell (12–7–5) | Michigan (15–10–3) | Cornell (15–8–5) | Michigan (17–11–4) | Cornell (17–9–5) | North Dakota (23–13–3) | Colgate (20–14–5) | 13. |
| 14. | Minnesota State | Providence (0–0–0) | Quinnipiac (1–1–0) | Boston University (3–1–0) | UMass Lowell (3–3–0) | Cornell (3-1-0) | North Dakota (3-4-1) | North Dakota (4-5-1) | Cornell (6-3-1) | Union (8-3-2) | Cornell (7-4-2) | Notre Dame (10–7–1) | Wisconsin (11–6–1) | Clarkson (13–7–2) | Michigan (10–6–2) | Notre Dame (15–9–1) | Clarkson (16–10–2) | Vermont (15–9–3) | Yale (13–8–4) | Yale (14–8–5) | Northeastern (18–12–4) | Northeastern (18–12–4) | Colgate (19–12–5) | Vermont (20–14–3) | Vermont (20–15–3) | 14. |
| 15. | Providence | Union (0–0–0) | Union (1–0–1) | Lake Superior (4–0–0) | Cornell (2–0–0) | Clarkson (7-2-1) | Ferris State (7-2-0) | Union (6-3-2) | Nebraska-Omaha (8-6-0) | Cornell (7-4-1) | Wisconsin (6-5-1) | Wisconsin (8–5–1) | Notre Dame (10–8–1) | Notre Dame (12–8–1) | Notre Dame (14–8–1) | Clarkson (15–9–2) | Denver (13–8–5) | Clarkson (17–11–2) | Maine (15–10–3) | Colgate (16–11–5) | Yale (15–9–5) | Vermont (19–12–3) | Minnesota State (24–13–1) | Michigan (18–13–4) | Denver (20–16–6) | 15. |
| | Preseason Sep 23 | Week 1 Oct 7 | Week 2 Oct 14 | Week 3 Oct 21 | Week 4 Oct 28 4 | Week 5 Nov 4 | Week 6 Nov 11 | Week 7 Nov 18 | Week 8 Nov 25 | Week 9 Dec 2 | Week 10 Dec 9 | Week 11 Dec 16 | Week 13 Jan 6 | Week 14 Jan 13 | Week 15 Jan 20 | Week 16 Jan 27 | Week 17 Feb 3 | Week 18 Feb 10 | Week 19 Feb 17 | Week 20 Feb 24 | Week 21 Mar 3 | Week 22 Mar 10 | Week 23 Mar 17 | Week 24 Mar 24 | Final Apr 14 | |
| | | None | Dropped: Minnesota-State | Dropped: Denver; UMass Lowell; Union | Dropped: New Hampshire; Boston University | Dropped: Lake Superior | Dropped: Cornell | Dropped: RPI | Dropped: Union; North Dakota | Dropped: Nebraska-Omaha; Wisconsin | Dropped: Lake Superior | None | None | Dropped: Miami | None | None | Dropped: Notre Dame | Dropped: Denver | Dropped: Vermont; Clarkson | Dropped: Maine | Dropped: Colgate | Dropped: Yale | Dropped: Northeastern; Vermont | Dropped: Cornell | Dropped: Michigan | |
