= Three Rivers Classic =

- Sport: College ice hockey
- Founded: 2012
- No. of teams: 4
- Country: United States
- Most recent champion: Brown
- Most titles: Robert Morris (3)

The Three Rivers Classic is a two-day Division I college ice hockey tournament which is held annually at PPG Paints Arena, in Pittsburgh, Pennsylvania. The inaugural tournament took place on December 28–29, 2012 and featured teams from Miami University, Ohio State University, Pennsylvania State University and Robert Morris University. The second tournament was played out on December 27–28, 2013 and featured Penn State, Robert Morris, Boston College and Bowling Green State University. The Classic is the evolution of a showcase of games that the Robert Morris Colonials have played against the Ohio State Buckeyes and Miami RedHawks at either Consol Energy Center or Mellon Arena in previous years.

== Yearly results ==
Year	Champion	Runner-up	Third place	Fourth place
2021–2022	No Tournament Held This Year			
2020–2021	No Tournament Held This Year			
2019–2020	No Tournament Held This Year			
2018–2019	Brown	Union	St. Cloud State	Robert Morris
2017	Providence	Robert Morris	Lake Superior State	Arizona State
2016	Robert Morris	Quinnipiac	Boston College	Ferris State
2015	Robert Morris	UMass Lowell	Penn State	Clarkson
2014	Colgate	Robert Morris	Western Michigan	Penn State
2013	Boston College	Penn State	Bowling Green	Robert Morris
2012	Robert Morris	Miami	Penn State	Ohio State

=== 2018–19 ===
The 2018 Tournament was held in January 2019 due to conflicts with the availability of PPG Paints Arena.

First Round; January 4
Union	7
St. Cloud State	2
Robert Morris	4
Brown	7

Championship; January 5
Brown	6
Union	3
Consolation
St. Cloud State	5
Robert Morris	2

=== 2017 ===
First Round; December 29
Arizona State	0
Providence	6
Robert Morris	5
Lake Superior State	0

Championship; December 30
Robert Morris	1
Providence	2
Consolation
Lake Superior State	4
Arizona State	1

=== 2016 ===
Consolation game between Ferris State and BC was decided in a shootout for the tournament, however the game was officially a tie. BC def. Ferris in the shootout 2–1

First Round; December 29
Boston College	1
Quinnipiac	3
Robert Morris	1
Ferris State	0

Championship; December 30
Robert Morris	5
Quinnipiac	2
Consolation
Boston College	2
Ferris State	1

=== 2015 ===
First Round; December 28
UMass Lowell	3
Clarkson	0
Robert Morris	6
Penn State	4

Championship; December 29
Robert Morris	5
UMass Lowell	3
Consolation
Penn State	5
Clarkson	1

=== 2014 ===
On Day 1 (December 29), the Colgate Raiders defeated the Western Michigan Broncos 2–1, and the Robert Morris Colonials beat the Penn State Nittany Lions by a margin of 4–2.

On Day 2 (December 30), in the consolation game, the Western Michigan Broncos beat the Penn State Nittany Lions 4–1. In the championship game the Colgate Raiders beat the Robert Morris Colonials 6–1, to win their first title.

First Round; December 29
Colgate	2
Western Michigan	1
Robert Morris	4
Penn State	2

Championship; December 30
Colgate	6
Robert Morris	1
Consolation
Western Michigan	4
Penn State	1

=== 2013 ===
On Day 1 (December 27), the Boston College Eagles beat the Bowling Green Falcons 5–0, and the Penn State Nittany Lions beat the Robert Morris Colonials 3–2.

On Day 2 (December 28), in the consolation game the Bowling Green Falcons beat the Robert Morris Colonials 3–2. In the championship game the Boston College Eagles beat the Penn State Nittany Lions 8–2, to win its first title.

First Round; December 27
Boston College	5
Bowling Green	0
Penn State	3
Robert Morris	2

Championship; December 28
Boston College	8
Penn State	2
Consolation
Bowling Green	3
Robert Morris	2

=== 2012 ===
On Day 1 (December 28), the Robert Morris Colonials beat Penn State Nittany Lions 6–0, and the Miami RedHawks beat the Ohio State Buckeyes 1–0.

On Day 2 (December 29), in the consolation game, the Penn State beat the Ohio State Buckeyes 5–4. In the championship game, the Robert Morris Colonials beat the Miami RedHawks 1–0, to win their first title.

First Round; December 28
Robert Morris	6
Penn State	0
Miami	1
Ohio State	0

Championship; December 29
Robert Morris	1
Miami	0
Consolation
Penn State	5
Ohio State	4

== Attendance ==
The total attendance for the inaugural games held on December 28 was listed as 11,663, while 10,797 turned out for the next day's games. The attendance total of 22,460 exceeded what had been hoped for by the event's planners, who estimated only 5,000 - 6,000 fans for each day of the games. The inaugural Classic also took part during the 2012–13 NHL lockout, which may have helped increase interest in the event.
