= 2010–11 San Jose Sharks season =

National Hockey League team season

2010–11 San Jose Sharks
- Pacific Division champions
- Division: 1st Pacific
- Conference: 2nd Western
- 2010–11 record: 48–25–9
- Home record: 25–11–5
- Road record: 23–14–4
- Goals for: 248
- Goals against: 213

Team information
- General manager: Doug Wilson
- Coach: Todd McLellan
- Captain: Joe Thornton
- Alternate captains: Dan Boyle; Ryane Clowe; Patrick Marleau
- Arena: HP Pavilion at San Jose

Team leaders
- Goals: Patrick Marleau (37)
- Assists: Joe Thornton (49)
- Points: Patrick Marleau (73)
- Penalty minutes: Jamal Mayers (124)
- Plus/minus: Jason Demers (+19)
- Wins: Antti Niemi (35)
- Goals against average: Alex Stalock (0.00)

The 2010–11 San Jose Sharks season was the team's' 20th season in the National Hockey League (NHL).

== Off-season ==
Team captain Rob Blake retired on June 18, 2010.

The Sharks announced that they would not offer Evgeni Nabokov a contract for the 2010–11 season.

The Sharks re-signed centers Joe Pavelski and Patrick Marleau to four-year contracts on June 24, 2010.

The Sharks re-signed defenseman Niclas Wallin and center Scott Nichol to one-year contracts on June 26, 2010.

Sharks signed free agent goaltender Antero Nittymaki to a two-year, $4 million contract on July 1, 2010, replacing long-time goaltender Evgeni Nabokov.

The Sharks signed free agent goaltender Antti Niemi to a one-year, $2 million contract on September 2, 2010.

The Sharks selected center Joe Thornton as new team captain for the 2010–11 season. Ryane Clowe will be alternate captain on road games, and Patrick Marleau during home games. Dan Boyle was made a permanent alternate captain.

Antti Niemi has also signed a four-year contract with the Sharks as well.

== Pre-season ==
2010 Pre-season Game Log
#	Date	Visitor	Score	Home	OT	Decision	Record	Recap
1	September 22	San Jose Sharks	2-5	Anaheim Ducks		Niittymaki	0-1
2	September 24	Anaheim Ducks	5-4	San Jose Sharks		Sateri	0-2
3	September 25	San Jose Sharks (SS)	1-2	Phoenix Coyotes (SS)		Greiss	1-2
4	September 25	Phoenix Coyotes (SS)	1-3	San Jose Sharks (SS)		Niemi	1-3
5	September 28	San Jose Sharks	1-3	Vancouver Canucks		Niemi	1-4
6	September 29	Vancouver Canucks	2-6	San Jose Sharks		Niittymaki	2-4
7	October 2	San Jose Sharks	3-2	Adler Mannheim	SO	Niemi	3-4

== Standings ==
=== Divisional standings ===
Pacific Division
		GP	W	L	OTL	ROW	GF	GA	Pts
**1**	**y-San Jose Sharks**	**82**	**48**	**25**	**9**	**43**	**248**	**213**	**105**
**2**	**Anaheim Ducks**	**82**	**47**	**30**	**5**	**43**	**239**	**235**	**99**
**3**	**Phoenix Coyotes**	**82**	**43**	**26**	**13**	**38**	**231**	**226**	**99**
**4**	**Los Angeles Kings**	**82**	**46**	**30**	**6**	**36**	**219**	**198**	**98**
5	Dallas Stars	82	42	29	11	37	227	233	95

=== Conference standings ===
Western Conference
R		Div	GP	W	L	OTL	ROW	GF	GA	Pts
**1**	**p – Vancouver Canucks**	**NW**	**82**	**54**	**19**	**9**	**50**	**262**	**185**	117
**2**	**y – San Jose Sharks**	**PA**	**82**	**48**	**25**	**9**	**43**	**248**	**213**	105
**3**	**y – Detroit Red Wings**	**CE**	**82**	**47**	**25**	**10**	**43**	**261**	**241**	104
**4**	**Anaheim Ducks**	**PA**	**82**	**47**	**30**	**5**	**43**	**239**	**235**	99
**5**	**Nashville Predators**	**CE**	**82**	**44**	**27**	**11**	**38**	**219**	**194**	99
**6**	**Phoenix Coyotes**	**PA**	**82**	**43**	**26**	**13**	**38**	**231**	**226**	99
**7**	**Los Angeles Kings**	**PA**	**82**	**46**	**30**	**6**	**36**	**219**	**198**	98
**8**	**Chicago Blackhawks**	**CE**	**82**	**44**	**29**	**9**	**38**	**258**	**225**	97
8.5
9	Dallas Stars	PA	82	42	29	11	37	227	233	95
10	Calgary Flames	NW	82	41	29	12	32	250	237	94
11	St. Louis Blues	CE	82	38	33	11	34	240	234	87
12	Minnesota Wild	NW	82	39	35	8	36	206	233	86
13	Columbus Blue Jackets	CE	82	34	35	13	29	215	258	81
14	Colorado Avalanche	NW	82	30	44	8	24	227	288	68
15	Edmonton Oilers	NW	82	25	45	12	23	193	269	62

bold – qualified for playoffs; y – Won division; p – Won President's Trophy (best record in NHL)
CE – Central Division, NW – Northwest Division, PA – Pacific Division x – Went into playoffs

== Schedule and results ==
- Green background indicates win (2 points).
- Red background indicates regulation loss (0 points).
- White background indicates overtime/shootout loss (1 point).

2010–11 Game Log

October: 5–3–1 (Home: 2–2–1; Road: 3–1–0)
#	Date	Visitor	Score	Home	OT/SO	Decision	Attendance	Record	Pts	Recap
1	October 8 (in Stockholm, Sweden)	San Jose Sharks	3–2	Columbus Blue Jackets		Niemi	11,324	1–0–0	2	Recap
2	October 9 (in Stockholm, Sweden)	Columbus Blue Jackets	3–2	San Jose Sharks	OT	Niittymaki	9,537	1–0–1	3	Recap
3	October 16	Atlanta Thrashers	4–2	San Jose Sharks		Niemi	17,562	1–1–1	3	Recap
4	October 19	Carolina Hurricanes	5–2	San Jose Sharks		Niemi	17,562	1–2–1	3	Recap
5	October 21	San Jose Sharks	4–2	Colorado Avalanche		Niittymaki	12,803	2–2–1	5	Recap
6	October 23	San Jose Sharks	6–1	Edmonton Oilers		Niittymaki	16,839	3–2–1	7	Recap
7	October 24	San Jose Sharks	0–4	Calgary Flames		Niemi	19,289	3–3–1	7	Recap
8	October 27	New Jersey Devils	2–5	San Jose Sharks		Niittymaki	17,562	4–3–1	9	Recap
9	October 30	Anaheim Ducks	2–5	San Jose Sharks		Niittymaki	17,562	5–3–1	11	Recap

November: 6–5–3 (Home: 5–2–1; Road: 1–3–2)
#	Date	Visitor	Score	Home	OT/SO	Decision	Attendance	Record	Pts	Recap
10	November 2	San Jose Sharks	0–1	Minnesota Wild		Niittymaki	16,502	5–4–1	11	Recap
11	November 4	San Jose Sharks	0–2	St. Louis Blues		Niemi	19,150	5–5–1	11	Recap
12	November 6	Tampa Bay Lightning	2–5	San Jose Sharks		Niittymaki	17,562	6–5–1	13	Recap
13	November 9	Anaheim Ducks	3–2	San Jose Sharks	OT	Niittymaki	17,562	6–5–2	14	Recap
14	November 11	New York Islanders	1–2	San Jose Sharks	SO	Niittymaki	17,562	7–5–2	16	Recap
15	November 13	Calgary Flames	3–4	San Jose Sharks		Niemi	17,562	8–5–2	18	Recap
16	November 15	Los Angeles Kings	3–6	San Jose Sharks		Niittymaki	17,562	9–5–2	20	Recap
17	November 17	San Jose Sharks	3–4	Colorado Avalanche	OT	Niittymaki	12,436	9–5–3	21	Recap
18	November 18	San Jose Sharks	4–5	Dallas Stars	OT	Niemi	14,720	9–5–4	22	Recap
19	November 20	Columbus Blue Jackets	3–0	San Jose Sharks		Niittymaki	17,562	9–6–4	22	Recap
20	November 24	Chicago Blackhawks	2–5	San Jose Sharks		Niemi	17,562	10–6–4	24	Recap
21	November 26	San Jose Sharks	1–6	Vancouver Canucks		Niemi	18,860	10–7–4	24	Recap
22	November 27	San Jose Sharks	4–3	Edmonton Oilers		Niittymaki	16,839	11–7–4	26	Recap
23	November 30	Detroit Red Wings	3–5	San Jose Sharks		Niittymaki	17,562	11–8–4	26	Recap

December: 9–5–1 (Home: 3–1–1; Road: 6–4–0)
#	Date	Visitor	Score	Home	OT/SO	Decision	Attendance	Record	Pts	Recap
24	December 2	San Jose Sharks	4–0	Ottawa Senators		Niemi	18,017	12–8–4	28	Recap
25	December 4	San Jose Sharks	1–3	Montreal Canadiens		Niemi	21,273	12–9–4	28	Recap
26	December 6	San Jose Sharks	5–2	Detroit Red Wings		Niemi	19,010	13–9–4	30	Recap
27	December 8	San Jose Sharks	5–4	Philadelphia Flyers	SO	Niittymaki	19,801	14–9–4	32	Recap
28	December 9	San Jose Sharks	3–6	Buffalo Sabres		Niemi	18,017	14–10–4	32	Recap
29	December 11	Chicago Blackhawks	1–2	San Jose Sharks	OT	Niemi	17,562	15–10–4	34	Recap
30	December 13	Dallas Stars	3–2	San Jose Sharks	SO	Niemi	17,562	15–10–5	35	Recap
31	December 15	San Jose Sharks	2–3	Nashville Predators		Niemi	14,731	15–11–5	35	Recap
32	December 16	San Jose Sharks	4–3	Dallas Stars	OT	Niittymaki	14,899	16–11–5	37	Recap
33	December 18	San Jose Sharks	4–1	St. Louis Blues		Niittymaki	19,150	17–11–5	39	Recap
34	December 21	Edmonton Oilers	1–2	San Jose Sharks		Niittymaki	17,562	18–11–5	41	Recap
35	December 23	Phoenix Coyotes	1–4	San Jose Sharks		Niemi	17,562	19–11–5	43	Recap
36	December 27	Los Angeles Kings	4–0	San Jose Sharks		Niemi	17,562	19–12–5	43	Recap
37	December 29	San Jose Sharks	3–5	Minnesota Wild		Niittymaki	19,131	19–13–5	43	Recap
38	December 30	San Jose Sharks	5–3	Chicago Blackhawks		Niemi	22,112	20–13–5	45	Recap

January: 5–6–1 (Home: 2–5–0; Road: 3–1–1)
#	Date	Visitor	Score	Home	OT/SO	Decision	Attendance	Record	Pts	Recap
39	January 1	San Jose Sharks	1–0	Los Angeles Kings		Niemi	18,118	21–13–5	47	Recap
40	January 3	Vancouver Canucks	4–3	San Jose Sharks		Niemi	17,562	21–14–5	47	Recap
41	January 6	Buffalo Sabres	3–0	San Jose Sharks		Niittymaki	17,562	21–15–5	47	Recap
42	January 8	Nashville Predators	2–1	San Jose Sharks		Niemi	17,562	21–16–5	47	Recap
43	January 9	San Jose Sharks	0–1	Anaheim Ducks		Niemi	16,172	21–17–5	47	Recap
44	January 11	Toronto Maple Leafs	4–2	San Jose Sharks		Niemi	17,562	21–18–5	47	Recap
45	January 13	Edmonton Oilers	5–2	San Jose Sharks		Niittymaki	17,562	21–19–5	47	Recap
46	January 15	St. Louis Blues	2–4	San Jose Sharks		Niemi	17,562	22–19–5	49	Recap
47	January 17	San Jose Sharks	4–2	Phoenix Coyotes		Niemi	9,672	23–19–5	51	Recap
48	January 20	San Jose Sharks	2–1	Vancouver Canucks	SO	Niemi	18,860	24–19–5	53	Recap
49	January 22	Minnesota Wild	3–4	San Jose Sharks		Niemi	17,562	25–19–5	55	Recap
50	January 26	San Jose Sharks	2–3	Los Angeles Kings	SO	Niemi	18,118	25–19–6	56	Recap

February: 11–2–0 (Home: 3–0–0; Road: 8–2–0)
#	Date	Visitor	Score	Home	OT/SO	Decision	Attendance	Record	Pts	Recap
51	February 1	Phoenix Coyotes	3–5	San Jose Sharks		Niemi	17,562	26–19–6	58	Recap
52	February 2	San Jose Sharks	4–3	Anaheim Ducks		Niemi	14,486	27–19–6	60	Recap
53	February 5	San Jose Sharks	2–0	Boston Bruins		Niemi	17,565	28–19–6	62	Recap
54	February 8	San Jose Sharks	2–0	Washington Capitals		Niemi	18,398	29–19–6	64	Recap
55	February 9	San Jose Sharks	3–2	Columbus Blue Jackets		Niemi	11,906	30–19–6	66	Recap
56	February 11	San Jose Sharks	1–2	New Jersey Devils		Niemi	17,102	30–20–6	66	Recap
57	February 13	San Jose Sharks	2–3	Florida Panthers		Niemi	16,217	30–21–6	66	Recap
58	February 15	San Jose Sharks	2–1	Nashville Predators	OT	Niemi	16,217	31–21–6	68	Recap
59	February 17	Washington Capitals	2–3	San Jose Sharks		Niemi	17,562	32–21–6	70	Recap
60	February 19	Colorado Avalanche	0–4	San Jose Sharks		Niemi	17,562	33–21–6	72	Recap
61	February 22	San Jose Sharks	4–3	Detroit Red Wings		Niemi	17,562	34–21–6	74	Recap
62	February 23	San Jose Sharks	3–2	Pittsburgh Penguins	OT	Niemi	18,253	35–21–6	76	Recap
63	February 25	San Jose Sharks	4–3	Calgary Flames	SO	Niemi	19,289	36–21–6	78	Recap

March: 9–2–3 (Home: 7–1–2; Road: 2–1–1)
#	Date	Visitor	Score	Home	OT/SO	Decision	Attendance	Record	Pts	Recap
64	March 1	Colorado Avalanche	1–2	San Jose Sharks	OT	Niemi	17,562	37–21–6	80	Recap
65	March 3	Detroit Red Wings	1–3	San Jose Sharks		Niemi	17,562	38–21–6	82	Recap
66	March 5	Dallas Stars	3–2	San Jose Sharks		Niemi	17,562	38–22–6	82	Recap
67	March 8	Nashville Predators	2–3	San Jose Sharks	OT	Niemi	17,562	39–22–6	84	Recap
68	March 10	Vancouver Canucks	5–4	San Jose Sharks	SO	Niemi	17,562	39–22–7	85	Recap
69	March 12	New York Rangers	3–2	San Jose Sharks	SO	Niemi	17,562	39–22–8	86	Recap
70	March 14	San Jose Sharks	3–6	Chicago Blackhawks		Niemi	22,094	39–23–8	86	Recap
71	March 15	San Jose Sharks	6–3	Dallas Stars		Niemi	16,724	40–23–8	88	Recap
72	March 17	Minnesota Wild	2–3	San Jose Sharks		Niemi	17,562	41–23–8	90	Recap
73	March 19	St. Louis Blues	3–5	San Jose Sharks		Niemi	17,562	42–23–8	92	Recap
74	March 23	Calgary Flames	3–6	San Jose Sharks		Niemi	17,562	43–23–8	94	Recap
75	March 24	San Jose Sharks	2–3	Los Angeles Kings	SO	Niemi	18,118	43–23–9	95	Recap
76	March 26	San Jose Sharks	4–1	Phoenix Coyotes		Niemi	16,394	44–23–9	97	Recap
77	March 31	Dallas Stars	0–6	San Jose Sharks		Niemi	17,562	45–23–9	99	Recap

April: 3–2–0 (Home: 3–0–0; Road: 0–2–0)
#	Date	Visitor	Score	Home	OT/SO	Decision	Attendance	Record	Pts	Recap
78	April 2	Anaheim Ducks	2–4	San Jose Sharks		Niemi	17,562	46–23–9	101	Recap
79	April 4	Los Angeles Kings	1–6	San Jose Sharks		Niemi	17,562	47–23–9	103	Recap
80	April 6	San Jose Sharks	2–6	Anaheim Ducks		Nittymaki	15,649	47–24–9	103	Recap
81	April 8	San Jose Sharks	3–4	Phoenix Coyotes		Niemi	17,125	47–25–9	103	Recap
82	April 9	Phoenix Coyotes	1–3	San Jose Sharks		Niemi	17,562	48–25–9	105	Recap

== Playoffs ==
The Sharks clinched a playoff spot after beating the Dallas Stars 6–0 on March 31, 2011 in front of the sellout crowd of 17,562 at the HP Pavilion. This makes it seven consecutive seasons of making the playoffs for the Sharks. The Sharks also made the Conference Finals for the third time in franchise history.

2011 Stanley Cup playoffs

Western Conference Quarter-finals: vs. (7) Los Angeles Kings – Sharks win series 4–2
#	Date	Visitor	Score	Home	OT	Decision	Attendance	Series	Recap
1	April 14	Los Angeles	2–3	San Jose	OT	Niemi	17,562	1–0	Recap
2	April 16	Los Angeles	4–0	San Jose		Niemi	17,562	1–1	Recap
3	April 19	San Jose	6–5	Los Angeles	OT	Nittymaki	18,216	2–1	Recap
4	April 21	San Jose	6–3	Los Angeles		Niemi	18,234	3–1	Recap
5	April 23	Los Angeles	3–1	San Jose		Niemi	17,562	3–2	Recap
6	April 25	San Jose	4–3	Los Angeles	OT	Niemi	18,118	4–2	Recap

Western Conference Semi-finals: vs. (3) Detroit Red Wings – Sharks win series 4–3
#	Date	Visitor	Score	Home	OT	Decision	Attendance	Series	Recap
1	April 29	Detroit	1–2	San Jose	OT	Niemi	17,562	1–0	Recap
2	May 1	Detroit	1–2	San Jose		Niemi	17,562	2–0	Recap
3	May 4	San Jose	4–3	Detroit	OT	Niemi	20,066	3–0	Recap
4	May 6	San Jose	3–4	Detroit		Niemi	20,066	3–1	Recap
5	May 8	Detroit	4–3	San Jose		Niemi	17,562	3–2	Recap
6	May 10	San Jose	1–3	Detroit		Niemi	20,066	3–3	Recap
7	May 12	Detroit	2–3	San Jose		Niemi	17,562	4–3	Recap

Western Conference Finals: vs. (1) Vancouver Canucks – Vancouver wins series 4–1
#	Date	Visitor	Score	Home	OT	Decision	Attendance	Series	Recap
1	May 15	San Jose	2–3	Vancouver		Niemi	18,860	1–0	Recap
2	May 18	San Jose	3–7	Vancouver		Niemi	18,860	2–0	Recap
3	May 20	Vancouver	3–4	San Jose		Niemi	17,562	2–1	Recap
4	May 22	Vancouver	4–2	San Jose		Niemi	17,562	3–1	Recap
5	May 24	San Jose	2–3	Vancouver	2OT	Niemi	18,860	4–1	Recap

Legend: Win Loss

== Player statistics ==
=== Skaters ===
Note: GP = Games played; G = Goals; A = Assists; Pts = Points; +/− = Plus/minus; PIM = Penalty minutes

Updated April 11, 2011.

Regular season

Player	GP	G	A	Pts	+/−	PIM
Patrick Marleau	82	37	36	73	-3	16
Joe Thornton	80	21	49	70	4	47
Joe Pavelski	74	20	46	66	10	24
Dany Heatley	80	26	38	64	8	56
Ryane Clowe	75	24	38	62	13	100
Logan Couture	79	32	24	56	18	41
Dan Boyle	76	9	41	50	2	67
Devin Setoguchi	72	22	19	41	-2	37
Jason Demers	75	2	22	24	19	28
Torrey Mitchell	66	9	14	23	10	46
Marc-Edouard Vlasic	80	4	14	18	14	18
Douglas Murray	73	1	13	14	5	44
Jamal Mayers	78	3	11	14	3	124
Kyle Wellwood	35	5	8	13	10	0
Justin Braun	28	2	9	11	-1	2
Kent Huskins	50	2	8	10	8	12
Ian White^{†}	23	2	8	10	9	8
Benn Ferriero	33	5	4	9	8	9
Niclas Wallin	74	3	5	8	0	46
Scott Nichol	56	4	3	7	-3	50
Ben Eager^{†}	34	4	3	7	0	43
Jamie McGinn	49	1	5	6	-6	33
John McCarthy	37	2	2	4	-8	8
Derek Joslin^{‡}	17	1	3	4	-2	8
Andrew Desjardins	17	1	2	3	-1	4
Mike Moore	6	1	0	1	-1	7
Tommy Wingels	5	0	0	0	-1	0
Brandon Mashinter	13	0	0	0	-2	17
Frazer McLaren	9	0	0	0	-1	22

Playoffs

Player	GP	G	A	Pts	+/−	PIM
Joe Thornton	18	3	14	17	-5	16
Dan Boyle	18	4	12	16	-7	8
Ryane Clowe	17	6	9	15	5	32
Logan Couture	18	7	7	14	2	2
Patrick Marleau	18	7	6	13	-1	9
Joe Pavelski	18	5	5	10	1	10
Devin Setoguchi	18	7	3	10	-7	12
Dany Heatley	18	3	6	9	-2	12
Ian White	17	1	8	9	3	8
Kyle Wellwood	18	1	6	7	6	0
Torrey Mitchell	18	1	4	5	0	10
Niclas Wallin	18	1	3	4	2	10
Marc-Edouard Vlasic	18	0	3	3	4	4
Jason Demers	13	2	1	3	-1	8
Kent Huskins	5	0	1	1	1	2
Douglas Murray	18	0	1	1	-7	8
Ben Eager	10	1	0	1	-2	41
Andrew Desjardins	3	1	0	1	1	4
Jamie McGinn	7	0	1	1	0	30
Benn Ferriero	8	1	0	1	0	6
Jamal Mayers	12	0	0	0	-3	12
Scott Nichol	15	0	0	0	-7	26
Justin Braun	1	0	0	0	-1	0

=== Goaltenders ===
GP = Games played; MIN = Time On Ice in minutes; W = Wins; L = Losses; OT = Overtime losses; GA = Goals against; GAA = Goals against average; SA = Shots against; SV = Saves; SV% = Save percentage; SO = Shutouts; G = Goals; A = Assists; PEN = Penalty Time in minutes

Regular season

Player	GP	MIN	W	L	OT	GA	GAA	SA	SV%	SO	G	A	PEN
Antti Niemi	60	3524	35	18	6	140	2.38	1741	.920	6	0	1	2
Antero Niittymaki	24	1414	12	7	3	64	2.72	615	.896	0	0	0	2
Alex Stalock	1	30	1	0	0	0	0.00	9	1.000	0	0	0	0

Playoffs

Player	GP	Min	W	L	GA	GAA	SA	Sv%	SO	G	A	PEN
Antti Niemi	18	1044	8	9	56	3.22	538	.896	0	0	0	0
Antero Niittymaki	2	91	1	1	1	0.66	30	.967	0	0	0	0

^{†}Denotes player spent time with another team before joining Sharks. Stats reflect time with the Sharks only.
^{‡}Traded mid-season
Bold/italics denotes franchise record

== Awards and records ==
=== Awards ===
Regular Season
Player	Award	Awarded
Joe Thornton	NHL Second Star of the Week	November 1, 2010
Ryane Clowe	NHL First Star of the Week	December 13, 2010
Logan Couture	NHL Rookie of the Month	December 2010
Antti Niemi	NHL First Star of the Week	February 21, 2011
Antti Niemi	NHL Second Star of the Month	February 2011
Joe Pavelski	NHL First Star of the Week	March 21, 2011

=== Milestones ===
Regular Season
Player	Milestone	Reached
Tommy Wingels	1st Career NHL Game	October 8, 2010
Dany Heatley	300th Career NHL Goal	October 16, 2010
Mike Moore	1st Career NHL Game	October 19, 2010
Scott Nichol	500th Career NHL Game	October 19, 2010
John McCarthy	1st Career NHL Assist; 1st Career NHL Point	October 21, 2010
Devin Setoguchi	200th Career NHL Game	October 21, 2010
John McCarthy	1st Career NHL Goal	October 23, 2010
Jamie McGinn	100th Career NHL Game	October 23, 2010
Patrick Marleau	700th Career NHL Point	October 27, 2010
Joe Pavelski	100th Career NHL Assist	October 30, 2010
Dany Heatley	600th Career NHL Game	November 4, 2010
Douglas Murray	300th Career NHL Game	November 4, 2010
Ryane Clowe	100th Career NHL Assist	November 13, 2010
Mike Moore	1st Career NHL Goal; 1st Career NHL Point	November 17, 2010
Justin Braun	1st Career NHL Game	November 26, 2010
Justin Braun	1st Career NHL Assist; 1st Career NHL Point	November 27, 2010
Justin Braun	1st Career NHL Goal	December 2, 2010
Dan Boyle	700th Career NHL Game	December 2, 2010
Joe Pavelski	300th Career NHL Game	December 4, 2010
Derek Joslin	1st Career NHL Goal	December 13, 2010
Joe Pavelski	200th Career NHL Point	December 16, 2010
Brandon Mashinter	1st Career NHL Game	December 29, 2010
Marc-Edouard Vlasic	100th Career NHL Point	January 1, 2011
Andrew Desjardins	1st Career NHL Game	January 3, 2011
Patrick Marleau	1,000th Career NHL Game	January 17, 2011
Alex Stalock	1st Career NHL Game; 1st Career NHL Win	February 1, 2011
Jason Demers	100th Career NHL Game	February 9, 2011
Ben Eager	300th Career NHL Game	February 15, 2011
Ryane Clowe	300th Career NHL Game	February 19, 2011
Ian White	100th Career NHL Assist	February 19, 2011
Ryane Clowe	200th Career NHL Point	February 22, 2011
Joe Thornton	300th Career NHL Goal	February 22, 2011
Niclas Wallin	600th Career NHL Game	March 3, 2011
Jamal Mayers	800th Career NHL Game	March 8, 2011
Patrick Marleau	400th Career NHL Assist	March 14, 2011
Andrew Desjardins	1st Career NHL Goal; 1st Career NHL Point	March 23, 2011
Joe Pavelski	100th Career NHL Goal	March 24, 2011
Jamal Mayers	200th Career NHL Point	March 26, 2011
Kyle Wellwood	100th Career NHL Assist	March 31, 2011
Logan Couture	100th Career NHL Game	April 2, 2011
Torrey Mitchell	200th Career NHL Game	April 2, 2011
Andrew Desjardins	1st Career NHL Assist	April 4, 2011
Antti Niemi	100th Career NHL Game	April 4, 2011
Joe Thornton	1,000th Career NHL Point	April 8, 2011
Ian White	400th Career NHL Game	April 8, 2011

Playoffs
Player	Milestone	Reached
Ian White	1st Career NHL Playoff Game; 1st Career NHL Playoff Assist; 1st Career NHL Playoff Point	April 14, 2011
Justin Braun	1st Career NHL Playoff Game	April 16, 2011
Logan Couture	1st Career NHL Playoff Assist	April 19, 2011
Antero Niittymaki	1st Career NHL Playoff Win	April 19, 2011
Benn Ferriero	1st Career NHL Playoff Goal; 1st Career NHL Playoff Point	April 29, 2011
Ian White	1st Career NHL Playoff Goal	May 1, 2011
Joe Thornton	100th Career NHL Playoff Game	May 4, 2011
Andrew Desjardins	1st Career NHL Playoff Game	May 20, 2011
Andrew Desjardins	1st Career NHL Playoff Goal; 1st Career NHL Playoff Point	May 22, 2011
Jamie McGinn	1st Career NHL Playoff Assist; 1st Career NHL Playoff Point	May 22, 2011

== Transactions ==
On January 20, 2011, the Sharks signed Jordan White, a University of British Columbia Thunderbirds goalie to a one-day amateur contract to provide emergency backup goalie for the game against the Vancouver Canucks after Antero Niittymaki was injured during a morning practice session. White wore uniform number 35 but did not see any on-ice game time.

The Sharks have been involved in the following transactions during the 2010–11 season.

=== Trades ===
Date	Details
June 21, 2010	To Minnesota Wild Brad Staubitz	To San Jose Sharks 5th-round pick in 2010 – Freddie Hamilton
June 24, 2010	To Atlanta Thrashers Future considerations	To San Jose Sharks Michael Vernace; Brett Sterling; 7th-round pick in 2010 – Lee Moffie
June 26, 2010	To Calgary Flames Henrik Karlsson	To San Jose Sharks 6th-round pick in 2010 – Konrad Abeltshauser
June 26, 2010	To Pittsburgh Penguins 7th-round pick in 2011 – Scott Wilson	To San Jose Sharks 7th-round pick in 2010 – Chris Crane
January 18, 2011	To Atlanta Thrashers 5th-round pick in 2011 – Austen Brassard	To San Jose Sharks Ben Eager
February 9, 2011	To New Jersey Devils Steven Zalewski; Jay Leach	To San Jose Sharks Patrick Davis; Michael Swift
February 18, 2011	To Carolina Hurricanes Derek Joslin	To San Jose Sharks Future considerations
February 18, 2011	To Carolina Hurricanes 2nd-round pick in 2012 – Brock McGinn	To San Jose Sharks Ian White

=== Free agents acquired ===
Player	Former team	Contract terms
Carter Hutton	Adirondack Phantoms	1 year, $560,000 entry-level contract
Antero Niittymaki	Tampa Bay Lightning	2 years, $4 million
T. J. Trevelyan	Worcester Sharks	1 year, $500,000
Sean Sullivan	San Antonio Rampage	1 year, $500,000
Jamal Mayers	Calgary Flames	1 year, $600,000
Antti Niemi	Chicago Blackhawks	1 year, $2 million
Michael Sgarbossa	Saginaw Spirit	3 years, $1.685 million entry-level contract
Curt Gogol	Saskatoon Blades	3 years, $1.64 million entry-level contract
J. P. Anderson	Mississauga St. Michael's Majors	3 years, $1.66 million entry-level contract
Sena Acolatse	Prince George Cougars	3 years, $2.090 million entry-level contract
James Livingston	Plymouth Whalers	3 years, $1.8 million entry-level contract
Mike Connolly	Minnesota-Duluth Bulldogs	2 years, $1.38 million entry-level contract
Brodie Reid	Northeastern Huskies	2 years, $1.38 million entry-level contract

=== Free agents lost ===
Player	New team	Contract terms
Evgeni Nabokov	SKA Saint Petersburg	4 years, $24 million
Manny Malhotra	Vancouver Canucks	3 years, $7.5 million
Brett Sterling	Pittsburgh Penguins	1 year, $500,000
Mike Vernace	Tampa Bay Lightning	1 year, $500,000
Ryan Vesce	Torpedo Nizhny Novgorod	undisclosed
Dwight Helminen	Pelicans	1 year
Joe Callahan	Florida Panthers	1 year, $525,000

=== Claimed via waivers ===
Player	Former team	Date claimed off waivers
Kyle Wellwood	St. Louis Blues	January 18, 2011

=== Lost via waivers ===
Player	New team	Date claimed off waivers

=== Lost via retirement ===
Player
Rob Blake

=== Players signings ===
Player	Contract terms
Tommy Wingels	2 years, $1.375 million entry-level contract
Taylor Doherty	2 years, $1.43 million entry-level contract
Marek Viedensky	3 years, $1.8 million entry-level contract
Harri Sateri	3 years, $2.0375 million entry-level contract
Joe Pavelski	4 years, $16 million
Patrick Marleau	4 years, $27.6 million
Scott Nichol	1 year, $760,000
Niclas Wallin	1 year, $2.5 million
Andrew Desjardins	1 year, $500,000
Cam MacIntyre	2 years, $1.2 million
Jay Leach	1 year, $500,000
Jason Demers	2 years, $2.5 million contract extension
Devin Setoguchi	1 year, $1.8 million
Steven Zalewski	1 year, $500,000
Derek Joslin	1 year, $500,000
Joe Thornton	3 years, $21 million contract extension
Antti Niemi	4 years, $15.2 million contract extension

== Draft picks ==
San Jose's picks at the 2010 NHL entry draft in Los Angeles.

Round	#	Player	Position	Nationality	College/Junior/Club team (League)
1	28	Charlie Coyle	C/RW	United States	South Shore Kings (EJHL)
3	88	Max Gaede	RW	United States	Woodbury High School (USHS-MN)
5	127 (from Carolina)	Cody Ferriero	C	United States	The Governor's Academy (USHS-MA)
5	129 (from Minnesota)	Freddie Hamilton	C	Canada	Niagara IceDogs (OHL)
5	136 (from Ottawa)	Isaac Macleod	D	Canada	Penticton Vees (BCHL)
6	163 (from Calgary)	Konrad Abeltshauser	D	Germany	Halifax Mooseheads (QMJHL)
7	188 (from Atlanta)	Lee Moffie	D	United States	University of Michigan (CCHA)
7	200 (from Pittsburgh)	Chris Crane	RW	United States	Green Bay Gamblers (USHL)

== Farm teams ==
=== Worcester Sharks ===
The Sharks' affiliate in the American Hockey League is the Worcester Sharks.

=== Stockton Thunder ===
The Sharks' affiliate in the ECHL is the Stockton Thunder for 2010–11.
