= 2007 Calder Cup playoffs =

North American ice hockey tournament

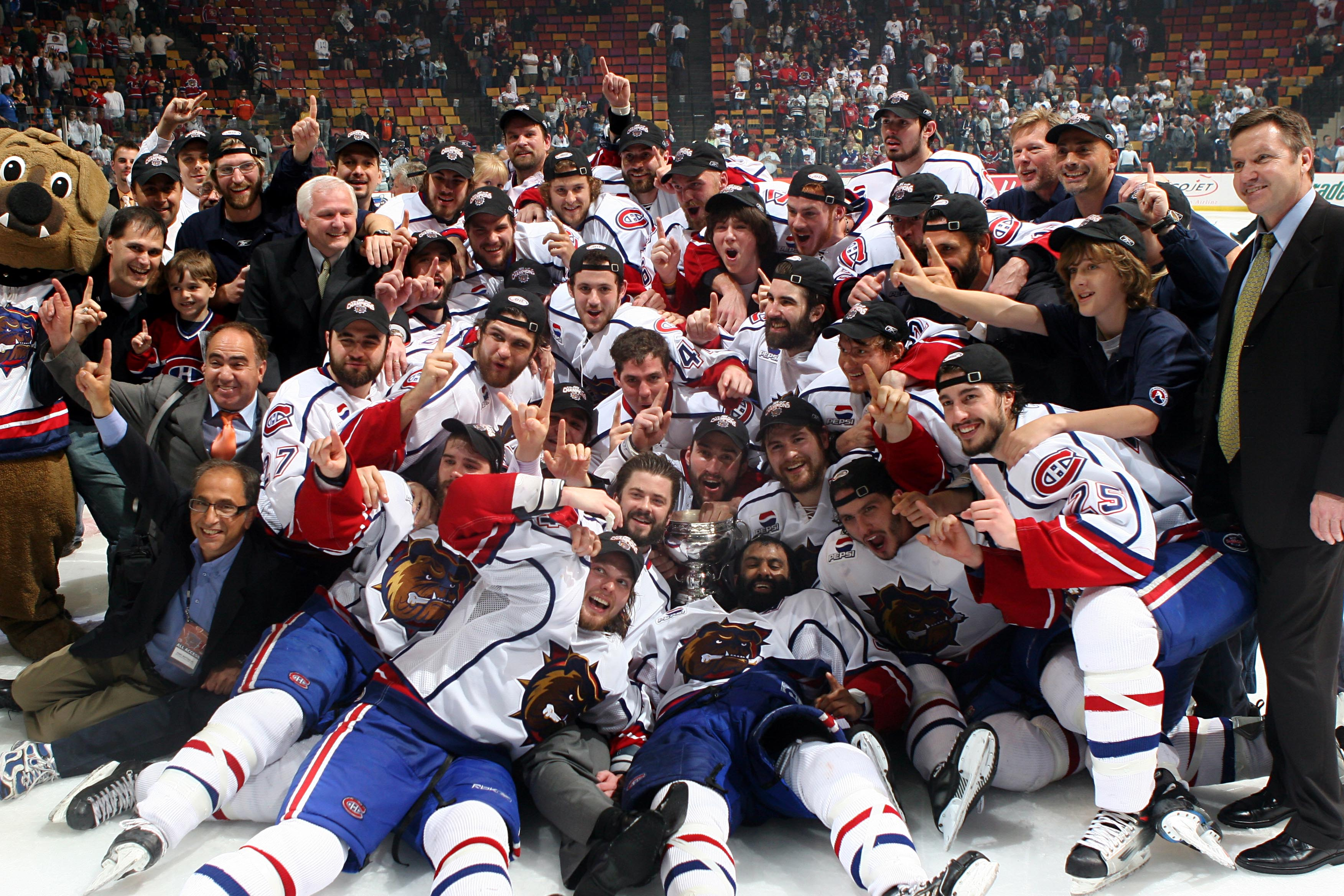
- The champion Hamilton Bulldogs

Tournament details
- Dates: April 18 – June 7, 2007
- Teams: 16

Final positions
- Champions: Hamilton Bulldogs
- Runners-up: Hershey Bears

The 2007 Calder Cup Playoffs of the American Hockey League began on April 18, 2007. The sixteen teams that qualified, eight from each conference, played best-of-7 series for division semifinals, finals and conference finals. The conference champions played a best-of-7 series for the Calder Cup. The Calder Cup Final ended on June 7, 2007 with the Hamilton Bulldogs defeating the Hershey Bears four games to one to win the first Calder Cup in team history. This was a rematch of the 1997 Calder Cup Final, where Hershey defeated Hamilton in five games.

Carey Price won the Jack A. Butterfield Trophy as playoff MVP, and became only the third teenage goaltender to lead his team to a Calder Cup championship in AHL history.

== Playoff seeds ==
After the 2006–07 AHL regular season, 16 teams qualified for the playoffs. The top four teams from each division qualified for the playoffs. However, it was possible for the fifth-placed team in the West Division to take the spot of the fourth-placed team in the North Division if they earned more points, since the North Division had one fewer team. This did not occur as the Grand Rapids Griffins, the fourth-placed team in the North Division finished with 85 points while the Peoria Rivermen, the fifth-placed team in the West Division, finished with 84 points. The Hershey Bears were the Eastern Conference regular season champions as well as the Macgregor Kilpatrick Trophy winners with the best overall regular season record. The Omaha Ak-Sar-Ben Knights were the Western Conference regular season champions.

=== Eastern Conference ===
==== Atlantic Division ====
1. Manchester Monarchs – 110 points
2. Hartford Wolf Pack – 98 points
3. Providence Bruins – 94 points
4. Worcester Sharks – 93 points

==== East Division ====
1. Hershey Bears – Eastern Conference regular season champions; Macgregor Kilpatrick Trophy winners, 114 points
2. Wilkes-Barre/Scranton Penguins – 108 points
3. Norfolk Admirals – 108 points
4. Albany River Rats – 81 points

=== Western Conference ===
==== North Division ====
1. Manitoba Moose – 102 points
2. Rochester Americans – 98 points
3. Hamilton Bulldogs – 95 points
4. Grand Rapids Griffins – 85 points

==== West Division ====
1. Omaha Ak-Sar-Ben Knights – Western Conference regular season champions, 104 points
2. Chicago Wolves – 101 points
3. Milwaukee Admirals – 96 points
4. Iowa Stars – 88 points

== Bracket ==
Division Semifinals	Division Finals
A1	Manchester	4
A4	Worcester	2
A1	Manchester	4
Atlantic Division
A3	Providence	2
A2	Hartford	3
A3	Providence	4
Eastern Conference
E1	Hershey	4
E4	Albany	1
E1	Hershey	4
East Division
E2	Wilkes-Barre/Scranton	1
E2	Wilkes-Barre/Scranton	4
E3	Norfolk	2
N1	Manitoba	4
N4	Grand Rapids	3
N1	Manitoba	2
North Division
N3	Hamilton	4
N2	Rochester	2
N3	Hamilton	4
Western Conference
W1	Omaha	2
W4	Iowa	4
W4	Iowa	2
West Division
W2	Chicago	4
W2	Chicago	4
W3	Milwaukee	0

Conference Finals
A1	Manchester	0
E1	Hershey	4
N3	Hamilton	4
W2	Chicago	1

Calder Cup Final
E1	Hershey	1
N3	Hamilton	4

In each round the higher seed receives home ice advantage, meaning they can play a maximum of four home games if the series reaches seven games. There is no set series format for each series due to arena scheduling conflicts and travel considerations.

== Division Semifinals ==
Note 1: All times are in Eastern Time (UTC−4).
Note 2: Game times in italics signify games to be played only if necessary.
Note 3: Home team is listed first.

=== Eastern Conference ===
==== Atlantic Division ====
===== (A1) Manchester Monarchs vs. (A4) Worcester Sharks =====
April 18	Manchester Monarchs	5 – 2	Worcester Sharks	Verizon Wireless Arena
1:57 - Oleg Tverdovsky (1); 11:52 - pp - Peter Harrold (1); 13:15 - John Zeiler (1)		First period	Graham Mink (1) - 5:24
5:02 - Marty Murray (1)		Second period	No scoring
9:54 - Petr Kanko (1)		Third period	Grant Stevenson (1) - pp - 7:45
Barry Brust 27 saves / 29 shots		Goalie stats	Thomas Greiss 8 saves / 11 shots Dimitri Patzold 18 saves / 20 shots

April 20	Manchester Monarchs	4 – 3	2OT	Worcester Sharks	Verizon Wireless Arena
1:15 - Tim Jackman (1)		First period		Mike Iggulden (1) - pp - 3:39
8:53 - Matt Ryan (1)		Second period		No scoring
9:07 - pp - Patrick O'Sullivan (1)		Third period		Mathieu Darche (1) - pp - 1:07; Mathieu Darche (2) - 7:14
19:12 - John Zeiler (2)		Second overtime period		No scoring
Jason LaBarbera 44 saves / 47 shots		Goalie stats		Thomas Greiss 43 saves / 47 shots

April 21	Worcester Sharks	0 – 5	Manchester Monarchs	DCU Center
No scoring		First period	Matt Ryan (2) - 5:02; Marty Murray (2) - 13:26
No scoring		Second period	Noah Clarke (1) - 4:02
No scoring		Third period	Brian Boyle (1) - pp - 6:19; Patrick O'Sullivan (2) - 17:41
Thomas Greiss 26 saves / 31 shots		Goalie stats	Jason LaBarbera 26 saves / 26 shots

April 25	Worcester Sharks	3 – 2	Manchester Monarchs	DCU Center
15:46 - Tom Walsh (1)		First period	No scoring
11:11 - pp - Mike Iggulden (2)		Second period	Patrick O'Sullivan (3) - 4:56; Matt Moulson (1) - 19:12
12:24 - Tom Walsh (2)		Third period	No scoring
Dimitri Patzold 27 saves / 29 shots		Goalie stats	Jason LaBarbera 34 saves / 37 shots

April 27	Manchester Monarchs	1 – 4	Worcester Sharks	Verizon Wireless Arena

April 28	Worcester Sharks	2 – 3	2OT	Manchester Monarchs	DCU Center

Manchester won series 4 – 2

===== (A2) Hartford Wolf Pack vs. (A3) Providence Bruins =====
April 18	Hartford Wolf Pack	5 – 1	Providence Bruins	XL Center

April 20	Hartford Wolf Pack	2 – 4	Providence Bruins	XL Center

April 21	Providence Bruins	2 – 5	Hartford Wolf Pack	Dunkin' Donuts Center

April 24	Providence Bruins	5 – 1	Hartford Wolf Pack	Dunkin' Donuts Center

April 26	Providence Bruins	0 – 1	Hartford Wolf Pack	Dunkin' Donuts Center

April 28	Hartford Wolf Pack	2 – 5	Providence Bruins	XL Center

April 29	Hartford Wolf Pack	4 – 5	Providence Bruins	XL Center

Providence won series 4 – 3

==== East Division ====
===== (E1) Hershey Bears vs. (E4) Albany River Rats =====
April 18	Hershey Bears	3 – 2	Albany River Rats	GIANT Center
No scoring		First period	No scoring
0:41 - sh - Dave Steckel (1)		Second period	Cody McCormick (1) - 7:02; Ryan Bayda (1) - 15:00
4:59 - pp - Tomas Fleischmann (1); 12:36 - pp - Kyle Wilson (1)		Third period	No scoring
Frederic Cassivi 21 saves / 23 shots		Goalie stats	Tyler Weiman 35 saves / 38 shots

April 19	Hershey Bears	2 – 3	OT	Albany River Rats	GIANT Center

April 22	Albany River Rats	5 – 6	Hershey Bears	Glens Falls Civic Center

April 23	Albany River Rats	1 – 3	Hershey Bears	Glens Falls Civic Center

April 25	Albany River Rats	2 – 4	Hershey Bears	Glens Falls Civic Center

Hershey won series 4 – 1

===== (E2) Wilkes-Barre/Scranton Penguins vs. (E3) Norfolk Admirals =====
April 20	Wilkes-Barre/Scranton Penguins	2 – 5	Norfolk Admirals	Wachovia Arena at Casey Plaza
No scoring		First period	Jonas Nordqvist (1) - 3:56
6:41 - pp - Kyle Brodziak (1); 8:47 - Stephen Dixon (1)		Second period	P. A. Parenteau (1) - pp - 4:22
No scoring		Third period	Colin Fraser (1) - 13:39; Troy Brouwer (1) - pp - 15:10; Carl Corazzini (1) - en - 19:11
Nolan Schaefer 27 saves / 31 shots		Goalie stats	Corey Crawford 28 saves / 30 shots

April 21	Wilkes-Barre/Scranton Penguins	5 – 2	Norfolk Admirals	Wachovia Arena at Casey Plaza
1:28 - pp - Kurtis McLean (1); 16:57 - pp - Micki DuPont (1)		First period	Adam Burish (1) - 2:40
No scoring		Second period	No scoring
6:11 - Jonathan Filewich (1); 6:42 - Robert Nilsson (1); 18:52 - pp - Jonathan Filewich (2)		Third period	Jonas Nordqvist (2) - pp - 10:02
Nolan Schaefer 29 saves / 31 shots		Goalie stats	Corey Crawford 25 saves / 30 shots

April 23	Norfolk Admirals	2 – 3	OT	Wilkes-Barre/Scranton Penguins	Norfolk Scope

April 25	Norfolk Admirals	4 – 1	Wilkes-Barre/Scranton Penguins	Norfolk Scope

April 27	Norfolk Admirals	1 – 8	Wilkes-Barre/Scranton Penguins	Norfolk Scope

April 29	Wilkes-Barre/Scranton Penguins	3 – 2	Norfolk Admirals	Wachovia Arena at Casey Plaza

Wilkes-Barre/Scranton won series 4 – 2

=== Western Conference ===
==== North Division ====
===== (N1) Manitoba Moose vs. (N4) Grand Rapids Griffins =====
April 19	Manitoba Moose	1 – 0	Grand Rapids Griffins	MTS Centre

April 21	Manitoba Moose	1 – 4	Grand Rapids Griffins	MTS Centre

April 23	Grand Rapids Griffins	2 – 1	OT	Manitoba Moose	Van Andel Arena

April 25	Grand Rapids Griffins	1 – 4	Manitoba Moose	Van Andel Arena

April 27	Grand Rapids Griffins	4 – 3	OT	Manitoba Moose	Van Andel Arena

April 29	Manitoba Moose	2 – 1	Grand Rapids Griffins	MTS Centre

May 1	Manitoba Moose	4 – 1	Grand Rapids Griffins	MTS Centre

Manitoba won series 4 – 3

===== (N2) Rochester Americans vs. (N3) Hamilton Bulldogs =====
April 19	Rochester Americans	0 – 2	Hamilton Bulldogs	Blue Cross Arena at the War Memorial	Recap
No scoring		First period	No scoring
No scoring		Second period	Zack Stortini (1) - 3:34
No scoring		Third period	Maxim Lapierre (1) - en - 19:51
Craig Anderson 28 saves / 29 shots		Goalie stats	Carey Price 34 saves / 34 shots

April 21	Rochester Americans	3 – 1	Hamilton Bulldogs	Blue Cross Arena at the War Memorial	Recap

April 22	Hamilton Bulldogs	5 – 4	2OT	Rochester Americans	Copps Coliseum	Recap

April 24	Hamilton Bulldogs	3 – 4	Rochester Americans	Copps Coliseum	Recap

April 26	Rochester Americans	2 – 4	Hamilton Bulldogs	Blue Cross Arena at the War Memorial	Recap

April 28	Hamilton Bulldogs	6 – 2	Rochester Americans	Copps Coliseum	Recap

Hamilton won series 4 – 2

==== West Division ====
===== (W1) Omaha Ak-Sar-Ben Knights vs. (W4) Iowa Stars =====
April 20	Omaha Ak-Sar-Ben Knights	4 – 2	Iowa Stars	Omaha Civic Auditorium
12:25 - Justin Taylor (1)		First period	Dan Hacker (1) - pp - 16:56
14:40 - pp - Chris Lee (1)		Second period	Paul Szczechura (1) - pp - 12:39
9:21 - Adam Pardy (1); 14:22 - Warren Peters (1)		Third period	No scoring
Curtis McElhinney 17 saves / 19 shots		Goalie stats	Dan Ellis 16 saves / 20 shots

April 21	Omaha Ak-Sar-Ben Knights	1 – 2	OT	Iowa Stars	Omaha Civic Auditorium

April 23	Iowa Stars	2 – 1	Omaha Ak-Sar-Ben Knights	Wells Fargo Arena

April 25	Iowa Stars	3 – 2	Omaha Ak-Sar-Ben Knights	Wells Fargo Arena

April 27	Omaha Ak-Sar-Ben Knights	3 – 2	OT	Iowa Stars	Omaha Civic Auditorium

April 28	Iowa Stars	5 – 2	Omaha Ak-Sar-Ben Knights	Wells Fargo Arena

Iowa won series 4 – 2

===== (W2) Chicago Wolves vs. (W3) Milwaukee Admirals =====
April 20	Chicago Wolves	3 – 2	Milwaukee Admirals	Allstate Arena

April 22	Chicago Wolves	4 – 1	Milwaukee Admirals	Allstate Arena

April 24	Milwaukee Admirals	2 – 3	Chicago Wolves	Bradley Center

April 25	Milwaukee Admirals	2 – 3	OT	Chicago Wolves	Bradley Center

Chicago won series 4 – 0

== Division Finals ==
=== Eastern Conference ===
==== Atlantic Division ====
===== (A1) Manchester Monarchs vs. (A3) Providence Bruins =====
May 1	Manchester Monarchs	3 – 6	Providence Bruins	Verizon Wireless Arena

May 2	Manchester Monarchs	4 – 1	Providence Bruins	Verizon Wireless Arena

May 8	Providence Bruins	2 – 1	Manchester Monarchs	Dunkin' Donuts Center

May 9	Providence Bruins	2 – 3	Manchester Monarchs	Dunkin' Donuts Center

May 12	Manchester Monarchs	4 – 3	Providence Bruins	Verizon Wireless Arena

May 14	Providence Bruins	1 – 2	Manchester Monarchs	Dunkin' Donuts Center

Manchester won series 4 – 2

==== East Division ====
===== (E1) Hershey Bears vs. (E2) Wilkes-Barre/Scranton Penguins =====
May 2	Hershey Bears	4 – 3	Wilkes-Barre/Scranton Penguins	GIANT Center

May 4	Hershey Bears	4 – 3	2OT	Wilkes-Barre/Scranton Penguins	GIANT Center

May 5	Wilkes-Barre/Scranton Penguins	0 – 2	Hershey Bears	Wachovia Arena at Casey Plaza

May 9	Wilkes-Barre/Scranton Penguins	3 – 2	OT	Hershey Bears	Wachovia Arena at Casey Plaza

May 11	Hershey Bears	7 – 6	OT	Wilkes-Barre/Scranton Penguins	GIANT Center

Hershey won series 4 – 1

=== Western Conference ===
==== North Division ====
===== (N1) Manitoba Moose vs. (N3) Hamilton Bulldogs =====
May 5	Manitoba Moose	1 – 2	Hamilton Bulldogs	MTS Centre	Recap

May 6	Manitoba Moose	2 – 3	Hamilton Bulldogs	MTS Centre	Recap

May 8	Hamilton Bulldogs	2 – 3	Manitoba Moose	Copps Coliseum	Recap

May 12	Hamilton Bulldogs	2 – 3	Manitoba Moose	Copps Coliseum	Recap

May 13	Hamilton Bulldogs	3 – 1	Manitoba Moose	Copps Coliseum	Recap

May 14	Manitoba Moose	2 – 3	OT	Hamilton Bulldogs	MTS Centre	Recap

Hamilton won series 4 – 2

==== West Division ====
===== (W2) Chicago Wolves vs. (W4) Iowa Stars =====
May 2	Chicago Wolves	7 – 0	Iowa Stars	Allstate Arena

May 4	Chicago Wolves	4 – 5	Iowa Stars	Allstate Arena

May 6	Iowa Stars	3 – 5	Chicago Wolves	Wells Fargo Arena

May 8	Iowa Stars	1 – 6	Chicago Wolves	Wells Fargo Arena

May 10	Iowa Stars	5 – 1	Chicago Wolves	Wells Fargo Arena

May 12	Chicago Wolves	5 – 1	Iowa Stars	Allstate Arena

Chicago won series 4 – 2

== Conference finals ==
=== Eastern Conference ===
==== (E1) Hershey Bears vs. (A1) Manchester Monarchs ====
May 19	Hershey Bears	7 – 2	Manchester Monarchs	GIANT Center

May 20	Hershey Bears	4 – 1	Manchester Monarchs	GIANT Center

May 23	Manchester Monarchs	1 – 4	Hershey Bears	Verizon Wireless Arena

May 26	Manchester Monarchs	1 – 3	Hershey Bears	Verizon Wireless Arena

Hershey won series 4 – 0

=== Western Conference ===
==== (W2) Chicago Wolves vs. (N3) Hamilton Bulldogs ====
May 18	Chicago Wolves	5 – 6	2OT	Hamilton Bulldogs	Allstate Arena	Recap

May 20	Chicago Wolves	2 – 3	OT	Hamilton Bulldogs	Allstate Arena	Recap

May 23	Hamilton Bulldogs	2 – 1	Chicago Wolves	Copps Coliseum	Recap

May 25	Hamilton Bulldogs	0 – 1	Chicago Wolves	Copps Coliseum	Recap

May 26	Hamilton Bulldogs	3 – 1	Chicago Wolves	Copps Coliseum	Recap

Hamilton won series 4 – 1

== Calder Cup Final ==
=== (E1) Hershey Bears vs. (N3) Hamilton Bulldogs ===
June 1	Hershey Bears	0 – 4	Hamilton Bulldogs	GIANT Center	Recap

June 2	Hershey Bears	4 – 2	Hamilton Bulldogs	GIANT Center	Recap

June 4	Hamilton Bulldogs	5 – 2	Hershey Bears	Copps Coliseum	Recap

June 6	Hamilton Bulldogs	6 – 2	Hershey Bears	Copps Coliseum	Recap

June 7	Hamilton Bulldogs	2 – 1	Hershey Bears	Copps Coliseum	Recap

Hamilton won series 4 – 1

== See also ==
- 2006–07 AHL season
- List of AHL seasons

Preceded by 2006 Calder Cup playoffs	Calder Cup playoffs 2007	Succeeded by 2008 Calder Cup playoffs
