= Rob Davison =

Canadian ice hockey player (born 1980)

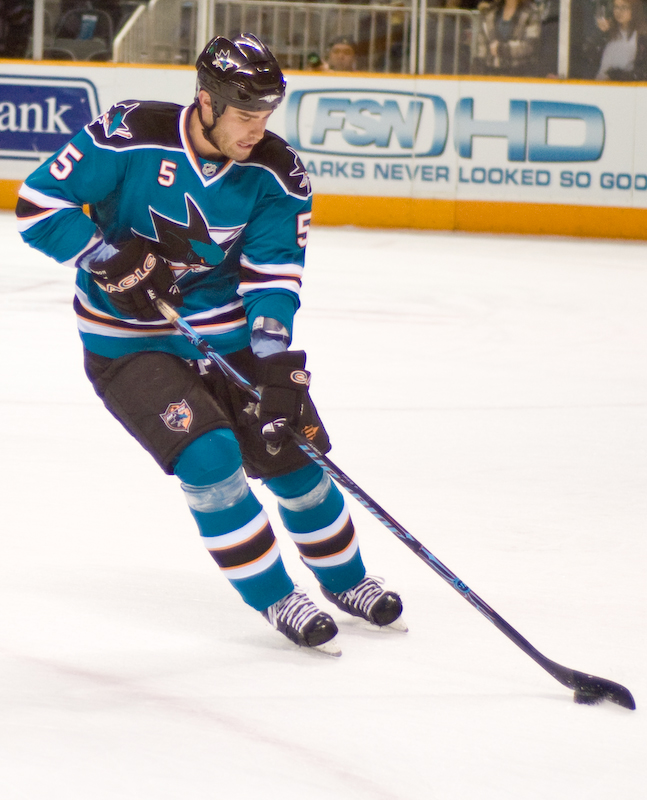
- Born: May 1, 1980 (age 46) St. Catharines, Ontario, Canada
- Height: 6 ft 3 in (191 cm)
- Weight: 220 lb (100 kg; 15 st 10 lb)
- Position: Defence
- Shot: Left
- Played for: NHL; San Jose Sharks; New York Islanders; Vancouver Canucks; New Jersey Devils; CZE; HC Ocelari Trinec; EBEL; EC Red Bull Salzburg; EIHL; Cardiff Devils
- NHL draft: 98th overall, 1998; San Jose Sharks
- Playing career: 2000–2014

Robert W. Davison (born May 1, 1980) is a Canadian professional ice hockey coach and former player. A defenceman, Davison played for the San Jose Sharks, New York Islanders, Vancouver Canucks, and New Jersey Devils of the National Hockey League (NHL). He is a former assistant coach of the Toronto Marlies, the American Hockey League affiliate of the Toronto Maple Leafs.

== Playing career ==
Davison began his junior career in the Ontario Provincial Junior A Hockey League, for the St. Michael's Buzzers in 1996-97. The following year, he joined the North Bay Centennials of the major junior Ontario Hockey League. After posting 11 points in 59 games, he was drafted by the San Jose Sharks in the fourth round, 98th overall, in the 1998 NHL entry draft. Davison returned to North Bay for another two seasons before making his professional debut with the Sharks' minor league affiliate, the Kentucky Thoroughblades of the American Hockey League in 2000–01.

The following season, the Thoroughblades relocated from Kentucky and became the Cleveland Barons. Davison scored his first professional goal that season, in 2001–02.

In 2002–03, following the trade of defenceman Bryan Marchment, Davison was called up from Cleveland and made his NHL debut with the Sharks. In his third game, he scored his first NHL goal against Martin Gerber in a 3-2 overtime loss to the Mighty Ducks of Anaheim. Davison finished the season with 3 points in 15 games with San Jose.

During the 2004–05 NHL lockout, Davison played in the UK's Elite Ice Hockey League with the Cardiff Devils. He recorded 7 goals (second among team defencemen) and 15 points in 50 games as the Devils finished the season as Challenge Cup runners-up.

When NHL play resumed the following season, in 2005–06, Davison scored a career-high 6 points in 69 games. He remained with the Sharks until February 26, 2008, when he was traded to the New York Islanders in exchange for a seventh round draft pick (Jason Demers) in 2008.

On March 18, 2008, in a game against the Toronto Maple Leafs, Davison scored one of the longest goals in NHL history when a shorthanded clearing attempt from around his own goal line took several bounces along the ice before skipping over the glove of goalie and former Sharks teammate Vesa Toskala and into the net for the Islanders' lone tally in a 3–1 loss. The 197-foot shot was only Davison's third goal in 187 career games.

After one season with the Islanders, he was signed by the Vancouver Canucks to a one-year, $560,000 deal on July 10, 2008, as an unrestricted free agent. Davison was acquired by his former agent Mike Gillis, the newly appointed general manager of the Canucks.

On July 31, 2009, Davison was signed by the New Jersey Devils. Davison played one game for the Devils in the current season, spending most of his time with the AHL's Lowell Devils.

After two seasons abroad in Europe with HC Oceláři Třinec and EC Red Bull Salzburg, Davison returned to the San Jose Sharks, his original draft team, on a one-year, two-way contract on July 7, 2013. Davison served as the Captain of the Sharks' AHL affiliate Worcester Sharks, and on December 31, 2013 against the Adirondack Phantoms, he played his 700th career professional game; 345 were in the AHL, 219 were in the NHL, and 136 were in Europe.

== Coaching career ==
On July 26, 2014, Davison retired to become an assistant coach with EC Red Bull Salzburg. After a two-year stint, and two championships in Salzburg, he left the team at the conclusion of the 2015–16 season and joined the coaching staff of HC Dinamo Minsk of the Kontinental Hockey League (KHL) as an assistant. On July 17, 2017, Davison was appointed assistant coach of the Toronto Marlies, winning the Calder Cup in the 2017–18 season.

== Career statistics ==
			Regular season					Playoffs
Season	Team	League	GP	G	A	Pts	PIM	GP	G	A	Pts	PIM
1996–97	St. Michael's Buzzers	OPJHL	45	2	6	8	93	6	0	0	0	9
1997–98	North Bay Centennials	OHL	59	0	11	11	200	—	—	—	—	—
1998–99	North Bay Centennials	OHL	59	2	17	19	150	4	0	1	1	12
1999–00	North Bay Centennials	OHL	67	4	6	10	194	6	0	1	1	8
2000–01	Kentucky Thoroughblades	AHL	72	0	4	4	230	3	0	0	0	0
2001–02	Cleveland Barons	AHL	70	1	3	4	206	—	—	—	—	—
2002–03	Cleveland Barons	AHL	42	1	3	4	82	—	—	—	—	—
2002–03	San Jose Sharks	NHL	15	1	2	3	22	—	—	—	—	—
2003–04	San Jose Sharks	NHL	55	0	3	3	92	5	0	2	2	4
2004–05	Cardiff Devils	EIHL	50	7	8	15	160	8	0	1	1	12
2005–06	San Jose Sharks	NHL	69	1	5	6	76	1	0	0	0	0
2006–07	San Jose Sharks	NHL	22	0	2	2	27	—	—	—	—	—
2007–08	San Jose Sharks	NHL	15	0	0	0	21	—	—	—	—	—
2007–08	New York Islanders	NHL	19	1	1	2	32	—	—	—	—	—
2008–09	Vancouver Canucks	NHL	23	0	2	2	51	—	—	—	—	—
2009–10	Lowell Devils	AHL	70	4	13	17	182	5	0	1	1	12
2009–10	New Jersey Devils	NHL	1	0	0	0	0	—	—	—	—	—
2010–11	Albany Devils	AHL	63	4	14	18	151	—	—	—	—	—
2011–12	HC Oceláři Třinec	CZE	19	1	2	3	12	—	—	—	—	—
2011–12	EC Red Bull Salzburg	EBEL	14	0	4	4	35	3	0	1	1	14
2012–13	EC Red Bull Salzburg	EBEL	53	3	6	9	54	8	0	1	1	24
2013–14	Worcester Sharks	AHL	65	3	6	9	113	—	—	—	—	—
NHL totals			219	3	15	18	321	6	0	2	2	4

== Awards and achievements ==
- North Bay Centennials Defensive Player of the Year - 2000
- North Bay Centennials Scholastic Player of the Year - 2000
- European Trophy Champion 2011 (Captain)
- Austrian Champion 2015
- EBEL Champion 2015
- Austrian Champion 2016
- EBEL Champion 2016
- Calder Cup Champion 2018
