= Riley Armstrong (ice hockey) =

Canadian ice hockey player and coach

- Born: November 8, 1984 (age 41) Lloydminster, Saskatchewan, Canada
- Height: 5 ft 11 in (180 cm)
- Weight: 180 lb (82 kg; 12 st 12 lb)
- Position: Right wing
- Shot: Right
- Played for: San Jose Sharks; Barys Astana; Augsburger Panther; SaiPa; HC Vita Hästen
- NHL draft: Undrafted
- Playing career: 2004–2016

Riley Armstrong (born November 8, 1984) is a Canadian professional ice hockey coach and a former player. He is currently the director of player development for the Philadelphia Flyers of the National Hockey League since 2023. He played two games with the San Jose Sharks of the National Hockey League (NHL) as a forward during the 2008–09 season.

== Playing career ==
=== Amateur ===
Armstrong was born in Lloydminster, Saskatchewan, but grew up in Saskatoon, Saskatchewan. He attended Sacred Heart High School in Yorkton, Saskatchewan in grade 11 and 12 while playing AAA Midget, and also St. Joseph High School in Saskatoon with his brother Colby Armstrong, who also played in the NHL.

After playing minor hockey with the Saskatoon Redwings (and figure skating out of Martensville and Saskatoon Figure Skating Club, coached by his mother Rosemary), Armstrong left to play Midget AAA with the Yorkton Mallers, where he scored 44 goals and 77 points in 40 games, finishing 3rd in league scoring. Armstrong began playing for the Kootenay Ice of the Western Hockey League (WHL) in the 2002–03 season, scoring 6 goals. He was then traded to the Everett Silvertips during the 2003–04 season, scoring 18 goals.

=== Professional ===
On September 15, 2004, he was signed as a free agent by the San Jose Sharks. Armstrong was immediately sent down to the Cleveland Barons for two seasons, scoring a combined 12 goals. Armstrong spent the next three years with new Sharks affiliate, the Worcester Sharks before he made his NHL debut in the 2008-09 season with San Jose on November 29, 2008, in a 3–2 win over the Phoenix Coyotes playing on a line with Jeremy Roenick and Jody Shelley.

On July 2, 2009, Armstrong signed with the Calgary Flames. He was then assigned to its affiliate, the Abbotsford Heat. On March 3, 2010, Armstrong was traded to the Detroit Red Wings, linking up with their affiliate, the Grand Rapids Griffins. He joined the Utah Grizzlies in November 2010, playing in two games and recording two assists and four penalty minutes. He was signed by Barys Astana on November 21, 2010. In late 2010 on December 29, Armstrong was signed on to play with Augsburger Panther of the Deutsche Eishockey Liga for the remainder of the season.

Armstrong was signed to a contract by the Elmira Jackals on October 8, 2011. After seven games with the team, Armstrong was signed to a PTO contract by the Binghamton Senators on November 17, 2011. He was later released back to Elmira on December 17. Armstrong signed with Finnish team SaiPa on December 25, 2011, and finished the season with the team.

Without a contract extension offer from SaiPa, Armstrong had an unsuccessful try-out with HC Ambrì-Piotta of the Swiss NLA before returning to the Utah Grizzlies of the ECHL for the commencement of the 2012–13 season where he was captain of the Grizzlies.

On July 19, 2013, Armstrong signed as a free agent to return to Europe on a one-year contract with German club, EV Landshut of the DEL2.

Following another season in Europe in Sweden and Germany with HC Vita Hästen and Heilbronner Falken respectively, Armstrong returned as a free agent for a third stint with the Utah Grizzlies, signing a one-year contract on August 4, 2015. Prior to the 2015–16 season, Armstrong was placed on waivers by the Grizzlies and was claimed by the Reading Royals on October 11, 2015.

== Coaching career ==
Armstrong ended his playing career in 2016, opting to pursue a career in coaching. On August 31, 2016, he was announced as the new assistant coach for the Wheeling Nailers of the ECHL under head coach Jeff Christian. On February 17, 2018, he was announced as the inaugural head coach of the Maine Mariners of the ECHL.

Over his first two seasons as head coach, he led the team to a 69–58–7 record. The Mariners then sat out the 2020–21 season due to the COVID-19 pandemic. In August 2021, he joined the Philadelphia Flyers' coaching staff as an assistant with their American Hockey League (AHL) affiliate, the Lehigh Valley Phantoms.

== Career statistics ==
			Regular season					Playoffs
Season	Team	League	GP	G	A	Pts	PIM	GP	G	A	Pts	PIM
2002–03	Kootenay Ice	WHL	65	6	10	16	69	10	0	1	1	14
2003–04	Everett Silvertips	WHL	69	18	26	44	119	21	5	4	9	46
2004–05	Cleveland Barons	AHL	70	8	11	19	117	—	—	—	—	—
2005–06	Cleveland Barons	AHL	64	4	5	9	67	—	—	—	—	—
2006–07	Worcester Sharks	AHL	73	19	17	36	108	6	0	1	1	12
2007–08	Worcester Sharks	AHL	64	15	19	34	91	—	—	—	—	—
2008–09	Worcester Sharks	AHL	71	25	17	42	101	12	3	10	13	46
2008–09	San Jose Sharks	NHL	2	0	0	0	2	—	—	—	—	—
2009–10	Abbotsford Heat	AHL	38	11	8	19	55	—	—	—	—	—
2009–10	Grand Rapids Griffins	AHL	17	3	2	5	14	—	—	—	—	—
2010–11	Utah Grizzlies	ECHL	2	0	2	2	4	—	—	—	—	—
2010–11	Barys Astana	KHL	9	1	0	1	16	—	—	—	—	—
2010–11	Augsburger Panther	DEL	17	5	3	8	40	—	—	—	—	—
2011–12	Elmira Jackals	ECHL	9	3	4	7	14	—	—	—	—	—
2011–12	Binghamton Senators	AHL	5	1	2	3	6	—	—	—	—	—
2011–12	SaiPa	SM-l	12	2	3	5	32	—	—	—	—	—
2012–13	Utah Grizzlies	ECHL	38	16	21	37	120	4	2	1	3	10
2012–13	Hamilton Bulldogs	AHL	2	0	0	0	2	—	—	—	—	—
2013–14	EV Landshut	DEL2	45	24	40	64	99	13	3	4	7	20
2014–15	HC Vita Hästen	Allsv	25	6	7	13	24	—	—	—	—	—
2014–15	Heilbronner Falken	DEL2	21	8	12	20	97	—	—	—	—	—
2015–16	Reading Royals	ECHL	26	4	8	12	40	—	—	—	—	—
AHL totals			387	83	104	162	547	18	3	11	14	58
NHL totals			2	0	0	0	2	—	—	—	—	—
