= Roy Sommer =

American ice hockey player (born 1957)

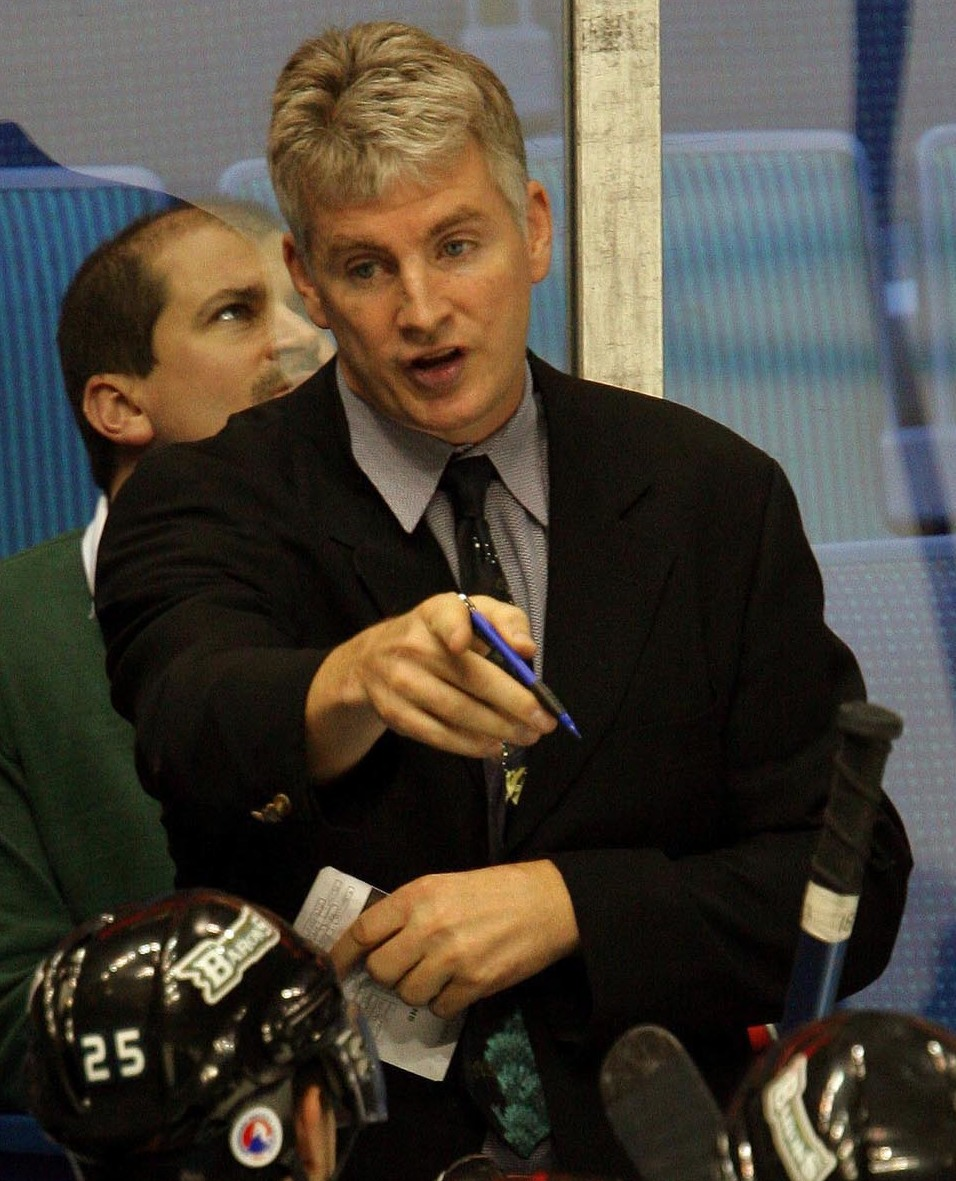
- Sommer in 2004
- Born: April 5, 1957 (age 69) Oakland, California, U.S.
- Height: 6 ft 0 in (183 cm)
- Weight: 180 lb (82 kg; 12 st 12 lb)
- Position: Center
- Shot: Left
- Played for: Edmonton Oilers (NHL)
- NHL draft: 101st overall, 1977; Toronto Maple Leafs
- Playing career: 1977–1987
- Coaching career: 1987–2024

Roy A. Sommer (born April 5, 1957) is an American former ice hockey coach and player, who currently serves as the player development coordinator for the men’s hockey program at the College of the Holy Cross.

Inducted into the American Hockey League Hall of Fame in 2024, Sommer has won and coached in more games than anyone in AHL history, spending 24 of his 25 seasons as head coach of the AHL affiliates of the San Jose Sharks.

Sommer played three games for the Edmonton Oilers of the National Hockey League during the 1980–81 season, before spending the rest of his playing career, which lasted from 1977 to 1987, in the minor leagues.

Sommer grew up in the San Francisco area where he played youth hockey for Skyline High School before moving to Calgary at age 17. He was the first product of California hockey to reach the NHL.

== Playing career ==
Drafted by the Toronto Maple Leafs in 1977, Sommer represented the United States at the 1976-77 IIHF World Junior Championship before playing 10 seasons professionally.

On January 28, 1981, Sommer made his NHL debut with the Edmonton Oilers and scored a goal in a 9-1 victory over the Montreal Canadiens.

Sommer won two championships as a player – an American Hockey League Calder Cup with the Maine Mariners in 1984 and an International Hockey League Turner Cup with the Muskegon Lumberjacks in 1986.

== Coaching career ==
Sommer served as an assistant for the San Jose Sharks during the 1997-98 NHL season before being named head coach of the AHL’s Kentucky Thoroughblades on May 28, 1998. That began a run of 24 years leading the Sharks’ AHL prospects with Kentucky (1998 to 2001), the Cleveland Barons (2001 to 2006), the Worcester Sharks (2006 to 2015) and the San Jose Barracuda (2015 to 2022). More than 150 of his players went on to play in the National Hockey League.

On February 10, 2016, while with the Barracuda, Sommer became the winningest head coach in AHL history when he reached 637 wins. He surpassed Bun Cook, who spent 19 seasons as a head coach in the AHL. He won the Louis A. R. Pieri Memorial Award as the AHL's coach of the year in 2017 after leading the Barracuda to the best regular season finish in the AHL's Pacific Division.

On December 11, 2019, after the Sharks fired head coach Peter DeBoer and his staff, Sommer left the San Jose Barracuda to serve as the Sharks’ associate coach under interim head coach Bob Boughner. After working the final 37 games of the 2019–20 NHL season with the Sharks, Sommer returned to the Barracuda on September 22, 2020.

Sommer won his 800th game as a head coach on January 8, 2022, against the Henderson Silver Knights. On May 18, he transitioned to a senior advisory role within the team as assistant John McCarthy was named his successor. In 24 seasons with the Sharks organization, he recorded 808 wins against 721 losses, 48 ties, and 159 overtime defeats.

On July 12, 2022, shortly after Mike Grier was hired to replace Doug Wilson as the Sharks GM, Sommer was named head coach of the San Diego Gulls.

On April 15, 2023, Sommer announced his intention to retire at the conclusion of the season. He finished his AHL tenure with 828 wins, 770 losses, 48 ties and 168 overtime/shootout losses in 1,814 games over 25 seasons as a head coach.

Sommer ended his retirement to take over as head coach of the Western Hockey League’s Wenatchee Wild on October 12, 2023.

He was inducted into the AHL Hall of Fame on February 5, 2024, in a ceremony that took place during the league’s All-Star festivities in San Jose.

== Personal life ==
Sommer and his wife, Melissa, have three children together: son Marley, who has Down syndrome; son Castan, associate head coach of men’s ice hockey at the College of the Holy Cross; and daughter Kira.

== Career statistics ==
=== Regular season and playoffs ===
			Regular season					Playoffs
Season	Team	League	GP	G	A	Pts	PIM	GP	G	A	Pts	PIM
1974–75	Edmonton Oil Kings	WCHL	1	0	0	0	5	—	—	—	—	—
1974–75	Spruce Grove Mets	AJHL	53	16	19	35	185	—	—	—	—	—
1975–76	Calgary Centennials	WCHL	70	13	24	37	155	—	—	—	—	—
1976–77	Calgary Centennials	WCHL	50	16	22	38	111	9	5	9	14	8
1977–78	Saginaw Gears	IHL	12	2	3	5	2	—	—	—	—	—
1977–78	Grand Rapids Owls	IHL	45	20	18	38	67	—	—	—	—	—
1978–79	Spokane Flyers	PHL	45	19	30	49	196	—	—	—	—	—
1979–80	Grand Rapids Owls	IHL	9	1	4	5	32	—	—	—	—	—
1979–80	Houston Apollos	CHL	69	24	31	55	246	6	2	2	4	8
1980–81	Wichita Wind	CHL	57	13	22	35	212	14	3	2	5	61
1980–81	Edmonton Oilers	NHL	3	1	0	1	7	—	—	—	—	—
1981–82	Wichita Wind	CHL	76	17	28	45	193	—	—	—	—	—
1982–83	Wichita Wind	CHL	73	22	39	61	130	—	—	—	—	—
1983–84	Maine Mariners	AHL	67	7	10	17	202	14	6	1	7	24
1984–85	Maine Mariners	AHL	80	12	13	25	175	11	4	2	6	27
1985–86	Indianapolis Checkers	IHL	37	9	10	19	118	—	—	—	—	—
1985–86	Muskegon Lumberjacks	IHL	27	5	8	13	109	12	2	4	6	92
1986–87	Muskegon Lumberjacks	IHL	65	14	13	27	219	15	3	3	6	44
CHL totals			275	76	120	196	781	20	5	4	9	69
IHL totals			195	51	56	107	547	27	5	7	12	136
NHL totals			3	1	0	1	7	—	—	—	—	—

=== International ===
Year	Team	Event	GP	G	A	Pts	PIM
1977	United States	WJC	7	3	1	4	0
Junior totals			7	3	1	4	0
