= Frazer McLaren =

Canadian ice hockey player

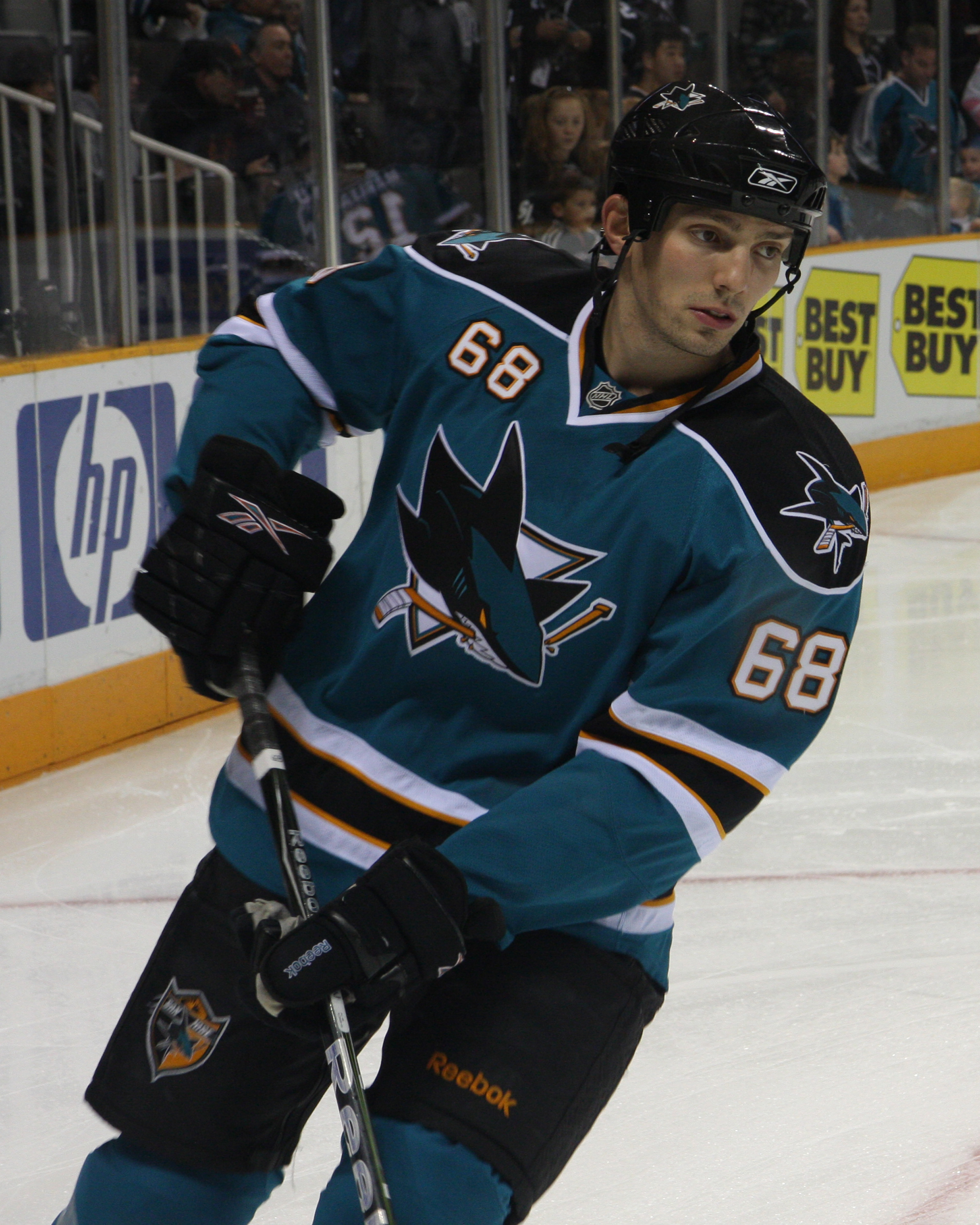
- McLaren with the San Jose Sharks in 2009
- Born: October 29, 1987 (age 38) Winnipeg, Manitoba, Canada
- Height: 6 ft 5 in (196 cm)
- Weight: 250 lb (113 kg; 17 st 12 lb)
- Position: Left wing
- Shot: Left
- Played for: San Jose Sharks; Toronto Maple Leafs
- NHL draft: 203rd overall, 2007; San Jose Sharks
- Playing career: 2008–2016

Frazer William Down McLaren (born October 29, 1987) is a Canadian former professional ice hockey left winger who played in National Hockey League (NHL) for the San Jose Sharks and the Toronto Maple Leafs.

== Playing career ==
McLaren played five seasons of junior hockey in the Western Hockey League, mostly for the Portland Winter Hawks, but playing 48 of his 318 games for the Moose Jaw Warriors following a mid-season trade during the 2007–08 season. He was drafted after his fourth year of junior hockey, being taken in the seventh round of the 2007 NHL entry draft, 203rd overall.

McLaren played a full season for the Worcester Sharks of the American Hockey League in the 2008–09 season, collecting 181 penalty minutes while being used as an enforcer. Despite missing the cut to make the NHL squad at the beginning of the 2009–10 season, McLaren was recalled to play in the San Jose Sharks' second game, making his NHL debut on October 3, 2009. He also scored his first NHL point, coming on a secondary assist of Benn Ferriero's first NHL goal.

On November 29, 2009, McLaren scored his first NHL goal against Roberto Luongo of the Vancouver Canucks. On June 30, 2011, McLaren signed a one-year contract extension with the San Jose Sharks.

During the 2012–13 season, on January 31, 2013, McLaren was claimed off waivers from the Sharks by the Toronto Maple Leafs.

In July 2013, McLaren signed a two-year contract with the Leafs.

During the 2013–14 season, on March 3, 2014, McLaren was placed on waivers by the Toronto Maple Leafs, well into the first season of his new contract with the Leafs. This move was widely seen as an attempt to free up cap space for the return of Dave Bolland, with the hopes that McLaren will clear waivers and join the Toronto Marlies of the American Hockey League.

On August 24, 2015, McLaren signed a one-year contract with the San Jose Sharks, marking his second tenure with the organization.

== Career statistics ==
=== Regular season and playoffs ===
			Regular season					Playoffs
Season	Team	League	GP	G	A	Pts	PIM	GP	G	A	Pts	PIM
2003–04	Portland Winter Hawks	WHL	50	0	3	3	44	1	0	0	0	0
2004–05	Portland Winter Hawks	WHL	71	6	5	11	124	7	0	0	0	10
2005–06	Portland Winter Hawks	WHL	70	12	6	18	194	12	0	2	2	27
2006–07	Portland Winter Hawks	WHL	61	19	12	31	186	—	—	—	—	—
2007–08	Portland Winter Hawks	WHL	18	4	3	7	45	—	—	—	—	—
2007–08	Moose Jaw Warriors	WHL	48	15	18	33	119	6	1	1	2	8
2007–08	Worcester Sharks	AHL	4	0	1	1	17	—	—	—	—	—
2008–09	Worcester Sharks	AHL	75	7	1	8	181	12	1	4	5	50
2009–10	San Jose Sharks	NHL	23	1	5	6	54	—	—	—	—	—
2009–10	Worcester Sharks	AHL	52	4	11	15	148	11	0	0	0	37
2010–11	San Jose Sharks	NHL	9	0	0	0	22	—	—	—	—	—
2010–11	Worcester Sharks	AHL	40	2	2	4	71	—	—	—	—	—
2011–12	Worcester Sharks	AHL	20	0	1	1	73	—	—	—	—	—
2011–12	San Jose Sharks	NHL	7	0	0	0	9	—	—	—	—	—
2012–13	Worcester Sharks	AHL	26	0	1	1	87	—	—	—	—	—
2012–13	San Jose Sharks	NHL	1	0	0	0	0	—	—	—	—	—
2012–13	Toronto Maple Leafs	NHL	35	3	2	5	102	1	0	0	0	2
2013–14	Toronto Maple Leafs	NHL	27	0	0	0	77	—	—	—	—	—
2013–14	Toronto Marlies	AHL	6	0	0	0	39	7	1	1	2	16
2014–15	Toronto Marlies	AHL	22	0	1	1	62	—	—	—	—	—
2015–16	San Jose Barracuda	AHL	14	0	0	0	23	1	0	0	0	2
AHL totals			259	13	18	31	701	31	2	5	7	105
NHL totals			102	4	7	11	264	1	0	0	0	2

=== International ===
Year	Team	Event	GP	G	A	Pts	PIM
2004	Canada Western	U17	5	0	1	1	12
Junior totals			5	0	1	1	12
