= Jason Demers =

Canadian ice hockey player (born 1988)

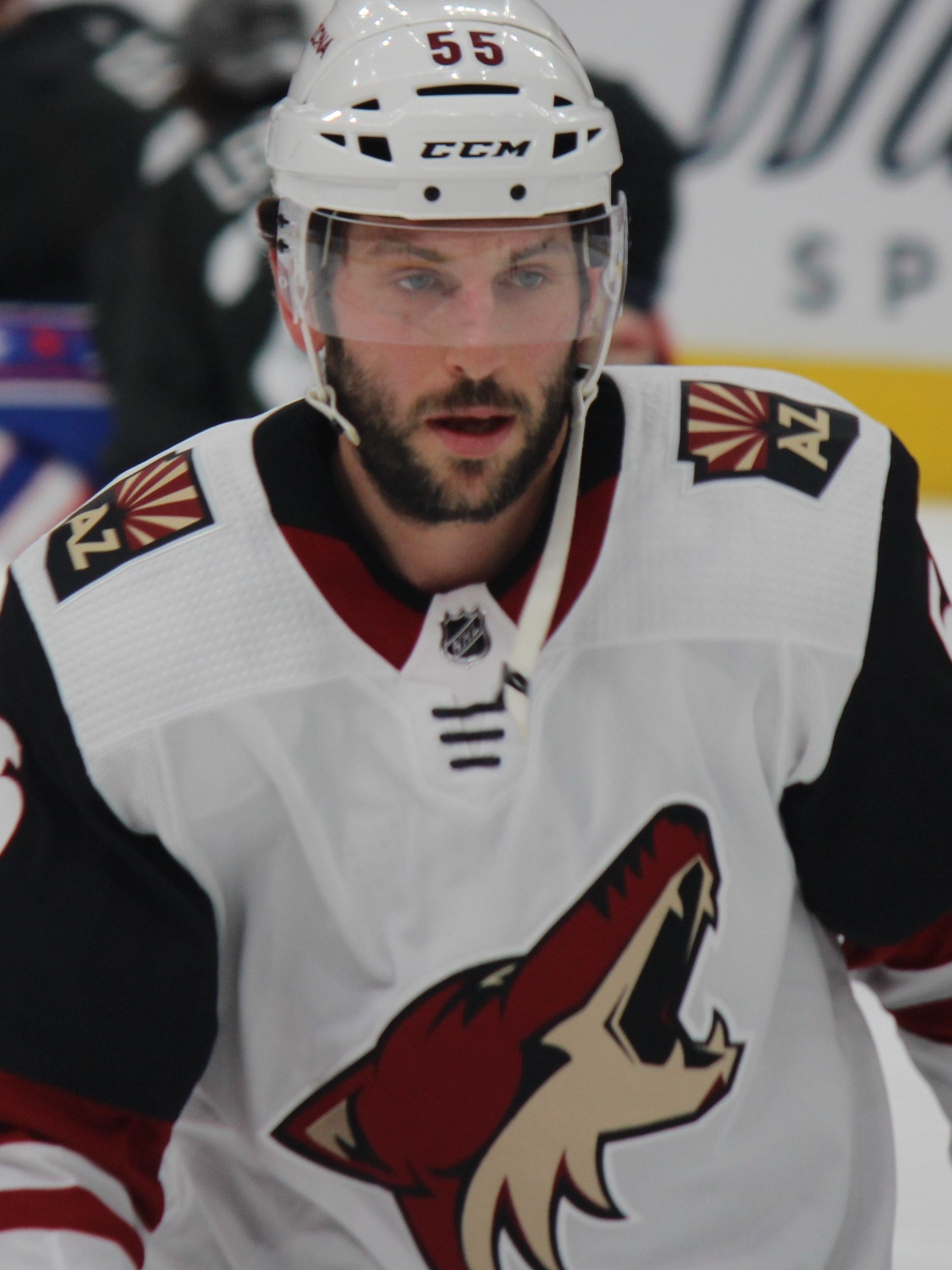
- Demers with the Arizona Coyotes in 2019
- Born: June 9, 1988 (age 38) Dorval, Quebec, Canada
- Height: 6 ft 1 in (185 cm)
- Weight: 195 lb (88 kg; 13 st 13 lb)
- Position: Defence
- Shot: Right
- Played for: San Jose Sharks; Oulun Kärpät; Dallas Stars; Florida Panthers; Arizona Coyotes; Ak Bars Kazan; Edmonton Oilers
- National team: Canada
- NHL draft: 186th overall, 2008; San Jose Sharks
- Playing career: 2008–2023

Jason Demers (born June 9, 1988) is a former Canadian professional ice hockey defenceman. He most recently played for the Bakersfield Condors in the American Hockey League (AHL) while under contract to the Edmonton Oilers of the National Hockey League (NHL). He was drafted by the San Jose Sharks in the seventh round, 186th overall, at the 2008 NHL entry draft.

== Playing career ==
=== Amateur ===
As a youth, Demers played in the 2001 and 2002 Quebec International Pee-Wee Hockey Tournaments with a minor ice hockey team from West Island, Montreal.

Demers played major junior ice hockey in the Quebec Major Junior Hockey League (QMJHL), splitting his time between the Moncton Wildcats and the Victoriaville Tigres. In the 2007–08 season for the Tigres, Demers led the QMJHL in defenceman scoring with 64 points in 67 games. He went undrafted by the NHL until he completed his major junior career in 2008, whereupon he was selected by the San Jose Sharks in the seventh round of the 2008 NHL entry draft, 186th overall.

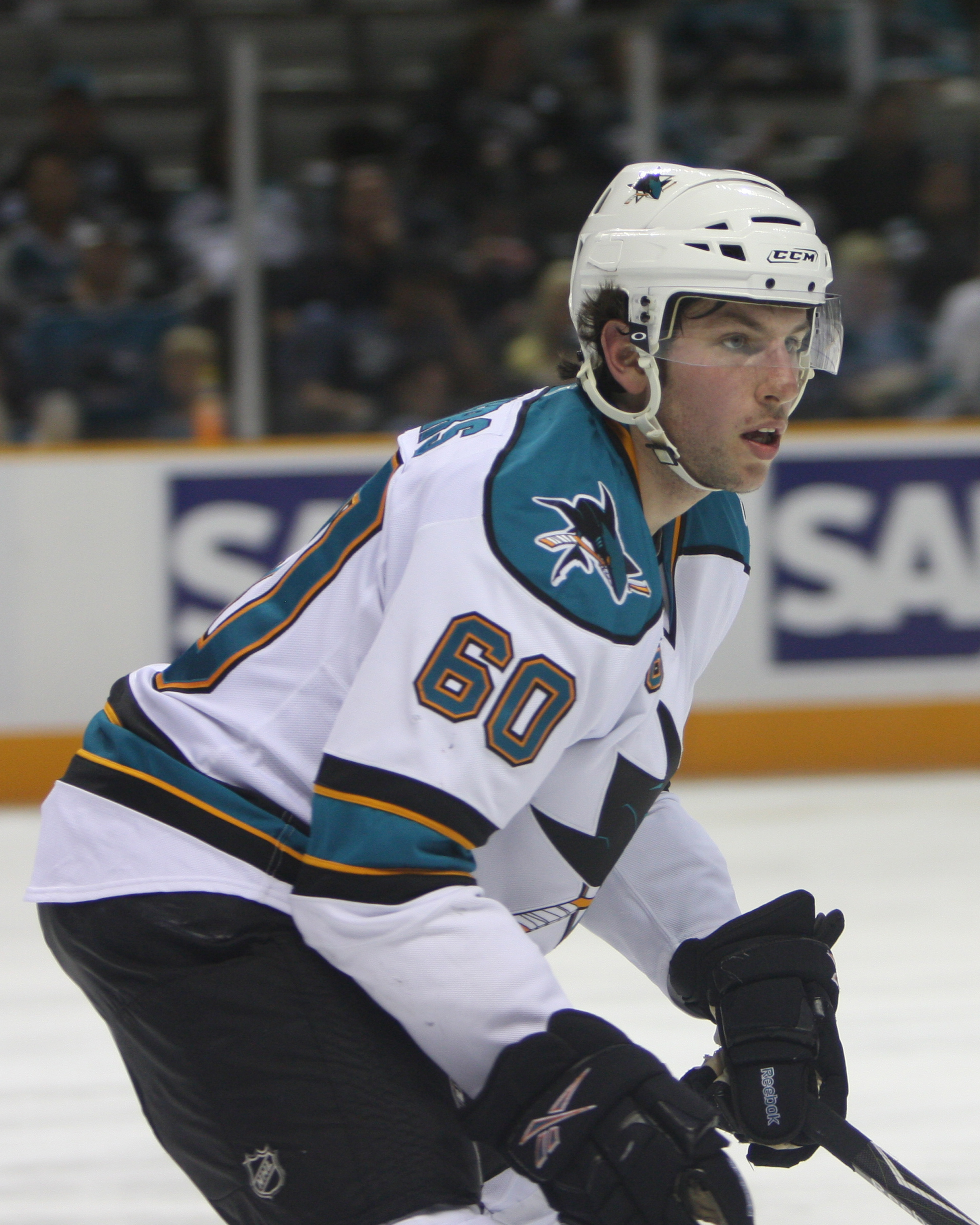
Demers with the San Jose Sharks in 2009.

=== Professional ===
==== San Jose Sharks ====
Demers began his professional career with San Jose's American Hockey League (AHL) affiliate, the Worcester Sharks, scoring 33 points in 78 games in the 2008–09 season. In the team's post-season run, he also played in 12 Calder Cup playoff games for Worcester.

Demers made his NHL debut on October 1, 2009, against the Colorado Avalanche after surviving the final cut in the San Jose Sharks training camp for the 2009–10 season. He scored his first career NHL point in the second game of the season on October 3 against the Anaheim Ducks, earning the primary assist on Benn Ferriero goal, the first of his career. Demers himself scored his first career NHL goal on November 15 against Cristobal Huet of the Chicago Blackhawks. Demers' first multi-goal game came later in the season, on January 30, 2010, where he scored two power-play goals against Josh Harding of the Minnesota Wild. Demers scored his first career Stanley Cup playoff goal against the Chicago Blackhawks on May 16 in the Western Conference Finals, a series the Sharks lost in a four-game sweep.

In Game 7 of the second round of the 2011 playoffs against the Detroit Red Wings, Couture suffered a high ankle sprain, resulting in him missing of the playoffs as the Sharks defeated the Red Wings in seven games for a second consecutive appearance in the Western Conference Finals, this time losing in five games to the Presidents’ Trophy-winning Vancouver Canucks.

On March 28, 2013, in a 2–0 victory against the Detroit Red Wings, Demers suffered a head injury after suffering a hit from Cory Emmerton; he was replaced on defence by forward Brent Burns for the Sharks' next game, which was against the Phoenix Coyotes on March 30.

==== Dallas Stars ====
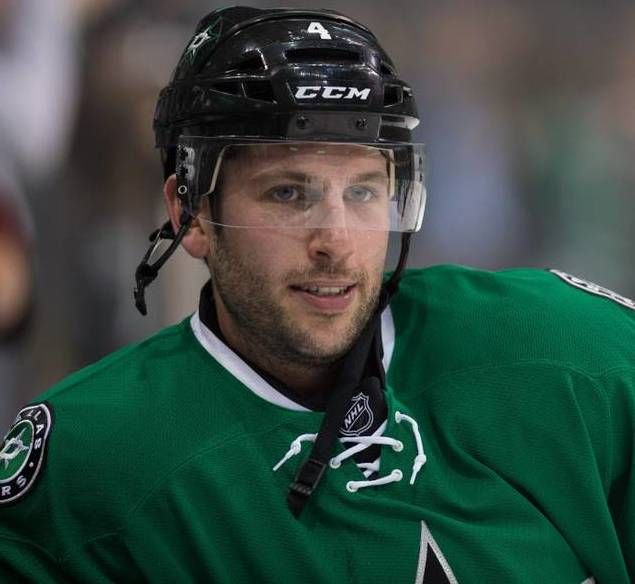
Demers with the Dallas Stars in 2015

On November 21, 2014, just over one month into the 2014–15 season, Demers was traded to the Dallas Stars, along with a third-round pick, in exchange for defenceman Brenden Dillon.

==== Florida Panthers ====
On July 2, 2016, Demers left the Stars organization as a free agent and signed a five-year deal worth $22.5 million with the Florida Panthers. In his lone season with the club, Demers recorded 9 goals and 28 points in 81 games.

==== Arizona Coyotes ====
On September 17, 2017, Demers was traded to the Arizona Coyotes in exchange for former teammate, Jamie McGinn.

==== Ak Bars Kazan ====
Following his fourth season within the Coyotes organization and having played 12 years in the NHL, Demers entered the 2021–22 season as an unsigned free agent. On December 20, 2021, Demers opted to continue his career abroad, agreeing to a one-year contract for the remainder of the season with Russian club Ak Bars Kazan of the KHL.

==== Edmonton Oilers ====
As a free agent after his contract with Ak Bars, Demers went un-signed over the summer. With aspirations to resume his career in the NHL, Demers accepted an invitation to join the Edmonton Oilers training camp and pre-season in preparation for the 2022–23 season. Remaining with the Oilers through the entire pre-season, Demers was released from his tryout from the Oilers, however joined the Oilers' AHL affiliate, the Bakersfield Condors, on a professional tryout on October 11, 2022. Registering 9 assists through 23 games with the Condors, Demers secured a one-year, two-way contract with the Edmonton Oilers on December 18, 2022. On April 6, 2023, with Oilers' blueline depleted, Demers was called up to the NHL and played in a solitary game, marking his 700th career game on April 8.

== International play ==
Medal record

Representing Canada

Ice hockey

World Championships
Silver medal – second place	2017 Germany/France	

Demers first played for Team Canada during the NHL Lockout at the 2013 Spengler Cup. Demers was added to Team Canada for his first IIHF-sanctioned tournament at the 2017 World Championships in Germany/France. In 10 games, Demers went scoreless as Canada suffered a 2-1 shootout defeat in the final against Sweden on May 21, 2017, to finish with the Silver Medal.

In January 2022, Demers was selected to play for Team Canada at the 2022 Winter Olympics.

== Personal life ==
Demers was born in Dorval, Quebec, the son of Guylaine and Darrell Demers. In the 2010s, he discovered that he has Jewish ancestry on his father's side; upon his realization, Demers stated, "[Being Jewish] is on my father’s side of the family tree. It all came as a little bit of a surprise, but we welcomed it... Obviously, having that new-found heritage makes me curious."

== Career statistics ==
=== Regular season and playoffs ===
			Regular season					Playoffs
Season	Team	League	GP	G	A	Pts	PIM	GP	G	A	Pts	PIM
2004–05	Moncton Wildcats	QMJHL	25	0	1	1	10	—	—	—	—	—
2005–06	Moncton Wildcats	QMJHL	21	1	3	4	15	—	—	—	—	—
2005–06	Victoriaville Tigres	QMJHL	33	2	13	15	58	5	0	2	2	10
2006–07	Victoriaville Tigres	QMJHL	69	5	19	24	98	6	0	0	0	2
2007–08	Victoriaville Tigres	QMJHL	67	9	55	64	91	6	1	5	6	6
2008–09	Worcester Sharks	AHL	78	2	31	33	54	12	0	4	4	6
2009–10	San Jose Sharks	NHL	51	4	17	21	21	15	1	4	5	8
2009–10	Worcester Sharks	AHL	25	4	13	17	24	—	—	—	—	—
2010–11	San Jose Sharks	NHL	75	2	22	24	28	13	2	1	3	8
2011–12	San Jose Sharks	NHL	57	4	9	13	22	3	0	0	0	2
2012–13	Kärpät	SM-l	30	5	16	21	18	—	—	—	—	—
2012–13	San Jose Sharks	NHL	22	1	2	3	10	1	0	0	0	2
2013–14	San Jose Sharks	NHL	75	5	29	34	30	7	0	1	1	12
2014–15	San Jose Sharks	NHL	20	0	3	3	8	—	—	—	—	—
2014–15	Dallas Stars	NHL	61	5	17	22	63	—	—	—	—	—
2015–16	Dallas Stars	NHL	62	7	16	23	72	13	0	3	3	8
2016–17	Florida Panthers	NHL	81	9	19	28	53	—	—	—	—	—
2017–18	Arizona Coyotes	NHL	69	6	14	20	37	—	—	—	—	—
2018–19	Arizona Coyotes	NHL	35	2	6	8	12	—	—	—	—	—
2018–19	Tucson Roadrunners	AHL	1	0	1	1	0	—	—	—	—	—
2019–20	Arizona Coyotes	NHL	50	0	11	11	25	9	0	4	4	8
2020–21	Arizona Coyotes	NHL	41	0	4	4	26	—	—	—	—	—
2021–22	Ak Bars Kazan	KHL	5	0	1	1	4	4	0	1	1	4
2022–23	Bakersfield Condors	AHL	57	0	18	18	87	2	0	0	0	4
2022–23	Edmonton Oilers	NHL	1	0	0	0	0	—	—	—	—	—
NHL totals			700	45	169	214	407	61	3	13	16	48
Liiga totals			30	5	16	21	18	—	—	—	—	—
KHL totals			5	0	1	1	4	4	0	1	1	4

=== International ===
Year	Team	Event	Result	GP	G	A	Pts	PIM
2017	Canada	WC	2nd place, silver medalist(s)	10	0	0	0	4
2022	Canada	OG	6th	5	0	2	2	0
Senior totals				15	0	2	2	4

== See also ==
- List of select Jewish ice hockey players
