= Dimitri Pätzold =

Kazakhstani-German ice hockey player

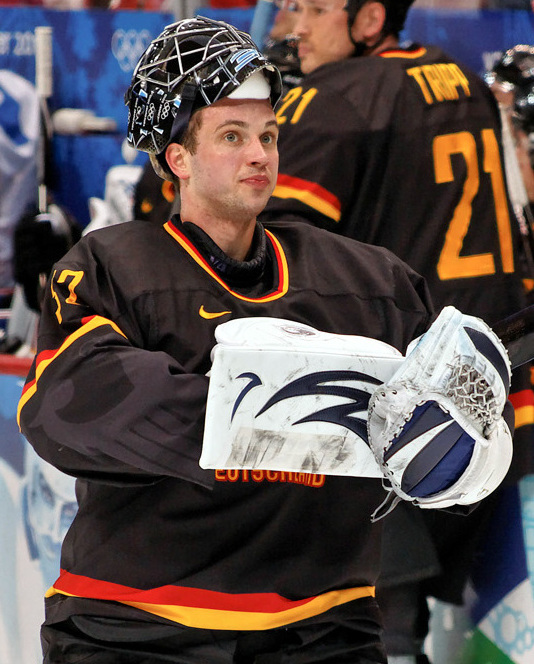
- Pätzold with Germany at the 2010 Winter Olympics
- Born: 3 February 1983 (age 43) Ust-Kamenogorsk, Kazakh SSR, Soviet Union
- Height: 6 ft 0 in (183 cm)
- Weight: 194 lb (88 kg; 13 st 12 lb)
- Position: Goaltender
- Catches: Left
- DEL2 team Former teams: EV Landshut; Kölner Haie; Adler Mannheim; San Jose Sharks; HC Vityaz Podolsk; ERC Ingolstadt; Straubing Tigers; Hannover Scorpions; Schwenninger Wild Wings; Krefeld Pinguine
- National team: Germany
- NHL draft: 107th overall, 2001; San Jose Sharks
- Playing career: 2000–present

Dimitri Andreevich Pätzold (Russian: Дми́трий Андре́евич Пе́тцольд; born 3 February 1983) is a Kazakh-born German professional ice hockey goaltender currently playing for EV Landshut of the DEL2. He has also played in the Kontinental Hockey League. Due to his Russian German descent he also holds Russian citizenship. Internationally Pätzold has represented the German national team at several tournaments, including the 2010 Winter Olympics.

== Playing career ==
Pätzold was drafted 107th overall in the 2001 NHL entry draft by the San Jose Sharks. His previous professional teams include Kölner Haie, Adler Mannheim, the San Jose Sharks (with their AHL teams the Cleveland Barons and later the Worcester Sharks), ERC Ingolstadt, and the Straubing Tigers.

After playing with the Straubing Tigers, Pätzold signed a contract with the Hannover Scorpions on 12 April 2011. With the forfeit of the Scorpions' DEL license two years later, Pätzold stayed in the DEL by joining the newcomer Schwenninger Wild Wings on 5 August 2013.

== International play ==
Pätzold has played for the German national team at multiple tournaments, both at the junior and senior level. At the senior level he has played in the 2007, 2008, 2009, 2011 World Championships, and the 2010 Winter Olympics.

== Career statistics ==
=== Regular season and playoffs ===
			Regular season										Playoffs
Season	Team	League	GP	W	L	T	OTL	MIN	GA	SO	GAA	SV%	GP	W	L	MIN	GA	SO	GAA	SV%
1999–00	Kölner EC U20	GER-U20	38	—	—	—	—	2131	73	0	2.06	—	—	—	—	—	—	—	—	—
1999–00	Kölner Haie-2	GER-4	16	—	—	—	—	896	58	0	3.88	—	—	—	—	—	—	—	—	—
2000–01	EV Duisburg	GER-3	6	—	—	—	—	360	17	0	2.83	—	—	—	—	—	—	—	—	—
2000–01	Erding Jets	GER-2	24	—	—	—	—	1378	89	0	3.88	—	—	—	—	—	—	—	—	—
2001–02	Kölner Haie	DEL	7	—	—	—	—	260	16	0	3.69	—	—	—	—	—	—	—	—	—
2001–02	EV Duisburg	GER-2	6	—	—	—	—	360	17	0	2.83	—	—	—	—	—	—	—	—	—
2002–03	Adler Mannheim	DEL	15	—	—	—	—	817	35	0	2.57	—	2	—	—	34	2	0	3.53	.867
2003–04	Cleveland Barons	AHL	27	10	15	0	—	1457	70	3	2.88	.915	—	—	—	—	—	—	—	—
2003–04	Johnstown Chiefs	ECHL	8	7	0	0	—	443	20	0	2.71	.908	1	0	1	59	2	0	2.02	.938
2004–05	Cleveland Barons	AHL	41	18	16	5	—	2418	104	1	2.58	.911	—	—	—	—	—	—	—	—
2005–06	Cleveland Barons	AHL	33	10	21	—	0	1876	124	0	3.97	.869	—	—	—	—	—	—	—	—
2006–07	Worcester Sharks	AHL	24	10	8	—	3	1378	77	0	3.35	.888	4	2	1	256	8	0	1.87	.921
2006–07	Fresno Falcons	ECHL	4	2	2	—	0	239	8	0	2.01	.930	—	—	—	—	—	—	—	—
2007–08	San Jose Sharks	NHL	3	0	0	—	0	44	4	0	5.51	.800	—	—	—	—	—	—	—	—
2007–08	Worcester Sharks	AHL	21	7	10	—	3	1184	56	1	2.84	.898	—	—	—	—	—	—	—	—
2008–09	Vityaz Chekhov	KHL	1	0	1	—	0	52	5	0	5.80	.828	—	—	—	—	—	—	—	—
2008–09	Hannover Scorpions	DEL	26	18	7	—	0	1453	68	0	2.81	.913	10	6	4	625	24	1	2.30	.917
2009–10	ERC Ingolstadt	DEL	54	23	21	—	0	3232	167	2	3.10	.903	10	5	5	612	31	1	3.04	.902
2010–11	Straubing Tigers	DEL	43	17	25	—	0	2540	121	1	2.86	.904	—	—	—	—	—	—	—	—
2011–12	Hannover Scorpions	DEL	48	17	29	—	0	2826	138	3	2.93	.909	—	—	—	—	—	—	—	—
2012–13	Hannover Scorpions	DEL	42	21	21	—	0	2478	107	4	2.59	.924	—	—	—	—	—	—	—	—
2013–14	Schwenningen Wild Wings	DEL	50	17	32	—	0	2956	163	2	3.31	.909	—	—	—	—	—	—	—	—
2014–15	Schwenningen Wild Wings	DEL	41	11	28	—	0	2261	122	0	3.24	.910	—	—	—	—	—	—	—	—
2015–16	Schwenningen Wild Wings	DEL	28	9	16	—	0	1519	87	0	3.44	.909	—	—	—	—	—	—	—	—
2016–17	Straubing Tigers	DEL	26	8	15	—	0	1382	68	2	2.95	.898	—	—	—	—	—	—	—	—
2017–18	Straubing Tigers	DEL	6	0	5	—	0	279	11	1	2.37	.926	—	—	—	—	—	—	—	—
2017–18	Krefeld Pinguine	DEL	21	4	16	—	0	1224	68	1	3.33	.904	—	—	—	—	—	—	—	—
2018–19	Krefeld Pinguine	DEL	39	19	17	—	0	2177	104	0	2.87	.891	—	—	—	—	—	—	—	—
2019–20	Krefeld Pinguine	DEL	18	2	15	—	0	971	60	0	3.71	.890	—	—	—	—	—	—	—	—
2019–20	EV Landshut	DEL2	7	1	0	—	0	346	24	0	4.16	.855	—	—	—	—	—	—	—	—
NHL totals			3	0	0	—	0	44	4	0	5.51	.800	—	—	—	—	—	—	—	—

=== International ===
Year	Team	Event	GP	W	L	T	MIN	GA	SO	GAA	SV%
2000	Germany	U18	6	2	3	1	360	16	1	2.67	.927
2001	Germany	U18	6	3	2	1	360	20	0	3.33	.908
2001	Germany	WJC-I	4	3	1	0	240	6	0	1.50	.933
2002	Germany	WJC-I	4	4	0	0	240	4	0	1.00	.955
2003	Germany	WJC	5	1	4	0	246	21	0	5.13	.870
2007	Germany	WC	3	2	1	0	180	11	0	3.67	.841
2008	Germany	WC	3	1	2	0	178	13	0	4.38	.884
2009	Germany	WC	6	1	5	0	358	15	0	2.52	.904
2010	Germany	OLY	1	0	1	0	60	5	0	5.00	.857
2011	Germany	WC	1	1	0	0	60	3	0	3.00	.921
Junior totals			29	13	10	2	1446	67	1	2.78	—
Senior totals			14	5	9	0	836	47	0	3.37	.886
