= Mike Iggulden =

Canadian ice hockey player

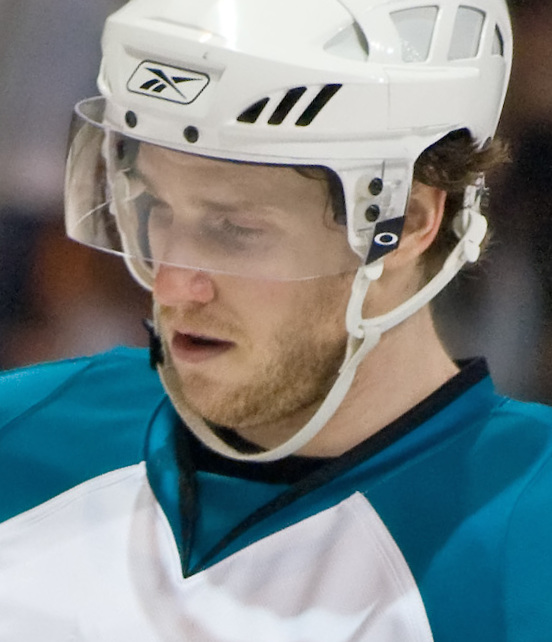
- Born: November 9, 1982 (age 42); St. Catharines, Ontario, Canada
- Height: 6 ft 3 in (191 cm)
- Weight: 220 lb (100 kg; 15 st 10 lb)
- Position: Centre
- Shot: Right
- Played for: San Jose Sharks; New York Islanders; Dinamo Riga; Växjö Lakers HC; Rögle BK; Vityaz Podolsk; KHL Medveščak Zagreb; Kölner Haie; Augsburger Panther
- NHL draft: Undrafted
- Playing career: 2005–2016

Michael Brian Iggulden /ˈɪɡəldɛn/ (born November 9, 1982, in St. Catharines, Ontario) is a Canadian retired professional ice hockey centre who played in the National Hockey League (NHL) with the San Jose Sharks and the New York Islanders.

== Playing career ==
Undrafted, and after five seasons playing for Canada's Ridley College prep school, Iggulden came to Cornell University in 2001, where he enrolled in Cornell's school of hotel executive administration management studies. Iggulden, Mike's last name, is British. He played four seasons for the Big Red before turning professional, signing with the AHL's Rochester Americans at the end of the 2004–05 season.

The San Jose Sharks invited Iggulden to their training camp in September 2005 and, after he became one of the most consistent performers for their AHL farm team at the time, the Cleveland Barons, signed him to a two-year contract on January 16, 2006. Iggulden made his NHL debut in the 2007–08 season with the Sharks on February 18, 2008, in what would be his only game with the Sharks.

On July 3, 2008, Iggulden was signed as a free agent by the New York Islanders to a one-year deal. Iggulden, on his Islanders debut, scored his first 2 NHL points on assists to Sean Bergenheim, in a 7–3 victory, against the New Jersey Devils on March 7, 2009. On March 12, Iggulden scored his first NHL goal against the Montreal Canadiens, tying the game at 1 to 1.

On July 10, 2009, Iggulden signed with Dinamo Riga of the Kontinental Hockey League. In the 2009-10 season, Iggulden enjoyed a successful debut season, registering 33 points in 55 games to help Dinamo reach the playoffs.

On July 16, 2010, Iggulden signed a lucrative one-year contract with the SCL Tigers of the Swiss National League A (NLA).

On June 12, 2011, Iggulden signed a one-year contract with the Växjö Lakers Hockey of the Swedish Elitserien (SEL). After scoring 34 points in 41 games for the Lakers, Iggulden chose to remain in the SEL, moving to fellow club Rögle BK on June 20, 2012.

After spending the 2014–15 season with German club, Kölner Haie, leading the club with 30 points in 49 games, Iggulden opted to remain in the DEL, signing a one-year deal with the Augsburger Panther on August 16, 2015. He made 42 DEL appearances for Augsburg, tallying 28 points. After the season, Iggulden turned down the club's offer to extend his contract and in May 2016, announced the end of his playing career.

== Career statistics ==
			Regular season					Playoffs
Season	Team	League	GP	G	A	Pts	PIM	GP	G	A	Pts	PIM
2001–02	Cornell University	ECAC	30	1	3	4	6	—	—	—	—	—
2002–03	Cornell University	ECAC	15	0	2	2	19	—	—	—	—	—
2003–04	Cornell University	ECAC	30	2	8	10	10	—	—	—	—	—
2004–05	Cornell University	ECAC	35	10	8	18	8	—	—	—	—	—
2004–05	Rochester Americans	AHL	6	1	0	1	7	—	—	—	—	—
2005–06	Cleveland Barons	AHL	77	22	26	48	57	—	—	—	—	—
2006–07	Worcester Sharks	AHL	73	30	27	57	55	6	3	3	6	0
2007–08	Worcester Sharks	AHL	78	29	37	66	63	—	—	—	—	—
2007–08	San Jose Sharks	NHL	1	0	0	0	0	—	—	—	—	—
2008–09	Bridgeport Sound Tigers	AHL	72	25	41	66	42	2	1	2	3	0
2008–09	New York Islanders	NHL	11	1	4	5	4	—	—	—	—	—
2009–10	Dinamo Riga	KHL	55	13	20	33	44	5	0	0	0	2
2010–11	SCL Tigers	NLA	50	12	28	40	14	4	0	2	2	4
2011–12	Växjö Lakers	SEL	41	13	21	34	12	—	—	—	—	—
2012–13	Rögle BK	SEL	55	13	17	30	38	—	—	—	—	—
2013–14	Vityaz Podolsk	KHL	25	4	7	11	10	—	—	—	—	—
2013–14	KHL Medveščak Zagreb	KHL	6	0	1	1	0	1	0	0	0	0
2014–15	Kölner Haie	DEL	49	14	16	30	24	—	—	—	—	—
2015–16	Augsburger Panther	DEL	42	12	16	28	46	—	—	—	—	—
NHL totals			12	1	4	5	4	—	—	—	—	—
KHL totals			86	17	28	45	54	6	0	0	0	2
