= Worcester Sharks =

AHL ice hockey team

- City: Worcester, Massachusetts
- League: American Hockey League (AHL)
- Conference: Eastern Conference
- Division: Atlantic Division
- Founded: 1996
- Operated: 2006–2015
- Home arena: DCU Center
- Colors: Pacific teal, black, white, burnt orange
- Owners: San Jose Sports & Entertainment Enterprises (Hasso Plattner, Governor)
- Media: Worcester Telegram & Gazette; WTAG AM 580 & FM 94.9; Charter TV3
- Affiliates: San Jose Sharks (2006–2015)

Franchise history
- 1996–2001: Kentucky Thoroughblades
- 2001–2006: Cleveland Barons
- 2006–2015: Worcester Sharks
- 2015–present: San Jose Barracuda

The Worcester Sharks were a professional ice hockey team in the American Hockey League (AHL) that played from 2006 to 2015. Affiliated with the National Hockey League's San Jose Sharks and located in Worcester, Massachusetts, the Sharks played their home games at the DCU Center.

== History ==
On November 9, 2004, the St. Louis Blues announced the sale of the Worcester IceCats to the owners of their ECHL affiliate, the Peoria Rivermen. The new owners moved the franchise to Peoria, Illinois, for the 2005–06 season. Shocked by the loss of the IceCats, the people of Worcester bargained with several National Hockey League (NHL) franchises, trying to bring hockey back to the city. On January 6, 2006, the San Jose Sharks announced they were moving their AHL affiliate, the Cleveland Barons, to Worcester, Massachusetts, and the Worcester Sharks played their first home game on October 14, 2006, in front of a sold-out 7,230 fans in a shootout loss to the Portland Pirates. The Sharks qualified for the playoffs in their inaugural season, but were eliminated in six games by the Manchester Monarchs in the first round.

The Sharks' main rivals were the Providence Bruins, the genesis of which dates back to IceCats' days.

The Sharks were well represented in the 2010 Winter Olympics held in Vancouver, with former Sharks Joe Pavelski (played for the United States), Douglas Murray (represented Sweden) along with the goaltending tandem from the franchise's first two years with Thomas Greiss and Dimitri Patzold played for Germany.

On November 1, 2009, head coach Roy Sommer became only the fourth coach in AHL history to record 400 wins. On January 14, 2011, Sommer was behind the Sharks bench for his 1,000th regular-season game as an AHL head coach, becoming just the fourth man in AHL history to reach that milestone. On February 11, 2012, Sommer became the fourth coach in AHL history to record 500 wins with a 3–2 shootout win over the Hershey Bears.

=== Relocation to San Jose ===
On January 26, 2015, it was reported that the Sharks would move to San Jose and share SAP Center at San Jose with their parent club, the San Jose Sharks. These reports were confirmed with the Sharks' official announcement on January 29. On April 2, 2015, the team was announced as the San Jose Barracuda.

Worcester did not initially receive an ECHL team to replace the relocated AHL team, unlike the other markets with relocated AHL teams in 2015, such as Manchester, New Hampshire, Norfolk, Virginia, and Glens Falls, New York. On February 8, 2016, the ECHL announced Worcester would be home to an expansion team, set to begin play for the 2017–18 season. The team is owned by Cliff Rucker, with Toby O'Brien serving as president and general manager. The team name was revealed on April 3 to be the Worcester Railers.

This market was previously served by:

- Worcester Warriors (1954–1956) - members of the Eastern Hockey League (1954–55) and Atlantic Hockey League (1955–56)
- Worcester IceCats (1994–2005) - affiliated with the St. Louis Blues

== Broadcasters ==
Radio

- Eric Lindquist - Play-by-Play

Television

- Eric Lindquist - Play-by-Play
- Kevin Shea - Color Commentary

== Season-by-season results ==
Calder Cup champions	Conference champions	Division champions	League leader

Records as of April 21, 2015.

Regular Season											Playoffs				
Season	Games	Won	Lost	OTL	SOL	Points	PCT	Goals for	Goals against	Standing	Year	1st round	2nd round	3rd round	Finals
2006–07	80	41	28	3	8	93	.581	247	244	4th, Atlantic	2007	L, 2–4, MCH	—	—	—
2007–08	80	32	37	5	6	75	.469	216	258	6th, Atlantic	2008	Out of playoffs			
2008–09	80	42	35	1	2	87	.544	223	223	4th, Atlantic	2009	W, 4–2, HFD	L, 2–4, PRO	—	—
2009–10	80	49	25	3	3	104	.650	275	239	1st, Atlantic	2010	W, 4–1, LOW	L, 2–4, MCH	—	—
2010–11	80	36	31	4	9	85	.531	210	245	4th, Atlantic	2011	Out of playoffs			
2011–12	76	31	33	4	8	74	.487	199	218	5th, Atlantic	2012	Out of playoffs			
2012–13	76	31	34	4	7	73	.480	191	228	4th, Atlantic	2013	Out of playoffs			
2013–14	76	36	34	4	2	78	.513	189	226	4th, Atlantic	2014	Out of playoffs			
2014–15	76	41	29	4	2	91	.579	224	198	3rd, Atlantic	2015	L, 1-3, HER	—	—	—
Totals	704	339	286	32	47	760	.537	1974	2079			4 Playoff Appearances			

== Players ==
=== Team captains ===
- Graham Mink, 2007–2008
- Ryan Vesce, 2008–2010
- Jay Leach, 2010–2011
- Mike Moore, 2011–2012
- John McCarthy, 2012–2013
- Rob Davison, 2013–2014
- Bryan Lerg, 2014–2015

=== All-Star Classic representatives ===
- Mathieu Darche, 2007 Canadian
- Mike Iggulden, 2008 Canadian
- Derek Joslin, 2009 Canadian
- Ryan Vesce, 2009 PlanetUSA
- Logan Couture, 2010 Canadian
- Alex Stalock, 2010 PlanetUSA
- Justin Braun, 2011 Eastern
- Jonathan Cheechoo, 2011 Eastern
- Matt Irwin, 2012 Eastern
- Bracken Kearns, 2013 Eastern
- Matt Taormina, 2015 Eastern

=== Notable alumni ===
List of Worcester Sharks alumni who played in the National Hockey League:

- Riley Armstrong
- Steve Bernier
- Justin Braun
- Adam Burish
- Joe Callahan
- Matt Carle
- Tom Cavanagh
- Jonathan Cheechoo
- Logan Couture
- Mathieu Darche
- Rob Davison
- Aaron Dell
- Dylan DeMelo
- Jason Demers
- Andrew Desjardins
- Scott Ferguson
- Benn Ferriero
- Barclay Goodrow
- Josh Gorges
- Thomas Greiss
- Dwight Helminen
- Tomas Hertl
- Carter Hutton
- Mike Iggulden
- Matt Irwin
- Derek Joslin
- Melker Karlsson
- Lukas Kaspar
- Tyler Kennedy
- Tim Kennedy
- Claude Lemieux
- Brandon Mashinter
- John McCarthy
- Jamie McGinn
- Frazer McLaren
- Kyle McLaren
- Torrey Mitchell
- Mike Moore
- Mirco Mueller
- Douglas Murray
- Sandis Ozolinsh
- Dimitri Patzold
- Joe Pavelski
- Tomas Plihal
- Devin Setoguchi
- James Sheppard
- Alex Stalock
- Brad Staubitz
- Matt Tennyson
- Patrick Traverse
- Ryan Vesce
- Marc-Edouard Vlasic
- Tommy Wingels
- Steven Zalewski

== Player records ==
=== All-time regular season leaders ===
- Games Played: Nick Petrecki, John McCarthy, 277
- Goals: John McCarthy, 63
- Assists: Tom Cavanagh, 92
- Points: John McCarthy, 151
- PIM: Frazer McLaren, 577
- Wins: Thomas Greiss, 74
- Losses: Thomas Greiss, 60
- Shutouts: Alex Stalock, Aaron Dell 4
- Lowest GAA : Aaron Dell, 2.06

=== Individual regular season ===
- Most Goals: Mathieu Darche, 35 (2006–07)
- Most Assists: Danny Groulx, 52 (2009–10)
- Most Points: Mathieu Darche, 80 (2006–07)
- Most Penalty Minutes: Matt Pelech, 238 (2012–13)
- Most Power-Play Goals: Mathieu Darche, 16 (2006–07)
- Most Shorthanded Goals: Ryan Vesce, 3 (2008–09)
- Most Appearances: Alex Stalock, 61 (2009–10)
- Most Minutes Played: Alex Stalock, 3,534 (2009–10)
- Most Wins: Alex Stalock, 39 (2009–10)
- Most Losses: Thomas Greiss, 24 (2008–09)
- Most Shutouts: Alex Stalock, 4 (2009–10) Aaron Dell, 4 (2014-15)
- Lowest GAA (min. 25 games): Aaron Dell, 2.06 (2014–15)
- Highest Save Percentage (min. 25 games): Aaron Dell, .927 (2014–15)

=== All-time playoff leaders ===
- Games Played: 14 players tied, 12
- Goals: Patrick Traverse/Jamie McGinn/Andrew Desjardins, 4
- Assists: Riley Armstrong, 11
- Points: Riley Armstrong, 14

=== Franchise firsts ===
- First Game & Win: October 6, 2006. Worcester Sharks 4, Portland Pirates 3 [SO]
- Franchise First Goal: October 6, 2006. Worcester Sharks 4, Portland Pirates 3 [SO]. Goal scored by Mathieu Darche
- Franchise First Shutout: January 11, 2008 by Dimitri Patzold. Worcester Sharks 3, Providence Bruins 0.
- Franchise First Hat Trick: December 22, 2006 by Mathieu Darche. Worcester Sharks 6, Manchester Monarchs 4.
- Franchise Largest Crowd: February 24, 2012. 10,170 Providence Bruins 5, Worcester Sharks 3.

=== Franchise lasts ===
- Last Game: May 1, 2015. Worcester Sharks 4, Hershey Bears 10 [Game 4, Round 1 of Playoffs]
- Last Win: April 29, 2015. Worcester Sharks 4, Hershey Bears 1 [Game 3, Round 1 of Playoffs]
- Franchise Last Goal: May 1, 2015. Worcester Sharks 4, Hershey Bears 10 [Game 4, Round 1 of Playoffs] Goal scored by Matt Taormina assisted by Oleksuk, Langlois.
- Franchise Last Shutout: April 7, 2015 by Aaron Dell. Worcester Sharks 1, Portland Pirates 0
- Franchise Last Hat Trick: February 27, 2015 by Evan Trupp. Saint John's IceCaps 3, Worcester Sharks 6
- Franchise Last Home Game: April 25, 2015 Hershey Bears 3, Worcester Sharks 1 [Game 2, Round 1 of Playoffs] Attendance:4,045

=== Franchise scoring leaders ===
These are the top-ten point-scorers in franchise history. Note: Pos = Position; GP = Games played; G = Goals; A = Assists; Pts = Points;

Player	Pos	GP	G	A	Pts
John McCarthy	LW	277	63	88	151
Dan DaSilva	RW	239	60	84	144
Tom Cavanagh	C	202	46	92	138
Steven Zalewski	C	210	41	87	128
Lukas Kaspar	LW	216	46	79	125
Mike Iggulden	C	151	59	64	123
Graham Mink	RW	132	55	63	118
Riley Armstrong	RW	208	59	53	112
Brandon Mashinter	LW	236	54	54	108
Benn Ferriero	C	121	44	59	103

== Head coaches ==
- Roy Sommer, 2006–2015
