= John McCarthy (ice hockey) =

American ice hockey player and coach

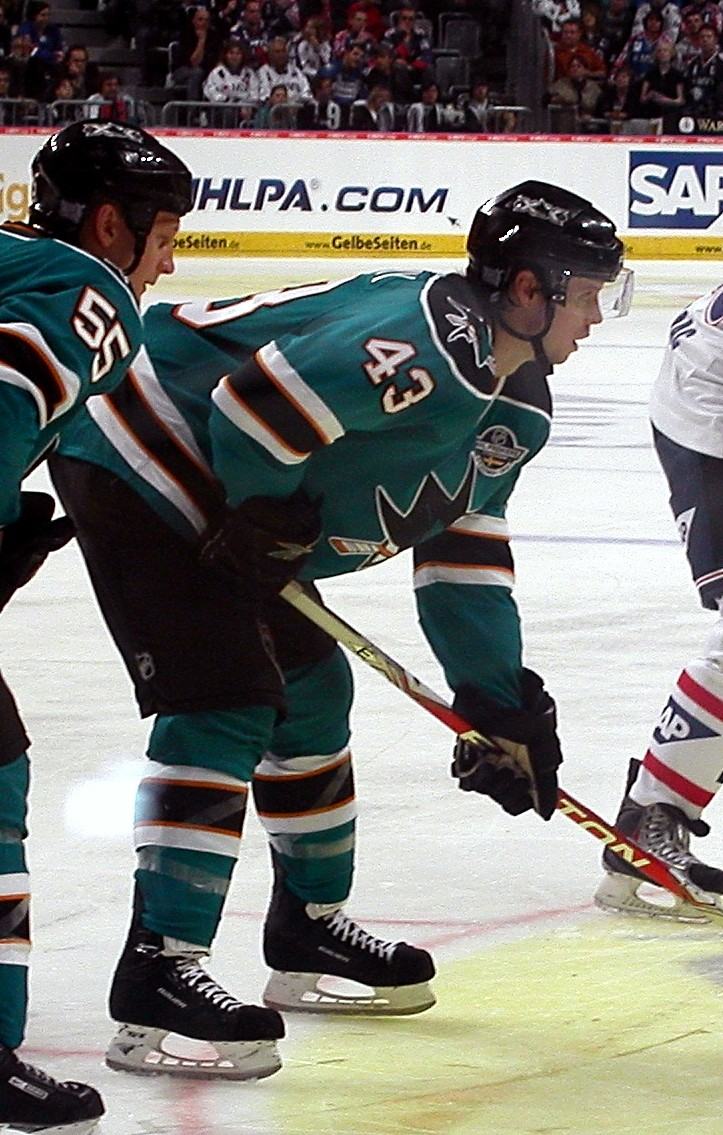
- McCarthy with the San Jose Sharks in 2010
- Born: August 9, 1986 (age 39) Boston, Massachusetts, U.S.
- Height: 6 ft 1 in (185 cm)
- Weight: 195 lb (88 kg; 13 st 13 lb)
- Position: Left wing
- Shot: Left
- Played for: San Jose Sharks
- National team: United States
- NHL draft: 202nd overall, 2006; San Jose Sharks
- Playing career: 2009–2019
- Coaching career: 2019–present

John McCarthy (born August 9, 1986) is an American ice hockey coach and former left winger who currently is the head coach for the San Jose Barracuda in the American Hockey League (AHL). He formerly played with the San Jose Sharks of the National Hockey League (NHL).

== Playing career ==
McCarthy played the 2004–05 season with the Des Moines Buccaneers of the United States Hockey League. He then played collegiate hockey with Boston University in the Hockey East before he was drafted by the San Jose Sharks, 202nd overall in the 2006 NHL entry draft.

McCarthy made his NHL debut on January 9, 2010, and earned his first NHL point on October 21, 2010 against the Colorado Avalanche, by assisting Scott Nichol to score a game-tying goal at the end of the first period. His first NHL goal was scored the next game, on October 23, against Nikolai Khabibulin of the Edmonton Oilers.

In the 2013–14 season, his fifth within the Sharks organization, McCarthy split the season between Worcester and San Jose, scoring 1 goal and assist in 36 games.

On July 4, 2014, McCarthy signed as a free agent to a one-year, two-way contract with the St. Louis Blues. On January 14, 2015, the St. Louis Blues loaned McCarthy back to the Worcester Sharks in exchange for Adam Burish to play for the Blues' AHL affiliate the Chicago Wolves.

On July 1, 2015, McCarthy returned to the San Jose Sharks in full, signing a one-year, two-way contract as a free agent. On July 11, 2016, McCarthy opted to return for a second season with the Barracuda, signing a one-year AHL contract as a free agent on July 11, 2016. He re-signed with the Barracuda on April 19, 2018.

On December 27, 2019, McCarthy announced his retirement for health reasons; he had suffered an Ischemic stroke on December 10 due to an undetected hole in his heart. Later in the day, he joined the Barracuda's coaching staff. He was named the Barracuda's head coach on May 18, 2022.

== Career statistics ==
=== Regular season and playoffs ===
			Regular season					Playoffs
Season	Team	League	GP	G	A	Pts	PIM	GP	G	A	Pts	PIM
2003–04	St. John's Preparatory School	HS Prep	23	18	17	35	18	—	—	—	—	—
2004–05	Des Moines Buccaneers	USHL	60	8	10	18	32	—	—	—	—	—
2005–06	Boston University	HE	32	2	2	4	12	—	—	—	—	—
2006–07	Boston University	HE	39	2	3	5	18	—	—	—	—	—
2007–08	Boston University	HE	38	4	3	7	24	—	—	—	—	—
2008–09	Boston University	HE	45	6	23	29	24	—	—	—	—	—
2009–10	Worcester Sharks	AHL	74	15	27	42	39	11	2	3	5	10
2009–10	San Jose Sharks	NHL	4	0	0	0	0	—	—	—	—	—
2010–11	San Jose Sharks	NHL	37	2	2	4	8	—	—	—	—	—
2010–11	Worcester Sharks	AHL	25	7	5	12	13	—	—	—	—	—
2011–12	Worcester Sharks	AHL	65	20	27	47	41	—	—	—	—	—
2011–12	San Jose Sharks	NHL	10	0	0	0	10	—	—	—	—	—
2012–13	Worcester Sharks	AHL	65	9	16	25	12	—	—	—	—	—
2013–14	San Jose Sharks	NHL	36	1	1	2	4	—	—	—	—	—
2013–14	Worcester Sharks	AHL	13	3	4	7	9	—	—	—	—	—
2014–15	Chicago Wolves	AHL	25	5	3	8	11	—	—	—	—	—
2014–15	Worcester Sharks	AHL	35	9	9	18	8	—	—	—	—	—
2015–16	San Jose Barracuda	AHL	67	16	29	45	22	4	0	0	0	0
2015–16	San Jose Sharks	NHL	1	0	0	0	0	—	—	—	—	—
2016–17	San Jose Barracuda	AHL	67	19	14	33	26	15	2	5	7	18
2017–18	San Jose Barracuda	AHL	56	10	16	26	18	4	0	1	1	0
2018–19	San Jose Barracuda	AHL	67	13	17	30	26	4	1	2	3	0
2019–20	San Jose Barracuda	AHL	18	4	0	4	8	—	—	—	—	—
AHL totals			577	130	167	297	233	38	5	11	16	28
NHL totals			88	3	3	6	22	—	—	—	—	—

=== International ===
Year	Team	Event	Result	GP	G	A	Pts	PIM
2018	United States	OG	7th	5	0	0	0	2
Senior totals				5	0	0	0	2

== Awards and honors ==
Award	Year
College
HE All-Tournament Team	2009
Swifts Beach Open Champion	
