= 2008–09 AHL season =

- League: American Hockey League
- Sport: Ice hockey
- Duration: October 8, 2008 - April 12, 2009

Regular season
- Macgregor Kilpatrick Trophy: Manitoba Moose
- Season MVP: Alexandre Giroux
- Top scorer: Alexandre Giroux

Playoffs
- Playoffs MVP: Michal Neuvirth

Calder Cup
- Champions: Hershey Bears
- Runners-up: Manitoba Moose

AHL seasons
- 2007–08 2009–10

The 2008–09 AHL season was the 73rd season of the American Hockey League. 29 teams each played 80 games in the regular season, which ran from October 8 until April 12.

== Team and NHL affiliation changes ==
The Iowa Stars are renamed and are now called the Iowa Chops, and the Anaheim Ducks have replaced the Dallas Stars as the team's NHL affiliate.

The Dallas Stars have no AHL affiliate this year, with the Texas Stars (based in Austin) to become their affiliate for the 2009–10 season.

On April 28, 2009, it was announced that two teams would be relocated for the 2009–10 season: the Quad City Flames would move to Abbotsford, BC, and the Philadelphia Phantoms would relocate to Glens Falls, NY.

=== Affiliation changes ===
AHL team	New affiliate	Old affiliate
Iowa Chops	Anaheim Ducks	Dallas Stars
Portland Pirates	Buffalo Sabres	Anaheim Ducks
Rochester Americans	Florida Panthers	Buffalo Sabres/Florida Panthers

== Final standings ==
- y– indicates team clinched division and a playoff spot
- x– indicates team clinched a playoff spot
- e– indicates team was eliminated from playoff contention

=== Eastern Conference ===
Atlantic Division	GP	W	L	OTL	SOL	Pts	GF	GA
y–Hartford Wolf Pack (NYR)	80	46	27	3	4	99	243	216
x–Providence Bruins (BOS)	80	43	29	2	6	94	238	232
x–Portland Pirates (BUF)	80	39	31	3	7	88	249	239
x–Worcester Sharks (SJS)	80	42	35	1	2	87	223	223
e–Manchester Monarchs (LAK)	80	37	35	0	8	82	211	218
e–Lowell Devils (NJD)	80	35	36	2	7	79	213	243
e–Springfield Falcons (EDM)	80	24	44	8	4	60	188	258

East Division	GP	W	L	OTL	SOL	Pts	GF	GA
y–Hershey Bears (WSH)	80	49	23	2	6	106	296	240
x–Bridgeport Sound Tigers (NYI)	80	49	23	3	5	106	241	212
x–Wilkes-Barre/Scranton Penguins (PIT)	80	49	25	3	3	104	274	212
x–Philadelphia Phantoms (PHI)	80	43	30	2	5	93	234	232
e–Binghamton Senators (OTT)	80	41	30	5	4	91	232	238
e–Norfolk Admirals (TBL)	80	33	38	4	5	75	236	269
e–Albany River Rats (CAR)	80	33	40	3	4	73	219	258

=== Western Conference ===
North Division	GP	W	L	OTL	SOL	Pts	GF	GA
y–Manitoba Moose (VAN)	80	50	23	1	6	107	239	188
x–Hamilton Bulldogs (MTL)	80	49	27	4	0	102	263	201
x–Grand Rapids Griffins (DET)	80	43	25	6	6	98	255	226
x–Toronto Marlies (TOR)	80	39	29	5	7	90	240	229
e–Syracuse Crunch (CBJ)	80	40	32	5	3	88	214	226
e–Lake Erie Monsters (COL)	80	34	38	3	5	76	199	218
e–Rochester Americans (FLA)	80	29	43	0	8	66	184	259

West Division	GP	W	L	OTL	SOL	Pts	GF	GA
y–Milwaukee Admirals (NSH)	80	49	22	3	6	107	229	195
x–Peoria Rivermen (STL)	80	43	31	2	4	92	215	211
x–Houston Aeros (MIN)	80	38	31	2	9	87	218	230
x–Rockford IceHogs (CHI)	80	40	34	0	6	86	229	220
e–Quad City Flames (CGY)	80	36	31	6	7	85	212	216
e–Chicago Wolves (ATL)	80	38	37	3	2	81	226	222
e–Iowa Chops (ANA)	80	33	33	4	10	80	209	260
e–San Antonio Rampage (PHX)	80	36	38	2	4	78	205	243

== Scoring leaders ==
Note: GP = Games played; G = Goals; A = Assists; Pts = Points; PIM = Penalty minutes

Player	Team	GP	G	A	Pts	PIM
Alexandre Giroux	Hershey Bears	69	60	37	97	84
Keith Aucoin	Hershey Bears	70	25	71	96	73
Jason Krog	Manitoba Moose	74	30	56	86	30
Janne Pesonen	Wilkes-Barre/Scranton Penguins	70	32	50	82	33
Artem Anisimov	Hartford Wolfpack	80	37	44	81	50
Darren Haydar	Grand Rapids Griffins	79	31	49	80	26
Tim Stapleton	Toronto Marlies	70	28	51	79	26
Corey Locke	Houston Aeros	77	25	54	79	60
Pierre-Alexandre Parenteau	Hartford Wolfpack	74	29	49	78	142
Kyle Greentree	Quad City Flames	79	39	37	76	63

== Calder Cup playoffs ==
In each division, the fourth-place team will play the first-place team in the division semifinals, while the second-place team plays the third-place team.

=== Bracket ===
Division Semifinals	Division Finals
A1	Hartford	2
A4	Worcester	4
A4	Worcester	2
Atlantic Division
A2	Providence	4
A2	Providence	4
A3	Portland	1
Eastern Conference
E1	Hershey	4
E4	Philadelphia	0
E1	Hershey	4
East Division
E3	WBS	3
E2	Bridgeport	1
E3	WBS	4
N1	Manitoba	4
N4	Toronto	2
N1	Manitoba	4
North Division
N3	Grand Rapids	0
N2	Hamilton	2
N3	Grand Rapids	4
Western Conference
W1	Milwaukee	4
W4	Rockford	0
W1	Milwaukee	3
West Division
W3	Houston	4
W2	Peoria	3
W3	Houston	4

Conference Finals
A2	Providence	1
E1	Hershey	4
N1	Manitoba	4
W3	Houston	2

Calder Cup Finals
N1	Manitoba	2
E1	Hershey	4

- A is short for Atlantic Division
- E is short for East Division
- N is short for North Division
- W is short for West Division

== All Star Classic ==
The 22nd AHL All-Star Classic was played in Worcester, Massachusetts, on January 26, 2009, with the PlanetUSA All-Stars defeating the Canadian All-Stars 14–11 after scoring nine goals in the third period to come back from an 8–5 deficit. Corey Locke scored four goals for the Canadian All-Stars, while Jeff Taffe had a hat-trick for the PlanetUSA All-Stars.
The host club was the Worcester Sharks. The 2009 event in Worcester marked the fourth time since 1995 that the AHL All-Star Classic took place in New England. The AHL All-Star Game was last held in Massachusetts in 1959 at the Eastern States Coliseum in West Springfield.

	Planet USA All-Stars	Canadian All-Stars
Coach:	Don Granato (Chicago Wolves)	Bob Woods (Hershey Bears)
Assistant coach(es):	Jason Christie, Wendell Young (Chicago Wolves)	Mark French (Hershey Bears)
Starters:	(Latvia) #15 F Martins Karsums (Providence Bruins) (United States) #16 F Ryan Vesce (Worcester Sharks) (United States) #17 F Chris Bourque (Hershey Bears) (Czech Republic) #5 D Jakub Kindl (Grand Rapids Griffins) (Switzerland) #7 D Yannick Weber (Hamilton Bulldogs) (United States) #35 G Cory Schneider (Manitoba Moose)	(Canada) #9 F Mike Santorelli (Milwaukee Admirals) (Canada) #12 F Alexandre Giroux (Hershey Bears) (Canada) #14 F Chris Minard (Wilkes-Barre/Scranton Penguins) (Canada) #3 D Johnny Boychuk (Providence Bruins) (Canada) #77 D Derek Joslin (Worcester Sharks) (Canada) #29 G Mike Brodeur (Rochester Americans)
Reserves:	(United States) #4 D Rory Fitzpatrick (Rochester Americans, captain) (United States) #6 D Ben Lovejoy (Wilkes-Barre/Scranton Penguins) (United States) #8 F Jared Ross (Philadelphia Phantoms†) (United States) #11 F Keith Aucoin (Hershey Bears) (United States) #12 F Ryan Potulny (Springfield Falcons) (United States) #14 F Michael Ryan (Albany River Rats) (United States) #18 F Brian Salcido (Iowa Chops†) (Finland) #20 F Petri Kontiola (Rockford Icehogs) (United States) #21 F Joe Motzko (Chicago Wolves) (United States) #22 F Jeff Taffe (Wilkes-Barre/Scranton Penguins) (United States) #26 D Jaime Sifers (Toronto Marlies) (United States) #31 G Jeff Frazee (Lowell Devils) (Sweden) #40 D Mattias Karlsson (Binghamton Senators) (Russia) #42 F Artem Anisimov (Hartford Wolf Pack†) (Sweden) #44 D Jonas Junland (Peoria Rivermen) (Sweden) #86 G Daniel Larsson (Grand Rapids Griffins) (United States) #10 F Tim Kennedy (Portland Pirates**) (United States) #18 F Drew Miller (Iowa Chops*) (United States) #19 F Nathan Gerbe (Portland Pirates**) (United States) #21 D Bobby Sanguinetti (Hartford Wolf Pack**) (Russia) #90 F Nikita Filatov (Syracuse Crunch*)	(Canada) #2 D Andrew MacDonald (Bridgeport Sound Tigers) (Canada) #6 D Cody Franson (Milwaukee Admirals) (Canada) #7 D Brett Palin (Quad City Flames) (Canada) #16 F Cal O'Reilly (Milwaukee Admirals) (Canada) #20 D Bryan Helmer (Hershey Bears, captain) (Canada) #24 F Derek MacKenzie (Syracuse Crunch†) (Canada) #25 F Mark Mancari (Portland Pirates) (Canada) #26 F Brandon Segal (Norfolk Admirals†) (Canada) #30 G Tyler Weiman (Lake Erie Monsters†) (Canada) #33 G Barry Brust (Houston Aeros) (Canada) #37 F Mike Iggulden (Bridgeport Sound Tigers) (Canada) #48 D Kyle Cumiskey (Lake Erie Monsters) (Canada) #62 F Teddy Purcell (Manchester Monarchs) (Canada) #75 D Danny Syvret (Philadelphia Phantoms†) (Canada) #84 F Corey Locke (Houston Aeros) (Canada) #97 F Brett MacLean (San Antonio Rampage) (Canada) #1 G Brian Elliott (Binghamton Senators*) (Canada) #10 F Jason Krog (Manitoba Moose**) (Canada) #19 F Claude Giroux (Philadelphia Phantoms*) (Canada) #24 F Steve Downie (Norfolk Admirals*) (Canada) #39 F Martin St. Pierre (Providence Bruins*)

* indicates player was called up to his NHL team. ** indicates player was named to All-Star team, but missed game due to injury. † indicates player was named as a replacement due to callups or injury.

== Trophy and award winners ==
=== Team awards ===
Calder Cup; Playoff champions:	Hershey Bears
Richard F. Canning Trophy; Eastern Conference playoff champions:	Hershey Bears
Robert W. Clarke Trophy; Western Conference playoff champions:	Manitoba Moose
Macgregor Kilpatrick Trophy; Regular season champions, League:	Manitoba Moose
Frank Mathers Trophy; Regular season champions, Eastern Conference:	Hershey Bears
Norman R. "Bud" Poile Trophy; Regular season champions, Western Conference:	Manitoba Moose
Emile Francis Trophy; Regular season champions, Atlantic Division:	Hartford Wolf Pack
F. G. "Teddy" Oke Trophy; Regular season champions, East Division:	Hershey Bears
Sam Pollock Trophy; Regular season champions, North Division:	Manitoba Moose
John D. Chick Trophy; Regular season champions, West Division:	Milwaukee Admirals

== See also ==
- List of AHL seasons
- 2008 in ice hockey
- 2009 in ice hockey

Preceded by 2007–08 AHL season	AHL seasons	Succeeded by 2009–10 AHL season
