= 2017 Calder Cup playoffs =

North American ice hockey tournament

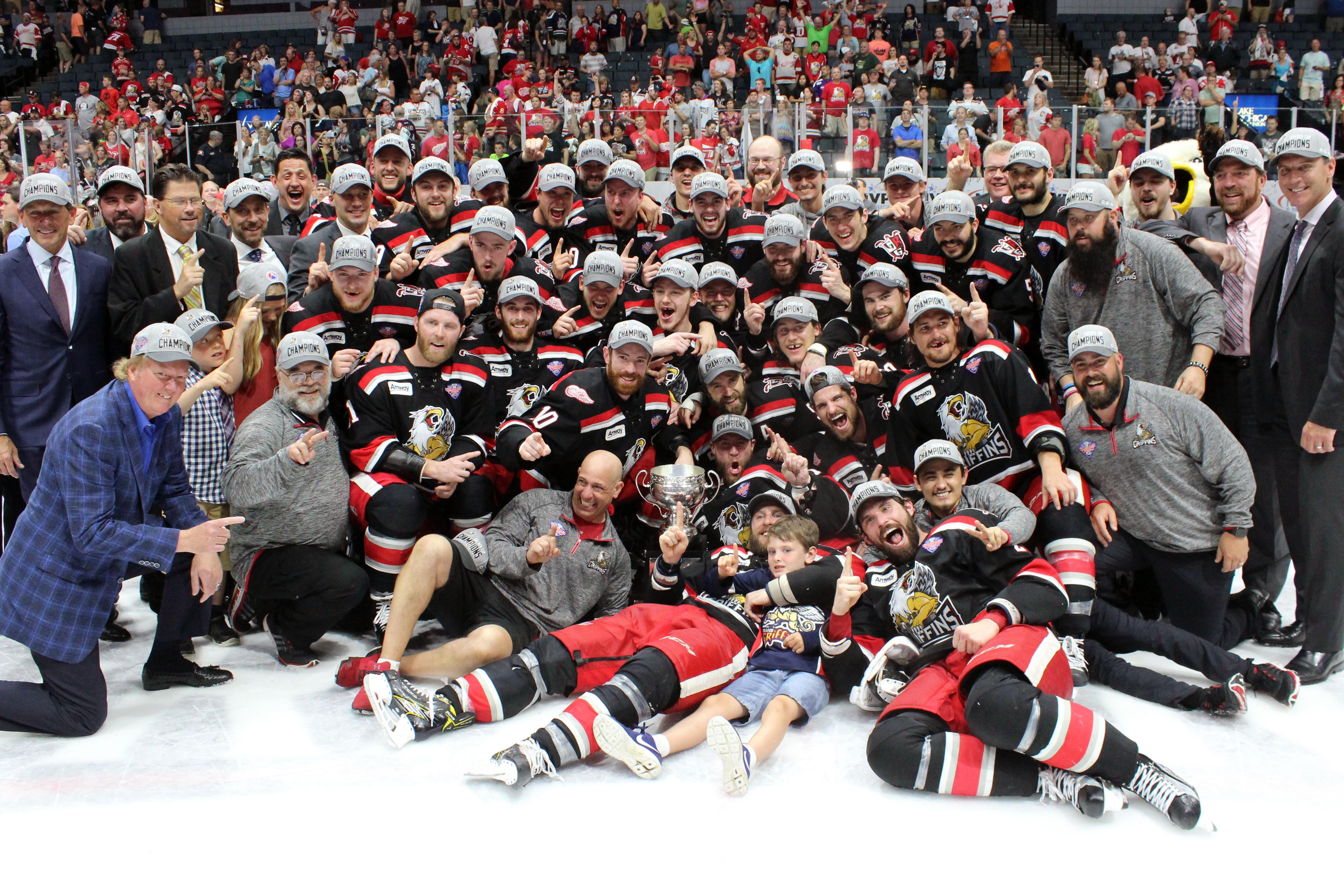
- The champion Grand Rapids Griffins

Tournament details
- Dates: April 20 – June 13, 2017
- Teams: 16

Final positions
- Champions: Grand Rapids Griffins
- Runners-up: Syracuse Crunch

Tournament statistics
- Scoring leader(s): Cory Conacher (Crunch) (28 points)

Awards
- MVP: Tyler Bertuzzi (Griffins)

The 2017 Calder Cup playoffs of the American Hockey League began on April 20, 2017, with the playoff format that was introduced in 2016. The sixteen teams that qualified, eight from each conference, played best-of-five series in the division semifinals, with the playoffs continuing with best-of-seven series for the division finals, conference finals, and Calder Cup finals. The Grand Rapids Griffins won their second Calder Cup championship by defeating the Syracuse Crunch 4-games-to-2 in the finals, in a repeat of the 2013 finals.

== Playoff seeds ==
After the 2016–17 AHL regular season, 16 teams qualified for the playoffs. The top four teams in each division ranked by points percentage (points earned divided by points available) qualify for the 2017 Calder Cup Playoffs.

At the end of the regular season, the following teams qualified (with points percentage):

=== Eastern Conference ===
==== Atlantic Division ====
1. Wilkes-Barre/Scranton Penguins – 107 points (.704)
2. Lehigh Valley Phantoms – 101 points (.664)
3. Hershey Bears – 97 points (.638)
4. Providence Bruins – 96 points (.632)

==== North Division ====
1. Syracuse Crunch – 90 points (.592)
2. Toronto Marlies – 89 points (.586)
3. Albany Devils – 83 points (.546)
4. St. John's IceCaps – 82 points (.539)

=== Western Conference ===
==== Central Division ====
1. Chicago Wolves – 101 points (.664)
2. Grand Rapids Griffins – 100 points (.658)
3. Milwaukee Admirals – 93 points (.612)
4. Charlotte Checkers – 86 points (.566), 36 ROWs

==== Pacific Division ====
1. San Jose Barracuda – 95 points (.699)
2. San Diego Gulls – 89 points (.664)
3. Ontario Reign – 83 points (.619)
4. Stockton Heat – 76 points (.567)

== Bracket ==
Division semifinals	Division finals
A1	W-B/Scranton	2
A4	Providence	3
A4	Providence	4
A3	Hershey	3
A2	Lehigh Valley	2
A3	Hershey	3
Eastern Conference
N1	Syracuse	3
N4	St. John's	1
N1	Syracuse	4
N2	Toronto	3
N2	Toronto	3
N3	Albany	1
C1	Chicago	3
C4	Charlotte	2
C1	Chicago	1
C2	Grand Rapids	4
C2	Grand Rapids	3
C3	Milwaukee	0
Western Conference
P1	San Jose	3
P4	Stockton	2
P1	San Jose	4
P2	San Diego	1
P2	San Diego	3
P3	Ontario	2

Conference finals
A4	Providence	1
N1	Syracuse	4
C2	Grand Rapids	4
P1	San Jose	1

Calder Cup final
N1	Syracuse	2
C2	Grand Rapids	4

== Division semifinals ==
Note 1: All times are in Eastern Time (UTC−04:00).
Note 2: Game times in italics signify games to be played only if necessary.
Note 3: Home team is listed first.

=== Eastern Conference ===
==== (A1) Wilkes-Barre/Scranton Penguins vs. (A4) Providence Bruins ====
April 21	Providence Bruins	2 – 1	Wilkes-Barre/Scranton Penguins	Dunkin' Donuts Center	Recap
Jake DeBrusk (1) – pp – 12:11		First period	No scoring
No scoring		Second period	16:34 – Jean-Sebastien Dea (1)
Danton Heinen (1) – pp – 6:12		Third period	No scoring
Zane McIntyre 30 saves / 31 shots		Goalie stats	Casey DeSmith 31 saves / 33 shots

April 23	Providence Bruins	5 – 6	OT	Wilkes-Barre/Scranton Penguins	Dunkin' Donuts Center	Recap
No scoring		First period		No scoring
Chris Porter (1) – 9:52; Chris Porter (2) – 17:11; Tommy Cross (1) – 18:14		Second period		1:58 – pp – David Warsofsky (1); 2:21 – David Warsofsky (2); 9:38 – Tom Sestito (1)
Danton Heinen (2) – pp – 7:38; Peter Mueller (1) – 12:48		Third period		3:58 – Josh Archibald (1); 18:57 – Josh Archibald (2)
No scoring		First overtime period		7:49 – Derrick Pouliot (1)
Zane McIntyre 38 saves / 44 shots		Goalie stats		Casey DeSmith 28 saves / 33 shots

April 27	Wilkes-Barre/Scranton Penguins	2 – 1	Providence Bruins	Mohegan Sun Arena at Casey Plaza	Recap
No scoring		First period	No scoring
Tim Erixon (1) – pp – 19:43		Second period	No scoring
David Warsofsky (3) – pp – 1:32		Third period	13:25 – pp – Jordan Szwarz (1)
Casey DeSmith 32 saves / 33 shots		Goalie stats	Zane McIntyre 30 saves / 32 shots

April 28	Wilkes-Barre/Scranton Penguins	2 – 4	Providence Bruins	Mohegan Sun Arena at Casey Plaza	Recap
No scoring		First period	1:15 – Wayne Simpson (1); 9:01 – pp – Colton Hargrove (1); 19:15 – Jake DeBrusk (2)
Teodors Blugers (1) – 17:48		Second period	14:09 – Jake DeBrusk (3)
Ethan Prow (1) – 9:10		Third period	No scoring
Casey DeSmith 38 saves / 42 shots		Goalie stats	Zane McIntyre 27 saves / 29 shots

April 30	Wilkes-Barre/Scranton Penguins	1 – 2	Providence Bruins	Mohegan Sun Arena at Casey Plaza	Recap
No scoring		First period	12:37 – pp – Danton Heinen (3)
No scoring		Second period	No scoring
Jean-Sebastien Dea (2) – pp – 14:37		Third period	13:00 – Danton Heinen (4)
Casey DeSmith 24 saves / 26 shots		Goalie stats	Zane McIntyre 50 saves / 51 shots

Providence wins series 3–2

==== (A2) Lehigh Valley Phantoms vs. (A3) Hershey Bears ====
April 21	Lehigh Valley Phantoms	0 – 1	OT	Hershey Bears	PPL Center	Recap
No scoring		First period		No scoring
No scoring		Second period		No scoring
No scoring		Third period		No scoring
No scoring		First overtime period		7:38 – Nathan Walker (1)
Alex Lyon 20 saves / 21 shots		Goalie stats		Pheonix Copley 32 saves / 32 shots

April 22	Lehigh Valley Phantoms	4 – 5	Hershey Bears	PPL Center	Recap
T. J. Brennan (1) – pp – 1:10; Andy Miele (1) – pp – 19:48		First period	5:58 – Stanislav Galiev (1)
Greg Carey (1) – 14:24; Greg Carey (2) – 17:12		Second period	3:47 – Christian Djoos (1)
No scoring		Third period	7:27 – Chris Bourque (1); 9:55 – Tyler Lewington (1); 19:27 – Chris Bourque (2)
Alex Lyon 10 saves / 13 shots Martin Ouellette 2 saves / 4 shots		Goalie stats	Pheonix Copley 30 saves / 34 shots

April 26	Hershey Bears	1 – 2	OT	Lehigh Valley Phantoms	Giant Center	Recap
No scoring		First period		No scoring
Stanislav Galiev (2) – 11:35		Second period		No scoring
No scoring		Third period		0:37 – Colin McDonald (1)
No scoring		First overtime period		1:49 – Chris Conner (1)
Pheonix Copley 28 saves / 30 shots		Goalie stats		Martin Ouellette 29 saves / 30 shots

April 29	Hershey Bears	1 – 4	Lehigh Valley Phantoms	Giant Center	Recap
No scoring		First period	16:51 – Danick Martel (1)
Chandler Stephenson (1) – 15:01		Second period	4:25 – Mark Zengerle (1)
No scoring		Third period	4:48 – Scott Laughton (1); 19:48 – en – Scott Laughton (2)
Pheonix Copley 34 saves / 37 shots		Goalie stats	Martin Ouellette 27 saves / 28 shots

April 30	Lehigh Valley Phantoms	2 – 3	Hershey Bears	PPL Center	Recap
No scoring		First period	5:32 – Stanislav Galiev (3); 11:04 – Christian Thomas (1)
Colin McDonald (2) – pp – 2:40		Second period	No scoring
Taylor Leier (1) – 12:50		Third period	6:16 – Colby Williams (1)
Martin Ouellette 23 saves / 26 shots		Goalie stats	Pheonix Copley 28 saves / 30 shots

Hershey wins series 3–2

==== (N1) Syracuse Crunch vs. (N4) St. John's IceCaps ====
April 21	St. John's IceCaps	2 – 1	Syracuse Crunch	Mile One Centre	Recap
Nikita Scherbak (1) – pp – 16:05		First period	No scoring
Chris Terry (1) – 2:59		Second period	No scoring
No scoring		Third period	10:21 – pp – Tye McGinn (1)
Charlie Lindgren 28 saves / 29 shots		Goalie stats	Mike McKenna 19 saves / 21 shots

April 22	St. John's IceCaps	3 – 4	2OT	Syracuse Crunch	Mile One Centre	Recap
No scoring		First period		No scoring
Jacob de la Rose (1) – 8:33		Second period		10:10 – Slater Koekkoek (1)
Charles Hudon (1) – 4:46; Stefan Matteau (1) – 8:30		Third period		15:43 – Matt Taormina (1); 17:16 – Cory Conacher (1)
No scoring		Second overtime period		10:37 – Tye McGinn (2)
Charlie Lindgren 46 saves / 50 shots		Goalie stats		Mike McKenna 38 saves / 41 shots

April 26	Syracuse Crunch	3 – 2	St. John's IceCaps	Oncenter War Memorial Arena	Recap
Joel Vermin (1) – 11:30; Erik Condra (1) – 13:28		First period	No scoring
Byron Froese (1) – 16:05		Second period	12:17 – pp – Zach Redmond (1); 12:45 – Stefan Matteau (2)
No scoring		Third period	No scoring
Mike McKenna 26 saves / 28 shots		Goalie stats	Charlie Lindgren 22 saves / 25 shots

April 28	Syracuse Crunch	2 – 1	OT	St. John's IceCaps	Oncenter War Memorial Arena	Recap
Erik Condra (2) – pp – 16:41		First period		No scoring
No scoring		Second period		No scoring
No scoring		Third period		14:27 – pp – Stefan Matteau (3)
Gabriel Dumont (1) – 2:18		First overtime period		No scoring
Mike McKenna 26 saves / 27 shots		Goalie stats		Charlie Lindgren 23 saves / 25 shots

Syracuse wins series 3–1

==== (N2) Toronto Marlies vs. (N3) Albany Devils ====
April 20	Albany Devils	3 – 0	Toronto Marlies	Times Union Center	Recap
Ben Thomson (1) – 16:22		First period	No scoring
John Quenneville (1) – pp – 13:03		Second period	No scoring
Brian Gibbons (1) – en – 19:23		Third period	No scoring
Mackenzie Blackwood 27 saves / 27 shots		Goalie stats	Garret Sparks 20 saves / 22 shots

April 22	Albany Devils	2 – 6	Toronto Marlies	Times Union Center	Recap
Kevin Rooney (1) – 18:25		First period	2:56 – pp – Kerby Rychel (1); 18:36 – Sergey Kalinin
John Quenneville (2) – 8:59		Second period	4:15 – Frederik Gauthier (1); 6:38 – Colin Greening (1); 16:09 – Andreas Johnsson (1)
No scoring		Third period	4:35 – Trevor Moore (1)
Mackenzie Blackwood 9 saves / 13 shots Ken Appleby 8 saves / 10 shots		Goalie stats	Garret Sparks 16 saves / 18 shots Kasimir Kaskisuo 3 saves / 3 shots

April 26	Toronto Marlies	3 – 2	OT	Albany Devils	Ricoh Coliseum	Recap
Brendan Leipsic (1) – 3:49		First period		10:16 – pp – John Quenneville (3)
Brendan Leipsic (2) – 17:59		Second period		18:22 – Carter Camper (1)
No scoring		Third period		No scoring
Colin Greening (2) – 0:45		First overtime period		No scoring
Kasimir Kaskisuo 27 saves / 29 shots		Goalie stats		Mackenzie Blackwood 22 saves / 25 shots

April 28	Toronto Marlies	2 – 1	3OT	Albany Devils	Ricoh Coliseum	Recap
Travis Dermott (1) – 8:55		First period		No scoring
No scoring		Second period		16:53 – Carter Camper (2)
No scoring		Third period		No scoring
Justin Holl (1) – 6:43		Third overtime period		No scoring
Kasimir Kaskisuo 30 saves / 31 shots		Goalie stats		Mackenzie Blackwood 58 saves / 60 shots

Toronto wins series 3–1

=== Western Conference ===
==== (C1) Chicago Wolves vs. (C4) Charlotte Checkers ====
April 20	Charlotte Checkers	4 – 0	Chicago Wolves	Bojangles' Coliseum	Recap
Brendan Woods (1) – 11:27		First period	No scoring
Lucas Wallmark (1) – 7:44		Second period	No scoring
Andrew Miller (1) – 16:09; Lucas Wallmark (2) – en – 19:23		Third period	No scoring
Tom McCollum 20 saves / 20 shots		Goalie stats	Ville Husso 23 saves / 26 shots

April 21	Charlotte Checkers	2 – 3	Chicago Wolves	Bojangles' Coliseum	Recap
No scoring		First period	4:15 – Alex Friesen (1)
Andrew Miller (2) – 3:53; Dennis Robertson (1) – 18:26		Second period	5:44 – Samuel Blais (1)
No scoring		Third period	14:49 – Adam Musil (1)
Tom McCollum 32 saves / 35 shots		Goalie stats	Ville Husso 37 saves / 39 shots

April 23	Chicago Wolves	3 – 4	OT	Charlotte Checkers	Allstate Arena	Recap
No scoring		First period		15:15 – Philip Samuelsson (1); 19:14 – Andrew Miller (3)
Kenny Agostino (1) – 0:24; Adam Musil (2) – 2:12		Second period		No scoring
Ty Loney (1) – 3:35		Third period		2:03 – Patrick Brown (1)
No scoring		First overtime period		9:28 – Connor Brickley (1)
Ville Husso 30 saves / 34 shots		Goalie stats		Tom McCollum 38 saves / 41 shots

April 25	Chicago Wolves	5 – 1	Charlotte Checkers	Allstate Arena	Recap
Samuel Blais (2) – 12:19		First period	1:51 – Lucas Wallmark (3)
No scoring		Second period	No scoring
Jake Walman (1) – 1:58; Jordan Schmaltz (1) – 3:54; Ty Rattie (1) – en – 17:19; Ty Rattie (2) – pp – 19:03		Third period	No scoring
Ville Husso 26 saves / 27 shots		Goalie stats	Tom McCollum 29 saves / 33 shots

April 26	Chicago Wolves	3 – 2	Charlotte Checkers	Allstate Arena	Recap
Kenny Agostino (2) – pp – 1:50; Andrew Agozzino (1) – pp – 4:28		First period	No scoring
Adam Musil (3) – sh – 4:01		Second period	5:09 – Connor Brickley (2)
No scoring		Third period	13:26 – Phillip Di Giuseppe (1)
Ville Husso 32 saves / 34 shots		Goalie stats	Tom McCollum 2 saves / 4 shots Michael Leighton 14 saves / 15 shots

Chicago wins series 3–2

==== (C2) Grand Rapids Griffins vs. (C3) Milwaukee Admirals ====
April 21	Grand Rapids Griffins	4 – 3	OT	Milwaukee Admirals	Van Andel Arena	Recap
Matthew Ford (1) – pp – 17:23; Evgeny Svechnikov (1) – 17:36		First period		12:08 – pp – Frederick Gaudreau (1); 18:44 – Petter Granberg (1)
No scoring		Second period		16:53 – Frederick Gaudreau (2)
Matt Lorito (1) – 10:45		Third period		No scoring
Tomas Nosek (1) – 9:32		First overtime period		No scoring
Jared Coreau 32 saves / 35 shots		Goalie stats		Marek Mazanec 38 saves / 42 shots

April 23	Grand Rapids Griffins	5 – 2	Milwaukee Admirals	Van Andel Arena	Recap
Eric Tangradi (1) – 0:25; Axel Holmstrom (1) – 8:37		First period	2:12 – Vladislav Kamenev (1)
Tyler Bertuzzi (1) – 6:23		Second period	No scoring
Tyler Bertuzzi (2) – en – 19:07; Matthew Ford (2) – en – 19:44		Third period	12:35 – Frederick Gaudreau (3)
Jared Coreau 21 saves / 23 shots		Goalie stats	Marek Mazanec 23 saves / 26 shots

April 26	Milwaukee Admirals	2 – 3	OT	Grand Rapids Griffins	UW–Milwaukee Panther Arena	Recap
No scoring		First period		No scoring
Trevor Murphy (1) – 8:29		Second period		18:30 – pp – Tomas Nosek (2)
Trevor Murphy (2) – 12:37		Third period		16:22 – Matt Lorito (2)
No scoring		First overtime period		10:03 – Kyle Criscuolo (1)
Marek Mazanec 35 saves / 38 shots		Goalie stats		Jared Coreau 41 saves / 43 shots

Grand Rapids wins series 3–0

==== (P1) San Jose Barracuda vs. (P4) Stockton Heat ====
April 21	San Jose Barracuda	4 – 0	Stockton Heat	SAP Center	Recap
Tim Heed (1) – 6:38		First period	No scoring
Ryan Carpenter (1) – 3:34		Second period	No scoring
Ryan Carpenter (2) – 11:37; Kevin Labanc (1) – en – 19:21		Third period	No scoring
Troy Grosenick 28 saves / 28 shots		Goalie stats	Jon Gillies 32 saves / 35 shots

April 23	San Jose Barracuda	4 – 6	Stockton Heat	SAP Center	Recap
No scoring		First period	1:30 – Mark Jankowski (1); 12:22 – Austin Carroll (1); 16:23 – pp – Linden Vey (1); 17:07 – Garnet Hathaway (1)
Joakim Ryan (1) – pp – 6:12; John McCarthy (1) – 7:31; Joakim Ryan (2) – 11:02		Second period	17:43 – Hunter Shinkaruk (1)
Buddy Robinson (1) – sh – 16:19		Third period	18:55 – en – Linden Vey (2)
Troy Grosenick 14 saves / 19 shots		Goalie stats	Jon Gillies 17 saves / 20 shots David Rittich 11 saves / 12 shots

April 28	Stockton Heat	3 – 5	San Jose Barracuda	Stockton Arena	Recap
No scoring		First period	3:49 – Barclay Goodrow (1); 19:44 – Danny O'Regan (1)
Mike Angelidis (1) – pp – 11:48; Brandon Bollig (1) – 13:16		Second period	No scoring
Michael Kostka (1) – pp – 19:32		Third period	15:17 – Ryan Carpenter (3); 16:43 – Timo Meier (1); 19:45 – en – Buddy Robinson (2)
David Rittich 28 saves / 32 shots		Goalie stats	Troy Grosenick 30 saves / 33 shots

April 30	Stockton Heat	5 – 3	San Jose Barracuda	Stockton Arena	Recap
No scoring		First period	0:58 – Danny O'Regan (2)
Hunter Shinkaruk (2) – 6:21; Garnet Hathaway (2) – 7:55		Second period	17:55 – Buddy Robinson (3)
Andrew Mangiapane (1) – 14:55; Linden Vey (3) – 17:04; Linden Vey (4) – en – 18:38		Third period	4:38 – Tim Heed (2)
David Rittich 34 saves / 37 shots		Goalie stats	Troy Grosenick 28 saves / 32 shots

May 2	San Jose Barracuda	2 – 1	OT	Stockton Heat	SAP Center	Recap
No scoring		First period		No scoring
No scoring		Second period		10:38 – Jamie Devane
Timo Meier (2) – 9:47		Third period		No scoring
Ryan Carpenter (4) – sh – 8:52		First overtime period		No scoring
Troy Grosenick 27 saves / 28 shots		Goalie stats		David Rittich 15 saves / 15 shots Jon Gillies 37 saves / 39 shots

San Jose wins series 3–2

==== (P2) San Diego Gulls vs. (P3) Ontario Reign ====
April 21	San Diego Gulls	2 – 3	Ontario Reign	Valley View Casino Center	Recap
No scoring		First period	12:34 – Jonny Brodzinski (1)
Sam Carrick (1) – 10:03; Nic Kerdiles (1) – 13:59		Second period	5:49 – T. J. Hensick (1)
No scoring		Third period	19:48 – Jonny Brodzinski (2)
Jhonas Enroth 27 saves / 30 shots		Goalie stats	Jack Campbell 32 saves / 34 shots

April 22	Ontario Reign	1 – 2	San Diego Gulls	Citizens Business Bank Arena	Recap
No scoring		First period	4:23 – pp – Nick Sorensen (1); 4:54 – Nick Sorensen (2)
Michael Amadio (1) – 3:29		Second period	No scoring
No scoring		Third period	No scoring
Jack Campbell 22 saves / 24 shots		Goalie stats	Jhonas Enroth 23 saves / 24 shots

April 28	San Diego Gulls	3 – 1	Ontario Reign	Valley View Casino Center	Recap
Kalle Kossila (1) – pp – 6:00		First period	9:30 – pp – Michael Amadio (2)
No scoring		Second period	No scoring
Nic Kerdiles (2) – 18:27; Antoine Laganiere – en – 19:32		Third period	No scoring
Jhonas Enroth 38 saves / 39 shots		Goalie stats	Jack Campbell 24 saves / 26 shots

May 1	Ontario Reign	4 – 1	San Diego Gulls	Citizens Business Bank Arena	Recap
No scoring		First period	No scoring
Justin Auger (1) – 5:16		Second period	18:47 – pp – Keaton Thompson (1)
Paul LaDue (1) – 3:30; Justin Auger (2) – 14:57; T. J. Hensick (2) – en – 18:06		Third period	No scoring
Jack Campbell 21 saves / 22 shots		Goalie stats	Jhonas Enroth 31 saves / 34 shots

May 2	San Diego Gulls	4 – 1	Ontario Reign	Valley View Casino Center	Recap
Nic Kerdiles (3) – pp – 9:03; Keaton Thompson (2) – 10:01; Kevin Roy (1) – 11:40		First period	No scoring
No scoring		Second period	No scoring
Jordan Samuels-Thomas (1) – 14:20		Third period	8:12 – Brett Sutter (1)
Jhonas Enroth 37 saves / 38 shots		Goalie stats	Jack Flinn 8 saves / 11 shots Jack Campbell 14 saves / 15 shots

San Diego wins series 3–2

== Division finals ==
=== Eastern Conference ===
==== (A3) Hershey Bears vs. (A4) Providence Bruins ====
May 6	Hershey Bears	1 – 3	Providence Bruins	Giant Center	Recap
No scoring		First period	10:08 – Austin Czarnik (1); 13:37 – sh – Colby Cave (1); 14:33 – sh – Jake DeBrusk (4)
No scoring		Second period	No scoring
Nathan Walker (2) – 17:34		Third period	No scoring
Pheonix Copley 19 saves / 22 shots		Goalie stats	Zane McIntyre 24 saves / 25 shots

May 7	Hershey Bears	3 – 2	OT	Providence Bruins	Giant Center	Recap
No scoring		First period		No scoring
Madison Bowey (1) – 5:01		Second period		8:45 – Wayne Simpson (2); 15:14 – Wayne Simpson (3)
Christian Djoos (2) – pp – 17:30		Third period		No scoring
Travis Boyd (1) – 5:44		First overtime period		No scoring
Pheonix Copley 25 saves / 27 shots		Goalie stats		Zane McIntyre 25 saves / 28 shots

May 11	Providence Bruins	1 – 2	OT	Hershey Bears	Dunkin' Donuts Center	Recap
Chris Casto (1) – 8:47		First period		No scoring
No scoring		Second period		No scoring
No scoring		Third period		1:42 – pp – Chris Bourque (3)
No scoring		First overtime period		7:14 – pp – Chris Bourque (4)
Zane McIntyre 13 saves / 15 shots		Goalie stats		Pheonix Copley 39 saves / 40 shots

May 12	Providence Bruins	2 – 1	Hershey Bears	Dunkin' Donuts Center	Recap
No scoring		First period	No scoring
Alex Grant (1) – pp – 2:04; Chris Porter (3) – 19:18		Second period	5:51 – Dustin Gazley (1)
No scoring		Third period	No scoring
Zane McIntyre 10 saves / 11 shots		Goalie stats	Pheonix Copley 28 saves / 30 shots Vitek Vanecek 9 saves / 9 shots

May 14	Providence Bruins	2 – 3	OT	Hershey Bears	Dunkin' Donuts Center	Recap
No scoring		First period		11:12 – Chris Bourque (5)
Tommy Cross (2) – 3:59		Second period		8:29 – Paul Carey (1)
Austin Czarnik (2) – 9:18		Third period		No scoring
No scoring		First overtime period		1:58 – Madison Bowey (2)
Zane McIntyre 14 saves / 17 shots		Goalie stats		Vitek Vanecek 29 saves / 31 shots

May 16	Hershey Bears	2 – 4	Providence Bruins	Giant Center	Recap
Chandler Stephenson (2) – pp – 5:02; Chris Bourque (6) – 19:30		First period	No scoring
No scoring		Second period	0:37 – Danton Heinen (5); 6:18 – Colton Hargrove (2); 19:37 – Chris Porter (4)
No scoring		Third period	12:04 – Austin Czarnik (3)
Vitek Vanecek 30 saves / 34 shots		Goalie stats	Zane McIntyre 26 saves / 28 shots

May 17	Hershey Bears	2 – 4	Providence Bruins	Giant Center	Recap
Riley Barber (1) – 8:56		First period	6:50 – Jordan Szwarz (2)
Chandler Stephenson (3) – pp – 16:16		Second period	5:41 – Jordan Szwarz (3); 12:31 – Wayne Simpson (4)
No scoring		Third period	19:01 – en – Jake DeBrusk (5)
Vitek Vanecek 23 saves / 26 shots		Goalie stats	Zane McIntyre 15 saves / 17 shots

Providence wins series 4–3

==== (N1) Syracuse Crunch vs. (N2) Toronto Marlies ====
May 5	Syracuse Crunch	3 – 1	Toronto Marlies	Oncenter War Memorial Arena	Recap
Erik Condra (3) – pp – 14:40		First period	1:39 – Andreas Johnsson (2)
Byron Froese (2) – 16:15		Second period	No scoring
Yanni Gourde (1) – en – 18:43		Third period	No scoring
Mike McKenna 24 saves / 25 shots		Goalie stats	Kasimir Kaskisuo 26 saves / 28 shots

May 6	Syracuse Crunch	8 – 5	Toronto Marlies	Oncenter War Memorial Arena	Recap
Cory Conacher (2) – sh – 3:27; Michael Bournival (1) – 4:48; Matthew Peca (1) – 9:30; Tye McGinn (3) – pp – 19:39		First period	15:15 – Andreas Johnsson (3)
Joel Vermin (2) – 2:29; Matthew Peca (2) – 4:00		Second period	8:15 – pp – Cal O'Reilly (1); 12:00 – pp – Kasperi Kapanen (1)
Cory Conacher (3) – sh – 11:58; Joel Vermin (3) – en – 16:18		Third period	10:46 – pp – Carl Grundstrom (1); 18:56 – Seth Griffith (1)
Mike McKenna 14 saves / 19 shots		Goalie stats	Kasimir Kaskisuo 13 saves / 18 shots Antoine Bibeau 15 saves / 17 shots

May 9	Toronto Marlies	5 – 3	Syracuse Crunch	Ricoh Coliseum	Recap
No scoring		First period	11:44 – Adam Erne (1)
Andreas Johnsson – pp – (4) 10:07; Andreas Johnsson – (5) 13:52		Second period	1:54 – pp – Byron Froese (3)
Brendan Leipsic (3) – 18:04; Carl Grundstrom (2) – 18:22; Kasperi Kapanen (2) – 18:37		Third period	9:05 – Erik Condra (4)
Kasimir Kaskisuo 22 saves / 25 shots		Goalie stats	Mike McKenna 27 saves / 30 shots

May 10	Toronto Marlies	3 – 2	Syracuse Crunch	Ricoh Coliseum	Recap
Richard Clune (1) – 5:51; Kerby Rychel (2) – pp – 8:05; Trevor Moore (2) – pp – 16:24		First period	4:45 – Adam Erne (2)
No scoring		Second period	2:23 – Ben Thomas (1)
No scoring		Third period	No scoring
Kasimir Kaskisuo 17 saves / 19 shots		Goalie stats	Mike McKenna 12 saves / 15 shots Kristers Gudlevskis 14 saves / 14 shots

May 13	Syracuse Crunch	5 – 1	Toronto Marlies	Oncenter War Memorial Arena	Recap
Matthew Peca (5) – 11:24		First period	8:26 – Steven Oleksy (1)
Joel Vermin (4) – 3:18; Kevin Lynch (1) – 9:25		Second period	No scoring
Jonathan Racine (1) – sh – 1:35; Gabriel Dumont (2) – en – 16:22		Third period	No scoring
Mike McKenna 26 saves / 27 shots		Goalie stats	Kasimir Kaskisuo 18 saves / 22 shots

May 15	Toronto Marlies	2 – 1	Syracuse Crunch	Ricoh Coliseum	Recap
No scoring		First period	No scoring
Carl Grundstrom (3) – pp – 7:24		Second period	2:09 – Michael Bournival (2)
Andrew Nielsen (1) – pp – 11:33		Third period	No scoring
Kasimir Kaskisuo 27 saves / 28 shots		Goalie stats	Mike McKenna 23 saves / 25 shots

May 17	Syracuse Crunch	6 – 3	Toronto Marlies	Oncenter War Memorial Arena	Recap
Gabriel Dumont (3) – 6:26		First period	17:37 – Seth Griffith (2); 18:57 – Brendan Leipsic (4)
Matt Taormina (2) – 13:30; Adam Erne (3) – pp – 15:14		Second period	11:03 – Andreas Johnsson (6)
Matthew Peca (4) – 0:08; Cory Conacher (4) – 18:19; Yanni Gourde (2) – en – 19:29		Third period	No scoring
Mike McKenna 14 saves / 17 shots		Goalie stats	Kasimir Kaskisuo 24 saves / 29 shots

Syracuse wins series 4–3

=== Western Conference ===
==== (C1) Chicago Wolves vs. (C2) Grand Rapids Griffins ====
May 3	Chicago Wolves	1 – 4	Grand Rapids Griffins	Allstate Arena	Recap
Kenny Agostino (3) – 9:25		First period	0:40 – Martin Frk (1); 8:07 – pp – Matthew Ford (3)
No scoring		Second period	No scoring
No scoring		Third period	3:48 – Tomas Nosek (3); 18:09 – en – Ben Street (1)
Ville Husso 31 saves / 34 shots		Goalie stats	Jared Coreau 27 saves / 28 shots

May 5	Chicago Wolves	7 – 3	Grand Rapids Griffins	Allstate Arena	Recap
Petteri Lindbohm (1) – 3:10; Brett Sterling (1) – 9:44; Jake Walman (2) – pp – 3:10		First period	No scoring
No scoring		Second period	8:37 – Kyle Criscuolo (2); 19:45 – pp – Evgeny Svechnikov (2)
MacKenzie MacEachern (1) – 3:49; Tage Thompson (1) – pp – 12:01; Andrew Agozzino (2) – sh – 15:08; Vince Dunn (1) – pp – 17:31		Third period	8:45 – pp – Matt Lorito (3)
Ville Husso 28 saves / 31 shots		Goalie stats	Jared Coreau 24 saves / 31 shots

May 6	Grand Rapids Griffins	4 – 2	Chicago Wolves	Van Andel Arena	Recap
Matthew Ford (4) – pp – 5:09; Ben Street (2) – 10:00; Tyler Bertuzzi (3) – 10:30		First period	No scoring
No scoring		Second period	No scoring
Joe Hicketts (1) – 6:38		Third period	4:10 – Chris Butler (1); 6:22 – MacKenzie MacEachern (2)
Jared Coreau 27 saves / 29 shots		Goalie stats	Ville Husso 6 saves / 9 shots Jordan Binnington 30 saves / 31 shots

May 8	Grand Rapids Griffins	6 – 3	Chicago Wolves	Van Andel Arena	Recap
Mitch Callahan (1) – 15:05		First period	No scoring
Kyle Criscuolo (3) – 2:17; Martin Frk (2) – 9:44; Mitch Callahan (2) – 19:58		Second period	4:31 – Kenny Agostino (4); 8:30 – Kenny Agostino (5)
Matt Lorito (4) – 8:52; Mitch Callahan (3) – pp, en – 19:10		Third period	2:42 – Tage Thompson (2)
Jared Coreau 22 saves / 25 shots		Goalie stats	Ville Husso 31 saves / 36 shots

May 13	Chicago Wolves	2 – 5	Grand Rapids Griffins	Allstate Arena	Recap
Andrew Agozzino (3) – 6:43		First period	2:08 – Evgeny Svechnikov (3)
No scoring		Second period	3:53 – Tyler Bertuzzi (4); 15:51 – pp – Tomas Nosek (4); 18:31 – Kyle Criscuolo (4)
Samuel Blais (3) – 3:35		Third period	0:30 – Tyler Bertuzzi (5)
Ville Husso 20 saves / 24 shots Jordan Binnington 8 saves / 9 shots		Goalie stats	Jared Coreau 22 saves / 24 shots

Grand Rapids wins series 4–1

==== (P1) San Jose Barracuda vs. (P2) San Diego Gulls ====
May 5	San Jose Barracuda	2 – 3	OT	San Diego Gulls	SAP Center	Recap
Joakim Ryan (3) – 9:35		First period		17:46 – Kalle Kossila (2)
No scoring		Second period		No scoring
Ryan Carpenter (5) – 12:08		Third period		16:04 – Nate Guenin (1)
No scoring		First overtime period		0:38 – Kevin Roy (2)
Troy Grosenick 13 saves / 16 shots		Goalie stats		Jhonas Enroth 36 saves / 38 shots

May 6	San Jose Barracuda	5 – 1	San Diego Gulls	SAP Center	Recap
Nick DeSimone (1) – 4:31; Ryan Carpenter (6) – pp – 7:13		First period	No scoring
Buddy Robinson (4) – 1:10; Adam Helewka (1) – pp – 16:15		Second period	3:53 – Sam Carrick (2)
Barclay Goodrow (2) – 0:40		Third period	No scoring
Troy Grosenick 31 saves / 32 shots		Goalie stats	Jhonas Enroth 30 saves / 35 shots Dustin Tokarski 7 saves / 7 shots

May 10	San Diego Gulls	3 – 4	OT	San Jose Barracuda	Valley View Casino Center	Recap
Max Jones (1) – 16:32		First period		17:25 – Kevin Labanc (2)
Sam Carrick (3) – 7:24		Second period		No scoring
Spencer Abbott (1) – 16:40		Third period		12:49 – Colin Blackwell (1); 18:59 – Danny O'Regan (3)
No scoring		First overtime period		17:40 – Timo Meier (4)
Jhonas Enroth 45 saves / 49 shots		Goalie stats		Troy Grosenick 32 saves / 35 shots

May 12	San Diego Gulls	3 – 4	San Jose Barracuda	Valley View Casino Center	Recap
No scoring		First period	12:44 – pp – Barclay Goodrow (3); 18:47 – pp – Ryan Carpenter (7)
Mitch Hults (1) – 13:29		Second period	11:30 – Colin Blackwell (2); 15:58 – pp – Tim Heed (3)
Nic Kerdiles (4) – pp – 3:35; Sam Carrick (4) – 19:43		Third period	No scoring
Jhonas Enroth 15 saves / 19 shots Dustin Tokarski 7 saves / 7 shots		Goalie stats	Troy Grosenick 29 saves / 32 shots

May 13	San Diego Gulls	0 – 2	San Jose Barracuda	Valley View Casino Center	Recap
No scoring		First period	10:24 – Barclay Goodrow (4)
No scoring		Second period	14:00 – pp – Adam Helewka (2)
No scoring		Third period	No scoring
Jhonas Enroth 33 saves / 35 shots		Goalie stats	Troy Grosenick 34 saves / 34 shots

San Jose wins series 4–1

== Conference finals ==
=== Eastern Conference ===
==== (A4) Providence Bruins vs. (N1) Syracuse Crunch ====
May 19	Providence Bruins	3 – 6	Syracuse Crunch	Dunkin' Donuts Center	Recap
No scoring		First period	3:57 – Tye McGinn (4); 12:20 – Michael Bournival (3)
Alex Grant (2) – 4:37		Second period	6:56 – pp – Joel Vermin (5)
Jake DeBrusk (6) – 12:56; Danton Heinen (6) – 13:09		Third period	4:13 – Gabriel Dumont (4); 18:25 – en – Yanni Gourde (3); 19:38 – en – Byron Froese (4)
Zane McIntyre 19 saves / 23 shots		Goalie stats	Mike McKenna 33 saves / 36 shots

May 21	Providence Bruins	2 – 1	OT	Syracuse Crunch	Dunkin' Donuts Center	Recap
No scoring		First period		1:26 – Ben Thomas (2)
Jordan Szwarz (4) – pp – 16:47		Second period		No scoring
No scoring		Third period		No scoring
Jordan Szwarz (5) – 8:28		First overtime period		No scoring
Zane McIntyre 29 saves / 30 shots		Goalie stats		Mike McKenna 34 saves / 36 shots

May 24	Syracuse Crunch	5 – 4	Providence Bruins	Oncenter War Memorial Arena	Recap
Cory Conacher (5) – pp – 8:19; Michael Bournival (4) – 14:18		First period	No scoring
Matt Taormina (3) – 4:48		Second period	17:35 – Danton Heinen (7)
Yanni Gourde (4) – 3:59; Cory Conacher (6) – en – 17:52		Third period	16:49 – Anton Blidh (1); 17:11 – Danton Heinen (8); 19:09 – sh – Ryan Fitzgerald (1)
Mike McKenna 37 saves / 41 shots		Goalie stats	Zane McIntyre 12 saves / 15 shots Malcolm Subban 21 saves / 22 shots

May 26	Syracuse Crunch	7 – 2	Providence Bruins	Oncenter War Memorial Arena	Recap
Ben Thomas (3) – 3:57; Matt Taormina (4) – pp – 19:49		First period	7:07 – Jordan Szwarz (6)
Michael Bournival (5) – 0:33; Yanni Gourde (5) – 4:31; Michael Bournival (6) – 16:00; Gabriel Dumont (5) – 19:13		Second period	1:55 – pp – Danton Heinen (9)
Cory Conacher (7) – pp – 4:31		Third period	No scoring
Mike McKenna 33 saves / 35 shots		Goalie stats	Zane McIntyre 24 saves / 30 shots Malcolm Subban 9 saves / 10 shots

May 27	Syracuse Crunch	3 – 1	Providence Bruins	Oncenter War Memorial Arena	Recap
Ben Thomas (4) – 0:41		First period	No scoring
No scoring		Second period	13:27 – Chris Porter (5)
Cory Conacher (8) – 14:54; Cory Conacher (9) – en – 19:01		Third period	No scoring
Mike McKenna 27 saves / 28 shots		Goalie stats	Malcolm Subban 29 saves / 31 shots

Syracuse wins series 4–1

=== Western Conference ===
==== (P1) San Jose Barracuda vs. (C2) Grand Rapids Griffins ====
May 20	San Jose Barracuda	1 – 3	Grand Rapids Griffins	SAP Center	Recap
Kevin Labanc (3) – 10:34		First period	6:45 – Mitch Callahan (4); 9:53 – Ben Street (3)
No scoring		Second period	No scoring
No scoring		Third period	10:58 – pp – Kyle Criscuolo (5)
Troy Grosenick 25 saves / 28 shots		Goalie stats	Jared Coreau 26 saves / 27 shots

May 21	San Jose Barracuda	4 – 2	Grand Rapids Griffins	SAP Center	Recap
Julius Bergman (1) – pp – 3:35; Ryan Carpenter (8) – pp – 10:44		First period	17:10 – Tomas Nosek (5)
Joakim Ryan (4) – pp – 15:28		Second period	14:38 – pp – Matthew Ford (6)
Barclay Goodrow (5) – en – 18:54		Third period	No scoring
Troy Grosenick 33 saves / 35 shots		Goalie stats	Jared Coreau 36 saves / 39 shots

May 24	Grand Rapids Griffins	4 – 2	San Jose Barracuda	Van Andel Arena	Recap
Nathan Paetsch (1) – 13:47		First period	5:19 – John McCarthy (2); 15:00 – Ryan Carpenter (9)
No scoring		Second period	No scoring
Matt Lorito (5) – pp – 6:40; Mitch Callahan (5) – 16:20; Tomas Nosek (6) – en – 19:01		Third period	No scoring
Jared Coreau 31 saves / 33 shots		Goalie stats	Troy Grosenick 38 saves / 41 shots

May 26	Grand Rapids Griffins	6 – 2	San Jose Barracuda	Van Andel Arena	Recap
No scoring		First period	13:57 – ps – Colin Blackwell (3)
Tyler Bertuzzi (6) – 4:07; Eric Tangradi (2) – 9:42; Tomas Nosek (7) – pp – 12:39; Martin Frk (3) – 17:21		Second period	No scoring
Ben Street (4) – 3:48; Evgeny Svechnikov (4) – pp – 17:17		Third period	2:58 – pp – Adam Helewka (3)
Jared Coreau 26 saves / 28 shots		Goalie stats	Troy Grosenick 30 saves / 36 shots

May 27	Grand Rapids Griffins	4 – 2	San Jose Barracuda	Van Andel Arena	Recap
Brian Lashoff (1) – 0:24; Matthew Ford (7) – 16:11		First period	No scoring
Matt Lorito (6) – pp – 11:42		Second period	1:02 – Timo Meier (4)
Matt Lorito (7) – 4:53		Third period	15:29 – Danny O'Regan (4)
Jared Coreau 39 saves / 41 shots		Goalie stats	Troy Grosenick 22 saves / 26 shots

Grand Rapids wins series 4–1

== Calder Cup Finals ==
=== Syracuse Crunch vs. Grand Rapids Griffins ===
June 2	Grand Rapids Griffins	3 – 2	Syracuse Crunch	Van Andel Arena	Recap
Tomas Nosek (8) – 4:56		First period	9:25 – sh – Kevin Lynch (2)
Nathan Paetsch (2) – 17:12		Second period	0:54 – Joel Vermin (6)
Tomas Nosek (9) – pp – 19:46		Third period	No scoring
Jared Coreau 22 saves / 24 shots		Goalie stats	Mike McKenna 33 saves / 36 shots

June 3	Grand Rapids Griffins	6 – 5	2OT	Syracuse Crunch	Van Andel Arena	Recap
Martin Frk (4) – pp – 5:27; Ben Street (5) – 12:29		First period		10:37 – Yanni Gourde (6)
Evgeny Svechnikov (5) – pp – 12:53		Second period		4:30 – Joel Vermin (7); 5:41 – Erik Condra (5)
Tomas Nosek (10) – pp – 0:24; Tyler Bertuzzi (7) – 13:36		Third period		7:47 – pp – Cory Conacher (10); 15:15 – Michael Bournival (7)
Ben Street (6) – 7:02		Second overtime period		No scoring
Jared Coreau 50 saves / 55 shots		Goalie stats		Mike McKenna 45 saves / 51 shots

June 7	Syracuse Crunch	5 – 3	Grand Rapids Griffins	Oncenter War Memorial Arena	Recap
Byron Froese (5) – 7:00; Joel Vermin (8) – 15:31; Joel Vermin (9) – pp – 16:28		First period	9:17 – Tyler Bertuzzi (8)
Tye McGinn (5) – pp – 13:22; Cory Conacher (11) – 15:18		Second period	6:58 – Dominic Turgeon (1); 16:38 – Kyle Criscuolo (5)
No scoring		Third period	No scoring
Mike McKenna 32 saves / 35 shots		Goalie stats	Jared Coreau 27 saves / 32 shots

June 9	Syracuse Crunch	2 – 3	Grand Rapids Griffins	Oncenter War Memorial Arena	Recap
No scoring		First period	10:00 – Ben Street (7); 17:48 – Dan Renouf (1)
Yanni Gourde (7) – 11:45		Second period	10:33 – Dan Renouf (2)
Michael Bournival (8) – 7:29		Third period	No scoring
Mike McKenna 32 saves / 35 shots		Goalie stats	Jared Coreau 31 saves / 33 shots

June 10	Syracuse Crunch	5 – 1	Grand Rapids Griffins	Oncenter War Memorial Arena	Recap
Kevin Lynch (3) – 0:17; Mathieu Brodeur (1) – 4:33; Byron Froese (6) – 14:05; Cory Conacher (12) – pp – 17:19; Ben Thomas (5) – 19:16		First period	No scoring
No scoring		Second period	No scoring
No scoring		Third period	5:58 – Ben Street (8)
Mike McKenna 36 saves / 37 shots		Goalie stats	Jared Coreau 7 saves / 12 shots Edward Pasquale 19 saves / 19 shots

June 13	Grand Rapids Griffins	4 – 3	Syracuse Crunch	Van Andel Arena	Recap
No scoring		First period	14:09 – Yanni Gourde (8)
Matthew Ford (8) – pp – 0:18; Mitch Callahan (6) – 11:50		Second period	7:51 – Matt Taormina (5); 18:10 – Yanni Gourde (9)
Tyler Bertuzzi (9) – 3:50; Martin Frk (5) – 12:41		Third period	No scoring
Jared Coreau 29 saves / 32 shots		Goalie stats	Mike McKenna 22 saves / 26 shots

Grand Rapids wins series 4–2

== Playoff statistical leaders ==
=== Leading skaters ===
These are the top ten skaters based on points. If there is a tie in points, goals take precedence over assists.

GP = Games played; G = Goals; A = Assists; Pts = Points; +/– = Plus–minus; PIM = Penalty minutes

Player	Team	GP	G	A	Pts	PIM
Cory Conacher	Syracuse Crunch	22	12	16	28	27
Yanni Gourde	Syracuse Crunch	22	9	18	27	29
Tomas Nosek	Grand Rapids Griffins	19	10	12	22	18
Ben Street	Grand Rapids Griffins	19	8	13	21	2
Matt Taormina	Syracuse Crunch	22	5	15	20	11
Tyler Bertuzzi	Grand Rapids Griffins	19	9	10	19	50
Eric Tangradi	Grand Rapids Griffins	19	2	17	19	12
Danton Heinen	Providence Bruins	17	9	9	18	0
Ryan Carpenter	San Jose Barracuda	15	9	8	17	8
Mitch Callahan	Grand Rapids Griffins	19	6	10	16	18

=== Leading goaltenders ===
This is a combined table of the top five goaltenders based on goals against average and the top five goaltenders based on save percentage with at least 240 minutes played. The table is initially sorted by goals against average, with the criterion for inclusion in bold.

GP = Games played; W = Wins; L = Losses; SA = Shots against; GA = Goals against; GAA = Goals against average; SV% = Save percentage; SO = Shutouts; TOI = Time on ice (in minutes)

Player	Team	GP	W	L	SA	GA	GAA	SV%	SO	TOI
Jack Campbell	Ontario Reign	5	2	2	121	8	**1.70**	**.934**	0	282:14
Pheonix Copley	Hershey Bears	9	5	4	282	19	**2.13**	**.933**	1	534:23
Mackenzie Blackwood	Albany Devils	4	1	3	125	9	**2.13**	**.928**	1	254:06
Charlie Lindgren	St. John's IceCaps	4	1	3	129	10	**2.21**	**.922**	0	272:04
Zane McIntyre	Providence Bruins	16	8	7	426	40	**2.57**	.906	0	932:36
Jhonas Enroth	San Diego Gulls	10	4	6	341	26	2.69	**.924**	0	580:29

Preceded by 2016 Calder Cup playoffs	Calder Cup playoffs 2017	Succeeded by 2018 Calder Cup playoffs
