= Matt Taormina =

American professional ice hockey player

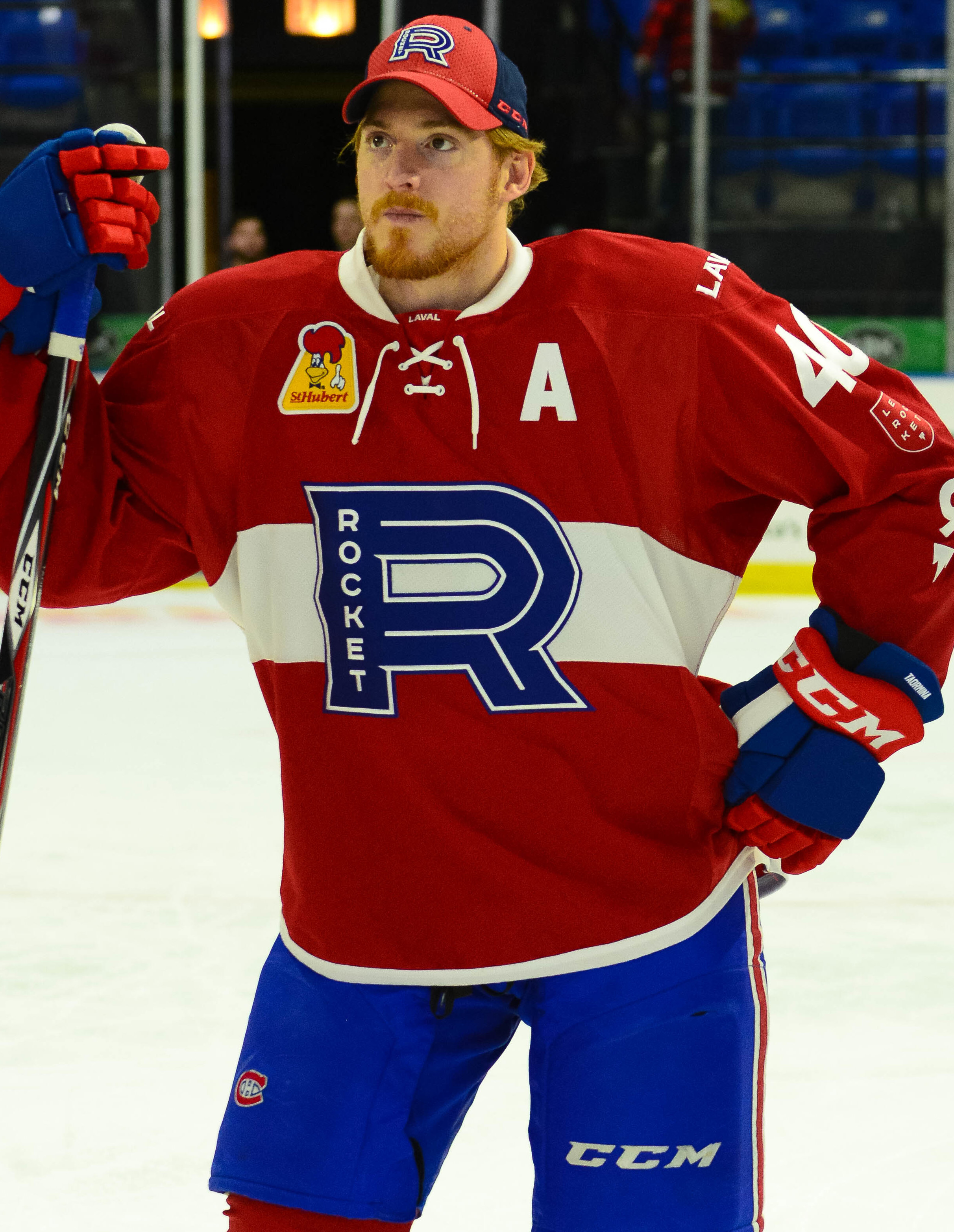
- Taormina with the Laval Rocket in 2018
- Born: October 20, 1986 (age 39) Warren, Michigan, U.S.
- Height: 5 ft 10 in (178 cm)
- Weight: 185 lb (84 kg; 13 st 3 lb)
- Position: Defense
- Shot: Left
- Played for: New Jersey Devils; Tampa Bay Lightning
- NHL draft: Undrafted
- Playing career: 2009–2019

Matthew Angelo Taormina (born October 20, 1986) is an American former professional ice hockey defenseman. Originally undrafted by teams in the National Hockey League (NHL), he played for the New Jersey Devils and Tampa Bay Lightning.

== Playing career ==
As a youth, Taormina played in the 2000 Quebec International Pee-Wee Hockey Tournament with the Detroit Honeybaked minor ice hockey team.

Taormina began his amateur career playing in the North American Hockey League with the Texarkana Bandits. Earning a place in the Second All-Star Team, the All-Rookie Team and winning the NAHL's Rookie of the year, Matt then committed to play collegiate hockey in the Hockey East with Providence College. With a selection to the Hockey East Second All-Star Team as a junior, Matt progressed to join the Binghamton Senators of the American Hockey League after completing his senior year at the end of the 2008–09 season.

As an undrafted free agent, Taormina was signed to an AHL contract for the 2009–10 season by the New Jersey Devils on August 20, 2009. Taormina scored 50 points in 75 games to lead the Lowell Devils in assists and signed a one-year contract extension with the Devils on February 26, 2010.

With an impressive training camp and with the advantage of familiarity under head coach John MacLean with Lowell, Matt opened the 2010–11 season on the New Jersey Devils roster. In his fifth game, Matt scored his first NHL goal on October 15, 2010, a powerplay goal, against Craig Anderson of the Colorado Avalanche in a 3-2 defeat.

Taormina signed a one-year two-way contract with the Tampa Bay Lightning of the NHL on July 6, 2012.

In his second season with Tampa Bay, at the 2013–14 trade deadline, Taormina was traded by the Lightning, along with Dana Tyrell, to the Columbus Blue Jackets in exchange for Jonathan Marchessault and Dalton Smith on March 5, 2014.

On September 26, 2014, the Worcester Sharks announced they had signed Taormina to a one-year AHL contract. In the 2014–15 season, Taormina returned to form to lead the Sharks in scoring from the blueline with 38 points in 72 games.

On July 1, 2015, Taormina returned to the Tampa Bay Lightning, in signing a one-year, two-way contract as a free agent. On April 19, 2016, Taormina played in first career Stanley Cup Playoffs game, which was a 3-2 Lightning win over the Detroit Red Wings.

On June 28, 2016 the Lightning announced the re-signing of Taormina to a one-year, two-way contract. Taormina skated in three games with the Lighting that season. Taormina also skated in three Stanley Cup playoff games in 2016. He also appeared in 61 games with the Crunch last season, recording 13 goals and 41 points. This ranked Taormina second among Crunch defensemen for points and led all defensemen for goals with 13.

On March 17, 2017, Taormina was named a permanent alternate captain of the Syracuse Crunch. On April 6, 2017, Taromina was named to the 2016–17 AHL All-Star First Team. On April 7, 2017, Taromina was awarded the Eddie Shore Award as the AHL's outstanding defenseman for the 2016–17 season.

On July 1, 2017, Taormina left the Lightning as a free agent and signed a two-year, two-way deal with the Montreal Canadiens. Near the beginning of the season, Taormina was named an alternate captain of the Laval Rocket along with Chris Terry, with Byron Froese being the first captain in the team’s history.

Prior to the 2018–19 season, and having missed pre-season through injury, on October 1, Taormina and Rinat Valiev were traded by the Canadiens to the Calgary Flames in exchange for Brett Kulak.

== Career statistics ==
			Regular season					Playoffs
Season	Team	League	GP	G	A	Pts	PIM	GP	G	A	Pts	PIM
2004–05	Texarkana Bandits	NAHL	52	14	30	44	44	—	—	—	—	—
2005–06	Providence College	HE	36	1	10	11	16	—	—	—	—	—
2006–07	Providence College	HE	35	5	2	7	6	—	—	—	—	—
2007–08	Providence College	HE	39	9	18	27	12	—	—	—	—	—
2008–09	Providence College	HE	34	5	15	20	16	—	—	—	—	—
2008–09	Binghamton Senators	AHL	11	2	3	5	4	—	—	—	—	—
2009–10	Lowell Devils	AHL	75	10	40	50	45	5	1	3	4	4
2010–11	New Jersey Devils	NHL	17	3	2	5	2	—	—	—	—	—
2011–12	New Jersey Devils	NHL	30	1	6	7	4	—	—	—	—	—
2011–12	Albany Devils	AHL	33	6	10	16	12	—	—	—	—	—
2012–13	Syracuse Crunch	AHL	55	4	20	24	21	18	2	10	12	4
2012–13	Tampa Bay Lightning	NHL	2	0	0	0	0	—	—	—	—	—
2013–14	Syracuse Crunch	AHL	41	6	12	18	20	—	—	—	—	—
2013–14	Tampa Bay Lightning	NHL	7	0	0	0	0	—	—	—	—	—
2013–14	Springfield Falcons	AHL	17	3	5	8	2	4	0	1	1	0
2014–15	Worcester Sharks	AHL	76	11	27	38	24	4	1	0	1	0
2015–16	Syracuse Crunch	AHL	61	13	28	41	10	—	—	—	—	—
2015–16	Tampa Bay Lightning	NHL	3	0	0	0	0	3	0	0	0	0
2016–17	Syracuse Crunch	AHL	70	15	45	60	22	22	5	15	20	11
2017–18	Laval Rocket	AHL	63	4	48	52	18	—	—	—	—	—
2018–19	Stockton Heat	AHL	31	0	7	7	14	—	—	—	—	—
AHL totals			533	74	245	319	192	53	9	29	38	19
NHL totals			59	4	8	12	6	3	0	0	0	0

== Awards and honors ==
Award	Year	Ref
NAHL
All-Rookie First Team	2005	
Rookie of the Year	2005	
College
All-Hockey East Second Team	2008	
AHL
All-Star Game	2015, 2016, 2017, 2018	
First Team All-Star	2017	
Eddie Shore Award	2017	
