= Ryan Carpenter =

American ice hockey player (born 1991)

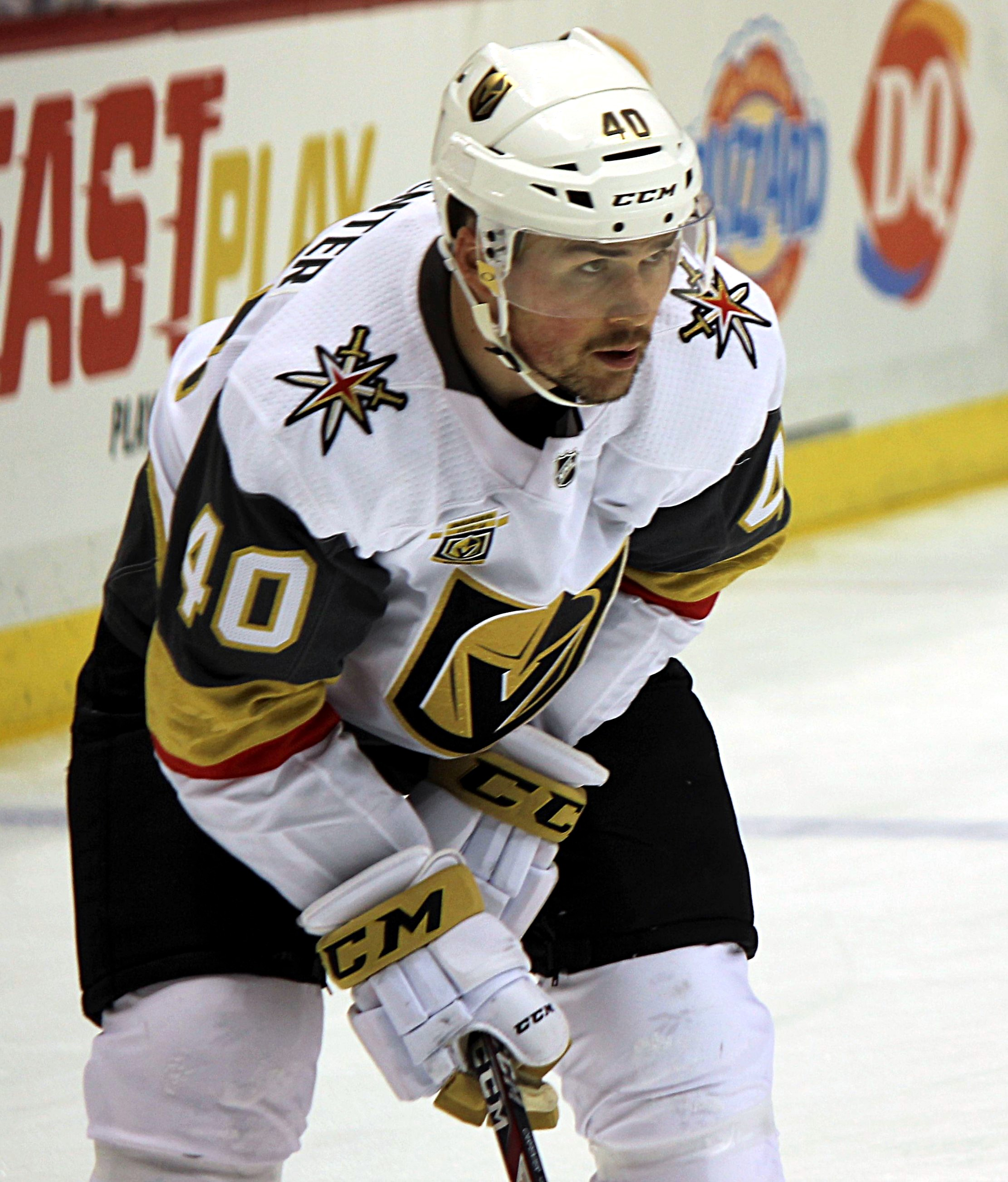
- Carpenter with the Vegas Golden Knights in 2018
- Born: January 18, 1991 (age 35) Oviedo, Florida, U.S.
- Height: 6 ft 1 in (185 cm)
- Weight: 198 lb (90 kg; 14 st 2 lb)
- Position: Center
- Shoots: Right
- AHL team Former teams: San Diego Gulls; San Jose Sharks; Vegas Golden Knights; Chicago Blackhawks; Calgary Flames; New York Rangers
- NHL draft: Undrafted
- Playing career: 2014–present

Ryan Michael Carpenter (born January 18, 1991) is an American professional ice hockey center for the San Diego Gulls of the American Hockey League (AHL). He previously played for the San Jose Sharks, Vegas Golden Knights, Chicago Blackhawks, Calgary Flames, and New York Rangers of the National Hockey League (NHL).

== Playing career ==
=== Amateur ===
He started his junior career with the Sioux City Musketeers in the United States Hockey League. He played two seasons with Sioux City and was one of the team's three co-captains. Recruited by Bowling Green State University (BGSU), he spent three years in the program, finishing with 37 goals and 42 assists in 100 career games and captained the team for his final two seasons. In his rookie year, he was awarded BGSU's rookie of the year award. In 2013, Carpenter was named to the Central Collegiate Hockey Association (CCHA) Second All-Star Team.

=== Professional ===
On March 26, 2014, he signed with the San Jose Sharks as an undrafted free agent, and joined their American Hockey League (AHL) affiliate, the Worcester Sharks. He appeared in 12 games with Worcester to finish the 2013–14 season, registering two points. In his first full professional season in 2014–15 with Worcester, he scored 12 goals, 22 assists and had 34 points in 74 games.

During his second full season in the AHL, now with the Sharks new affiliate, the San Jose Barracuda, in 2015–16, Carpenter led the team in points and assists through 20 games, and was called up by the San Jose Sharks on December 11, 2015. He made his NHL debut on the Sharks fourth line, in a 2–0 defeat to the Minnesota Wild the following day. With the Barracuda, Carpenter was named to the 2016 AHL All-Star Classic. He finished the season leading the team on points with 55 in 67 games (18 goals, 37 assists), and won the AHL's Yanick Dupre Memorial Award for community service. Helped by the Barracuda falling in the first round of the 2016 playoffs, Carpenter remained on the Sharks roster as a possible back-up, seeing the franchise reach the 2016 Stanley Cup Final.

He split 2016–17 season between the Sharks and the Barracuda. He appeared in 54 games with the Barracuda, scoring 14 goals and 39 points, good for sixth on the team. He was recalled by the Sharks on November 26, 2016 along with forward Barclay Goodrow and made his season debut that night in a 3–2 loss to the Anaheim Ducks that night, centering the fourth line. He scored his first NHL goal on November 30, 2016 against goaltender Peter Budaj, in a 4–1 victory over the Los Angeles Kings. He played in 11 games with the Sharks, scoring two goals and four points before being returned to the Barracuda. In the 2017 Calder Cup playoffs, Carpenter scored a shorthanded goal to in overtime to advance past the Stockton Heat to the second round. The team went to the Western Conference finals, and Carpenter led the team in playoff scoring with 17 points in 15 games.

The Sharks signed Carpenter to a two-year, $1.3 million contract extension on June 17, 2017. After appearing in 16 games with the Sharks during the 2017–18 season, during which he registered only a single assist, Carpenter was placed on waivers on December 12. Carpenter was claimed the next day by the Vegas Golden Knights. He made his Vegas debut on January 5, 2018 replacing forward Oscar Lindberg in the lineup, in a 5–4 victory over the Chicago Blackhawks. He scored his first goal for the Golden Knights against goaltender Philipp Grubauer and have his first NHL career multi-point game, earning an assist too, in a 4–3 victory over the Washington Capitals on February 4. He finished the season with 9 goals and 14 points in 36 games with the Golden Knights. Vegas would advance all the way to the 2018 Stanley Cup Final where they would lose Washington Capitals in five games. In 17 playoff games, Carpenter registered five assists.

In the 2018–19 season, Carpenter appeared in 68 games with Vegas, scoring 5 goals and 18 points. After playing for the Golden Knights in the franchise's first two seasons, Carpenter left as an unrestricted free agent to sign a three-year, $3 million contract with the Chicago Blackhawks on July 1, 2019. He made his Blackhawks debut in the opening game of the season, held in Prague, Czech Republic, a 4–3 loss to the Philadelphia Flyers on October 4. He scored his first goal as a Blackhawk against Tuukka Rask in a 4–3 overtime win over the Boston Bruins on December 15. In the 2019–20 season, Carpenter played in 69 games, scoring 3 goals and 15 points. The season was cut short play was suspended due to the COVID-19 pandemic on March 12. When play resumed in August, Chicago took part in qualifying for the 2020 Stanley Cup playoffs. The Blackhawks defeated the Edmonton Oilers in the qualifying round, but fell to the Vegas Golden Knights in the first round. Carpenter played in all nine playoff games, registering one assist.

In the pandemic-shortened 2020–21 season, Carpenter appeared in 40 games, scoring 4 goals and 5 points. In the 2021–22 season, he played in 59 games with Chicago, scoring three goals and 11 points. The Blackhawks traded Carpenter to the Calgary Flames in exchange for a 2024 fifth-round draft pick at the NHL trade deadline on March 21, 2022. He made his Flames debut in a 9–5 victory over the Edmonton Oilers on March 26, centering a line between Milan Lucic and Trevor Lewis. A few weeks later, Carpenter got his first point as a Flame, assisting on Johnny Gaudreau's game-winning goal in a 3–2 win over the Los Angeles Kings on April 4, 2022. He played in eight games with Calgary, registering just the one point.

As an unrestricted free agent from the Flames, Carpenter signed a one-year, $750,000 contract with the New York Rangers on July 14, 2022. He made his Rangers debut on October 10, in a 3–1 victory over the Tampa Bay Lightning, assisting on Barclay Goodrow's third period goal. He scored his first goal for the Rangers on November 13 against Connor Ingram in a 4–1 victory over the Arizona Coyotes. On December 8, after playing 21 games, scoring one goal and three points with New York, Carpenter was placed on waivers. He went unclaimed and was assigned to the Rangers' AHL affiliate, the Hartford Wolf Pack. In the AHL, he scored 21 goals and 44 points in 51 games. He was recalled on February 26, 2023, and appeared in one more game with New York, a 5–2 win over the Los Angeles Kings that night.

An unrestricted free agent again, on July 1, 2023, Carpenter returned to his original club, the San Jose Sharks, signing a one-year, two-way contract. He was assigned to the Barracuda to start the season, and was named one of the team's alternate captains. He appeared in five games with the Barracuda, scoring three goals and six points. He was recalled by the Sharks on October 26 after Alexander Barabanov was injured, He made his NHL season debut on October 27 in a 3–0 loss to the Carolina Hurricanes. After suffering an injury, he was placed on injured reserve by the Sharks on December 4 and missed ten games before being activated by the team on December 28. He finished the season with San Jose, appearing in 62 games, scoring 7 goals and 12 points.

After a season within the Sharks organization, Carpenter ended his second stint with the club in signing as a free agent to a two-year AHL contract with the San Diego Gulls, primary affiliate to the Anaheim Ducks on July 2, 2024.

== Personal life ==
Carpenter's family is from Staten Island, New York. Following in his father's footsteps, he was a New York Rangers fan as long as he can remember. Carpenter grew up in Orlando, Florida where he attended Timber Creek High School. In his youth hockey playing career he played for the Central Florida Hockey Club. He was a finance major while attending university.

Carpenter is a devout Christian and he participates in a chapter of Fellowship of Christian Athletes alongside Nick Holden. He is married to Alexis and they have three children together, two sons and a daughter.

== Career statistics ==
			Regular season					Playoffs
Season	Team	League	GP	G	A	Pts	PIM	GP	G	A	Pts	PIM
2007–08	Victory Honda 16U AAA	T1EHL	31	15	14	29	26	—	—	—	—	—
2008–09	Honeybaked 18U AAA	T1EHL	46	19	13	32	26	—	—	—	—	—
2009–10	Sioux City Musketeers	USHL	58	10	12	22	45	—	—	—	—	—
2010–11	Sioux City Musketeers	USHL	59	13	32	45	30	3	2	1	3	2
2011–12	Bowling Green State University	CCHA	44	11	10	30	31	—	—	—	—	—
2012–13	Bowling Green State University	CCHA	41	18	15	33	20	—	—	—	—	—
2013–14	Bowling Green State University	WCHA	15	8	8	16	0	—	—	—	—	—
2013–14	Worcester Sharks	AHL	12	0	2	2	8	—	—	—	—	—
2014–15	Worcester Sharks	AHL	74	12	22	34	40	4	1	2	3	2
2015–16	San Jose Barracuda	AHL	66	18	37	55	33	4	1	1	2	2
2015–16	San Jose Sharks	NHL	1	0	0	0	0	—	—	—	—	—
2016–17	San Jose Sharks	NHL	11	2	2	4	4	—	—	—	—	—
2016–17	San Jose Barracuda	AHL	54	14	25	39	24	15	9	8	17	8
2017–18	San Jose Sharks	NHL	16	0	1	1	2	—	—	—	—	—
2017–18	Vegas Golden Knights	NHL	36	9	5	14	9	17	0	5	5	6
2018–19	Vegas Golden Knights	NHL	68	5	13	18	8	—	—	—	—	—
2019–20	Chicago Blackhawks	NHL	69	3	12	15	28	9	0	1	1	0
2020–21	Chicago Blackhawks	NHL	40	4	1	5	19	—	—	—	—	—
2021–22	Chicago Blackhawks	NHL	59	3	8	11	36	—	—	—	—	—
2021–22	Calgary Flames	NHL	8	0	1	1	0	—	—	—	—	—
2022–23	New York Rangers	NHL	22	1	2	3	10	—	—	—	—	—
2022–23	Hartford Wolf Pack	AHL	51	21	23	44	28	9	2	3	5	4
2023–24	San Jose Barracuda	AHL	5	3	3	6	2	—	—	—	—	—
2023–24	San Jose Sharks	NHL	62	5	7	12	6	—	—	—	—	—
2024–25	San Diego Gulls	AHL	72	19	30	49	16	—	—	—	—	—
2025–26	San Diego Gulls	AHL	71	17	31	48	22	2	0	0	0	0
NHL totals			392	32	52	84	122	26	0	6	6	6

== Awards and honors ==
Award	Year
College
CCHA Second All-Star Team	2013
AHL
Yanick Dupre Memorial Award	2016
