= Brian Lashoff =

American ice hockey player (born 1990)

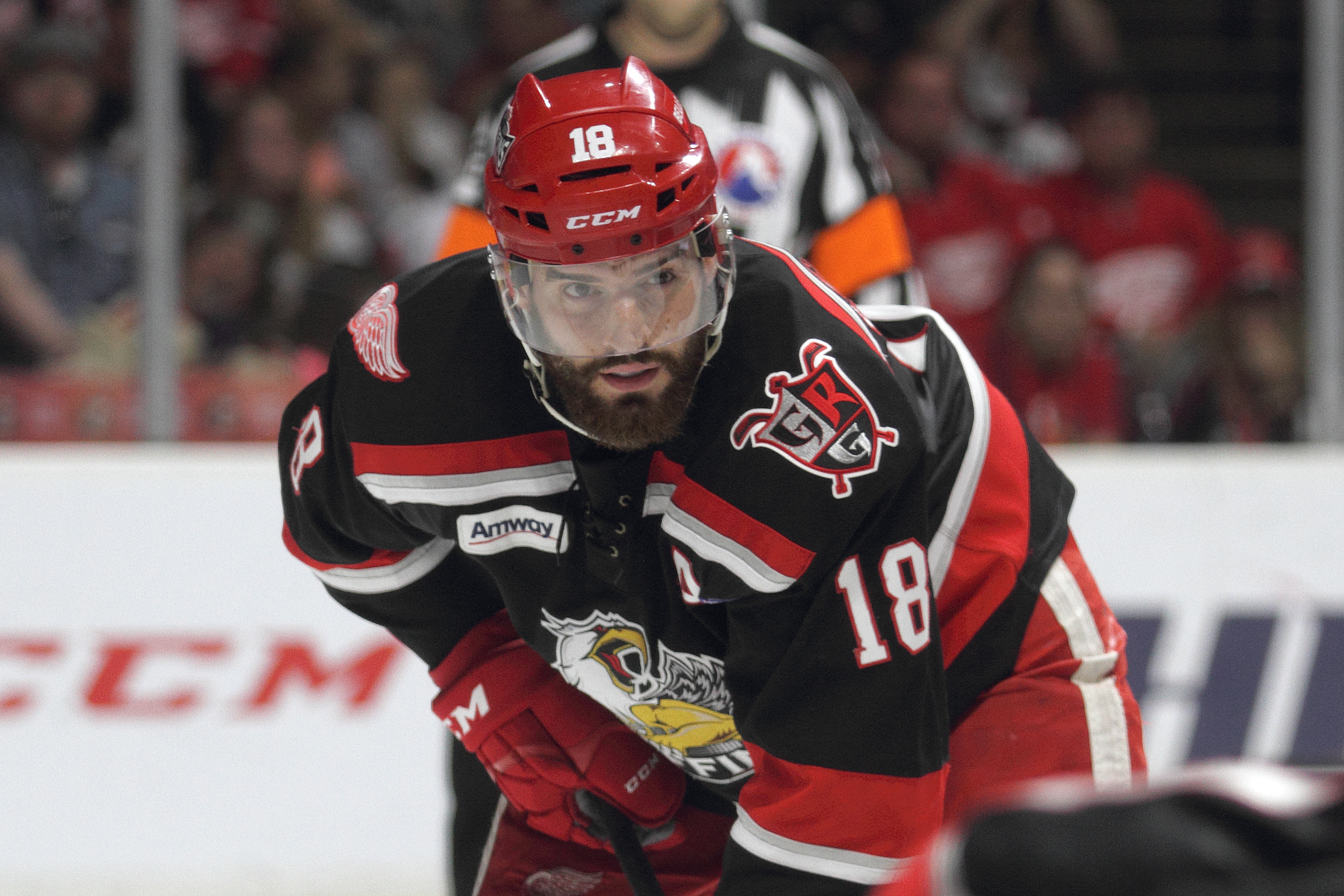
- Lashoff with the Grand Rapids Griffins in 2017
- Born: July 16, 1990 (age 36) East Greenbush, New York, U.S.
- Height: 6 ft 3 in (191 cm)
- Weight: 221 lb (100 kg; 15 st 11 lb)
- Position: Defense
- Shot: Left
- Played for: Detroit Red Wings
- NHL draft: Undrafted
- Playing career: 2009–2023

Brian Lashoff (born July 16, 1990) is an American former ice hockey defenseman and current assistant coach for the Grand Rapids Griffins of the American Hockey League (AHL). Lashoff played for the Detroit Red Wings of the National Hockey League (NHL), and most notably for the Grand Rapids Griffins of the AHL.

== Playing career ==
As a youth, Lashoff played in the 2003 Quebec International Pee-Wee Hockey Tournament with the New York Rangers minor ice hockey team.

Undrafted, Lashoff played major junior hockey in the Ontario Hockey League with the Barrie Colts and Kingston Frontenacs. On October 1, 2008 he was signed to an entry-level contract with the Detroit Red Wings organization following their 2008 training camp.

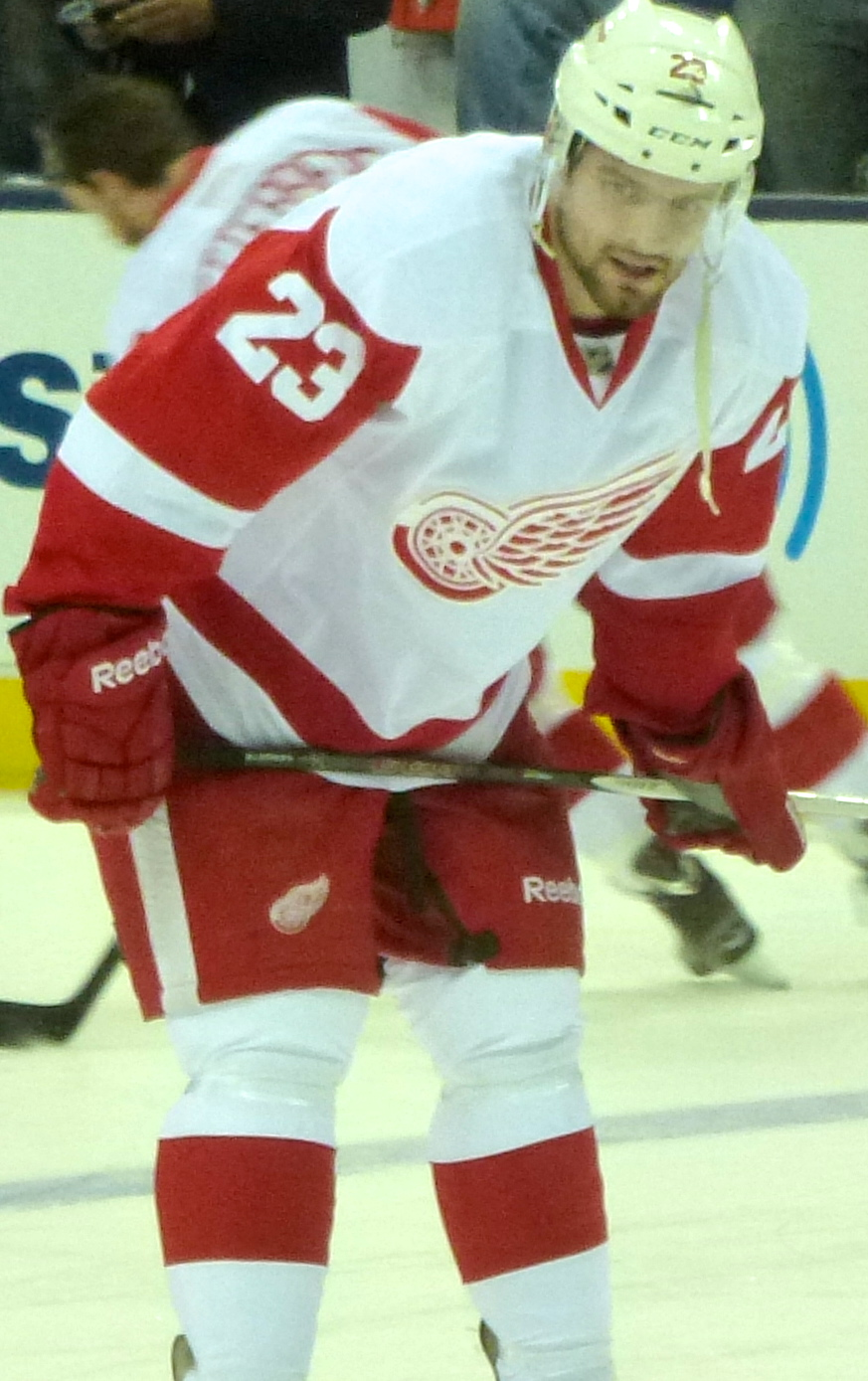
Lashoff during his first NHL game in 2013.

At the beginning of the lockout shortened 2012–13 season, Lashoff was recalled by the Red Wings after an injury to Jonathan Ericsson on January 21, 2013. He made his NHL debut the same day against the Columbus Blue Jackets, and scored his first goal in the second period against Sergei Bobrovsky.

On May 11, 2013, after being sent down from Detroit, Lashoff returned to the Grand Rapids Griffins to help them during their 2013 Calder Cup run. During the 2012–13 season, Lashoff recorded two goals and four assists in 37 regular season games, and one assist in 18 postseason games.

On January 30, 2015, Lashoff was placed on waivers by the Red Wings. After clearing waivers, Lashoff was assigned to the Grand Rapids Griffins. Prior to being placed on waivers, Lashoff appeared in 11 games for the Red Wings during the 2014–15 season, where he recorded two assists.

On June 16, 2016, the Red Wings signed Lashoff to a one-year contract extension. During the 2016–17 season, Lashoff recorded three goals and eights assists in 62 games during the regular season. During the 2017 Calder Cup playoffs, he recorded one goal and three assists in 17 playoffs games, and helped lead the Griffins to the Calder Cup.

On June 29, 2017, the Red Wings signed Lashoff to a two-year contract extension. On December 6, 2018, Lashoff was recalled by the Red Wings. Prior to being recalled, he recorded three assists in 17 games for the Griffins. On March 13, 2019, the Red Wings signed Lashoff to a two-year contract extension.

On December 27, 2019, the Red Wings recalled Lashoff from the Griffins. Prior to being recalled, he recorded two goals and 12 assists in 25 games for the Griffins.

On February 4, 2021, entering his twelfth year in the AHL, Lashoff was named the 17th captain in franchise history of the Grand Rapids Griffins before the commencement of the pandemic delayed 2020–21 season. Approaching the NHL trade deadline, Lashoff was involved in a three-way trade being initially dealt by the Red Wings to the Columbus Blue Jackets in exchange for David Savard before he was traded to the Tampa Bay Lightning in exchange for a 2021 first-round pick and a 2022 third-round pick on April 10, 2021. He was assigned to the Grand Rapids Griffins by the Lightning to continue his tenure as captain.

On July 30, 2021, the Red Wings signed Lashoff to a one-year contract. During the 2021–22 season, Lashoff played exclusively with the Griffins, and recorded five goals and 16 points in 67 games.

As the Griffins longest ever tenured player, Lashoff signed a one-year AHL contract on May 25, 2022, to return for a 14th season with the team. At the conclusion of the 2022–23 season, Lashoff ended his professional career and announced his retirement on April 12, 2023. He played more seasons in Grand Rapids than any pro athlete in the city’s history, spending all or part of 14 seasons with the Griffins including the last three as team captain. He finished his AHL career with 629 regular season games, ranking third all-time among players who have spent their entire career with one club.

== Post-playing career ==
On June 26, 2023, Lashoff was named an assistant coach for the Grand Rapids Griffins.

== International play ==
Medal record

Representing United States

Ice hockey

World Junior Championships
Gold medal – first place	2010 Saskatchewan	

Lashoff represented the United States at the 2010 World Junior Ice Hockey Championships where he recorded two assists in seven games, and won a gold medal.

== Personal ==
Brian's older brother, Matt, has also played professionally in the NHL and currently plays for the SCL Tigers of the National League A. Their first game played against each other in an organized league was December 22, 2010 when the Grand Rapids Griffins met the Toronto Marlies in an AHL game.

== Career statistics ==
=== Regular season and playoffs ===
			Regular season					Playoffs
Season	Team	League	GP	G	A	Pts	PIM	GP	G	A	Pts	PIM
2006–07	Barrie Colts	OHL	47	2	10	12	5	5	0	1	1	2
2007–08	Barrie Colts	OHL	50	5	15	20	44	8	0	1	1	4
2008–09	Barrie Colts	OHL	25	1	12	13	19	—	—	—	—	—
2008–09	Kingston Frontenacs	OHL	35	6	13	19	32	—	—	—	—	—
2008–09	Grand Rapids Griffins	AHL	6	1	4	5	0	8	1	4	5	2
2009–10	Kingston Frontenacs	OHL	58	6	21	27	71	7	0	0	0	12
2009–10	Grand Rapids Griffins	AHL	6	0	2	2	5	—	—	—	—	—
2010–11	Grand Rapids Griffins	AHL	37	0	3	3	25	—	—	—	—	—
2010–11	Toledo Walleye	ECHL	3	0	1	1	0	—	—	—	—	—
2011–12	Grand Rapids Griffins	AHL	76	8	11	19	41	—	—	—	—	—
2012–13	Grand Rapids Griffins	AHL	37	2	4	6	23	18	0	1	1	10
2012–13	Detroit Red Wings	NHL	31	1	4	5	15	3	0	0	0	0
2013–14	Detroit Red Wings	NHL	75	1	5	6	36	5	0	0	0	0
2014–15	Grand Rapids Griffins	AHL	32	1	6	7	12	16	0	3	3	8
2014–15	Detroit Red Wings	NHL	11	0	2	2	6	—	—	—	—	—
2015–16	Grand Rapids Griffins	AHL	71	1	15	16	30	9	2	1	3	0
2016–17	Grand Rapids Griffins	AHL	62	3	8	11	32	17	1	3	4	12
2016–17	Detroit Red Wings	NHL	5	0	0	0	0	—	—	—	—	—
2017–18	Grand Rapids Griffins	AHL	70	5	10	15	29	5	1	2	3	2
2017–18	Detroit Red Wings	NHL	1	0	0	0	0	—	—	—	—	—
2018–19	Grand Rapids Griffins	AHL	53	1	13	14	33	2	0	1	1	0
2018–19	Detroit Red Wings	NHL	4	0	1	1	2	—	—	—	—	—
2019–20	Grand Rapids Griffins	AHL	47	3	5	8	36	—	—	—	—	—
2019–20	Detroit Red Wings	NHL	9	0	1	1	6	—	—	—	—	—
2020–21	Grand Rapids Griffins	AHL	13	1	2	3	6	—	—	—	—	—
2021–22	Grand Rapids Griffins	AHL	67	5	11	16	30	—	—	—	—	—
2022–23	Grand Rapids Griffins	AHL	49	1	6	7	30	—	—	—	—	—
NHL totals			136	2	13	15	65	8	0	0	0	0

=== International ===
Year	Team	Event	Result	GP	G	A	Pts	PIM
2010	United States	WJC	1st place, gold medalist(s)	7	0	2	2	4
Junior totals				7	0	2	2	4

== Awards and honors ==
Award	Year
OHL
All-Star Game	2010
AHL
Calder Cup (Grand Rapids Griffins)	2013, 2017
