= Jared Coreau =

Canadian ice hockey player (born 1991)

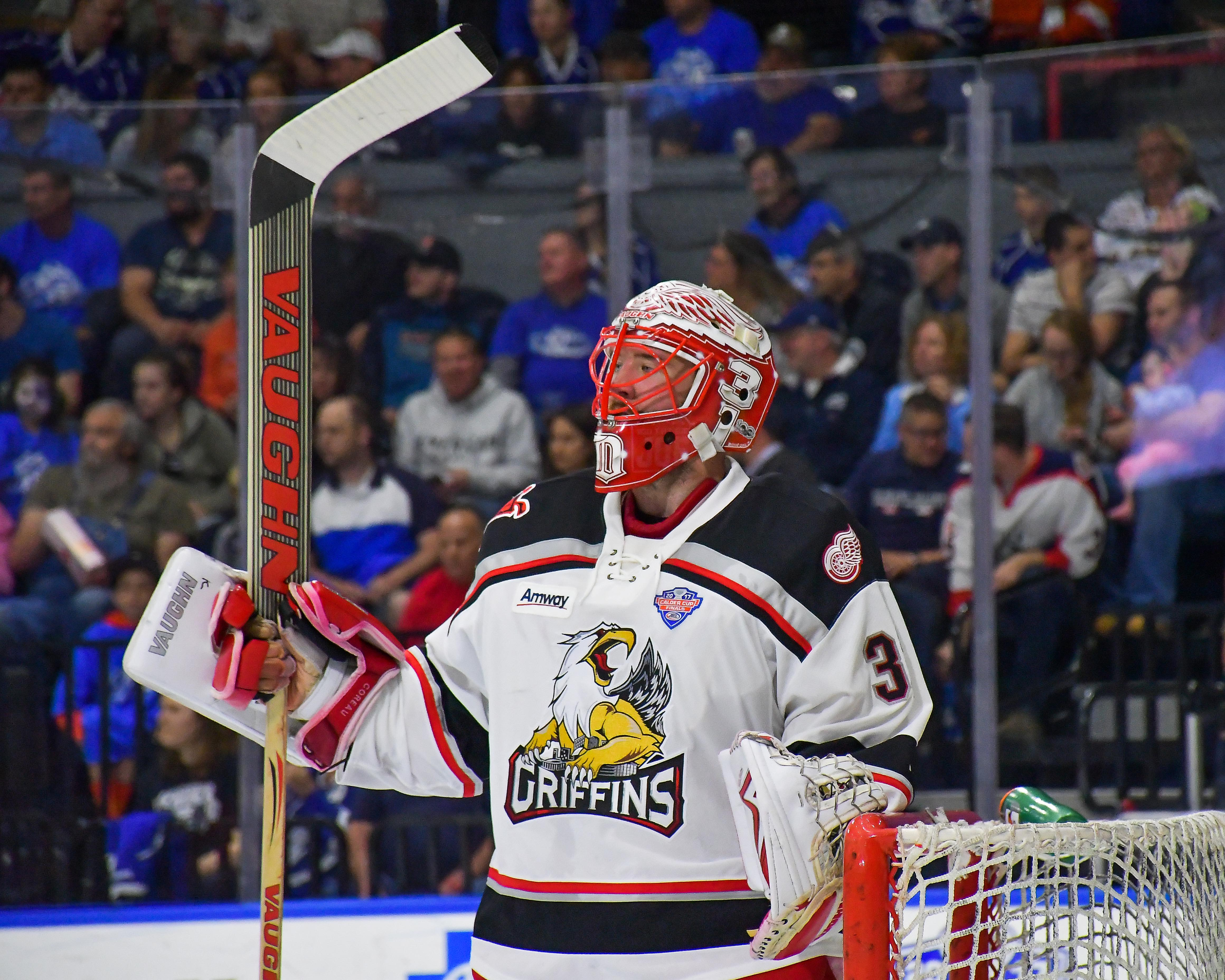
- Coreau with the Grand Rapids Griffins in 2017
- Born: November 5, 1991 (age 34) Perth, Ontario, Canada
- Height: 6 ft 6 in (198 cm)
- Weight: 220 lb (100 kg; 15 st 10 lb)
- Position: Goaltender
- Catches: Left
- team Former teams: Free Agent; Grand Rapids Griffins; Toledo Walleye; Detroit Red Wings; San Diego Gulls; San Antonio Rampage; Bridgeport Sound Tigers; Bratislava Capitals; Steinbach Black Wings Linz; Grizzlys Wolfsburg; HC Slovan Bratislava; Brynäs IF
- National team: Canada
- NHL draft: Undrafted
- Playing career: 2013–present

Jared Coreau (born November 5, 1991) is a Canadian professional ice hockey goaltender who is currently a free agent.

== Playing career ==
=== Junior ===
Coreau began his junior career playing for the Peterborough Stars of the Ontario Junior Hockey League during the 2008–09 season, where he went 8–1 with a 2.16 goals against average (GAA) and .930 save percentage. Coreau played for the Lincoln Stars of the United States Hockey League (USHL) during the 2009–10 season, where he went 7–22–0 with one shutout and had a 3.62 GAA and .882 save percentage.

=== College ===
Coreau began his collegiate career for the Northern Michigan Wildcats during the 2010–11 season. Coreau appeared in 15 games as a backup goaltender during his freshman season, where he went 5–5–2 with a 3.71 GAA and .909 save percentage. Coreau was named the CCHA Goaltender of the Week twice during the season, for the week ending November 1, 2010, and for the week ending January 4, 2011.

During the 2011–12 season, Coreau split time with Reid Ellingson in his sophomore season, where he went 12–7–2 in 23 games, with a 2.22 GAA and .928 save percentage. He posted his first career collegiate shutout on February 11, 2012, in a game against Bowling Green. Coreau was named the Gongshow Goaltender of the Month for December 2011. He appeared in four games for the Wildcats during the month of December and posted a 3–1–0 record. with a 1.35 GAA and a .956 save percentage.

During the 2012–13 season, Coreau appeared in all 38 games for Northern Michigan as a junior in what would be his final season of college hockey. He went 15–19–4 with one shutout and had a 2.70 GAA and .919 save percentage.

=== Professional ===
On April 3, 2013, Coreau was signed to a three-year, entry-level contract by the Detroit Red Wings as a free agent.

During the 2013–14 season, Coreau had a challenging first season in pro hockey, failing to earn a win in five appearances with the Red Wings' American Hockey League (AHL) affiliate Grand Rapids Griffins and winning just once with the Toledo Walleye of the ECHL. He was 0–4 with a 4.39 GAA and .873 save percentage playing for the Griffins. Coreau played in 20 games for Toledo and was 1–12–6 with a 4.03 GAA and .879 save percentage.

During the 2014–15 season, Coreau split time with Tom McCollum in Grand Rapids, where he went 13–7–1 with three shutouts and had a 2.24 GAA and .924 save percentage in his first 21 games. In eight games with Toledo, Coreau went 5–2 with a 3.01 GAA and .897 save percentage. On July 9, 2015, the Red Wings re-signed Coreau to a one-year contract extension.

During the 2015–16 season, Coreau played in a career-high 47 games during the regular season, where he went 29–15–2 with six shutouts and had a 2.43 GAA and .922 save percentage. He ranked among the AHL's top goaltenders with 29 wins (T4th), a 2.43 goals-against average (10th), 0.922 save percentage (T4th) and six shutouts (3rd). Coreau was named the CCM/AHL Goaltender of the Month for the month of December 2015. Coreau made 11 starts in December and finished with a 9–2–0 record with a 1.92 GAA and a .938 save percentage during a historic month for the Griffins. Grand Rapids extended its franchise-record winning streak to 15 games in December before a 3–2 defeat at Lake Erie on December 27 halted the run. The Griffins concluded December with a 10–2–0–0 record, marking the best December winning percentage in the franchise's history. Coreau's season ranked among the best in single-season franchise history, ranking ninth in minutes, tied for fifth in wins, first in road shutouts (four), tied for first in total shutouts, fifth in saves, first in overtime home wins (three) and tied for 10th in save percentage. He set a franchise record with a 12-game home winning streak and a 12-game home unbeaten streak, from October 21, 2015, to January 15, 2016. He tied a franchise record with a 13-game home point streak (12–0–1), set a franchise record for longest road shutout streak (206:31), and recorded three consecutive road shutouts, a franchise record.

On July 6, 2016, the Red Wings re-signed Coreau to a two-year contract extension. On November 26, 2016, Coreau was recalled by the Red Wings. Prior to being recalled, he posted an 8–5–0 record, with a 2.39 GAA, .923 save percentage and one shutout in 13 games for the Griffins. He made his NHL debut for the Red Wings on December 3, 2016, in a game against the Pittsburgh Penguins, making 32 saves in a 3–5 loss. On December 7, Coreau was assigned to the Griffins. Coreau was again recalled by the Red Wings on December 21. He recorded his first career NHL win on December 23, in a game against the Florida Panthers, making 31 saves, in a 4–3 shootout victory. On March 9, 2017, Coreau was assigned to the Griffins. Coreau appeared in 14 games with the Red Wings as a rookie, posting a 5–4–3 record, 3.46 GAA, and a 0.887 save percentage.

On January 7, 2018, Coreau was recalled by the Detroit Red Wings. Prior to being recalled, he posted a 12–9–2 record, with a 2.77 GAA, and .906 save percentage in 25 games for the Griffins. He served as the backup goaltender in the game against the Tampa Bay Lightning that night, and was assigned to the Griffins the next day. Coreau was named the CCM/AHL Player of the Week for the period ending February 18, 2018. He led the Griffins to back-to-back shutouts on the road, stopping all 66 shots he faced. On February 20, Coreau was recalled by the Red Wings, following the trade of Petr Mrazek. On April 8, 2018, Coreau was assigned to the Griffins following the conclusion of the 2017–18 NHL season. He appeared in seven games with the Red Wings this season and posted an 0–5–1 record with a 4.26 GAA and a .867 save percentage.

As a free agent from the Red Wings in the following off-season, Coreau agreed to a one-year, two-way contract with the Anaheim Ducks on July 2, 2018. After attending training camp, he was assigned to begin the 2018–19 season with AHL affiliate, the San Diego Gulls. Coreau collected just 3 wins in 13 games before he was traded by the Ducks to the St. Louis Blues for future considerations on January 3, 2019. He was immediately assigned to join the San Antonio Rampage of the AHL.

On July 10, 2019, having left the Blues as a free agent, Coreau agreed to a one-year, two-way contract with the New York Islanders. Signed to add depth to the organization, Coreau played exclusively with AHL affiliate, the Bridgeport Sound Tigers, collecting 10 wins in 28 appearances before the season was cancelled due to the COVID-19 pandemic.

On December 23, 2020, Coreau belatedly signed abroad as a free agent to a one-year contract with Slovak club Bratislava Capitals of the ICE Hockey League.

In 2021, Coreau then moved on to sign with Black Wings Linz of the ICEHL, where he went 7-23-1 with a .886 SV% with the struggling team. When his season ended, he was then brought on by Grizzlys Wolfsburg of the DEL as their 3rd string goalie, where he did not appear in a game.

In 2022, Coreau was brought on by HC Slovan Bratislava of the Slovak Extraliga as their starter. He went 21-12-0 with a .934 SV% in his first season. In 2023, he split starts with Denis Godla, going 7-13-0 with a .889 SV%. In February 2024, Coreau moved to Brynäs IF of HockeyAllsvenskan to serve as the backup for Damian Clara as they pushed for promotion to the SHL. With Coreau supporting Clara, Brynäs IF won the league and successfully achieved promotion.

== Career statistics ==
| | | | Regular season | | | | | | | | | Playoffs |
| Season | Team | League | GP | W | L | OT | MIN | GA | SO | GAA | SV% | GP | W | L | MIN | GA | SO | GAA | SV% |
|---|---|---|---|---|---|---|---|---|---|---|---|---|---|---|---|---|---|---|---|
| 2008–09 | Peterborough Stars | OJHL | 12 | 8 | 1 | 1 | 637 | 23 | 0 | 2.16 | .930 | 2 | — | — | — | — | — | 0.00 | 1.000 |
| 2009–10 | Lincoln Stars | USHL | 38 | 7 | 22 | 4 | 1,988 | 120 | 1 | 3.62 | .882 | — | — | — | — | — | — | — | — |
| 2010–11 | Northern Michigan | CCHA | 15 | 5 | 5 | 2 | 662 | 41 | 0 | 3.71 | .909 | — | — | — | — | — | — | — | — |
| 2011–12 | Northern Michigan | CCHA | 23 | 12 | 7 | 2 | 1,244 | 46 | 1 | 2.22 | .928 | — | — | — | — | — | — | — | — |
| 2012–13 | Northern Michigan | CCHA | 38 | 15 | 19 | 4 | 2,181 | 98 | 1 | 2.70 | .919 | — | — | — | — | — | — | — | — |
| 2013–14 | Grand Rapids Griffins | AHL | 5 | 0 | 4 | 0 | 205 | 15 | 0 | 4.39 | .873 | — | — | — | — | — | — | — | — |
| 2013–14 | Toledo Walleye | ECHL | 20 | 1 | 12 | 6 | 1,146 | 77 | 0 | 4.03 | .879 | — | — | — | — | — | — | — | — |
| 2014–15 | Toledo Walleye | ECHL | 8 | 5 | 2 | 0 | 439 | 22 | 0 | 3.01 | .897 | — | — | — | — | — | — | — | — |
| 2014–15 | Grand Rapids Griffins | AHL | 25 | 16 | 8 | 1 | 1,475 | 54 | 3 | 2.20 | .927 | 1 | 0 | 1 | 58 | 3 | 0 | 3.10 | .875 |
| 2015–16 | Grand Rapids Griffins | AHL | 47 | 29 | 15 | 2 | 2,742 | 111 | 6 | 2.43 | .923 | 3 | 2 | 1 | 159 | 5 | 0 | 1.89 | .949 |
| 2016–17 | Grand Rapids Griffins | AHL | 33 | 19 | 11 | 3 | 1,979 | 77 | 2 | 2.33 | .917 | 19 | 15 | 4 | 1,141 | 54 | 0 | 2.89 | .909 |
| 2016–17 | Detroit Red Wings | NHL | 14 | 5 | 4 | 3 | 712 | 41 | 2 | 3.46 | .887 | — | — | — | — | — | — | — | — |
| 2017–18 | Grand Rapids Griffins | AHL | 38 | 21 | 10 | 5 | 2,214 | 93 | 2 | 2.52 | .913 | 3 | 1 | 2 | 156 | 5 | 1 | 1.92 | .924 |
| 2017–18 | Detroit Red Wings | NHL | 7 | 0 | 5 | 1 | 381 | 27 | 0 | 4.26 | .867 | — | — | — | — | — | — | — | — |
| 2018–19 | San Diego Gulls | AHL | 13 | 3 | 6 | 3 | 672 | 40 | 0 | 3.57 | .895 | — | — | — | — | — | — | — | — |
| 2018–19 | San Antonio Rampage | AHL | 32 | 12 | 13 | 6 | 1731 | 91 | 2 | 3.15 | .886 | — | — | — | — | — | — | — | — |
| 2019–20 | Bridgeport Sound Tigers | AHL | 28 | 10 | 15 | 1 | 1544 | 81 | 0 | 3.15 | .905 | — | — | — | — | — | — | — | — |
| NHL totals | | | 21 | 5 | 9 | 4 | 1,093 | 68 | 2 | 3.74 | .880 | — | — | — | — | — | — | — | — |

== Awards and honours ==
| Award | Year |
|---|---|
AHL
| Calder Cup (Grand Rapids Griffins) | 2017 |
