= Kyle Criscuolo =

American ice hockey player (born 1992)

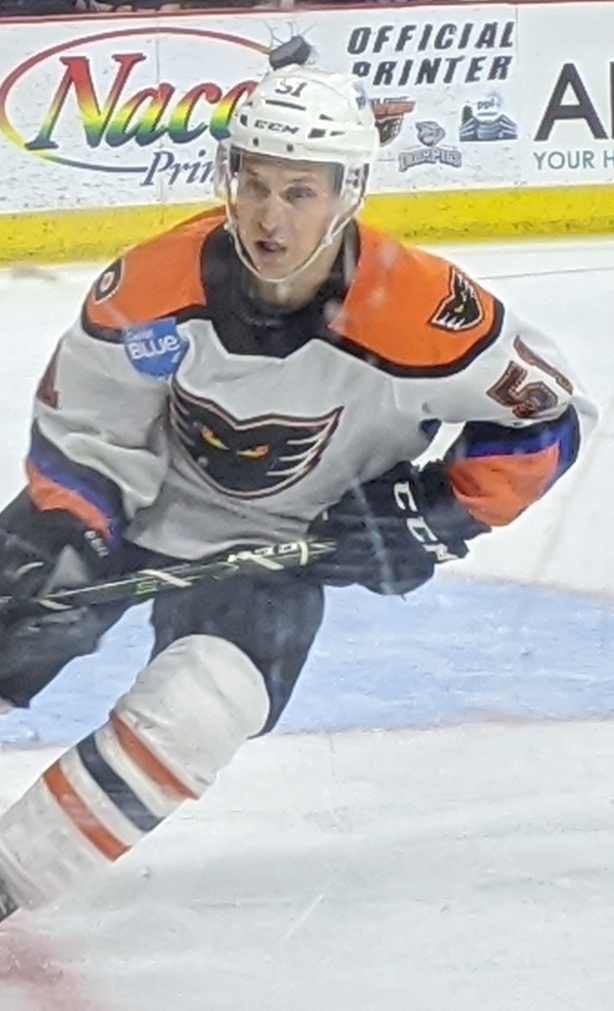
- Criscuolo with the Lehigh Valley Phantoms in 2020
- Born: May 5, 1992 (age 34) Southampton, New Jersey, U.S.
- Height: 5 ft 9 in (175 cm)
- Weight: 174 lb (79 kg; 12 st 6 lb)
- Position: Center
- Shoots: Right
- team Former teams: Free agent Buffalo Sabres; Detroit Red Wings; San Jose Sharks
- NHL draft: Undrafted
- Playing career: 2016–present

Kyle Criscuolo (born May 5, 1992) is an American professional ice hockey forward who is currently an unrestricted free agent. He most recently played for the Utica Comets of the American Hockey League (AHL).

== Playing career ==
As a youth, Criscuolo played in the 2005 Quebec International Pee-Wee Hockey Tournament with the Philadelphia Flyers minor ice hockey team.

Raised in Southampton Township, New Jersey, Criscuolo played high school hockey for two seasons at Choate Rosemary Hall in Connecticut and at St. Joseph's Preparatory School in Philadelphia for three seasons.

Criscuolo played in the United States Hockey League with the Sioux City Musketeers before committing and playing collegiate hockey with Harvard University in the ECAC. Criscuolo despite his frame, continued to develop his offensive talent, playing the final two years of his tenure with the Crimson on the top scoring line alongside, Jimmy Vesey and Alexander Kerfoot.

Undrafted, Criscuolo began his professional career at the conclusion of his senior year in the 2015–16 season. He signed a one-year American Hockey League deal for the following 2016–17 season, with the Grand Rapids Griffins on March 29, 2016, and joined the club on an amateur try-out in the closing stretches of the regular season.

In his first full professional season, Criscuolo played in all 76 regular season games with the Griffins and contributed 17 goals and 41 points. He posted 9 points in 19 post-season contests to help the Griffins claim their second Calder Cup in franchise history.

On July 1, 2017, Criscuolo as a free agent agreed to his first NHL deal, signing a two-year entry-level contract with the Buffalo Sabres. He was reassigned by the Sabres at the completion of training camp to the Rochester Americans of the AHL to begin the 2017–18 season. He added 11 points in 14 games before he was recalled from the Americans to the Sabres on November 16, 2017. He made his debut with the Sabres against the Detroit Red Wings, the NHL affiliate of the Grand Rapids Griffins, in a 3–1 defeat on November 17, 2017.

On July 1, 2019, Criscuolo left the Sabres as a free agent to sign a one-year, two-way contract with hometown team, the Philadelphia Flyers. In the following 2019–20 season, Criscuolo was assigned to AHL affiliate, the Lehigh Valley Phantoms. He collected 8 goals and 24 points in 40 games before he was dealt at the NHL trade deadline by the Flyers along with a 2020 fourth-round draft pick to the Anaheim Ducks in exchange for Derek Grant on February 24, 2020.

As a free agent from the Ducks in the off-season, Criscuolo returned for a second stint with the Detroit Red Wings' organization, agreeing to a one-year, two-way contract with the team on October 9, 2020. On January 12, 2021, the Red Wings assigned Criscuolo to the Grand Rapids Griffins. On July 28, 2021, Criscuolo agreed to a two-year, two-way contract extension to remain with the Red Wings.

During his final season under contract with the Red Wings in 2022–23, Criscuolo registered 5 goals and 10 points through 28 regular season games with the Griffins. On January 18, 2023, he was traded by the Red Wings to the San Jose Sharks in exchange for Jasper Weatherby. He was immediately reassigned to continue in the AHL with the San Jose Barracuda. Recalled to the Sharks, on April 1, 2023, Criscuolo scored his first career NHL goal in a 7–2 win over the Arizona Coyotes.

Leaving the Sharks as a free agent, Criscuolo was signed by the New Jersey Devils to a one-year, two-way contract on July 1, 2023, for the 2023–24 season.

After a lone season within the Devils organization, Criscuolo left as a free agent and was signed to a one-year AHL contract with the Charlotte Checkers, who serve as the primary affiliate to the Florida Panthers, on July 9, 2024.

== Career statistics ==
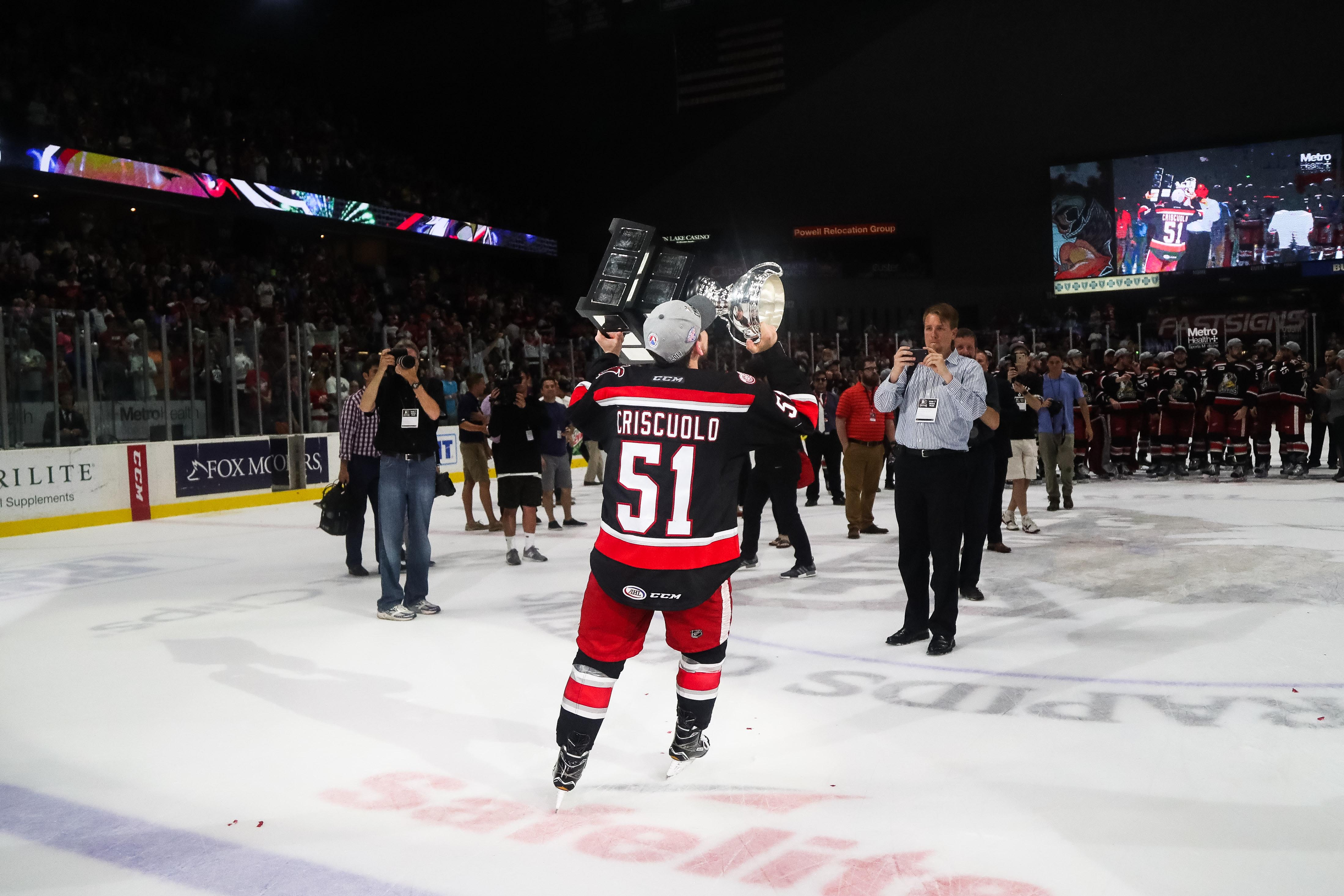
Criscuolo celebrating with the Calder Cup in 2017.

			Regular season					Playoffs
Season	Team	League	GP	G	A	Pts	PIM	GP	G	A	Pts	PIM
2008–09	Saint Joseph Prep	USHS	21	25	32	57	18	—	—	—	—	—
2009–10	Choate Rosemary Hall	USHS	28	19	22	41	12	—	—	—	—	—
2009–10	New York Bobcats	AtJHL	9	4	3	7	4	2	0	1	1	0
2010–11	Choate Rosemary Hall	USHS	24	15	27	42	22	—	—	—	—	—
2011–12	Sioux City Musketeers	USHL	59	21	23	44	24	1	0	1	1	0
2012–13	Harvard University	ECAC	22	6	7	13	4	—	—	—	—	—
2013–14	Harvard University	ECAC	31	11	9	20	22	—	—	—	—	—
2014–15	Harvard University	ECAC	37	17	31	48	12	—	—	—	—	—
2015–16	Harvard University	ECAC	34	19	13	32	8	—	—	—	—	—
2015–16	Grand Rapids Griffins	AHL	4	0	0	0	0	—	—	—	—	—
2016–17	Grand Rapids Griffins	AHL	76	17	24	41	14	19	5	4	9	14
2017–18	Rochester Americans	AHL	51	15	19	34	34	3	1	0	1	2
2017–18	Buffalo Sabres	NHL	9	0	0	0	4	—	—	—	—	—
2018–19	Rochester Americans	AHL	43	6	14	20	14	3	0	0	0	0
2019–20	Lehigh Valley Phantoms	AHL	40	8	16	24	14	—	—	—	—	—
2019–20	San Diego Gulls	AHL	7	0	0	0	0	—	—	—	—	—
2020–21	Grand Rapids Griffins	AHL	29	11	8	19	16	—	—	—	—	—
2021–22	Grand Rapids Griffins	AHL	57	15	24	39	18	—	—	—	—	—
2021–22	Detroit Red Wings	NHL	6	0	2	2	2	—	—	—	—	—
2022–23	Grand Rapids Griffins	AHL	28	5	5	10	17	—	—	—	—	—
2022–23	San Jose Barracuda	AHL	32	12	7	19	16	—	—	—	—	—
2022–23	San Jose Sharks	NHL	1	1	0	1	0	—	—	—	—	—
2023–24	Utica Comets	AHL	63	16	26	42	23	—	—	—	—	—
2024–25	Charlotte Checkers	AHL	70	19	16	35	29	15	2	6	8	24
2025–26	Utica Comets	AHL	62	14	21	35	22	—	—	—	—	—
NHL totals			16	1	2	3	6	—	—	—	—	—

== Awards and honors ==
Award	Year
College
All-ECAC Hockey Second Team	2015, 2016
ECAC Student-Athlete of the Year	2015, 2016
All-Ivy League Second Team	2015, 2016
AHL
Calder Cup champion	2017
