= Buddy Robinson =

American ice hockey player (born 1991)

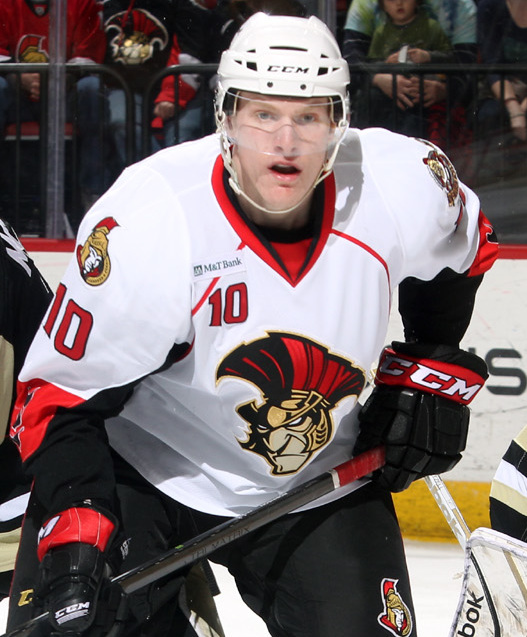
- Robinson with the Binghamton Senators in 2014
- Born: September 30, 1991 (age 34) Bellmawr, New Jersey, U.S.
- Height: 6 ft 6 in (198 cm)
- Weight: 230 lb (104 kg; 16 st 6 lb)
- Position: Right wing
- Shot: Right
- Played for: Ottawa Senators; Calgary Flames; Anaheim Ducks; Chicago Blackhawks; Traktor Chelyabinsk
- NHL draft: Undrafted
- Playing career: 2013–2025

Charles James "Buddy" Robinson III (born September 30, 1991) is an American former professional ice hockey player. He played for the Ottawa Senators, Calgary Flames, Anaheim Ducks, and Chicago Blackhawks of the National Hockey League (NHL). He most recently played for Traktor Chelyabinsk of the Kontinental Hockey League (KHL).

== Playing career ==
Raised in Bellmawr, New Jersey, Robinson attended Gloucester Catholic High School. Robinson played two seasons of collegiate hockey with Lake Superior State University of the Central Collegiate Hockey Association.

Undrafted, he was signed by the Ottawa Senators of the NHL to a three-year entry-level contract on March 25, 2013.

While playing mostly in the AHL with the Senators affiliate, the Binghamton Senators, Robinson did play three games with the NHL Ottawa Senators in April 2016 and scored his first NHL goal in a 3–1 win over the Florida Panthers. He added an assist a game later and finished with 1 goal, 1 assist, +2 in those three games.

On June 23, 2016, the Senators re-signed Robinson to a one-year, two-way deal. In the following 2016–17 season, Robinson was assigned and returned to the Binghamton Senators to start the year. He appeared in a further 4 scoreless games with Ottawa, before he was traded to the San Jose Sharks, along with Zack Stortini and a 7th round draft pick in the 2017 draft, in exchange for Tommy Wingels on January 24, 2016. He was immediately assigned to the Sharks AHL affiliate, the San Jose Barracuda.

On July 1, 2017, Robinson signed a one-year, two-way deal with the Winnipeg Jets. In the 2017–18 season, Robinson played 74 games with the Jets' AHL affiliate, the Manitoba Moose, finishing third in scoring with 25 goals and 28 assists for 53 points.

Having concluded his contract with the Jets, Robinson left as a free agent to sign a two-year, two-way contract with the Calgary Flames on July 2, 2018.

Robinson returned to the NHL with the Flames on January 28, 2020, in Calgary against the St. Louis Blues.

On October 9, 2020, Robinson signed a one-year contract extension with the Flames. In the pandemic delayed 2020–21 season, Robinson remained with the Flames for the duration of the season, largely assigned to the club's extended Taxi Squad. He featured in 9 regular season games, going scoreless.

On July 29, 2021, Robinson signed to a one-year, two-way contract with the Anaheim Ducks as a free agent. After beginning the 2021–22 season in the AHL with affiliate, San Diego Gulls, Robinson was recalled by the Ducks and appeared in a career best 32 regular season games, collecting 1 goal and 5 assists for 6 points.

As a free agent from his lone season with the Ducks, Robinson was signed to a one-year, two-way contract with the Chicago Blackhawks on July 25, 2022. Robinson added a goal and 2 assists in 9 NHL contests for the Blackhawks in the 2022–23 season and scored what proved to be the game winner that eliminated the Pittsburgh Penguins from playoff contention in April 2023.

At the conclusion of his contract with the Blackhawks, Robinson remained un-signed over the summer. On September 21, 2023, he opted to leave North America and move abroad by agreeing to a one-year contract for the remainder of the 2023–24 season with Russian club, Traktor Chelyabinsk of the KHL.

== Personal ==
His brother Eric currently plays for the Carolina Hurricanes of the NHL.

== Career statistics ==
			Regular season					Playoffs
Season	Team	League	GP	G	A	Pts	PIM	GP	G	A	Pts	PIM
2009–10	Hamilton Red Wings	OJHL	49	11	12	23	62	—	—	—	—	—
2010–11	Hamilton Red Wings	OJHL	32	15	23	38	39	—	—	—	—	—
2010–11	Nepean Raiders	CCHL	19	5	19	24	20	—	—	—	—	—
2011–12	Lake Superior State University	CCHA	39	5	5	10	37	—	—	—	—	—
2012–13	Lake Superior State University	CCHA	38	8	8	16	48	—	—	—	—	—
2012–13	Binghamton Senators	AHL	6	2	2	4	8	2	0	0	0	0
2013–14	Binghamton Senators	AHL	69	15	16	31	49	4	0	0	0	4
2013–14	Elmira Jackals	ECHL	1	0	0	0	0	—	—	—	—	—
2014–15	Binghamton Senators	AHL	75	12	22	34	69	—	—	—	—	—
2015–16	Binghamton Senators	AHL	62	13	10	23	66	—	—	—	—	—
2015–16	Ottawa Senators	NHL	3	1	1	2	4	—	—	—	—	—
2016–17	Binghamton Senators	AHL	33	7	5	12	18	—	—	—	—	—
2016–17	Ottawa Senators	NHL	4	0	0	0	2	—	—	—	—	—
2016–17	San Jose Barracuda	AHL	33	10	9	19	53	15	4	5	9	12
2017–18	Manitoba Moose	AHL	74	25	28	53	64	7	1	3	4	19
2018–19	Stockton Heat	AHL	65	14	28	42	51	—	—	—	—	—
2019–20	Stockton Heat	AHL	45	18	14	32	60	—	—	—	—	—
2019–20	Calgary Flames	NHL	5	1	0	1	7	1	0	0	0	0
2020–21	Calgary Flames	NHL	9	0	0	0	0	—	—	—	—	—
2021–22	San Diego Gulls	AHL	28	4	5	9	23	—	—	—	—	—
2021–22	Anaheim Ducks	NHL	32	1	5	6	19	—	—	—	—	—
2022–23	Chicago Blackhawks	NHL	9	1	2	3	4	—	—	—	—	—
2022–23	Rockford IceHogs	AHL	52	9	11	20	61	5	1	1	2	4
2023–24	Traktor Chelyabinsk	KHL	53	10	5	15	33	13	5	2	7	63
2024–25	Traktor Chelyabinsk	KHL	61	12	12	24	32	20	5	3	8	14
NHL totals			62	4	8	12	36	1	0	0	0	0
KHL totals			114	22	17	39	65	33	10	5	15	77
