= Ben Thomas (ice hockey) =

Canadian ice hockey player

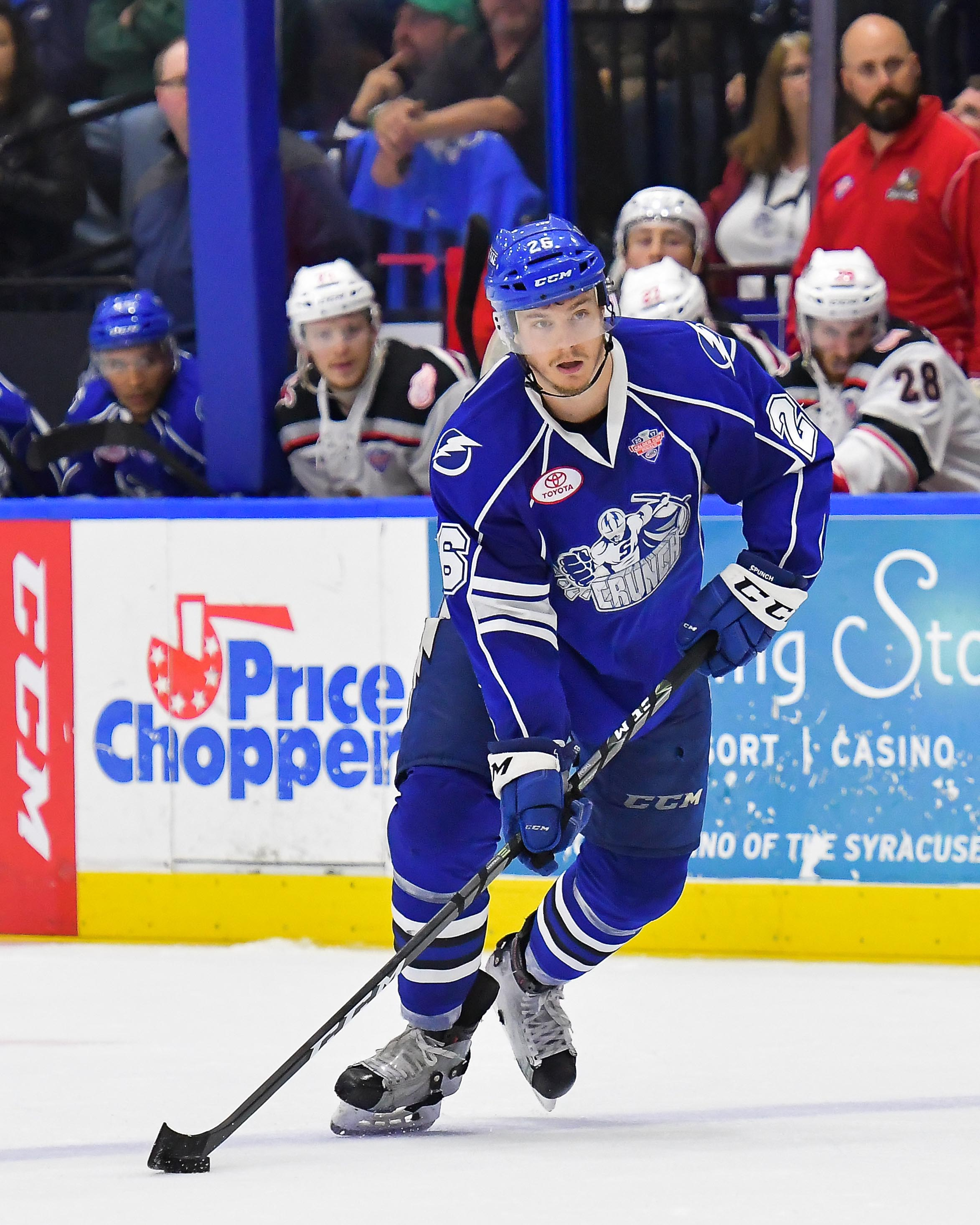
- Thomas with the Syracuse Crunch in 2017
- Born: May 28, 1996 (age 30) Calgary, Alberta, Canada
- Height: 6 ft 1 in (185 cm)
- Weight: 187 lb (85 kg; 13 st 5 lb)
- Position: Defence
- Shoots: Right
- team Former teams: Free agent Tampa Bay Lightning; Leksands IF; Växjö Lakers; Tappara; Iserlohn Roosters; HK Poprad
- NHL draft: 119th overall, 2014; Tampa Bay Lightning
- Playing career: 2016–present

Ben Thomas (born May 28, 1996) is a Canadian professional ice hockey defenceman. He is currently an unrestricted free agent who most recently played with HK Poprad in the Slovak Extraliga (Slovak).

== Playing career ==
Thomas was selected by the Tampa Bay Lightning, 119th overall, in the 2014 NHL Entry Draft, while playing major junior hockey with the Calgary Hitmen of the Western Hockey League (WHL).

Following the conclusion of his final junior season, finishing second amongst defenseman in scoring on the Vancouver Giants, Thomas was signed to a three-year, entry-level contract with the Tampa Bay Lightning on March 23, 2016. Thomas immediately joined AHL affiliate, the Syracuse Crunch, and made his professional debut to end the 2015–16 season, recording 4 points in 8 regular season games.

After the expiration of his entry-level contract, he re-signed with Tampa Bay on a one-year, two-way contract on October 12, 2020.

On April 4, 2021, Thomas skated in his first career NHL game against the Detroit Red Wings at Amalie Arena.

As a free agent from the Lightning after six seasons within the organization, Thomas opted to pursue a career abroad, agreeing to a one-year contract with Swedish top flight club, Leksands IF of the SHL, on August 25, 2021. In the 2021–22 season, Thomas made 32 appearances with Leksands however was unable to make an impact in recording just 3 points. On February 10, 2022, he transferred mid-season to fellow SHL club, Växjö Lakers, for the remainder of the campaign.

Continuing his European career, Thomas signed as a free agent to a one-year contract with Finnish club, Tappara of the Liiga, on August 18, 2022. In the following 2022–23 season, Thomas was a fixture on the blueline with Tappara, appearing in 50 regular season games and contributing with 4 goals and 12 points. He added 5 points through 14 playoff games, helping Tappara claim their second consecutive Liiga title.

Leaving Tappara at the conclusion of his contract, Thomas agreed to a one-year contract with German club, Iserlohn Roosters of the DEL, on June 23, 2023.

== Career statistics ==
=== Regular season and playoffs ===
			Regular season					Playoffs
Season	Team	League	GP	G	A	Pts	PIM	GP	G	A	Pts	PIM
2012–13	Calgary Mustangs	AJHL	12	1	0	1	4	—	—	—	—	—
2012–13	Calgary Canucks	AJHL	32	4	3	7	33	—	—	—	—	—
2012–13	Calgary Hitmen	WHL	—	—	—	—	—	1	0	0	0	0
2013–14	Calgary Hitmen	WHL	72	7	24	31	39	6	1	5	6	13
2014–15	Calgary Hitmen	WHL	60	7	24	31	28	17	0	4	4	2
2015–16	Calgary Hitmen	WHL	14	0	3	3	10	—	—	—	—	—
2015–16	Vancouver Giants	WHL	60	8	17	25	40	—	—	—	—	—
2015–16	Syracuse Crunch	AHL	8	1	3	4	0	—	—	—	—	—
2016–17	Syracuse Crunch	AHL	71	3	18	21	30	22	5	8	13	12
2017–18	Syracuse Crunch	AHL	72	4	18	22	58	3	0	0	0	2
2018–19	Syracuse Crunch	AHL	67	2	14	16	24	4	0	0	0	2
2019–20	Syracuse Crunch	AHL	56	3	13	16	22	—	—	—	—	—
2020–21	Syracuse Crunch	AHL	16	1	8	9	10	—	—	—	—	—
2020–21	Tampa Bay Lightning	NHL	5	0	0	0	0	—	—	—	—	—
2021–22	Leksands IF	SHL	32	2	1	3	16	—	—	—	—	—
2021–22	Växjö Lakers	SHL	15	2	1	3	6	2	0	0	0	2
2022–23	Tappara	Liiga	50	4	8	12	53	14	1	4	5	31
2023–24	Iserlohn Roosters	DEL	45	2	11	13	27	—	—	—	—	—
NHL totals			5	0	0	0	0	—	—	—	—	—
SHL totals			47	4	2	6	22	2	0	0	0	2

=== International ===
Year	Team	Event	Result	GP	G	A	Pts	PIM
2014	Canada	U18	3rd place, bronze medalist(s)	7	0	1	1	2
Junior totals				7	0	1	1	2
