= Byron Froese =

Canadian ice hockey player (born 1991)

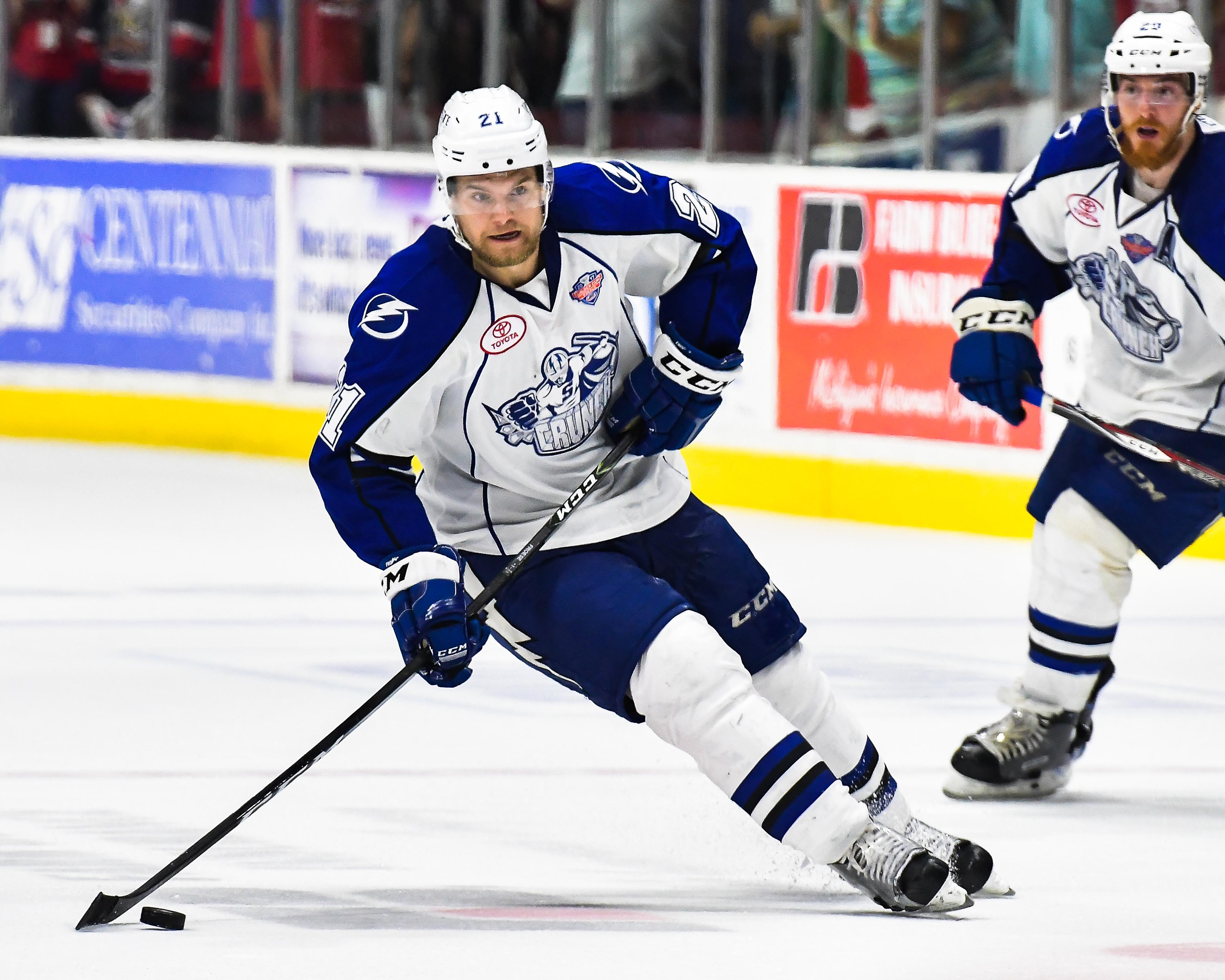
- Froese with the Syracuse Crunch in 2017
- Born: March 12, 1991 (age 35) Winkler, Manitoba, Canada
- Height: 6 ft 0 in (183 cm)
- Weight: 205 lb (93 kg; 14 st 9 lb)
- Position: Centre
- Shot: Right
- Played for: Toronto Maple Leafs; Tampa Bay Lightning; Montreal Canadiens; Calgary Flames; Vegas Golden Knights; Lokomotiv Yaroslavl
- NHL draft: 119th overall, 2009; Chicago Blackhawks
- Playing career: 2011–2026

Byron Froese (born March 12, 1991) is a Canadian former professional ice hockey player. Froese was selected in the fourth round, 119th overall, by Chicago Blackhawks in the 2009 NHL entry draft. Froese has previously played for Toronto Maple Leafs, Tampa Bay Lightning, Montreal Canadiens, Calgary Flames and Vegas Golden Knights of the National Hockey League (NHL).

== Playing career ==
On May 31, 2011, the Chicago Blackhawks of the NHL signed Froese to a three-year entry-level contract. He split the majority of his contract between affiliates, the Rockford IceHogs of the American Hockey League and the Toledo Walleye of the ECHL.

In the final year of his entry-level deal with the Blackhawks in the 2013–14 season, he was reassigned from the IceHogs to Cincinnati Cyclones, where he largely contributed to their Kelly Cup final appearance with 25 points in 23 games. As a free agent from the Blackhawks, Froese opted to remain with the Cyclones, signing a one-year deal on August 14, 2014.

The Cyclones loaned Froese to the San Antonio Rampage to begin the 2014–15 season. After he was returned to Cincinnati, he was later loaned to the Toronto Marlies. In a successful stint with the Marlies, Froese was signed for the remainder of the season by the Marlies on January 7, 2015.

On July 3, 2015, Froese was signed by the Marlies parent affiliate, Toronto Maple Leafs, to a two-year contract. Early into the 2015–16 season, Froese received his first recall from the Marlies to the NHL on October 23, 2015. On the following day, Froese made his NHL debut with the Maple Leafs in a 5-3 defeat to the Montreal Canadiens. On December 19, 2015, Froese scored his first NHL goal against the Kings. Froese would finish the season with just 5 points in 56 games, but he earned high praise from both coach Mike Babcock and the media for his great defensive play.

In the 2016–17 season, on February 27, 2017, Froese was traded by the Maple Leafs to the Tampa Bay Lightning along with a conditional second round draft choice in 2017 in exchange for centre Brian Boyle.

On July 1, 2017, having left the Lightning as a free agent, Froese agreed to a two-year contract with Montreal Canadiens, with the final season of his deal played on a one-way basis. In the 2017–18 season, Froese was initially assigned to inaugural AHL affiliate, the Laval Rocket. As captain of the Rocket, he appeared in just 13 games with the club before he was recalled to the Canadiens on November 8, 2017. On December 22, 2017, Froese scored his first goal with the Canadiens against the Calgary Flames. Froese played out the remainder of the season with the Canadiens, notching career NHL highs with 3 goals and 11 points in 46 games.

In the following 2018–19 season, Froese was re-assigned to the Rocket and selected as captain. He scored 30 points through 46 games for the Rocket before he was traded by the Canadiens, alongside David Schlemko, to the Philadelphia Flyers in exchange for Dale Weise and Christian Folin on February 9, 2019.

On July 1, 2019, Froese signed as a free agent to a one-year, two-way contract with the Calgary Flames.

On July 13, 2022, Froese signed as a free agent to a two-year, two-way contract with the Vegas Golden Knights.

At the end his contracted tenure with the Golden Knights, Froese left as a free agent and signed his first contract abroad by agreeing to a one-year contract with Russian club, Lokomotiv Yaroslavl of the KHL, on July 15, 2024. On May 21, 2025, Lokomotiv, with Froese in the lineup, defeated Traktor Chelyabinsk four games to one in the championship series and became the Gagarin Cup winner - for the first time in the club's history. A year later on the same day, Froese helped Lokomotiv win its second title in a row - this time they beat Ak Bars Kazan 4-2 in the Cup finals.

== Career statistics ==
=== Regular season and playoffs ===
			Regular season					Playoffs
Season	Team	League	GP	G	A	Pts	PIM	GP	G	A	Pts	PIM
2008–09	Everett Silvertips	WHL	72	19	38	57	30	5	0	3	3	4
2009–10	Everett Silvertips	WHL	70	29	32	61	37	7	3	2	5	0
2010–11	Red Deer Rebels	WHL	70	43	38	81	37	9	5	2	7	4
2011–12	Rockford IceHogs	AHL	57	4	6	10	17	—	—	—	—	—
2011–12	Toledo Walleye	ECHL	3	1	1	2	2	—	—	—	—	—
2012–13	Toledo Walleye	ECHL	38	12	21	33	12	6	2	4	6	6
2012–13	Rockford IceHogs	AHL	9	0	2	2	4	—	—	—	—	—
2013–14	Rockford IceHogs	AHL	28	0	5	5	14	—	—	—	—	—
2013–14	Cincinnati Cyclones	ECHL	25	11	10	21	20	23	8	17	25	20
2014–15	San Antonio Rampage	AHL	3	0	0	0	2	—	—	—	—	—
2014–15	Cincinnati Cyclones	ECHL	17	8	16	24	14	—	—	—	—	—
2014–15	Toronto Marlies	AHL	46	18	24	42	26	5	1	3	4	4
2015–16	Toronto Marlies	AHL	4	3	0	3	0	—	—	—	—	—
2015–16	Toronto Maple Leafs	NHL	56	2	3	5	16	—	—	—	—	—
2016–17	Toronto Marlies	AHL	48	24	15	39	18	—	—	—	—	—
2016–17	Toronto Maple Leafs	NHL	2	0	0	0	5	—	—	—	—	—
2016–17	Syracuse Crunch	AHL	6	3	4	7	4	22	6	7	13	8
2016–17	Tampa Bay Lightning	NHL	4	0	0	0	0	—	—	—	—	—
2017–18	Laval Rocket	AHL	13	3	8	11	6	—	—	—	—	—
2017–18	Montreal Canadiens	NHL	48	3	8	11	26	—	—	—	—	—
2018–19	Laval Rocket	AHL	46	14	16	30	23	—	—	—	—	—
2018–19	Lehigh Valley Phantoms	AHL	24	7	7	14	28	—	—	—	—	—
2019–20	Stockton Heat	AHL	46	19	23	42	44	—	—	—	—	—
2020–21	Calgary Flames	NHL	6	1	0	1	2	—	—	—	—	—
2020–21	Stockton Heat	AHL	15	4	1	5	8	—	—	—	—	—
2021–22	Stockton Heat	AHL	55	20	17	37	46	13	1	9	10	10
2022–23	Henderson Silver Knights	AHL	60	10	24	34	42	—	—	—	—	—
2022–23	Vegas Golden Knights	NHL	9	1	1	2	4	—	—	—	—	—
2023–24	Henderson Silver Knights	AHL	53	13	18	31	28	—	—	—	—	—
2023–24	Vegas Golden Knights	NHL	16	0	1	1	4	—	—	—	—	—
2024–25	Lokomotiv Yaroslavl	KHL	61	17	16	33	22	19	4	4	8	11
2025–26	Lokomotiv Yaroslavl	KHL	66	13	12	25	39	18	5	4	9	22
NHL totals			141	7	13	20	57	—	—	—	—	—
KHL totals			127	30	28	58	61	37	9	8	17	33

=== International ===
Year	Team	Event	Result	GP	G	A	Pts	PIM
2009	Canada	U18	4th	6	4	3	7	4
Junior totals				6	4	3	7	4

== Awards and honours ==
Award	Year
KHL
Gagarin Cup champion	2025, 2026
