= Stockton Heat =

American Hockey League team in Stockton, California

- City: Stockton, California
- League: American Hockey League
- Conference: Western
- Division: Pacific
- Founded: 1977
- Operated: 2015–2022
- Home arena: Stockton Arena
- Colors: Black, red, gold, white
- Owners: Calgary Sports and Entertainment (N. Murray Edwards, chairman)
- Affiliates: Calgary Flames (NHL); Kansas City Mavericks (ECHL)

Franchise history
- 1977–1987: Maine Mariners
- 1987–1993: Utica Devils
- 1993–2003: Saint John Flames
- 2005–2007: Omaha Ak-Sar-Ben Knights
- 2007–2009: Quad City Flames
- 2009–2014: Abbotsford Heat
- 2014–2015: Adirondack Flames
- 2015–2022: Stockton Heat
- 2022–present: Calgary Wranglers

Championships
- Division titles: 1 (2021–22)

The Stockton Heat were a professional ice hockey team in the American Hockey League (AHL) that played from 2015 to 2022. The team was based in Stockton, California, and was affiliated with the National Hockey League (NHL) Calgary Flames. The Heat played its home games at Stockton Arena. It was a relocation of the Adirondack Flames, joining four other relocated AHL franchises in California that formed the basis for a Pacific Division following the 2014–15 season.

The Heat replaced the ECHL's Stockton Thunder, which played from 2005 until 2015, after which they moved to Glens Falls, New York, where the franchise became the Adirondack Thunder. After the 2021–22 season, the Heat would be relocated to Calgary, Alberta, and would become the Calgary Wranglers. The team had played the entire 2020–21 season in Calgary due to the COVID-19 pandemic restricting cross-border travel.

== History ==
On January 29, 2015, the Calgary Flames announced that they would be moving their AHL affiliate, the Adirondack Flames, to Stockton as one of five charter members of the AHL's new Pacific Division. The team held a name-the-team contest and announced the five finalists as the Blaze, Fire, Heat, Inferno and Scorch on February 24, 2015. The winning name was announced by the Calgary Flames on March 11.

In support of the new division's first season, the AHL played an outdoor game hosted by the Heat. The game, called the Golden State Hockey Rush, was the first AHL outdoor game to be held in California at Raley Field in West Sacramento on December 18, 2015. The Heat defeated the Bakersfield Condors 3–2 in front of 9,357 fans.

The 2019–20 AHL season was curtailed by the COVID-19 pandemic while Stockton was in third place in the Pacific Division and no playoffs were held. The Heat's initial five-year lease with the city to use Stockton Arena expired, but a one-season extension was signed in February 2020. The start of the 2020–21 AHL season was then postponed and eventually led to the creation of temporary Canadian Division due to border crossing restrictions amidst the ongoing pandemic. Due to the Heat being separated from its parent team by the border, the team was relocated for the shortened season to Calgary and shared the Flames' home arena, Scotiabank Saddledome and played only against other Canadian-based AHL teams.

On May 23, 2022, the Calgary Flames announced the relocation of the Heat, to Calgary, starting in the 2022–23 season. On June 14, 2022, the Heat played their final game, losing to the Chicago Wolves in game six of the Western Conference Finals of the 2022 Calder Cup playoffs.

== Season-by-season results ==
Regular season											Playoffs					
Season	GP	W	L	OTL	SOL	Pts	PCT	GF	GA	Standing	Year	Prelims	1st round	2nd round	3rd round	Finals
2015–16	68	32	32	2	2	68	.500	194	224	6th, Pacific	2016	Did not qualify				
2016–17	68	34	25	7	2	77	.566	212	192	4th, Pacific	2017	—	L, 2–3, SJ	—	—	—
2017–18	68	34	28	2	4	74	.544	211	204	6th, Pacific	2018	Did not qualify				
2018–19	68	31	31	4	2	68	.500	235	252	6th, Pacific	2019	Did not qualify				
2019–20	55	30	17	4	4	68	.618	194	170	3rd, Pacific	2020	Season cancelled due to the COVID-19 pandemic				
2020–21	30	11	17	2	0	24	.400	79	95	5th, Canadian	2021	No playoffs were held				
2021–22	68	45	16	5	2	97	.713	242	185	1st, Pacific	2022	—	W, 3–0, BAK	W, 3–1, COL	L, 2–4, CHI	—

== Players ==
=== Team captains ===
- Aaron Johnson, 2015–16
- Mike Angelidis, 2016–17
- Rod Pelley, 2017–18
- Byron Froese, 2019–2022

== Team records and leaders ==
=== Scoring leaders ===
These are the top-ten point-scorers for the Stockton Heat during their tenure in the AHL.

Note: Pos = Position; GP = Games played; G = Goals; A = Assists; Pts = Points; P/G = Points per game;

Points
Player	Pos	GP	G	A	Pts	P/G
Matthew Phillips	RW	199	67	94	161	.81
Glenn Gawdin	C	201	46	102	148	.74
Ryan Lomberg	LW	219	49	60	109	.50
Andrew Mangiapane	LW	120	50	54	104	.87
Morgan Klimchuk	LW	200	44	56	100	.50
Alan Quine	C	79	33	65	98	1.24
Luke Philp	C	148	48	44	92	.62
Oliver Kylington	D	190	28	63	91	.48
Byron Froese	C	116	43	41	84	.72
Justin Kirkland	LW	135	33	50	83	.61
