= 2016 Calder Cup playoffs =

2016 AHL Calder Cup playoffs results

Tournament details
- Dates: April 20 – June 11, 2016
- Teams: 16

Final positions
- Champions: Lake Erie Monsters
- Runners-up: Hershey Bears

Tournament statistics
- Scoring leader(s): Connor Carrick (Marlies) (18 points)

Awards
- MVP: Oliver Bjorkstrand (Monsters)

The 2016 Calder Cup playoffs were held from April 20 to June 11, 2016, to determine the season champion of the American Hockey League (AHL). The 16 teams that qualified, eight from each conference, played best-of-five series in the division semifinals, then best-of-seven series for the division finals, conference finals, and Calder Cup finals. In the finals, the Lake Erie Monsters defeated the Hershey Bears in a four-game sweep to win the Calder Cup for the first time in franchise history. It was the 10th time the Calder Cup was won by a team representing Cleveland, as the Cleveland Barons won nine titles during their history (1937–1973).

== Playoff seeds ==
After the 2015–16 AHL regular season, 16 teams qualified for the playoffs. The top four teams in each division ranked by points percentage (points earned divided by points available) qualify for the 2016 Calder Cup Playoffs, with one exception in each conference: if the fifth-place team in the Atlantic or Central Division finishes with a better points percentage than the fourth-place team in the North or Pacific Division, it would cross over and compete in the other division's bracket.

At the end of the regular season, the following teams qualified (with points percentage):

=== Eastern Conference ===
==== Atlantic Division ====
1. Hershey Bears – 98 points (.645)
2. Providence Bruins – 95 points (.625)
3. Wilkes-Barre/Scranton Penguins – 92 points (.605)
4. Portland Pirates – 90 points (.592)
5. Bridgeport Sound Tigers – 87 points (.572)

==== North Division ====
1. Toronto Marlies – 114 points (.750)
2. Albany Devils – 102 points (.671)
3. Utica Comets – 88 points (.579)

=== Western Conference ===
==== Central Division ====
1. Milwaukee Admirals – 101 points (.664)
2. Lake Erie Monsters – 97 points (.638)
3. Rockford IceHogs – 94 points (.618)
4. Grand Rapids Griffins – 90 points (.592)

==== Pacific Division ====
1. Ontario Reign – 93 points (.684)
2. San Diego Gulls – 84 points (.618)
3. Texas Stars – 91 points (.599)
4. San Jose Barracuda – 73 points (.537)

== Bracket ==
Division semifinals	Division finals
A1	Hershey	3
A4	Portland	2
A1	Hershey	4
A3	W-B/Scranton	3
A2	Providence	0
A3	W-B/Scranton	3
Eastern Conference
N1	Toronto	3
A5	Bridgeport	0
N1	Toronto	4
N2	Albany	3
N2	Albany	3
N3	Utica	1
C1	Milwaukee	0
C4	Grand Rapids	3
C4	Grand Rapids	2
C2	Lake Erie	4
C2	Lake Erie	3
C3	Rockford	0
Western Conference
P1	Ontario	3
P4	San Jose	1
P1	Ontario	4
P2	San Diego	1
P2	San Diego	3
P3	Texas	1

Conference finals
A1	Hershey	4
N1	Toronto	1
C2	Lake Erie	4
P1	Ontario	0

Calder Cup final
A1	Hershey	0
C2	Lake Erie	4

== Division semifinals ==
Note 1: All times are in Eastern Time (UTC−04:00).
Note 2: Game times in italics signify games to be played only if necessary.
Note 3: Home team is listed first.

=== Eastern Conference ===
==== (A1) Hershey Bears vs. (A4) Portland Pirates ====
April 22	Portland Pirates	6 – 4	Hershey Bears	Cross Insurance Arena	Recap
Kyle Rau (1) – 6:11; Rob Schremp (1) – 18:04		First period	19:46 – Ryan Stanton (1)
Brett Olson (1) – 14:08		Second period	15:49 – Jakub Vrana (1)
Shane Harper (1) – 3:12; Rob Schremp (2) – 3:23; Shane Harper (2) – pp – 19:50		Third period	7:49 – Tyler Lewington (1); 15:14 – Tyler Lewington (2)
Mike McKenna 28 saves / 32 shots		Goalie stats	Dan Ellis 26 saves / 32 shots

April 23	Portland Pirates	1 – 3	Hershey Bears	Cross Insurance Arena	Recap
No scoring		First period	No scoring
Sena Acolatse (1) – 18:02		Second period	1:41 – Garrett Mitchell (1)
No scoring		Third period	1:31 – pp – Riley Barber (1); 8:07 – Jakub Vrana (2)
Mike McKenna 18 saves / 21 shots		Goalie stats	Justin Peters 31 saves / 32 shots

April 28	Hershey Bears	1 – 2	3OT	Portland Pirates	Giant Center	Recap
No scoring		First period		No scoring
Nathan Walker (1) – 5:27		Second period		No scoring
No scoring		Third period		6:28 – Greg McKegg (1)
No scoring		Third overtime period		3:10 – Rob Flick (1)
Justin Peters 42 saves / 44 shots		Goalie stats		Mike McKenna 41 saves / 42 shots

April 30	Hershey Bears	2 – 0	Portland Pirates	Giant Center	Recap
Travis Boyd (1) – 12:51; Chris Bourque (1) – pp – 16:23		First period	No scoring
No scoring		Second period	No scoring
No scoring		Third period	No scoring
Justin Peters 19 saves / 19 shots		Goalie stats	Mike McKenna 26 saves / 28 shots

May 1	Hershey Bears	2 – 1	Portland Pirates	Giant Center	Recap
Sean Collins (1) – 14:19		First period	No scoring
Ryan Stanton (2) – 8:29		Second period	No scoring
No scoring		Third period	2:51 – Wayne Simpson (1)
Justin Peters 23 saves / 24 shots		Goalie stats	Mike McKenna 21 saves / 23 shots

Hershey wins series 3–2

==== (A2) Providence Bruins vs. (A3) Wilkes-Barre/Scranton Penguins ====
April 20	Wilkes-Barre/Scranton Penguins	3 – 2	OT	Providence Bruins	Mohegan Sun Arena at Casey Plaza	Recap
Jake Guentzel (1) – 13:13		First period		No scoring
Dustin Jeffrey (1) – 0:18		Second period		14:50 – Seth Griffith (1)
No scoring		Third period		8:44 – sh – Colby Cave (1)
Carter Rowney (1) – 1:09		First overtime period		No scoring
Casey DeSmith 31 saves / 33 shots		Goalie stats		Jeremy Smith 24 saves / 27 shots

April 21	Wilkes-Barre/Scranton Penguins	4 – 3	OT	Providence Bruins	Mohegan Sun Arena at Casey Plaza	Recap
No scoring		First period		2:51 – sh – Noel Acciari (1); 16:52 – Colby Cave (2)
Tim Erixon (1) – 2:46; Daniel Sprong (1) – 6:49; Tom Kostopoulos (1) – 10:40		Second period		No scoring
No scoring		Third period		0:54 – Frank Vatrano (1)
Daniel Sprong (2) – 5:13		First overtime period		No scoring
Casey DeSmith 30 saves / 33 shots		Goalie stats		Jeremy Smith 29 saves / 33 shots

April 23	Providence Bruins	4 – 5	2OT	Wilkes-Barre/Scranton Penguins	Dunkin' Donuts Center	Recap
No scoring		First period		0:35 – Jake Guentzel (2); 10:42 – pp – Dominik Simon (1)
Austin Czarnik (1) – 13:39		Second period		5:36 – pp – Daniel Sprong (3); 18:28 – Tim Erixon (2)
Chris Breen (1) – 2:22; Tommy Cross (1) – pp – 5:30; Austin Czarnik (2) – 16:01		Third period		No scoring
No scoring		Second overtime period		13:52 – Jake Guentzel (3)
Zane McIntyre 9 saves / 13 shots Jeremy Smith 23 saves / 24 shots		Goalie stats		Casey DeSmith 59 saves / 63 shots

Wilkes-Barre/Scranton wins series 3–0

==== (N1) Toronto Marlies vs. (A5) Bridgeport Sound Tigers ====
April 23	Bridgeport Sound Tigers	1 – 4	Toronto Marlies	Webster Bank Arena	Recap
Justin Florek (1) – 11:30		First period	No scoring
No scoring		Second period	4:36 – pp – T. J. Brennan (1); 8:36 – William Nylander (1); 19:43 – Nikita Soshnikov (1); 19:59 – Connor Brown (1)
No scoring		Third period	No scoring
Stephon Williams 35 saves / 39 shots		Goalie stats	Antoine Bibeau 31 saves / 32 shots

April 24	Bridgeport Sound Tigers	0 – 3	Toronto Marlies	Webster Bank Arena	Recap
No scoring		First period	No scoring
No scoring		Second period	12:01 – sh – Connor Brown (2)
No scoring		Third period	2:50 – Ben Smith (1); 17:57 – en – Connor Brown (3)
Stephon Williams 34 saves / 36 shots		Goalie stats	Garret Sparks 31 saves / 31 shots

April 28	Toronto Marlies	6 – 4	Bridgeport Sound Tigers	Ricoh Coliseum	Recap
Connor Carrick (1) – pp – 10:22		First period	6:00 – pp – Marc-Andre Cliche (1)
T. J. Brennan (2) – pp – 14:54; Connor Carrick (2) – 17:07; Connor Carrick (3) – 19:00		Second period	0:42 – Mike Halmo (1); 10:34 – pp – Kyle Burroughs (1); 11:52 – pp – Marc-Andre Cliche (2)
Viktor Loov (1) – 2:51; Zach Hyman (1) – 12:14		Third period	No scoring
Antoine Bibeau 8 saves / 12 shots Garret Sparks 12 saves / 12 shots		Goalie stats	Christopher Gibson 37 saves / 43 shots

Toronto wins series 3–0

==== (N2) Albany Devils vs. (N3) Utica Comets ====
April 22	Albany Devils	3 – 2	Utica Comets	Times Union Center	Recap
Ben Thomson (1) – 6:27		First period	No scoring
Reid Boucher (1) – pp – 4:27		Second period	No scoring
Joseph Blandisi (1) – 10:31		Third period	0:27 – Darren Archibald (1); 15:41 – Jordan Subban (1)
Scott Wedgewood 12 saves / 14 shots		Goalie stats	Richard Bachman 26 saves / 29 shots

April 23	Albany Devils	5 – 1	Utica Comets	Times Union Center	Recap
Ben Thomson (2) – 16:27		First period	9:04 – Cole Cassels (1)
Jim O'Brien (1) – pp – 4:36; Reid Boucher (2) – sh – 7:15; Pavel Zacha (1) – pp – 7:54; Jim O'Brien (2) – 16:54		Second period	No scoring
No scoring		Third period	No scoring
Scott Wedgewood 22 saves / 23 shots		Goalie stats	Richard Bachman 12 saves / 16 shots Joe Cannata 11 saves / 12 shots

April 26	Utica Comets	2 – 1	OT	Albany Devils	Utica Memorial Auditorium	Recap
Jordan Subban (2) – 12:36		First period		17:11 – pp – Mike Sislo (1)
No scoring		Second period		No scoring
No scoring		Third period		No scoring
Alexandre Grenier (1) – 9:13		First overtime period		No scoring
Joe Cannata 27 saves / 28 shots		Goalie stats		Scott Wedgewood 28 saves / 30 shots

April 28	Utica Comets	3 – 6	Albany Devils	Utica Memorial Auditorium	Recap
No scoring		First period	3:53 – Matt Lorito (1); 4:06 – Joseph Blandisi (2); 11:02 – Mike Sislo (2)
Alexandre Grenier (2) – 16:33		Second period	10:55 – Reid Boucher (3); 19:30 – sh – Blake Pietila (1)
Alex Friesen (1) – 4:54; T. J. Hensick (1) – 9:20		Third period	17:43 – en – Blake Pietila (2)
Joe Cannata 23 saves / 28 shots Richard Bachman 5 saves / 5 shots		Goalie stats	Scott Wedgewood 32 saves / 35 shots

Albany wins series 3–1

=== Western Conference ===
==== (C1) Milwaukee Admirals vs. (C4) Grand Rapids Griffins ====
April 22	Milwaukee Admirals	1 – 3	Grand Rapids Griffins	BMO Harris Bradley Center	Recap
Trevor Murphy (1) – pp – 13:30		First period	15:36 – Tyler Bertuzzi (1)
No scoring		Second period	11:44 – Martin Frk (1); 15:04 – Tyler Bertuzzi (2)
No scoring		Third period	No scoring
Juuse Saros 19 saves / 22 shots		Goalie stats	Tom McCollum 32 saves / 33 shots

April 23	Milwaukee Admirals	1 – 2	Grand Rapids Griffins	BMO Harris Bradley Center	Recap
No scoring		First period	5:44 – pp – Anthony Mantha (1)
No scoring		Second period	8:53 – pp – Tyler Bertuzzi (3)
Vladislav Kamenev (1) – pp – 11:32		Third period	No scoring
Juuse Saros 22 saves / 24 shots		Goalie stats	Tom McCollum 31 saves / 32 shots

April 26	Grand Rapids Griffins	4 – 1	Milwaukee Admirals	Van Andel Arena	Recap
No scoring		First period	18:47 – Adam Payerl (1)
Brian Lashoff (3) – 1:17; Anthony Mantha (2) – 2:51; Anthony Mantha (3) – 17:25		Second period	No scoring
Colin Campbell (1) – 12:05		Third period	No scoring
Tom McCollum 28 saves / 29 shots		Goalie stats	Marek Mazanec 22 saves / 26 shots

Grand Rapids wins series 3–0

==== (C2) Lake Erie Monsters vs. (C3) Rockford IceHogs ====
April 20	Rockford IceHogs	2 – 5	Lake Erie Monsters	BMO Harris Bank Center	Recap
No scoring		First period	8:32 – Sonny Milano (1); 19:41 – Zach Werenski (1)
No scoring		Second period	11:11 – pp – Dean Kukan (1)
Tyler Motte (1) – 14:54; Dennis Rasmussen (1) – 16:18		Third period	9:04 – pp – Alex Broadhurst (1); 18:58 – en, pp – Trent Vogelhuber (1)
Mac Carruth 21 saves / 25 shots		Goalie stats	Joonas Korpisalo 28 saves / 30 shots

April 21	Rockford IceHogs	1 – 5	Lake Erie Monsters	BMO Harris Bank Center	Recap
Ryan Hartman (1) – pp – 5:45		First period	No scoring
No scoring		Second period	0:34 – Josh Anderson (1); 3:48 – Oliver Bjorkstrand (1); 4:08 – Lukas Sedlak (1)
No scoring		Third period	15:28 – Josh Anderson (2); 19:24 – en – Josh Anderson (3)
Mac Carruth 34 saves / 38 shots		Goalie stats	Joonas Korpisalo 24 saves / 25 shots

April 23	Lake Erie Monsters	5 – 3	Rockford IceHogs	Quicken Loans Arena	Recap
Josh Anderson (4) – pp – 9:30		First period	No scoring
Zach Werenski (2) – 7:40		Second period	13:54 – Jonathan Carlsson (1)
Daniel Zaar (1) – 10:42; Ryan Craig (1) – 14:58		Third period	8:49 – pp – Tyler Motte (2); 18:34 – Mark McNeill (1)
Joonas Korpisalo 21 saves / 24 shots		Goalie stats	Mac Carruth 21 saves / 26 shots

Lake Erie wins series 3–0

==== (P1) Ontario Reign vs. (P4) San Jose Barracuda ====
April 22	San Jose Barracuda	1 – 2	Ontario Reign	SAP Center	Recap
No scoring		First period	No scoring
No scoring		Second period	9:53 – Kurtis MacDermid (1)
Nikita Jevpalovs (1) – 6:17		Third period	15:57 – Jonny Brodzinski (1)
Aaron Dell 35 saves / 37 shots		Goalie stats	Peter Budaj 28 saves / 29 shots

April 23	San Jose Barracuda	3 – 2	Ontario Reign	SAP Center	Recap
No scoring		First period	No scoring
Ryan Carpenter (1) – 3:58; Bryan Lerg (1) – 13:57		Second period	No scoring
Nikolay Goldobin (1) – 8:23		Third period	2:40 – Kurtis MacDermid (2); 19:25 – Jonny Brodzinski (2)
Aaron Dell 34 saves / 36 shots		Goalie stats	Peter Budaj 12 saves / 15 shots

April 28	Ontario Reign	3 – 1	San Jose Barracuda	Citizens Business Bank Arena	Recap
Adrian Kempe (1) – 7:12		First period	No scoring
Nic Dowd (1) – pp – 2:34		Second period	No scoring
Adrian Kempe (2) – 11:27		Third period	13:28 – Nikolay Goldobin (2)
Peter Budaj 16 saves / 17 shots		Goalie stats	Aaron Dell 36 saves / 39 shots Troy Grosenick 4 saves / 4 shots

April 29	Ontario Reign	4 – 1	San Jose Barracuda	Citizens Business Bank Arena	Recap
Nic Dowd (2) – 9:12		First period	No scoring
Justin Auger (1) – 13:12		Second period	9:58 – Jeremy Langlois (1)
Jordan Samuels-Thomas (1) – 15:33; Andrew Crescenzi (1) – en – 18:33		Third period	No scoring
Peter Budaj 18 saves / 19 shots		Goalie stats	Aaron Dell 31 saves / 34 shots

Ontario wins series 3–1

==== (P2) San Diego Gulls vs. (P3) Texas Stars ====
April 21	Texas Stars	1 – 3	San Diego Gulls	H-E-B Center at Cedar Park	Recap
No scoring		First period	15:00 – Antoine Laganiere (1)
Justin Dowling (1) – sh – 0:39		Second period	15:58 – Nick Ritchie (1)
No scoring		Third period	10:56 – Chris Mueller (1)
Maxime Lagace 14 saves / 17 shots		Goalie stats	Anton Khudobin 28 saves / 29 shots

April 23	Texas Stars	5 – 1	San Diego Gulls	H-E-B Center at Cedar Park	Recap
Derek Hulak (1) – 3:53		First period	10:12 – Nick Ritchie (2)
Esa Lindell (1) – pp – 2:30; Matt Mangene (1) – pp – 19:07		Second period	No scoring
Curtis McKenzie (1) – 5:02; Justin Dowling (2) – 13:36		Third period	No scoring
Jack Campbell 25 saves / 26 shots		Goalie stats	Anton Khudobin 37 saves / 42 shots

April 28	San Diego Gulls	6 – 1	Texas Stars	Valley View Casino Center	Recap
Brandon Montour (1) – pp – 5:55		First period	No scoring
Nick Ritchie (3) – 8:51; Michael Sgarbossa (1) – pp – 11:58; Joseph Cramarossa (1) – 14:27		Second period	No scoring
Stefan Noesen (1) – 5:35; Chris Wagner (1) – 15:21		Third period	3:22 – Esa Lindell (2)
Anton Khudobin 28 saves / 29 shots		Goalie stats	Jack Campbell 42 saves / 48 shots

April 29	San Diego Gulls	6 – 2	Texas Stars	Valley View Casino Center	Recap
Shea Theodore (1) – 6:45		First period	7:46 – Brendan Ranford (1)
Chris Mueller (2) – pp – 0:07; Antoine Laganiere (2) – pp – 1:17; Joseph Cramarossa (2) – sh – 8:20		Second period	No scoring
Ondrej Kase (1) – pp – 7:34; Joseph Cramarossa (3) – en – 17:22		Third period	15:08 – Brett Ritchie (1)
Anton Khudobin 6 saves / 6 shots Matt Hackett 21 saves / 23 shots		Goalie stats	Jack Campbell 14 saves / 18 shots Maxime Lagace 17 saves / 18 shots

San Diego wins series 3–1

== Division finals ==
=== Eastern Conference ===
==== (A1) Hershey Bears vs. (A3) Wilkes-Barre/Scranton Penguins ====
May 4	Hershey Bears	0 – 4	Wilkes-Barre/Scranton Penguins	Giant Center	Recap
No scoring		First period	0:45 – Daniel Sprong (4)
No scoring		Second period	0:14 – Carter Rowney (2)
No scoring		Third period	7:04 – pp – Daniel Sprong (5); 17:07 – sh, en – Tom Kostopoulos (2)
Justin Peters 27 saves / 30 shots		Goalie stats	Casey DeSmith 33 saves / 33 shots

May 6	Hershey Bears	2 – 0	Wilkes-Barre/Scranton Penguins	Giant Center	Recap
Sean Collins (2) – sh – 12:43; Carter Camper (1) – 15:06		First period	No scoring
No scoring		Second period	No scoring
No scoring		Third period	No scoring
Justin Peters 27 saves / 27 shots		Goalie stats	Casey DeSmith 23 saves / 25 shots

May 7	Wilkes-Barre/Scranton Penguins	2 – 5	Hershey Bears	Mohegan Sun Arena at Casey Plaza	Recap
No scoring		First period	18:40 – Dustin Gazley (1)
No scoring		Second period	12:34 – pp – Chris Bourque (2); 14:08 – Jakub Vrana (3)
Niclas Andersen (1) – 1:02; Jake Guentzel (4) – pp – 8:52		Third period	0:32 – Chris Bourque (3); 2:52 – Liam O'Brien (1)
Casey DeSmith 17 saves / 22 shots Tristan Jarry 5 saves / 5 shots		Goalie stats	Justin Peters 22 saves / 24 shots

May 9	Wilkes-Barre/Scranton Penguins	2 – 1	OT	Hershey Bears	Mohegan Sun Arena at Casey Plaza	Recap
No scoring		First period		No scoring
Tom Kostopoulos (3) – pp – 5:53		Second period		9:37 – pp – Carter Camper (2)
No scoring		Third period		No scoring
Kael Mouillierat (1) – pp – 2:31		First overtime period		No scoring
Tristan Jarry 22 saves / 23 shots		Goalie stats		Justin Peters 28 saves / 30 shots

May 11	Hershey Bears	5 – 3	Wilkes-Barre/Scranton Penguins	Giant Center	Recap
Carter Camper (3) – 5:45; Jakub Vrana (4) – pp – 17:40		First period	No scoring
Sean Collins (3) – 12:43		Second period	9:44 – Tom Kostopoulos (4); 14:38 – Josh Archibald (1)
Zach Sill (1) – sh – 5:57; Ryan Bourque (1) – en – 18:59		Third period	3:53 – Tom Sestito (1)
Justin Peters 29 saves / 32 shots		Goalie stats	Tristan Jarry 10 saves / 13 shots Casey DeSmith 10 saves / 11 shots

May 13	Wilkes-Barre/Scranton Penguins	6 – 2	Hershey Bears	Mohegan Sun Arena at Casey Plaza	Recap
Kael Mouillierat (2) – 10:52; Tom Kostopoulos (5) – 15:16; Carter Rowney (3) – 18:22; Will O'Neill (1) – pp – 19:48		First period	No scoring
Jake Guentzel (5) – 15:39		Second period	12:51 – Tyler Lewington (3)
Carter Rowney (4) – 3:30		Third period	16:29 – pp – Zach Sill (2)
Casey DeSmith 24 saves / 26 shots		Goalie stats	Justin Peters 8 saves / 12 shots Dan Ellis 17 saves / 19 shots

May 15	Hershey Bears	3 – 2	OT	Wilkes-Barre/Scranton Penguins	Giant Center	Recap
Dustin Gazley (2) – 1:33		First period		7:15 – pp – Matthias Plachta (1)
Carter Camper (4) – 18:43		Second period		No scoring
No scoring		Third period		3:53 – Kael Mouillierat (3)
Travis Boyd (2) – 10:57		First overtime period		No scoring
Justin Peters 32 saves / 34 shots		Goalie stats		Casey DeSmith 21 saves / 24 shots

Hershey wins series 4–3

==== (N1) Toronto Marlies vs. (N2) Albany Devils ====
May 4	Toronto Marlies	1 – 2	Albany Devils	Ricoh Coliseum	Recap
Connor Carrick (4) – 9:40		First period	8:31 – pp – Brian O'Neill (1); 10:41 – Matt Lorito (2)
No scoring		Second period	No scoring
No scoring		Third period	No scoring
Garret Sparks 27 saves / 29 shots		Goalie stats	Scott Wedgewood 32 saves / 33 shots

May 6	Toronto Marlies	5 – 3	Albany Devils	Ricoh Coliseum	Recap
Ben Smith (2) – 11:20		First period	12:38 – Dan Kelly (1); 15:26 – Nick Lappin (1)
T. J. Brennan (3) – pp – 10:36		Second period	No scoring
Zach Hyman (2) – 2:02; T. J. Brennan (4) – 6:43; Zach Hyman (3) – 18:15		Third period	3:52 – Matt Lorito (3)
Antoine Bibeau 40 saves / 43 shots		Goalie stats	Scott Wedgewood 27 saves / 32 shots

May 8	Albany Devils	3 – 2	OT	Toronto Marlies	Times Union Center	Recap
Rod Pelley (1) – sh – 8:33		First period		No scoring
No scoring		Second period		3:50 – Josh Leivo (1)
Nick Lappin (2) – sh – 19:39		Third period		8:30 – William Nylander (2)
Nick Lappin (3) – pp – 18:40		First overtime period		No scoring
Scott Wedgewood 25 saves / 27 shots		Goalie stats		Antoine Bibeau 36 saves / 39 shots

May 10	Albany Devils	2 – 7	Toronto Marlies	Times Union Center	Recap
Blake Pietila (3) – 2:10		First period	13:17 – pp – Mark Arcobello (1); 18:48 – pp – Kasperi Kapanen (1)
No scoring		Second period	1:05 – pp – T. J. Brennan (5); 14:10 – pp – Brendan Leipsic (1); 18:39 – Nikita Soshnikov (2)
Graham Black (1) – 19:40		Third period	1:36 – Nikita Soshnikov (3); 10:27 – Connor Brown (4)
Scott Wedgewood 12 saves / 17 shots Yann Danis 7 saves / 9 shots		Goalie stats	Antoine Bibeau 24 saves / 26 shots

May 12	Albany Devils	1 – 5	Toronto Marlies	Times Union Center	Recap
No scoring		First period	No scoring
Paul Thompson (1) – 17:01		Second period	1:23 – pp – Connor Carrick (5); 6:38 – pp – Connor Brown (5); 15:19 – Nikita Soshnikov (4)
No scoring		Third period	11:09 – Brendan Leipsic (2); 17:52 – en – Josh Leivo (2)
Scott Wedgewood 18 saves / 22 shots		Goalie stats	Antoine Bibeau 21 saves / 22 shots

May 14	Toronto Marlies	1 – 4	Albany Devils	Ricoh Coliseum	Recap
No scoring		First period	4:24 – Reid Boucher (4); 5:13 – Corbin McPherson (1)
Kasperi Kapanen (2) – 10:45		Second period	14:42 – Nick Lappin (4)
No scoring		Third period	8:56 – Graham Black (2)
Antoine Bibeau 24 saves / 28 shots		Goalie stats	Scott Wedgewood 34 saves / 35 shots

May 16	Toronto Marlies	4 – 3	Albany Devils	Ricoh Coliseum	Recap
Connor Brown (6) – sh – 2:56		First period	No scoring
No scoring		Second period	0:46 – Paul Thompson (2)
Kasperi Kapanen (3) – 9:07; Connor Carrick (6) – 12:59; Richard Clune (1) – 17:30		Third period	2:41 – Nick Lappin (5); 15:19 – Paul Thompson (3)
Antoine Bibeau 25 saves / 28 shots		Goalie stats	Scott Wedgewood 20 saves / 24 shots

Toronto wins series 4–3

=== Western Conference ===
==== (C2) Lake Erie Monsters vs. (C4) Grand Rapids Griffins ====
May 5	Lake Erie Monsters	3 – 2	OT	Grand Rapids Griffins	Quicken Loans Arena	Recap
No scoring		First period		No scoring
Lukas Sedlak (2) – 4:29; Alex Broadhurst (2) – pp – 11:29		Second period		0:58 – Eric Tangradi (1); 16:11 – sh – Brian Lashoff (2)
No scoring		Third period		No scoring
Oliver Bjorkstrand (3) – pp – 12:23		First overtime period		No scoring
Joonas Korpisalo 22 saves / 24 shots		Goalie stats		Tom McCollum 36 saves / 39 shots

May 7	Lake Erie Monsters	4 – 3	Grand Rapids Griffins	Quicken Loans Arena	Recap
Sonny Milano (2) – pp – 14:39; Steve Eminger (1) – pp – 17:33		First period	19:56 – pp – Eric Tangradi (2)
No scoring		Second period	2:05 – Xavier Ouellet (1); 14:58 – pp – Andy Miele (1)
Ryan Craig (2) – 14:10; Daniel Zaar (2) – 16:46		Third period	No scoring
Joonas Korpisalo 23 saves / 26 shots		Goalie stats	Tom McCollum 16 saves / 20 shots

May 8	Grand Rapids Griffins	1 – 2	Lake Erie Monsters	Van Andel Arena	Recap
No scoring		First period	0:17 – Josh Anderson (5)
Ryan Sproul (1) – 17:48		Second period	8:07 – Zach Werenski (3)
No scoring		Third period	No scoring
Tom McCollum 21 saves / 23 shots		Goalie stats	Joonas Korpisalo 41 saves / 42 shots

May 10	Grand Rapids Griffins	5 – 4	Lake Erie Monsters	Van Andel Arena	Recap
Tyler Bertuzzi (4) – 13:32		First period	8:33 – pp – Michael Chaput (1); 14:26 – Sonny Milano (3)
Anthony Mantha (4) – pp – 19:05		Second period	8:36 – Lukas Sedlak (3); 13:31 – Oliver Bjorkstrand (4)
Louis-Marc Aubry (1) – 3:12; Robbie Russo (1) – 4:40; Andreas Athanasiou (1) – 18:05		Third period	No scoring
Tom McCollum 17 saves / 21 shots Jared Coreau 16 saves / 16 shots		Goalie stats	Joonas Korpisalo 30 saves / 35 shots

May 14	Lake Erie Monsters	1 – 6	Grand Rapids Griffins	Quicken Loans Arena	Recap
Kerby Rychel (1) – 16:42		First period	No scoring
No scoring		Second period	1:56 – Andy Miele (2); 5:03 – Tyler Bertuzzi (5); 16:52 – Andreas Athanasiou (2)
No scoring		Third period	7:55 – Tyler Bertuzzi (6); 13:25 – pp – Nathan Paetsch (1); 16:40 – Tyler Bertuzzi (7)
Joonas Korpisalo 25 saves / 30 shots Anton Forsberg 5 saves / 6 shots		Goalie stats	Jared Coreau 35 saves / 36 shots

May 16	Grand Rapids Griffins	3 – 4	OT	Lake Erie Monsters	Van Andel Arena	Recap
Ryan Sproul (2) – 0:34; Tomas Nosek (1) – 2:16		First period		3:42 – Daniel Zaar (3)
Xavier Ouellet (2) – pp – 1:48		Second period		8:18 – Michael Chaput (2)
No scoring		Third period		1:43 – Lukas Sedlak (4)
No scoring		First overtime period		12:32 – Zach Werenski (4)
Jared Coreau 43 saves / 47 shots		Goalie stats		Joonas Korpisalo 6 saves / 9 shots Anton Forsberg 23 saves / 23 shots

Lake Erie wins series 4–2

==== (P1) Ontario Reign vs. (P2) San Diego Gulls ====
May 5	Ontario Reign	5 – 3	San Diego Gulls	Citizens Business Bank Arena	Recap
Michael Mersch (1) – 10:26; Vincent LoVerde (1) – pp – 14:37		First period	No scoring
Joel Lowry (1) – 14:37		Second period	3:06 – Kalle Kossila (1); 5:32 – Matt Bailey (1)
Michael Mersch (2) – 9:11; Jeff Schultz (1) – sh, en – 19:27		Third period	17:37 – Corey Tropp (1)
Peter Budaj 16 saves / 19 shots		Goalie stats	Matt Hackett 24 saves / 28 shots

May 7	San Diego Gulls	1 – 2	OT	Ontario Reign	Valley View Casino Center	Recap
Nick Ritchie (4) – 3:22		First period		No scoring
No scoring		Second period		No scoring
No scoring		Third period		1:39 – pp – Kris Newbury (1)
No scoring		First overtime period		11:55 – Justin Auger (2)
Matt Hackett 42 saves / 44 shots		Goalie stats		Peter Budaj 26 saves / 27 shots

May 8	Ontario Reign	0 – 3	San Diego Gulls	Citizens Business Bank Arena	Recap
No scoring		First period	18:27 – Kalle Kossila (2)
No scoring		Second period	No scoring
No scoring		Third period	8:18 – pp – Nick Ritchie (5); 16:49 – en – Jaycob Megna (1)
Peter Budaj 22 saves / 24 shots		Goalie stats	Matt Hackett 29 saves / 29 shots

May 13	San Diego Gulls	3 – 4	OT	Ontario Reign	Valley View Casino Center	Recap
No scoring		First period		No scoring
Shea Theodore (2) – pp – 7:21		Second period		No scoring
Chris Mueller (3) – 11:02; Chris Mueller (4) – 14:06		Third period		3:47 – Nic Dowd (3); 12:04 – Adrian Kempe (3); 13:56 – Adrian Kempe (4)
No scoring		First overtime period		6:29 – Mike Amadio (1)
Matt Hackett 33 saves / 37 shots		Goalie stats		Peter Budaj 25 saves / 28 shots

May 14	Ontario Reign	2 – 1	San Diego Gulls	Citizens Business Bank Arena	Recap
No scoring		First period	No scoring
Joel Lowry (2) – 2:33; Justin Auger (3) – 8:56		Second period	8:31 – Chris Wagner (2)
No scoring		Third period	No scoring
Peter Budaj 15 saves / 16 shots		Goalie stats	Matt Hackett 24 saves / 26 shots

Ontario wins series 4–1

== Conference finals ==
=== Eastern Conference ===
==== (N1) Toronto Marlies vs. (A1) Hershey Bears ====
May 20	Hershey Bears	3 – 1	Toronto Marlies	Giant Center	Recap
No scoring		First period	9:04 – William Nylander (3)
Carter Camper (5) – 3:39		Second period	No scoring
Liam O'Brien (2) – 2:51; Zach Sill (3) – pp – 8:12		Third period	No scoring
Justin Peters 19 saves / 20 shots		Goalie stats	Antoine Bibeau 20 saves / 23 shots

May 21	Hershey Bears	3 – 2	OT	Toronto Marlies	Giant Center	Recap
Chandler Stephenson (1) – 14:06		First period		6:33 – Connor Brown (7)
Jakub Vrana (5) – pp – 7:55		Second period		17:42 – Mark Arcobello (2)
No scoring		Third period		No scoring
Carter Camper (6) – 9:09		First overtime period		No scoring
Justin Peters 38 saves / 40 shots		Goalie stats		Garret Sparks 20 saves / 23 shots

May 25	Toronto Marlies	2 – 8	Hershey Bears	Ricoh Coliseum	Recap
Josh Leivo (3) – 6:06; Colin Smith (1) – 8:09		First period	3:02 – Dustin Gazley (3)
No scoring		Second period	6:12 – Chris Bourque (4); 19:07 – Zach Sill (4)
No scoring		Third period	0:18 – sh – Zach Sill (5); 1:42 – sh – Ryan Bourque (2); 5:13 – Jakub Vrana (6); 6:12 – pp – Christian Djoos (3); 16:14 – Jakub Vrana (7)
Antoine Bibeau 14 saves / 18 shots Garret Sparks 7 saves / 11 shots		Goalie stats	Justin Peters 26 saves / 28 shots

May 27	Toronto Marlies	5 – 0	Hershey Bears	Ricoh Coliseum	Recap
William Nylander (4) – 19:28		First period	No scoring
William Nylander (5) – 18:35		Second period	No scoring
Josh Leivo (4) – pp – 6:59; Connor Carrick (7) – pp – 7:24; William Nylander (6) – pp – 15:57		Third period	No scoring
Antoine Bibeau 18 saves / 18 shots		Goalie stats	Justin Peters 28 saves / 33 shots

May 29	Toronto Marlies	2 – 3	Hershey Bears	Ricoh Coliseum	Recap
No scoring		First period	9:18 – Liam O'Brien (3)
William Nylander (7) – 8:05		Second period	1:09 – Christian Djoos (2); 2:13 – Nathan Walker (2)
Nikita Soshnikov (5) – 5:11		Third period	No scoring
Antoine Bibeau 17 saves / 20 shots		Goalie stats	Justin Peters 21 saves / 23 shots

Hershey wins series 4–1

=== Western Conference ===
==== (P1) Ontario Reign vs. (C2) Lake Erie Monsters ====
May 21	Ontario Reign	3 – 4	Lake Erie Monsters	Citizens Business Bank Arena	Recap
No scoring		First period	No scoring
Sean Backman (1) – pp – 4:23		Second period	7:10 – Lukas Sedlak (5); 8:23 – pp – Josh Anderson (6); 9:46 – Ryan Craig (3)
Nic Dowd (4) – 1:38; Joel Lowry (3) – 8:16		Third period	8:35 – Alex Broadhurst (3)
Peter Budaj 30 saves / 34 shots		Goalie stats	Anton Forsberg 27 saves / 30 shots

May 22	Ontario Reign	2 – 3	Lake Erie Monsters	Citizens Business Bank Arena	Recap
No scoring		First period	12:28 – Markus Hannikainen (1); 12:40 – Lukas Sedlak (6)
No scoring		Second period	4:40 – pp – T. J. Tynan (1)
Paul Bissonnette (1) – 5:31; Kevin Gravel (1) – 12:48		Third period	No scoring
Peter Budaj 18 saves / 21 shots		Goalie stats	Anton Forsberg 27 saves / 29 shots

May 24	Lake Erie Monsters	4 – 0	Ontario Reign	Quicken Loans Arena	Recap
Oliver Bjorkstrand (5) – 6:00; Sonny Milano (4) – 7:50; Josh Anderson (7) – 10:27		First period	No scoring
Markus Hannikainen (2) – 16:31		Second period	No scoring
No scoring		Third period	No scoring
Anton Forsberg 26 saves / 26 shots		Goalie stats	Peter Budaj 17 saves / 21 shots Michael Houser 6 saves / 6 shots

May 26	Lake Erie Monsters	2 – 1	2OT	Ontario Reign	Quicken Loans Arena	Recap
Lukas Sedlak (7) – 6:26		First period		No scoring
No scoring		Second period		No scoring
No scoring		Third period		2:44 – Joel Lowry (4)
Lukas Sedlak (8) – 6:25		Second overtime period		No scoring
Anton Forsberg 41 saves / 42 shots		Goalie stats		Peter Budaj 29 saves / 31 shots

Lake Erie wins series 4–0

== Calder Cup Finals ==
=== Hershey Bears vs. Lake Erie Monsters ===
June 1	Hershey Bears	1 – 4	Lake Erie Monsters	Giant Center	Recap
Jakub Vrana (8) – 15:42		First period	No scoring
No scoring		Second period	7:48 – Daniel Zaar (4)
No scoring		Third period	5:39 – Trent Vogelhuber (2); 13:33 – Daniel Zaar (5); 15:09 – Markus Hannikainen (3)
Justin Peters 22 saves / 26 shots		Goalie stats	Anton Forsberg 26 saves / 27 shots

June 3	Hershey Bears	3 – 5	Lake Erie Monsters	Giant Center	Recap
No scoring		First period	3:05 – pp – Zach Werenski (5)
Zach Sill (6) – pp – 8:48		Second period	4:29 – Oliver Bjorkstrand (6); 13:51 – Lukas Sedlak (9)
Tyler Lewington (4) – 9:57; Liam O'Brien (4) – 11:51		Third period	2:04 – pp – Oliver Bjorkstrand (7); 18:59 – en – Daniel Zaar (6)
Justin Peters 24 saves / 28 shots		Goalie stats	Anton Forsberg 27 saves / 30 shots

June 6	Lake Erie Monsters	3 – 2	OT	Hershey Bears	Quicken Loans Arena	Recap
Oliver Bjorkstrand (8) – 6:44		First period		2:07 – Ryan Stanton (3)
Daniel Zaar (7) – pp – 18:13		Second period		19:00 – Dustin Gazley (4)
No scoring		Third period		No scoring
Oliver Bjorkstrand (9) – 1:20		First overtime period		No scoring
Anton Forsberg 17 saves / 19 shots		Goalie stats		Justin Peters 25 saves / 28 shots

June 11	Lake Erie Monsters	1 – 0	OT	Hershey Bears	Quicken Loans Arena	Recap
No scoring		First period		No scoring
No scoring		Second period		No scoring
No scoring		Third period		No scoring
Oliver Bjorkstrand (10) – 19:58		First overtime period		No scoring
Anton Forsberg 23 saves / 23 shots		Goalie stats		Justin Peters 32 saves / 33 shots

Lake Erie wins series 4–0

== Playoff statistical leaders ==
=== Leading skaters ===
These are the top ten skaters based on points. If there is a tie in points, goals take precedence over assists.

GP = Games played; G = Goals; A = Assists; Pts = Points; +/– = Plus–minus; PIM = Penalty minutes

Player	Team	GP	G	A	Pts	PIM
Connor Carrick	Toronto Marlies	15	7	11	18	12
Carter Camper	Hershey Bears	21	6	11	17	2
Oliver Bjorkstrand	Lake Erie Monsters	17	10	6	16	2
Lukas Sedlak	Lake Erie Monsters	17	9	7	16	18
Jakub Vrana	Hershey Bears	21	8	6	14	2
Jake Guentzel	Wilkes-Barre/Scranton Penguins	10	5	9	14	0
Zach Werenski	Lake Erie Monsters	17	5	9	14	2
Ryan Craig	Lake Erie Monsters	17	3	10	13	8
Josh Anderson	Lake Erie Monsters	15	7	5	12	24
Daniel Zaar	Lake Erie Monsters	17	7	5	12	4

=== Leading goaltenders ===
This is a combined table of the top five goaltenders based on goals against average and the top five goaltenders based on save percentage with at least 180 minutes played. The table is initially sorted by goals against average, with the criterion for inclusion in bold.

GP = Games played; W = Wins; L = Losses; SA = Shots against; GA = Goals against; GAA = Goals against average; SV% = Save percentage; SO = Shutouts; TOI = Time on ice (in minutes)

Player	Team	GP	W	L	SA	GA	GAA	SV%	SO	TOI
Anton Forsberg	Lake Erie Monsters	10	9	0	255	13	**1.34**	**.949**	2	583:58
Justin Peters	Hershey Bears	20	11	9	567	44	**2.13**	**.922**	2	1242:20
Mike McKenna	Portland Pirates	5	2	3	146	12	**2.13**	.918	0	338:20
Peter Budaj	Ontario Reign	13	7	6	301	29	**2.18**	.904	0	799:38
Anton Khudobin	San Diego Gulls	4	2	1	106	7	**2.26**	**.934**	0	185:28
Matt Hackett	San Diego Gulls	6	2	4	187	14	2.27	**.925**	1	369:33
Aaron Dell	San Jose Barracuda	4	1	3	146	10	2.59	**.932**	0	231:17

Preceded by 2015 Calder Cup playoffs	Calder Cup playoffs 2016	Succeeded by 2017 Calder Cup playoffs
