= Garret Sparks =

American ice hockey player (born 1993)

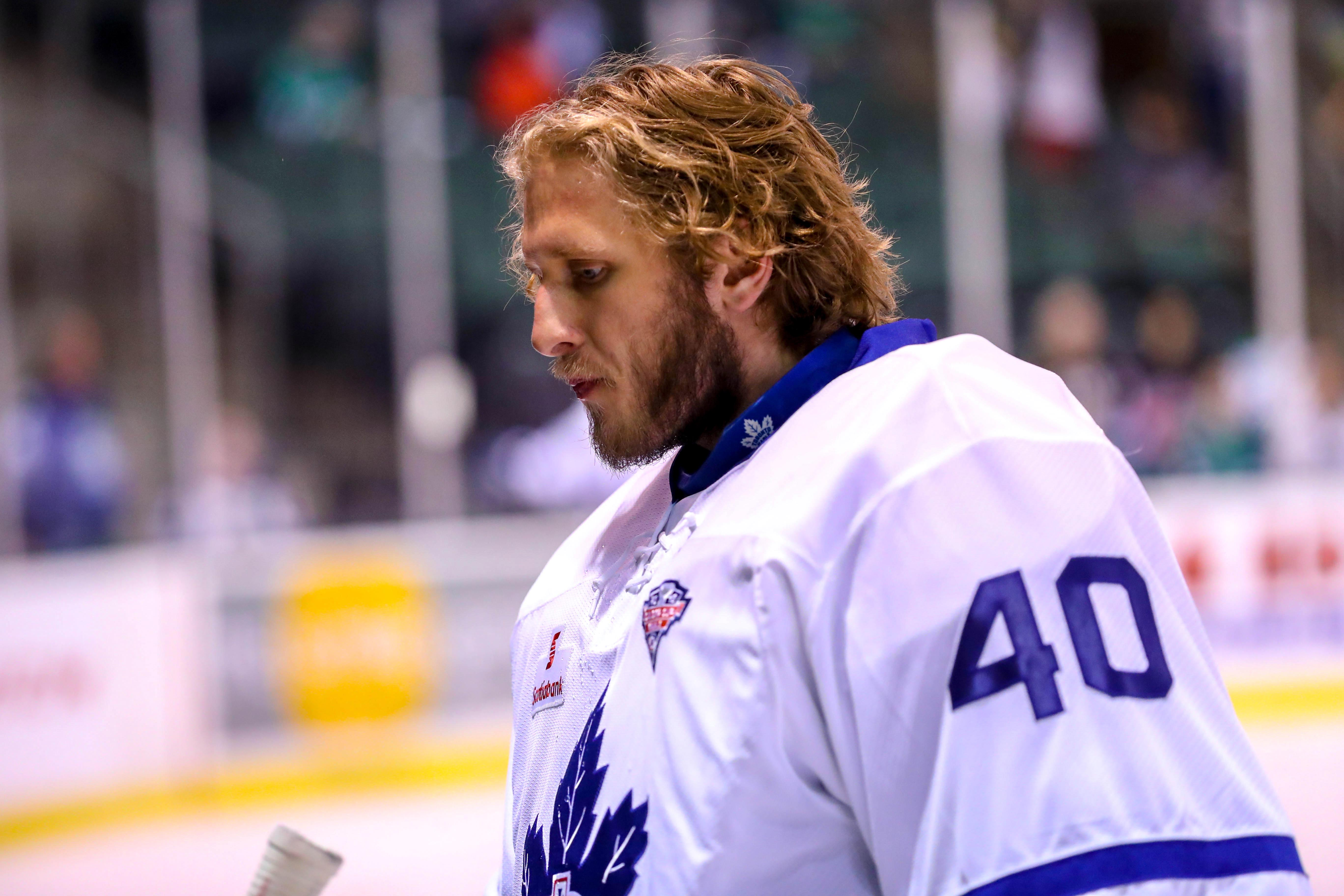
- Sparks with the Toronto Marlies in 2018
- Born: June 28, 1993 (age 33) Elmhurst, Illinois, U.S.
- Height: 6 ft 3 in (191 cm)
- Weight: 210 lb (95 kg; 15 st 0 lb)
- Position: Goaltender
- Catches: Left
- ECHL team Former teams: Bloomington Bison; Toronto Maple Leafs; Vegas Golden Knights; Orlando Solar Bears; Stockton Heat; Los Angeles Kings; Springfield Thunderbirds; WBS Penguins
- NHL draft: 190th overall, 2011; Toronto Maple Leafs
- Playing career: 2013–present

Medal record

Representing United States

Ice hockey

World Junior Championships
Gold medal – first place	2013 Russia	

Garret Sparks (born June 28, 1993) is an American professional ice hockey goaltender who plays for the Bloomington Bison of the ECHL. Sparks was drafted by the Toronto Maple Leafs in the seventh round, 190th overall, in the 2011 NHL Entry Draft. As of 2021, he is one of only 26 goaltenders in league history, and the third most recent, to record a shutout in his NHL debut; Sparks was also the third Maple Leafs goaltender to do so. In 2018, Sparks was awarded the Harry "Hap" Holmes Memorial Award as the AHL goaltender with the lowest goals against average, which helped lead the Toronto Marlies to their first Calder Cup.

Sparks' goaltender equipment are a tribute to former NHL players Trevor Kidd and Curtis Joseph, who wore similar designs during their playing careers. He originally wore Curtis Joseph's #31 with Toronto before Frederik Andersen joined the team and claimed the number.

== Playing career ==
=== Junior and minor leagues ===
Sparks played minor league hockey with Chicago Mission of the Tier 1 Elite Hockey League, before joining the Guelph Storm of the Ontario Hockey League (OHL) in 2010. He was drafted by the club in the eighth round, 160th overall in the 2009 OHL Priority Selection. Sparks made 19 appearances for the Storm, going 8–6–1 for a .890 save percentage, playing well enough to be picked by the Toronto Maple Leafs 190th overall in the 2011 NHL Entry Draft. Sparks would spend the next two seasons with the Storm, briefly playing in three games for the Maple Leafs' American Hockey League (AHL) affiliate, the Toronto Marlies, at the end of the 2012–13 season. In 2013, Sparks represented the United States and won gold at the 2013 World Junior Ice Hockey Championship in Russia. The next year, Sparks would split time between the Marlies and the Orlando Solar Bears of the ECHL.

=== Professional ===
==== Toronto Maple Leafs (2015–19) ====
Entering the 2014–15 season, Sparks was expected to be the Marlies' starting goaltender. However, a poor training camp lead to goaltenders Christopher Gibson and Antoine Bibeau beating him out on the depth chart, forcing management into sending Sparks down to the Solar Bears for most of the season, only seeing brief time with the Marlies when one of their goaltenders was injured. Sparks excelled with Orlando, recording a .936 save percentage in the regular season and a .921 save percentage in the playoffs.

During the following season, Gibson was traded to the New York Islanders as part of a trade for Michael Grabner, leaving an empty roster spot on the Marlies. Sparks succeeded in retaining the job and served as the backup to Bibeau to start the season. However, an injury to Jonathan Bernier on the Maple Leafs forced management to call up Bibeau, leaving Sparks the temporary starter. Sparks excelled and was named the AHL's First Star of the Week for November 8, 2015. Sparks had stopped 96 of 101 shots faced during his time as the starter in Bibeau's absence, which was good enough to hold starting duties once Bibeau returned. When injury once again plagued the Maple Leafs (this time befalling James Reimer), Sparks was called-up due to his recent solid play.

Following a poor showing against the Washington Capitals after which Jonathan Bernier was publicly criticized by Maple Leafs head coach Mike Babcock in a post-game interview, Sparks was informed that he would make his first NHL start on November 30, 2015. In his debut, he recorded 24 saves and a 3–0 shutout win at home against the Edmonton Oilers, the first time in Maple Leafs history that a goaltender recorded a shutout in his debut. Sparks would play in the next few games before himself suffering an injury. After recovering, Sparks was sent down to the Marlies. He would see time as the Marlies' backup, as Bibeau had been playing strong. In an effort to earn Sparks more ice time, he was sent down to the Solar Bears. He would play one game for the Solar Bears before being brought back to the Marlies. In doing so, Sparks achieved a rare feat of playing in all three of the NHL, AHL and ECHL in the same season.

On February 27, 2016, Sparks was called up by the Maple Leafs following the trade of starting goaltender James Reimer. Sparks would play the remainder of the season with the Maple Leafs, recording disappointing numbers. Following the completion of the campaign, and with the Maple Leafs out of contention to qualify for the 2016 Stanley Cup playoffs, Sparks was sent down to the Marlies to help the first place team in their 2016 Calder Cup playoffs run. Despite being favorites to win, the Marlies suffered a third-round exit to the Hershey Bears.

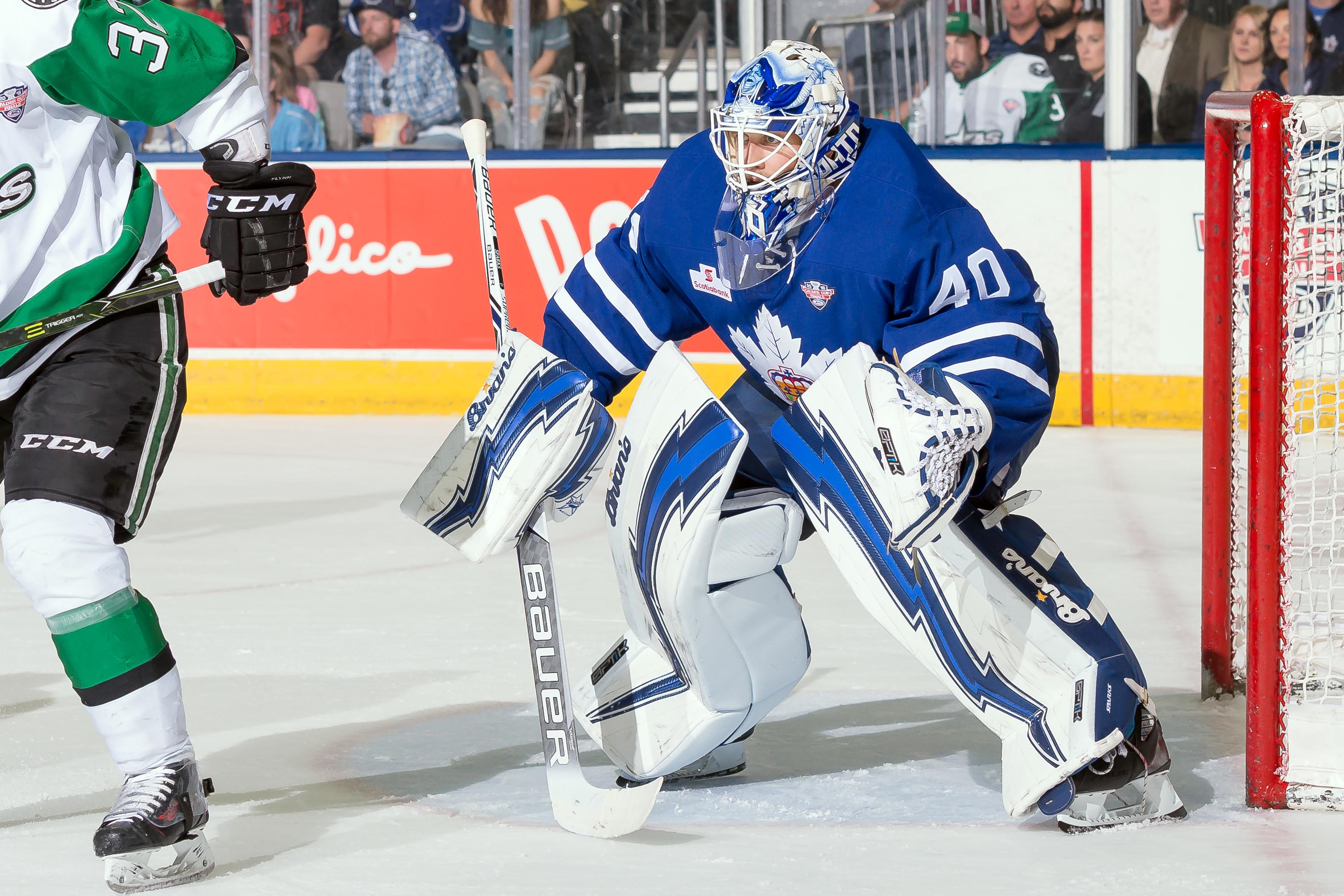
Sparks with the Toronto Marlies during the 2018 Calder Cup Final

In the off-season, Sparks was qualified by the Maple Leafs, in order to retain his negotiating rights. On July 15, 2016, Sparks signed a one-year, two-way contract with the Maple Leafs worth the league minimum $575,000 at the NHL level and $100,000 at the AHL level, with a guarantee of $150,000. In November 2016, Sparks was suspended indefinitely by the Maple Leafs for violating team policy after directing violent and sexist language toward a user in an online hockey related Facebook group he is an admiminstrator of. Responding in defense of someone with disabilities who users were mocking, Sparks wrote, "I want to go to open hockey with you, drag you out to center ice and beat you into a [expletive] pulp until you can't run that [expletive] little mouth of yours. God, you sound like a 13-year-old girl." When another member objected to Sparks' language, he added, "Girls don't even whine as much as this guy does." Sparks returned to the team later in December.

During the 2017–18 AHL season, Sparks was named the AHL's goaltender of the month of January after he recorded a 5–0–0–1 record, including two shutouts. He was called up to the NHL on an emergency basis in March, but was sent down without seeing any playing time. At the conclusion of the 2017–18 season, Sparks was voted the AHL's Top Goaltender of the season and named to the First All-Star team after amassing a 30–9–2 record and a league-leading .936 save percentage. On April 15, 2018, Sparks and fellow Marlies goaltender Calvin Pickard were awarded the Harry "Hap" Holmes Memorial Award.

Sparks began the 2018–19 season in the NHL after the Toronto Maple Leafs placed goaltenders Curtis McElhinney and Calvin Pickard on waivers, facilitating their departures from the organization. On March 5, 2019, Sparks signed a new one-year, $750,000 contract with the Maple Leafs effective for the 2019–20 season. Following a poor finish to the 2018–19 regular season in which Sparks lost 8 of his last 11 starts while posting a .895 save percentage, Sparks was effectively removed from the Maple Leafs roster after Michael Hutchinson was called up from the Marlies to serve as Frederik Andersen's backup for the final game of the regular season. On April 5, 2019, it was announced that Sparks would be spending ten days practicing with Maple Leafs goaltender coach Steve Briere away from the team.

==== Vegas Golden Knights (2019–20) ====
On July 23, 2019, Sparks was traded to the Vegas Golden Knights for David Clarkson and a fourth-round pick in the 2020 NHL Entry Draft. Prior to the 2019–20 season, after attending the Golden Knights training camp, Sparks was placed on waivers on September 21, 2019.

==== Stockton Heat (2020–21) ====
On December 1, 2020, it was announced that the Orlando Solar Bears of the ECHL had signed Sparks to a one-year ECHL contract. He played in six games for the Solar Bears, where he recorded a .928 save percentage, 2.21 goals-against-average and a 4–1–1 record. On December 28, the Calgary Flames invited Sparks to their 2020–21 training camp on a professional try out agreement, however Sparks was later released by the Flames on January 13, 2021, after being assigned to the AHL group in training camp. Sparks briefly returned to the Solar Bears before he was signed to a professional tryout agreement with the Flames affiliate, the Stockton Heat, on February 10, 2021. He appeared in 16 games with the Heat posting a .913 save percentage, 2.69 goals-against average, and 5–10–0 record.

==== Los Angeles Kings (2021–2022) ====
At the conclusion of his contract with the Heat, Sparks was signed as a free agent to a one-year, two-way NHL deal with the Los Angeles Kings on July 28, 2021.

==== ECHL and AHL (2023–present) ====
Remaining an unsigned free agent into the 2022–23 season, Sparks was belatedly signed in a return to the Orlando Solar Bears of the ECHL on January 24, 2023. He featured in 13 games with the Solar Bears before signing a professional tryout contract with the Springfield Thunderbirds of the AHL, affiliate to the St. Louis Blues, on March 16, 2023.

The Wilkes-Barre/Scranton Penguins announced on July 18, 2023, that Sparks had signed a contract for the 2023–24 season with the team.

== Career statistics ==
=== Regular season and playoffs ===
			Regular season									Playoffs
Season	Team	League	GP	W	L	T/OT	MIN	GA	SO	GAA	SV%	GP	W	L	MIN	GA	SO	GAA	SV%
2010–11	Guelph Storm	OHL	19	8	6	1	972	59	0	3.64	.890	—	—	—	—	—	—	—	—
2011–12	Guelph Storm	OHL	59	27	25	4	3304	171	5	3.11	.907	6	2	4	323	24	0	4.45	.881
2012–13	Guelph Storm	OHL	60	36	17	4	3440	152	7	2.65	.917	5	1	4	275	14	0	3.05	.920
2012–13	Toronto Marlies	AHL	3	2	0	1	189	8	0	2.53	.895	1	0	0	14	1	0	4.23	.900
2013–14	Toronto Marlies	AHL	21	11	6	1	1094	48	0	2.63	.915	—	—	—	—	—	—	—	—
2013–14	Orlando Solar Bears	ECHL	10	4	6	0	552	26	1	2.82	.916	—	—	—	—	—	—	—	—
2014–15	Toronto Marlies	AHL	2	1	0	0	120	2	1	1.00	.966	—	—	—	—	—	—	—	—
2014–15	Orlando Solar Bears	ECHL	36	21	7	3	1946	76	5	2.34	.936	6	2	4	342	17	0	2.98	.921
2015–16	Toronto Marlies	AHL	21	14	4	3	1212	47	3	2.33	.928	5	2	2	235	9	1	2.30	.915
2015–16	Toronto Maple Leafs	NHL	17	6	9	1	975	49	1	3.02	.893	—	—	—	—	—	—	—	—
2015–16	Orlando Solar Bears	ECHL	1	1	0	0	60	1	0	1.00	.962	—	—	—	—	—	—	—	—
2016–17	Toronto Marlies	AHL	31	21	9	0	1774	64	5	2.16	.922	2	1	1	98	4	0	2.46	.900
2017–18	Toronto Marlies	AHL	43	31	9	2	2507	75	6	1.79	.936	19	14	5	1134	42	2	2.22	.915
2018–19	Toronto Maple Leafs	NHL	20	8	9	1	1105	58	1	3.15	.902	—	—	—	—	—	—	—	—
2019–20	Chicago Wolves	AHL	26	8	14	4	1527	70	2	2.75	.908	—	—	—	—	—	—	—	—
2019–20	Vegas Golden Knights	NHL	1	0	0	0	28	2	0	4.38	.857	—	—	—	—	—	—	—	—
2020–21	Orlando Solar Bears	ECHL	6	4	1	1	379	14	0	2.21	.928	—	—	—	—	—	—	—	—
2020–21	Stockton Heat	AHL	16	5	10	0	891	40	0	2.69	.913	—	—	—	—	—	—	—	—
2021–22	Ontario Reign	AHL	12	5	5	0	646	35	0	3.25	.896	2	0	2	127	9	0	4.24	.877
2021–22	Los Angeles Kings	NHL	2	1	0	0	98	3	0	1.85	.936	—	—	—	—	—	—	—	—
2022–23	Orlando Solar Bears	ECHL	14	7	4	3	747	43	0	3.45	.887	—	—	—	—	—	—	—	—
2022–23	Springfield Thunderbirds	AHL	3	1	2	0	177	7	1	2.38	.924	—	—	—	—	—	—	—	—
2023–24	Wilkes-Barre/Scranton Penguins	AHL	2	0	1	0	65	4	0	3.70	.862	—	—	—	—	—	—	—	—
2023–24	Wheeling Nailers	ECHL	5	0	3	1	241	16	0	4.00	.843	1	0	0	27	0	0	0.00	1.000
NHL totals			40	15	18	2	2,205	112	2	3.05	.899	—	—	—	—	—	—	—	—

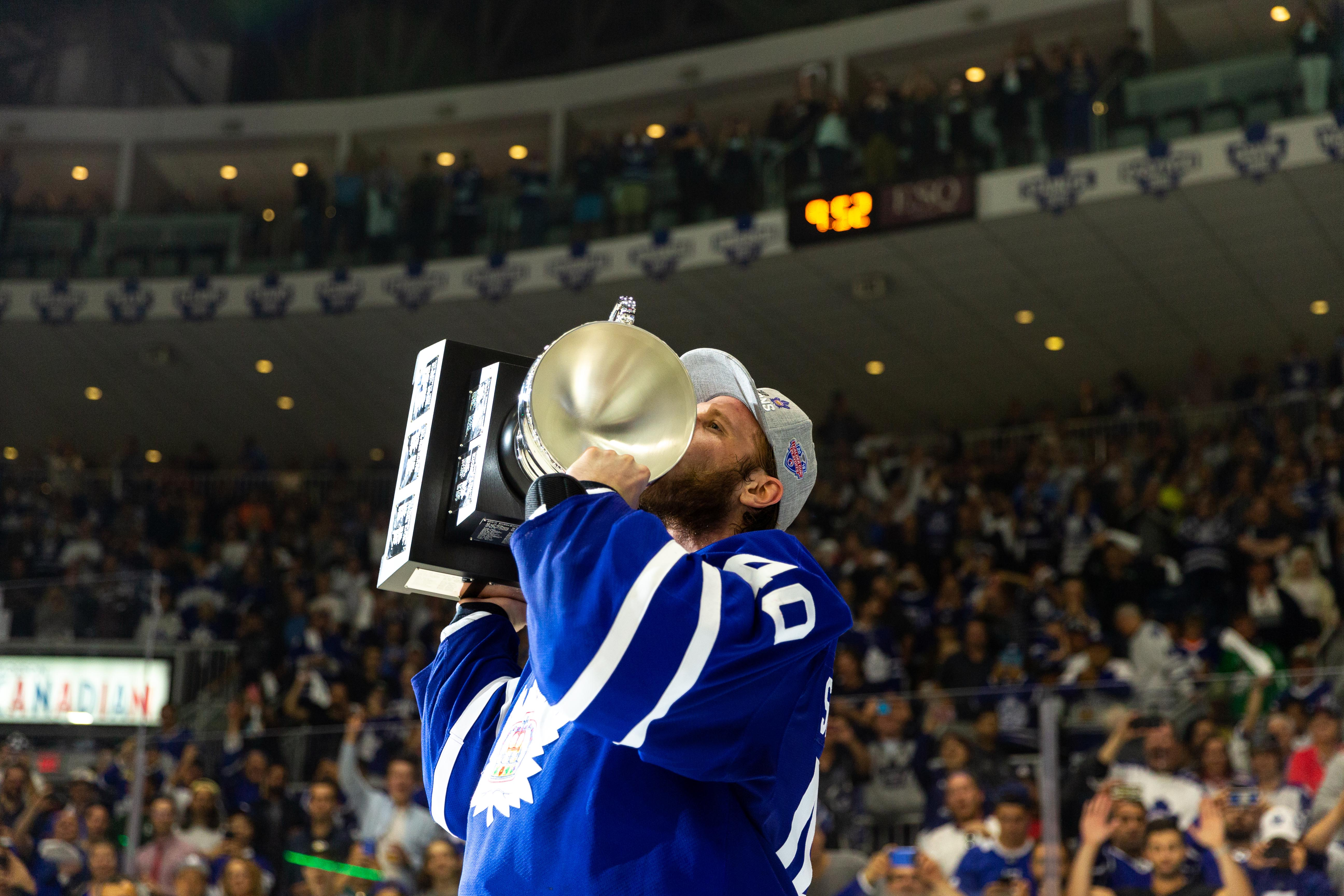
Sparks with the 2018 Calder Cup

== Awards and honors ==
Award	Year
AHL
Harry "Hap" Holmes Memorial Award	2018
Baz Bastien Memorial Award	2018
Calder Cup champion	2018

Awards and achievements
Preceded by Troy Grosenick	Aldege "Baz" Bastien Memorial Award; 2017–18	Succeeded by Alex Nedeljkovic
