= Connor Carrick =

American ice hockey player (born 1994)

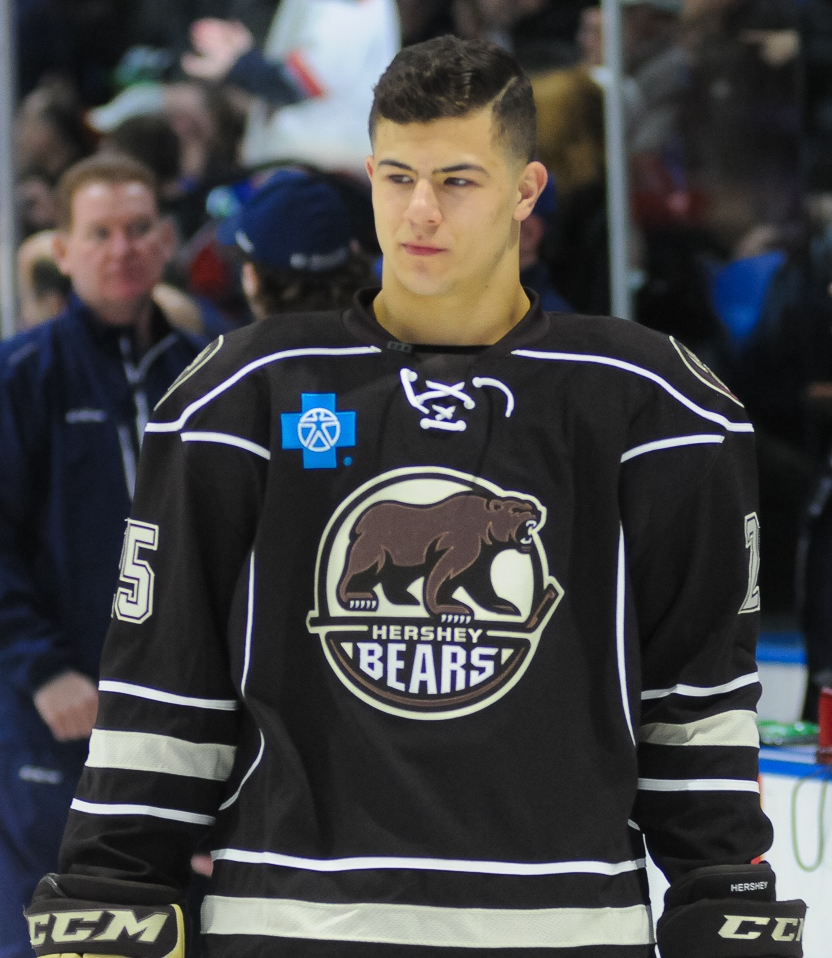
- Carrick with the Hershey Bears in 2015
- Born: April 13, 1994 (age 32) Orland Park, Illinois, U.S.
- Height: 5 ft 10 in (178 cm)
- Weight: 198 lb (90 kg; 14 st 2 lb)
- Position: Defense
- Shoots: Right
- NL team Former teams: Lugano HC; Washington Capitals; Toronto Maple Leafs; Dallas Stars; New Jersey Devils; Boston Bruins
- NHL draft: 137th overall, 2012; Washington Capitals
- Playing career: 2013–present

Connor Carrick (born April 13, 1994) is an American professional ice hockey defenseman who is currently playing with HC Lausanne in the National League (NL). He was selected by the Washington Capitals in the fifth round (137th overall) of the 2012 NHL entry draft.

== Playing career ==
=== Junior ===
Connor started playing AAA hockey in Chicago with the Chicago Fury, who subsequently retired his sweater number. He played there a season before getting drafted into the OHL by the Guelph Storm in the 11th round, 212th overall. For the next two years, Carrick played with the US National Team Development Program, competing with the U-17 team in the first year and the U-18 team in the second year. That year, during his second season with the US National Team Development Program, he was traded from the Guelph Storm (for whom he chose not to play) to the Plymouth Whalers in exchange for a sixth-round pick and a pair of third-round picks.

During the 2012 NHL entry draft, the Washington Capitals selected Carrick in the fifth round, 137th overall. He chose to play the 2012–13 season in the OHL, where he played 68 games with the Whalers, recording 12 goals and 32 assists for a total of 44 points, as well as 18 points in the playoffs, despite playing in only 15 games. He also led Plymouth in assists during the post-season with 16.

Carrick won a gold medal with Team USA at the 2013 IIHF World U18 Championship.

=== Professional ===
==== Washington Capitals ====
On September 23, 2013, the Capitals signed Carrick to a three-year, entry-level contract. On October 3, Carrick scored his first career NHL goal in a 5–4 win over the Calgary Flames. He split the season between the Capitals and their American Hockey League (AHL) affiliate, the Hershey Bears.

==== Toronto Maple Leafs ====
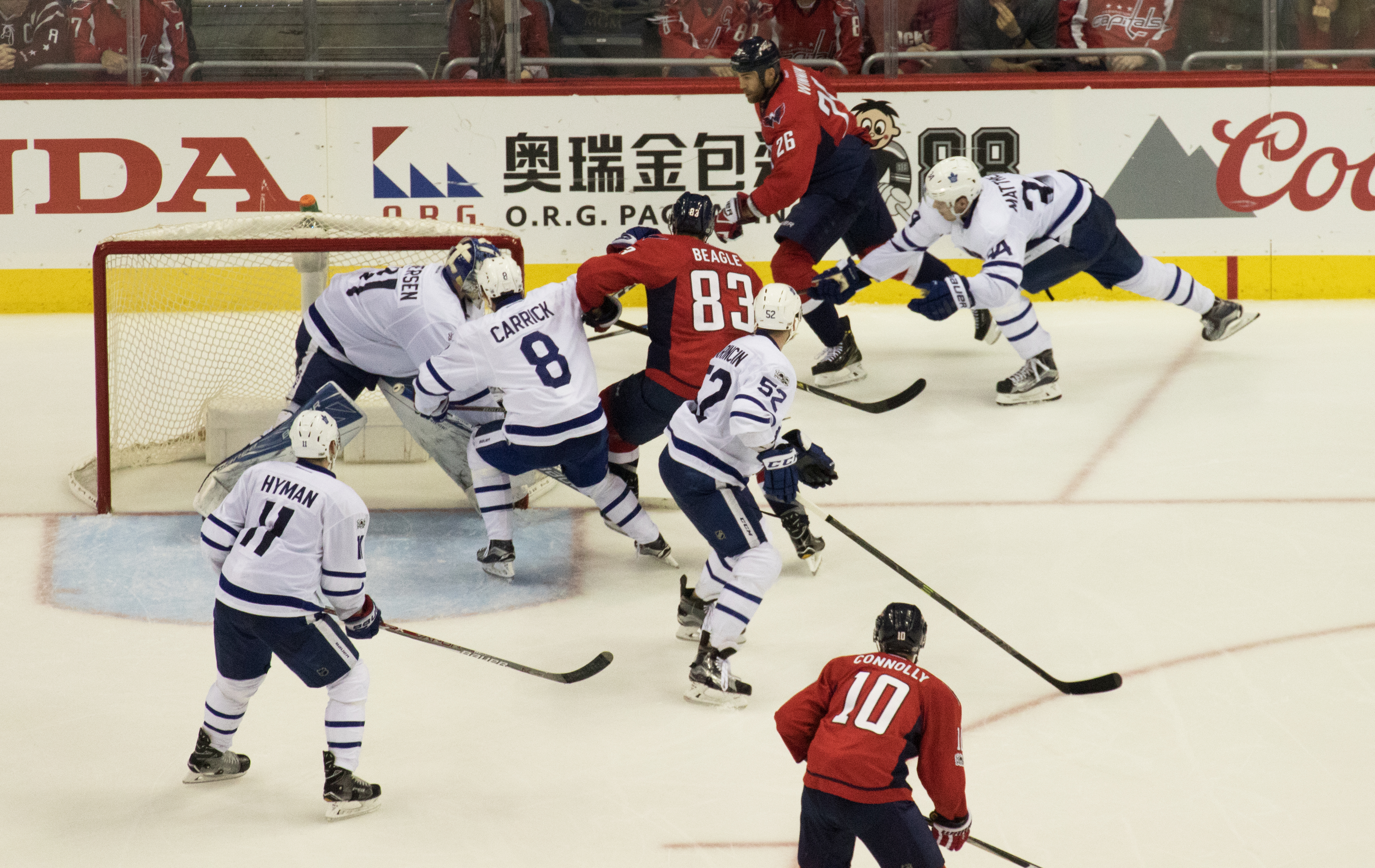
Carrick (#8) with the Toronto Maple Leafs during the 2017 Stanley Cup playoffs.

On February 28, 2016, Carrick, Brooks Laich and a 2016 second-round pick was traded to the Toronto Maple Leafs in exchange for Daniel Winnik and a 2016 fifth-round pick. He played in 16 games with the Maple Leafs to close out the season, recording four points. Carrick led the 2016 Calder Cup playoffs in scoring with 18 points in 15 games (including one five-point performance). However, he and the Maple Leafs' AHL affiliate, the Toronto Marlies, were eliminated in Eastern Conference Finals by the Bears.

On July 22, 2016, the Maple Leafs re-signed Carrick to a two-year contract extension. He joined the Maple Leafs full-time for the 2016-17 season, appearing in 67 games.

On June 20, 2018, Carrick signed a one-year, $1.3 million contract extension with the Maple Leafs.

==== Dallas Stars ====
On October 1, 2018, the Maple Leafs placed Carrick on waivers. Later that day, he was traded to the Dallas Stars in exchange for a 2019 conditional seventh-round pick, which could have been upgraded to a sixth (conditions for the upgrade were not met). In his debut for the Stars on October 4, he recorded two assists in a 3–0 win over the Arizona Coyotes. On October 28, Carrick was placed on injured reserve with a foot injury. He returned to the Stars' lineup on December 31 in a 3–2 loss to the Montreal Canadiens. On January 19, the Stars sent Carrick to their AHL affiliate, the Texas Stars on a conditioning loan. He skated in four games for Texas before returning to Dallas on January 27.

==== New Jersey Devils ====
On February 23, 2019, Carrick, along with a 2019 third-round pick, were traded to the New Jersey Devils in exchange for Ben Lovejoy. He skated in 20 games for the Devils to conclude the season.

On July 16, 2019, the Devils re-signed Carrick to a two-year, $3 million contract extension.

==== Seattle Kraken ====
On August 4, 2021, Carrick was signed as a free agent to a one-year, two-way $800K contract with an expansion club, the Seattle Kraken. After attending training camp, Carrick was reassigned to the Charlotte Checkers of the AHL.

==== Boston Bruins ====
As a free agent from the Kraken, Carrick joined the Boston Bruins organization, in signing a one-year, two-way contract on July 13, 2022. To rest key players for the playoffs, the Bruins called Carrick up to the NHL club. Carrick played one game for Boston before being sent back down, recording an assist in his lone game.

==== Return to Seattle ====
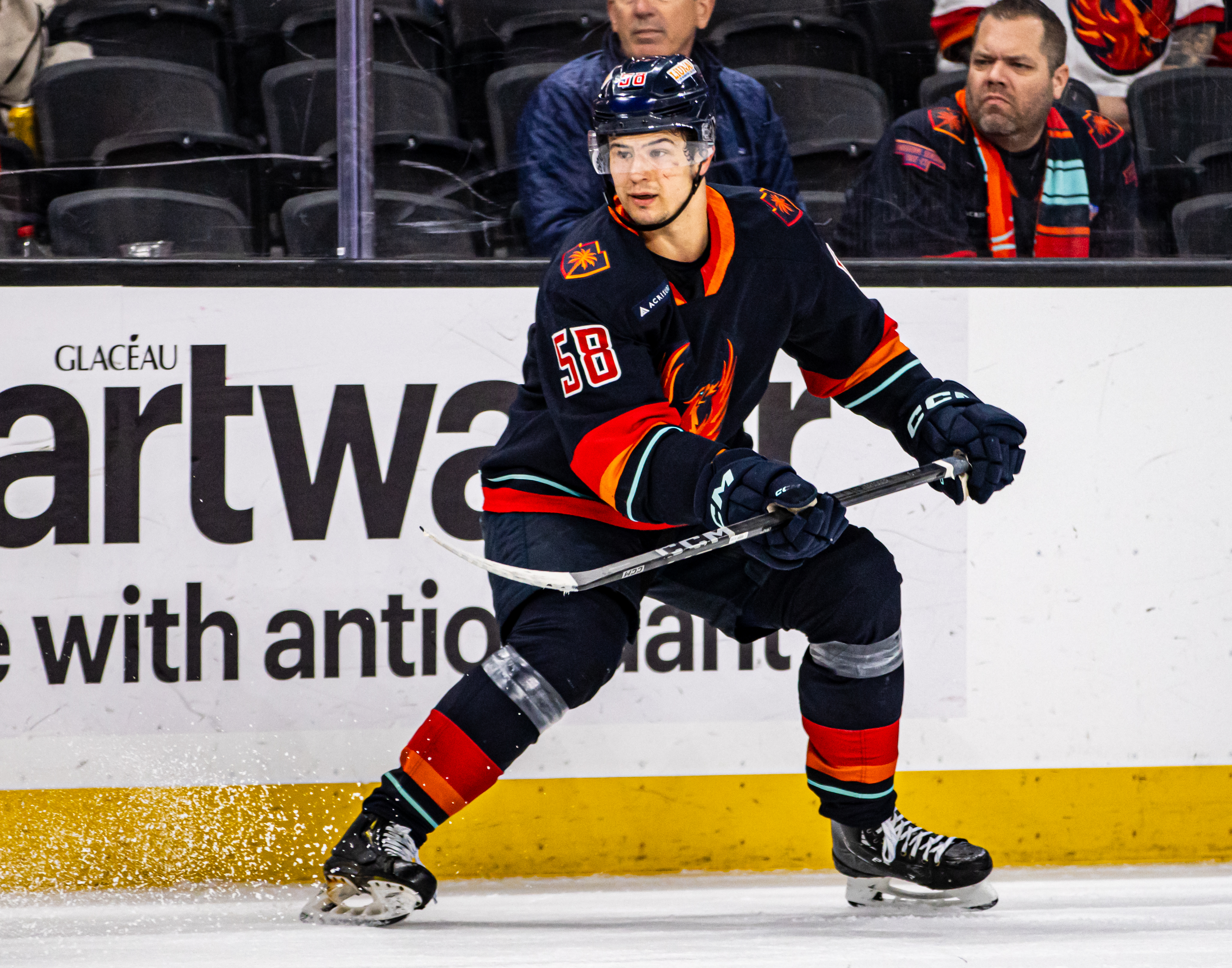
Carrick with the Coachella Valley Firebirds of the American Hockey League in 2024

After a lone season within the Bruins organization, Carrick returned to the Seattle Kraken in signing as a free agent to a one-year, two-way contract for the 2023–24 season on July 3, 2023.

==== Edmonton Oilers ====
As a free agent after his contract with the Kraken, Carrick joined his seventh NHL club in agreeing to a one-year, two-way contract with the Edmonton Oilers on July 1, 2024. He was assigned to the Bakersfield Condors to start the season, but with injuries to Mattias Ekholm, Jake Walman, Troy Stecher and John Klingberg as well as a suspension to Darnell Nurse, he was called up for the Oilers' season closer against the San Jose Sharks on April 16, 2025.

==== HC Lugano ====
As a free agent after his contract with the Oilers, Carrick signed a two-year contract on May 8, 2025, to play for HC Lugano of the National League in Switzerland.

== Personal life ==
Carrick has two brothers, Hunter and Blake, who also play hockey. Blake plays Division 3 hockey for Trinity College, while Hunter is committed to play at Penn State University.

In the summer of 2018, Carrick married his fiancée Lexi Solofra.

== Career statistics ==
=== Regular season and playoffs ===
			Regular season					Playoffs
Season	Team	League	GP	G	A	Pts	PIM	GP	G	A	Pts	PIM
2009–10	Chicago Fury 18U AAA	T1EHL	22	2	4	6	2	—	—	—	—	—
2010–11	U.S. NTDP Juniors	USHL	36	1	6	7	42	2	0	0	0	2
2010–11	U.S. NTDP U17	USDP	53	4	16	20	52	—	—	—	—	—
2011–12	U.S. NTDP Juniors	USHL	21	1	4	5	30	—	—	—	—	—
2011–12	U.S. NTDP U18	USDP	57	8	13	21	46	—	—	—	—	—
2012–13	Plymouth Whalers	OHL	68	12	32	44	79	15	2	16	18	6
2013–14	Washington Capitals	NHL	34	1	5	6	23	—	—	—	—	—
2013–14	Hershey Bears	AHL	13	0	4	4	15	—	—	—	—	—
2014–15	Hershey Bears	AHL	73	8	34	42	132	10	2	2	4	12
2015–16	Hershey Bears	AHL	46	10	15	25	50	—	—	—	—	—
2015–16	Washington Capitals	NHL	3	0	0	0	0	—	—	—	—	—
2015–16	Toronto Maple Leafs	NHL	16	2	2	4	15	—	—	—	—	—
2015–16	Toronto Marlies	AHL	5	1	2	3	2	15	7	11	18	12
2016–17	Toronto Maple Leafs	NHL	67	2	6	8	51	6	0	0	0	4
2017–18	Toronto Maple Leafs	NHL	47	4	8	12	27	—	—	—	—	—
2018–19	Dallas Stars	NHL	14	1	3	4	13	—	—	—	—	—
2018–19	Texas Stars	AHL	4	1	1	2	0	—	—	—	—	—
2018–19	New Jersey Devils	NHL	20	1	6	7	6	—	—	—	—	—
2019–20	New Jersey Devils	NHL	29	1	5	6	17	—	—	—	—	—
2019–20	Binghamton Devils	AHL	3	0	0	0	2	—	—	—	—	—
2020–21	New Jersey Devils	NHL	11	1	1	2	5	—	—	—	—	—
2020–21	Binghamton Devils	AHL	13	0	6	6	12	—	—	—	—	—
2021–22	Charlotte Checkers	AHL	59	10	22	32	67	7	0	4	4	6
2022–23	Providence Bruins	AHL	63	6	38	44	52	4	0	1	1	4
2022–23	Boston Bruins	NHL	1	0	1	1	0	—	—	—	—	—
2023–24	Coachella Valley Firebirds	AHL	70	9	25	34	66	18	1	6	7	8
2024–25	Bakersfield Condors	AHL	63	18	23	41	101	—	—	—	—	—
NHL totals			242	13	37	50	157	6	0	0	0	4

=== International ===
Year	Team	Event	Result	GP	G	A	Pts	PIM
2011	United States	U17	2nd place, silver medalist(s)	5	2	5	7	0
2012	United States	U18	1st place, gold medalist(s)	6	2	2	4	2
2013	United States	WJC	5th	5	0	3	3	4
Junior totals				16	4	10	14	6

== Awards and honors ==
Awards	Year
IIHF World U18 Championship Gold Medal with Team USA	2013
