= Carter Camper =

American professional ice hockey forward

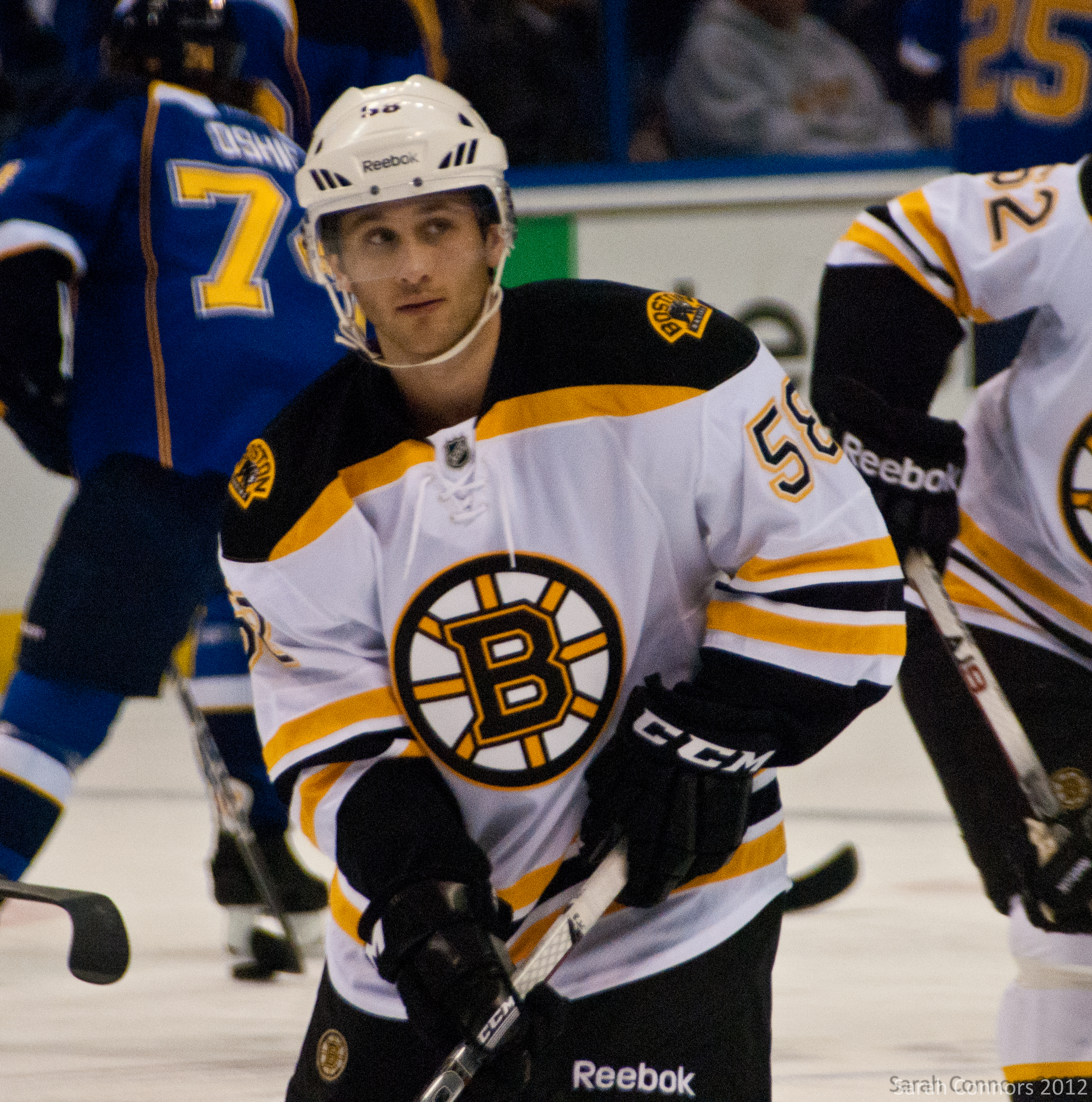
- Born: July 6, 1988 (age 38) Rocky River, Ohio, U.S.
- Height: 5 ft 9 in (175 cm)
- Weight: 173 lb (78 kg; 12 st 5 lb)
- Position: Right wing
- Shoots: Right
- HockeyAllsvenskan team Former teams: IK Oskarshamn; Tappara Tampere; Boston Bruins; Leksands IF
- NHL draft: Undrafted
- Playing career: 2011–present

Carter James Camper (born July 6, 1988) is an American professional ice hockey forward currently playing for IK Oskarshamn of the HockeyAllsvenskan. In 2010, after four seasons in the NCAA, Camper signed with the Boston Bruins of the National Hockey League (NHL). Since turning professional, he has played most of his professional career in the American Hockey League (AHL). In February 2014, Camper was traded to the Columbus Blue Jackets, and in July 2014, Camper joined the NHL Ottawa Senators organization as a free agent. In July 2015, he signed as a free agent with the Washington Capitals.

== Playing career ==
As a youth, Camper played in the 2002 Quebec International Pee-Wee Hockey Tournament with a minor ice hockey team from Cleveland.

=== College ===
Camper played four seasons of Division I NCAA hockey with the Miami RedHawks in the Central Collegiate Hockey Association.

He finished as the active career scoring leader in the United States. In the 2010–11 season, he was third in the US in assists, third in points per game, and fourth in points. In 156 career college games, he had 69 goals and 114 assists for 183 points. He placed second on the school's all-time list for points and career assists, and tied for seventh in career goals.

=== Professional ===
On April 7, 2011, following his graduation, Camper was signed as an undrafted free agent by the Boston Bruins. He was then immediately assigned to the Bruins top AHL affiliate, the Providence Bruins, where he made his professional debut the following night in a 5–4 win over the Portland Pirates.

On February 22, 2012, Camper made his NHL debut with the Bruins against the St. Louis Blues after being recalled from Providence on February 20, 2012. He logged a total of 6:21 time on ice. On February 25, 2012, Camper scored his first career NHL goal against Alex Auld of the Ottawa Senators in a 5-3 Boston win. It was assisted by Bruins defenseman Adam McQuaid. This was also his first NHL point. On February 27, 2012, Camper was sent back down to Providence along with two others as the result of two trades the Bruins made, acquiring three players.

On February 7, 2014, Camper was traded by the Bruins to the Columbus Blue Jackets in exchange for Blake Parlett and he joined the Springfield Falcons. Camper left the Blue Jackets organization as a free agent on July 2, 2014, when he signed a one-year two-way contract with the Ottawa Senators.

On July 1, 2015, Camper signed a one-year, two-way contract with the Washington Capitals.

As a free agent for a second consecutive season, Camper signed a one-year, two-way deal with the New Jersey Devils on July 1, 2016. He spent the duration of the 2016–17 season with AHL affiliate, the Albany Devils, compiling 29 assists for 35 points in 47 games.

Camper left the Devils as a free agent at the conclusion of his contract, signing a two-year AHL contract with hometown club, the Cleveland Monsters on July 21, 2017. In the 2017–18 season, Camper was leading the Monsters in scoring with 29 assists and 42 points in 53 games before he was traded to the Tucson Roadrunners, alongside an NHL transaction between parent affiliate's the Blue Jackets and the Arizona Coyotes on February 26, 2018. Camper found instant success with the Roadrunners, averaging at more than a point-per-game pace to play out the campaign.

On June 25, 2018, the Roadrunners traded Camper to the Grand Rapids Griffins in exchange for future considerations. On July 2, 2019, Camper agreed to continue his journeyman AHL career in signing a one-year contract with the Utica Comets, affiliate to the Vancouver Canucks.

After spending nine professional seasons in the AHL, Camper halted his North American career in accepting a two-year contract as a free agent with Swedish club, Leksands IF of the Swedish Hockey League (SHL) on August 7, 2020.

In his third season with Leksands in 2022–23, Camper contributed with 13 goals and 27 points in 41 games before leaving the club to join Swiss team, EV Zug of the NL, for the remainder of the campaign on February 8, 2023.

== Personal life ==
Camper, who was born in Rocky River, Ohio, is Jewish and is the middle son of Rick and Heidi Camper. His older brother Ben played college hockey at Colgate University before turning professional with the Tulsa Oilers of the Central Hockey League in 2008–09, and his brother Jay played junior hockey for the Alpena (Mich.) Ice Diggers of the North American Hockey League, the Lincoln Stars and Chicago Steel of the United States Hockey League, and now plays for the University of New Hampshire. The Camper boys are part of a few families from Northeast Ohio who had multiple children play college and professional hockey.

Carter attended Rocky River High School in Ohio.

Carter married Erika Fisher on August 25, 2012.

== Career statistics ==
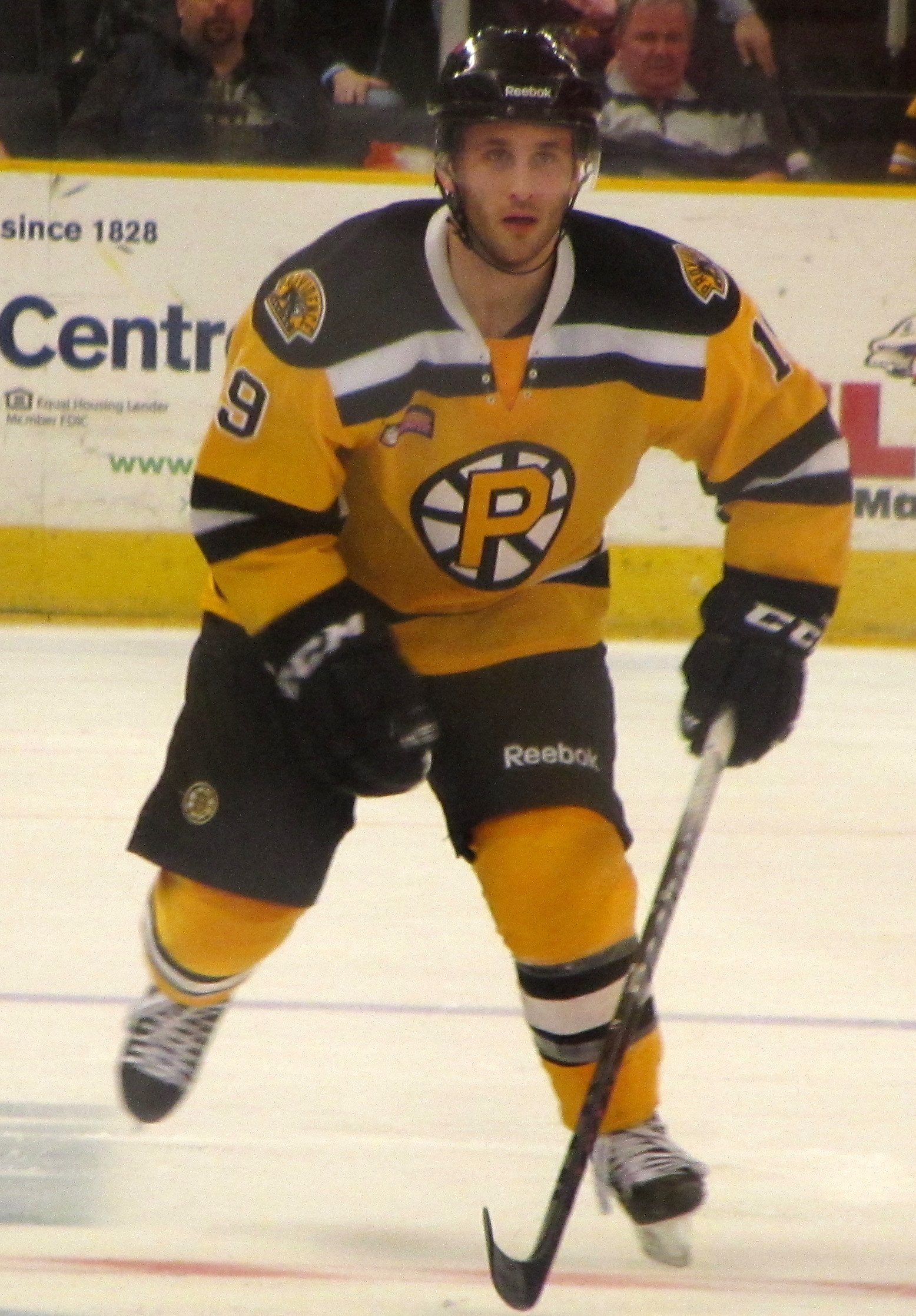
Camper during his tenure with the Providence Bruins.

			Regular season					Playoffs
Season	Team	League	GP	G	A	Pts	PIM	GP	G	A	Pts	PIM
2004–05	Cleveland Jr. Barons	NAHL	54	14	23	37	12	—	—	—	—	—
2005–06	Cleveland Jr. Barons	NAHL	57	31	51	82	26	14	6	15	21	4
2005–06	U.S. National Development Team	USDP	4	4	6	10	0	—	—	—	—	—
2006–07	Lincoln Stars	USHL	56	23	48	71	40	4	1	1	2	2
2007–08	Miami RedHawks	CCHA	33	15	26	41	20	—	—	—	—	—
2008–09	Miami RedHawks	CCHA	40	20	22	42	24	—	—	—	—	—
2009–10	Miami RedHawks	CCHA	44	15	28	43	14	—	—	—	—	—
2010–11	Miami RedHawks	CCHA	39	19	38	57	27	—	—	—	—	—
2010–11	Providence Bruins	AHL	3	1	1	2	2	—	—	—	—	—
2011–12	Providence Bruins	AHL	69	18	30	48	18	—	—	—	—	—
2011–12	Boston Bruins	NHL	3	1	0	1	0	—	—	—	—	—
2012–13	Providence Bruins	AHL	57	10	37	47	6	12	8	5	13	0
2013–14	Providence Bruins	AHL	41	8	23	31	16	—	—	—	—	—
2013–14	Springfield Falcons	AHL	19	4	16	20	8	5	1	4	5	0
2014–15	Binghamton Senators	AHL	75	15	37	52	16	—	—	—	—	—
2015–16	Hershey Bears	AHL	64	9	25	34	16	21	6	11	17	2
2016–17	Albany Devils	AHL	47	6	29	35	18	4	2	0	2	2
2017–18	Cleveland Monsters	AHL	53	13	29	42	10	—	—	—	—	—
2017–18	Tucson Roadrunners	AHL	15	3	16	19	4	9	1	7	8	6
2018–19	Grand Rapids Griffins	AHL	67	17	33	50	24	5	0	3	3	0
2019–20	Utica Comets	AHL	48	9	32	41	10	—	—	—	—	—
2020–21	Leksands IF	SHL	46	14	32	46	8	—	—	—	—	—
2021–22	Leksands IF	SHL	50	11	37	48	28	3	0	1	1	0
2022–23	Leksands IF	SHL	41	13	14	27	2	—	—	—	—	—
NHL totals			3	1	0	1	0	—	—	—	—	—
SHL totals			137	38	83	121	38	3	0	1	1	0

== Awards and honors ==
Award	Year
College
All-CCHA Rookie Team	2007–08
All-CCHA First Team	2008–09
AHCA West Second-Team All-American	2008–09
All-CCHA First Team	2010–11
AHCA West Second-Team All-American	2010–11

== See also ==
- List of select Jewish ice hockey players

Awards and achievements
Preceded by Dion Knelsen	CCHA Scholar-Athlete of the Year; 2010–11	Succeeded by Chad Billins
