= Nick Lappin =

American ice hockey player (born 1992)

- Born: November 1, 1992 (age 33) Geneva, Illinois, U.S.
- Height: 6 ft 1 in (185 cm)
- Weight: 175 lb (79 kg; 12 st 7 lb)
- Position: Right wing
- Shoots: Right
- ICEHL team Former teams: HC Bolzano; New Jersey Devils
- NHL draft: Undrafted
- Playing career: 2016–present

Nick J. Lappin (born November 1, 1992) is an American professional ice hockey right winger who currently plays for HC Bolzano of the ICE Hockey League (ICEHL). He formerly played for the New Jersey Devils in the National Hockey League (NHL). Lappin is the son of former NHL hockey player, Peter Lappin.

== Playing career ==
As a youth, Lappin played in the 2005 Quebec International Pee-Wee Hockey Tournament with the Chicago Mission minor ice hockey team.

Undrafted, Lappin played collegiate hockey with Brown University of the ECAC. Upon completing his senior year in the 2015–16 season, with 33 points in just 31 games, Lappin was signed by the New Jersey Devils to a two-year entry-level deal on March 9, 2016. He soon made his professional debut with the Devils AHL affiliate namesake, in Albany, appearing in 12 games for 7 points. In the post-season, Lappin continued his immediate contribution with 5 goals and 7 points in 11 games.

In his first full professional season in 2016–17, Lappin made his NHL debut for the Devils on October 28, 2016 against the Chicago Blackhawks. He recorded his first NHL point with an assist one night later against the Tampa Bay Lightning. On November 8, 2016, Lappin scored his first NHL goal in a 3–2 win against the Carolina Hurricanes.

On July 1, 2019, Lappin left the Devils organization after 5 seasons to sign as a free agent on a one-year, two-way contract with the St. Louis Blues for the 2019–20 campaign. Assigned to AHL affiliate, the San Antonio Rampage, for the duration of his contract with the Blues, Lappin produced just 5 goals and 11 points through 42 regular season games before the season was cancelled due to the COVID-19 pandemic.

As a free agent from the Blues and going un-signed leading into the pandemic delayed 2020–21 season, Lappin was signed to a one-year AHL contract with the Cleveland Monsters, affiliate of the Columbus Blue Jackets, on January 21, 2021.

Lappin remained a free agent with the 2021–22 season underway, before opting to sign a professional try-out contract with the Lehigh Valley Phantoms of the AHL, affiliate to the Philadelphia Flyers, on November 23, 2021.

Following the conclusion of his contract with the Phantoms, Lappin opted to halt his North American career in agreeing to a contract with Italian based club, HC Bolzano of the ICEHL, on July 22, 2022.

== Career statistics ==
			Regular season					Playoffs
Season	Team	League	GP	G	A	Pts	PIM	GP	G	A	Pts	PIM
2009–10	Cedar Rapids RoughRiders	USHL	35	4	4	8	46	3	0	0	0	2
2010–11	Cedar Rapids RoughRiders	USHL	1	0	0	0	0	—	—	—	—	—
2010–11	Tri-City Storm	USHL	48	9	17	26	26	—	—	—	—	—
2011–12	Tri-City Storm	USHL	53	27	19	46	14	2	1	1	2	2
2012–13	Brown University	ECAC	33	7	13	20	31	—	—	—	—	—
2013–14	Brown University	ECAC	30	13	19	32	2	—	—	—	—	—
2014–15	Brown University	ECAC	29	14	7	21	34	—	—	—	—	—
2015–16	Brown University	ECAC	31	17	16	33	12	—	—	—	—	—
2015–16	Albany Devils	AHL	12	3	4	7	19	11	5	2	7	2
2016–17	Albany Devils	AHL	35	14	15	29	14	4	0	1	1	2
2016–17	New Jersey Devils	NHL	43	4	3	7	17	—	—	—	—	—
2017–18	Binghamton Devils	AHL	65	31	22	53	37	—	—	—	—	—
2017–18	New Jersey Devils	NHL	6	1	0	1	4	—	—	—	—	—
2018–19	Binghamton Devils	AHL	56	19	15	34	25	—	—	—	—	—
2018–19	New Jersey Devils	NHL	11	0	0	0	0	—	—	—	—	—
2019–20	San Antonio Rampage	AHL	42	5	6	11	8	—	—	—	—	—
2020–21	Cleveland Monsters	AHL	11	1	1	2	2	—	—	—	—	—
2021–22	Lehigh Valley Phantoms	AHL	38	5	3	8	13	—	—	—	—	—
NHL totals			60	5	3	8	21	—	—	—	—	—
