= Justin Peters =

Canadian ice hockey player (born 1986)

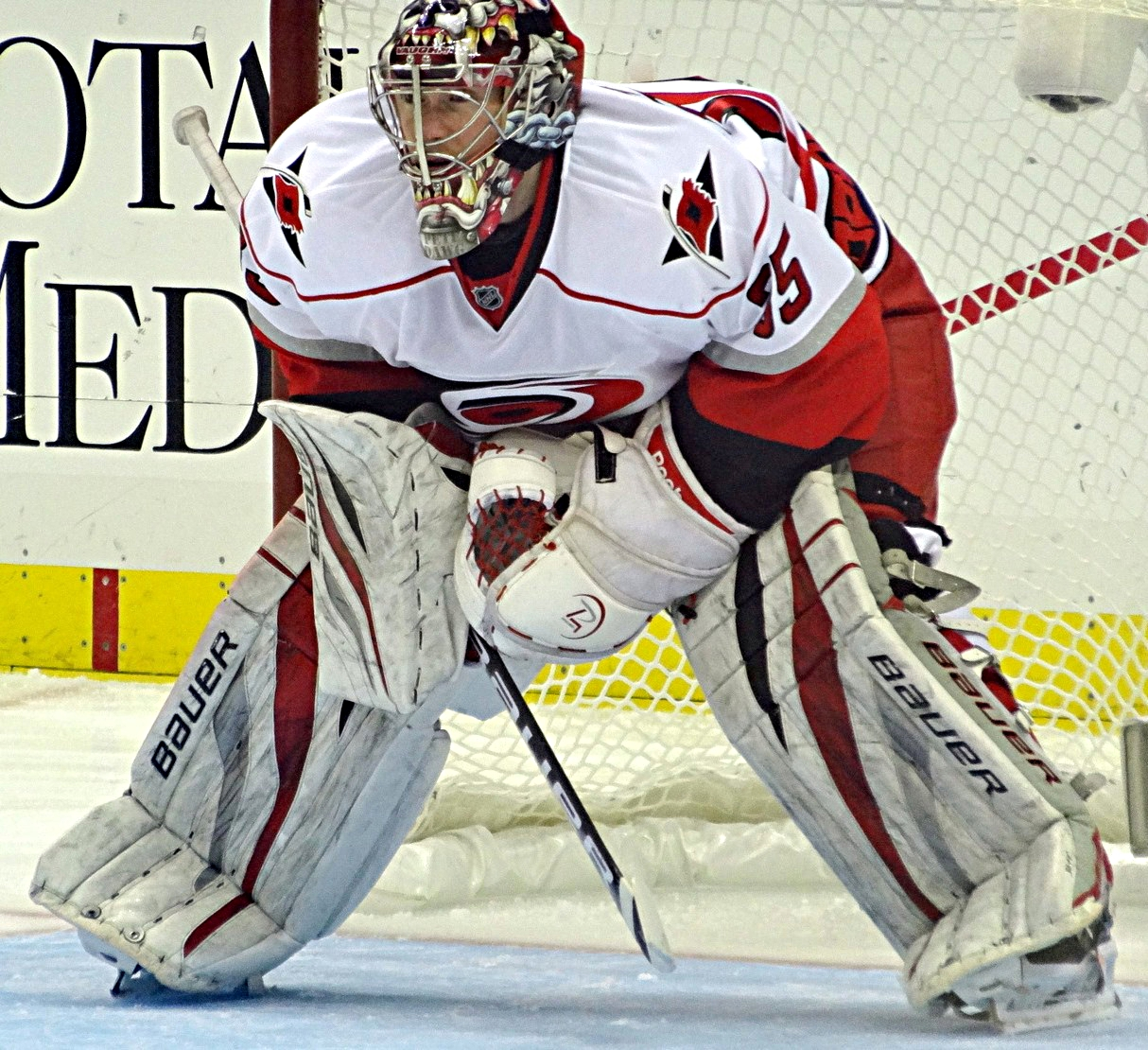
- Peters with the Carolina Hurricanes in 2013
- Born: August 30, 1986 (age 39) Blyth, Ontario, Canada
- Height: 6 ft 1 in (185 cm)
- Weight: 230 lb (104 kg; 16 st 6 lb)
- Position: Goaltender
- Caught: Left
- Played for: Carolina Hurricanes; Washington Capitals; Arizona Coyotes; Dinamo Riga; Kölner Haie; Piráti Chomutov; BK Mladá Boleslav; HC Bílí Tygři Liberec
- NHL draft: 38th overall, 2004; Carolina Hurricanes
- Playing career: 2006–2020

Justin Peters (born August 30, 1986) is a Canadian ice hockey coach and former professional ice hockey goaltender. He was selected in the second round, 38th overall, by the Carolina Hurricanes in the 2004 NHL entry draft. He is currently the goaltending coach for the Ottawa Senators of the National Hockey League.

Peters played 83 career games for the Hurricanes, Washington Capitals and Arizona Coyotes.

== Playing career ==
After playing Junior A hockey with the Vaughan Vipers of the Ontario Provincial Junior A Hockey League (OPJHL), Peters began a four-season Ontario Hockey League (OHL) career with the Toronto St. Michael's Majors and Plymouth Whalers. Peters scored an empty-net goal in Game 7 of the first-round of the 2004 OHL playoffs against the Sudbury Wolves while playing for the Majors. He was drafted in the second round, 38th overall, by the Carolina Hurricanes in the 2004 NHL entry draft, then began his professional career in 2006–07 with the Hurricanes' American Hockey League (AHL) affiliate, the Albany River Rats. He was demoted to the ECHL for parts of the 2007–08 season, but returned to the River Rats in 2008–09.

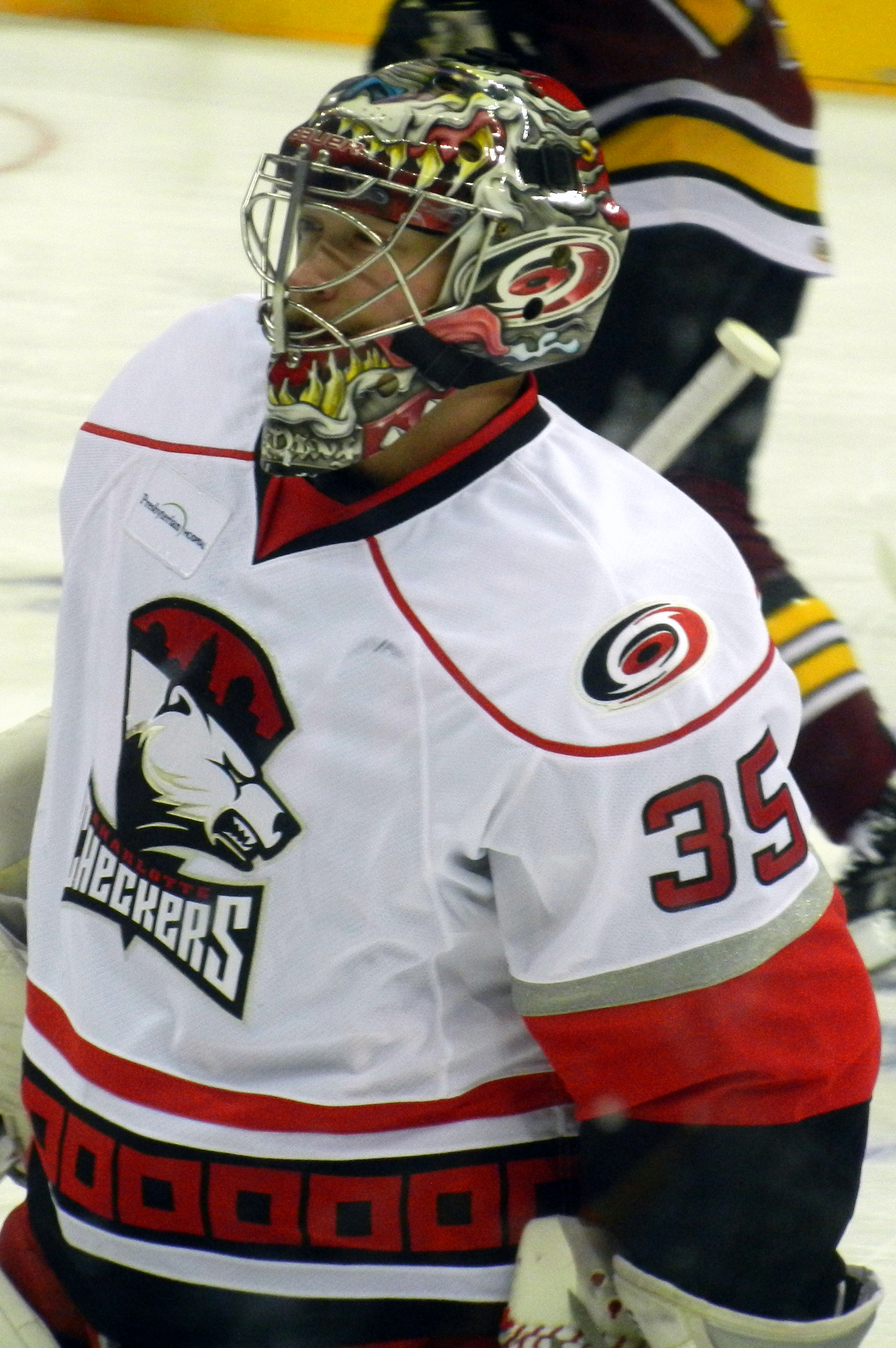
Peters with the Charlotte Checkers in 2012

On February 5, 2010, the Carolina Hurricanes recalled Justin Peters from Albany after Cam Ward suffered an upper body injury. He made his NHL debut for the Hurricanes on February 6, 2010, starting against the New York Islanders; he made 34 saves in a 3–1 victory.

After eight seasons within the Hurricanes organization, Peters left as a free agent to sign a two-year contract with the Washington Capitals on July 1, 2015.

On July 1, 2016, Peters left the Capitals as a free agent and signed a one-year contract with the Arizona Coyotes. He was assigned to begin the 2016–17 season with the Coyotes' AHL affiliate, the inaugural Tucson Roadrunners. With the Coyotes impacted by an injury to starting goaltender Mike Smith, Peters was recalled and appeared in three games. While returned to the Roadrunners, Peters (along with Justin Hache) were traded to the Dallas Stars in exchange for Brendan Ranford and Branden Troock on February 1, 2017.

Having spent his first ten professional seasons in North America, on June 30, 2017, Peters signed a one-year deal with Latvian club Dinamo Riga of the Kontinental Hockey League (KHL). On October 18, 2017, signed a contract with Deutsche Eishockey Liga (DEL) side Kölner Haie of Germany.

Peters moved to Piráti Chomutov of the Czech Extraliga for the 2018-19 season. He then played for Bili Tygri Liberec and BK Mlada Boleslav the following season.

== Post-playing career ==
On February 5, 2021, Peters was hired by the Belleville Senators as a goaltending coach, effectively ending his professional career.In January 2024, Peters was elevated to become the Ottawa Senators goaltending coach.

== International play ==
Medal record

Representing Canada

Ice hockey

Olympic Games
Bronze medal – third place	2018 Pyeongchang	

On May 4, 2014, Peters was added to Canada's roster for the 2014 World Championship. Assuming the role as the team's third goaltender, Peters did not dress in the tournament.

On January 11, 2018, Peters was named to Canada's men's hockey team delegation to the 2018 Winter Olympics in Pyeonchang, South Korea, where they won the bronze medal.

== Personal ==
Both of Peters' brothers play hockey. Anthony, a fellow goaltender, plays for Modo Hockey in HockeyAllsvenskan. Youngest brother Alexander was drafted by the Dallas Stars in the 2014 NHL entry draft and most recently played for Saint Mary's University.

== Career statistics ==
=== Regular season and playoffs ===
			Regular season										Playoffs
Season	Team	League	GP	W	L	T	OTL	MIN	GA	SO	GAA	SV%	GP	W	L	MIN	GA	SO	GAA	SV%
2001–02	Huron-Perth Lakers	OMHA	17	11	2	4	—	810	32	1	1.89	—	13	9	4	285	30	1	2.31	—
2002–03	Toronto St. Michael's Majors	OHL	23	6	11	1	—	1057	55	0	3.12	.905	7	1	0	126	4	0	1.90	9.49
2003–04	Toronto St. Michael's Majors	OHL	53	30	16	6	—	3149	139	4	2.65	.910	18	10	8	1109	37	4	2.00	.922
2004–05	Toronto St. Michael's Majors	OHL	58	23	20	8	—	3149	146	3	2.78	.911	10	4	4	524	25	0	2.86	.934
2005–06	Toronto St. Michael's Majors	OHL	20	10	6	—	3	1174	75	0	3.83	.893	—	—	—	—	—	—	—	—
2005–06	Plymouth Whalers	OHL	35	19	15	—	1	2073	95	1	2.75	.921	13	6	7	789	42	0	3.20	.901
2006–07	Albany River Rats	AHL	34	10	18	—	0	1765	96	1	3.26	.886	—	—	—	—	—	—	—	—
2006–07	Florida Everblades	ECHL	1	0	0	—	1	65	6	0	5.54	.786	—	—	—	—	—	—	—	—
2007–08	Albany River Rats	AHL	11	7	3	—	0	645	29	0	2.70	.904	—	—	—	—	—	—	—	—
2007–08	Florida Everblades	ECHL	31	18	10	—	2	1846	79	1	2.57	.922	—	—	—	—	—	—	—	—
2008–09	Albany River Rats	AHL	56	19	30	—	4	3178	153	4	2.89	.908	—	—	—	—	—	—	—	—
2009–10	Albany River Rats	AHL	45	26	18	—	2	2763	117	1	2.54	.917	8	4	4	509	29	0	3.42	.896
2009–10	Carolina Hurricanes	NHL	9	6	3	—	0	488	23	0	2.83	.905	—	—	—	—	—	—	—	—
2010–11	Carolina Hurricanes	NHL	12	3	5	—	1	648	43	0	3.98	.875	—	—	—	—	—	—	—	—
2011–12	Charlotte Checkers	AHL	28	10	13	—	2	1604	74	1	2.77	.908	—	—	—	—	—	—	—	—
2011–12	Carolina Hurricanes	NHL	7	2	3	—	2	387	16	1	2.48	.931	—	—	—	—	—	—	—	—
2012–13	Charlotte Checkers	AHL	37	22	12	—	1	2072	79	6	2.29	.921	—	—	—	—	—	—	—	—
2012–13	Carolina Hurricanes	NHL	19	4	11	—	1	954	55	1	3.46	.891	—	—	—	—	—	—	—	—
2013–14	Charlotte Checkers	AHL	6	4	1	—	1	364	13	0	2.14	.932	—	—	—	—	—	—	—	—
2013–14	Carolina Hurricanes	NHL	21	7	9	—	4	1225	51	1	2.50	.919	—	—	—	—	—	—	—	—
2014–15	Washington Capitals	NHL	12	3	6	—	1	647	35	0	3.25	.881	—	—	—	—	—	—	—	—
2014–15	Hershey Bears	AHL	2	1	1	—	0	119	3	1	1.51	.948	—	—	—	—	—	—	—	—
2015–16	Hershey Bears	AHL	37	17	8	—	12	2055	104	1	3.04	.896	20	11	9	1242	44	2	2.13	.922
2016–17	Tucson Roadrunners	AHL	12	5	6	—	0	590	41	0	4.17	.868	—	—	—	—	—	—	—	—
2016–17	Arizona Coyotes	NHL	3	0	1	—	0	133	7	0	3.16	.900	—	—	—	—	—	—	—	—
2016–17	Texas Stars	AHL	31	13	16	—	4	1760	91	2	3.10	.888	—	—	—	—	—	—	—	—
2017–18	Dinamo Riga	KHL	14	2	11	—	0	690	40	0	3.48	.869	—	—	—	—	—	—	—	—
2017–18	Kölner Haie	DEL	24	11	11	—	0	1294	63	1	2.92	.895	—	—	—	—	—	—	—	—
2018–19	Piráti Chomutov	CZE	35	13	22	—	0	2027	94	3	2.78	.906	—	—	—	—	—	—	—	—
2019–20	Bílí Tygři Liberec	CZE	12	8	3	—	0	669	39	1	3.50	.881	—	—	—	—	—	—	—	—
2019–20	BK Mladá Boleslav	CZE	11	7	4	—	0	575	19	2	1.98	.918	—	—	—	—	—	—	—	—
NHL totals			83	25	38	—	9	4483	230	3	3.08	.901	—	—	—	—	—	—	—	—
