= Carter Rowney =

Canadian ice hockey player (born 1989)

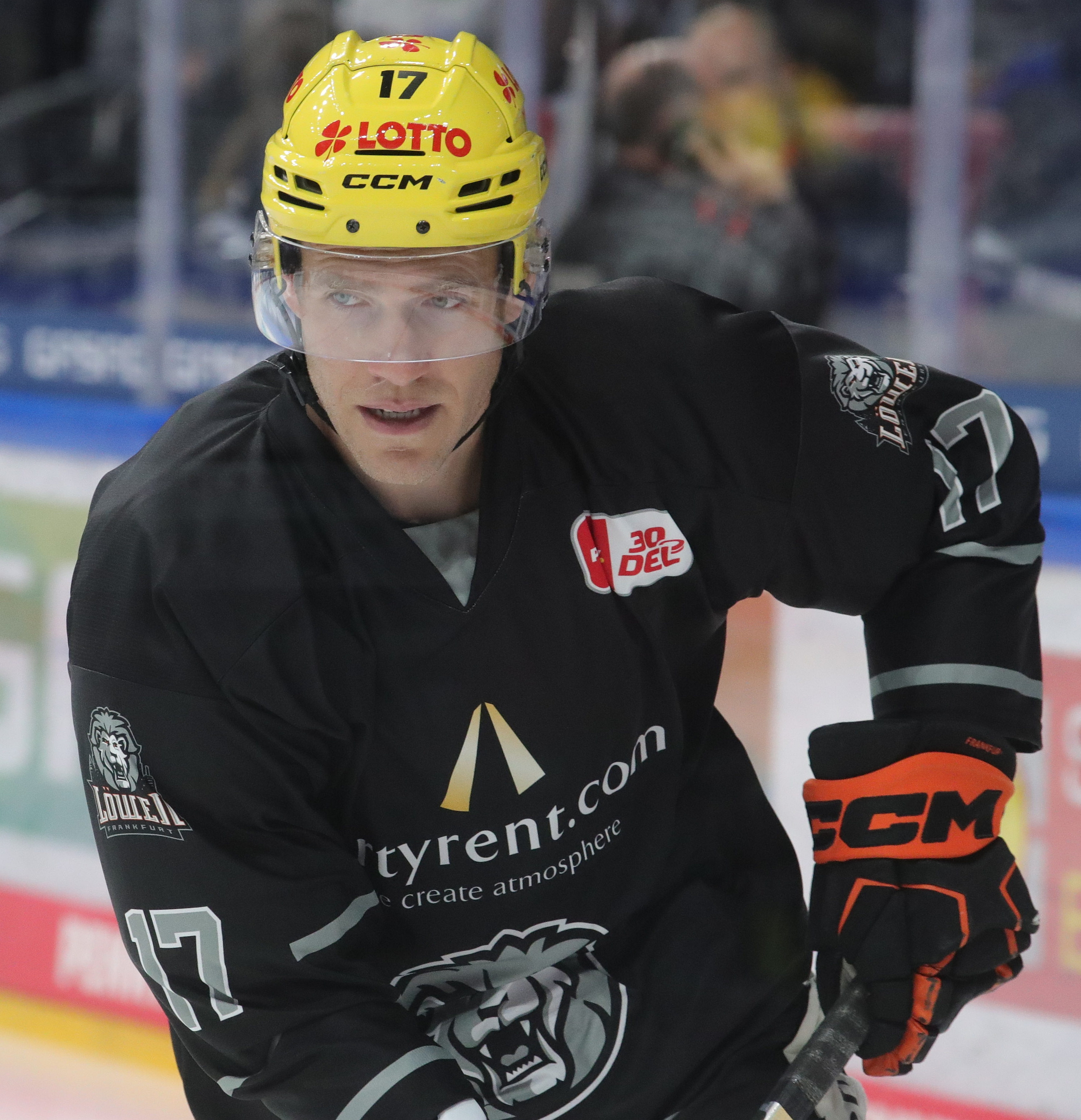
- Rowney with [Löwen Frankfurt]] in 2023
- Born: May 10, 1989 (age 37) Sexsmith, Alberta, Canada
- Height: 6 ft 2 in (188 cm)
- Weight: 208 lb (94 kg; 14 st 12 lb)
- Position: Forward
- Shoots: Right
- DEL team Former teams: Löwen Frankfurt; Pittsburgh Penguins; Anaheim Ducks; Detroit Red Wings
- NHL draft: Undrafted
- Playing career: 2013–present

Carter Rowney (born May 10, 1989) is a Canadian professional ice hockey forward under contract with Löwen Frankfurt of the Deutsche Eishockey Liga (DEL). He previously played in the National Hockey League (NHL) for the Pittsburgh Penguins, Anaheim Ducks, and Detroit Red Wings.

== Playing career ==
Rowney played junior hockey with the Grande Prairie Storm of the Alberta Junior Hockey League (AJHL). Having not been selected in any NHL entry draft, Rowney attended the University of North Dakota in Grand Forks, where he majored in managerial finance. He played collegiate hockey for North Dakota's ice hockey team in the Western Collegiate Hockey Association (WCHA) from 2009 to 2013. In 2010–11 and 2011–12, Rowney was named to the All-WCHA Academic Team. On September 18, 2012, North Dakota suspended Rowney (along with teammates Andrew MacWilliam, Corban Knight, and Danny Kristo) for the opening game of the 2012–13 season because of a violation of team rules which occurred during a team party.

On April 9, 2013, Rowney signed an amateur tryout agreement with the Abbotsford Heat of the American Hockey League (AHL). On October 3, 2013, Rowney signed an AHL contract with the Wilkes-Barre/Scranton Penguins. He re-signed with Wilkes-Barre/Scranton on July 24, 2014, on another one-year AHL contract. On March 9, 2016, after three seasons playing with Wilkes-Barre/Scranton and the Wheeling Nailers of the ECHL, Rowney signed his first NHL contract, a two-year, two-way contract with the Pittsburgh Penguins worth an average annual value of $612,500. He was named the AHL Player of the Month for March 2016, recording 17 points in 12 games for Wilkes-Barre/Scranton.

Rowney made his NHL debut on January 31, 2017, in Pittsburgh's game against the Nashville Predators. On February 4, he recorded his first NHL point, assisting on a Kris Letang goal against the St. Louis Blues. On March 17, 2017, Rowney scored his first NHL goal, against New Jersey Devils goaltender Keith Kinkaid in a 6–4 Penguins win. On June 11, 2017, after a 2–0 shutout victory over the Nashville Predators, Rowney won his first Stanley Cup with the Penguins. In the 2017–18 season, he was injured on October 21, 2017, suffering a broken hand after blocking a shot against the Tampa Bay Lightning. He returned to the line-up on November 24 after missing 14 games. He was injured again on January 2, suffering an upper-body injury during a game against the Philadelphia Flyers. He returned to game action on February 2, missing 11 games.

After five seasons with the Penguins organization, on July 2, 2018, Rowney left as a free agent to sign a three-year contract with the Anaheim Ducks. In his first two seasons with the Ducks, Rowney recorded his most productive seasons at the NHL level, recording a career high 20 points in the 2018–19 season, followed by 19 points in the 2019–20 campaign. Entering the final year of his contract with the Ducks, Rowney was limited by injury to just 19 games in the shortened 2020–21 season, recording 6 assists. As a free agent from the Ducks who were rebuilding, he was signed to a one-year, $825,000 contract with the Detroit Red Wings on September 2, 2021.

After six seasons in the NHL, Rowney having concluded his contract with the Red Wings, opted to continue his professional career abroad, signing a one-year contract with German club, Löwen Frankfurt of the DEL, on September 12, 2022.

== Personal life ==
In August 2016, Rowney and Danielle Luetzen married. She is a former volleyball player at the University of North Dakota.

Their first child, Anders, was born on May 14, 2017.

== Career statistics ==
| | | | Regular season | | | | | Playoffs |
| Season | Team | League | GP | G | A | Pts | PIM | GP | G | A | Pts | PIM |
|---|---|---|---|---|---|---|---|---|---|---|---|---|
| 2005–06 | Grande Prairie Storm | AJHL | 1 | 0 | 1 | 1 | 0 | — | — | — | — | — |
| 2006–07 | Grande Prairie Storm | AJHL | 42 | 7 | 12 | 19 | 28 | 6 | 0 | 0 | 0 | 2 |
| 2007–08 | Grande Prairie Storm | AJHL | 52 | 16 | 15 | 31 | 47 | — | — | — | — | — |
| 2008–09 | Grande Prairie Storm | AJHL | 62 | 35 | 43 | 78 | 71 | 19 | 12 | 6 | 18 | 10 |
| 2009–10 | U. of North Dakota | WCHA | 39 | 1 | 7 | 8 | 23 | — | — | — | — | — |
| 2010–11 | U. of North Dakota | WCHA | 28 | 3 | 2 | 5 | 14 | — | — | — | — | — |
| 2011–12 | U. of North Dakota | WCHA | 42 | 18 | 15 | 33 | 18 | — | — | — | — | — |
| 2012–13 | U. of North Dakota | WCHA | 41 | 10 | 17 | 27 | 10 | — | — | — | — | — |
| 2012–13 | Abbotsford Heat | AHL | 4 | 1 | 0 | 1 | 0 | — | — | — | — | — |
| 2013–14 | Wheeling Nailers | ECHL | 39 | 13 | 31 | 44 | 19 | — | — | — | — | — |
| 2013–14 | Wilkes-Barre/Scranton Penguins | AHL | 24 | 2 | 2 | 4 | 6 | 7 | 0 | 2 | 2 | 2 |
| 2014–15 | Wheeling Nailers | ECHL | 5 | 1 | 6 | 7 | 2 | — | — | — | — | — |
| 2014–15 | Wilkes-Barre/Scranton Penguins | AHL | 63 | 10 | 21 | 31 | 31 | 8 | 2 | 2 | 4 | 4 |
| 2015–16 | Wilkes-Barre/Scranton Penguins | AHL | 74 | 24 | 32 | 56 | 37 | 10 | 4 | 8 | 12 | 6 |
| 2016–17 | Wilkes-Barre/Scranton Penguins | AHL | 26 | 10 | 11 | 21 | 15 | — | — | — | — | — |
| 2016–17 | Pittsburgh Penguins | NHL | 27 | 3 | 4 | 7 | 4 | 20 | 0 | 3 | 3 | 4 |
| 2017–18 | Pittsburgh Penguins | NHL | 44 | 2 | 3 | 5 | 4 | 3 | 0 | 0 | 0 | 0 |
| 2018–19 | Anaheim Ducks | NHL | 62 | 7 | 13 | 20 | 12 | — | — | — | — | — |
| 2019–20 | Anaheim Ducks | NHL | 71 | 8 | 11 | 19 | 14 | — | — | — | — | — |
| 2020–21 | Anaheim Ducks | NHL | 19 | 0 | 6 | 6 | 2 | — | — | — | — | — |
| 2021–22 | Detroit Red Wings | NHL | 26 | 4 | 2 | 6 | 0 | — | — | — | — | — |
| 2022–23 | Löwen Frankfurt | DEL | 55 | 21 | 37 | 58 | 14 | 2 | 0 | 0 | 0 | 0 |
| 2023–24 | Löwen Frankfurt | DEL | 52 | 14 | 16 | 30 | 12 | — | — | — | — | — |
| 2024–25 | Löwen Frankfurt | DEL | 42 | 15 | 16 | 31 | 12 | 2 | 0 | 0 | 0 | 0 |
| NHL totals | | | 249 | 24 | 39 | 63 | 36 | 23 | 0 | 3 | 3 | 4 |

== Awards and honours ==
| Award | Year |
AJHL
| North All-Star Team | 2009 |
| Playoff MVP | 2009 |
College
| All-Academic Team | 2011, 2012 |
NHL
| Stanley Cup champion | 2017 |

Awards and achievements
| Preceded by Mike Sislo | AHL Player of the Month; March 2016 | Succeeded by Brendan Leipsic |
