= Liam O'Brien (ice hockey) =

Canadian ice hockey player (born 1994)

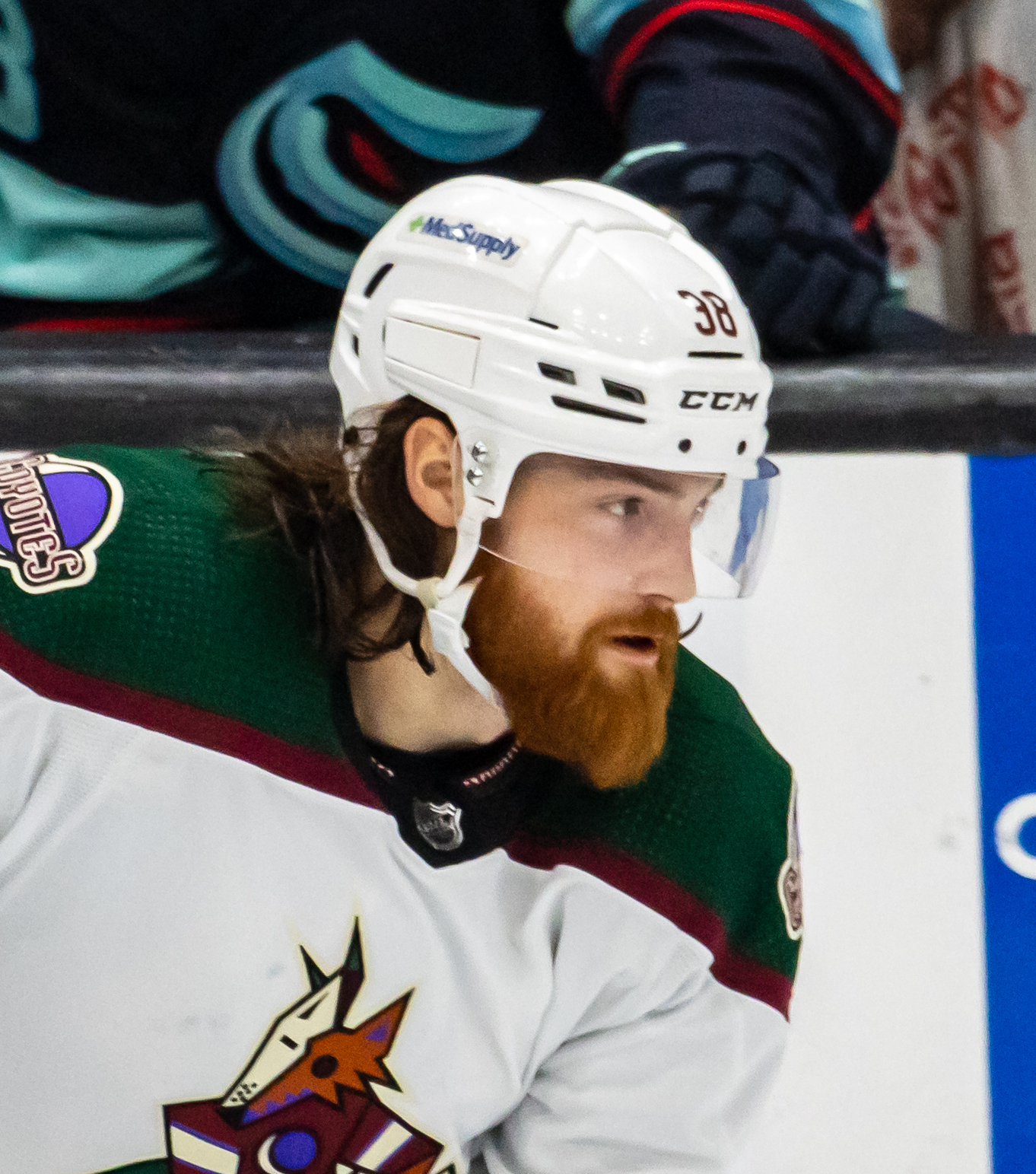
- O'Brien with the Arizona Coyotes in 2023
- Born: July 29, 1994 (age 31) Halifax, Nova Scotia, Canada
- Height: 6 ft 1 in (185 cm)
- Weight: 205 lb (93 kg; 14 st 9 lb)
- Position: Forward
- Shoots: Left
- NHL team Former teams: Utah Mammoth; Washington Capitals; Colorado Avalanche; Arizona Coyotes
- NHL draft: Undrafted
- Playing career: 2014–present

Liam O'Brien (born July 29, 1994) is a Canadian professional ice hockey player who is a forward for the Utah Mammoth of the National Hockey League (NHL). Nicknamed "Spicy Tuna" by Utah fans, O'Brien is mostly known as an enforcer.

== Playing career ==
O'Brien was drafted in the first round, 10th overall, by the Rimouski Océanic in the 2010 Quebec Major Junior Hockey League (QMJHL) draft. He scored his first QMJHL goal in his second game, against the Lewiston Maineiacs. He played for the Océanic until 2011, when he was traded to the Rouyn-Noranda Huskies for draft picks.

Passed over in the NHL entry draft, O'Brien received a training camp invite from the Washington Capitals in 2014, and made the team, signing a three-year, entry-level contract on October 6, 2014. He made his NHL debut on October 9, in a game against the Montreal Canadiens, in which he registered his first NHL fight against the Canadiens' Brandon Prust.

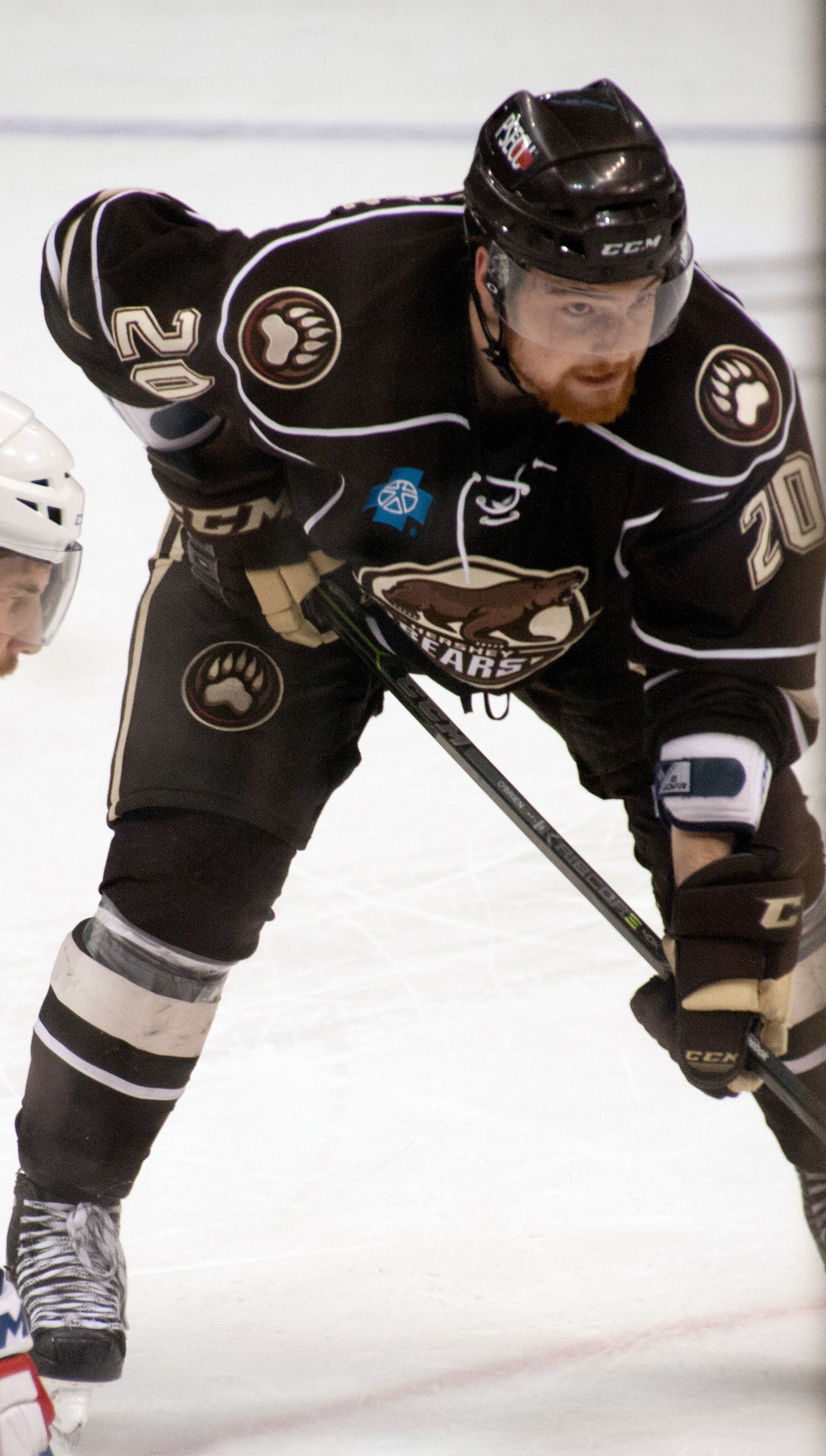
O'Brien with the Bears in 2015

On June 10, 2019, O'Brien agreed to return for his sixth season within the Capitals organization, agreeing to a one-year, two-way contract extension. O'Brien was waived by the Washington Capitals on September 30, and loaned to the Hershey Bears of the American Hockey League (AHL) the following day.

On the completion of his sixth year with the Bears, O'Brien left the Capitals organization as a free agent. With the COVID-19 pandemic delaying the following North American season, O'Brien was belatedly signed to an AHL contract with the Colorado Eagles, primary affiliate to the Colorado Avalanche, on November 27, 2020. In the 2020–21 season, O'Brien immediately contributed with the Eagles, adding eight points through 12 games, before signing a one-year NHL contract with the Avalanche for the remainder of the campaign on March 30, 2021.

He made his debut for the Avalanche, appearing in his first NHL contest in over three years, in a 4–2 victory over the St. Louis Blues on April 2. He recorded his first multi-point game with a career-high two assists in a 4–3 victory over the Blues on April 14. Adding physicality in a fourth-line role for Colorado, O'Brien finished with three assists and 40 penalty minutes through 12 regular season games.

As a free agent, O'Brien signed a one-year, two-way contract with the Arizona Coyotes on July 28, 2021. On October 25, O'Brien scored his first NHL goal since the 2014–15 season when he beat Spencer Knight in a 5–3 loss to the Florida Panthers. In his first season with the Coyotes, he established new career highs in games played in the NHL, goals, points, penalty minutes and shots. On March 6, 2022, O'Brien signed a two-year contract extension with the Coyotes.

Shortly after the end of the 2023–24 regular season, the Coyotes' franchise was suspended and team assets were subsequently transferred to the expansion Utah Hockey Club; as a result, O'Brien became a member of the Utah team. Shortly before free agency, he signed a three-year contract extension worth $1 million annual to remain with Utah.

== International play ==
As a 16 year old, O'Brien was selected to compete at the 2011 World U-17 Hockey Challenge.

== Career statistics ==
=== Regular season and playoffs ===
Bold indicates led league

| | | | Regular season | | | | | Playoffs |
| Season | Team | League | GP | G | A | Pts | PIM | GP | G | A | Pts | PIM |
|---|---|---|---|---|---|---|---|---|---|---|---|---|
| 2009–10 | Notre Dame Hounds | SMHL | 41 | 13 | 25 | 38 | 98 | 13 | 4 | 3 | 7 | 30 |
| 2010–11 | Rimouski Océanic | QMJHL | 61 | 2 | 8 | 10 | 45 | 5 | 0 | 0 | 0 | 6 |
| 2011–12 | Rimouski Océanic | QMJHL | 40 | 7 | 9 | 16 | 67 | — | — | — | — | — |
| 2011–12 | Rouyn-Noranda Huskies | QMJHL | 27 | 3 | 7 | 10 | 69 | 4 | 1 | 0 | 1 | 11 |
| 2012–13 | Rouyn-Noranda Huskies | QMJHL | 65 | 10 | 14 | 24 | 164 | 12 | 2 | 1 | 3 | 17 |
| 2013–14 | Rouyn-Noranda Huskies | QMJHL | 68 | 20 | 15 | 35 | 148 | 9 | 1 | 3 | 4 | 12 |
| 2014–15 | Washington Capitals | NHL | 13 | 1 | 1 | 2 | 23 | — | — | — | — | — |
| 2014–15 | Hershey Bears | AHL | 45 | 4 | 4 | 8 | 121 | 10 | 3 | 3 | 6 | 14 |
| 2015–16 | Hershey Bears | AHL | 59 | 7 | 9 | 16 | 120 | 20 | 4 | 2 | 6 | 65 |
| 2016–17 | Hershey Bears | AHL | 64 | 10 | 20 | 30 | 117 | 6 | 0 | 0 | 0 | 13 |
| 2016–17 | Washington Capitals | NHL | 1 | 0 | 0 | 0 | 0 | — | — | — | — | — |
| 2017–18 | Hershey Bears | AHL | 69 | 17 | 9 | 26 | 79 | — | — | — | — | — |
| 2017–18 | Washington Capitals | NHL | 3 | 0 | 0 | 0 | 5 | — | — | — | — | — |
| 2018–19 | Hershey Bears | AHL | 74 | 15 | 13 | 28 | 118 | 8 | 1 | 0 | 1 | 21 |
| 2019–20 | Hershey Bears | AHL | 59 | 10 | 19 | 29 | 83 | — | — | — | — | — |
| 2020–21 | Colorado Eagles | AHL | 12 | 4 | 4 | 8 | 15 | — | — | — | — | — |
| 2020–21 | Colorado Avalanche | NHL | 12 | 0 | 3 | 3 | 40 | — | — | — | — | — |
| 2021–22 | Arizona Coyotes | NHL | 39 | 2 | 1 | 3 | 106 | — | — | — | — | — |
| 2022–23 | Arizona Coyotes | NHL | 56 | 3 | 8 | 11 | 114 | — | — | — | — | — |
| 2023–24 | Arizona Coyotes | NHL | 75 | 5 | 9 | 14 | **153** | — | — | — | — | — |
| 2024–25 | Utah Hockey Club | NHL | 28 | 0 | 2 | 2 | 50 | — | — | — | — | — |
| 2025–26 | Utah Mammoth | NHL | 38 | 3 | 1 | 4 | 43 | — | — | — | — | — |
| NHL totals | | | 265 | 14 | 25 | 39 | 534 | — | — | — | — | — |

=== International ===
| Year | Team | Event | Result | GP | G | A | Pts | PIM |
|---|---|---|---|---|---|---|---|---|
| 2011 | Canada Atlantic | U17 | 5th | 5 | 1 | 1 | 2 | 8 |
| Junior totals | | | | 5 | 1 | 1 | 2 | 8 |
