= Sports in the San Francisco Bay Area =

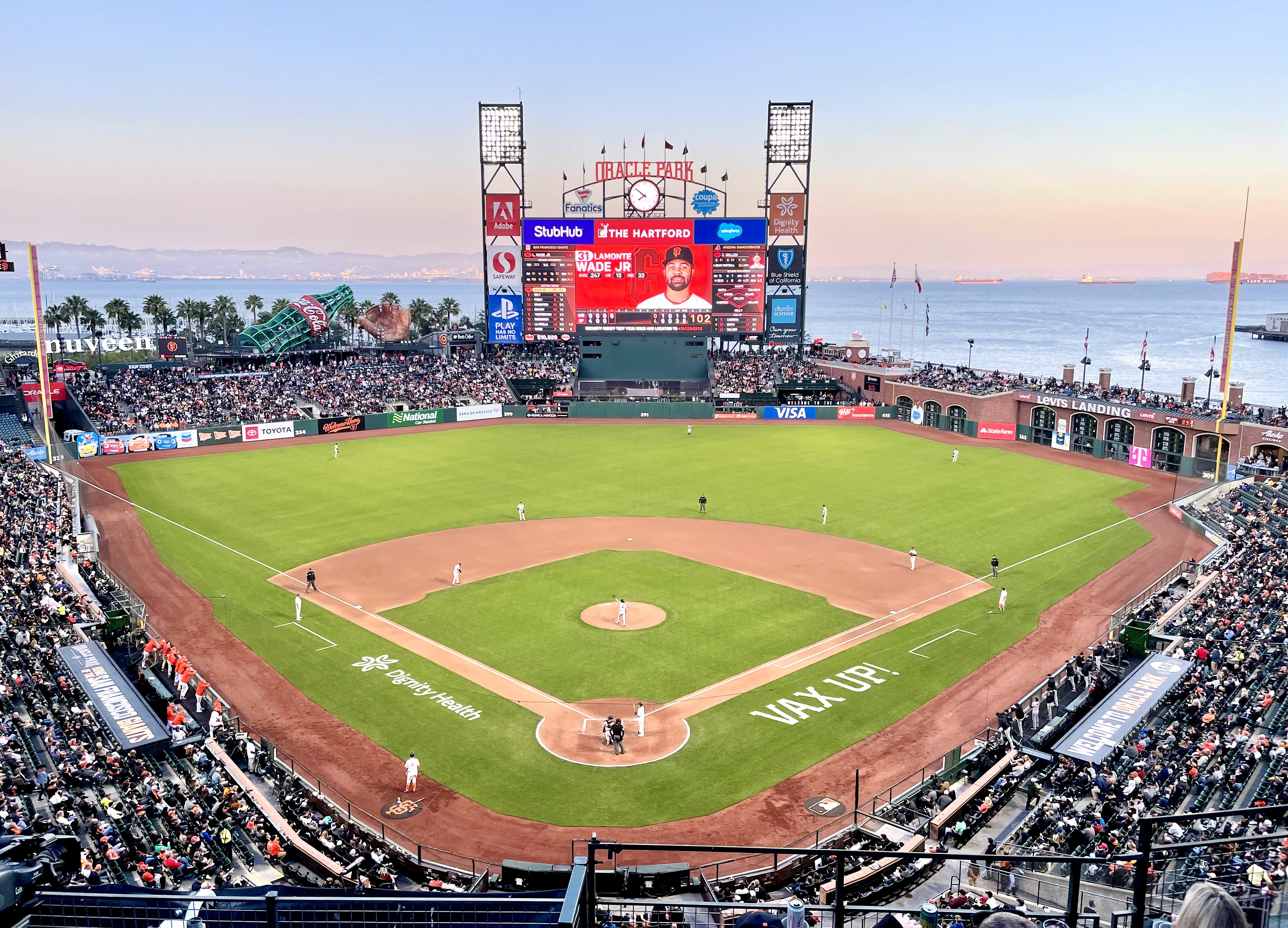
Oracle Park, home of the San Francisco Giants (MLB)

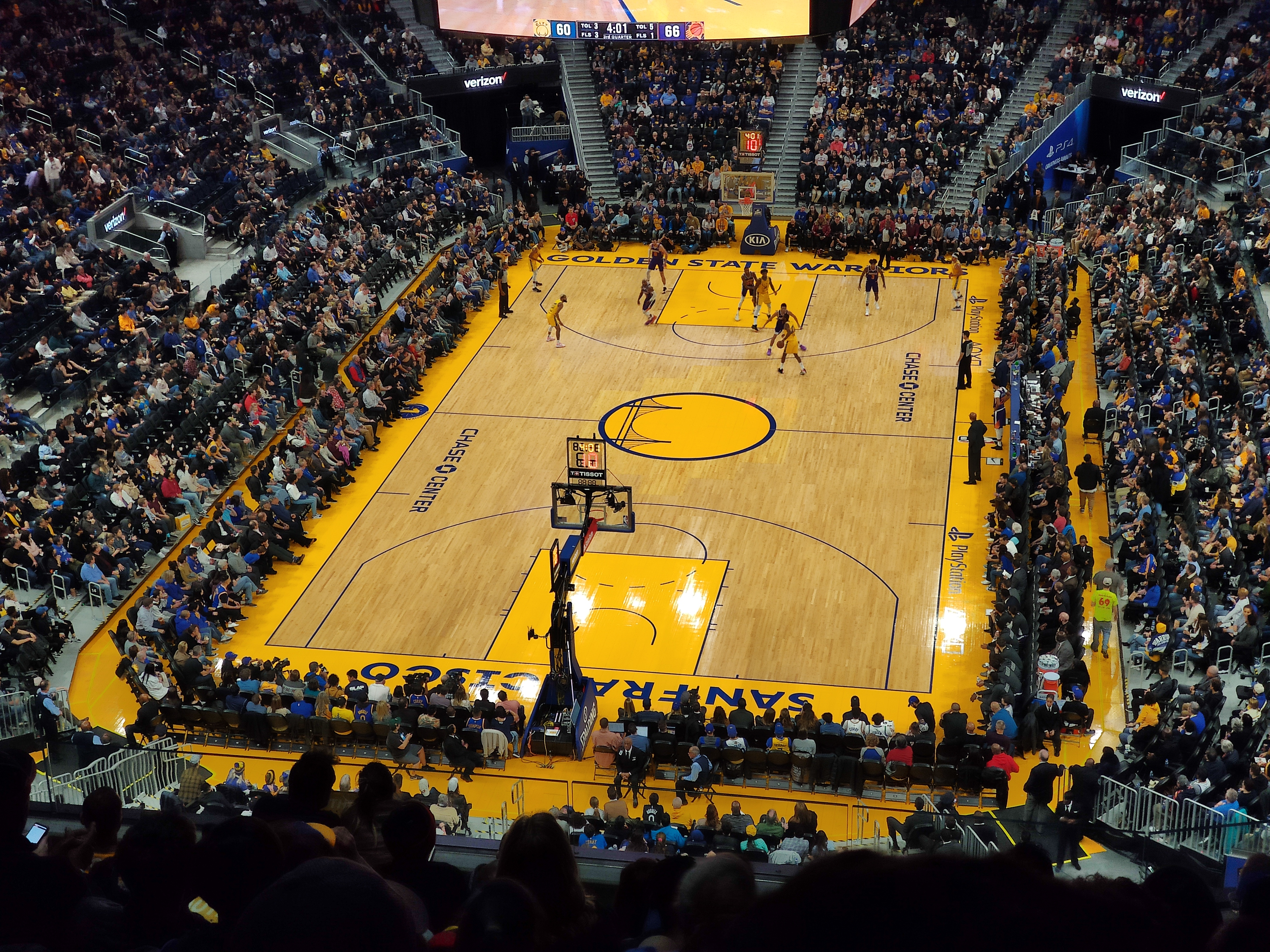
Chase Center, home of the Golden State Warriors (NBA) and the Golden State Valkyries (WNBA)

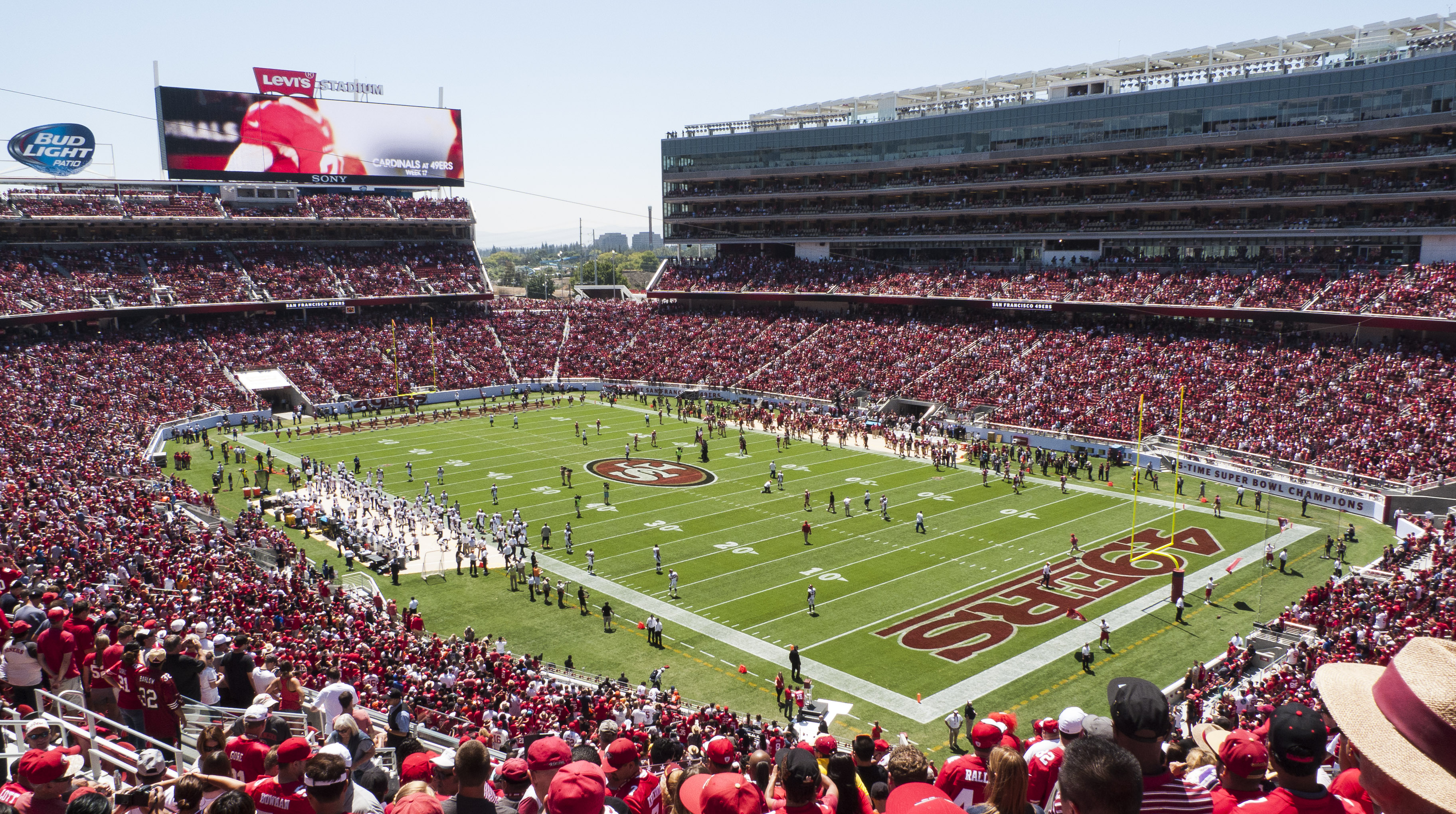
Levi's Stadium, home of the San Francisco 49ers (NFL)

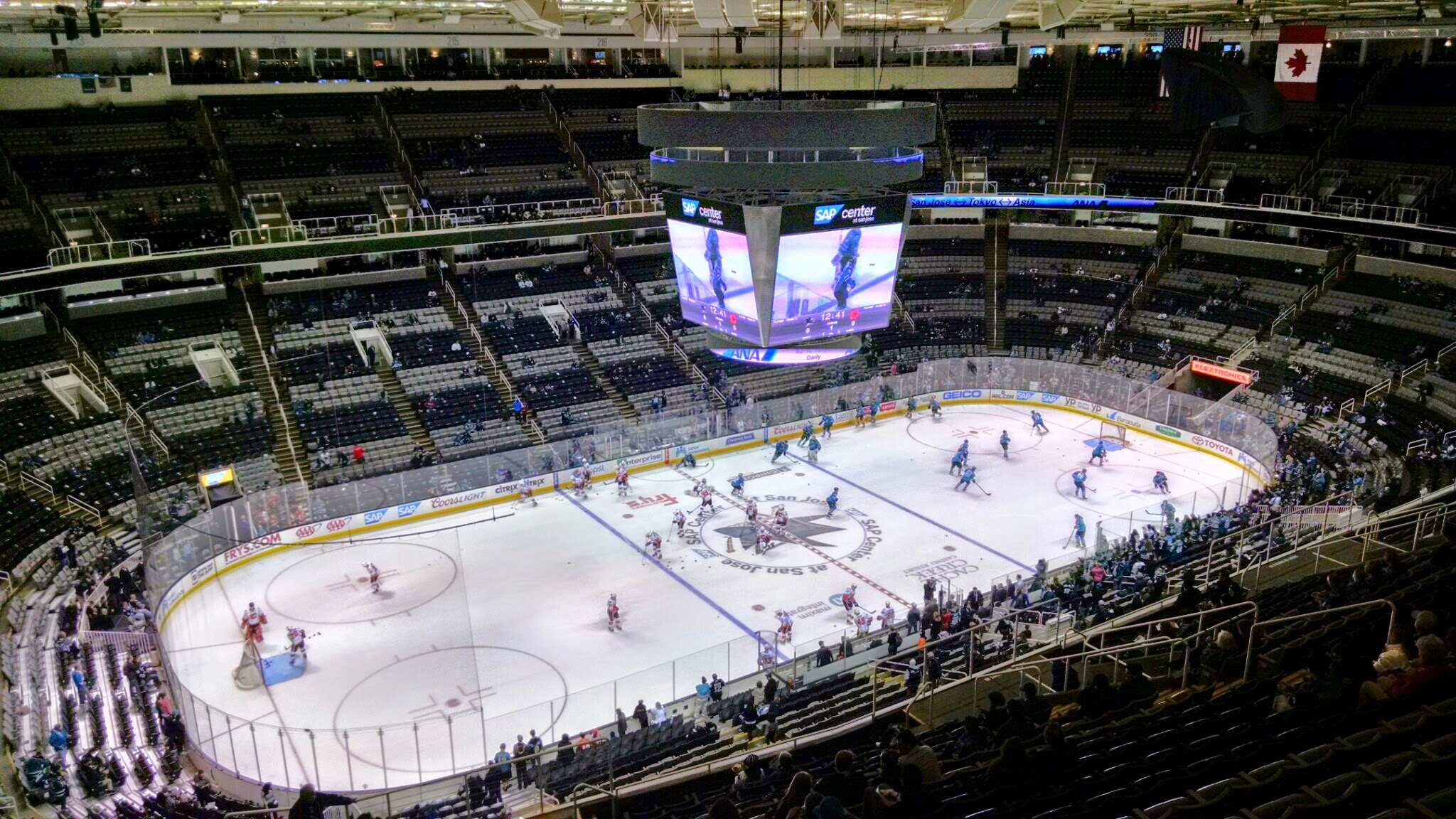
SAP Center, home of the San Jose Sharks (NHL) and San Jose Sea Lions (PWHL)

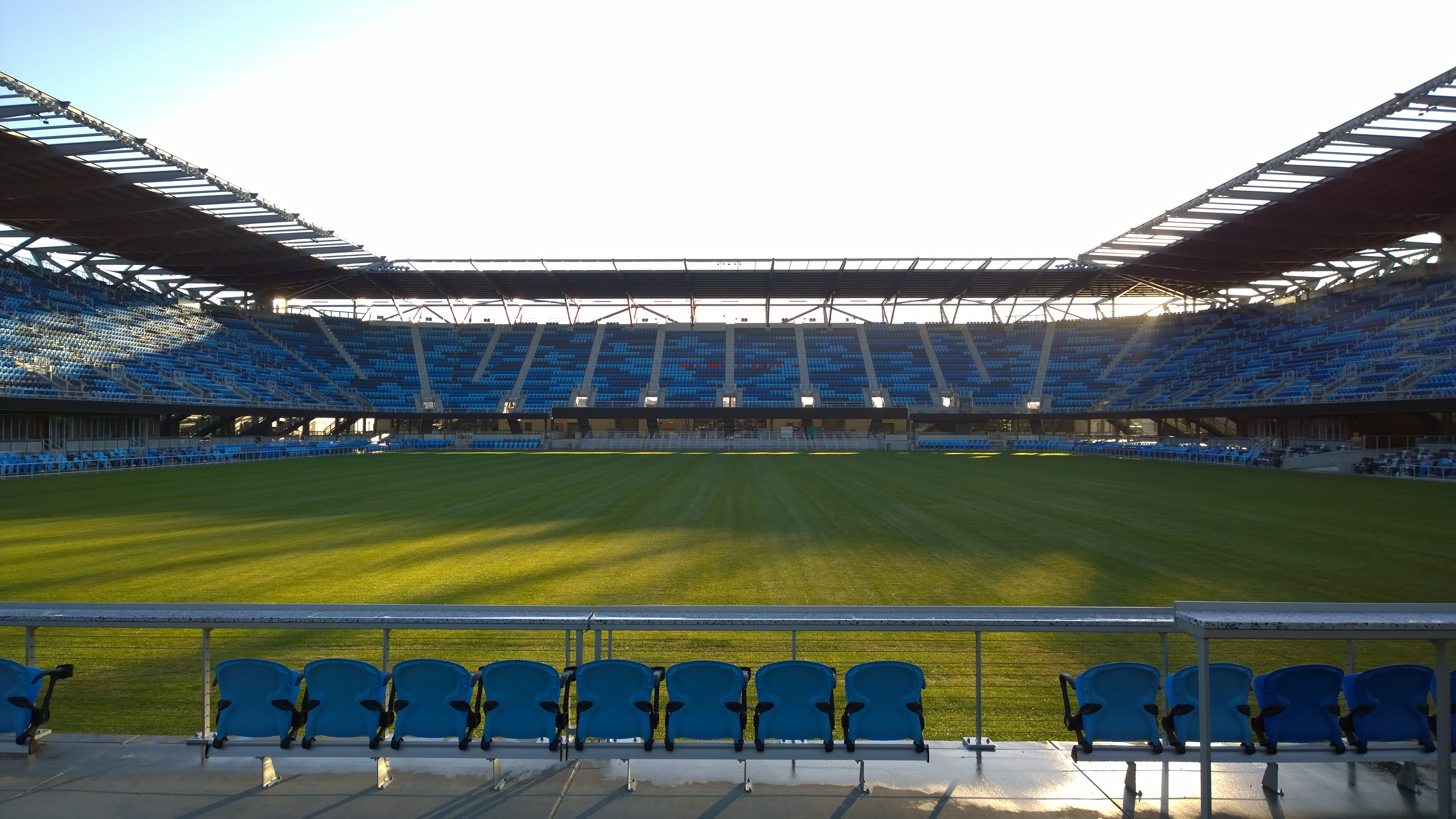
PayPal Park, home of the San Jose Earthquakes (MLS) and Bay FC (NWSL)

The San Francisco Bay Area is home to several professional and amateur sports teams. The area is one of eleven in the US to host teams from all five major professional sports leagues in the United States and Canada.

This includes the San Francisco Giants of Major League Baseball (MLB), the Golden State Warriors of the National Basketball Association (NBA), the San Francisco 49ers of the National Football League (NFL), the San Jose Sharks of the National Hockey League (NHL), and the San Jose Earthquakes of Major League Soccer (MLS).

In women's major sports leagues, the area hosts the Golden State Valkyries of the Women's National Basketball Association (WNBA) and Bay FC of the National Women's Soccer League (NWSL). Additionally, the area is home to six universities which compete in the National Collegiate Athletic Association's (NCAA) Division I.

Major sports venues in the San Francisco Bay Area include Oracle Park, Chase Center, Levi's Stadium, SAP Center, and PayPal Park.

== Major professional sports teams ==
The following teams compete in a major professional league.

Team	Sport	Bay Area since	League	Venue	City	Average attendance
San Francisco Giants	Baseball	1958	MLB	Oracle Park	San Francisco	41,677
Golden State Warriors	Basketball	1962	NBA	Chase Center	San Francisco	18,064
San Francisco 49ers	American football	1946	NFL	Levi's Stadium	Santa Clara	70,799
San Jose Sharks	Ice hockey	1991	NHL	SAP Center	San Jose	16,747
San Jose Earthquakes	Soccer	1996	MLS	PayPal Park	San Jose	20,979

== Other highest-level professional leagues ==
The following teams compete in a highest-level professional league.

Team	Sport	Bay Area since	League	Venue	City	Average attendance
Golden State Valkyries	Basketball	2025	WNBA	Chase Center	San Francisco	18,064
Bay FC	Soccer	2024	NWSL	PayPal Park	San Jose	13,617
San Francisco Unicorns	Cricket	2023	MLC	Oakland Coliseum	Oakland	11,000
San Francisco Firebells	Baseball	2025	WPBL	Robin Roberts Stadium	San Francisco	
San Jose Sea Lions	Ice hockey	2026	PWHL	SAP Center	San Jose	
NorCal Rumble	Volleyball	2027	MLV	Tech CU Arena	San Jose	
San Francisco Signal	Volleyball	2025	LOVB	Bill Graham Civic Auditorium	San Francisco	

Location of major league team's stadiums in the San Francisco Bay Area

=== Baseball ===
The Bay Area is home of a Major League Baseball team, the San Francisco Giants who play at Oracle Park and have won eight World Series titles (three as the San Francisco Giants (2010, 2012, and 2014) and five as the New York Giants).

San Francisco was ranked #1 in 2012 among America's Best Baseball cities. The study examined which U.S. metro areas have produced the most Major Leaguers since 1920.

The Bay Area was previously home of another MLB team, the Oakland Athletics. They played at the Oakland Coliseum from 1968 to 2024, and won nine World Series titles (four as the Oakland Athletics, (1972, 1973, 1974, and 1989) and five as the Philadelphia Athletics). Like the Raiders, the team will permanently relocate to Las Vegas. After the 2024 season concluded, the Oakland Athletics moved to Sutter Health Park in West Sacramento, where they are temporarily playing as simply the Athletics, without a city, state, or region in their name, until their new ballpark in Las Vegas is completed in January 2028. The Athletics had previously relocated to Oakland from Kansas City in 1967.

The 1989 World Series was known as the "Bay Bridge Series" and the "Battle of the Bay", as the Athletics and Giants played against each other, with the Athletics sweeping the Giants in a 4-game series. However, the series is also known as the "Earthquake Series" because the 1989 Loma Prieta earthquake struck on the day of Game 3.

The Bay Area has hosted the 1961, 1984, 1987, and 2007 All Star Games.

The city is also home to San Francisco Firebells of the Women's Professional Baseball League.

=== Basketball ===
The Golden State Warriors returned to San Francisco beginning with the 2019–20 NBA season when the new Chase Center opened in the Mission Bay district. Originally, the Warriors played in Philadelphia, but relocated to San Francisco in 1962 and then to Oakland in 1971. During their days in Oakland, the Warriors won four NBA Finals (1975, 2015, 2017, 2018). Their first ever championship while based in the San Francisco limits came in 2022.

The Golden State Valkyries of the WNBA started play at Chase Center in 2025 and were the league's first expansion team in 17 years. They won their first WNBA title in their second season (2026).

The Bay Area has hosted the 1967, 2000, and 2025 NBA All-Star Games.

=== American football ===
The Bay Area is home to the National Football League (NFL)'s San Francisco 49ers, who play at Levi's Stadium in Santa Clara, California. The team previously played at Candlestick Park (1971–2013) and Kezar Stadium (1946–1970) in San Francisco. The 49ers have won five Super Bowl championships: 1981 (XVI), 1984 (XIX), 1988 (XXIII), 1989 (XXIV), and 1994 (XXIX);

The Bay Area was previously home to the NFL's Oakland Raiders from 1960–1981, and later 1995–2019. The Raiders won two Super Bowl championships while in Oakland: 1976 (XI) and 1980 (XV). The team played at Kezar Stadium, Candlestick Park, and Frank Youell Field before moving into the Oakland Coliseum in 1966 and played there for the rest of their tenure. In 1982, the Raiders relocated to Los Angeles where they played until 1994. In 2020, the Raiders relocated to Las Vegas, Nevada.

The Bay Area hosted Super Bowl XIX, Super Bowl 50, and Super Bowl LX.

=== Ice hockey ===
San Jose hosts the San Jose Sharks of the National Hockey League and the San Jose Sea Lions of the Professional Women's Hockey League with both playing at the SAP Center at San Jose. The Sharks began play in 1991, playing their first two seasons at the Cow Palace before moving to their current home in 1993. They have been Pacific Division champions six times, as well as having won the Presidents' Trophy for the best regular season record in the league in 2009, and the Clarence S. Campbell Bowl as the Western Conference champions in 2016. Though the Sharks have yet to win a Stanley Cup, they made their first Stanley Cup Final appearance in 2016. The Bay Area hosted the 1997 and 2019 All Star Games. The San Jose Sea Lions begin play in 2026.

Before the Sharks, the Bay Area had the California Golden Seals, who had been previously named the California Seals and the Oakland Seals. The Seals came into existence in the 1967 NHL expansion. The Seals played at the Oakland–Alameda County Coliseum Arena (now Oracle Arena). The Seals later became the Cleveland Barons in 1976 and then merged with the Minnesota North Stars in 1978 (who in turn later became the Dallas Stars). The Golden Seals/Barons franchise is notable as the last franchise in North America's four major leagues to permanently cease operations.

=== Soccer ===
Beginning in 1996, the San Jose Earthquakes, then known as the San Jose Clash, competed in Major League Soccer, and became the Earthquakes in 1999. The Quakes won MLS Cup 2001 against the Los Angeles Galaxy 2–1, as well as MLS Cup 2003 against the Chicago Fire 4–2. The Quakes then moved to Houston in 2005, and became the Houston Dynamo, but in a fashion similar to the Cleveland Browns move, the Earthquakes name and history stayed in San Jose for a future team. In 2008, the current incarnation of the Earthquakes made its return and subsequently played seven seasons at Buck Shaw Stadium in Santa Clara. In March 2015, the Earthquakes opened Avaya Stadium, now known as PayPal Park, across from San Jose International Airport. The Bay Area hosted the 2016 MLS All-Star Game. PayPal Park will host eight soccer matches during the 2028 Summer Olympics.

In April 2023, the National Women's Soccer League, the top level of the women's game in the US, announced that it had awarded a new Bay Area franchise that began play in 2024. The team revealed its identity as Bay FC on June 1, and announced on July 21 that it would play its home games at PayPal Park.

The Bay Area was a host of the 1994 FIFA World Cup and later served as one of eleven US hosts of the 2026 FIFA World Cup.

==== 1994 FIFA World Cup ====
Stanford Stadium hosted a total of six matches during the 1994 FIFA World Cup:

Date	Time (UTC−7)	Team #1	Result	Team #2	Round	Attendance
June 20, 1994	13:00	Brazil	2–0	Russia	Group B	81,061
June 24, 1994	13:00	Brazil	3–0	Cameroon	Group B	83,401
June 26, 1994	13:00	Switzerland	0–2	Colombia	Group A	83,401
June 28, 1994	13:00	Russia	6–1	Cameroon	Group B	74,914
July 4, 1994	12:35	Brazil	1–0	United States	Round of 16	84,147
July 10, 1994	12:35	Romania	2–2 (a.e.t.) (4–5 pen.)	Sweden	Quarter-final	83,500

==== 2026 FIFA World Cup ====
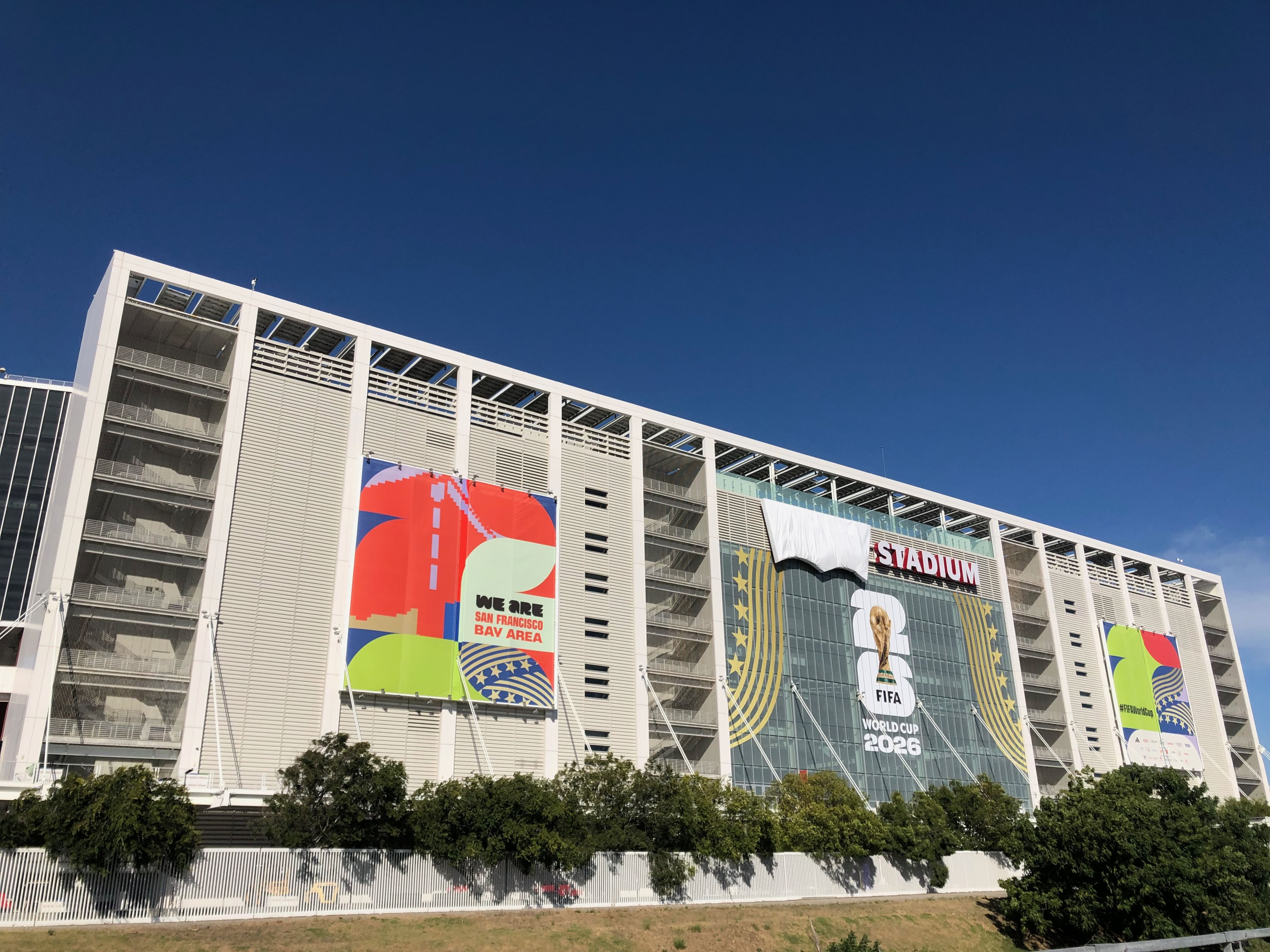
Levi’s Stadium during the 2026 FIFA World Cup. The stadium was temporarily rebranded as San Francisco Bay Area Stadium for the tournament.

Levi's Stadium was one of 16 venues which hosted matches during the 2026 FIFA World Cup. It was one of eleven US venues for the tournament and was also one of two venues in California which hosted matches, the other being SoFi Stadium in the Los Angeles suburb of Inglewood. During the event, the stadium was temporarily renamed to "San Francisco Bay Area Stadium" in accordance with FIFA's policy on corporate-sponsored names. The stadium hosted six matches: five group stage matches and one Round of 32 match, which included the United States, which advanced to the Round of 16.

Date	Time (UTC−7)	Team #1	Res.	Team #2	Round	Attendance
June 13, 2026	12:00	Qatar	1–1	Switzerland	Group B	67,966
June 16, 2026	21:00	Austria	3–1	Jordan	Group J	68,527
June 19, 2026	20:00	Turkey	0–1	Paraguay	Group D	68,827
June 22, 2026	20:00	Jordan	1–2	Algeria	Group J	68,371
June 25, 2026	19:00	Paraguay	0–0	Australia	Group D	68,827
July 1, 2026	17:00	United States	2–0	Bosnia and Herzegovina	Round of 32	68,827

=== Cricket ===
The San Francisco Bay Area is home to the San Francisco Unicorns of Major League Cricket. They play their home games at the Oakland Coliseum.

== Major professional sports team championships ==
=== Oakland Athletics (MLB) ===
4 World Series titles (Note: Does not include titles won in Philadelphia)

- 1972
- 1973
- 1974
- 1989

=== San Francisco Giants (MLB) ===
3 World Series titles (Note: Does not include titles won in New York)

- 2010
- 2012
- 2014

=== San Francisco 49ers (NFL) ===
5 Super Bowl titles

- 1981 (XVI)
- 1984 (XIX)
- 1988 (XXIII)
- 1989 (XXIV)
- 1994 (XXIX)

=== Oakland Raiders (NFL) ===
2 Super Bowl titles (Note: Does not include titles won in Los Angeles)

- 1976 (XI)
- 1980 (XV)

=== Golden State Warriors (NBA) ===
5 NBA Finals titles (Note: Does not include titles won in Philadelphia)

- 1975
- 2015
- 2017
- 2018
- 2022

=== Oakland Oaks (ABA) ===
1 ABA Finals title

- 1969

=== Oakland Clippers (NASL) ===
1 NASL Final title

- 1967

=== San Jose Earthquakes (MLS) ===
2 MLS Cup titles

- 2001
- 2003

=== Golden State Valkyries (WNBA) ===
1 WNBA Finals title

- 2026

== Minor league teams ==
Minor league professional teams
Team	Sport	League	Venue
Oakland Ballers	Baseball	Minor League Baseball (Pioneer League)	Raimondi Park
East Bay Blazers	Cricket	Minor League Cricket	Morgan Hills Sports Complex
Silicon Valley Strikers	Cricket	Minor League Cricket	Morgan Hills Sports Complex
San Jose Barracuda	Ice hockey	American Hockey League	Tech CU Arena
Oakland Roots SC	Soccer	USL Championship	Oakland Coliseum
San Jose Earthquakes II	Soccer	MLS Next Pro	PayPal Park, other venues
Bay Area Panthers	Indoor Football	Indoor Football League	SAP Center
San Jose Giants	Baseball	California League	San Jose Municipal Stadium

=== Baseball ===
The San Jose Giants are a Minor League Baseball team in the California League. They've been a farm team of the San Francisco Giants since 1988 and have played continuously since 1962 under several different names and affiliations. The San Jose Giants have developed more than 190 major league players, including current and former San Francisco Giants such as Buster Posey, Tim Lincecum, Matt Cain, Pablo Sandoval, and Madison Bumgarner.

The Oakland Ballers are a Minor League Baseball team in the Pioneer League that was created in 2024 as a response to the Oakland Athletics relocation to Las Vegas.

In the Bay Area Collegiate League, Palo Alto is home to the Palo Alto Oaks, the oldest continuously operated, wood-bat, baseball team in the Bay Area. The Oaks played their inaugural season in 1950, making 2018 their 69th consecutive season of baseball. They are joined by seven other teams in the Bay Area: Alameda Merchants, Burlingame Bucks, San Carlos Salty Dogs, San Mateo Rounders, Solano Mudcats, Walnut Creek Crawdags, and the West Coast Kings.

=== Soccer ===
Amateur men's soccer has been played in San Francisco since 1902 through the San Francisco Soccer Football League. Over 40 teams in 4 divisions play throughout the city between March and November. Premier Division games are played at the 3,500-seat Boxer Stadium. Amateur women's soccer is played on over 30 teams in the Golden Gate Women's Soccer League.

Supporter-owned San Francisco City FC, founded in 2001 as part of the SFSFL, has played in USL League Two since 2016.

San Francisco Glens SC, commonly known as SF Glens, is an American soccer club based in San Francisco that was founded in 1961. Their first team currently competes in USL League Two.

Project 51O is a soccer club from Oakland, California, competing in the Southwest Division of USL League Two. They are the reserve club of USL Championship club Oakland Roots SC.

El Farolito is an amateur soccer club based out of San Francisco, California. It currently plays in the National Premier Soccer League.

Napa Valley 1839 FC is a men's soccer club based in Napa, California. It competes in the NPSL Golden Gate Conference. The club's colors are green and white.

Sonoma County Sol is an American soccer team based in Santa Rosa, California, United States. Founded in 2004, the team plays in the National Premier Soccer League

=== Other sports ===
In 2015, the Sharks American Hockey League affiliate team, the Worcester Sharks, became the San Jose Barracuda and share the SAP Center at San Jose until the 2021–2022 season. The San Jose Barracuda now play their home games at the sparkling new Tech CU Arena next to the San Jose Municipal Stadium and adjacent to San Jose State CEFCU Stadium.

The San Francisco Pro-Am Basketball League is an important summer league venue for aspiring players to be discovered by talent scouts. Games are held at the 4,000 seat Kezar Pavilion. Players from all levels participate, with regular appearances by off season NBA professionals.

San Francisco Rush played in the inaugural 2016 PRO Rugby season at Boxer Stadium. The club folded after one season. The San Francisco Golden Gate Rugby team competes in the Pacific Rugby Premiership. In rugby sevens, the Bay Area hosted the 2018 Rugby World Cup Sevens at AT&T Park which saw over 100,000 in attendance over the three days of the tournament.

The Silicon Valley Strikers and Bay Blazers are teams playing in the 2021 inaugural season of Minor League Cricket.

The San Francisco FlameThrowers Ultimate (sport) team were founded in 2014 when the American Ultimate Disc League (AUDL) expanded to the west coast. In 2017, the Flamethrowers won the AUDL Championship game, with a final score of 30–29 over the Toronto Rush. The FlameThrowers folded after the 2018 season, but maintained rights to the FlameThrower brand and hinted at a rebirth as a women's team.

The Oakland Spiders ultimate team also joined the league in 2014 as the then San Jose Spiders. They won the league championship during their inaugural year and the following year in 2015. They play home games at Foothill College Stadium.

The Oakland Panthers of the Indoor Football League were set to begin play in 2020 at Oakland Arena, looking to fill the hole left by the Raiders' departure, but the season was canceled by the onset of the COVID-19 pandemic. The team also withdrew from the 2021 season, then moved to San Jose as the Bay Area Panthers for 2022.

The Bay Area Blasters are a professional table tennis franchise based in the San Francisco Bay Area that competes in Major League Table Tennis (MLTT). Established in 2023 as one of the league's original eight teams, the Blasters compete in the West Division.

== College sports ==
The Bay Area is also well represented in college sports. Six area universities are members of NCAA Division I, the highest level of college sports in the country. Three have football teams and three do not. Bay Area Deportes is the only media outlet in San Francisco Bay Area to fully cover NCAA college sports in Spanish.

All three football-playing schools in the Bay Area are in the Football Bowl Subdivision, the highest level of NCAA college football. The California Golden Bears and Stanford Cardinal compete in the Atlantic Coast Conference, and the San Jose State Spartans compete in the Mountain West Conference. The Cardinal and Golden Bears are intense rivals, with their football teams competing annually in the Big Game for the Stanford Axe. One of the most famous games in the rivalry is the 1982 edition, when the Golden Bears defeated the Cardinal on a last-second kickoff return known as "The Play".

The three non-football Division I programs in the Bay Area are the San Francisco Dons, located in the city of San Francisco; the Saint Mary's Gaels, from Moraga in the East Bay; and the Santa Clara Broncos, located in Santa Clara. All three are charter members of the West Coast Conference, and consider each other major rivals.

The following table shows the college teams in the Bay Area that average more than 2,000 attendance:

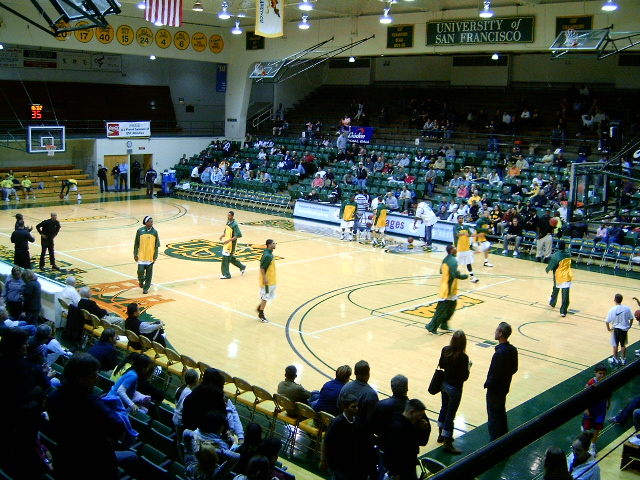
The San Francisco Dons men's basketball team plays at War Memorial at the Sobrato Center.

Team	Location	Venue	Average Attendance
California Golden Bears football	Berkeley	Memorial Stadium	47,675
Stanford Cardinal football	Stanford	Stanford Stadium	47,862
San Jose State Spartans football	San Jose	CEFCU Stadium	16,058
California Golden Bears men's basketball	Berkeley	Haas Pavilion	5,627
Stanford Cardinal men's basketball	Stanford	Maples Pavilion	3,894
Saint Mary's Gaels men's basketball	Moraga	McKeon Pavilion	3,085
Stanford Cardinal women's basketball	Stanford	Maples Pavilion	3,063
California Golden Bears women's basketball	Berkeley	Haas Pavilion	3,000
Stanford Cardinal women's volleyball	Stanford	Maples Pavilion	2,425
San Jose State Spartans men's basketball	San Jose	Provident Credit Union Event Center	2,282
San Francisco Dons men's basketball	San Francisco	War Memorial at the Sobrato Center	2,100

== Other sports ==
The Bay Area hosted the 2013 America's Cup sailing race. The Bay Area has an active outdoor and action sports culture. Examples include mountain biking, the Escape from Alcatraz triathlon, team handball (Olympic handball), skateboarding/Thrasher Magazine, CrossFit (Santa Cruz) and surfing at well known breaks such as Steamer Lane, Mavericks, Ocean Beach and Bodega Bay.

TPC Stonebrae is a private golf club that hosts the TPC Stonebrae Championship, part of the Korn Ferry Tour since 2009.

SF CALHEAT is a Team Handball club which participates in tournaments across the nation at all levels

San Francisco Team Handball is the only team handball club focused on youth (U14 / Middle School) and (U18 / High School), competing at local and international levels.

== Esports ==
San Francisco Shock were an American professional Overwatch esports team based in San Francisco, California. The Shock compete in the Overwatch League (OWL) as a member of the league's Pacific West Division. In their time with the OWL, the Shock won three midseason tournament titles, qualified for four season playoffs, reached the Grand Finals three times, and won back-to-back Grand Finals, making them one of the most accomplished franchises in Overwatch League history.

Founded in 2017, San Francisco Shock is one of the twelve founding members of the OWL and is one of three professional Overwatch teams in California. The team is owned by Andy Miller, co-owner of the Sacramento Kings and NRG Esports. In the upcoming season, the team will play their home matches at Zellerbach Hall in Berkeley and the San Jose Civic in downtown San Jose.

The League of Legends World Championship was held in 4 locations, one of them being held in San Francisco, California, at Chase Center.

== Recreation ==
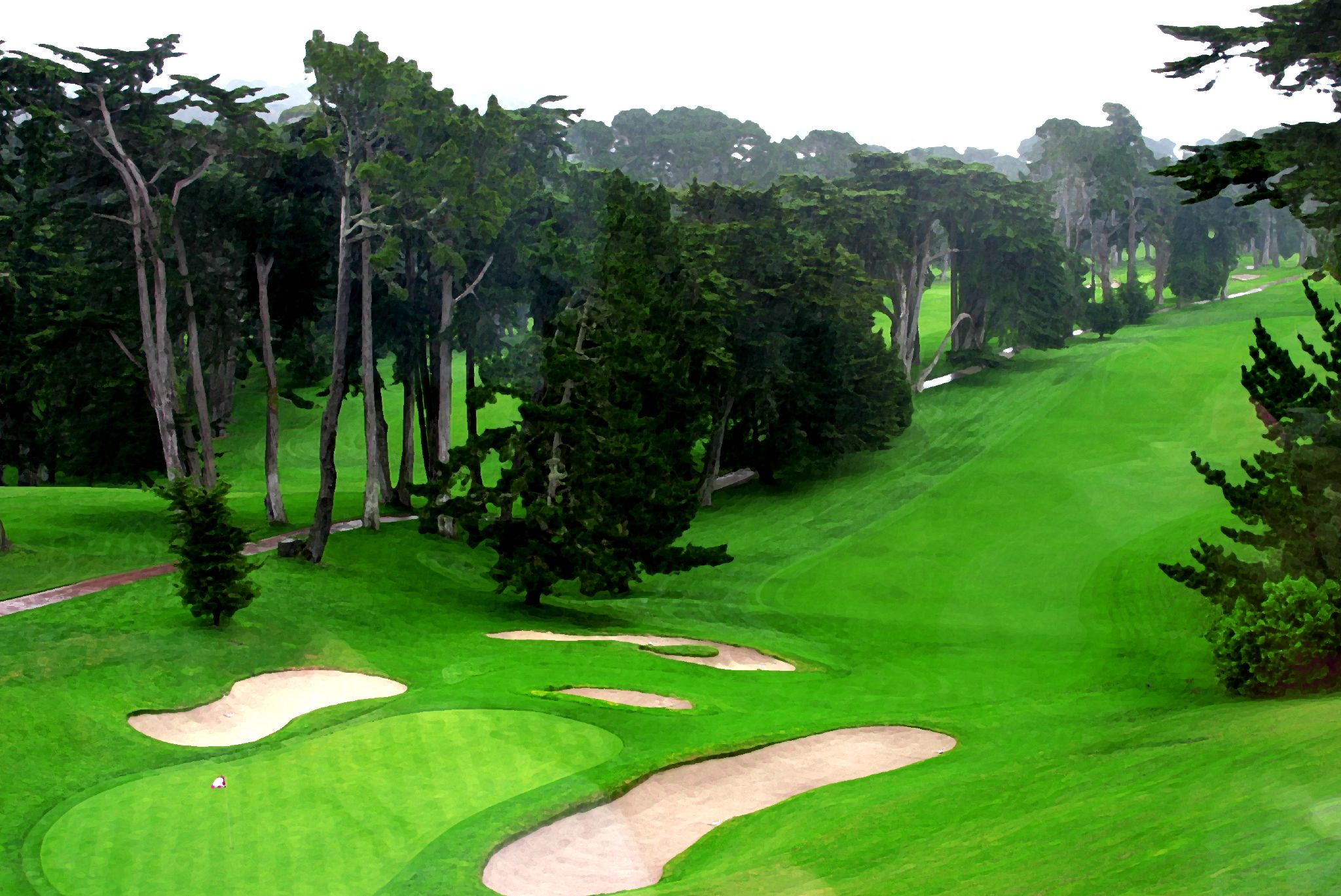
The 18th hole at the Olympic Club.

With an ideal climate for outdoor activities, San Francisco has ample resources and opportunities for amateur and participatory sports and recreation. There are more than 200 miles (320 km) of bicycle paths, lanes and bike routes in the city, and the Embarcadero and Marina Green are favored sites for skateboarding. Public tennis facilities are available in Golden Gate Park and Dolores Park, as well as at smaller neighborhood courts throughout the city. San Francisco residents have often ranked among the fittest in the U.S. Golden Gate Park has miles of paved and unpaved running trails as well as a golf course and disc golf course.

Boating, sailing, windsurfing and kitesurfing are among the popular activities on San Francisco Bay, and the city maintains a yacht harbor in the Marina District. The St. Francis Yacht Club and Golden Gate Yacht Club are located in the Marina Harbor. The South Beach Yacht Club is located next to AT&T Park and Pier 39 has an extensive marina.

Historic Aquatic Park located along the northern San Francisco shore hosts two swimming and rowing clubs: the South End Rowing Club and the Dolphin Club, described as "frenemy". Swimmers can be seen daily braving the typically cold bay waters.

== Defunct teams ==
=== Basketball ===
San Jose had a women's basketball team from 2005 to 2006 in the National Women's Basketball League called the San Jose Spiders.

=== American football ===
From 1995 to 2008, as well as between 2011 and 2015, the Bay had the San Jose SaberCats of the Arena Football League, who played at the SAP Center at San Jose. The SaberCats won 3 ArenaBowls (XVI, XVIII, XXI), and lost in another (XXII).

The Bay Area had a United Football League team in 2009 named the California Redwoods, who played at AT&T Park and Spartan Stadium, though the Redwoods moved to Sacramento in 2010.

=== Hockey ===
For one season (1995–96), it was home to the San Francisco Spiders of the International Hockey League.

The San Francisco Bulls were founded as an expansion team in the ECHL and began play in the 2012–13 season. The team was based at the Cow Palace and was the farm team of the NHL's San Jose Sharks before folding mid-season on January 27, 2014.

=== Soccer ===
Before the existence of the current San Jose Earthquakes of MLS, a separate San Jose Earthquakes played for the original North American Soccer League, Major Indoor Soccer League, and the Western Soccer Alliance. After they folded, the San Francisco Bay Blackhawks played for the WSA. Eventually, the Blawkhawks became the San Jose Hawks, and folded in 1993.

San Jose Grizzlies were a professional indoor soccer team based in San Jose, California. The team was founded in 1993 as a member of the Continental Indoor Soccer League. After playing in the 1994 and 1995 CISL seasons, the Grizzlies folded following the 1995 season. The team played at San Jose Arena.

FC Gold Pride was a charter member of Women's Professional Soccer, playing alongside the Earthquakes in the league's inaugural 2009 season before moving to Hayward for 2010. Led by Brazilian star Marta, the team had a championship season in 2010, but folded after the season. WPS itself played only one more season before folding. The Bay Area did not receive franchise in WPS' effective successor, the current National Women's Soccer League, until the announcement of the future Bay FC in 2023.

San Francisco Deltas was a charter member of the second North American Soccer League to play at the Kezar Stadium in 2017. The Deltas beat the New York Cosmos 2–0 to win the Soccer Bowl 2017, but folded after the season.

== Stadiums and arenas ==
=== Current ===
Stadium	City	Capacity	Type	Tenants	Opened
Levi's Stadium	Santa Clara	68,500	Football	San Francisco 49ers San Jose Earthquakes (some games)	2014
Oakland Coliseum	Oakland	63,026	Multi-purpose	San Francisco Unicorns Oakland Roots SC; Oakland Soul SC	1966
California Memorial Stadium	Berkeley	62,717	Football	California Golden Bears	1923
Stanford Stadium	Stanford	50,000	Football	Stanford Cardinal	1921; 2006
Oracle Park	San Francisco	41,503	Baseball	San Francisco Giants	2000
CEFCU Stadium	San Jose	30,456	Football	San Jose State Spartans	1933
SAP Center at San Jose	San Jose	18,543	Arena	San Jose Sharks; San Jose Barracuda	1993
PayPal Park	San Jose	18,000	Soccer	San Jose Earthquakes; Bay FC	2015
Chase Center	San Francisco	18,064	Arena	Golden State Warriors; Golden State Valkyries	2019
Cow Palace	Daly City	12,953	Arena		1941
Haas Pavilion	Berkeley	11,858	Arena	California Golden Bears	1933
Maples Pavilion	Stanford	7,392	Arena	Stanford Cardinal	1969
Laney College Football Stadium	Oakland	5,500	Football / soccer	Laney Eagles	1966 (?)
Raimondi Park	Oakland	4,000	Baseball	Oakland Ballers	1947
Provident Credit Union Event Center	San Jose	5,000	Arena	San Jose State Spartans	1989
San Jose Municipal Stadium	San Jose	4,200	Baseball	San Jose Giants; San Jose State Spartans	1942
Tech CU Arena	San Jose	4,200	Arena	San Jose Barracuda	2022

=== Defunct ===
Stadium	City	Capacity	Type	Tenants	Opened	Closed	Fate
Candlestick Park	San Francisco	70,207	Multi-purpose	San Francisco Giants; San Francisco 49ers	1960	2013	Demolished

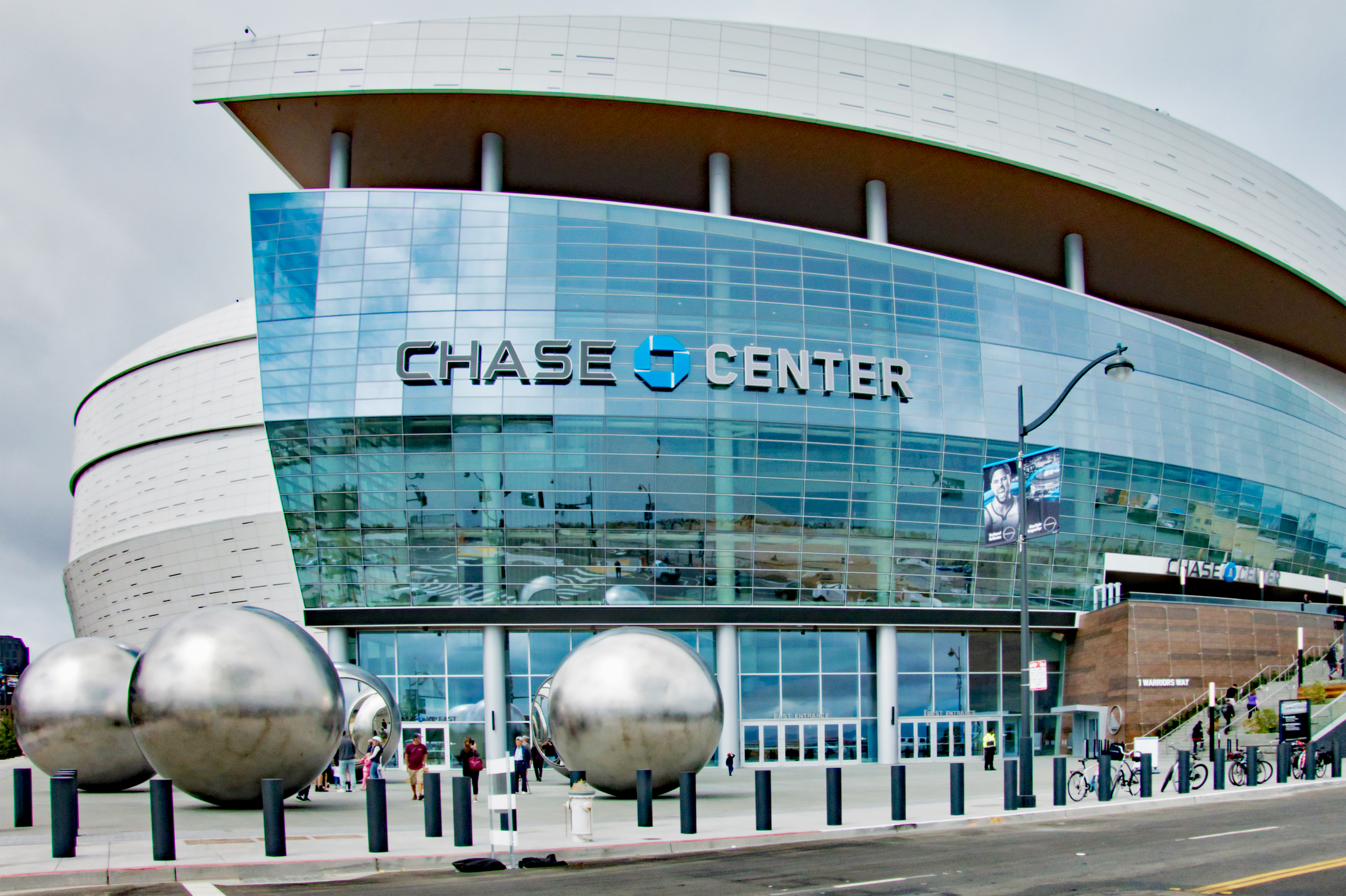
Chase Center, home of the Golden State Warriors and Golden State Valkyries

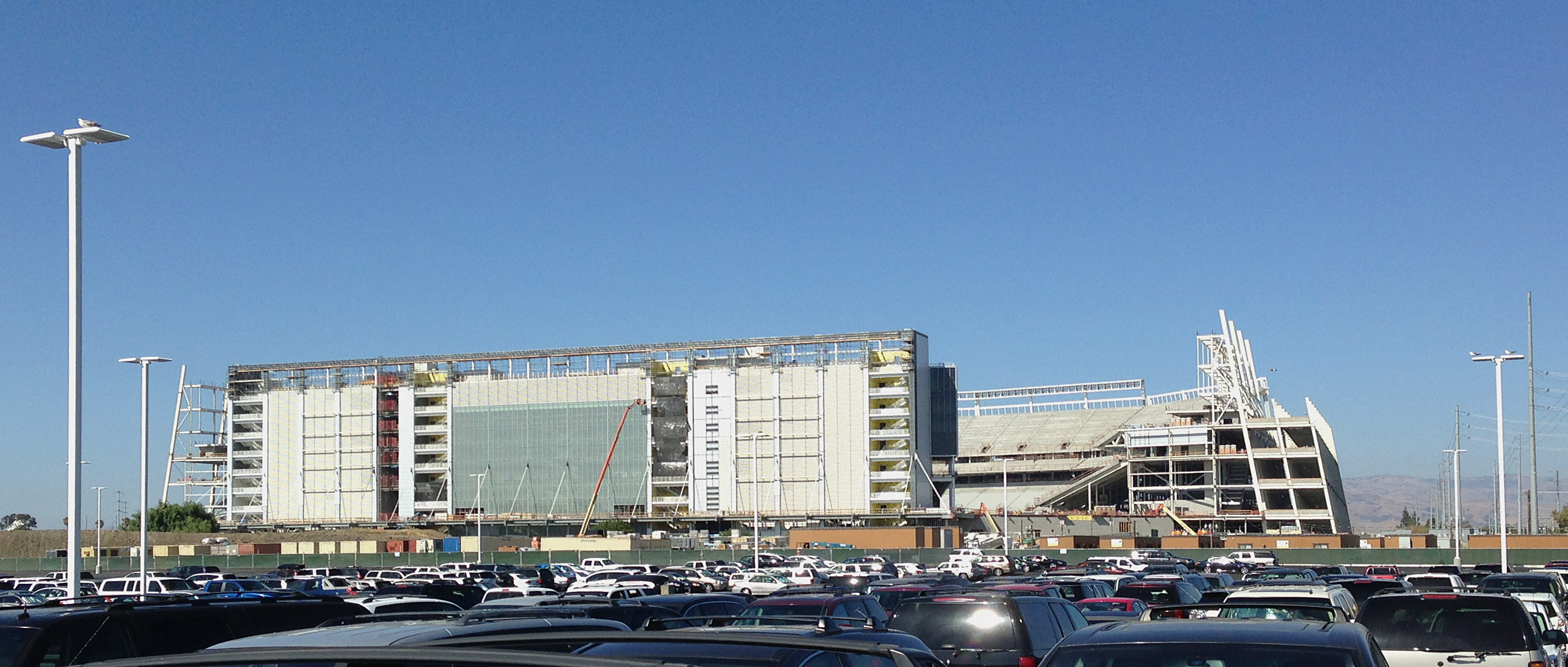
Levi's Stadium, home of the San Francisco 49ers

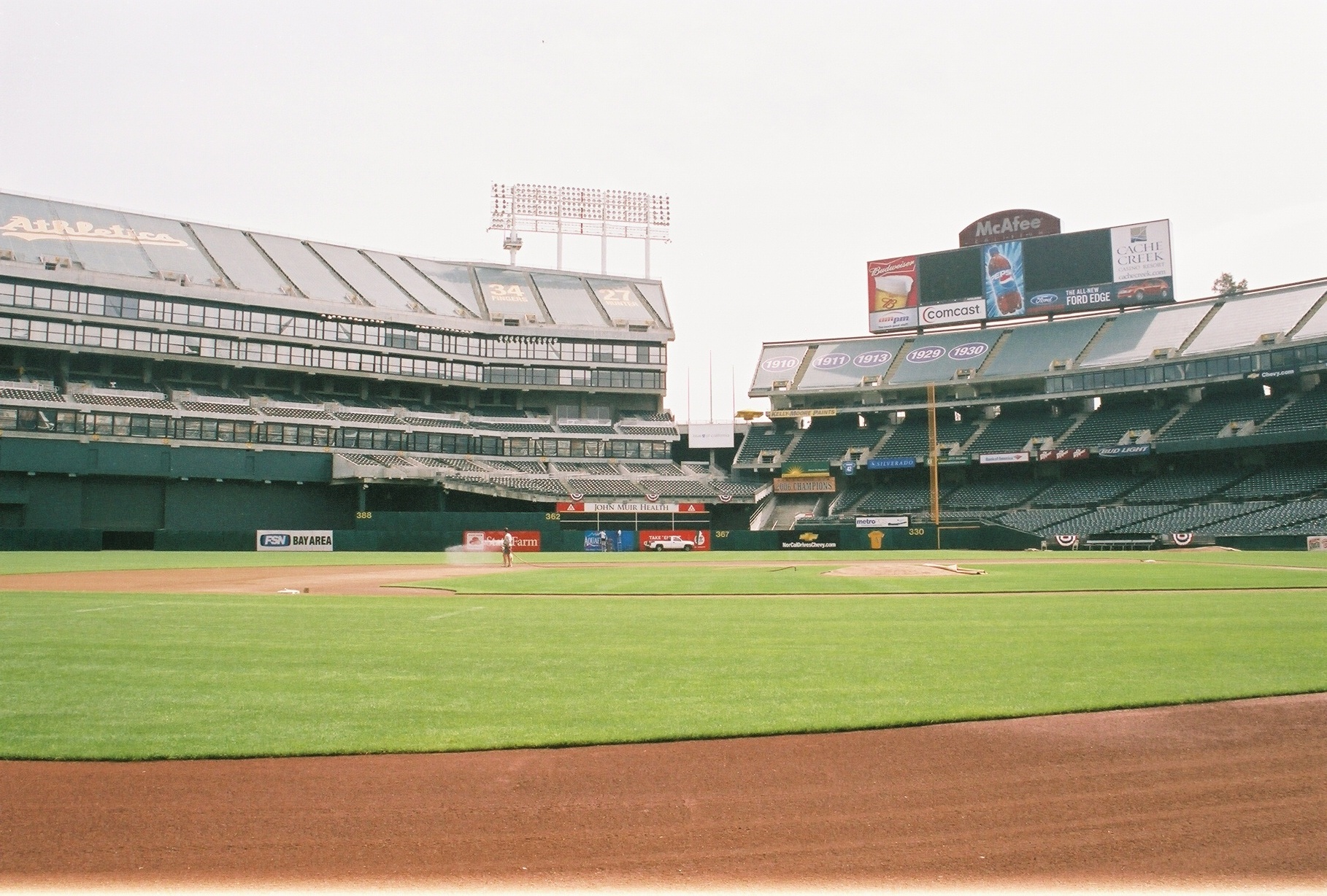
Oakland Coliseum, former home of the Oakland Athletics and Oakland Raiders

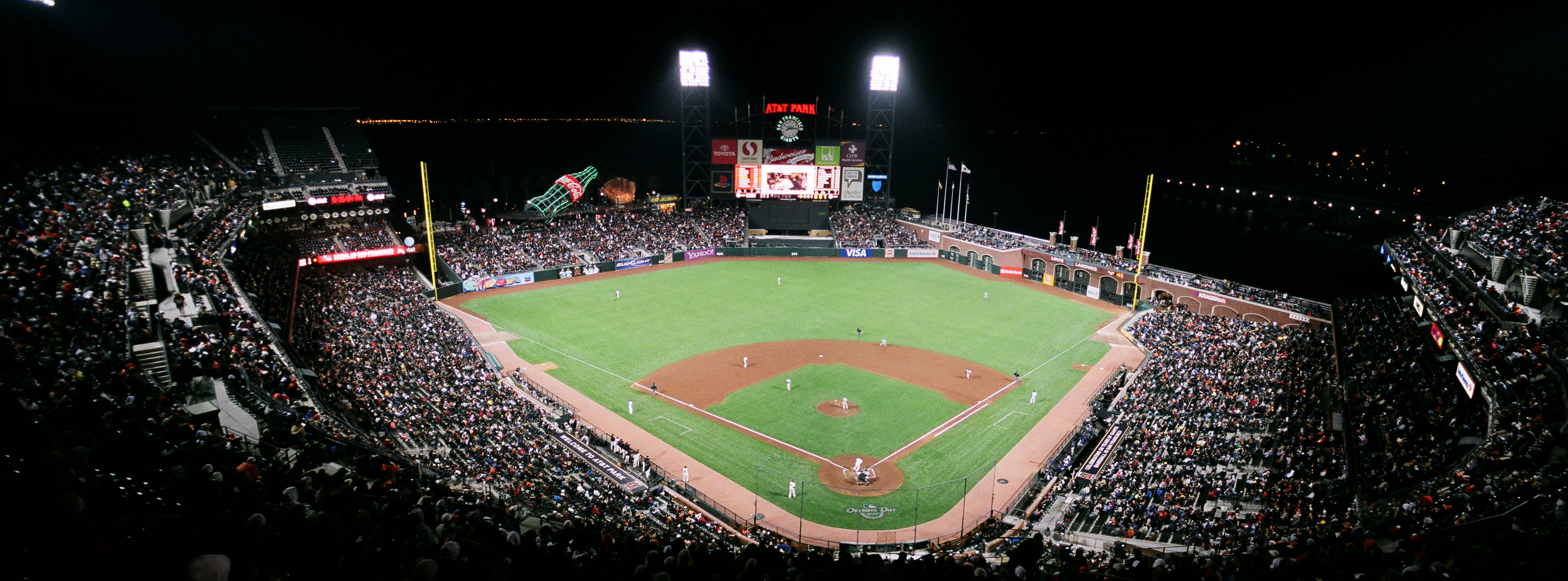
Oracle Park, home of the San Francisco Giants

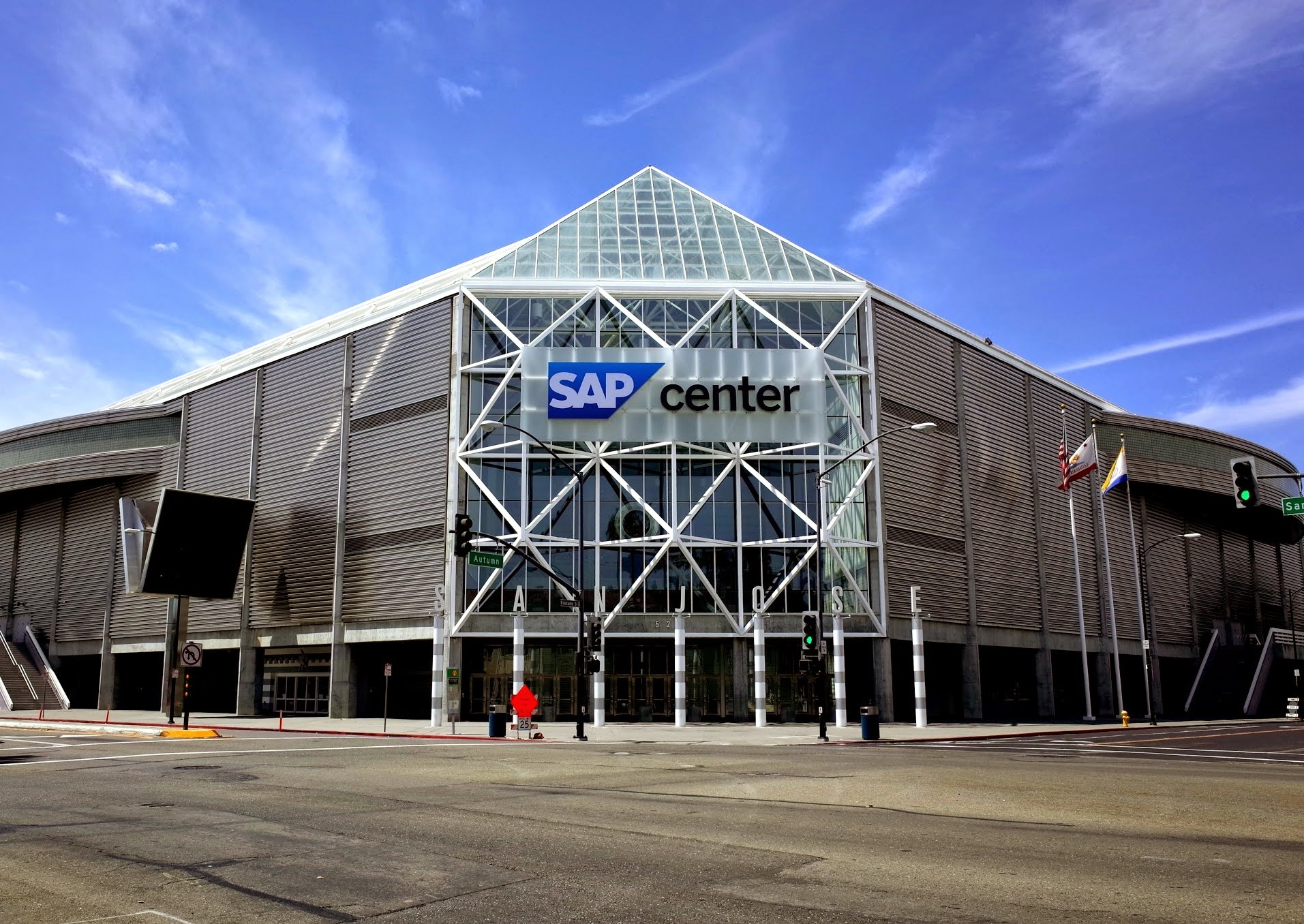
SAP Center at San Jose, home of the San Jose Sharks and San Jose Barracuda

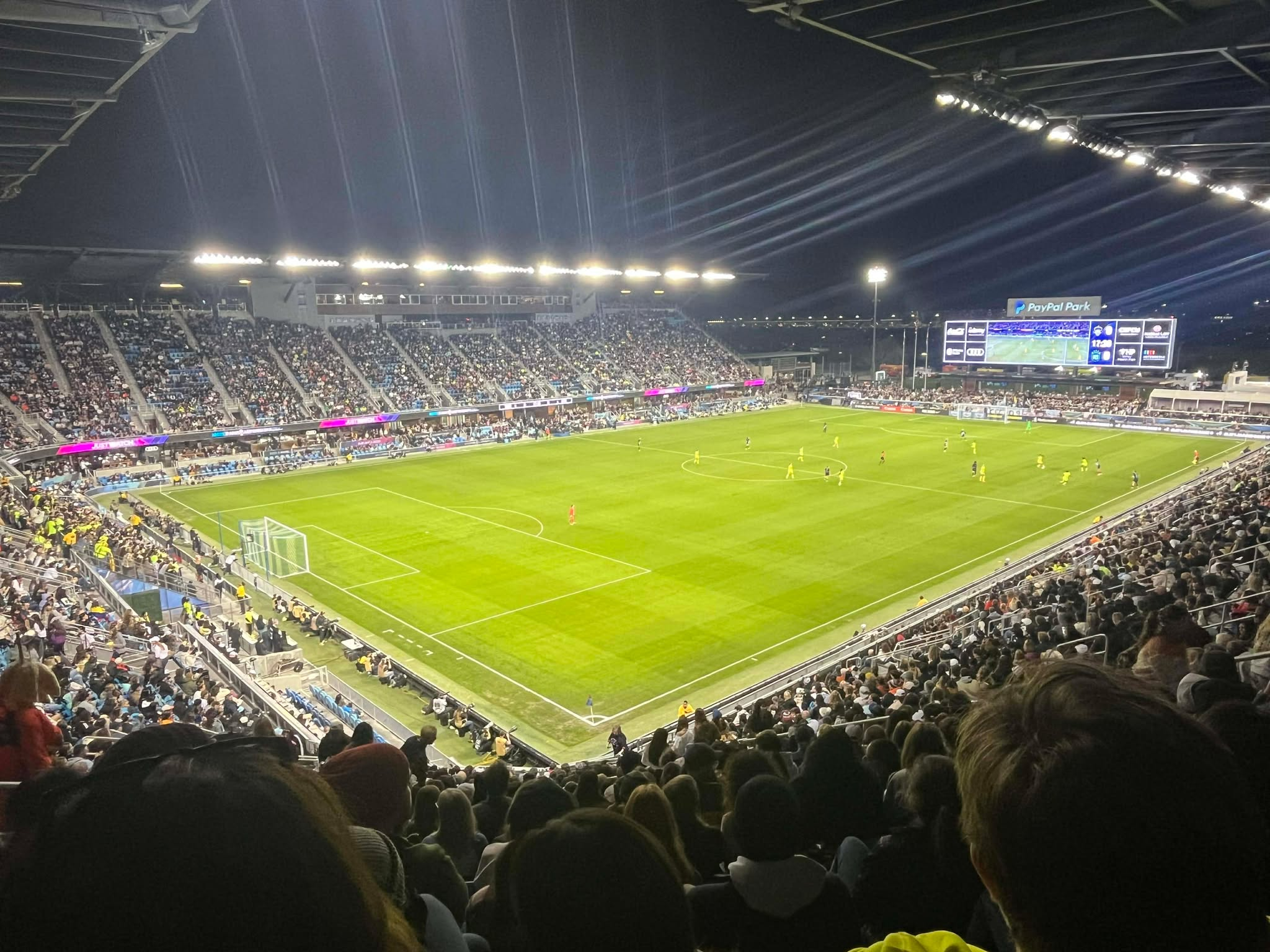
PayPal Park, home of the San Jose Earthquakes and Bay FC

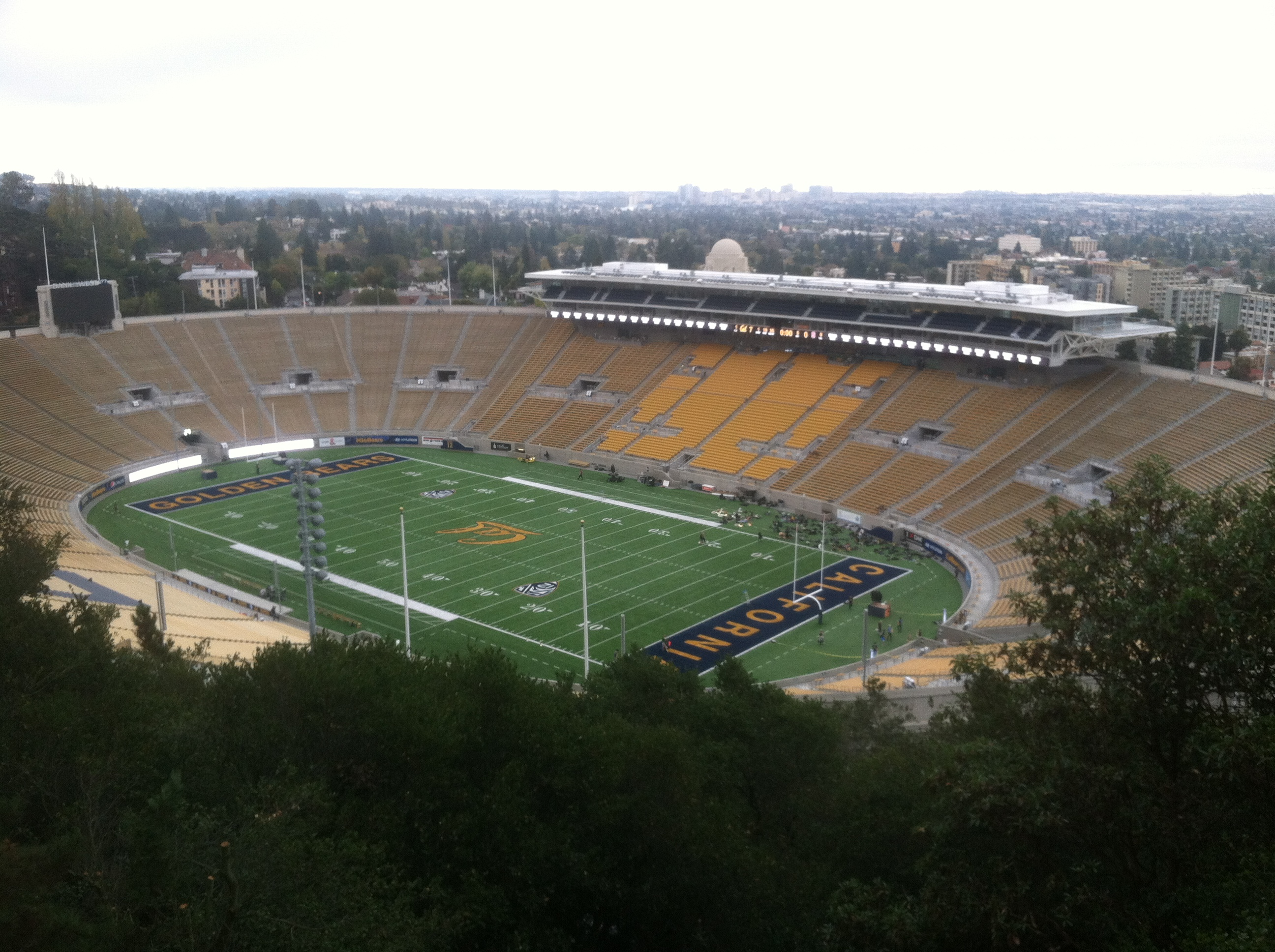
California Memorial Stadium, home of the California Golden Bears football team

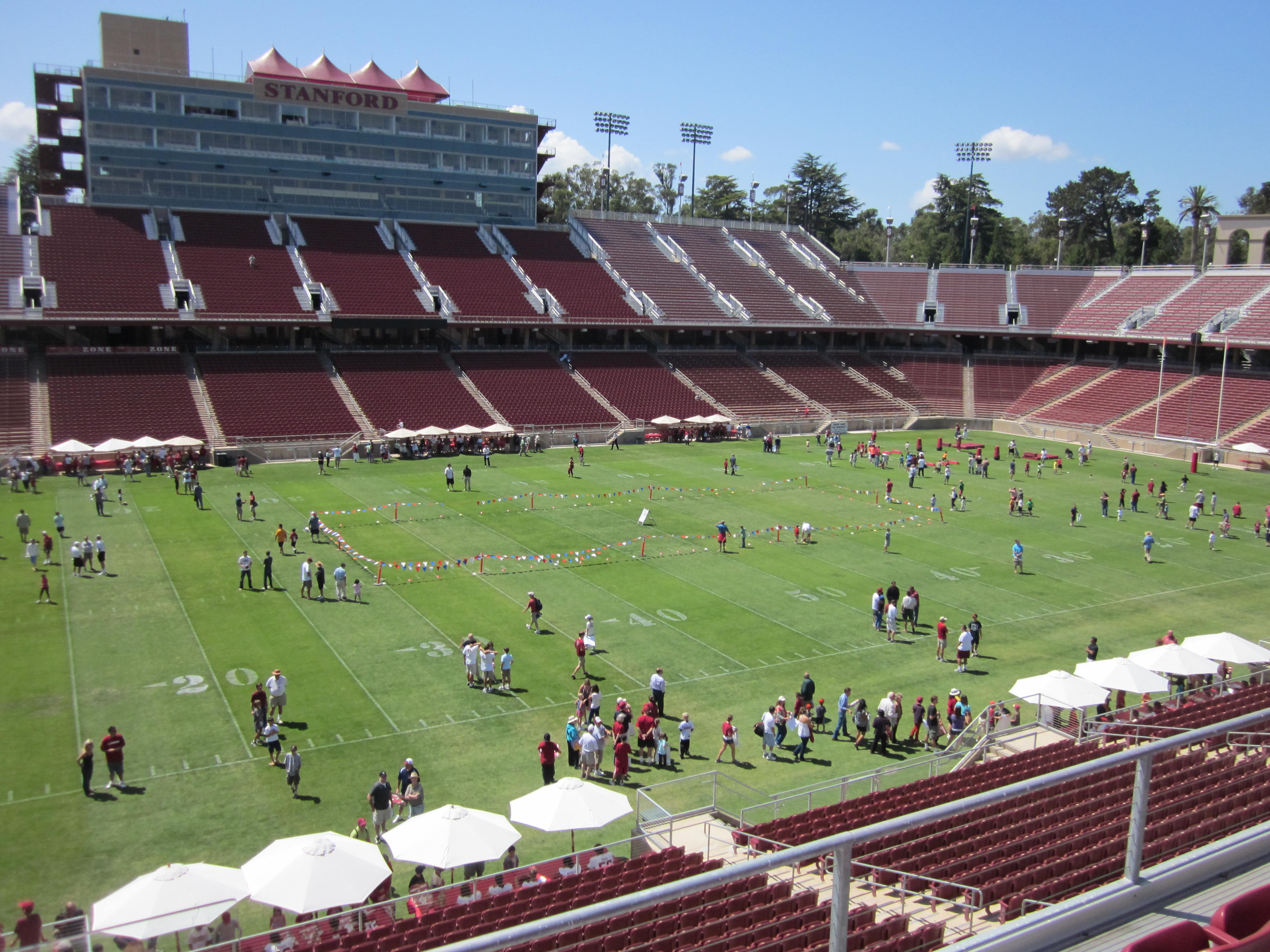
Stanford Stadium, home of the Stanford Cardinal football team

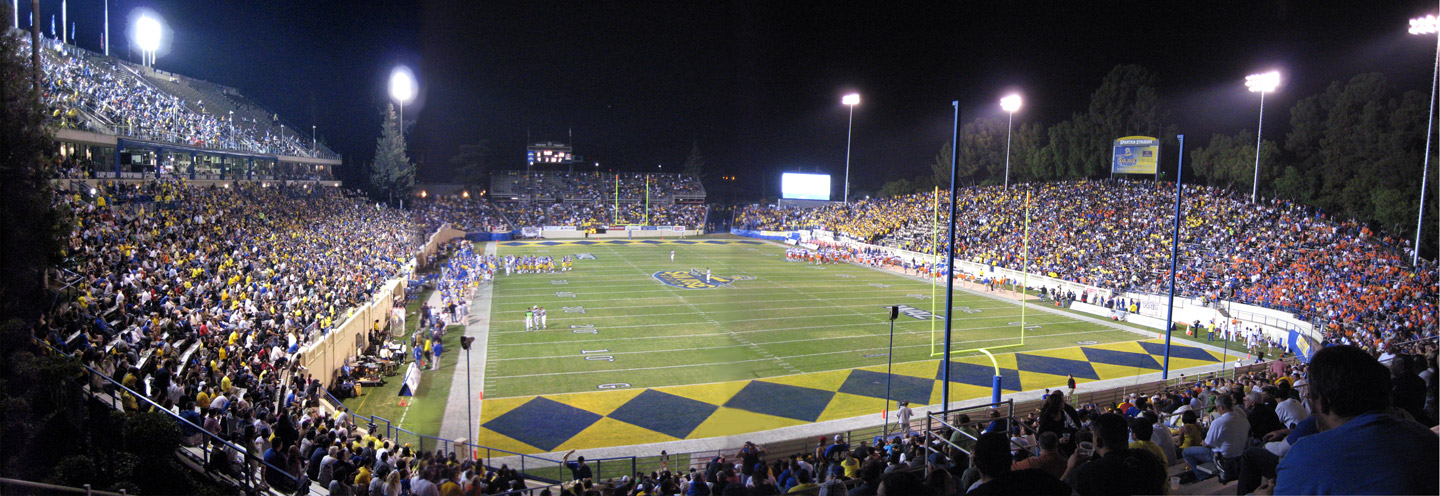
CEFCU Stadium, home of the San Jose State Spartans football team

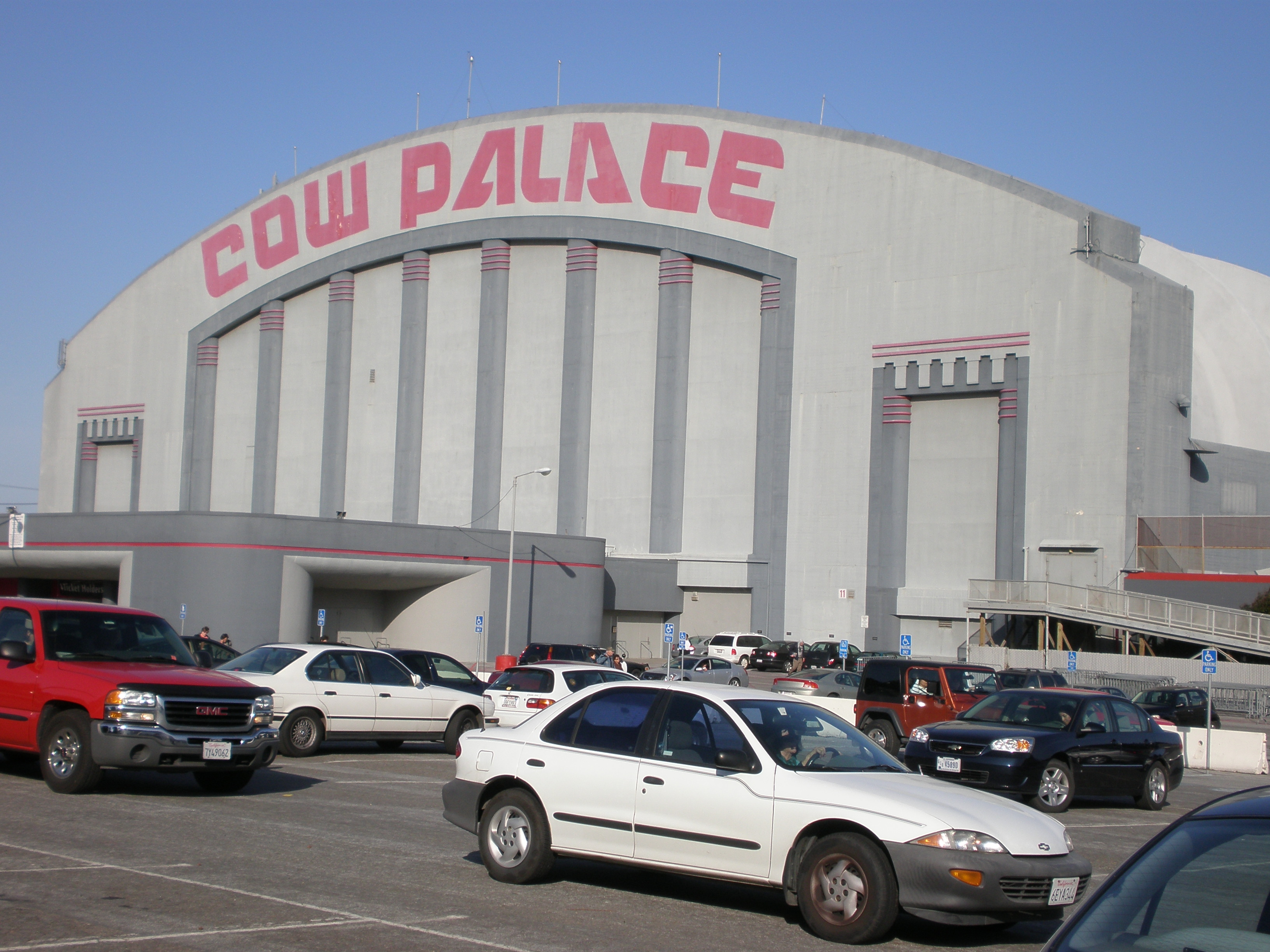
Cow Palace, home of the former San Francisco Bulls

== See also ==
- Sports in Los Angeles
- Sports in San Diego
