= Smrček =

- Municipality
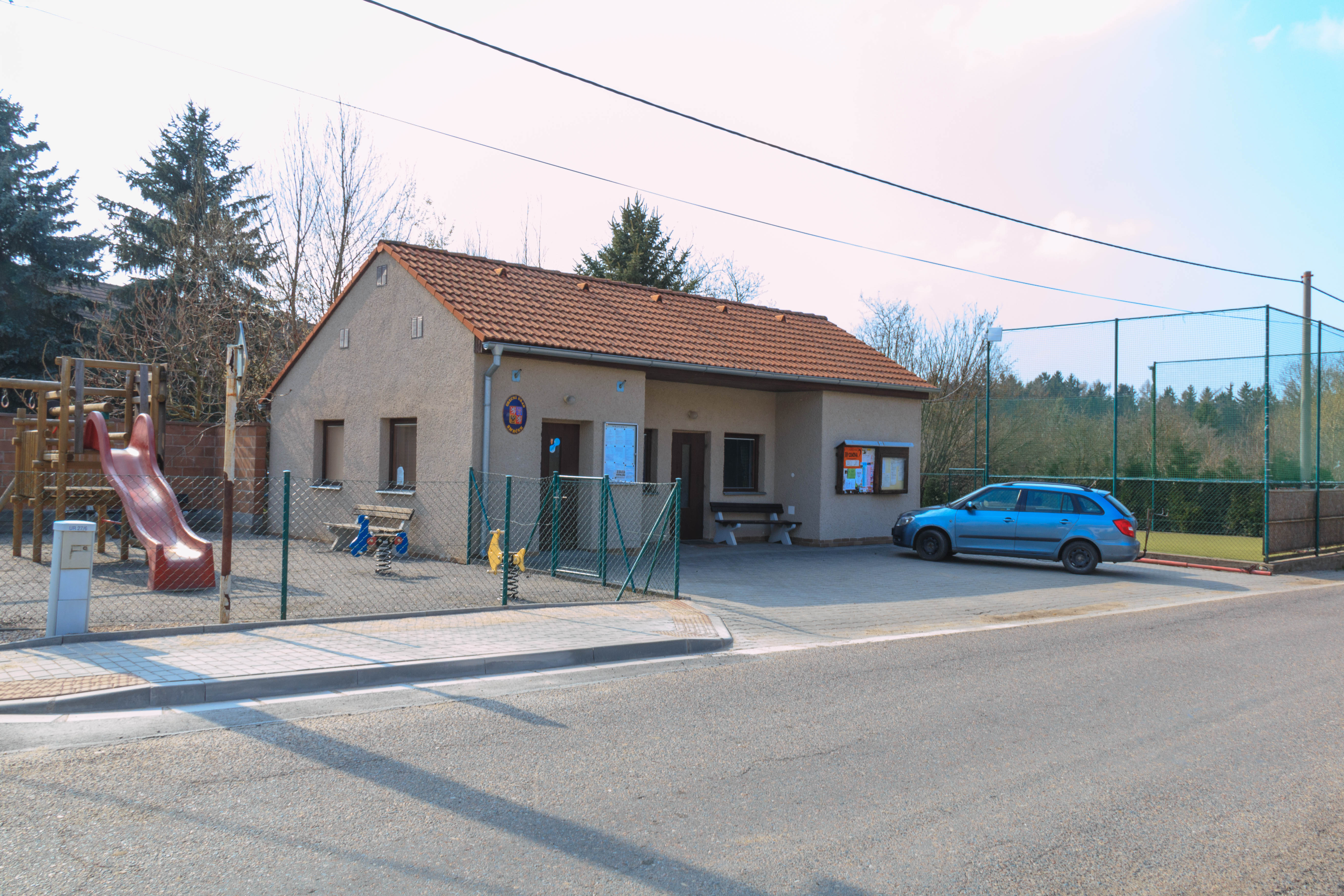
- Municipal office

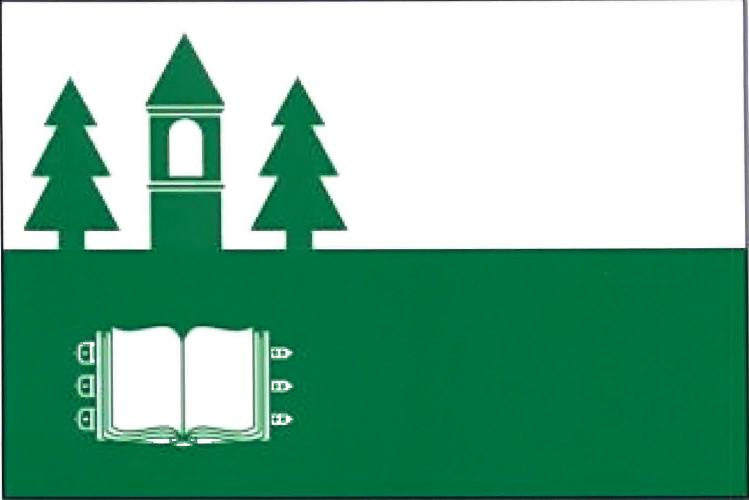
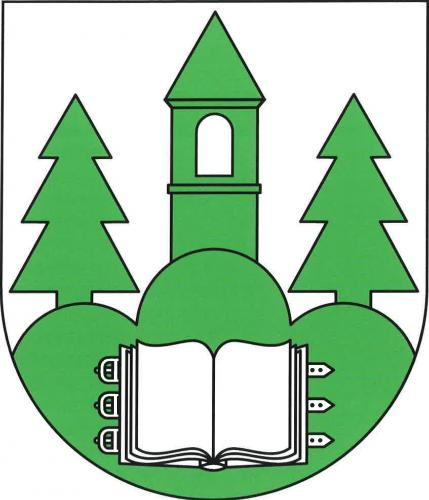
- Flag Coat of arms

- Location in the Czech Republic
- Coordinates: 49°52′6″N 15°53′36″E
- Country: Czech Republic
- Region: Pardubice
- District: Chrudim
- First mentioned: 1349

Area
  - Total: 4.71 km^{2} (1.82 sq mi)
- Elevation: 363 m (1,191 ft)

Population (2026-01-01)
  - Total: 136
  - Density: 28.9/km^{2} (74.8/sq mi)
- Time zone: UTC+1 (CET)
  - Summer (DST): UTC+2 (CEST)
- Postal code: 538 51
- Website: www.obecsmrcek.cz

Smrček is a municipality and village in Chrudim District in the Pardubice Region of the Czech Republic. It has about 100 inhabitants.

== Administrative division ==
Smrček consists of two municipal parts (in brackets population according to the 2021 census):

- Smrček (124)
- Smrček-Na Sádkách (7)

== Demographics ==
Historical population
Year	Pop.	±%
1869	218	—
1880	193	−11.5%
1890	195	+1.0%
1900	224	+14.9%
1910	207	−7.6%
1921	229	+10.6%
1930	233	+1.7%
1950	168	−27.9%
1961	220	+31.0%
1970	159	−27.7%
1980	145	−8.8%
1991	116	−20.0%
2001	118	+1.7%
2011	116	−1.7%
2021	131	+12.9%
Source: Censuses

== Notable people ==
- Libor Hájek (born 1998), ice hockey player
