= Tech CU Arena =

Multi-purpose arena in San Jose, California, United States

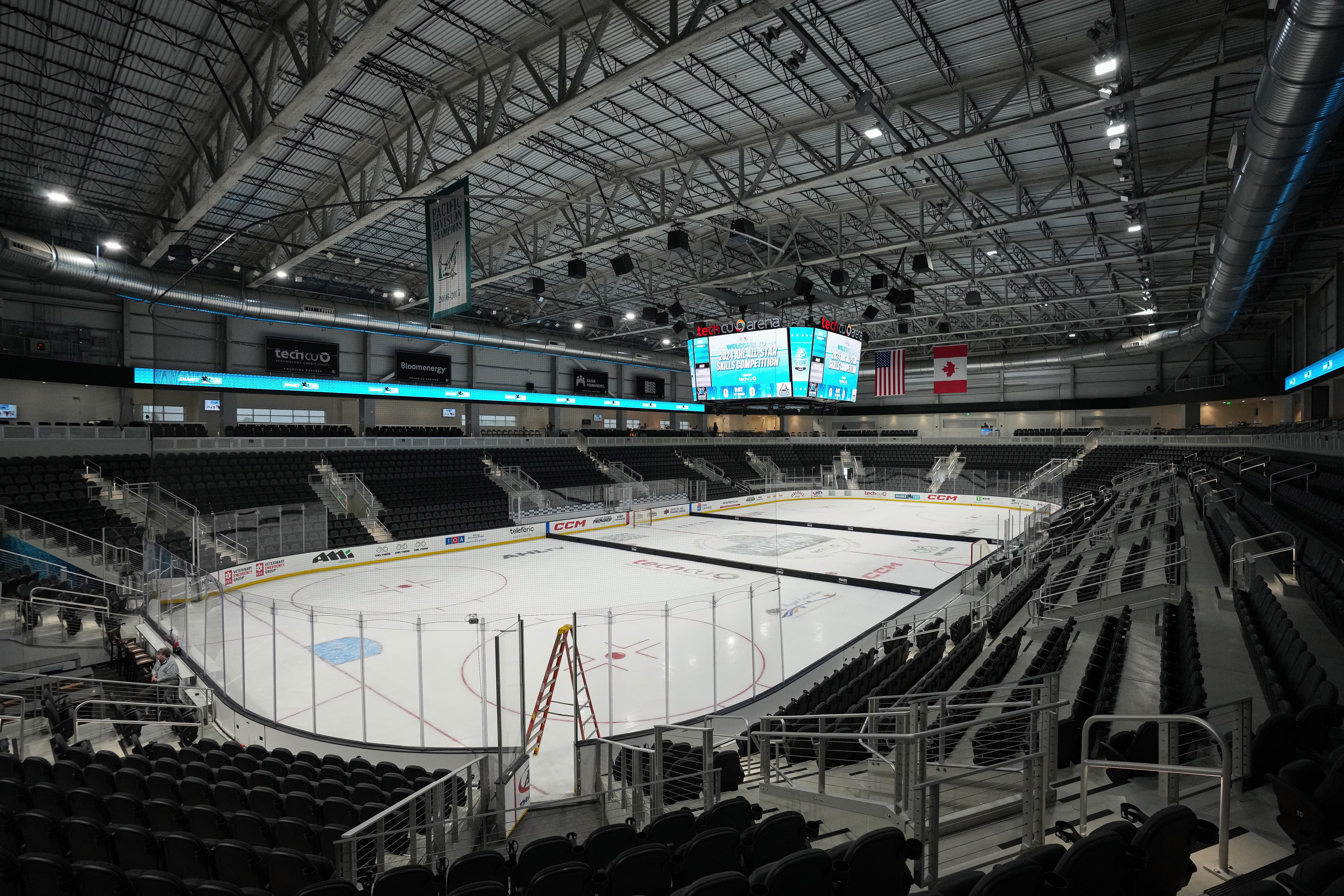
- Tech CU Arena in 2024
- Interactive map of Tech CU Arena
- Full name: Technology Credit Union Arena
- Former names: Barracuda Arena (planning/construction)
- Address: 1500 S 10th Street
- Location: San Jose, California
- Coordinates: 37°19′09.5″N 121°51′50.6″W
- Owner: Sharks Sports & Entertainment (SSE)
- Operator: Sharks Sports & Entertainment (SSE)
- Capacity: 4,329
- Executive suites: 12
- Public transit: VTA Bus: 73

Construction
- Groundbreaking: April 2020
- Opened: August 24, 2022

Tenants
- San Jose Barracuda (AHL) (2022–present); NorCal Rumble (MLV) (2027–present)

Website
- https://www.techcuarena.com/

Tech CU Arena is a multi-purpose arena in San Jose, California. It is the home of the San Jose Barracuda of the American Hockey League (AHL).

== Construction ==
In January 2020, the San Jose City Council voted unanimously to approve the 200,000 square-foot expansion of Sharks Ice San Jose, adding two additional recreational ice sheets to the facility, increasing the building's total ice sheets to six and doubling the facility's footprint to just under 400,000 square feet. The expansion made Sharks Ice at San Jose the largest ice facility in the United States at the time, and included a focus on green building initiatives including high efficiency LED lighting, electric Zamboni, and electric vehicle chargers. On March 15, 2022, Technology Credit Union took over the naming rights in a deal that would last until at least 2032.

The arena opened on August 24, 2022, with the first game on Saturday, October 8, 2022, an exhibition game against the Bakersfield Condors.

== 2024 AHL All Star Classic ==
On May 11, 2022, it was announced that the Tech CU Arena would host the 2024 AHL All Star Classic. The game took place on Monday, February 5, 2024.
