= San Jose Barracuda =

American Hockey League team in San Jose, California

- City: San Jose, California
- League: American Hockey League
- Conference: Western
- Division: Pacific
- Founded: 1996
- Home arena: Tech CU Arena
- Colors: Teal, orange, black, white
- Owners: San Jose Sports & Entertainment Enterprises (Hasso Plattner, Governor)
- General manager: Joe Will
- Head coach: John McCarthy
- Captain: Jimmy Huntington
- Media: San Jose Mercury News; CSN California; KDOW (1220 AM); AHL.TV (Internet)
- Affiliates: San Jose Sharks (NHL); Wichita Thunder (ECHL)

Franchise history
- 1996–2001: Kentucky Thoroughblades
- 2001–2006: Cleveland Barons
- 2006–2015: Worcester Sharks
- 2015–present: San Jose Barracuda

Championships
- Division titles: 1 (2016–17)

The San Jose Barracuda are a professional ice hockey team based in San Jose, California. They are the American Hockey League (AHL) affiliate of the National Hockey League (NHL)'s San Jose Sharks. The team has played its home games at Tech CU Arena since the 2022–23 season.

The Barracuda are a relocation of the former Worcester Sharks AHL franchise; it joined several other AHL franchises to form the AHL's Pacific Division in 2015.

== History ==
On January 29, 2015, the San Jose Sharks announced that they would be moving their AHL affiliate, the Worcester Sharks, to San Jose, California, as one of five charter members of the AHL's new Pacific Division. The team played at the SAP Center at San Jose, being one of two of the current AHL teams to share a home arena with its parent club (along with the Manitoba Moose sharing Bell MTS Place with their parent Winnipeg Jets).

On April 1, 2015, the Silicon Valley Business Journal reported that the Sharks had signed a multi-year presenting sponsorship with Barracuda Networks to be the AHL team's presenting sponsor; the team name would be the San Jose Barracuda and the reported team logo would feature the corporate logo in the background. Neither the Sharks nor Barracuda would comment, however, they stated that an official announcement would come later in the week. The name and logo were confirmed the next day in a joint press release. The team retained longtime AHL head coach Roy Sommer with the relocation.

Friday October 9, 2015 marked the first official game in Barracuda history. They took on the Rockford IceHogs at home, coming up on the losing end of a 4–2 score. Micheal Haley scored the first ever franchise goal while on a power play in the first period. The Barracuda picked up the first win in franchise history while visiting the Stockton Heat on October 15, 2015, by a score of 4–1.

On February 10, 2016, head coach Roy Sommer broke the record for most wins as an AHL coach, picking up his 637th win against the Ontario Reign by the score of 4–2.

The Barracuda finished the season 31–26–8–3. Its .527 winning percentage meant that it was matched up against the Ontario Reign during the Pacific Division semifinals. After splitting the first two games of the best-of-five series, the Barracuda came out on the losing end of game three by a 3–1 score, and also lost game four by a score of 4–1 to end their season. Bryan Lerg and Nikolay Goldobin led the team in goals with 21, while Ryan Carpenter had a team high 55 points. Goaltender Aaron Dell played a team high 40 games in net for the Barracuda, while winning 17 of them. The team's average attendance of 4,412 placed them 24th of 30 in the AHL.

The Barracuda's 2016–17 season would be more successful than its first season, winning 14 consecutive games from January 15 to March 1 and winning the Pacific Division and Western Conference. Goaltender Troy Grosenick won the "Baz" Bastien Award as the AHL's outstanding goaltender. The Barracuda made it to the Western Conference finals during the 2017 Calder Cup playoffs before being eliminated by the Grand Rapids Griffins four-games-to-one.

The Barracuda were the final team to make the playoffs in 2018, winning multiple games in a row. They were eliminated in the first round by the Tucson Roadrunners.

In 2018–19, the Barracuda led the AHL's Pacific Division for most of the first half of the season before the Bakersfield Condors went on a 17-game winning streak, and finished in second place in the division, four points behind the Condors. The Barracuda lost in the first round of the 2019 Calder Cup playoffs three games to one against the San Diego Gulls.

During the 2019–20 season, head coach Sommer was called up to the Sharks as an assistant after over 21 seasons as the Sharks' AHL affiliate head coach. The Sharks named Barracuda assistants Jimmy Bonneau and Michael Chiasson as co-coaches for Sommer's replacements. In January 2020, the city of San Jose approved of a proposed 4,200-seat arena to be built at the Sharks' Solar4America Ice complex that would be utilized by the Barracuda for home games and expected to be completed by 2022. The 2019–20 season then ended prematurely due to the restrictions caused by the COVID-19 pandemic.

Sommer returned to the Barracuda as head coach on September 22, 2020. The start of the 2020–21 season was postponed during the pandemic and Santa Clara County eventually barred all indoor and contact sporting events until at least February 2021. The AHL season schedule was announced to begin on February 5, causing the Barracuda to play its opening home games in Tucson against the Tucson Roadrunners before embarking on a seven-game road trip, as well as scheduling some games at Solar4America Ice due to the Sharks's home schedule at SAP Center.

On May 18, 2022, the Barracuda named development coach and former team captain John McCarthy as the second head coach in franchise history. Sommer moved to an advisory position.

Beginning the 2022–23 AHL season, the Barracuda moved to the TechCU Arena.

== Season-by-season records ==
Regular season											Playoffs					
Season	GP	W	L	OTL	SOL	Pts	PCT	GF	GA	Standing	Year	Prelims	1st round	2nd round	3rd round	Finals
2015–16	68	31	26	8	3	73	.537	198	193	4th, Pacific	2016	—	L, 1–3, ONT	—	—	—
2016–17	68	43	16	4	5	95	.699	232	176	1st, Pacific	2017	—	W, 3–2, STK	W, 4–1, SD	L, 1–4, GR	—
2017–18	68	34	26	4	4	76	.559	186	198	4th, Pacific	2018	—	L, 1–3, TUC	—	—	—
2018–19	68	39	22	3	4	85	.625	227	197	2nd, Pacific	2019	—	L, 1–3, SD	—	—	—
2019–20	55	21	27	5	2	49	.445	179	192	7th, Pacific	2020	Season cancelled due to the COVID-19 pandemic				
2020–21	36	15	15	4	2	36	.500	105	127	4th, Pacific	2021 (Note: The 2021 Calder Cup playoffs were not held; the Pacific Division held a postseason tournament for the division title. The bottom four teams had single-elimination play-in games to qualify for the semifinals (the first two rounds). The division semifinals and finals were best-of-three for the John D. Chick Trophy (the last two rounds).)	—	W, 2–1, TUC	W, 5–1, COL	L, 0–2, HSK	—
2021–22	68	20	42	4	2	46	.338	202	291	9th, Pacific	2022	Did not qualify				
2022–23	72	31	34	2	5	69	.479	205	249	8th, Pacific	2023	Did not qualify				
2023–24	72	24	34	10	4	62	.423	220	260	10th, Pacific	2024	Did not qualify				
2024–25	72	36	27	5	4	81	.563	244	231	6th, Pacific	2025	W, 2–0, ONT	L, 1–3, COL	—	—	—
2025–26	72	40	28	2	2	84	.583	243	230	6th, Pacific	2026	L, 0–2, HSK	—	—	—	—

== Mascot ==
Frenzy the Barracuda is the mascot for the San Jose Barracuda.

== Players ==
=== Current roster ===
Updated October 15, 2026.

No.	Nat	Player	Pos	S/G	Age	Acquired	Birthplace	Contract
64	(Canada)	Ryley Appelt	LW	L	26	2026	Edmonton, Alberta	Barracuda
16	(Canada)	Alex Barre-Boulet	C	L	29	2026	Montmagny, Quebec	Sharks
82	(Canada)	Jordan Bax	C	R	21	2026	Parkhill, Ontario	Barracuda
85	(United States)	Jake Boltmann	D	R	24	2026	Edina, Minnesota	Barracuda
18	(Sweden)	Filip Bystedt	C	L	22	2024	Linköping, Sweden	Sharks
56	(Canada)	Ethan Cardwell	RW	R	24	2023	Oshawa, Ontario	Sharks
1	(Canada)	Eric Comrie	G	L	31	2026	Edmonton, Alberta	Sharks
34	(Canada)	Matt Davis	G	R	25	2025	Calgary, Alberta	Barracuda
93	(United States)	Adam Eisele (PTO)	RW	R	25	2026	Lake Elmo, Minnesota	Barracuda
28	(Canada)	Tye Felhaber	LW	L	28	2026	Pembroke, Ontario	Sharks
26	(United States)	Andre Gasseau	C	L	23	2026	Garden Grove, California	Sharks
54	(United States)	Patrick Giles (A)	C	R	26	2025	Chevy Chase, Maryland	Sharks
24	(Canada)	Libor Hajek (A)	D	L	28	2026	Smrček, Czech Republic	Sharks
22	(Sweden)	Mattias Havelid	D	R	22	2025	Täby, Sweden	Sharks
75	(United States)	Brendan Hoffmann	C	R	25	2026	Charlotte, North Carolina	Barracuda
83	(Canada)	Donavan Houle	RW	R	26	2024	Montreal, Quebec	Barracuda
15	(Canada)	Jimmy Huntington (C)	C/LW	L	27	2025	Laval, Quebec	Sharks
59	(Canada)	Samuel Huo	C	R	25	2026	Richmond, British Columbia	Barracuda
36	(United States)	Kyle Keyser	G	L	27	2026	Coral Springs, Florida	Sharks
17	(Canada)	Brett Leason	RW	R	27	2026	Calgary, Alberta	Sharks
46	(United States)	Cam Lund	RW	R	22	2025	Bridgewater, Massachusetts	Sharks
67	(Canada)	Roland McKeown (A)	D	R	30	2026	Listowel, Ontario	Barracuda
79	(United States)	Thomas Messineo	D	R	24	2026	Westwood, Massachusetts	Barracuda
89	(Canada)	Wade Murphy (PTO)	RW	R	32	2026	Victoria, British Columbia	Barracuda
13	(United States)	Quentin Musty	LW	L	21	2025	Hamburg, New York	Sharks
48	(United States)	Eric Pohlkamp	D	R	22	2026	Brainerd, Minnesota	Sharks
72	(Sweden)	Leo Sahlin Wallenius	D	R	20	2026	Skövde, Sweden	Sharks
35	(Canada)	Ilya Samsonov	G	L	29	2026	Magnitogorsk, Russia	Sharks
53	(United States)	Phillip Sinn	D	L	22	2026	Mannheim, Germany	Sharks
76	(United States)	Anthony Vincent	W	R	29	2023	Wilton, Connecticut	Barracuda
62	(Canada)	Carson Wetsch	RW	R	20	2026	North Vancouver, British Columbia	Sharks

=== Team captains ===
- Bryan Lerg, 2015–16
- John McCarthy, 2016–20
- Jaycob Megna, 2021–22
- Andrew Agozzino, 2022–23
- Radim Simek, 2023–24
- Jimmy Schuldt, 2024–25
- Jimmy Huntington, 2026–present

=== American Hockey League Hall of Famers ===
AHL Hall of Fame Honored Members
Name	Seasons	Induction Year
Roy Sommer	2015-22 (head coach)	2024

== Team records ==
Records as of the end of the 2024–25 AHL regular season

Single season records
Goals: 30, Andrew Poturalski (2024–25)
Assists: 43, Andrew Poturalski (2024–25)
Points: 73, Andrew Poturalski (2024–25)
Penalty minutes: 192, Scott Sabourin (2023–24)
Wins: 30, Troy Grosenick (2016–17)
GAA: 2.04, Troy Grosenick (2016–17)
SV%: .926, Troy Grosenick (2016–17)
Shutouts: 10, Troy Grosenick (2016–17)

- Goaltending records need a minimum 25 games played by the goaltender

Single playoff records
Goals: 9, Ryan Carpenter (2016–17)
Assists: 8, Ryan Carpenter (2016–17)
Points: 17, Ryan Carpenter (2016–17)
Penalty minutes: 41, Timo Meier (2016–17)
