= Býšovec =

- Municipality
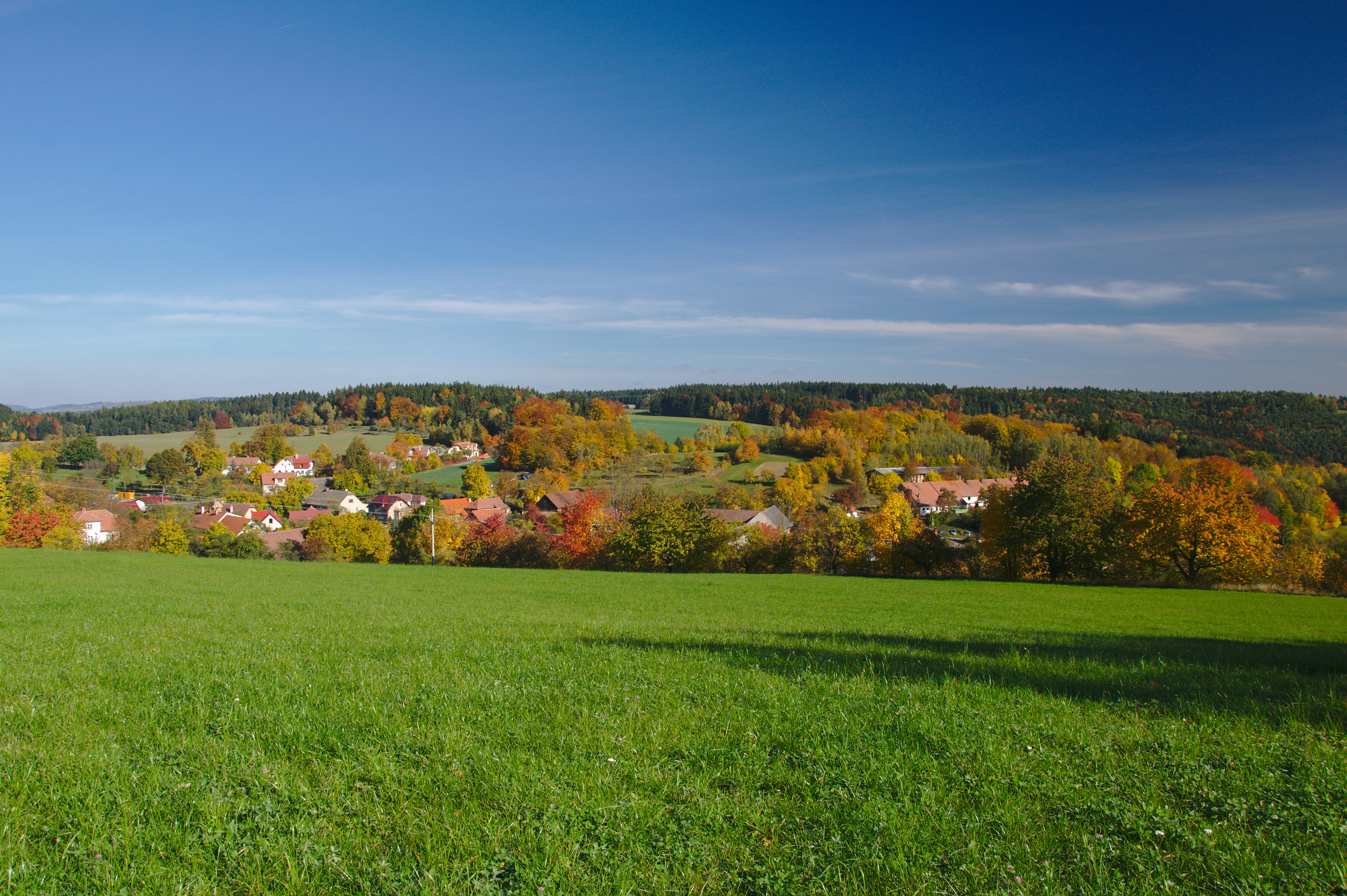
- General view

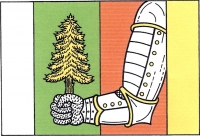
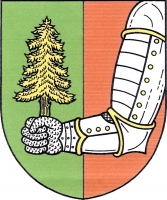
- Flag Coat of arms

- Location in the Czech Republic
- Coordinates: 49°28′31″N 16°17′22″E
- Country: Czech Republic
- Region: Vysočina
- District: Žďár nad Sázavou
- First mentioned: 1350

Area
  - Total: 5.81 km^{2} (2.24 sq mi)
- Elevation: 584 m (1,916 ft)

Population (2026-01-01)
  - Total: 171
  - Density: 29.4/km^{2} (76.2/sq mi)
- Time zone: UTC+1 (CET)
  - Summer (DST): UTC+2 (CEST)
- Postal codes: 592 62, 593 01
- Website: www.bysovec.cz

Býšovec is a municipality and village in Žďár nad Sázavou District in the Vysočina Region of the Czech Republic. It has about 200 inhabitants.

Býšovec lies approximately 28 kilometres (17 mi) east of Žďár nad Sázavou, 52 kilometres (32 mi) east of Jihlava, and 151 kilometres (94 mi) south-east of Prague.

== Administrative division ==
Býšovec consists of two municipal parts (in brackets population according to the 2021 census):

- Býšovec (90)
- Smrček (72)

== Demographics ==
Historical population
Year	Pop.	±%
1869	302	—
1880	311	+3.0%
1890	316	+1.6%
1900	307	−2.8%
1910	330	+7.5%
1921	336	+1.8%
1930	300	−10.7%
1950	194	−35.3%
1961	197	+1.5%
1970	180	−8.6%
1980	174	−3.3%
1991	148	−14.9%
2001	140	−5.4%
2011	134	−4.3%
2021	162	+20.9%
Source: Censuses

== Notable people ==
- Libor Hájek (born 1998), ice hockey player
