= Libor Hájek =

Czech ice hockey player (born 1998)

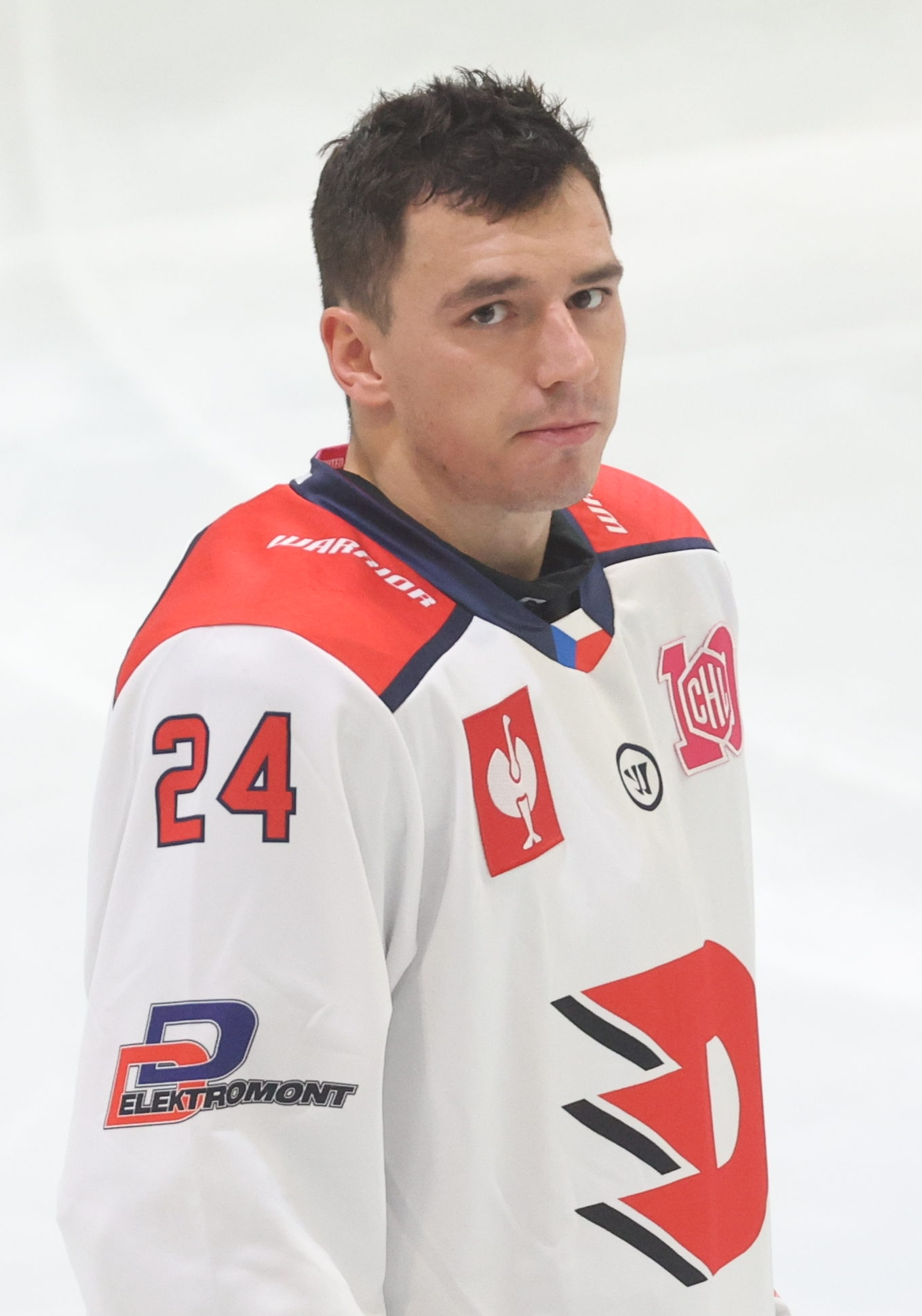
- Hájek in 2024
- Born: 4 February 1998 (age 28) Smrček, Czech Republic
- Height: 6 ft 2 in (188 cm)
- Weight: 209 lb (95 kg; 14 st 13 lb)
- Position: Defence
- Shoots: Left
- NHL team (P) Cur. team Former teams: San Jose Sharks; San Jose Barracuda (AHL); HC Kometa Brno; New York Rangers; HC Dynamo Pardubice
- National team: Czech Republic
- NHL draft: 37th overall, 2016; Tampa Bay Lightning
- Playing career: 2015–present

Libor Hájek (born 4 February 1998) is a Czech professional ice hockey player who is a defenceman for the San Jose Barracuda of the American Hockey League (AHL) while under contract to the San Jose Sharks of the National Hockey League (NHL). He was selected by the Tampa Bay Lightning, in the second round, 37th overall, in the 2016 NHL entry draft.

== Playing career ==
Hájek made his Czech Extraliga (ELH) debut playing 17 games with HC Kometa Brno during the 2014–15 Czech Extraliga season. In opting to continue his development in the CHL, Hájek was selected second overall in the 2015 CHL Import Draft by the Saskatoon Blades of the WHL.

At the completion of his second season with the Blades, Hájek was signed to a three-year, entry-level contract with the Tampa Bay Lightning on 21 March 2017. He immediately joined the primary affiliate, the Syracuse Crunch of the AHL on an amateur try-out to play out the remainder of the 2016–17 season.

On 26 February 2018, Hájek was traded to the New York Rangers, along with Vladislav Namestnikov, Brett Howden, and two draft picks, for Ryan McDonagh and J. T. Miller. Hájek recorded his first career NHL assist off a goal by Mika Zibanejad during the 2019–20 season opener against the Winnipeg Jets on 3 October.

On 13 November 2020, Hájek was loaned to HC Kometa Brno of the Czech Extraliga (ELH).

On 7 September 2021, the Rangers re-signed Hájek to a one-year contract. On 12 July 2022, he was signed to a one-year contract extension. He spent most of the 2022–23 season with the Rangers but was assigned to Hartford on 10 February 2023.

Hájek left the Rangers organization after five seasons and was later signed as a free agent to a professional tryout deal with the Pittsburgh Penguins on 30 August 2023. After attending training camp, he was reassigned to continue his trial with AHL affiliate, the Wilkes-Barre/Scranton Penguins. He was later signed to a one-year AHL contract with Wilkes-Barre to open the 2023–24 season on 17 October 2023.

Hájek was scoreless through 11 regular season appearances with Wilkes-Barre/Scranton before he was mutually released from his contract in order to return to his native Czech Republic and sign a long term five-year contract with HC Dynamo Pardubice of the ELH on 15 December 2023.

He signed a one-year, two-way contract in a return to the NHL with the San Jose Sharks for the 2026–27 season on 8 July 2026.

== International play ==
Medal record

Representing Czech Republic

Ice hockey

World Championships
Gold medal – first place	2024 Czech Republic	

Hájek represented Czechia at the 2024 IIHF World Championship and won a gold medal.

== Career statistics ==
=== Regular season and playoffs ===
			Regular season					Playoffs
Season	Team	League	GP	G	A	Pts	PIM	GP	G	A	Pts	PIM
2012–13	HC Kometa Brno	CZE U18	43	1	3	4	57	3	0	1	1	0
2013–14	HC Kometa Brno	CZE U18	32	4	14	18	24	10	0	7	7	8
2013–14	HC Kometa Brno	CZE U20	13	0	1	1	10	—	—	—	—	—
2014–15	HC Kometa Brno	CZE U18	2	1	2	3	4	—	—	—	—	—
2014–15	HC Kometa Brno	CZE U20	44	1	9	10	62	1	0	0	0	0
2014–15	HC Kometa Brno	ELH	17	0	1	1	2	7	0	0	0	0
2015–16	Saskatoon Blades	WHL	69	3	23	26	76	—	—	—	—	—
2016–17	Saskatoon Blades	WHL	65	4	22	26	81	—	—	—	—	—
2016–17	Syracuse Crunch	AHL	8	1	0	1	4	—	—	—	—	—
2017–18	Saskatoon Blades	WHL	33	8	17	25	26	—	—	—	—	—
2017–18	Regina Pats	WHL	25	4	10	14	4	4	1	0	1	12
2018–19	Hartford Wolf Pack	AHL	58	0	5	5	36	—	—	—	—	—
2018–19	New York Rangers	NHL	5	1	0	1	6	—	—	—	—	—
2019–20	New York Rangers	NHL	28	0	5	5	12	—	—	—	—	—
2019–20	Hartford Wolf Pack	AHL	23	1	2	3	14	—	—	—	—	—
2020–21	HC Kometa Brno	ELH	10	0	2	2	4	—	—	—	—	—
2020–21	New York Rangers	NHL	44	2	2	4	10	—	—	—	—	—
2021–22	Hartford Wolf Pack	AHL	5	0	2	2	6	—	—	—	—	—
2021–22	New York Rangers	NHL	17	0	1	1	8	—	—	—	—	—
2022–23	Hartford Wolf Pack	AHL	24	2	4	6	31	5	0	1	1	6
2022–23	New York Rangers	NHL	16	1	0	1	4	—	—	—	—	—
2023–24	Wilkes-Barre/Scranton Penguins	AHL	11	0	0	0	14	—	—	—	—	—
2023–24	HC Dynamo Pardubice	ELH	20	4	5	9	12	16	0	3	3	10
2024–25	HC Dynamo Pardubice	ELH	47	3	7	10	41	16	3	5	8	14
2025–26	HC Dynamo Pardubice	ELH	44	6	7	13	41	17	0	3	3	6
NHL totals			110	4	8	12	40	—	—	—	—	—
ELH totals			138	13	22	35	76	56	3	11	14	30

=== International ===
Year	Team	Event	Result	GP	G	A	Pts	PIM
2014	Czech Republic	U17	7th	5	0	1	1	4
2014	Czech Republic	IH18	2nd place, silver medalist(s)	5	0	1	1	4
2015	Czech Republic	U18	6th	5	1	0	1	4
2015	Czech Republic	IH18	6th	4	0	1	1	4
2016	Czech Republic	U18	7th	5	0	2	2	6
2018	Czech Republic	WJC	4th	7	1	7	8	6
2021	Czech Republic	WC	7th	8	1	2	3	2
2024	Czechia	WC	1st place, gold medalist(s)	10	1	1	2	6
2025	Czechia	WC	6th	8	0	1	1	2
2026	Czechia	WC	5th	8	0	0	0	0
Junior totals				31	2	12	14	28
Senior totals				34	2	4	6	10
