= Technology Credit Union =

American credit union

Tech CU (Technology Credit Union)
- Type: Credit union
- Industry: Financial services
- Founded: 1960; 66 years ago
- Headquarters: San Jose, California, United States
- Area served: Bay Area
- Owners: Its members
- Website: www.techcu.com

Tech CU (Technology Credit Union) is an American credit union that is based in the Bay Area, California. Tech CU provides banking services, such as checking accounts, savings accounts, investment services, loans and business banking solutions to its members.

== History ==
Tech CU was founded in 1960 by a group of employees from Fairchild Camera and Instrument Corp.

As of 2023, Tech CU has more than $4.8 billion in assets and ten full-service branches. It provides financial products and services to more than 169,000 members. In January 2015, the company acquired Sunnyvale Federal Credit Union. In July 2015, Tech CU opened its first branch in San Francisco at 1453 Mission Street.

In 2022, Sharks Sports & Entertainment (SSE), the parent company of the San Jose Sharks of the National Hockey League and the San Jose Barracuda of the American Hockey League, announced a 10-year naming rights agreement with Tech CU for its new arena. The arena, home to the San Jose Barracuda, is now known as Tech CU Arena.

In 2024, Tech CU opened a new location in Austin, Texas. Additionally, the institution launched a Virtual Branch to extend its accessibility to members across different regions.

== Membership ==
Anyone who lives, works, worships, or attends school in Santa Clara, San Mateo, Alameda, Contra Costa, Santa Cruz, San Francisco, Marin, Napa, Solano, Sonoma, Los Angeles, Orange, San Diego, Sacramento, and San Joaquin counties in California can become a member of Tech CU, as can anyone living or working in Canyon or Ada Counties in Idaho.

Membership can also be achieved by the following;

- Employees of Tech CU member companies anywhere in the United States
- Relatives of current Tech CU members
- Members of Tech CU's affiliated organizations
- Employees and employers of public or private technology-based entities with a location in California.

== Affiliated Organizations ==
Tech CU is affiliated with several different organizations. They include;

- The Financial Fitness Association
- The Northern California Human Resource Association (NCHRA)
- The San Jose State University Alumni Association (SJSUAA)

== Community involvement ==
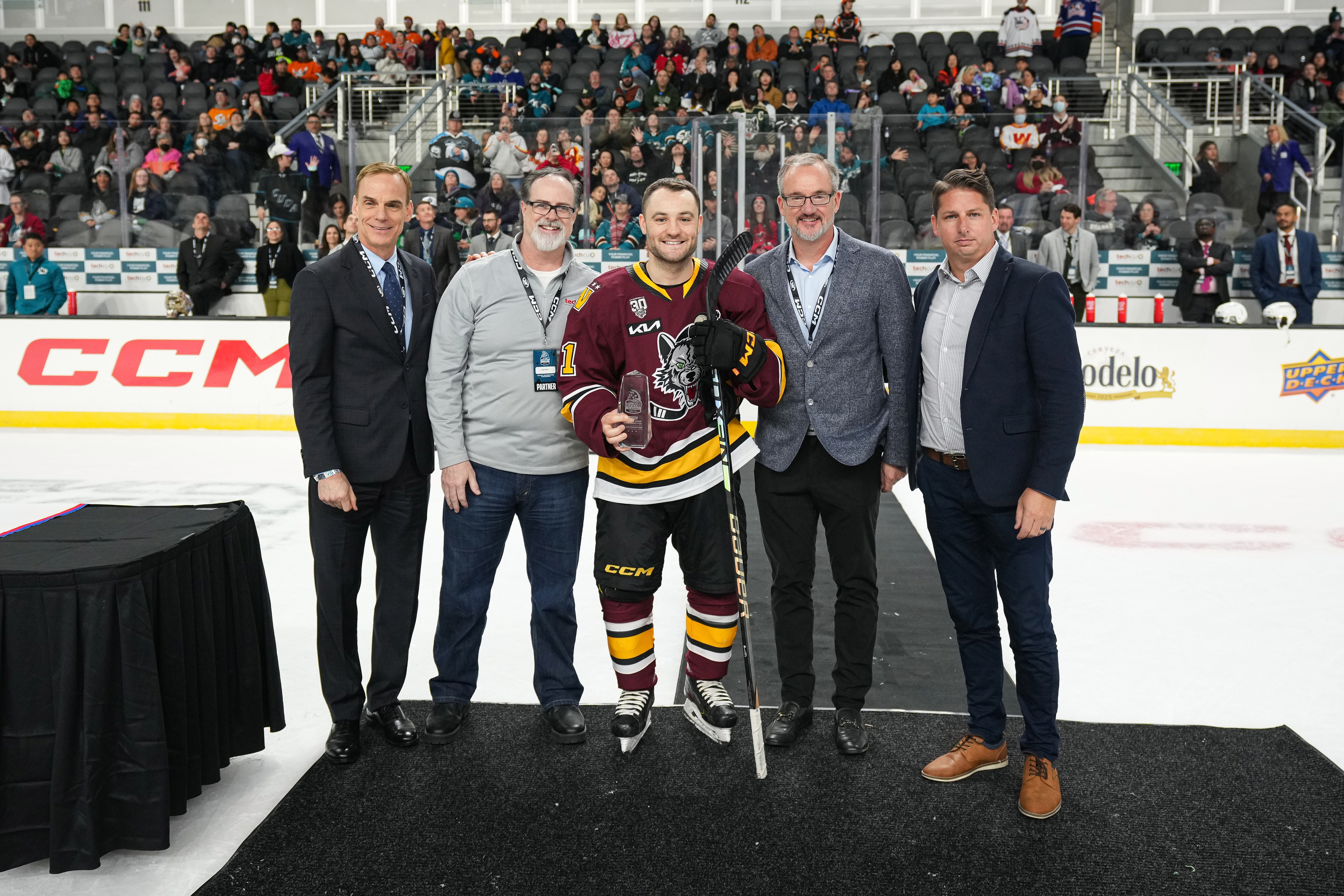
Tech CU CEO Todd Harris (second from left) presenting an award to Ethen Frank at the 2024 AHL All Star Challenge

Tech CU has a community relations program which focuses on continued support of non-profit organizations in the areas of STEAM Education and Workforce Development, Financial Literacy, Affordable Housing, and Health and Wellness.

== Awards ==
Tech CU has won a number of awards including the Communicator Awards, Stevie Awards, Hermes Creative Awards, CUNA Diamond Awards, AVA Digital Awards, S&P Global Market Intelligence, Marcom Awards, and the Credit Union Journal Best Practices Awards, among others.
