= 2000–01 USHL season =

- League: United States Hockey League
- Sport: Ice hockey
- Duration: Regular season September 2000 – March 2001; Postseason; March 30 – April 28, 2001
- Games: 56, 24
- Teams: 13

Regular season
- Anderson Cup: Lincoln Stars
- Season MVP: Chris Fournier (Lincoln Stars)
- Top scorer: Chris Fournier (Lincoln Stars)

Playoffs
- Playoffs MVP: Ray Fraser (Lancers)
- Finals champions: Omaha Lancers
- Runners-up: Lincoln Stars

USHL seasons
- ← 1999–2000 2001–02 →

The 2000–01 USHL season was the 22nd season of the United States Hockey League as an all-junior league. The regular season began in September 2000 and concluded in March 2001. The Omaha Lancers won the Anderson Cup as regular season champions. The Omaha Lancers defeated the Lincoln Stars 3 games to 2 for the Clark Cup.

== Member changes ==
- The Thunder Bay Flyers folded.
- The Fargo-Moorhead Ice Sharks relocated and became the Chicago Steel while the Twin City Vulcans relocated and became the Tri-City Storm.
- The USNTDP dropped from being a full member to an affiliate, playing a partial schedule.

== Regular season ==
Final standings

Note: GP = Games played; W = Wins; L = Losses; OTL = Overtime losses; GF = Goals for; GA = Goals against; PTS = Points; x = clinched playoff berth; y = clinched division title; z = clinched league title

=== Eastern Conference ===
Team	GP	W	L	OTL	Pts	GF	GA
xy – Green Bay Gamblers	56	32	13	11	75	177	153
x – Cedar Rapids RoughRiders	56	30	21	5	65	192	196
Waterloo Black Hawks	56	25	29	2	52	189	210
Chicago Steel	56	21	30	5	47	182	232
Dubuque Fighting Saints	56	15	37	4	34	148	219
Rochester Mustangs	56	11	42	3	25	113	239

=== Western Conference ===
Team	GP	W	L	OTL	Pts	GF	GA
xyz – Lincoln Stars	56	43	7	6	92	246	143
x – Sioux Falls Stampede	56	40	14	2	82	267	182
x – Omaha Lancers	56	35	15	6	76	215	145
x – Des Moines Buccaneers	56	32	21	3	67	195	190
x – Tri-City Storm	56	27	21	8	62	191	179
x – Sioux City Musketeers	56	27	22	7	61	174	194

=== USNTDP ===
Team	GP	W	L	OTL	Pts	GF	GA
USNTDP	24	10	8	6	26	74	81

Note: The USNTDP played two games against each of the full league members.

=== Statistics ===
==== Scoring leaders ====
The following players led the league in regular season points at the completion of all regular season games.

Player	Team	GP	G	A	Pts	PIM
Chris Fournier	Lincoln Stars	55	26	57	83	32
Brandon Bochenski	Lincoln Stars	55	47	33	80	22
Mike Doyle	Sioux Falls Stampede	56	32	46	78	52
James Massen	Sioux Falls Stampede	56	37	38	75	56
Jamie Mattie	Sioux Falls Stampede	49	12	53	65	53
Riley Riddell	Omaha Lancers	56	30	34	64	16
Dave Iannazzo	Sioux Falls Stampede	54	24	38	62	38
Ryan Connelly	Waterloo Black Hawks	56	23	36	59	139
Konrad Reeder	Tri-City Storm	54	34	24	58	77
Cory McLean	Chicago Steel	56	24	34	58	27

==== Leading goaltenders ====
Note: GP = Games played; Mins = Minutes played; W = Wins; L = Losses; OTL = Overtime losses; SO = Shutouts; GAA = Goals against average; SV% = Save percentage

Player	Team	GP	Mins	W	L	OTL	SO	GA	SV	SV%	GAA
Marty Magers	Omaha Lancers	27	1502	16	5	3	3	58	587	.910	2.32
Justin Johnson	Lincoln Stars	24	1380	18	3	2	2	54	559	.912	2.35
Jure Penko	Green Bay Gamblers	46	2711	28	8	10	4	108	1,143	.914	2.39
Ray Fraser	Omaha Lancers	34	1862	19	10	3	5	75	746	.909	2.42
Beau Fritz	Lincoln Stars	25	1453	19	3	2	4	59	634	.915	2.44

== Clark Cup playoffs ==
The regular season division champions received the top two seeds.
Teams were reseeded after the quarterfinal round.

Quarterfinal (Best-of-5)
W1	Lincoln Stars	4	6	6	-	-
8	Sioux City Musketeers	0	1	5	-	-
E1	Green Bay Gamblers	2	4	3	0	-
7	Tri-City Storm	3*	0	5	3	-
3	Sioux Falls Stampede	10	1	7	6	-
6	Cedar Rapids RoughRiders	1	5	3	2	-
4	Omaha Lancers	4	5	7	-	-
5	Des Moines Buccaneers	1	2	0	-	-

Semifinal (Best-of-5)
W1	Lincoln Stars	4*	5	5	-	-
7	Tri-City Storm	3	2	2	-	-
3	Sioux Falls Stampede	2	3	8	0	-
4	Omaha Lancers	3	6	3	8	-

Championship (Best-of-5)
W1	Lincoln Stars	6	2	4	3	1
4	Omaha Lancers	1	6	3	4	4

Note: * denotes overtime period(s)

== Awards ==
Award	Recipient	Team
Player of the Year	Chris Fournier	Lincoln Stars
Forward of the Year	Chris Fournier	Lincoln Stars
Defenseman of the Year	Jamie Mattie	Sioux Falls Stampede
Goaltender of the Year	Jure Penko	Green Bay Gamblers
Rookie of the Year	Brandon Bochenski	Lincoln Stars
Coach of the Year	Steve Johnson	Lincoln Stars
General Manager of the Year	Steve Johnson	Lincoln Stars
