= Sacred Heart Old Collegians Football Club =

Sacred Heart Old Collegians

Names
- Full name: Sacred Heart Old Collegians Football Club
- Nickname(s): SHOC, Hearts

2026 (Division 1) season
- Home-and-away season: 9th

Club details
- Founded: 1968; 58 years ago
- Colours: Blue Sky blue
- Competition: Adelaide Footy League
- Premierships: 3 (1974, 1993, 2001)
- Grounds: Marcellin War Memorial Oval, Somerton Park
- Champagnat Oval, Mitchell Park
- Former ground: Pennington Reserve, Pennington

The Sacred Heart Old Collegians Football Club, commonly known as SHOC or SHOCs, is an Australian rules football club based in Somerton Park, South Australia. The club represents former students of Sacred Heart College and currently competes in the Adelaide Footy League. Founded in 1968, SHOC has a long history in South Australian amateur football and has competed predominantly in the upper divisions of the competition.

== History ==
The origins of Sacred Heart Old Collegians football can be traced to the early twentieth century, when Marist Brothers old boys formed football teams. A Marist Brothers Old Boys team played at Victoria Park Racecourse in 1917, providing an early connection between Sacred Heart's old collegians and organised football.

During the 1960s, the Sacred Heart Old Collegians Association discussed the possibility of establishing its own football club. At the time, a number of Sacred Heart old scholars were playing for the Christian Brothers Old Collegians Football Club. The acquisition of Pennington Reserve provided the opportunity to establish a separate Sacred Heart team.

The Sacred Heart Old Collegians Football Club was officially established in 1968. The club entered the South Australian Amateur Football League in Division 4 and began building a strong football program based around former Sacred Heart students.

Under the guidance of coach and president Roger Orchard, SHOC progressed rapidly through the divisions during the 1970s. The club reached Division 3 in 1975 and Division 2 in 1978 before eventually reaching Division 1 in 1984.

In 1974, SHOC won its first A Grade premiership. The Hearts defeated Rostrevor Old Collegians in the A4 grand final, providing the club with its first senior premiership only six years after its establishment.

The club continued to progress through the amateur football divisions and reached Division 1 in 1984. SHOC remained predominantly in Division 1 and Division 2 for much of the following decades, establishing itself as one of South Australia's stronger old scholars clubs.

In 1993, former Norwood player Duncan Fosdike coached Sacred Heart Old Collegians to the A2 South Australian Amateur Football League premiership.

The club experienced periods in different divisions during the late 1990s and early 2000s, including a brief period in Division 3 in 2001. SHOC subsequently returned to the higher divisions and continued to maintain a strong senior program.

During the 2000s, SHOC continued to field multiple senior teams and develop players through its lower grades. The club's B Grade and lower-grade sides achieved considerable success, helping maintain the strength of the overall football program.

The 2010s were another successful period for the club. In 2011, SHOC won the Division 1 A Grade premiership, defeating the leading teams in the competition to claim the flag. The club also won the Division 1 B Grade premiership in the same period.

In 2014, the SHOC A Grade team again enjoyed a successful season, including a notable comeback victory against Gaza. The club continued to maintain a strong connection with Sacred Heart College and its old scholars community.

In 2016, the football club won two premiership flags, with the Under 18 and B Grade teams both claiming premierships. The achievement demonstrated the depth of the club's football program.

SHOC celebrated its 50th anniversary in 2018. The club held a major anniversary function at Morphettville Racecourse attended by more than 400 people, bringing together current players, former players and members of the Sacred Heart community.

The club's senior football program continued to compete in the Adelaide Footy League's higher divisions. In 2018, SHOC finished sixth in Division 2, while its reserves finished as runners-up and the club continued to field lower-grade teams.

Following the disruptions caused by the COVID-19 pandemic, SHOC continued to rebuild its senior football program. The club eventually returned to Division 1, where it has remained a competitive side.

In 2023, SHOC returned to Division 1 of the Adelaide Footy League. The club entered its third consecutive Division 1 season in 2025 and fielded four senior men's teams.

The 2025 season saw the club maintain a strong playing group, with a player retention rate of more than 90 per cent. The club also welcomed 25 new or returning players while continuing to operate four senior men's teams.

== Premierships ==
- South Australian Amateur FL (3)
  - 1974 (A4), 1993 (A3), 2001 (D3)

== Club colours and nickname ==
Sacred Heart Old Collegians traditionally wears blue and sky blue. The two colours form the club's distinctive playing identity and are used across its football uniforms and club branding.

The club is commonly known as SHOC or SHOCs, an abbreviation of Sacred Heart Old Collegians. The club is closely associated with Sacred Heart College and its old scholars community.

== Home ground ==
SHOC Football Club's current home ground is split between games at Sacred Heart College Marcellin Campus in Somerton Park and Sacred Heart College Champagnat Campus in Mitchell Park. The club has also played home matches at a number of grounds during its history, including Pennington Reserve during its early years.

The acquisition of Pennington Reserve in the 1960s was particularly important to the establishment of the football club, as it provided the Sacred Heart Old Collegians Association with a suitable ground on which to establish its own football team.

== Notable players ==
=== SANFL players ===
A number of players and coaches with SANFL experience have been associated with Sacred Heart Old Collegians.

- Duncan Fosdike – former Norwood player who later coached Sacred Heart Old Collegians to the 1993 A2 premiership.
- John Hillman – former Norwood player who later coached Sacred Heart Old Collegians.

=== Notable players ===
- Roger Orchard – founding coach and president who played a major role in the club's rise through the amateur football divisions during the 1970s and early 1980s.
- Neil O'Dea – record holder for games played for Sacred Heart Old Collegians, having played 440 games for the club.

== Milestones ==
Sacred Heart Old Collegians celebrated its 50th anniversary in 2018, marking five decades since the club was established in 1968.

Neil O'Dea is the club's record games holder, having played 440 games for SHOC. His playing career represents one of the strongest examples of the club's long-term connection with its players and old scholars.

The club's 1974 A Grade premiership was a particularly significant milestone, as it was SHOC's first senior premiership only six years after the football club was established.

== See also ==
- Adelaide Footy League
- Sacred Heart College, Adelaide
- Sacred Heart Old Collegians
- Rostrevor Old Collegians Football Club
- Norwood Football Club
- South Australian Amateur Football League
