= John Hillman =

John Hillman may refer to:

- Jack Hillman (1871–1952), English footballer
- Jack Charles Hillman (1893–1977), Canadian politician
- John Eric Hillman known as Eric Hillman (born 1966), American baseball player
- John R. Hillman (born 1963), American structural engineer
- John Wesley Hillman (1832–1915), American prospector and explorer
- John Hillman (ice hockey), see List of USHL players drafted by NHL teams

== See also ==
- Jack Hillman (disambiguation)
