= Mike Sillinger =

Canadian ice hockey player (born 1971)

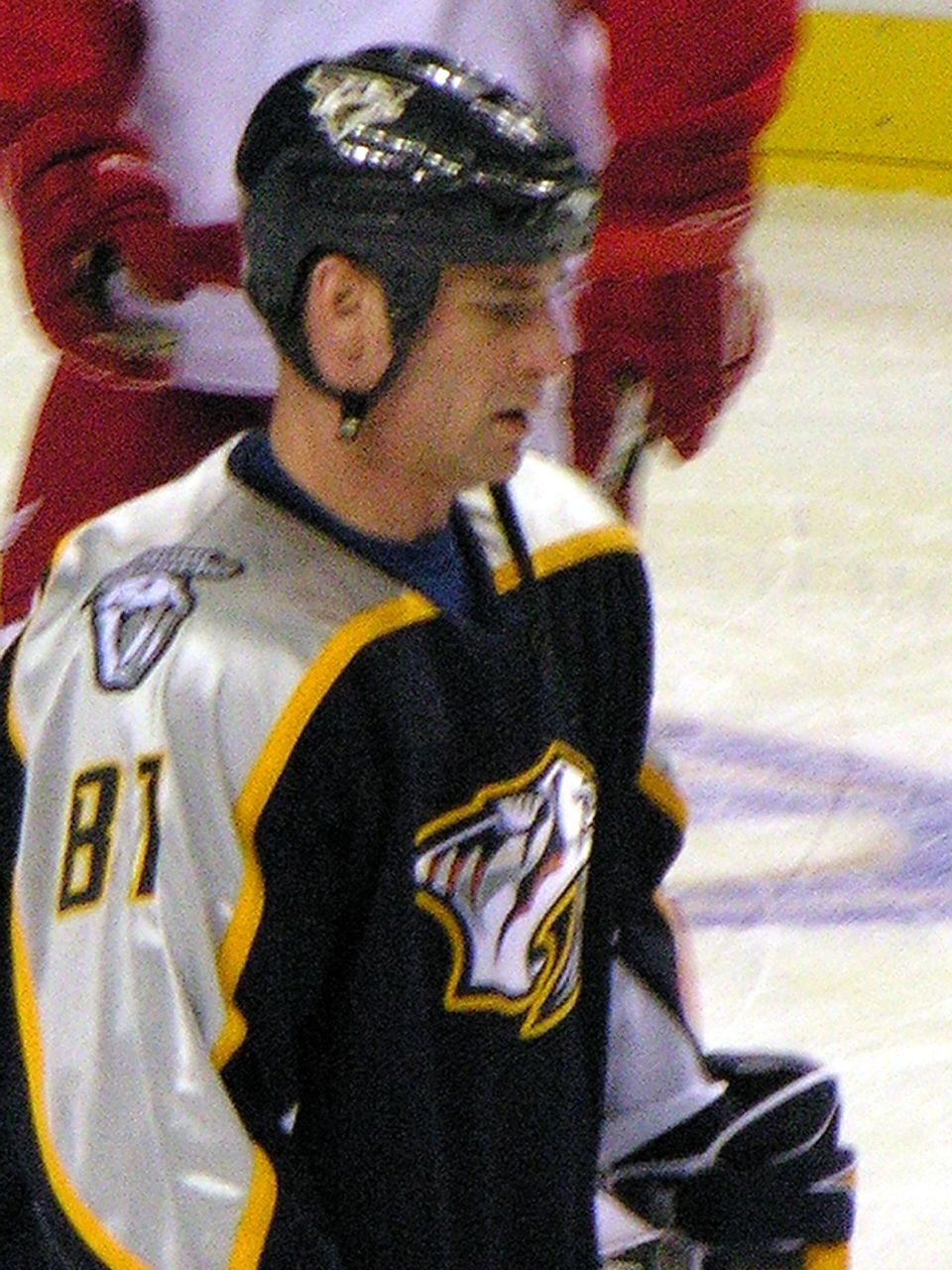
- Sillinger with the Nashville Predators in 2006
- Born: June 29, 1971 (age 55) Regina, Saskatchewan, Canada
- Height: 5 ft 10 in (178 cm)
- Weight: 180 lb (82 kg; 12 st 12 lb)
- Position: Centre
- Shot: Right
- Played for: Detroit Red Wings; EC Wien; Mighty Ducks of Anaheim; Vancouver Canucks; Philadelphia Flyers; Tampa Bay Lightning; Florida Panthers; Ottawa Senators; Columbus Blue Jackets; Phoenix Coyotes; St. Louis Blues; Nashville Predators; New York Islanders
- National team: Canada
- NHL draft: 11th overall, 1989; Detroit Red Wings
- Playing career: 1990–2009

Michael John Sillinger (born June 29, 1971) is a Canadian former professional ice hockey player who played in the National Hockey League (NHL) for 17 seasons. Sillinger played for 12 teams and was traded nine times during his NHL career, both of which are league records (tied with Brent Ashton for the latter).

Originally drafted 11th overall in 1989 out of the Western Hockey League (WHL) by the Detroit Red Wings, Sillinger began his NHL career in Detroit before continuing on to play for the Mighty Ducks of Anaheim, Vancouver Canucks, Philadelphia Flyers, Tampa Bay Lightning, Florida Panthers, Ottawa Senators, Columbus Blue Jackets, Phoenix Coyotes, St. Louis Blues, Nashville Predators and New York Islanders. Of these 12 teams, Sillinger played full seasons with only Detroit, Vancouver, Columbus and New York. During his tenure with Detroit, he captured a Calder Cup championship in 1992 with the Adirondack Red Wings, while leading the playoffs in scoring as an American Hockey League (AHL) rookie.

Internationally, Sillinger represented Team Canada on two occasions, winning a gold medal at the 1991 World Junior Championships and captaining his country at the 2000 World Championships.

After retirement, Sillinger joined the Edmonton Oilers as Director of Player Development from 2009 to 2014. Beginning in 2014, Sillinger began working in a scouting and recruitment role for the Regina Pats, his former junior club.

== Playing career ==
Sillinger began playing major junior in the Western Hockey League (WHL) with the Pats in 1987–88. After a 43-point rookie campaign, he emerged as a top prospect in the juniors in his second WHL season. With 53 goals and 131 points in 1988–89, Sillinger led the Pats in scoring for the first of three consecutive seasons. The Detroit Red Wings then made Sillinger their first-round pick, selecting him 11th overall in the 1989 NHL entry draft. Upon being drafted, Sillinger returned to the Pats for two more seasons, where he posted 129- and 116-point campaigns to receive WHL Second and First All-Star Team honours in 1990 and 1991, respectively.

Following his 1990–91 season with the Pats, Sillinger was called up to the Red Wings roster, making his NHL debut in the final three games of the regular season, tallying an assist. He also appeared in three playoff games with Detroit that season, also accumulating one assist. The following season, in 1991–92, Sillinger spent his professional rookie season in the American Hockey League (AHL) with Detroit's minor league affiliate, the Adirondack Red Wings, where he scored at an above-point-per-game pace with 66 points in 64 games. Despite being called up for eight games for Detroit's playoff run, Sillinger still went on to lead the AHL playoffs in scoring with 28 points in 15 games, winning the Calder Cup championship with Adirondack.

Sillinger continued to spend time in the AHL with Adirondack at the start of the 1992–93 season, but returned to and remained in the NHL later that season after scoring at a two-point-per-game pace in 15 games. After being called up to Detroit, he had his most prolific season with the club, scoring 29 points in 62 games. Due to the 1994–95 NHL lockout, Sillinger went abroad to play in the Austrian Hockey League for EC Wien, where he tallied 27 points in just 13 games. When NHL play resumed, he appeared in 13 games for the Red Wings before being traded to the Mighty Ducks of Anaheim on April 4, 1995 with Jason York for Stu Grimson, Mark Ferner and Anaheim's 6th round choice in 1996 NHL entry draft (used to select Magnus Nilsson).

Sillinger remained in Anaheim the next season, but was traded the following campaign in 1995–96 to the Vancouver Canucks in exchange for Roman Oksiuta on March 15, 1996. He played one full season with the Canucks in 1996–97, managing 37 points, before being dealt away to the Philadelphia Flyers midway through the 1997–98 season for a fifth-round selection in 1998 on February 5, 1998.

Sillinger's stint with the Flyers began promising, scoring 22 points in the 27 games to close the season following his trade, but after managing just three assists in the first 25 games in 1998–99, he was dealt away to the Tampa Bay Lightning midway through the campaign along with Chris Gratton, in exchange for Mikael Renberg and Daymond Langkow on December 12, 1998. Sillinger, however, continued to struggle and tallied just 10 points with his new team for the remainder of the campaign for a combined 13 points between the Flyers and Lightning, a career-low.

He returned to form as he started the 1999–2000 season in Tampa Bay, scoring 44 points in 67 games with the Lightning. However, at the trade deadline, he was sent to the Florida Panthers in exchange for Ryan Johnson and Dwayne Hay on March 14, 2000. Sillinger returned to the Panthers to begin the following season, but was once again dealt at the trade deadline, this time to the Ottawa Senators, marking his sixth trade in seven years.

In the 2001 off-season, Sillinger joined his eighth NHL team, the Columbus Blue Jackets, but for the first time was not relocating via trade, instead, joining the Blue Jackets through free agency. In two seasons with the Blue Jackets, Sillinger recorded back-to-back 43-point campaigns. Following his second season in Columbus, Sillinger was traded twice on the same day on July 22, 2003. He was first sent to the Dallas Stars with a second round draft choice in 2004 (Johan Fransson) for Darryl Sydor before being dealt again from Dallas to the Phoenix Coyotes for defenceman Teppo Numminen. In his first season with Phoenix, however, he was dealt again at the trade deadline to the St. Louis Blues for goaltender Brent Johnson.

After finishing the 2003–04 season with the Blues, Sillinger remained inactive in 2004–05 due to the NHL lockout. When NHL play resumed in 2005–06, Sillinger broke the NHL record for teams played with, previously held by Michel Petit and J. J. Daigneault, by joining the Nashville Predators, again, at the trade deadline. He was traded from St. Louis in exchange for Timofei Shishkanov on January 30, 2006. In his fourteenth NHL season, Sillinger set a career-high 63 points playing between St. Louis and Nashville after having recorded just 24 points the previous season between Phoenix and St. Louis.

Becoming an unrestricted free agent in the 2006 off-season, Sillinger joined his twelfth and final NHL team, the New York Islanders, signing on July 2, 2006. He continued where he left off from his career season in 2005–06 with 59 points in his first season with the Islanders. Helping New York to the post-season, he set another NHL record by competing in the playoffs for his eighth NHL team. In 2007–08, Sillinger played in his 1,000th NHL game on November 1, 2007, versus the Tampa Bay Lightning. His family joined him on ice for a pre-game ceremony honouring the achievement. Sillinger went on to tally an assist in the milestone game as the Islanders won 4–0. His second season with the Islanders was, however, cut short due to a hip injury that required microfracture surgery in February 2008. He finished the campaign with 26 points in 52 games.

Playing in his 17th NHL season in 2008–09, Sillinger was met with further hip complications and underwent hip resurfacing surgery in February 2009, forcing him to miss the remainder of the season. Due to the lingering hip complications, Sillinger announced his retirement from hockey on August 26, 2009.

== Personal life ==
Sillinger was born and raised in Regina, Saskatchewan. He has three sons, Owen, Lukas, and Cole, with his wife Karla, also a Regina native. During Sillinger's NHL career, the family spent the off-seasons in Regina, and have chosen to remain in Regina following Sillinger's retirement. Owen played for the Regina Pat Canadians midget hockey team and was named the most valuable player at the 2015 Telus Cup. Owen now plays with the Cleveland Monsters of the AHL, and Lukas plays with Greensboro in the ECHL. Cole was the 11th overall pick in the 2018 WHL Bantam Draft to the Medicine Hat Tigers. Cole was selected twelfth overall in the 2021 NHL entry draft by the Columbus Blue Jackets, one of Mike’s former teams.

== Career statistics ==
=== Regular season and playoffs ===
| | | | Regular season | | | | | Playoffs |
| Season | Team | League | GP | G | A | Pts | PIM | GP | G | A | Pts | PIM |
|---|---|---|---|---|---|---|---|---|---|---|---|---|
| 1987–88 | Regina Pats | WHL | 67 | 18 | 25 | 43 | 17 | 4 | 2 | 2 | 4 | 0 |
| 1988–89 | Regina Pats | WHL | 72 | 53 | 78 | 131 | 52 | — | — | — | — | — |
| 1989–90 | Regina Pats | WHL | 70 | 57 | 72 | 129 | 41 | 11 | 12 | 10 | 22 | 2 |
| 1989–90 | Adirondack Red Wings | AHL | — | — | — | — | — | 1 | 0 | 0 | 0 | 0 |
| 1990–91 | Regina Pats | WHL | 57 | 50 | 66 | 116 | 42 | 8 | 6 | 9 | 15 | 4 |
| 1990–91 | Detroit Red Wings | NHL | 3 | 0 | 1 | 1 | 0 | 3 | 0 | 1 | 1 | 0 |
| 1991–92 | Adirondack Red Wings | AHL | 64 | 25 | 41 | 66 | 26 | 15 | 9 | 19 | 28 | 12 |
| 1991–92 | Detroit Red Wings | NHL | — | — | — | — | — | 8 | 2 | 2 | 4 | 2 |
| 1992–93 | Adirondack Red Wings | AHL | 15 | 10 | 20 | 30 | 31 | 11 | 5 | 13 | 18 | 10 |
| 1992–93 | Detroit Red Wings | NHL | 51 | 4 | 17 | 21 | 16 | — | — | — | — | — |
| 1993–94 | Detroit Red Wings | NHL | 62 | 8 | 21 | 29 | 10 | — | — | — | — | — |
| 1994–95 | Wiener EV | AUT | 13 | 13 | 14 | 27 | 10 | — | — | — | — | — |
| 1994–95 | Detroit Red Wings | NHL | 13 | 2 | 6 | 8 | 2 | — | — | — | — | — |
| 1994–95 | Mighty Ducks of Anaheim | NHL | 15 | 2 | 5 | 7 | 6 | — | — | — | — | — |
| 1995–96 | Mighty Ducks of Anaheim | NHL | 62 | 13 | 21 | 34 | 32 | — | — | — | — | — |
| 1995–96 | Vancouver Canucks | NHL | 12 | 1 | 3 | 4 | 6 | 6 | 0 | 0 | 0 | 2 |
| 1996–97 | Vancouver Canucks | NHL | 78 | 17 | 20 | 37 | 25 | — | — | — | — | — |
| 1997–98 | Vancouver Canucks | NHL | 48 | 10 | 9 | 19 | 34 | — | — | — | — | — |
| 1997–98 | Philadelphia Flyers | NHL | 27 | 11 | 11 | 22 | 16 | 3 | 1 | 0 | 1 | 0 |
| 1998–99 | Philadelphia Flyers | NHL | 25 | 0 | 3 | 3 | 8 | — | — | — | — | — |
| 1998–99 | Tampa Bay Lightning | NHL | 54 | 8 | 2 | 10 | 28 | — | — | — | — | — |
| 1999–00 | Tampa Bay Lightning | NHL | 67 | 19 | 25 | 44 | 86 | — | — | — | — | — |
| 1999–00 | Florida Panthers | NHL | 13 | 4 | 4 | 8 | 16 | 4 | 2 | 1 | 3 | 2 |
| 2000–01 | Florida Panthers | NHL | 55 | 13 | 21 | 34 | 44 | — | — | — | — | — |
| 2000–01 | Ottawa Senators | NHL | 13 | 3 | 4 | 7 | 4 | 4 | 0 | 0 | 0 | 2 |
| 2001–02 | Columbus Blue Jackets | NHL | 80 | 20 | 23 | 43 | 54 | — | — | — | — | — |
| 2002–03 | Columbus Blue Jackets | NHL | 75 | 18 | 25 | 43 | 52 | — | — | — | — | — |
| 2003–04 | Phoenix Coyotes | NHL | 60 | 8 | 6 | 14 | 54 | — | — | — | — | — |
| 2003–04 | St. Louis Blues | NHL | 16 | 5 | 5 | 10 | 14 | 5 | 3 | 1 | 4 | 6 |
| 2005–06 | St. Louis Blues | NHL | 48 | 22 | 19 | 41 | 49 | — | — | — | — | — |
| 2005–06 | Nashville Predators | NHL | 31 | 10 | 12 | 22 | 14 | 5 | 2 | 1 | 3 | 12 |
| 2006–07 | New York Islanders | NHL | 82 | 26 | 33 | 59 | 46 | 5 | 1 | 1 | 2 | 2 |
| 2007–08 | New York Islanders | NHL | 52 | 14 | 12 | 26 | 28 | — | — | — | — | — |
| 2008–09 | New York Islanders | NHL | 7 | 2 | 0 | 2 | 0 | — | — | — | — | — |
| 2008–09 | Bridgeport Sound Tigers | AHL | 3 | 1 | 3 | 4 | 2 | — | — | — | — | — |
| NHL totals | | | 1,049 | 240 | 308 | 548 | 644 | 43 | 11 | 7 | 18 | 28 |

Medal record

Representing Canada

Ice hockey

World Junior Championships
| Gold medal – first place | 1991 Canada | |

=== International ===
| Year | Team | Event | Result | GP | G | A | Pts | PIM |
|---|---|---|---|---|---|---|---|---|
| 1991 | Canada | WJC | 1st place, gold medalist(s) | 7 | 4 | 2 | 6 | 2 |
| 2000 | Canada | WC | 4th | 9 | 3 | 0 | 3 | 4 |
| Junior totals | | | | 7 | 4 | 2 | 6 | 2 |
| Senior totals | | | | 9 | 3 | 0 | 3 | 4 |

== Awards and honours ==
| Award | Year |
|---|---|
WHL
| East Second All-Star Team | 1990 |
| East First All-Star Team | 1991 |
AHL
| Calder Cup (Adirondack Red Wings) | 1992 |

== See also ==
- List of NHL players with 1,000 games played

Awards and achievements
| Preceded by Kory Kocur | Detroit Red Wings first-round draft pick 1989 | Succeeded by Keith Primeau |
