= List of USHL players drafted by NHL teams =

List of United States Hockey League players drafted by the National Hockey League.

== Draftees ==
Year	Name	USHL Team	NHL team	Round, Overall
2023	Will Smith	U.S. NTDP	San Jose	1st, 4th
2023	Ryan Leonard	U.S. NTDP	Washington	1st, 8th
2023	Oliver Moore	U.S. NTDP	Chicago	1st, 19th
2023	Gabe Perreault	U.S. NTDP	NY Rangers	1st, 23rd
2023	Michael Hrabal	Omaha	Arizona	2nd, 38th
2023	Maxim Strbak	Sioux Falls	Buffalo	2nd, 45th
2023	Brady Cleveland	U.S. NTDP	Detroit	2nd, 47th
2023	Danny Nelson	U.S. NTDP	NY Islanders	2nd, 49th
2023	Martin Misiak	Youngstown	Chicago	2nd, 55th
2023	William Whitelaw	Youngstown	Columbus	3rd, 66th
2023	Jacob Fowler	Youngstown	Montreal	3rd, 69th
2023	Brandon Svoboda	Youngstown	San Jose	3rd, 71st
2023	Tanner Ludtke	Lincoln	Arizona	3rd, 81st
2023	Gavin McCarthy	Muskegon	Buffalo	3rd, 86th
2023	Christopher Pelosi	Sioux Falls	Boston	3rd, 92nd
2023	Jayden Perron	Chicago	Carolina	3rd, 94th
2023	Andrew Strathmann	Youngstown	Columbus	4th, 98th
2023	Cole Knuble	Fargo	Philadelphia	4th, 103rd
2023	Ty Henricks	Fargo	NY Rangers	6th, 183rd
Year	Name	USHL Team	NHL team	Round, Overall
2022	Logan Cooley	U.S. NTDP	Arizona	1st, 3rd
2022	Cutter Gauthier	U.S. NTDP	Philadelphia	1st, 5th
2022	Frank Nazar	U.S. NTDP	Chicago	1st, 13th
2022	Rutger McGroarty	U.S. NTDP	Winnipeg	1st, 14th
2022	Jimmy Snuggerud	U.S. NTDP	St. Louis	1st, 23rd
2022	Isaac Howard	U.S. NTDP	Tampa Bay	1st, 31st
2022	Cameron Lund	Green Bay	San Jose	2nd, 34th
2022	Ryan Chesley	U.S. NTDP	Washington	2nd, 37th
2022	Dylan James	Sioux City	Detroit	2nd, 40th
2022	Seamus Casey	U.S. NTDP	New Jersey Devils	2nd, 46th
2022	Ryan Greene	Green Bay	Chicago	2nd, 57th
2022	Lane Hutson	U.S. NTDP	Montreal	2nd, 62nd
Year	Name	USHL Team	NHL team	Round, Overall
2021	Luke Hughes	U.S. NTDP	New Jersey	1st, 4th
2021	Tyler Boucher	U.S. NTDP	Ottawa	1st, 10th
2021	Cole Sillinger	Sioux Falls	Columbus	1st, 12th
2021	Matthew Coronato	Chicago	Calgary	1st, 13th
2021	Chaz Lucius	U.S. NTDP	Winnipeg	1st, 18th
2021	Mackie Samoskevich	Chicago	Florida	1st, 24th
2021	Shai Buium	Sioux City	Detroit	2nd, 36th
2021	Josh Doan	Chicago	Arizona	2nd, 37th
2021	Matthew Knies	Tri-City	Toronto	2nd, 57th
2021	Tristan Broz	Fargo	Pittsburgh	2nd, 58th
2021	Sean Behrens	U.S. NTDP	Colorado	2nd, 61st
2021	Sasha Pastujov	U.S. NTDP	Anaheim	3rd, 66th
2021	Carter Mazur	Tri-City	Detroit	3rd, 70th
2021	Ayrton Martino	Omaha	Dallas	3rd, 73rd
2021	Brent Johnson	Sioux Falls	Washington	3rd, 80th
2021	Andrei Buyalsky	Dubuque	Colorado	3rd, 92nd
2021	Aidan Hreschuk	U.S. NTDP	Carolina	3rd, 94th
2021	Roman Schmidt	U.S. NTDP	Tampa Bay	3rd, 96th
2021	Guillaume Richard	Tri-City	Columbus	4th, 101st
2021	Jackson Blake	Chicago	Carolina	4th, 109th
2021	Redmond Savage	U.S. NTDP	Detroit	4th, 114th
2021	Ryan Ufko	Chicago	Nashville	4th, 115th
2021	Cameron Berg	Muskegon	NY Islanders	4th, 125th
2021	Dylan Duke	U.S. NTDP	Tampa Bay	4th, 126th
2021	Jack Bar	Chicago	Dallas	5th, 138th
2021	Ty Murchison	U.S. NTDP	Philadelphia	5th, 158th
2021	Liam Gilmartin	U.S. NTDP	San Jose	6th, 167th
2021	Alex Gagne	Muskegon	Tampa Bay	6th, 192nd
2021	Justin Janicke	U.S. NTDP	Seattle	7th, 195th
2021	Hank Kempf	Muskegon	NY Rangers	7th, 208th
2021	Andre Gasseau	U.S. NTDP	Boston	7th, 213th
2021	Daniel Laatsch	Sioux City	Pittsburgh	7th, 215th
2021	Ty Gallagher	U.S. NTDP	Boston	7th, 217th
2021	Samuel Lipkin	Chicago	Arizona	7th, 223rd
Year	Name	USHL Team	NHL team	Round, Overall
2020	Jake Sanderson	U.S. NTDP	Ottawa	1st, 5th
2020	Brendan Brisson	Chicago	Vegas	1st, 29th
2020	Sam Colangelo	Chicago	Anaheim	2nd, 36th
2020	Thomas Bordeleau	U.S. NTDP	San Jose	2nd, 38th
2020	Tyler Kleven	U.S. NTDP	Ottawa	2nd, 44th
2020	Brock Faber	U.S. NTDP	Los Angeles	2nd, 45th
2020	Drew Commesso	U.S. NTDP	Chicago	2nd, 46th
2020	Luke Tuch	U.S. NTDP	Montreal	2nd, 47th
2020	Mason Lohrei	Green Bay	Boston	2nd, 58th
2020	Ty Smilanic	U.S. NTDP	Florida	3rd, 74th
2020	Daniil Gushchin	Muskegon	San Jose	3rd, 76th
2020	Landon Slaggert	U.S. NTDP	Chicago	3rd, 79th
2020	Alex Laferriere	Des Moines	Los Angeles	3rd, 83rd
2020	Dylan Peterson	U.S. NTDP	St. Louis	3rd, 86th
2020	Sam Stange	Sioux Falls	Detroit	4th, 97th
2020	Jack Smith	Sioux Falls	Montreal	4th, 102nd
2020	Mitchell Miller	Tri-City	Arizona	4th, 111th
2020	Eamon Powell	U.S. NTDP	Tampa Bay	4th, 116th
2020	Colby Ambrosio	Tri-City	Colorado	4th, 118th
2020	Sean Farrell	Chicago	Montreal	4th, 124th
2020	Brett Berard	U.S. NTDP	NY Rangers	5th, 134th
2020	Jakub Dobeš	Omaha	Montreal	5th, 136th
2020	Ryder Rolston	Waterloo	Colorado	5th, 139th
2020	Carson Bantle	Madison	Arizona	5th, 142nd
2020	Jacob Truscott	U.S. NTDP	Vancouver	5th, 144th
2020	Mason Langenbrunner	Sioux City	Boston	5th, 151st
2020	Kyle Aucoin	Tri-City	Detroit	6th, 156th
2020	Nick Capone	Tri-City	Tampa Bay	6th, 157th
2020	Luke Reid	Chicago	Nashville	6th, 166th
2020	Chase Yoder	U.S. NTDP	Pittsburgh	6th, 170th
2020	Joe Miller	Chicago	Toronto	6th, 180th
2020	Noah Ellis	Des Moines	Vegas	6th, 184th
2020	Noah Beck	Fargo	St. Louis	7th, 194th
2020	Wyatt Schingoethe	Waterloo	Toronto	7th, 195th
2020	Chase Bradley	Sioux City	Detroit	7th, 203rd
2020	Timofei Spitserov	Muskegon	San Jose	7th, 210th
Year	Name	USHL Team	NHL team	Round, Overall
2019	Jack Hughes	U.S. NTDP	New Jersey	1st, 1st
2019	Alex Turcotte	U.S. NTDP	Los Angeles	1st, 5th
2019	Trevor Zegras	U.S. NTDP	Anaheim	1st, 9th
2019	Matthew Boldy	U.S. NTDP	Minnesota	1st, 12th
2019	Spencer Knight	U.S. NTDP	Florida	1st, 13th
2019	Cam York	U.S. NTDP	Philadelphia	1st, 14th
2019	Cole Caufield	U.S. NTDP	Montreal	1st, 15th
2019	Johnny Beecher	U.S. NTDP	Boston	1st, 30th
2019	Ryan Johnson	Sioux Falls	Buffalo	1st, 31st
2019	Shane Pinto	Tri-City	Ottawa	2nd, 32nd
2019	Bobby Brink	Sioux City	Philadelphia	2nd, 34th
2019	Vladislav Firstov	Waterloo	Minnesota	2nd, 42nd
2019	Alex Vlasic	U.S. NTDP	Chicago	2nd, 43rd
2019	Egor Afanasyev	Muskegon	Nashville	2nd, 45th
2019	Drew Helleson	U.S. NTDP	Colorado	2nd, 47th
2019	Robert Mastrosimone	Chicago	Detroit	2nd, 54th
2019	Zac Jones	Tri-City	NY Rangers	3rd, 68th
2019	Ronnie Attard	Tri-City	Philadelphia	3rd, 72nd
2019	Domenick Fensore	U.S. NTDP	Carolina	3rd, 90th
2019	Tyce Thompson	Dubuque	New Jersey	4th, 96th
2019	Ethan Phillips	Sioux Falls	Detroit	4th, 97th
2019	Matias Maccelli	Dubuque	Arizona	4th, 98th
2019	Matěj Blümel	Waterloo	Edmonton	4th, 100th
2019	Henry Thrun	U.S. NTDP	Anaheim	4th, 101st
2019	Aaron Huglen	Fargo	Buffalo	4th, 102nd
2019	Ryder Donovan	Dubuque	Vegas	4th, 110th
2019	Hunter Skinner	Lincoln	NY Rangers	4th, 112th
2019	Case McCarthy	U.S. NTDP	New Jersey	4th, 118th
2019	Max Crozier	Sioux Falls	Tampa Bay	4th, 120th
2019	Nick Abruzzese	Chicago	Toronto	4th, 124th
2019	Trevor Janicke	Central Illinois	Anaheim	5th, 132nd
2019	Isaiah Saville	Tri-City	Vegas	5th, 135th
2019	Owen Lindmark	U.S. NTDP	Florida	5th, 137th
2019	Marcus Kallionkieli	Sioux City	Vegas	5th, 139th
2019	Judd Caulfield	U.S. NTDP	Pittsburgh	5th, 145th
2019	Joshua Nodler	Fargo	Calgary	5th, 150th
2019	Patrick Moynihan	U.S. NTDP	New Jersey	6th, 158th
2019	Will Francis	Cedar Rapids	Anaheim	6th, 163rd
2019	Marshall Warren	U.S. NTDP	Minnesota	6th, 166th
2019	Anthony Romano	Sioux Falls	Arizona	6th, 176th
2019	Jack Malone	Youngstown	Vancouver	6th, 180th
2019	Andre Lee	Sioux Falls	Los Angeles	7th, 188th
2019	Jake Schmaltz	Chicago	Boston	7th, 192nd
2019	Aidan McDonough	Cedar Rapids	Vancouver	7th, 195nd
2019	McKade Webster	Green Bay	Tampa Bay	7th, 213th
Year	Name	USHL Team	NHL team	Round, Overall
2018	Oliver Wahlstrom	U.S. NTDP	NY Islanders	1st, 11th
2018	Joel Farabee	U.S. NTDP	Philadelphia	1st, 14th
2018	K'Andre Miller	U.S. NTDP	NY Rangers	1st, 22nd
2018	Mattias Samuelsson	U.S. NTDP	Buffalo	2nd, 32nd
2018	Bode Wilde	U.S. NTDP	NY Islanders	2nd, 41st
2018	Jack Drury	Waterloo	Carolina	2nd, 42nd
2018	Tyler Madden	Tri-City	Vancouver	3rd, 68th
2018	Jake Wise	U.S. NTDP	Chicago	3rd, 69th
2018	Ty Emberson	U.S. NTDP	Arizona	3rd, 73rd
2018	Sampo Ranta	Sioux City	Colorado	3rd, 78th
2018	Blake McLaughlin	Chicago	Anaheim	3rd, 79th
2018	Nathan Smith	Cedar Rapids	Winnipeg	3rd, 91st
2018	Matej Pekar	Muskegon	Buffalo	4th, 94th
2018	Jonathan Gruden	U.S. NTDP	Ottawa	4th, 95th
2018	Ryan O'Reilly	Madison	Detroit	4th, 98th
2018	Jake Pivonka	U.S. NTDP	NY Islanders	4th, 103rd
2018	Martin Pospíšil	Sioux City	Calgary	4th, 105th
2018	Tyler Weiss	U.S. NTDP	Colorado	4th, 109th
2018	Jachym Kondelik	Muskegon	Nashville	4th, 111th
2018	John St. Ivany	Sioux Falls	Philadelphia	4th, 112th
2018	Ivan Prosvetov	Youngstown	Arizona	4th, 114th
2018	Paul Cotter	Lincoln	Vegas	4th, 115th
2018	Curtis Hall	Youngstown	Boston	4th, 119th
2018	Spencer Stastney	U.S. NTDP	Nashville	5th, 131st
2018	Mikael Hakkarainen	Muskegon	Chicago	5th, 139th
2018	Mike Callahan	Youngstown	Arizona	5th, 142nd
2018	Roman Durný	Des Moines	Anaheim	5th, 147th
2018	Mathias Emilio Pettersen	Muskegon	Calgary	6th, 167th
2018	Gavin Hain	U.S. NTDP	Philadelphia	6th, 174th
2018	Cole Koepke	Sioux City	Tampa Bay	6th, 183rd
2018	Jared Moe	Waterloo	Winnipeg	6th, 184th
2018	Josiah Slavin	Lincoln	Chicago	7th, 193rd
2018	Christian Krygier	Lincoln	NY Islanders	7th, 196th
2018	Jacob Kucharski	Des Moines	Carolina	7th, 197th
2018	Cole Krygier	Lincoln	Florida	7th, 201st
2018	Sam Hentges	Tri-City	Minnesota	7th, 210th
Year	Name	USHL Team	NHL team	Round, Overall
2017	Casey Mittelstadt	Green Bay	Buffalo	1st, 8th
2017	Josh Norris	U.S. NTDP	San Jose	1st, 19th
2017	Shane Bowers	Waterloo	Ottawa	1st, 28th
2017	Eeli Tolvanen	Sioux City	Nashville	1st, 30th
2017	Mario Ferraro	Des Moines	San Jose	2nd, 49th
2017	Grant Mismash	U.S. NTDP	Nashville	2nd, 61st
2017	Max Gildon	U.S. NTDP	Florida	3rd, 66th
2017	Kasper Kotkansalo	Sioux Falls	Detroit	3rd, 71st
2017	Ben Mirageas	Chicago	NY Islanders	3rd, 77th
2017	Reilly Walsh	Chicago	New Jersey	3rd, 81st
2017	Keith Petruzzelli	Muskegon	Detroit	3rd, 88th
2017	Evan Barratt	U.S. NTDP	Chicago	3rd, 90th
2017	Jack Badini	Chicago	Anaheim	3rd, 91st
2017	David Farrance	U.S. NTDP	Nashville	3rd, 92nd
2017	Clayton Phillips	Fargo	Pittsburgh	3rd, 93rd
2017	Maxim Zhukov	Green Bay	Vegas	4th, 96th
2017	Scott Reedy	U.S. NTDP	San Jose	4th, 102nd
2017	Mikey Anderson	Waterloo	Los Angeles	4th, 103rd
2017	Jeremy Swayman	Sioux Falls	Boston	4th, 111th
2017	Michael Karow	Youngstown	Arizona	5th, 126th
2017	Tyler Inamoto	U.S. NTDP	Florida	5th, 133rd
2017	Cole Hults	Madison	Los Angeles	5th, 134th
2017	John Adams	Fargo	Detroit	6th, 162nd
2017	Cole Guttman	Dubuque	Tampa Bay	6th, 180th
2017	Linus Weissbach	Tri-City	Buffalo	7th, 192nd
2017	Wyatt Kalynuk	Bloomington	Philadelphia	7th, 196th
2017	Cayden Primeau	Lincoln	Montreal	7th, 199th
2017	Logan Cockerill	U.S. NTDP	NY Islanders	7th, 201st
2017	Philip Kemp	U.S. NTDP	Edmonton	7th, 208th
2017	Nick Swaney	Waterloo	Minnesota	7th, 209th
2017	Matt Hellickson	Sioux City	New Jersey	7th, 214th
Year	Name	USHL Team	NHL team	Round, Overall
2016	Clayton Keller	U.S. NTDP	Arizona	1st, 7th
2016	Kieffer Bellows	U.S. NTDP	NY Islanders	1st, 19th
2016	Riley Tufte	Fargo	Dallas	1st, 25th
2016	Trent Frederic	U.S. NTDP	Boston	1st, 29th
2016	Andrew Peeke	Green Bay	Columbus	2nd, 34th
2016	Cam Morrison	Youngstown	Colorado	2nd, 40th
2016	Chad Krys	U.S. NTDP	Chicago	2nd, 45th
2016	Ryan Lindgren	U.S. NTDP	Boston	2nd, 49th
2016	Wade Allison	Tri-City	Philadelphia	2nd, 52nd
2016	Joseph Woll	U.S. NTDP	Toronto	3rd, 62nd
2016	Will Lockwood	U.S. NTDP	Vancouver	3rd, 64th
2016	Adam Fox	U.S. NTDP	NY Rangers	3rd, 66th
2016	Matt Felipe	Cedar Rapids	Carolina	3rd, 67th
2016	J. D. Greenway	U.S. NTDP	Toronto	3rd, 72nd
2016	Joey Anderson	U.S. NTDP	Carolina	3rd, 73rd
2016	Rem Pitlick	Muskegon	Nashville	3rd, 76th
2016	Brandon Duhaime	Try-City	New Jersey	4th, 106th
2016	Ross Colton	Cedar Rapids	Tampa Bay	4th, 118th
2016	Ryan Jones	Lincoln	Pittsburgh	4th, 121st
2016	Graham McPhee	U.S. NTDP	Edmonton	5th, 149th
2016	Tanner Laczynski	Lincoln	Philadelphia	6th, 169th
2016	Collin Adams	Muskegon	NY Islanders	6th, 170th
2016	Nick Pastujov	U.S. NTDP	NY Islanders	7th, 193rd
2016	Jake Ryczek	Waterloo	Chicago	7th, 203rd
2016	Ryan Lohin	Waterloo	Tampa Bay	7th, 208th
Year	Name	USHL Team	NHL team	Round, Overall
2015	Kyle Connor	Youngstown	Winnipeg	1st, 18th
2015	Colin White	U.S. NTDP	Ottawa	1st, 21st
2015	Brock Boeser	Waterloo	Vancouver	1st, 23rd
2015	Jack Roslovic	U.S. NTDP	Winnipeg	1st, 25th
2015	Christian Fischer	U.S. NTDP	Arizona	2nd, 32nd
2015	Jakob Forsbacka Karlsson	Omaha	Boston	2nd, 45th
2015	Jordan Greenway	U.S. NTDP	Minnesota	2nd, 50th
2015	Jeremy Bracco	U.S. NTDP	Toronto	2nd, 61st
2015	Vili Saarijärvi	Green Bay	Detroit	3rd, 73rd
2015	Erik Foley	Cedar Rapids	Winnipeg	3rd, 78th
2015	Brent Gates	Green Bay	Anaheim	3rd, 80th
2015	Brendan Warren	U.S. NTDP	Arizona	3rd, 81st
2015	Tommy Novak	Waterloo	Nashville	3rd, 85th
2015	Dennis Gilbert	Chicago	Chicago	3rd, 91st
2015	Christian Wolanin	Muskegon	Ottawa	4th, 107th
2015	Caleb Jones	U.S. NTDP	Edmonton	4th, 117th
2015	Joseph Cecconi	Muskegon	Dallas	5th, 133rd
2015	Chase Pearson	Youngstown	Detroit	5th, 140th
2015	Luke Opilka	U.S. NTDP	St. Louis	5th, 146th
2015	Troy Terry	U.S. NTDP	Anaheim	5th, 148th
2015	Adam Gaudette	Cedar Rapids	Vancouver	5th, 149th
2015	Ryan Zuhlsdorf	Sioux City	Tampa Bay	5th, 150th
2015	Kristian Oldham	Omaha	Tampa Bay	6th, 153rd
2015	Cooper Marody	Sioux City	Philadelphia	6th, 158th
2015	Christopher Wilkie	Tri-City	Florida	6th, 162nd
2015	Mason Appleton	Tri-City	Winnipeg	6th, 168th
2015	Nick Boka	U.S. NTDP	Minnesota	6th, 171st
2015	Steven Ruggiero	U.S. NTDP	Anaheim	6th, 178th
2015	Garrett Metcalf	Madison	Anaheim	6th, 179th
2015	Adam Húska	Green Bay	NY Rangers	7th, 184th
2015	Nikita Pavlychev	Des Moines	Pittsburgh	7th, 197th
Year	Name	USHL Team	NHL team	Round, Overall
2014	Dylan Larkin	U.S. NTDP	Detroit	1st, 15th
2014	Sonny Milano	U.S. NTDP	Columbus	1st, 16th
2014	Alex Tuch	U.S. NTDP	Minnesota	1st, 18th
2014	Nick Schmaltz	Green Bay	Chicago	1st, 20th
2014	Josh Jacobs	Indiana	New Jersey	2nd, 41st
2014	Ryan Collins	U.S. NTDP	Columbus	2nd, 47th
2014	Jack Dougherty	U.S. NTDP	Nashville	2nd, 51st
2014	Maxim Letunov	Youngstown	St. Louis	2nd, 52nd
2014	Brandon Montour	Waterloo	Anaheim	2nd, 55th
2014	Johnathan MacLeod	U.S. NTDP	Tampa Bay	2nd, 57th
2014	Jack Glover	U.S. NTDP	Winnipeg	3rd, 69th
2014	Louie Belpedio	U.S. NTDP	Minnesota	3rd, 80th
2014	Matt Iacopelli	Muskegon	Chicago	3rd, 83rd
2014	Mark Friedman	Waterloo	Philadelphia	3rd, 86th
2014	Joe Wegwerth	U.S. NTDP	Florida	4th, 92nd
2014	Fredrik Olofsson	Chicago	Chicago	4th, 98th
2014	Shane Eiserman	Dubuque	Ottawa	4th, 100th
2014	J.J. Piccinich	Youngstown	Toronto	4th, 103rd
2014	Ryan Mantha	Sioux City	New York	4th, 104th
2014	Austin Poganski	Tri-City	St. Louis	4th, 110th
2014	Steven Johnson	Omaha	Los Angeles	4th, 120th
2014	Dakota Joshua	Sioux Falls	Toronto	5th, 128th
2014	C.J. Suess	Sioux Falls	Winnipeg	5th, 129th
2014	Shane Gersich	U.S. NTDP	Washington	5th, 134th
2014	Anthony Angello	Omaha	Pittsburgh	5th, 145th
2014	Anders Bjork	U.S. NTDP	Boston	5th, 146th
2014	Tyler Vesel	Omaha	Edmonton	6th, 153rd
2014	Steven Spinner	Omaha	Washington	6th, 159th
2014	Hayden Hawkey	Omaha	Montreal	6th, 177th
2014	Jared Fiegl	U.S. NTDP	Arizona	7th, 191st
2014	Dwyer Tschantz	Indiana	St. Louis	7th, 202nd
Year	Name	USHL Team	NHL team	Round, Overall
2013	Michael McCarron	U.S. NTDP	Montreal	1st, 25th
2013	Ian McCoshen	Waterloo	Florida	2nd, 31st
2013	Gustav Olofsson	Green Bay	Minnesota	2nd, 46th
2013	Eamon McAdam	Waterloo	NY Islanders	3rd, 70th
2013	John Hayden	U.S. NTDP	Chicago	3rd, 74th
2013	Taylor Cammarata	Waterloo	NY Islanders	3rd, 76th
2013	Jake Guentzel	Sioux City	Pittsburgh	3rd, 77th
2013	Keaton Thompson	U.S. NTDP	Anaheim	3rd, 87th
2013	Michael Downing	Dubuque	Florida	4th, 97th
2013	Hudson Fasching	U.S. NTDP	Los Angeles	4th, 118th
2013	Tyler Motte	U.S. NTDP	Chicago	4th, 121st
2013	Will Butcher	U.S. NTDP	Colorado	5th, 123rd
2013	Tucker Poolman	Omaha	Winnipeg	5th, 127th
2013	Cal Petersen	Waterloo	Buffalo	5th, 129th
2013	Connor Clifton	U.S. NTDP	Phoenix	5th, 133rd
2013	Luke Johnson	Lincoln	Chicago	5th, 134th
2013	Michael Brodzinski	Muskegon	San Jose	5th, 141st
2013	Blake Heinrich	Sioux City	Washington	5th, 144th
2013	Grant Besse	Omaha	Anaheim	5th, 147th
2013	Gage Ausmus	U.S. NTDP	San Jose	5th, 151st
2013	Ben Storm	Muskegon	Colorado	6th, 153rd
2013	Sean Malone	U.S. NTDP	Buffalo	6th, 159th
2013	Anthony Louis	U.S. NTDP	Chicago	6th, 181st
2013	David Drake	Des Moines	Philadelphia	7th, 192nd
2013	Peter Quenneville	Dubuque	Columbus	7th, 195th
Year	Name	USHL Team	NHL team	Round, Overall
2012	Jacob Trouba	U.S. NTDP	Winnipeg	1st, 9th
2012	Zemgus Girgensons	Dubuque	Buffalo	1st, 14th
2012	Michael Matheson	Dubuque	Florida	1st, 23rd
2012	Jordan Schmaltz	Green Bay	St. Louis	1st, 25th
2012	Brady Skjei	U.S. NTDP	NY Rangers	1st, 28th
2012	Stefan Matteau	U.S. NTDP	New Jersey	1st, 29th
2012	Nicolas Kerdiles	U.S. NTDP	Anaheim	2nd, 36th
2012	Patrick Sieloff	U.S. NTDP	Calgary	2nd, 42nd
2012	Jon Gillies	Indiana	Calgary	3rd, 75th
2012	Matthew Grzelcyk	U.S. NTDP	Boston	3rd, 85th
2012	Kevin Roy	Lincoln	Anaheim	4th, 97th
2012	Thomas Di Pauli	U.S. NTDP	Washington	4th, 100th
2012	Jaccob Slavin	U.S. NTDP	Carolina	4th, 120th
2012	Brian Cooper	U.S. NTDP	Fargo	5th, 127th
2012	Robert Baillargeon	Indiana	Ottawa	5th, 136th
2012	Connor Carrick	U.S. NTDP	Washington	5th, 137th
2012	Michael McKee	Lincoln	Detroit	5th, 140th
2012	Collin Olson	U.S. NTDP	Carolina	6th, 159th
2012	Riley Barber	U.S. NTDP	Washington	6th, 167th
2012	Clifford Watson	Sioux City	San Jose	6th, 168th
2012	Vinnie Hinostroza	Waterloo	Chicago	6th, 169th
2012	Paul LaDue	Lincoln	Los Angeles	6th, 181st
2012	Matthew Deblouw	Muskegon	Calgary	7th, 186th
2012	Colton Hargrove	Fargo	Boston	7th, 205th
Year	Name	USHL Team	NHL team	Round, Overall
2011	J. T. Miller	U.S. NTDP	NY Rangers	1st, 15th
2011	Connor Murphy	U.S. NTDP	Phoenix	1st, 20th
2011	Tyler Biggs	U.S. NTDP	Toronto	1st, 22nd
2011	Rocco Grimaldi	U.S. NTDP	Florida	2nd, 33rd
2011	Scott Mayfield	Youngstown	NY Islanders	2nd, 34th
2011	John Gibson	U.S. NTDP	Anaheim	2nd, 39th
2011	Michael Paliotta	U.S. NTDP	Chicago	3rd, 70th
2011	Blake Coleman	Indiana	New Jersey	3rd, 75th
2011	Andy Welinski	Green Bay	Anaheim	3rd, 83rd
2011	Robbie Russo	U.S. NTDP	NY Islanders	4th, 95th
2011	Josiah Didier	Cedar Rapids	Montreal	4th, 97th
2011	Reid Boucher	U.S. NTDP	New Jersey	4th, 99th
2011	Johnny Gaudreau	Dubuque	Calgary	4th, 104th
2011	Brian Ferlin	Indiana	Boston	4th, 121st
2011	Seth Ambroz	Omaha	Columbus	5th, 128th
2011	Blake Pietila	U.S. NTDP	New Jersey	5th, 129th
2011	Sean Kuraly	Indiana	San Jose	5th, 133rd
2011	Max McCormick	Sioux City	Ottawa	6th, 171st
2011	Travis Boyd	U.S. NTDP	Washington	6th, 177th
2011	Adam Wilcox	Green Bay	Tampa Bay	6th, 178th
2011	Aaron Harstad	Green Bay	Winnipeg	7th, 187th
2011	Zac Larazza	U.S. NTDP	Phoenix	7th, 196th
2011	Alex Broadhurst	Green Bay	Chicago	7th, 199th
2011	Ryan Dzingel	Lincoln	Ottawa	7th, 204th
2011	Garrett Haar	Fargo	Washington	7th, 207th
Year	Name	USHL Team	NHL team	Round, Overall
2010	Jack Campbell	U.S. NTDP	Dallas	1st, 11th
2010	Jaden Schwartz	Tri-City	St. Louis	1st, 14th
2010	Derek Forbort	U.S. NTDP	Los Angeles	1st, 15th
2010	Jarred Tinordi	U.S. NTDP	Montreal	1st, 22nd
2010	Justin Faulk	U.S. NTDP	Carolina	2nd, 37th
2010	Jon Merrill	U.S. NTDP	New Jersey	2nd, 38th
2010	Connor Brickley	Des Moines	Florida	2nd, 50th
2010	Jason Zucker	U.S. NTDP	Minnesota	2nd, 59th
2010	Stephen Johns	U.S. NTDP	Chicago	2nd, 60th
2010	Bryan Rust	U.S. NTDP	Pittsburgh	3rd, 80th
2010	Bill Arnold	U.S. NTDP	Calgary	4th, 108th
2010	Kevin Gravel	Sioux City	Los Angeles	5th, 148th
2010	Michael Parks	Cedar Rapids	Philadelphia	5th, 149th
2010	Yasin Cisse	Des Moines	Atlanta	5th, 150th
2010	Anthony Bitetto	Indiana	Nashville	6th, 168th
2010	Kevin Lind	Chicago	Anaheim	6th, 177th
2010	Nick Mattson	Indiana	Chicago	6th, 180th
2010	Bryce Aneloski	Cedar Rapids	Ottawa	7th, 196th
2010	Luke Moffatt	U.S. NTDP	Colorado	7th, 197th
2010	Chris Crane	Green Bay	San Jose	7th, 200th
Year	Name	USHL Team	NHL team	Round, Overall
2009	Louis Leblanc	Omaha	Montreal	1st, 18
2009	John Moore	Chicago	Columbus	1st, 21
2009	Alex Chiasson	Des Moines	Dallas	2nd, 38
2009	Philip Samuelsson	Chicago	Pittsburgh	2nd, 61
2009	Josh Birkholz	Fargo	Florida	3rd, 67
2009	Mike Lee	Fargo	Phoenix	3rd, 91
2009	Craig Smith	Waterloo	Nashville	4th, 98
2009	Seth Helgeson	Sioux City	New Jersey	4th, 114
2009	Patrick Wey	Waterloo	Nashville	4th, 115
2009	Radoslav Illo	Tri-City	Anaheim	5th, 136
2009	Jeff Costello	Cedar Rapids	Ottawa	5th, 146
2009	Nick Jensen	Green Bay	Detroit	5th, 150
2009	Michael Sdao	Lincoln	Ottawa	7th, 191
2009	Paul Phillips	Cedar Rapids	Chicago	7th, 195
2009	Mike Cichy	Indiana	Montreal	7th, 199
2009	Jordan Samuels-Thomas	Waterloo	Atlanta	7th, 203
Year	Name	USHL Team	NHL team	Round, Overall
2008	John Carlson	Indiana	Washington	1st, 27
2008	Patrick Wiercioch	Omaha	Ottawa	2nd, 42
2008	Jimmy Hayes	Lincoln	Toronto	2nd, 60
2008	Steve Qualier	Sioux City	Montreal	3rd, 86
2008	Scott Winkler	Cedar Rapids	Dallas	3rd, 89
2008	Max Nicastro	Chicago	Detroit	3rd, 91
2008	Matt Donovan	Cedar Rapids	New York Islanders	4th, 96
2008	Nicholas Larson	Waterloo	Calgary	4th, 108
2008	Greg Pateryn	Ohio	Toronto	5th, 128
2008	Luke Witkowsi	Ohio	Tampa Bay	6th, 160
2008	Matthew Bartowski	Lincoln	Florida	7th, 190
Year	Name	USHL Team	NHL team	Round, Overall
2007	Max Pacioretty	Sioux City	Montreal	1st, 22
2007	Patrick White	Tri-City	Vancouver	1st, 25
2007	Nick Petrecki	Omaha	San Jose	1st, 28
2007	Tommy Cross	Ohio	Boston	2nd, 35
2007	Aaron Palushaj	Des Moines	St. Louis	2nd, 44
2007	Colby Cohen	Lincoln	Colorado	2nd, 45
2007	Nico Sacchetti	Omaha	Dallas	2nd, 50
2007	Will Weber	Chicago	Columbus	2nd, 53
Year	Name	USHL Team	NHL team	Round, Overall
2006	Kyle Okposo	Des Moines	NY Islanders	1st, 7
2006	Trevor Lewis	Des Moines	Los Angeles	1st, 17
2006	Carl Sneep	Lincoln	Pittsburgh	2nd, 32
2006	Andreas Nodl	Sioux Falls	Philadelphia	2nd, 39
2006	Jeff Petry	Des Moines	Edmonton	2nd, 45
2006	Eric Gryba	Green Bay	Ottawa	3rd, 68
2006	Jeff Zatkoff	Sioux City	Los Angeles	3rd, 74
2006	Michael Forney	Des Moines	Atlanta	3rd, 80
2006	Ryan Turek	Omaha	St. Louis	4th, 94
2006	Kyle Medvec	Sioux City	Minnesota	4th, 102
2006	Derrick LaPoint	Green Bay	Florida	4th, 116
2006	Richard Bachman	Chicago	Dallas	4th, 120
2006	Andy Sackrison	Tri-City	St. Louis	5th, 124
2006	Shane Sims	Des Moines	NY Islanders	5th, 126
2006	David Meckler	Waterloo	Los Angeles	5th, 134
2006	Alex Kangas	Sioux Falls/Indiana	Atlanta	5th, 135
2006	Jan-Mikael Juutilainen	Waterloo	Chicago	6th, 156
2006	Brent Gwidt	Indiana	Washington	6th, 157
2006	Troy Mattila	Chicago	NY Islanders	7th, 190
2006	Nick Oslund	Tri-City	Detroit	7th, 191
2006	Jesse Martin	Tri-City	Atlanta	7th, 195
2006	Billy Sauer	Chicago	Colorado	7th, 201
2006	John McCarthy	Des Moines	San Jose	7th, 202
2006	Jay Barriball	Sioux Falls	San Jose	7th, 203
2006	Eric Condra	Lincoln	Ottawa	7th, 211
Year	Name	USHL Team	NHL team	Round, Overall
2005	Brian Lee	Lincoln	Ottawa	1st, 9
2005	T. J. Oshie	Sioux Falls	St. Louis	1st, 24
2005	Joe Finley	Sioux Falls	Washington	1st, 27
2005	Justin Abdelkader	Cedar Rapids	Detroit	2nd, 42
2005	Paul Stastny	Omaha	Colorado	2nd, 44
2005	Robby Dee	Omaha	Edmonton	3rd, 86
2005	Chris Butler	Sioux City	Buffalo	4th, 96
2005	Chris VandeVelde	Lincoln	Edmonton	4th, 97
2005	Jared Boll	Lincoln	Columbus	4th, 101
2005	Andrew Thomas	Waterloo	Washington	4th, 109
2005	Alex Stalock	Cedar Rapids	San Jose	4th, 112
2005	Nathan Gerbe	Omaha	Buffalo	5th, 142
2005	Joe Fallon	Cedar Rapids	Chicago	6th, 167
2005	Justin Mercier	St. Louis	Colorado	6th, 168
2005	Greg Beller	Green Bay	NY Rangers	6th, 178
2005	Tim Kennedy	Sioux City	Washington	6th, 181
2005	Joe Charlesbois	Sioux City	Chicago	6th, 188
2005	Tony Lucia	Omaha	San Jose	6th, 193
2005	Joe Vitale	Sioux Falls	Pittsburgh	7th, 195
2005	Kyle Lawson	Tri-City	Carolina	7th, 198
2005	Josh Meyers	Sioux City	Los Angeles	7th, 206
2005	Matt Clackson	Chicago	Philadelphia	7th, 215
2005	Brock Bradford	Omaha	Boston	7th, 217
2005	Pat McGann	Cedar Rapids	Dallas	7th, 223
2005	Zach Bearson	Waterloo	Florida	7th, 224
2005	Chad Rau	Des Moines	Toronto	7th, 228
Year	Name	USHL Team	NHL team	Round, Overall
2004	Blake Wheeler	Green Bay	Phoenix	1st, 5
2004	Victor Oreskovich	Green Bay	Colorado	2nd, 55
2004	Geoff Paukovich	Tri-City	Edmonton	2nd, 57
2004	Alex Goligoski	Sioux Falls	Pittsburgh	2nd, 61
2004	Kyle Klubertanz	Green Bay	Anaheim	3rd, 74
2004	Brian Gifford	Indiana	Pittsburgh	3rd, 85
2004	Wes O'Neill	Green Bay	NY Islanders	4th, 115
2004	Jim McKenzie	Sioux Falls	Ottawa	5th, 141
2004	Chris Zarb	Tri-City	Philadelphia	5th, 144
2004	Tyler Haskins	Sioux City	Detroit	5th, 162
2004	Scott Parse	Tri-City	Los Angeles	6th, 174
2004	Derek Peltier	Cedar Rapids	Colorado	6th, 184
2004	Chris Peluso	Sioux Falls	Pittsburgh	7th, 194
2004	Matt Schneider	Twin Cities	Calgary	7th, 200
2004	Mike Curry	Sioux City	Los Angeles	7th, 205
2004	Jimmy Spratt	Sioux City	Calgary	7th, 213
2004	Sergei Kukushkin	Indiana	Dallas	7th, 218
2004	Matt Greer	Des Moines	Columbus	8th, 233
2004	Nathan Perkovich	Cedar Rapids	New Jersey	8th, 250
2004	Matt McIlvane	Chicago	Ottawa	8th, 251
2004	Matt Ford	Sioux Falls	Chicago	8th, 256
2004	Travis Morin	Chicago	Washington	9th, 263
2004	Spencer Dillon	Green Bay	Florida	9th, 267
2004	Luke Beaverson	Green Bay	Florida	9th, 283
Year	Name	USHL Team	NHL team	Round, Overall
2003	Thomas Vanek	Sioux Falls	Buffalo	1st, 5
2003	Danny Richmond	Chicago	Carolina	2nd, 31
2003	Matt Carle	River City	San Jose	2nd, 47
2003	David Backes	Lincoln	St. Louis	2nd, 62
2003	Danny Irmen	Lincoln	Minnesota	3rd, 78
2003	Ryan Potulny	Lincoln	Philadelphia	3rd, 87
2003	Mike Vannelli	Sioux Falls	Atlanta	4th, 126
2003	Matej Trojovsky	Lincoln	Carolina	4th, 130
2003	Tim Cook	River City	Ottawa	5th, 142
2003	Thomas Morrow	Des Moines	Buffalo	5th, 150
2003	Gino Guyer	Lincoln	Dallas	5th, 165
2003	Drew Miller	River City	Anaheim	6th, 186
2003	Joe Pavelski	Waterloo	San Jose	7th, 205
2003	Dirk Southern	Lincoln	Anaheim	7th, 218
2003	Jamie Hoffmann	Des Moines	Carolina	8th, 230
2003	Joe Jensen	Sioux Falls	Pittsburgh	8th, 232
2003	Cody Blanshan	Sioux Falls	NY Islanders	8th, 238
2003	Brady Greco	Chicago	Tampa Bay	8th, 256
2003	Marty Guerin	Des Moines	Los Angeles	9th, 274
2003	Michael Grenzy	Chicago	Chicago	9th, 275
2003	Chris Porter	Lincoln	Chicago	9th, 282
Year	Name	USHL Team	NHL team	Round, Overall
2002	Keith Ballard	Omaha	Buffalo	1st, 11
2002	Matt Greene	Green Bay	Edmonton	2nd, 44
2002	Brett Skinner	Des Moines	Vancouver	3rd, 68
2002	Mike Erickson	Des Moines	Minnesota	3rd, 72
2002	Matt Jones	Green Bay	Phoenix	3rd, 80
2002	Jesse Lane	Des Moines	Carolina	3rd, 91
2002	Jeff Genovy	Des Moines	Columbus	3rd, 96
2002	Marty Magers	Omaha	Buffalo	4th, 121
2002	Nate Guenin	Green Bay	NY Rangers	4th, 127
2002	Tom Gilbert	Chicago	Colorado	4th, 129
2002	John Zeiler	Sioux City	Phoenix	5th, 132
2002	Joseph Pearce	Chicago	Tampa Bay	5th, 135
2002	Andrew Sertich	Sioux Falls	Pittsburgh	5th, 136
2002	Vince Bellissimo	Topeka	Florida	5th, 158
2002	P. J. Atherton	Cedar Rapids	Tampa Bay	6th, 170
2002	Bobby Goepfert	Cedar Rapids	Pittsburgh	6th, 171
2002	Jake Taylor	Green Bay	NY Rangers	6th, 177
2002	Marian Havel	Sioux City	Washington	6th, 179
2002	Kim Hirschovits	Chicago	NY Rangers	6th, 194
2002	Tim Conboy	Topeka	San Jose	7th, 217
2002	Joey Crabb	Green Bay	NY Rangers	7th, 226
2002	Yan Stastny	Omaha	Boston	8th, 259
2002	Adam Burish	Green Bay	Chicago	9th, 282
2002	Michael Hutchins	Des Moines	San Jose	9th, 288
Year	Name	USHL Team	NHL team	Round, Overall
2001	Tim Jackman	Twin Cities	Columbus	2nd, 38
2001	Per Mars	Lincoln	Colorado	3rd, 87
2001	Patrick Sharp	Thunder Bay	Philadelphia	3rd, 95
2001	Bryce Lampman	Omaha	NY Rangers	4th, 113
2001	Colin Stuart	Lincoln	Atlanta	5th, 135
2001	David Klema	Des Moines	Phoenix	5th, 148
2001	Bernd Bruckler	Tri-City	Philadelphia	5th, 150
2001	Andy Schneider	Lincoln	Pittsburgh	5th, 156
2001	Andrew Alberts	Waterloo	Boston	6th, 179
2001	Scott Polaski	Sioux City	Phoenix	6th, 180
2001	Art Femenella	Sioux City	Tampa Bay	6th, 186
2001	James Massen	Sioux Falls	New Jersey	6th, 194
2001	Jan Chovan	Sioux City	Toronto	7th, 213
2001	David Moss	Cedar Rapids	Calgary	7th, 220
2001	Brandon Bochenski	Lincoln	Ottawa	7th, 223
2001	Joe Campbell	Des Moines	Calgary	8th, 233
2001	Jeff Miles	Thunder Bay	Chicago	9th, 268
Year	Name	USHL Team	NHL team	Round, Overall
2000	Rostislav Klesla	Sioux City	Columbus	1st, 4
2000	David Hale	Sioux City	New Jersey	1st, 22
2000	Jeff Taffe	Rochester	St. Louis	1st, 30
2000	Libor Ustrnul	Thunder Bay	Atlanta	2nd, 42
2000	Matt DeMarchi	North Iowa	New Jersey	2nd, 57
2000	Dan Ellis	Omaha	Dallas	2nd, 60
2000	Jozef Balej	Rochester	Montreal	3rd, 78
2000	Kurt Sauer	North Iowa	Colorado	3rd, 88
2000	Tim Branham	Rochester	Vancouver	3rd, 93
2000	Derrick Byfuglien	Fargo-Moorhead	Ottawa	4th, 122
2000	Troy Riddle	Des Moines	St. Louis	4th, 129
2000	Mike Stuart	Rochester	Nashville	5th, 137
2000	Matt Koalska	Twin Cities	Nashville	5th, 154
2000	Grant Potulny	Lincoln	Ottawa	5th, 157
2000	Michael Ayers	Dubuque	Chicago	6th, 177
2000	Josh Olson	Omaha	Florida	6th, 190
2000	Joey Martin	Omaha	Chicago	6th, 193
2000	Janne Jokila	River City	Colorado	7th, 200
2000	Ryan Caldwell	Thunder Bay	NY Islanders	7th, 202
2000	Jure Penko	Green Bay	Nashville	7th, 203
2000	John Eichelberger	Green Bay	Philadelphia	7th, 210
2000	Lubos Velebny	Waterloo	Toronto	7th, 223
2000	Adam Berkhoel	Twin Cities	Chicago	8th, 240
2000	Jason Platt	Omaha	Edmonton	8th, 247
Year	Name	USHL Team	NHL team	Round, Overall
1999	Ed Hill	Green Bay	Nashville	2nd, 61
1999	Peter Smrek	Des Moines	St. Louis	3rd, 85
1999	Ryan Malone	Omaha	Pittsburgh	4th, 115
1999	Matt Doman	Dubuque	Calgary	5th, 135
1999	Matt Shasby	Des Moines	Montreal	5th, 150
1999	Stephen Baby	Green Bay	Atlanta	7th, 188
1999	Phil Osaer	Waterloo	St. Louis	7th, 203
1999	Chris Hartsburg	Omaha	New Jersey	7th, 214
1999	Miroslav Durak	Des Moines	Nashville	8th, 220
1999	Jeff Finger	Green Bay	Colorado	8th, 240
1999	Noah Clarke	Des Moines	Los Angeles	9th, 250
1999	Georgjs Pujacs	Rochester	Boston	9th, 264
Year	Name	USHL Team	NHL team	Round, Overall
1998	Erik Cole	Des Moines	Carolina	3rd, 71
1998	Justin Morrison	Omaha	Vancouver	3rd, 81
1998	Kent Sauer	North Iowa	Nashville	4th, 88
1998	Josh Blackburn	Dubuque/Lincoln	Phoenix	5th, 116
1998	Erik Wendell	Twin Cities	Washington	5th, 125
1998	Tyler Arnason	Fargo-Moorhead	Chicago	7th, 183
1998	Erik Jensen	Des Moines	New Jersey	7th, 199
1998	Toby Peterson	Fargo-Moorhead	Pittsburgh	9th, 244
1998	John Pohl	Twin Cities	St. Louis	9th, 255
Year	Name	USHL Team	NHL team	Round, Overall
1997	Ben Clymer	Rochester	Boston	2nd, 27
1997	Brian Gaffaney	North Iowa	Pittsburgh	2nd, 44
1997	Josh Langfeld	Lincoln	Ottawa	3rd, 66
1997	Joe Corvo	Omaha	Los Angeles	4th, 83
1997	Aaron Miskovich	Green Bay	Colorado	5th, 133
1997	Heath Gordon	Green Bay	Chicago	6th, 147
1997	Mat Snesrud	North Iowa	Anaheim	7th, 181
1997	Jeremy Adduono	Thunder Bay	Buffalo	7th 184
1997	Jay Kopischke	North Iowa	Los Angeles	8th, 193
1997	Bobby Haglund	Des Moines	St. Louis	8th, 206
1997	Doug Schueller	Twin Cities	Florida	8th, 211
1997	Scott Clemmensen	Des Moines	New Jersey	8th, 215
1997	Doug Schmidt	Waterloo	Colorado	8th, 217
1997	Ryan Clark	Lincoln	NY Islanders	9th, 222
1997	Eric Lind	Des Moines	Pittsburgh	9th, 234
Year	Name	USHL Team	NHL team	Round, Overall
1996	Josh DeWolf	Twin Cities	New Jersey	2nd, 41
1996	Jason Sessa	Rochester	Toronto	4th, 86
1996	Chris Bogas	Omaha	Toronto	6th, 148
1996	Andrew Van Bruggen	Sioux City	Washington	6th, 153
1996	Reggie Berg	Des Moines	Toronto	7th, 178
1996	Nick Lent	Omaha	Phoenix	8th, 200
1996	John Hultberg	Dubuque	Edmonton	9th, 221
Year	Name	USHL Team	NHL team	Round, Overall
1995	Marc Magliarditi	Des Moines	Chicago	6th, 146
1995	Scott Swanson	Omaha	Washington	9th, 225
Year	Name	USHL Team	NHL team	Round, Overall
1994	Ryan Johnson	Thunder Bay	Florida	2nd, 36
1994	Jon Gaskins	Dubuque	Edmonton	5th, 110
1994	Brian Swanson	Omaha	San Jose	5th, 115
1994	Mark Welsing	Wisconsin	Anaheim	7th, 158
1994	Rob Butler	Sioux City	Toronto	8th, 204
1994	John Grahame	Sioux City	Boston	9th, 229
1994	Jeff Mikesch	Dubuque	Detroit	9th, 231
1994	Mike Peluso	Omaha	Calgary	10th, 253
1994	Scott Swanjord	Sioux City/Waterloo	New Jersey	10th, 259
1994	Jim Roy	Thunder Bay	Dallas	10th, 254
1994	Mike Hanson	Des Moines	New Jersey	11th, 269
1994	Brian Leitza	Sioux City	Pittsburgh	11th, 284
Year	Name	USHL Team	NHL team	Round, Overall
1993	Landon Wilson	Dubuque	Toronto	1st, 19
1993	Ethan Philpott	Des Moines	Buffalo	3rd, 64
1993	Dan Tompkins	Omaha	Calgary	3rd, 70
1993	Dieter Kochan	Sioux City	Vancouver	4th, 98
1993	Matt Peterson	North Iowa	Anaheim	7th, 160
1993	Dan Hendrickson	St. Paul	Washington	7th, 173
1993	Eddy Campbell	Omaha	NY Rangers	8th, 190
1993	Joel Prpic	Waterloo	Boston	9th, 233
1993	Cory Peterson	Wisconsin	Dallas	11th, 269
1993	Ken Hemenway	Omaha	Philadelphia	11th, 270
1993	John Hillman	St. Paul	Quebec	11th, 283
1993	Brent Peterson	Thunder Bay	Tampa Bay	1st, 3 (S)
1993	Wayne Strachan	Thunder Bay	NY Rangers	1st, 8 (S)
Year	Name	USHL Team	NHL team	Round, Overall
1992	David Wilkie	Omaha	Montreal	1st, 20
1992	Chris Ferraro	Dubuque/Waterloo	NY Rangers	1st, 24
1992	Peter Ferraro	Dubuque/Waterloo	NY Rangers	4th, 85
1992	Chuck Wasley	St. Paul	Quebec	5th, 100
1992	Kirk Daubenspeck	Sioux City	Philadelphia	7th, 151
1992	Kyle Peterson	Thunder Bay	Minnesota	7th, 154
1992	Matt Oates	Omaha	NY Rangers	7th, 168
1992	Nick Naumenko	Dubuque/Rochester	St. Louis	8th, 182
1992	Justin Krall	Omaha	Detroit	8th, 183
1992	Chris Burns	Thunder Bay	San Jose	9th, 195
1992	Richard Shulmistra	Thunder Bay	Quebec	1st, 4 (S)
Year	Name	USHL Team	NHL team	Round, Overall
1991	Sean Pronger	Thunder Bay	Vancouver	3rd, 51
1991	Brian Caruso	Thunder Bay	Calgary	3rd, 63
1991	Brad Willner	St. Paul	New Jersey	4th, 77
1991	Tony Prpic	Sioux City	Montreal	5th, 105
1991	Dean Grillo	Waterloo	San Jose	8th, 155
1991	Robb McIntyre	Dubuque	Toronto	8th, 164
1991	Gary Kitching	Thunder Bay	Edmonton	8th, 166
1991	Chris Kenady	St. Paul/Rochester	St. Louis	8th, 175
1991	Corwin Saurdiff	Waterloo	San Jose	9th, 177
1991	Derek Herlofsky	St. Paul	Minnesota	9th, 184
1991	Jeff Lembke	Omaha	Pittsburgh	9th, 192
1991	Brent Brekke	Rochester	Quebec	10th, 188
1991	Paul Koch	Omaha	Quebec	10th, 200
1991	Paul Lepler	Rochester	Montreal	11th, 237
1991	Dale Hooper	Omaha	Montreal	12th, 259
1991	Chris Hynnes	Thunder Bay	Quebec	2nd, 24 (S)
Year	Name	USHL Team	NHL team	Round, Overall
1990	Glen Mears	Rochester	Calgary	3rd, 62
1990	Kurt Miller	Rochester	St. Louis	6th, 117
1990	Jeff Levy	Rochester	Minnesota	7th, 134
1990	Mike Power	Thunder Bay	Edmonton	7th, 143
1990	John Gruden	Waterloo	Boston	8th, 168
1990	Greg Hanson	Dubuque	Philadelphia	10th, 193
1990	Jon Hillebrandt	Madison	NY Rangers	10th, 202
1990	J. P. McKersie	Dubuque	Minnesota	12th, 239
Year	Name	USHL Team	NHL team	Round, Overall
1989	Greg Johnson	Thunder Bay	Philadelphia	2nd, 33
1989	Richard Borgo	Thunder Bay	Edmonton	2nd, 39
1989	Mark Markovich	Rochester	Pittsburgh	6th, 121
1989	Jon Pratt	Rochester	Minnesota	8th, 154
1989	Derek Plante	Madison	Buffalo	8th, 161
1989	Glen Wisser	North Iowa	Philadelphia	9th, 180
1989	Joe Larson	St. Paul	Winnipeg	10th, 193
1989	Greg Hagen	St. Paul	Pittsburgh	10th, 205
1989	Todd Henderson	Thunder Bay	Buffalo	11th, 224
1989	Joe Frederick	Madison	Detroit	12th, 242
Year	Name	USHL Team	NHL team	Round, Overall
1988	Chris Nelson	Rochester	New Jersey	5th, 96
1988	Chad Johnson	Rochester	New Jersey	6th, 117
1988	John McCoy	St. Paul	St. Louis	8th, 156
1988	Dan Ruoho	Madison	Buffalo	8th, 160
1988	Shjon Podein	Rochester	Edmonton	8th, 166
1988	Brett Peterson	St. Paul	Calgary	9th, 189
1988	Doug Laprade	Thunder Bay	Los Angeles	11th, 217
1988	Heath Deboer	St. Paul	St. Louis	11th, 219
1988	Scott Billey	Madison	Philadelphia	11th, 224
Year	Name	USHL Team	NHL team	Round, Overall
1987	Joe Harwell	Madison	Winnipeg	6th, 121
1987	Mark Strapon	St. Paul	Philadelphia	7th, 146
1987	Eric Burrill	St. Paul	NY Rangers	9th, 178
1987	Mark Osiecki	Madison	Calgary	9th, 187
1987	Roger Rougelot	Madison	Winnipeg	11th, 226
1987	Dan Brettschneider	Madison	Washington	11th, 240
1987	Bryan Herring	Dubuque	Montreal	12th, 248
1987	Dave Snuggerud	Bloomington	Buffalo	1st, 1 (S)
1987	Mike de Carle	Austin	Buffalo	2nd, 6 (S)
Year	Name	USHL Team	NHL team	Round, Overall
1986	John Blue	Des Moines	Winnipeg	10th, 197
1986	Shaun Sabol	St. Paul	Philadelphia	11th, 209
1986	Tom Bissett	Waterloo	Detroit	11th, 211
1986	Steve MacSwain	Dubuque	Calgary	1st, 4 (S)
1986	Chris LeVasseur	Austin	Winnipeg	1st, 24 (S)
Year	Name	USHL Team	NHL team	Round, Overall
1985	Tim Sweeney	Madison	Calgary	6th, 122
1985	John Byce	Madison	Boston	11th, 220
Year	Name	USHL Team	NHL team	Round, Overall
1984	Gary Suter	Dubuque	Calgary	9th, 180
1984	Mark Lanigan	Waterloo	St. Louis	12th, 237
Year	Name	USHL Team	NHL team	Round, Overall
1983	Harry Armstrong	Dubuque	Winnipeg	5th, 89
1983	Kory Wright	Dubuque	Winnipeg	10th, 189
1983	Jamie Husgen	Des Moines	Winnipeg	12th, 229
Year	Name	USHL Team	NHL team	Round, Overall
1982	Phil Housley	St. Paul	Buffalo	1st, 6
1982	Brian Williams	Sioux City	Montreal	9th, 187
1982	Dan Dorion	Austin	New Jersey	12th, 232
1982	Mark Vichorek	Sioux City	Philadelphia	12th, 245
Year	Name	USHL Team	NHL team	Round, Overall
1981	Rick Zombo	Austin	Detroit	8th, 149

== Sources ==
- USHL 2006-07 Media Guide
