= Jack Hillman (disambiguation) =

Jack Hillman was a footballer.

Jack Hillman may also refer to:

- Jack Charles Hillman, Alberta politician
- Jack Hillman, character in The Love Hermit

== See also ==
- John Hillman (disambiguation)
