= High Road Bridge =

- Coordinates: 41.62608°N 88.04622°W
- Carries: Motor vehicles
- Crosses: Long Run Creek
- Locale: Lockport Township, Will County, Illinois

Characteristics
- Design: Beam bridge
- Material: Hybrid composite beams (HCB)
- Total length: 17.4 metres (57 ft)
- No. of spans: 1
- Design life: 80 to 100 years

History
- Designer: Teng & Associates Inc. of Chicago
- Constructed by: Herlihy Mid-Continent Company and Harbor Technologies Inc (HCB beams)
- Construction end: August 2008
- Replaces: 1935-2008 bridge

The High Road Bridge is a road bridge over Long Run Creek in Lockport Township, Illinois. It is the world's first road bridge built using the hybrid composite beams (also known as Hillman-Composite Beam) (HCB's) invented by John R. Hillman and developed by the HC Bridge Company LLC. The HCB's are stronger, lighter and more corrosion resistant than the traditional concrete or steel beams. The HCB beam with a life span of 80 to 100 years and with minimal or no maintenance to the bridge girders is a cost competitive alternative to steel and concrete beam.

It was designed by Teng & Associates and constructed by Herlihy Mid-Continent Company in 2008. The 17.4 m (57 ft) long, single-span bridge consists of six HCBs supporting a conventional 20 cm (8 in) thick reinforced concrete deck.
