= Credit Union Place =

Multipurpose arena in Manitoba, Canada

Coordinates: 51.1472°N 100.0484°W

The Credit Union Place is a 1,763-seat multipurpose arena located in Dauphin, Manitoba. The arena is part of the Parkland Recreation Complex, which also includes a curling rink and an aquatic centre.

The arena opened in April 2006, at a cost of $8.6 million. It is home to the Manitoba Junior Hockey League's Dauphin Kings and was the host site for the 2010 Royal Bank Cup, 2014 Western Canada Cup, and 2015 Telus Cup regional championships. Credit Union Place has also served as the home of the Brandon Wheat Kings for the Conference Quarter Final round of the 2017 and 2018 Western Hockey League playoffs due to the Royal Manitoba Winter Fair taking place at the Keystone Centre in Brandon during that time.

Aside from hockey, it also hosts concerts and trade shows.
