= 2015 Telus Cup =

Tournament details
- Venue(s): Centre Premier Tech in Rivière-du-Loup, QC
- Dates: April 20 – 26, 2015
- Teams: 6

Final positions
- Champions: Toronto Young Nationals
- Runners-up: Grenadiers de Châteauguay
- Third place: Regina Pat Canadians

Tournament statistics
- Scoring leader: Owen Sillinger (6G 11A 17P)

Awards
- MVP: Owen Sillinger

The 2015 Telus Cup was Canada's 37th annual national midget 'AAA' hockey championship, played April 20 – 26, 2015 at Rivière-du-Loup, Quebec. The Toronto Young Nationals defeated Grenadiers de Châteauguay in the final to win the gold medal. The Regina Pat Canadians won the bronze medal.

== Teams ==
Result	Team	Region	City
1st place, gold medalist(s)	Toronto Young Nationals	Central	Toronto, ON
2nd place, silver medalist(s)	Grenadiers de Châteauguay	Quebec	Châteauguay, QC
3rd place, bronze medalist(s)	Regina Pat Canadians	West	Regina, SK
4	UFA Bisons	Pacific	Strathmore, AB
5	Albatros du Collège Notre-Dame	Host	Rivière-du-Loup, QC
6	Newbridge Academy Gladiators	Atlantic	Dartmouth, NS

== Round robin ==
Pos	Team	Pld	W	L	D	GF	GA	GD	Pts
1	Regina Pat Canadians	5	4	0	1	25	10	+15	9
2	Grenadiers de Châteauguay	5	4	1	0	20	13	+7	8
3	Strathmore Bisons	5	3	2	0	23	15	+8	6
4	Toronto Young Nationals	5	2	3	0	14	20	−6	4
5	Albatros du Collège Notre-Dame	5	1	4	0	12	22	−10	2
6	Newbridge Academy Gladiators	5	0	4	1	9	23	−14	1

Tiebreaker: Head-to-head record, most wins, highest goal differential.

Schedule and Results
Game	Away team	Score	Home team	Score	Notes	Date
1	Regina	7	Toronto	2	Final	April 20
2	Châteauguay	5	Strathmore	3	Final	April 20
3	Newbridge Academy	0	Collège Notre-Dame	4	Final	April 20
4	Regina	5	Châteauguay	0	Final	April 21
5	Toronto	5	Newbridge Academy	2	Final	April 21
6	Collège Notre-Dame	1	Strathmore	7	Final	April 21
7	Newbridge Academy	2	Châteauguay	5	Final	April 22
8	Strathmore	2	Regina	4	Final	April 22
9	Toronto	3	Collège Notre-Dame	2	Final	April 22
10	Strathmore	6	Newbridge Academy	2	Final	April 23
11	Châteauguay	4	Toronto	1	Final	April 23
12	Collège Notre-Dame	3	Regina	6	Final	April 23
13	Strathmore	5	Toronto	3	Final	April 24
14	Newbridge Academy	3	Regina	3	Final	April 24
15	Châteauguay	6	Collège Notre-Dame	2	Final	April 24

== Playoffs ==
Semifinals
1	Regina	1
4	Toronto	3
2	Châteauguay	7
3	UFA	1

Gold Medal Game
2	Châteauguay	2
4	Toronto	6
Bronze Medal Game
1	Regina	6
3	UFA	3

== Individual awards ==
- Most Valuable Player: Owen Sillinger (Regina)
- Top Scorer: Owen Sillinger (Regina)
- Top Forward: Owen Sillinger (Regina)
- Top Defenceman: Jake Tesarowski (Regina)
- Top Goaltender: Kyle Jessiman (Châteauguay)
- Most Sportsmanlike Player: Mathieu Samuel (Collège Notre-Dame)
- Esso Scholarship: Mikael Recine (Châteauguay)

== Road to the Telus Cup ==
=== Atlantic Region ===
The Newbridge Academy Gladiators advanced to the Telus Cup by winning tournament held April 2 – 5, 2015 at the Community Gardens Arena in Kensington, Prince Edward Island.

Round Robin
Pos	Qualification	Team	Pld	W	L	D	GF	GA	GD	Pts
1	NBPEIMMHL	Moncton Flyers	4	3	0	1	20	9	+11	7
2	NSMMHL	Newbridge Academy Gladiators	4	2	0	2	12	8	+4	6
3	Host	Kensington Wild	4	2	1	1	18	17	+1	5
4	NBPEIMMHL	Charlottetown Islanders	4	1	3	0	9	16	−7	2
5	NLMMHL	St. John's Maple Leafs	4	0	4	0	8	17	−9	0

Championship Game
Away team	Score	Home team	Score
Newbridge Academy (2)	4	Moncton (1)	3

=== Québec ===
The Grenadiers de Châteauguay advanced to the Telus Cup by winning the Quebec Midget AAA Hockey League championship series.

Best-of-7 series
Pos	Team	Pld	W	L	GF	GA	GD
1	Grenadiers de Châteauguay	4	4	0	24	8	+16
2	Lions du Lac St-Louis	4	0	4	8	24	−16

=== Central Region ===
The Toronto Young Nationals advanced to the Telus Cup by winning tournament held March 30 – April 5, 2015 at the Westwood Arena in Toronto, Ontario.

Round Robin
Pos	Qualification	Team	Pld	W	L	D	GF	GA	GD	Pts
1	Host	Toronto Young Nationals	5	5	0	0	34	10	+24	10
2	OMHA	Whitby Wildcats	5	3	1	1	19	15	+4	7
3	Alliance	London Jr. Knights	5	2	2	1	17	15	+2	5
4	HEO	Ottawa Senators	5	2	3	0	13	22	−9	4
5	GTHL	Don Mills Flyers	5	0	2	3	12	17	−5	3
6	GNML	Sault Ste. Marie Thunderbirds	5	0	4	1	11	27	−16	1

Playoff Round
Game	Away team	Score	Home team	Score
Semi 1	Ottawa (4)	2	Toronto (1)	5
Semi 2	London (3)	6	Whitby (2)	2
Bronze	Ottawa (4)	1	Whitby (2)	2
Gold	London (3)	0	Toronto (1)	3

=== West Region ===
The Regina Pat Canadians advanced to the Telus Cup by winning tournament held April 2 – 5, 2015 at Credit Union Place in Dauphin, Manitoba.

Round Robin
Pos	Qualification	Team	Pld	W	L	D	GF	GA	GD	Pts
1	MMAAAHL	Pembina Valley Hawks	3	2	0	1	11	5	+6	5
2	SMAAAHL	Regina Pat Canadians	3	1	1	1	6	8	−2	3
3	HNO	Kenora Thistles	3	1	1	1	9	7	+2	3
4	Host	Parkland Rangers	3	0	2	1	6	12	−6	1

Championship Game
Away team	Score	Home team	Score
Regina (2)	7	Pembina Valley (1)	1

=== Pacific Region ===
The Strathmore Bisons advanced to the Telus Cup by winning the best-of-3 playoff series held April 3 – 5, 2015 at the Doug Mitchell Thunderbird Sports Centre in Vancouver, British Columbia.

Best-of-3 series
Pos	Qualification	Team	Pld	W	L	GF	GA	GD
1	AMHL	UFA Bisons	2	2	0	9	2	+7
2	BCMMHL	Vancouver NE Chiefs	2	0	2	2	9	−7

== See also ==
- Telus Cup
