= Joe Jensen =

American ice hockey player

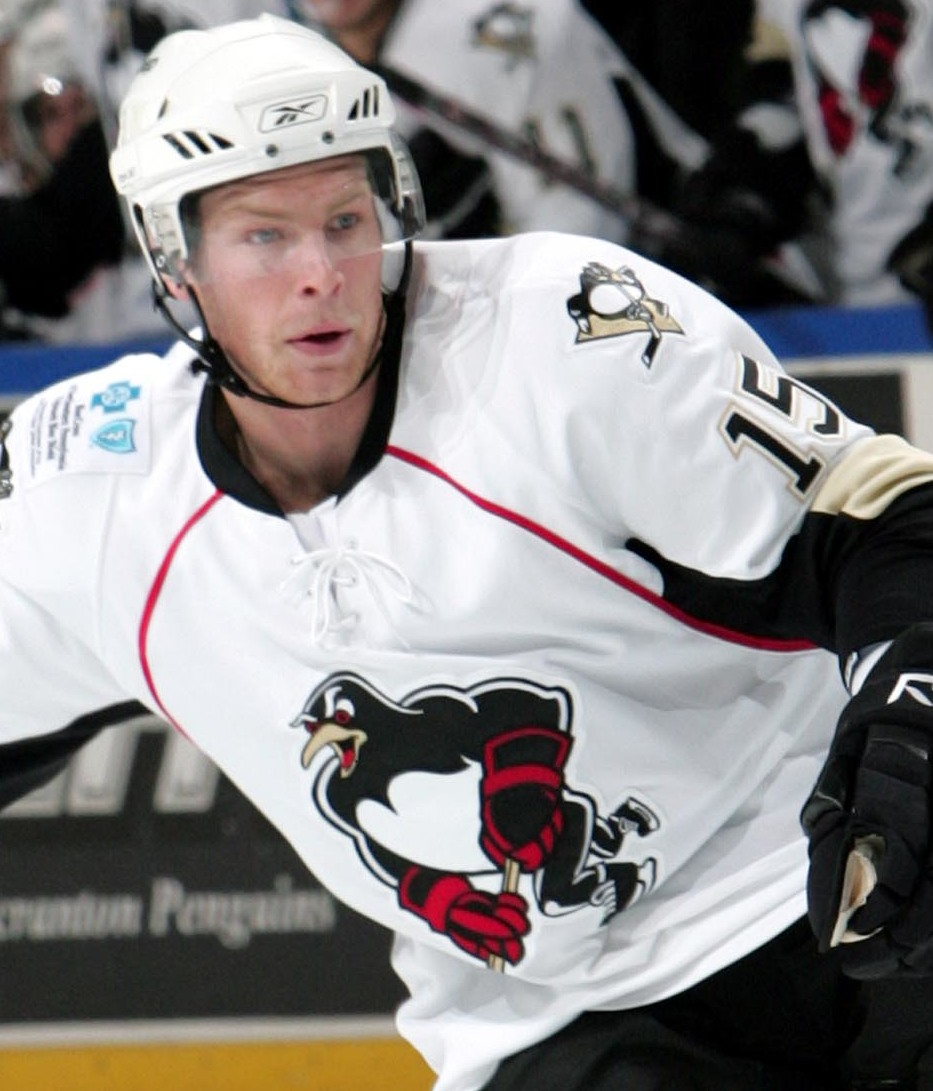
- Jensen with the Wilkes-Barre/Scranton Penguins in 2007
- Born: February 6, 1983 (age 42); Maple Grove, Minnesota, U.S.
- Height: 5 ft 11 in (180 cm)
- Weight: 180 lb (82 kg; 12 st 12 lb)
- Position: Center
- Shot: Left
- Played for: Carolina Hurricanes; HC Pustertal Wölfe; Nottingham Panthers
- NHL draft: 232nd overall, 2003; Pittsburgh Penguins
- Playing career: 2006–2014

Joseph Paul Jensen (born February 6, 1983) is an American former professional ice hockey center. He played six games with the Carolina Hurricanes of the National Hockey League.

== Playing career ==
Jensen was drafted in 2003 by the Pittsburgh Penguins while playing for St. Cloud State University of the Western Collegiate Hockey Association. He joined the professional ranks in 2006, playing 26 games with the Wilkes-Barre/Scranton Penguins, and 28 games with the Wheeling Nailers, the ECHL affiliate of the Penguins. Jensen joined the Carolina Hurricanes in a trade on January 31, 2008, in exchange for David Gove to the Pittsburgh Penguins. He scored his first National Hockey League goal in his third game with the Hurricanes on March 19, 2008 against Johan Hedberg of the Atlanta Thrashers. He played six games for the Hurricanes in 2008.

After a season off, he went to Europe and played in Italy's Serie A with HC Pustertal Wölfe where he played for three seasons.

He signed a short-term contract with the Nottingham Panthers of the Elite Ice Hockey League in October 2013. He retired part-way through the season on January 8, 2014.

== Personal life ==
He is the nephew of former NHLer David Jensen and son of Paul Jensen, who was a member of the 1976 United States Olympic ice hockey team. He is cousin with Nick Jensen.

== Career statistics ==
			Regular season					Playoffs
Season	Team	League	GP	G	A	Pts	PIM	GP	G	A	Pts	PIM
1999–2000	Osseo Senior High School	HSMN
2000–01	Sioux Falls Stampede	USHL	56	14	20	34	59	8	2	4	6	12
2001–02	Sioux Falls Stampede	USHL	57	20	26	46	135	3	0	0	0	6
2002–03	St. Cloud State University	WCHA	37	9	9	18	14	—	—	—	—	—
2003–04	St. Cloud State University	WCHA	38	10	14	24	42	—	—	—	—	—
2004–05	St. Cloud State University	WCHA	40	12	14	26	36	—	—	—	—	—
2005–06	St. Cloud State University	WCHA	38	14	18	32	14	—	—	—	—	—
2006–07	Wilkes–Barre/Scranton Penguins	AHL	26	6	5	11	16	7	2	1	3	6
2006–07	Wheeling Nailers	ECHL	28	11	18	29	45	—	—	—	—	—
2007–08	Wilkes–Barre/Scranton Penguins	AHL	27	2	2	4	23	—	—	—	—	—
2007–08	Wheeling Nailers	ECHL	9	4	3	7	28	—	—	—	—	—
2007–08	Carolina Hurricanes	NHL	6	1	0	1	2	—	—	—	—	—
2007–08	Albany River Rats	AHL	24	8	3	11	27	7	1	0	1	8
2008–09	Albany River Rats	AHL	32	6	8	14	31	—	—	—	—	—
2010–11	HC Pustertal Wölfe	Italy	39	11	22	33	59	14	6	8	14	16
2011–12	HC Pustertal Wölfe	Italy	38	27	14	41	44	12	3	5	8	22
2012–13	HC Pustertal Wölfe	Italy	43	25	33	58	79	10	6	7	13	18
2013–14	Nottingham Panthers	EIHL	16	4	11	15	50	—	—	—	—	—
AHL totals			109	22	18	40	97	14	3	1	4	14
NHL totals			6	1	0	1	2	—	—	—	—	—
Italy totals			120	63	69	132	182	36	15	20	35	56
