= John R. Hillman =

American structural engineer

- Born: April 20, 1963 (age 63); Grand Forks, North Dakota
- Education: University of Tennessee, Virginia Tech
- Known for: Invention of a hybrid composite beam
- Awards: ENR Award of Excellence
- Scientific career
- Fields: Structural engineering

John Hillman, P.E. (born April 20, 1963) is an American structural engineer who invented the hybrid composite beam (HCB) and founded the HC Bridge Company. In 2010, he was recognized with the Award of Excellence from Engineering News-Record.

== Education and career ==
Born in North Dakota and raised in east Tennessee, Hillman received a bachelor's degree from the University of Tennessee in 1986 and a master's degree in civil engineering (MSCE) from Virginia Tech in 1990. Hillman has worked at several well-known bridge companies including Figg & Muller (see Eugene Figg), Jean Muller International (see Jean M. Muller), VSL, Teng & Associates in Chicago. He is currently employed at Kiewit (see Kiewit Corporation) in Denver, Colorado.

== Development and design of the hybrid composite beam ==
At one point in his career, Hillman worked on developing fiber reinforced polymer (FRP) bridges. This led to his idea of the hybrid composite beam: combining a concrete and steel tied arch structure within an FRP box. A $320,000 grant from the Transportation Research Board's Innovations Deserving Exploratory Analysis (IDEA) program paid for the first HCB's to be constructed.(insert ENR ref tag) These beams were installed on a railroad test track (the Federal Railroad Administration's Facility for Accelerated Service Testing (FAST) loop at the Transportation Technology Center near Pueblo, Colorado). There the beams successfully supported a heavily-loaded train.

The hybrid composite beam is single structural element, a beam. It is constructed as a composite of three materials steel strands, concrete, and fiber reinforced polymer. The materials are arranged in a manner that the materials act as what would traditionally be separate structural elements. The concrete is in the shape of an arch and carries compressive load internal to the beam. The steel strands act as a tie for the arch and carry the tensile load internal to the beam. The FRP shell carries the shear and bending moment internal to the beam. This means that the beam acts structurally in a hybrid nature, somewhere between a tied-arch and a beam.

== Awards and distinctions ==
- 2010 Award of Excellence from Engineering News-Record for creating a new type of structural beam.
- Semi-finalist, 2007 Modern Marvels Invent Now Challenge from the National Inventors Hall of Fame.

== Patents ==
- US 6145270 Plasticon-optimized composite beam system
- US 7562499 Hybrid composite beam system
- US application 2009241452 Hybrid composite beam and beam system

== See also ==
- High Road Bridge - the world's first road bridge built using the hybrid composite beams
