= Jamie Mattie =

Canadian-born Austrian ice hockey player

- Born: June 28, 1980 (age 45) Antigonish, Nova Scotia, Canada
- Height: 5 ft 9 in (175 cm)
- Weight: 178 lb (81 kg; 12 st 10 lb)
- Position: Defence
- Shoots: Left
- EBEL team Former teams: Graz 99ers JYP (SM-liiga)
- National team: Austria
- Playing career: 2002–present

Jamie Mattie (born June 28, 1980, in Antigonish, Nova Scotia) is a Canadian-born Austrian ice hockey defenceman he previous played for the Graz 99ers of the Austrian Hockey League. He currently plays for the Heatherton Warriors of the Antigonish Rural Hockey league.

== Playing career ==
Mattie has played entirely in Europe since turning pro in 2002, beginning his career in Finland playing in the SM-liiga with JYP and then in Sweden playing in Division 1 with IK Pantern. In 2003 he moved to Austria playing for Graz 99ers. He has also represented his adopted country Austria in the World Hockey Championship.

== Career statistics ==
			Regular season					Playoffs
Season	Team	League	GP	G	A	Pts	PIM	GP	G	A	Pts	PIM
1998-99	Cape Breton Screaming Eagles	QMJHL	12	0	0	0	4	--	--	--	--	--
2000-01	Sioux Falls Stampede	USHL	49	12	53	65	53	8	0	4	4	18
2002-03	JYP	FNL	2	0	0	0	0	--	--	--	--	--
2003-04	Graz 99ers	EBEL	51	5	22	27	42	--	--	--	--	--
2004-05	Graz 99ers	EBEL	22	1	7	8	18	--	--	--	--	--
2005-06	Graz 99ers	EBEL	18	0	1	1	8	--	--	--	--	--
2006-07	Graz 99ers	EBEL	34	0	9	9	75	--	--	--	--	--
2008-09	Graz 99ers	EBEL	50	1	2	3	40	--	--	--	--	--

== International play ==
Played for Austria in:

- 2007- World Championships

=== International statistics ===
Year	Team	Comp	GP	G	A	Pts	PIM
2007	Austria	WC	6	0	0	0	0
