= Cole Sillinger =

Canadian hockey player (born 2003)

- Born: May 16, 2003 (age 23) Columbus, Ohio, U.S.
- Height: 6 ft 2 in (188 cm)
- Weight: 201 lb (91 kg; 14 st 5 lb)
- Position: Centre
- Shoots: Left
- NHL team: Columbus Blue Jackets
- National team: Canada
- NHL draft: 12th overall, 2021; Columbus Blue Jackets
- Playing career: 2021–present

Cole Sillinger (born May 16, 2003) is an American-born Canadian professional ice hockey player who is a centre and alternate captain for the Columbus Blue Jackets of the National Hockey League (NHL). Sillinger was selected by the Blue Jackets 12th overall in the 2021 NHL entry draft.

== Playing career ==
Sillinger was selected 11th overall by the Medicine Hat Tigers of the Western Hockey League in the 2018 WHL Bantam Draft. He debuted and appeared in 4 games with the Tigers in 2018–19, tallying two assists. Sillinger was fourth among points for the Tigers in 2019–20, scoring 22 goals and 53 points in 48 appearances with the team.

In 2020, due to the COVID-19 pandemic delaying the return of the Western Hockey League, the Tigers agreed to send Sillinger to the Sioux Falls Stampede in the United States Hockey League on a one-year loan agreement. During the 2020–21 season, Sillinger led the Stampede in points, garnering 24 goals and 46 points in 31 games played. He earned 2021 USHL Rookie of the Year honors by a unanimous vote of league general managers for his performance and was elected to the first all-USHL rookie team and all-USHL third team.

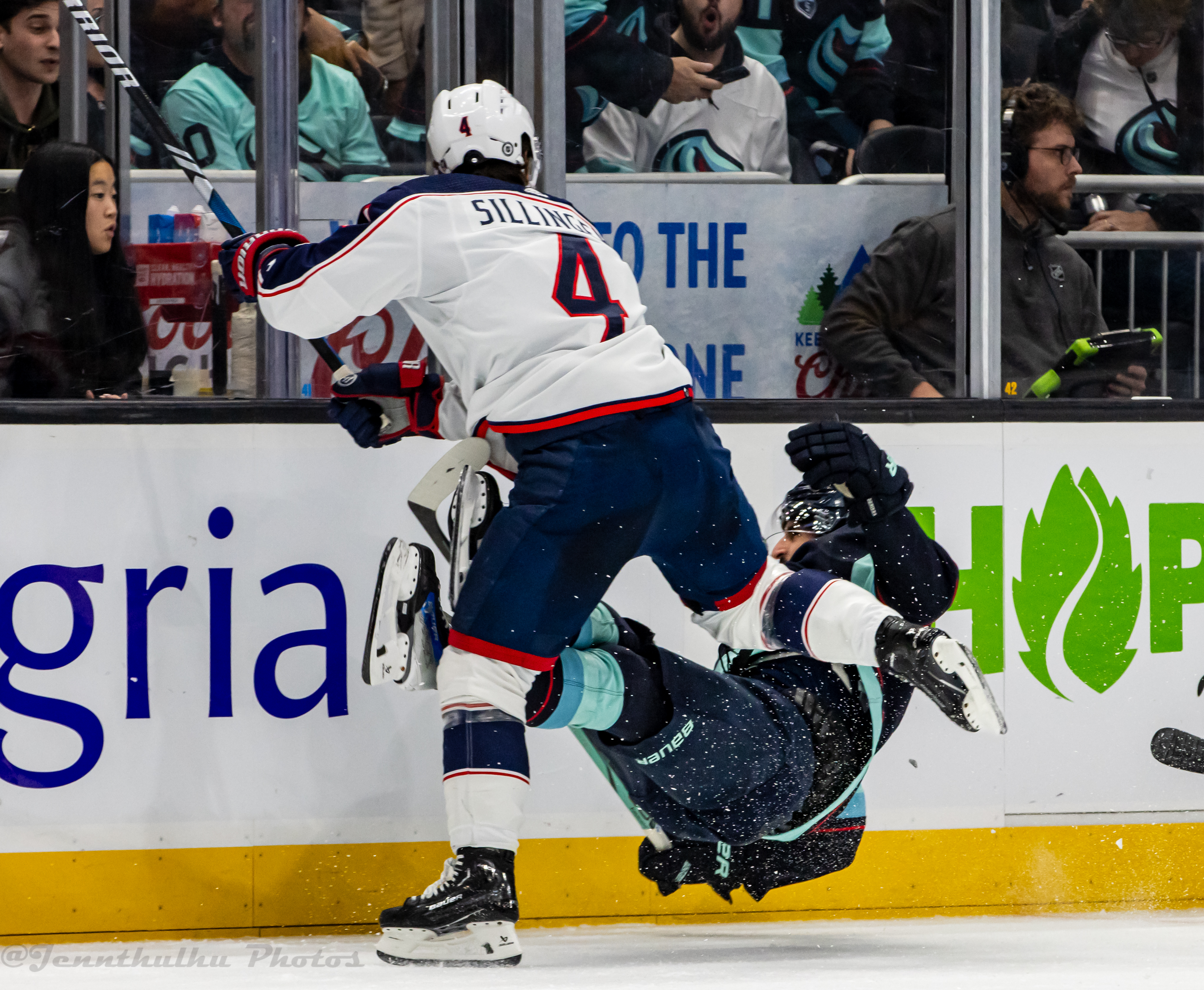
Sillinger checking Matty Beniers of the Seattle Kraken in 2024.

The NHL Central Scouting Bureau ranked Sillinger as the 10th-best North American skater eligible ahead of the 2021 NHL entry draft. On July 23, 2021, Sillinger was selected 12th overall by the Blue Jackets in the 2021 draft.

On March 13, 2022, Sillinger scored his first NHL career hat-trick in a 6–4 win against the Vegas Golden Knights.

On August 21, 2024, the Blue Jackets re-signed Sillinger to a two-year, $4.5 million contract extension with an annual average of $2.25 million.

== Personal life ==
Cole Sillinger was born in Columbus, Ohio on May 16, 2003, the third son of Karla (née Dreger) Sillinger and former National Hockey League forward Mike Sillinger. Mike also played for the Blue Jackets at the time of his son's birth. The family briefly resided in Phoenix, Arizona, St. Louis, Missouri and Garden City, New York, as Mike's career led him on to play for the Phoenix Coyotes, St. Louis Blues, and New York Islanders, respectively. Sillinger grew up in Regina, Saskatchewan and represents Hockey Canada. He has two older brothers that play hockey, Owen is a member of Columbus affiliate Cleveland Monsters in the American Hockey League and Lukas skates with Arizona State University.

== Career statistics ==
=== Regular season and playoffs ===
			Regular season					Playoffs
Season	Team	League	GP	G	A	Pts	PIM	GP	G	A	Pts	PIM
2018–19	Regina Pat Canadians	SMAAAHL	39	31	45	76	44	8	4	7	11	24
2018–19	Medicine Hat Tigers	WHL	4	0	2	2	0	6	1	0	1	0
2019–20	Medicine Hat Tigers	WHL	48	22	31	53	22	—	—	—	—	—
2020–21	Sioux Falls Stampede	USHL	31	24	22	46	39	—	—	—	—	—
2021–22	Columbus Blue Jackets	NHL	79	16	15	31	37	—	—	—	—	—
2022–23	Columbus Blue Jackets	NHL	64	3	8	11	22	—	—	—	—	—
2022–23	Cleveland Monsters	AHL	11	2	4	6	12	—	—	—	—	—
2023–24	Columbus Blue Jackets	NHL	77	13	19	32	46	—	—	—	—	—
2024–25	Columbus Blue Jackets	NHL	66	11	22	33	35	—	—	—	—	—
2025–26	Columbus Blue Jackets	NHL	81	8	25	33	37	—	—	—	—	—
NHL totals			367	51	89	140	177	—	—	—	—	—

Medal record

Representing Canada

Ice hockey

World Championships
Silver medal – second place	2022 Finland	

=== International ===
Year	Team	Event	Result	GP	G	A	Pts	PIM
2019	Canada White	U17	4th	6	5	0	5	2
2022	Canada	WC	2nd place, silver medalist(s)	10	3	0	3	8
Junior totals				6	5	0	5	2
Senior totals				10	3	0	3	8

Awards and achievements
Preceded by Kent Johnson	Columbus Blue Jackets first-round draft pick 2021	Succeeded by Corson Ceulemans
