= Sioux Falls Stampede =

Junior ice hockey team based in Sioux Falls, South Dakota

- City: Sioux Falls, South Dakota
- League: United States Hockey League
- Conference: Western
- Founded: 1999
- Home arena: Denny Sanford Premier Center
- Colors: Dark blue, gold, black, white
- Owners: Stampede Hockey, LLC
- General manager: Tony Gasparini
- Head coach: Ryan Cruthers
- Media: KELO (AM); Argus Leader; KDLT-TV; KELO-TV; KSFY-TV
- Website: www.sfstampede.com

Franchise history
- 1999–present: Sioux Falls Stampede

Championships
- Regular season titles: 1 Anderson Cup (2005–06)
- Division titles: 1 (2005–06)
- Conference titles: 3 (2015, 2019, 2026)
- Playoff championships: 4 Clark Cups (2007, 2015 2019, 2026)

The Sioux Falls Stampede are a junior ice hockey team based in Sioux Falls, South Dakota. The Stampede are members of the Western Conference of the United States Hockey League (USHL). The team plays home games at the Denny Sanford Premier Center, the largest facility in capacity and size in the USHL. The team was established in 1999.

The team holds four Clark Cup championships, winning most recently in the 2025–26 season, three conference and one division championships, and was awarded the Anderson Cup in the 2005–06 season for the league's highest win percentage. The organization holds the USHL single-season attendance record at 200,597 fans over the 2015–16 season and are a six-time USHL organization of the year recipient. Forty-four former players have skated in the National Hockey League (NHL).

== History ==
=== Foundation ===
Discussions began as early as 1994 to bring a United States Hockey League (USHL) expansion to the city of Sioux Falls. Expansion talks failed on three separate occasions, including a bid by Wisconsin Capitols owner Geoffrey Kelly to relocate to Sioux Falls, due to the city's failure to provide a permanent home and publicly-backed funds. The Minnehaha Ice and Recreation Center and Expo Ice Arena at the W.H. Lyon Fairgrounds were in contention to host the team, however, both lacked sufficient locker rooms or accommodations for fans to meet league demands. The Sioux Falls Arena was also presented as an option, but was written off due to poor sight lines and potential scheduling conflicts with other tenants.

In 1998, the Minnesota-based investment firm Central Ventures, Inc., led by Brian Schoenborn, expressed interest in adding a USHL team to the Sioux Falls sports landscape. The firm and local investment group Sioux Falls Sports, LLC. made an official proposal on January 26, 1998, to the league at its annual board of governors meeting held in Lincoln, Nebraska. Unlike other proposals, the investment firm was willing to help privately fund improvements at an existing facility or the construction of a new arena with help from the city.

On May 26, 1998, league president Gino Gasparini awarded Sioux Falls a franchise to begin play in September 1999. The city finalized a deal that would upgrade the existing Sioux Falls Arena for an estimated $1 million funded between the city and team. In choosing the team name, the ownership group set up a telephone line fans called to make suggestions. On September 30, 1998, after more than 140 name submissions were filed, the official name Stampede and American bison logo were unveiled to represent the new Sioux Falls franchise.

=== First seasons and early struggles: 1999–2005 ===
On October 7, 1998, former Miami University of Ohio associate coach Bob Motzko was named the inaugural head coach. Motzko had previously led the defunct North Iowa Huskies to the 1989 Junior A Championship and was an assistant to Herb Brooks at St. Cloud State University during the 1986–87 season. For Motzko, the plan was to "win as fast as possible" and recruit high-caliber players: "You do not win in this league without veterans and our first year we might not have many veterans. But I want to get at it right away." Motzko would recruit several key players that played an instrumental role in the success that was to come, including forwards J.B. Bittner, Dave Iannazzo, Chad LaRose, Thomas Vanek, James Massen, Marty Sertich and Joe Jensen; defenseman Jamie Mattie; and goaltenders Zack Sikich and David Bowen.

The Stampede were placed in the Western Division and played their inaugural game at home against the Cedar Rapids RoughRiders on September 24, 1999, to a sold-out crowd of 4,660 fans, including an estimated 2,000 season ticket holders. The team completed its inaugural season 37–17–4, the highest for a first-year expansion, and qualified for a Clark Cup playoff match-up against the Twin Cities Vulcans. The team was led by forward Rick Gorman, who finished the season scoring 68 points, 25 goals and 43 assists. Motzko was named general manager of the year and Gorman was named to the all-USHL first team. The following season the team found similar success as it qualified for back-to-back playoff appearances with a 40–14–2 record. The Stampede beat the RoughRiders in the first round before losing to eventual Clark Cup champions, the Omaha Lancers. Following the season, coach Motzko left the Stampede to pursue an assistant coach role at the University of Minnesota.

The team's ownership elected to hire Stampede assistant coach Tony Gasparini, the son of now former USHL president Gino Gasparini, to fill the head coach role. Gasparini's team finished the 2001–02 season 35–21–5, earning the team's third playoff appearance in as many years against the Sioux City Musketeers. However, the organization was once again knocked out in the early rounds. In the same season, star forward Thomas Vanek set a league-leading, team record of 91 points in a season, with 46 goals and 45 assists in his final year with the team. The city of Sioux Falls hosted the 20th USHL Prospects All-Star Game, attended by National Hockey League (NHL) scouts, while the organization was awarded its first USHL Organization of the Year award.

The Stampede accumulated a 112–52–11 overall record in its first three years of operation; however, the team's top four scoring players from the previous season, including Vanek, would not return for the 2002–03 season. After 52 games, Coach Gasparini's 21–25–6 team was in the midst of a six-game losing streak and ranked last in goals allowed per game. The poor performance prompted the ownership group to relieve Gasparini from his coaching duties and appoint assistant coach Ted Belisle as interim head coach in an attempt to salvage the team's playoff chances. The team finished its remaining eight games 3–5–0. The Stampede failed to make the playoffs for the first time in franchise history with a 24–30–6 record while also accruing a total of 1404 penalty minutes, the most of any team that season. Belisle was not retained as head coach.

On April 21, 2003, the Stampede announced the hiring of former San Jose Sharks assistant coach Mark Kaufman as head coach for the 2003–04 season with the intent of making a more disciplined defensive team. However, the team suffered its worst season record to date, going 15–42–3. The following 2004–05 season allowed a franchise-high 252 goals over 60 games and the team failed to make the playoffs for the third consecutive season. The Stampede fired Kaufman on April 6, 2005, after posting a 42–70–8 record over two seasons.

=== Finding success and first Clark Cup championship: 2005–2012 ===
In an attempt to reinvigorate the franchise, Sioux Falls hired former University of Minnesota player and St. Paul Vulcans head coach Kevin Hartzell for the 2005–06 season. Hartzell previously led the Vulcans to three Clark Cup final appearances, including a championship during the 1983–84 season, and posted a 195–83–8 record overall between 1983 and 1989.

In his first year with the team, Hartzell led the club to a 43–13–4 record, its only Anderson Cup title, awarded to the team with the league's highest regular-season win percentage, and first division championship. The team was led by future NHL players Andreas Nödl, Nate Prosser and Ryan Thang; and the goaltender tandem of John Murray and Alex Kangas. The Stampede defense finished first overall in the USHL and set a franchise record for fewest goals allowed in a season with 135. Seven players were selected for the 2006 USHL All-Star/Prospects game in Sioux City, Iowa, and the team swept the Tri-City Storm and defeated the Lincoln Stars before advancing to their first Clark Cup championship appearance. The club was defeated by the Des Moines Buccaneers in a best-of-five series, 3–2. The team ended the 2005–06 season with a franchise best 21–7–2 home record and 22–6–2 away record, including a franchise-high win streak of 16 games.

Expectations were high for Hartzell's sophomore year, but the team found itself near the bottom of the standings much of the first half of the season after starting the previous season 27–3–0. The team built momentum by going 16–5–1 in the months of January and February and managed to enter the 2006–07 playoffs as the fourth and final seed in the West Division. The Stampede swept the Lincoln Stars in four games in the first round, but lost to the Des Moines Buccaneers in the first game of a two-game, second-round round robin. The Stampede defeated the Tri-City Storm in overtime in their second game and advanced to the final four, single-elimination tournament. The team defeated the top seeded Indiana Ice, who were undefeated up to that point in the playoffs, 3–2 in overtime in the semi-final round. In their second Clark Cup Final appearance in as many years, the Stampede shutout the Black Hawks 3–0 to win their first Clark Cup championship. Goaltender Matt Lundin was named the Clark Cup Final most valuable player. Future NHL player Corey Tropp led the team in scoring with 26 goals, 32 assists for 58 points, including a team-leading 13 points, four goals and nine assists in the playoffs.

Returning for Hartzell's third season were veteran forwards Nick Dineen, David Grun, Jake Hansen, Robbie Vrolyk and newcomer Jack Connolly, the seventh overall pick of the 2007 USHL Entry Draft. Finding similar success in previous seasons, Hartzell employed another goaltender tandem composed of his son, Eric Hartzell, and veteran Max Strang. The team finished the season 35–19–6, earning a third consecutive playoff berth, while Hartzell set a franchise-high five shutouts in the regular season. After sweeping the Lincoln Stars in the first round the previous season, the Stars returned the favor and shutout Sioux Falls 3–0. First-year forward Connolly led the league in scoring, finishing with 26 goals and 46 assists for 72 points. Connolly was named the 2007–08 season USHL Rookie of the Year and USA Hockey Player of the Year.

During the 2008–09 season, the Stampede finished 28–28–4, qualified for the playoffs and was again defeated by the Lincoln Stars. The club was led by forwards Terry Broadhurst and David Eddy. The following season was matched with similar success as the team finished 33–25–12, but, for the third consecutive season, was knocked out of the playoffs in the first round. The club had one of the most potent offenses in team history, ranking fourth in goals for with 223. The offensive output was led by forwards Michael Voran and Matt Lindblad and defenseman Chad Ruhwedel. Goaltender Clay Witt recorded six regular season shutouts, breaking the record previously held by Hartzell two seasons prior.

The team's previous failure to move beyond the first round became a point of consternation among fans. After finishing the 2010–11 season 34–20–6, the Stampede defeated rival Sioux City Musketeers 2–1 and Omaha Lancers 3–0 and advanced to face the Dubuque Fighting Saints in the Western Conference Championship. The club found success in a balanced attack with no true standouts, as eight different players tallied 30 points or more. The Fighting Saints bested Sioux Falls 3–1 in a best-of-five series. The playoff run would be the last of Hartzell's career as the team finished the 2011–12 season 17–36–7, the second worst record in team history.

On May 1, 2012, the Sioux Falls Stampede ownership group of Sioux Falls Sports, LLC. sold a majority stake in the team to SD Sports and Entertainment. The new ownership group subsequently fired Hartzell six days later. He is the winningest coach in team history with a 224–152–44 record over seven seasons.

=== Second and third Clark Cup championships: 2012–2021 ===
On May 11, 2012, five days after firing coach Hartzell, the new ownership group hired former University of North Dakota assistant coach Cary Eades. Eades previously spent 15 years over two stints with the program, earning four NCAA Frozen Four appearances and a national championship in 1987. He also spent two seasons as the head coach of the now defunct Dubuque Fighting Saints (1980–2001), going 86–46–7 and winning a National Tournament Championship in 1992. In his first season as head coach in 2012–13, Eades led the club to its best regular season performance finishing 45–17–2, six points shy of a second Anderson Cup title.

The 2014–15 season was highly anticipated by the city of Sioux Falls, as the Stampede debuted their new home, the recently constructed Denny Sanford Premier Center. On October 11, 2014, three weeks into the season, the club hosted the Waterloo Black Hawks to a sold-out crowd of 10,678 for their first game in the facility, recorded as the largest indoor sporting event in South Dakota history. The team started the season inconsistent, failing to string together wins and approached the halfway point of the season towards the bottom of the standings with an 11–12–3 record. Following the holiday break, the Stampede put together several winning streaks, finished a promising 32–23–5 and managed to clinch the fourth and final playoff spot. The Stampede faced and defeated the regular season Western Conference leading Sioux City Musketeers in a best-of-five series, 3–2. In the second round, after losing the first game, the Stampede put together three consecutive victories, including a shutout by goaltender Stefanos Lekkas, to earn their first conference championship against the second seeded Tri-City Storm. In their third Clark Cup final appearance, the Stampede completed a 3–0 sweep of the Muskegon Lumberjacks on home ice to earn their second Clark Cup championship. Forward Troy Loggins was named the Clark Cup playoffs most valuable player, tallying 16 points in 12 games played. Rookie forward Kieffer Bellows led the team in scoring with 33 goals and 19 assists for 52 points in 58 games, a Tier I junior rookie record for a 16-year-old, including three hat-tricks. The performance earned him USHL Rookie of the Year honors and a spot on the USHL All-third Team and All-rookie Team.

Less than a week after winning a Clark Cup championship, head coach Eades departed the club citing contract extension issues to take the vacant head coach position with the Fargo Force.

On May 21, 2015, the Stampede hired former Colorado College head coach Scott Owens. Owens previously spent 15 seasons with the program for a combined 324-228-62 regular-season record. Prior to his time with the Tigers, he spent four seasons with the Des Moines Buccaneers between 1995 and 1999 and the Madison Capitols between 1986 and 1990, earning a USHL playoff appearance in each season, two Anderson Cup championships, and a Clark Cup championship in 1999.

On May 17, 2019, the Stampede defeated the Chicago Steel in a three-game sweep for its third Clark Cup championship in team history. The team finished the 2019 Clark Cup playoffs with an 11–1 record.

Head coach Scott Owens announced his retirement from coaching on March 26, 2020, after spending five seasons with the club. The ownership group filled the roles left by Owens with former Minot Minotauros general manager and head coach Marty Murray on April 28, 2020. Murray led the North American Hockey League (NAHL) club to a combined 254–194–44 record over eight seasons, including a division championship in 2016–17 and a 2018 Robertson Cup runner-up finish. He was named NAHL General Manager of the Year after the 2018–19 campaign.

In his first season with the team, Murray finished with an 18–32–4 record and failed to qualify for the Clark Cup playoffs for the sixth time in club history. At the league trade deadline, on February 22, 2021, the Stampede were 15–15–3 and four points out of second place in the Western Conference. The Herd lost several key players to long-term injuries, including top-scoring defenseman Brent Johnson, and would finish 3–17–1 in the final 21 games. Rookie forward Cole Sillinger led the team in scoring with 24 goals and 22 assists for 46 points in 31 games played. Sillinger was acquired on one-year loan from the Medicine Hat Tigers due to coronavirus pandemic restrictions in Canada.

== Team information ==
=== Logos and uniforms ===
The official primary colors of the Sioux Falls Stampede are navy and gold with the secondary colors black and white. The primary logo is a navy circle with a gold trim with a white and black bison silhouette at the forefront. Above the oval is the word mark "SIOUX FALLS" and below "STAMPEDE." The secondary logo is a blue bison charging through a cloud of smoke with the left hoof in the forefront. Above the bison is the word mark "SIOUX FALLS" and below "STAMPEDE." From team inception to sometime prior to the 2005–06 season, the current secondary logo served as the primary logo and vice versa. Both logos were created by Paulsen Marketing in Sioux Falls.

=== Mascot ===
On September 10, 1999, the Stampede placed an ad in the Argus Leader asking fans to assist in naming the new team's mascot. On September 21, the team unveiled the official mascot as a blue American bison called Stomp at a community gathering. Jolee Thurn is credited with naming the buffalo. Stomp wears a team jersey, black hockey helmet, navy hockey pants, ice skates while skating and black shoes. The mascot received an updated physical look prior to the 2014–15 season.

=== Fighting Wiener Dogs ===
Since the 2019–20 season, the team has rebranded to the Sioux Falls Fighting Wiener Dogs for its annual, one-game dachshund racing charity event. The event consists of three heats with 40 dachshunds racing on the ice during the game's intermissions. The rebranding has gained global recognition, including social media features on the NHL Network, ESPN, TSN Hockey and by the New York Yankees. The first event took place in 2007 and consisted of 10 dogs.

== Broadcasting ==
Radio coverage is provided by flagship station KELO (AM 1320). The Stampede radio broadcast team is led by Jim Olander and in-studio host Ray Crockett. The radio network broadcasts pregame coverage, games with commentary, guest appearances by coachers and players, and postgame wrap-ups.

== Season-by-season record ==
United States Hockey League

Season	GP	W	L	OTL	SOL	PTS	GF	GA	PIM	Finish	Playoffs
1999–00	58	37	17	—	4	78	239	179	963	2nd of 7, West	Lost Quarterfinals, 0–3 vs. Twin Cities Vulcans
2000–01	56	40	14	2	—	82	267	182	1023	2nd of 6, West	Won Quarterfinals, 3–1 vs. Cedar Rapids RoughRiders; Lost Semifinals, 1–3 vs. Omaha Lancers
2001–02	61	35	21	5	—	75	252	217	1372	4th of 7, West	Lost Quarterfinals, 0–3 vs. Sioux City Musketeers
2002–03	60	24	30	2	4	54	179	223	1404	6th of 6, West	did not qualify
2003–04	60	15	42	1	2	33	148	252	1250	6th of 6, West	did not qualify
2004–05	60	27	28	2	3	59	178	200	1154	5th of 5, West	did not qualify
2005–06	60	43	13	1	3	90	190	135	1165	1st of 5, West; 1st of 11, USHL	Won Quarterfinals, 3–2 vs. Tri-City Storm; Won Semifinals, 3–1 vs. Lincoln Stars; Lost Clark Cup Finals, 2–3 vs. Des Moines Buccaneers
2006–07	60	34	21	3	2	73	195	174	1215	4th of 6, West; 6th of 12, USHL	Won Opening Round, 4–0 vs. Lincoln Stars; 1–1–0 in Divisional Round Robin (L, 2–3 vs. Buccaneers; OTW, 4–3 vs. Storm); Won Semifinal game, 3–2 vs. Indiana Ice; Won Clark Cup Championship game, 3–0 vs. Waterloo Black Hawks
2007–08	60	35	19	2	4	76	199	175	967	2nd of 6, West; 4th of 12, USHL	Lost Quarterfinals, 0–3 vs. Lincoln Stars
2008–09	60	28	28	1	3	60	182	199	956	4th of 6, West; 9th of 12, USHL	Lost Quarterfinals, 1–3 vs. Lincoln Stars
2009–10	60	33	15	4	8	78	223	182	932	3rd of 7, West; 5th of 14, USHL	Lost Quarterfinals, 0–3 vs. Fargo Force
2010–11	60	34	20	1	5	74	197	168	905	3rd of 8, West; 6th of 16, USHL	Won Conf. Quarterfinals, 2–1 vs. Sioux City Musketeers; Won Conf. Semifinals, 3–0 vs. Omaha Lancers; Lost Conf. Finals, 1–3 vs. Dubuque Fighting Saints
2011–12	60	17	36	1	6	41	127	215	1045	8th of 8, West; 16th of 16, USHL	did not qualify
2012–13	64	45	17	1	1	92	241	187	1047	1st of 8, West; 2nd of 16, USHL	Won Conf. Semifinals, 3–2 vs. Lincoln Stars; Lost Conf. Finals, 2–3 vs. Fargo Force
2013–14	60	34	19	3	4	79	202	157	1132	3rd of 8, West; 4th of 16, USHL	Lost Conf. Semifinals, 0–3 vs. Waterloo Black Hawks
2014–15	60	32	23	1	4	69	191	181	1110	4th of 8, West; 8th of 17, USHL	Won Conf. Semifinals, 3–2 vs. Sioux City Musketeers; Won Conf. Finals, 3–1 vs. Tri-City Storm; Won Clark Cup Finals, 3–0 vs. Muskegon Lumberjacks
2015–16	60	31	25	3	1	66	164	174	908	4th of 8, West; 9th of 17, USHL	Lost Conf. Semifinals, 0–3 vs. Tri-City Storm
2016–17	60	21	30	3	6	51	169	193	902	7th of 8, West; 14th of 17, USHL	did not qualify
2017–18	60	32	19	4	5	73	187	181	1018	4th of 8, West; 5th of 17, USHL	Lost First Round, 1–2 vs. Lincoln Stars
2018–19	62	39	16	5	2	85	234	190	917	3rd of 8, West; 4th of 17, USHL	Won First Round, 2–0 vs. Sioux City Musketeers; Won Conf. Semifinals, 3–1 vs. Waterloo Black Hawks; Won Conf. Finals, 3–0 vs. Tri-City Storm; Won Clark Cup Finals, 3–0 vs. Chicago Steel
2019–20	47	21	19	5	2	49	134	154	589	6th of 8, West; 10th of 16, USHL	Season cancelled due to coronavirus pandemic
2020–21	54	18	32	3	1	40	163	213	911	8th of 8, West; 13th of 14, USHL	did not qualify
2021–22	62	19	37	3	3	44	152	237	843	7th of 8, West; 15th of 16, USHL	did not qualify
2022–23	62	23	31	5	3	54	181	225	809	7th of 8, West; 14th of 16, USHL	did not qualify
2023–24	62	28	28	5	1	62	219	250	703	5th of 8, West; 10th of 16, USHL	Lost First Round, 1–2 vs. Tri-City Storm
2024–25	62	40	17	3	2	85	272	166	891	2nd of 8, West; 4th of 16, USHL	Lost Second Round, 1-3 vs. Waterloo Blackhawks
2025–26	62	43	14	3	2	89	267	147	899	2nd of 8, West; 2nd of 16, USHL	Won Conf. Semifinals, 2–1 vs. Lincoln Stars; Won Conf. Finals, 3–2 vs. Fargo Force; Won Clark Cup Finals, 3–1 vs. Muskegon Lumberjacks

== Players ==
=== Team captains ===
- Jared Hanowski, 1999–00
- J.B. Bittner, 2000–01
- Joe Jensen, Thomas Vanek (co-captains), 2001–02
- Jason Moul, 2002–03
- Jim McKenzie, 2003–04
- Andrew Carroll, 2004–05
- Ben Holmstrom, Nate Prosser (co-captains), 2005–06
- Zach Redmond, Patrick Tiesling (co-captains), 2006–07
- Nick Dineen, Jacob Drewiske (co-captains), 2007–08
- Max Grover, 2008–09
- Chad Ruhwedel, 2009–10
- Sam Coatta, Marcus Perrier (co-captains), 2010–11
- Joseph Lordo, 2011–12
- Ryan Siiro, 2012–13
- Ed McGovern, 2013–14
- Logan O'Connor, Ryan Schwalbe (co-captains), 2014–15
- Parker Tuomie, 2015–16
- Josh Passolt, 2016–17
- Paul DeNaples, 2017–18
- Marko Reifenberger, 2018–19
- Blake Bride, 2018–19
- Ryan Sullivan, 2019–20
- Will Dineen, 2020–21
- Cole Miller, 2022–23
- Jack Phelan, 2023–24
- Brock James, Bryce Ingles, Austin Baker (co-captains), 2024-25
- Logan Renkowski, J.J. Monteiro, Joe McGraw (co-captains), 2025-26

=== National Hockey League alumni ===
- Conor Allen
- Kieffer Bellows
- Lean Bergmann
- Stu Bickel
- Max Crozier
- Karsen Dorwart
- Mikey Eyssimont
- Joe Finley
- Alex Foster
- Alex Goligoski
- Ben Holmstrom
- Joe Jensen
- Ryan Johnson
- Dakota Joshua
- Matt Kessel
- Yan Kuznetsov
- Chad LaRose
- Andre Lee
- Matt Lindblad
- Charlie Lindgren
- Brad Malone
- Victor Mancini
- Cooper Marody
- Zach Metsa
- Griffen Molino
- Andreas Nödl
- Logan O'Connor
- Jordan Oesterle
- Jamie Oleksiak
- T. J. Oshie
- Nate Prosser
- Kyle Rau
- Zach Redmond
- Chad Ruhwedel
- Arsenii Sergeev
- Dan Sexton
- Cole Sillinger
- Jaxson Stauber
- C. J. Suess
- Jeremy Swayman
- Ryan Thang
- Corey Tropp
- Thomas Vanek
- Joe Vitale

=== Franchise career leaders ===
These are the top franchise leaders in regular season points, goals, assists, points per game, games played, and goaltending wins as of the end of the 2020–21 season.

Points
Player	Pos	GP	G	A	Pts	P/G
Thomas Vanek	F	108	80	73	153	1.42
Mike Doyle	F	113	55	79	134	1.19
Dave Iannazzo	F	112	49	72	121	1.08
Jacob Micflikier	F	120	55	56	111	0.93
C.J. Suess	F	116	54	57	111	0.97
Nick Dineen	F	171	46	63	109	0.64
Dennis Kravchenko	F	101	35	77	109	1.08
James Massen	F	109	53	55	108	0.99
Jason Moul	RW	121	40	66	106	0.88
Zeb Knutson	RW	116	53	46	99	0.85

Goals
Player	Pos	G
Thomas Vanek	RW	80
Mike Doyle	LW	55
Jacob Micflikier	LW	55
C.J. Suess	LW	54
James Massen	RW	53
Zeb Knutson	RW	53
Tony Calderone	RW	53
Dave Iannazzo	F	49
Parker Tuomie	RW	49
Robbie Vrolyk	F	47

Assists
Player	Pos	A
Mike Doyle	LW	79
Dennis Kravchenko	C	74
Thomas Vanek	RW	73
Dave Iannazzo	F	72
Jason Moul	RW	66
Nick Dineen	C	63
C.J. Suess	LW	57
Jacob Micflikier	LW	56
Jim McKenzie	F	56
James Massen	RW	55

Points per game
Player	Pos	P/G
Cole Sillinger	F	1.48
Thomas Vanek	RW	1.42
Jamie Mattie	D	1.33
Cooper Marody	C	1.29
Jack Connolly	C	1.24
Rick Gorman	LW	1.24
Michael Voran	F	1.23
Matt Lindblad	LW	1.23
Mike Doyle	LW	1.19
Eric Przepiorka	C	1.18

Games played
Player	Pos	GP
Ed McGovern	D	183
Nick Dineen	F	171
Matthew Grimes	D	167
Robbie Vrolyk	F	161
Marcus Perrier	D	160
Aleksandr Rybakov	D	157
Jacob Drewiske	F	156
Nate Prosser	D	150
Clint Levens	F	150
Jeff Corey	F	149

Goaltenders
Player	Seasons	GP	TOI	W	L	OT	GA	GAA	SA	SV%	SO
Kellen Briggs	2000–2003	112	6,116	57	45	5	359	3.52	3,353	.902	4
Stefanos Lekkas	2013–2016	88	4,995	46	29	4	218	2.62	2,583	.916	6
Charlie Lindgren	2011–2013	85	4,674	43	33	5	234	3.00	2,413	.903	2
Jaxson Stauber	2017–2020	75	4,033	38	20	9	188	2.80	1,904	.901	2
Mikhail Berdin	2016–2018	76	4,312	38	25	9	193	2.69	2,489	.922	3
Eric Hartzell	2006–2009	79	4,495	35	32	2	231	3.08	2,419	.905	6
Linards Feldbergs	2025–2026	49	4,312	35	12	2	123	2.51	2,942	.910	2
Clay Witt	2008–2010	62	3,595	31	18	9	165	2.75	1,791	.908	7
David Bowen	1999–2000	51	2,908	31	15	3	144	2.97	1,367	.905	1
John Murray	2004–2006	59	3,047	26	20	3	133	2.62	1,598	.917	4
Stephon Williams	2010–2012	56	3,155	26	16	8	138	2.62	1,538	.910	2

== Awards ==
Hobey Baker Award

- Marty Sertich, Colorado College, 2005
- Jack Connolly, Minnesota Duluth, 2012

Mike Richter Award

- Jeremy Swayman, Maine, 2020

USHL Rookie of the Year

- Matt Ford, 2003–04
- Jack Connolly, 2007–08
- Kieffer Bellows, 2014–15
- Cole Sillinger, 2020–21
- Cooper Soller, 2025–26

USHL Defenseman of the Year

- Jamie Mattie, 2000–01

Curt Hammer Award (Best reflects USHL goals, team and organization)

- Zach Redmond, 2006–07
- Ryan Siiro, 2012–13
- Will Dineen, 2020–21

Dave Tyler Junior Player of the Year Award (USA Hockey Top Junior Player)

- Jack Connolly, 2007–08

All-USHL First Team

- Rick Gorman, 1999–2000
- Thomas Vanek, Jamie Mattie, James Massen, 2000–01
- Mike Vannelli, 2002–03
- Matt Ford, 2003–04
- Andreas Nödl, 2005–06
- Jack Connolly, 2007–08

All-USHL Second Team

- Jared Hanowski, 1999–2000
- Mike Doyle, 2000–01
- Eric Przepiorka, 2001–02
- John Murray, Nate Prosser, 2005–06
- Jake Hansen, 2007–08
- Jaxson Stauber, 2019–20
- Cole Sillinger, Brent Johnson, 2020–21
- Logan Renkowski, 2025–26

All-USHL Third Team

- Kieffer Bellows, 2014–15
- Jack St. Ivany, 2017–18
- Max Crozier, 2018–19
- Sam Stange, 2019–20
- Brent Solomon, 2025–26

USHL All-Rookie First Team

- Alex Kangas, 2005–06
- Jack Connolly, 2007–08
- David Eddy, 2008–09
- Tony Calderone, 2012–13
- Kieffer Bellows, 2014–15
- Ryan Johnson, 2018–19
- Evan Nause, 2019–20
- Cole Sillinger, Brent Johnson, 2020–21
- Cooper Soller, Jake Prunty, 2025–26

USHL All-Rookie Second Team

- Anthony Romano, 2018–19
- John McNelis, 2023–24
- Ethan Wyttenbach, Anthony Bongo, 2024–25

USHL Coach of the Year

- Kevin Hartzell, 2005–06
- Cary Eades, 2012–13

USHL General Manager of the Year

- Bob Motzko, 1999–2000
- Tony Gasparini, 2025–26

USHL Organization of the Year

- 2001–02, 2005–06, 2013–14, 2014–15, 2017–18, 2019–20

USHL 25th Anniversary Team

- Thomas Vanek, (1979–2004)

== Head coaches ==
Asterisk (*) denotes number of Clark Cups won

- Bob Motzko, 1999–2001
- Tony Gasparini, 2001–2003
- Ted Belisle, 2003 (interim)
- Mark Kaufman, 2003–2005
- Kevin Hartzell, 2005–2012*
- Cary Eades, 2012–2015*
- Scott Owens, 2015–2020*
- Marty Murray, 2020–2022
- Eric Rud, (2022–2024)
- Ryan Cruthers, (2024–present)*
