= Owen Sillinger =

Canadian ice hockey player (born 1997)

- Born: September 23, 1997 (age 28) Vancouver, British Columbia, Canada
- Height: 5 ft 10 in (178 cm)
- Weight: 183 lb (83 kg; 13 st 1 lb)
- Position: Forward
- Shoots: Left
- NHL team (P) Cur. team: Columbus Blue Jackets; Cleveland Monsters (AHL)
- NHL draft: Undrafted
- Playing career: 2022–present

Owen Sillinger (born September 23, 1997) is a Canadian professional ice hockey player who is a forward for the Cleveland Monsters of the American Hockey League (AHL) while under contract to the Columbus Blue Jackets of the National Hockey League (NHL).

== Playing career ==
Undrafted, Sillinger played collegiate hockey with Bemidji State University in the Central Collegiate Hockey Association. He made his professional debut after his four-year career with the Beavers, signing an AHL contract with the Cleveland Monsters at the tail end of the 2021–22 season on March 25, 2022.

After two productive seasons with the Monsters, Sillinger was signed to a one-year, two-way contract with NHL affiliate, the Columbus Blue Jackets on July 1, 2024. In the following 2024–25 season, Sillinger continued his tenure on reassignment with the Monsters before he received his first recall by the Blue Jackets and made his NHL debut in a regular season match against the Seattle Kraken on January 9, 2025.

== Personal life ==
Owen is the first son of Karla (née Dreger) Sillinger and former National Hockey League forward Mike Sillinger.

His father Mike Sillinger notably played 17 seasons as a journeyman in the NHL. The family briefly resided in Phoenix, Arizona, St. Louis, Missouri and Garden City, New York, as Mike's career led him on to play for the Phoenix Coyotes, St. Louis Blues, and New York Islanders, respectively.

Sillinger was born in Vancouver, British Columbia, when his father was playing for the Canucks, but grew up in Regina, Saskatchewan.

Sillinger has two younger brothers who play hockey. Cole is also a member of the Columbus Blue Jackets, and Lukas skates with Arizona State University.

== Career statistics ==
			Regular season					Playoffs
Season	Team	League	GP	G	A	Pts	PIM	GP	G	A	Pts	PIM
2012–13	Regina Pat Canadians	SMAAAHL	1	0	0	0	0	—	—	—	—	—
2013–14	Regina Pat Canadians	SMAAAHL	36	18	9	27	47	9	1	11	12	6
2014–15	Regina Pat Canadians	SMAAAHL	42	25	39	64	59	6	3	8	11	2
2014–15	Melville Millionaires	SJHL	3	0	0	0	0	—	—	—	—	—
2015–16	Penticton Vees	BCHL	58	16	29	45	18	11	3	2	5	0
2016–17	Penticton Vees	BCHL	57	17	24	41	34	21	3	6	9	4
2017–18	Pentiction Vees	BCHL	56	33	34	67	36	11	5	3	8	2
2018–19	Bemidji State University	WCHA	38	10	9	19	34	—	—	—	—	—
2019–20	Bemidji State University	WCHA	37	14	20	34	36	—	—	—	—	—
2020–21	Bemidji State University	WCHA	20	10	5	15	14	—	—	—	—	—
2021–22	Bemidji State University	CCHA	39	17	30	47	41	—	—	—	—	—
2021–22	Cleveland Monsters	AHL	17	3	6	9	4	—	—	—	—	—
2022–23	Cleveland Monsters	AHL	72	11	25	36	60	—	—	—	—	—
2023–24	Cleveland Monsters	AHL	69	11	29	40	66	14	3	3	6	2
2024–25	Cleveland Monsters	AHL	44	11	18	29	18	—	—	—	—	—
2024–25	Columbus Blue Jackets	NHL	1	0	0	0	2	—	—	—	—	—
2025–26	Cleveland Monsters	AHL	69	14	20	34	50	9	1	3	4	7
NHL totals			1	0	0	0	2	—	—	—	—	—

== Awards and honours ==
Award	Year
SMAAAHL
Second All-Star Team	2015
Telus Cup Top Forward	2015
Telus Cup MVP	2015
Collegiate
WCHA All-Rookie Team	2019
WCHA Third All-star Team	2020
CCHA Second All-Star Team	2022
