= 2014 NCHC Tournament =

2014 NCHC Men's ice hockey tournament
- Dates: March 13–22, 2014
- Teams: 8
- Finals site: Target Center; Minneapolis, Minnesota
- Champions: Denver (1st title)
- Winning coach: Jim Montgomery (1st title)
- MVP: Daniel Doremus (Denver)
- NCHC Men's Ice Hockey Tournaments

The 2014 NCHC Tournament was the first tournament in league history. It was played between March 13 and March 22, 2014. Quarterfinal games were played at home team campus sites, while the final four games were played at the Target Center in Minneapolis, Minnesota. By winning the tournament, Denver received the NCHC's automatic bid to the 2014 NCAA Division I Men's Ice Hockey Tournament.

== Format ==
The tournament features three rounds of play. In the quarterfinals the first seed and eighth seed, the second seed and seventh seed, the third seed and sixth seed and the fourth seed and fifth seed play a best-of-three series with the winners advancing to the semifinals. After the opening round every series becomes a single-elimination game. In the semifinals, the highest and lowest remaining seeds and second highest and second lowest seeds are matched against one another with the winners advancing to the championship game and the loser advancing to the third place game. The tournament champion receives an automatic bid to the 2014 NCAA Division I Men's Ice Hockey Tournament.

=== Regular season standings ===
Note: GP = Games played; W = Wins; L = Losses; T = Ties; SOW = Shootout Wins; PTS = Points; GF = Goals For; GA = Goals Against

2013–14 National Collegiate Hockey Conference standings
| | Conference record | | | | | | | | Overall record | | | | | |
| | GP | W | L | T | SOW | PTS | GF | GA | GP | W | L | T | GF | GA |
|---|---|---|---|---|---|---|---|---|---|---|---|---|---|---|
| #8 St. Cloud State^{†} | 24 | 15 | 6 | 3 | 0 | 48 | 87 | 64 | 38 | 22 | 11 | 5 | 136 | 107 |
| #13 North Dakota | 24 | 15 | 9 | 0 | 0 | 45 | 76 | 63 | 42 | 25 | 14 | 3 | 127 | 102 |
| Omaha | 24 | 13 | 9 | 2 | 1 | 42 | 82 | 69 | 37 | 17 | 18 | 2 | 117 | 120 |
| Minnesota–Duluth | 24 | 11 | 11 | 2 | 2 | 37 | 69 | 70 | 36 | 16 | 16 | 4 | 104 | 104 |
| Western Michigan | 24 | 11 | 11 | 2 | 2 | 37 | 66 | 69 | 40 | 19 | 16 | 5 | 103 | 106 |
| #17 Denver* | 24 | 10 | 11 | 3 | 2 | 35 | 60 | 58 | 42 | 20 | 16 | 6 | 112 | 98 |
| Colorado College | 24 | 6 | 13 | 5 | 1 | 24 | 52 | 72 | 37 | 7 | 24 | 6 | 74 | 121 |
| Miami | 24 | 6 | 17 | 1 | 1 | 20 | 56 | 80 | 38 | 15 | 20 | 3 | 111 | 115 |
Championship: Denver † indicates conference regular season champion; * indicates conference tournament champion Rankings: USCHO.com Top 20 Poll; updated March 23, 2014

== Bracket ==
Teams are reseeded after the Quarterfinals

Quarterfinals; March 13–16
1 | St. Cloud State | 4 | 3 | —
8 | Miami | 5* | 4 | —
2 | North Dakota | 4 | 2 | 4
7 | Colorado College | 2 | 3* | 3
(Pairings are reseeded after the first round)
3 | Omaha | 4 | 1 | 0
6 | Denver | 2 | 5 | 2
4 | Minnesota-Duluth | 2 | 3 | —
5 | Western Michigan | 3 | 4 | —

Semifinals; March 21
2 | North Dakota | 0
8 | Miami | 3
5 | Western Michigan | 3
6 | Denver | 4

Championship; March 22
6 | Denver | 4
8 | Miami | 3
Third Place
2 | North Dakota | 5
5 | Western Michigan | 0

* denotes overtime periods

== Results ==
=== Quarterfinals ===
==== (1) St. Cloud State vs. (8) Miami ====
| March 14 | St. Cloud State | 4 – 5 | OT | Miami | Herb Brooks National Hockey Center | Recap |
| (Murray, Tedesco) Tim Daly - 08:29 | | First period | | 02:40 - Kevin Morris (Wideman, Doherty) |
| No scoring | | Second period | | 04:07 - SH - Chris Joyaux (Kuraly, Barber) |
| (Daly, Morley) Kevin Gravel - 00:31 (Murray, Prow) Nic Dowd - 10:39 (Dowd, Kossila) Kevin Gravel - EA PP - 19:59 | | Third period | | 06:49 - PP - Cody Murphy (Czarnik, Greenberg); 11:06 - Sean Kuraly (Louis Barber) |
| No scoring | | First overtime period | | 10:10 - GW - Riley Barber (Kuraly, Kossila) |
| ( 23 saves / 27 shots ) Ryan Faragher / ( 7 saves / 8 shots ) Charlie Lindgren | | Goalie stats | | Ryan McKay ( 29 saves / 33 shots ) |

| March 15 | St. Cloud State | 3 – 4 | Miami | Herb Brooks National Hockey Center |
| No Scoring | | First period | No scoring |
| (unassisted) Kevin Gravel - 10:30 (Morley, Prow) Jimmy Murray - 17:22 | | Second period | No scoring |
| (Gravel, Kossila) Nic Dowd - PP - 09:20 | | Third period | 03:59 - Sean Kuraly (Barber, Joyaux); 07:42 - Austin Czarnik (Coleman, Murphy); 12:08 - PP - Anthony Louis (Barber, Kuraly); 19:57 - GW - Justin Greenberg (Louis, Joyaux) |
| ( 26 saves / 30 shots ) Ryan Faragher | | Goalie stats | Ryan McKay ( 25 saves / 28 shots ) |

| Miami won series 2–0 |

==== (2) North Dakota vs. (7) Colorado College ====
| March 14 | North Dakota | 4 – 2 | Colorado College | Ralph Engelstad Arena | Recap |
| (MacMillan, LaDue) Drake Caggiula - 12:11 | | First period | 01:15 - Sam Rothstein (Stoykewych, Olofsson); 07:05 - Aaron Harstad (Slavin, Rothstein) |
| (MacMillan, Caggiula) Michael Parks - PP - 07:14 (unassisted) Bryn Chyzyk - GW - 18:07 | | Second period | No scoring |
| (Schmaltz, Rodwell) Brendan O'Donnell - 08:08 | | Third period | No scoring |
| ( 20 saves / 22 shots ) Zane Gothberg | | Goalie stats | Josh Thorimbert ( 18 saves / 22 shots ) |

| March 15 | North Dakota | 2 – 3 | OT | Colorado College | Ralph Engelstad Arena | Recap |
| No Scoring | | First period | | 16:43 - Peter Stoykewych (unassisted) |
| (Mattson) Drake Caggiula - 03:45 | | Second period | | 01:17 - Scott Wamsganz (Stoykewych) |
| (Caggiula, MacMillan) Jordan Schmaltz - 16:04 | | Third period | | No scoring |
| No scoring | | First overtime period | | 07:00 - GW - Alex Roos (Rothstein, Wamsganz) |
| ( 26 saves / 29 shots ) Zane Gothberg | | Goalie stats | | Josh Thorimbert ( 44 saves / 46 shots ) |

| March 16 | North Dakota | 4 – 3 | Colorado College | Ralph Engelstad Arena | Recap |
| (Pattyn, Rodwell) Nick Mattson - 03:41 (Thompson, Grimaldi) Troy Stecher - 10:06 (Gaarder, Rodwell) Stephane Pattyn - 12:22 | | First period | 06:41 - Alexander Krushelnyski (Bradley, Slavin) |
| No scoring | | Second period | 17:17 - Michael Morin (Collett) |
| (Grimaldi) Brendan O'Donnell - GW - 02:29 | | Third period | 18:31 - EA - Alex Roos (Slavin, Skalbeck) |
| ( 26 saves / 30 shots ) Zane Gothberg | | Goalie stats | Josh Thorimbert ( 27 saves / 30 shots ) |

| North Dakota won series 2–1 |

==== (3) Nebraska-Omaha vs. (6) Denver ====
| March 13 | Nebraska-Omaha | 4 – 3 | Denver | CenturyLink Center |
| (Montpetit, Parizek) Ryan Walters - 18:14 (Brady, Guentzel) Dominic Zombo - PP - 19:22 | | First period | 07:27 - David Makowski (Butcher, Marcinew) |
| (Walters, Cooper) Brock Montpetit - PP - 18:19 | | Second period | 02:34 - Ty Loney (Doremus) |
| (Walters, Megna) Brock Montpetit - GW PP - 10:57 | | Third period | 02:41 - Joey LaLeggia (Moore, Zajac) |
| ( 24 saves / 27 shots ) Ryan Massa | | Goalie stats | Sam Brittain ( 26 saves / 30 shots ) |

| March 14 | Nebraska-Omaha | 1 – 5 | Denver | CenturyLink Center |
| No Scoring | | First period | No scoring |
| No scoring | | Second period | 13:38 - Evan Janssen (Loney, Marcinew); 18:43 - GW - Trevor Moore (Loney, Doremus) |
| (Guentzel, Zombo) Brian Cooper - 01:10 | | Third period | 06:15 - Matt Tabrum (Arnold); 07:04 - Matt Marcinew (Makowski, Loney); 13:25 - PP - Will Butcher (unassisted) |
| ( 20 saves / 24 shots ) Ryan Massa / ( 4 saves / 5 shots ) Kirk Thompson | | Goalie stats | Sam Brittain ( 30 saves / 31 shots ) / Evan Cowley ( 2 saves / 2 shots ) |

| March 15 | Nebraska-Omaha | 0 – 2 | Denver | CenturyLink Center |
| No Scoring | | First period | No scoring |
| No scoring | | Second period | No scoring |
| No scoring | | Third period | 06:16 - GW - Ty Loney (Doremus, Didier); 18:09 - EN - Zac Larraza (Makowski) |
| ( 27 saves / 28 shots ) Ryan Massa | | Goalie stats | Sam Brittain ( 34 saves / 34 shots ) |

| Denver won series 2–1 |

==== (4) Minnesota-Duluth vs. (5) Western Michigan ====
| March 14 | Minnesota-Duluth | 2 – 3 | Western Michigan | AMSOIL Arena |
| No Scoring | | First period | 17:25 - PP - Sam Mellor (Oesterle, LaPorte) |
| No scoring | | Second period | No scoring |
| (Corrin, Molenaar) Cal Decowski - 18:30 (Crandall) Max Tardy - EA - 19:44 | | Third period | 00:25 - Colton Hargrove (LaPorte, Kessel); 18:18 - GW EN - Will Kessel (Dries) |
| ( 19 saves / 21 shots ) Aaron Crandall | | Goalie stats | Lukas Hafner ( 31 saves / 33 shots ) |

| March 15 | Minnesota-Duluth | 3 – 4 | Western Michigan | AMSOIL Arena |
| (Crandall) Tony Cameranesi - 01:21 (Molenaar, Toninato) Adam Krause - 14:47 | | First period | 15:35 - PP - Shane Berschbach (Balisy, Brown) |
| (Herbert, Farley) Joe Bassaraba - 12:00 | | Second period | 05:25 - Chase Balisy (Dries, Cichy) |
| No scoring | | Third period | 06:22 - Justin Kovacs (Berschbach, Balisy); 07:49 - GW - Kenney Morrison (Brown, Balisy) |
| ( 7 saves / 11 shots ) Aaron Crandall | | Goalie stats | Frank Slubowski ( 34 saves / 37 shots ) |

| Western Michigan won series 2–0 |

=== Semifinals ===
==== (2) North Dakota vs. (8) Miami ====
| March 21 | North Dakota | 0 – 3 | Miami | Target Center | Recap |
| No Scoring | | First period | 11:24 - GW PP - Blake Coleman (Caito) |
| No scoring | | Second period | 19:33 - Austin Czarnik (Coleman) |
| No scoring | | Third period | 06:13 - Anthony Louis (Barber) |
| ( 25 saves / 28 shots ) Zane Gothberg | | Goalie stats | Ryan McKay ( 32 saves / 32 shots ) |

==== (5) Western Michigan vs. (6) Denver ====
| March 21 | Western Michigan | 3 – 4 | Denver | Target Center | Recap |
| (Oesterle, Hargrove) Nolan LaPorte - 00:42 | | First period | 08:34 - Daniel Doremus (Didier); 13:03 - Grant Arnold (Moore) |
| (Kovacs, Nitsche) Shane Berschbach - 06:11 (Dienes) Will Kessel - 18:06 | | Second period | 19:56 - Joey LaLeggia (Didier, Doremus) |
| No scoring | | Third period | 15:07 - GW - Ty Loney (unassisted) |
| ( 24 saves / 27 shots ) Sam Brittain | | Goalie stats | Frank Slubowski ( 19 saves / 23 shots ) |

=== Third place ===
==== (2) North Dakota vs. (5) Western Michigan ====
| March 22 | North Dakota | 5 – 0 | Western Michigan | Target Center | Recap |
| (Thompson, O'Donnell) Connor Gaarder - GW - 01:42 (Pattyn, Stecher) Connor Gaarder - 10:27 | | First period | No scoring |
| No scoring | | Second period | No scoring |
| (Simpson, Johnson) Jordan Schmaltz - 11:00 (Pattyn, Mattson) Rocco Grimaldi - 13:30 (Mattson, O'Donnell) Paul LaDue - PP - 14:53 | | Third period | No scoring |
| ( 25 saves / 25 shots ) Zane Gothberg | | Goalie stats | Frank Slubowski ( 24 saves / 29 shots ) |

=== Championship ===
==== (6) Denver vs. (8) Miami ====
| March 22 | Denver | 4 – 3 | Miami | Target Center | Recap |
| (Larraza, Butcher) Nolan Zajac - PP - 03:13 (Zajac, Loney) Daniel Doremus - 13:48 | | First period | No scoring |
| No scoring | | Second period | 13:08 - PP - Anthony Louis (Kuraly, Wideman); 16:08 - Sean Kuraly (unassisted) |
| (unassisted) Zac Larraza - 01:06 (Marcinew) Emil Romig - GW - 06:47 | | Third period | 18:27 - EA - Anthony Louis (Coleman, Czarnik) |
| ( 23 saves / 26 shots ) Sam Brittain | | Goalie stats | Ryan McKay ( 24 saves / 28 shots ) |

== Tournament awards ==
=== All-Tournament Team ===
- F Daniel Doremus* (Denver)
- F Ty Loney (Denver)
- F Anthony Louis (Miami)
- D Joey LaLeggia (Denver)
- D Nolan Zajac (Denver)
- G Sam Brittain (Denver)

* Most Valuable Player(s)
