= Sam Brittain =

Canadian ice hockey player (born 1992)

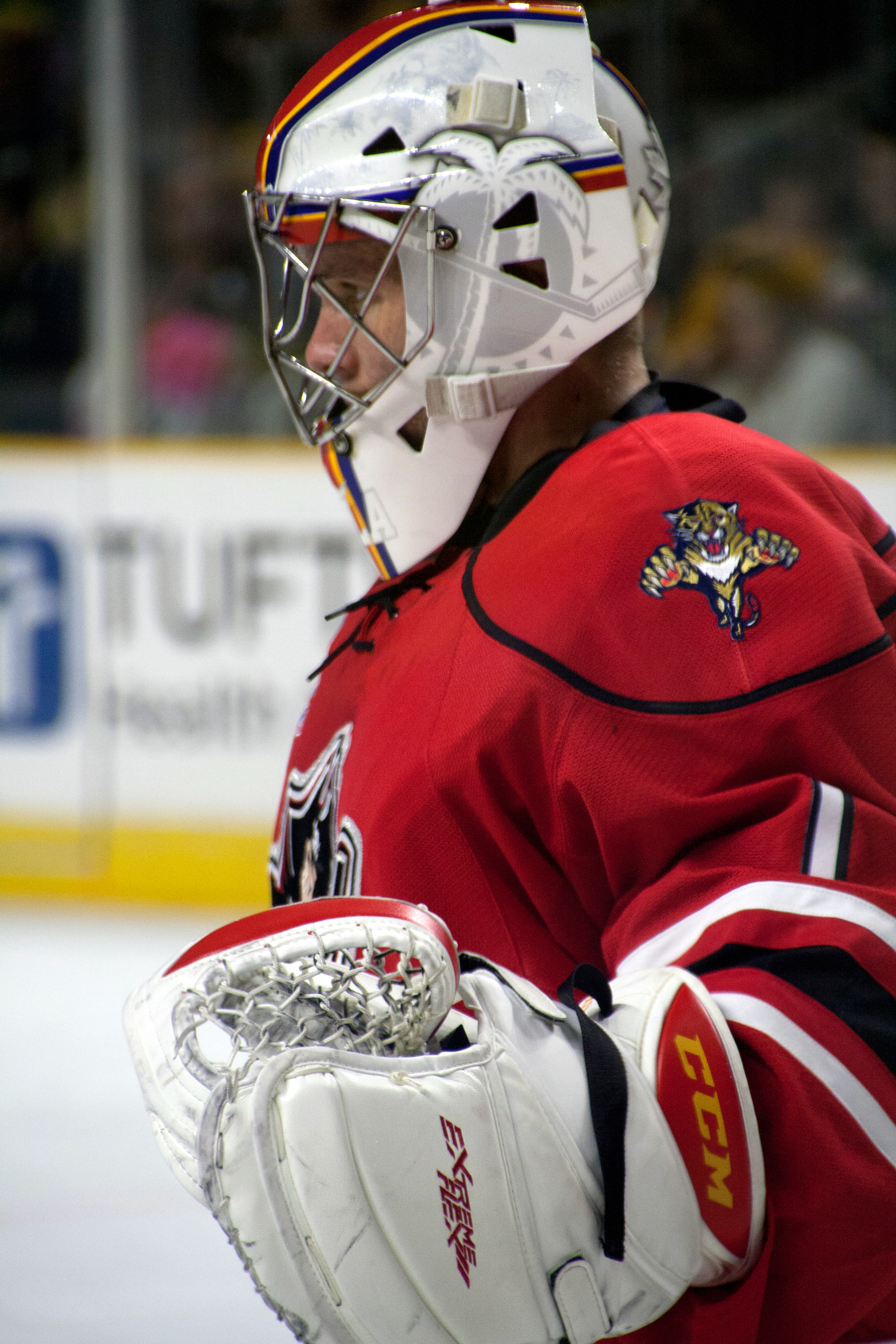
- Brittain with the Portland Pirates in 2015
- Born: May 10, 1992 (age 33) Calgary, Alberta, Canada
- Height: 6 ft 1 in (185 cm)
- Weight: 216 lb (98 kg; 15 st 6 lb)
- Position: Goaltender
- Caught: Left
- Played for: San Antonio Rampage; Portland Pirates; Springfield Thunderbirds
- NHL draft: 92nd overall, 2010; Florida Panthers
- Playing career: 2014–2018

Sam Brittain (born May 10, 1992) is a Canadian former professional ice hockey goaltender who played in the American Hockey League (AHL). He most notably played as a prospect within the Florida Panthers organization of the National Hockey League (NHL). He was selected by the Panthers in the 4th round (92nd overall) of the 2010 NHL entry draft.

== Playing career ==
Brittain played collegiate hockey for the Denver Pioneers in the NCAA Men's Division I National Collegiate Hockey Conference (NCHC). In his senior year, Brittain's outstanding play was rewarded with a selection to the inaugural 2013–14 All-NCHC First Team.

At the conclusion of his entry-level contract with the Panthers, Brittain was not tendered a qualifying offer and was released to free agency. On August 21, 2017, Brittain signed a one-year AHL contract in a return to the San Antonio Rampage.

== Career statistics ==
			Regular season									Playoffs
Season	Team	League	GP	W	L	T/OT	MIN	GA	SO	GAA	SV%	GP	W	L	MIN	GA	SO	GAA	SV%
2008–09	Canmore Eagles	AJHL	3	1	2	0	76	179	9	3.02	.894	—	—	—	—	—	—	—	—
2009–10	Canmore Eagles	AJHL	52	23	19	8	3065	167	2	3.27	.896	9	5	4	559	28	0	3.01	—
2010–11	University of Denver	WCHA	33	19	9	5	1998	76	1	2.28	.921	—	—	—	—	—	—	—	—
2011–12	University of Denver	WCHA	12	8	4	0	735	29	1	2.36	.932	—	—	—	—	—	—	—	—
2012–13	University of Denver	WCHA	13	5	7	0	751	37	0	2.95	.907	—	—	—	—	—	—	—	—
2013–14	University of Denver	NCHC	39	19	14	6	2347	87	5	2.22	.929	—	—	—	—	—	—	—	—
2014–15	Cincinnati Cyclones	ECHL	27	14	11	1	1547	70	4	2.71	.895	—	—	—	—	—	—	—	—
2014–15	San Antonio Rampage	AHL	7	4	2	1	374	11	1	1.76	.943	—	—	—	—	—	—	—	—
2015–16	Portland Pirates	AHL	25	8	10	3	1313	61	0	2.79	.906	—	—	—	—	—	—	—	—
2016–17	Springfield Thunderbirds	AHL	10	4	5	0	546	22	0	2.42	.905	—	—	—	—	—	—	—	—
2016–17	Manchester Monarchs	ECHL	36	20	9	5	2011	110	0	3.28	.896	19	11	8	1132	44	1	2.33	.925
2017–18	Colorado Eagles	ECHL	27	14	9	2	1525	81	0	3.19	.897	1	0	1	28	2	0	4.22	.818
2017–18	San Antonio Rampage	AHL	1	0	1	0	58	4	0	4.11	.862	—	—	—	—	—	—	—	—
AHL totals			43	16	18	4	2291	98	1	2.57	.911	—	—	—	—	—	—	—	—

== Awards and honours ==
Award	Year
College
All-WCHA Rookie Team	2010–11
WCHA All-Tournament Team	2011
All-NCHC First Team	2013–14
AHCA West First-Team All-American	2013–14
NCHC All-Tournament Team	2014
ECHL
Kelly Cup (Colorado Eagles)	2018

Awards and achievements
Preceded by Award Created	NCHC Goaltender of the Year; 2013–14	Succeeded by Zane McIntyre
