= 2011–12 USHL season =

2011–12 USHL Season
- League: United States Hockey League
- Sport: Ice hockey
- Duration: September 30, 2011 – May 23, 2012
- Games: 60
- Teams: 16

Draft
- Top draft pick: Brian Christie
- Picked by: Chicago Steel

Regular season
- Anderson Cup: Green Bay Gamblers
- Season MVP: Kevin Roy (Lincoln Stars)
- Top scorer: Kevin Roy (Lincoln Stars)

Playoffs
- Playoffs MVP: Sam Herr (Gamblers)
- Finals champions: Green Bay Gamblers
- Runners-up: Waterloo Black Hawks

USHL seasons
- 2010–11 2012–13

The 2011–12 USHL season is the 33rd season of the United States Hockey League as an all-junior league. The regular season began on September 30, 2011, and concluded on April 14, 2012, with the regular season champion winning the Anderson Cup.

The playoffs began on April 16, 2012, and completed on May 23, 2012. The top six teams from each conference competed for the Clark Cup.

This season was the 20th season in which the same team captured both the Anderson Cup and the Clark Cup in the same season. It was the third time the Green Bay Gamblers accomplished this feat (1995–96, 2009–10, and the 2011–12 seasons).

== Regular season ==
Final standings reflect games played through April 14, 2012

Note: GP = Games played; W = Wins; L = Losses; OTL = Overtime losses; SL = Shootout losses; GF = Goals for; GA = Goals against; PTS = Points; x = clinched playoff berth; y = clinched conference title; z = clinched regular season title

=== Eastern Conference ===
Team	GP	W	L	OTL	PTS	GF	GA
z-Green Bay Gamblers	60	47	9	4	98	250	138
x-Indiana Ice	60	36	15	9	81	221	183
x-Dubuque Fighting Saints	60	36	20	4	76	189	169
x-Youngstown Phantoms	60	32	21	7	71	202	196
x-Cedar Rapids RoughRiders	60	27	21	12	66	195	189
x-Team USA	60	26	29	5	57	192	222
Chicago Steel	60	25	31	4	54	177	210
Muskegon Lumberjacks	60	17	35	8	42	164	238

=== Western Conference ===
Team	GP	W	L	OTL	PTS	GF	GA
y-Lincoln Stars	60	38	18	4	80	214	172
x-Omaha Lancers	60	38	19	3	79	213	173
x-Waterloo Black Hawks	60	35	19	6	76	213	189
x-Fargo Force	60	31	23	6	68	188	160
x-Sioux City Musketeers	60	29	30	1	59	181	189
x-Tri-City Storm	60	26	33	1	53	164	200
Des Moines Buccaneers	60	20	33	7	47	168	215
Sioux Falls Stampede	60	17	36	7	41	127	215

== Players ==
Final statistics reflect games played through April 14, 2012

=== Scoring leaders ===
Note: GP = Games played; G = Goals; A = Assists; Pts = Points; +/- = Plus/Minus Rating; PIM = Penalty minutes

Player	Team	GP	G	A	Pts	+/-	PIM
Kevin Roy	Lincoln Stars	59	54	50	104	+44	50
Daniil Tarasov	Indiana Ice	60	47	41	88	+31	86
Alex Broadhurst	Green Bay Gamblers	53	26	47	73	+32	40
Nolan LaPorte	Green Bay Gamblers	57	36	34	70	+35	58
Sean Kuraly	Indiana Ice	54	32	38	70	+13	48
Taylor Cammarata	Waterloo Black Hawks	60	27	42	69	+1	6
Jimmy Murray	Omaha Lancers	60	19	49	68	+6	38
Mike Ambrosia	Youngstown Phantoms	60	18	47	65	+10	71
Casey Bailey	Omaha Lancers	60	27	33	60	+4	83
Austin Cangelosi	Youngstown Phantoms	53	29	30	59	+18	40
Austin Farley	Fargo Force	51	28	31	59	+14	71

=== Leading goaltenders ===
Note: GP = Games played; Mins = Minutes played; W = Wins; L = Losses: OTL = Overtime losses; SL = Shootout losses; GA = Goals Allowed; SO = Shutouts; SV% = Save percentage; GAA = Goals against average

Player	Team	GP	Mins	W	L	OTL	GA	SO	SV%	GAA
Ryan McKay	Green Bay Gamblers	35	2034:08	27	5	3	74	2	0.920	2.18
Zane Gothberg	Fargo Force	46	2757:47	26	16	4	102	7	0.921	2.22
Matt Morris	Dubuque Fighting Saints	38	2043:42	19	13	2	88	3	0.894	2.58
Charles Williams	Lincoln Stars	32	1725:10	20	4	3	75	4	0.907	2.61
Jackson Teichroeb	Lincoln Stars	35	1883:45	18	14	1	84	3	0.896	2.68

== Clark Cup Playoffs ==
Conference Quarter-finals (Best of 3)	Conference Semi-finals (Best of 5)
1	Green Bay	3
4	Youngstown	1
5	Cedar Rapids	0
4	Youngstown	2
Eastern Conference
3	Dubuque	2
6	Team USA	0
3	Dubuque	0
2	Indiana	3
1	Lincoln	3
4	Fargo	1
5	Sioux City	0
4	Fargo	2
Western Conference
3	Waterloo	2
6	Tri-City	0
3	Waterloo	3
2	Omaha	1

Conference Finals (Best of 5)
1	Green Bay	3
2	Indiana	0
1	Lincoln	1
3	Waterloo	3

Clark Cup Championship (Best of 5)
E1	Green Bay	3
W3	Waterloo	2

== Conference Quarterfinals ==
=== Eastern Conference ===
==== (3) Dubuque Fighting Saints vs. (6) Team USA ====
April 16	Dubuque Fighting Saints	6 – 3	Team USA	Mystique Ice Center	Recap
16:08 - pp - Kevin Morris (1)		First period	No scoring
17:24 - sh - Tyler Lundey (1); 18:47 - Zemgus Girgensons (1)		Second period	Tyler Kelleher (1) - 0:40; Tyler Motte (1) - pp - 17:46
9:15 - Zemgus Girgensons (2); 14:31 - sh - Tyler Lundey (2); 17:53 - Tyler Lundey (3)		Third period	Hudson Fasching (1) - 6:56
Matt Morris (24 saves / 27 shots)		Goalie stats	Hunter Miska (29 saves / 35 shots)

April 17	Dubuque Fighting Saints	7 – 3	Team USA	Mystique Ice Center	Recap
3:30 - Max Gardiner (1); 9:02 - pp - T.J. Moor (1); 17:44 - Jonathan Davis (1)		First period	Miles Koules (1) - 5:01; Tyler Motte (2) - sh - 18:46
16:50 - sh - Mike Matheson (1)		Second period	No scoring
12:16 - Michael Downing (1); 19:35 - en - Kevin Morris (2)		Third period	Tyler Kelleher (2) - 14:33
Matt Morris (16 saves / 19 shots)		Goalie stats	Hunter Miska (27 saves / 33 shots)

Dubuque wins series 2 – 0

==== (4) Youngstown Phantoms vs. (5) Cedar Rapids RoughRiders ====
April 16	Youngstown Phantoms	4 – 3	OT	Cedar Rapids RoughRiders	Covelli Centre	Recap
9:24 - Mike Ambrosia (1)		First period		No scoring
No scoring		Second period		Dylan Gareau (1) - 10:18; Ryan McGrath (1) - 13:39
10:05 - J.T. Stenglein (1); 15:55 - Jonathan Liau (1)		Third period		Nick Saracino (1) - sh - 13:24
6:18 - Austin Cangelosi (1)		First overtime period		No scoring
Matt O'Connor (15 saves / 18 shots)		Goalie stats		Jake Hildebrand (38 saves / 42 shots)

April 17	Youngstown Phantoms	6 – 2	Cedar Rapids RoughRiders	Covelli Centre	Recap
12:11 - Todd Koritzinsky (1)		First period	Davey Middleton (1) - 15:43
4:55 - Alex Gacek (1); 10:39 - Alex Gacek (2)		Second period	No scoring
11:46 - Soren Jonzzon (1); 17:45 - en - Austin Cangelosi (2); 19:48 - en - Alex Gacek (3)		Third period	Gerald Mayhew (1) - 10:18
Matt O'Connor (30 saves / 32 shots)		Goalie stats	Jake Hildebrand (34 saves / 38 shots)

Youngstown wins series 2 – 0

=== Western Conference ===
==== (3) Waterloo Black Hawks vs. (6) Tri-City Storm ====
April 16	Waterloo Black Hawks	6 – 4	Tri-City Storm	Young Arena	Recap
2:29 - Taylor Cammarata (1); 5:08 - Mike Huntebrinker (1)		First period	Tim Bonner (1) - 2:57; Joshua Henke (1) - 5:32
8:16 - sh - Jamie Hill (1); 14:03 - Taylor Cammarata (2); 18:16 - Tony Cameranesi (1)		Second period	No scoring
3:28 - pp - Jamie Hill (2)		Third period	Nick Lappin (1) - pp - 6:19; Bryan Sinz (1) - 17:15
Stephon Williams (17 saves / 21 shots)		Goalie stats	Adam Wilcox (20 saves / 26 shots)

April 17	Waterloo Black Hawks	3 – 2	Tri-City Storm	Young Arena	Recap
1:39 - Aaron Pearce (1); 4:29 - Taylor Cammarata (3); 10:19 - pp - Mark Naclerio (1)		First period	No scoring
No scoring		Second period	Kenny Brooks (1) - 0:33
No scoring		Third period	Kenny Brooks (2) - 2:17
Stephon Williams (24 saves / 26 shots)		Goalie stats	Adam Wilcox (28 saves / 31 shots)

Waterloo wins series 2 – 0

==== (4) Fargo Force vs. (5) Sioux City Musketeers ====
April 16	Fargo Force	2 – 1	OT	Sioux City Musketeers	Scheels Arena	Recap
0:20 - Gabe Guertler (1)		First period		No scoring
No scoring		Second period		No scoring
No scoring		Third period		Tim OBrien (1) - 9:07
2:42 - Willie Corrin (1)		First overtime period		No scoring
Zane Gothberg (26 saves / 27 shots)		Goalie stats		Matt Skoff (34 saves / 36 shots)

April 17	Fargo Force	5 – 1	Sioux City Musketeers	Scheels Arena	Recap
No scoring		First period	No scoring
0:42 - Alex Iafallo (1); 9:38 - Nate Arentz (1)		Second period	No scoring
0:56 - Austin Farley (1); 8:28 - Dave Gust (1); 10:36 - pp - Dave Gust (2)		Third period	Jordan Boucher (1)
Zane Gothberg (27 saves / 28 shots)		Goalie stats	Matt Skoff (33 saves / 38 shots)

Fargo wins series 2 – 0

== Conference semifinals ==
=== Eastern Conference ===
==== (1) Green Bay Gamblers vs. (4) Youngstown Phantoms ====
April 21	Green Bay Gamblers	7 – 1	Youngstown Phantoms	Resch Center	Recap
1:58 - Alex Broadhurst (1); 4:19 - Grant Arnold (1); 15:12 - Andy Welinski (1); 19:35 - Alex Kile (1)		First period	Jonathan Liau (2) - 5:23
11:13 - pp - Markus Lauridsen (1); 13:23 - Alex Kile (2); 17:30 - Ville Järveläinen (1)		Second period	No scoring
No scoring		Third period	No scoring
Ryan McKay (19 saves / 20 shots); Michael Rotolo (11 saves / 11 shots)		Goalie stats	Matt O'Connor (10 saves / 14 shots); Sean Romeo (11 saves / 14 shots)

April 22	Green Bay Gamblers	3 – 5	Youngstown Phantoms	Resch Center	Recap
5:30 - Markus Lauridsen (2)		First period	Dylan Margonari (1) - 4:49
3:35 - Jordan Schmaltz (1)		Second period	Soren Jonzzon (2) - pp - 6:18; Austin Cangelosi (3) - pp - 14:31
2:42 - Alex Broadhurst (2)		Third period	Soren Jonzzon (3) - pp - 4:40; Dylan Margonari (2) - 18:45
Ryan McKay (19 saves / 24 shots)		Goalie stats	Matt O'Connor (40 saves / 43 shots)

April 24	Youngstown Phantoms	3 – 6	Green Bay Gamblers	Covelli Centre	Recap
16:38 - Todd Koritzinsky (2)		First period	Alex Broadhurst (3) - sh - 2:41; Sheldon Dries (1) - 19:35
No scoring		Second period	C.J. Eick (1) - 5:18; Grant Arnold (2) - 8:51; Alex Broadhurst (4) - sh - 18:50
6:21 - Ryan Belonger (1); 13:05 - pp - J.T. Stenglein (2)		Third period	Alex Broadhurst (5) - sh - 13:34
Matt O'Connor (27 saves / 33 shots)		Goalie stats	Ryan McKay (16 saves / 19 shots)

April 25	Youngstown Phantoms	1 – 4	Green Bay Gamblers	Covelli Centre	Recap
1:35 - Mike Ambrosia (2)		First period	No scoring
No scoring		Second period	No scoring
No scoring		Third period	Nolan LaPorte (1) - 8:34; Sam Herr (1) - 12:23; Grant Arnold (3) - en - 19:11; Sam Herr (2) - en - 19:46
Matt O'Connor (40 saves / 42 shots)		Goalie stats	Ryan McKay (19 saves / 20 shots)

Green Bay wins series 3 – 1

==== (2) Indiana Ice vs. (3) Dubuque Fighting Saints ====
April 20	Indiana Ice	5 – 2	Dubuque Fighting Saints	Pepsi Coliseum	Recap
5:52 - Jacob Fallon (1); 9:48 - Robert Polesello (1)		First period	Mike Matheson (2) - pp - 7:38
17:53 - John Doherty (1)		Second period	Gerard Hanson (1) - 1:33
11:27 - Christian Hilbrich (1); 16:41 - Robbie Baillargeon (1)		Third period	No scoring
Jon Gillies (26 saves / 28 shots)		Goalie stats	Matt Morris (22 saves / 27 shots)

April 21	Indiana Ice	6 – 3	Dubuque Fighting Saints	Pepsi Coliseum	Recap
13:58 - Robbie Baillargeon (2); 16:33 - Daniil Tarasov (1)		First period	No scoring
12:40 - pp - Daniil Tarasov (2); 19:42 - Daniil Tarasov (3)		Second period	Cody Bradley (1) - 0:21; Mike Matheson (3) - 16:27; Mike Matheson (4) - pp - 19:16
4:50 - Christian Hilbrich (2); 5:14 - Sean Kuraly (1)		Third period	No scoring
Jon Gillies (34 saves / 37 shots)		Goalie stats	Matt Morris (22 saves / 28 shots)

April 25	Dubuque Fighting Saints	1 – 3	Indiana Ice	Mystique Ice Center	Recap
No scoring		First period	Robbie Baillargeon (3) - 13:44
No scoring		Second period	Jacob Fallon (2) - pp - 0:37
12:48 - Tyler Lundey (5)		Third period	Sean Kuraly (2) - en - 19:17
Matt Morris (24 saves / 26 shots)		Goalie stats	Jon Gillies (34 saves / 35 shots)

Indiana wins series 3 – 0

=== Western Conference ===
==== (1) Lincoln Stars vs. (4) Fargo Force ====
April 20	Lincoln Stars	1 – 2	OT	Fargo Force	Ice Box	Recap
0:50 - Jared Hanson (1)		First period		Brian Cooper (1) - 17:03
No scoring		Second period		No scoring
No scoring		Third period		No scoring
No scoring		First overtime period		Alex Iafallo (2) - 5:27
Charles Williams (26 saves / 28 shots)		Goalie stats		Zane Gothberg (25 saves / 26 shots)

April 21	Lincoln Stars	3 – 2	Fargo Force	Ice Box	Recap
5:10 - Dax Lauwers (1); 12:44 - Kevin Roy (1)		First period	Gabe Guertler (2) - 4:14
6:37 - Zach Aston-Reese (1)		Second period	Neal Goff (1) - 5:55
No scoring		Third period	No scoring
Charles Williams (22 saves / 24 shots)		Goalie stats	Zane Gothberg (30 saves / 33 shots)

April 25	Fargo Force	1 – 3	Lincoln Stars	Scheels Arena	Recap
No scoring		First period	Paul LaDue (1) - pp - 9:02; Kevin Roy (2) - 16:42
15:50 - pp - Gabe Guertler (3)		Second period	No scoring
No scoring		Third period	Kevin Roy (3) - en - 19:47
Zane Gothberg (25 saves / 27 shots)		Goalie stats	Charles Williams (22 saves / 23 shots)

April 27	Fargo Force	2 – 3	OT	Lincoln Stars	Scheels Arena	Recap
6:09 - sh - Nate Arentz (2)		First period		No scoring
7:05 - sh - Jonny Brodzinski (1)		Second period		Bob Kinne (1) - 7:51; Jared Hanson (2) - 18:57
No scoring		Third period		No scoring
No scoring		First overtime period		Brad Hawkinson (1) - 5:36
Zane Gothberg (46 saves / 49 shots)		Goalie stats		Charles Williams (18 saves / 20 shots)

Lincoln wins series 3 – 1

==== (2) Omaha Lancers vs. (3) Waterloo Black Hawks ====
April 20	Omaha Lancers	4 – 2	Waterloo Black Hawks	Omaha Civic Auditorium	Recap
13:37 - Jimmy Murray (1)		First period	Aaron Pearce (2) - 13:19
No scoring		Second period	No scoring
6:17 - Victor Newell (1); 10:58 - Kenny Babinski (1); 19:50 - en - Casey Bailey (1)		Third period	Max Edson (1) - 10:11
Alex Lyon (42 saves / 44 shots)		Goalie stats	Stephon Williams (25 saves / 28 shots)

April 21	Omaha Lancers	2 – 4	Waterloo Black Hawks	Omaha Civic Auditorium	Recap
No scoring		First period	Mark Naclerio (2) - 19:05
5:32 - Casey Bailey (2)		Second period	A.J. Michaelson (1) - 6:01
10:48 - Eli Lichtenwald (1)		Third period	Tyler Zepeda (1) - 15:26; Mike Huntebrinker (2) - en - 19:27
Alex Lyon (31 saves / 34 shots)		Goalie stats	Stephon Williams (27 saves / 29 shots)

April 27	Waterloo Black Hawks	4 – 2	Omaha Lancers	Young Arena	Recap
12:54 - Alex Barron (1)		First period	Jimmy Murray (2) - 0:21
16:35 - Taylor Cammarata (4); 19:00 - Tyler Zepeda (2)		Second period	Kevin Schulze (1) - 18:22
5:21 - Mike Huntebrinker (3)		Third period	No scoring
Stephon Williams (25 saves / 27 shots)		Goalie stats	Alex Lyon (27 saves / 31 shots)

April 28	Waterloo Black Hawks	5 – 1	Omaha Lancers	Young Arena	Recap
17:37 - Ian McCoshen (1); 18:36 - Aaron Pearce (3)		First period	Kenny Babinski (2) - 4:17
17:21 - pp - Ian McCoshen (2)		Second period	No scoring
18:18 - sh - en - Aaron Pearce (4); 19:46 - Mike Huntebrinker (4)		Third period	No scoring
Stephon Williams (31 saves / 32 shots)		Goalie stats	Alex Lyon (32 saves / 36 shots)

Waterloo wins series 3 – 1

== Conference finals ==
=== Eastern Conference ===
==== (1) Green Bay Gamblers vs. (2) Indiana Ice ====
May 3	Green Bay Gamblers	6 – 2	Indiana Ice	Resch Center	Recap
No scoring		First period	No scoring
1:01 - Sam Herr (3); 12:02 - pp - Jordan Schmaltz (2); 12:39 - Sam Herr (4)		Second period	Robbie Baillargeon (4) - 13:38; Daniil Tarasov (4) - pp - 19:05
2:30 - Alex Kile (3); 7:02 - pp - Alex Broadhurst (6); 19:59 - sh - Peter Maric (1)		Third period	No scoring
Ryan McKay (39 saves / 41 shots)		Goalie stats	Jon Gillies (21 saves / 27 shots)

May 4	Green Bay Gamblers	3 – 2	Indiana Ice	Resch Center	Recap
No scoring		First period	No scoring
9:04 - Nolan LaPorte (2)		Second period	Daniil Tarasov (5) - 7:00; Sean Kuraly (3) - 9:46
15:44 - Kyle Novak (1); 19:20 - Alex Broadhurst (7)		Third period	No scoring
Ryan McKay (22 saves / 24 shots)		Goalie stats	Jon Gillies (36 saves / 39 shots)

May 6	Indiana Ice	1 – 2	Green Bay Gamblers	Pepsi Coliseum	Recap
No scoring		First period	No scoring
12:48 - Joseph Fiala (1)		Second period	Markus Lauridsen (3) - 4:13
No scoring		Third period	Nicholas Schilkey (1) - pp - 7:44
Jon Gillies (22 saves / 24 shots)		Goalie stats	Ryan McKay (29 saves / 30 shots)

Green Bay wins series 3 – 0

=== Western Conference ===
==== (1) Lincoln Stars vs. (3) Waterloo Black Hawks ====
May 2	Lincoln Stars	2 – 5	Waterloo Black Hawks	Ice Box	Recap
No scoring		First period	A.J. Michaelson (2) - 0:46; Scott MacDonald (1) - 14:49
16:20 - Will Suter (1); 17:45 - pp - Kevin Roy (4)		Second period	Tyler Zepeda (3) - 3:37
No scoring		Third period	Ryan Papa (1) - 3:37; Taylor Cammarata (5) - pp - 17:26
Charles Williams (9 saves / 12 shots); Jackson Teichroeb (15 saves / 17 shots)		Goalie stats	Stephon Williams (32 saves / 34 shots)

May 4	Lincoln Stars	4 – 3	Waterloo Black Hawks	Ice Box	Recap
9:48 - Luke Johnson (1)		First period	Aaron Pearce (5) - pp - 4:10; Jamie Hill (3) - 18:27
14:18 - pp - Tommy Schutt (1)		Second period	Taylor Cammarata (6) - 9:38
4:17 - sh - Kevin Roy (5); 14:08 - Dominik Shine (1)		Third period	No scoring
Charles Williams (25 saves / 28 shots)		Goalie stats	Stephon Williams (37 saves / 41 shots)

May 5	Waterloo Black Hawks	5 – 0	Lincoln Stars	Young Arena	Recap
11:27 - pp - Ryan Papa (2); 14:33 - Mitch Witek (1); 19:47 - Ryan Papa (3)		First period	No scoring
8:49 - Mitch Witek (2)		Second period	No scoring
10:30 - en - Tyler Zepeda (4)		Third period	No scoring
Stephon Williams (23 saves / 23 shots)		Goalie stats	Charles Williams (7 saves / 10 shots); Jackson Teichroeb (23 saves / 24 shots)

May 7	Waterloo Black Hawks	6 – 2	Lincoln Stars	Young Arena	Recap
9:17 - Alex Barron (2); 18:49 - Jamie Hill (4)		First period	No scoring
0:35 - Jamie Hill (5); 13:08 - pp - Ian McCoshen (3)		Second period	No scoring
16:56 - Taylor Cammarata (7); 17:53 - pp - Josh Nenadal (1)		Third period	Kevin Roy (6) - 2:33; Kevin Roy (7) - 11:51
Stephon Williams (29 saves / 31 shots)		Goalie stats	Jackson Teichroeb (25 saves / 31 shots)

Waterloo wins series 3 – 1

== Clark Cup Finals ==
Note 1: All times are local.
Note 2: Game times in italics signify games to be played only if necessary.
Note 3: Home team is listed first.

=== (E1) Green Bay Gamblers vs. (W3) Waterloo Black Hawks ===
May 12	Green Bay Gamblers	1 – 2	Waterloo Black Hawks	Resch Center	Recap
No scoring		First period	Mitch Witek (3) - 1:47
No scoring		Second period	No scoring
14:47 - Kyle Novak (2)		Third period	Mark Naclerio (3) - 0:25
Ryan McKay (24 saves / 26 shots)		Goalie stats	Stephon Williams (37 saves / 38 shots)

May 13	Green Bay Gamblers	2 – 0	Waterloo Black Hawks	Resch Center	Recap
No scoring		First period	No scoring
No scoring		Second period	No scoring
6:52 - Alex Broadhurst (8); 19:18 - en - Alex Kile (4)		Third period	No scoring
Ryan McKay (22 saves / 22 shots)		Goalie stats	Stephon Williams (32 saves / 33 shots)

May 18	Waterloo Black Hawks	1 – 3	Green Bay Gamblers	Young Arena	Recap
No scoring		First period	Sam Herr (5) - 17:59
3:05 - Mitch Witek (4)		Second period	Kyle Novak (3) - 7:38; Grant Arnold (4) - 14:58
No scoring		Third period	No scoring
Stephon Williams (16 saves / 19 shots)		Goalie stats	Ryan McKay (31 saves / 32 shots)

May 19	Waterloo Black Hawks	5 – 3	Green Bay Gamblers	Young Arena	Recap
14:48 - pp - Jamie Hill (6)		First period	Nolan LaPorte (3) - 0:32
0:37 - Taylor Cammarata (8); 12:47 - Ian McCoshen (4)		Second period	Sam Herr (6) - 10:55
17:24 - pp - Jamie Hill (7); 19:31 - en - Jamie Hill (8)		Third period	Andy Welinski (2) - 12:17
Stephon Williams (18 saves / 21 shots)		Goalie stats	Ryan McKay (22 saves / 26 shots)

May 23	Green Bay Gamblers	5 – 2	Waterloo Black Hawks	Resch Center	Recap
16:04 - Max Hartner (1)		First period	No scoring
11:51 - Sam Herr (7); 13:46 - Ville Järveläinen (2)		Second period	Alex Barron (3) - 10:37
9:42 - Nolan LaPorte (4); 13:21 - sh - en - Alex Broadhurst (9)		Third period	Jamie Hill (9) - 19:10
Ryan McKay (22 saves / 24 shots)		Goalie stats	Stephon Williams (28 saves / 32 shots)

Green Bay wins series 3 – 2

== Playoff Statistics ==
Statistics reflect games played through May 23, 2012

=== Scoring leaders ===
Note: GP = Games played; G = Goals; A = Assists; Pts = Points; +/- = Plus/Minus Rating; PIM = Penalty minutes

Player	Team	GP	G	A	Pts	+/-	PIM
Alex Broadhurst	Green Bay Gamblers	12	9	9	18	+16	6
Taylor Cammarata	Waterloo Black Hawks	15	8	8	16	+4	6
Sam Herr	Green Bay Gamblers	12	7	9	16	+13	8
Jamie Hill	Waterloo Black Hawks	15	9	6	15	−1	20
Mitch Witek	Waterloo Black Hawks	15	4	10	14	+10	8
Tyler Zepeda	Waterloo Black Hawks	13	4	8	12	+6	2
Nolan LaPorte	Green Bay Gamblers	12	4	8	12	+11	6
Aaron Pearce	Waterloo Black Hawks	15	5	6	11	+3	20
Kevin Roy	Lincoln Stars	8	7	3	10	−1	4
Daniil Tarasov	Indiana Ice	6	5	5	10	+10	6
Mike Huntebrinker	Waterloo Black Hawks	13	4	6	10	+6	4

=== Leading goaltenders ===
Note: GP = Games played; Mins = Minutes played; W = Wins; L = Losses: OTL = Overtime losses; SL = Shootout losses; GA = Goals Allowed; SO = Shutouts; SV% = Save percentage; GAA = Goals against average

Player	Team	GP	Mins	W	L	GA	SO	SV%	GAA
Zane Gothberg	Fargo Force	6	370:20	3	3	11	0	0.942	1.78
Ryan McKay	Green Bay Gamblers	12	697:18	9	3	24	1	0.922	2.07
Stephon Williams	Waterloo Black Hawks	15	894:54	10	5	34	1	0.922	2.28
Charles Williams	Lincoln Stars	7	334:06	4	3	16	0	0.890	2.71
Jon Gillies	Indiana Ice	6	358:34	3	3	17	0	0.911	2.84

== USHL Awards ==
Award	Name	Team
Rookie of the Year	Taylor Cammarata	Waterloo Black Hawks
Defenseman of the Year	Andy Welinski	Green Bay Gamblers
Forward of the Year	Kevin Roy	Lincoln Stars
Goaltender(s) of the Year	Zane Gothberg; Ryan McKay	Fargo Force; Green Bay Gamblers
Player of the Year	Kevin Roy	Lincoln Stars
Scholar-Athlete	Brian Cooper	Fargo Force
Curt Hammer	Mike Ambrosia	Youngstown Phantoms
Coach of the Year	Derek Lalonde	Green Bay Gamblers
General Manager of the Year	P.K. O'Handley	Waterloo Black Hawks
Executive of the Year	Doug Miller	Waterloo Black Hawks
Organization of the Year		Green Bay Gamblers

== All-USHL teams ==
=== First Team ===
Position	Player	Team
Goalie	Zane Gothberg	Fargo Force
Defense	Andy Welinski	Green Bay Gamblers
Defense	Jordan Schmaltz	Green Bay Gamblers
Forward	Alex Broadhurst	Green Bay Gamblers
Forward	Zemgus Girgensons	Dubuque Fighting Saints
Forward	Kevin Roy	Lincoln Stars
Forward	Daniil Tarasov	Indiana Ice

=== Second Team ===
Position	Player	Team
Goalie	Ryan McKay	Green Bay Gamblers
Defense	Brian Cooper	Fargo Force
Defense	Ralfs Freibergs	Lincoln Stars
Defense	Ryan Obuchowski	Indiana Ice
Forward	Taylor Cammarata	Waterloo Black Hawks
Forward	Sean Kuraly	Indiana Ice
Forward	Nolan LaPorte	Green Bay Gamblers

=== All-Rookie Team ===
Position	Player	Team
Goalie	Alex Lyon	Omaha Lancers
Defense	Mike Matheson	Dubuque Fighting Saints
Defense	Nick Seeler	Des Moines Buccaneers
Defense	Eddie Wittchow	Waterloo Black Hawks
Forward	Taylor Cammarata	Waterloo Black Hawks
Forward	Austin Cangelosi	Youngstown Phantoms
Forward	Kevin Roy	Lincoln Stars
