= Nick Seeler =

American ice hockey player (born 1993)

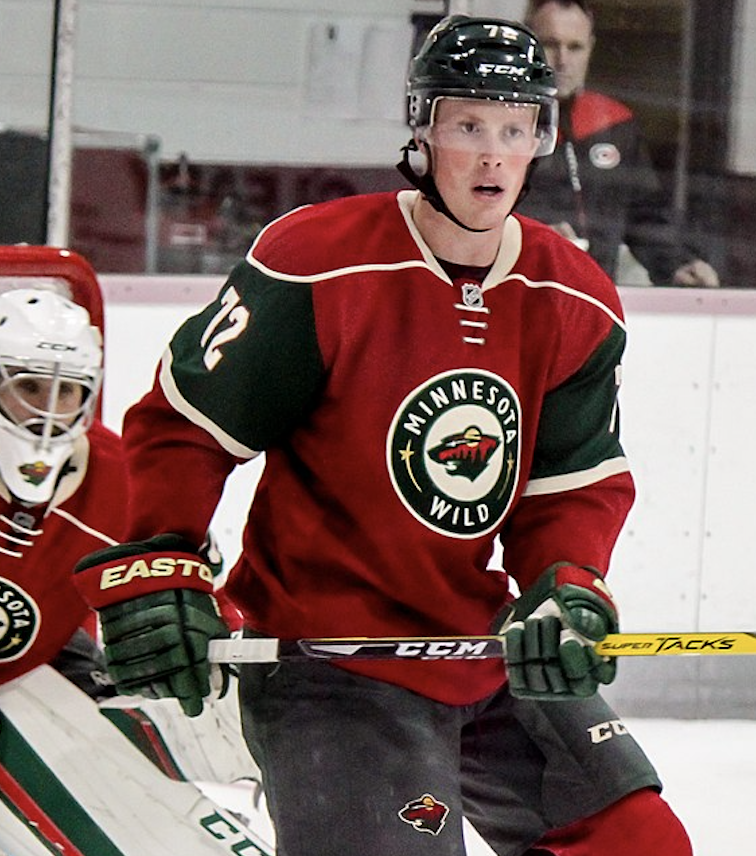
- Seeler with the Minnesota Wild in 2016
- Born: June 3, 1993 (age 33) Eden Prairie, Minnesota, U.S.
- Height: 6 ft 2 in (188 cm)
- Weight: 201 lb (91 kg; 14 st 5 lb)
- Position: Defense
- Shoots: Left
- NHL team Former teams: Philadelphia Flyers; Minnesota Wild; Chicago Blackhawks
- NHL draft: 131st overall, 2011; Minnesota Wild
- Playing career: 2016–present

Nick Seeler (born June 3, 1993) is an American professional ice hockey player who is a defenseman for the Philadelphia Flyers of the National Hockey League (NHL). He was drafted by the Minnesota Wild in the fifth round, 131st overall, in the 2011 NHL entry draft. Prior to turning professional, Seeler played for the University of Nebraska Omaha and University of Minnesota.

== Playing career ==
As a student at Eden Prairie High School for four years, Seeler played on both the junior varsity hockey team and school golf team. However, he saw limited playing time due to his short stature until after a growth spurt in his junior year where he began to develop more as a player. Before graduating, Seeler had been honored as a First-Team All-State selection, an All-Metro First Team choice, All-Lake Conference and a member of the All-Tournament Team in the State Tournament.

=== Junior ===
While in his senior year at Eden Prairie High School, Seeler committed to play NCAA Division 1 hockey for the University of Nebraska Omaha. He was later drafted 131st overall in the 2011 NHL entry draft by the Minnesota Wild. Following the draft, he then went on to play with the Muskegon Lumberjacks and the Des Moines Buccaneers in the United States Hockey League for the 2011–12 USHL season where he was named to the USHL All-Rookie Team. He stated that he felt going through the USHL before joining the collegiate league would be the best way to prepare for the jump from junior hockey to college.

=== College ===
Seeler then played for the University of Nebraska Omaha for two seasons before transferring to the University of Minnesota in 2014. He was not allowed to play in the 2014–15 season due to NCAA transfer rules. He then played one season for the University of Minnesota before signing an entry-level contract with the Minnesota Wild and joining their American Hockey League (AHL) affiliate, the Iowa Wild, for the 2016–17 AHL season.

=== Professional ===
==== Minnesota Wild ====
After attending the Minnesota Wild's 2017 training camp, Seeler was reassigned to the AHL to begin the 2017–18 season. He scored his first AHL goal on January 7, 2018, against the Cleveland Monsters.

Seeler was called up to the NHL from the Iowa Wild on February 11, 2018. He made his NHL debut the next day against the New York Rangers. Seeler recorded his first NHL point on February 22, 2018, in a game against the New Jersey Devils. He assisted on Chris Stewart's goal to help the Wild win 4–2. After his first NHL fight against Luke Witkowski on March 4, 2018, Seeler missed three games due to a bicep strain. He returned to the lineup on March 13, 2018, to play in a 5–1 loss to the Colorado Avalanche. Seeler made his playoff debut during the 2018 Stanley Cup playoffs against the Winnipeg Jets. He recorded two points in five games as the Wild lost in five games to the Jets.

As a restricted free agent, Seeler agreed to a three-year, $2.175 million contract with the Wild on July 1, 2018. On November 3, after going pointless in his first 12 NHL games that season, Seeler recorded two assists and his first NHL goal in a 5–1 win over the St. Louis Blues.

==== Chicago Blackhawks ====
The Wild placed Seeler on waivers on February 3, 2020, whereupon he was claimed by the Chicago Blackhawks. As the Blackhawks were already in town to play the Wild at the Xcel Energy Center, Seeler did not immediately have to move to join his new team, although he did not play against his old team. He played in six games with Chicago, registering one assist before the regular season was indefinitely suspended due to the COVID-19 pandemic. When the NHL returned to play for the 2020 Stanley Cup playoffs, Seeler was one of 31 Blackhawks invited to play in the "bubble" in Edmonton.

After attending the Blackhawks training camp for the delayed 2020–21 season, Seeler failed to make the opening night roster and was reassigned to AHL affiliate, the Rockford IceHogs. On January 16, 2021, Seeler was placed on unconditional waivers in order to mutually terminate his contract with the Blackhawks.

After clearing waivers, Seeler looked into playing for international leagues but was shut down. He decided to step away from hockey. For the 2020-2021 season Seeler did not play and instead worked for his father's company in Shakopee, Minnesota.

==== Philadelphia Flyers ====
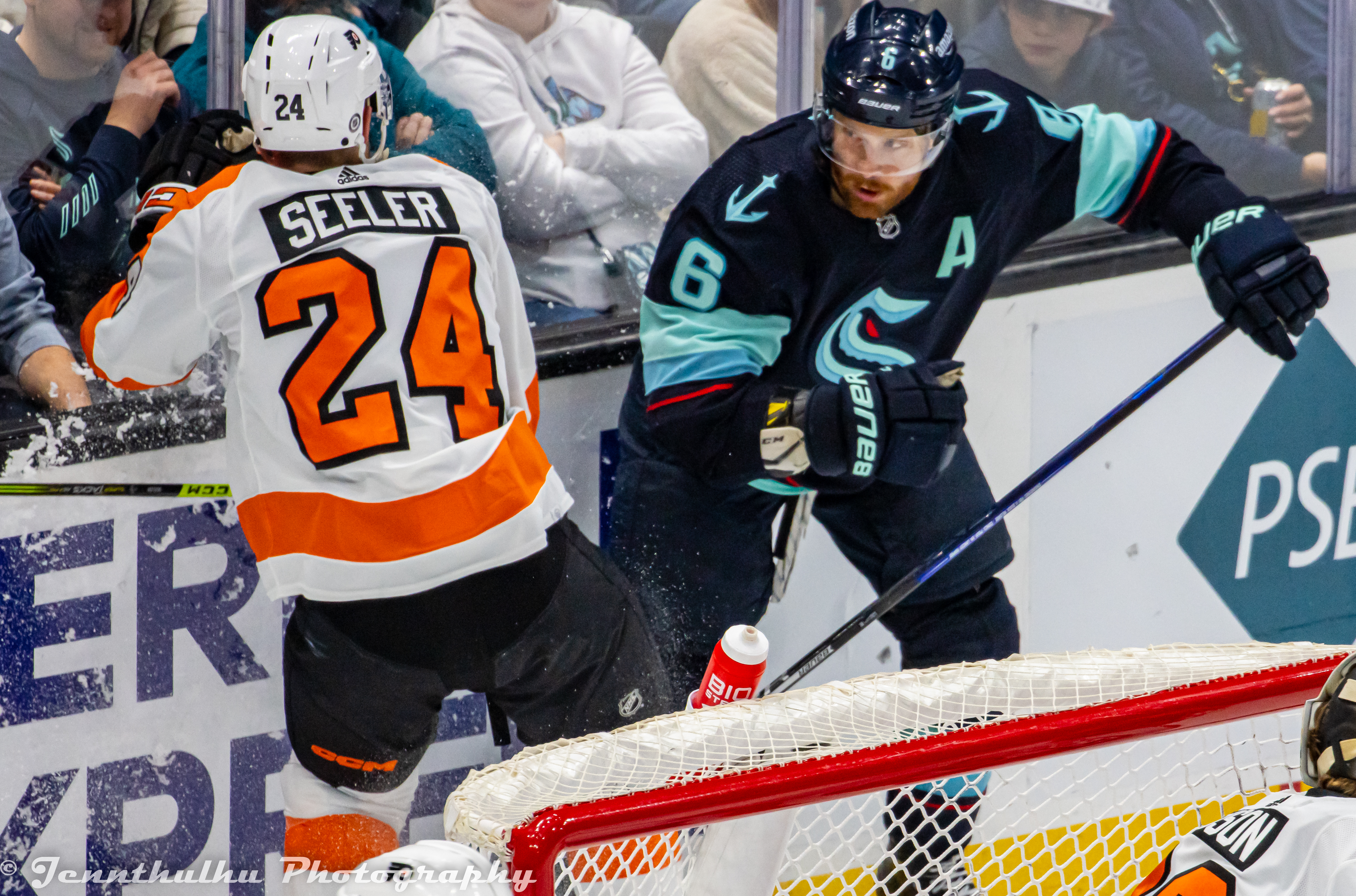
Seeler (left) and Adam Larsson during a game in 2023.

On July 28, 2021, Seeler signed a one-year, two-way contract with the Philadelphia Flyers for $750,000. Although he was expected to open with the Lehigh Valley Phantoms, a preseason injury to Rasmus Ristolainen pushed Seeler up into the Flyers' opening day lineup. He endeared himself to Flyers fans and teammates during the team's first match against the Seattle Kraken when he fought 6 feet 7 inches (2.01 m) Jamie Oleksiak to a standstill. Seeler took seven penalty minutes during the game, which Philadelphia won 6–1. However, as the Flyers held a 13–20–8 record by January 2022 and became riddled with injuries, Seeler was asked to move into a fourth-line winger position.

On May 20, 2022, Seeler opted to forgo free agency and agreed to a two-year, $1.550 million contract extension with the Flyers. On March 6, 2024, the Flyers signed him to a four-year contract extension.

== Personal life ==
His parents are Dan and Kris Seeler and he has two older sisters, Ashley and Kelly. Kelly was a member of the University of Minnesota's national championship hockey team in 2012. Nick is engaged to Haley St. Mary.

== Career statistics ==
			Regular season					Playoffs
Season	Team	League	GP	G	A	Pts	PIM	GP	G	A	Pts	PIM
2008–09	Eden Prairie High School	HSMN	17	0	2	2	6	6	0	0	0	2
2009–10	Eden Prairie High School	HSMN	25	3	14	17	12	3	1	3	4	0
2010–11	Eden Prairie High School	HSMN	22	7	27	34	38	6	2	7	9	10
2011–12	Muskegon Lumberjacks	USHL	32	2	13	15	32	—	—	—	—	—
2011–12	Des Moines Buccaneers	USHL	26	2	11	13	33	—	—	—	—	—
2012–13	University of Nebraska Omaha	WCHA	34	2	7	9	55	—	—	—	—	—
2013–14	University of Nebraska Omaha	NCHC	36	4	6	10	61	—	—	—	—	—
2015–16	University of Minnesota	B1G	36	0	10	10	43	—	—	—	—	—
2016–17	Iowa Wild	AHL	57	0	5	5	109	—	—	—	—	—
2017–18	Iowa Wild	AHL	49	2	10	12	74	—	—	—	—	—
2017–18	Minnesota Wild	NHL	22	0	4	4	21	5	0	2	2	7
2018–19	Minnesota Wild	NHL	71	2	5	7	64	—	—	—	—	—
2019–20	Minnesota Wild	NHL	6	0	0	0	8	—	—	—	—	—
2019–20	Iowa Wild	AHL	6	0	2	2	4	—	—	—	—	—
2019–20	Chicago Blackhawks	NHL	6	0	1	1	7	—	—	—	—	—
2021–22	Philadelphia Flyers	NHL	43	1	2	3	29	—	—	—	—	—
2022–23	Philadelphia Flyers	NHL	77	4	10	14	56	—	—	—	—	—
2023–24	Philadelphia Flyers	NHL	71	1	12	13	78	—	—	—	—	—
2024–25	Philadelphia Flyers	NHL	77	3	17	20	36	—	—	—	—	—
2025–26	Philadelphia Flyers	NHL	80	4	6	10	38	10	1	0	1	28
NHL totals			453	15	57	72	337	15	1	2	3	35

== Awards and honors ==
Award	Year	Ref
USHL
USHL All-Rookie Team	2012	
College
NCHC Academic All-Conference Team	2014	
Dr. V. George Nagobads Unsung Hero Award (Co-winner)	2016	
Academic All-Big Ten	2016	
