= Matt O'Connor (ice hockey) =

Canadian goaltender (born 1992)

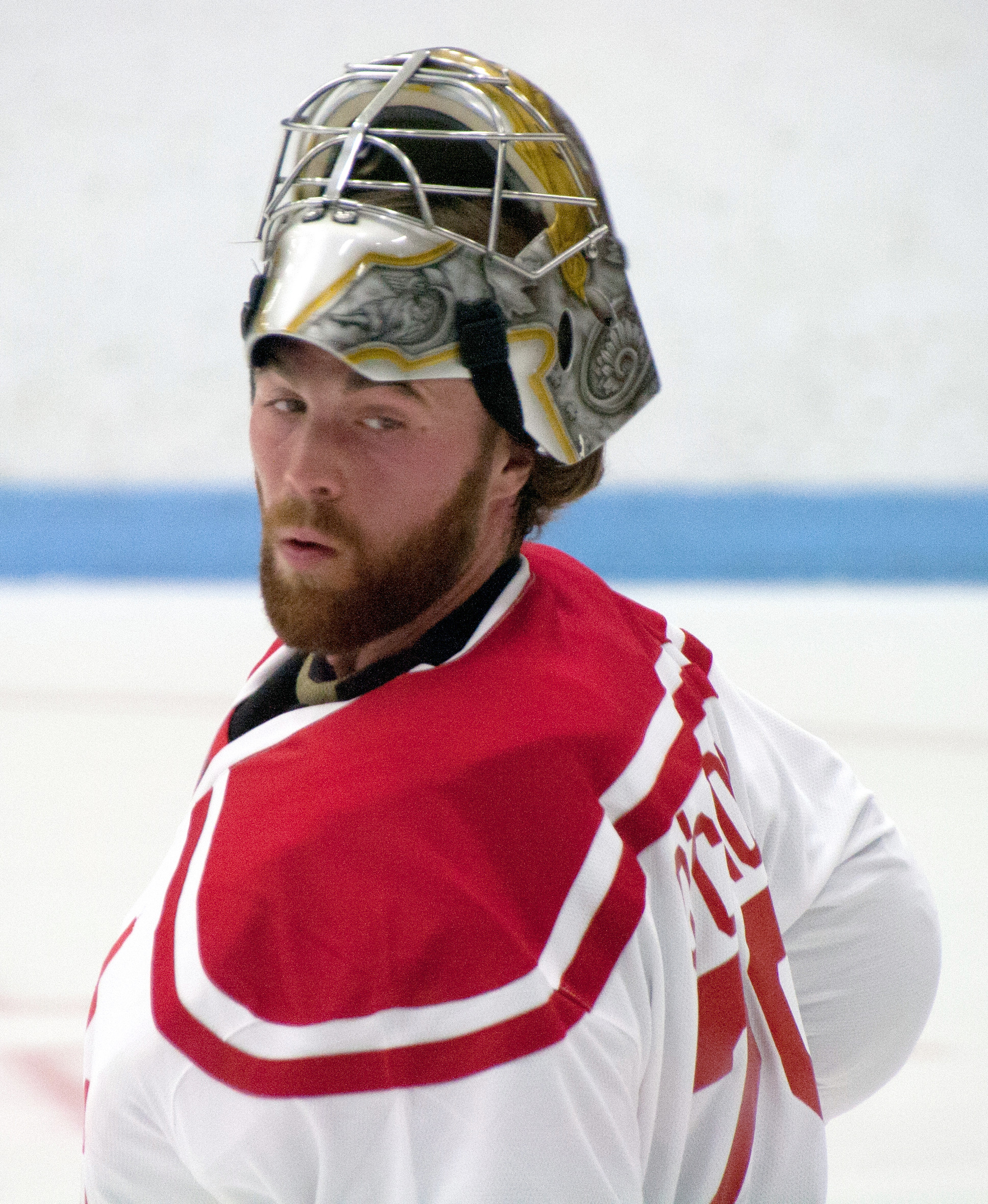
- Born: February 14, 1992 (age 34) Toronto, Ontario, Canada
- Height: 6 ft 5 in (196 cm)
- Weight: 204 lb (93 kg; 14 st 8 lb)
- Position: Goaltender
- Catches: Left
- Ligue Magnus team Former teams: Ducs d'Angers; Ottawa Senators; Binghamton Senators; Milwaukee Admirals; Wilkes-Barre/Scranton Penguins; Rødovre Mighty Bulls; HK Nitra; HSC Csíkszereda
- NHL draft: Undrafted
- Playing career: 2015–present

Matthew Harrison O'Connor (born February 14, 1992) is a Canadian professional ice hockey player who is a goaltender for Ducs d'Angers of Ligue Magnus.

O'Connor played a single game in the National Hockey League (NHL) with the Ottawa Senators during the 2015–16 season.

== Playing career ==
=== Amateur ===
O'Connor went undrafted in both OHL and NHL drafts and, after spending two seasons in the OJHL, decided to play in the United States Hockey League. After spending two seasons with the Youngstown Phantoms, O'Connor was offered a full scholarship to Boston University. The Terriers won the Hockey East championship in 2014–15 and O'Connor was named to the Hockey East Second All-Star Team.

=== Professional ===
Over three years with the Terriers, O'Connor had garnered the attention of multiple NHL teams. O'Connor chose to forego his senior year at Boston University and signed a two-year contract with the Ottawa Senators in May 2015. He was expected to start the season with the Binghamton Senators minor league team but after an injury to Ottawa goalie Andrew Hammond, O'Connor stayed with the team and made his NHL debut on October 11, 2015, in a 3-1 defeat to the Montreal Canadiens.

It was announced by the Senators that O'Connor would not receive a qualifying offer as a restricted free agent, thus making him a free agent on June 26, 2017. On July 1, 2017, O'Connor agreed to a one-year, two-way $650,000 contract with the Nashville Predators.

After spending his first four professional seasons in North America, playing extensively in the minor leagues, O'Connor embarked on a European career as a free agent, agreeing to a one-year contract with Danish club, Rødovre Mighty Bulls of the Metal Ligaen, on July 17, 2019.

== Career statistics ==
=== Regular season and playoffs ===
| | | | Regular season | | | | | | | | | Playoffs |
| Season | Team | League | GP | W | L | OTL | MIN | GA | SO | GAA | SV% | GP | W | L | MIN | GA | SO | GAA | SV% |
|---|---|---|---|---|---|---|---|---|---|---|---|---|---|---|---|---|---|---|---|
| 2008–09 | Upper Canada Hockey Club | OJHL | 27 | 3 | 19 | 1 | 1427 | 147 | 1 | 6.18 | .878 | — | — | — | — | — | — | — | — |
| 2009–10 | Upper Canada Patriots | OJHL | 23 | 7 | 12 | 2 | 1325 | 89 | 1 | 4.03 | .904 | — | — | — | — | — | — | — | — |
| 2009–10 | Burlington Cougars | OJHL | 5 | 2 | 2 | 0 | 237 | 18 | 0 | 4.55 | .895 | — | — | — | — | — | — | — | — |
| 2010–11 | Youngstown Phantoms | USHL | 29 | 10 | 16 | 2 | 1713 | 98 | 0 | 3.43 | .886 | — | — | — | — | — | — | — | — |
| 2011–12 | Youngstown Phantoms | USHL | 50 | 28 | 16 | 5 | 1713 | 146 | 1 | 3.04 | .902 | 6 | 3 | 3 | 326 | 20 | 0 | 3.68 | .859 |
| 2012–13 | Boston University | HE | 19 | 8 | 8 | 2 | 1110 | 53 | 0 | 2.86 | .910 | — | — | — | — | — | — | — | — |
| 2013–14 | Boston University | HE | 22 | 7 | 9 | 4 | 1224 | 59 | 0 | 2.89 | .920 | — | — | — | — | — | — | — | — |
| 2014–15 | Boston University | HE | 35 | 25 | 4 | 4 | 2088 | 76 | 1 | 2.18 | .927 | — | — | — | — | — | — | — | — |
| 2015–16 | Binghamton Senators | AHL | 34 | 10 | 20 | 3 | 1921 | 106 | 0 | 3.31 | .895 | — | — | — | — | — | — | — | — |
| 2015–16 | Ottawa Senators | NHL | 1 | 0 | 1 | 0 | 59 | 3 | 0 | 3.10 | .912 | — | — | — | — | — | — | — | — |
| 2016–17 | Binghamton Senators | AHL | 37 | 14 | 18 | 1 | 2064 | 111 | 0 | 3.23 | .895 | — | — | — | — | — | — | — | — |
| 2016–17 | Wichita Thunder | ECHL | 2 | 0 | 2 | 0 | 90 | 7 | 0 | 4.63 | .875 | — | — | — | — | — | — | — | — |
| 2017–18 | Milwaukee Admirals | AHL | 2 | 0 | 2 | 0 | 117 | 7 | 0 | 3.58 | .891 | — | — | — | — | — | — | — | — |
| 2017–18 | Atlanta Gladiators | ECHL | 4 | 0 | 4 | 0 | 232 | 14 | 0 | 3.62 | .894 | — | — | — | — | — | — | — | — |
| 2017–18 | Quad City Mallards | ECHL | 6 | 0 | 4 | 2 | 340 | 29 | 0 | 5.12 | .853 | — | — | — | — | — | — | — | — |
| 2017–18 | Manchester Monarchs | ECHL | 2 | 2 | 0 | 0 | 123 | 7 | 0 | 3.42 | .904 | — | — | — | — | — | — | — | — |
| 2017–18 | Wheeling Nailers | ECHL | 4 | 0 | 1 | 2 | 216 | 12 | 0 | 3.33 | .892 | — | — | — | — | — | — | — | — |
| 2018–19 | Wheeling Nailers | ECHL | 24 | 11 | 7 | 4 | 1314 | 67 | 2 | 3.06 | .905 | — | — | — | — | — | — | — | — |
| 2018–19 | Wilkes-Barre/Scranton Penguins | AHL | 2 | 1 | 0 | 0 | 80 | 3 | 0 | 2.26 | .930 | — | — | — | — | — | — | — | — |
| 2019–20 | Rødovre Mighty Bulls | DEN |
| 2020–21 | HK Nitra | Slovak | 5 | 4 | 0 | 1 | | 9 | 0 | 1.77 | .949 | 2 | 0 | 2 | | 6 | 0 | 4.41 | .864 |
| 2021–22 | HK Nitra | Slovak |
| NHL totals | | | 1 | 0 | 1 | 0 | 59 | 3 | 0 | 3.10 | .912 | — | — | — | — | — | — | — | — |
