= Andy Welinski =

American ice hockey player (born 1993)

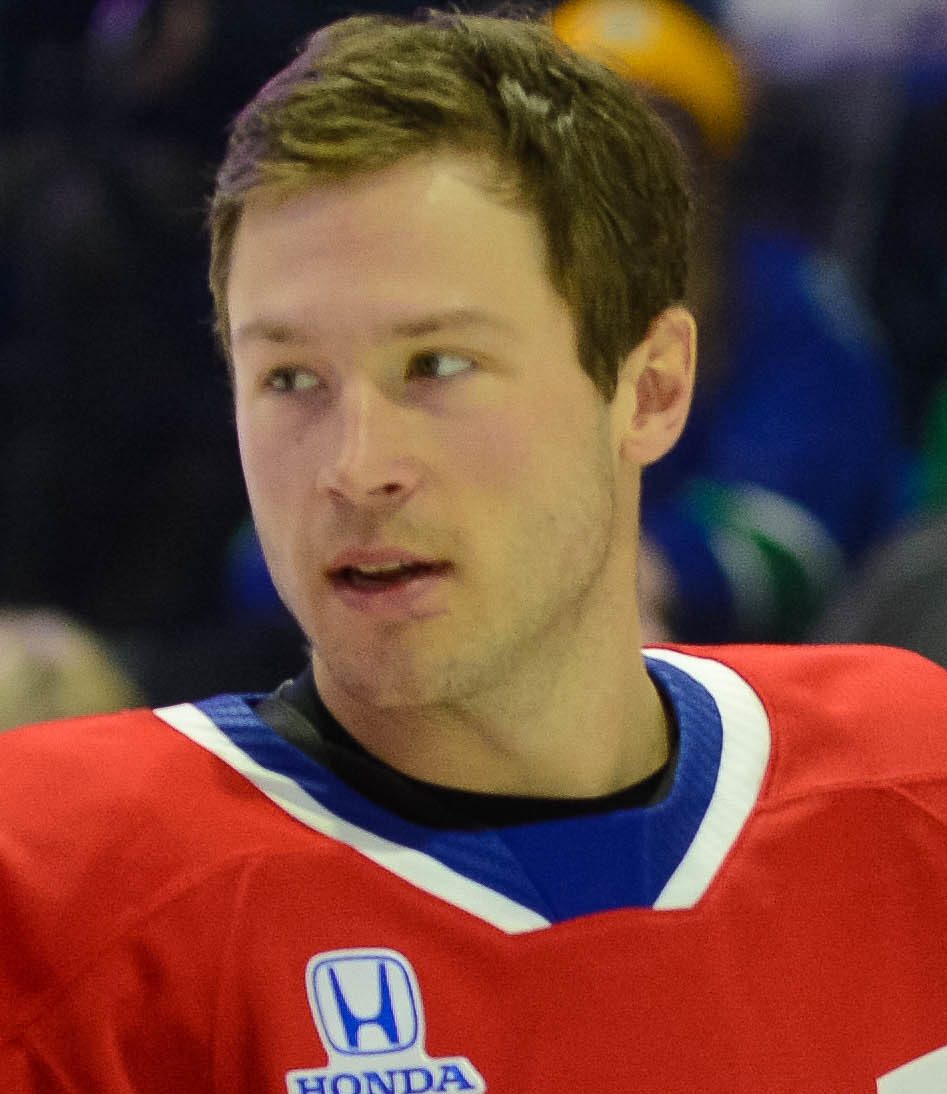
- Welinski at the 2018 AHL All-Star Game
- Born: April 27, 1993 (age 33) Duluth, Minnesota, U.S.
- Height: 6 ft 1 in (185 cm)
- Weight: 205 lb (93 kg; 14 st 9 lb)
- Position: Defense
- Shoots: Right
- team Former teams: Free agent Anaheim Ducks; Löwen Frankfurt
- NHL draft: 83rd overall, 2011; Anaheim Ducks
- Playing career: 2016–present

Andrew Philip Welinski (born April 27, 1993) is an American professional ice hockey defenseman who is currently an unrestricted free agent. He most recently played for Löwen Frankfurt of the Deutsche Eishockey Liga (DEL). He was selected by the Anaheim Ducks in the third round, 83rd overall, of the 2011 NHL entry draft.

== Playing career ==
Welinski attended Duluth East High School in his native Minnesota and then spent two years with the Green Bay Gamblers of the USHL starting 2010, capturing the Anderson Cup and the Clark Cup his second season, while receiving Defenseman of the Year and All-USHL First Team recognition. He was also presented with the Dave Tyler Junior Player of the Year Award that season.

He enrolled at the University of Minnesota Duluth in 2012 and was named to the 2012–13 Western Collegiate Hockey Association All-Rookie team. Prior to his senior season (2015–16), in which he served as team captain, Welinski made the College Hockey News Preseason All-America Team and the All-National Collegiate Hockey Conference Preseason Team. Following the season, he was named to the All-NCHC Second Team (for the second straight year). He made 154 appearances for the Bulldogs throughout his college career, amassing 24 goals and 53 assists.

On April 4, 2016, he signed a two-year entry-level contract with the Anaheim Ducks of the NHL and joined the Ducks' AHL affiliate San Diego Gulls on an amateur tryout agreement. He made his debut in the American Hockey League on April 6, 2016. He made his NHL debut on December 11, 2017, against the Carolina Hurricanes.

As a free agent from the Ducks following the 2018–19 season, Welinski left to sign a one-year $750,000 contract with the Philadelphia Flyers on July 1, 2019. After attending the Flyers training camp, Welinski was waived and assigned to AHL affiliate, the Lehigh Valley Phantoms for the 2019–20 season. He registered 8 goals and 21 points from the blueline for the Phantoms, however was unable to earn a recall to the Flyers.

At the conclusion of his contract with the Flyers, Welinski returned to the Anaheim Ducks organization as a free agent, securing a one-year, $750,000 contract on October 10, 2020. In the pandemic delayed 2020–21 season, Welinski remained on the Ducks roster as a depth defenseman, returning NHL action in featuring in 13 regular season games.

As a free agent, Welinski left the Ducks for a second time in securing a one-year, two-way contract with the Calgary Flames on July 29, 2021.

Following a lone season within the Flames organization, Welinski left as a free agent and was signed to a one-year, two-way contract with the New York Rangers on July 14, 2022. After attending the Rangers 2022 training camp, Welinski upon clearing waivers was re-assigned to play in the 2022–23 season with AHL affiliate, the Hartford Wolf Pack. Providing a veteran presence, Welinski posted four goals and 16 points through 40 games with the Wolf Pack.

On February 28, 2023, as part of a three-team deal, Welinski was traded by the New York Rangers (along with two Rangers' draft picks) to the Chicago Blackhawks in exchange for Patrick Kane and minor league defenseman Cooper Zech.

During the 2023–24 preseason, Welinski was signed to the St. Louis Blues to a PTO on September 18 but was released on September 29. Remaining as a free agent heading into the 2023–24 season, Welinski was belatedly signed to a PTO with the Iowa Wild of the AHL on October 24. Adding a veteran presence on the Blueline for Iowa, Welinski made 27 appearances posting 3 goals and 10 points, before he concluded his try-out with the club. On March 14, 2024, he was signed to a PTO to join the Charlotte Checkers, primary affiliate to the Florida Panthers.

On September 16, 2024, Welinski signed a PTO with the New Jersey Devils. He joined AHL affiliate, the Utica Comets, on a PTO to begin the 2024–25 season, appearing in 8 games before he was released on November 26, 2024.

== International play ==
He represented the US Select Team at the 2011 World Junior A Challenge.

== Career statistics ==
			Regular season					Playoffs
Season	Team	League	GP	G	A	Pts	PIM	GP	G	A	Pts	PIM
2008–09	Duluth East High School	USHS	19	4	11	15	10	5	0	4	4	2
2009–10	Duluth East High School	USHS	19	3	12	15	16	6	2	7	9	2
2010–11	Green Bay Gamblers	USHL	51	6	8	14	14	11	2	0	2	4
2011–12	Green Bay Gamblers	USHL	54	15	22	37	37	12	2	2	4	14
2012–13	University of Minnesota Duluth	WCHA	38	4	14	18	24	—	—	—	—	—
2013–14	University of Minnesota Duluth	NCHC	36	5	14	19	51	—	—	—	—	—
2014–15	University of Minnesota Duluth	NCHC	40	9	12	21	24	—	—	—	—	—
2015–16	University of Minnesota Duluth	NCHC	40	6	13	19	45	—	—	—	—	—
2015–16	San Diego Gulls	AHL	5	0	1	1	2	8	0	2	2	4
2016–17	San Diego Gulls	AHL	63	6	23	29	16	10	0	3	3	0
2017–18	San Diego Gulls	AHL	51	10	24	34	22	—	—	—	—	—
2017–18	Anaheim Ducks	NHL	7	0	2	2	0	3	0	0	0	0
2018–19	San Diego Gulls	AHL	27	8	11	19	16	16	3	7	10	12
2018–19	Anaheim Ducks	NHL	26	1	3	4	8	—	—	—	—	—
2019–20	Lehigh Valley Phantoms	AHL	42	8	13	21	10	—	—	—	—	—
2020–21	Anaheim Ducks	NHL	13	0	0	0	0	—	—	—	—	—
2020–21	San Diego Gulls	AHL	3	0	0	0	9	—	—	—	—	—
2021–22	Stockton Heat	AHL	39	3	16	19	18	13	1	5	6	0
2022–23	Hartford Wolf Pack	AHL	40	4	12	16	12	—	—	—	—	—
2022–23	Rockford IceHogs	AHL	14	0	3	3	2	3	0	0	0	2
2023–24	Iowa Wild	AHL	27	3	7	10	6	—	—	—	—	—
2023–24	Charlotte Checkers	AHL	8	0	0	0	6	2	0	0	0	0
2024–25	Utica Comets	AHL	8	0	1	1	2	—	—	—	—	—
2024–25	Löwen Frankfurt	DEL	24	1	5	6	4	—	—	—	—	—
NHL totals			46	1	5	6	8	3	0	0	0	0

== Awards and honors ==
Award	Year
College
All-WCHA Rookie Team	2012–13
