= Austin Farley =

American professional ice hockey player

- Born: November 10, 1993 (age 32) Park Ridge, Illinois, U.S.
- Height: 5 ft 8 in (173 cm)
- Weight: 170 lb (77 kg; 12 st 2 lb)
- Position: Left wing
- Shoots: Left
- team Former teams: Free agent Lake Erie Monsters; Reading Royals; Modo Hockey; IF Björklöven; Luleå HF; Kalamazoo Wings; Kansas City Mavericks; HC Nové Zámky; Nottingham Panthers; Manchester Storm; Fife Flyers
- NHL draft: Undrafted
- Playing career: 2016–present

Austin James Farley (born November 10, 1993) is an American professional ice hockey player who is currently a free agent.

He last played for the Elite Ice Hockey League (EIHL)'s Fife Flyers. He formerly played in Europe with Luleå HF in the Swedish Hockey League (SHL), Slovak side HC Nové Zámky and English clubs Nottingham Panthers and Manchester Storm.

== Playing career ==
A Chicago native, Farley played 95 games for Fargo Force of the United States Hockey League, tallying 36 goals and 36 assists. He graduated from Fargo South High School in 2012 and subsequently enrolled at the University of Minnesota-Duluth. In September 2012, he attended the CCM/USA Hockey All-American Prospects Game in Buffalo, New York. He saw the ice in 144 games over his four-year college career, with 46 goals and 60 assists, while serving as an assistant team captain his senior season.

Fresh out of college, Farley inked an amateur tryout contract with the Lake Erie Monsters of the American Hockey League (AHL) on March 30, 2016. He made his professional debut two days later against the Chicago Wolves. After being released by the Monsters, he put pen to paper on a deal with the Reading Royals of the ECHL on April 11, 2016.

Farley decided to take his game to Sweden for the 2016–17 campaign, signing with Modo Hockey of the HockeyAllsvenskan on May 18, 2016. He parted ways with Modo on November 21, 2016, by mutual consent, after having played a total of 19 games for the club with two goals and two assists, and signed with fellow HockeyAllsvenskan outfit IF Björklöven the next day.

After two productive seasons in the Allsvenskan, Farley secured a two-year contract with top tier SHL club, Luleå HF on July 3, 2018. In his debut season in the SHL in 2018–19, Farley established a depth forward role within the club, posting 5 goals and 12 points through 30 regular season games.

During his second season with Luleå in 2019–20, Farley was unable to replicate his offensive numbers, collecting 3 goals and 5 points through 22 games before he was released for personal reasons from the remainder of his contract on January 3, 2020.

Returning to North America, Farley returned to the professional ranks, agreeing to a contract for the remainder of the 2019–20 season with the Kalamazoo Wings of the ECHL on January 15, 2020. Farley instantly made his debut with the Wings assuming a top-line scoring role, recording a goal and an assist, in a 6–3 defeat to the Florida Everblades. He posted 9 goals and 22 points in 27 games before the season was cancelled due to the COVID-19 pandemic.

In the following off-season, Farley was traded by the Wings to the Kansas City Mavericks on August 12, 2020.

== Career statistics ==
			Regular season					Playoffs
Season	Team	League	GP	G	A	Pts	PIM	GP	G	A	Pts	PIM
2010–11	Chicago Mission	T1EHL	16	10	7	17	35	—	—	—	—	—
2010–11	Fargo Force	USHL	33	7	4	11	6	5	0	1	1	2
2011–12	Fargo Force	USHL	51	28	31	59	71	6	1	0	1	4
2012–13	U. of Minnesota-Duluth	WCHA	36	16	18	34	43	—	—	—	—	—
2013–14	U. of Minnesota-Duluth	NCHC	31	7	10	17	12	—	—	—	—	—
2014–15	U. of Minnesota-Duluth	NCHC	40	8	16	24	36	—	—	—	—	—
2015–16	U. of Minnesota-Duluth	NCHC	37	15	16	31	18	—	—	—	—	—
2015–16	Lake Erie Monsters	AHL	2	0	0	0	0	—	—	—	—	—
2015–16	Reading Royals	ECHL	—	—	—	—	—	4	2	1	3	2
2016–17	Modo Hockey	Allsv	19	2	2	4	12	—	—	—	—	—
2016–17	IF Björklöven	Allsv	17	7	3	10	6	—	—	—	—	—
2017–18	IF Björklöven	Allsv	43	15	18	33	62	—	—	—	—	—
2018–19	Luleå HF	SHL	30	5	7	12	31	10	0	5	5	2
2019–20	Luleå HF	SHL	22	3	2	5	2	—	—	—	—	—
2019–20	Kalamazoo Wings	ECHL	27	9	13	22	14	—	—	—	—	—
2020–21	Kansas City Mavericks	ECHL	19	0	3	3	10	—	—	—	—	—
2021–22	HC Nové Zámky	Slovak	26	8	10	18	14	—	—	—	—	—
2022–23	HC Nové Zámky	Slovak	48	15	31	46	47	4	1	2	3	2
2023–24	HC Nové Zámky	Slovak	10	4	1	5	6	—	—	—	—	—
2023–24	Nottingham Panthers	EIHL	11	0	2	2	0	—	—	—	—	—
2023–24	Manchester Storm	EIHL	24	4	7	11	10	2	0	0	0	0
SHL totals			52	8	9	17	33	10	0	5	5	2

== Awards and honors ==
Awards	Year
USHL
USHL/NHL Top Prospects Game	2012
