= Kevin Roy =

Canadian ice hockey player (born 1993)

- Born: May 20, 1993 (age 33) Greenfield Park, Quebec, Canada
- Height: 5 ft 9 in (175 cm)
- Weight: 170 lb (77 kg; 12 st 2 lb)
- Position: Forward
- Shoots: Left
- ICEHL team Former teams: Graz99ers; Anaheim Ducks; Brynas IF; HIFK; HC TWK Innsbruck
- NHL draft: 97th overall, 2012; Anaheim Ducks
- Playing career: 2016–present

Kevin Roy (born May 20, 1993) is a Canadian professional ice hockey forward who is currently playing with Graz99ers of the ICE Hockey League (ICEHL). Roy was selected by the Anaheim Ducks in the 4th round (97th overall) of the 2012 NHL entry draft. He played with the NCAA Men's Division I Northeastern Huskies in the Hockey East conference from 2012 to 2016.

== Playing career ==
As a youth, Roy played in the 2005 Quebec International Pee-Wee Hockey Tournament with a minor ice hockey team from Saint-Laurent.

Roy attended Northeastern University, where he skated with the Northeastern Huskies men's ice hockey team since the 2012–13 season. In his freshman season Roy was honoured when he was named to the 2012–13 Hockey East All-Rookie Team. The following season he was named to the 2013–14 Hockey East Second All-Star Team, and in his junior year he was named to the 2014–15 Hockey East First All-Star Team. He scored a hat trick in his first-ever Beanpot Tournament game as a freshman in 2013. Roy's brother, Derick Roy, also played at Northeastern as a goaltender.

On April 8, 2016, the Anaheim Ducks announced Roy signed his first professional contract on a two-year entry-level contract with the team.

During the 2017–18 season, Roy was recalled from AHL affiliate, the San Diego Gulls, and made his NHL debut with the Ducks against the Vancouver Canucks on November 9, 2017, He scored his first NHL goal against the Boston Bruins on November 15, 2017.

On July 4, 2019, having left the Ducks as a free agent, Roy signed a one-year, two-way contract with the Florida Panthers. Roy began the 2019–20 season assigned to the Panthers AHL affiliate, the Springfield Thunderbirds, registering 14 points through 23 games before he was traded by the Panthers to the Pittsburgh Penguins in exchange for Ryan Haggerty on December 18, 2019. He played out the remainder of his contract to the Penguins in the AHL with the Wilkes-Barre/Scranton Penguins, scoring 10 goals and 21 points in 35 regular season games, before the season was cancelled due to the COVID-19 pandemic.

As a free agent from the Penguins, approaching the delayed 2020–21 season, Roy accepted a professional tryout invitation to attend the Tucson Roadrunners AHL training camp, on January 19, 2021. In the shortened season, Roy led the Roadrunners in scoring with 11 goals and 30 points in 35 regular season games.

On September 17, 2021, having left the Roadrunners as a free agent, Roy continued his career in the AHL in agreeing to a one-year deal with the Laval Rocket, the primary affiliate to the Montreal Canadiens.

== Career statistics ==
			Regular season					Playoffs
Season	Team	League	GP	G	A	Pts	PIM	GP	G	A	Pts	PIM
2009–10	Deerfield Academy	USHS	27	12	16	28	6	—	—	—	—	—
2010–11	Deerfield Academy	USHS	18	19	15	34	8	—	—	—	—	—
2011–12	Lincoln Stars	USHL	59	54	50	104	50	8	7	3	10	4
2012–13	Northeastern University	HE	29	17	17	34	24	—	—	—	—	—
2013–14	Northeastern University	HE	37	19	27	46	30	—	—	—	—	—
2014–15	Northeastern University	HE	35	19	25	44	28	—	—	—	—	—
2015–16	Northeastern University	HE	29	10	16	26	10	—	—	—	—	—
2015–16	San Diego Gulls	AHL	2	0	0	0	0	—	—	—	—	—
2016–17	San Diego Gulls	AHL	67	16	30	46	16	10	2	3	5	0
2017–18	San Diego Gulls	AHL	45	14	23	37	14	—	—	—	—	—
2017–18	Anaheim Ducks	NHL	25	6	1	7	6	—	—	—	—	—
2018–19	San Diego Gulls	AHL	11	1	4	5	6	8	2	1	3	0
2018–19	Anaheim Ducks	NHL	3	0	0	0	0	—	—	—	—	—
2019–20	Springfield Thunderbirds	AHL	23	4	10	14	19	—	—	—	—	—
2019–20	Wilkes-Barre/Scranton Penguins	AHL	35	10	11	21	4	—	—	—	—	—
2020–21	Tucson Roadrunners	AHL	35	11	19	30	16	1	0	0	0	0
2021–22	Laval Rocket	AHL	62	13	20	33	18	2	0	0	0	2
2022–23	Brynäs IF	SHL	6	1	0	1	2	—	—	—	—	—
2022–23	HIFK	Liiga	19	1	5	6	4	1	0	0	0	0
2023–24	HC TWK Innsbruck	ICEHL	47	25	33	58	14	2	0	2	2	0
2024–25	Graz99ers	ICEHL	48	10	29	39	6	7	2	6	8	4
2025–26	Graz99ers	ICEHL	46	13	26	39	8	12	2	12	14	2
NHL totals			28	6	1	7	6	—	—	—	—	—

== Awards and honours ==
Award	Year
USHL
Player of the Year	2011–12
College
Hockey East All-Rookie Team	2012–13
Hockey East Second-Team All-Star	2013–14
Hockey East First-Team All-Star	2014–15
NCAA (East) Second All-American Team	2014–15
