= Daniil Tarasov (ice hockey, born 1991) =

Russian ice hockey player (born 1991)

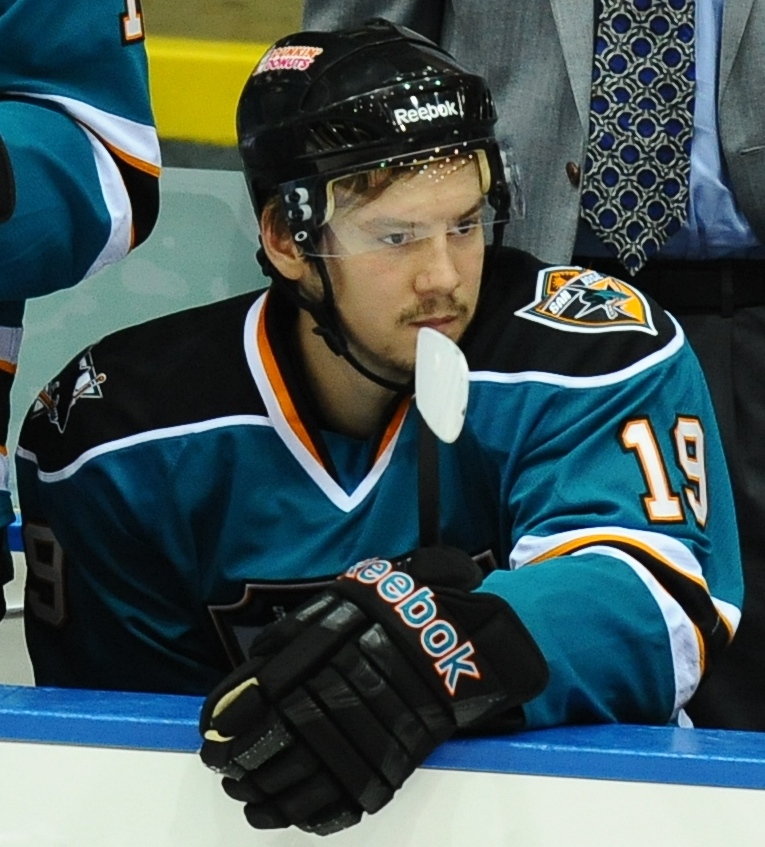
- Tarasov with the Worcester Sharks in 2013
- Born: June 20, 1991 (age 35) Moscow, Russian SFSR, Soviet Union
- Height: 5 ft 10 in (178 cm)
- Weight: 192 lb (87 kg; 13 st 10 lb)
- Position: Right wing
- Shoots: Left
- KHL team Former teams: Free agent San Jose Sharks; Dynamo Moscow; Ak Bars Kazan; Avtomobilist Yekaterinburg; Kunlun Red Star
- NHL draft: Undrafted
- Playing career: 2012–present

Daniil Vladimirovich Tarasov (Russian: Даниил Владимирович Тарасов; born June 20, 1991) is a Russian professional ice hockey player. He is currently an unrestricted free agent who most recently played with HC Kunlun Red Star of the Kontinental Hockey League (KHL).

== Playing career ==
Undrafted, on June 1, 2012, the Worcester Sharks signed Tarasov to a standard American Hockey League contract for the 2012–13 season to become the first ever Russian-born player to skate for the Worcester Sharks. During his rookie AHL campaign Tarasov scored 14 goals and 14 assists for 28 points in 43 AHL games played, and he also skated in 17 games with the San Francisco Bulls of the ECHL. On April 2, 2013, Tarasov was rewarded for his strong play when the San Jose Sharks of the National Hockey League signed Tarasov to a two-year contract.

As a restricted free agent with his NHL rights still owned by the Sharks, Tarasov opted to leave North America and sign a lucrative two-year contract to return home with Russian club, HC Dynamo Moscow of the KHL on July 17, 2015.

After his sixth season with Dynamo Moscow, Tarasov left as a free agent and signed a two-year contract with Ak Bars Kazan on 28 July 2021.

== Career statistics ==
			Regular season					Playoffs
Season	Team	League	GP	G	A	Pts	PIM	GP	G	A	Pts	PIM
2008–09	Dynamo Moscow-2	Rus.3	49	14	31	45	48	5	3	2	5	6
2009–10	Waterloo Black Hawks	USHL	2	0	0	0	0	—	—	—	—	—
2010–11	Indiana Ice	USHL	57	37	38	75	46	5	2	4	6	6
2011–12	Indiana Ice	USHL	60	47	41	88	86	6	5	5	10	8
2012–13	Worcester Sharks	AHL	43	14	14	28	20	—	—	—	—	—
2012–13	San Francisco Bulls	ECHL	17	3	11	14	5	—	—	—	—	—
2013–14	Worcester Sharks	AHL	47	17	14	31	40	—	—	—	—	—
2014–15	Worcester Sharks	AHL	54	16	17	33	27	4	0	3	3	2
2014–15	San Jose Sharks	NHL	5	0	1	1	0	—	—	—	—	—
2015–16	Dynamo Moscow	KHL	37	4	4	8	14	10	3	0	3	29
2016–17	Dynamo Moscow	KHL	34	5	2	7	20	9	1	1	2	2
2017–18	Dynamo Moscow	KHL	55	14	9	23	39	—	—	—	—	—
2018–19	Dynamo Moscow	KHL	36	12	6	18	15	9	2	2	4	4
2019–20	Dynamo Moscow	KHL	52	17	15	32	36	3	0	2	2	0
2020–21	Dynamo Moscow	KHL	56	19	16	35	26	9	0	3	3	7
2021–22	Ak Bars Kazan	KHL	41	6	7	13	8	5	0	1	1	0
2022–23	Ak Bars Kazan	KHL	11	1	0	1	8	—	—	—	—	—
2022–23	Avtomobilist Yekaterinburg	KHL	21	4	2	6	4	—	—	—	—	—
NHL totals			5	0	1	1	0	—	—	—	—	—
KHL totals			343	82	61	143	170	45	6	9	15	42

== Awards and honours ==
Award	Year
USHL Most Goals (37)	2010–11
USHL Second All-Star Team	2010–11
USHL First All-Star Team	2011–12
