= Stephon Williams =

American ice hockey player

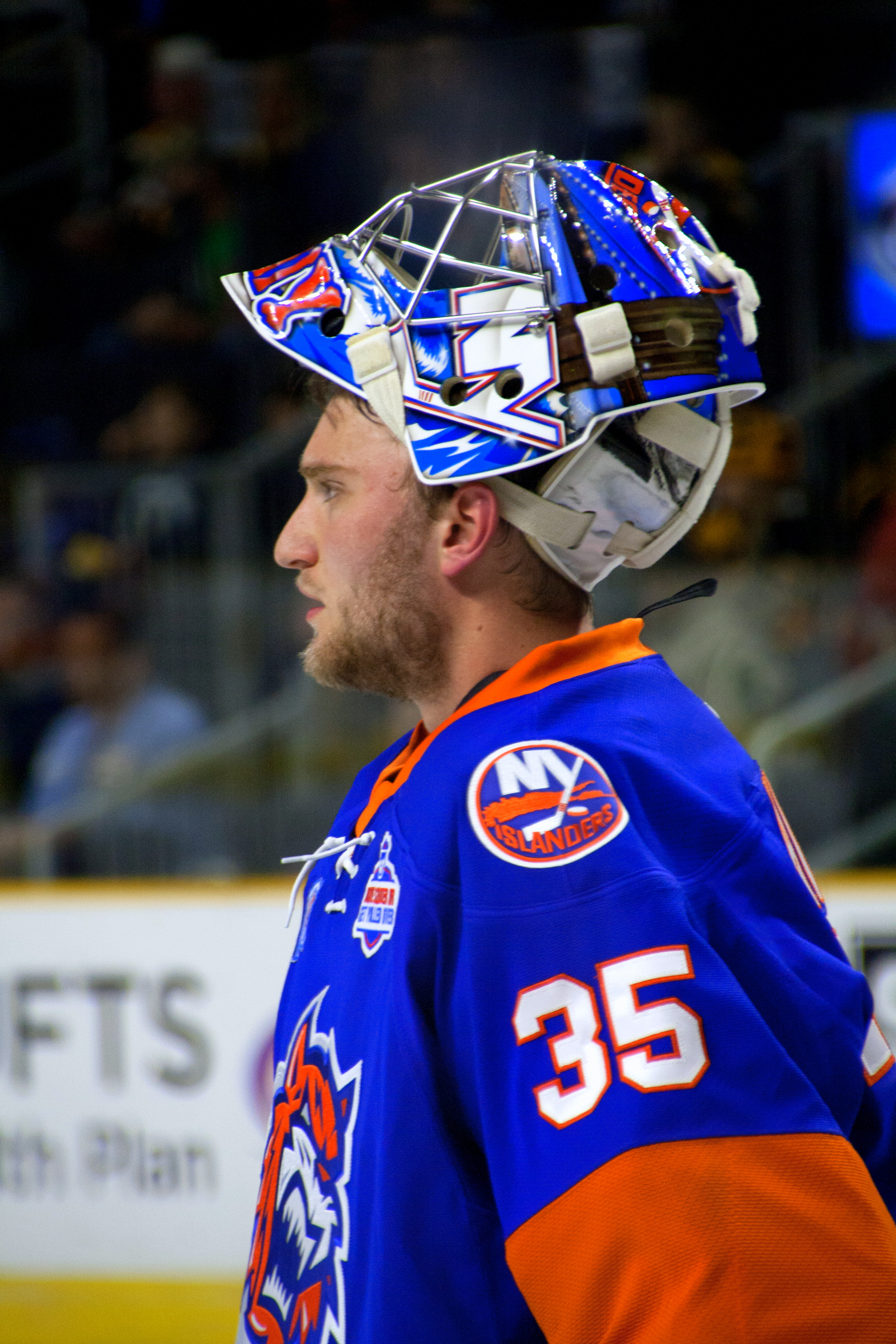
- Williams with the Bridgeport Sound Tigers in 2015
- Born: April 28, 1993 (age 33) Fairbanks, Alaska, U.S.
- Height: 6 ft 3 in (191 cm)
- Weight: 190 lb (86 kg; 13 st 8 lb)
- Position: Goaltender
- Caught: Left
- Played for: Bridgeport Sound Tigers; San Jose Barracuda; HC '05 Banská Bystrica; Bietigheim Steelers
- NHL draft: 106th overall, 2013; New York Islanders
- Playing career: 2015–2020

Stephon Williams (born April 28, 1993) is an American former professional ice hockey goaltender. He was selected by the New York Islanders in the fourth round (106th overall) of the 2013 NHL entry draft.

== Playing career ==
Williams played college hockey with the Minnesota State Mavericks in the NCAA Men's Division I WCHA conference. In his freshman year, Williams' outstanding play was rewarded with a selection to the 2012–13 All-WCHA First Team.

Upon completion of his junior campaign with the Mavericks, Williams turned professional by signing a two-year entry-level contract with the New York Islanders on April 2, 2015. He was assigned to AHL affiliate, the Bridgeport Sound Tigers to finish the 2014–15 season.

At the completion of his entry-level contract, Williams was not tendered a qualifying offer from the Islanders thus releasing him as a free agent. On September 13, 2017, Williams agreed to a one-year AHL contract with the San Jose Barracuda.

After three full professional seasons in North America, Williams opted to embark on a European career, signing a one-year deal with the Slovak club HC '05 Banská Bystrica of the Slovak Extraliga on June 26, 2018.

== Career statistics ==
			Regular season									Playoffs
Season	Team	League	GP	W	L	T/OT	MIN	GA	SO	GAA	SV%	GP	W	L	MIN	GA	SO	GAA	SV%
2010–11	Sioux Falls Stampede	USHL	35	20	7	6	2042	88	1	2.59	.909	5	4	1	298	11	0	2.21	.924
2011–12	Sioux Falls Stampede	USHL	21	6	9	2	1113	50	1	2.70	.913	—	—	—	—	—	—	—	—
2011–12	Waterloo Black Hawks	USHL	19	10	6	2	1054	49	1	2.79	.896	15	10	5	895	34	1	2.28	.921
2012–13	Minnesota State	WCHA	35	21	12	2	2043	68	4	2.00	.924	—	—	—	—	—	—	—	—
2013–14	Minnesota State	WCHA	12	5	6	0	594	32	1	3.23	.862	—	—	—	—	—	—	—	—
2014–15	Minnesota State	WCHA	35	25	6	3	1999	55	5	1.65	.925	—	—	—	—	—	—	—	—
2014–15	Bridgeport Sound Tigers	AHL	5	3	1	0	255	9	1	2.12	.936	—	—	—	—	—	—	—	—
2015–16	Bridgeport Sound Tigers	AHL	29	15	13	1	1605	74	1	2.77	.899	2	0	2	120	6	0	3.00	.920
2015–16	Missouri Mavericks	ECHL	7	2	3	2	412	20	0	2.91	.892	—	—	—	—	—	—	—	—
2016–17	Bridgeport Sound Tigers	AHL	24	6	13	1	1265	65	1	3.08	.891	—	—	—	—	—	—	—	—
2016–17	Missouri Mavericks	ECHL	8	3	4	0	424	19	0	2.69	.916	—	—	—	—	—	—	—	—
2017–18	Allen Americans	ECHL	34	9	12	3	1434	75	0	3.14	.908	—	—	—	—	—	—	—	—
2017–18	San Jose Barracuda	AHL	6	3	1	0	300	15	0	3.00	.884	1	0	0	26	1	0	2.34	.875
2018–19	HC '05 Banská Bystrica	Slovak	46	—	—	—	2493	91	2	2.19	.918	16	12	4	—	—	5	1.49	.948
2019–20	Bietigheim Steelers	DEL2	38	19	18	0	2095	105	5	3.01	.912	2	0	2	—	—	0	3.52	.879
AHL totals			64	27	28	2	3425	163	2	2.86	.898	3	0	2	146	7	0	2.89	.916

== Awards and honors ==
Award	Year
College
All-WCHA First Team	2012–13
All-WCHA Rookie Team	2012–13
WCHA Goaltending Champion	2014–15
All-WCHA Second Team	2014–15

Awards and achievements
Preceded by Joey LaLeggia	WCHA Rookie of the Year; 2012–13	Succeeded by Alex Globke
Preceded by Kent Patterson; Cole Huggins	WCHA Goaltending leader 2012–13; 2014–15	Succeeded by Cole Huggins; Cole Huggins
