= Zane McIntyre =

American ice hockey player

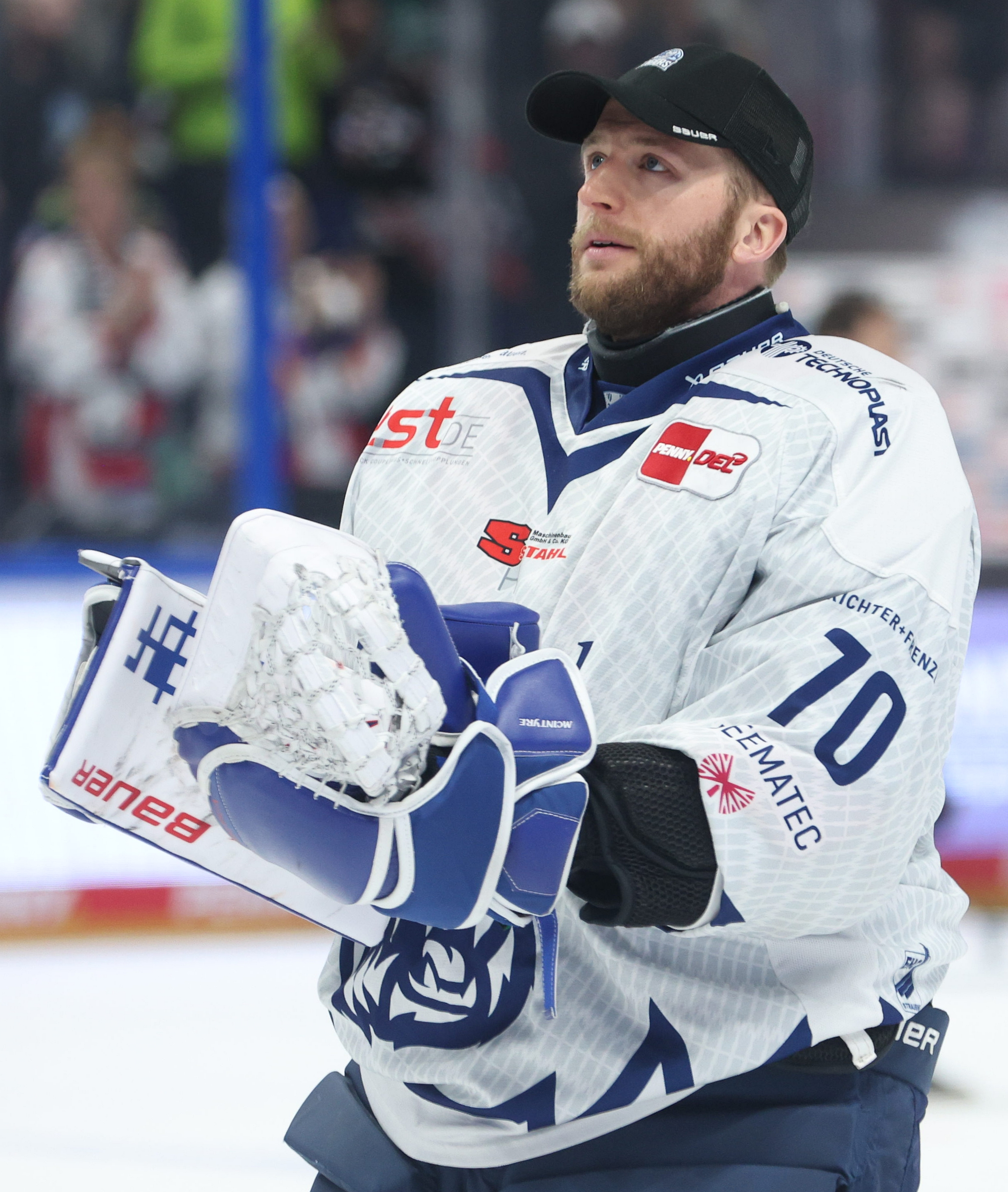
- McIntyre with the Straubing Tigers in 2025
- Born: August 20, 1992 (age 33) Grand Forks, North Dakota, U.S.
- Height: 6 ft 2 in (188 cm)
- Weight: 206 lb (93 kg; 14 st 10 lb)
- Position: Goaltender
- Catches: Left
- team Former teams: Free agent Boston Bruins; Dinamo Riga; Straubing Tigers
- NHL draft: 165th overall, 2010; Boston Bruins
- Playing career: 2015–present

Zane McIntyre (né Gothberg; born August 20, 1992) is an American professional ice hockey goaltender. McIntyre was selected by the Boston Bruins in the sixth round (165th overall) of the 2010 NHL entry draft.

== Playing career ==
McIntyre came to the University of North Dakota after playing junior hockey in the United States Hockey League (USHL) with the Fargo Force where he was named the 2011–12 USHL Goaltender of the Year. McIntyre committed to play collegiate hockey with NCAA Division I University of North Dakota men's ice hockey team which competes in the National Collegiate Hockey Conference (NCHC) conference.

After his junior season with North Dakota in 2014–15 season, McIntyre turned pro in agreeing to a two-year entry-level contract with the Boston Bruins on June 23, 2015.

Partly due to Bruins primary goaltender Tuukka Rask sustaining a groin injury at the season's start, on October 25, 2016, McIntyre made his NHL debut in a 5–0 loss to the Minnesota Wild. The following night, on October 26, he was the starting goaltender for the Bruins in a 5–2 loss to the New York Rangers. On July 14, 2017, during the off-season McIntyre, along with fellow Providence Bruins goaltender Malcolm Subban, were each re-signed by the Boston Bruins for two years, at $650,000 per year.

After spending his first four professional seasons within the Bruins organization, McIntyre left as a free agent to sign a one-year, two-way contract with the Vancouver Canucks on July 1, 2019. McIntyre was assigned by the Canucks to begin the 2019–20 season with AHL affiliate, the Utica Comets. In sharing the starting duties with prospect Michael DiPietro, McIntyre posted 11 wins 24 games. He was briefly recalled by the Canucks however did not feature in a game.

On February 24, 2020, McIntyre was traded by the Canucks at the NHL trade deadline to the New Jersey Devils in exchange for fellow goaltender Louis Domingue. He was immediately assigned to join the Binghamton Devils of the AHL.

On October 26, 2020, McIntyre left North America as a free agent and signed abroad for the first time in his professional career, agreeing to a contract with Latvian-based club, Dinamo Riga of the Kontinental Hockey League (KHL). McIntyre made most of his 6 appearances in relief with Dinamo, registering 2 losses, before he mutually terminated his contract and returned to North America. Having remained un-signed as the 2020–21 season was delayed due to the ongoing pandemic. He was signed to a professional tryout contract to join the Arizona Coyotes training camp on December 27, 2020.

Following his release by the Coyotes at the conclusion of camp, McIntyre agreed to a one-year AHL contract with the Lehigh Valley Phantoms, affiliate to the Philadelphia Flyers, on January 18, 2021.

As an un-signed free agent a month into the 2021–22 season, McIntyre signed a professional tryout contract with the Tucson Roadrunners, the AHL affiliate of the Arizona Coyotes, on November 1, 2021. He collected 2 wins in 3 appearances with the Roadrunners before he was released from his tryout after securing a one-year, two-way contract with the Minnesota Wild on January 4, 2022. He was reassigned to continue his season in the AHL with affiliate, the Iowa Wild.

Following three seasons within the Wild organization, McIntyre left as a free agent and returned abroad in agreeing to a one-year contract with the German club, Straubing Tigers of the DEL, on July 11, 2024.

== Career statistics ==
			Regular season									Playoffs
Season	Team	League	GP	W	L	OTL	MIN	GA	SO	GAA	SV%	GP	W	L	MIN	GA	SO	GAA	SV%
2010–11	Fargo Force	USHL	23	14	8	0	1,318	49	2	2.23	.908	1	0	1	55	3	0	3.25	.842
2011–12	Fargo Force	USHL	46	26	16	4	2,758	102	7	2.22	.921	6	3	3	370	11	0	1.78	.942
2012–13	U. of North Dakota	WCHA	17	9	4	3	1,000	41	0	2.46	.920	—	—	—	—	—	—	—	—
2013–14	U. of North Dakota	NCHC	33	20	10	3	1,929	64	3	1.99	.926	—	—	—	—	—	—	—	—
2014–15	U. of North Dakota	NCHC	42	29	10	3	2,493	85	1	2.05	.929	—	—	—	—	—	—	—	—
2015–16	Providence Bruins	AHL	31	14	8	7	1,772	79	0	2.68	.898	1	0	0	40	4	0	6.00	.692
2016–17	Providence Bruins	AHL	31	21	6	3	1,777	60	2	2.03	.930	16	8	7	933	40	0	2.57	.906
2016–17	Boston Bruins	NHL	8	0	4	1	333	22	0	3.97	.858	—	—	—	—	—	—	—	—
2016–17	Atlanta Gladiators	ECHL	2	0	1	1	121	4	0	1.99	.931	—	—	—	—	—	—	—	—
2017–18	Providence Bruins	AHL	47	26	15	4	2,734	115	7	2.52	.914	2	0	2	117	4	0	2.05	.895
2018–19	Providence Bruins	AHL	46	25	14	7	2,712	117	2	2.59	.898	2	0	2	116	8	0	4.14	.855
2019–20	Utica Comets	AHL	24	11	10	2	1,347	71	0	3.16	.894	—	—	—	—	—	—	—	—
2019–20	Binghamton Devils	AHL	4	4	0	0	240	3	2	0.75	.977	—	—	—	—	—	—	—	—
2020–21	Dinamo Riga	KHL	6	0	2	0	129	10	0	4.65	.796	—	—	—	—	—	—	—	—
2020–21	Lehigh Valley Phantoms	AHL	19	11	3	3	1,080	42	1	2.33	.917	—	—	—	—	—	—	—	—
2021–22	Tucson Roadrunners	AHL	3	2	1	0	176	8	0	2.73	.904	—	—	—	—	—	—	—	—
2021–22	Iowa Wild	AHL	37	19	14	1	2,176	89	2	2.45	.920	—	—	—	—	—	—	—	—
2022–23	Iowa Wild	AHL	34	16	12	5	1987	95	3	2.87	.899	—	—	—	—	—	—	—	—
2023–24	Iowa Wild	AHL	24	4	14	4	1357	77	0	3.41	.881	—	—	—	—	—	—	—	—
2024–25	Straubing Tigers	DEL	28	15	12	0	1642	73	2	2.67	.889	4	2	2	220	8	1	2.18	.893
NHL totals			8	0	4	1	333	22	0	3.97	.858	—	—	—	—	—	—	—	—

== Awards and honors ==
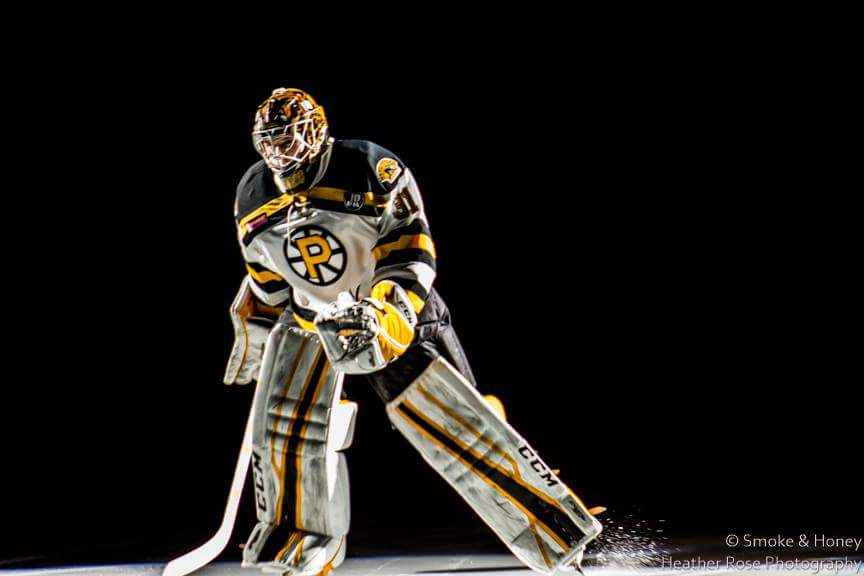
McIntyre during the 2016 Calder Cup playoffs with Providence

Award	Year
USHL
First All-Star Team	2012
Goaltender of the Year	2012
College
All-NCHC First All-Star Team	2015
NCHC Goaltender of the Year	2015
NCAA (West) Second All-American Team	2015
Mike Richter Award – NCAA Top Collegiate Goalie	2015
Hobey Baker Award Finalist	2015
AHL
Second All-Star Team	2017
Best SVS% (.930)	2017
International
Spengler Cup All-Star Team	2024

Awards and achievements
Preceded by Connor Hellebuyck	Mike Richter Award; 2014–15	Succeeded by Thatcher Demko
Preceded by Sam Brittain	NCHC Goaltender of the Year; 2014–15	Succeeded by Charlie Lindgren
