= Sean Kuraly =

American ice hockey player (born 1993)

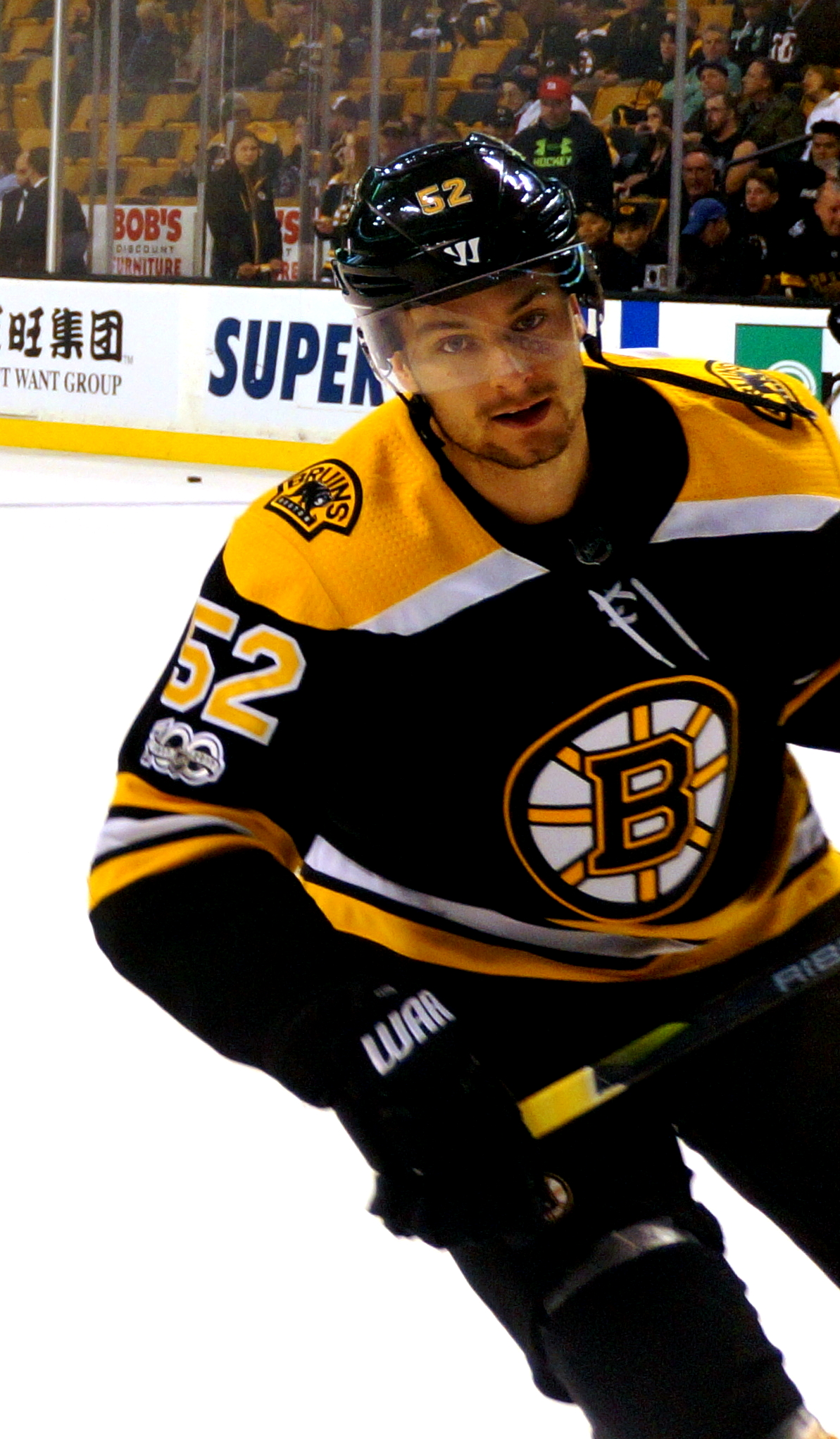
- Kuraly with the Boston Bruins in 2017
- Born: January 20, 1993 (age 33) Lewiston, New York, U.S.
- Height: 6 ft 2 in (188 cm)
- Weight: 215 lb (98 kg; 15 st 5 lb)
- Position: Forward
- Shoots: Left
- NHL team Former teams: Boston Bruins; Columbus Blue Jackets
- NHL draft: 133rd overall, 2011; San Jose Sharks
- Playing career: 2016–present

Sean Kuraly (born January 20, 1993) is an American professional ice hockey player who is a forward for the Boston Bruins of the National Hockey League (NHL). He was selected by the San Jose Sharks in the fifth round, 133rd overall, in the 2011 NHL entry draft.

== Playing career ==
As a youth, Kuraly played in the 2005 and 2006 Quebec International Pee-Wee Hockey Tournaments with minor ice hockey teams from Ohio. After early years with the Tier 1 Ohio AAA Blue Jackets, Kuraly played four games in the U.S. National Development Team Program before joining the Indiana Ice of the United States Hockey League (USHL). After his first full rookie season with the Ice, Kuraly was selected by the San Jose Sharks in the fifth round, 133rd overall, of the 2011 NHL entry draft. During the 2011–12 season, Kuraly was fourth in the league with 70 points and 32 goals in 54 regular-season games. This earned him Second-Team All-USHL honors.

After completing his USHL junior career with the Ice, Kuraly embarked on a collegiate career, in joining Miami University in Ohio.

=== Collegiate ===
In his freshman year playing for the Miami RedHawks ice hockey team, Kuraly played in 40 games and earned 12 points. He missed two games due to the 2013 World Junior Ice Hockey Championships. He helped guide the RedHawks to the 2013 CCHA Men's Ice Hockey Tournament, where he scored the game-winning goal to defeat Michigan State University in the quarterfinals. The RedHawks later lost to the University of Michigan in the semifinals. The following season, Kuraly played in 38 games and ended with a new career-high 29 points.

Upon completing his junior season with the RedHawks in 2014–15 season, Kuraly's NHL rights were traded by the Sharks (along with a first-round pick) to the Boston Bruins in exchange for goaltender Martin Jones on July 1, 2015.

In the 2015–16 season, Kuraly was unable to match the production of his previous two seasons, contributing with 6 goals and 23 points in his senior and final collegiate season. Despite this, he was named NCHC Defensive Forward of the Year and a member of the NCHC Academic All-Conference Team due to his 3.13 GPA. On June 30, 2016, Kuraly signed his first professional contract, agreeing to a two-year, entry-level deal with the Boston Bruins.

=== Professional ===
==== Boston Bruins (2016–2021) ====
After attending the Bruins' training camp, he was reassigned to make his professional debut in the 2016–17 season, with Boston's American Hockey League (AHL) affiliate, the Providence Bruins. On November 1, 2016, he received his first NHL recall on an emergency basis with the Bruins. He made his NHL debut with the Bruins, skating on the fourth line in a 4–3 shootout victory over the Tampa Bay Lightning on November 3, 2016.

Kuraly scored his first two career goals, including the double overtime winner, in a 3–2 win in Game 5 of the 2017 Eastern Conference Quarterfinals against the Ottawa Senators. This would be followed early in the 2017–18 season with his first-ever regular season Bruins goal, the winner in a 2–1 home ice defeat of the Vegas Golden Knights on November 2, 2017.

==== Columbus Blue Jackets (2021–2025) ====
Following the 2020–21 season, his fifth with the Boston Bruins, Kuraly left the organization as a free agent and was signed to a four-year, $10 million contract with hometown club, the Columbus Blue Jackets, on July 28, 2021.

On December 23, 2023, during a game against the Toronto Maple Leafs, Kuraly took a hit from Jake McCabe and was then shot with a puck in the chest. Once he reached the bench, he dropped to one knee and collapsed, prompting a stoppage of play. He was evaluated by medical personnel at the arena, and then transported to the Grant Medical Center for treatment of an abdominal injury.

==== Return to Boston (2025–present) ====
On July 1, 2025, Kuraly as a free agent signed a two-year deal worth $3.7 million for a second tenure with the Boston Bruins.

== Personal life ==
Kuraly's parents are Canadians from Toronto. His father Rick also played hockey at Miami University (OH); he is the RedHawks all-time leading goal-scorer and ranks third in career points, and was also inducted into the Miami Athletic Hall of Fame in 2014.

== Career statistics ==
=== Regular season and playoffs ===
			Regular season					Playoffs
Season	Team	League	GP	G	A	Pts	PIM	GP	G	A	Pts	PIM
2009–10	Ohio Blue Jackets 18U AAA	T1EHL	37	19	30	49	24	—	—	—	—	—
2009–10	U.S. NTDP U17	USDP	4	0	1	1	2	—	—	—	—	—
2009–10	Indiana Ice	USHL	5	1	2	3	0	—	—	—	—	—
2010–11	Indiana Ice	USHL	51	8	21	29	45	5	1	1	2	4
2011–12	Indiana Ice	USHL	54	32	38	70	48	6	3	3	6	4
2012–13	Miami University	CCHA	40	6	6	12	41	—	—	—	—	—
2013–14	Miami University	NCHC	38	12	17	29	59	—	—	—	—	—
2014–15	Miami University	NCHC	40	19	10	29	38	—	—	—	—	—
2015–16	Miami University	NCHC	36	6	17	23	39	—	—	—	—	—
2016–17	Providence Bruins	AHL	54	14	12	26	37	6	0	1	1	23
2016–17	Boston Bruins	NHL	8	0	1	1	2	4	2	0	2	4
2017–18	Boston Bruins	NHL	75	6	8	14	40	12	2	2	4	2
2018–19	Boston Bruins	NHL	71	8	13	21	38	20	4	6	10	8
2019–20	Boston Bruins	NHL	69	6	17	23	34	10	1	2	3	4
2020–21	Boston Bruins	NHL	47	4	5	9	20	11	0	0	0	6
2021–22	Columbus Blue Jackets	NHL	77	14	16	30	61	—	—	—	—	—
2022–23	Columbus Blue Jackets	NHL	71	11	9	20	68	—	—	—	—	—
2023–24	Columbus Blue Jackets	NHL	62	9	9	18	40	—	—	—	—	—
2024–25	Columbus Blue Jackets	NHL	82	6	11	17	40	—	—	—	—	—
2025–26	Boston Bruins	NHL	82	6	16	22	41	6	1	1	2	2
NHL totals			644	70	105	175	384	63	10	11	21	26

=== International ===
Year	Team	Event	Results	GP	G	A	Pts	PIM
2011	United States	IH18	5th	5	1	0	1	4
2013	United States	WJC	1st place, gold medalist(s)	7	1	2	3	2
Junior totals				12	2	2	4	6

== Awards and honors ==
Award	Year
USHL
Second All-Star Team	2012
College
NCHC Defensive Forward of the Year	2016
NCHC Academic All-Conference Team	2014, 2016

Awards and achievements
Preceded by Mark MacMillan	NCHC Defensive Forward of the Year; 2015–16	Succeeded by Dominic Toninato
