= Kevin Gravel =

American ice hockey player (born 1992)

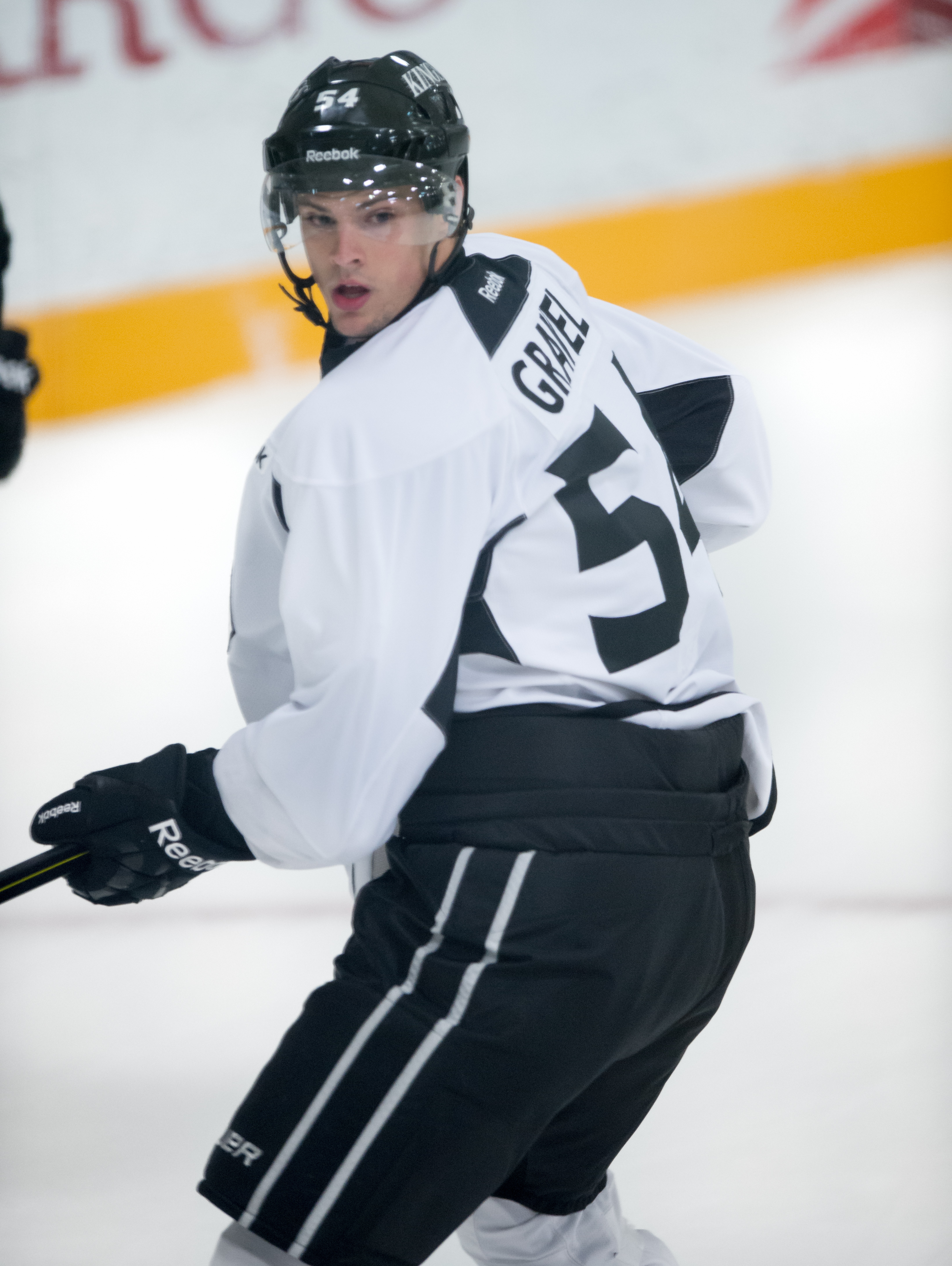
- Gravel with the Los Angeles Kings in 2013
- Born: March 6, 1992 (age 34) Kingsford, Michigan, U.S.
- Height: 6 ft 4 in (193 cm)
- Weight: 212 lb (96 kg; 15 st 2 lb)
- Position: Defence
- Shoots: Left
- AHL team Former teams: Milwaukee Admirals; Los Angeles Kings; Edmonton Oilers; Toronto Maple Leafs; Nashville Predators
- NHL draft: 148th overall, 2010; Los Angeles Kings
- Playing career: 2014–present

Kevin Gravel (born March 6, 1992) is an American professional ice hockey defenceman who is currently playing for the Milwaukee Admirals in the American Hockey League (AHL). He was selected by the Los Angeles Kings in the fifth-round (148th overall) of the 2010 NHL entry draft.

== Playing career ==
=== Amateur ===
While Tier II junior hockey with the Marquette Rangers in the North American Hockey League, Gravel committed to play for his fathers Alma mater, St. Cloud State University. Gravel then played Tier I junior hockey with the Sioux City Musketeers in the United States Hockey League for the 2009–10 season, where he was selected to that season's USHL All-Star Game and the World Junior A Challenge.

Gravel then played the next four seasons for the St. Cloud State University Huskies, where he was named to the All-WCHA Academic Team for the 2012 and 2013 seasons. He also helped the Huskies qualify for the 2013 Frozen Four and win an NCAA regional title game in 2014.

=== Professional ===
After his senior year, Gravel continued his 2013–14 season by signing an amateur try-out contract with the Manchester Monarchs of the AHL. On August 4, 2014, Gravel continued within the Los Angeles Kings organization, agreeing to a one-year AHL contract with the Monarchs, the Kings' affiliate. In his first full professional season in 2014–15, Gravel established a position on the blueline with the Monarchs, contributing to the club's first Calder Cup Championship in their last season in the AHL.

On July 2, 2015, the Los Angeles Kings signed Gravel to a two-year entry-level contract. To begin the 2015–16 season, Gravel was reassigned to new AHL affiliate, the Ontario Reign. After 42 games with the Reign, Gravel received his first NHL recall to the Kings on February 11, 2016. Gravel recorded his first NHL goal on February 23, 2017 in a game against the Boston Bruins.

During the summer before the 2017–18 season, Gravel was diagnosed with Crohn’s disease. He lost around 40 pounds, was hospitalized, and missed more than a month of training. On July 1, 2018, Gravel signed as a free agent to a one-year, two-way contract with the Edmonton Oilers. After attending the Oilers 2018 training camp, Gravel began the 2018–19 season with AHL affiliate, the Bakersfield Condors. Contributing with 1 assist in 5 games, Gravel was soon recalled by the Oilers and remained with the club for the duration of the year, recording 3 assists in 36 games.

As a free agent from the Oilers, Gravel agreed to a one-year, $700,000 contract with the Toronto Maple Leafs on July 24, 2019. He made 3 appearances with the Maple Leafs during an injury plagued 2019–20 season, featuring more prominently with AHL affiliate, the Toronto Marlies, with 3 points in 23 regular season games.

Un-signed leading into the pandemic delayed 2020–21 season, Gravel returned to former AHL club in the Bakersfield Condors after agreeing to a one-year contract on January 26, 2021.

After successful stint with the Condors, Gravel was signed as a free agent in returning to the NHL by securing a one-year, two-way contract with the Calgary Flames on July 28, 2021.

Gravel with the Milwaukee Admirals of the AHL during a January 22, 2026 team skate before their January 2026 outdoor game

Following the conclusion of his contract with the Flames, Gravel as a free agent was signed to a two-year, two-way contract with the Nashville Predators on July 13, 2022.

During the 2025–26 season, his fourth within the Predators organization, Gravel was signed to a two-year AHL contract extension to remain within the organization with the Milwaukee Admirals on February 23, 2026.

== Career statistics ==
=== Regular season and playoffs ===
			Regular season					Playoffs
Season	Team	League	GP	G	A	Pts	PIM	GP	G	A	Pts	PIM
2008–09	Marquette Rangers	NAHL	58	3	11	14	29	—	—	—	—	—
2009–10	Sioux City Musketeers	USHL	53	3	3	6	36	—	—	—	—	—
2010–11	St. Cloud State University	WCHA	36	1	5	6	4	—	—	—	—	—
2011–12	St. Cloud State University	WCHA	37	1	7	8	12	—	—	—	—	—
2012–13	St. Cloud State University	WCHA	42	1	11	12	25	—	—	—	—	—
2013–14	St. Cloud State University	NCHC	38	10	13	23	2	—	—	—	—	—
2013–14	Manchester Monarchs	AHL	5	0	0	0	2	—	—	—	—	—
2014–15	Manchester Monarchs	AHL	58	6	9	15	23	19	0	5	5	0
2015–16	Ontario Reign	AHL	55	7	13	20	30	12	1	6	7	4
2015–16	Los Angeles Kings	NHL	5	0	0	0	0	—	—	—	—	—
2016–17	Ontario Reign	AHL	6	0	2	2	0	—	—	—	—	—
2016–17	Los Angeles Kings	NHL	49	1	6	7	6	—	—	—	—	—
2017–18	Ontario Reign	AHL	25	3	8	11	17	—	—	—	—	—
2017–18	Los Angeles Kings	NHL	16	0	3	3	2	1	0	0	0	0
2018–19	Bakersfield Condors	AHL	5	0	1	1	0	—	—	—	—	—
2018–19	Edmonton Oilers	NHL	36	0	3	3	4	—	—	—	—	—
2019–20	Toronto Marlies	AHL	23	1	2	3	8	—	—	—	—	—
2019–20	Toronto Maple Leafs	NHL	3	0	0	0	0	—	—	—	—	—
2020–21	Bakersfield Condors	AHL	37	1	7	8	17	6	0	2	2	0
2021–22	Stockton Heat	AHL	59	3	11	14	11	13	0	3	3	6
2022–23	Milwaukee Admirals	AHL	49	2	11	13	16	12	1	2	3	2
2022–23	Nashville Predators	NHL	23	0	1	1	4	—	—	—	—	—
2023–24	Milwaukee Admirals	AHL	63	1	9	10	18	14	0	4	4	2
2024–25	Milwaukee Admirals	AHL	61	5	15	20	29	10	0	1	1	0
2024–25	Nashville Predators	NHL	6	0	1	1	0	—	—	—	—	—
2025–26	Milwaukee Admirals	AHL	67	2	9	11	41	3	1	1	2	0
2025–26	Nashville Predators	NHL	1	0	0	0	0	—	—	—	—	—
NHL totals			139	1	14	15	16	1	0	0	0	0

=== International ===
Year	Team	Event	Result	GP	G	A	Pts	PIM
2012	United States	WJC	7th	6	1	0	1	0
Junior totals				6	1	0	1	0

== Awards and honors ==
Award	Year
USHL
All-Star Game	2009–10
College
WCHA All-Academic Team	2011–12, 2012–13
AHL
Calder Cup	2015
