= 2009–10 USHL season =

2009-10 USHL season
- League: United States Hockey League
- Sport: Ice hockey
- Duration: October 2, 2009 – May 12, 2010
- Games: 60
- Teams: 14

Draft
- Top draft pick: Justin DeMartino
- Picked by: Tri-City Storm

Regular season
- Anderson Cup: Green Bay Gamblers
- Season MVP: Matt White (Omaha Lancers)
- Top scorer: Jaden Schwartz (Tri-City Storm)

Clark Cup Playoffs
- Clark Cup Playoffs MVP: Anders Lee (Gamblers)
- Finals champions: Green Bay Gamblers
- Runners-up: Fargo Force

USHL seasons
- 2008–09 2010–11

The 2009–10 USHL season is the 31st season of the United States Hockey League as an all-junior league. The regular season began on October 2, 2009, and concluded on April 3, 2010, with the regular season champion winning the Anderson Cup. The 2009–10 USHL season was the first to include both the Youngstown Phantoms and the US Nation Team Development Program, both of whom left the North American Hockey League. As a result of two new teams being added to the East Division, the Des Moines Buccaneers were moved to the West Division.

The Clark Cup playoffs featured the top four teams from each division competing for the league title.

== Regular season ==
Final Standings

Note: GP = Games played; W = Wins; L = Losses; OTL = Overtime losses; SL = Shootout losses; GF = Goals for; GA = Goals against; PTS = Points; x = clinched playoff berth; y = clinched division title; z = clinched league title

=== East Division ===
Team	GP	W	L	OTL	PTS	GF	GA
zGreen Bay Gamblers	60	45	10	5	95	212	140
xCedar Rapids RoughRiders	60	38	19	3	79	214	154
xIndiana Ice	60	33	24	3	69	199	187
xWaterloo Black Hawks	60	31	27	2	64	227	221
Chicago Steel	60	24	30	6	54	178	212
US NTDP	60	25	31	4	54	198	215
Youngstown Phantoms	60	20	36	4	44	170	247

=== West Division ===
Team	GP	W	L	OTL	PTS	GF	GA
yOmaha Lancers	60	42	12	6	90	238	146
xFargo Force	60	37	17	6	80	227	214
xSioux Falls Stampede	60	33	15	12	78	223	182
xTri-City Storm	60	29	25	6	64	172	189
Sioux City Musketeers	60	27	24	9	63	158	175
Des Moines Buccaneers	60	20	34	6	46	199	256
Lincoln Stars	60	16	36	8	40	143	220

== Players ==
=== Scoring leaders ===
Note: GP = Games played; G = Goals; A = Assists; Pts = Points; PIM = Penalty minutes

Player	Team	GP	G	A	Pts	PIM
Jaden Schwartz	Tri-City Storm	60	33	50	83	18
Matt White	Omaha Lancers	57	35	47	82	53
J. T. Brown	Waterloo Black Hawks	60	34	43	77	64
Michael Voran	Sioux Falls Stampede	60	23	51	74	90
Erik Haula	Omaha Lancers	56	28	44	72	59
T.J. Tynan	Des Moines Buccaneers	60	17	55	72	55
Matt Lindblad	Sioux Falls Stampede	57	24	46	70	20
Brock Montpetit	Sioux Falls Stampede	55	28	41	69	94
Tyler Barnes	Waterloo Black Hawks	60	35	33	68	27
Anders Lee	Green Bay Gamblers	59	35	31	66	54
Matt Leitner	Fargo Force	54	25	41	66	112

=== Leading goaltenders ===
Note: GP = Games played; Mins = Minutes played; W = Wins; L = Losses: OTL = Overtime losses; GA = Goals Allowed; SO = Shutouts; SV% = Save percentage; GAA = Goals against average

Player	Team	GP	Mins	W	L	OTL	GA	SO	SV%	GAA
Steve Summerhays	Green Bay Gamblers	39	2323	30	2	3	84	2	0.914	2.17
Ryan McKay	Green Bay Gamblers	24	1339	14	8	2	49	4	0.909	2.20
Jeff Teglia	Omaha Lancers	45	2700	30	10	5	102	4	0.921	2.27
Cody Campbell	Fargo/Cedar Rapids	29	1547	17	8	1	63	2	0.904	2.44
Cab Morris	Indiana Ice	38	2107	18	13	2	90	3	0.913	2.57

== Clark Cup Playoffs ==
Quarter-finals
1	Green Bay	2	5	5	–	–
4	Waterloo	1	1	2	–	–
East Division
2	Cedar Rapids	6	5	1	3	2
3	Indiana	0	3	3	6	3
1	Omaha	7	5	5	–	–
4	Tri-City	1	4	2	–	–
West Division
2	Fargo	5	7	3	–	–
3	Sioux Falls	1	6	1	–	–

Semi-finals
1	Green Bay	1	9	4	4	–
3	Indiana	2	4	2	2	–
1	Omaha	2	2	3	6	2
2	Fargo	0	4	4	2	5

Clark Cup Championship
E	Green Bay	0	1	4	5	5
W	Fargo	2	4	3	3	3

== Quarterfinals ==
=== Eastern Division ===
==== (1) Green Bay Gamblers vs. (4) Waterloo Black Hawks ====
April 7	Green Bay Gamblers	2 – 1	Waterloo Black Hawks	Resch Center
11:07 - pp - Patrick McCadden (1)		First period	J. T. Brown (1) - 10:31
No scoring		Second period	No scoring
13:09 - pp - Nick Jensen (1)		Third period
Steve Summerhays (25 saves / 26 shots)		Goalie stats	C.J. Motte (28 saves / 30 shots)

April 9	Green Bay Gamblers	5 – 1	Waterloo Black Hawks	Resch Center
4:36 - pp - Nick Jensen (2); 19:18 - Scott Czarnowczan (1)		First period	Nick Ebert (1) - ps - 5:14
6:52 - David Gerths (1); 13:44 - Will Kessel (1)		Second period	No scoring
4:12 - Anders Lee (1)		Third period	No scoring
Steve Summerhays (23 saves / 24 shots)		Goalie stats	C.J. Motte (30 saves / 35 shots)

April 10	Waterloo Black Hawks	2 – 5	Green Bay Gamblers	Young Arena
No scoring		First period	Robert Francis (1) - 8:56
4:58 - Jamie Hill (1); 15:30 - Derek Arnold (1)		Second period	Ryan Furne (1) - 17:10
No scoring		Third period	Travis Lynch (1) - 2:27; Reed Seckel (1) - 4:27; Ryan Furne (2) - 10:53
C.J. Motte (20 saves / 25 shots)		Goalie stats	Steve Summerhays (27 saves / 29 shots)

Green Bay wins series 3 – 0

==== (2) Cedar Rapids RoughRiders vs. (3) Indiana Ice ====
April 7	Cedar Rapids RoughRiders	6 – 0	Indiana Ice	Cedar Rapids Ice Arena
4:15 - pp - Jeff Costello (1); 12:42 - pp - Mac Bennett (1); 14:18 - Jordan DiGiando (1)		First period	No scoring
13:43 - Cason Hohmann (1)		Second period	No scoring
7:09 - sh - en - Zach Lehrke (1); 16:15 - Eric Robinson (1)		Third period	No scoring
Troy Grosenick (41 saves / 41 shots)		Goalie stats	Cab Morris (13 saves / 17 shots); Casey DeSmith (6 saves / 7 shots)

April 9	Cedar Rapids RoughRiders	5 – 3	Indiana Ice	Cedar Rapids Ice Arena
18:23 - David Boehm (1)		First period	Alex Wideman (1) - 13:17
1:40 - David Boehm (2); 3:14 - Derek DeBlois (1); 10:08 - pp - Cason Hohmann (2)		Second period	No scoring
0:27 - Derek DeBlois (2)		Third period	Max Cook (1) - pp - 8:11; Shane Berschbach (1) - pp - 9:17
Troy Grosenick (31 saves / 34 shots)		Goalie stats	Cab Morris (23 saves / 27 shots)

April 10	Indiana Ice	3 – 1	Cedar Rapids RoughRiders	Pepsi Coliseum
No scoring		First period	No scoring
6:28 - Max Cook (2); 14:18 - Shane Berschbach (2)		Second period	No scoring
18:55 - en - Nic Dowd (1)		Third period	Zach Lehrke (2) - 11:36
Casey DeSmith (27 saves / 28 shots)		Goalie stats	Troy Grosenick (36 saves / 38 shots)

April 12	Indiana Ice	6 – 1	Cedar Rapids RoughRiders	Pepsi Coliseum
10:06 - Max Cook (3); 15:22 - Shane Berschbach (3)		First period	Eric Robinson (2) - 10:06
3:36 - pp - Antti Roppo (1); 13:57 - pp - Max Cook (4)		Second period	No scoring
6:36 - pp - Anthony Bitetto (1); 8:01 - Nic Dowd (2)		Third period	No scoring
Casey DeSmith (41 saves / 42 shots)		Goalie stats	Troy Grosenick (4 saves / 5 shots); Cody Campbell (18 saves / 23 shots)

April 14	Cedar Rapids RoughRiders	2 – 3	OT	Indiana Ice	Cedar Rapids Ice Arena
No scoring		First period		No scoring
Jeff Costello (2) - pp - 8:18		Second period		0:39 - Brian Ferlin (1); 5:33 - Jacob Fallon (1)
Derek DeBlois (3) - 14:52		Third period		No scoring
No scoring		First overtime period		4:09 - Anthony Bitetto (2)
Cody Campbell (31 saves / 34 shots)		Goalie stats		Casey DeSmith (37 saves / 39 shots)

Indiana wins series 3 – 2

=== Western Division ===
==== (1) Omaha Lancers vs. (4) Tri-City Storm ====
April 7	Omaha Lancers	7 – 1	Tri-City Storm	Omaha Civic Auditorium
3:03 - Nick Oddo (1); 6:49 - Nick Oddo (2)		First period	No scoring
5:49 - pp - Greg Wolfe (1); 7:35 - Troy Power (1); 13:10 - Camden Wojtala (1)		Second period	Radoslav Illo (1) - 6:56
2:19 - Matt White (1); 12:11 - Dakota Eveland (1)		Third period	No scoring
Jeff Teglia (19 saves / 20 shots)		Goalie stats	Carsen Chubak (21 saves / 26 shots); Steven Bolton (8 saves / 10 shots)

April 9	Tri-City Storm	4 – 5	OT	Omaha Lancers	Viaero Center
Kenny Brooks (1) - sh - 15:17		First period		No scoring
Jaden Schwartz (1) - 5:29; T.J. Schlueter (1) - 14:32		Second period		15:04 - Stefan Demopoulos (1)
Anthony DeCenzo (1) - 6:29		Third period		2:02 - Stefan Demopoulos (2); 6:00 - pp - Dennis Brown (1); 9:16 - pp - Dennis Brown (2)
No scoring		First overtime period		Seth Ambroz (1) - pp - 2:52
Steven Bolton (34 saves / 39 shots)		Goalie stats		Jeff Teglia (19 saves / 23 shots)

April 10	Omaha Lancers	5 – 2	Tri-City Storm	Omaha Civic Auditorium
Seth Ambroz (2) - 10:37; Nick Oddo (3) - 12:57; Nick Oddo (4) - 13:23		First period	9:37 - Jaden Schwartz (2); 17:46 - sh - Jaden Schwartz (3)
Justin Holl (1) - pp - 12:28; Matt White (2) - sh - 19:01		Second period	No scoring
No scoring		Third period	No scoring
Jeff Teglia (14 saves / 16 shots)		Goalie stats	Carsen Chubak (34 saves / 39 shots)

Omaha wins series 3 – 0

* Note: Game 1 was played at Ann Arbor Ice Cube in Ann Arbor, Michigan.

==== (2) Fargo Force vs. (3) Sioux Falls Stampede ====
April 7	Sioux Falls Stampede	1 – 5	Fargo Force	Sioux Falls Arena
No scoring		First period	13:20 - Corey Leivermann (1); 14:32 - sh - Garrett Allen (1); 18:50 - Matt Leitner (1)
No scoring		Second period	No scoring
16:50 - Jacob Johnstone (1)		Third period	7:34 - Joe Rehkamp (1); 18:43 - sh - en - Matt Leitner (2)
Clay Witt (30 saves / 34 shots)		Goalie stats	Ryan Massa (28 saves / 29 shots)

April 9	Fargo Force	7 – 6	Sioux Falls Stampede	Scheels Arena
1:37 - pp - Nate Condon (1)		First period	Josh Holmstrom (1) - pp - 19:24; Matt Bailey (1) - 19:40
6:29 - Corey Leivermann (2); 12:19 - Chase Grant (1)		Second period	Michael Voran (1) - 0:24; Matt Farris (1) - 0:44; Matt Lindblad (1) - 11:09; Michael Voran (2) - pp - 15:24
7:52 - Oleg Yevenko (1); 12:29 - Matt Leitner (3); 16:31 - pp - Corey Leivermann (3); 18:40 - Chase Grant (2)		Third period	No scoring
Ryan Massa (12 saves / 16 shots); Dayn Belfour (11 saves / 13 shots)		Goalie stats	Clay Witt (25 saves / 32 shots)

April 10	Fargo Force	3 – 1	Sioux Falls Stampede	Scheels Arena
No scoring		First period	No scoring
Nick Oliver (1) - pp - 3:54; Garrett Allen (2) - 6:00		Second period	8:55 - Matt Bailey (2)
Chase Grant (3) - en - 19:40		Third period	No scoring
Ryan Massa (32 saves / 33 shots)		Goalie stats	Clay Witt (17 saves / 19 shots)

Fargo wins series 3 – 0

== Semifinals ==
=== Eastern Division ===
==== (1) Green Bay Gamblers vs. (3) Indiana Ice ====
April 16	Green Bay Gamblers	1 – 2	Indiana Ice	Resch Center
No scoring		First period	No scoring
15:00 - Ludwig Karlsson (1)		Second period	Chris Martin (1) - 18:11
No scoring		Third period	Alex Wideman (2) - 8:57
Steve Summerhays (21 saves / 23 shots)		Goalie stats	Casey DeSmith (29 saves / 30 shots)

April 18	Green Bay Gamblers	9 – 4	Indiana Ice	Resch Center
2:42 - Anders Lee (2); 5:59 - Ryan Furne (3); 8:10 - pp - Anders Lee (3); 18:02 - Alex Kubiak (1); 18:13 - Anders Lee (4)		First period	Kevin Goumas (1) - 5:39; Bryon Paulazzo (1) - 7:03
11:56 - Ryan Furne (4)		Second period	Alexander Kuqali (1) - 5:10
2:14 - Anders Lee (5); 8:34 - pp - Reed Seckel (2); 11:41 - David Makowski (1)		Third period	Shane Berschbach (4) - 8:10
Steve Summerhays (23 saves / 27 shots)		Goalie stats	Casey DeSmith (8 saves / 13 shots); Cab Morris (15 saves / 19 shots)

April 23	Indiana Ice	2 – 4	Green Bay Gamblers	Pepsi Coliseum
No scoring		First period	Ryan Furne (5) - pp - 19:33
No scoring		Second period	No scoring
6:13 - pp - Max Cook (5); 14:46 - pp - Antti Roppo (2)		Third period	Reed Seckel (3) - 0:15; Travis Lynch (2) - sh - 18:38; Chris Crane (1) - sh - en - 19:44
Casey DeSmith (23 saves / 26 shots)		Goalie stats	Steve Summerhays (24 saves / 26 shots)

April 24	Indiana Ice	2 – 4	Green Bay Gamblers	Pepsi Coliseum
12:38 - Antti Roppo (3); 18:32 - pp - Max Cook (6)		First period	Chris Crane (2) - 6:12
No scoring		Second period	Anders Lee (6) - pp - 2:39; Reed Seckel (4) - pp - 17:35
No scoring		Third period	Anders Lee (7) - sh - en - 18:45
Casey DeSmith (30 saves / 33 shots)		Goalie stats	Steve Summerhays (23 saves / 25 shots)

Green Bay wins series 3 – 1

=== Western Division ===
==== (1) Omaha Lancers vs. (2) Fargo Force ====
April 16	Omaha Lancers	2 – 0	Fargo Force	Omaha Civic Auditorium
No scoring		First period	No scoring
No scoring		Second period	No scoring
7:11 - Matt White (3); 16:00 - Greg Wolfe (2)		Third period	No scoring
Jeff Teglia (24 saves / 24 shots)		Goalie stats	Ryan Massa (29 saves / 31 shots)

April 17	Omaha Lancers	2 – 4	Fargo Force	Omaha Civic Auditorium
No scoring		First period	No scoring
2:24 - Thomas Craig (1)		Second period	No scoring
16:03 - pp - Seth Ambroz (3)		Third period	Nate Condon (2) - pp - 2:09; Matt Leitner (4) - 7:40; Corey Leivermann (4) - 14:48; Matt Leitner (5) - en - 18:511
Jeff Teglia (24 saves / 27 shots)		Goalie stats	Ryan Massa (31 saves / 33 shots)

April 21	Fargo Force	4 – 3	Omaha Lancers	Scheels Arena
3:45 - Johnnie Searfoss (1)		First period	No scoring
3:33 - pp - Chase Grant (4)		Second period	Seth Ambroz (4) - pp - 4:31
12:31 - pp - Chase Grant (5); 18:44 - en - Chase Grant (6)		Third period	Greg Wolfe (3) - 14:43; Erik Haula (1) - 19:27
Ryan Massa (23 saves / 26 shots)		Goalie stats	Jeff Teglia (21 saves / 24 shots)

April 22	Fargo Force	2 – 6	Omaha Lancers	Scheels Arena
14:14 - Chad Demers (1)		First period	Greg Wolfe (4) - 1:05; Dakota Eveland (2) - sh - 6:33
No scoring		Second period	Troy Power (2) - 7:14; Ryan Daugherty (1) - 15:59; Matt White (4) - 18:44
6:11 - Matt Leitner (6)		Third period	Dakota Eveland (3) - en - 14:20
Ryan Massa (18 saves / 23 shots); Dayn Belfour (0 saves / 0 shots)		Goalie stats	Jeff Teglia (18 saves / 20 shots)

April 24	Omaha Lancers	2 – 5	Fargo Force	Omaha Civic Auditorium
16:15 - Erik Haula (2)		First period	Nate Condon (3) - 4:52
No scoring		Second period	J.P. Burkemper (1) - 3:37
3:18 - pp - Troy Power (3)		Third period	Chase Grant (7) - 6:08; Matt Leitner (7) - 13:12; Matt Leitner (8) - en - 19:30
Jeff Teglia (25 saves / 29 shots)		Goalie stats	Ryan Massa (27 saves / 28 shots); Dayn Belfour (0 saves / 1 shot)

Fargo wins series 3 – 2

== Clark Cup Finals ==
=== Green Bay Gamblers vs. Fargo Force ===
April 30	Green Bay Gamblers	0 – 2	Fargo Force	Resch Center
No scoring		First period	No scoring
No scoring		Second period	Garrett Allen (3) - 14:13; Colten St. Clair (1) - 15:20
No scoring		Third period	No scoring
Steve Summerhays (21 saves / 23 shots)		Goalie stats	Ryan Massa (35 saves / 35 shots)

May 1	Green Bay Gamblers	1 – 4	Fargo Force	Resch Center
No scoring		First period	Colten St. Clair (2) - 14:45
0:47 - Kevin Albers (1)		Second period	John Stampohar (1) - 6:00; Garrett Allen (4) - pp - 9:16
No scoring		Third period	Ryan Massa (1) - en - 19:00
Steve Summerhays (27 saves / 30 shots)		Goalie stats	Ryan Massa (31 saves / 32 shots)

May 7	Fargo Force	3 – 4	3OT	Green Bay Gamblers	Scheels Arena
3:21 - pp - Chase Grant (8)		First period		No scoring
5:12 - Matt Leitner (9); 9:10 - Chase Grant (9)		Second period		Anders Lee (8) - pp - 1:38; Patrick McCadden (2) - 16:30
No scoring		Third period		Anders Lee (9) - 19:11
No scoring		Third overtime period		Ryan Furne (6) - pp - 1:38
Ryan Massa (43 saves / 47 shots)		Goalie stats		Steve Summerhays (29 saves / 32 shots)

May 8	Fargo Force	3 – 5	Green Bay Gamblers	Scheels Arena
10:16 - Garrett Allen (5); 12:19 - Joe Rehkamp (2); 15:33 - Johnnie Searfoss (2)		First period	David Gerths (2) - 1:12; Reed Seckel (5) - 2:10; Robert Francis (2) - 3:31; Reed Seckel (6) - pp - 11:31
No scoring		Second period	No scoring
No scoring		Third period	David Gerths (3) - en - 18:39
Ryan Massa (23 saves / 27 shots)		Goalie stats	Steve Summerhays (18 saves / 21 shots)

May 12	Green Bay Gamblers	5 – 3	Fargo Force	Resch Center
No scoring		First period	Garrett Allen (6) - 10:19
0:37 - Robert Francis (3); 2:32 - Ryan Furne (7)		Second period	Joe Rehkamp (3) - 15:49
9:34 - pp - Anders Lee (10); 13:31 - Sean Little (1); 19:48 - en - Robert Francis (4)		Third period	Matt Leitner (10) - pp - 4:42
Steve Summerhays (19 saves / 22 shots)		Goalie stats	Ryan Massa (27 saves / 31 shots)

Green Bay wins series 3 – 2

== Playoff scoring leaders ==
Note: GP = Games played; G = Goals; A = Assists; Pts = Points; PIM = Penalty minutes

Player	Team	GP	G	A	Pts	PIM
Anders Lee	Green Bay Gamblers	12	10	12	22	13
Matt Leitner	Fargo Force	12	10	8	18	28
Chase Grant	Fargo Force	12	9	5	14	16
Ryan Furne	Green Bay Gamblers	12	7	7	14	6
Reed Seckel	Green Bay Gamblers	12	6	8	14	24
Matt White	Omaha Lancers	8	4	7	11	6
Erik Haula	Omaha Lancers	8	2	9	11	2
David Makowski	Green Bay Gamblers	12	1	10	11	29
Garrett Allen	Fargo Force	13	6	4	10	14
Greg Wolfe	Omaha Lancers	8	4	6	10	4
Robert Francis	Green Bay Gamblers	11	4	6	10	14

== Playoff leading goaltenders ==
Note: GP = Games played; Mins = Minutes played; W = Wins; L = Losses; GA = Goals Allowed; SO = Shutouts; SV% = Save percentage; GAA = Goals against average

Player	Team	GP	Mins	W	L	GA	SO	Sv%	GAA
Troy Grosenick	Cedar Rapids RoughRiders	4	192	2	1	6	1	0.949	1.88
Steve Summerhays	Green Bay Gamblers	12	758	9	3	28	0	0.909	2.22
Jeff Teglia	Omaha Lancers	8	479	5	3	19	1	0.896	2.38
Ryan Massa	Fargo Force	13	789	8	5	32	1	0.918	2.43
Casey DeSmith	Indiana Ice	8	412	4	3	17	0	0.918	2.48

== Awards ==
- Coach of the Year: Jon Cooper Green Bay Gamblers
- Curt Hammer Award: Derek Arnold Waterloo Black Hawks
- Defenseman of the Year: David Makowski Green Bay Gamblers
- Executive of the Year: Ben Robert Omaha Lancers
- Forward of the Year: Jaden Schwartz Tri-City Storm
- General Manager of the Year: Jon Cooper Green Bay Gamblers
- Goaltender of the Year: Steve Summerhays Green Bay Gamblers
- Organization of the Year: Omaha Lancers
- Player of the Year: Matt White Omaha Lancers
- Rookie of the Year: Anders Lee Green Bay Gamblers
- Scholar-Athlete of the Year: Anthony Hamburg Omaha Lancers, Matt Mahalak Youngstown Phantoms

=== First Team All-Stars ===
- Steve Summerhays (Goalie) Green Bay Gamblers
- David Makowski (Defense) Green Bay Gamblers
- Bryce Aneloski (Defense) Cedar Rapids RoughRiders
- Matt White (Forward) Omaha Lancers
- Jaden Schwartz (forward) Tri-City Storm
- Anders Lee (forward) Green Bay Gamblers

=== Second Team All-Stars ===
- Jeff Teglia (Goalie) Omaha Lancers
- Anthony Bitetto (Defense) Indiana Ice
- C.J. Ludwig (Defense) Omaha Lancers
- J.T. Brown (Forward) Waterloo Black Hawks
- Brock Montpetit (Forward) Waterloo Black Hawks
- Erik Haula (Forward) Omaha Lancers
