= Anders Lee =

American ice hockey player (born 1990)

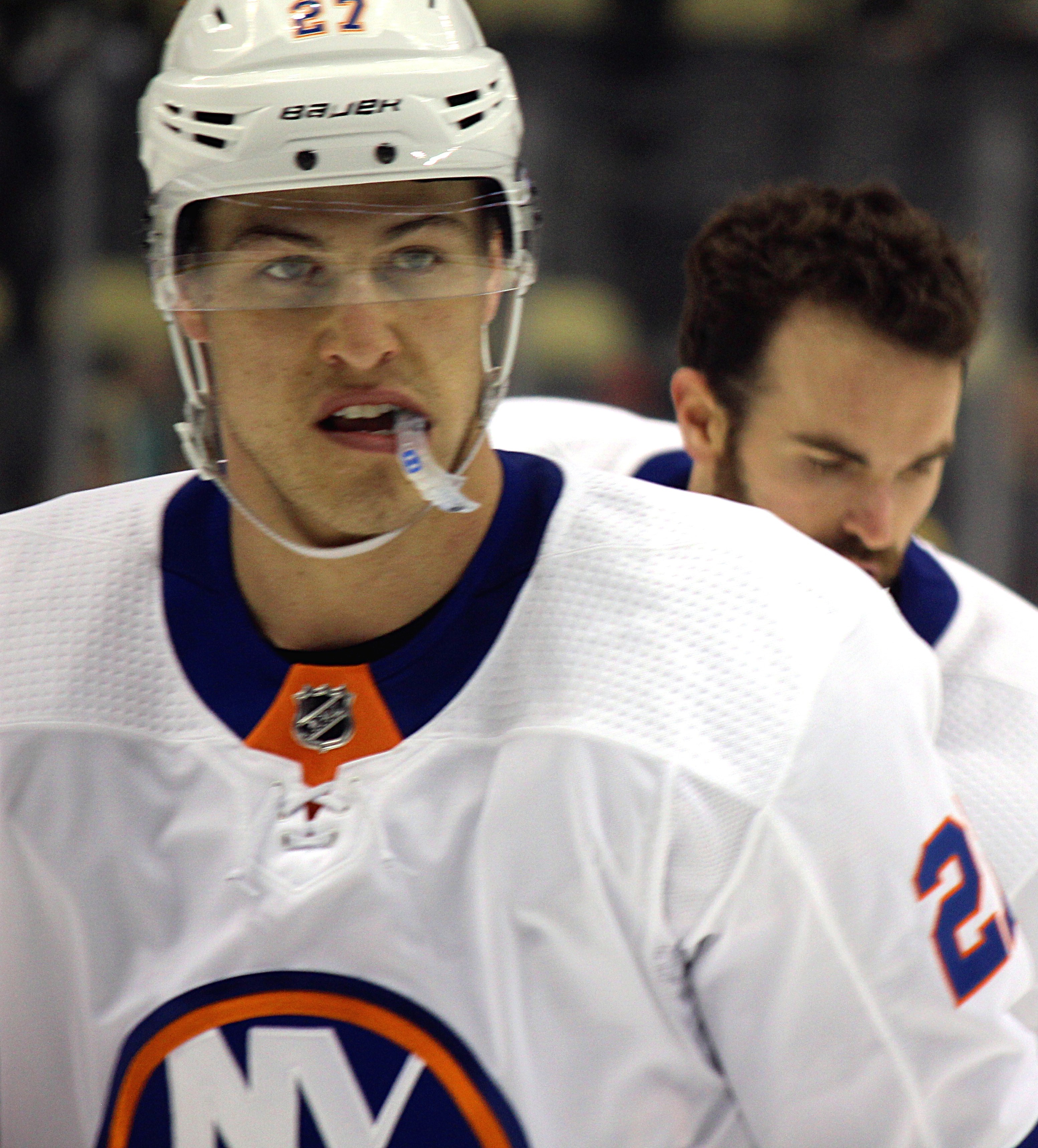
- Lee with the New York Islanders in March 2018
- Born: July 3, 1990 (age 36) Edina, Minnesota, U.S.
- Height: 6 ft 3 in (191 cm)
- Weight: 231 lb (105 kg; 16 st 7 lb)
- Position: Left wing
- Shoots: Left
- NHL team Former teams: Utah Mammoth; New York Islanders
- National team: United States
- NHL draft: 152nd overall, 2009; New York Islanders
- Playing career: 2013–present

Anders Mark Lee (born July 3, 1990) is an American professional ice hockey player who is a left winger for the Utah Mammoth of the National Hockey League (NHL). Lee attended the University of Notre Dame, where he played hockey for the Fighting Irish ice hockey team. The New York Islanders drafted him in the sixth round, 151st overall, in the 2009 NHL entry draft.

== Early life and high school ==
Lee was born in Edina, Minnesota, a suburb of Minneapolis, to Thomas (Tom) and Lisa Lee. He excelled in football, ice hockey and baseball from a young age. In 2004, he transferred to Saint Thomas Academy high school in Mendota Heights. He made the varsity ice hockey team as an eighth-grader and played alongside Jordan Schroeder. He was also part of St. Thomas Academy's Class A high school hockey tournament, winning the championship in 2006 and playing again in 2007.

In the fall of 2007, Lee transferred back to Edina High School. Although private-to-public school transfers were rare, the daily 20-mile round trip commute to St. Thomas and a desire to play with teammates he grew up with factored into his decision. In his junior year, he made an immediate impact in both football and hockey. In the fall, he won the starting quarterback position and passed for 2,049 yards and 14 touchdowns for the Edina Hornets, who finished with a 10–1 record after losing to the eventual state champion Eden Prairie in the Section 6AAAAA championship game. This was the best finish for the Edina Hornet football team in the past decade. In the winter, he transitioned to hockey, where he finished third in scoring for his team with 54 points (32 goals and 22 assists). He was selected to the Pioneer Press All-State First Team. and received an honorable mention to the AP All-State team. He helped lead the hockey team to a 26–1 regular season record and a second-place finish in the Class AA 2008 state hockey tournament. In the spring, he played varsity baseball as both a pitcher and third baseman.

As a senior, Lee had a breakout year in football. As quarterback, he passed for 2,007 yards and five touchdowns and ran for 1,105 yards and 32 touchdowns, averaging 308.7 yards of offense per game. He was selected as the 2008 Minnesota Gatorade Football Player of the Year, the Star Tribune All-Metro Player of the Year, and was a finalist for Minnesota's "Mr. Football", losing to now professional player Varmah Sonie. Lee used to hold the state record for most all-purpose yards in a game, gaining 581 yards (477 passing and 104 rushing) in 56–42 loss to Hopkins High School. Despite the individual on-field success, the Hornets went 6–4 that year and did not make the playoffs.

Lee's success in football carried over to the ice, where he had another successful season for the Hornets ice hockey team. He finished as one of the top scorers in the league during his senior year, scoring 25 goals and 59 assists in 31 games. He led the Hornets to a 24–3 regular season record and 2009 high school hockey tournament appearance. Despite being the first seed in the tournament bracket, the Hornets lost in the opening round to the eighth seed Moorhead High School. The Hornets would go on to win the consolation final, finishing fifth-place overall in the Class AA tournament. He was a 2009 finalist for the annual "Mr. Hockey" Award, losing to now-professional hockey player and former New York Islanders teammate Nick Leddy. Playing in the preseason Upper Midwest Elite League, Lee scored 12 goals with 17 assists in 18 games for Team Southwest. Many scouts regarded him as one of the best athletes in the state of Minnesota. While Lee was offered opportunities to play both football and hockey at Harvard and Minnesota, Lee ultimately committed play hockey at the University of Notre Dame.

== Playing career ==
=== Early career ===
In the 2009 NHL entry draft, Lee was selected in the sixth round, 151st overall, by the New York Islanders. Lee arguably could have gone higher in the draft, but many teams were concerned he would choose football over hockey. Many scouts were also concerned with his skating. He spent the upcoming season playing for the Green Bay Gamblers in the United States Hockey League (USHL) and was their leading scorer. He scored 35 goals with 31 assists and had a team-best +38 plus-minus rating with 54 penalties-in-minutes in 59 games and was chosen for the 2010 All-Star Game. He was named Playoff MVP after scoring 10 goals with 12 assists and finishing +10 in 12 playoff contests. He was also named "Rookie of the Year" for the season. The following season, Lee was the second-leading scorer for the Notre Dame Fighting Irish of the Central Collegiate Hockey Association (CCHA) as a freshman as the team were one of the turnaround stories in college hockey, finishing second in the CCHA after finishing ninth the previous season. He scored a team-leading 24 goals with 20 assists and his 44 points were topped only by fellow freshman T. J. Tynan, who had 54 points. After falling in the CCHA playoff semi-finals and consolation games, Notre Dame rebounded to capture the NCAA Northeast Region and advanced to the Frozen Four, losing to eventual national champion University of Minnesota Duluth in the semi-finals. In the 2011–12 season, Lee was the second-leading scorer for Notre Dame as a sophomore. He scored 17 goals with 17 assists and was minus-one with 24 penalty minutes. The Fighting Irish finished eighth in the league, reaching the tournament quarter-finals against the University of Michigan after defeating Ohio State University in an opening round series.

=== Professional ===
==== New York Islanders (2013–2026) ====
Lee concluded his collegiate career on April 1, 2013, by signing a two-year, entry-level contract with the New York Islanders. He immediately made his NHL debut the following day against the Winnipeg Jets. He scored his first career NHL goal on his first career shot in the first period of his debut to help lead the Islanders to a 5–2 win. He appeared in one more game for the Islanders that season, where he tallied his first NHL assist on the game-winning goal in a 4–2 win over the Tampa Bay Lightning. Although the Islanders were allowed to save Lee's first year of his contract for the 2013–14 season, they chose to burn the first year of his contract after he had played two games.

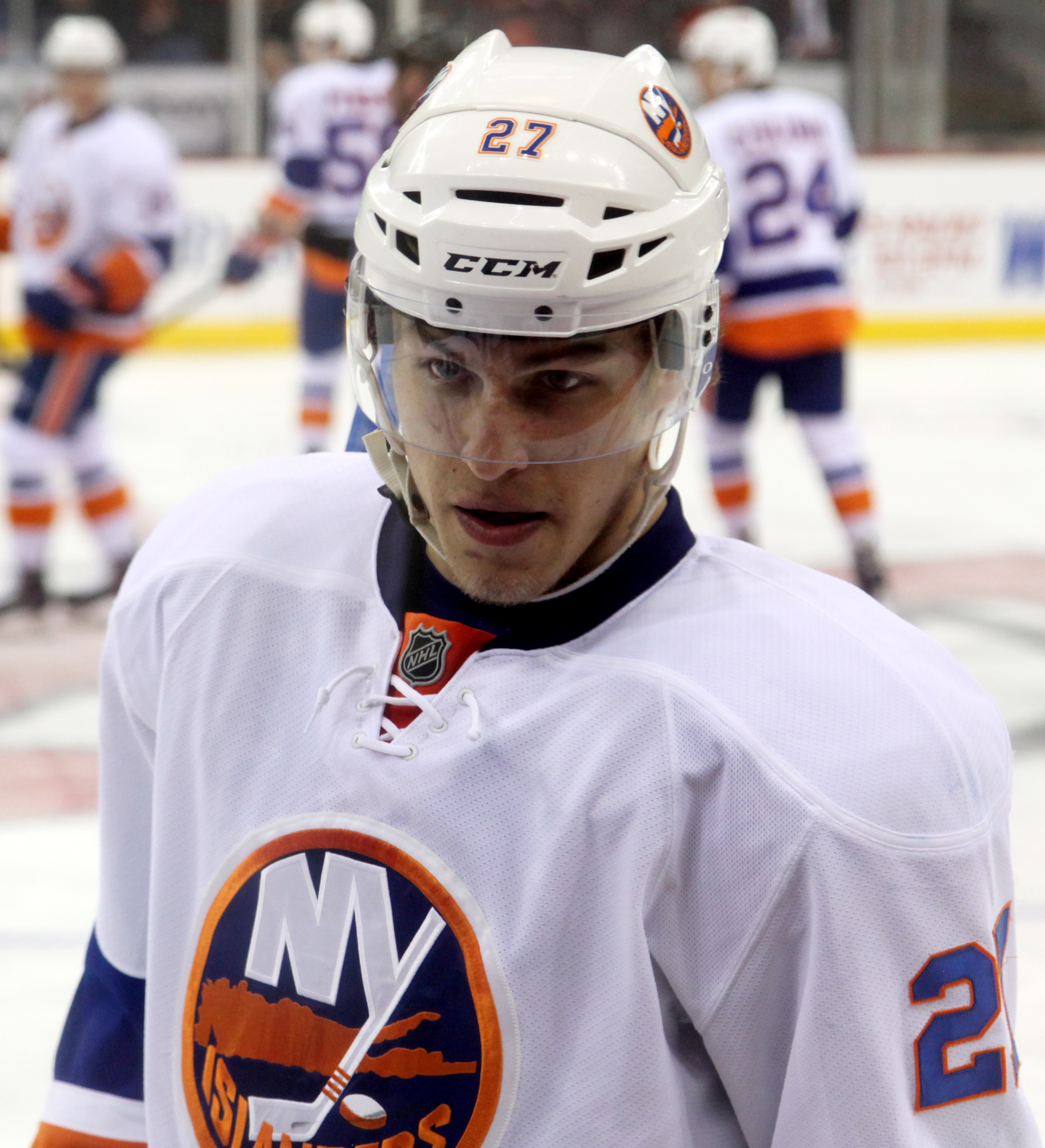
Lee with the Islanders in April 2014

Lee participated in his first Islanders training camp ahead of the 2013–14 season but was reassigned to their American Hockey League (AHL) affiliate, the Bridgeport Sound Tigers, on September 30, 2013. He immediately made an impact in the AHL, leading the team in scoring with 22 goals and 19 assists for 41 points through the first half of the season. As a result of his play, Lee was one of three Sound Tigers players recalled to the NHL level on February 24, 2014. As he continued to show his offensive output at the NHL level, Lee began to earn recognition as a possible linemate for John Tavares and Kyle Okposo.

After participating in the Islanders training camp ahead of the 2014–15 season, Lee was again reassigned to the Sound Tigers to begin the season. Head coach Jack Capuano said it was a tough decision to demote Lee because of his impressive showing at training camp but it was the result of a "numbers game." While he began the season with the Sound Tigers, Lee was quickly called up to play with the Islanders on October 22. At the time, he had accumulated three goals and two assists in five games. In his first game of the season, Lee scored the opening goal at 5:11 of the first period to lead the Islanders over the Dallas Stars. As the season progressed, Lee became a mainstay in the Islanders lineup while playing alongside Ryan Strome and Brock Nelson. While playing on the 'Kid Line,' called so given their respective ages, Lee also earned some responsibility on the team's top power play unit. After Okposo was declared out for six to eight weeks in late January, Lee replaced him on the Islander's top line with Tavares and Josh Bailey. By mid-February, Lee ranked second on the team with 19 goals and tied for second in goals scored among all league rookies. He finished the month of February leading all rookies with 15 points through 15 games and six game-winning goals. As a result, Lee was recognized with the league's Rookie of the Month honor for the month of February. Lee continued to improve as the regular season reached its end, finishing the 2014–15 season with 25 goals and 16 assists for 41 points through 76 games. His efforts helped the Islanders clinch a playoff berth in the 2015 Stanley Cup playoffs, although he was limited to five games. After playing in the first five games of the Islanders first round series against the Washington Capitals, Lee served as a healthy scratch for Game 6 and Game 7.

As a restricted free agent following the 2014–15 season, Lee signed a four-year contract extension to remain with the Islanders. When the 2015–16 season began, Lee was expected to reunite with Tavares and Strome on the Islanders top line. However, after Lee and Strome began the season off slowly, coach Jack Capuano chose to reassign Strome to the AHL and Lee to the second line with Frans Nielsen and Josh Bailey. While Lee began the season with three goals and nine points through the first 19 games, he began to bounce back while playing on the second line. The line remained together until the end of December when Lee returned to Tavares' wing in an effort to spark an increase in both of their offensive output. At the time, Lee had accumulated four goals and 15 points through 36 games, the majority of which was gathered while played on the second line. He continued to steadily improve his scoring as the season progressed before suffering a broken fibula during a game against the New York Rangers on April 7. As this was a season-ending injury, Lee finished his sophomore season with 15 goals and 36 points through 80 games. While Lee was injured, the Islanders qualified for the second round of the Stanley Cup playoffs for the first time since 1993.

After sitting out the entirety of the Islanders' playoff berth, Lee returned to the team's training camp in September healthy and eligible to play. However, both Lee and the Islanders began the season slowly. Lee scored one goal through the first 18 games of the season while the Islanders managed a losing 7–10–4 record by the end of November. In spite of the slow start, Lee experienced a career year while playing mostly on a line with team captain John Tavares and Josh Bailey. He scored a career-high 34 goals and 18 assists for 52 points through 82 games. Lee was presented the Bob Nystrom Award for 2016–17 as the Islander who best exemplifies leadership, hustle and dedication.

During the 2017–18 season, Lee again played as left wing on the first line with Bailey and Tavares. Lee was the Islanders' leading scorer with 40 goals, tied for seventh-most in the NHL during the regular season. Lee additionally had 22 assists, making a total of 62 points for the season. On April 23, 2018, he was nominated for the King Clancy Memorial Trophy.

At the beginning of the 2018–19 season, after the departure of John Tavares to the Toronto Maple Leafs, Lee was named the 15th captain of the Islanders. On July 1, 2019, Lee signed a new seven-year, $49 million contract with the Islanders (effective from the 2019–20 season to the end of the 2025–26 season) worth an average annual value of $7 million.

On March 17, 2021, the Islanders announced Lee would miss the remainder of the 2020–21 season to have surgery on a torn ACL sustained after a massive hit with New Jersey Devils forward Pavel Zacha six days earlier.

Lee achieved his first NHL hat-trick on March 10, 2022, in a 6–0 win against the Columbus Blue Jackets.

==== Utah Mammoth (2026–present) ====
On July 1, 2026, Lee signed a three-year, $16.2 million contract with the Utah Mammoth.

== Personal life ==
Lee started partnering with Jam Kancer in the Kan after seeing a video of cancer patient Fenov Pierre-Louis at a Jam Kancer in the Kan event. Since then, Lee has hosted several events for the organization, raising over $300,000 for childhood cancer, and established the Fenov Pierre-Louis Memorial Scholarship after Pierre-Louis' passing in 2018, which he awards to five high school seniors.

Lee and his wife Grace have two daughters, born in March 2020 and November 2021.

Lee's cousin is football player Ryan Connelly, who went to Wisconsin. Lee holds a degree in management consulting from Notre Dame.

== Career statistics ==
=== Regular season and playoffs ===
			Regular season					Playoffs
Season	Team	League	GP	G	A	Pts	PIM	GP	G	A	Pts	PIM
2006–07	Saint Thomas Academy	MEC	31	24	17	41	—	—	—	—	—	—
2007–08	Edina High School	LC	25	25	18	43	18	6	7	4	11	—
2008–09	Edina High School	LC	25	20	46	66	22	6	5	13	18	8
2009–10	Green Bay Gamblers	USHL	59	35	31	66	54	12	10	12	22	13
2010–11	Notre Dame Fighting Irish	CCHA	44	24	20	44	16	—	—	—	—	—
2011–12	Notre Dame Fighting Irish	CCHA	40	17	17	34	24	—	—	—	—	—
2012–13	Notre Dame Fighting Irish	CCHA	41	20	18	38	37	—	—	—	—	—
2012–13	New York Islanders	NHL	2	1	1	2	0	—	—	—	—	—
2013–14	Bridgeport Sound Tigers	AHL	54	22	19	41	83	—	—	—	—	—
2013–14	New York Islanders	NHL	22	9	5	14	14	—	—	—	—	—
2014–15	Bridgeport Sound Tigers	AHL	5	3	2	5	2	—	—	—	—	—
2014–15	New York Islanders	NHL	76	25	16	41	33	5	0	1	1	7
2015–16	New York Islanders	NHL	80	15	21	36	51	—	—	—	—	—
2016–17	New York Islanders	NHL	81	34	18	52	56	—	—	—	—	—
2017–18	New York Islanders	NHL	82	40	22	62	44	—	—	—	—	—
2018–19	New York Islanders	NHL	82	28	23	51	58	8	1	3	4	8
2019–20	New York Islanders	NHL	68	20	23	43	47	22	7	4	11	15
2020–21	New York Islanders	NHL	27	12	7	19	12	—	—	—	—	—
2021–22	New York Islanders	NHL	76	28	18	46	34	—	—	—	—	—
2022–23	New York Islanders	NHL	82	28	22	50	50	6	1	0	1	12
2023–24	New York Islanders	NHL	81	20	17	37	68	5	1	3	4	6
2024–25	New York Islanders	NHL	82	29	25	54	35	—	—	—	—	—
2025–26	New York Islanders	NHL	82	19	23	42	44	—	—	—	—	—
NHL totals			923	308	241	549	546	46	10	11	21	48

Medal record

Men's ice hockey

Representing the United States

World Championships
Bronze medal – third place	2015 Czech Republic	
Bronze medal – third place	2018 Denmark	

=== International ===
Year	Team	Event	Result	GP	G	A	Pts	PIM
2015	United States	WC	3rd place, bronze medalist(s)	10	1	4	5	2
2017	United States	WC	5th	8	5	3	8	10
2018	United States	WC	3rd place, bronze medalist(s)	10	4	0	4	4
Senior totals				28	10	7	17	16

== Awards and honors ==
Award	Year	Ref
USHL
USHL First All-Star Team	2010	
USHL Rookie of the Year	2010	
USHL Clark Cup MVP	2010	
College
All-CCHA Rookie Team	2011	
All-CCHA Second Team	2011	
All-CCHA First Team	2013	
AHCA West Second-Team All-American	2013	
NHL
King Clancy Memorial Trophy	2024	
New York Islanders
Bob Nystrom Award	2017	

Awards and achievements
Preceded by Mikael Backlund	King Clancy Memorial Trophy winner 2024	Succeeded by Aleksander Barkov
Sporting positions
Preceded by John Tavares	New York Islanders captain 2018–2026	Succeeded by Bo Horvat
