= Matt Lindblad =

American ice hockey player (born 1990)

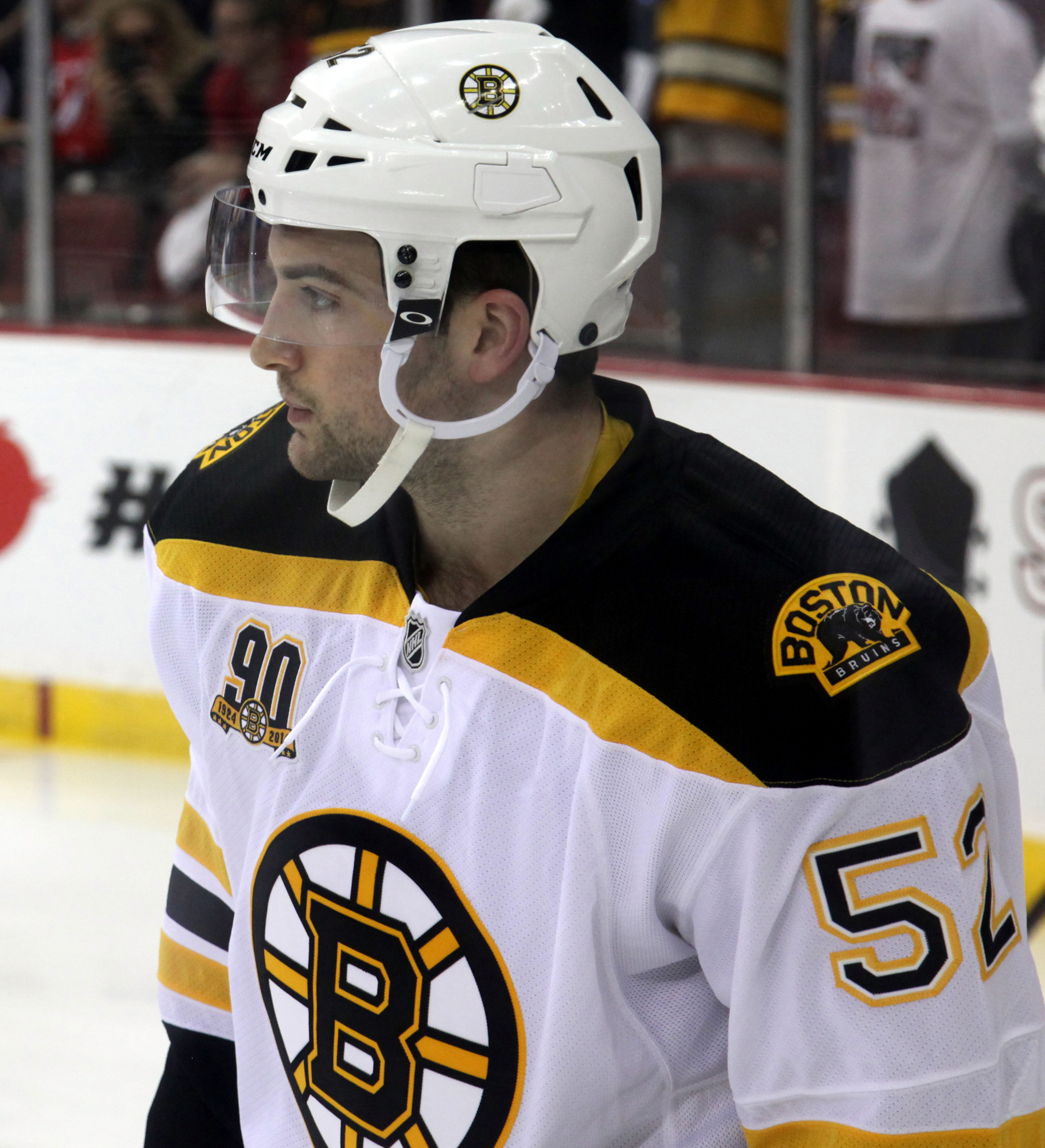
- Lindblad in 2014
- Born: March 23, 1990 (age 36) Evanston, Illinois, U.S.
- Height: 5 ft 11 in (180 cm)
- Weight: 193 lb (88 kg; 13 st 11 lb)
- Position: Forward
- Shot: Left
- Played for: Boston Bruins
- NHL draft: Undrafted
- Playing career: 2013–2016

Matthew Maurice Lindblad (born March 23, 1990) is an American professional ice hockey scout and former player. A forward, he played four games with the Boston Bruins of the National Hockey League (NHL).

== Playing career ==
Before beginning his professional career, Lindblad attended Dartmouth College, where he spent three seasons (2010–2013) playing NCAA Division I hockey with the Dartmouth Big Green. Throughout 89 games, he recorded 29 goals, 51 assists, and a total of 80 points, while accumulating just 8 penalty minutes.

On April 5, 2013, the Boston Bruins of the National Hockey League signed Lindblad as a free agent to an entry-level contract. On February 24, 2014, the Bruins recalled Lindblad from their AHL affiliate in Providence, only to be returned to the AHL without seeing NHL action. He finally made his NHL debut on March 15, 2014, playing left wing on the Bruins' fourth-line in a 5–1 win over the Carolina Hurricanes.

On July 1, 2015, Lindblad departed the Boston Bruins as a free agent and inked a one-year, two-way contract with the New York Rangers. During the 2015–16 season, he was plagued by multiple injuries, which restricted him to only eight appearances with the Rangers’ AHL affiliate, the Hartford Wolf Pack.

Following the conclusion of his contract with the Rangers, Lindblad chose to retire from professional hockey. On September 15, 2016, the Boston Bruins announced that he would be rejoining the organization in a new role as a professional scout.

== Career statistics ==
			Regular season					Playoffs
Season	Team	League	GP	G	A	Pts	PIM	GP	G	A	Pts	PIM
2008–09	Chicago Steel	USHL	51	5	20	25	17	—	—	—	—	—
2009–10	Sioux Falls Stampede	USHL	57	24	46	70	20	3	1	2	3	2
2010–11	Dartmouth College	ECAC	33	13	15	28	4	—	—	—	—	—
2011–12	Dartmouth College	ECAC	26	6	18	24	2	—	—	—	—	—
2012–13	Dartmouth College	ECAC	30	10	18	28	2	—	—	—	—	—
2012–13	Providence Bruins	AHL	4	1	4	5	0	—	—	—	—	—
2013–14	Providence Bruins	AHL	55	8	16	24	8	12	3	4	7	10
2013–14	Boston Bruins	NHL	2	0	0	0	0	—	—	—	—	—
2014–15	Providence Bruins	AHL	47	9	13	22	6	3	0	0	0	0
2014–15	Boston Bruins	NHL	2	0	0	0	0	—	—	—	—	—
2015–16	Hartford Wolf Pack	AHL	8	0	1	1	0	—	—	—	—	—
NHL totals			4	0	0	0	0	—	—	—	—	—
