= Erik Haula =

Finnish ice hockey player (born 1991)

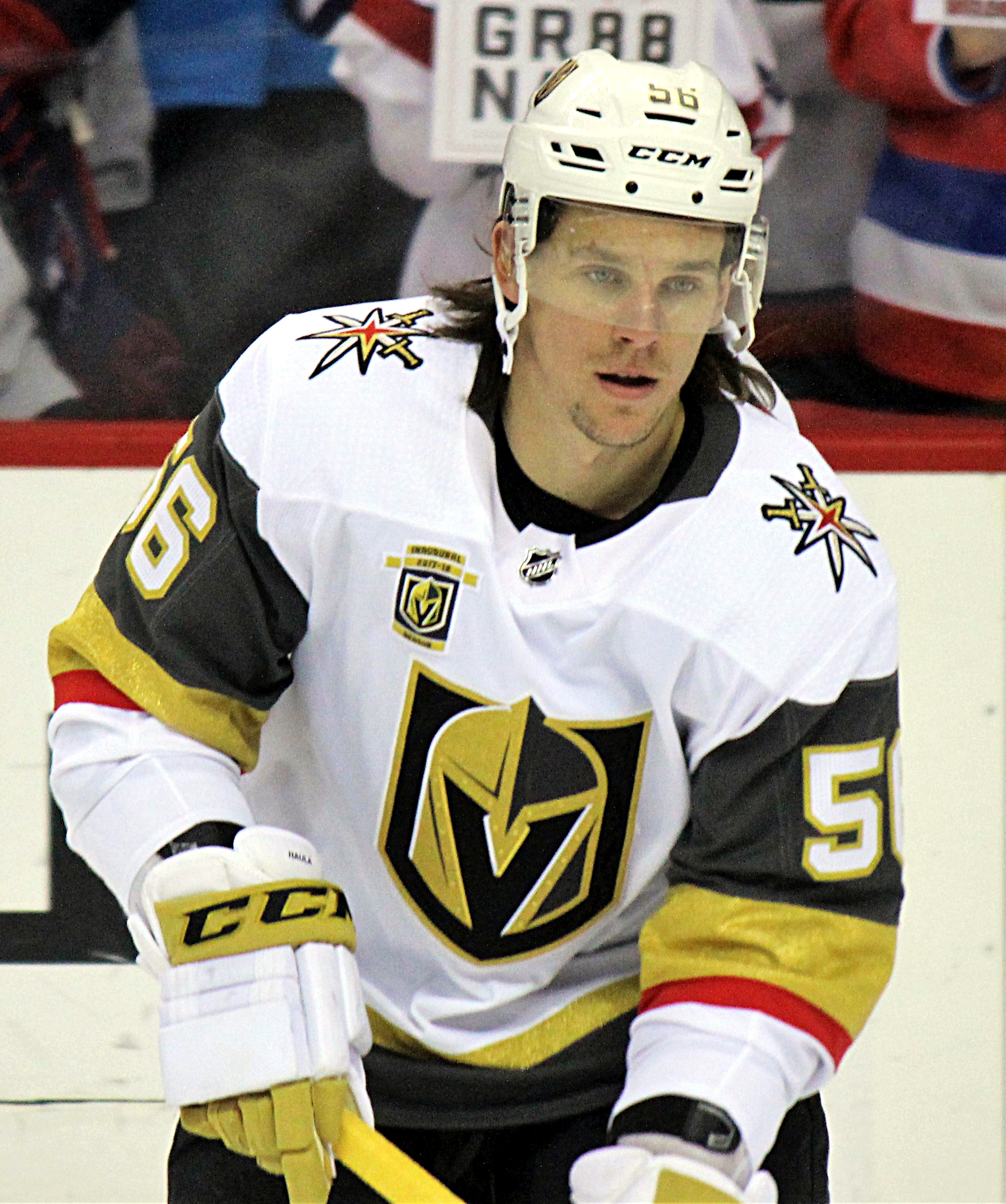
- Haula with the Vegas Golden Knights in 2018
- Born: 23 March 1991 (age 35) Pori, Finland
- Height: 6 ft 0 in (183 cm)
- Weight: 191 lb (87 kg; 13 st 9 lb)
- Position: Forward
- Shoots: Left
- NHL team Former teams: Los Angeles Kings; Minnesota Wild; Vegas Golden Knights; Carolina Hurricanes; Florida Panthers; Nashville Predators; Boston Bruins; New Jersey Devils
- National team: Finland
- NHL draft: 182nd overall, 2009; Minnesota Wild
- Playing career: 2013–present

Erik Haula (born 23 March 1991) is a Finnish professional ice hockey player who is a forward for the Los Angeles Kings of the National Hockey League (NHL). He has previously played for the Minnesota Wild, Vegas Golden Knights, Carolina Hurricanes, Florida Panthers, Nashville Predators, Boston Bruins, and New Jersey Devils. Haula was selected by the Wild in the seventh round, 182nd overall, of the 2009 NHL entry draft.

== Playing career ==
=== Junior ===
Erik Haula started playing ice hockey at his local club HC Ässät Pori. During the 2006–07 season, Haula scored 43 points in 29 games for Ässät U18. The following season he played with the Ässät U20 team in the U20 SM-sarja, scoring 22 points in 40 games. Ässät lost the finals of the U20 SM-sarja to KalPa. Haula did not get playing time in Ässät's SM-liiga lineup.

=== Amateur ===
Haula played the 2008–09 hockey season with Shattuck-Saint Mary's in Faribault, Minnesota. There he tallied 24 goals and 55 assists for 79 points in 49 games played. In March 2009, Haula committed to the University of Minnesota. He would be only the second player born outside of North America to play for the Gophers, following future Wild teammate Thomas Vanek of Austria. Three months later, on 27 June 2009, Haula was drafted by the Minnesota Wild in the seventh round, 182nd overall, at the 2009 NHL entry draft.

Before attending the University of Minnesota, however, Haula first played at the junior level in the United States Hockey League (USHL) with the Omaha Lancers for the 2009–10 season while he attended Daniel J. Gross Catholic High School. His 28 goals and 44 assists with a plus-minus rating of +36 helped lead the Lancers to the Western Division finals. In his sole USHL season, he was named to the All-Star and All-Rookie teams.

After leaving the USHL, Haula totaled 42 goals, 82 assists and 124 points in 114 games during three seasons of college ice hockey with the Gophers. He then decided to forgo his senior year and final season of eligibility to sign professionally with the Wild.

=== Professional ===
==== Minnesota Wild ====
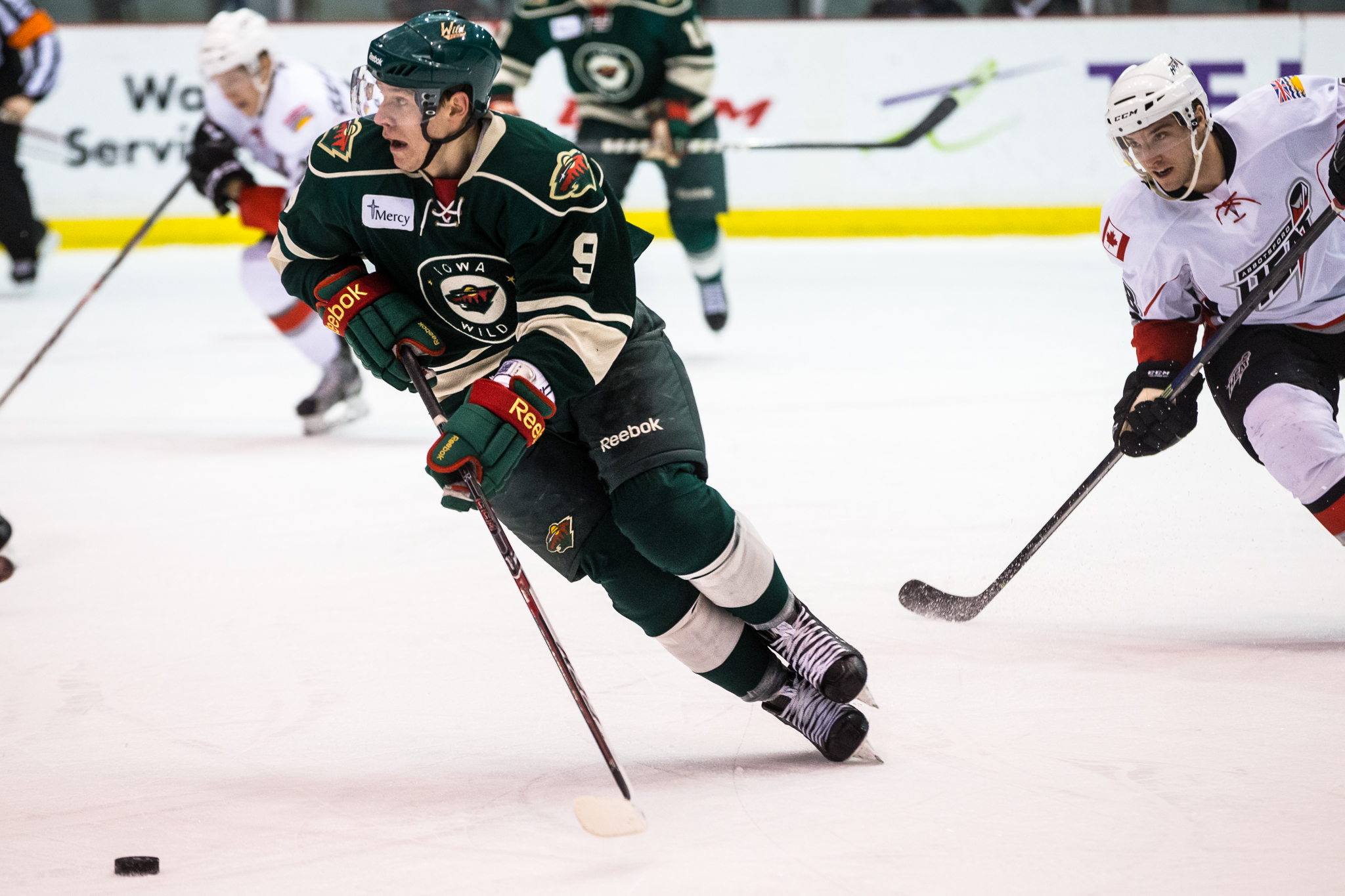
Haula with the Iowa Wild in 2013

On 7 April 2013, the Minnesota Wild signed Haula to an entry-level contract. During the 2013–14 season on 29 November 2013, the Wild recalled Haula from the Iowa Wild of the American Hockey League (AHL) to make his NHL debut, where he scored first NHL point, an assist, and he was named the game's third star in a 3–1 loss to the Colorado Avalanche. On 9 December, Haula was reassigned to Iowa. In his return to Minnesota, on 18 January 2014, Haula scored his first career NHL goal against the Dallas Stars in the first period. During 2014 Stanley Cup playoffs, he scored four goals and three assists in 13 playoff games.

Following the 2014–15 NHL season Haula became a restricted free agent under the NHL Collective Bargaining Agreement. The Minnesota Wild made him a qualifying offer to retain his NHL rights and, on 27 July 2015, Haula filed for Salary Arbitration.

The 2015–16 season saw a breakout year for Haula, as he set NHL personal bests in goals, assists, and points, more than doubling his previous highs in all three categories. He centered Minnesota's third line with Nino Niederreiter and Jason Pominville, quickly becoming Minnesota's most effective line offensively as well as acting as a shutdown line against the league's best.

==== Vegas Golden Knights ====
At the completion of his fourth season with the Wild in 2016–17, as a restricted free agent Haula was left exposed for the 2017 NHL Expansion Draft. After agreeing to a three-year, $8.25 million deal with the Vegas Golden Knights, Haula was Minnesota's required selection for the draft on 21 June 2017. In exchange for selecting Haula, the Knights received prospect Alex Tuch and sent a conditional third-round pick in 2018 to the Wild. When speaking of his new team, Haula said: "Nothing has happened [in Vegas] before. Everything is new. It's a great opportunity for everybody, so you just start building from there...I'm really excited for this opportunity in my career." However, on 14 October, Haula suffered a lower-body injury and was expected to miss at least one week. After missing four games, he returned to the Golden Knights lineup on 27 October for a contest against the Colorado Avalanche. Upon returning to the Golden Knights, Haula was moved around the lineup and centered a line between David Perron and James Neal, resulting in an increased output. During the month of December, Haula and teammate William Karlsson each recorded seven goals, which tied for the eighth-most in the league. On 1 February, Haula scored a goal to help the Golden Knights set a record for most wins by an NHL team in its inaugural season. He ended the regular season with a career-high 29 goals for 55 points through 76 games.

Following his career-high regular season, Haula and the Golden Knights faced off against the Los Angeles Kings in the first round of the 2018 Stanley Cup playoffs. During Game 2, Haula ended the longest game in the franchise's history by scoring the second overtime game-winning goal to give the Golden Knights a 2–1 win over the Kings. The Golden Knights eventually swept the Kings in four games to qualify for the second round. During Game 1 against the San Jose Sharks, Haula, Cody Eakin, and Jonathan Marchessault all scored goals within 1:31 of each other in the first period. The Golden Knights eventually beat the Sharks in six games to advance to the Western Conference Final, where they beat the Winnipeg Jets in five games.

Haula returned to the Golden Knights for the 2018–19 season without his previous linemates, Perron and Neal. As a result, Haula was moved to the wing position on the teams' second line with Max Pacioretty and center Paul Stastny. While playing on this line, he sustained a right leg injury when he was hit by Toronto Maple Leafs forward Patrick Marleau and was expected to miss three games. At the time of the injury, Haula had recorded two goals and five assists in 15 games. However, it was later revealed he would need a few months to recover and was placed on injured reserve. In December 2018, Haula underwent surgery on his right knee.

==== Carolina Hurricanes ====
On 26 June 2019, Haula was traded by the Golden Knights to the Carolina Hurricanes in exchange for prospect Nicolas Roy and a conditional fifth-round draft pick. Haula then started the 2019–20 season with eight points through nine games and was praised by teammate Jordan Martinook as being a "perfect fit". By November, Haula had tallied 11 points in 16 games to place fourth on the Hurricanes in goals before missing four games with a lower body injury. Upon returning to the lineup, he centered Brock McGinn and Brian Gibbons on the team's fourth line. He returned for two games before being named out indefinitely on 18 November due to a knee injury. Haula subsequently missed 15 games before returning on 21 December for a 4–2 loss to the Florida Panthers.

==== Florida Panthers ====
As an impending free agent, Haula was dealt at the NHL trade deadline by the Hurricanes along with Lucas Wallmark, Eetu Luostarinen and Chase Priskie to the Florida Panthers in exchange for Vincent Trocheck on 24 February 2020.

==== Nashville Predators ====
On 23 December 2020, approaching the delayed 2020–21 season, Haula signed as a free agent with the Nashville Predators, agreeing to a one-year, $1.75 million contract. He recorded 9 goals and 21 points in 51 games of the shortened season.

==== Boston Bruins ====
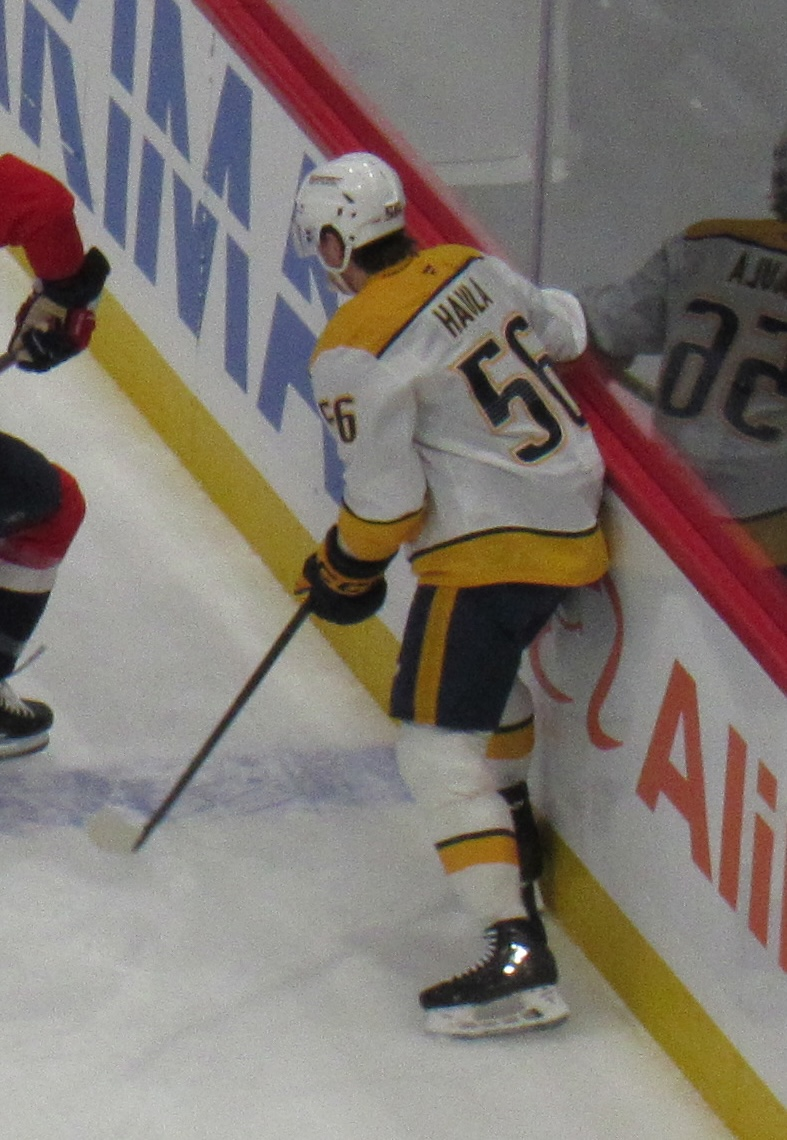
Haula with the Predators in 2026

As a free agent at the conclusion of his contract with the Predators, Haula was signed to a two-year, $4.75 million contract with the Boston Bruins on 28 July 2021. During training and camp and the pre-season, Haula centered a line with Jake DeBrusk and Nick Foligno. On 13 November 2021, Haula scored his first Bruins goal, as part of a road game 5–2 Bruins win against the New Jersey Devils. Despite a slow start, Haula would finish the season with 18 goals and 44 points in 78 games, his best totals since 2017–18.

==== New Jersey Devils ====
On 13 July 2022, Haula was traded to the New Jersey Devils in exchange for Pavel Zacha.

On 23 June 2023, he signed a three-year, $9.45 million extension with the Devils.

==== Return to Nashville ====
On 18 June 2025, Haula was traded back to the Predators in exchange for Jeremy Hanzel and a 4th-round pick in 2025.

==== Los Angeles Kings ====
On 1 July 2026, Haula signed a two-year, $7.2 million contract with the Los Angeles Kings.

== International play ==
Medal record

Representing Finland

Men's ice hockey

Olympic Games
Bronze medal – third place	2026 Milano Cortina	

World Championships
Silver medal – second place	2014 Belarus	

IIHF World U18 Championships
Bronze medal – third place	2009 United States	

He represented Finland at the 2026 Winter Olympics and won a bronze medal.

== Personal life ==
In his youth Haula attended the Swedish-speaking Björneborgs svenska samskola, which is known for having multiple talented ice hockey players as students. Haula's father, Tomi, is an agent who represents ice hockey players.

== Career statistics ==
=== Regular season and playoffs ===
			Regular season					Playoffs
Season	Team	League	GP	G	A	Pts	PIM	GP	G	A	Pts	PIM
2006–07	Ässät	FIN U18	29	19	24	43	24	6	1	3	4	4
2007–08	Ässät	FIN U18	3	1	1	2	0	2	4	2	6	14
2007–08	Ässät	FIN U20	40	7	15	22	26	12	2	0	2	4
2008–09	Shattuck-Saint Mary's	Midget AAA	49	24	55	79	42	—	—	—	—	—
2009–10	Omaha Lancers	USHL	56	28	44	72	59	8	2	9	11	2
2010–11	University of Minnesota	WCHA	34	6	18	24	22	—	—	—	—	—
2011–12	University of Minnesota	WCHA	43	20	29	49	30	—	—	—	—	—
2012–13	University of Minnesota	WCHA	37	16	35	51	14	—	—	—	—	—
2012–13	Houston Aeros	AHL	6	0	2	2	2	5	1	1	2	4
2013–14	Iowa Wild	AHL	31	14	13	27	14	—	—	—	—	—
2013–14	Minnesota Wild	NHL	46	6	9	15	29	13	4	3	7	0
2014–15	Minnesota Wild	NHL	72	7	7	14	32	2	1	0	1	0
2015–16	Minnesota Wild	NHL	76	14	20	34	24	5	1	3	4	2
2016–17	Minnesota Wild	NHL	72	15	11	26	28	4	0	1	1	0
2017–18	Vegas Golden Knights	NHL	76	29	26	55	37	20	3	6	9	27
2018–19	Vegas Golden Knights	NHL	15	2	5	7	10	—	—	—	—	—
2019–20	Carolina Hurricanes	NHL	41	12	10	22	20	—	—	—	—	—
2019–20	Florida Panthers	NHL	7	0	2	2	2	4	1	0	1	0
2020–21	Nashville Predators	NHL	51	9	12	21	14	6	1	3	4	4
2021–22	Boston Bruins	NHL	78	18	26	44	47	7	1	2	3	8
2022–23	New Jersey Devils	NHL	80	14	27	41	47	12	4	2	6	15
2023–24	New Jersey Devils	NHL	76	16	19	35	54	—	—	—	—	—
2024–25	New Jersey Devils	NHL	69	11	10	21	39	5	0	1	1	2
2025–26	Nashville Predators	NHL	81	14	24	38	64	—	—	—	—	—
NHL totals			840	167	208	375	447	78	16	21	37	58

=== International ===
Year	Team	Event	Result	GP	G	A	Pts	PIM
2008	Finland	U17	6th	5	2	8	10	18
2008	Finland	U18	6th	6	1	3	4	2
2009	Finland	U18	3rd place, bronze medalist(s)	6	3	1	4	2
2011	Finland	WJC	6th	6	4	3	7	10
2014	Finland	WC	2nd place, silver medalist(s)	6	0	1	1	2
2016	Finland	WCH	8th	1	0	0	0	0
2025	Finland	4NF	4th	3	0	0	0	0
2026	Finland	OG	3rd place, bronze medalist(s)	6	3	3	6	6
Junior totals				23	10	15	25	32
Senior totals				16	3	4	7	8

== Awards and honors ==
Award	Year
College
All-WCHA Second Team	2013
