= Antti Roppo =

Finnish ice hockey player

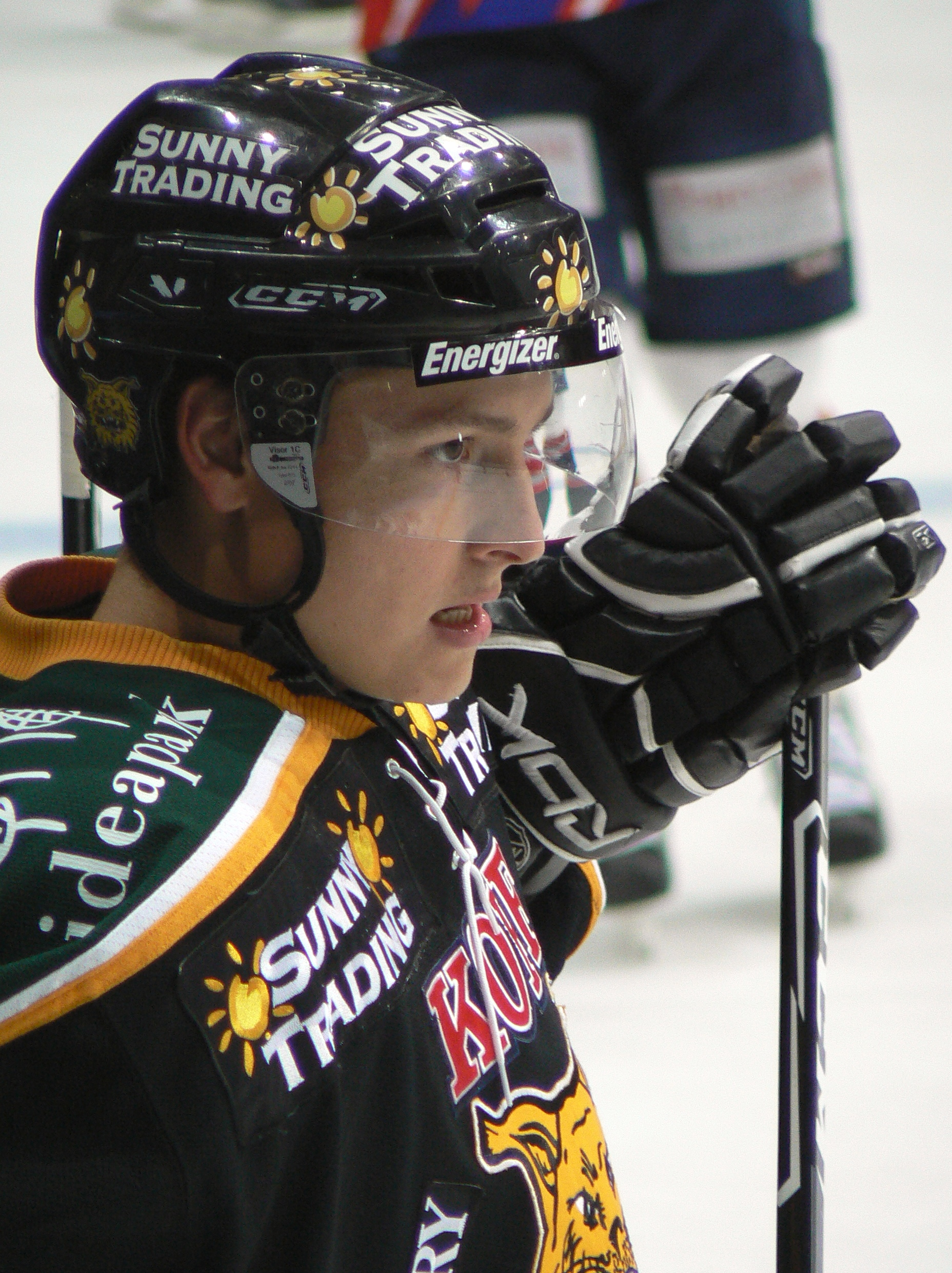
- Born: February 9, 1989 Tampere, Finland
- Died: February 8, 2018 (aged 28) Tampere, Finland
- Height: 5 ft 11 in (180 cm)
- Weight: 179 lb (81 kg; 12 st 11 lb)
- Position: Forward
- Shot: Right
- Played for: Ilves; HPK
- Playing career: 2004–2013

Antti Samuli Roppo (February 9, 1989 – February 8, 2018) was a Finnish professional ice hockey forward who played for Ilves and HPK of the SM-liiga.

== Career statistics ==
| | | | Regular season | | | | | Playoffs |
| Season | Team | League | GP | G | A | Pts | PIM | GP | G | A | Pts | PIM |
|---|---|---|---|---|---|---|---|---|---|---|---|---|
| 2004–05 | Ilves U16 | U16 SM-sarja | 22 | 17 | 21 | 38 | 2 | 3 | 1 | 0 | 1 | 2 |
| 2005–06 | Ilves U18 | U18 SM-sarja | 13 | 11 | 9 | 20 | 10 | 7 | 5 | 3 | 8 | 0 |
| 2006–07 | Ilves U18 | U18 SM-sarja | 8 | 3 | 7 | 10 | 29 | — | — | — | — | — |
| 2006–07 | Ilves U20 | U20 SM-liiga | 39 | 11 | 15 | 26 | 10 | 5 | 1 | 0 | 1 | 2 |
| 2007–08 | Ilves U20 | U20 SM-liiga | 35 | 20 | 16 | 36 | 10 | — | — | — | — | — |
| 2007–08 | LeKi | Mestis | 7 | 4 | 2 | 6 | 2 | 3 | 3 | 2 | 5 | 0 |
| 2007–08 | Suomi U20 | Mestis | 4 | 0 | 3 | 3 | 0 | — | — | — | — | — |
| 2008–09 | Ilves U20 | U20 SM-liiga | 18 | 13 | 7 | 20 | 2 | — | — | — | — | — |
| 2008–09 | Ilves | SM-liiga | 33 | 0 | 1 | 1 | 2 | 2 | 0 | 0 | 0 | 0 |
| 2008–09 | LeKi | Mestis | 9 | 3 | 2 | 5 | 2 | — | — | — | — | — |
| 2008–09 | Suomi U20 | Mestis | 6 | 2 | 4 | 6 | 0 | — | — | — | — | — |
| 2009–10 | Indiana Ice | USHL | 59 | 27 | 18 | 45 | 4 | 9 | 3 | 3 | 6 | 4 |
| 2010–11 | HPK | SM-liiga | 41 | 6 | 4 | 10 | 6 | — | — | — | — | — |
| 2010–11 | LeKi | Mestis | 2 | 1 | 2 | 3 | 0 | — | — | — | — | — |
| 2011–12 | HPK | SM-liiga | 54 | 6 | 5 | 11 | 8 | — | — | — | — | — |
| 2012–13 | KooKoo | Mestis | 43 | 10 | 8 | 18 | 8 | 11 | 2 | 1 | 3 | 4 |
| SM-liiga totals | | | 128 | 12 | 10 | 22 | 16 | 2 | 0 | 0 | 0 | 0 |
| Mestis totals | | | 71 | 20 | 21 | 41 | 12 | 14 | 5 | 3 | 8 | 4 |
