= Casey DeSmith =

American ice hockey player (born 1991)

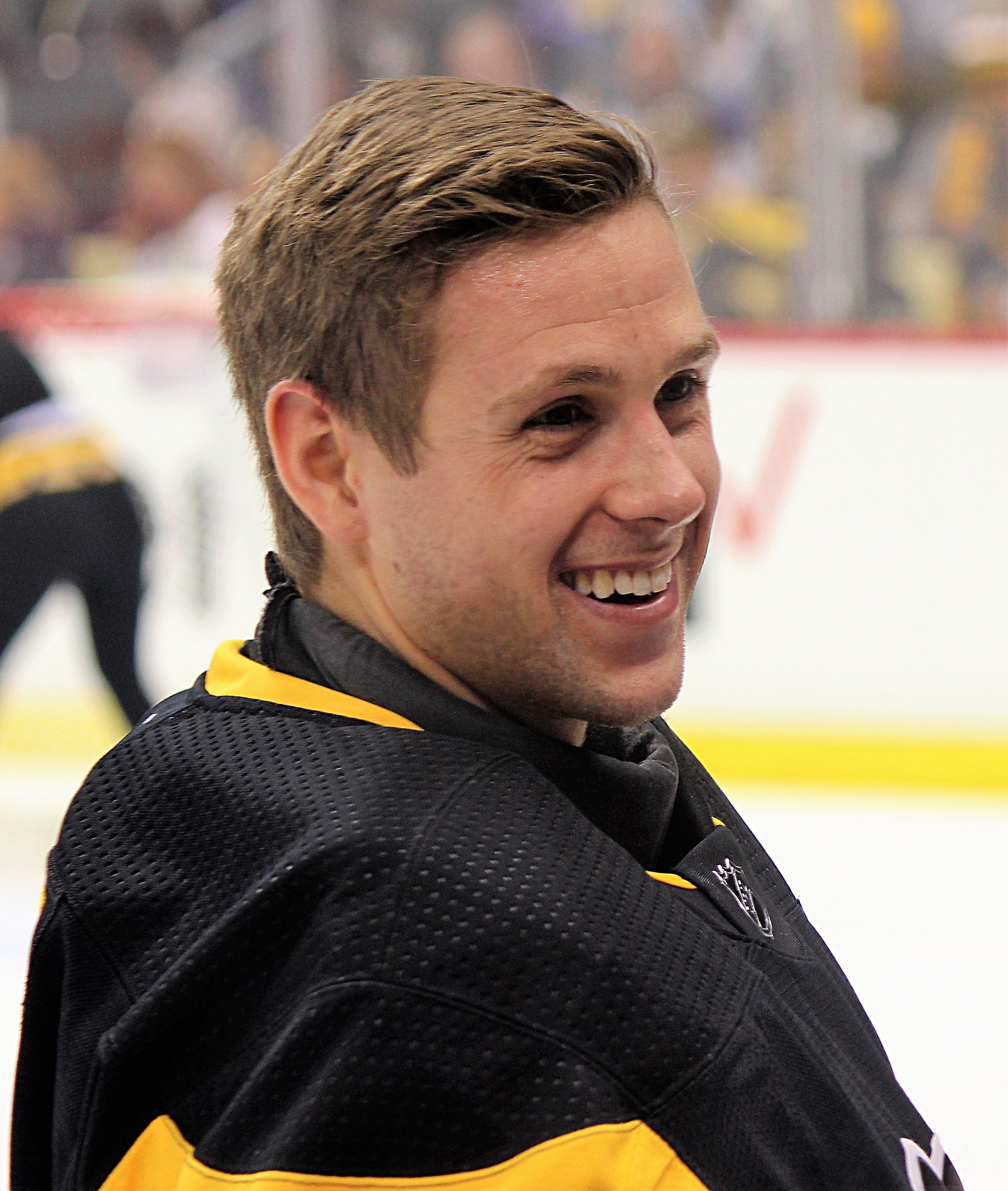
- DeSmith with the Pittsburgh Penguins in 2017
- Born: August 13, 1991 (age 34) Rochester, New Hampshire, U.S.
- Height: 6 ft 0 in (183 cm)
- Weight: 188 lb (85 kg; 13 st 6 lb)
- Position: Goaltender
- Catches: Left
- NHL team Former teams: Dallas Stars; Pittsburgh Penguins; Vancouver Canucks
- National team: United States
- NHL draft: Undrafted
- Playing career: 2015–present

Casey DeSmith (born August 13, 1991) is an American professional ice hockey player who is a goaltender for the Dallas Stars of the National Hockey League (NHL). He holds the Wilkes-Barre/Scranton Penguins record for most saves in a playoff game. DeSmith was named to the AHL's 2016–17 All-Rookie Team and was a co-recipient of the 2017 Harry "Hap" Holmes Memorial Award.

Undrafted and regarded as undersized for a goaltender, he signed with the Wheeling Nailers, the ECHL affiliate of the Pittsburgh Penguins, in 2015 after his college career at the University of New Hampshire was halted due to legal problems. After performing well both in Wheeling and while being loaned to the American Hockey League's Wilkes-Barre/Scranton Penguins later that season, he earned a promotion by signing an AHL contract in the summer of 2016.

After recording a league-best statistical performance 2016–17 AHL season, he signed a contract with Pittsburgh in July 2017, where he would play for the NHL squad for five of the next six seasons. DeSmith at first competed with Tristan Jarry and Matt Murray for NHL playing time; he spent the 2019–20 season in the AHL. He became a permanent part of the Penguins' goaltender rotation after Murray was traded in 2020. After being involved in two trades in the 2023 off-season, DeSmith played with the Vancouver Canucks in the 2023–24 season, signing with the Stars after the conclusion of his contract.

== Playing career ==
=== Junior ===
DeSmith played junior hockey in the NEPSAC league for Berwick Academy from 2006 to 2008. After one season with Deerfield Academy, he joined the Indiana Ice of the United States Hockey League, where he earned a 0.911 save percentage, a 2.80 GAA, and three shutouts in 64 regular season games.

=== College ===
DeSmith studied business at the University of New Hampshire, where he played hockey for the Wildcats from 2011 to 2014. In his first season, he compiled a 9–10–1 overall record. He earned his first college career shutout on January 11, 2011. At the end of his first season, DeSmith had a 2.33 goals against average while earning a .926 save percentage. He recorded 30 or more saves on 10 separate occasions throughout the regular season. DeSmith was named Hockey East Rookie of the Week for the week of January 11, and Hockey East Defensive Player of the Week for the week of February 6. He was also twice honored as the Service Credit Union Student-Athlete of the Week for the week of February 13, and for the week of March 5. He had a career-high 50 saves in the Hockey East quarterfinals against Boston University on March 11, 2012. At the end of the 2011–12 season DeSmith was named to the Hockey East All-Rookie team.

==== Arrest and expulsion from ice hockey ====
In September 2014, DeSmith was arrested for assaulting a woman who either was or had formerly been his girlfriend. He was suspended from the University of New Hampshire team immediately after his arrest, and he eventually was permanently dismissed.

DeSmith accepted a plea bargain on December 4, 2014. He pleaded not guilty to all charges against him (including domestic abuse) with the exception of a single count of disorderly conduct. Under New Hampshire law, "disorderly conduct" is considered a violation rather than a misdemeanor. He was sentenced to a $124 fine and 12 months of probation. He also signed a diversion agreement that included community service, which would lead to all charges being formally dismissed after 12 months. DeSmith met the terms of his plea bargain and stayed out of further trouble. He was never reinstated as a player for the Wildcats, although he continued to be enrolled as a student, and he did not play anywhere else all season.

DeSmith applied for a waiver transfer, so he could play for another school, but the NCAA denied his request. According to DeSmith, several other schools were interested in him.

=== Professional ===
==== Minor leagues (2015–2017) ====
On June 30, 2015, DeSmith signed a contract for the 2015–16 season with an ECHL team, the Wheeling Nailers, after the NCAA denied a transfer waiver to play a senior season of college ice hockey. He would have been ineligible to play college ice hockey after the 2015–16 season, because the NCAA normally only allows student-athletes five academic years to use up their standard four seasons of eligibility. DeSmith would appear in just 13 games with the Nailers' 2015–16 Eastern Conference championship team, posting a 5–2–2 record, a 2.55 goals against average, and a .915 save percentage.

On January 3, 2016, DeSmith was loaned to the Nailers' American Hockey League (AHL) affiliate, the Wilkes-Barre/Scranton Penguins. He played his first game for the WBS Penguins on December 26, 2015, against the Hershey Bears, stopping all seven shots he faced during his 20 minutes of play. He earned his first win in his first career AHL start on January 3, against the Hartford Wolf Pack, stopping 22 of 24 shots. He got his first shutout on April 1, 2017, making twenty-six saves against the Lehigh Valley Phantoms. DeSmith started the three final games of the 2015–16 AHL season. He won all three games with a .950 save percentage. DeSmith won his first professional playoff game during the 2016 Calder Cup playoffs on April 20, 2016, against the Providence Bruins. Three days later, he set a Wilkes-Barre/Scranton record for most saves in a playoff game facing 59 shots. The double overtime win clinched the Penguins' fourth division crown as the top-ranked team in the Eastern Conference. However, the Penguins would ultimately fall to the Hershey Bears.

On July 5, 2016, DeSmith signed a contract directly with the Wilkes-Barre/Scranton Penguins. He would play in 29 games for the WBS Penguins during the 2016–17 season. He finished the regular season at the top of the AHL with a 2.01 goals against average and a .926 save percentage. DeSmith started all five playoff games for the Penguins after partner Tristan Jarry was called up to the Pittsburgh Penguins during the 2017 Stanley Cup playoffs. He and Jarry would end the season as the best goaltending tandem in the AHL. The duo was awarded the 2017 Harry "Hap" Holmes Memorial Award, for the goaltenders of an AHL team with the lowest goals against average. DeSmith was voted to the AHL's 2016–17 All-Rookie Team, along with teammate Jake Guentzel. After the Wilkes-Barre/Scranton season ended, DeSmith returned to Pittsburgh and served as a "Black Ace" during the Pittsburgh Penguins' 2017 Stanley Cup run.

==== Pittsburgh Penguins ====
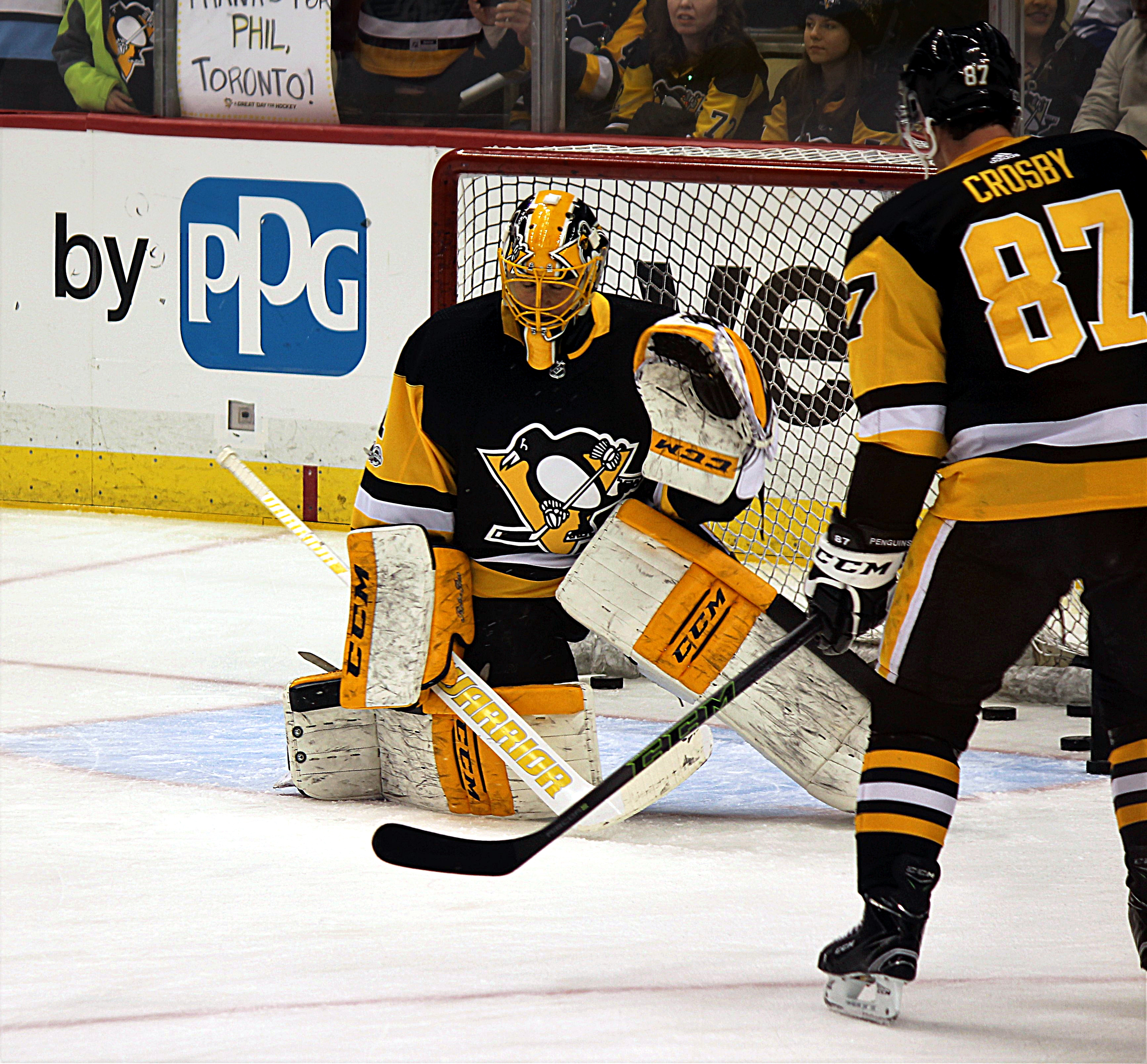
DeSmith warms up with Sidney Crosby prior to a game in 2017.

On July 1, 2017, DeSmith signed a one-year, two-way contract with the Pittsburgh Penguins. He started the 2017–18 AHL season with a 3–0 record with a .980 goals against average, a .965 save percentage, and one shutout. He ranked second in the AHL in goal-against average and third in save percentage. On October 23, 2017, executive vice president and general manager Jim Rutherford announced that Pittsburgh had recalled DeSmith from Wilkes-Barre/Scranton. He played in his first NHL game on October 29, against the Winnipeg Jets after head coach Mike Sullivan pulled starting goaltender Matt Murray in the first period. In doing so, he became the 62nd former Nailer/Thunderbird to reach the NHL and the first member of the 2015–16 Eastern Conference championship team to reach the NHL. In his first NHL game DeSmith made 12 saves in a little over 40 minutes of play. On October 30, he was re-assigned back to Wilkes-Barre/Scranton. DeSmith was recalled on November 28, to play backup to Tristan Jarry after starting goaltender Matt Murray was injured. In a game against the Toronto Maple Leafs on December 9, he filled in for Jarry in the second period marking his second NHL appearance. Despite his efforts, the Penguins ended up losing 4–3. He was re-assigned to the Wilkes-Barre/Scranton Penguins a game later as Murray was activated from injured reserve.

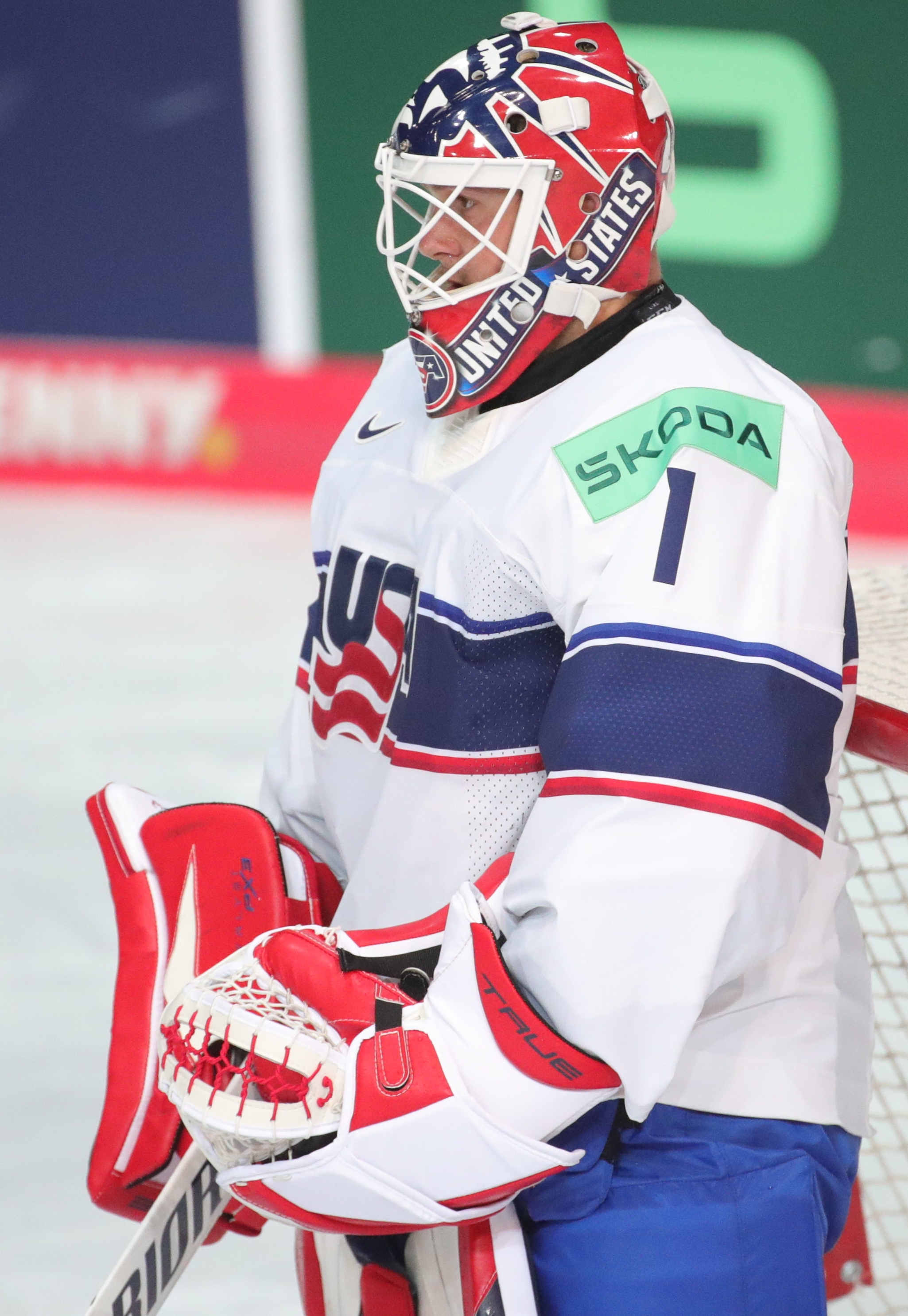
DeSmith with Team USA in 2023

DeSmith was again recalled to Pittsburgh on January 12, 2018. On January 18, DeSmith made his first NHL start and earned his first NHL win, stopping 28 of 29 shots in a 3–1 win over the Los Angeles Kings. Despite his success, he was re-assigned to Wilkes-Barre/Scranton on February 4. On February 26, Pittsburgh recalled DeSmith, once again switching with Jarry for the backup goaltender position. He recorded his first NHL career shutout on April 6, to help the Penguins clinch home ice advantage for Game 1 of the 2018 Stanley Cup playoffs.

During the 2018–19 season, having established himself in the backup role for the Penguins, DeSmith was signed to a three-year, $3.75 million contract extension with Pittsburgh on January 11, 2019.

DeSmith was sent back to Wilkes-Barre at the beginning of the 2019–20 season, because the Penguins preferred to keep Jarry on the roster as the backup goaltender. The Penguins wanted to call up DeSmith on January 4, 2020. However, the game that night was at Montreal, and DeSmith was unable to travel to Canada because he had misplaced his passport. Emil Larmi was called up from the ECHL's Wheeling Nailers instead.

In the 2020–21 season, which was shortened by the COVID-19 pandemic, DeSmith served as full-time backup to Jarry for the Penguins, compiling an 11–7–0 record in starts with a .912 save percentage. The following season, he had an 11–6–5 record during the regular season with an .914 save percentage. DeSmith found himself in the spotlight when Jarry injured his foot shortly before the beginning of the 2022 Stanley Cup playoffs, elevating him to the starting goaltender position. In his first NHL playoff start in Game 1 of the first round series against the New York Rangers, DeSmith made 48 saves on 51 shots in the course of regulation time and two periods of overtime. Midway through double overtime he was forced to exit the game, ceding the net to Louis Domingue. Days later, it was announced that DeSmith had required core muscle surgery and would miss the remainder of the playoffs.

On July 5, 2022, the Penguins re-signed DeSmith to a two-year, $3.6 million contract.

==== Vancouver Canucks ====
On August 6, 2023, DeSmith was traded to the Montreal Canadiens as part of a three-team trade also involving the San Jose Sharks. Shortly thereafter, he was dealt once again on September 19, to the Vancouver Canucks in exchange for Tanner Pearson and a 2025 third-round pick.

==== Dallas Stars ====
On July 1, 2024, DeSmith signed a three-year, $3 million contract with the Dallas Stars.

== Personal life ==
DeSmith is a devout Christian.

== Records ==
- Most saves in an AHL playoff game (59), Wilkes-Barre/Scranton

== Career statistics ==
=== Regular season and playoffs ===
			Regular season									Playoffs
Season	Team	League	GP	W	L	T/OT	MIN	GA	SO	GAA	SV%	GP	W	L	MIN	GA	SO	GAA	SV%
2009–10	Indiana Ice	USHL	27	11	11	1	1,434	76	0	3.18	.897	8	4	3	412	17	0	2.48	.922
2010–11	Indiana Ice	USHL	37	22	13	2	2,174	92	3	2.54	.920	4	2	2	229	10	1	2.63	.929
2011–12	University of New Hampshire	HE	22	9	10	1	1,285	50	1	2.33	.926	—	—	—	—	—	—	—	—
2012–13	University of New Hampshire	HE	38	19	10	7	2,204	82	5	2.23	.924	—	—	—	—	—	—	—	—
2013–14	University of New Hampshire	HE	37	20	16	0	2,148	86	3	2.40	.920	—	—	—	—	—	—	—	—
2015–16	Wheeling Nailers	ECHL	13	5	2	2	611	26	0	2.55	.915	—	—	—	—	—	—	—	—
2015–16	Wilkes-Barre/Scranton Penguins	AHL	6	2	2	0	309	10	0	1.94	.925	9	5	4	541	22	1	2.44	.919
2016–17	Wilkes-Barre/Scranton Penguins	AHL	29	21	5	1	1,731	58	1	2.01	.926	5	2	3	303	14	0	2.78	.916
2017–18	Wilkes-Barre/Scranton Penguins	AHL	27	16	8	3	1,562	71	2	2.73	.910	—	—	—	—	—	—	—	—
2017–18	Pittsburgh Penguins	NHL	14	6	4	1	701	28	1	2.40	.921	—	—	—	—	—	—	—	—
2018–19	Pittsburgh Penguins	NHL	36	15	11	5	1,944	89	3	2.75	.916	—	—	—	—	—	—	—	—
2019–20	Wilkes-Barre/Scranton Penguins	AHL	41	18	18	2	2,360	115	3	2.92	.905	—	—	—	—	—	—	—	—
2020–21	Pittsburgh Penguins	NHL	20	11	7	0	1,132	48	2	2.54	.912	—	—	—	—	—	—	—	—
2021–22	Pittsburgh Penguins	NHL	26	11	6	5	1,419	66	3	2.79	.914	1	0	0	90	3	0	2.02	.941
2022–23	Pittsburgh Penguins	NHL	38	15	16	4	2,066	109	0	3.17	.905	—	—	—	—	—	—	—	—
2023–24	Vancouver Canucks	NHL	29	12	9	6	1,663	80	1	2.89	.895	2	1	1	119	4	0	2.02	.911
2024–25	Dallas Stars	NHL	27	14	8	2	1,505	65	2	2.59	.915	2	0	1	70	4	0	3.42	.882
2025–26	Dallas Stars	NHL	30	15	8	6	1,755	71	1	2.43	.907	—	—	—	—	—	—	—	—
NHL totals			220	99	69	29	12,183	556	13	2.74	.910	5	1	2	278	11	0	2.37	.915

=== International ===
Year	Team	Event	Result	GP	W	L	T	MIN	GA	SO	GAA	SV%
2023	United States	WC	4th	7	5	2	0	431	14	2	1.95	.918
Senior totals				7	5	2	0	431	14	2	1.95	.918

== Awards and honors ==
Award	Year	Ref
College
Hockey East All-Rookie Team	2012	
AHL
All-Rookie Team	2017	
Harry "Hap" Holmes Memorial Award (with Tristan Jarry)	2017	
