= Matt White (ice hockey) =

American professional ice hockey player

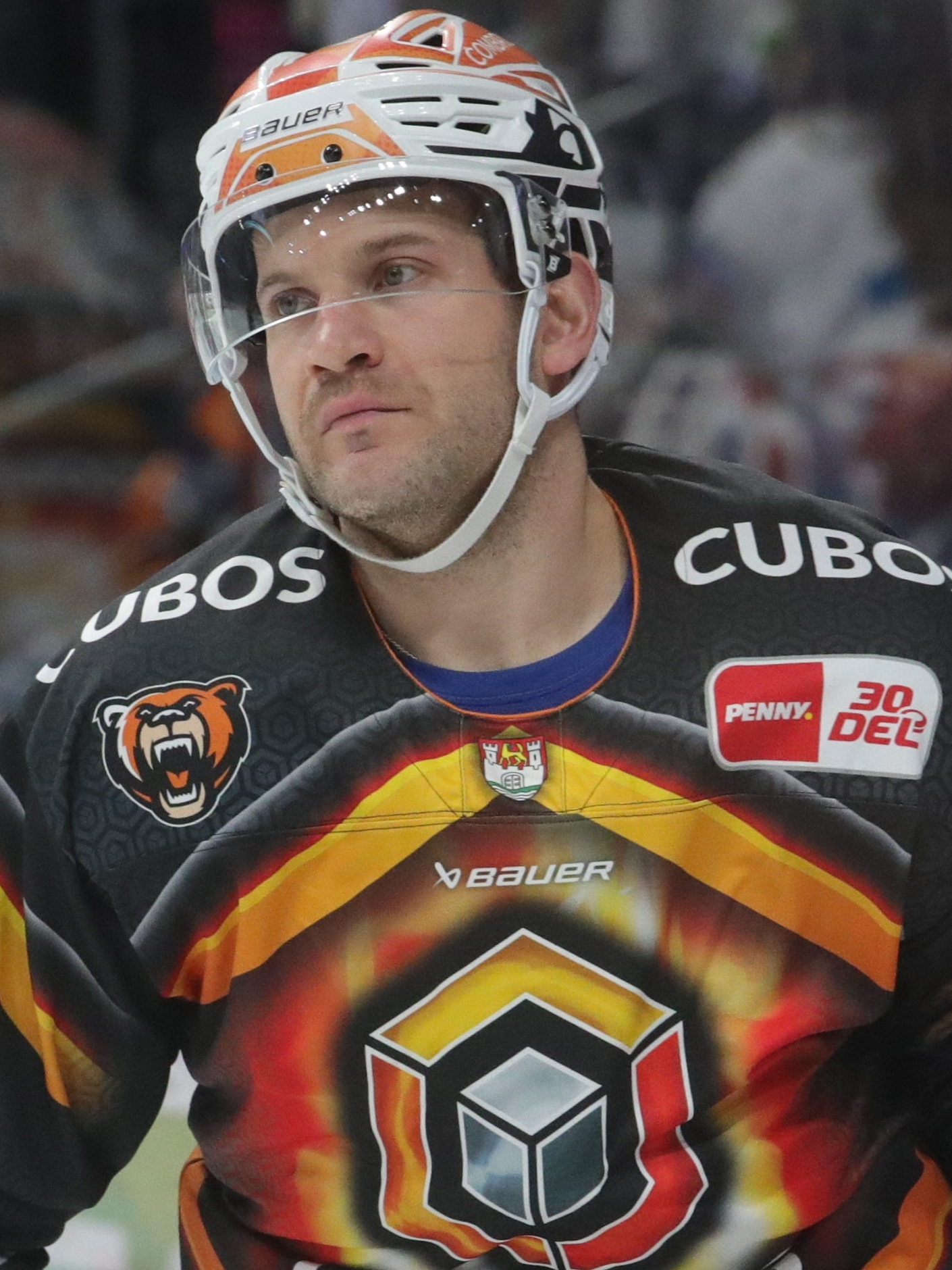
- White in 2023
- Born: August 23, 1989 (age 36) Whittier, California, U.S.
- Height: 5 ft 10 in (178 cm)
- Weight: 185 lb (84 kg; 13 st 3 lb)
- Position: Right wing/Left Wing
- Shoots: Left
- DEL team Former teams: Grizzlys Wolfsburg; HDD Olimpija Ljubljana; Milwaukee Admirals; Augsburger Panther; Neftekhimik Nizhnekamsk; Dinamo Riga; Eisbären Berlin
- NHL draft: Undrafted
- Playing career: 2013–present

Matt White (born August 23, 1989) is an American professional ice hockey player. He is currently playing under contract with Grizzlys Wolfsburg of the Deutsche Eishockey Liga (DEL).

== Playing career ==
In 2007 the native Californian began his junior career playing for the Omaha Lancers in the United States Hockey League (USHL). In the 2009–10 USHL season he was named the Player of the year as well as the most successful goal scorer in the league.

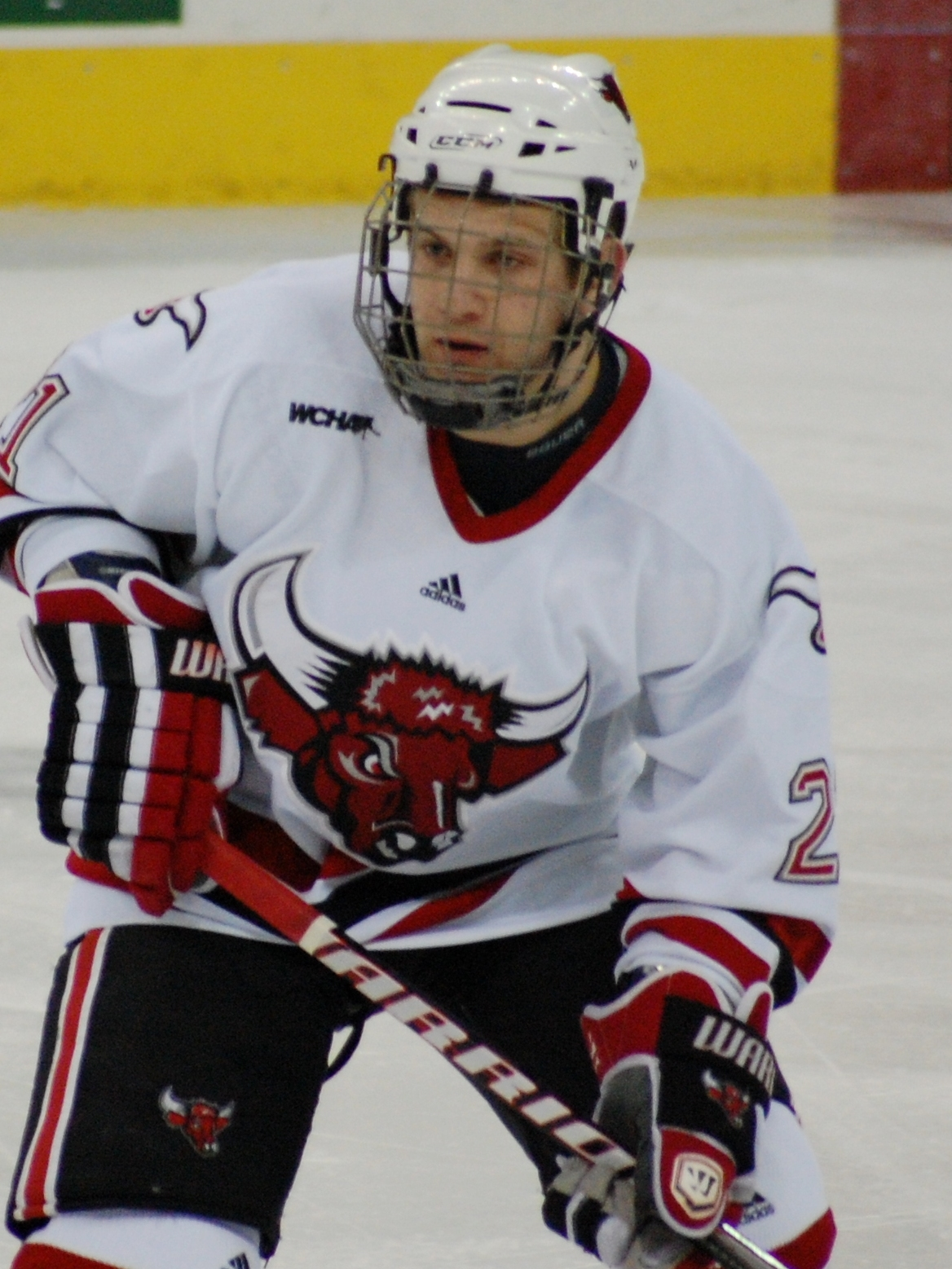
White playing collegiate hockey with the Omaha Mavericks in 2010

White went on to play NCAA hockey for the Omaha Mavericks from 2010 to 2013.

In 2013–14 season, White played in the ECHL for the Ontario Reign. During his professional rookie season he earned with 57 points the most successful player from his team.

Within the same period White also played for the U. S. National Inline Team at the IIHF Inline Hockey World Championship. He won a gold medal 2013 and a bronze medal 2014 and was named the most successful goal scorer in the 2014 tournament.

In 2014 he began playing for the Austrian Hockey League in the team of Ljubljana. After 11 games in Europe he again played for his previous ECHL team Ontario Reign.

He began the 2015–16 season in the ECHL with the Manchester Monarchs, on December 2, 2015, he was promoted to the American Hockey League (AHL) from the Milwaukee Admirals. He continued to play for the Admirals one more season.

In the 2017–18 season White returned to Europe and signed a contract with the Augsburger Panther of Germany's highest level hockey league, the Deutsche Eishockey Liga (DEL). During his first DEL season he ranked in the top 10 scorers in the entire league.

After two seasons with the Augsburg in the DEL, White left as a free agent to sign a one-year contract with Russian club HC Neftekhimik Nizhnekamsk of the KHL, on June 2, 2019. In the following 2019–20 season, White adapted quickly to KHL play positing 15 goals and 34 points in 60 games to lead Neftekhimik in scoring.

At the conclusion of his contract with Neftekhimik, White left as a free agent to continue in the KHL with Latvian-based club, Dinamo Riga, on August 6, 2020. For 2020-21 season he changed back to the DEL and played for the Eisbären Berlin. In his first year for the team from the German capital he won the league championship. Also in the 2021-22 season he was again a DEL champion with the Polar Bears; White was the top scorer from his team in regular and post-season. In the final game against the EHC Red Bull München he scored a hat trick.

For the 2023–24 season White left Berlin and signed with fellow DEL club Grizzlys Wolfsburg.

== Career statistics ==
			Regular season					Playoffs
Season	Team	League	GP	G	A	Pts	PIM	GP	G	A	Pts	PIM
2007–08	Omaha Lancers	USHL	38	5	11	16	21	13	2	8	10	2
2008–09	Omaha Lancers	USHL	60	17	30	47	28	3	1	2	3	0
2009–10	Omaha Lancers	USHL	57	35	47	82	53	8	4	7	11	6
2010–11	Omaha Mavericks	WCHA	39	14	11	25	10	—	—	—	—	–
2011–12	Omaha Mavericks	WCHA	38	17	23	40	14	—	—	—	—	–
2012–13	Omaha Mavericks	WCHA	37	16	18	34	8	—	—	—	—	—
2013–14	Ontario Reign	ECHL	71	22	35	57	8	4	0	1	1	0
2014–15	HDD Olimpija Ljubljana	EBEL	11	2	4	6	8	—	—	—	—	—
2014–15	Ontario Reign	ECHL	68	28	32	60	8	19	10	8	18	8
2015–16	Manchester Monarchs	ECHL	19	10	12	22	6	—	—	—	—	—
2015–16	Milwaukee Admirals	AHL	54	12	15	27	10	3	0	0	0	0
2016–17	Milwaukee Admirals	AHL	71	15	26	41	16	3	0	0	0	0
2017–18	Augsburger Panther	DEL	52	16	26	42	18	—	—	—	—	—
2018–19	Augsburger Panther	DEL	50	22	27	49	28	14	4	5	9	6
2019–20	Neftekhimik Nizhnekamsk	KHL	60	15	19	34	8	4	0	0	0	2
2020–21	Dinamo Riga	KHL	16	0	5	5	4	—	—	—	—	—
2020–21	Eisbären Berlin	DEL	38	19	20	39	10	9	7	3	10	0
2021–22	Eisbären Berlin	DEL	54	28	31	59	10	12	4	10	14	4
2022–23	Eisbären Berlin	DEL	56	16	35	51	10	—	—	—	—	—
2023–24	Grizzlys Wolfsburg	DEL	32	11	17	28	8	4	2	1	3	0
2024–25	Grizzlys Wolfsburg	DEL	52	18	31	49	6	—	—	—	—	—
AHL totals			125	27	41	68	26	6	0	0	0	0
DEL totals			334	130	187	317	90	39	17	19	36	10
KHL totals			76	15	24	39	12	4	0	0	0	2

== Awards and honors ==
Awards	Year
USHL
USHL-Champion (Omaha Lancers)	2007–08
USHL Player of the Year	2009–10
Dave Tyler Junior Player of the Year Award	2009–10
USHL All-Star Team	2009–10
College
WCHA All-Academic Team	2010–11
ECHL
ECHL Player of the Week	2014–15
DEL
Champion (Eisbären Berlin)	2021, 2022
