= Anthony Bitetto =

American ice hockey player (born 1990)

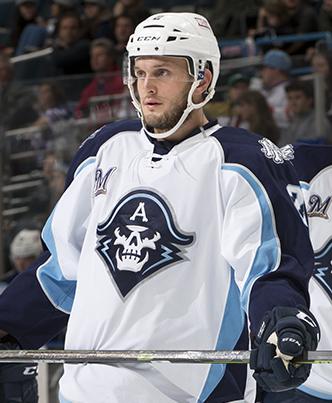
- Bitetto with the Milwaukee Admirals in 2015
- Born: July 15, 1990 (age 36) Island Park, New York, U.S.
- Height: 6 ft 2 in (188 cm)
- Weight: 201 lb (91 kg; 14 st 5 lb)
- Position: Defense
- Shot: Left
- Played for: Nashville Predators; Minnesota Wild; Winnipeg Jets; New York Rangers
- NHL draft: 168th overall, 2010; Nashville Predators
- Playing career: 2012–2023

Anthony Bitetto (born July 15, 1990) is an American former professional ice hockey defenseman. He most notably played in the National Hockey League (NHL).

== Early life ==
Bitetto grew up on Long Island, New York and was a New York Rangers fan throughout childhood.

== Playing career ==
He was selected 168th overall in the 2010 NHL entry draft by the Predators before committing to a collegiate career with Northeastern University in the Hockey East conference.

On March 29, 2012, Bitetto was signed to a two-year entry-level contract with the Nashville Predators. He then began his professional career in the 2012 playoffs with the Predators American Hockey League affiliate, the Milwaukee Admirals.

In the 2014–15 season, his third full professional season and leading the Admirals in scoring by a defenseman, Bitetto was recalled by the Predators and made his NHL debut against the Detroit Red Wings in a 5–2 defeat on January 17, 2015. Bitetto signed a two-year contract to stay with the Predators on February 26, 2016, and he scored his first career NHL goal on March 9, 2016, in a game against the Calgary Flames.

On January 9, 2018, Bitetto re-signed with the Predators.

During the 2018–19 season, Bitetto appeared in 18 games before he was placed on waivers by the Predators and claimed by division rival Minnesota Wild the following day, on January 25, 2019.

As a free agent from the Wild, Bitetto agreed to a one-year, two-way contract in joining his third central division club, the Winnipeg Jets, on July 2, 2019. Through 51 games with the Jets in the 2019–20 season, Bitetto registered career highs with 8 assists for 8 points, plus/minus rating, and average ice time (15:10). Bitetto led the Jets in hits per game (2.84) and ranked 23rd in the NHL, as well as fifth among NHL defensemen.

On October 9, 2020, Bitetto left the Jets as a free agent, and signed to a two-year, two-way contract with the New York Rangers. Growing up a Rangers fan, he said he was "speechless" playing in his first game as a Ranger at Madison Square Garden. During a game against the Washington Capitals on February 4, 2021, Bitetto scored his first goal as a Ranger in a 4–2 win. He had gone 112 games without a goal; his last goal was on November 18, 2017.

During the 2021–22 season, the Rangers traded Bitetto to the San Jose Sharks in exchange for Nick Merkley at the NHL trade deadline on March 21, 2022.

As a free agent in the off-season, Bitetto was signed to a one-year, two-way contract, with the Florida Panthers on July 13, 2022. His signing marked a reunion with former coach Paul Maurice during his tenure with the Winnipeg Jets.

After going unsigned throughout free agency, Bitetto announced his retirement on October 4, 2023.

== Career statistics ==
			Regular season					Playoffs
Season	Team	League	GP	G	A	Pts	PIM	GP	G	A	Pts	PIM
2006–07	New York Apple Core	EmJHL	20	6	7	13	45	7	3	3	6	10
2007–08	New York Apple Core	EmJHL	12	4	10	14	32	—	—	—	—	—
2007–08	New York Apple Core	EJHL	17	2	6	8	28	—	—	—	—	—
2008–09	New York Apple Core	EJHL	30	2	9	11	50	—	—	—	—	—
2008–09	Indiana Ice	USHL	24	1	3	4	29	13	0	3	3	6
2009–10	Indiana Ice	USHL	58	11	29	40	99	9	2	2	4	19
2010–11	Northeastern University	HE	38	3	17	20	66	—	—	—	—	—
2011–12	Northeastern University	HE	34	4	11	15	34	—	—	—	—	—
2011–12	Milwaukee Admirals	AHL	—	—	—	—	—	1	0	0	0	0
2012–13	Milwaukee Admirals	AHL	34	1	5	6	35	—	—	—	—	—
2012–13	Cincinnati Cyclones	ECHL	23	1	2	3	16	—	—	—	—	—
2013–14	Milwaukee Admirals	AHL	73	11	25	36	85	3	0	0	0	8
2014–15	Milwaukee Admirals	AHL	70	4	26	30	96	—	—	—	—	—
2014–15	Nashville Predators	NHL	7	0	0	0	7	—	—	—	—	—
2015–16	Nashville Predators	NHL	28	1	5	6	19	14	0	0	0	6
2015–16	Milwaukee Admirals	AHL	6	1	3	4	27	—	—	—	—	—
2016–17	Nashville Predators	NHL	29	0	7	7	25	—	—	—	—	—
2016–17	Milwaukee Admirals	AHL	3	1	2	3	0	—	—	—	—	—
2017–18	Nashville Predators	NHL	32	1	2	3	27	—	—	—	—	—
2018–19	Nashville Predators	NHL	18	0	3	3	8	—	—	—	—	—
2018–19	Minnesota Wild	NHL	18	0	0	0	4	—	—	—	—	—
2019–20	Winnipeg Jets	NHL	51	0	8	8	32	—	—	—	—	—
2020–21	New York Rangers	NHL	14	1	3	4	20	—	—	—	—	—
2020–21	Hartford Wolf Pack	AHL	2	0	0	0	0	—	—	—	—	—
2021–22	Hartford Wolf Pack	AHL	39	4	11	15	26	—	—	—	—	—
2021–22	San Jose Barracuda	AHL	14	2	0	2	28	—	—	—	—	—
2022–23	Charlotte Checkers	AHL	68	6	12	18	88	7	0	1	1	6
NHL totals			197	3	28	31	142	14	0	0	0	6

== Awards and honors ==
Award	Year
USHL
Clark Cup (Indiana Ice)	2009
Second All-Star Team	2010
College
Hockey East All-Rookie Team	2011
