= Pavel Zacha =

Czech ice hockey player (born 1997)

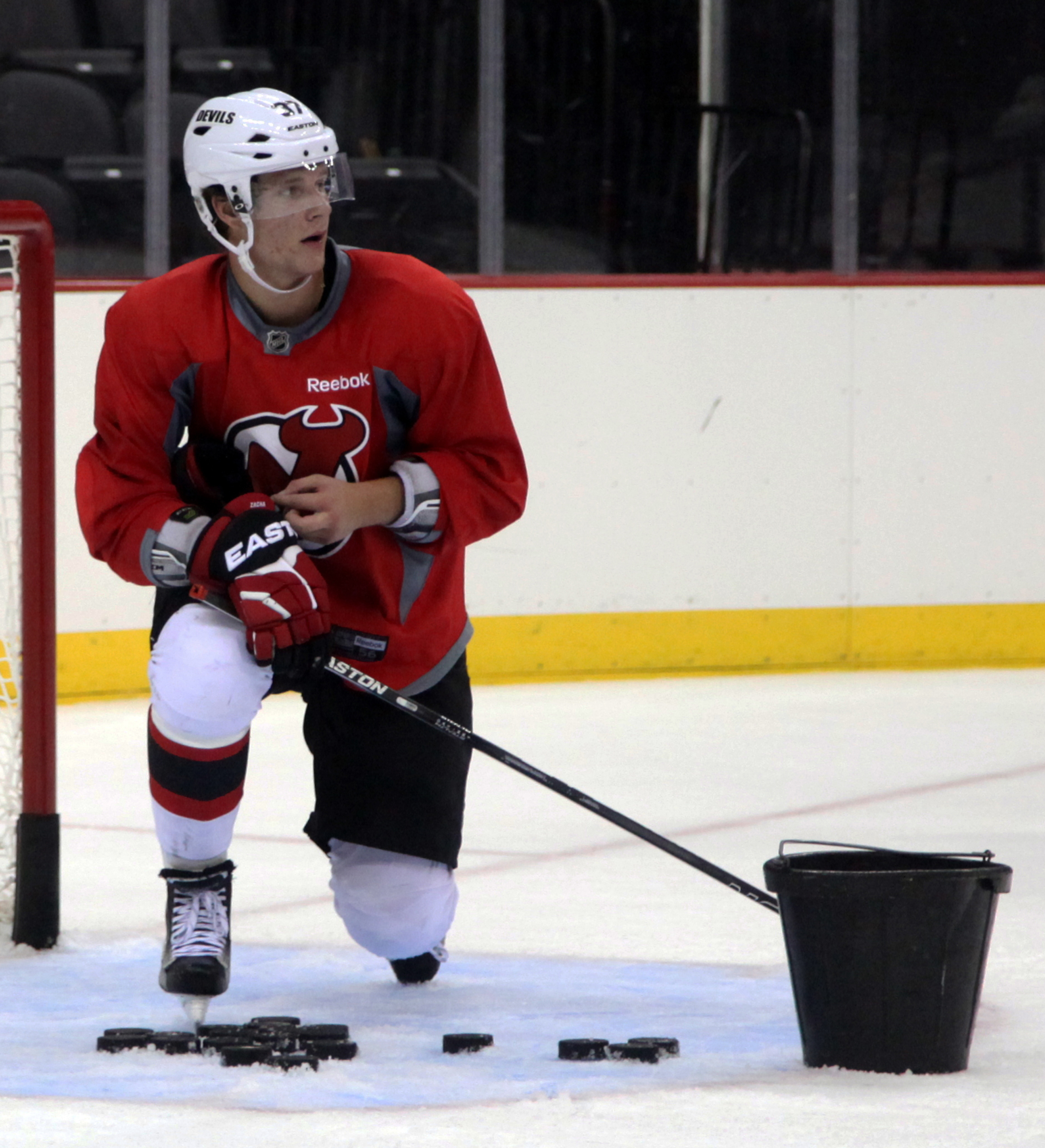
- Zacha with the New Jersey Devils in 2015
- Born: 6 April 1997 (age 29) Brno, Czech Republic
- Height: 6 ft 4 in (193 cm)
- Weight: 211 lb (96 kg; 15 st 1 lb)
- Position: Forward
- Shoots: Left
- NHL team Former teams: Boston Bruins; New Jersey Devils
- National team: Czech Republic
- NHL draft: 6th overall, 2015; New Jersey Devils
- Playing career: 2013–present

Pavel Zacha (born 6 April 1997) is a Czech professional ice hockey player who is a forward for the Boston Bruins of the National Hockey League (NHL). Zacha was selected sixth overall by the New Jersey Devils in the 2015 NHL entry draft.

== Playing career ==
=== Amateur ===
Zacha played in the 2009 and 2010 Quebec International Pee-Wee Hockey Tournaments with his minor ice hockey team from Chomutov.

Zacha made his Czech Extraliga debut playing with HC Bílí Tygři Liberec during the 2013–14 Czech Extraliga season.

In the 2014 Canadian Hockey League Import Draft, Zacha was selected first overall by the Sarnia Sting of the Ontario Hockey League (OHL). He joined the Sting for the 2014–15 season, recording 34 points in 37 games. Zacha followed up in his final season with the Sting by recording 64 points in 51 games. OHL coaches awarded Zacha as the best penalty-killer in the Western Conference after his 2015–16 season.

In 2014, 2015, 2016 Zacha competed in the IIHF World Junior Championship with the Czech Republic.

=== Professional ===
==== New Jersey Devils ====
Zacha was ranked eighth for North American skaters by the NHL Central Scouting Bureau for the 2015 NHL entry draft. He was selected sixth overall by the New Jersey Devils. On 11 August 2015, the Devils signed Zacha to a three-year, entry-level contract. He returned to the Sting for the 2015–16 season. Soon after the Sting season ended, Zacha joined the Devils. He made his NHL debut on 9 April 2016, recording two assists in a 5–1 win over the Toronto Maple Leafs.

Zacha made the Devils' lineup for the 2016–17 season. He scored his first NHL goal on 3 November 2016 in a 4–3 overtime loss to the Florida Panthers. He finished the season with eight goals and 24 points in 70 games.

After going pointless in ten games to start the 2018–19 season, Zacha was assigned to the Binghamton Devils of the American Hockey League (AHL) on 2 November 2018.

On 10 September 2019, Zacha signed a three-year extension with the Devils.

During the 2019–20 season Zacha recorded 32 points, a personal NHL career high.

==== Boston Bruins ====
On 13 July 2022, Zacha as a restricted free agent was traded by the Devils to the Boston Bruins in exchange for Erik Haula. In avoiding arbitration with the Bruins, Zacha was later signed to a one-year, $3.5 million contract for the 2022–23 season on 8 August 2022.

Zacha found success in his first season in Boston, mainly playing as a wing on the first line alongside Patrice Bergeron and Brad Marchand. Zacha had a career year, crushing his previous career highs in goals, assists, and points. On 14 January 2023, Zacha was signed to a four-year, $19 million contract extension by the Bruins. Zacha would play in all 82 games for the Bruins, scoring 21 goals and 36 assists for 57 points. He would also register six assists in the 2023 Stanley Cup playoffs, playing in all seven games of the Bruins first round loss against the Florida Panthers.

Following the news of David Krejčí and Bergeron's respective retirements in the summer of 2023, Zacha was expected to take a step up and serve as one of the Bruins top centers, after serving mostly as a winger the previous year. Zacha played centre up and down the line-up in the 2023–2024 season. After a four-game stretch where he scored five goals and two assists, Zacha was named the NHL Second Star of the Week in mid-March. Zacha tied his previous season total with 21 goals, but added 38 assists—two more than the previous season—to set a career high in assists and points for the second consecutive season.

Zacha entered the 2024–25 season moving back to the top-line wing with the Bruins addition of center Elias Lindholm, playing with Lindholm and David Pastrňák on the top line. Although Zacha scored a goal and an assist in the first two games of the season, he, along with the Bruins in general, struggled to produce offensively early on. Through the end of December, Zacha had scored nine goals and nine assists, and had been moved back to the center position in hopes of providing an offensive spark throughout the team. Although Zacha would improve throughout the season, the Bruins still struggled, and ended up missing the playoffs. Zacha finished the season with 14 goals and 33 assists, his lowest totals in Boston thus far.

== International play ==
Medal record

Representing Czech Republic

Ice hockey

World Championships
Gold medal – first place	2024 Czech Republic	

World U18 Championships
Silver medal – second place	2014 Finland	

Ivan Hlinka Memorial Tournament
Bronze medal – third place	2013 Slovakia/Czech Republic	

After the Bruins elimination in the 2024 Stanley Cup playoffs, Zacha went to represent the Czech Republic in the 2024 IIHF World Championship, his first time representing his country in ten years. Zacha would score the lone goal in a 1–0 quarterfinal victory over the United States, and would eventually help the Czechs to a gold medal.

On 16 June 2025, Zacha was announced as one of the first six players named to represent the Czech Republic at the 2026 Winter Olympics. On 7 February 2026, it was announced that Zacha would miss the 2026 Winter Olympics due to injury and would be replaced by Filip Chlapík.

== Career statistics ==
=== Regular season and playoffs ===
			Regular season					Playoffs
Season	Team	League	GP	G	A	Pts	PIM	GP	G	A	Pts	PIM
2011–12	Bílí Tygři Liberec	CZE U18	36	10	15	25	20	7	2	3	5	6
2011–12	Bílí Tygři Liberec	CZE U20	1	0	0	0	0	—	—	—	—	—
2012–13	Bílí Tygři Liberec	CZE U18	6	6	7	13	4	1	1	0	1	10
2012–13	Bílí Tygři Liberec	CZE U20	39	14	26	40	26	5	2	2	4	0
2012–13	HC Benátky nad Jizerou	Czech.1	—	—	—	—	—	1	0	0	0	0
2013–14	Bílí Tygři Liberec	CZE U20	10	6	11	17	64	3	1	1	2	4
2013–14	Bílí Tygři Liberec	ELH	38	4	4	8	10	—	—	—	—	—
2013–14	HC Benátky nad Jizerou	Czech.1	12	4	5	9	6	—	—	—	—	—
2014–15	Sarnia Sting	OHL	37	16	18	34	56	5	2	1	3	10
2015–16	Sarnia Sting	OHL	51	28	36	64	97	7	6	7	13	16
2015–16	New Jersey Devils	NHL	1	0	2	2	0	—	—	—	—	—
2015–16	Albany Devils	AHL	3	1	2	3	2	5	1	2	3	2
2016–17	New Jersey Devils	NHL	70	8	16	24	19	—	—	—	—	—
2017–18	New Jersey Devils	NHL	69	8	17	25	30	5	0	0	0	6
2018–19	New Jersey Devils	NHL	61	13	12	25	15	—	—	—	—	—
2018–19	Binghamton Devils	AHL	4	0	5	5	2	—	—	—	—	—
2019–20	New Jersey Devils	NHL	65	8	24	32	14	—	—	—	—	—
2020–21	New Jersey Devils	NHL	50	17	18	35	10	—	—	—	—	—
2021–22	New Jersey Devils	NHL	70	15	21	36	22	—	—	—	—	—
2022–23	Boston Bruins	NHL	82	21	36	57	16	7	0	6	6	2
2023–24	Boston Bruins	NHL	78	21	38	59	18	13	1	5	6	4
2024–25	Boston Bruins	NHL	82	14	33	47	21	—	—	—	—	—
2025–26	Boston Bruins	NHL	78	30	35	65	28	6	1	2	3	2
NHL totals			706	155	252	407	193	31	2	13	15	14

=== International ===
Year	Team	Event	Result	GP	G	A	Pts	PIM
2013	Czech Republic	U18	7th	5	0	3	3	2
2013	Czech Republic	IH18	3rd place, bronze medalist(s)	4	1	2	3	4
2014	Czech Republic	WJC	6th	5	0	0	0	0
2014	Czech Republic	U18	2nd place, silver medalist(s)	7	3	2	5	4
2015	Czech Republic	WJC	6th	5	1	1	2	0
2015	Czech Republic	U18	6th	5	5	0	5	10
2016	Czech Republic	WJC	5th	3	0	1	1	0
2024	Czechia	WC	1st place, gold medalist(s)	4	1	0	1	0
Junior totals				34	10	9	19	20
Senior totals				4	1	0	1	0

== Awards and honors ==
Award	Year
OHL
OHL First All-Rookie Team	2015
International
IIHF World U18 Championship Top 3 Player on Team	2015
Boston Bruins
Seventh Player Award	2023

Awards and achievements
Preceded by John Quenneville	New Jersey Devils first-round draft pick 2015	Succeeded by Michael McLeod
