= Matt Leitner =

American ice hockey player

- Born: November 27, 1990 (age 35) Los Alamitos, California, U.S.
- Height: 5 ft 9 in (175 cm)
- Weight: 190 lb (86 kg; 13 st 8 lb)
- Position: Forward
- Shot: Left
- Played for: Milwaukee Admirals; Ontario Reign; Springfield Thunderbirds; Utica Comets
- NHL draft: Undrafted
- Playing career: 2015–2018
Medal record
Ice hockey
Representing (United States) USA
World Junior A Challenge
Gold medal – first place	2009 Summerside

Matt Leitner (born November 27, 1990) is an American former professional ice hockey player who played in the American Hockey League (AHL).

== Playing career ==
Leitner was named an ACHA All-American (West First Team) as a senior at Minnesota State after leading the Mavericks in scoring with nine goals and 32 assists for 41 points in 2014–15. In his junior year, Leitner's outstanding play was rewarded with a selection to the 2013–14 All-WCHA First Team.

Following his third full professional season in 2018–19, Leitner ended his playing career, accepting an assistant coaching role at the collegiate level with California State University, Long Beach.

== Awards and honors ==
Award	Year
All-WCHA Third Team	2012–13
All-WCHA First Team	2013–14
All-WCHA First Team	2014–15
