= 2015 NCHC Tournament =

2015 NCHC Men's ice hockey tournament
- Dates: March 13–21, 2015
- Teams: 8
- Finals site: Target Center; Minneapolis, Minnesota
- Champions: Miami RedHawks (1st title)
- Winning coach: Enrico Blasi (1st title)
- MVP: Blake Coleman (Miami)
- NCHC Men's Ice Hockey Tournaments

The 2015 NCHC Tournament was the second tournament in league history. It was played between March 13 and March 21, 2015. Quarterfinal games were played at home team campus sites, while the final four games were played at the Target Center in Minneapolis, Minnesota. By winning the tournament, Miami received the NCHC's automatic bid to the 2015 NCAA Division I Men's Ice Hockey Tournament.

== Format ==
The first round of the postseason tournament features a best-of-three games format. All eight conference teams participate in the tournament. Teams are seeded No. 1 through No. 8 according to their final conference standing, with a tiebreaker system used to seed teams with an identical number of points accumulated. The top four seeded teams each earn home ice and host one of the lower seeded teams.

The winners of the first round series advance to the Target Center for the NCHC Frozen Faceoff. The Frozen Faceoff uses a single-elimination format. Teams are re-seeded No. 1 through No. 4 according to the final regular season conference standings.

=== Conference standings ===
Note: GP = Games played; W = Wins; L = Losses; T = Ties; PTS = Points; GF = Goals For; GA = Goals Against

2014–15 National Collegiate Hockey Conference standings
	Conference record								Overall record					
	GP	W	L	T	SOW	PTS	GF	GA	GP	W	L	T	GF	GA
#3 North Dakota†	24	16	6	2	0	50	72	55	42	29	10	3	138	94
#8 Miami *	24	14	9	1	1	44	73	60	40	25	14	1	130	100
#4 Omaha	24	12	8	4	3	43	67	56	39	20	13	6	105	90
#5 Denver	24	13	10	1	1	41	79	68	40	24	14	2	131	99
#6 Minnesota–Duluth	24	12	9	3	0	39	68	59	40	21	16	3	115	97
#10 St. Cloud State	24	11	12	1	0	34	69	56	40	20	19	1	109	97
Western Michigan	24	6	13	5	4	27	51	73	37	14	18	5	98	107
Colorado College	24	2	19	3	1	10	43	95	35	6	26	3	74	136
Championship: March 21, 2015 † indicates conference regular season champion; * indicates conference tournament champion Rankings: USCHO.com Top 20 Poll; updated March 23, 2015

== Bracket ==
Teams are reseeded after the first round

Quarterfinals; March 13–15
1	North Dakota	5	3	—
8	Colorado College	1	2	—
2	Miami	5	5	4
7	Western Michigan	3	7	0
(Pairings are reseeded after the first round)
3	Omaha	1	1	—
6	St. Cloud State	2**	3	—
4	Denver	4	4	—
5	Minnesota-Duluth	3	0	—

Semifinals; March 20
1	North Dakota	1
6	St. Cloud State	3
2	Miami	6
4	Denver	3

Championship; March 21
6	St. Cloud State	2
2	Miami	3
Third Place
1	North Dakota	1
4	Denver	5

* denotes overtime periods

== Results ==
=== Quarterfinals ===
All times are local.

==== (1) North Dakota vs. (8) Colorado College ====
March 13	North Dakota	5–1	Colorado College	Ralph Engelstad Arena	Recap
Brendan O'Donnell (12) – PP – (Mattson, LaDue) – 08:01		First period	No scoring
Nick Mattson (4) – (unassisted) – 14:48; Connor Gaarder (7) – (Poganski) – 19:56		Second period	No scoring
Paul LaDue (5) – (Mattson, L. Johnson) – 04:01; Tucker Poolman (7) – (Stecher, Pattyn) – 07:07		Third period	02:14 – Matt Hansen (3) – (unassisted)
Zane McIntyre ( 21 saves / 22 shots )		Goalie stats	Tyler Marble ( 21 saves / 26 shots ) Chase Perry ( 10 saves / 10 shots )

March 14	North Dakota	3–2	Colorado College	Ralph Engelstad Arena	Recap
Jordan Schmaltz (4) – (N. Schmaltz, Parks) – 16:16		First period	15:23 – Teemu Kivihalme (5) – (Roos, Stoykewych)
Brendan O'Donnell (13) – (Mattson, Poganski) – 09:20		Second period	No scoring
Connor Gaarder (8) – (Poganski, Chyzyk) – 18:38		Third period	06:10 – Luc Gerdes (4) – (Bradley, Fejes)
Zane McIntyre ( 31 saves / 33 shots )		Goalie stats	Tyler Marble ( 28 saves / 31 shots )

North Dakota wins series 2 – 0

==== (2) Miami vs. (7) Western Michigan ====
March 13	Miami	5–3	Western Michigan	Goggin Ice Center	Recap
Blake Coleman (14) – (Barber, Paulides) – 09:42		First period	18:43 – Colton Hargrove (13) – (Dries)
Louie Belpedio (5) – PP – (unassisted) – 12:07		Second period	06:11 – SH – Sheldon Dries (14) – (unassisted)
Kevin Morris (5) – PP – (Coleman, Belpedio) – 06:54; Blake Coleman (14) – (Barber, Joyaux) – 12:48; Alex Gacek (4) – EN – (unassisted) – 19:18		Third period	01:44 – Kyle Novak (8) – (Muir, Nitsche)
Ryan McKay ( 31 saves / 34 shots )		Goalie stats	Lukas Hafner ( 20 saves / 24 shots )

March 14	Miami	5–7	Western Michigan	Goggin Ice Center	Recap
Riley Barber (18) – (Sullivan, McKay) – 02:24		First period	12:11 – SH – Frederik Tiffels (10) – (unassisted)
Austin Czarnik (6) – (Murphy, Coleman) – PP – 08:28; Austin Czarnik (7) – (Louis) – 11:03		Second period	01:33 – Frederik Tiffels (11) – (unassisted); 02:17 – Nolan LaPorte (11) – (Dries, Hargrove); 09:48 – Colton Hargrove (14) – (LaPorte, Dries); 02:17 – PP – Kyle Novak (5) – (Kessel, Kovacs); 19:16 – Chris Dienes (5) – (Hargrove, Fleming)
Sean Kuraly (18) – (Morris, Louis) – EA – 16:22; Blake Coleman (16) – (Czarnik, Kuraly) – EA – 19:37		Third period	19:48 – EN – Will Kessel (7) – (Kovacs, Moldenhauer)
Ryan McKay ( 11 saves / 16 shots ) Jay Williams ( 7 saves / 8 shots )		Goalie stats	Lukas Hafner ( 19 saves / 22 shots ) Frank Slubowski ( 25 saves / 27 shots )

March 15	Miami	4–0	Western Michigan	Goggin Ice Center	Recap
Scott Dornbrock (2) – (Gacek, Wideman) – 10:30		First period	No scoring
Riley Barber (19) – (Murphy, Coleman) – 01:57; Austin Czarnik (8) – (Morris, Louis) – 03:12		Second period	No scoring
Blake Coleman (17) – EN – (Morris) – 15:07		Third period	No scoring
Jay Williams ( 35 saves / 35 shots )		Goalie stats	Frank Slubowski ( 8 saves / 11 shots ) Lukas Hafner ( 14 saves / 14 shots )

Miami wins series 2–1

==== (3) Omaha vs. (6) St. Cloud State ====
March 13	Omaha	1–2	2OT	St. Cloud State	CenturyLink Center Omaha	Recap
No scoring		First period		14:02 – David Morley (14) – (Nevalainen, Ilvonen)
Austin Ortega (19) – (Guentzel, Cooper) – SH – 09:43		Second period		No scoring
No scoring		Third period		No scoring
No scoring		Second overtime period		09:49 – Joey Benik (14) – (Morley)
Ryan Massa ( 7 saves / 8 shots ) Kirk Thompson ( 30 saves / 31 shots )		Goalie stats		Charlie Lindgren ( 45 saves / 46 shots )

March 14	Omaha	1–3	St. Cloud State	CenturyLink Center Omaha	Recap
No scoring		First period	15:59 – PP – David Morley (16) – (Storm, Ilvonen)
No scoring		Second period	11:47 – Nick Oliver (3) – (Rehkamp, Daly)
Grant Gallo (2) – (Brady, Guentzel) – EA – PP – 16:44		Third period	17:38 – Joey Benik (14) – (Murray)
Kirk Thompson ( 25 saves / 28 shots )		Goalie stats	Charlie Lindgren ( 35 saves / 36 shots )

St. Cloud State wins series 2 – 0

==== (4) Denver vs. (5) Minnesota-Duluth ====
March 13	Denver	4–3	Minnesota-Duluth	Magness Arena	Recap
Ty Loney (8) – (unassisted) – 10:52		First period	05:00 – Kyle Osterberg (6) – (Toninato, Corrin)
No scoring		Second period	04:42 – Andy Welinski (9) – (D. Johnson, Cameranesi)
Ty Loney (9) – (Janssen, Q. Shore) – 01:22; Danton Heinen (15) – (LaLeggia, N. Zajac) – PP – 06:46; Ty Loney (10) – (Q. Shore, LaLeggia) – 15:26		Third period	03:32 – Cal Decowski (4) – (Thomas)
Tanner Jaillet ( 27 saves / 30 shots )		Goalie stats	Kasimir Kaskisuo ( 28 saves / 32 shots )

March 14	Denver	4–0	Minnesota-Duluth	Magness Arena	Recap
Trevor Moore (20) – (unassisted) – 19:38		First period	No scoring
Danton Heinen (16) – (Butcher, Levin) – 07:36; Matt Tabrum (2) – (Jacobson, Arnold) – 12:38		Second period	No scoring
Joey LaLeggia (13) – (unassisted) – EA – 17:37		Third period	No scoring
Evan Cowley ( 36 saves / 36 shots )		Goalie stats	Kasimir Kaskisuo ( 28 saves / 31 shots )

Denver wins series 2–0

=== Semifinals ===
==== (1) North Dakota vs. (6) St. Cloud State ====
March 20	North Dakota	1–3	St. Cloud State	Target Center	Recap
Keaton Thompson (3) – (Poolman, Simonson) – 15:02		First period	19:35 – David Morley (17) – (Brodzinski, Prow); 19:54 – Joey Benik (15) – (Russell)
No scoring		Second period	No scoring
No scoring		Third period	18:55 – EN – Joe Rehkamp (5) – (Bertsch, Rabey)
Zane McIntyre ( 21 saves / 23 shots )		Goalie stats	Charlie Lindgren ( 19 saves / 20 shots )

==== (2) Miami vs. (4) Denver ====
March 20	Miami	6–3	Denver	Target Center	Recap
Riley Barber (20) – (Caito) – 14:15; Anthony Louis (8) – (Czarnik, Caito) – 18:58		First period	17:27 – Will Butcher (3) – (Didier)
Cody Murphy (12) – (Coleman) – 04:53; Austin Czarnik (9) – (Morris) – 18:26		Second period	18:52 – PP – Daniel Doremus (11) – (unassisted)
Louie Belpedio (6) – (Louis, Morris) – 09:38; Alex Gacek (5) – (Wideman, Paulides) – EN – 17:32		Third period	06:05 – Trevor Moore (21) – (Heinen, Doremus)
Jay Williams ( 22 saves / 25 shots )		Goalie stats	Evan Cowley ( 15 saves / 18 shots ) Tanner Jaillet ( 8 saves / 10 shots )

=== Third Place ===
==== (1) North Dakota vs. (4) Denver ====
March 21	North Dakota	1–5	Denver	Target Center	Recap
Connor Gaarder (9) – (O'Donnell, Poolman) – 14:34		First period	15:07 – Josiah Didier (3) – (unassisted); 17:50 – Quentin Shore (10) – (N. Zajac, Loney)
No scoring		Second period	10:27 – Matt Tabrum (3) – (VanVoorhis, N. Zajac)
No scoring		Third period	06:02 – Nick Neville (1) – (Arnold, Tabrum); 17:50 – Emil Romig (4) – (Moore)
Zane McIntyre ( 30 saves / 35 shots )		Goalie stats	Tanner Jaillet ( 25 saves / 26 shots )

=== Championship ===
==== (2) Miami vs. (6) St. Cloud State ====
March 21	Miami	3–2	St. Cloud State	Target Center	Recap
Blake Coleman (18) – (Barber, Murphy) – 16:15		First period	06:03 – PP – Jonny Brodzinski (20) – (Prow, Benik)
Blake Coleman (19) – (Czarnik, Belpedio) – PP – 07:37; Blake Coleman (20) – (Joyaux) – 09:20		Second period	12:00 – Joey Benik (16) – (Prow)
No scoring		Third period	No scoring
Jay Williams ( 18 saves / 20 shots )		Goalie stats	Charlie Lindgren ( 18 saves / 21 shots )

== Tournament awards ==
=== Frozen Faceoff All-Tournament Team ===
- F Blake Coleman* (Miami)
- F Austin Czarnik (Miami)
- F Joey Benik (St. Cloud State)
- D Louie Belpedio (Miami)
- D Tim Daly (St. Cloud State)
- G Charlie Lindgren (St. Cloud State)

* Most Valuable Player(s)
