= Blake Coleman =

American ice hockey player (born 1991)

- Born: November 28, 1991 (age 34) Plano, Texas, U.S.
- Height: 5 ft 11 in (180 cm)
- Weight: 199 lb (90 kg; 14 st 3 lb)
- Position: Forward
- Shoots: Left
- NHL team Former teams: Minnesota Wild; New Jersey Devils; Tampa Bay Lightning; Calgary Flames
- National team: United States
- NHL draft: 75th overall, 2011; New Jersey Devils
- Playing career: 2015–present

Blake Coleman (born November 28, 1991), nicknamed "Pickles", is an American professional ice hockey player who is a forward for the Minnesota Wild of the National Hockey League (NHL). He was selected in the third round, 75th overall, by the New Jersey Devils during the 2011 NHL entry draft and spent five seasons with them before being traded to the Tampa Bay Lightning. Coleman won back-to-back Stanley Cup championships with the Lightning in 2020 and 2021, becoming the second Texas-born player to win the Stanley Cup and first to be exclusively trained in the state.

== Early life ==
Coleman was born on November 28, 1991, in Plano, Texas to parents Sandy and Rusty. He was born into an athletic family; his father played football at the University of Oklahoma and his sister Brooke played volleyball at Ohio University. Besides Brooke, Coleman also grew up with three older siblings; a sister and two brothers. His grandmother sparked his interest in ice hockey as she took him to Dallas Stars games as a toddler. Coleman eventually learned to skate at the age of five at a rink in Irving, Texas before one opened in Plano.

== Playing career ==
=== Amateur ===
Growing up in Texas, Coleman often played with children above his age group and was forced to practice in the early morning due to limited ice time. As a youth, he played in the 2004 Quebec International Pee-Wee Hockey Tournament with the Dallas Alliance minor ice hockey team. While in middle school, Coleman was recruited to attend a Detroit-based Catholic school and play for the Belle Tire 16U AAA team in the Tier 1 Elite Hockey League (T1EHL). During his one season with the team, he was encouraged by coach Kyle Krug to play a tougher and more defensive game. When speaking of his time in the T1EHL, Coleman said: "The whole experience was unique...I think I put like 25 pounds that year because there was nothing else to do after school so I went to the gym a lot. It was a good year."

After losing in the national championship semifinals, Coleman returned to Texas where he was encouraged to continue developing in order to eventually try out for the USA Hockey National Team Development Program. As such, he played two seasons with the Dallas Stars Elite Hockey Club, helping them finish fifth and second respectively at the national midget major tournament. Due to his minor league play, Coleman was recruited to play in the North American Hockey League but instead chose to play in the United States Hockey League (USHL). Coleman played 22 games for the Tri-City Storm, tallying two goals and nine assists, before being traded to the Indiana Ice. After going undrafted in the 2010 NHL entry draft, Coleman returned to the Ice for the 2010–11 season. His sophomore campaign would prove to be a breakout season for him as he set numerous personal and league records. His line was also considered the best line in the league. Coleman finished the season with the USHL's scoring title by accumulating 34 goals and 58 assists for 90 points. This was also the most points scored in a USHL season since 1999-2000 and the first player to surpass 90 points since 2001–02. His 29 multi-point games and +52 plus-minus rating were also the highest rating on record since the USHL became Tier I in 2002. Coleman also received the USHL's Player and Forward of the Year award and the Dave Tyler Junior Player of the Year Award. He was also selected for the USHL's First All-Star Team. Coleman was recruited by Derek Lalonde to join the University of Denver's men's ice hockey team but he had already committed to Miami University. Prior to joining Miami University, Coleman was drafted in the third round, 75th overall, of the 2011 NHL entry draft by the New Jersey Devils. Although he had not been invited to the NHL Combine, a few members of the Devils organization developed physical assessment tests for Coleman to complete which included jumps and cardio.

=== Collegiate ===
Coleman played for the Miami RedHawks at Miami University from 2011 to 2015. There, he enrolled in the Farmer School of Business and completed his degree in business. Coleman recorded his first collegiate assist on October 8 against Bemidji State and his first collegiate goal on October 28, 2011, against the Lake Superior State Lakers. However, the RedHawks continued to fall in the standings and entered November in last place in the CCHA standings. Coleman and fellow freshman Tyler Biggs and Jimmy Mullin began to pick up scoring through the month and slowly the RedHawks improved to .500 in overall and league play. By November 26, Coleman had registered two multi-point games to tie for second on the team with five goals. The trio continued to improve offensively and Coleman eventually tied for 11th among rookies in the CCHA with 12 points by late January. At the same time, the RedHawks' seven freshman players, Biggs, Austin Czarnik, Coleman, Mullin, and Alex Wideman, also combined for 28 goals on the year and 67 points. As a result of his outstanding play, Coleman was recognized with the CCHA Rookie of the Week honor for the week ending on January 29, 2012. By mid-February, Coleman and the RedHawks had improved to an 18–13–2 overall record as they ranked 19th in the standings. Coleman concluded his freshman season registering 12 goals and 11 assists for 23 points through 39 games.

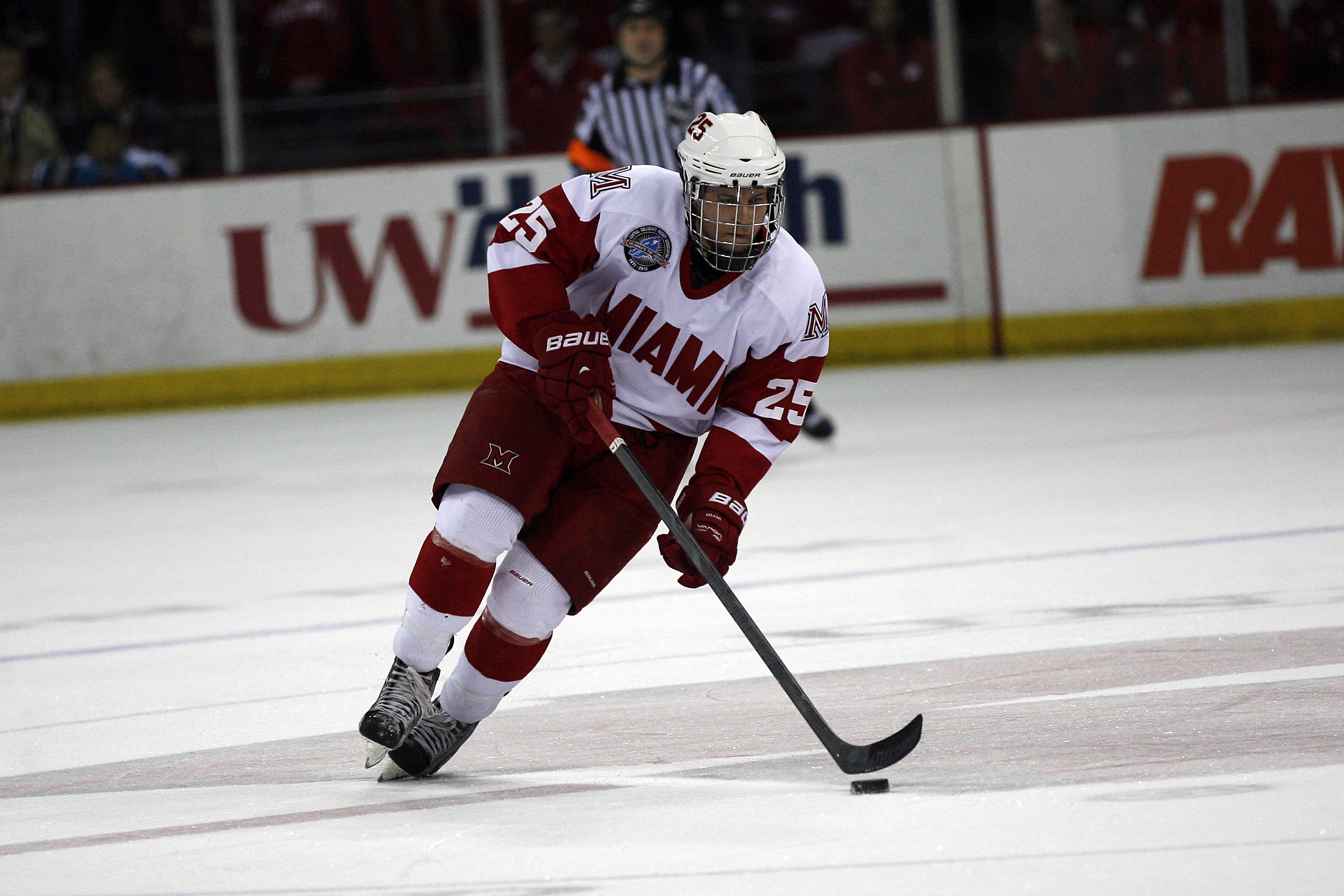
Coleman with Miami in 2013.

Following his freshman season, Coleman attended the New Jersey Devils' 2012 Rookie Camp. He then returned to the RedHawks for the 2012–13 season where he helped them advance to the Midwest Regional semifinals for the first time since 2010. Coleman began the season by leading the team with three goals and four points and tying for first in the country with 1.50 goals per game. As a result, he received the CCHA Offensive Player of Week honour for the week ending on October 15, 2012. Coleman finished the season with nine goals and 10 assists through 40 games to rank in the top five on the team in goals and assists. As the RedHawks qualified for the 2013 NCAA Division I men's ice hockey tournament, Coleman helped the team advance past Michigan State in three games to move into the CCHA semifinal round for the fourth straight year. Coleman was also selected for the NCAA All-Midwest Regional Team after he tallied a goal and two assists at the Regional tournament. Despite this, the RedHawks fell 4–1 to St. Cloud State.

Coleman returned to the New Jersey Devils' 2013 Rookie Camp after his sophomore season. He returned to the RedHawks for the 2013–14 season but was limited to only 27 games due to an injury in December. Coleman, Riley Barber, and Czarnik led the team in goals and points at the beginning of the season while the RedHawks maintained a losing 7–6–1 record. During this time, he netted a hat trick in a 6–2 win over North Dakota on October 19 and dished out a career-high three assists against Canisius on November 2. When Coleman returned to the lineup after missing 11 games, he made an immediate impact on the roster. In his first game back from injury in February, he scored two goals, including the game-winner, to lead Miami to a win over St. Cloud State. By March, Coleman had accumulated eight goals and four multi-goal games in six contests since his return. This included eight of Miami's last 10 overall goals and all four of Miami's goals over two games against Denver. As such, he was recognized as the NCHC Offensive Player of the Week or the week of March 3–9. Through the final six games of the regular season, Coleman scored eight goals on 32 shots. His 12 points in the final 10 games of the season pushed Miami to the NCHC Finals. He finished the season with a career-high 19 goals and 28 points and a selection onto the NCHC Academic All-Conference team.

In his final season with the RedHawks, Coleman set career highs in goals, assists, and points. He began the season strong and tallied four points in their NCHC-opening game split against Minnesota Duluth. He eventually received the NCHC's Offensive Player of the Week for the week ending on November 2. He had accumulated six goals and five assists for 11 points by November 11. During the NCHC Frozen Faceoff championship game, Coleman recorded his first career hat trick in Miami's 3–2 win over St. Cloud State. However, he was also ejected during the game after he received a game misconduct and was subsequently suspended for one game. At the time of his suspension, Coleman had recorded seven goal and five assists for 12 points through five games to earn NCHC Tournament MVP honors and be named to the NCHC All-Tournament Team. Coleman also earned the Miami Athlete of the Week honor and NCHC Player of the Month honors.

=== Professional ===
==== New Jersey Devils ====
After completing his college career and graduating from Miami University, Coleman signed a two-year entry-level contract with the New Jersey Devils. He was subsequently invited to their training camp before being assigned to the Devils' American Hockey League (AHL) affiliate, the Albany Devils, to begin the 2015–16 season. Coleman tallied four goals and three assists through 14 games before suffering a season-ending injury on November 27. The injury was a result of a hit from Mark Fraser of the Binghamton Senators who was subsequently suspended for two games. Following his disappointing rookie season, Coleman returned to the Albany Devils for the 2016–17 season after participating in the New Jersey Devils' training and development camp. Coleman recorded 13 goals and 10 assists through 34 games before being recalled to the NHL level on January 10. He subsequently made his NHL debut on November 12 on the third line between Devante Smith-Pelly and Nick Lappin. Coleman later recorded his first career NHL point in his fourth NHL game by assisting on Beau Bennett's goal in a 4–3 win over the Minnesota Wild. As Coleman remained on the NHL roster through February, Devils coach John Hynes played Coleman on a line with Miles Wood and Smith-Pelly due to his speed and aggressiveness. In his 17th career NHL game, Coleman became the fourth Texas-born player in NHL history to score against the Dallas Stars. His goal was the Devils' only of the game as they fell 2–1 to the Stars on March 26. Coleman appeared in 23 games for the Devils before returning to the AHL to play in the 2017 Calder Cup playoffs. Over 52 regular-season games in the AHL, Coleman tallied 19 goals and 20 assists for 39 points. On July 26, 2017, the Devils re-signed Coleman to a one-year, two-way contract worth $660,000.

In the first year of his new contract, Coleman appeared in 23 games for the New Jersey Devils and scored 13 goals and 12 assists for 25 points. As a surprise addition to the Devils' 2017–18 opening night roster, Coleman began the season on the fourth line alongside Brian Gibbons and Stefan Noesen. By December 17, Coleman had accumulated two goals and three assists through 27 games. Following the NHL Trade Deadline, Coleman changed his number from 40 to allow veteran Michael Grabner to claim the number. On March 23, Coleman registered his first two-goal game and third two-point game of the season. As the season winded down, Coleman found a role on the Devils' shutdown defensive line alongside Travis Zajac and Stefan Noesen. He subsequently finished his first full NHL season with 13 goals, including a team-high three shorthanded goals, and 12 assists for 25 points through 79 games. As the Devils qualified for the 2018 Stanley Cup playoffs, Coleman made his post-season debut on April 12, 2018, for their first round series against the Tampa Bay Lightning. His first career playoff point, a goal, came in the third period of Game 2 and was assisted by Travis Zajac and John Moore. Over the five games of their series, he tallied two goals and registered four penalty minutes. After originally filing for salary arbitration, Coleman signed a three-year, $5.4 million contract to remain with the Devils on July 17, 2018.

In the first year of his new contract, Coleman continued to improve on his previous season's success and set new career highs in goals, assists, and points. The Devils began the season on a four-game winning streak before losing three straight games. On November 15, Coleman recorded a career-high three-point night to lift the Devils to a 3–0 win over the Philadelphia Flyers and an 8–8–1 record. By December 1, Coleman had accumulated three goals and five assists for eight points over eight games. After Taylor Hall suffered an injury on December 23, Coleman quickly took over the team lead in scoring. He quickly matched his career-high 13 goals in 42 games, 37 games less than it took him during the previous season. While continuing to play on the Devils' third line, Coleman ranked second on the team in scoring with 18 goals through 49 games at the end of January. Prior to a game against the St. Louis Blues on February 12, Coleman was made a last-minute scratch due to an upper-body injury. He subsequently missed four games before returning to their lineup on February 19, where he played alongside wingers Kenny Agostino and Joey Anderson in their loss to the Pittsburgh Penguins. Although Coleman spent the first half of the season limited to a bottom-six and penalty-killing spot, injuries forced him into a top-six role late in the season. Coleman subsequently gained some experience on the Devil's top line and played a career-high 25 minutes. By March 5, Coleman had reached the 30-point milestone for the first time in his career by tallying 12 assists and 18 goals. Upon reaching this new milestone, Coleman added four points over four games and was promoted to the top line again. He finished the season second on the team in scoring with 22 goals and 14 assists for 36 points through 78 games.

Prior to the start of the 2019–20 season, Coleman was expected to return to a bottom-six role on the Devils' third line. Coleman began the season with new linemates, rookie Jack Hughes and veteran Wayne Simmonds. Coach John Hynes explained the reasoning behind the combination as wanting a mixture of young and experienced players on each line. However, by November Hughes was replaced with Nikita Gusev on the Devils third line. With his new linemate, Coleman recorded four goals and two assists over six games by mid-November. From the time Gusev replaced Hughes to January 15, Coleman accumulated 15 goals and recorded his first career NHL hat-trick. He subsequently became the second Texas-born player to record a hat trick, joining former Rangers defenseman Brian Leetch. On February 16, 2020, Coleman was traded to the Tampa Bay Lightning in exchange for Nolan Foote and a conditional first-round pick. At the time of the trade, Coleman had tallied 21 goals and 10 assists for 31 points through 57 games.

==== Tampa Bay Lightning ====
Upon joining the Lightning, Coleman made his debut on February 20 on the third line alongside Mitchell Stephens and Yanni Gourde. Coleman missed one game with his new team to witness the birth of his daughter before returning for practice on February 28. He ended up playing nine games with his new team, registering one assist, before the NHL paused play due to the COVID-19 pandemic. During the nine games, he played with Barclay Goodrow on the penalty kill, registered 25 hits, and registering two shots per game and 18 total. Coleman remained in Tampa for five to six weeks after the pause before relocating to Dallas.

Once the NHL resumed play, Coleman returned to Tampa and participated in their training camp ahead of the 2020 Stanley Cup playoffs. During their round-robin opener against the Washington Capitals, Coleman was paired with Goodrow and Gourde on the third line. They three had not played together during the regular season but were paired together because Jon Cooper felt they played in similar styles. As Coleman remained with Goodrow and Gourde for their First Round matchup against the Columbus Blue Jackets, they were compared to the Lightnings Triplets Line that drove the offence for the team during the 2015 Stanley Cup playoffs. The trio combined for five points in Game 4 and Coleman later scored his first goal as a member of the Lightning in Game 5. Following their series win, the trio were praised for their forechecking skills and ability to "chip in with big goals." When the Lightning met the Boston Bruins in the Second Round, Coleman remained with Goodrow and Gourde. In Game 2, Coleman helped even the series at 1–1 by scoring two goals to lift the Lightning to a 4–3 overtime win. This was his first career multi-goal game in the playoffs and his first career multi-point game in the postseason. As the Lightning defeated the Bruins, Coleman averaging 15:15 of 5-on-5 time on ice per game and averaged 1:59 per game of shorthanded time. Following their win, Coleman was considered an underrated top performer who was instrumental in helping the team advance to the Eastern Conference Final. Various hockey pundits at the NHL Network suggested that the Lightning would win the Cup in part because of Coleman's grit and tenacity. After defeating the New York Islanders in size games, Coleman and the Lightning faced off against the Dallas Stars in the 2020 Stanley Cup Final. During the Finals, Coleman's third line held Dallas to one power play goal on 19 chances. Coleman scored the Lightning's second goal of Game 6 to lift the team to their second Stanley Cup in franchise history. He subsequently became the first born-and-raised player from Texas to win a Stanley Cup.

Following their Stanley Cup win, Coleman was reunited with Goodrow and Gourde in the shortened 2020–21 season. They began the season combining for six points through the Lightning's first two games to help them defeat the Chicago Blackhawks in back-to-back games. Their momentum was short-lived however as Coleman was placed on the NHL COVID-19 protocol list on January 18. During his time away, Coleman was replaced on the third line by Mathieu Joseph. While unable to play, Coleman trained at home to keep his cardio levels game ready. He was expected to return to the Lightning's lineup on January 21 but was named a healthy scratch after missing a team meeting. The trio of Gourde, Goodrow, and Coleman remained together until March. Early in March, Gourde was promoted to the second line and replaced by Tyler Johnson on the third line to allow Johnson to play his more natural center position. The line was an early success as both Coleman and Johnson ended their goalless slump in their first game together. With his new linemate, Coleman produced seven goals and 10 assists for 17 points through 33 games by April 5. However, to facilitate the elevation of the rookies Alex Barré-Boulet and Ross Colton, Johnson and Joseph were moved down to the fourth line and Gourde rejoined the third line. The trio remained a consistent pair on the Lightning's third line with a team-leading 404 minutes together. They also helped the Lightning keep their opponents to just 1.88 expected goals against per 60, which was 25 per cent stronger than the league average. Coleman trailed only Brayden Point in scoring chances at five-on-five during the regular season and was third in high-danger chances behind Point and linemate Gourde and Point.

==== Calgary Flames ====
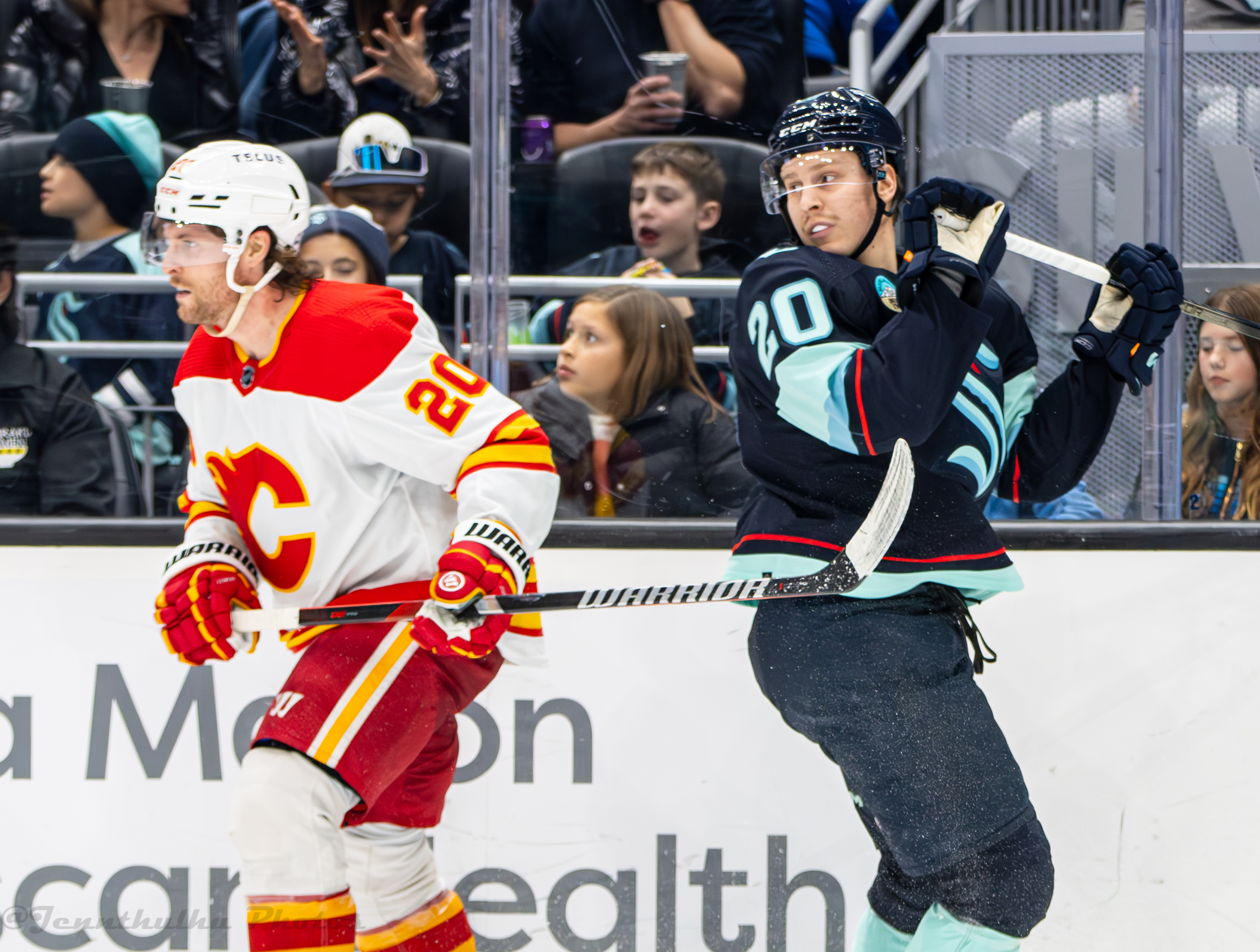
Coleman (left) with Eeli Tolvanen (right) during the 2023–24 season.

On July 28, 2021, as a free agent, Coleman left the Lightning and signed a six-year, $29.4 million contract with the Calgary Flames. During the preseason, Coleman often played alongside centre Elias Lindholm and Matthew Tkachuk on the left wing. In his second preseason game, Coleman received a minor penalty for boarding Winnipeg Jets forward Jansen Harkins and was later suspended from two games, including the Flames' season opener. As he missed the final pre-season game, Coleman finished the preseason with two assists while playing in a top-six role. Upon rejoining the lineup, Coleman was placed on a line with Mikael Backlund and Tyler Pitlick but the latter was replaced with Andrew Mangiapane in late November. However, while experiencing a 16-game goal drought, Coleman was moved to the Flames' third line with Sean Monahan and Trevor Lewis in early December. The line quickly developed chemistry and they combined for five points in their first game together on December 3. As his production increased, Coleman was reunited with Backlund and Pitlick in January and recorded career-highs in shots on net. By mid-January, Coleman tied with Alex Ovechkin for fifth in the NHL with 102 shots during five-on-five play.

On December 31, 2023, Coleman became the fourth Texas-born player to reach the 500-game milestone in the NHL when he skated in a game against the Flyers. During the game, he recorded two assists for his sixth multi-point game of the season. Coleman was recognized as the NHL's Second Star of the Week for the week ending January 14, 2024, after collecting four goals and three assists for seven points.

==== Minnesota Wild ====
On July 2, 2026, Coleman, alongside Olli Määttä, were traded to the Minnesota Wild in exchange for Jacob Middleton, a 2027 third round pick, a 2028 fourth round pick, and a 2029 second round pick. The Flames retained 50% of Coleman's salary.

== Personal life ==
In 2018, Coleman launched the Pickles Pals program, a community platform to support the Salvation Army Boys and Girls Club of Newark Ironbound. The aim of the platform was to develop academic programs and provide kids with the resources needed to succeed in school. The name developed from a nickname Coleman received after he was caught sipping pickle juice in the penalty box.

Coleman married his fiancée Jordan Daigle in the summer of 2019. She was a Dallas Cowboys cheerleader and a college football sideline reporter with CBS. They have two children together, both girls.

== Career statistics ==
=== Regular season and playoffs ===
			Regular season					Playoffs
Season	Team	League	GP	G	A	Pts	PIM	GP	G	A	Pts	PIM
2006–07	Belle Tire 16U AAA	T1EHL	29	12	16	28	30	—	—	—	—	—
2008–09	Dallas Stars 18U AAA	T1EHL	46	21	24	45	120	—	—	—	—	—
2009–10	Tri-City Storm	USHL	22	2	10	12	32	—	—	—	—	—
2009–10	Indiana Ice	USHL	36	8	8	16	24	9	0	2	2	13
2010–11	Indiana Ice	USHL	59	34	58	92	72	5	2	2	4	10
2011–12	Miami RedHawks	CCHA	39	12	11	23	56	—	—	—	—	—
2012–13	Miami RedHawks	CCHA	40	9	10	19	56	—	—	—	—	—
2013–14	Miami RedHawks	NCHC	27	19	9	28	65	—	—	—	—	—
2014–15	Miami RedHawks	NCHC	37	20	17	37	99	—	—	—	—	—
2015–16	Albany Devils	AHL	14	4	3	7	19	—	—	—	—	—
2016–17	Albany Devils	AHL	52	19	20	39	56	4	0	1	1	6
2016–17	New Jersey Devils	NHL	23	1	1	2	27	—	—	—	—	—
2017–18	New Jersey Devils	NHL	79	13	12	25	50	5	2	0	2	4
2018–19	New Jersey Devils	NHL	78	22	14	36	71	—	—	—	—	—
2019–20	New Jersey Devils	NHL	57	21	10	31	40	—	—	—	—	—
2019–20	Tampa Bay Lightning	NHL	9	0	1	1	16	25	5	8	13	31
2020–21	Tampa Bay Lightning	NHL	55	14	17	31	37	23	3	8	11	22
2021–22	Calgary Flames	NHL	81	16	17	33	60	12	2	3	5	12
2022–23	Calgary Flames	NHL	82	18	20	38	54	—	—	—	—	—
2023–24	Calgary Flames	NHL	78	30	24	54	76	—	—	—	—	—
2024–25	Calgary Flames	NHL	82	15	24	39	36	—	—	—	—	—
2025–26	Calgary Flames	NHL	69	20	15	35	49	—	—	—	—	—
NHL totals			693	170	155	325	516	65	12	19	31	69

Medal record

Representing United States

Ice hockey

World Championships
Bronze medal – third place	2018 Denmark	

=== International ===
Year	Team	Event	Result	GP	G	A	Pts	PIM
2018	United States	WC	3rd place, bronze medalist(s)	10	1	1	2	8
Senior totals				10	1	1	2	8

== Awards and honors ==
Award	Year	Refs
USHL
First All-Star Team	2011	
Forward of the Year	2011	
Player of the Year	2011	
Dave Tyler Junior Player of the Year	2011	
NCAA
NCHC All-Tournament Team	2015	
NCHC Tournament MVP	2015	
NHL
Stanley Cup champion	2020, 2021	
Calgary Flames
J. R. "Bud" McCaig Award	2023	

Awards and achievements
Preceded by Daniel Doremus	NCHC Tournament MVP; 2015	Succeeded by Mikey Eyssimont
