= Jordan Oesterle =

American ice hockey player (born 1992)

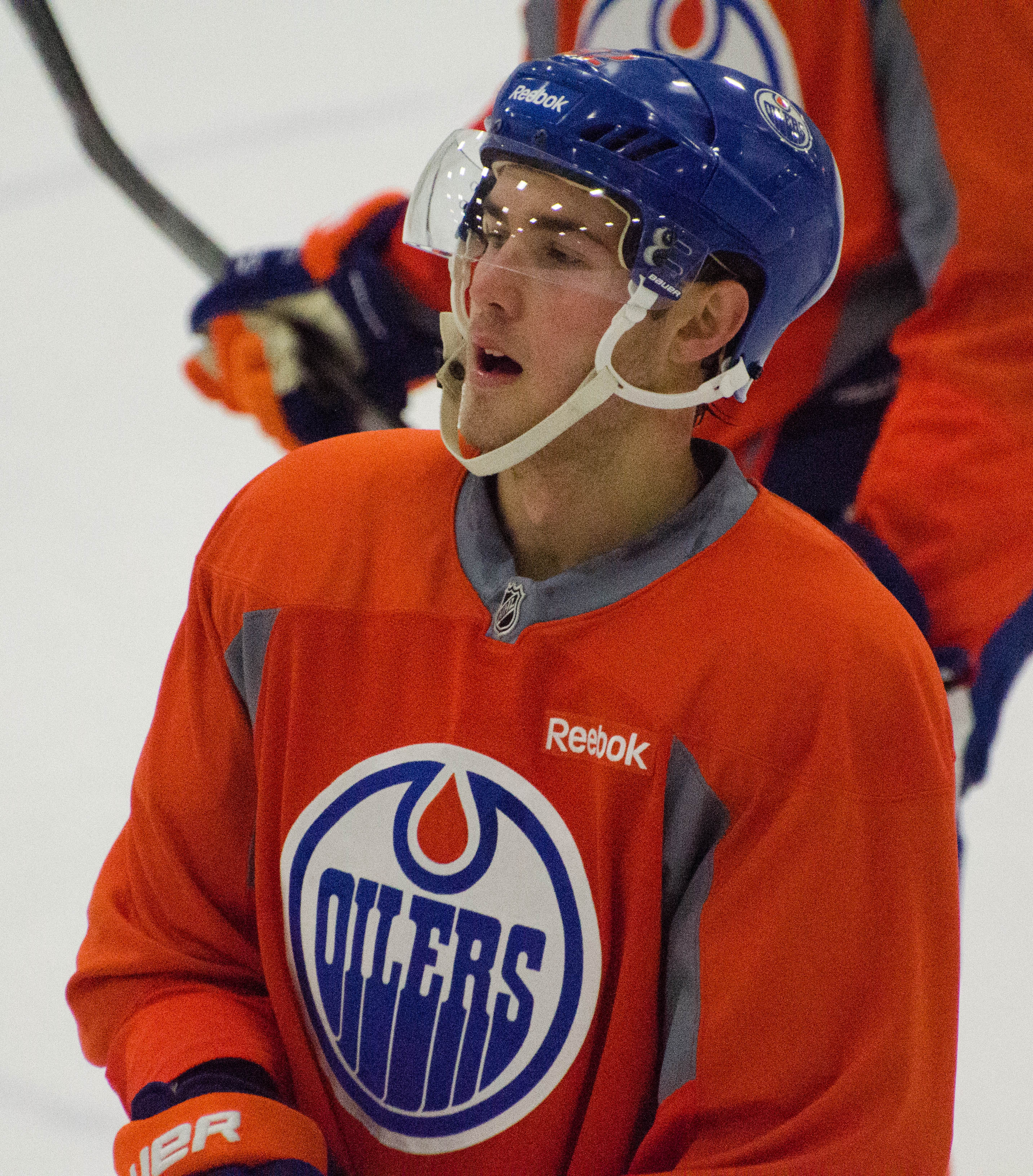
- Oesterle with the Edmonton Oilers in 2014
- Born: June 25, 1992 (age 34) Dearborn Heights, Michigan, U.S.
- Height: 6 ft 0 in (183 cm)
- Weight: 185 lb (84 kg; 13 st 3 lb)
- Position: Defense
- Shot: Left
- Played for: Edmonton Oilers; Chicago Blackhawks; Arizona Coyotes; Detroit Red Wings; Calgary Flames; Boston Bruins; Nashville Predators
- National team: United States
- NHL draft: Undrafted
- Playing career: 2014–2026

Jordan Oesterle (/ˈoʊstərli/ OH-stər-lee; born June 25, 1992) is a retired American professional ice hockey defenseman who played in the National Hockey League (NHL) for the Edmonton Oilers, Chicago Blackhawks, Arizona Coyotes, Detroit Red Wings, Calgary Flames, Boston Bruins, and Nashville Predators. He played college ice hockey for Western Michigan.

== Early life ==
Oesterle was born on June 25, 1992, in Dearborn Heights, Michigan, U.S. He attended Divine Child High School located in Dearborn, Michigan in 2010.

== Playing career ==
=== Collegiate ===
Undrafted, Oesterle played collegiate hockey with the Western Michigan Broncos of the National Collegiate Hockey Conference (NCHC), from 2010 to 2014. On March 31, 2014, Oesterle signed a two-year entry-level contract with the Edmonton Oilers.

=== Professional ===
==== Edmonton Oilers ====
In his rookie professional season in 2014–15 season, Oesterle was initially re-assigned to AHL affiliate, the Oklahoma City Barons. He compiled 21 points in 49 games with the Barons before he received his first NHL recall on February 20, 2015. The following day he made his NHL debut with the Oilers in a game against the Anaheim Ducks.

==== Chicago Blackhawks ====
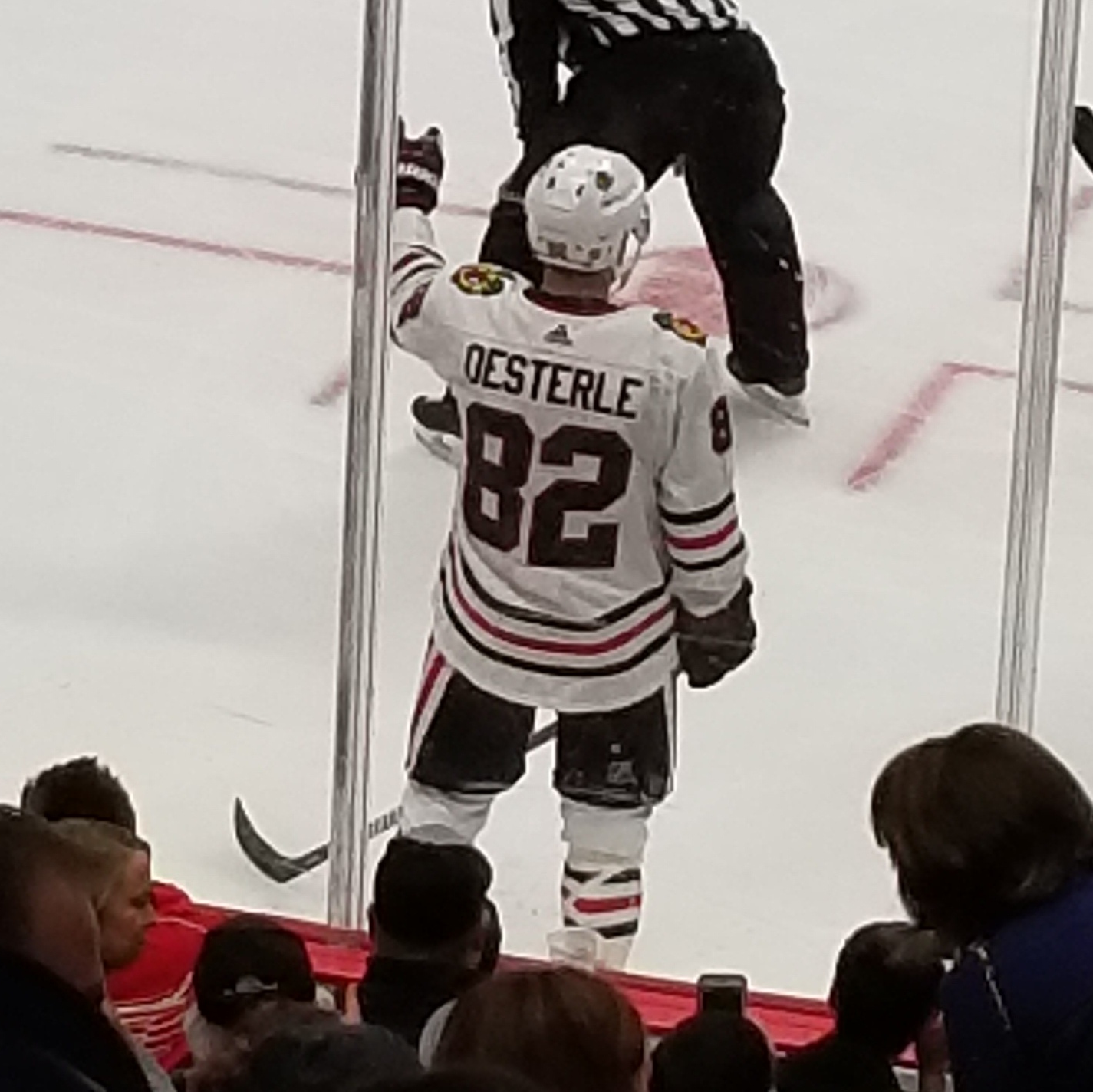
Oesterle with the Chicago Blackhawks in January 2018.

On July 1, 2017, having left the Oilers as a free agent, Oesterle agreed to a two-year contract with the Chicago Blackhawks. He endured a slow start to the season, playing in only four of the teams' first 29 games, before joining the lineup more permanently on December 10. Upon making his debut, Oesterle played on the left hand side with Connor Murphy on the right. As the season progressed, he played alongside veteran Duncan Keith which he said improved his confidence. On December 29, 2017, Oesterle scored his first career NHL goal against Cam Talbot of his former team, the Edmonton Oilers. As he remained on the Blackhawks roster for the entirety of the season, Oesterle established himself in a third-pairing role and recorded five goals and 10 assists over 55 games.

==== Arizona Coyotes ====
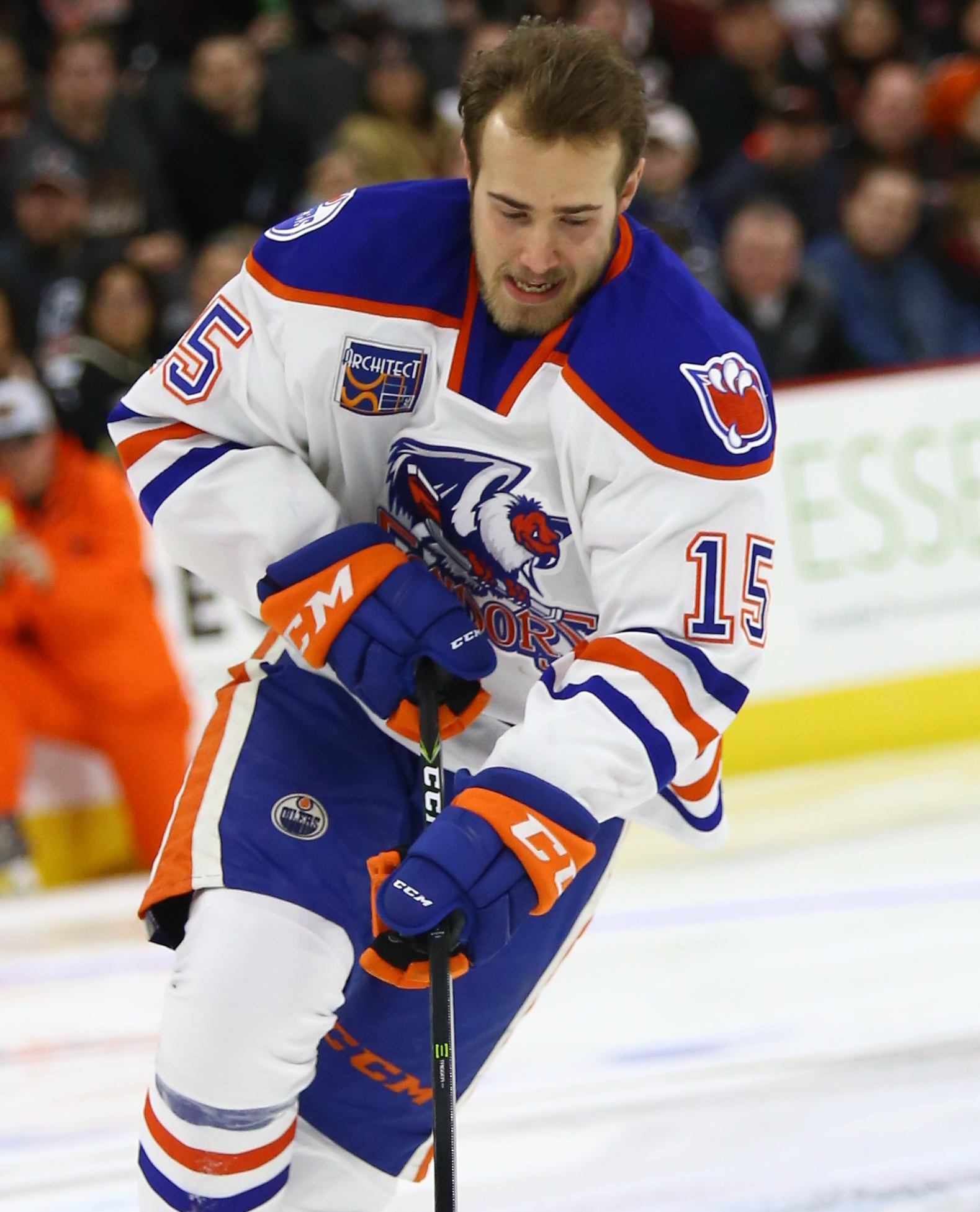
Oesterle with the Bakersfield Condors in 2017

On July 12, 2018, Oesterle was traded by the Blackhawks to the Arizona Coyotes along with the contract of Marián Hossa, Vinnie Hinostroza and a 2019 third-round pick, in exchange for Marcus Krüger, Jordan Maletta, Andrew Campbell, prospect MacKenzie Entwistle, and a 2019 fifth-round draft pick. This trade cleared up $8.5 million cap space for the Blackhawks. While playing with the Coyotes during the 2018–19 season, Oesterle alternated playing alongside Oliver Ekman-Larsson on the first blue-line pair and Ilya Lyubushkin or Jakob Chychrun on the third pair. In these roles, he registered a career-best six goals and 14 assists before being signed to a two-year contract through the 2020–21 season. By March, Oesterle was playing 19 minutes a night as the Coyotes fought for the second wild card spot in the Western Conference.

On October 19, 2019, Oesterle was placed on the Coyotes' long term injured reserve following an injury during a game against the Nashville Predators. He eventually re-entered the Coyotes lineup on November 9, after missing 10 games to recover.

==== Detroit Red Wings ====
On July 28, 2021, Oesterle signed a two-year $2.7 million contract with the Detroit Red Wings.

==== Calgary Flames ====
On July 2, 2023, Oesterle signed as a free agent to a one-year, $925,000 contract with the Calgary Flames. While in Calgary, Oesterle was assigned and recalled to and from the Calgary Wranglers of the American Hockey League.

==== Boston Bruins ====
After a lone season with the Flames, Oesterle continued his journeyman career in signing a two-year, two-way contract with the Boston Bruins on July 1, 2024.

==== Nashville Predators and retirement ====
On March 5, 2025, Oesterle was waived by the Bruins, and was subsequently claimed by the Nashville Predators the following day.

On July 13, 2026, as an unrestricted free agent, Oesterle announced his retirement from professional hockey after 12 years.

== International play ==
Medal record

Representing United States

Ice hockey

World Championships
Bronze medal – third place	2018 Denmark	

Following his breakout season with the Blackhawks in 2017-18, Oesterle was added to the United States roster to make his international debut at the 2018 IIHF World Championship in Denmark. Oesterle was the United States extra defenseman at the tournament and only appeared in one game, garnering one assist, in helping claim the bronze medal.

== Career statistics ==
=== Regular season and playoffs ===
			Regular season					Playoffs
Season	Team	League	GP	G	A	Pts	PIM	GP	G	A	Pts	PIM
2008–09	Belle Tire 16U AAA	T1EHL	31	5	15	20	10	—	—	—	—	—
2009–10	Belle Tire 18U AAA	T1EHL	47	5	25	30	42	—	—	—	—	—
2010–11	Sioux Falls Stampede	USHL	54	2	13	15	16	10	2	3	5	0
2011–12	Western Michigan University	CCHA	41	2	6	8	8	—	—	—	—	—
2012–13	Western Michigan University	CCHA	38	3	6	9	14	—	—	—	—	—
2013–14	Western Michigan University	NCHC	34	2	15	17	27	—	—	—	—	—
2013–14	Oklahoma City Barons	AHL	4	1	0	1	2	1	0	0	0	0
2014–15	Oklahoma City Barons	AHL	65	8	17	25	8	10	1	3	4	8
2014–15	Edmonton Oilers	NHL	6	0	1	1	0	—	—	—	—	—
2015–16	Bakersfield Condors	AHL	44	4	21	25	10	—	—	—	—	—
2015–16	Edmonton Oilers	NHL	17	0	5	5	0	—	—	—	—	—
2016–17	Bakersfield Condors	AHL	44	7	25	32	10	—	—	—	—	—
2016–17	Edmonton Oilers	NHL	2	0	0	0	0	—	—	—	—	—
2017–18	Chicago Blackhawks	NHL	55	5	10	15	8	—	—	—	—	—
2018–19	Arizona Coyotes	NHL	71	6	14	20	12	—	—	—	—	—
2019–20	Arizona Coyotes	NHL	58	3	10	13	14	9	1	3	4	0
2020–21	Arizona Coyotes	NHL	43	1	10	11	10	—	—	—	—	—
2021–22	Detroit Red Wings	NHL	45	2	6	8	4	—	—	—	—	—
2022–23	Detroit Red Wings	NHL	52	2	9	11	19	—	—	—	—	—
2023–24	Calgary Flames	NHL	22	0	2	2	4	—	—	—	—	—
2023–24	Calgary Wranglers	AHL	30	2	17	19	4	6	0	1	1	2
2024–25	Providence Bruins	AHL	9	3	5	8	0	—	—	—	—	—
2024–25	Boston Bruins	NHL	22	1	5	6	2	—	—	—	—	—
2024–25	Nashville Predators	NHL	15	3	1	4	2	—	—	—	—	—
2025–26	Milwaukee Admirals	AHL	69	14	32	46	33	3	0	2	2	2
2025–26	Nashville Predators	NHL	1	0	0	0	0	—	—	—	—	—
NHL totals			409	23	73	96	75	9	1	3	4	0

=== International ===
Year	Team	Event	Result	GP	G	A	Pts	PIM
2018	United States	WC	3rd place, bronze medalist(s)	1	0	1	1	0
Senior totals				1	0	1	1	0
