= 2010–11 USHL season =

2010-11 USHL season
- League: United States Hockey League
- Sport: Ice hockey
- Duration: October 1, 2010 – May 21, 2011
- Games: 60
- Teams: 16

Draft
- Top draft pick: Adam Krause
- Picked by: Chicago Steel

Regular season
- Anderson Cup: Cedar Rapids Roughriders
- Season MVP: Blake Coleman (Indiana Ice)
- Top scorer: Blake Coleman (Indiana Ice)

Playoffs
- Playoffs MVP: Mike Szmatula (Fighting Saints)
- Finals champions: Dubuque Fighting Saints
- Runners-up: Green Bay Gamblers

USHL seasons
- 2009–10 2011–12

The 2010–11 USHL season is the 32nd season of the United States Hockey League as an all-junior league. The regular season began on October 1, 2010, and concluded on April 9, 2011, with the regular season champion winning the Anderson Cup. The 2010–11 season was the first to include the Dubuque Fighting Saints and Muskegon Lumberjacks, both of whom were resurrected franchises of the same name (USHL and IHL respectively)

The Clark Cup playoffs featured the top six teams from each conference competing for the league title. The increase to twelve teams resulted from the addition of four teams in two years.

== Regular season ==
Current standings as of November 7, 2010

Note: GP = Games played; W = Wins; L = Losses; OTL = Overtime losses; SL = Shootout losses; GF = Goals for; GA = Goals against; PTS = Points; x = clinched playoff berth; y = clinched division title; z = clinched conference title

=== Eastern Conference ===
| Team | GP | W | L | OTL | PTS | GF | GA |
|---|---|---|---|---|---|---|---|
| yCedar Rapids RoughRiders | 60 | 42 | 12 | 6 | 90 | 212 | 151 |
| xGreen Bay Gamblers | 60 | 41 | 15 | 4 | 86 | 189 | 131 |
| xIndiana Ice | 60 | 37 | 19 | 4 | 78 | 237 | 166 |
| xUS NTDP | 60 | 30 | 25 | 5 | 65 | 170 | 172 |
| xMuskegon Lumberjacks | 60 | 24 | 28 | 8 | 56 | 187 | 235 |
| xWaterloo Black Hawks | 60 | 24 | 29 | 7 | 55 | 164 | 183 |
| Youngstown Phantoms | 60 | 23 | 30 | 7 | 53 | 167 | 205 |
| Chicago Steel | 60 | 9 | 43 | 8 | 26 | 103 | 248 |

=== Western Conference ===
| Team | GP | W | L | OTL | PTS | GF | GA |
|---|---|---|---|---|---|---|---|
| yDubuque Fighting Saints | 60 | 37 | 14 | 9 | 83 | 195 | 152 |
| xOmaha Lancers | 60 | 34 | 19 | 7 | 75 | 170 | 144 |
| xSioux Falls Stampede | 60 | 34 | 20 | 6 | 74 | 197 | 168 |
| xFargo Force | 60 | 33 | 22 | 5 | 71 | 173 | 151 |
| xLincoln Stars | 60 | 33 | 22 | 5 | 71 | 195 | 188 |
| xSioux City Musketeers | 60 | 31 | 23 | 6 | 68 | 174 | 167 |
| Des Moines Buccaneers | 60 | 29 | 25 | 6 | 64 | 174 | 177 |
| Tri-City Storm | 60 | 19 | 30 | 11 | 49 | 137 | 206 |

== Players ==
=== Scoring leaders ===
Note: GP = Games played; G = Goals; A = Assists; Pts = Points; PIM = Penalty minutes

| Player | Team | GP | G | A | Pts | PIM |
|---|---|---|---|---|---|---|
| Blake Coleman | Indiana Ice | 59 | 34 | 58 | 92 | 72 |
| Daniil Tarasov | Indiana Ice | 57 | 37 | 38 | 75 | 46 |
| Brian Ferlin | Indiana Ice | 55 | 25 | 48 | 73 | 26 |
| Johnny Gaudreau | Dubuque Fighting Saints | 60 | 36 | 36 | 72 | 36 |
| Ryan Dzingel | Lincoln Stars | 54 | 23 | 44 | 67 | 8 |
| Vinny Saponari | Dubuque Fighting Saints | 56 | 18 | 46 | 64 | 35 |
| Jimmy Mullin | Fargo Force | 52 | 23 | 37 | 60 | 26 |
| Justin Kovacs | Cedar Rapids RoughRiders | 58 | 17 | 42 | 59 | 20 |
| Jayson Megna | Cedar Rapids RoughRiders | 60 | 30 | 28 | 58 | 45 |
| David Johnstone | Indiana Ice | 57 | 20 | 38 | 58 | 32 |
| Ryan Misiak | Muskegon Lumberjacks | 57 | 15 | 43 | 58 | 44 |

=== Leading goaltenders ===
Note: GP = Games played; Mins = Minutes played; W = Wins; L = Losses: OTL = Overtime losses; SL = Shootout losses; GA = Goals Allowed; SO = Shutouts; GAA = Goals against average

| Player | Team | GP | Mins | W | L | OTL | GA | SO | Sv% | GAA |
|---|---|---|---|---|---|---|---|---|---|---|
| Ryan McKay | Green Bay Gamblers | 38 | 2216 | 25 | 9 | 3 | 74 | 5 | 0.928 | 2.00 |
| Matt Morris | Dubuque Fighting Saints | 37 | 1990 | 23 | 8 | 4 | 72 | 4 | 0.921 | 2.17 |
| Adam Wilcox | Green Bay Gamblers | 24 | 1420 | 16 | 6 | 1 | 52 | 1 | 0.922 | 2.20 |
| Brady Hjelle | Cedar Rapids RoughRiders | 53 | 3231 | 40 | 8 | 5 | 119 | 5 | 0.923 | 2.21 |
| Todd Mathews | Omaha Lancers | 34 | 1910 | 18 | 9 | 4 | 71 | 3 | 0.919 | 2.23 |
| Zane Gothberg | Fargo Force | 23 | 1318 | 13 | 8 | 0 | 49 | 2 | 0.918 | 2.23 |
| John Keneey | Omaha Lancers | 30 | 1612 | 15 | 9 | 3 | 60 | 1 | 0.908 | 2.23 |

== Clark Cup Playoffs ==
Conference Quarter-finals | Conference Semi-finals
1 | Cedar Rapids
- | Bye
1 | Cedar Rapids | 3
5 | Muskegon | 1
4 | US NTDP | 0
5 | Muskegon | 2
Eastern Conference
3 | Indiana | 2
6 | Waterloo | 0
2 | Green Bay | 3
3 | Indiana | 0
2 | Green Bay
- | Bye
1 | Dubuque
- | Bye
1 | Dubuque | 3
4 | Fargo | 0
4 | Fargo | 2
5 | Lincoln | 0
Western Conference
3 | Sioux Falls | 2
6 | Sioux City | 1
3 | Sioux Falls | 3
2 | Omaha | 0
2 | Omaha
- | Bye

Conference Finals
1 | Cedar Rapids | 1
2 | Green Bay | 3
1 | Dubuque | 3
3 | Sioux Falls | 1

Clark Cup Championship
E2 | Green Bay | 1
W1 | Dubuque | 3

== Conference Quarterfinals ==
=== Eastern Conference ===
==== (3) Indiana Ice vs. (6) Waterloo Black Hawks ====
| April 14 | Indiana Ice | 4 – 0 | Waterloo Black Hawks | Pepsi Coliseum |
| No scoring | | First period | No scoring |
| 7:59 - Dan Cesarz (1); 15:37 - Brian Ferlin (1); 17:53 - David Johnstone (1) | | Second period | No scoring |
| 18:06 - pp - Blake Coleman (1) | | Third period | No scoring |
| Casey DeSmith (38 saves / 38 shots) | | Goalie stats | C.J. Motte (30 saves / 34 shots) |

| April 15 | Indiana Ice | 6 – 3 | Waterloo Black Hawks | Pepsi Coliseum |
| 16:52 - Sean Kuraly (1); 18:28 - Alex Barron (1) | | First period | No scoring |
| 13:34 - pp - Blake Coleman (2); 14:50 - pp - David Johnstone (2) | | Second period | Aaron Pearce (1) - 2:57; Tyler Zepeda (1) - pp - 16:04 |
| 2:24 - Dan Cesarz (2); 15:11 - pp - Daniil Tarasov (1) | | Third period | Jacob MacDonald (1) - 13:34 |
| Casey DeSmith (27 saves / 30 shots) | | Goalie stats | C.J. Motte (7 saves / 9 shots); Jay Williams (20 saves / 24 shots) |

| Indiana wins series 2 – 0 |

==== (4) Team USA vs. (5) Muskegon Lumberjacks ====
| April 15 | Team USA | 0 – 2 | Muskegon Lumberjacks | Ann Arbor Ice Cube |
| No scoring | | First period | No scoring |
| No scoring | | Second period | No scoring |
| No scoring | | Third period | Matthew DeBlouw (1) - 5:36; Casey Thrush (1) - en - 19:26 |
| Jared Rutledge (25 saves / 26 shots) | | Goalie stats | Joel Vienneau (34 saves / 34 shots) |

| April 16 | Team USA | 2 – 5 | Muskegon Lumberjacks | Ann Arbor Ice Cube |
| No scoring | | First period | Charlie Taft (1) - 11:08; Matthew DeBlouw (2) - 11:54 |
| No scoring | | Second period | Matt Berry (1) - 12:36; Alexx Privitera (1) - pp - 19:59 |
| 6:36 - Ryan Hartman (1); 7:54 - Frank Vatrano (1) | | Third period | Matt Berry (2) - 4:26 |
| Jared Rutledge (14 saves / 18 shots); Collin Olson (4 saves / 5 shots) | | Goalie stats | Joel Vienneau (28 saves / 30 shots) |

| Muskegon wins series 2 – 0 |

=== Western Conference ===
==== (3) Sioux Falls Stampede vs. (6) Sioux City Musketeers ====
| April 13 | Sioux Falls Stampede | 5 – 1 | Sioux City Musketeers | Sioux Falls Arena |
| 11:44 - pp - Christian Isackson (1) | | First period | No scoring |
| 5:35 - pp - Brent Darnell (1); 6:32 - Christian Isackson (2) | | Second period | Alex Velischek (1) - 11:30 |
| 7:47 - Kyle Rau (1); 19:30 - en - Joseph Lordo (1) | | Third period | No scoring |
| Stephon Williams (27 saves / 28 shots) | | Goalie stats | Matt Skoff (37 saves / 41 shots) |

| April 14 | Sioux Falls Stampede | 4 – 3 | OT | Sioux City Musketeers | Sioux Falls Arena |
| 6:44 - pp - Connor Reilly (1) | | First period | | Ryan Carpenter (1) - 11:18 |
| No scoring | | Second period | | Richard Zehnal (1) - 11:08 |
| 0:41 - Christian Isackson (3); 9:09 - Joseph Lordo (2) | | Third period | | Max McCormick (1) - 8:23 |
| No scoring | | First overtime period | | Brett Patterson (1) - 9:48 |
| Stephon Williams (27 saves / 31 shots) | | Goalie stats | | Matt Skoff (45 saves / 48 shots) |

| April 17 | Sioux Falls Stampede | 5 – 3 | Sioux City Musketeers | Sioux Falls Arena |
| No scoring | | First period | Brad Robbins (1) - pp - 12:59 |
| Marcus Perrier (1) - pp - 1:49; Kyle Rau (2) - pp - 16:04; Nolan Youngmun (1) - 18:39 | | Second period | Tommy Olczyk (1) - 0:25; Ryan Carpenter (2) - 19:14 |
| Kyle Rau (3) - pp - 14:47; Ryan Jacobson (1) - en - 18:27 | | Third period | No scoring |
| Stephon Williams (19 saves / 22 shots) | | Goalie stats | Matt Skoff (30 saves / 34 shots) |

| Sioux Falls wins series 2 – 1 |

==== (4) Fargo Force vs. (5) Lincoln Stars ====
| April 15 | Fargo Force | 2 – 0 | Lincoln Stars | Scheels Arena |
| No scoring | | First period | No scoring |
| No scoring | | Second period | No scoring |
| 16:05 - Brian Cooper (1); 19:11 - en - Joe Rehkamp (1) | | Third period | No scoring |
| Ryan Massa (23 saves / 23 shots) | | Goalie stats | Kevin Murdock (29 saves / 30 shots) |

| April 16 | Fargo Force | 4 – 2 | Lincoln Stars | Scheels Arena |
| 12:21 - pp - Tanner Kero (1) | | First period | Ryan Dzingel (1) - pp - 13:07 |
| 0:42 - Colten St. Clair (1) | | Second period | No scoring |
| 11:29 - Joe Rehkamp (2); 19:52 - en - Brian Cooper (2) | | Third period | Rasmus Juell (1) - 4:26 |
| Ryan Massa (20 saves / 22 shots) | | Goalie stats | Kevin Murdock (40 saves / 43 shots) |

| Fargo wins series 2 – 0 |

== Conference semifinals ==
=== Eastern Conference ===
==== (1) Cedar Rapids RoughRiders vs. (5) Muskegon Lumberjacks ====
| April 20 | Cedar Rapids RoughRiders | 4 – 1 | Muskegon Lumberjacks | Cedar Rapids Ice Arena |
| 19:22 - Ryan McGrath (1) | | First period | Brendan Woods (1) - pp - 18:31 |
| 15:11 - Jayson Megna (1) | | Second period | No scoring |
| 2:25 - Jayson Megna (2); 14:11 - pp - Stu Wilson (1) | | Third period | No scoring |
| Brady Hjelle (20 saves / 21 shots) | | Goalie stats | Joel Vienneau (28 saves / 32 shots) |

| April 22 | Cedar Rapids RoughRiders | 6 – 1 | Muskegon Lumberjacks | Cedar Rapids Ice Arena |
| No scoring | | First period | No scoring |
| 5:14 - Cason Hohmann (1); 13:42 - Sam Warning (1); 15:49 - Jayson Megna (3) | | Second period | No scoring |
| 5:18 - Justin Kovacs (1); 11:39 - Peter Maric (1); 16:47 - Michael Parks (1) | | Third period | Matt Berry (3) - 3:43 |
| Brady Hjelle (25 saves / 26 shots) | | Goalie stats | Joel Vienneau (39 saves / 44 shots); Paul Berrafato (2 saves / 3 shots) |

| April 23 | Muskegon Lumberjacks | 5 – 1 | Cedar Rapids RoughRiders | L.C. Walker Arena |
| No scoring | | First period | Jayson Megna (4) - pp - 3:19 |
| 12:30 - Jordan Masters (1); 15:00 - Ryan Misiak (1); 18:18 - Matt Berry (4) | | Second period | No scoring |
| 7:35 - Charlie Taft (2); 15:25 - Travis Belohrad (1) | | Third period | No scoring |
| Joel Vienneau (25 saves / 26 shots) | | Goalie stats | Brady Hjelle (34 saves / 39 shots) |

| April 25 | Muskegon Lumberjacks | 3 – 7 | Cedar Rapids RoughRiders | L.C. Walker Arena |
| No scoring | | First period | Michael Parks (2) - 1:04; Peter Maric (2) - 3:55 |
| 2:40 - Matthew DeBlouw (3); 9:13 - Casey Thrush (2) | | Second period | Nick Saracino (1) - 11:34 |
| 13:57 - pp - John Parker (1) | | Third period | Justin Kovacs (2) - 0:24; Sam Warning (2) - 6:19; Sam Warning (3) - pp - 11:58; Stu Wilson (2) - pp - en - 19:58 |
| Joel Vienneau (28 saves / 34 shots) | | Goalie stats | Brady Hjelle (33 saves / 36 shots) |

| Cedar Rapids wins series 3 – 1 |

==== (2) Green Bay Gamblers vs. (3) Indiana Ice ====
| April 20 | Green Bay Gamblers | 5 – 1 | Indiana Ice | Resch Center |
| 2:58 - Sam Herr (1); 5:09 - Austin Czarnik (1); 13:34 - Will Kessel (1) | | First period | Daniil Tarasov (2) - 5:54 |
| 0:32 - sh - Austin Czarnik (2); 18:18 - Andy Welinski (1) | | Second period | No scoring |
| No scoring | | Third period | No scoring |
| Ryan McKay (15 saves / 16 shots) | | Goalie stats | Casey DeSmith (26 saves / 31 shots); Jon Gillies (13 saves / 13 shots) |

| April 22 | Green Bay Gamblers | 3 – 1 | Indiana Ice | Resch Center |
| 6:09 - Andy Welinski (2) | | First period | Peter Schneider (1) - 2:44 |
| No scoring | | Second period | No scoring |
| 10:36 - Grant Arnold (1); 16:27 - pp - Aaron Harstad (1) | | Third period | No scoring |
| Ryan McKay (20 saves / 21 shots) | | Goalie stats | Jon Gillies (28 saves / 31 shots) |

| April 23 | Indiana Ice | 1 – 2 | OT | Green Bay Gamblers | Pepsi Coliseum |
| No scoring | | First period | | No scoring |
| 0:36 - David Johnstone (3) | | Second period | | Ludwig Karlsson (1) - pp - 14:48 |
| No scoring | | Third period | | No scoring |
| No scoring | | First overtime period | | Austin Czarnik (3) - 10:16 |
| Casey DeSmith (39 saves / 41 shots) | | Goalie stats | | Adam Wilcox (30 saves / 31 shots) |

| Green Bay wins series 3 – 0 |

=== Western Conference ===
==== (1) Dubuque Fighting Saints vs. (4) Fargo Force ====
| April 20 | Dubuque Fighting Saints | 2 – 1 | OT | Fargo Force | Mystique Ice Center |
| No scoring | | First period | | No scoring |
| 15:18 - pp - Joakim Ryan (1) | | Second period | | No scoring |
| No scoring | | Third period | | Dan Weissenhofer (1) - 17:26 |
| 5:57 - pp - Nick Luukko (1) | | First overtime period | | No scoring |
| Matt Morris (20 saves / 21 shots) | | Goalie stats | | Ryan Massa (18 saves / 20 shots) |

| April 22 | Dubuque Fighting Saints | 2 – 1 | Fargo Force | Mystique Ice Center |
| No scoring | | First period | Garrett Haar (1) - 14:49 |
| 10:00 - Johnny Gaudreau (1); 16:39 - Shane Sooth (1) | | Second period | No scoring |
| No scoring | | Third period | No scoring |
| Matt Morris (25 saves / 26 shots) | | Goalie stats | Ryan Massa (26 saves / 28 shots) |

| April 23 | Fargo Force | 0 – 3 | Dubuque Fighting Saints | Scheels Arena |
| No scoring | | First period | Zemgus Girgensons (1) - pp - 3:07; Vinny Saponari (1) - 5:07 |
| No scoring | | Second period | Riley Barber (1) - 14:14 |
| No scoring | | Third period | No scoring |
| Zane Gothberg (16 saves / 19 shots) | | Goalie stats | Matt Morris (29 saves / 29 shots) |

| Dubuque wins series 3 – 0 |

==== (2) Omaha Lancers vs. (3) Sioux Falls Stampede ====
| April 20 | Omaha Lancers | 2 – 5 | Sioux Falls Stampede | Omaha Civic Auditorium |
| No scoring | | First period | Nolan Youngmun (2) - 1:37 |
| 5:36 - Ryan Daugherty (1) | | Second period | Joseph Lordo (3) - 12:27; Ryan Jacobson (2) - 13:16; Connor Reilly (2) - 14:35 |
| 19:03 - Ryan Daugherty (2) | | Third period | Dominic Zombo (1) - sh - 2:57 |
| Todd Mathews (19 saves / 22 shots); John Keeney (9 saves / 11 shots) | | Goalie stats | Stephon Williams (26 saves / 28 shots) |

| April 22 | Omaha Lancers | 3 – 4 | Sioux Falls Stampede | Omaha Civic Auditorium |
| 14:03 - Aaron Ave (1) | | First period | Jordan Oesterle (1) - 13:08 |
| No scoring | | Second period | Connor Reilly (3) - pp - 10:53 |
| 11:45 - pp - Anthony Hamburg (1); 19:49 - Seth Ambroz (1) | | Third period | Connor Reilly (4) - 1:39; Kyle Rau (4) - en - 19:06 |
| Todd Mathews (25 saves / 28 shots) | | Goalie stats | Juho Olkinuora (30 saves / 33 shots) |

| April 23 | Sioux Falls Stampede | 5 – 1 | Omaha Lancers | Sioux Falls Arena |
| 12:54 - Clark Cristofoli (1) | | First period | Seth Ambroz (2) - 11:49 |
| 0:34 - Daniel Doremus (1); 5:49 - Kyle Rau (5); 7:38 - Kyle Rau (6); 8:39 - sh - Sam Coatta (1) | | Second period | No scoring |
| No scoring | | Third period | No scoring |
| Stephon Williams (34 saves / 35 shots) | | Goalie stats | Todd Mathews (16 saves / 19 shots); John Keeney (14 saves / 16 shots) |

| Sioux Falls wins series 3 – 0 |

== Conference finals ==
=== Eastern Conference ===
==== (1) Cedar Rapids Roughriders vs. (2) Green Bay Gamblers ====
| April 29 | Cedar Rapids Roughriders | 2–3 | Green Bay Gamblers | Cedar Rapids Ice Arena |
| 14:28 - Tanner Pond (1) | | First period | Nolan LaPorte (1) - 6:31; Nolan LaPorte (2) - 9:57 |
| No scoring | | Second period | Ludwig Karlsson (2) - 19:00 |
| Ryan McGrath (2) - 16:05 | | Third period | No scoring |
| Brady Hjelle (28 saves / 31 shots) | | Goalie stats | Ryan McKay (24 saves / 26 shots) |

| April 30 | Cedar Rapids Roughriders | 2–1 | Green Bay Gamblers | Cedar Rapids Ice Arena |
| 6:07 - Nick Saracino (2) | | First period | No scoring |
| 16:55 - pp - Sam Warning (4) | | Second period | C.J. Eick (1) - 1:56 |
| No scoring | | Third period | No scoring |
| Brady Hjelle (19 saves / 20 shots) | | Goalie stats | Ryan McKay (32 saves / 34 shots) |

| May 6 | Green Bay Gamblers | 4–1 | Cedar Rapids Roughriders | Resch Center |
| 5:38 - Alex Broadhurst (1) | | First period | No scoring |
| 13:52 - C.J. Eick (2); 17:55 - Nolan LaPorte (3) | | Second period | Michael Parks (3) - 5:15 |
| 12:20 - Aaron Harstad (2) | | Third period | No scoring |
| Ryan McKay (17 saves / 18 shots) | | Goalie stats | Brady Hjelle (32 saves / 36 shots) |

| May 8 | Green Bay Gamblers | 3–1 | Cedar Rapids Roughriders | Resch Center |
| 5:58 - pp - J.P. LaFontaine (1); 6:56 - David Goodwin (1) | | First period | No scoring |
| No scoring | | Second period | Nick Saracino (3) - 8:28 |
| 19:11 - en - Robert Francis (1) | | Third period | No scoring |
| Ryan McKay (19 saves / 20 shots) | | Goalie stats | Brady Hjelle (30 saves / 32 shots) |

| Green Bay wins series 3 – 1 |

=== Western Conference ===
==== (1) Dubuque Fighting Saints vs. (3) Sioux Falls Stampede ====
| April 29 | Dubuque Fighting Saints | 5–2 | Sioux Falls Stampede | Mystique Ice Center |
| 17:21 - pp - Zemgus Girgensons (2) | | First period | Kyle Rau (7) - 7:09 |
| 16:08 - pp - Tony Larson (1); 18:29 - pp - Vinny Saponari (2) | | Second period | Bryan Moore (1) - pp - 1:22 |
| 15:09 - T.J. Moor (1); 18:46 - en - Vinny Saponari (3) | | Third period | No scoring |
| Matt Morris (18 saves / 20 shots) | | Goalie stats | Stephon Williams (27 saves / 31 shots) |

| April 30 | Dubuque Fighting Saints | 2–1 | Sioux Falls Stampede | Mystique Ice Center |
| No scoring | | First period | No scoring |
| 18:11 - Johnny Gaudreau (2) | | Second period | Daniel Doremus (2) - pp - 14:26 |
| 15:50 - Johnny Gaudreau (3) | | Third period | No scoring |
| Matt Morris (26 saves / 27 shots) | | Goalie stats | Juho Olkinuora (28 saves / 30 shots) |

| May 6 | Sioux Falls Stampede | 3–2 | Dubuque Fighting Saints | Sioux Falls Arena |
| 14:04 - Jordan Oesterle (2) | | First period | Tony Larson (2) - pp - 12:28 |
| 5:28 - pp - Jordan Oesterle (3); 17:14 - Dominic Zombo (2) | | Second period | No scoring |
| No scoring | | Third period | John Doherty (1) - 9:44 |
| Juho Olkinuora (29 saves / 31 shots) | | Goalie stats | Matt Morris (25 saves / 28 shots) |

| May 8 | Sioux Falls Stampede | 2–3 | OT | Dubuque Fighting Saints | Sioux Falls Arena |
| No scoring | | First period | | Vinny Saponari (4) - pp - 17:31 |
| 0:25 - pp - Marcus Perrier (2); 17:50 - pp - Austyn Young (2) | | Second period | | Johnny Gaudreau (4) - 7:37 |
| No scoring | | Third period | | No scoring |
| No scoring | | First overtime period | | Zemgus Girgensons (3) - 2:38 |
| Juho Olkinuora (30 saves / 33 shots) | | Goalie stats | | Matt Morris (35 saves / 37 shots) |

| Dubuque wins series 3 – 1 |

== Clark Cup Finals ==
=== (W1) Dubuque Fighting Saints vs. (E2) Green Bay Gamblers ===
| May 13 | Green Bay Gamblers | 3–0 | Dubuque Fighting Saints | Resch Center |
| No scoring | | First period | No scoring |
| 2:01 - Jean-Paul LaFontaine (2) | | Second period | No scoring |
| 15:08 - Robert Francis (2); 16:00 - Alex Broadhurst (2) | | Third period | No scoring |
| Ryan McKay (23 saves / 23 shots) | | Goalie stats | Matt Morris (24 saves / 27 shots) |

| May 14 | Green Bay Gamblers | 1–2 | Dubuque Fighting Saints | Resch Center |
| No scoring | | First period | Vinny Saponari (5) - 4:11 |
| No scoring | | Second period | No scoring |
| 10:07 - Alex Broadhurst (3) | | Third period | Shane Sooth (2) - 9:58 |
| Ryan McKay (17 saves / 19 shots) | | Goalie stats | Matt Morris (23 saves / 24 shots) |

| May 20 | Dubuque Fighting Saints | 4–2 | Green Bay Gamblers | Mystique Ice Center |
| No scoring | | First period | Grant Arnold (2) - 16:38 |
| 10:12 - Tony Larson (3); 11:16- Joakim Ryan (2); 11:45 - Tyler Lundey (1) | | Second period | No scoring |
| 2:27 - Riley Barber (2) | | Third period | C.J. Eick (3) - 19:31 |
| Matt Morris (18 saves / 20 shots) | | Goalie stats | Ryan McKay (19 saves / 23 shots); Adam Wilcox (6 saves / 6 shots) |

| May 21 | Dubuque Fighting Saints | 6–1 | Green Bay Gamblers | Mystique Ice Center |
| No scoring | | First period | No scoring |
| 9:45 - Tyler Lundey (2); 12:57 - T.J. Schlueter (1) | | Second period | C.J. Eick (4) - 0:33 |
| 1:50 - pp - T.J. Schlueter (2); 13:38 - John Doherty (2); 16:24 - en - Johnny Gaudreau (5); 17:12 - Shane Walsh (1) | | Third period | No scoring |
| Matt Morris (37 saves / 38 shots) | | Goalie stats | Ryan McKay (29 saves / 34 shots) |

| Dubuque wins series 3 – 1 |

== Playoff scoring leaders ==
Note: GP = Games played; G = Goals; A = Assists; Pts = Points; PIM = Penalty minutes

| Player | Team | GP | G | A | Pts | PIM |
|---|---|---|---|---|---|---|
| Kyle Rau | Sioux Falls Stampede | 10 | 7 | 5 | 12 | 4 |
| Johnny Gaudreau | Dubuque Fighting Saints | 11 | 5 | 6 | 11 | 6 |
| Daniel Doremus | Sioux Falls Stampede | 10 | 2 | 9 | 11 | 8 |
| Vinny Saponari | Dubuque Fighting Saints | 11 | 5 | 4 | 9 | 6 |
| Alex Broadhurst | Green Bay Gamblers | 11 | 3 | 6 | 9 | 4 |
| Connor Reilly | Sioux Falls Stampede | 10 | 4 | 4 | 8 | 4 |
| Matthew DeBlouw | Muskegon Lumberjacks | 6 | 3 | 8 | 6 | |
| Christian Isackson | Sioux Falls Stampede | 10 | 3 | 5 | 8 | 8 |
| Zemgus Girgensons | Dubuque Fighting Saints | 11 | 3 | 5 | 8 | 8 |
| Nolan LaPorte | Green Bay Gamblers | 11 | 3 | 5 | 8 | 14 |
| Shane Sooth | Dubuque Fighting Saints | 11 | 2 | 6 | 8 | 2 |
| Cason Hohmann | Cedar Rapids RoughRiders | 8 | 1 | 7 | 8 | 4 |

== Playoff leading goaltenders ==
Note: GP = Games played; Mins = Minutes played; W = Wins; L = Losses; GA = Goals Allowed; SO = Shutouts; SV% = Save percentage; GAA = Goals against average

| Player | Team | GP | Mins | W | L | GA | SO | Sv% | GAA |
|---|---|---|---|---|---|---|---|---|---|
| Adam Wilcox | Green Bay Gamblers | 2 | 88 | 1 | 0 | 1 | 0 | 0.973 | 0.68 |
| Ryan Massa | Fargo Force | 4 | 244 | 2 | 2 | 6 | 1 | 0.935 | 1.48 |
| Matt Morris | Dubuque Fighting Saints | 11 | 668 | 9 | 2 | 17 | 1 | 0.943 | 1.53 |
| Ryan McKay | Green Bay Gamblers | 10 | 580 | 6 | 4 | 19 | 1 | 0.919 | 1.97 |
| Kevin Murdock | Lincoln Stars | 2 | 119 | 0 | 2 | 4 | 0 | 0.945 | 2.03 |

== All-Star teams ==
=== First Team ===
- Brady Hjelle (Goalie) Cedar Rapids RoughRiders
- Blake Coleman (Forward)Indiana Ice
- Jayson Megna (Forward) Cedar Rapids RoughRiders
- Jimmy Mullin (Forward) Fargo Force
- Nick Mattson (Defense) Indiana Ice
- Jordan Schmaltz (Defense) Sioux City Musketeers

=== Second Team ===
- Ryan McKay (Goalie) Green Bay Gamblers
- Matt Morris (Goalie) Dubuque Fighting Saints
- Daniil Tarasov (Forward) Indiana Ice
- John Gaudreau (Forward) Dubuque Fighting Saints
- Vinny Saponari (Forward) Dubuque Fighting Saints
- Brian Cooper (Defense) Fargo Force
- Ben Marshall (Defense) Omaha Lancers
