= Vinny Saponari =

American ice hockey winger (born 1990)

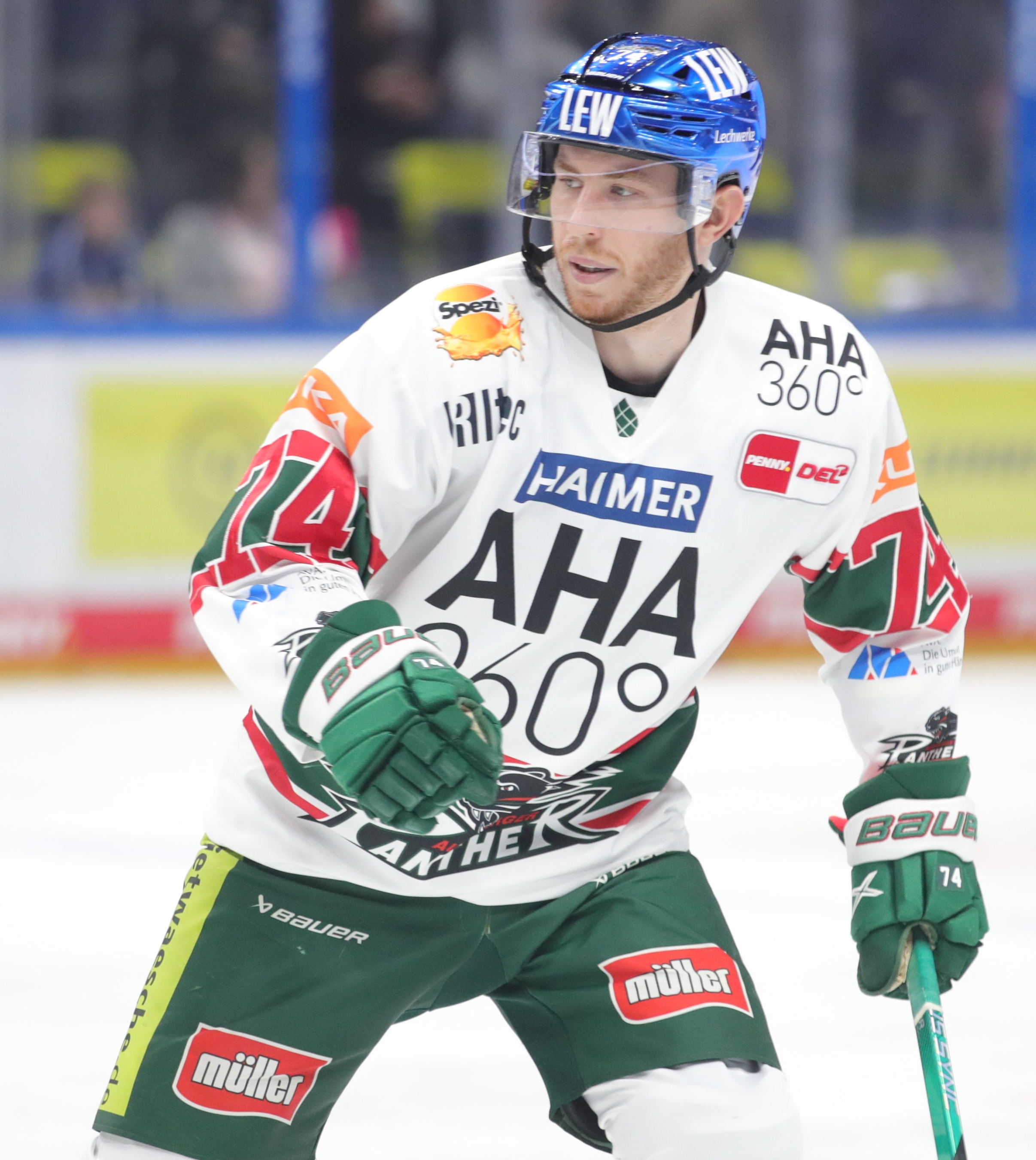
- Saponari in 2023
- Born: February 15, 1990 (age 36) Powder Springs, Georgia, U.S.
- Height: 6 ft 0 in (183 cm)
- Weight: 203 lb (92 kg; 14 st 7 lb)
- Position: Right wing
- Shoots: Right
- DEL2 team Former teams: Eispiraten Crimmitschau; St. John's IceCaps; Milwaukee Admirals; Hartford Wolf Pack; Portland Pirates; Lake Erie Monsters; Frisk Asker; HC Sparta Praha; Krefeld Pinguine; Augsburger Panther
- NHL draft: 94th overall, 2008; Atlanta Thrashers
- Playing career: 2013–present

Vinny Saponari (born February 15, 1990) is an American professional ice hockey right winger who is currently under contract with Eispiraten Crimmitschau of the DEL2.

== Playing career ==
Saponari was drafted 94th overall by the Atlanta Thrashers in the 2008 NHL entry draft from the USA Hockey National Team Development Program. After his draft selection, Saponari began playing for Boston University but was dismissed in 2010 along with his brother Victor. Following this, he spent a season in the United States Hockey League for the Dubuque Fighting Saints before returning to college hockey with two seasons at Northeastern University.

Saponari signed with the St. John's IceCaps of the American Hockey League at the tail-end of the 2012–13 season, playing in seven regular season games and scoring a goal and an assist. He signed with the Milwaukee Admirals of the AHL for the 2013–14 season in what would be his only consistent season in the league, playing fifty-eight games and scoring thirty-three points. Afterwards, he played predominantly in the ECHL over the next two seasons and only made brief appearances in the AHL for the Hartford Wolf Pack, Portland Pirates and the Lake Erie Monsters before returning to the Admirals for a brief spell there as well.

On September 10, 2016, Saponari left North America and signed for Frisk Asker of Norway's GET-ligaen. On May 15, 2017, he moved to the Czech Republic and signed for HC Sparta Praha of the Czech Extraliga, but only played fifteen games for the team before returning to Frisk Asker on December 3, 2017, for the remainder of the season. On July 22, 2018, Saponari signed with the Krefeld Pinguine of the Deutsche Eishockey Liga.

In the midst of his third season with Krefeld Pinguine in 2020–21, Saponari registered just 2 assists through 8 regular season contests before opting to mutually terminate his contract on February 1, 2021.

On June 1, 2021, Saponari returned to the DEL, signing an initial one-year deal with Augsburger Panther.

In his second year with Augsburg in the 2022–23 season, Saponari posted 3 goals and 15 points through 39 regular season games, however was unable to help prevent the Panthers finish in a relegation position. He left the club at the conclusion of his contract on March 17, 2023.

On June 13, 2023, Saponari opted to continue his career in Germany, joining second tier club, ETC Crimmitschau of the DEL2.

== Career statistics ==
=== Regular season and playoffs ===
			Regular season					Playoffs
Season	Team	League	GP	G	A	Pts	PIM	GP	G	A	Pts	PIM
2005–06	Culver Military Academy	USHS	42	16	37	53	24	—	—	—	—	—
2006–07	U.S. National Development Team	NAHL	35	9	10	19	43	—	—	—	—	—
2007–08	U.S. National Development Team	NAHL	15	1	7	8	0	—	—	—	—	—
2008–09	Boston University	HE	44	8	9	17	39	—	—	—	—	—
2009–10	Boston University	HE	38	12	18	30	32	—	—	—	—	—
2010–11	Dubuque Fighting Saints	USHL	56	18	46	64	35	11	5	4	9	6
2011–12	Northeastern University	HE	34	7	16	23	14	—	—	—	—	—
2012–13	Northeastern University	HE	34	7	22	29	24	—	—	—	—	—
2012–13	St. John's IceCaps	AHL	7	1	1	2	0	—	—	—	—	—
2013–14	Cincinnati Cyclones	ECHL	14	1	10	11	4	—	—	—	—	—
2013–14	Milwaukee Admirals	AHL	58	15	18	33	14	2	0	0	0	0
2014–15	Greenville Road Warriors	ECHL	68	18	51	69	16	—	—	—	—	—
2014–15	Hartford Wolf Pack	AHL	3	0	1	1	0	—	—	—	—	—
2015–16	Portland Pirates	AHL	6	1	3	4	6	—	—	—	—	—
2015–16	Lake Erie Monsters	AHL	1	0	0	0	0	—	—	—	—	—
2015–16	Greenville Swamp Rabbits	ECHL	40	6	11	17	12	—	—	—	—	—
2015–16	Milwaukee Admirals	AHL	11	0	3	3	0	—	—	—	—	—
2016–17	Frisk Asker	GET	43	15	36	51	14	17	7	14	21	36
2017–18	HC Sparta Praha	ELH	15	1	6	7	6	—	—	—	—	—
2017–18	Frisk Asker	GET	17	5	11	16	6	10	3	6	9	6
2018–19	Krefeld Pinguine	DEL	43	9	9	18	10	—	—	—	—	—
2019–20	Krefeld Pinguine	DEL	50	8	23	31	12	—	—	—	—	—
2020–21	Krefeld Pinguine	DEL	8	0	2	2	2	—	—	—	—	—
2020–21	Kassel Huskies	DEL2	20	4	19	23	4	11	5	8	13	2
2021–22	Augsburger Panther	DEL	46	12	12	24	16	—	—	—	—	—
2022–23	Augsburger Panther	DEL	39	3	12	15	14	—	—	—	—	—
DEL totals			186	32	58	90	54	—	—	—	—	—

=== International ===
Year	Team	Event	Result	GP	G	A	Pts	PIM
2007	United States	U18	2nd place, silver medalist(s)	7	2	2	4	0
2008	United States	U18	3rd place, bronze medalist(s)	7	0	3	3	33
Junior totals				14	2	5	7	33
