= Brian Cooper (ice hockey) =

American ice hockey player (born 1993)

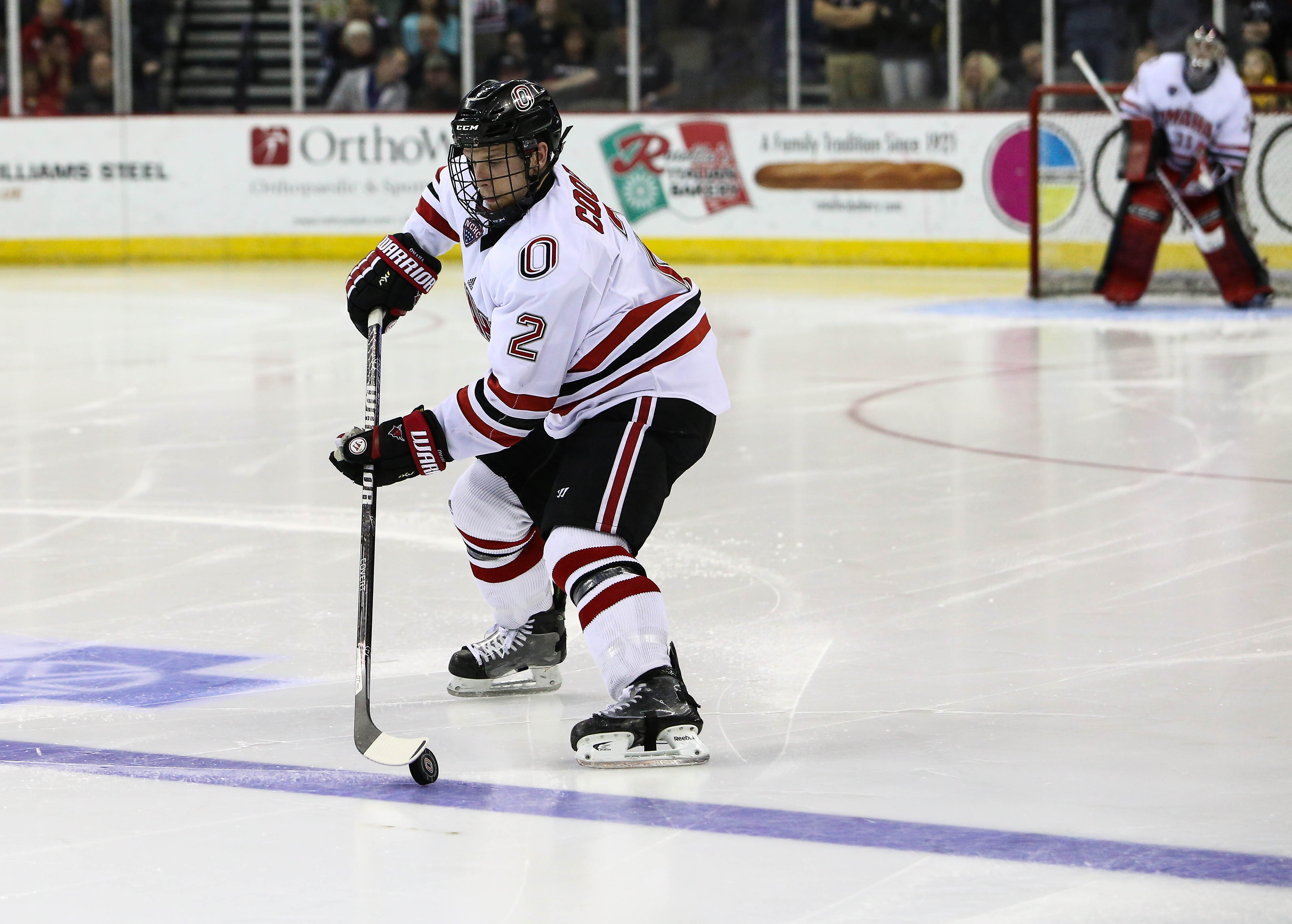
- Born: November 1, 1993 (age 32) Anchorage, Alaska, U.S.
- Height: 5 ft 10 in (178 cm)
- Weight: 196 lb (89 kg; 14 st 0 lb)
- Position: Defenseman
- Shoots: Left
- SHL team Former teams: Växjö Lakers; IK Oskarshamn
- National team: United States
- NHL draft: 127th overall, 2012; Anaheim Ducks
- Playing career: 2015–present

Brian Cooper (born November 1, 1993) is an American professional ice hockey defenseman for Växjö Lakers of the Swedish Hockey League (SHL)

== Playing career ==
Cooper was drafted in the fifth round, 127th overall, by the Anaheim Ducks in the 2012 NHL entry draft.

Following his collegiate career at Omaha, Cooper made his professional debut for the San Diego Gulls of the American Hockey League (AHL) during the 2015–16 season, where he recorded one assist in five games. On August 24, 2017, he signed a one-year contract extension with the Gulls. On July 10, 2018, he signed a one-year contract with the Milwaukee Admirals of the AHL.

On February 7, 2019, he signed with AIK IF of the HockeyAllsvenskan. On April 27, 2019, he signed with IF Björklöven.

On April 21, 2020, he signed with IK Oskarshamn of the SHL.

Following two seasons with Oskarshamn, Cooper left the club as a free agent and continued in the SHL with Växjö Lakers. He was signed to a two-year contract on 20 April 2022.

== International play ==
On January 13, 2022, Cooper was named to Team USA's roster to represent the United States at the 2022 Winter Olympics.

== Career statistics ==
=== Regular season and playoffs ===
			Regular season					Playoffs
Season	Team	League	GP	G	A	Pts	PIM	GP	G	A	Pts	PIM
2009–10	Fargo Force	USHL	55	3	10	13	69	13	0	4	4	22
2010–11	Fargo Force	USHL	51	11	22	33	132	5	2	0	2	18
2011–12	Fargo Force	USHL	55	6	18	24	92	6	1	2	3	8
2012–13	University of Nebraska Omaha	WCHA	32	0	2	2	45	—	—	—	—	—
2013–14	University of Nebraska Omaha	NCHC	37	2	7	9	30	—	—	—	—	—
2014–15	University of Nebraska Omaha	NCHC	39	5	11	16	55	—	—	—	—	—
2015–16	University of Nebraska Omaha	NCHC	35	5	11	16	51	—	—	—	—	—
2015–16	San Diego Gulls	AHL	5	0	1	1	4	8	0	1	1	4
2016–17	San Diego Gulls	AHL	37	4	6	10	10	10	0	2	2	0
2016–17	Utah Grizzlies	ECHL	1	0	1	1	0	—	—	—	—	—
2017–18	San Diego Gulls	AHL	40	0	9	9	21	—	—	—	—	—
2018–19	Milwaukee Admirals	AHL	19	0	4	4	10	—	—	—	—	—
2018–19	Atlanta Gladiators	ECHL	5	1	2	3	10	—	—	—	—	—
2018–19	AIK IF	Allsv	6	2	1	3	4	—	—	—	—	—
2019–20	IF Björklöven	Allsv	49	6	19	25	77	—	—	—	—	—
2020–21	IK Oskarshamn	SHL	52	4	15	19	100	—	—	—	—	—
2021–22	IK Oskarshamn	SHL	50	2	13	15	65	10	1	2	3	8
2022–23	Växjö Lakers	SHL	49	4	18	22	38	18	0	6	6	22
2023–24	Växjö Lakers	SHL	51	2	14	16	115	8	1	4	5	12
2024–25	Växjö Lakers	SHL	50	4	5	9	54	8	0	1	1	8
SHL totals			252	16	65	81	372	44	2	13	15	50

=== International ===
Year	Team	Event	Result	GP	G	A	Pts	PIM
2022	United States	OG	5th	4	0	1	1	0
Senior totals				4	0	1	1	0

== Awards and honors ==
Awards	Year
SHL
Le Mat Trophy	2023
