= Brian Ferlin =

American ice hockey player (born 1992)

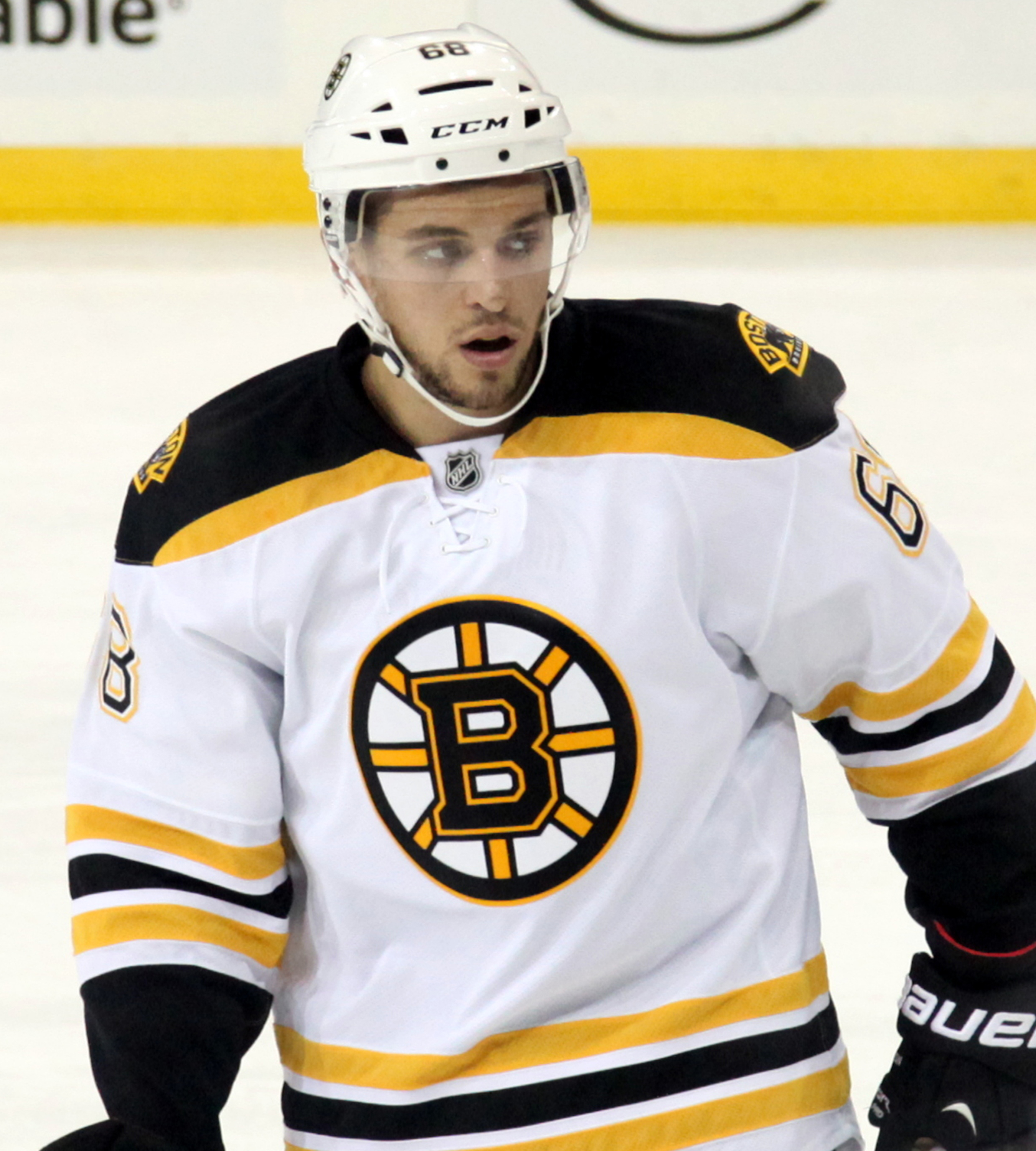
- Ferlin with the Boston Bruins in September 2015
- Born: June 3, 1992 (age 34) Jacksonville, Florida, U.S.
- Height: 6 ft 2 in (188 cm)
- Weight: 209 lb (95 kg; 14 st 13 lb)
- Position: Right wing
- Shot: Right
- Played for: Boston Bruins
- NHL draft: 121st overall, 2011; Boston Bruins
- Playing career: 2014–2017

Brian Ferlin (born June 3, 1992) is an American former professional ice hockey winger who played in the Boston Bruins organization of the National Hockey League (NHL). He was selected by the Bruins in the 4th round (121st overall) of the 2011 NHL entry draft.

== Playing career ==
Ferlin started to play hockey in Jacksonville, Florida at the age of five. After moving to Indianapolis for his last two years of high school, he played collegiate hockey in the NCAA Men's Division I college hockey for the Cornell Big Red men's ice hockey team in the ECAC Hockey conference. In 2012, he was awarded Cornell's Greg Ratushny Award, presented to the most promising freshman.

Before attending Cornell University, Ferlin played junior hockey with the Indiana Ice in the United States Hockey League. Ferlin's outstanding play during the 2010–11 season was rewarded with his being selected to play in the 2011 USHL All-Star Game.

On April 11, 2014, after his collegiate career, Ferlin signed a two-year entry-level contract with the Boston Bruins.

In the 2014–15 season, Ferlin made his professional debut with the Bruins' AHL affiliate in Providence. On February 20, 2015, Ferlin made his NHL debut in a game against the St. Louis Blues. He scored his first NHL point, an assist, during the following game against the Chicago Blackhawks on February 22, 2015.

On July 1, 2017, Ferlin signed a one-year, two-way deal as a free agent with the Edmonton Oilers. After he was cleared to return, he played in just 7 games with AHL affiliate, the Bakersfield Condors, before he was removed from the roster, citing retirement.

== Career statistics ==
			Regular season					Playoffs
Season	Team	League	GP	G	A	Pts	PIM	GP	G	A	Pts	PIM
2008–09	Jacksonville Ice Dogs	MetJHL	38	45	44	89	33	—	—	—	—	—
2009–10	Indiana Ice	USHL	57	6	10	16	36	8	1	2	3	2
2010–11	Indiana Ice	USHL	55	25	48	73	26	5	1	4	5	4
2011–12	Cornell University	ECAC	26	8	13	21	30	—	—	—	—	—
2012–13	Cornell University	ECAC	34	10	14	24	55	—	—	—	—	—
2013–14	Cornell University	ECAC	32	13	14	27	26	—	—	—	—	—
2014–15	Providence Bruins	AHL	53	11	9	20	40	—	—	—	—	—
2014–15	Boston Bruins	NHL	7	0	1	1	0	—	—	—	—	—
2015–16	Providence Bruins	AHL	23	6	8	14	27	3	0	1	1	2
2016–17	Providence Bruins	AHL	2	0	0	0	2	—	—	—	—	—
2017–18	Bakersfield Condors	AHL	7	1	0	1	6	—	—	—	—	—
NHL totals			7	0	1	1	0	—	—	—	—	—

== Awards and honors ==
Award	Year
USHL All-Star Game	2010–11
All-ECAC Rookie Team	2011–12
ECAC Hockey Rookie of the Year	2011–12
Ivy League Rookie of the Year	2011–12
All-Ivy League First Team	2013–14
All-ECAC Third Team	2013–14

Awards and achievements
Preceded by Andrew Calof	ECAC Hockey Rookie of the Year; 2011–12	Succeeded by Jason Kasford
