= Joakim Ryan =

Swedish ice hockey player (born 1993)

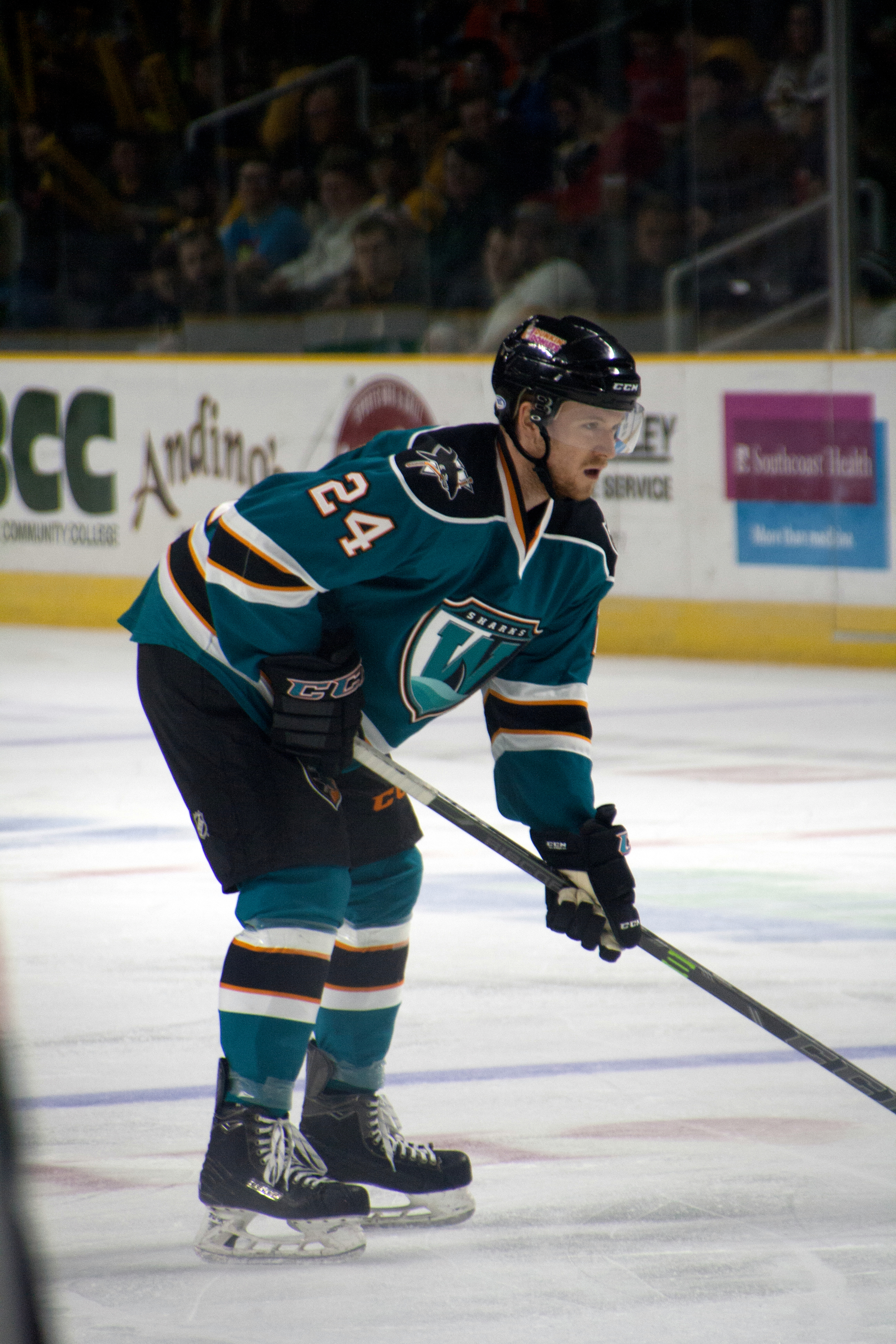
- Ryan with the Worcester Sharks in 2015
- Born: June 17, 1993 (age 33) Rumson, New Jersey, U.S.
- Height: 5 ft 11 in (180 cm)
- Weight: 185 lb (84 kg; 13 st 3 lb)
- Position: Defense
- Shoots: Left
- NHL team Former teams: Free Agent; San Jose Sharks; Los Angeles Kings; Carolina Hurricanes; Malmö Redhawks
- NHL draft: 198th overall, 2012; San Jose Sharks
- Playing career: 2015–present

Joakim Ryan (born June 17, 1993) is an American-Swedish professional ice hockey defenseman who is currently an unrestricted free agent. He most recently played for the Chicago Wolves in the American Hockey League (AHL) while under contract with the Carolina Hurricanes of the National Hockey League (NHL). He was selected by the San Jose Sharks in the seventh round (198th overall) of the 2012 NHL entry draft.

== Playing career ==
Raised in Rumson, New Jersey, Ryan played high school hockey at Christian Brothers Academy in Lincroft, New Jersey.

Ryan played collegiate hockey for the NCAA Division I Cornell Big Red men's ice hockey team which competes in the ECAC Hockey conference. In his junior year, Ryan's outstanding play was rewarded with a selection to the 2013–14 All-Ivy League First Team.

At the completion of his senior season, Ryan was signed an entry-level contract with the San Jose Sharks on March 26, 2015. He was then assigned to then AHL affiliate, the Worcester Sharks, to complete the 2014–15 season.

He signed a new two-year contract extension with the Sharks on June 19, 2017. He was recalled from the AHL on December 22, 2017, and he scored his first two NHL goals in a 6–4 victory against the Edmonton Oilers on February 10, 2018. He made his Stanley Cup playoffs debut on May 2, 2018, in a 4–0 win over the Vegas Golden Knights. The Sharks ended up losing to the Knights in six games.

On July 1, 2019, Ryan signed as a free agent to a one-year, $725,000 contract with the Los Angeles Kings. In the 2019–20 season with the Kings, Ryan used in a depth defensive role appeared in 35 games scoring one goal and adding four assists.

A free agent after his lone season with the Kings, during the COVID-19 adjusted off-season, Ryan signed a one-year, two-way contract with the Carolina Hurricanes on October 12, 2020. In the pandemic delayed 2020–21 season, Ryan was a part of the club's extended roster on the taxi squad, before he was assigned to AHL affiliate, the Chicago Wolves. After 4 games with the Wolves, Ryan returned to the Hurricanes, making his debut with the club on April 22, 2021, against the Florida Panthers. He finished the season having played in just 4 games with the Hurricanes, going scoreless.

As an impending free agent, Ryan halted his NHL career by opting to sign a contract in Sweden with former youth club, Malmö Redhawks of the SHL, on June 11, 2021.

After three seasons in the SHL with the Redhawks, Ryan returned to North America by signing a one-year, two-way contract in a return with the Carolina Hurricanes for the 2024–25 season on July 14, 2024.

== Personal life ==
Ryan is the son of former professional tennis player Catarina Lindqvist and Bill Ryan, who played lacrosse at the University of New Hampshire. Ryan grew up as a New York Rangers fan and spent two years living in Sweden from 2003 to 2005 where he was a top ranked tennis player. While in high school at Christian Brothers, Ryan was also a standout lacrosse player, finishing his career with 153 goals and 222 points, which, at his time of graduation, placed him second and fifth on CBA's all time lists respectively.

== Career statistics ==
=== Regular season and playoffs ===
			Regular season					Playoffs
Season	Team	League	GP	G	A	Pts	PIM	GP	G	A	Pts	PIM
2008–09	New Jersey Devils Youth 16U AAA	AYHL	29	8	17	25	14	—	—	—	—	—
2009–10	New Jersey Devils Youth 16U AAA	AYHL	32	13	23	36	34	—	—	—	—	—
2010–11	Dubuque Fighting Saints	USHL	53	3	29	32	26	11	2	3	5	2
2011–12	Cornell University	ECAC	34	7	10	17	20	—	—	—	—	—
2012–13	Cornell University	ECAC	34	3	20	23	12	—	—	—	—	—
2013–14	Cornell University	ECAC	32	8	16	24	27	—	—	—	—	—
2014–15	Cornell University	ECAC	23	1	13	14	27	—	—	—	—	—
2014–15	Worcester Sharks	AHL	7	0	2	2	2	—	—	—	—	—
2015–16	San Jose Barracuda	AHL	66	2	26	28	26	4	0	3	3	0
2016–17	San Jose Barracuda	AHL	65	10	39	49	41	15	4	7	11	4
2017–18	San Jose Sharks	NHL	62	3	9	12	8	3	0	0	0	0
2018–19	San Jose Sharks	NHL	44	0	7	7	15	20	0	1	1	0
2019–20	Los Angeles Kings	NHL	35	1	4	5	10	—	—	—	—	—
2020–21	Chicago Wolves	AHL	4	0	2	2	2	—	—	—	—	—
2020–21	Carolina Hurricanes	NHL	4	0	0	0	0	—	—	—	—	—
2021–22	Malmö Redhawks	SHL	52	9	22	31	14	—	—	—	—	—
2022–23	Malmö Redhawks	SHL	52	1	14	15	16	—	—	—	—	—
2023–24	Malmö Redhawks	SHL	52	7	11	18	16	—	—	—	—	—
2024–25	Chicago Wolves	AHL	59	2	6	8	14	2	0	0	0	0
NHL totals			145	4	20	24	33	23	0	1	1	0
SHL totals			156	17	47	64	46	—	—	—	—	—

=== International ===
Year	Team	Event	Result	GP	G	A	Pts	PIM
2010	Sweden	U17	3rd place, bronze medalist(s)	6	1	1	2	2
Junior totals				6	1	1	2	2

== Awards and honors ==
Award	Year
College
All-Ivy League First Team	2013–14
All-ECAC First Team	2014–15
All-ECAC Third Team	2015–16
