= Michael Parks (ice hockey) =

American ice hockey player (born 1992)

- Born: February 15, 1992 (age 34) St. Louis, Missouri, U.S.
- Height: 5 ft 11 in (180 cm)
- Weight: 187 lb (85 kg; 13 st 5 lb)
- Position: Right wing
- Shot: Right
- Played for: Lehigh Valley Phantoms; Vaasan Sport; Timrå IK; Dornbirn Bulldogs; HKM Zvolen
- NHL draft: 149th overall, 2010; Philadelphia Flyers
- Playing career: 2015–2020

Michael Parks (born February 15, 1992) is an American former professional ice hockey player who played in the American Hockey League (AHL), Finnish Liiga, Swedish HockeyAllsvenskan, and Slovak Extraliga.

== Career ==
Parks was drafted in the fifth round of the 2010 NHL entry draft by the Philadelphia Flyers. After four seasons at the University of North Dakota, he started his career with the Lehigh Valley Phantoms of the American Hockey League (AHL) in 2015 and the Quad City Mallards of the ECHL in 2016.

Parks signed a contract in Finland to play for top flight Liiga team, Vaasan Sport on July 26, 2017. Late in the 2017–18 season, Parks joined Timrå IK in the Swedish Allsvenskan.

In the 2018–19 season, Parks continued his career in Europe agreeing to a one-year contract with Austrian club, Dornbirn Bulldogs on July 9, 2018. As a regular among the Bulldogs top-nine forwards, Parks added 10 goals and 22 points through 44 regular-season games.

As a free agent, Parks opted to return to North America and the ECHL after two seasons abroad, agreeing to a one-year deal with home state team, the Kansas City Mavericks on July 31, 2019.

== Career statistics ==
			Regular season					Playoffs
Season	Team	League	GP	G	A	Pts	PIM	GP	G	A	Pts	PIM
2009–10	Cedar Rapids RoughRiders	USHL	51	11	11	22	57	5	0	1	1	0
2010–11	Cedar Rapids RoughRiders	USHL	56	25	16	41	42	8	3	1	4	6
2011–12	University of North Dakota	WCHA	42	12	10	22	38	—	—	—	—	—
2012–13	University of North Dakota	WCHA	25	7	1	8	31	—	—	—	—	—
2013–14	University of North Dakota	NCHC	42	12	18	30	28	—	—	—	—	—
2014–15	University of North Dakota	NCHC	42	12	20	32	44	—	—	—	—	—
2015–16	Lehigh Valley Phantoms	AHL	3	0	1	1	0	—	—	—	—	—
2016–17	Quad City Mallards	ECHL	61	29	27	56	37	5	1	0	1	4
2017–18	Vaasan Sport	Liiga	46	11	9	20	45	—	—	—	—	—
2017–18	Timrå IK	Allsv	5	0	1	1	2	8	1	0	1	2
2018–19	Dornbirn Bulldogs	EBEL	44	10	12	22	30	—	—	—	—	—
2019–20	Kansas City Mavericks	ECHL	18	5	5	10	8	—	—	—	—	—
2019–20	HKM Zvolen	SVK	23	6	13	19	36	—	—	—	—	—
Liiga totals			46	11	9	20	45	—	—	—	—	—
