= Austin Czarnik =

American ice hockey player (born 1992)

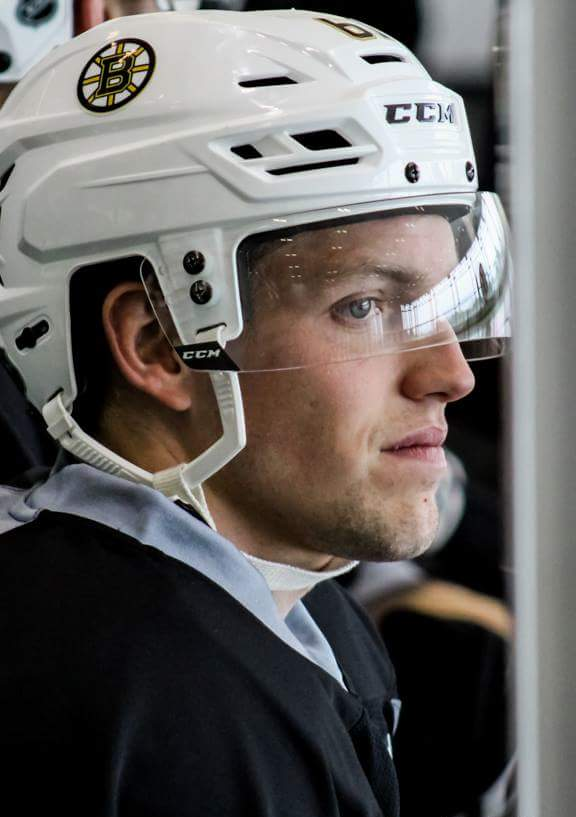
- Czarnik with the Boston Bruins in 2016
- Born: December 12, 1992 (age 33) Washington Township, Michigan, U.S.
- Height: 5 ft 9 in (175 cm)
- Weight: 170 lb (77 kg; 12 st 2 lb)
- Position: Center
- Shoots: Right
- NL team Former teams: Lausanne HC; Boston Bruins; Calgary Flames; New York Islanders; Seattle Kraken; Detroit Red Wings; SC Bern
- NHL draft: Undrafted
- Playing career: 2015–present

Austin Czarnik (born December 12, 1992) is an American professional ice hockey center who is currently playing for Lausanne HC of the National League (NL). Undrafted, Czarnik has played in the National Hockey League (NHL) with the Boston Bruins, Calgary Flames, New York Islanders, Seattle Kraken and Detroit Red Wings.

Prior to turning professional, Czarnik attended Miami University for four years where he was named to the CCHA All-Conference First Team, AHCA All-American First Team, CCHA First Team, and NCHC All-Tournament Team.

== Playing career ==
As a youth, Czarnik played in the 2005 Quebec International Pee-Wee Hockey Tournament with the Detroit Compuware minor ice hockey team.

Czarnik played four seasons of NCAA Division I hockey for the Miami RedHawks (2011–2015). In his sophomore year at Miami University, Czarnik's outstanding play was rewarded with a selection to the 2012–13 CCHA All-Conference First Team. On June 24, 2013, prior to the start of his junior season, Czarnik was named captain of the RedHawks by head coach Enrico Blasi. He held this position through the end of his senior season.

Days after Miami was eliminated from the 2015 NCAA Division I Men's Ice Hockey Tournament and his college career had come to a close, Czarnik signed an entry-level deal with the Boston Bruins on March 31, 2015. He was assigned to the Bruins' AHL affiliate, the Providence Bruins.

Prior to the 2016–17 NHL season, Czarnik made the Boston Bruins' roster out of training camp, making his NHL debut on October 13 for the Bruins' 6–3 win over the Columbus Blue Jackets. However, after two scoreless games and one healthy scratch with Boston, he was reassigned to Providence on October 20. However, following an elbow injury to David Backes, Boston recalled Czarnik on October 26. During a game that same day, Czarnik tallied his first NHL goal against the New York Rangers' Henrik Lundqvist in a 5–2 loss for the Bruins. On July 18, 2017, Czarnik was signed by the Bruins to a one-year contract to play in the 2017–18 season.

Czarnik participated in the Bruins training camp prior to the 2017–18 season, and made the opening night roster out of camp but was reassigned to the Providence Bruins after playing in two games. Czarnik and teammate Jordan Binnington were named the Providence Bruins representatives at the 2018 AHL All-Star Classic. He was later named to the AHL Second All-Star Team. After playing in 10 games with the Bruins during the 2017–18 season, Czarnik was reassigned to the AHL on February 10, where he remained for the rest of the season.

On July 1, 2018, having seen his career stall within the Bruins organization, Czarnik left as a free agent and signed a one-way, two-year, $2.5 million contract with the Calgary Flames. He made the Flames opening night roster out of training camp.

The New York Islanders signed Czarnik to a two-year deal, announced on October 13, 2020. Czarnik was placed on waivers on January 11, 2021 and was cleared the following day. After being assigned to the taxi squad, Czarnik was promoted to the active roster on January 31, 2021. Czarnik played his first game for the Islanders that evening, an OT loss to Philadelphia, 4-3. Czarnik wore number 11, and played right wing on the third line, which is centered by J-G Pageau. Czarnik saw a total of 14:12 of ice time, including action on the powerplay and penalty kill units. On February 1, Czarnik returned to the taxi squad.

In the following 2021–22 season, Czarnik cleared waivers and began the season with newly renamed AHL affiliate, the Bridgeport Islanders. He registered 15 points through 20 regular season games before he was recalled to New York and added 2 goals and 5 points through 11 games. On February 8, 2022, Czarnik's tenure with the Islanders briefly ended as he was claimed off waivers by expansion club, the Seattle Kraken on February 8, 2022. Czarnik appeared in just six games with the Kraken, registering two assists, only to be claimed back off waivers by the Islanders, on March 6, 2022. He was directly returned to Islanders AHL affiliate in Bridgeport.

On July 13, 2022, Czarnik signed a two-year, two-way contract with the Detroit Red Wings.

At the conclusion of his contract with the Red Wings, Czarnik left as a free agent and opted to sign his first contract abroad in agreeing to a one-year contract with Swiss club, SC Bern of the NL, on July 20, 2024.

On May 1, 2025, Czarnik signed a two-year contract with Lausanne HC, staying in the NL.

== Personal life ==
Czarnik is the cousin of Ravensburg Towerstars center Robert Czarnik.

== Career statistics ==
=== Regular season and playoffs ===
			Regular season					Playoffs
Season	Team	League	GP	G	A	Pts	PIM	GP	G	A	Pts	PIM
2008–09	U.S. NTDP U17	USDP	23	8	14	22	16	—	—	—	—	—
2008–09	U.S. NTDP U18	NAHL	42	16	18	34	12	9	4	2	6	10
2009–10	U.S. NTDP Juniors	USHL	26	10	18	28	25	—	—	—	—	—
2009–10	U.S. NTDP U18	USDP	61	22	32	54	27	—	—	—	—	—
2010–11	Green Bay Gamblers	USHL	46	20	14	34	33	11	3	1	4	2
2011–12	Miami RedHawks	CCHA	40	10	27	37	31	—	—	—	—	—
2012–13	Miami RedHawks	CCHA	42	14	26	40	24	—	—	—	—	—
2013–14	Miami RedHawks	NCHC	37	13	34	47	28	—	—	—	—	—
2014–15	Miami RedHawks	NCHC	40	9	36	45	36	—	—	—	—	—
2014–15	Providence Bruins	AHL	3	0	2	2	0	—	—	—	—	—
2015–16	Providence Bruins	AHL	68	20	41	61	24	3	2	1	3	2
2016–17	Boston Bruins	NHL	49	5	8	13	12	—	—	—	—	—
2016–17	Providence Bruins	AHL	22	6	17	23	4	17	3	4	7	10
2017–18	Boston Bruins	NHL	10	0	4	4	0	—	—	—	—	—
2017–18	Providence Bruins	AHL	64	25	44	69	24	4	2	4	6	0
2018–19	Calgary Flames	NHL	54	6	12	18	8	1	0	0	0	0
2019–20	Calgary Flames	NHL	8	2	1	3	0	—	—	—	—	—
2019–20	Stockton Heat	AHL	32	16	17	33	22	—	—	—	—	—
2020–21	New York Islanders	NHL	4	0	0	0	0	—	—	—	—	—
2021–22	Bridgeport Islanders	AHL	38	14	23	37	8	6	3	7	10	0
2021–22	New York Islanders	NHL	11	2	3	5	0	—	—	—	—	—
2021–22	Seattle Kraken	NHL	6	0	2	2	0	—	—	—	—	—
2022–23	Grand Rapids Griffins	AHL	43	14	23	37	8	—	—	—	—	—
2022–23	Detroit Red Wings	NHL	29	3	2	5	8	—	—	—	—	—
2023–24	Grand Rapids Griffins	AHL	38	10	18	28	12	9	4	4	8	6
2023–24	Detroit Red Wings	NHL	34	0	1	1	12	—	—	—	—	—
2024–25	SC Bern	NL	49	20	36	56	31	2	0	2	2	0
NHL totals			205	18	33	51	40	1	0	0	0	0
NL totals			49	20	36	56	31	2	0	2	2	0

=== International ===
Year	Team	Event	Result	GP	G	A	Pts	PIM
2009	United States	U17	3rd place, bronze medalist(s)	5	1	3	4	0
2010	United States	U18	1st place, gold medalist(s)	7	5	1	6	4
2012	United States	WJC	7th	6	2	2	4	0
Junior totals				18	8	6	14	4

== Awards and honors ==
Award	Year
College
All-CCHA Rookie Team	2011–12
All-CCHA First Team	2012–13
AHCA West First-Team All-American	2012–13
All-NCHC First Team	2013–14
AHCA West Second-Team All-American	2013–14
NCHC All-Tournament Team	2015
AHL
All-Rookie Team	2015–16
Second All-Star Team	2017–18
AHL All-Star Classic	2018

Awards and achievements
Preceded by Torey Krug	CCHA Player of the Year; 2012–13	Succeeded by Dryden McKay
