= List of ice hockey teams in Quebec =

The following is a list of ice hockey teams in Quebec, past and present. It includes the league(s) they play for, and championships won.

== Major professional ==
=== National Hockey League ===
Current
Team	City	Established	Stanley Cups	Notes
Montreal Canadiens	Montreal	1917	24	Founded in 1909 as a National Hockey Association Franchise
Former
Team	City	Existed	Stanley Cups	Notes
Montreal Maroons	Montreal	1924–1938	2	
Montreal Wanderers	Montreal	1917–1918	0	Founded in 1903 as a Federal Amateur Hockey League team; Folded six games into 1917–18 season after Montreal Arena burned down
Quebec Bulldogs	Quebec City	1919–1920	0	Founded in 1888 as an Amateur Hockey Association franchise; Became the Hamilton Tigers in 1920
Quebec Nordiques	Quebec City	1979–1995	0	Founded in 1972 as a World Hockey Association franchise; Became the Colorado Avalanche in 1995

=== National Hockey Association ===
Team	City	Existed	League titles	Stanley Cups	Notes
Montreal Canadiens	Montreal	1909–1917	2	1	Founded in 1909 as the Haileybury Hockey Club; Joined National Hockey League in 1917
Montreal Shamrocks	Montreal	1909–1910	0	0	
Montreal Wanderers	Montreal	1909–1917	1	1	Joined National Hockey League in 1917
Quebec Bulldogs	Quebec City	1910–1917	2	2	Joined National Hockey League in 1919

=== World Hockey Association ===
Team	City	Existed	Avco Cups	Notes
Quebec Nordiques	Quebec City	1972–1979	1	Joined National Hockey League in 1979

=== Professional Women's Hockey League ===
Current
Team	City	Established	Walter Cups	Notes
Montreal Victoire	Laval	2023	1	

== Minor professional ==
=== Canadian-American Hockey League ===
Team	City	Existed	Championships	Notes
Quebec Castors	Quebec City	1926–1935	0	Relocated in 1935 to become Springfield Indians.

=== American Hockey League ===
Current
Team	City	Established	Calder Cups	Notes
Laval Rocket	Laval	2017	0	Previously the St. John's Ice Caps. Owned by NHL affiliate, the Montreal Canadiens.
Former
Team	City	Existed	Calder Cups	Notes
Montreal Voyageurs	Montreal	1971–1972	0	Became the Nova Scotia Voyagers in 1972
Quebec Aces	Quebec City	1959–1971	0	Member of the Quebec Senior Hockey League and Quebec Hockey League from 1944 to 1959
Quebec Citadelles	Quebec City	1999–2002	0	Previously the Fredericton Canadiens; Merged with the Hamilton Bulldogs in 2002
Sherbrooke Canadiens	Sherbrooke	1984–1989	1	Became the Fredericton Canadiens
Sherbrooke Jets	Sherbrooke	1982–1984	0	

=== International Hockey League ===
Team	City	Existed	Turner Cups	Notes
Quebec Rafales	Quebec City	1996–1998	0	Founded in 1992 as the Atlanta Knights

=== Ligue Nord-Américaine de Hockey ===
Current
Team	City	Established	Championships	Notes
Jonquière Marquis	Saguenay	1996	6	Founded in 1996 as the Saint-Lin-Laurentides Gladiateurs and has since relocated several times under various names.
Les Pétroliers du Nord	Laval	2018	0	Originated as the Berlin BlackJacks in Berlin, New Hampshire, before relocating midseason.
Rivière-du-Loup 3L	Rivière-du-Loup	2008	1	Originated in 2004 as the Rivière-du-Loup CIMT various senior and semiprofessional leagues before joining the LNAH in 2008.
Saint-Georges Cool FM 103.5	Saint-Georges	1996	1	Founded in 1996 as the Rive-Sud Jackals.
Sorel-Tracy Éperviers	Sorel-Tracy	1996	5	Founded in 1996 as the Saint-Gabriel Blizzard.
Thetford Assurancia	Thetford Mines	1996	2	Founded in 1996 as the Thetford Mines Coyotes.
Former
Team	City	Existed	Championships	Notes
Asbestos Aztèques	Asbestos	1997–2003	0	Known as the Asbestos Dubé in the 2001–02 season.
Granby Prédateurs (LNAH)	Granby	1997–1998; 1999–2004	0	Founded as the Granby Blitz, for only the 1997–98 season.
Lasalle Rapides	LaSalle	1996–2003	2	Founded in 1996 as the Lachute Rapides.
Louiseville Jets	Louiseville	1996–1997	0	
Pont Rouge Lois Jeans	Pont-Rouge	1996–2010	2	Founded in 1996 as the Vanier Voyageurs.
Rivière-du-Loup Promutuel	Rivière-du-Loup	2001–2004	0	
Saguenay Fjord	Saguenay	1997–2005	0	Founded in 1997 as the Jonquière Condors.
Saint-Hyacinthe Chiefs	Saint-Hyacinthe	1996–2009	0	Founded in 1996 as the Acton Vale Nova.
Sherbrooke Saint-Francois	Sherbrooke	1996–2012	2	Founded in 1996 as the Windsor Papetiers; relocated back to Windsor, Quebec, in 2011 and then to Cornwall, Ontario, in 2012.
Sorel Royaux	Sorel	1996–2004	0	Founded in 1996 as the Sorel Dinosaures, changed name to Royaux in 1999.
Trois-Rivières Draveurs	Trois-Rivières	1996–2018	1	Founded in 1996 as the Pont-Rouge Grand Portneuf.

== Junior ==
=== Quebec Maritimes Junior Hockey League ===
Current
Team	City	Established	President's Cups	Memorial Cups	Notes
Baie-Comeau Drakkar	Baie-Comeau	1997	0	0	
Blainville-Boisbriand Armada	Boisbriand	2011	0	0	Founded as the St. John's Fog Devils in 2005 before moving to Montreal Junior Hockey Club in 2008.
Chicoutimi Saguenéens	Chicoutimi	1973	2	0	
Drummondville Voltigeurs	Drummondville	1982	1	0	
Gatineau Olympiques	Gatineau	1973	7	1	Previously known as the Hull Festivals and Hull Olympiques.
Quebec Remparts	Quebec City	1997	0	1	Founded in 1991 as the Beauport Harfangs.
Rimouski Océanic	Rimouski	1995	3	1	Founded in 1969 as the Sherbrooke Castors.
Rouyn-Noranda Huskies	Rouyn-Noranda	1996	2	1	Founded in 1933 as the Montreal Junior Canadiens.
Shawinigan Cataractes	Shawinigan	1969	0	1	Previously known as the Bruins and Dynamos.
Sherbrooke Phoenix	Sherbrooke	2012	0	0	
Val-d'Or Foreurs	Val-d'Or	1993	3	0	
Victoriaville Tigres	Victoriaville	1987	1	0	Founded in 1982 as the Longueuil Chevaliers

=== Ontario Hockey Association ===
Team	City	Established	J. Ross Robertson Cups	Memorial Cups	Notes
Montreal Junior Canadiens	Montreal	1961	2	3	Founded in 1933 in the QJHL.

=== Quebec Junior Hockey League ===
Team	City	Established	League titles	Fred Page Cups	Centennial Cups	Notes
Champlain Cougars	Sherbrooke	2003	1	0	0	
Le Collège Français de Longueuil	Brossard	1970	2	0	0	
Granby Inouk	Granby	????	0	0	0	
Joliette Action	Joliette	????	2	1	0	
Kahnawake Condors	Kahnawake	????	0	0	0	
Laflèche Titans	Trois-Rivières-Ouest	????	0	0	0	
Lachine Maroons	Lachine	????	0	0	0	
St. Eustache Patriots	Saint-Eustache	????	0	0	0	
St. Félicien Multiconcessionnaire	Saint-Félicien	????	0	0	0	
St. Jérome Panthers	Saint-Jérôme	????	1	1	0	
St. Lawrence Lions	Sainte-Foy	????	0	0	0	
Terrebonne Cobras	Terrebonne	????	0	0	0	
Valleyfield Braves	Salaberry-de-Valleyfield	????	3	0	0	
Vaudreuil Mustangs	Kirkland	????	1	0	0	

=== Greater Metro Junior A Hockey League ===
Current
Team	City	Established	League titles	Notes
Temiscaming Titans	Témiscaming	2011	1	
Ville-Marie Pirates	Ville-Marie	2017	1	
Former
Team	City	Existed	League titles	Notes
Temiscaming Royals	Témiscaming	2007–2008	0	First GMHL team in Quebec; joined Northern Ontario Junior Hockey League in 2008.
Ville-Marie Dragons	Ville-Marie	2008–2009	0	Folded midseason

=== Junior B hockey leagues ===
League	Region	Established	Provincial titles	Notes
Beauce-Bellechasse Junior AA Hockey League	--	????	??	
Estrie-Mauricie Junior AA Hockey League	--	????	??	
Laurentides-Lanaudière Junior AA Hockey League	--	????	??	

== Semi-professional, senior and amateur ==
=== Canadian Women's Hockey League ===
Team	City	Existed	CWHL championships	Notes
Les Canadiennes	Montréal	2007–2019	4	Previously known as the Montréal Stars and won two Clarkson Cups before it became the CWHL championship.
Quebec Phenix	Montréal	2007–2008	0	

=== National Women's Hockey League ===
Team	City	Existed	NWHL champions	Notes
Montreal Axion	Montréal	1998–2007	1	Previously known as Bonaventure Wingstar (1998–1999) and Montréal Wingstar (1999–2003)
Montreal Jofa Titan	Montréal	1998–1999	0	
Quebec Avalanche	Quebec City	1999–2007	0	Previously known as Sainte-Julie Pantheres (1999–2001) and Metropol Le Cheyenne (2001–2003)
Laval Le Mistral	Laval	1998–2001	0	

=== Amateur ===
Team	City	Existed	League titles	Stanley Cups	Notes
Montreal Hockey Club	Montreal	1892–1908	3	3	Played in AHA, CAHL and ECAHA; Also won Allan Cup in 1930
Montreal Shamrocks	Montreal	1888–1909	2	2	Played in AHA, CAHL and ECAHA; Originally known as the Montreal Crystals
Montreal Victorias	Montreal	1888?-1908	4	5	Played in AHA, CAHL and ECAHA
Montreal Wanderers	Montreal	1903–1909	3	7	Played in FAHL and ECAHA; Also played in the pro NHA and NHL
Quebec Bulldogs	Quebec City	1888–1908	1	0	Played in AHA, CAHL and ECAHA

=== College ===
==== Hockey collégial féminin RSEQ ====
Team	City	Established	Championship regular season	Championship playoff Titles
Cheminots du Cégep St-Jérôme	St-Jérôme	1997	2	1
Dragons du Collège Laflèche	Trois-Rivières	1999	0	0
Dawson Blues	Westmount	1998	2	2
John Abbott Islanders	Sainte-Anne-de-Bellevue	1992	0	0
Patriotes du Cégep St-Laurent	Montreal	1992	0	1
Lynx du Collège Édouard-Monpetit	Longueuil	1999	2	2
Nordiques du Collège Lionel-Groulx	Sainte-Thérèse	1999	0	0
Titans du Cégep Limoilou	Limoilou	1999	0	2

=== University ===
Team	City	Established	Conference titles	University Cups	Women's titles	Notes
Concordia Stingers	Montreal	1975	27(M&W)	N/A	2	Men's and women's hockey
McGill Redbirds / McGill Martlets	Montreal	1954	14	1	4	Men's and women's hockey
Montreal Carabins	Montreal	2009	0	0	0	Only plays women's hockey team.
UQTR Patriotes	Trois-Rivières		8	4	N/A	Only plays men's hockey.

== League, regional and national championships ==
Championship	Times won	Description
Stanley Cup	48	Total championships
Stanley Cup	25	National Hockey League champion
NHA Championship	5	National Hockey Association champion
Avco World Trophy	1	World Hockey Association champion
Calder Cup	1	American Hockey League champion
Memorial Cup	8	Canadian Major-Junior national champion
Allan Cup	10	Canadian senior national champion
Royal Bank Cup	0	Canadian Junior "A" national champion
NWHL Championship	1	National Women's Hockey League championship
CWNL Championship	3	Canadian Women's Hockey League championship
Clarkson Cup	1	women's hockey champion in North-America
University Cup	5	CIS national men's university champion
CIS Women's Championship	3	CIS national women's university champion
Coupe Dodge	12	Quebec women's collegiate champion

== See also ==
- Hockey Québec
