= Cornwall Colts =

Central Canada Hockey League team in Cornwall

- City: Cornwall, Ontario
- League: CCHL
- Division: East
- Founded: 1988
- Home arena: Cornwall Civic Complex
- Colours: Blue; Red
- General manager: Christian Lajoie
- Head coach: Christian Lajoie
- Media: FloSports

Franchise history
- 1988–1990: Massena Turbines
- 1990–1992: Massena Americans
- Since 1992: Cornwall Colts

Championships
- League: 1995; 1996; 2000; 2001; 2013
- Regional: 2000

The Cornwall Colts are a Junior ice hockey team based in Cornwall, Ontario. The Colts compete in the Central Canada Hockey League (CCHL) as a member of the East (Yzerman) Division. The team plays its home games at the Cornwall Civic Complex, an arena which was previously the home of five different hockey franchises, such was the Cornwall Royals, Cornwall Aces, Cornwall Comets, the Cornwall River Kings as well as the Cornwall Nationals. They are the first Junior A hockey team in Cornwall; the others were either major junior or minor professional teams.

Founded in 1988, the Colts were known as the Massena Americans, and moved to Cornwall in 1992 when the Cornwall Royals were sold and moved away from the city.

== Championship era ==
The Cornwall Colts quickly became CJHL powerhouses winning Art Bogart Cups in 1995 and 1996. The 1996 final between the Gloucester Rangers was played at the Cornwall Civic Complex. A sold-out crowd of over 4,000 people watched the Cornwall Colts defeat the Gloucester Rangers 4–3 in Game 7. In 1998, the Cornwall Colts were swept 4 games to 0 by the Brockville Braves. Cornwall went on to claim the Art Bogart Cup over the Brockville Braves two years later, and went on to defeat the Halifax Oland Exports to win the Fred Page Cup. Despite going win-less at the Royal Bank Cup in Fort McMurray, Alberta, the entire City of Cornwall stood right behind the Colts every step of the way. The Colts would continue their winning ways in 2000–01 as the Colts whitewashed the Ottawa Junior Senators 7–0 in Game 7 at the Si Miller Arena on Water Street. But, suffered a heart-breaking overtime loss to the St. Jerome Panthers in the final game of the Fred Page Cup.

=== 2003 Fred Page Cup ===
The Cornwall Colts and the City of Cornwall was awarded the Fred Page Cup for 2003. The tournament was originally awarded to the Ottawa Junior Senators, but backed out due to arena trouble and accommodations. The tournament was played in the Cornwall Civic Complex, instead of the SI Millar Arena, because it was too small. The tournament was a success, despite that the Colts bowed out in the semi-finals with a double-overtime loss to the Nepean Raiders.

=== 2008 Royal Bank Cup ===
In fall 2005, the City of Cornwall and the Cornwall Colts were awarded Canada's most prestigious Junior A hockey tournament for 2008. The runner-up for the tournament were the Pembroke Lumber Kings. For the 2007–08 season, the Cornwall Colts shifted over to the Cornwall Civic Complex and left the Si Miller Arena for good. The Colts now had the biggest arena in the league, despite that attendance figures were surprisingly low. The Colts finished 6th and lost the quarter-finals. The Colts rested for several weeks and entered the tournament with expectations of winning the Royal Bank Cup. But, a 7–0 loss to the Humboldt Broncos of the SJHL in the opening contest wasn't the start they were looking for. The Colts managed to win the next two games against the Oakville Blades (5-4) and Weeks Crushers (6-1), but lost in the semi-finals to the eventual champion Humboldt Broncos. Captain Darcy Findlay received the RBC most valuable player award for the tournament.

== Arena ==
The Ed Lumley Arena in the Cornwall Civic Complex became the permanent home for the Cornwall Colts in 2007. Before, the Colts played their home games at the now-demolished Si Miller Arena. The Cornwall Colts played their games at the Cornwall Civic Complex since 1992, but moved into the Si Miller in 1997. The Cornwall Civic Complex was used to host the 2003 and 2015 Fred Page Cup tournaments. In 2025 Colts' home games were played at the Benson Centre during renovations of the Ed Lumley Arena.

== Season-by-season record ==
Note: GP = Games Played, W = Wins, L = Losses, T = Ties, OTL = Overtime Losses, GF = Goals for, GA = Goals against

Season	GP	W	L	T	OTL	GF	GA	Points	Finish	Playoffs
1988-89	56	14	41	1	0	208	337	29	8th CJHL	
1989-90	56	14	36	3	3	217	355	34	9th CJHL	
1990-91	53	15	33	2	3	225	331	35	7th CJHL	
1991-92	57	16	38	2	1	269	362	35	7th CJHL	
1992-93	57	33	15	4	5	343	304	75	3rd CJHL	
1993-94	57	25	25	4	3	304	311	57	8th CJHL	
1994-95	54	37	12	3	2	285	211	79	1st CJHL	Won League
1995-96	54	45	6	3	-	348	214	93	1st CJHL	Won League
1996-97	54	28	23	3	-	217	202	59	5th CJHL	
1997-98	56	29	17	10	8	225	183	76	1st CJHL-R	
1998-99	54	31	19	4	0	227	201	66	2nd CJHL-R	
1999-00	56	45	10	1	0	306	183	91	1st CJHL-R	Won League, won FPC
2000-01	55	42	10	3	0	324	189	88	1st CJHL-R	Won League
2001-02	55	46	7	2	0	347	173	94	1st CJHL-R	Lost final
2002-03	55	31	13	11	1	275	194	74	2nd CJHL-R	Lost quarter-final
2003-04	55	33	16	3	3	256	173	72	2nd CJHL-R	Lost semi-final
2004-05	57	34	17	3	3	238	186	74	1st CJHL-R	Lost semi-final
2005-06	57	26	24	3	4	236	233	59	3rd CJHL-R	Lost semi-final
2006-07	55	15	32	5	3	154	215	38	4th CJHL-R	Did not Qualify
2007-08	60	31	24	1	4	211	207	67	6th CJHL	
2008-09	60	30	29	-	1	188	215	61	7th CJHL	
2009-10	62	41	16	-	5	242	171	87	3rd CJHL	Lost semi-final
2010-11	62	48	13	-	1	257	140	97	2nd CCHL	Lost final
2011-12	62	43	13	-	6	238	155	92	2nd CCHL	Lost final
2012-13	62	36	17	-	9	250	196	81	3rd CCHL	Won League
2013-14	62	30	22	-	10	180	190	70	6th CCHL	Lost quarter-final
2014-15	62	38	18	-	10	211	170	82	4th CCHL	Lost semi-final
2015-16	62	30	27	4	1	208	193	65	6th of 6 in East; 10th of 12 CCHL	Did not qualify
2016-17	62	41	14	4	3	232	171	89	2nd of 6 in East; 2nd of 12 CCHL	Won quarterfinals, 4-1 (Bears); Lost semifinals, 0-4 (Junior Senators)
2017-18	62	33	23	4	2	193	183	72	3rd of 6 in East; 5th of 12 CCHL	Lost quarterfinals, 3-4 (Hawks)
2018-19	62	24	29	7	2	160	193	57	5th of 6 in East; 9th of 12 CCHL	Did not qualify
2019-20	62	21	35	6	-	161	222	48	5th of 6 in East; 11th of 12 CCHL	Did not qualify
2020-21	Season cancelled									
2021-22	55	14	33	3	5	135	210	36	5th of 6 in East; 11th of 12 CCHL	Did not qualify
2022-23	55	26	24	3	2	175	181	57	4th of 6 in East; 8th of 12 CCHL	Lost quarterfinals, 1-4 (Junior Senators)
2023-24	55	33	17	1	4	201	143	71	2nd of 6 in East; 3rd of 12 CCHL	Won quarterfinals, 4-1 (Hawks); Lost semifinals, 1-4 (Bears)
2024-25	55	26	24	2	3	156	196	57	3rd of 6 Yzerman; 8th of 12 CCHL	Lost quarterfinals, 0-4 (Nationals)
2025-26	55	23	29	2	1	175	216	49	4th of 6 Yzerman; 9th of 12 CCHL	Did not qualify

== Regional championships ==
Eastern Canada Championships
MHL - QAAAJHL - CCHL - Host
Round robin play with 2nd vs 3rd in semi-final to advance against 1st in the finals.

Year	Round Robin	Record	Standing	Semifinal	Gold Medal Game
2013	L, Summerside Western Capitals 0-1; L, Truro Bearcats 2-6; W, Longueuil Collège Français 5-4	1-2-0	3rd of 4	OTL, Summerside Western Capitals 0-1	n/a
2003	W, Charlottetown Abbies 3-2; L, Lennoxville Cougars 0-5; W, Nepean Raiders 2-1	2-1-0	2nd of 4	L, Nepean Raiders 2-3	n/a
2001	W, Coaticook Frontaliers 7-5; W, St. Jerome Panthers 4-3; W, Antigonish Bulldogs 6-3	3-0-0	1st of 4	n/a	OTL, St. Jerome Panthers 3-4
2000	W, Halifax Oland Exports 7-5; OTW, Coaticook Frontaliers 4-3; W, Pembroke Lumber Kings 5-2	3-0-0	1st of 4	n/a	W, Halifax Oland Exports 6-3; Fred Page Cup Champs advance to Royal Bank Cup
1996	L, Dartmouth Oland Exports 3-6; L, Contrecoeur Blackhawks 4-7; L, Moncton Beavers 1-4	0-3-0	4th of 4	n/a	n/a
1995	OTW, Moncton Beavers 3-2; L, Valleyfield Braves 4-5; L, Joliette Nationals ?-?	1-2-0	3rd of 4	W, Valleyfield Braves ?-?	L, Joliette Nationals ?-?

== National championships ==
CANADIAN NATIONAL CHAMPIONSHIPS
Dudley Hewitt Champions - Central, Fred Page Champions - Eastern, Western Canada Cup Champions - Western, Western Canada Cup - Runners Up and Host
Round robin play with top 4 in semi-final and winners to finals.

Year	Round Robin	Record	Standing	Semifinal	Gold Medal Game
2000	L, Fort McMurray Oil Barons 2-5; L, Chilliwack Chiefs 2-3; OTL, Battlefords North Stars 3-4; L, Rayside-Balfour Sabrecats 4-5	0-4	5th of 5		

== Championships ==
CJHL Bogart Cup Championships: 1995, 1996, 2000, 2001, 2013
Eastern Canadian Fred Page Cup Championships: 2000
CJAHL Royal Bank Cup Championships: None

== Notable alumni ==
- Cam Barker
- Yann Danis
- Chad Kilger
- Kent McDonell
- Eric Meloche
- Jesse Winchester (ice hockey)

== Sources ==
- Benoit, Marc (3 September 2026). "The Cornwall Colts' new coach looks forward to season ahead". Cornwall Standard Freeholder. Postmedia.
