= Joliette Prédateurs =

- City: Joliette, Quebec, Canada
- League: Quebec Junior Hockey League
- Division: Alexandre Burrows
- Founded: 2008
- Colours: Black, red, and white
- Owner: Sir Eric Champoux
- General manager: Rémy Harrisson (2018–19)
- Head coach: Dave Thériault (2018–19)

Franchise history
- 2008-2017: Sainte-Agathe Montagnards
- 2017-2018: St-Gabriel-de-Brandon Montagnards
- 2018-2020: St-Gabriel-de-Brandon Prédateurs
- 2020-Present: Joliette Prédateurs

The Joliette Prédateurs are a junior "A" ice hockey team from Joliette, Quebec, Canada. They are a part of the Quebec Junior Hockey League.

== History ==
The Sainte-Agathe Montagnards were added to the Quebec Junior AAA Hockey League for the 2008–09 season.

The Montagnards began play in September 2008.

They moved to Saint-Gabriel-De-Brandon following the 2016–17 season. During the 2018 off season, the team acquired a new owner, new team colors and a new name for the 2018–19 season. After the 2019–20 season they moved to the City of Joliette.

== Season-by-season results ==
Season	GP	W	L	T	OTL	GF	GA	P	Results	Playoffs
2008-09	49	12	34	-	3	167	268	27	15th QJAAAHL	
2009-10	51	13	35	-	3	197	300	29	14th QJAAAHL	DNQ
2010-11	49	20	25	-	4	228	253	44	10th QJAAAHL	Lost quarter-final
2011-12	49	14	30	-	5	208	265	33	12th QJAAAHL	
2012-13	52	29	17	-	6	252	227	64	6th QJAAAHL	Lost semi-final
2013-14	52	32	18	-	2	281	259	66	3rd QJAAAHL-SL	Lost div. semi-final
2014-15	52	29	20	3	-	244	230	61	2 of 5 Martin St-Louis; 5th of 14 QJHL	Won first rd 4-1 (Lauréats} Won quarter-final 4-1 (Titans} Lost semi-final 1-4 (Collège Français}
2015-16	55	44	8	1	2	322	210	91	1st of 6 Burrows; 1st of 12 QJHL	Won quarter-final, 4-0 (Arctic); Lost semi-final, 3-4 (Inouk)
2016-17	49	20	27	1	1	232	253	42	4th of 6 Burrows; 7th of 12 QJHL	Won div. prelim rd, 3-0 (Rangers); Lost div. semi-final, 1-4 (Cobras)
St-Gabriel-de-Brandon Montagnards
2017-18	48	14	30	4	0	173	263	32	5th of 6 Burrows; 10th of 12 QJHL	Lost div. prelim rd, 0-2 (Forts)
St-Gabriel-de-Brandon Prédateurs
2018-19	48	18	28	1	1	194	261	58	10th of 13 QJHL	8th place (2-2-1-1) X-over series Won quarter-final, 0-4 (Cobras)
2019-20	48	10	36	1	1	160	285	22	6th of 6 91.9 Sports; 12th of 12 QJHL	Did not qualify for post season
Joliette Prédateurs
2020-21	Season lost due to COVID-19 restrictions									
2021-22	42	28	14	0	0	215	163	56	2nd of 4 North; 4h of 12 LHJQ	Lost quarter-final, 2-4 (Cobras)
2022-23	48	20	26	2	0	188	218	42	10th of 13 LHJQ	Lost quarter-final, 0-4 (Cobras)
2023-24	48	8	37	1	2	132	265	19	13th of 13 LHJQ	Did not qualify for post season
2024-25	48	11	30	3	4	155	223	29	13th of 13 LHJQ	Did not qualify for post season
