= 2018 Fred Page Cup =

Eastern Region Jr A Championship

Tournament details
- Venue: Jim Durrell Recreation Centre in Ottawa, Ontario
- Host team: Ottawa Jr. Senators

Final positions
- Champions: Ottawa Jr. Senators
- Runners-up: Longueuil College Francais

Tournament statistics
- Games played: 8

The 2018 Fred Page Cup was the 24th Canadian Eastern Junior A Ice Hockey Championship for the Canadian Junior Hockey League. The Ottawa Jr. Senators hosted for the second time in team history. The tournament was held May 2 to May 6 at Jim Durrell Recreation Centre in Ottawa, Ontario. The tournament champions qualified for the 2018 Royal Bank Cup, held in Chilliwack, BC and hosted by the BCHL's Chilliwack Chiefs at the Prospera Centre.

== Teams ==
- Ottawa Jr. Senators (Host and CCHL Champions)

Regular season: 46-9-2-5 (1st CCHL Yzerman Division)
Playoffs: Defeated Pembroke Lumber Kings 4-2, Defeated Brockville Braves 4-3, Defeated Carleton Place Canadians 4-1 to win the league.

- Carleton Place Canadians (CCHL Runner-up)

Regular Season: 53-5-1-3 (1st CCHL Robinson Division)
Playoffs: Defeated Rockland Nationals 4-1, Defeated Hawkesbury Hawks 4-0, Lost to Ottawa Jr. Senators 4-1.

- Longueuil Collège Français (QJHL Champions)

Regular Season: 38-8-0-3 (1st LHJQ Martin St-Louis Division)
Playoffs: Defeated Montreal-Est Rangers 4-0, Defeated Granby Inouk 4-0, Defeated Terrebone Cobras 4-1 to win the league.

- Edmundston Blizzard (MHL Champions)

Regular Season: 36-10-4-0 (1st MHL North Division)
Playoffs: Defeated Miramichi Timberwolves 4-0, Defeated Summerside Western Capitals 4-3, Defeated Yarmouth Mariners 4-2 to win league.

== Tournament ==
=== Round Robin ===
x = Clinched championship round berth; y = Clinched first overall

FPC Round Robin
Rank	Team	League	W-OTW-L-OTL	GF	GA	Pts.
1	Ottawa Jr. Senators (host)	CCHL	2-1-0-0	10	5	8
2	Longueuil College Francais	QJHL	2-0-0-1	10	7	7
3	Edmundston Blizzard	MHL	1-0-2-0	9	13	3
4	Carleton Place Canadians	CCHL	0-0-3-0	6	10	0

Tie Breaker: Head-to-Head, then 3-way +/-.

==== Results ====
Round Robin results
Game	Away team	Score	Home team	Score	Notes
1	Carleton Place Canadians	1	Longueuil College Francais	2	Regulation
2	Edmundston Blizzard	1	Ottawa Jr. Senators	4	Regulation
3	Longueuil College Francais	6	Edmundston Blizzard	3	-
4	Carleton Place Canadians	2	Ottawa Jr. Senators	3	-
5	Carleton Place Canadians	3	Edmundston Blizzard	5	-
6	Ottawa Jr. Senators	3	Longueuil College Francais	2	2OT

=== Semifinals and final ===
Championship Round
Game	Away team	Score	Home team	Score	Notes
Saturday May 5
Semi-final	Edmundston Blizzard	1	Longueuil College Francais	5	-
Sunday May 6
Final	Longueuil College Francais	1	Ottawa Jr. Senators	10	
