= Fred Page Cup =

Canadian hockey competition

- Sport: Ice hockey
- League: Canadian Junior Hockey League
- Awarded for: Eastern region champion
- Country: Canada

History
- First award: 1995
- Most wins: Carleton Place Canadians (3)
- Most recent: Ottawa Jr. Senators (2019) (2nd title)

The Fred Page Cup was a championship ice hockey trophy, won by a tournament conducted by the Canadian Junior Hockey League. The award was given to the winner of a round-robin and playoff between the Bogart Cup champions of the Central Canada Hockey League, the Kent Cup champions of the Maritime Junior Hockey League, La Coupe NAPA Champions of the Quebec Junior Hockey League, and a predetermined host team. The winner of the Fred Page Cup moves on to the Centennial Cup, the national Junior A championship. The trophy was donated by the then-called Quebec Provincial Junior Hockey League in 1994–95.

== History ==
The first Fred Page Cup was awarded in 1995. The trophy was donated by the Quebec Provincial Junior A Hockey League to create an Eastern Canadian Championship in honour of past Canadian Amateur Hockey Association President Fred Page. The 1995 Championship marked the first time teams outside of the maritime provinces were allowed to compete for the Eastern Canadian Championship for a berth to the National Championship. Now allowed are the maritime champions, the Quebec champions, and the Ottawa District champions of the Central Canada Hockey League. Prior to 1995, the Callaghan Cup was the championship trophy of Eastern Canada to be played for by a representative of the maritime provinces. Early championships were dominated by the Island Junior Hockey League. In the early 1990s, the top teams of the IJHL jumped to the Maritime Junior A Hockey League.

The Ottawa Jr. Senators were awarded the 2003 Fred Page Cup in the fall of 2001, but over the summer of 2002, the tournament was awarded the Cornwall Colts instead. This was mostly due to the size of the Jr. Senators arena and the conflict with other groups, therefore the event couldn't be attainable. The Nepean Raiders surprisingly never bid for the tournament, despite reaching the league finals eight times between 2003 and 2013. The event could not be supported with a low fan-base and reaching an agreement with the city. The 2006 Fred Page Cup was then awarded to Pembroke, Ontario and the Pembroke Lumber Kings.

To date, the Central Canada Hockey League has won the Fred Page Cup seven times, winning the Royal Bank Cup finals once, (Pembroke Lumber Kings) since its inception in 1996. The Quebec Junior Hockey League has won the Fred Page Cup only three times, and no team from Quebec have qualified for the Royal Bank Cup finals. The Maritime Junior A Hockey League is the only league to win the Fred Page Cup and have teams win the Royal Bank Cup, as the Summerside Capitals won in 1997 and the Halifax Oland Exports won in 2002.

The 2010 Fred Page Cup was awarded to the Brockville Braves, who also hosted the tournament in 1997. Brockville won the 2010 Fred Page Cup by defeating the Pembroke Lumber Kings 5–1. The Braves are the second host team since the 1998–99 Charlottetown Abbies, who defeated the CCHL's Hawkesbury Hawks 2–0 at the Charlottetown Civic Centre. The Pembroke Lumber Kings are the only team to compete in six consecutive Fred Page Cup tournaments from 2006 to 2011, winning the tournament twice in 2007 and 2011, and losing the finals in 2006 and 2008.

In 2009, the traditional circulation was broken, when Dieppe, New Brunswick, and the Dieppe Commandos were awarded the tournament instead of a team from the Central Canada Hockey League. Maritime Hockey League champions Summerside Western Capitals elected to play their Fred Page Cup games in Summerside, Prince Edward Island, but this idea was quickly nixed because of a disagreement from the Quebec Junior Hockey League champion Sherbrooke Cougars.

The Kanata Stallions were chosen to host the 2012 Fred Page Cup, despite the team's poor performances since re-branding from the Kanata Valley Lasers in 2002. The Stallions managed to qualify for the semi-finals and avoided elimination with an over-time win over their crosstown rivals Nepean Raiders. The Kanata Stallions finished in third place in the tournament.

The Carleton Place Canadians became the first team to win back-to-back Fred Page Cup championships during the tournament's inception in 1996. They continued their streak with three straight wins from 2014 to 2016.

The 2018 tournament was awarded to Ottawa, which made it the second time the tournament was played in the Ottawa area. Pembroke placed a bid, but was passed over in favor of Ottawa. Smiths Falls placed a bid, but withdrew.

== Champions ==
Year	Champions	Runners-up	Host team	City
1995	Joliette Nationals (QPJHL)	Cornwall Colts (CJHL)	Joliette Nationals (QPJHL)	Joliette, QC
1996	Moncton Beavers (MJAHL)	Dartmouth Oland Exports (MJAHL)	Dartmouth Oland Exports (MJAHL)	Dartmouth, NS
1997	Kanata Valley Lasers (CJHL)	Longueuil Collège Français (QPJHL)	Brockville Braves (CJHL)	Brockville, ON
1998	Brockville Braves (CJHL)	Restigouche River Rats (MJAHL)	Joliette Nationals (QJAAAHL)	Joliette, QC
1999	Charlottetown Abbies (MJAHL)	Hawkesbury Hawks (CJHL)	Charlottetown Abbies (MJAHL)	Charlottetown, PEI
2000	Cornwall Colts (CJHL)	Halifax Oland Exports (MJAHL)	Pembroke Lumber Kings (CJHL)	Pembroke, ON
2001	St. Jerome Panthers (QJAAAHL)	Cornwall Colts (CJHL)	Coaticook Frontaliers (QJAAAHL)	Coaticook, QC
2002	Halifax Oland Exports (MJAHL)	Ottawa Jr. Senators (CJHL)	Truro Bearcats (MJAHL)	Truro, NS
2003	Lennoxville Cougars (QJAAAHL)	Nepean Raiders (CJHL)	Cornwall Colts (CJHL)	Cornwall, ON
2004	Nepean Raiders (CJHL)	Valleyfield Braves (QJAAAHL)	Valleyfield Braves (QJAAAHL)	Valleyfield, QC
2005	Hawkesbury Hawks (CJHL)	Yarmouth Mariners (MJAHL)	Yarmouth Mariners (MJAHL)	Yarmouth, NS
2006	Joliette Action (QJAAAHL)	Pembroke Lumber Kings (CJHL)	Pembroke Lumber Kings (CJHL)	Pembroke, ON
2007	Pembroke Lumber Kings (CJHL)	St-Jérôme Panthers (QJAAHL)	St-Jérôme Panthers (QJAAHL)	St-Jérôme, QC
2008	Pictou County Crushers (MJAHL)	Pembroke Lumber Kings (CJHL)	Pictou County Crushers (MJAHL)	New Glasgow, NS
2009	Summerside Western Capitals (MJAHL)	Dieppe Commandos (MJAHL)	Dieppe Commandos (MJAHL)	Moncton, NB
2010	Brockville Braves (CJHL)	Pembroke Lumber Kings (CJHL)	Brockville Braves (CJHL)	Brockville, ON
2011	Pembroke Lumber Kings (CCHL)	Longueuil College Francais (QJAAAHL)	Terrebonne Cobras (QJAAAHL)	Terrebonne, QC
2012	Woodstock Slammers (MHL)	Nepean Raiders (CCHL)	Kanata Stallions (CCHL)	Ottawa, ON
2013	Truro Bearcats (MHL)	Summerside Western Capitals (MHL)	Truro Bearcats	Truro, NS
2014	Carleton Place Canadians (CCHL)	St-Jérôme Panthers (QJAAAHL)	St-Jérôme Panthers (QJAAAHL)	St-Jérôme, QC
2015	Carleton Place Canadians (CCHL)	Dieppe Commandos (MHL)	Cornwall Colts (CCHL)	Cornwall, ON
2016	Carleton Place Canadians (CCHL)	Woodstock Slammers (MHL)	Woodstock Slammers (MHL)	Woodstock, NB
2017	Terrebonne Cobras (QJHL)	Carleton Place Canadians (CCHL)	Terrebonne Cobras (QJHL)	Terrebonne, QC
2018	Ottawa Jr. Senators (CCHL)	Longueuil College Francais (QJHL)	Ottawa Jr. Senators (CCHL)	Ottawa, ON
2019	Ottawa Jr. Senators (CCHL)	Princeville Titans (QJHL)	Amherst Ramblers (MHL)	Amherst, NS
2020	Cancelled due to COVID-19 pandemic (Note: Hockey Canada and the CJHL cancelled the 2020 and 2021 Fred Page Cups in response to the coronavirus pandemic)		Saint-Jerome Panthers (QJHL)	Saint-Jérôme, Quebec
2021	Cancelled due to COVID-19 pandemic		Hawkesbury Hawks (CCHL)	Hawkesbury, ON
2022	Not played—all league champions advanced to directly to Centennial Cup			
2023	Not played—all league champions advanced to directly to Centennial Cup			
