= QJHL =

QJHL may refer to:

- Quebec Junior Hockey League, founded 1988, Quebec's Junior A hockey league
- Quebec Major Junior Hockey League, founded 1969, Quebec's Major Junior hockey league
