= Valleyfield =

Valleyfield may refer to:

- Valleyfield, Fife, Scotland
- Valleyfield, Newfoundland and Labrador, Canada
- Valleyfield, Prince Edward Island, a community in Prince Edward Island
- Salaberry-de-Valleyfield, Quebec, historically referred to in English as Valleyfield.
- Valleyfield (HBC vessel), chartered by the Hudson's Bay Company from 1831–1843, see Hudson's Bay Company vessels

== See also ==
- Valleyfield Braves (disambiguation)
- HMCS Valleyfield (K329)
