= Nepean Raiders =

Central Canada Hockey League team in Ontario, Canada

- City: Ottawa, Ontario, Canada
- League: Central Canada Hockey League
- Division: East Division
- Founded: 1966
- Home arena: Nepean Sportsplex
- Colours: Red, black, white
- Owners: Rob Kinghan, Sue Collis and Chris White
- General manager: Todd Reid
- Head coach: Mark Cavallin
- Media: FloSports

The Nepean Raiders (French: Raiders de Nepean) are a Junior A ice hockey team based in Ottawa, Ontario. The Raiders compete in the Central Canada Hockey League (CCHL) as a member of the East Division. The team plays its home games at the Nepean Sportsplex.

The franchise was formed in 1966 in the Central Junior A Hockey League. The Raiders saw success immediately, winning the Bogart Cup in 1971, and have made the finals multiple times between 1972 and 1981. In the 1980s. Steve Yzerman and Darren Pang are still known for being the most-outstanding Raiders in the early era. The Raiders struggled in the 1980s and 1990s missing the playoffs multiple times, and set a season-record for the most-penalized CJHL team in 1995–96.

== History ==
The Nepean Raiders came under new ownership with Gord Black in 1998. Black had previously attempted to purchase the Ottawa 67's. Black introduced a new logo, similar to the one used by the Prince Albert Raiders of the Western Hockey League, that was discontinued in 2014, with minor alterations. This logo was discontinued in 2009 when new ownership took over the Raiders organization, but still used as an alternate logo as the previous logo was revived.

In 2002–03, the Nepean Raiders broke a 22-year old championship appearance drought by winning the semi-finals against the Gloucester Rangers in 7 games. The Art Bogart Cup final was an easy task for the Raiders winning the series in 5 games against rival Ottawa Junior Senators. At the Fred Page Cup in Cornwall, the Raiders finished 3rd and knocked off the hosts Cornwall Colts in the semi-finals, and lost the final to the Lennoxville Cougars.

The 2003–04 season saw 13 returning players poised to defend their championship season from before. The Raiders won a hard-fought series with the Gloucester Rangers, where game 7 was a nervous showdown where Nepean held on for a 1–0 win sending them to the Fred Page Cup in Valleyfield, Quebec. Nepean dropped the first 2 games to the Valleyfield Braves (4–0) and the Saint-Eustache Gladiateurs (6–4). Nepean and the Campbellton Tigers went into the final game winless, and Nepean won 3–1 to go to the semi-finals where they defeated Saint-Eustache 3–2 in double overtime. Nepean won the finals 4–0 against Valleyfield to earn a trip to the Royal Bank Cup in Grande Prairie, Alberta. Nepean won their first game 5–4 against the Nanaimo Clippers of the BCHL, where they rallied back from a 4–0 deficit to win in overtime. Nepean improved their record to 2–0 after winning 2–0 against the Kindersley Klippers of the SJHL. However, the Raiders dropped to 2–1 after losing to the hosts Grande Prairie Storm 4–2. Their final round robin contest came against the top-ranked Aurora Tigers of the OPJHL, losing 3–1. The same teams met in the semi-final, and Aurora won 7–2 thus making the Raiders the 5th different CCHL team to fail to make the national championship.

The 2004–05 season saw the Nepean Raiders finish strong, but the Art Bogart Cup finals saw an intense series against the Hawkesbury Hawks, who finished three spots behind the Raiders. Game 7 was played in a neutral venue, because the ice was removed from Nepean Sportsplex, so Game 7 was held at the Kanata Recreation Centre instead. A record was broke in this game for the fastest five goals in a playoff game as Hawkesbury won 6–1.

Nepean returned from a devastating finish from the 2004–05 season and used the 2005–06 season to rebuild. Although, the Raiders finished 3rd overall, they had to deal with the Brockville Braves, who were up 3–1 in the series and Nepean came back to force a Game 7. With the game tied 2–2, Raiders forward Matt Valois scored the winner with 5 seconds left in regulation to avoid sudden death overtime. The Pembroke Lumber Kings, who were ranked #1 nationally awaited to the Raiders, and this series saw the Lumber Kings up 3–1, and Nepean coming back to win in seven games. However, the Raiders re-matched against the Hawkesbury Hawks, but lost the series in 6 games.

The summer of 2006 saw head coach and general manager Chris Byrne leave the team to accept a coaching position with the Ottawa 67's. Afterwards, this led to Gord Black putting the team up for sale. A replacement was found with Archie Mulligan, who was once the coach for the Kanata Valley Lasers, who had an impressive resume with a 15-year stint with the Valley Lasers, and an appearance in two national championships. In the end, Nepean finished 4th overall and lose to the Pembroke Lumber Kings in the finals.

The 2007–08 season started off strangely, as Archie Mulligan left the team early in the season and scrambling for a replacement. The Raiders went through three coaches and lost the first quarter-finals series for the first time since 2000. Nepean came under new ownership over the summer with Arnie Vered and Brian Altshuller. CBC commentator Garry Galley was hired as head coach. Nepean finished 1st overall, and lost the finals to Pembroke in 5 games.

In December 2009, Garry Galley left the team abruptly over disagreements with upper management, leaving players demanding trades and wanting to be released.

The 2011–12 was a breakthrough for Nepean, as they finished 1st overall (second time under new ownership). However, they almost let the semi-final series slip out of their hands against the Pembroke Lumber Kings, who were up 3–1 and Nepean ultimately won the series in 7 games.

Nepean ended its nearly 20-year playoff streak in 2016 when the Raiders failed to make the playoffs for the first time since 1994–95. Goaltender Francois Marotte broke a league record for the most minutes played (3220) in one season.

In June 2024, it was announced that the Raiders franchise would be sold from Bryan and Liz Altshuller to Rob Kinghan, Sue Collis, and Chris White.

== Season-by-season record ==
Note: GP = Games Played, W = Wins, L = Losses, T = Ties, OTL = Overtime Losses, GF = Goals for, GA = Goals against

Season	GP	W	L	T	OTL	GF	GA	Points	Finish	Playoffs
1972–73	55	22	32	1	-	214	268	45	5th CJHL	
1973–74	50	26	18	6	-	287	236	58	2nd CJHL	
1974–75	50	23	17	10	-	254	216	54	4th CJHL	
1975–76	50	16	27	7	-	186	240	39	5th CJHL	
1976–77	50	28	13	9	-	263	193	65	1st CJHL	
1977–78	48	24	20	4	-	258	205	52	3rd CJHL	
1978–79	48	36	10	2	-	305	187	74	1st CJHL	Lost final 4–3 to Hawkesbury
1979–80	50	25	22	3	-	312	260	53	3rd CJHL	
1980–81	50	29	13	8	-	281	206	66	1st CJHL	
1981–82	50	21	22	7	-	253	260	51	4th CJHL	
1982–83	50	12	31	7	-	194	258	31	7th CJHL	
1983–84	54	28	17	9	-	278	251	65	1st CJHL	
1984–85	54	20	30	2	2	226	286	44	5th CJHL	
1985–86	60	36	21	2	1	302	251	75	3rd CJHL	
1986–87	52	30	21	1	0	266	207	61	2nd CJHL	
1987–88	56	29	17	5	5	249	246	68	4th CJHL	
1988–89	55	25	30	0	0	216	262	50	7th CJHL	
1989–90	55	19	33	2	1	228	274	41	7th CJHL	
1990–91	55	25	23	3	4	242	236	57	5th CJHL	
1991–92	57	26	23	1	6	274	261	59	6th CJHL	
1992–93	57	32	19	3	3	285	258	70	4th CJHL	
1993–94	57	31	21	2	3	306	290	67	4th CJHL	
1994–95	54	10	38	4	2	214	326	26	10th CJHL	Out of Playoffs
1995–96	54	14	35	5	0	220	315	33	5th in East	Out of Playoffs
1996–97	53	27	23	3	0	232	223	57	4th in East	Lost quarter-finals 4–1 to Smiths Falls
1997–98	56	20	23	13	10	180	180	63	4th in East	Lost quarter-finals 4–1 to Brockville
1998–99	54	31	21	2	0	202	194	64	3rd in East	Lost semi-final 4–1 to Hawkesbury
1999–00	56	33	20	3	0	245	239	69	2nd in East	Lost quarter-final 4–1 to Kanata
2000–01	55	26	19	10	0	222	186	63	3rd in East	Lost semi-final 4–0 to Cornwall
2001–02	55	34	11	10	0	263	174	78	2nd	Lost semi-final 4–2 to Ottawa
2002–03	55	32	17	6	2	227	185	72	1st in East	Won league 4–1 over Ottawa
2003–04	55	37	14	3	1	229	144	78	1st	Won league 4–3 over Gloucester
2004–05	57	42	9	3	3	225	131	90	1st	Lost final 4–3 to Hawkesbury
2005–06	59	37	16	3	3	231	174	80	2nd in East	Lost final 4–2 to Hawkesbury
2006–07	55	26	21	6	2	178	165	60	3rd in East	Lost final 4–1 to Pembroke
2007–08	60	32	23	3	2	233	203	69	5th CJHL	Lost quarter-final 4–2 to Brockville
2008–09	60	42	12	-	6	261	145	90	1st CJHL	Lost final 4–2 to Pembroke
2009–10	62	33	26	-	3	250	217	69	6th CJHL	Lost quarter-final 4–2 to Cornwall
2010–11	62	27	25	-	10	207	227	64	6th CCHL	Lost quarter-final 4–3 to Brockville
2011–12	62	46	11	-	5	269	159	97	1st CCHL	Won League 4–3 over Cornwall
2012–13	62	38	20	-	4	235	182	80	4th CCHL	Lost final 4–2 to Colts
2013–14	62	27	24	-	11	189	225	65	7th CCHL	Lost quarter-final 0–4 Bears
2014–15	62	23	35	-	4	169	215	50	4th of 6 East; 10th of 12 CCHL	Won Prelim. Round 2–1 (Bears); Lost quarter-final 0–4 (Canadians)
2015–16	62	23	33	5	1	156	198	50	4th of 6 East; 10th of 12 CCHL	DNQ
2016–17	62	24	33	5	0	171	222	53	2nd of 6 East; 8th of 12 CCHL	Lost quarter-final 1–4 (Canadians)
2017–18	62	24	32	2	4	169	196	54	5th of 6 East; 9th of 12 CCHL	Did not qualify for playoffs
2018–19	62	12	47	3	0	123	272	27	6th of 6 East; 12th of 12 CCHL	Did not qualify for playoffs
2019–20	62	11	48	3	0	148	279	25	6th of 6 East; 12th of 12 CCHL	Did not qualify for playoffs
2020-21	Season cancelled due to COVID-19 pandemic restrictions									
2021–22	55	12	41	2	0	159	303	26	6th of 6 East; 12th of 12 CCHL	Did not qualify for playoffs
2022–23	55	12	39	1	3	138	262	28	6th of 6 East; 11th of 12 CCHL	Did not qualify for playoffs
2023–24	55	20	28	5	2	152	204	47	6th of 6 East; 11th of 12 CCHL	Did not qualify for playoffs
2024–25	55	16	33	5	1	183	239	38	6th of 6 Yzerman; 11th of 12 CCHL	Did not qualify for playoffs
2025-26	55	17	33	2	3	179	244	39	6th of 6 Yzerman; 11th of 12 CCHL	Did not qualify for playoffs

== Attendance ==
As of March 12, 2025

Season	Games	Total	Average
2006–07	31	5,890	190
2007–08	31	7,254	234
2008–09	31	7,533	243
2009–10	31	7,378	238
2010–11	31	8,587	277
2011–12	31	7,099	229
2012–13	31	5,735	185
2013–14	31	6,045	195
2014–15	31	5,487	177
2015–16	31	5,642	182
2016–17	31	3,496	113
2017–18	27	2,592	96
2018–19	29	6,206	214
2019–20	28	2,570	92
2020–21	DID NOT PLAY DUE TO COVID-19 PANDEMIC		
2021–22	26	2,296	88
2022–23	25	2,813	113
2023–24	26	3,758	145
2024–25	27	3,808	141

== Fred Page Cup ==
Eastern Canada Championships
MHL - QAAAJHL - CCHL - Host
Round robin play with 2nd vs 3rd in semi-final to advance against 1st in the finals.

Year	Round Robin	Record	Standing	Semifinal	Gold Medal Game
2003	L, Lennoxville Cougars 2–5; W, Charlottetown Abbies 3–1; L, Campbellton Tigers 3–2	1–2–0	3rd of 4	W, Cornwall Colts 3–2	L, Lennoxville Cougars 0–4
2004	L, Valleyfield Braves 0–4; L, St. Eustace Gladiators 4–6; W, Cornwall Colts 1–2	1–2–0	3rd of 4	W, St. Eustace Gladiators 3–2	W, Valleyfield Braves 4–0; Fred Page Cup Champions advance to Royal Bank Cup
2012	W, Princeville Titans 4–0; OTL, Kanata Stallions 1–2; L, Woodstock Slammers 2–3	1–1–1	3rd of 4	W, Kanata Stallions 6–1	L, Woodstock Slammers 2–3

== Royal Bank Cup ==
CANADIAN NATIONAL CHAMPIONSHIPS
Dudley Hewitt Champions - Central, Fred Page Champions - Eastern, Western Canada Cup Champions - Western, Western Canada Cup - Runners Up and Host
Round robin play with top 4 in semi-final and winners to finals.

Year	Round Robin	Record	Standing	Semifinal	Gold Medal Game
2004	2OTW, Nanaimo Clippers 4–3; W, Kindersley Klippers 2–1; L, Grande Prairie Storm 2–7; L, Aurora Tigers 1–3	2–2	4th of 5	L, Aurora Tigers 2–7	n/a

== Championships ==
CJHL Bogart Cup Championships: 2003, 2004
Eastern Canadian Fred Page Cup Championships: 2004
CJAHL Royal Bank Cup Championships: None

== Notable alumni ==
- Adrian Aucoin
- Jamie Baker
- Andrew Calof
- Jeff Chychrun
- Grant Clitsome
- Rob Dopson
- Mike Eastwood
- Mike Eaves
- Stew Gavin
- Ben Hutton
- Mike Meeker
- Tyler Moss
- Darren Pang
- Mark Paterson
- Dan Ratushny
- Keith Redmond
- Joe Reekie
- Travis Scott
- Larry Skinner
- Doug Smith
- Aaron Ward
- Jason York
- Steve Yzerman
- MacKenzie Weegar
- Jonathan Zion
