= Réal Lemieux =

Canadian ice hockey player

- Born: January 3, 1945 Victoriaville, Quebec, Canada
- Died: October 24, 1975 (aged 30) Sorel, Quebec, Canada
- Height: 5 ft 11 in (180 cm)
- Weight: 172 lb (78 kg; 12 st 4 lb)
- Position: Right wing
- Shot: Left
- Played for: Detroit Red Wings; Los Angeles Kings; New York Rangers; Buffalo Sabres
- Playing career: 1965–1974

Réal Gaston Lemieux (January 3, 1945 – October 24, 1975) was a Canadian ice hockey right wing. He played in the National Hockey League for the Detroit Red Wings, Los Angeles Kings, New York Rangers and Buffalo Sabres between 1967 and 1974.

== Early life ==
Lemieux was born in Victoriaville, Quebec. He played junior for the Lachine Maroons and the Hamilton Red Wings from 1962 until 1965.

== Professional career ==
Lemieux turned professional with the Detroit Red Wings, playing several seasons with their minor league teams, and one game with Detroit. Lemieux was claimed by Los Angeles in the 1967 NHL Expansion Draft and became a regular with the Kings. Lemieux was traded to the New York Rangers in 1969 but was re-acquired after playing 55 games with the Rangers. In 1973–74, Lemieux played for the Kings, Rangers and Sabres. In his NHL career, the vast majority of which was spent with Los Angeles, Lemieux played in 483 games, scoring 51 goals and adding 104 assists.

== Retirement and death ==
After being cut by the Sabres in 1974, Lemieux decided to retire and joined a steel company in Sorel, Quebec. In October 1975, he developed a blood clot in his brain and died on October 24 of that year.

== Career statistics ==
=== Regular season and playoffs ===
			Regular season					Playoffs
Season	Team	League	GP	G	A	Pts	PIM	GP	G	A	Pts	PIM
1962–63	Lachine Maroons	MMJHL	—	—	—	—	—	—	—	—	—	—
1963–64	Hamilton Red Wings	OHA	42	20	24	44	58	—	—	—	—	—
1964–65	Hamilton Red Wings	OHA	48	48	40	88	64	—	—	—	—	—
1964–65	Memphis Wings	CPHL	8	5	7	12	0	—	—	—	—	—
1965–66	Memphis Wings	CPHL	53	11	15	26	68	—	—	—	—	—
1966–67	Detroit Red Wings	NHL	1	0	0	0	0	—	—	—	—	—
1966–67	Memphis Wings	CPHL	68	28	34	62	211	7	4	0	4	7
1967–68	Los Angeles Kings	NHL	74	12	23	35	60	7	1	1	2	0
1968–69	Los Angeles Kings	NHL	75	11	29	40	68	11	1	3	4	10
1969–70	New York Rangers	NHL	55	4	6	10	51	—	—	—	—	—
1969–70	Los Angeles Kings	NHL	18	2	4	6	10	—	—	—	—	—
1970–71	Los Angeles Kings	NHL	43	3	6	9	2	—	—	—	—	—
1970–71	Springfield Kings	AHL	33	14	22	36	25	—	—	—	—	—
1971–72	Los Angeles Kings	NHL	78	13	25	38	28	—	—	—	—	—
1972–73	Los Angeles Kings	NHL	74	5	10	15	19	—	—	—	—	—
1973–74	Los Angeles Kings	NHL	20	0	0	0	0	—	—	—	—	—
1973–74	New York Rangers	NHL	7	0	0	0	0	—	—	—	—	—
1973–74	Buffalo Sabres	NHL	11	1	1	2	4	—	—	—	—	—
NHL totals			456	51	104	155	262	18	2	4	6	10
