= Valleyfield Braves =

Valleyfield Braves may refer to:

- Valleyfield Braves (defunct) - Evolved in the Quebec Provincial Hockey League, Quebec Senior Hockey League and the Quebec Hockey League in the 1940s and 1950s. Reborn as a Quebec Junior Hockey League team in 1998 (former Chateauguay Elites), defunct after a brief stint in the Ligue Nord-Américaine de Hockey in 2013.
- Valleyfield Braves (2014–) - Current Quebec Junior Hockey League team, originally founded in 2004 as the St. Lawrence College of Québec Lions.
