= Montreal Phoenix =

Canadian junior hockey team

- City: Pierrefonds-Roxboro, Quebec, Canada
- League: LHJQ / QJHL
- Founded: 2003
- Home arena: Sportplexe Pierrefonds
- Colours: Black, Red, White, and Gold
- Mascot: Blaze
- Owner: N/A
- President: N/A
- General manager: Manni Leo
- Head coach: Michaël Prégent (October 21, 2025)
- Captain: Zachary Chapleau-Yelle
- Media: Instagram: @PhoenixDeMontreal
- Website: PhoenixMontreal.com

Franchise history
- 2003–2004: Île Perrot Mustangs
- 2004–2017: Vaudreuil-Dorion Mustangs
- 2017–2018: Revolution de Saint-Lazare
- 2018–2019: Revolution du Lac Saint-Louis
- 2019–2022: West Island Shamrocks
- 2022–present: Montreal Phoenix

The Montreal Phoenix (Les Phoenix de Montréal) are an ice hockey team based in Pierrefonds, Quebec They are a part of the

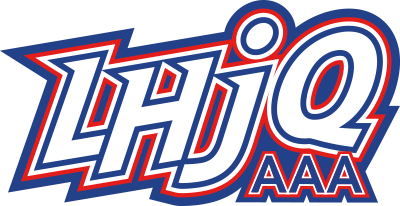

Quebec Junior AAA Hockey League. The franchise was founded in 2003 as the Île Perrot Mustangs but re-located to Vaudreuil-Dorion in 2004, and then relocated to Lac Saint Louis, known as the Revolution in 2017. The franchise has a new look in 2019 as the West Island Shamrocks. After 2022 they moved to Montreal and rebranded as Montreal Phoenix

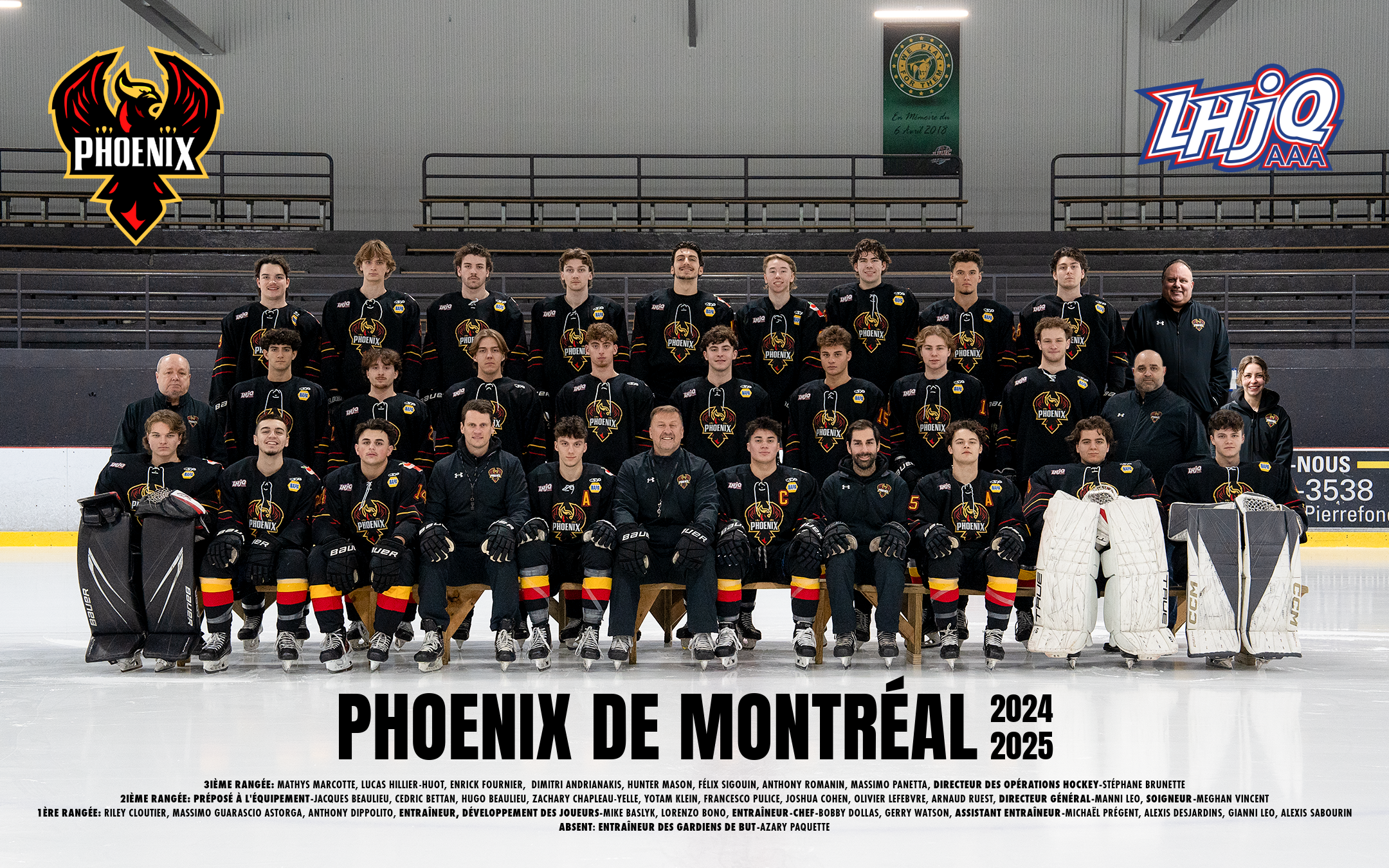
Montreal Phoenix 2024–2025

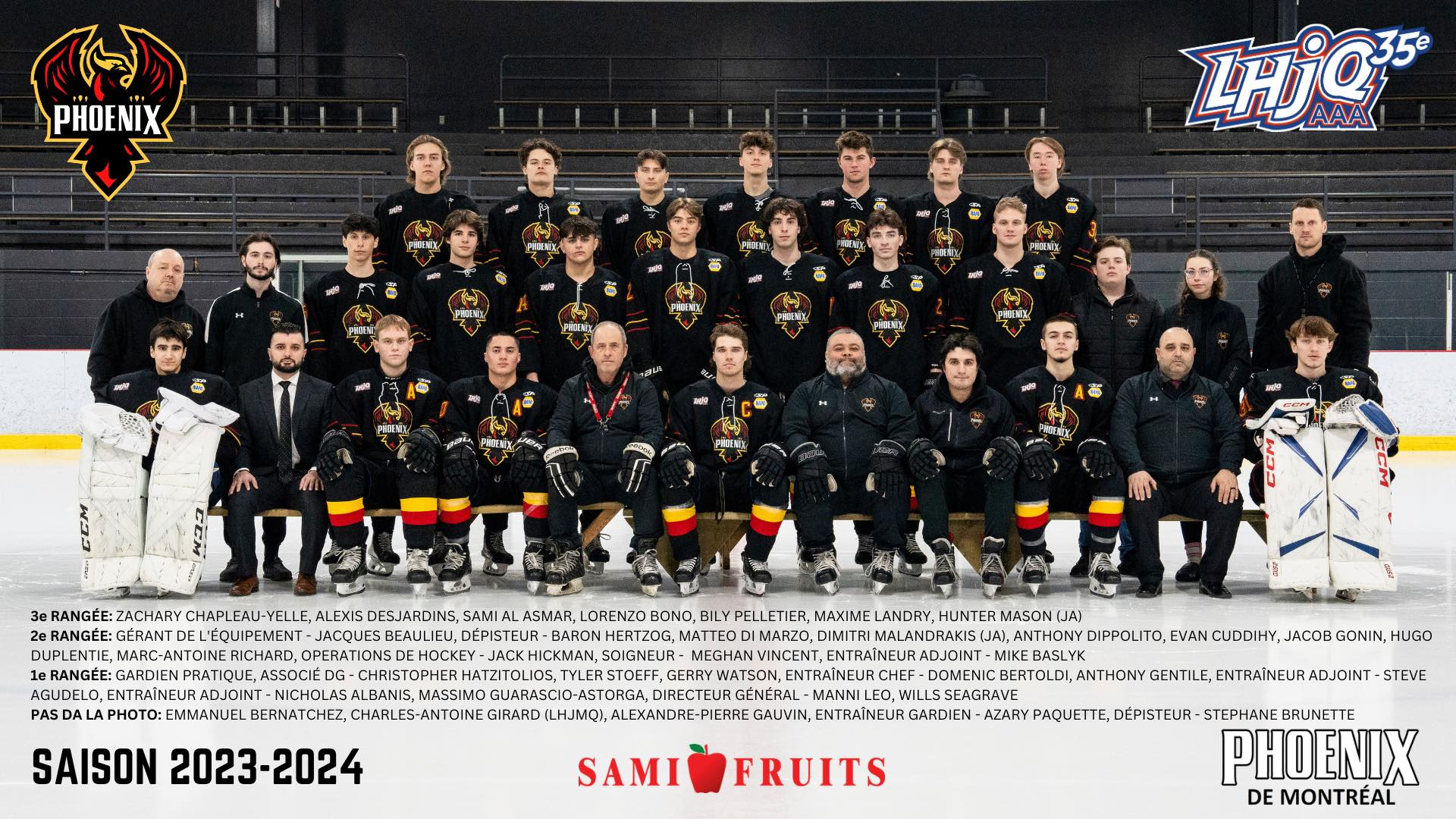
Montreal Phoenix 2023-2024

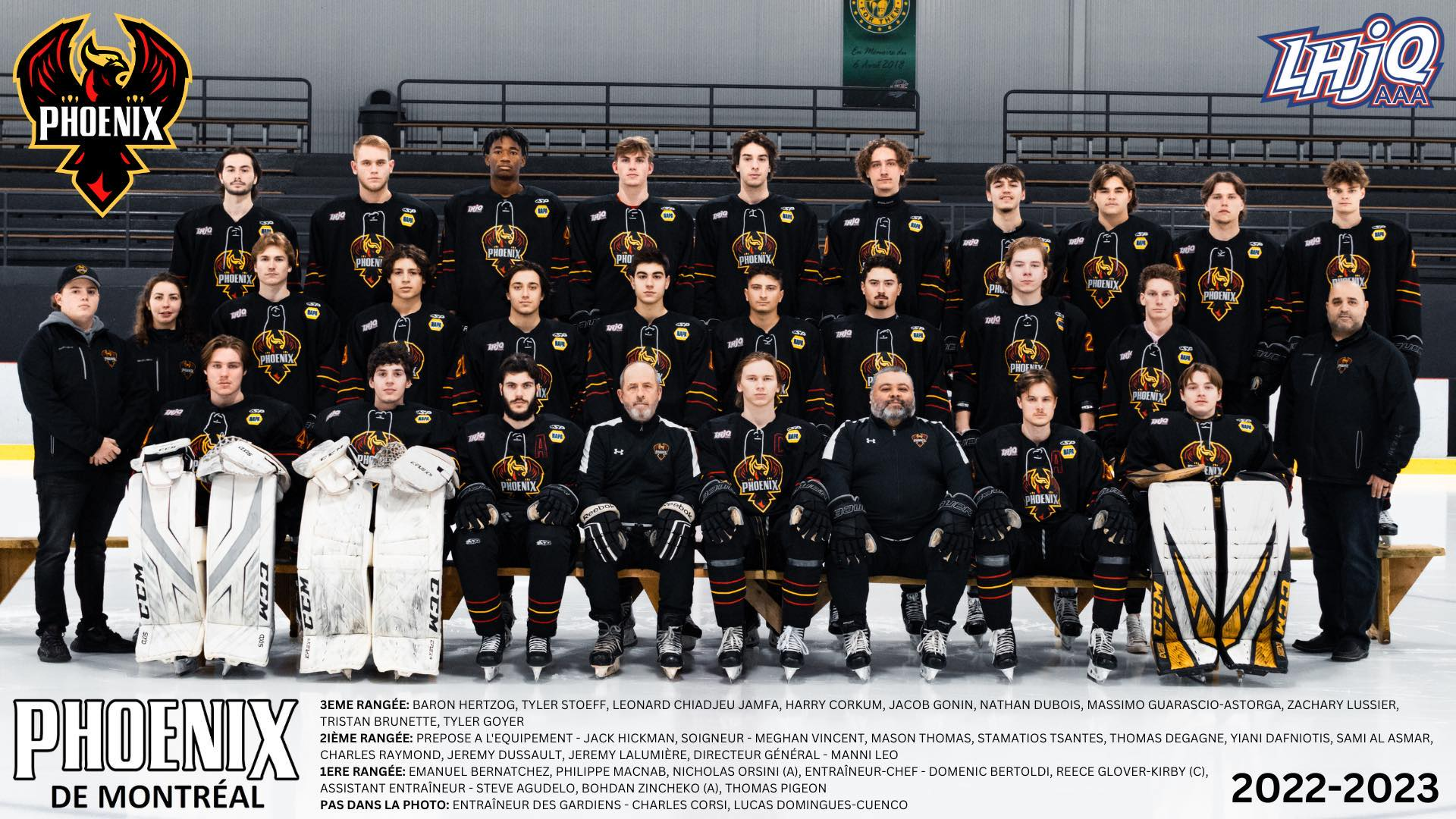
Montreal Phoenix 2022-2023

== Season-by-season record ==
Note: GP = Games Played, W = Wins, L = Losses, T = Ties, OTL = Overtime Losses, GF = Goals for, GA = Goals against, Pts = Points

Season	GP	W	L	T	OTL	GF	GA	Pts	Results	Playoffs
l’Ile Perrot Mustangs
2003–04	50	9	35	2	4	174	294	24	12th QJAAAHL	
Vaudreuil-Dorion Mustangs
2004–05	48	29	13	1	5	217	186	64	3rd QJAAAHL	Won League
2005–06	51	30	16	0	5	235	193	65	6th QJAAAHL	Lost quarter-final
2006–07	54	12	39	2	1	188	306	27	13th QJAAAHL	Did not qualify
2007–08	52	10	39	3	0	195	344	43	12th QJAAAHL	
2008–09	49	20	26	—	3	216	246	43	12th QJAAAHL	
2009–10	51	15	35	—	1	205	306	31	13th QJAAAHL	Did not qualify
2010–11	49	24	22	—	3	223	230	51	7th QJAAAHL	Lost Preliminary
2011–12	49	13	33	—	3	209	349	29	13th QJAAAHL	Did not qualify
2012–13	52	19	30	—	3	217	297	41	13th QJAAAHL	Did not qualify
2013–14	52	20	29	—	3	216	276	43	6th QJAAAHL-PB	Lost div. quarter-final
2014–15	52	27	21	-	4	272	270	58	3rd of 5 Burrows; 7th of 14 QJHL	Won Elimination Round, 3-0 (Cobras); Won quarter-final, 4-1 (Panthers); Lost semifinal, 3-4 (Cougars)
2015–16	49	10	17	4	2	219	201	68	3rd of 6 St. Louis; 7th of 12 QJHL	Lost div. semi-final, 0–4 (Inouk)
2016–17	55	10	31	6	2	160	272	28	6th of 6 St. Louis; 12th of 12 QJHL	Did not qualify
Saint-Lazare Revolution
2017–18	49	10	34	4	1	128	237	25	6th of 6 St. Louis; 11th of 12 QJHL	Did not qualify
Lac St-Louis Revolution
2018–19	48	12	31	0	5	138	210	29	12th of 13, LHJQ	10th (1-5-0-0) X-over Rd did not advance
West Island Shamrocks
2019–20	48	13	32	2	1	138	210	29	5th of 6 Trevi; 10th of 12, LHJQ	Did Not Qualify
2020–21	Season canceled due to COVID-19 restrictions									
2021–22	42	0	41	0	1	102	371	1	4th of 4 West; 12th of 12, LHJQ	Did Not Qualify
Montréal Phoenix
2022–23	48	4	43	1	0	138	316	9	13th of 13, LHJQ	Did Not Qualify
2023–24	48	11	31	2	1	171	253	25	12th of 13, LHJQ	Did Not Qualify
2024–25	48	21	25	2	0	156	191	44	10th of 13, LHJQ	Lost First Round 0-2 (Rangers)
2025-26	48	18	26	3	1	175	235	40	10th of 13, LHJQ	Lost First Round 1-2 (Granby)
