= Chambly Forts =

- City: Chambly, Quebec, Canada
- League: Quebec Junior Hockey League
- Division: Martin St-Louis
- Founded: 1998, 1999, 2015
- Folded: 2021
- Home arena: Centre Sportif Robert-Lebel
- Colours: Blue, green, and white
- Owner: Minor Hockey Association Chambly
- General manager: Dominic Boucher
- Head coach: Jean-Daniel St-Martin

Franchise history
- 1998–1999: La Prairie Condors
- 1999–2015: Kahnawake Condors
- 2015–2021: Chambly Forts

The Chambly Forts are a Canadian Junior ice hockey team from Chambly, Quebec, Canada. They are part of the Quebec Junior AAA Hockey League. Home games are played at Centre Sportif Robert-Lebel.

On April 29, 2015, a consortium purchased the Kahnawake Condors and transferred the franchise to Chambly for the 2015–2016 season. At the time of relocation the franchise had not yet claimed a regular season division nor league title and had failed to advance beyond the quarterfinal round in playoff competition.

After the first 3 seasons as the Forts their final standings in regular season and playoff rounds had improved to quarter final in 2017–18 season.

After the 2020–21 season, the team was disbanded due to the suspended support of the City of Chambly.

== Season-by-season record ==
Season-by-season results for the team are shown below.

Note: GP = Games Played, W = Wins, L = Losses, T = Ties, OTL = Overtime Losses, GF = Goals for, GA = Goals against

Season	GP	W	L	T	OTL	GF	GA	Pts	Finish	Playoffs
1998-99	52	14	37	-	1	193	293	29	13th QJAAAHL	
1999-00	58	21	35	-	2	203	304	44	10th QJAAAHL	
2000-01	49	2	40	2	5	127	314	11	11th QJAAAHL	
2001-02	53	22	23	0	8	213	276	52	8th QJAAAHL	
2002-03	50	15	30	1	4	169	237	35	10th QJAAAHL	
2003-04	50	16	26	3	5	213	283	40	10th QJAAAHL	
2004-05	48	30	14	0	4	224	180	64	2nd QJAAAHL	
2005-06	51	20	22	0	9	209	222	49	9th QJAAAHL	Lost Preliminary
2006-07	54	32	19	3	0	260	228	67	6th QJAAAHL	Lost quarter-final
2007-08	52	30	19	1	2	211	214	63	6th QJAAAHL	Lost quarter-final
2008-09	49	22	24	-	3	189	216	47	10th QJAAAHL	
2009-10	51	30	20	-	1	234	207	61	7th QJAAAHL	Lost quarter-final
2010-11	49	10	38	-	1	132	262	21	14th QJAAAHL	DNQ
2011-12	49	20	28	-	1	191	222	41	11th QJAAAHL	
2012-13	52	21	25	-	6	235	268	48	10th QJAAAHL	Lost Preliminary
2013-14	52	29	23	-	0	252	250	58	4th QJAAAHL-PB	Lost div. quarter-final
2014-15	52	28	21	-	3	223	216	59	6th QJAAAHL	Lost First Round, 0-3 (Maroons)
Forts de Chambly
2015-16	55	20	32	2	1	237	296	43	5th of 6 St. Louis; 9th of 12 LHJQ	Lost Prelim Round, 0-3 (Braves)
2016-17	49	19	26	4	0	208	270	42	4th of 6 St. Louis; 8t hof 12 LHJQ	Lost Prelim Round, 0-3 (Titans)
2017-18	49	21	26	0	2	194	233	44	4th of 6 St. Louis; 8th of 12 LHJQ	Won Prelim Round, 2-0 (Montagnards); Lost quarters 0-4 (Cobras)
