= Si Miller Arena =

Municipal indoor arena

Coordinates: 45.0143°N 74.7233°W

Si Miller Arena, formerly known as Water Street Arena, was an indoor arena located at 229 Water Street East in Cornwall, Ontario. It was built in 1936 and hosted the Cornwall Royals between 1969 and 1976, during part of their time in the Quebec Major Junior Hockey League, before moving to the Ed Lumley Arena at the Cornwall Civic Complex. The arena was renamed in honour of Si Miller, the City of Cornwall's Director of Parks and Recreation from 1963 until his retirement on December 31, 1994. The arena featured a 185' x 85' ice surface and a seating capacity of 700 people.

There were also many lacrosse and minor league hockey games that took place there, including those of the Cornwall Bulldogs.

After the opening of the Benson Centre in 2011, the Si Miller Arena was demolished.
