= Lachine Maroons =

Les Maroons de Lachine
- City: Lachine, Quebec, Canada
- League: Quebec Junior AAA Hockey League
- Division: Sher-Wood
- Founded: 1995
- Folded: 2015
- Home arena: Arena Pierre Pete Morin
- Colours: Maroon and White
- President: Peter Simpson
- General manager: Jean-Francois Sénéchal
- Head coach: Jean-Francois Sénéchal

Les Maroons de Lachine were a Canadian Junior ice hockey team from Lachine, Quebec, Canada. It started as a franchise in the Metropolitaine leagues in 1953 in both the Junior A and Junior B divisions. Later, in 1995, the Pierrefonds Lions of the Quebec Junior A league moved to Lachine and resumed use of the name.

Following the 2014–15 season the Maroon franchise was sold to investors of the Gatineau Mustangs. The Mustangs were former members of the Eastern Ontario Junior B Hockey League. This league re-organized and re-branded itself as the Central Canada Hockey League Tier 2 and eliminated 6 teams, one of which was the Gatineau Mustangs. The re-located Maroons became known as the Gatineau Flames.

== Season-by-season record ==
Note: GP = Games Played, W = Wins, L = Losses, T = Ties, OTL = Overtime Losses, GF = Goals for, GA = Goals against

Season	GP	W	L	T	OTL	GF	GA	Points	Finish	Playoffs
1995-96	48	22	19	-	7	194	207	51	6th QJAAAHL	
1996-97	48	14	27	-	7	189	234	35	10th QJAAAHL	
1997-98	54	29	23	-	2	229	222	60	7th QJAAAHL	
1998-99	52	21	30	-	1	174	230	43	11th QJAAAHL	
1999-00	58	28	25	-	5	232	247	61	7th QJAAAHL	
2000-01	51	27	20	1	3	247	234	58	5th QJAAAHL	
2001-02	53	31	18	1	3	297	251	66	5th QJAAAHL	
2002-03	50	26	18	2	4	236	207	58	4th QJAAAHL	
2003-04	50	27	17	0	6	254	232	60	6th QJAAAHL	
2004-05	48	21	23	0	4	207	228	46	9th QJAAAHL	
2005-06	51	16	28	0	7	198	265	39	10th QJAAAHL	Lost preliminary
2006-07	54	24	23	7	0	252	273	55	8th QJAAAHL	Lost preliminary
2007-08	52	24	24	2	2	259	263	52	11th QJAAAHL	
2008-09	49	23	23	-	3	222	226	49	9th QJAAAHL	
2009-10	51	16	32	-	3	216	298	35	11th QJAAAHL	DNQ
2010-11	49	14	30	-	5	161	257	33	12th QJAAAHL	Lost preliminary
2011-12	49	25	19	-	5	197	189	55	9th QJAAAHL	
2012-13	52	34	16	-	2	243	193	70	4th QJAAAHL	Lost final
2013-14	52	9	41	-	2	140	294	20	7th QJAAAHL-SL	DNQ
2014-15	52	20	25	-	7	216	255	47	11th QJAAAHL-SL	Won Qualifying Round, 3-0 (Condors); Lost quarter-final, 1-4 (Cougars)
