= Montreal-Est Rangers =

Canadian Junior ice hockey team

Montreal Rangers
- City: Montréal-Est, Quebec, Canada
- League: Quebec Junior Hockey League
- Home arena: Centre récréatif Édouard Rivet
- Owner: John Struthers
- General manager: Eric Rayment; William Bartucci (Asst.)
- Head coach: Patrick Bergeron

Franchise history
- c. 1994-1996: Contrecoeur Blackhawks
- 1996-1997: Charlesbourg Blackhawks
- 1997-2004: Contrecoeur Blackhawks
- 2004-2009: Joliette Action
- 2009-2011: Joliette Traffic
- 2011-Present: Montreal-Est Rangers

The Montreal Rangers are a Junior ice hockey team from Montréal-Est, Quebec, Canada. They are a part of the Quebec Junior Hockey League.

== History ==
=== 2004-05 season ===
In 2004, the Joliette Action were formed after another team's rights were sold to the city.

Prior to the 2004-05 season, the Action were known as Les Éperviers de Contrecoeur. It is not known what year the Éperviers were founded.

Their first year in Joliette went well. The Action finished the season with a winning record.

=== 2006 Royal Bank Cup run ===
The 2005-06 season finished with the Action finishing first in their league with 39 wins, 8 losses, and 4 overtime losses. The Action received a bye in the QJAAAHL's preliminary round and met up with the St. Lawrence Lions in the league quarter-final. The Action swept the Lions 4-games-to-none. In the league semi-final, the Action drew the Le Collège Français de Longueuil and defeated them 4-games-to-2 to move on to the league final. The Action then went on to win the NAPA Cup as QJAAAHL champions by defeating the Lafleche Titans 4-games-to-2 in the league final.

After winning the NAPA cup, the Joliette Action moved on to the Fred Page Cup championship in Pembroke, Ontario. The Fred Page Cup is the Eastern Canadian championship of the Canadian Junior A Hockey League and Hockey Canada. The championship is competed upon by a host city, the QJAAAHL champion and the champions of the Central Junior A Hockey League and the Maritime Junior A Hockey League. The tournament consists of a four team round robin, a semi-final and a one-game "take all" final. Game one of the round robin had the Action up against the tournament host Pembroke Lumber Kings. The Kings were a tournament favourite, and smoked the Action by a score of 8-1. In game two, the Action challenged the CJHL champion Hawkesbury Hawks. After regulation, the score was tied 1-1. The Action came out on top in double overtime taking the game by a score of 7-6. The third game had the Quebec champions up against the MJAHL champion Woodstock Slammers. For the second time, the Action and their opponents went into overtime tied 6-6. The Action won again, clinching a berth into the semi-final by defeating the Slammers in overtime, 7-1. In the semi-final, the Action met Hawkesbury yet again and defeated them 186-4. This set up a grudge match in the final between Pembroke and the l'Action. In the final, the underdog Action defeated the Lumber Kings 0-2 to earn their first trip to the Royal Bank Cup.

The Royal Bank Cup 2006 was hosted by Brampton, Ontario and the Streetsville Derbys of the Ontario Provincial Junior A Hockey League. Along with the Eastern champions Action, were the Central champion Fort William North Stars of the Superior International Junior Hockey League, Western champion Yorkton Terriers of the Saskatchewan Junior Hockey League, and the Pacific champion Burnaby Express of the British Columbia Hockey League. The tournament is a five team round robin, two semi-finals, and a one-game "take all" final. In game one, the Action took on the Yorkton Terriers. The Terriers proved to be the more dominant squad and defeated Joliette 4-1. The second game saw the Action playoff against the Fort William North Stars of Thunder Bay, Ontario. The North Stars rallied late against the Action and caught them on their heels, tying the game 3-3 and sending it into overtime. The Action, took to the defensive in overtime and lost this crucial game 4-3. With this loss, the Action would have to win their next two games if they wished to make the tournament's playoff round. The Action's desperation kicked in, and in game three they defeated the host Streetsville by a score of 4-1 to keep their hopes alive. The fourth and final game was against the Burnaby Express, led by a 16-year-old Kyle Turris. With a win, the Action would clinch a playoff spot, with a loss they would be eliminated. The game did not work out as planned. The Action lost 5-3 and Turris and his Express would go on to win the National Championship only a few days later.

=== 2009 ===
In 2009, the Action became the Joliette Traffic.

=== 2011 ===
In the summer of 2011, the Joliette Traffic moves to Montreal and became the Montreal-East Rangers

=== 2019 ===
The Rangers were acquired by John Struthers, Gianni Cantini, and Eric Rayment. The goal of the new ownership is to build the best Junior A program in Quebec and in Canada by offering top-of-the-line facilities, high end staff members, and other resources needed for the players to reach the next level of their career. Whether it is Major Junior, Canadian or American Universities, or the professionals, the players will have what they need to succeed. The Rangers program is built around the following slogan: "The Road to University Passes Through Junior Hockey". In April 2020, the Rangers hosted their first ever "Rangers Junior Hockey Showcase" that gave the opportunity to elite Midget players to play in front of scout from American and Canadian teams and school.

Following the 2018-2019 season, Brandon Picard went on to play with the Concordia University Wisconsin Falcons in the NCAA III.

=== 2020 ===
Following the 2019-2020 season, Justin Boulet signed a pro contract to play in France with Evry Jets.

In April 2020, the Rangers made changes at the positions of general manager and head coach. Eric Rayment, Vice President, hockey operations added the duties of GM of the Rangers. Patrick Bergeron was promoted from associate coach to head coach.

== Season-by-season record ==
Note: GP = Games Played, W = Wins, L = Losses, T = Ties, OTL = Overtime Losses, GF = Goals for, GA = Goals against

Season	GP	W	L	T	OTL	GF	GA	Points	Finish	Playoffs
1994-95	48	32	14	-	2	262	197	66	2nd QPJHL	
1995-96	48	28	14	-	6	234	215	62	4th QPJHL	Won League
1996-97	48	14	27	-	7	185	262	35	11th QPJHL	
1997-98	54	29	21	-	4	201	188	62	4th QJAAAHL	
1998-99	53	35	10	-	8	276	185	78	2nd QJAAAHL	
1999-00	58	37	16	-	5	247	198	79	5th QJAAAHL	
2000-01	50	27	21	1	1	214	196	56	6th QJAAAHL	
2001-02	53	30	21	1	1	242	223	62	6th QJAAAHL	
2002-03	50	22	20	5	3	176	169	52	8th QJAAAHL	
2003-04	50	19	27	0	4	194	243	42	9th QJAAAHL	
2004-05	48	29	16	1	2	230	190	61	5th QJAAAHL	
2005-06	51	39	8	0	4	271	181	82	1st QJAAAHL	Won League, won FPC
2006-07	54	40	10	3	1	275	182	84	2nd QJAAAHL	Won League
2007-08	52	41	9	1	1	283	162	84	1st QJAAAHL	
2008-09	49	21	25	-	3	208	239	45	11th QJAAAHL	
2009-10	51	24	23	-	4	199	223	52	8th QJAAAHL	Lost quarter-final
2010-11	49	31	13	-	5	240	181	67	5th QJAAAHL	Lost semi-final
2011-12	49	8	40	-	1	143	329	17	14th QJAAAHL	DNQ
2012-13	52	12	36	-	4	225	366	28	14th QJAAAHL	DNQ
2013-14	52	18	28	-	6	219	296	42	4th QJAAAHL-SL	Lost div. semi-final
2014-15	-	-	-	-	-	-	-	-	-	-
2015-16	55	12	39	1	3	160	331	28	5th of 6 Burrows; 11th of 12 QJHL	Lost Div. Prelim. Rd, 1-3 (Arctic)
2016-17	49	16	28	3	2	179	257	37	5th of 6 Burrows; 9th of 12 QJHL	Lost Div. Prelim. Rd, 0-3 (Montagnards)
2017-18	49	24	22	3	0	202	213	51	3rd of 6 Burrows; 6th of 12 QJHL	Won Prelim. Series, 2-0 (Titans); Lost quarterfinals 0-4 (Collège Français)
2018-19	48	22	22	2	2	203	215	48	8th of 13 QJHL	11th place (1-5-0-0) X-over series did not advance
2019-20	48	17	28	1	2	173	236	37	4th of 6 Trevi; 9th of 12 QJHL	Did not qualify for playoffs
2020-21	Season Lost due to covid-19 restrictions									
2021-22	42	25	16	1	0	217	178	51	2nd of 4 West; 6th of 12 QJHL	Lost quarterfinals 1-4 (Condors)
2022-23	42	4	43	1	0	138	316	9	13th of 13 QJHL	Did not qualify for playoffs
2023-24	48	11	34	2	1	171	253	25	12th of 13 QJHL	Did not qualify for playoffs
2024-25	48	25	21	2	-	217	205	52	7th of 13 QJHL	Won Play In 2-0 (Phoenix); Lost Quarterfinals 2-4 (College-Francais)
