= Saint-Hyacinthe Lauréats =

- City: Saint-Hyacinthe, Quebec, Canada
- League: Quebec Junior AAA Hockey League
- Division: David Perron
- Founded: 2012
- Folded: 2015
- Home arena: Aréna L.P. Gaucher
- Colours: Green, Yellow, and White
- General manager: Patrick Arcand
- Head coach: Stéphane Donais

The Saint-Hyacinthe Lauréats are a Junior "A" ice hockey team from Saint-Hyacinthe, Quebec, Canada. They are a part of the Quebec Junior AAA Hockey League.

== History ==
The Saint-Hyacinthe Laureats were added to the Quebec Junior AAA Hockey League for the 2012–13 season.

== Season-by-Season results ==
Season	GP	W	L	T	OTL	GF	GA	P	Results	Playoffs
2012-13	52	19	28	-	5	168	199	43	12th QJAAAHL	Lost Preliminary
2013-14	52	17	32	-	3	195	237	37	7th QJAAAHL-PB	DNQ
