= Saint-Félicien Multiconcessionnaire =

Le Multiconcessionnaire de Saint-Félicien-Dolbeau-Mistassini
- City: Saint-Félicien, Quebec
- League: Quebec AAA Junior Hockey League
- Division: Drolet
- Operated: 2005-2009
- Home arena: Centre Récréatif
- Colours: Blue, Navy Blue, Red, and White
- General manager: Marco Dallaire
- Head coach: Julien Lavoie

Le Multiconcessionnaire de Saint-Félicien-Dolbeau-Mistassini were a Junior "A" ice hockey team from Saint-Félicien, Quebec, Canada. They are a part of the Quebec Junior AAA Hockey League.

== History ==
The Multiconcessionnaire were founded in 2005. They did not make the playoffs in their first season, but were looking to improve in 2006-07.

The Multiconcessionnaire announced in the Summer of 2009 that they will permanently cease operation. It is unclear whether the franchise will be sold or remain dormant.

== Season-by-Season record ==
Note: GP = Games Played, W = Wins, L = Losses, T = Ties, OTL = Overtime Losses, GF = Goals for, GA = Goals against

Season	GP	W	L	T	OTL	GF	GA	Points	Finish	Playoffs
2005-06	51	13	36	0	2	166	251	28	14th QJAAAHL	DNQ
2006-07	54	21	28	4	1	228	257	47	12th QJAAAHL	Lost preliminary
2007-08	52	16	30	4	2	204	270	38	13th QJAAAHL	
2008-09	49	17	27	-	5	165	258	39	13th QJAAAHL	
