= Montreal-North Arctic =

- City: Saint-Leonard, Quebec, Canada
- League: Quebec Junior Hockey League
- Division: Alexandre Burrows
- Founded: 2002
- Home arena: Arena Garon, Montreal-Nord
- Colours: Black, Blue, and White
- Owner(s): Joe Perretta
- Head coach: Gianni Cantini
- Media: Le Progress Saint-Leonard

Franchise history
- 2002-2008: St-Eustache Patriotes
- 2008-2009: Ste-Thérèse Nordiques
- 2009-2010: Laval Rousseau Sports
- 2010-2011: Laval Arctic
- 2011-2017: St-Léonard Arctic
- 2017-2019: Montreal-North Arctic

The Montreal-North Arctic were a Junior "A" ice hockey team from Saint-Leonard, Quebec, Canada and were part of the Quebec Junior Hockey League (QJHL).

== History ==
The franchise entered the QJHL in 2002 as the Gladiateur de St. Eustache

In the Summer of 2008, the team moved to become the Sainte-Thérèse Nordiques.

In the Summer of 2009, the team was moved again to Laval, Quebec. The official name was Rousseau-Sports Junior AAA Laval. In the 2008–09 season Eliezer Sherbatov led the team and was third in the league in scoring. In the playoffs, he helped the team win the championship while leading the playoffs with 15 goals in 18 games.

In 2010, the name was changed again to the Laval Arctic. One season later they became the St-Leonard Arctic. After the start of the 2017 season the club re-branded once more, this time becoming the Montreal-North Arctic.

The North Arctic folded after the 2018-19 season.

== Season-by-season record ==
Note: GP = Games Played, W = Wins, L = Losses, T = Ties, OTL = Overtime Losses, GF = Goals for, GA = Goals against

Season	GP	W	L	T	OTL	GF	GA	Points	Finish	Playoffs
2002-03	50	11	34	2	3	184	278	27	11th QJAAAHL	
2003-04	50	39	9	0	2	241	158	80	1st QJAAAHL	Lost in Finals
2004-05	48	20	27	0	1	181	239	41	11th QJAAAHL	
2005-06	51	15	32	0	4	183	277	34	13th QJAAAHL	Lost Preliminary
2006-07	53	23	22	4	4	244	260	54	10th QJAAAHL	Lost quarter-final
2007-08	52	27	20	4	1	264	228	59	7th QJAAAHL	Lost semi-finals
2008-09	49	29	18	-	2	211	215	60	7th QJAAAHL	Lost semi-finals
2009-10	51	18	25	-	8	197	220	44	10th QJAAAHL	DNQ
2010-11	49	21	25	-	3	191	237	41	11th QJAAAHL	Lost Preliminary
2011-12	49	24	21	-	4	210	263	52	10th QJAAAHL	
2012-13	52	10	34	-	8	212	315	28	15th QJAAAHL	DNQ
2013-14	52	16	32	-	4	189	269	36	6th QJAAAHL-SL	Lost div. quarter-final
2014-15	-	-	-	-	-	-	-	-	-	-
2015-16	55	30	19	3	3	220	217	66	4th of 6 Burrows; 7th of 12 QJHL	Won Prelim Round, 3-1 (Rangers); Lost Quarterfinals, 0-4 (Montagnards)
2016-17	49	30	14	2	3	240	178	65	2nd of 6 Burrows; 4th of 12 QJHL	Won Div Semifinals, 4-2 (Panthers); Lost League Semifinal 1-4 (Collège Français)
2017-18	49	8	40	1	0	127	310	17	6th of 6 Burrows; 12th of 12 QJHL	Did not qualify for playoffs

== Notable players ==
- Eliezer Sherbatov (born 1991), Canadian-Israeli ice hockey player
