= Longueuil Collège Français =

Collège Français de Longueuil
- City: Longueuil
- League: LHAAAQ
- Founded: 1998
- Home arena: Colisée Jean Béliveau
- Colours: Dark blue Crimson
- Owner: Collège Français
- General manager: Pierre Pétroni
- Head coach: Jonathan Castonguay
- Website: cflongueuilaaa.com

Franchise history
- 1988–1996: Longueuil Sieurs
- Since 1996: Collège Français de Longueuil

The Collège Français de Longueuil are a junior ice hockey club from the Collège Français secondary school in Longueuil, Quebec, and a member of the Quebec Junior Hockey League (LHJAAAQ). The team plays its home games at the Colisée Jean Béliveau in Longueuil.

== Arena ==
The club plays its home games at the 2,400-seat Colisée Jean Béliveau in Longueuil. The building opened in 1966.

== History ==
The franchise was founded in 1988 and was initially branded as the Longueuil Sieurs, or Sieurs de Longueuil, until 1996. Longueuil won the league championship NAPA Cup in the 1989–90, 1996–97, 2010–11, 2012–13, 2014–15, 2015-16, 2017-18, 2021–22 and 2023–24 seasons. The 1990 Sieurs went on to win the Central Canada regional championship Dudley Hewitt Cup before finishing in fourth place at the national championship Centennial Cup in Vernon, British Columbia. Sieurs forward, Marc Alain Duchaine, was named most valuable player of the tournament.

The 2019–20 team finished the regular season in first place overall. The playoffs were cancelled due to public health restrictions linked to the emergence of the COVID-19 pandemic.

The 2021–22 team scored on average 6.46 goals per game during the regular season, while their opponents scored 2.56 goals per game. Forward Maxime Gagné won the league scoring title with 94 points. The team finished the regular season in first place overall and went on to win the league championship. The team went on to compete for the national championship 2022 Centennial Cup tournament in Estevan, Saskatchewan.

The 2023–24 team, despite finishing the regular season in fourth place overall, won the league championship and advanced to the national championship 2024 Centennial Cup tournament in Oakville, Ontario.

Statistics
Season	GP	W	L	T	OTL	GF	GA	Pts	Regular season	Postseason
1988–89	40	32	5	3	0	342	164	67	1st overall	Won final
1989–90	42	37	5	0	0	339	139	74	1st overall	Won final
1990–91	44	19	20	5	0	238	221	43	6th overall	
1991–92	48	34	12	2	0	272	168	70	2nd overall	
1992–93	50	37	9	4	0	258	165	78	1st overall	
1993–94	48	28	20	0	0	287	197	56	6th overall	
1994–95	48	30	17	0	1	288	242	61	4th overall	
1995–96	48	34	13	0	1	255	197	69	3rd overall	
1996–97	48	35	9	0	4	248	168	74	2nd overall	Won final
1997–98	55	27	21	0	7	271	251	61	6th overall	
1998–99	52	23	23	0	6	256	265	52	8th overall	
1999–00	59	30	24	0	5	261	269	65	6th overall	
2000–01	49	29	16	3	1	196	185	62	3rd overall	
2001–02	53	36	14	1	2	301	185	75	3rd overall	
2002–03	50	26	18	3	3	203	193	58	3rd overall	
2003–04	50	33	12	3	2	278	185	71	2nd overall	
2004–05	48	26	17	2	3	200	165	57	6th overall	
2005–06	51	35	13	0	3	258	170	73	5th overall	Lost semifinal
2006–07	54	39	11	2	2	292	204	82	3rd overall	Lost final
2007–08	52	31	16	1	4	270	240	67	4th overall	
2008–09	49	31	14	0	4	233	197	66	5th overall	
2009–10	51	34	11	0	6	265	197	74	3rd overall	Lost final
2010–11	49	35	11	0	3	269	171	73	2nd overall	Won final
2011–12	49	33	14	0	2	293	191	68	3rd overall	
2012–13	52	39	9	0	4	253	139	82	2nd overall	Won final
2013–14	52	24	26	0	2	230	218	50	5th overall	Lost quarterfinal
2014–15	52	35	11	0	2	257	169	76	2nd in division 2nd overall	Won final against Sherbrooke (4:3)
2015–16	55	43	8	1	2	320	148	89	1st in division 2nd overall	Won quarterfinal against Valleyfield (4:0); Won semifinal against Terrebonne (4:1); Won final against Granby (4:0)
2016–17	49	43	4	0	2	307	147	88	1st in division 2nd overall	Won quarterfinal against Princeville (4:0); Won league semifinal against St-Léonard (4:1); Lost league finals against Terrebonne (4:1)
2017–18	49	38	8	3	0	246	134	79	1st in division 2nd overall	Won quarterfinal against Montreal-Est (4:0); Won semifinal against Granby (4:0); Won final against Terrebonne (4:1)
2018–19	48	36	9	1	2	245	159	75	2nd overall	3rd place (5:1) X-over series Won quarterfinal against Valleyfield (4:0); Lost semifinal against Princeville (4:1)
2019–20	48	37	9	1	1	225	111	76	1st in division 1st overall	Cancelled
2020–21	Season cancelled									
2021–22	41	34	4	3	0	266	105	71	1st in division 1st overall	Won quarterfinal against Granby (4:1); Won semifinal against Terrebonne (4:1); Won final against Beauce-Appalaches (4:1)
2022–23	48	36	6	3	3	248	123	78	2nd overall	Won quarterfinal against Valleyfield (4:0); Lost semifinal against Beauce-Appalaches (4:3)
2023–24	48	30	14	2	2	232	145	64	4th overall	Won quarterfinal against Laval (4:0); Won semifinal against Terrebonne (4:3); Won final against Côte-du-Sud (4:3)
2024–25	48	36	11	1	0	247	143	73	2nd overall	Won quarterfinal against Montreal (4:2); Won semifinal against Beauce-Appalaches (4:2); Lost final against Valleyfield (4:2)
2025–26	48	41	6	0	0	239	103	83	1st overall	Won quarterfinal against Valleyfield (4:1); Won semifinal against Cote-du-Sud (4:0); Won final against Cegep Beauce-Appalaches (4:0)

"Longueuil Sieurs [LHAAAQ] statistics and history". hockeydb.com.
"Longueuil Collège Français [LHAAAQ] statistics and history". hockeydb.com.

== Regional championships ==
Year	Round Robin	Record	Standing	Semifinal	Gold Medal Game
2015	W, Cornwall Colts 5-2; L, Carleton Place Canadians 2-4; L, Dieppe Commandos 3-6	1-2-0	3rd of 4	2OTL Dieppe Commandos 2-3	n/a
2016	W, Pictou County Crushers 4-1; W, Woodstock Slammers 9-5; L, Carleton Place Canadians 3-6	2-1-0	2nd of 4	OTL, Woodstock Slammers 2-3	n/a
2017 *	SOW, Carleton Place Canadians 2-1; W, Truro Bearcats 6-4; 2OTL, Terrebonne Cobras 2-3	2-0-1	2nd of 4	L, Carleton Place Canadians 0-2	n/a
2018	W, Carleton Place Canadians 2-1; W, Edmundston Blizzard 6-3; 2OTL, Ottawa Jr. Senators 2-3	2-0-1-0	2nd of 4	W, Edmundston Blizzard 5-1	L, Ottawa Jr. Senators 1-10

- - Terrebonne league champs but also Fred Page hosts. Therefore Longuiel is LQHL rep.

== Centennial Cup ==
The Sieurs first competed for the national championship at the 1990 Centennial Cup in Vernon, British Columbia. Despite their fourth-place finish, Sieurs forward, Marc Alain Duchaine, was named most valuable player of the tournament.

Year	Round-robin	Record	Standing	Quarterfinal	Semifinal	Championship
2022	L, Brooks Bandits (AJHL), 2-5; W, Estevan Bruins (SJHL-Host), 5-3; OTL, Pickering Panthers (OJHL), ?-? W, Red Lake Miners (MJHL), 6-1	2-0-1-1	3rd of 5 Pool A	Won - 4-3; Summerside Western Capitals	Lost - 2-11; Brooks Bandits	Did not qualify
2024	L, Navan Grads (CCHL), 1-5; L, Calgary Canucks (AJHL), 1-5; L, Collingwood Blues (OJHL), 0-8; L, Greater Sudbury Cubs (NOHL), 0-6	0-0-4-0	5th of 5 Group A	Did not qualify	Did not qualify	Did not qualify

== Sources ==
- Berthelot, William (18 May 2022). "Collège Français de Longueuil: À la conquête de la Coupe du Centenaire". Source du Hockey (in French).
- "Collège Français: 65 ans de tradition et d'innovation". La Presse (in French). 29 August 2023.
- Matte, Sébastien (27 April 2024). "Le Collège Français de Longueuil remporte la Coupe NAPA". Source du Hockey (in French).
- Matte, Sébastien (2 June 2025). "Le Collège Français de Longueuil a trouvé son nouvel entraîneur-chef". Source du Hockey (in French).
- Matte, Sébastien (16 June 2025). "On connaît le lieu du repêchage 2026 de la LHJAAAQ". Source du Hockey (in French).
- Gervais, Justin (8 November 2025). "Le Collège Français encaisse sa première défaite de la saison". FM 103,3 (in French).
