= Terrebonne Cobras =

Terrebonne Cobras Les Cobras de Terrebonne
- City: Terrebonne, Quebec, Canada
- League: Quebec Junior Hockey League
- Division: Alexandre Burrows
- Founded: c. 1988
- Home arena: Complexe sportif de Terrebonne
- Colours: Black, Yellow, and Blue
- General manager: Robert Dubuc
- Head coach: Robert Dubuc

Franchise history
- c. 1988-1991: Laval-Bourassa Cobras
- 1991-1992: Montreal-Nord Cobras
- 1992-2003: La Plaine Cobras
- 2003-Present: Terrebonne Cobras

The Terrebonne Cobras are a junior ice hockey team from Terrebonne, Quebec, Canada, part of the Quebec Junior Hockey League.

Since relocating to Terrebonne, the Cobras are two time Quebec Junior League Champions winning in 2010 and again last year in 2017. Both championships advance the organization to the Fred Page Cup to determine an eastern Canada champion to compete in the National Championships. The Cobras efforts in 2010 were stopped in the Fred Page Cup by eventual National Champions Pembroke Lumber Kings. The second opportunity the Cobras won their first Fred Page Cup and made it to the semifinals at the National finals.

== Season-by-season record ==
Note: GP = Games Played, W = Wins, L = Losses, T = Ties, OTL = Overtime Losses, GF = Goals for, GA = Goals against

Season	GP	W	L	T	OTL	GF	GA	Points	Finish	Playoffs
1988-89	39	3	32	4	-	130	316	10	11th QPJHL	
1989-90	42	9	28	5	-	168	292	23	9th QPJHL	
1990-91	44	11	32	1	-	183	263	23	10th QPJHL	
1991-92	48	29	15	4	-	324	258	62	5th QPJHL	
1992-93	50	13	36	1	-	239	380	27	13th QPJHL	
1993-94	48	19	27	-	2	235	287	40	9th QPJHL	
1994-95	48	21	23	-	4	249	268	46	9th QPJHL	
1995-96	48	25	19	-	4	224	228	54	5th QPJHL	
1996-97	48	17	29	-	2	220	279	36	9th QPJHL	
1997-98	54	27	25	-	2	224	245	56	9th QJAAAHL	
1998-99	52	21	24	-	7	240	289	49	9th QJAAAHL	
1999-00	58	40	16	-	2	285	231	82	3rd QJAAAHL	
2000-01	49	22	25	2	0	227	249	46	9th QJAAAHL	
2001-02	53	27	22	1	3	238	226	58	7th QJAAAHL	
2002-03	50	23	21	3	3	239	231	52	7th QJAAAHL	
2003-04	50	27	17	3	3	188	165	60	5th QJAAAHL	
2004-05	48	22	21	2	3	187	194	49	7th QJAAAHL	
2005-06	51	16	30	0	5	185	237	37	12th QJAAAHL	Lost Preliminary
2006-07	54	32	14	5	3	258	232	72	5th QJAAAHL	Lost quarter-final
2007-08	52	31	18	0	3	248	215	65	5th QJAAAHL	Lost Preliminary
2008-09	49	33	16	-	0	226	171	66	4th QJAAAHL	Lost semi-final
2009-10	51	39	8	-	4	278	173	82	1st QJAAAHL	Won League
2010-11	49	32	13	-	4	210	149	70	4th QJAAAHL	Lost quarter-final
2011-12	49	28	16	-	5	203	165	61	4th QJAAAHL	
2012-13	52	25	21	-	6	202	227	56	9th QJAAAHL	Lost Preliminary
2013-14	52	31	15	-	6	260	221	68	5th QJAAAHL	Lost semi finals
2014-15	-	-	-	-	-	-	-	-	-	-
2015-16	55	38	13	0	4	292	192	80	2nd of 6 Burrows; 3rd of 12 QJHL	Won quarterfinals, 4-0 (Panthers); Lost semifinals, 1-4 (Collège Français)
2016-17	49	44	4	0	0	313	132	88	1st of 6 Burrows; 1st of 12 QJHL	Won quarterfinals, 4-1 (Montagnards); Won semifinals 4-2 (Inouk); Won League Finals 4-1 (Collège Français); LHJQ Champions
2017-18	49	43	5	1	0	347	141	87	1st of 6 Burrows; 1st of 12 QJHL	Won quarterfinals, 4-0 (Forts); Won semifinals 4-1 (Panthers); Lost League Finals 1-4 (Collège Français)
2018-19	48	37	7	3	1	225	134	78	1st of 13 QJHL	6th (4-0-2-0) x-over round Lost quarterfinals, 4-0 (Predateurs); Won semifinals 4-3 (Inouk); Lost League Finals 3-4 (Titans)
2019-20	48	32	13	1	2	247	163	67	3rd of 6 Trevi; 5th of 12 QJHL	Playoffs cancelled due to covid-19
2020–21	Season cancelled due to covid-19									
2021–22	42	25	12	4	1	210	164	55	3rd of 4 North; 5th of 12 QJHL	Won quarterfinals 4-2 (Predateurs); Lost semifinals, 1–4 (Condors)
2022–23	48	42	5	0	1	228	110	85	1st of 13 QJHL	Won quarterfinals 4-0 (Predateurs); Won semifinals, 4-1(Titans); Won Finals 4-3 (Condors); Advance to Centennial Cup
2023–24	48	34	12	0	2	236	157	70	1st of 13 QJHL	Won quarterfinals 4-1 (Braves); Lost semifinals, 3-4(Collège Français)
2024–25	48	25	18	5	0	190	164	55	6th of 13 QJHL	Lost quarterfinals 3-4 (Condors)

== Fred Page Cup ==
Eastern Canada Championships
MHL - QAAAJHL - CCHL - Host
Round robin play with 2nd vs 3rd in semi-final to advance against 1st in the finals.

Year	Round Robin	Record	Standing	Semifinal	Gold Medal Game
2010	OTL, Pembroke Lumber Kings 5-6; W, Woodstock Slammers 6-2; L, Brockville Braves 2-5	1-1-1	3rd of 4	L, Pembroke Lumber Kings 4-6	n/a
2017 *	W, Truro Bearcats 8-2; OTW, Carleton Place Canadians 8-7; 2OTW, Longueuil Collège Français 3-2	3-0-0	1st of 4	qualified to finals	W, Carleton Place Canadians 5-2; Fred Page Cup Champions advance to Royal Bank Cup

== Royal Bank Cup ==
CANADIAN NATIONAL CHAMPIONSHIPS
Dudley Hewitt Champions - Central, Fred Page Champions - Eastern, Western Canada Cup Champions - Western, [[Western Canada Cup|Trenton Golden HawksWestern Canada Cup - Runners Up]] and Host
Round robin play with top 4 in semi-final and winners to finals.

Year	Round Robin	Record W-OTW-OTL-L	Standing	Semifinal	Gold Medal Game
2017	L, Brooks Bandits 3-6; W, Trenton Golden Hawks 3-2; L, Cobourg Cougars 1-6; W, Penticton Vees 3-2	1-0-0-2	3rd of 5	L, Brooks Bandits 0-4	did not advance
