= Valleyfield Braves (defunct) =

Former Canadian junior ice hockey team

Les Braves de Valleyfield
- City: Salaberry-de-Valleyfield, Quebec, Canada
- League: Quebec Junior AAA Hockey League
- Division: Martin St-Louis
- Operated: c. 1988-2013
- Home arena: Aréna Salaberry
- Colours: Black, Yellow, Red, and White
- General manager: Stéphane Scotto
- Head coach: David Rochon
- Media: CKOD-FM, Le Soleil de Valleyfield, Le Journal St-François, INFOSuroit.com

Franchise history
- 1988-1994: Chateauguay Elites
- 1994-1998: Valleyfield Elites
- 1998-2013: Valleyfield Braves

Les Braves de Valleyfield are a Junior ice hockey team from Salaberry-de-Valleyfield, Quebec, Canada. They were a part of the Quebec Junior AAA Hockey League for 25 seasons. Another franchise relocated and took over their market and former moniker in 2014.

== History ==
The Valleyfield Braves is the second team to bear this name. The first Braves team was formed in 1944 as a Senior Amateur hockey team in the Quebec Provincial Hockey League, then moved to the Quebec Senior Hockey League in 1945 and finally as a Minor League team with the Quebec Hockey League from 1953 to 1955.

The current Valleyfield team won their first league championship in 1999. The Braves advanced to the Fred Page Cup in Charlottetown, Prince Edward Island. The tournament was won by the Charlottetown Abbies. In 2002, the Braves returned to the Fred Page Cup in Truro, Nova Scotia. The Valleyfield Braves playing a semi-final games against the CJHL's Ottawa Jr. Senators in a must-win game between both teams. The Halifax Oland Exports got a bye to the final and were hosting the Royal Bank Cup and the Central representative was to be decided between Valleyfield and Ottawa. Ottawa won 7-2 and advanced to the Royal Bank Cup, while Valleyfield returned home. The town of Salaberry-de-Valleyfield and the Valleyfield Braves were chosen to host the Fred Page Cup in 2004. The Valleyfield Braves out-powered 5th ranked St-Eustance Gladiateurs 4 games 1 in the finals. The tournament was eventually won by the CJHL's Nepean Raiders.

In 1999-00, the Valleyfield Braves played the CJHL's Brockville Braves in an inter-locking home and home series.

The Braves dissolved their QJAAAHL franchise in the Summer of 2013 to seek a membership with the semi-professional Ligue Nord-Américaine de Hockey. The LNAH team was also known as the Valleyfield Braves. Eleven games into the 2013-14 LNAH season, the franchise relocated to Laval and became the Laval Braves.

== Season-by-season record ==
Note: GP = Games Played, W = Wins, L = Losses, T = Ties, OTL = Overtime Losses, GF = Goals for, GA = Goals against

Season	GP	W	L	T	OTL	GF	GA	Points	Finish	Playoffs
1988-89	40	12	21	7	-	197	249	31	8th QPJHL	
1989-90	42	21	15	6	-	197	209	48	4th QPJHL	
1990-91	44	33	10	1	-	278	169	67	1st QPJHL	
1991-92	48	23	21	4	-	235	220	50	8th QPJHL	
1992-93	50	30	17	3	-	269	216	63	6th QPJHL	Won League, won DHC
1993-94	48	37	11	-	0	321	200	74	1st QPJHL	Won League, won DHC
1994-95	48	29	15	-	4	258	198	62	3rd QPJHL	
1995-96	48	19	26	-	3	210	257	41	9th QPJHL	
1996-97	48	30	16	-	2	226	191	62	4th QPJHL	
1997-98	54	28	22	-	4	256	231	60	8th QJAAAHL	
1998-99	52	33	18	-	1	300	241	67	5th QJAAAHL	Won League
1999-00	58	25	30	-	3	263	277	53	10th QJAAAHL	
2000-01	49	34	12	2	2	301	205	72	1st QJAAAHL	
2001-02	53	36	14	1	2	299	211	75	2nd QJAAAHL	Won League
2002-03	50	29	14	3	4	264	213	65	2nd QJAAAHL	
2003-04	50	30	13	1	6	246	189	67	3rd QJAAAHL	Won League
2004-05	48	29	15	2	2	226	172	62	4th QJAAAHL	
2005-06	51	25	21	0	5	226	216	55	7th QJAAAHL	Lost quarter-final
2006-07	54	36	14	4	0	257	206	76	4th QJAAAHL	Lost semi-final
2007-08	52	26	23	0	3	228	210	55	9th QJAAAHL	
2008-09	49	21	20	-	8	220	214	50	8th QJAAAHL	
2009-10	51	16	33	-	2	183	284	34	12th QJAAAHL	DNQ
2010-11	49	31	16	-	2	222	171	64	6th QJAAAHL	Lost final
2011-12	49	28	16	-	5	245	225	61	5th QJAAAHL	
2012-13	52	20	28	-	4	193	255	44	11th QJAAAHL	Lost preliminary
