= St-Jérôme Panthers =

Les Panthères de St-Jérome
- City: Saint-Jérôme, Quebec, Canada
- League: Quebec Junior Hockey League
- Division: Alexandre Burrows
- Founded: 1988
- Home arena: Aréna Melançon
- Colours: Turquoise, black, and white
- General manager: Pierre Bergeron (2017–18)
- Head coach: Pierre Bergeron (2017–18)

Franchise history
- 1988–1991: St. Antoine Rapidos
- 1991–1992: Laval-Laurentides Panthers
- 1992–present: St. Jerome Panthers

Les Panthères de St-Jérome or the St Jérome Panthers are a junior ice hockey team from Saint-Jérôme, Quebec, Canada. They are a part of the Quebec Junior Hockey League.

== History ==
The franchise was founded in 1988 as the Saint-Antoine Rapidos. A season later they were known as the Laval-Laurentides Panthers. In 1992, the team moved to Saint-Jerome.

The Panthers won the Fred Page Cup in 2001, earning the right to compete at the 2001 Royal Bank Cup, the Canadian Junior "A" National Championship.

The Panthers have been, in recent years, continually in the upper echelon of the QJAAAHL and were awarded hosting duties for the 2007 Fred Page Cup.

== Season-by-season record ==
Note: GP = Games Played, W = Wins, L = Losses, T = Ties, OTL = Overtime Losses, GF = Goals for, GA = Goals against

Season	GP	W	L	T	OTL	GF	GA	Points	Finish	Playoffs
1988–89	40	25	9	6	—	217	152	56	3rd QPJHL	
1989–90	42	28	13	1	—	255	169	57	3rd QPJHL	
1990–91	44	16	25	3	—	227	244	35	7th QPJHL	
1991–92	48	22	25	1	—	247	278	45	9th QPJHL	
1992–93	50	35	10	5	—	281	204	75	2nd QPJHL	
1993–94	48	25	23	—	0	283	269	50	8th QPJHL	
1994–95	48	27	16	—	5	292	254	59	6th QPJHL	
1995–96	48	34	12	—	2	279	222	70	2nd QPJHL	
1996–97	48	37	10	—	1	277	180	75	1st QPJHL	
1997–98	54	29	22	—	3	249	232	61	5th QJAAAHL	
1998–99	52	31	18	—	3	278	219	65	7th QJAAAHL	
1999–00	58	41	13	—	4	373	271	86	2nd QJAAAHL	
2000–01	49	30	15	0	4	312	247	64	2nd QJAAAHL	Won League
2001–02	53	37	12	1	3	343	236	78	1st QJAAAHL	
2002–03	50	24	22	1	3	215	218	52	6th QJAAAHL	
2003–04	50	29	15	3	3	235	219	64	4th QJAAAHL	
2004–05	48	34	12	1	1	205	164	70	1st QJAAAHL	
2005–06	51	34	11	0	6	258	208	74	4th QJAAAHL	Lost quarter-final
2006–07	54	42	10	2	0	313	188	86	1st QJAAAHL	Lost semi-final
2007–08	52	26	19	4	3	258	232	59	8th QJAAAHL	
2008–09	49	33	13	—	3	263	160	69	2nd QJAAAHL	
2009–10	51	35	11	—	5	250	161	75	2nd QJAAAHL	Lost quarter-final
2010–11	49	34	10	—	5	239	136	73	3rd QJAAAHL	Lost quarter-final
2011–12	49	29	18	—	2	228	176	60	6th QJAAAHL	Lost final
2012–13	52	40	8	—	4	315	194	84	1st QJAAAHL	Lost quarter-final
2013–14	52	42	7	—	3	315	324	87	1st QJAAAHL	Lost semi-final
2014–15	52	32	17	3	—	231	187	67	1st of 5 Martin St-Louis; 4th of 14 QJHL	Lost quarterfinals, 1–4 (Mustangs)
2015–16	55	34	16	4	1	254	211	73	3rd of 6 Burrows; 4th of 12 QJHL	Lost quarterfinals, 0–4 (Cobras)
2016–17	49	21	25	1	2	211	261	45	3rd of 6 Burrows; 6th of 12 QJHL	Lost div. semi-finals, 2–4 (Arctic)
2017–18	49	34	13	2	0	236	160	70	2nd of 6 Burrows; 4th of 12 QJHL	Won quarterfinals, 4–2 (Flames); Lost semifinals, 1–4 (Cobras)
2018–19	48	24	17	4	3	208	154	55	6th of 13 QJHL	2nd (5-0-0-1) x-over round Lost quarterfinals, 2-4 (Titans)
2019–20	48	33	13	1	1	233	144	68	6th of 13 QJHL	Playoffs cancelled due to covid-19
2020–21	Season cancelled due to covid-19									
2021–22	42	31	9	1	1	233	144	64	1st of 4 North; 2nd of 12 QJHL	Won quarterfinals, 3–2 (Braves); Lost semifinals, 0–4 (Condors)
2022–23	48	24	19	2	3	194	191	53	5th of 13 QJHL	Lost quarterfinals, 0-4 (Condors)
2023–24	48	26	19	3	0	233	215	55	7th of 13 QJHL	Won Play in Rd 2-0 (Titans); Lost quarterfinals, 1-4 (Collège Français)
2024–25	48	23	21	3	1	208	212	50	8th of 13 QJHL	Won Play in Rd 2-0 (VC); Lost quarterfinals, 0-4 (Braves)
