= Princeville Titan =

- City: Princeville, Quebec, Canada
- League: Quebec Junior Hockey League
- Division: East
- Founded: 1996
- Home arena: Center Paul-de-la-Sablonnière
- Colours: Teal and Purple
- General manager: Jean Provencher
- Head coach: Guillaume St-Denis

Franchise history
- 1996-2002: Warwick Titan
- 2002-2008: College Lafleche Titan
- 2008-Present: Princeville Titan

The Princeville Titan are a Canadian Junior ice hockey team from Princeville, Quebec, Canada. They are a part of the Quebec Junior Hockey League.

== History ==
The team originated as the Warwick Titan in 1996. They became the College Lafleche Titan in 2002.

The 2005-06 season was their first campaign to finish with a winning record. They were good enough to lose the league final in six games to the eventual Fred Page Cup Eastern Canadian Champion Joliette Action.

In Summer 2008, the Titan were relocated to Princeville, Quebec.

The Titan won their first Quebec Junior League Championship during the 2011-12 season and the league representative at the Eastern Canadian Jr. A Fred Page Cup Championships. The team went 0-3 in the round robin play.

== Season-by-season record ==
Note: GP = Games Played, W = Wins, L = Losses, T = Ties, OTL = Overtime Losses, GF = Goals for, GA = Goals against

Season	GP	W	L	T	OTL	GF	GA	Points	Finish	Playoffs
1996-97	48	21	22	-	5	204	199	47	8th QJAAAHL	
1997-98	54	26	26	-	2	190	207	54	10th QJAAAHL	
1998-99	52	32	15	-	5	249	189	69	4th QJAAAHL	
1999-00	58	38	17	-	3	291	206	79	4th QJAAAHL	
2000-01	49	22	22	4	1	211	215	49	8th QJAAAHL	
2001-02	53	16	33	-	4	165	230	36	10th QJAAAHL	
2002-03	50	19	25	2	4	203	228	44	9th QJAAAHL	
2003-04	50	16	27	1	6	175	243	39	11th QJAAAHL	
2004-05	48	17	28	1	2	173	238	37	12th QJAAAHL	
2005-06	51	36	12	0	3	216	157	75	3rd QJAAAHL	Lost final
2006-07	53	6	46	1	0	135	343	13	14th QJAAAHL	DNQ
2007-08	52	7	42	2	1	156	364	17	14th QJAAAHL	
2008-09	49	29	15	-	5	204	183	63	6th QJAAAHL	
2009-10	51	34	15	-	2	243	160	72	4th QJAAAHL	Lost semi-final
2010-11	49	22	22	-	5	197	194	49	8th QJAAAHL	Lost quarter-final
2011-12	49	28	20	-	1	234	192	57	7th QJAAAHL	Won League
2012-13	52	28	20	-	4	189	180	60	7th QJAAAHL	Lost quarter-final
2013-14	52	34	11	-	7	276	173	75	4th QJAAAHL	Lost quarter-final
2014-15	-	-	-	-	-	-	-	-	-	-
2015-16	55	14	37	1	3	192	301	32	6th of 6 St. Louis; 10th of 12 QJHL	did not qualify
2016-17	49	14	29	3	3	194	274	34	5th of 6 St. Louis; 11th of 12 QJHL	Won Prelim Rd, 3-0 (Forts); Lost div semi-final, 0-4 (Collège Français)
2017-18	49	14	31	3	1	194	274	32	5th of 6 St. Louis; 11th of 12 QJHL	lost Prelim Rd, 0-2 (Est Rangers)
2018-19	48	35	9	2	2	267	181	74	3rd of 13 QJHL	4th place (4-1-0-1) X-over series Won Quarterfinals 4-2 (Panthers); Won Semifinals 4-1 (Collège Français); Won League Finals 4-3 (Terrebonne Cobras); Advance to Fred Page Cup
2019-20	48	32	8	2	6	283	213	72	3rd of 13 QJHL	Did Not Qualify for Post Season
2020-21	Season Lost due to covid-19 restrictions									
2021-22	41	14	24	3	0	159	222	31	4th of 4 East; 9h of 12 LHJQ	Did Not Qualify for Post Season
2022-23	48	29	15	0	4	236	194	62	4th of 13 QJHL	Won Quarterfinals 4-2 (Inouk); Lost Semifinals 1-4 (Cobras)
2023-24	48	17	28	1	2	200	256	37	10th of 13 QJHL	Lost Play in Rd 0-2 (Panthers)
2024-25	48	4	42	1	1	110	349	10	13th of 13 QJHL	Did Not Qualify for Post Season

== Fred Page Cup ==
Eastern Canada Championships
MHL - QAAAJHL - CCHL - Host
Round robin play with 2nd vs 3rd in semi-final to advance against 1st in the finals.

Year	Round Robin	Record	Standing	Semifinal	Gold Medal Game
2012	L, Nepean Raiders 0-4; L, Woodstock Slammers 3-5; L, Kanata Stallions 4-7	0-3-0	4th of 4	n/a	n/a
2019	W, Yarmouth Mariners 3-2; OTW, Ottawa Jr. Senators 4-3; W, Amherst Ramblers 3-0	2-1-0-0	1st of 4	bye	Lost - 2-9; Ottawa Jr. Senators
