= Sherbrooke Cougars =

Sherbrooke Cougars of Collège Champlain
- City: Sherbrooke, Quebec, Canada
- League: RSEQ Quebec Cégep Hockey League
- Division: Guilbault
- Founded: 1970s
- Folded: 2015
- Home arena: John H. Price Sports Complex
- Colours: Navy blue and silver
- General manager: Martin Lapré
- Head coach: Stéphan Lebeau

Franchise history
- 1970s–2002: Champlain Cougars (collegiate)
- 2002–2003: Lennoxville Cougars
- 2003–2015: Sherbrooke Cougars

The Sherbrooke Cougars of Collège Champlain are a junior ice hockey team from Sherbrooke, Quebec, Canada. They were part of the Quebec Junior AAA Hockey League from 2002 to 2015.

== History ==
The Champlain Cougars were founded in the 1970s, and played in collegiate leagues until 2002, when they joined the QJAAAHL in 2002.

The team played its first season as the Lennoxville Cougars, using the W.B. Scott Arena on the Bishop's University campus as their home arena, before moving to Sherbrooke in 2003 to fill in for the departed Sherbrooke Castors who relocated to Lewiston, Maine. In 2012, the Cougars moved out of the Palais des Sports to make way for the Sherbrooke Phoenix. The team now plays in the Thibault GM Complex.

In 2002–03, the Cougars won the Napa Cup as LHJAAAQ champions. They defeated the Longueuil Collège Français in the finals. Lennoxville won the Fred Page Cup by defeating the CJHL's Nepean Raiders in the final and traveled to Charlottetown for the Royal Bank Cup, where they bowed out of the semi-finals to the Camrose Kodiaks of the AJHL.

In 2008 and 2009, the Cougars returned to the Fred Page Cup, but did not make the finals. In 2014, the Cougars played a close series with the Granby Inouk, who lost the series in 7 games. Sherbrooke came close again, against the Longueuil Collège Français in the 2015 Napa Cup finals losing in 7 games, despite leading the series 2-0 and 3–2.

In 2015 the hockey team made a request to return to the re-established collegiate league for the 2016–2017 season. Following acceptance, the Sherbrooke Cougars were expelled by the QJAAAHL, so they would not be able to participate in the draft or play in the 2015–2016 season. The Sherbrooke Cougars were one of the most-dominant teams in the QJAAAHL. The Director of Athletics at Champlain College Lennoxville then made a special request to rejoin the collegiate league for the 2015–2016 season (not the required two-year wait), and it was accepted.

The Champlain Cougars will play all home games at the new arena in the recently renovated John H. Price Sports Complex on campus.

== Season-by-season record ==
Note: GP = Games Played, W = Wins, L = Losses, T = Ties, OTL = Overtime Losses, GF = Goals for, GA = Goals against

Season	GP	W	L	T	OTL	GF	GA	Points	Finish	Playoffs
2002–03	50	41	5	2	2	231	136	86	1st QJAAAHL	Won Championship
2003–04	50	20	22	5	3	212	205	48	8th QJAAAHL	
2004–05	48	23	24	0	1	187	166	47	8th QJAAAHL	
2005–06	51	38	9	0	4	213	146	80	2nd QJAAAHL	Lost semi-final
2006–07	54	27	24	1	2	204	193	57	7th QJAAAHL	Lost quarter-final
2007–08	52	34	13	1	4	203	162	73	3rd QJAAAHL	Won Championship
2008–09	49	34	14	–	1	192	115	69	1st QJAAAHL	Won Championship
2009–10	51	30	16	–	5	219	173	65	6th QJAAAHL	Lost quarter-final
2010–11	49	37	9	–	3	231	163	77	1st QJAAAHL	Lost semi-final
2011–12	49	34	8	–	7	227	143	75	1st QJAAAHL	
2012–13	52	27	20	–	5	230	184	59	8th QJAAAHL	Lost semi-final
2013–14	52	27	20	–	5	230	184	59	3rd QJAAAHL	Lost final
