= Valleyfield Braves (2014) =

Men's junior AAA ice hockey team in Salaberry-de-Valleyfield, Quebec

Les Braves de Valleyfield
- City: Salaberry-de-Valleyfield, Quebec, Canada
- League: Quebec Junior Hockey League
- Division: Martin St-Louis
- Founded: 2004
- Home arena: Aréna Salaberry
- Colours: Black, red, yellow, white
- Owner: Multiple owners
- General manager: Bruce Richardson (2024–25)
- Head coach: Bruce Richardson (2024–25)
- Captain: James Swan (2024–25)
- Website: www.braves.qc.ca

Franchise history
- 2004–2007: College St. Lawrence Lions
- 2007–2008: Québec AssurExperts
- 2008–2010: Thetford Mines Filons
- 2010–2014: Loups de La Tuque; La Tuque Wolves
- 2014–present: Valleyfield Braves

Les Braves de Valleyfield or the Valleyfield Braves are a Canadian junior ice hockey team in the Quebec Junior Hockey League (LHJQ). They play in Salaberry-de-Valleyfield, Quebec at the Aréna Salaberry.

== History ==
As part of the College St. Lawrence, the team went by the name "St. Lawrence College of Québec Lions" during its first three seasons. After a modest first season, the Lions reached the playoffs in their second season. The 2005–06 season saw them reach the quarterfinals in the playoffs and achieve a winning regular season record.

In 2007, the team was renamed the Quebec AssurExperts.

In 2008, the team was purchased and moved to Thetford Mines and rebranded as the Thetford Mines Filons.

Wolves logo 2010–14

In 2010, the franchise was moved to La Tuque, Quebec and the team rebranded as the Loups de La Tuque (La Tuque Wolves).

In 2014, the team relocated to Valleyfield and regained the rights to the name and logo of the previous Valleyfield Braves franchise that left the Ligue de Hockey Junior AAA du Québec (LHJAAAQ; Quebec Junior AAA Hockey League, QJAAAHL) after the 2012–13 season to join the Ligue Nord-Américaine de Hockey (LNAH). Eleven games into the LNAH season, the original Valleyfield Braves franchise moved to Laval, Quebec and became the Laval Braves.

== Season-by-season record ==
Note: GP = Games Played, W = Wins, L = Losses, T = Ties, OTL = Overtime Losses, GF = Goals for, GA = Goals against

Season	GP	W	L	T	OTL	GF	GA	Points	Finish	Playoffs
College St. Lawrence Lions
2004–05	48	8	37	0	3	169	284	19	13th QJAAAHL	
2005–06	51	24	23	0	4	232	241	52	8th QJAAAHL	Lost quarter-final
2006–07	53	18	23	9	3	239	257	48	11th QJAAAHL	Lost Preliminary
Quebec AssurExperts
2007–08	52	25	22	4	1	251	219	55	10th QJAAAHL	
Thetford Mines Veins
2008–09	49	12	30	-	7	147	222	31	14th QJAAAHL	
2009–10	51	23	23	-	5	213	221	47	9th QJAAAHL	DNQ
La Tuque Wolves
2010–11	49	10	35	-	4	141	247	26	13th QJAAAHL	DNQ
2011–12	49	26	20	-	3	200	180	55	8th QJAAAHL	
2012–13	52	31	16	-	5	219	166	67	5th QJAAAHL	Lost quarter-final
2013–14	52	17	32	-	3	188	295	37	5th QJAAAHL-SL	Lost div. quarter-final
Valleyfield Braves
2014–15	52	16	35	-	1	215	294	33	5th of 5 Martin St. Louis; 14 of 14 LHJQ	Did not Qualify
2016–17	49	27	21	1	0	230	222	55	3rd of 6 Martin St. Louis; 5th of 12 LHJQ	Lost div. semi-final, 2–4 (Inouk)
2017–18	49	24	19	3	3	214	183	54	3rd of 6 Martin St. Louis; 6th of 12 LHJQ	Lost quarterfinal, 1–4 (Inouk)
2018–19	48	21	24	1	2	172	189	45	9th of 13 LHJQ	7th (2-2-0-2) x-over round Lost quarterfinal, 0–4 (Collège Français)
2020–21	48	33	13	1	1	233	144	68	6th of 13 QJHL	Playoffs cancelled due to covid-19
2021–2022	48	13	25	1	3	170	218	30	3rd of 4 West; 10th of 12 LHJQ	Lost quarterfinal, 3–4 (Panthers)
2022–2023	48	23	21	1	2	204	223	49	9th of 13 LHJQ	Won Playin Rd 2-1 (Est Rangers); Lost quarterfinal, 0–4 (Collège Français)
2023–2024	48	24	20	3	1	191	196	52	9th of 13 LHJQ	Won Playin Rd 2-1 (Inouk); Lost quarterfinal, 1–4 (Cobras)
2024–2025	48	37	9	1	1	283	189	76	1st of 13 LHJQ	Won Quarterfinal, 4-0 (Panthers); Won Semifinals 4-3 (Indigp); Won League Finals 4-2 (Collège Français); Advance to Centennial Cup

== Centennial Cup ==
CANADIAN NATIONAL CHAMPIONSHIPS
Centennial Cup Format 2022 and forward Maritime Junior Hockey League, Quebec Junior Hockey League, Central Canada Hockey League, Ontario Junior Hockey League, Northern Ontario Junior Hockey League, Superior International Junior Hockey League, Manitoba Junior Hockey League, Saskatchewan Junior Hockey League, Alberta Junior Hockey League, and Host. The BCHL declared itself an independent league and there is no BC representative.
Round-robin play in two 5-team pools with top three in pool advancing to determine a Champion.

Year	Round-robin	Record	Standing	Quarterfinal	Semifinal	Championship
2025	L, Rockland Nationals (CCHL), 4–9; L, Calgary Canucks (Host), 6–11; L, Edmundston Blizzard (MarJHL), 2–7; OTL, Melfort Mustangs (SJHL), 4-5	0-0-3-1	5th of 5 Group B	did not qualified	did not qualified	did not qualified
