= Quebec Junior Hockey League =

Canadian Junior A ice hockey league

- Current season or competition: 2026–27
- Region: Quebec
- Commissioner: Kevin Figsby
- Former names: Quebec Provincial Junior Hockey League (1988–1998); Quebec Junior AAA Hockey League (1998–2014)
- Founded: 1988
- No. of teams: 13
- Recent champions: Collège Français de Longueuil (2026)
- Most successful club: Collège Français de Longueuil
- Headquarters: Longueuil, Quebec
- Website: www.lhjaaaq.com

The Ligue de hockey junior AAA du Québec (LHJAAAQ) or Quebec Junior Hockey League (QJHL) is a Hockey Québec Canadian junior ice hockey league and is a member of Hockey Canada and the Canadian Junior Hockey League (CJHL).

== History ==
The Quebec Junior Hockey League is an offshoot of the Quebec Junior A Hockey League that operated from 1972 to 1982. Founded in 1988, the QJHL has been a rather strong league, with three Central Canadian Champions (Dudley Hewitt Cup) in its early years: the Longueuil Sieurs in 1990 and the Chateauguay Elites in 1993 and 1994. In 1994–95 they were grouped into the Eastern Canadian region to compete for the Fred Page Cup. The Joliette Nationals won the first Fred Page Cup in 1995.

Quebec Junior "AAA" Logo until 2014.

In 2002–03, Champlain College Lennoxville got a team to play in the LHJAAAQ - Lennoxville Cougars, based on the campus of College Champlain and Bishop's University. The Cougars, who were coached by former NHLer Stéphan Lebeau formed a discipline style of hockey. The method paid off, and Lennoxville captured the Napa Cup as league champions and won the Fred Page Cup. Lennoxville finished the Royal Bank Cup 1–3, the Cougars exited the tournament with semi-finals loss to the Camrose Kodiaks of the AJHL.

In 2003–04, the CJAHL and the LHJAAAQ saw the St-Eustache Gladiateurs ranked #5 overall in Canada. However, the Gladiateurs lost the finals to the Valleyfield Braves. Because Valleyfield was hosting the Fred Page Cup, the Gladiateurs got a berth in the tournament. Saint-Eustache and Valleyfield each held a 2–0 tournament record going into the all-LHJAAAQ match-up that would decide the winner and who gets a bye to the championship finals. Valleyfield won the game 4–0, and Saint-Eustache then lost to the Nepean Raiders 3–2 in double-overtime. The Valleyfield Braves lost the championship game 4–0 to Nepean.

In 2014, 12-year president Richard Morency announced his resignation, but staying on until the transition to the new leadership. The league also announced that it was re-branding itself the Quebec Junior Hockey League (dropping the "AAA" designation) and introduced the corresponding new league logo. The summer also saw the return of the Valleyfield Braves to the League. Owners of the team purchased the LaTuque Wolves, regained rights to the Braves name and logo and brought the team back to the Aréna Salaberry. Another long-time QJHL member, Kahnawake Condors, who were established in 1999 moved to Chambly, Quebec, to be re-branded as the Chambly Forts. Shortly after that move, the Gatineau Mustangs of the Eastern Ontario Junior Hockey League made the jump to the league as the Gatineau Flames, becoming the first Hull-based team since the Aylmer Extreme that had lasted one season in 2000–01. Several weeks after announcing the Gatineau Flames as a member, the Flames purchased the Lachine Maroons and absorbed the franchise rights. The league expelled the Sherbrooke Cougars because the league considered them as a collegiate team and had ties to Bishop's University. The Saint-Hyacinthe Laureats withdrew from the league, possibly in conjunction with the Cougars. The league split into two divisions.

== Teams ==
Team	Centre
Beauce-Appalaches Condors	Saint-Georges
Côte-du-Sud Everest	Montmagny
Gatineau Flames	Gatineau
Granby Indigo	Granby
Joliette Prédateurs	Joliette
Laval Prime	Laval
Longueuil Collège Français	Longueuil
Montreal Rangers	Montréal
Montreal Phoenix	Montréal
Princeville Titan	Princeville
St-Jérôme Panthères	Saint-Jérôme
Terrebonne Cobras	Terrebonne
Valleyfield Braves	Salaberry-de-Valleyfield

Map of LHJAAAQ teams

== League champions ==
Year	Champion	Runner-up	Series
1989	Longueuil Collège Français
1990	Longueuil Collège Français
1991	Montreal Olympics
1992	Joliette Nationals
1993	Châteauguay Élites
1994	Châteauguay Élites
1995	Joliette Nationals
1996	Contrecoeur Éperviers
1997	Longueuil Collège Français
1998	Coaticook Frontaliers
1999	Valleyfield Braves	Contrecoeur Blackhawks	4–3
2000	Coaticook Frontaliers
2001	St-Jérôme Panthers
2002	Valleyfield Braves	Longueuil Collège Français	4–3
2003	Lennoxville Cougars	Longueuil Collège Français	4–0
2004	Valleyfield Braves	St-Eustache Gladiateurs	4–1
2005	Vaudreuil Mustangs	St-Jérôme Panthers	4–1
2006	Joliette Action	College Lafleche Titans	4–2
2007	Joliette Action	Longueuil Collège Français	4–0
2008	Sherbrooke Cougars	Joliette Action	4–2
2009	Sherbrooke Cougars	Princeville Titans	4–0
2010	Terrebonne Cobras	Longueuil Collège Français	4–1
2011	Longueuil Collège Français	Valleyfield Braves	4–1
2012	Princeville Titans	St-Jérôme Panthers	4–1
2013	Longueuil Collège Français	Lachine Maroons	4–0
2014	Granby Inouk	Sherbrooke Cougars	4–3
2015	Longueuil Collège Français	Sherbrooke Cougars	4–3
2016	Longueuil Collège Français	Granby Inouk	4–0
2017	Terrebonne Cobras	Longueuil Collège Français	4–1
2018	Longueuil Collège Français	Terrebonne Cobras	4–1
2019	Princeville Titans	Terrebonne Cobras	4–1
2020	Cancelled
2021	Cancelled
2022	Longueuil Collège Français	Beauce-Appalaches Cegep Condors	4–1
2023	Terrebonne Cobras	Beauce-Appalaches Cegep Condors	4–3
2024	Longueuil Collège Français	L'Everest de la Côte-du-Sud	4–3
2025	Valleyfield Braves	Longueuil Collège Français	4–2
2026	Collège Français de Longueuil	Cégep Beauce-Appalaches Condors	4–0

== Former member teams ==
- Kahnawake Condors / Chambly Forts - relocated to Chambly in 2015, folded prior to 2021–22 season
- L'Extreme D'Aylmer - folded after 2000–01 season
- Lachine Maroons - 2015 relocate to Gatineau Flames
- La Tuque Wolves - renewed Valleyfield Braves franchise
- Les Husky de Cowansville - folded after 1999–2000 season
- Le National de Joliette - ceased operations mid-season (January 2000)
- Le Junior Canadiens de Montreal - folded after 1999–2000 season
- Les Dragons de Saint-Hyacinthe - folded after 1999–2000 season
- Les Chevaliers de St-Jean - folded after 2001–02 season
- Montreal-North Arctic - folded after 2018–19 season. Founded 2002 as the St-Eustache Patriotes.
- Saint-Félicien Multiconcessionnaire - folded after 2008–09 season
- Saint-Hyacinthe Lauréats - 2015 withdrew from league
- Saint-Lazare Revolution - sold 2019. Remain in Saint Lazare but re-branded West Island Shamrocks
- Sherbrooke Cougars - 2015 expelled from league
- Thetford Mines Filons - relocated to La Tuque Wolves
- Valleyfield Braves (defunct) - left league to join LNAH
- Vaudreuil-Dorion Mustangs - sold and relocated to Saint-Lazare (2017)

== Timeline of teams in the QJHL ==
- 1988 - Black Lake Miners play in 1988 Centennial Cup playdowns as Quebec's only Jr. A team
- 1988 - Quebec Provincial Junior Hockey League is officially founded
- 1990 - St. Antoine Rapidos join league
- 1990 - Laval-Bourassa Cobras join league
- 1991 - St. Antoine Rapidos become Louiseville Jaguars
- 1991 - Laval-Bourassa Cobras become Montreal-Nord Cobras
- 1991 - Ste-Marie Beaucerons join league
- 1992 - Ste-Marie Beaucerons become Loretteville Riverains
- 1992 - Louisville Jaguars become Saint-Jerome Panthers
- 1994 - Coaticook Frontaliers join league
- 1994 - Valleyfield Elites join league
- 1995 - Lachine Maroons join league
- 1996 - Warwick Titans join league
- 1998 - Quebec Provincial Junior Hockey League becomes Quebec Junior AAA Hockey League
- 1998 - Joliette National cease operations in January 1998
- 1998 - Valleyfield Elites become Valleyfield Braves
- 1999 - Kahnawake Condors join league
- 2000 - Montreal Junior Canadiens fold
- 2000 - Aylmer Extreme join league and fold after the 2000–01 season
- 2000 - Cowansville Husky fold
- 2000 - Saint-Hyacinthe Dragons fold
- 2002 - Saint-Eustache Gladiateurs join league
- 2002 - Lennoxville Cougars join league
- 2003 - Lennoxville Cougars become College Champlain Cougars
- 2002 - Warwick Titans become College Lefleche Titans
- 2002 - St-Jean Chevaliers fold
- 2003 - l’Ile Perrot Mustangs join league
- 2003 - La Plaine Cobras become Terrebonne Cobras
- 2004 - St-Lawrence of Quebec Lions join league
- 2004 - l’Ile Perrot Mustangs become Vaudreuil Mustangs
- 2005 - Coaticook Frontaliers become Granby Inouk
- 2006 - Saint-Eustache Gladiateurs become Saint-Eastache Patriotes
- 2005 - Joliette Action join league
- 2007 - St-Lawrence of Quebec Lions become Quebec AssurSports
- 2007 - College Champlain Cougars become Sherbrooke Cougars
- 2008 - Saint-Eustache Patriotes become Sainte-Therese Nordiques
- 2008 - Quebec AssurExperts move and become Thetford Mines Filons
- 2008 - Sainte-Agathe Montagnards join league
- 2008 - College Lefleche Titans become Princeville Titans
- 2008 - Saint-Felicien Multiconcessionnaire fold after three seasons
- 2009 - Sainte-Therese Nordiques become Rousseau-Sports Junior AAA Laval
- 2009 - Joliette Action become Joliette Traffic
- 2010 - Thetford Mines Filons become La Tuque Wolves
- 2010 - Rousseau-Sports Junior AAA Laval become Laval Arctic
- 2011 - Joliette Traffic become Montreal-Est Rangers
- 2011 - Laval Arctic become St. Leonard Arctic
- 2013 - Valleyfield Braves dissolve franchise to seek membership with the Ligue Nord-Americaine de Hockey (LNAH)
- 2014 - La Toque Wolves relocate to Valleyfield and become the Valleyfield Braves. The ownership reclaims the rights to the Braves name and logo
- 2014 - League shortens name to Quebec Junior Hockey League
- 2015 - Kahnawake Condors relocate to Chambly and become Chambly Forts
- 2015 - Gatineau Flames purchase Lachine Maroons franchise and join league from Eastern Ontario Junior Hockey League
- 2015 - Sherbrooke Cougars expelled from league
- 2015 - Saint-Hyacinthe Lauréats withdraw from league
- 2016 - League returns to the full name of Quebec Junior AAA Hockey League
- 2017 - Vaudreuil-Dorion Mustangs sold and relocated to St-Lazare Revolution.
- 2017 - Ste-Agathe Montagnards are sold and relocated to St-Gabriel-de-Brandon
- 2017 - Côte-du-Sud Everest join league and began play in 2018–19
- 2018 - St-Léonard Arctic relocates to Montreal-North
- 2018 - St-Lazare Revolution relocated to Pierrefonds, renamed Lac-St-Louis Revolution
- 2019 - Lac-St-Louis Revolution renamed as West Island Shamrocks
- 2019 - Montreal-North Arctic fold
- 2019 - Franchise awarded to Cegep de Beauce-Appalaches Condors. The team was set to begin during the 2020–21 season, but the debut was pushed back to 2021–22 due to the COVID-19 pandemic in Quebec
- 2020 - St-Gabriel-de-Brandon relocates to Joliette, renamed to Joliette Prédateurs
- 2021 - Chambly Forts fold
- 2022 - West Island Shamrocks rebranded as Montreal Phoenix
- 2022 - New franchise awarded to Laval, under the name of Laval VC
- 2023 - Montreal-East Rangers move to Montreal, renamed Montreal Rangers
- 2024 - Laval VC is renamed to Laval Junior AAA

== Sources ==
- La Rose, Jason (5 May 2026). "Road to the 2026 Centennial Cup: Collège Français de Longueuil". hockeycanada.ca. Hockey Canada.
