= Granby Indigo =

L'Indigo de Granby
- City: Granby, Quebec, Canada
- League: Quebec Junior Hockey League
- Division: Martin St-Louis
- Founded: c. 1994
- Home arena: Aréna Léonard-Grondin
- Colours: Beige, navy blue, and blue
- Owners: Marco Bernard and a shareholding group
- General manager: Patrice Bosch
- Head coach: Patrice Bosch (2017-18)
- Media: La Voix de l'Est

Franchise history
- c. 1994-2005: Coaticook Frontaliers
- 2005-2024: Granby Inouk
- 2024-Present: Granby Indigo

L'Indigo de Granby are a Canadian junior ice hockey team from Granby, Quebec, Canada. They are a part of the Quebec Junior Hockey League.

== History ==
The Frontaliers were Quebec champions in 1998 and 2000.

After the 2023–24 season, the team re-branded to the Granby Indigo.

== Season-by-season record ==
Note: GP = Games Played, W = Wins, L = Losses, T = Ties, OTL = Overtime Losses, GF = Goals for, GA = Goals against

Season	GP	W	L	T	OTL	GF	GA	Points	Finish	Playoffs
1994-95	48	27	15	-	6	251	235	60	5th QPJHL	
1995-96	48	16	28	-	4	217	274	36	10th QPJHL	
1996-97	48	23	19	-	6	219	191	52	7th QPJHL	
1997-98	54	33	20	-	1	281	201	67	3rd QJAAAHL	Won league
1998-99	52	39	11	-	2	276	163	80	1st QJAAAHL	
1999-00	58	42	13	-	3	330	192	87	1st QJAAAHL	Won league
2000-01	49	27	14	4	4	225	183	62	4th QJAAAHL	
2001-02	53	36	14	0	3	280	230	75	4th QJAAAHL	
2002-03	50	25	19	4	2	185	195	56	5th QJAAAHL	
2003-04	50	23	16	3	8	220	214	57	7th QJAAAHL	
2004-05	48	17	22	4	5	199	199	43	10th QJAAAHL	
2005-06	51	16	29	0	6	163	249	38	11th QJAAAHL	DNQ
2006-07	53	24	23	4	2	238	254	54	9th QJAAAHL	Lost preliminary
2007-08	52	36	12	1	3	304	211	76	2nd QJAAAHL	
2008-09	49	31	14	-	4	264	196	66	4th QJAAAHL	
2009-10	51	30	18	-	3	228	204	65	5th QJAAAHL	Lost semi-final
2010-11	49	22	25	-	2	207	240	46	9th QJAAAHL	Lost preliminary
2011-12	49	33	11	-	5	253	148	71	2nd QJAAAHL	
2012-13	52	36	13	-	3	241	184	75	3rd QJAAAHL	Lost quarter-final
2013-14	52	39	11	-	2	303	207	80	2nd QJAAAHL	Won league
2014-15	-	-	-	-	-	-	-	-	-	-
2015-16	55	32	20	2	1	257	230	67	3 - 6 St. Louis; 6th of 12 LHJQ	Won quarterfinals, 4-0 (Mustangs); Won semifinals, 4-3 (Montagnards); Lost league finals, 0-4 (Collège Français)
2016-17	49	35	12	1	1	281	187	72	2 - 6 St. Louis; 3rd of 12 LHJQ	Won div. semifinal, 4-2 (Braves); Lost league semifinals 2–4 (Cobras)
2017-18	48	35	9	3	1	231	133	74	2 - 6 St. Louis; 3rd of 12 LHJQ	Won quarterfinal, 4-1 (Braves); Lost semifinals 0–4 (Collège Français)
2018-19	48	35	11	2	0	223	135	72	4th of 13 LHJQ	5th place (4-2) X-over series Won quarterfinal, 4-0 (Fort); Lost semifinals 3–4 (Cobras)
2019-20	48	19	26	3	0	209	248	41	4th of 6 91.1 Sports; 7th of 12 LHJQ	Playoffs cancelled due to COVID-19
2020-21	Season lost due to COVID-19 restrictions									
2021-22	42	19	19	3	1	174	185	42	3rd of 4 East; 8h of 12 LHJQ	Lost quarterfinal, 2-4 (Cobras)
2022-23	48	24	19	3	2	200	194	53	6th of 13 LHJQ	Lost quarterfinal, 2-4 (Titans)
2023-24	48	24	21	3	0	199	203	51	9th of 13 LHJQ	Lost qualifying, 1-2 (Braves)
Granby Indigo
2024-25	48	32	14	1	1	226	183	66	4th of 13 LHJQ	Won quarterfinals 4-3, 1-2 (Everest); Lost semifinals 3-4 (Braves)

== Fred Page Cup ==
Eastern Canada Championships
MHL - QAAAJHL - CCHL - Host
Round robin play with 2nd vs 3rd in semi-final to advance against 1st in the finals.

Year	Round robin	Record	Standing	Semifinal	Gold medal game
2014	OTL, Truro Bearcats 4-5; L, Carleton Place Canadians 2-4; L, St-Jérôme Panthers 2-4	0-2-1	4th of 4	n/a	n/a
