= 2023–24 CCHL season =

63rd season of the CCHL

- League: CCHL
- Sport: Ice hockey
- Duration: Regular season September–April
- Games: 55
- Teams: 12
- Total attendance: 78,810

League championship
- Bogart Cup: Navan Grads
- Runners-up: Smiths Falls Bears

CCHL seasons
- ← 2022–23 2024–25 →

The 2023–24 CCHL season was the 63rd season of the Central Canada Hockey League (CCHL). The Navan Grads won the league championship Bogart Cup for the first time in the franchise's 28-year history and went on to compete at the 2024 Centennial Cup national championship tournament in Oakville, Ontario.

== Season highlights ==
League commissioner Kevin Abrams resigned at the end of the 2022–23 CCHL season after serving for 17 years in the role. Sean Marcellus, who was appointed as interim commissioner in June 2023, resigned in April 2024 and took up the position of director of hockey operations for the Eastern Ontario Junior Hockey League.

The Navan Grads won the league championship Bogart Cup for the first time in the franchise's 28-year history. The team's goaltender, Jaeden Nelson, received the league's top rookie, top prospect and top goaltender awards. He went on to receive the top goaltender award at the 2024 Centennial Cup national championship tournament.

=== Awards ===
- Most Valuable Player: Jace Letourneau (Renfrew Wolves)
- Top Rookie: Jaeden Nelson (Navan Grads)
- Outstanding Defenceman: Xavier Laurent (Rockland Nationals)
- Sportsmanship/ability award: Kyle Leonard (Rockland Nationals)
- Top Prospect: Jaeden Nelson (Navan Grads)
- Outstanding graduating player: Shamus Stevenson (Smiths Falls Bears)
- Arthur K. Nielsen scholarship award: Bill Gourgon (Carleton Place Canadians)
- Scoring champion: Jace Letourneau (Renfrew Wolves)
- Top Goaltender: Jaeden Nelson (Navan Grads)
- Top Coach: Marty Abrams (Navan Grads)
- Top General Manager: Pat Malloy (Smiths Falls Bears)

Source: "Season award archives". thecchl.ca.

== Regular season ==
The regular season opened on 14 September 2023 and ran until 17 March 2024. Each team played 55 games, playing against each opponent 5 times. While teams were nominally assigned to either the Robinson division or the Yzerman division, the top 8 teams overall advanced to the playoffs regardless of their division assignment.

Standings
Rank	Team	GP	W	L	OTL	SOL	GF	GA	Pts
1	Navan Grads	55	41	9	3	2	235	144	87
2	Smiths Falls Bears	55	36	15	1	3	193	128	76
3	Cornwall Colts	55	33	17	1	4	201	143	71
4	Rockland Nationals	55	32	19	3	1	202	175	68
5	Renfrew Wolves	55	32	20	3	0	233	201	67
6	Hawkesbury Hawks	55	27	22	3	3	179	179	60
7	Carleton Place Canadians	55	28	24	3	0	175	191	59
8	Pembroke Lumber Kings	55	24	24	5	2	146	179	55
9	Kemptville 73's	55	25	26	1	3	160	170	54
10	Ottawa Jr. Senators	55	24	28	3	0	146	172	51
11	Nepean Raiders	55	20	28	5	2	152	204	47
12	Brockville Braves	55	8	40	5	2	136	272	23

Source: "2023–24 Central CCHL standings". hockeydb.com.

== Post-season ==
2024 League championship
Bogart Cup

Tournament details
- Dates: 20 March – 1 May
- Teams: 8
- Defending champions: Ottawa Jr. Senators

Final positions
- Champions: Navan Grads
- Runners-up: Smiths Falls Bears

Tournament statistics
- Games played: 38
- Goals scored: 223 (5.87 per game)
- Attendance: 22,207 (584 per game)

The Navan Grads defeated the Pembroke Lumber Kings, Rockland Nationals, and finally the Smiths Falls Bears to win the league championship Bogart Cup for the first time in the franchise's 28-year history. The Grads went on to represent the league at the 2024 Centennial Cup national championship tournament in Oakville, Ontario.

Quarterfinals
Navan	4
Pembroke	2
Rockland	4
Renfrew	2
Smiths Falls	4
Carleton Place	1
Cornwall	4
Hawkesbury	1

Semifinals
Navan	4
Rockland	1
Smiths Falls	4
Cornwall	1

Bogart Cup Finals
Navan	4
Smiths Falls	2

Source: "2023–24 CCHL playoff results". hockeydb.com.

=== First round: Navan vs. Pembroke ===
Navan won the series, 4–2.

Game	Date	Score	Location	Time	Attendance
1	March 20	Pembroke 1, Navan 5	Navan Memorial Centre	2:10	243
2	March 22	Navan 2, Pembroke 1 (OT)	Pembroke Memorial Centre	2:58	701
3	March 24	Pembroke 3, Navan 1	Navan Memorial Centre	2:00	447
4	March 27	Navan 1, Pembroke 5	Pembroke Memorial Centre	2:13	755
5	March 29	Pembroke 4, Navan 5 (2OT)	Navan Memorial Centre	3:54	655
6	March 31	Navan 4, Pembroke 3	Pembroke Memorial Centre	2:20	1,288

Source: "2023–24 CCHL playoff results". hockeydb.com.

=== First round: Rockland vs. Renfrew ===
Rockland won the series, 4–2.

Game	Date	Score	Location	Time	Attendance
1	March 22	Renfrew 2, Rockland 1	Clarence-Rockland Arena	2:07	623
2	March 23	Rockland 7, Renfrew 0	MyFM Centre Recreation Complex	2:05	517
3	March 28	Renfrew 3, Rockland 4 (OT)	Clarence-Rockland Arena	2:18	855
4	March 30	Rockland 5, Renfrew 1	MyFM Centre Recreation Complex	2:09	583
5	March 31	Renfrew 1, Rockland 8	Clarence-Rockland Arena	1:53	657
6	April 2	Rockland 3, Renfrew 1	MyFM Centre Recreation Complex	2:08	509

Source: "2023–24 CCHL playoff results". hockeydb.com.

=== First round: Smiths Falls vs. Carleton Place ===
Smiths Falls won the series, 4–1.

Game	Date	Score	Location	Time	Attendance
1	March 22	Carleton Place 2, Smiths Falls 7	Smiths Falls Memorial Community Centre	2:28	480
2	March 24	Smiths Falls 4, Carleton Place 3 (OT)	Carleton Place Arena	2:10	300
3	March 26	Carleton Place 4, Smiths Falls 1	Smiths Falls Memorial Community Centre	2:14	358
4	March 27	Smiths Falls 5, Carleton Place 2	Carleton Place Arena	2:20	270
5	March 29	Carleton Place 2, Smiths Falls 6	Smiths Falls Memorial Community Centre	2:10	814

Source: "2023–24 CCHL playoff results". hockeydb.com.

=== First round: Cornwall vs. Hawkesbury ===
Cornwall won the series, 4–1.

Game	Date	Score	Location	Time	Attendance
1	March 21	Hawkesbury 2, Cornwall 3 (2OT)	Cornwall Civic Complex	3:03	1,123
2	March 22	Cornwall 1, Hawkesbury 2 (3OT)	Robert Hartley Sports Complex	4:09	979
3	March 24	Hawkesbury 1, Cornwall 6	Cornwall Civic Complex	1:43	1,017
4	March 26	Cornwall 3, Hawkesbury 2	Robert Hartley Sports Complex	2:03	877
5	March 28	Hawkesbury 2, Cornwall 6	Cornwall Civic Complex	2:01	1,089

Source: "2023–24 CCHL playoff results". hockeydb.com.

=== Semifinal: Navan vs. Rockland ===
Navan won the series, 4–1.

Game	Date	Score	Location	Time	Attendance
1	April 5	Rockland 4, Navan 5	Navan Memorial Centre	2:01	605
2	April 7	Navan 1, Rockland 0 (OT)	Clarence-Rockland Arena	2:43	645
3	April 10	Rockland 6, Navan 4	Navan Memorial Centre	2:14	625
4	April 12	Navan 5, Rockland 3	Clarence-Rockland Arena	2:04	1,025
5	April 14	Rockland 0, Navan 1	Navan Memorial Centre	2:05	672

Source: "2023–24 CCHL playoff results". hockeydb.com.

=== Semifinal: Smiths Falls vs. Cornwall ===
Smiths Falls won the series, 4–1.

Game	Date	Score	Location	Time	Attendance
1	April 5	Cornwall 1, Smiths Falls 2	Smiths Falls Memorial Community Centre	2:22	825
2	April 7	Smiths Falls 2, Cornwall 1	Cornwall Civic Complex	2:01	1,324
3	April 9	Cornwall 4, Smiths Falls 1	Smiths Falls Memorial Community Centre	2:10	505
4	April 11	Smiths Falls 4, Cornwall 3 (OT)	Cornwall Civic Complex	2:27	1,425
5	April 14	Cornwall 1, Smiths Falls 6	Smiths Falls Memorial Community Centre	2:11	639

Source: "2023–24 CCHL playoff results". hockeydb.com.

=== Final: Navan vs. Smiths Falls ===
Navan won the series, 4–2.

Game	Date	Score	Location	Time	Attendance
1	April 19	Smiths Falls 2, Navan 3 (OT)	Navan Memorial Centre	3:06	824
2	April 21	Navan 3, Smiths Falls 4 (OT)	Smiths Falls Memorial Community Centre	2:33	1,003
3	April 24	Smiths Falls 1, Navan 4	Navan Memorial Centre	1:47	735
4	April 26	Navan 3, Smiths Falls 2	Smiths Falls Memorial Community Centre	2:02	1,113
5	April 28	Smiths Falls 5, Navan 0	Navan Memorial Centre	2:22	1,111
6	May 1	Navan 5, Smiths Falls 2	Smiths Falls Memorial Community Centre	2:03	1,185

Source: "2023–24 CCHL playoff results". hockeydb.com.

== National championship ==
2024 National championship
Centennial Cup
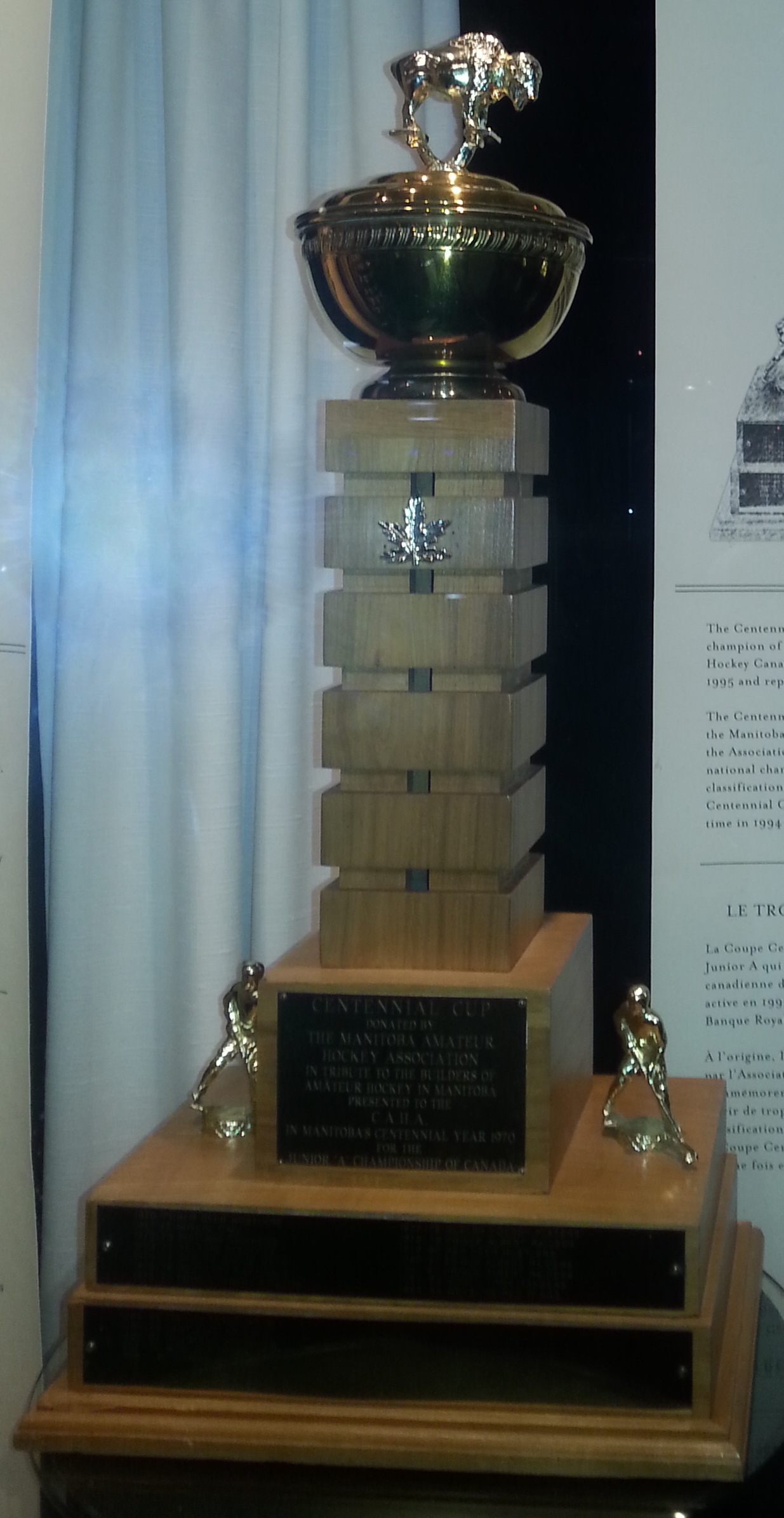

Tournament details
- City: Oakville, Ontario
- Venue: Sixteen Mile Sports Complex
- Dates: 9–19 May 2024
- Teams: 10
- Host team: Oakville Blades

Final positions
- Champions: Collingwood Blues
- Runners-up: Melfort Mustangs

Tournament statistics
- Games played: 25

Awards
- MVP: Julien Gervais

Official website
- Hockey Canada

The 2024 Centennial Cup national championship tournament took place at the Sixteen Mile Sports Complex in Oakville, Ontario from 9 – 19 May 2024. The competition included all nine CJHL champions; the Calgary Canucks of the AJHL; the Melfort Mustangs of the SJHL; the Winkler Flyers of the MJHL; the Sioux Lookout Bombers of the SIJHL; the Greater Sudbury Cubs of the NOJHL; the Collingwood Blues of the OJHL; the Navan Grads of the CCHL; the Collège Français de Longueuil of the QJHL; the Miramichi Timberwolves of the MHL; and hosts the Oakville Blades of the OJHL.

The Navan Grads recorded two wins and two losses in the preliminary round. They then advanced to the quarterfinals where they lost to the Miramichi Timberwolves by a score of 8-4 and were eliminated from competition.

=== Round Robin ===
The top 3 teams from each group advanced to the playoffs, and the 1st place teams in each group had a bye to the semifinals.

	Group A	CB	CC	NG	GSC	CFL
1	Collingwood Blues		5-4	3-2	10-2	8-0
2	Calgary Canucks	4-5		4-3	3-2	5-1
3	Navan Grads	2-3	3-4		5-1	5-1
4	Greater Sudbury Cubs	2-10	2-3	1-5		6-0
5	Collège Français de Longueuil	0-8	1-5	1-5	0-6	

	Group B	MM	MT	WF	OB	SLB
1	Melfort Mustangs		4-1	6-5	3-1	5-3
2	Miramichi Timberwolves	1-4		3-2	7-4	5-3
3	Winkler Flyers	5-6	2-3		4-0	4-2
4	Oakville Blades	1-3	4-7	0-4		5-2
5	Sioux Lookout; Bombers	3-5	3-5	2-4	2-5	

=== Playoffs ===
The Collingwood Blues won the tournament after defeating the Miramichi Timberwolves by a score of 5-2 in the semifinals, and the Melfort Mustangs by a score of 1-0 in the final.

Quarterfinals
Miramichi Timberwolves	8
Navan Grads	4
Calgary Canucks	4
Winkler Flyers	2

Semifinals
Collingwood Blues	5
Miramichi Timberwolves	2
Melfort Mustangs	2
Calgary Canucks	1

Finals
Collingwood Blues	1
Melfort Mustangs	0

== Sources ==
- Brown, Ben (29 April 2024). "Centennial Cup estimated to bring $5 million for Oakville businesses". Oakville News. Village Media.
- "2024 Centennial Cup Guide & Record Book" (PDF). hockeycanada.ca. Hockey Canada.
- "2025 Centennial Cup Guide & Record Book" (PDF). hockeycanada.ca. Hockey Canada.
- "Sean Marcellus appointed as CCHL interim commissioner". cjhlhockey.com. 14 May 2023.
- "Sean Marcellus Has Resigned as Interim Commissioner". thecchl.ca (Press release). 19 April 2024.
- "CCHL Recap | Navan Grads Win The Bogart Cup". thecchl.ca. 2 May 2024.
- Malone, Mark (8 May 2024). "Local hockey: Colin Holmes shoots for Centennial Cup national championship". Chatham Daily News. Postmedia.
