= 2019–20 CCHL season =

59th season of the CCHL

- League: Central Canada Hockey League
- Sport: Ice hockey
- Duration: Regular season September–March
- Games: 62
- Teams: 12

League championship
- Bogart Cup: None
- Season MVP: Devon Levi (Carleton Place Canadians)
- Top scorer: Luke Grainger (Hawkesbury Hawks)
- Finals champions: None

CCHL seasons
- ← 2018–19 2020–21 →

The 2019–20 CCHL season was the 59th season of the Central Canada Hockey League (CCHL). It was the first season in league history in which no team was awarded the league championship Bogart Cup due to the COVID-19 pandemic forcing the cancellation of the playoffs. The cancellation was announced on 12 March 2020, after the completion of the regular season, but before the completion of the post-season.

== Season highlights ==
The Carleton Place Canadians finished the regular season in first place. On 12 March 2020, the league cancelled all events indefinitely due to the COVID-19 pandemic. The cancellation came after the completion of the regular season, but before the completion of the post-season. Consequently, no team was awarded the league championship Bogart Cup.

=== Awards ===
Devon Levi, rookie goaltender for the Carleton Place Canadians, received awards as the league's most valuable player, top prospect and top goaltender. He also received national recognition as the CJHL's most valuable player, top goaltender and top rookie.

- Most Valuable Player: Devon Levi (Carleton Place Canadians)
- Top Rookie: Dovar Tinling (Hawkesbury Hawks)
- Outstanding Defenceman: Brett Thorne (Carleton Place Canadians)
- Sportsmanship/ability award: Elliott McDermott (Carleton Place Canadians)
- Top Prospect: Devon Levi (Carleton Place Canadians)
- Outstanding graduating player: Luke Grainger (Hawkesbury Hawks)
- Arthur K. Nielsen scholarship award: Elliott McDermott (Carleton Place Canadians)
- Scoring champion: Luke Grainger (Hawkesbury Hawks)
- Top Goaltender: Devon Levi (Carleton Place Canadians)
- Top Coach: Jason Clarke (Carleton Place Canadians)
- Top General Manager: Jason Clarke (Carleton Place Canadians)

Source: "Season award archives". thecchl.ca.

== Regular season ==
The top 8 teams overall were meant to advance to the post-season. The regular season concluded on 8 March 2020, a few days before the COVID-19 pandemic forced the cancellation of the post-season.

Standings
Rank	Team	GP	W	L	OTL	SOL	GF	GA	Pts
1	Carleton Place Canadians	62	49	7	4	2	263	139	104
2	Rockland Nationals	62	39	19	1	3	254	183	82
3	Brockville Braves	62	36	16	3	7	213	173	82
4	Hawkesbury Hawks	62	36	24	2	0	220	182	74
5	Smiths Falls Bears	62	33	24	3	2	223	216	71
6	Ottawa Jr. Senators	62	34	25	3	0	207	175	71
7	Pembroke Lumber Kings	62	32	27	2	1	187	215	67
8	Kanata Lasers	62	26	28	2	6	210	229	60
9	Navan Grads	62	29	32	1	0	204	229	59
10	Kemptville 73's	62	26	31	4	1	182	230	57
11	Cornwall Colts	62	21	35	1	5	161	222	48
12	Nepean Raiders	62	11	48	1	2	148	279	25

Source: "2019–20 Central CCHL standings". hockeydb.com.

== Post-season ==
The first and only match of the playoffs took place on 11 March 2020 between the Brockville Braves and defending champions the Ottawa Jr. Senators, with the Braves winning by a score of 4-1. All of the remaining matches were cancelled due to the COVID-19 pandemic.

== See also ==
- COVID-19 pandemic in Ontario
- Timeline of the COVID-19 pandemic in Ontario (2020)

== Sources ==
- "Season award archives". thecchl.ca.
- "CJHL awards". cjhlhockey.com.
- "2019–20 Central CCHL standings". hockeydb.com.
- Warren, Ken (1 December 2020). "WARREN: The hockey world pays tribute to CCHL giant Lou Nistico". Ottawa Sun. Postmedia.
- Westendorp, Jennifer (30 August 2019). "Kemptville 73's hit the ice next week". My Kemptville Now.
- Bramburger, Jamie (8 August 2020). "Peter White almost missed his chance to tear up the CCHL record books". pembrokeobserver.com. Postmedia.
- Rodrigues, Gabby (17 March 2020). "Ontario government declares state of emergency amid coronavirus pandemic". Global News. Corus Entertainment.
- "CCHL cancels play and all activities until further notice". thecchl.ca (Press release). 13 March 2020.
- "CJHL announces cancellation of 2020 season, until further notice, due to COVID-19 pandemic". cjhlhockey.com (Press release). 12 March 2020.
