= 2022–23 CCHL season =

62nd season of the CCHL

- League: Central Canada Hockey League
- Sport: Ice hockey
- Duration: Regular season September–April
- Games: 55
- Teams: 12
- Total attendance: 77,274

League championship
- Bogart Cup: Ottawa Jr. Senators
- Runners-up: Smiths Falls Bears

CCHL seasons
- ← 2021–22 2023–24 →

The 2022–23 CCHL season was the 62nd season of the Central Canada Hockey League (CCHL). The Ottawa Jr. Senators won their fourth straight league championship Bogart Cup. The team went on to compete for the 2023 Centennial Cup national championship in Portage la Prairie, Manitoba and were eliminated by the Brooks Bandits of the Alberta Junior Hockey League in the semifinals.

== Season highlights ==
League commissioner Kevin Abrams resigned after serving for 17 years in the role. Sean Marcellus was appointed as interim commissioner.

Sean James of the Smiths Falls Bears received the league's most valuable player and scoring champion awards for the second year in a row.

=== Awards ===
- Most Valuable Player: Sean James (Smiths Falls Bears)
- Top Rookie: Luke Posthumus (Nepean Raiders)
- Outstanding Defenceman: Brandon Walker (Carleton Place Canadians)
- Sportsmanship/ability award: Matteo Disipio (Carleton Place Canadians)
- Top Prospect: Ty Campbell (Smiths Falls Bears)
- Outstanding graduating player: Sean James (Smiths Falls Bears)
- Arthur K. Nielsen scholarship award: Tyson Tomasini (Renfrew Wolves)
- Scoring champion: Sean James (Smiths Falls Bears)
- Top Goaltender: Sami Molu (Brockville Braves)
- Top Coach: Kyle Makaric (Ottawa Jr. Senators)
- Top General Manager: Pat Malloy (Smiths Falls Bears)

Source: "Season award archives". thecchl.ca.

== Regular season ==
The regular season ran from 21 September 2022 until 19 March 2023. Each team played 55 regular season games, facing each team 5 times. While teams were nominally assigned to either the Robinson division or the Yzerman division, the top 8 teams overall advanced to the playoffs regardless of their division assignment.

Standings
| Rank | Team | GP | W | L | OTL | SOL | GF | GA | Pts |
|---|---|---|---|---|---|---|---|---|---|
| 1 | Ottawa Jr. Senators | 55 | 42 | 8 | 3 | 2 | 218 | 126 | 89 |
| 2 | Navan Grads | 55 | 38 | 12 | 4 | 1 | 213 | 150 | 81 |
| 3 | Smiths Falls Bears | 55 | 37 | 15 | 1 | 2 | 232 | 165 | 77 |
| 4 | Hawkesbury Hawks | 55 | 30 | 18 | 4 | 3 | 188 | 172 | 67 |
| 5 | Renfrew Wolves | 55 | 30 | 18 | 4 | 3 | 184 | 177 | 67 |
| 6 | Carleton Place Canadians | 55 | 31 | 20 | 2 | 2 | 210 | 183 | 66 |
| 7 | Brockville Braves | 55 | 29 | 18 | 4 | 4 | 166 | 154 | 66 |
| 8 | Cornwall Colts | 55 | 26 | 24 | 3 | 2 | 175 | 181 | 57 |
| 9 | Kemptville 73's | 55 | 25 | 24 | 5 | 1 | 199 | 206 | 56 |
| 10 | Rockland Nationals | 55 | 20 | 23 | 4 | 8 | 172 | 203 | 52 |
| 11 | Nepean Raiders | 55 | 12 | 39 | 1 | 3 | 138 | 262 | 28 |
| 12 | Pembroke Lumber Kings | 55 | 10 | 40 | 2 | 3 | 132 | 248 | 25 |

Source: "2022–23 Central CCHL standings". hockeydb.com.

== Post-season ==
2023 League championship
Bogart Cup

Tournament details
- Dates: 22 March – 5 May
- Teams: 8
- Defending champions: Ottawa Jr. Senators

Final positions
- Champions: Ottawa Jr. Senators
- Runners-up: Smiths Falls Bears

Tournament statistics
- Games played: 39
- Goals scored: 213 (5.46 per game)
- Attendance: 15,408 (395 per game)

Awards
- Playoff MVP: Rorke Applebee

The Ottawa Jr. Senators won the league championship Bogart Cup for the fourth time in a row after defeating the Smiths Falls Bears in game 7 of the finals. The Jr. Senators thus advanced to the national championship tournament in Portage la Prairie, Manitoba

Quarterfinals
Ottawa | 4
Cornwall | 1
Brockville | 4
Navan | 3
Smiths Falls | 4
Carleton Place | 1
Hawkesbury | 1
Renfrew | 4

Semifinals
Ottawa | 4
Brockville | 1
Smiths Falls | 4
Renfrew | 1

Bogart Cup Finals
Ottawa | 4
Smiths Falls | 3

Source: "2022–23 CCHL playoff results". hockeydb.com.

=== Quarterfinal: Ottawa vs. Cornwall ===
Ottawa won the series, 4–1.

| Game | Date | Score | Location | Time | Attendance |
|---|---|---|---|---|---|
| 1 | March 22 | Cornwall 0, Ottawa 3 | Fred Barrett Arena | 2:11 | 161 |
| 2 | March 25 | Ottawa 5, Cornwall 2 | Cornwall Civic Complex | 2:13 | 1,211 |
| 3 | March 29 | Cornwall 4, Ottawa 3 (OT) | Fred Barrett Arena | 2:22 | 163 |
| 4 | April 1 | Ottawa 5, Cornwall 0 | Cornwall Civic Complex | 2:02 | 1,175 |
| 5 | April 3 | Cornwall 2, Ottawa 5 | Fred Barrett Arena | 2:07 | 208 |

Source: "2022–23 CCHL playoff results". hockeydb.com.

=== Quarterfinal: Brockville vs. Navan ===
Brockville won the series, 4–3.

| Game | Date | Score | Location | Time | Attendance |
|---|---|---|---|---|---|
| 1 | March 22 | Brockville 6, Navan 3 | Navan Memorial Centre | 2:12 | 176 |
| 2 | March 24 | Navan 1, Brockville 2 | Brockville Memorial Civic Centre | 2:14 | 693 |
| 3 | March 26 | Brockville 5, Navan 3 | Navan Memorial Centre | 2:22 | 249 |
| 4 | March 28 | Navan 2, Brockville 1 | Brockville Memorial Civic Centre | 2:07 | 657 |
| 5 | March 31 | Brockville 0, Navan 4 | Navan Memorial Centre | 2:11 | 257 |
| 6 | April 2 | Navan 3, Brockville 2 (OT) | Brockville Memorial Civic Centre | 3:14 | 548 |
| 7 | April 6 | Brockville 3, Navan 1 | Navan Memorial Centre | 2:31 | 624 |

Source: "2022–23 CCHL playoff results". hockeydb.com.

=== Quarterfinal: Smiths Falls vs. Carleton Place ===
Smiths Falls won the series, 4–1.

| Game | Date | Score | Location | Time | Attendance |
|---|---|---|---|---|---|
| 1 | March 24 | Carleton Place 1, Smiths Falls 5 | Smiths Falls Memorial Community Centre | 2:12 | 620 |
| 2 | March 26 | Smiths Falls 2, Carleton Place 4 | Carleton Place Arena | 2:29 | 406 |
| 3 | March 28 | Carleton Place 0, Smiths Falls 3 | Smiths Falls Memorial Community Centre | 2:10 | 461 |
| 4 | March 29 | Smiths Falls 3, Carleton Place 0 | Carleton Place Arena | 2:15 | 412 |
| 5 | March 31 | Carleton Place 4, Smiths Falls 5 | Smiths Falls Memorial Community Centre | 2:05 | 735 |

Source: "2022–23 CCHL playoff results". hockeydb.com.

=== Quarterfinal: Hawkesbury vs. Renfrew ===
Renfrew won the series, 4–1.

| Game | Date | Score | Location | Time | Attendance |
|---|---|---|---|---|---|
| 1 | March 24 | Renfrew 4, Hawkesbury 1 | Robert Hartley Sports Complex | 2:10 | 531 |
| 2 | March 26 | Hawkesbury 4, Renfrew 1 | MyFM Centre Recreation Complex | 2:10 | 412 |
| 3 | March 28 | Hawkesbury 2, Renfrew 4 | MyFM Centre Recreation Complex | 2:10 | 322 |
| 4 | March 30 | Renfrew 2, Hawkesbury 1 | Robert Hartley Sports Complex | 2:13 | 447 |
| 5 | March 31 | Renfrew 3, Hawkesbury 2 (OT) | Robert Hartley Sports Complex | 2:53 | 615 |

Source: "2022–23 CCHL playoff results". hockeydb.com.

=== Semifinal: Ottawa vs. Brockville ===
Ottawa won the series, 4–1.

| Game | Date | Score | Location | Time | Attendance |
|---|---|---|---|---|---|
| 1 | April 7 | Cornwall 0, Ottawa 4 | Fred Barrett Arena | 2:15 | 184 |
| 2 | April 10 | Ottawa 0, Brockville 3 | Brockville Memorial Civic Centre | 2:05 | 533 |
| 3 | April 12 | Brockville 1, Ottawa 3 | Fred Barrett Arena | 2:14 | 162 |
| 4 | April 13 | Ottawa 4, Brockville 3 (OT) | Brockville Memorial Civic Centre | 2:37 | 398 |
| 5 | April 15 | Brockville 2, Ottawa 3 | Fred Barrett Arena | 2:07 | 208 |

Source: "2022–23 CCHL playoff results". hockeydb.com.

=== Semifinal: Smiths Falls vs. Renfrew ===
Smiths Falls won the series, 4–1.

| Game | Date | Score | Location | Time | Attendance |
|---|---|---|---|---|---|
| 1 | April 8 | Renfrew 2, Smiths Falls 6 | Smiths Falls Memorial Community Centre | 2:12 | 415 |
| 2 | April 9 | Smiths Falls 3, Renfrew 2 | MyFM Centre Recreation Complex | 2:13 | 404 |
| 3 | April 11 | Renfrew 4, Smiths Falls 0 | Smiths Falls Memorial Community Centre | 2:13 | 480 |
| 4 | April 13 | Smiths Falls 2, Renfrew 1 | MyFM Centre Recreation Complex | 2:05 | 482 |
| 5 | April 14 | Renfrew 0, Smiths Falls 8 | Smiths Falls Memorial Community Centre | 2:01 | 575 |

Source: "2022–23 CCHL playoff results". hockeydb.com.

=== Bogart Cup Final: Ottawa vs. Smiths Falls ===
Ottawa won the series, 4–3.

| Game | Date | Score | Location | Time | Attendance |
|---|---|---|---|---|---|
| 1 | April 22 | Smiths Falls 5, Ottawa 2 | Fred Barrett Arena | 2:05 | 264 |
| 2 | April 23 | Ottawa 0, Smiths Falls 1 (OT) | Smiths Falls Memorial Community Centre | 2:21 | 680 |
| 3 | April 25 | Smiths Falls 1, Ottawa 7 | Fred Barrett Arena | 2:15 | 183 |
| 4 | April 28 | Ottawa 4, Smiths Falls 2 | Smiths Falls Memorial Community Centre | 2:22 | 1,045 |
| 5 | April 29 | Smiths Falls 4, Ottawa 7 | Fred Barrett Arena | 2:15 | 248 |
| 6 | May 2 | Ottawa 2, Smiths Falls 3 | Smiths Falls Memorial Community Centre | 2:20 | 706 |
| 7 | May 5 | Smiths Falls 2, Ottawa 6 | Fred Barrett Arena | 2:08 | 275 |

Source: "2022–23 CCHL playoff results". hockeydb.com.

== National championship ==
2023 National championship
Centennial Cup
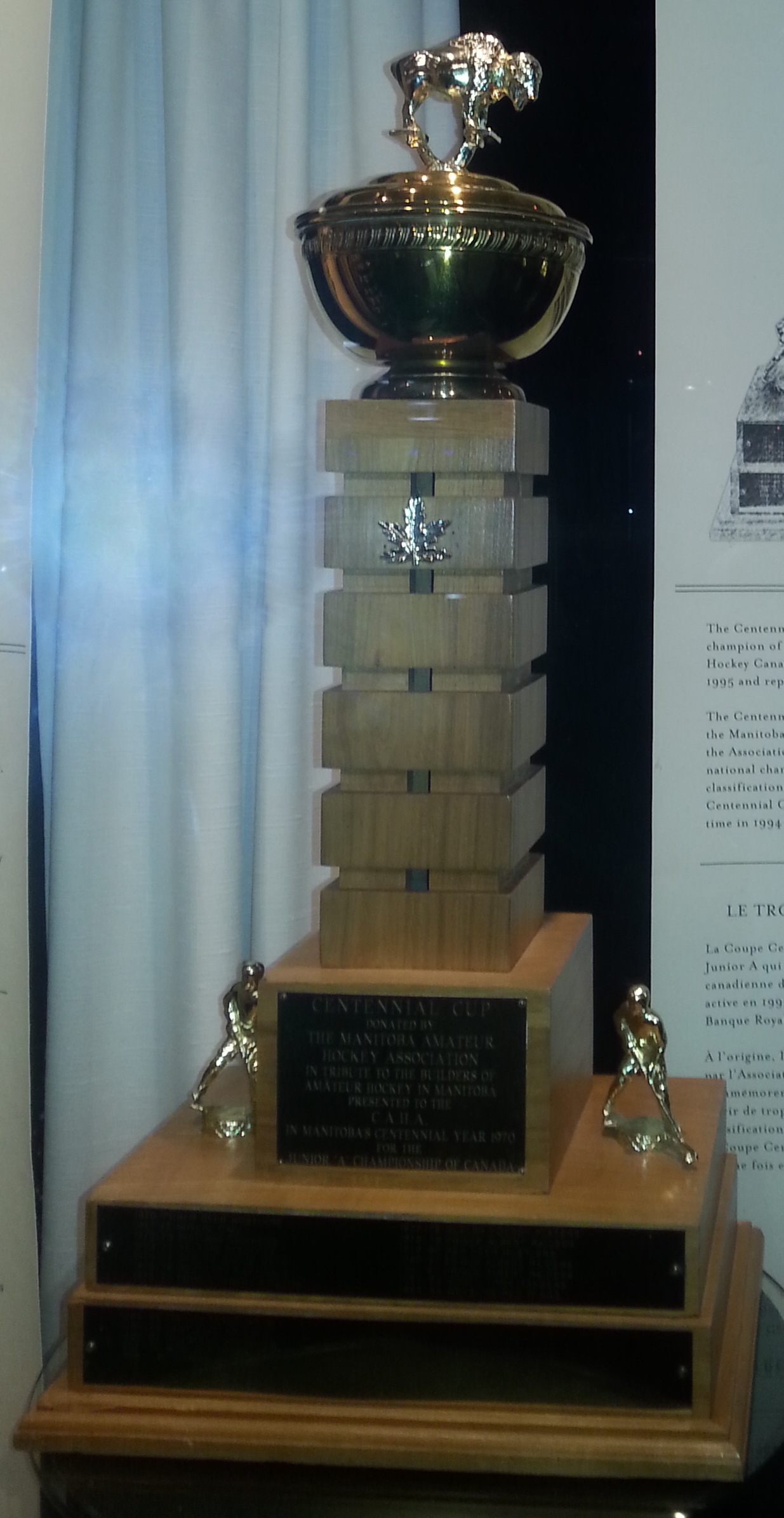

Tournament details
- City: Portage la Prairie
- Venue: Stride Place
- Dates: 11-21 May 2023
- Teams: 10
- Host team: Portage Terriers

Final positions
- Champions: Brooks Bandits
- Runners-up: Battlefords North Stars

Tournament statistics
- Games played: 25

Awards
- MVP: Aiden Fink

Official website
- Hockey Canada

The 2023 Centennial Cup tournament was hosted by the Portage Terriers of the MJHL in Portage la Prairie, Manitoba. Following the precedent set at the 2022 Centennial Cup, the tournament consisted of a 4-game round-robin with two groups of five teams, followed by a six-team single-elimination play-off.

=== Round-robin ===
The top 3 teams from each group advanced to the playoffs, and the 1st place teams in each group had a bye to the semifinals.

| | Group A | BB | OJS | YM | CT | TR |
| 1 | Brooks Bandits | | 5-1 | 7-2 | 6-1 | 9-0 |
| 2 | Ottawa Jr. Senators | 1-5 | | 4-3 | 2-1 | 1-2 |
| 3 | Yarmouth Mariners | 2-7 | 3-4 | | 3-2 | 3-4 |
| 4 | Cobras de Terrebonne | 1-6 | 1-2 | 2-3 | | 2-1 |
| 5 | Timmins Rock | 0-9 | 2-1 | 4-3 | 1-2 | |

| | Group B | BNS | PT | CB | SP | KFW |
| 1 | Battlefords North Stars | | 3-2 | 1-3 | 3-1 | 4-1 |
| 2 | Portage Terriers | 2-3 | | 4-3 | 4-2 | 12-2 |
| 3 | Collingwood Blues | 3-1 | 3-4 | | 2-1 | 4-1 |
| 4 | Steinbach Pistons | 1-3 | 2-4 | 1-2 | | 5-2 |
| 5 | Kam River Fighting Walleye | 1-4 | 2-12 | 1-4 | 2-5 | |

=== Playoffs ===
The Ottawa Jr. Senators reached the semifinals and were eliminated from competition by the defending championship Brooks Bandits of the AJHL. The Bandits went on to win their third straight national championship after defeating the Battlefords North Stars of the SJHL in four games in the finals.

Quarterfinals
Ottawa Jr. Senators | 4
Collingwood Blues | 2
Portage Terriers | 2
Yarmouth Mariners | 1

Semifinals
Ottawa Jr. Senators | 0
Brooks Bandits | 3
Battlefords North Stars | 7
Portage Terriers | 1

Finals
Brooks Bandits | 4
Battlefords North Stars | 0

== Sources ==
- Sawatzky, Mike (19 June 2023). "Portage la Prairie earns praise for hosting 'best' Centennial Cup ever". Winnipeg Free Press.
- "Sean Marcellus appointed as CCHL interim commissioner". cjhlhockey.com. 14 May 2023.
- "Sean Marcellus Has Resigned as Interim Commissioner". thecchl.ca (Press release). 19 April 2024.
- "Smiths Falls forces game seven of CCHL finals with Ottawa". recorder.ca. Postmedia. 3 May 2023.
- "Road to the 2023 Centennial Cup: Ottawa Jr. Senators". hockeycanada.ca.
