= 2021–22 CCHL season =

61st season of the CCHL

- League: Central Canada Hockey League
- Sport: Ice hockey
- Duration: Regular season September–April
- Games: 55
- Teams: 12
- Total attendance: 66,702

League championship
- Bogart Cup: Ottawa Jr. Senators
- Runners-up: Hawkesbury Hawks

CCHL seasons
- ← 2020–21 2022–23 →

The 2021–22 CCHL season was the 61st season of the Central Canada Hockey League (CCHL).

== Season highlights ==
The Renfrew Wolves debuted and made the playoffs in their inaugural season. The team formed from the sale and relocation of the Kanata Lasers in the 2020 off-season. Their debut was postponed due to the COVID-19 pandemic.

An increase in COVID-19 cases in Ontario forced the league to temporarily shutdown for about 4 weeks after the Christmas break.

The national championship Centennial Cup tournament returned after a two-year hiatus brought on by the COVID-19 pandemic. The format was modified from the traditional 5-team format to a 10-team format, including the championship teams from each of the 9 leagues that make up the CJHL, and the host team. This eliminated the intervening regional Eastern Canada championship Fred Page Cup tournament. Under the new format, the tournament consisted of a 4-game round-robin with two groups of five teams, followed by a six-team single-elimination play-off.

=== Awards ===
- Most Valuable Player: Sean James (Smiths Falls Bears)
- Top Rookie: Keanu Krenn (Cornwall Colts)
- Outstanding Defenceman: Mark Cooper (Hawkesbury Hawks)
- Sportsmanship/ability award: Rylee Hlusiak (Hawkesbury Hawks)
- Top Prospect: Ty Campbell (Smiths Falls Bears)
- Outstanding graduating player: Mark Cooper (Hawkesbury Hawks)
- Arthur K. Nielsen scholarship award: Thomas Freel (Ottawa Jr. Senators)
- Scoring champion: Sean James (Smiths Falls Bears)
- Top Goaltender: Reece Proulx (Pembroke Lumber Kings)
- Top Coach: Rick Dorval (Hawkesbury Hawks)
- Top General Manager: Rick Dorval (Hawkesbury Hawks)

Source: "Season award archives". thecchl.ca.

== Regular season ==
Teams played 55 regular season games, with the top 8 teams overall advancing to the post-season. An increase in COVID-19 cases in Ontario during the Christmas break forced the league to temporarily shutdown for about 4 weeks in January.

Robinson division
Team	Centre	GP	W	L	OTL	SOL	GF	GA	Pts
Brockville Braves	Brockville, Ontario	55	36	17	0	2	198	155	74
Renfrew Wolves	Renfrew, Ontario	55	35	17	1	2	207	151	73
Kemptville 73's	Kemptville, Ontario	55	29	18	5	3	198	171	66
Pembroke Lumber Kings	Pembroke, Ontario	55	30	21	2	2	167	159	64
Smiths Falls Bears	Smiths Falls, Ontario	55	25	25	4	1	193	215	55
Carleton Place Canadians	Carleton Place, Ontario	55	18	32	2	3	166	216	41

Source: "2021–22 Central CCHL standings". hockeydb.com.

Yzerman division
Team	Centre	GP	W	L	OTL	SOL	GF	GA	Pts
Ottawa Jr. Senators	Ottawa, Ontario	55	43	8	2	2	225	132	90
Hawkesbury Hawks	Hawkesbury, Ontario	55	37	13	3	2	205	131	79
Navan Grads	Navan, Ontario	55	27	24	2	2	206	194	58
Rockland Nationals	Rockland, Ontario	55	24	24	4	3	166	188	55
Cornwall Colts	Cornwall, Ontario	55	14	33	3	5	135	210	36
Nepean Raiders	Nepean, Ontario	55	12	41	2	0	159	303	26

Source: "2021–22 Central CCHL standings". hockeydb.com.

== Post-season ==
2022 League championship
Bogart Cup

Tournament details
- Dates: 12 April – 10 May
- Teams: 8
- Defending champions: Ottawa Jr. Senators

Final positions
- Champions: Ottawa Jr. Senators
- Runners-up: Hawkesbury Hawks

Tournament statistics
- Games played: 38
- Goals scored: 223 (5.87 per game)
- Attendance: 16,348 (430 per game)

The Ottawa Jr. Senators swept the Hawkesbury Hawks in the final round to win the league championship Bogart Cup and advance to the 2022 Centennial Cup national championship tournament in Estevan, Saskatchewan.

Quarterfinals
Ottawa	4
Smiths Falls	0
Renfrew	4
Kemptville	2
Brockville	4
Pembroke	3
Hawkesbury	4
Navan	2

Semifinals
Ottawa	4
Renfrew	1
Brockville	1
Hawkesbury	4

Bogart Cup Finals
Ottawa	4
Hawkesbury	0

Source: "2021–22 CCHL playoff results". hockeydb.com.

== National championship ==
In 2022, the Centennial Cup moved to a 10-team format, including the champions from each of the 9 leagues that make up the CJHL, and the host team, thus eliminating the intervening regional contests for the ANAVET Cup, the Fred Page Cup and the Doyle Cup. Since the SJHL championship Estevan Bruins already had a guaranteed berth as the host team, the qualifying berth for the SJHL champions was awarded to the second place Flin Flon Bombers. The tournament consisted of a 4-game round-robin with two groups of five teams, followed by a six-team single-elimination play-off. The Ottawa Jr. Senators represented the CCHL and were eliminated from competition after losing 3 of their 4 games in the preliminary round. The Brooks Bandits of the AJHL defeated the Pickering Panthers of the OJHL in the final match to win the tournament.

== See also ==
- 2022 Centennial Cup
- COVID-19 pandemic in Ontario
- Timeline of the COVID-19 pandemic in Ontario (2021)
- Timeline of the COVID-19 pandemic in Ontario (2022)

== Sources ==
- "Season award archives". thecchl.ca.
- "2021–22 Central CCHL standings". hockeydb.com.
- "Ottawa Junior Senators Crowned 2021–22 Bogart Cup Champions". thecchl.ca. 11 May 2022.
- Mahon, Rob (18 May 2021). "Estevan Bruins To Remain Host For 2022 Centennial Cup". discoverestevan.com.
- Willberg, David (22 March 2022). "The 2022 Centennial Cup in Estevan will be the biggest ever with 10 teams". sasktoday.ca. Harvard Media.
- "Changes coming to this year's Centennial Cup in Saskatchewan". battlefordsnow.com. Pattison Media. 30 March 2022.
- Willberg, David (16 May 2022). "The field is set for the Centennial Cup in Estevan". sasktoday.ca. Harvard Media. "The top three teams from each pool will advance to the playoff round. The top seed gets a direct bye to the semifinal, while the second and third place teams move onto the quarter-finals."
- "Road to the 2022 Centennial Cup: Ottawa Jr. Senators". hockeycanada.ca.
- Cleary, Martin (30 June 2023). "HIGH ACHIEVERS: COVID forced Sean James on long road to Mercyhurst U, but led him to discover he wants to be a teacher". OttawaSportsPages.ca.
