= Todd Flichel =

Canadian ice hockey player (born 1964)

- Born: September 16, 1964 (age 61) Osgoode, Ontario, Canada
- Height: 6 ft 3 in (191 cm)
- Weight: 195 lb (88 kg; 13 st 13 lb)
- Position: Defence
- Shot: Right
- Played for: Winnipeg Jets
- NHL draft: 169th overall, 1983; Winnipeg Jets
- Playing career: 1987–1994

Todd A. Flichel (born September 14, 1964) is a Canadian retired ice hockey defenceman. He played 6 games in the National Hockey League for the Winnipeg Jets between 1987 and 1990. The rest of his career, which lasted from 1988 to 1994, was spent in the minor American Hockey League and International Hockey League

== Career statistics ==
=== Regular season and playoffs ===
			Regular season					Playoffs
Season	Team	League	GP	G	A	Pts	PIM	GP	G	A	Pts	PIM
1981–82	Gloucester Rangers	CJHL	43	1	6	7	66	—	—	—	—	—
1982–83	Gloucester Rangers	CJHL	44	2	21	23	118	—	—	—	—	—
1983–84	Bowling Green State University	CCHA	44	1	3	4	12	—	—	—	—	—
1984–85	Bowling Green State University	CCHA	42	5	7	12	62	—	—	—	—	—
1985–86	Bowling Green State University	CCHA	42	3	10	13	84	—	—	—	—	—
1986–87	Bowling Green State University	CCHA	42	4	15	19	77	—	—	—	—	—
1987–88	Winnipeg Jets	NHL	2	0	0	0	2	—	—	—	—	—
1987–88	Moncton Hawks	AHL	65	5	12	17	102	—	—	—	—	—
1988–89	Winnipeg Jets	NHL	1	0	0	0	0	—	—	—	—	—
1988–89	Moncton Hawks	AHL	74	2	29	31	81	10	1	4	5	25
1989–90	Winnipeg Jets	NHL	3	0	1	1	2	—	—	—	—	—
1989–90	Moncton Hawks	AHL	65	7	14	21	74	—	—	—	—	—
1990–91	Moncton Hawks	AHL	75	8	21	29	44	9	0	0	0	8
1991–92	Fort Wayne Komets	IHL	64	3	10	13	79	7	0	0	0	2
1992–93	Cincinnati Cyclones	IHL	52	5	10	15	46	—	—	—	—	—
1992–93	Rochester Americans	AHL	15	1	3	4	4	16	2	4	6	22
1993–94	Rochester Americans	AHL	2	0	0	0	0	—	—	—	—	—
AHL totals			296	23	79	102	305	35	3	8	11	55
NHL totals			6	0	1	1	4	—	—	—	—	—
