= Hawkesbury Hawks =

Junior ice hockey club

- City: Hawkesbury, Ontario
- League: CCHL
- Division: East
- Founded: 1974
- Home arena: Robert Hartley Sports Complex
- Colours
- Owner: Sylvain Landers
- General manager: Marc Berniqué
- Head coach: Marc Berniqué
- Media: FloSports
- Website: hawkesburyhawks.com

Championships
- League: 1979; 1980; 1990; 1991; 1999; 2005; 2006
- Regional: 2005

The Hawkesbury Hawks Junior A Hockey Club is a junior ice hockey club and franchise of the Central Canada Hockey League (CCHL). The team plays its home games at the Robert Hartley Sports Complex in Hawkesbury, Ontario.

== History ==
The Hawks were formed by a group of local businessmen in March 1974. From 1974 until 1976 the Hawks were a part of the Eastern Ontario Junior B Hockey League. After making the jump to the Central Junior A Hockey League in 1976, the Hawks found themselves in the basement of the league in their first season—although they quickly rose through the ranks in the seasons following. In 1979, the team won the CJHL Championship and moved on to the Centennial Cup where they lost the semi-finals to the Ontario Hockey Association's Guelph Platers—the eventual champion. The 1980 season saw them win the Bogart Cup as CJHL Champions again. This time they lost in the quarter-finals of the National Championship to Quebec Junior AAA Hockey League Champion Joliette Cyclones.

1990 saw the Hawks rise to glory once again as CJHL Champions, but an opening round loss in the national Championships to Quebec's Le Collège Français de Longueuil spelled the end of a National Championship run. In 1991, the team won the league again and then also hosted the Central Canadian Championship where they lost the semi-final to the Sudbury Junior Wolves of the Northern Ontario Junior Hockey League.

1998-99 was a big year for the Hawkesbury Hawks as they won their first CJHL championship since 1991 by defeating the defending Art Bogart Cup and Fred Page Cup champions Brockville Braves in 6 games. Their trip to the Royal Bank Cup in Yorkton would be cut short as they were defeated by the hosts Charlottetown Abbies 2-0 in the Fred Page Cup final.

The Hawkesbury Hawks would go from not winning a quarter-final series from 2000 to 2004, until the 2004-05 season came as a surprise as they managed to defeat the Gloucester Rangers in 7 games, despite leading 3-0 and the Rangers coming back to force game 7. They would also defeat the second-heavily favored Cornwall in 6 games, and make the league finals against Nepean. Ironically, this series went to game 7 where the Hawks won 6-1 (they broke a league record for the most goals in a short time). Hawkesbury clinched their first Art Bogart Cup since 1999. At the Fred Page Cup, it wasn't the exact measure of revenge as the Hawks defeated the hosts Yarmouth Mariners 4-3 in the final, but it was still a trip earned to the Royal Bank Cup in Weyburn, Saskatchewan. The Hawks lost their best player and captain Martin Beaulne, who ruptured his spleen. On the way home to Hawkesbury, the team turned around and went to the hospital in Fredericton, New Brunswick because Beaulne was in pain and needed medical attention. The Hawks traveled without their captain able to play in the tournament, and the Hawks, who were needing a win against Portage to earn a berth in the quarter-finals, got the win in overtime. However, it was the Weyburn Red Wings they were facing. The Hawks tied the game seconds left in regulation, and lost the game in overtime sending the eventual Royal Bank Cup champions to the final.

With plenty of returning players, the Hawkesbury Hawks lost their coach Éric Veilleux (who became head coach in 2002-03) took a job with the Shawinigan Cataractes of the QMJHL. This left the Hawks finding a replacement in Jeff Carter, who managed to lead the Hawks back to the league finals and win back-to-back CCHL champions, this time against the Nepean Raiders. However, their venture at the Fred Page Cup in Pembroke ended in the semi-finals after losing to the Joliette Action.

The Hawks fell apart as players, who played in the championship years graduated. The Hawks hit rock-bottom in the standings with only eight wins in 2008–09. Several players demanded trades, walked off the team or went elsewhere to resume their Junior A hockey careers.

The 2009–10 season saw the Hawks go under new ownership, management and coaching staff. The Hawks brought in rookie coach Martin Dagenais, who also served as the acting general manager. Richard Morris stepped in as assistant coach., while Ian Henderson was brought on to the staff as assistant general manager and the director of player personnel. An entire new scouting staff was added as part of the new groups rebuilding plan for the franchise. By December, the Hawks had already matched the win total from the previous season with one of the youngest teams in the CJHL.

After back to back disappointing seasons 2012-2014 the Hawks needed a change. Owner Sylvain Landers made a dramatic move and brought in Head coach Rick Dorval. Dorval brought with him a successful track record of turning around struggling franchises with the Gloucester Rangers and the Ottawa Junior Senators achieving Coach of the Year in 2012-2013. In the 2014-2015 season the Hawks went from last in the league standings to fifth overall. With a rebuilt team in 2015-2016 the Hawks continued to move forward finishing third overall with only three points separating them from first place.

For the 2015-16 CCHL season, the Hawks dropped their original colors of blue, gold, red and white and adopted the same colors of the Vancouver Canucks of the National Hockey League, consisting of blue, green and white.

Statistics
Season	GP	W	L	T	OTL	SOL	GF	GA	Pts	Regular season	Post-season
1976–77	50	9	35	6	0	0	214	368	24	6th overall	Did not qualify
1977–78	48	13	30	5	0	0	212	284	31	4th overall	Lost semifinal
1978–79	48	24	19	5	0	0	257	218	53	2nd overall	Won final
1979–80	50	39	8	3	0	0	350	191	81	1st overall	Won final
1980–81	50	28	15	7	0	0	244	186	63	3rd overall	Lost semifinal
1981–82	50	28	20	2	0	0	259	243	58	3rd overall	Lost semifinal
1982–83	48	22	24	2	0	0	194	227	46	4th overall	Lost semifinal
1983–84	54	24	23	7	0	0	253	265	55	5th overall	Lost semifinal
1984–85	54	36	17	0	1	0	296	216	73	3rd overall	Lost semifinal
1985–86	60	13	44	1	2	0	195	372	29	6th overall	Lost quarterfinal
1986–87	54	18	30	4	2	0	217	295	42	6th overall	Lost quarterfinal
1987–88	56	9	47	0	0	0	190	382	18	7th overall	Lost quarterfinal
1988–89	56	35	19	1	1	0	306	258	72	3rd overall	Lost semifinal
1989–90	56	40	14	1	1	0	343	243	82	1st overall	Won final
1990–91	56	42	7	4	3	0	327	152	91	1st overall	Won final
1991–92	57	38	14	1	4	0	316	242	81	4th overall	Lost quarterfinal
1992–93	57	31	21	5	0	0	318	277	67	6th overall	Lost quarterfinal
1993–94	57	16	33	3	5	0	226	293	40	9th overall	Lost quarterfinal
1994–95	54	27	22	2	3	0	257	242	59	5th overall	Lost semifinal
1995–96	54	27	22	5	0	0	242	246	59	4th in division	Lost quarterfinal
1996–97	53	9	38	6	0	0	156	274	24	5th in division	Did not qualify
1997–98	56	21	20	8	7	0	204	227	57	3rd in division	Lost quarterfinal
1998–99	54	40	11	3	0	0	299	172	83	1st in division	Won final
1999–00	56	29	24	3	0	0	247	237	61	3rd in division	Lost quarterfinal
2000–01	55	14	29	12	0	0	190	283	42	3rd in division	Lost quarterfinal
2001–02	55	16	30	9	0	0	187	226	42	4th in division	Lost quarterfinal
2002–03	55	26	19	10	0	0	223	218	64	4th in division	Lost quarterfinal
2003–04	55	25	20	6	4	0	198	179	60	4th in division	Lost quarterfinal
2004–05	55	27	18	3	7	0	221	182	64	2nd in division	Won final Won Fred Page Cup
2005–06	57	30	19	6	2	0	221	202	68	1st in division	Won final
2006–07	55	25	23	6	1	0	196	197	57	3rd in division	Lost semifinal
2007–08	60	30	27	3	0	0	232	214	63	3rd in division	Lost semifinal
2008–09	60	8	47	0	2	3	140	300	21	11th overall	Did not qualify
2009–10	62	12	48	0	1	1	137	338	26	12th overall	Did not qualify
2010–11	62	11	46	0	3	2	154	293	27	12th overall	Did not qualify
2011–12	62	35	20	0	3	4	214	177	77	5th overall	Lost semifinal
2012–13	62	29	26	0	2	5	176	183	65	8th overall	Lost quarterfinal
2013–14	62	18	39	0	4	1	149	248	41	12th overall	Did not qualify
2014–15	62	35	25	0	2	0	217	192	72	3rd in division 5th overall	Lost quarterfinal against Cornwall (4:2)
2015–16	62	40	16	0	1	5	224	170	86	2nd in division 3rd overall	Won quarterfinal against Smiths Falls (4:0); Lost semifinal against Ottawa (4:2)
2016–17	62	36	24	0	0	2	205	185	74	3rd in division 4th overall	Lost quarterfinal against Kemptville (4:2)
2017–18	62	36	23	0	0	3	200	176	75	2nd in division 4th overall	Won quarterfinal against Cornwall (4:3); Lost semifinal against Carleton Place (4:0)
2018–19	62	37	19	0	4	2	190	169	80	3rd in division 4th overall	Lost quarterfinal against Rockland (4:1)
2019–20	62	36	24	0	2	0	220	182	74	2nd in division 4th overall	Playoffs cancelled
2020–21	Season cancelled										
2021–22	55	37	13	0	3	2	205	131	79	2nd in division 2nd overall	Won quarterfinal against Navan (4:2); Won semifinal against Brockville (4:1); Lost final against Ottawa (4:0)
2022–23	55	30	18	0	4	3	188	172	67	3rd in division 4th overall	Lost quarterfinal against Renfrew (4:1)
2023–24	55	27	22	0	3	3	179	179	60	4th in division 6th overall	Lost quarterfinal against Cornwall (4:1)
2024–25	55	24	24	0	4	3	195	204	55	4th in division 9th overall	Did not qualify
2025–26	55	19	30	0	4	2	179	229	44	5th in division 10th overall	Did not qualify

Source: "Hawkesbury Hawks statistics and history". hockeydb.com.

== Regional championships ==
Year	Round Robin	Record	Standing	Semifinal	Final
1999	L, Charlottetown Abbies 6:3; W, Antogonish 6:4; L, Valleyfield Braves 3:2	1-2-0	3rd of 4	OTW, Valleyfield Braves 6-5	L, Charlottetown Abbies 2:0
2005	L, Yarmouth Mariners 2:1; W, Truro Bearcats 2:1; W, Vaudreuil Mustangs 3:2	2-1-0	2nd of 4	W, Vaudreuil Mustangs 5:4	W, Yarmouth Mariners 4:3
2006	W, Woodstock Slammers 3:0; 2OTL, Joliette Action 7:6; L, Pembroke Lumber Kings 5:1	1-2-0	3rd of 4	L, Joliette Action 4-6	Did not qualify

== National championships ==
Year	Round Robin	Record	Standing	Semifinal	Final
2005	L, Camrose Kodiaks 3:2; L, Georgetown Raiders 3:0; OTL, Weyburn Red Wings 4:3; 2OTW, Portage Terriers 5:4	3:1	4th of 5	L, Weyburn Red Wings 4:3	Did not qualify

== Notable alumni ==
- Derek Armstrong
- Jesse Boulerice
- Jeff Brown
- Bruce Cassidy
- Jim Culhane
- Jim Kyte
- Denis Larocque
- Marquis Mathieu
- Sandy McCarthy
- Dan McGillis
- Ken McRae
- Gino Odjick
- Benoit Pouliot
- Bruce Racine
- Mike Rowe
- Martin St. Louis
- Martin St. Pierre

== Sources ==
- "History". hawkesburyhawks.com. Hawkesbury Hawks.
- "Team East - Hawksbury Hawks". hockeycanada.ca. Hockey Canada.
- "Dorval Becomes Hawkesbury All-Time Wins Leader". thecchl.ca. Hawkesbury, ON: Central Canada Hockey League. 14 October 2017.
- Masson, Reid (21 September 2020). "Hawkesbury Hawks set for potential October 1 start to CCHL Junior 'A' pre-season games". The Review.
- Hill, Vankleek (23 February 2022). "Former Hawkesbury Hawk wins Olympic Gold as head coach of Canadian women's hockey team". The Review.
- Hill, Vankleek (21 June 2022). "Former Hawk Bruce Cassidy named head coach of Las Vegas Golden Knights". The Review.
- Masson, Reid (19 September 2022). "Change is the word, as Hawkesbury Hawks kick off CCHL season at home this weekend". The Review.
- Weller, Emma (20 December 2024). "Local hockey team to face off against Kazakhstan in pre-tournament World Junior game". CBC News. CBC/Radio-Canada.
