= Navan Grads =

Junior ice hockey club

- City: Ottawa
- Division: Yzerman
- Founded: 1974
- Home arena: Navan Memorial Centre
- Colours
- General manager: Marty Abrams
- Head coach: Sean Blunden
- Media: FloSports
- Website: navangrads.com

Franchise history
- 1973–1974: Rockland Boomers
- 1974–1989: Navan Grads
- 1989–2017: Cumberrland Grads
- Since 2017: Navan Grads

Championships
- League: 2024
- National: 2024

The Navan Grads Hockey Club is a junior ice hockey club and franchise of the Central Canada Hockey League (CCHL). The team plays its home games at the Navan Memorial Arena in Ottawa. based in Ottawa.

== History ==
The club was founded as the Rockland Boomers for the 1973–74 season, and rebranded to the Navan Grads after one season. The residents of Navan renamed the franchise to the Grads after buying it in 1974. The team played home games at the Navan Memorial Centre for its first 15 seasons before moving to the R.J. Kennedy Community Centre. Since 2017, the Grads play at the Navan Memorial Centre.

In the summer of 1974, the residents of Navan banded together and purchased the rights of the Eastern Ontario Junior Hockey League's Rockland Boomers. They moved them to Navan, and the Grads were born. In 1989, the board of directors for the Navan Grads felt that the region of Cumberland would be better suited with a team that reflected the region. The team's name from then on was the Cumberland Grads from 1989 to 2017.

In the summer of 1991, the Grads became the 10th team in the Central Canada Hockey League. The Grads won their first-ever playoff series against the Kanata Stallions defeating them 4 games to 0. The Ottawa Jr. Senators upset the Grads 4 games to 2 in the semi-finals, when game 6 went to triple overtime and Ottawa scored the game-winning goal on a penalty shot in the third overtime period.

In 2024, the Navan Grads made it to the playoffs, and have won their first Bogart Cup in history against the Smiths Falls Bears in five games.

== Season-by-season record ==
Note: GP = Games Played, W = Wins, L = Losses, T = Ties, OTL = Overtime Losses, GF = Goals for, GA = Goals against

Season	GP	W	L	T	OTL	GF	GA	Points	Finish	Playoffs
1981-82	35	16	17	2	-	228	221	34	4th EO-NWest	
1982-83	36	16	16	4	-	197	201	36	3rd EO-AEng	
1983-85	Statistics Not Available									
1985-86	35	27	8	0	-	251	149	54	2nd EO-AEng	
1986-87	40	18	17	5	-	212	201	41	2nd EO-Metro	
1987-91	Statistics Not Available									
1991-92	57	15	39	1	2	217	344	33	8th CJHL	
1992-93	57	10	43	2	2	223	370	24	9th CJHL	
1993-94	57	10	45	1	1	235	419	22	10th CJHL	
1994-95	54	13	29	6	6	219	302	38	9th CJHL	
1995-96	54	22	30	2	-	234	272	46	8th CJHL	
1996-97	54	16	31	7	-	197	278	39	9th CJHL	
1997-98	56	19	20	13	4	203	239	55	8th CJHL	
1998-99	54	18	33	3	-	194	270	39	9th CJHL	
1999-00	56	22	27	7	-	214	261	51	9th CJHL	
2000-01	55	12	35	8	-	177	273	32	9th CJHL	
2001-02	55	23	26	5	1	230	242	52	6th CJHL	
2002-03	55	36	13	5	1	298	179	78	1st CJHL	Lost semi-final
2003-04	55	35	14	5	1	250	173	76	2nd CJHL	Lost quarter-final
2004-05	57	23	30	2	2	178	222	50	7th CJHL	
2005-06	57	23	29	5	0	183	214	51	4th in Yzerman	Lost quarter-final
2006-07	55	11	37	5	2	158	247	29	5th in Yzerman	DNQ
2007-08	60	34	20	3	3	221	182	74	4th CJHL	
2008-09	60	38	16	-	6	244	187	82	3rd CJHL	Lost quarter-final
2009-10	62	29	26	-	7	205	204	65	7th CJHL	Lost quarter-final
2010-11	62	21	34	-	7	179	252	49	11th CCHL	DNQ
2011-12	62	21	35	-	6	190	258	48	10th CCHL	DNQ
2012-13	62	18	38	-	6	189	275	42	11th CCHL	DNQ
2013-14	62	21	31	-	10	170	217	52	10th CCHL	DNQ
2014-15	62	15	43	2	2	139	271	34	5th of 6 Yzerman; 11th of 12 CCHL	DNQ
2015-16	62	36	19	5	2	258	185	79	2nd of 6 Yzerman; 5th of 10 CCHL	Lost quarterfinals, 0-4 (Braves)
2016-17	62	24	34	2	2	194	216	52	3rd of 6 Yzerman; 9thof 10 CCHL	Did not qualify for playoffs
2017-18	62	9	52	1	0	130	272	19	6th of 6 Yzerman; 12th of 12 CCHL	Did not qualify for playoffs
2018-19	62	25	28	6	3	168	191	59	4th of 6 Yzerman; 8th of 12 CCHL	Lost quarterfinals, 0-4 (Canadians)
2018-19	62	25	28	6	3	168	191	59	4th of 6 Yzerman; 8th of 12 CCHL	Lost quarterfinals, 0-4 (Canadians)
2019-20	62	29	32	1	0	168	191	59	4th in division 9th overall	Did not qualify
2020–21	Season cancelled									
2021–22	55	27	24	2	2	211	196	58	3rd in division 7th overall	Lost quarterfinal against Hawkesbury (4:2)
2022–23	55	38	12	4	1	213	150	81	2nd in division 2nd overall	Lost quarterfinal against Brockville (4:3)
2023–24	55	41	9	3	2	235	144	87	1st in division 1st overall	Won quarterfinal against Pembroke (4:3); Won semifinal against Rockland (4:1); Won final against Smiths Falls (4:2)
2024–25	55	32	16	3	4	230	186	71	2nd in division 3rd overall	Won quarterfinal against Brockville (4:3); Lost semifinal against Carleton Place (4:3)
2025–26	55	26	23	0	5	193	188	58	3rd in division 5th overall	Lost quarterfinal against Kemptville (4:1)

Source: "Navan Grads statistics and history". hockeydb.com.

== National championships ==
Year	Round-robin	Record	Standing	Quarterfinal	Semifinal	Championship
2024	W, Collège Français de Longueuil (QJHL), 5-1; W, Greater Sudbury Cubs (NOJHL), 5-1; OTL, Calgary Canucks (AJHL), 3-4; L, Collingwood Blues (OJHL), 2-3	2-0-1-1	3rd of 5 Group A	Lost 4-8; Miramichi Timberwolves	did not qualify	did not qualify

== Notable alumni ==
- Matt Bradley
- Claude Giroux
- Jon Matsumoto
- Daniel Taylor
- Jason Akeson
- Eric O'Dell

== Sources ==
- La Rose, Jason. "Road to the 2024 Centennial Cup: Navan Grads". Hockey Canada.
