= Jim Durrell Recreation Centre =

Multi-purpose arena facility in Ottawa, Canada

- Interactive map of Jim Durrell Recreation Centre
- Former names: Walkley Arena (1964–1984)
- Address: 1265 Walkley Road; Ottawa, Ontario; K1V 6P9
- Coordinates: 45.373096°N 75.658808°W
- Owner: City of Ottawa
- Operator: City of Ottawa
- Capacity: 2,000 (Jim Peplinski Arena); 200 (Walkley Arena)
- Record attendance: 1,131 (Game 6 of 2016 Bogart Cup Final)
- Field size: 200 feet (61 m) x 85 feet (26 m) (ice rinks)

Construction
- Groundbreaking: November 16, 1962
- Opened: 1964
- Renovated: 1984
- Cost: CA$217,200
- Architects: J.L. Richards and Associates
- General contractor: Abel Construction

Tenant
- Ottawa Jr. Senators (CCHL) (1984–present)

Jim Durrell Recreation Centre is a dual-pad arena complex in Ottawa, Ontario, Canada. It is located in the south end of the city on Walkley Road close to the intersection of Bank Street. The facility holds two NHL-sized rinks with one having 2,000 seats, and is the home of the Ottawa Jr. Senators of the Central Canada Hockey League (CCHL). It also features a community room for special events.

== History ==
The facility opened in 1964 as the single-pad Walkley Arena. It was the second City of Ottawa owned arena after the Elmgrove Park Arena in the west of the city. City council debated on whether to build two arenas but ultimately decided to start with the one on Walkley first and then build their third arena on a lot they owned at the intersections of Chamberlain and Lyon. Initial costs for the new arena were to be $170,000 but increased by $30,000 by November 1962 when work began. Strangely enough, the City saved somewhere between $5,000 to $15,000 by not installing showers in the four dressing rooms. The contract was awarded to Abel Construction, and the architectural firm was J.L. Richards and Associates. Several names were proposed for the new arena, among them were, Senator's Memorial Arena, Colonel By Arena and Billings Arena, the Silver Seven Stadium (to commemorate the Silver Seven hockey team which won the Stanley Cup in 1903, 1904 and 1905), but it was eventually decided to simply keep it as Walkley Arena.

In January 1984, 300 residents of Ottawa South presented the a petition to city planners requesting a new arena be built inside the building to help with the 2,000 hockey and ringette players and figure skaters. Brian Bourns considered a $2-to $3-million arena far too expensive and thought doubling Walkley Arena was the better solution. The complex officially changed its name to Jim Durrell Recreation Centre in 1984 when the Jim Peplinski Arena was built inside the building.

The Jim Peplinski Arena has been the home of the Ottawa Jr. Senators since 1984 and is the biggest among the two rinks. It contains 2,000 seats, while the Walkley Arena can only holds 200 people. The biggest crowd to ever see a game at the complex was on April 23, 2016 when 1,131 fans saw the Jr. Senators winning 7–0 against the Carleton Place Canadians during Game 6 of the 2016 Bogart Cup Final.

== See also ==
- Ottawa Jr. Senators
- Central Canada Hockey League
