= Renfrew Wolves =

Central Canada Hockey League team in Ontario, Canada

- City: Renfrew, Ontario
- League: CCHL
- Division: West Division
- Founded: 2020
- Home arena: MyFM Centre Recreation Complex
- Colours
- Owners: Todd Perry; Tina Perry; Carl Robillard; Michelle Brasseur-Robillard
- General manager: Carl Robillard
- Head coach: Devin Campbell
- Media: FloSports
- Affiliates: Renfrew Timberwolves
- Website: renfrewwolves.com

Franchise history
- 2014–2020: Kanata Lasers

The Renfrew Wolves are a Junior ice hockey team based in Renfrew, Ontario in the West division of the Central Canada Hockey League (CCHL). The team plays its home games at the MyFM Centre Recreation Complex. The franchise moved to Renfrew ahead of the 2021–22 CCHL season from Kanata, Ontario, where it was known the Kanata Lasers.

== History ==
The Wolves formed from the sale and relocation of the Kanata Lasers in 2020. The 2020–21 CCHL season was cancelled due to the COVID-19 pandemic. Consequently, the Wolves debuted in the 2021–22 CCHL season, making the playoffs in their inaugural season.

The Wolves home arena, the MyFM Centre Recreation Complex, underwent renovations in the years leading up to the Wolves' arrival, with the project ultimately going significantly over budget and becoming the subject of controversy and investigations.

In June 2026, it was announced that the Wolves franchise had been sold to the ownership group of Todd Perry, Tina Perry, Carl Robillard, and Michelle Brasseur-Robillard. Carl Robillard was also appointed as general manager.

Season-by-season record
| Season | GP | W | L | OTL | SOL | Pts | Finish | Playoffs |
|---|---|---|---|---|---|---|---|---|
| 2021–22 | 55 | 35 | 17 | 1 | 2 | 73 | 2nd in division 3rd overall | Won 1st round against Kemptville (4:2); Lost 2nd round against Ottawa (4:1) |
| 2022–23 | 55 | 30 | 18 | 4 | 3 | 67 | 2nd in division 5th overall | Won 1st round against Hawkesbury (4:1); Lost 2nd round against Smiths Falls (4:1) |
| 2023–24 | 55 | 32 | 20 | 3 | 0 | 67 | 2nd in division 5th overall | Lost 1st round against Rockland (4:2) |
| 2024–25 | 55 | 14 | 35 | 3 | 3 | 34 | 6th in division 12th overall | Did not qualify |
| 2025–26 | 55 | 26 | 24 | 3 | 2 | 57 | 3rd in division 6th overall | Lost quarterfinal against Ottawa (4:1) |

Source: "Renfrew Wolves hockey team statistics and history". hockeydb.com.

== See also ==
- Central Canada Hockey League
- MyFM Centre Recreation Complex
