= Smiths Falls Bears =

Junior ice hockey club

- City: Smiths Falls, Ontario
- League: CCHL
- Founded: 1961
- Home arena: Smiths Falls Memorial Community Centre
- Colours: Gold; Black
- Owner: Glenview Sports Entertainment Inc.
- General manager: Pat Malloy
- Head coach: Pat Malloy
- Media: FloSports
- Website: smithsfallsbearshockey.com

Franchise history
- 1961–1976: Smiths Falls Bears
- 1985–2000: Smiths Falls Bears
- 2000–2002: Lanark Thunder
- 2002–present: Smiths Falls Bears

The Smiths Falls Bears are a junior ice hockey club and franchise of the Central Canada Hockey League (CCHL) based in Smiths Falls, Ontario.

== History ==
The origins of the Smiths Falls Bears trace back to when the Central Junior Hockey League was formed in 1961 under the direction of the Montreal Canadiens.

In February 2000, a dressing room fire at Smiths Falls Memorial Community Centre destroyed almost all of the team's equipment. The equipment was replaced through donations and charities and Bears were able to finish the 1999–00 season. The following season the club franchise relocated to Lanark, Ontario and was rebranded as the Lanark Thunder.

Statistics
Season	GP	W	L	T	OTL	GF	GA	Pts	Regular season	Postseason
2002–03	55	9	39	7	2	196	317	25	5th in division	Did not qualify
2003–04	55	11	38	5	4	196	335	28	5th in division	Did not qualify
2004–05	57	9	42	1	5	165	304	24	5th in division	Did not qualify
2005–06	59	18	31	5	5	193	250	46	4th in division	Lost quarterfinal
2006–07	55	25	23	5	2	199	200	57	4th in division	Lost semifinal
2007–08	60	41	15	4	0	280	183	86	2nd overall	Lost final
2008–09	60	36	22	0	2	247	205	74	5th overall	Lost quarterfinal
2009–10	62	18	40	0	4	148	256	40	10th overall	Did not qualify
2010–11	62	27	29	0	6	191	229	60	8th overall	Lost quarterfinal
2011–12	62	30	30	0	2	220	240	62	8th overall	Lost quarterfinal
2012–13	62	36	22	0	4	235	183	76	7th overall	Lost quarterfinal
2013–14	62	41	17	0	4	238	174	86	2nd overall	Lost final against Carleton Place (4:1)
2014–15	62	28	26	3	5	173	206	64	5th in division 7th overall	Lost first round against Nepean (2:1)
2015–16	62	38	22	0	2	220	170	78	4th in division 6th overall	Lost quarterfinal against Hawkesbury (4:0)
2016–17	62	21	34	5	2	177	209	55	6th in division 7th overall	Lost quarterfinal against Cornwall (4:1)
2017–18	62	21	34	3	1	158	196	55	5th in division 9th overall	Did not qualify
2018–19	62	28	23	0	9	195	211	67	3rd in division 6th overall	Lost quarterfinal against Brockville (4:1)
2019–20	62	33	24	5	0	223	216	71	3rd in division 6th overall	Playoffs cancelled
2020–21	Season cancelled									
2021–22	55	25	25	4	1	193	216	55	5th in division 7th overall	Lost quarterfinal against Ottawa (4:0)
2022–23	55	37	15	1	2	232	165	77	1st in division 3rd overall	Won quarterfinal against Carleton Place (4:1); Won semifinal against Renfrew (4:1); Lost final against Ottawa (4:3)
2023–24	55	36	15	1	3	193	128	76	1st in division 2nd overall	Won quarterfinal against Carleton Place (4:1); Won semifinal against Cornwall (4:1); Lost final against Navan (4:2)
2024–25	55	30	19	5	1	168	142	66	2nd in division 4th overall	Won quarterfinal against Pembroke (4:2); Lost semifinal against Rockland (4:3)
2025–26	55	39	11	0	2	222	130	83	1st in division 2nd overall	Won quarterfinal against Brockville (4:0); Won semifinal against Ottawa (4:1)

Source: "Smiths Falls Bears statistics and history". hockeydb.com.

== Notable alumni ==
- Fred Brathwaite
- Joe DiPenta
- Rob Dopson
- Steve Poapst
- Billy Smith
- Steve Valiquette
- Jason York
- Rod Zaine
- Mark Borowiecki
- Zachary Senyshyn
