= Kanata Lasers =

Defunct junior ice hockey team

- Division: Robinson
- Operated: 2014–2020
- Home arena: Kanata Recreation Complex

Franchise history
- 1987–2002: Kanata Valley Lasers
- 2002–2014: Kanata Stallions
- 2014–2020: Kanata Lasers

The Kanata Lasers were a Junior ice hockey in the Central Canada Hockey League team based in Kanata, Ontario. Following the sale of the franchise in 2020, it relocated to Renfrew, Ontario and was rebranded as the Renfrew Wolves.

== Team history ==
The Kanata Valley Lasers began play in the Central Junior Hockey League in 1987-88 when an expansion franchise was granted to Kanata, Ontario, which was then a separate suburb of Ottawa. During their first 15 years as the Valley Lasers, the team never missed the playoffs, had the same head coach, Archie Mulligan, won 2 Art Bogart Cup championships in 1992 and 1997 won the Fred Page Cup in 1997.

In May 2002, the Kanata Sports Club sold the Kanata Valley Lasers to Dynasty Flooring Inc. The new ownership refurbished the team, renamed them the Kanata Stallions, and moved from the Jack Charron Arena to the Kanata Recreation Centre. To date, the Stallions have yet to finish in the top 5 and make the CJHL finals. In fact, in the 2004 playoffs, the Stallions upset the Cumberland Grads in seven games to advance to the semi-finals, but lost to the Nepean Raiders in six games. It was the only time to date that the Stallions made it past the first round of the playoffs. The Stallions missed the playoffs multiple times in recent years.

Kanata Stallions logo (2002-2014)

Kanata named former NHL player Chris Valentine as head coach for 2008-09, but was fired in October after a slow start. He was replaced with Vince Millette. The Stallions broke a CJHL record recently with a 26-game losing streak, breaking the 25 game losing streak held by the 1994-1995 Cumberland Grads.

In April 2010, it was announced that the Kanata Stallions would host the 2012 Fred Page Cup at the Kanata Recreation Centre. In the summer of 2011, head coach Adam Dewan was relieved of his duties. Randy Pierce took over the coaching helm, but was fired in February, leaving Corey Foster to replace him to finish the 2011-12 season. In March 2012, the Stallions missed the playoffs when they failed to win their last key games. Despite this, the Stallions' season was not done- being hosts, the team was given a shot at the Fred Page Cup. Battling against all odds, the Stallions were able to make the semi-finals in the tournament, only to fall to the Bogart Cup Champions and eventual tournament runner-up, the Nepean Raiders.

In Fall 2013, the Kanata Stallions announced they would be rebranded under a new ownership group. On January 5, 2014 the team tweeted that they will officially be rebranded as the Kanata Lasers, changing their Twitter handle and image. The club also announced new uniforms were in the works as part of the rebranding. At the end of the 2013-14 season, it was announced that Adam Dewan would return as head coach in the 2014-15 season.

The Kanata Lasers have been at the talk of relocation (even before the Ottawa Canadians of the CCHL2 moved to the Jack Charron Arena nearby). Kanata's destination for relocation has been Renfrew, Stittsville, and other communities in the Ottawa Valley.

The franchise sold in 2020 and subsequently relocated to Renfrew, Ontario. It debuted as the Renfrew Wolves in the 2021–22 CCHL season.

== Season-by-season record ==
Note: GP = Games Played, W = Wins, L = Losses, T = Ties, OTL = Overtime Losses, GF = Goals for, GA = Goals against

Season	GP	W	L	T	OTL	GF	GA	Points	Finish	Playoffs
1987-88	56	29	24	3	-	260	280	61	5th CJHL	
1988-89	56	31	24	1	0	263	200	63	5th CJHL	
1989-90	56	37	14	2	3	305	211	79	3rd CJHL	
1990-91	53	36	14	1	2	281	213	75	2nd CJHL	
1991-92	57	43	7	0	7	363	219	93	2nd CJHL	Won League
1992-93	57	34	16	4	3	347	227	75	2nd CJHL	
1993-94	57	33	15	5	4	304	259	75	2nd CJHL	
1994-95	54	23	20	7	4	221	229	57	7th CJHL	
1995-96	54	22	27	5	0	247	280	49	3rd Yzerman	
1996-97	54	42	9	3	0	261	170	87	1st Robinson	Won League, won FPC
1997-98	56	25	18	10	3	255	220	63	3rd Robinson	
1998-99	54	30	17	7	0	254	229	67	2nd Yzerman	
1999-00	56	25	25	6	0	228	229	56	3rd Yzerman	
2000-01	55	32	18	5	0	223	191	72	2nd Yzerman	
2001-02	55	26	21	11	0	205	208	63	3rd Yzerman	
2002-03	55	18	28	9	4	216	253	49	3rd Yzerman	
2003-04	55	21	25	9	0	205	234	51	3rd Yzerman	
2004-05	57	16	28	6	7	174	222	45	3rd Yzerman	
2005-06	57	26	24	3	4	236	233	59	5th in Yzerman	DNQ
2006-07	55	22	22	9	2	161	158	55	5th in Yzerman	Lost quarter-final
2007-08	60	22	32	3	3	185	231	50	8th CJHL	
2008-09	60	26	27	-	7	204	235	59	9th CJHL	DNQ
2009-10	62	15	42	-	5	180	291	35	11th CJHL	DNQ
2010-11	62	28	28	-	6	202	227	62	7th CCHL	Lost quarter-final
2011-12	62	24	32	-	6	214	259	54	9th CCHL	DNQ
2012-13	62	28	29	-	5	192	237	61	9th CCHL	DNQ
2013-14	62	21	34	-	7	192	260	49	11th CCHL	DNQ
2014-15	62	10	46	2	4	121	253	26	6th of 6 Yzerman; 12th of 12 CCHL	DNQ
2015-16	62	7	54	0	1	115	322	15	5th of 6 Yzerman; 11th of 12 CCHL	DNQ
2016-17	62	22	34	3	3	185	249	50	5th of 6 Yzerman; 11th of 12 CCHL	DNQ
2017-18	62	31	21	8	1	185	188	71	3rd of 6 Yzerman; 6th of 12 CCHL	Lost quarterfinals 0-4 (Braves)
2018-19	62	30	27	3	2	218	206	65	4th of 6 Robinson; 7th of 12 CCHL	Lost quarterfinals 1-4 (Senators)
2019-20	62	26	28	8	-	210	229	60	5th of 6 Robinson; 8th of 12 CCHL	Cancelled
2020-21	62	26	28	8	-	210	229	60	5th of 6 Robinson; 8th of 12 CCHL	Cancelled

== Fred Page Cup ==
Eastern Canada Championships
MHL - QAAAJHL - CCHL - Host
Round robin play with 2nd vs 3rd in semi-final to advance against 1st in the finals.

Year	Round Robin	Record	Standing	Semifinal	Gold Medal Game
2012	L, Woodstock Slammers 3-4; OTW, Nepean Raiders 2-1; W, Princeville Titans 7-4	2-1-0	2nd of 4	L, Nepean Raiders 1-6	n/a
1997	W, Summerside Western Capitals 6-1 ?, Brockville Braves ?-? ?, Longueuil Collège Français ?-?	?-?-?	1st of 4	n/a	W, Longueuil Collège Français 6-4; Fred Page Cup Champions

== Royal Bank Cup ==
CANADIAN NATIONAL CHAMPIONSHIPS
Dudley Hewitt Champions - Central, Fred Page Champions - Eastern, Western Canada Cup Champions - Western, Western Canada Cup - Runners Up and Host
Round robin play with top 4 in semi-final and winners to finals.

Year	Round Robin	Record	Standing	Semifinal	Gold Medal Game
1997	L, Weyburn Red Wings 3-7; W, Summerside Western Capitals 7-5; W, Rayside-Balfour Sabrecats 5-4; W, South Surrey Eagles 7-6	3-1	2nd of 5	L, South Surrey Eagles 2-4	n/a

== Championships ==
- CJHL Bogart Cup Championships: 1992, 1997
- Eastern Canadian Fred Page Cup Championships: 1997
- CJAHL Royal Bank Cup Championships: None

== Notable alumni ==
- Shean Donovan
- Kent Huskins
- Ryan Jardine
- Pat Kavanagh
- Marc Methot
- Sean O'Donnell
- Brad Ralph
- Todd White
- Jimmy Howard
- Patrick Sharp
- Cory Murphy
- Jack Quinn
- Ryan Coughlin
