= Rockland Nationals =

Junior ice hockey club

Rockland Nationals National de Rockland
- City: Clarence-Rockland
- League: CCHL
- Division: Yzerman
- Founded: 1968
- Home arena: Desjardins Centre
- Colours
- General manager: Jean-Maxime Paquin
- Head coach: Justin Pereira
- Website: rocklandnationalsjuniora.com

Franchise history
- 1968–1972: Ottawa M.&.W Rangers
- 1972–2005: Gloucester Rangers
- 2005–2008: Orleans Blues
- 2008–2017: Gloucester Rangers
- Since 2017: Rockland Nationals

The Rockland Nationals (French: Nationals de Rockland) are a junior ice hockey club and franchise of the Central Canada Hockey League (CCHL). The team plays its home games at the Desjardins Centre in Clarence-Rockland, Ontario.

== Team identity ==
The Rockland Nationals organization operates in both English and French. At home games, the first stanza of O Canada is sung in French, and the chorus is sung in English.

=== Crest and sweater design ===
Since 2017, the team's primary colours are blue, red, and white, the same colours as the New York Rangers. The home sweater is predominantly blue in colour with a maple leaf that says "Rockland Nationals" in the centre, and features four red and white stripes: one across each arm, one across the chest and the other across the waistline. The main road sweater is white with a blue and red stripe across the waist, with their red maple leaf logo in the centre.

In the 2024–25 season, the Nationals have unveiled a "Reverse Retro" alternate uniform in collaboration with Adidas. The uniform was essentially the same as their regular red uniform, but with the blue and white replaced by red and black lines.

== History ==
The franchise was established in 1968 as the Ottawa M.&.W (MacIntosh & Watts) Rangers. From 1972–2005, and 2008–2017, they were branded as the Gloucester Rangers. In 2017, the franchise moved to Rockland and was rebranded as the Rockland Nationals.

The Gloucester Rangers won the league championship Bogart Cup in 1970, 1971, 1981 and 1994. The Nationals won it in 2025 and 2026.

== Season-by-season record ==
Note: GP = Games Played, W = Wins, L = Losses, T = Ties, OTL = Overtime Losses, GF = Goals for, GA = Goals against

Season	GP	W	L	OTL	T	GF	GA	Points	Finish	Playoffs
1968-69	40	11	22	7	-	145	202	29	5th CJHL	
1969-70	40	30	6	4	-	198	108	64	1st CJHL	Won League
1970-71	48	26	12	10	-	235	158	62	2nd CJHL	Won League
1971-72	48	27	20	1	-	234	188	55	2nd CJHL	
1972-73	55	30	20	5	-	293	233	65	2nd CJHL	
1973-74	50	25	19	6	-	297	252	56	4th CJHL	
1974-75	50	14	27	9	-	241	289	37	5th CJHL	
1975-76	50	26	21	3	-	271	203	55	2nd CJHL	
1976-77	50	24	21	5	-	241	231	53	3rd CJHL	
1977-78	48	30	13	5	-	261	204	65	2nd CJHL	
1978-79	48	23	23	2	-	210	235	48	3rd CJHL	
1979-80	50	33	12	5	-	284	187	71	2nd CJHL	
1980-81	50	28	15	7	-	248	191	63	3rd CJHL	Won League
1981-82	50	11	36	3	-	191	266	25	6th CJHL	
1982-83	48	15	28	5	-	189	241	35	6th CJHL	
1983-84	53	21	16	6	-	233	235	48	6th CJHL	
1984-85	54	18	33	1	2	234	328	39	6th CJHL	
1985-86	60	35	21	1	3	311	247	74	4th CJHL	
1986-87	54	28	21	2	3	260	248	61	3rd CJHL	
1987-88	56	25	27	1	3	275	271	54	6th CJHL	
1988-89	55	10	39	1	5	203	316	26	9th CJHL	
1989-90	56	34	18	2	2	325	281	72	4th CJHL	
1990-91	54	32	15	2	5	347	276	71	3rd CJHL	
1991-92	57	40	12	4	1	360	233	85	3rd CJHL	
1992-93	56	30	18	3	5	308	261	68	5th CJHL	
1993-94	57	37	16	2	2	324	245	78	1st CJHL	Won League
1994-95	55	32	18	2	3	263	219	69	3rd CJHL	
1995-96	54	35	18	1	0	249	177	71	3rd in Yzerman	
1996-97	54	26	24	4	0	209	221	56	3rd in Yzerman	
1997-98	56	26	21	9	3	223	217	64	2nd in Yzerman	
1998-99	54	7	43	4	0	18	149	287	5th in Yzerman	Did not qualify
1999-00	55	11	41	4	0	26	177	307	5th in Yzerman	Did not qualify
2000-01	55	14	35	6	0	37	192	278	4th in Yzerman	Lost quarter-final 4-1 to Cornwall
2001-02	55	6	43	7	0	19	162	331	5th in Yzerman	Did not qualify
2002-03	55	27	17	11	2	67	246	210	3rd in Yzerman	Lost semi-final 4-3 to Nepean
2003-04	55	30	21	4	0	188	167	64	4th in Yzerman	Lost final 4-3 to Nepean
2004-05	57	24	26	1	6	194	204	55	3rd in Yzerman	Lost quarter-final 4-3 to Hawkesbury
2005-06	57	16	37	1	3	172	262	36	5th in Yzerman	Did not qualify
2006-07	55	26	21	6	2	184	190	60	2nd in Yzerman	Lost quarter-final 4-2 to Nepean
2007-08	60	14	38	4	4	188	301	36	10th CJHL	Did not qualify
2008-09	60	26	26	-	8	198	247	60	8th CJHL	Lost quarter-final 4-0 to Nepean
2009-10	62	35	21	-	6	277	225	76	4th CJHL	Lost quarter-final 4-2 to Ottawa
2010-11	62	35	25	-	2	263	244	72	4th CCHL	Lost semi-final 4-0 to Pembroke
2011-12	62	13	46	-	3	186	325	29	12th CCHL	Did not qualify
2012-13	62	19	35	-	8	166	246	46	10th CCHL	Did not qualify
2013-14	62	23	32	-	7	219	280	53	9th CCHL	Did not qualify
2014-15	62	31	30	-	1	199	223	63	3rd of 6 in Yzerman; 9th of 12 CCHL	Won Prelim. Playin, 2-0 (73's); Lost Quarterfinals, 0-4 (Jr. Senators)
2015-16	62	5	52	3	2	116	305	15	6th of 6 in Yzerman; 12th of 12 CCHL	Did not qualify
2016-17	62	22	34	3	3	141	204	50	4th of 6 in Yzerman; 10th of 12 CCHL	Did not qualify
Rockland Nationals
2017–18	62	28	28	6	0	186	204	62	4th in division 8th overall	Lost quarterfinal against Carleton Place (4:1)
2018–19	62	40	17	5	0	205	151	85	2nd in division 4th overall	Won quarterfinal against Hawkesbury (4:1); Lost semifinals against Carleton Place (4:1)
2019–20	62	39	19	4	0	254	183	82	1st in division 2nd overaell	Cancelled
2020–21	9	4	5	0	0	28	25	8	Season canceled	
2021–22	55	24	24	7	0	166	188	55	4th in division 9th overall	Lost tie-break game against Smiths Falls (1:0)
2022–23	55	20	23	12	0	172	203	52	5th in division 10th overall	Did not qualify
2023–24	55	32	19	4	0	202	175	68	3rd in division 4th overall	Won quarterfinal against Renfrew (4:2); Lost semifinal against Navan (4:1)
2024–25	55	45	8	2	0	250	138	96	1st in division 1st overall	Won quarterfinal against Cornwall (4:0); Won semifinal against Smiths Falls (4:3); Won final against Carleton Place (4:0); Advanced to Centennial Cup
2025–26	55	52	3	0	0	284	125	104	1st in division 1st overall	Won quarterfinal against Carleton Place (4:1); Won semifinal against Kemptville (4:0); Won final against Smiths Falls (4:0); Advanced to Centennial Cup

Source: "Rockland Nationals statistics and history". hockeydb.com.

== National championships ==
The Gloucester Rangers were runners-up for the 1995 Centennial Cup national championship. In 2025, the Nationals were eliminated in the semifinal by the Calgary Canucks. In 2026, they were eliminated after losing three out of four matches in the preliminary round.

Year	Round-robin	Record	Standing	Quarterfinal	Semifinal	Championship
2025	OTL, Edmundston Blizzard (MJHL), 3-4; W, Valleyfield Braves, (LHAAAQ), 9-4; W, Calgary Canucks (Host), 7-2; L, Melfort Mustangs (SJHL), 2-5	2-0-1-1	3rd of 5 Pool B	Won, 4-0; Northern Manitoba Blizzard (MJHL)	OT Loss, 2-3; Calgary Canucks (Host -AJHL)	Did not qualify
2026	OTL, Canmore Eagles (AJHL), 2-3; L, Summerside Western Capitals, (Host), 2-4; W, Thunder Bay North Stars (SIJHL), 8-2; L, Niverville Nighthawks (MJHL), 6-7	1-0-2-1	4th of 5 Pool A	Did not qualify	Did not qualify	Did not qualify

== Notable alumni ==
- Mark Aubry
- Dan Boyle
- Todd Charlesworth
- Mathieu Dandenault
- P.C. Drouin
- Blake Dunlop
- Robert Esche
- Todd Flichel
- Mark Fraser
- Garry Galley
- Steve Guenette
- Derek Holmes
- Claude Loiselle
- Larry Robinson
- Moe Robinson
- Andre Savage
- Larry Trader
- Bob Warner
- Steve Washburn
- Sean Whyte
