= MyFM Centre Recreation Complex =

Sports facility in Renfrew, Ontario, opened 1988

Coordinates: 45.4658°N 76.6941°W

MyFM Centre
- Interactive map of MyFM Centre
- Former names: Ma-Te-Way Activity Centre (1988–2022)
- Address: 1 Ma-Te-Way Park Drive
- Location: Renfrew, Ontario, Canada
- Owner: Jon Pole
- Operator: Town of Renfrew
- Capacity: Concerts: 1,600; Ice hockey: 634 (1,200 with standing room) (main rink)
- Record attendance: 740 (February 19, 2024)
- Field size: 200 feet (61 m) x 85 feet (26 m) (ice rinks)

Construction
- Groundbreaking: April 16, 1986
- Opened: 1988
- Renovated: 2024
- Cost: C$1.4 million

Tenants
- Renfrew Timberwolves (EOJHL) (1988–present); Renfrew Wolves (CCHL) (2021–present)

MyFM Centre is a sports facility located in Renfrew, Ontario. The facility holds two ice rinks, a gymnasium, a baseball field, a fitness centre as well as four community rooms for special events. The main rink holds 634 seats and is the home of the Renfrew Wolves of the Central Canada Hockey League (CCHL), as well as the Renfrew Timberwolves of the Eastern Ontario Junior Hockey League (EOJHL).

The NHA/NHL Birthplace Museum is located inside the facility.

== History ==
The building opened in 1988 as the Ma-Te-Way Activity Centre. It underwent renovations in the years leading up to the Wolves' arrival, with the project ultimately going significantly over budget and becoming the subject of controversy and investigations.

The Renfrew Wolves had their first full house in franchise history on February 19, 2024 against their rival Pembroke Lumber Kings, when 740 people attended the game.

== See also ==
- Renfrew Wolves
- Renfrew Timberwolves
