= Carleton Place Canadians =

Central Canada Hockey League team in Carleton Place, Ontario

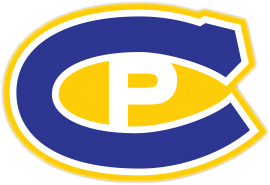
- City: Carleton Place, Ontario
- Division: Robinson
- Founded: 1969
- Home arena: Carleton Place Arena
- Colours: Royal blue, gold, white
- Owners: Adam Ali & Jake McDermott
- General manager: Sebastien Lamarche
- Head coach: Cole Burton
- Captain: Vacant
- Media: FloSports
- Website: www.cpcanadians.com

Franchise history
- Carleton Place Legion Kings; 1969–2007 (EOJHL); Carleton Place Kings; 2007–2009 (EOJHL); Carleton Place Canadians; 2009–present (CCHL)

The Carleton Place Canadians are a Junior A ice hockey team based in Carleton Place, Ontario. The Canadians compete in the Central Canada Hockey League (CCHL) as a member of the Robinson Division, which is the west division of the league. The team was established in 1969, along with the Kemptville 73's, when they were moved from the Eastern Ontario Junior B Hockey League (EOJBHL). The Canadians have played their home games at the Carleton Place Arena since 1969, which was built the same year in order to host the team. With a seating capacity of only 668 people, it is the second-smallest arena in the CCHL, and is often seen at full capacity during special occasions due to its small size. The Canadians are owned by Adam Ali and Jake McDermott, who purchased the club in 2026 from Brent Sullivan.

The team has advanced to the Bogart Cup Final six times in a row between 2014 and 2019, winning four consecutive titles from 2014 to 2017. The Canadians, along with the Pembroke Lumber Kings, are the two CCHL franchises to have broken the most league records during the regular season, and own the all-time league record for finishing with the most points during a season with 110, in the 2013–14 and 2017–18 seasons.

The Carleton Place Kings logo (2007–2009)

== History ==
=== Early years ===
The team was founded in 1969 as the Carleton Place Legion Kings in the Renfrew-Lanark Junior C Hockey League. Soon after, the league folded and the Legion Kings ended up in the Rideau-St. Lawrence Junior B Hockey League in 1971. This league later became the Eastern Ontario Junior Hockey League. In 2009, it was announced that the team had been granted expansion to the Central Junior A Hockey League (now Central Canada Hockey League). Although the CCHL franchise has a different name, the Legion Kings are still considered the forerunner to the Canadians franchise.

The Canadians played their first Junior A game on 11 September 2009 at Carleton Place Arena, and have lost the game 4–1 against the Nepean Raiders. They won their first ever CJHL game two days later, on 13 September, defeating the Ottawa Jr. Senators 3–2 in a shootout on the road.

=== Recent years and playoff success ===
The 2013–14 season was a landmark season for Carleton Place. They shattered both the CCHL's wins and points records (110) en route to their first regular season title, falling one win short of shattering the 1972–73 Pembroke Lumber Kings league record for the best winning percentage (0.891). They won the first round by beating their rivals Kemptville 73's 4–0 and then beating Pembroke 4–3 in the semi-final round. In the Bogart Cup Final, they won their first Bogart Cup against their Lanark County rivals Smiths Falls Bears with an overtime goal at home in overtime. They went on to win against the St-Jerôme Panthers 3–1 to win their first Fred Page Cup. The Canadians lost the Centennial Cup Final in a double-overtime loss to the Yorkton Terriers. In the 2014 playoffs, the Canadians played nine games at home with seven of them played at full capacity, for an average of 779 fans per game. The Carleton Place Arena has seen standing room capacity crowds of 1,100 fans attended Game 7 of the semi-final round, as well as Game 1 and 5 of the Bogart Cup Final, which represents more than 400 people of the listed capacity.

The team has won the Bogart Cup for a second consecutive season in 2015, as well as in 2016 and 2017 for a total of four Bogart Cups in a row, making them the second team in CCHL history to have won four consecutive titles. They were eliminated in the Bogart Cup Final in both 2017–18 and 2018–19 seasons against the futur back-to-back champion Ottawa Jr. Senators, who ultimately became the third team in league history to have won four championships, as they won another back-to-back titles in 2022 and 2023. The Canadians made another Bogart Cup Final appearance in 2025, but were swept in four games against futur back-to-back champion Rockland Nationals.

== Season-by-season record ==
| **Season** | **GP** | **W** | **L** | **T** | **OTL** | **GF** | **GA** | **PTS** | **Finish** | **Playoffs** |
| 1969–82 | Statistics Not Available | | | | | | | | | |
| 1981–82 | 40 | 18 | 15 | 7 | 0 | 227 | 209 | 43 | 2nd in EO NEast | |
| 1982–83 | 32 | 13 | 25 | 4 | 0 | 207 | 271 | 30 | 6th in EO Valley | |
| 1983–84 | Statistics Not Available | | | | | | | | | |
| 1984–85 | 36 | 14 | 20 | 2 | 0 | 160 | 232 | 30 | 4th in EO Valley | |
| 1985–86 | 36 | 14 | 19 | 3 | 0 | 198 | 220 | 31 | 4th in EO NWest | |
| 1986–87 | 39 | 12 | 26 | 1 | 0 | 181 | 257 | 25 | 6th in EO Valley | |
| 1987–1999 | Statistics Not Available | | | | | | | | | |
| 1999–00 | 40 | 21 | 16 | 3 | 3 | 174 | 167 | 50 | 2nd in EO Valley | Lost Division Semi-final |
| 2000–01 | 45 | 26 | 20 | 2 | 1 | 171 | 153 | 55 | 3rd in EO Valley | Lost Semi-final |
| 2001–02 | 40 | 13 | 25 | 2 | 2 | 139 | 167 | 30 | 6th in EO Valley | Lost Preliminary |
| 2002–03 | 40 | 19 | 18 | 3 | 2 | 176 | 168 | 43 | 3rd in EO Valley | Lost Preliminary |
| 2003–04 | 40 | 18 | 19 | 3 | 2 | 153 | 162 | 41 | 3rd in EO Valley | Lost Preliminary |
| 2004–05 | 40 | 14 | 20 | 5 | 1 | 144 | 185 | 34 | 4th in EO Valley | Lost Division Final |
| 2005–06 | 40 | 19 | 17 | 2 | 2 | 166 | 151 | 42 | 3rd in EO Valley | Lost Division Semi-final |
| 2006–07 | 40 | 13 | 20 | 5 | 2 | 159 | 204 | 33 | 5th in EO Valley | Lost Division Final |
| 2007–08 | 39 | 25 | 10 | 3 | 1 | 176 | 135 | 54 | 1st in EO Valley | Lost Conference Final |
| 2008–09 | 40 | 28 | 6 | 4 | 2 | 201 | 116 | 62 | 1st in EO Valley | Lost Conference Final |
| 2009–10 | 62 | 25 | 35 | - | 2 | 196 | 234 | 52 | 9th in CJHL | Did not qualify |
| 2010–11 | 62 | 32 | 26 | - | 4 | 206 | 202 | 68 | 5th in CCHL | Lost quarterfinals 4–2 to Gloucester Rangers |
| 2011–12 | 62 | 41 | 18 | - | 3 | 265 | 180 | 85 | 4th in CCHL | Lost quarterfinals 4–0 to Hawkesbury Hawks |
| 2012–13 | 62 | 40 | 19 | - | 3 | 248 | 164 | 83 | 1st of 6 in Robinson; 2nd of 12 in CCHL | Won quarterfinals 4–1 over Smiths Falls Bears Lost semi-finals 4–3 to Cornwall Colts |
| 2013–14 | 62 | 54 | 6 | - | 2 | 293 | 149 | 110 | 1st of 6 in Robinson; 1st of 12 CCHL | **Won quarterfinals 4–0 over Kemptville 73's** **Won semi-finals 4–3 over Pembroke Lumber Kings** **Won Bogart Cup Final 4–1 over Smiths Falls Bears** |
| 2014–15 | 62 | 49 | 10 | - | 3 | 245 | 131 | 101 | 1st of 6 in Robinson; 1st of 12 in CCHL | **Won quarterfinals 4–0 over Nepean Raiders** **Won semi-finals 4–2 over Cornwall Colts** **Won Bogart Cup Final 4–1 over Pembroke Lumber Kings** |
| 2015–16 | 62 | 43 | 16 | - | 3 | 247 | 178 | 89 | 1st of 6 in Robinson; 1st of 12 in CCHL | **Won quarterfinals 4–1 over Pembroke Lumber Kings** **Won semi-finals 4–0 over Brockville Braves** **Won Bogart Cup Final 4–3 over Ottawa Jr. Senators** |
| 2016–17 | 62 | 50 | 12 | - | 0 | 252 | 135 | 100 | 1st of 6 in Robinson; 1st of 12 in CCHL | **Won quarterfinals 4–1 over Nepean Raiders** **Won semi-finals 4–2 over Kemptville 73's** **Won Bogart Cup Final 4–1 over Ottawa Jr. Senators** |
| 2017–18 | 62 | 53 | 5 | - | 4 | 257 | 105 | 110 | 1st of 6 in Robinson; 1st of 12 in CCHL | Won quarterfinals 4–1 over Rockland Nationals Won semi-finals 4–0 over Hawkesbury Hawks Lost Bogart Cup Final 4–1 to Ottawa Jr. Senators |
| 2018–19 | 62 | 44 | 11 | | 7 | 236 | 140 | 95 | 1st of 6 in Robinson; 1st of 12 in CCHL | Won quarterfinals 4–0 over Navan Grads Won semi-finals 4–1 over Rockland Nationals Lost Bogart Cup Final 4–1 to Ottawa Jr. Senators |
| 2019–20 | 62 | 49 | 7 | - | 6 | 263 | 139 | 104 | 1st of 6 in Robinson; 1st of 12 in CCHL | Playoffs canceled due to COVID-19 pandemic |
| 2020–21 | Season canceled due to COVID-19 pandemic | | | | | | | | | |
| 2021–22 | 55 | 18 | 32 | - | 5 | 166 | 215 | 41 | 6th of 6 in Robinson; 12th of 12 in CCHL | Did not qualify |
| 2022–23 | 55 | 31 | 20 | - | 4 | 210 | 183 | 66 | 3rd of 6 in Robinson; 6th of 12 in CCHL | Lost quarterfinals 4–1 to Smiths Falls Bears |
| 2023–24 | 55 | 28 | 24 | - | 3 | 175 | 191 | 59 | 3rd of 6 in Robinson; 7th of 12 in CCHL | Lost quarterfinals 4–1 to Smiths Falls Bears |
| 2024–25 | 55 | 36 | 15 | - | 4 | 203 | 149 | 76 | 1st of 6 in Robinson; 2nd of 12 in CCHL | Won quarterfinals 4–0 over Kemptville 73's Won semi-finals 4–3 over Navan Grads Lost Bogart Cup Final 4–0 to Rockland Nationals |
| 2025–26 | 55 | 24 | 28 | - | 3 | 175 | 213 | 51 | 5th of 6 in Robinson; 8th of 12 in CCHL | Lost quarterfinals 4–1 to Rockland Nationals |

Note: Bogart Cup championship seasons are bolded

== Fred Page Cup ==
Eastern Canada Championships
MHL - QAAAJHL - CCHL - Host
Round robin play with 2nd vs 3rd in semi-final to advance against 1st in the finals.

| Year | Round Robin | Record | Standing | Semi-finals | Gold Medal Game |
| 2014 | W, St. Jerome Panthers 6–4; W, Granby Inouk 4–2; L, Cornwall Colts 3–6 | 3–0–0 | 1st of 4 | n/a | W, St. Jerome Panthers 3–1; Fred Page Cup Champions advance to Royal Bank Cup |
| 2015 | W, Dieppe Commandos 3–1; W, Longueuil Collège Français 4–2; W, Truro Bearcats 2–1 | 2–1–0 | 1st of 4 | n/a | W, Dieppe Commandos 3–1; Fred Page Cup Champions advance to Royal Bank Cup |
| 2016 | W, Woodstock Slammers 5–2; W, Pictou County Crushers 3–1; W, Longueuil Collège Français 6–3 | 3–0–0 | 1st of 4 | n/a | W, Woodstock Slammers 4–2; Fred Page Cup Champions advance to Royal Bank Cup |
| 2017 | SOL, Longueuil Collège Français 1–2; SOL, Terrebonne Cobras 7–8; W, Truro Bearcats 3–1 | 1–0–2 | 3rd of 4 | W, Longueuil Collège Français 2-0 | L, Terrebonne Cobras 2-5 |
| 2018 | L, Longueuil College Francais 1–2; L, Ottawa Jr. Senators 2–3; L, Edmundston Blizzard 3–5 | 0–3–0 | 4th of 4 | did not qualify for playoffs | |

== Royal Bank Cup ==
CANADIAN NATIONAL CHAMPIONSHIPS
Dudley Hewitt Champions - Central, Fred Page Champions - Eastern, Western Canada Cup Champions - Western, Western Canada Cup - Runners Up and Host
Round robin play with top 4 in semi-final and winners to finals.

| Year | Round Robin | Record W-OTW-OTL-L | Standing | Semi-finals | Gold Medal Game |
|---|---|---|---|---|---|
| 2014 | W, Vernon Vipers 3–2; OTL, Dauphin Kings 3–4; W, Toronto Patriots 4–2; L, Yorkton Terriers 1–3 | 2–0–1–1 | 4th of 5 | W, Dauphin Kings 5–3 | OTL, Yorkton Terriers 3–4 |
| 2015 | W, Soo Thunderbirds 4–0; W, Portage Terriers 3–0; L, Penticton Vees 3–4; OTL, Melfort Mustangs 3–4 | 2–0–1–1 | 3rd of 5 | 2OTW, Penticton Vees 2–1 | L, Portage Terriers 2–5 |
| 2016 | L, Trenton Golden Hawks 1–3; OTL, Lloydminster Bandits 3–4; L, West Kelowna Warriors 1–4; L, Brooks Bandits 4–5 | 0–0–1–3 | 5th of 5 | Did not qualify | |

== Sources ==
- "Carleton Place Junior A and Junior B hockey clubs announce new ownership". Central Canada Hockey League. 2 September 2026.
