= Brockville Braves =

Junior ice hockey club

- City: Brockville
- League: CCHL
- Home arena: Brockville Memorial Centre
- Colours
- Owners: Dustin Traylen; Kris Hodgins
- General manager: Ryan Leonard
- Head coach: Andy Bryan
- Farm club: Brockville Tikis
- Website: Official website

Championships
- League: 1986; 1998
- Regional: 1998; 2010

The Brockville Braves is a junior ice hockey club and franchise of the Central Canada Hockey League (CCHL). The team plays its home games at the Brockville Memorial Centre in Brockville, Ontario.

== History ==
The Braves won their first league championship in 1986.

In 1998, the Braves won their second league championship and their first Fred Page Cup regional championship.

In 2010, the Braves won their second Fred Page Cup. The Braves were admitted to the regional tournament as the host team, despite having lost in the league final against the Pembroke Lumber Kings.

In 2026, Kris Hodgins became a part-owner of the Braves, partnering with Dustin Traylen. Andy Bryan was hired as head coach.

Statistics
Season	GP	W	L	T	OTL	Pts	GF	GA	Regular season	Post-season
1963–64	32	11	20	1	–	23	111	135	7th overall	Lost quarterfinal against Buckingham (4:2)
1964–65	36	16	16	4	–	36	165	141	7th overall	Lost quarterfinal against Cornwall (4:3)
1965–66	36	19	16	1	–	39	188	175	5th overall	Lost quarterfinal against Cornwall (4:2)
1966–67	50	19	25	6	–	44	173	218	3rd overall	Lost semifinal against Smiths Falls (4:1)
1967–68	40	25	11	4	–	54	193	152	1st overall	Lost semifinal against Cornwall (4:0)
1968–69	40	13	19	8	–	34	166	183	3rd overall	Lost semifinal against Hull (4:1)
1969–70	40	22	13	5	–	49	180	156	2nd overall	Won semifinal against Smiths Falls (4:2); Lost final against Ottawa (4:1)
1970–71	48	16	29	3	–	35	174	244	4th overall	Lost semifinal against Ottawa (4:1)
1971–72	48	24	22	2	–	50	198	181	3rd overall	Lost semifinal against Smiths Falls (4:1)
1972–73	55	26	27	2	–	54	273	290	3rd overall	Did not participate
1973–74	50	16	29	5	–	37	234	322	5th overall	Did not qualify
1974–75	50	10	36	4	–	24	218	329	6th overall	Did not qualify
1975–76	50	17	23	10	–	44	204	212	4th overall	
1976–77	50	17	20	13	–	47	252	270	5th overall	Did not qualify
1977–78	48	10	32	6	–	26	165	268	5th overall	Did not qualify
1978–79	48	9	38	1	–	19	205	349	5th overall	Did not qualify
1979–80	50	10	35	5	–	25	209	391	5th overall	Did not qualify
1980–81	50	20	24	6	–	46	183	223	4th overall	
1981–82	50	19	27	4	–	42	237	281	5th overall	Did not qualify
1982–83	48	22	18	8	–	52	248	198	3rd overall	Lost quarterfinal against Hawkesbury (3:1)
1983–84	54	26	20	8	–	60	315	245	2nd overall	Lost quarterfinal against Hawkesbury
1984–85	54	37	15	1	1	76	364	237	2nd overall	
1985–86	60	41	17	2	0	84	360	285	1st overall	Won quarterfinal against Hawkesbury (4:0); Won semifinal against Nepean (4:0); Won final against Pembroke (4:2)
1986–87	52	16	29	3	4	39	213	309	7th overall	Did not qualify
1987–88	56	35	16	3	2	75	335	224	3rd overall	
1988–89	56	37	14	0	5	79	322	230	2nd overall	
1989–90	56	38	12	4	2	82	377	256	2nd overall	
1990–91	50	12	32	1	5	30	139	327	9th overall	Did not qualify
1991–92	57	13	41	1	2	29	211	346	4th in division 9th overall	Lost quarterfinal against Kanata
1992–93	57	19	29	4	5	47	235	297	4th in division 8th overall	Lost quarterfinal against Kanata (4:1)
1993–94	57	24	22	3	8	59	279	275	5th in division 7th overall	Did not qualify
1994–95	54	26	24	2	2	56	222	219	4th in division 8th overall	
1995–96	54	25	27	2	0	52	249	247	2nd in division 6th overall	Lost quarterfinal against Ottawa
1996–97	53	28	18	7	0	63	234	206	3rd in division 4th overall	
1997–98	56	39	11	3	3	84	283	222	1st in division 1st overall	Won quarterfinal against Nepean (4:1); Won semifinal Won final against Cornwall (4:0)
1998–99	54	39	11	4	0	82	294	190	1st in division 2nd overall	Won quarterfinal against Ottawa (4:3); Won semifinal against Kanata (4:3); Lost final against Hawkesbury (4:2)
1999–00	56	39	12	5	0	83	285	221	1st in division 2nd overall	Won quarterfinal Won semifinal Lost final against Cornwall
2000–01	55	9	43	3	0	21	167	295	5th in division 10th overall	Did not qualify
2001–02	55	12	32	8	3	35	213	302	5th in division 9th overall	Did not qualify
2002–03	55	21	26	7	1	50	226	274	2nd in division 6th overall	Lost quarterfinal against Nepean (4:1)
2003–04	55	27	21	5	2	61	223	219	2nd in division 5th overall	Lost quarterfinal against Gloucester (4:3)
2004–05	57	34	13	8	2	78	214	162	3rd in division 3rd overall	Lost quarterfinal against Pembroke (4:3)
2005–06	59	29	22	5	3	66	213	201	3rd in division 5th overall	Lost quarterfinal against Nepean (4:3)
2006–07	55	28	20	6	1	63	201	190	2nd in division 3rd overall	Lost quarterfinal against Smiths Falls (4:2)
2007–08	60	38	18	3	1	80	270	196	3rd in division 3rd overall	Won quarterfinal against Nepean (4:2); Lost semifinal against Smiths Falls (4:1)
2008–09	60	36	20	–	4	76	240	185	3rd in division 4th overall	Won quarterfinal against Smiths Falls (4:1); Lost semifinal against Pembroke (4:3)
2009–10	62	52	8	–	2	106	308	140	1st in division 1st overall	Won quarterfinal against Kemptville (4:0); Won semifinal against Ottawa (4:0); Lost final against Pembroke (4:1)
2010–11	62	44	15	–	3	91	233	160	2nd in division 3rd overall	Won quarterfinal against Nepean (4:3); Lost semifinal against Cornwall (4:1)
2011–12	62	41	17	–	4	86	242	186	2nd in division 3rd overall	Lost quarterfinal against Pembroke (4:1)
2012–13	62	35	20	–	7	77	215	192	3rd in division 6th overall	Lost quarterfinal against Cornwall (4:2)
2013–14	62	35	24	–	3	73	216	200	3rd in division 5th overall	Lost quarterfinal against Pembroke (4:2)
2014–15	62	31	25	–	6	68	215	219	4th in division 6th overall	Lost quarterfinal against Pembroke (4:1)
2015–16	62	40	19	–	3	83	197	161	3rd in division 4th overall	Won quarterfinal against Cumberland (4:0); Lost semifinal against Carleton Place (4:0)
2016–17	62	33	26	–	3	69	179	162	5th in division 6th overall	Lost quarterfinal against Ottawa (4:1)
2017–18	62	38	20	–	4	80	210	160	2nd in division 3rd overall	Won quarterfinal against Kanata (4:0); Lost semifinal against Ottawa (4:3)
2018–19	62	41	16	–	5	87	202	149	2nd in division 3rd overall	Won quarterfinal against Smiths Falls (4:1); Lost semifinal against Ottawa (4:0)
2019–20	62	36	16	–	10	82	213	173	2nd in division 3rd overall	Cancelled
2020–21	Cancelled									
2021–22	55	36	17	–	2	74	198	155	1st in division 3rd overall	Won quarterfinal against Pembroke (4:3); Lost semifinal against Hawkesbury (4:1)
2022–23	55	29	18	–	8	66	166	154	4th in division 7th overall	Won quarterfinal against Navan (4:3); Lost semifinal against Ottawa (4:1)
2023–24	55	8	40	–	7	23	136	272	6th in division 12th overall	Did not qualify
2024–25	55	27	24	–	4	58	181	195	4th in division 6th overall	Lost quarterfinal against Navan (4:3)
2025–26	55	22	24	–	9	53	183	211	4th in division 7th overall	Lost quarterfinal against Smiths Falls (4:0)

Source: "Brockville Braves hockey team statistics and history". hockeydb.com.

== Regional championships ==
Eastern Canada Championships
MHL - QAAAJHL - CCHL - Host
Round robin play with 2nd vs 3rd in semi-finals to advance against 1st in the finals.

Year	Round Robin	Record	Standing	Semi-finals	Gold Medal Game
2010	W, Woodstock Slammers 6–0; W, Pembroke Lumber Kings 2–1; W, Terrebonne Cobras 5–2	3–0–0	1st of 4	n/a	W, Pembroke Lumber Kings 5–1; Fred Page Cup Champions advance to Royal Bank Cup
1998	?, Restigouche River Rats ?-? ?, Coaticook Frontaliers ?-? ?, Kanata Valley Lasers ?-?	No data	No data	n/a	W, Restigouche River Rats 4–1; Fred Page Cup Champions advance to Royal Bank Cup
1997	OTL, Longueuil Collège Français 5–6; OTW, Summerside Western Capitals 5–4 ?, Kanata Valley Lasers ?-?	1–2–0	3rd of 4	L, Longueuil Collège Français ?-?	n/a

== Sources ==
- "The Brockville Tikis are back". Brockville Braves. 24 April 2026.
- "Brockville Braves announce new ownership". Central Canada Hockey League. 24 June 2026.
