= 2020–21 CCHL season =

60th season of the CCHL

- League: Central Canada Hockey League
- Sport: Ice hockey
- Duration: Cancelled
- Teams: 12

CCHL seasons
- ← 2019–20 2021–22 →

The 2020–21 CCHL season was cancelled due to public health restrictions related to the COVID-19 pandemic. The league held a small number of exhibition games under strict conditions, including no body checking; no spectators, or a limited number of spectators; players were allowed into the arena no more than 20 minutes before the start time, and they were not permitted to shower in the dressing rooms.

== See also ==
- COVID-19 pandemic in Ontario
- Timeline of the COVID-19 pandemic in Ontario (2020)
- Timeline of the COVID-19 pandemic in Ontario (2021)

== Sources ==
- "CCHL to drop puck for 59th season October 1st". thecchl.ca (Press release). 15 July 2020.
- "Commissioner Kevin Abrams update on return to play for 2020–21 season". thecchl.ca (Press release). 4 September 2020.
- "Update on return to play for 2020–21". thecchl.ca (Press release). 14 January 2021.
- Warren, Ken (1 December 2020). "WARREN: The hockey world pays tribute to CCHL giant Lou Nistico". Ottawa Sun. Postmedia.
