= Ottawa Jr. Senators =

Central Canada Hockey League team in Ontario, Canada

Ottawa Junior Senators
- Nickname: Jr. Sens
- City: Ottawa, Ontario, Canada
- League: Central Canada Hockey League
- Division: East Division
- Founded: 1979
- Home arena: Jim Durrell Recreation Centre
- Colours: Blue, red, white
- Owner: Martin Dagenais
- General manager: Patrick McCallen
- Head coach: Mark Grady
- Media: FloSports

Franchise history
- 1979–1992: Ottawa Senators
- 1992–present: Ottawa Junior Senators

The Ottawa Junior Senators (French: Sénateurs Juniors d'Ottawa), colloquially known as the Jr. Sens, are a Junior A ice hockey team based in Ottawa. The Junior Senators compete in the Central Canada Hockey League (CCHL) as a member of the East Division and play their home games at the 2,000-seat Peplinski Arena, inside the Jim Durrell Recreation Centre building.

Founded in 1979, the team is the second franchise in the City of Ottawa to use the Senators name, but is not affiliated with the NHL Ottawa Senators.

== History ==
The Senators joined the Central Junior A Hockey League in 1979. In 1992, the Ottawa Senators changed their name to the Ottawa Junior Senators and nickname to the Jr. Sens following the founding of the NHL team of the same name. Ottawa won their first Art Bogart Cup in 1983 over Pembroke. Ten years later, they won their second championship. In 1995, Ottawa came close against the Cornwall Colts for their third championship. The 2000-01 season was memorable for the Junior Senators as they achieved the lowest goals allowed in the league (173) and finished 2nd, despite being 10 points behind the Cornwall Colts, as both teams met in the championship finals. The series went to 7 games, but the Junior Senators lost in a humiliating 7-0 loss.

The following year, the Junior Senators were determined to repeat their previous season, and settled for 3rd overall behind Cornwall and Nepean. Ottawa managed to defeat Nepean in 6 games and return to the final. This time, Ottawa won the series in 5 games and qualified for the Fred Page Cup in Truro. The semi-final game against the Valleyfield Braves and Ottawa Junior Senators meant the winner would go to the Royal Bank Cup in Halifax, as the hosts Halifax Oland Exports already earned a bye to the final. Ottawa punched their ticket to the Royal Bank Cup winning 7-2 over the Braves. Ottawa lost the Fred Page Cup championship game 4-2 to Halifax.

At the Royal Bank Cup, the Jr. Sens ended up finishing 4th with a 1-3 record. Ottawa faced Halifax for the fourth time, and the semi-final was a back and forth scoring game, but Halifax ended up taking the game 9-7 and eventually capturing the Royal Bank Cup.

The championship team was lost in a blockbuster trade with the Gloucester Rangers, who were rebuilding their team and overcoming a dead-last finish in the 2001-02 standings. Despite only carrying three returnees, the Junior Senators still managed to upset the top 2 teams in the league en route to the Art Bogart Cup against Nepean. Ottawa couldn't handle the Nepean Raiders and lost the series in 5 games.

The Ottawa Junior Senators wouldn't return to the semi-finals until 2009. Ottawa lost the previous three game 7 semi-final games. The most-heartbreaking loss was in 2015, when the Pembroke Lumber Kings scored the game winner with just under a minute left in the game.

For the 2012-13 season, the Ottawa Junior Senators changed their colours back to blue, white and red, and returned to their old logo that they last used in 1995.

In fall 2016, the Junior Senators were chosen to host the Fred Page Cup in 2018. Ottawa was slated to host the 2003 tournament, but pulled out and hosting duties were awarded to Cornwall.

After appearing in the championship final for two consecutive years, but falling to the Carleton Place Canadians, the 2017-18 Junior Senators were finally able to conquer their arch nemesis who were once again favored to win it all. Ottawa surprised the hockey observers by knocking out Carleton Place in five games. They then followed the act by claiming their first ever Fred Page Cup which earned them a trip to the Royal Bank Cup in Chilliwack, British Columbia where they lost in the semi-finals to the host Chiefs.

In the 2018-19 season, Ottawa faced Carleton Place in the finals for the fourth consecutive season. The Junior Senators took it to the favoured Canadians and claim the championship series in five games. They once again claim the Fred Page Cup before flying to Brooks, Alberta for the National Junior A Championships where they lost to the host Brooks Bandits 4-3 in the semi-finals. Goaltender Francis Boisvert took home the tournaments MVP.

== Season-by-season record ==
Note: GP = Games Played, W = Wins, L = Losses, T = Ties, OTL = Overtime Losses, GF = Goals for, GA = Goals against

Season	GP	W	L	T	OTL	GF	GA	Points	Finish	Playoffs
1979-80	50	22	21	7	-	270	219	51	4th CJHL	
1980-81	50	12	31	7	-	200	260	31	6th CJHL	
1981-82	49	33	14	2	-	254	203	68	1st CJHL	
1982-83	48	30	11	7	-	263	189	67	1st CJHL	Won League
1983-84	54	26	21	7	-	283	284	59	3rd CJHL	
1984-85	54	23	31	0	0	252	292	46	4th CJHL	
1985-86	60	27	26	0	7	310	303	61	5th CJHL	
1986-87	54	24	21	4	5	215	236	57	4th CJHL	
1987-88	56	44	12	0	0	336	195	88	1st CJHL	
1988-89	56	33	23	0	0	282	261	66	4th CJHL	
1989-90	55	21	29	3	2	245	290	47	6th CJHL	
1990-91	54	30	19	1	4	244	224	65	4th CJHL	
1991-92	57	48	9	0	0	386	179	96	1st CJHL	
1992-93	57	41	8	4	4	433	272	90	1st CJHL	Won League
1993-94	57	31	23	3	1	284	251	66	5th CJHL	
1994-95	54	26	21	3	4	260	240	58	6th CJHL	
1995-96	54	35	17	2	0	237	228	72	2nd CJHL	
1996-97	54	29	18	7	0	156	161	65	3rd CJHL	
1997-98	56	15	30	8	3	156	220	41	9th CJHL	
1998-99	54	26	26	2	0	209	227	54	7th CJHL	
1999-00	56	32	21	3	0	234	202	67	4th CJHL	
2000-01	55	37	14	4	0	247	137	78	2nd CJHL	
2001-02	55	31	11	10	3	237	169	75	3rd CJHL	Won League
2002-03	55	20	27	6	2	268	308	48	8th CJHL	
2003-04	55	14	39	0	2	182	278	30	9th CJHL	
2004-05	57	20	25	4	8	166	231	42	9th CJHL	
2005–06	57	30	20	4	3	226	203	67	2nd East	Lost quarter-final
2006–07	55	29	20	4	2	181	178	64	1st East	Lost quarter-final
2007–08	60	12	43	2	3	148	298	29	11th CJHL	Did not qualify
2008-09	60	30	23	-	7	194	201	67	6th CJHL	Lost semi-final
2009-10	62	33	24	-	5	216	204	71	5th CJHL	Lost semi-final
2010-11	62	26	29	-	7	207	215	59	9th CCHL	Did not qualify
2011-12	62	33	26	-	3	221	192	69	7th CCHL	Lost quarter-final
2012-13	62	40	16	-	6	220	175	86	1st CCHL	Lost semi-final
2013-14	62	39	20	-	3	259	185	81	1st of 6 East; 3rd of 12 CCHL	Won quarterfinals, 4-1 (Colts); Lost semifinals, 3-4 (Bears)
2014-15	62	44	13	4	1	244	147	93	1st of 6 East; 2nd of 12 CCHL	Won quarterfinals, 4-0 (Rangers); Lost semifinals, 3-4 (Lumber Kings)
2015-16	62	44	14	4	4	215	153	96	1st of 6 East; 2nd of 12 CCHL	Won quarterfinals, 4-1 (73's); Won semifinals 4-2 (Hawks); Lost CCHL Finals, 3-4 (Canadians)
2016-17	62	41	18	1	2	203	159	85	1st of 6 East; 3rd of 12 CCHL	Won quarterfinals, 4-1 (Bears); Won semifinals, 4-0 (Colts); Lost CCHL Finals 1-4 (Canadians)
2017-18	62	46	9	5	2	254	192	99	1st of 6 East; 2nd of 12 CCHL	Won quarterfinals, 4-2 (Lumber Kings); Won semifinals 4-3 (Braves); Won CCHL Finals 4-1 (Canadians); Advance to Fred Page Cup
2018-19	62	43	16	0	3	234	154	89	1st of 6 East; 2nd of 12 CCHL	Won quarterfinals, 4-1 (Lasers); Won semifinals 4-0 (Braves); Won CCHL Finals 4-1 (Canadians); Advance to Fred Page Cup
2019-20	62	34	25	3	0	207	175	76	3rd of 6 East; 6th of 12 CCHL	Playoffs Cancelled
2020-21	Season cancelled due to covid-19 pandemic restrictions									
2021-22	55	43	8	2	2	227	137	90	1st of 6 East; 1st of 12 CCHL	Won quarterfinals, 4-1 (Bears); Won semifinals 4-1 (Wolves); Won CCHL Finals 4-0 (Hawks); Advance to Fred Page Cup
2022-23	55	48	8	3	2	218	126	89	1st of 6 East; 1st of 12 CCHL	Won quarterfinals, 4-1 (Colts); Won semifinals 4-1 (Braves); Won CCHL Finals 4-3 (Bears); Advance to Fred Page Cup
2023-24	55	24	28	3	0	146	172	51	5th of 6 East; 10th of 12 CCHL	Did not qualify
2024-25	55	26	28	1	0	169	186	53	5th of 6 Yzerman; 10th of 12 CCHL	Did not qualify
2025-26	55	36	15	2	2	184	142	76	2nd of 6 Yzerman; 3rd of 12 CCHL	Won quarterfinals, 4-1 (Wolves); Lost semifinals 4-1 (Bears)

== Attendance ==
As of March 8, 2025

Season	Games	Total	Average
2006–07	31	4,371	141
2007–08	31	4,092	132
2008–09	31	5,425	175
2009–10	31	5,363	173
2010–11	31	5,239	169
2011–12	31	4,247	137
2012–13	31	5,301	171
2013–14	31	5,518	178
2014–15	31	5,611	181
2015–16	31	5,704	184
2016–17	31	5,549	179
2017–18	27	5,155	191
2018–19	28	5,792	207
2019–20	28	5,390	193
2020–21	DID NOT PLAY DUE TO COVID-19 PANDEMIC		
2021–22	25	5,133	205
2022–23	27	3,670	136
2023–24	27	3,436	127
2024–25	27	3,583	133

== Fred Page Cup ==
Eastern Canada Championships
MHL - QAAAJHL - CCHL - Host
Round robin play with 2nd vs 3rd in semi-final to advance against 1st in the finals.

Year	Round Robin	Record	Standing	Semifinal	Gold Medal Game
2002	W, Truro Bearcats 6-0; L, Halifax Oland Exports 3-6; L, Valleyfield Braves 7-8	1-2-0	2nd of 4	W, Valleyfield Braves ?-?	L Halifax Oland Exports 3-4; Halifax RBC Hosts-advance as FPC reps
2018	W, Edmundston Blizzard 4-1; W, Carleton Place Canadians 3-2; 2OTW, Longueuil College Francais 3-2	2-1-0-0	1st of 4	n/a	W, Longueuil College Francais 10-1; Fred Page Cup Champions
2019	W, Amherst Ramblers 4-1; OTL, Princeville Titans 4-3; W, Yarmouth Mariners 5-2	2-0-1-0	2nd of 4	W, Amherst Ramblers 4-3	W, Princeville Titans 9-2; Fred Page Cup Champions

  - 2022 Fred Page Cup eliminated - league champion goes directly to National Finals (Centennial Cup).

== Royal Bank Cup ==
Canadian Jr. A National Championships
Dudley Hewitt Champions – Central, Fred Page Champions – Eastern, Doyle Cup Champion – Pacific, ANAVET Cup Champion – Western, and Host
Round-robin play with top four in semifinal games and winners to finals.

Year	Round-robin	Record	Standing	Semifinal	Gold medal game
2002	W, Rayside-Balfour Sabrecats (Central) 4–3; OTL, OCN Blizzard (Western) 3–4; L, Halifax Exports (Host) 1–2; L, Chilliwack Chiefs (Pacific) 3–5	1–3	4th of 5	L, Halifax Exports 7–9	—
2018	OTW, Wellington Dukes (Central) 2–1; OTL, Chilliwack Chiefs (Host) 3–4; OTL, Wenatchee Wild (Pacific) 2–3; OTL, Steinbach Pistons (Western) 5–4	0–2–2–0	3rd of 5	L, Chilliwack Chiefs 2–3	—
2019	W, Portage Terriers (Western) 3–0; L, Prince George Spruce Kings (Pacific) 0–4; L, Brooks Bandits (Host) 1–2; L, Oakville Blades (Central) 4–7	1–3–0–0	4th of 5	L, Brooks Bandits 3–4	—

== Centennial Cup - Revised format 2022 ==
Canadian Jr. A National Championships
Maritime Junior Hockey League, Quebec Junior Hockey League, Central Canada Hockey League, Ontario Junior Hockey League, Northern Ontario Junior Hockey League, Superior International Junior Hockey League, Manitoba Junior Hockey League, Saskatchewan Junior Hockey League, Alberta Junior Hockey League, and Host. The BCHL declared itself an independent league and there is no BC representative.
Round-robin play in two 5-team pools with top three in pool advancing to determine a Champion.

Year	Round-robin	Record	Standing	Quarterfinal	Semifinal	Championship
2022	L, Dauphin Kings (ManJHL), 1-2; OTL, Flin Flon Bomers (SJHL), 2-3; W, Soo Thunderbirds (NOJHL), 4-0; OTL, Summerside Western Capitals (MarJHL), 3-4	1-0-1-2	4th of 5 Pool B	did not qualified	did not qualified	did not qualified
2023	OTW, Terrebonne Cobras (LQJH), 2-1; L, Brooks Bandits (AJHL), 1-5; W, Yarmouth Mariners (MarJHL), 4-3; OTL, Timmins Rock (NOJHL), 1-2	1-1-1-1	2nd of 5 Pool A	Won 4-2; Collingwood Blues	Lost 0-3; Brooks Bandits	did not qualified

== Championships ==
CJHL Bogart Cup Championships: 1983, 1993, 2002, 2018, 2019, 2022, 2023
Eastern Canadian Fred Page Cup Championships: 2000, 2018, 2019
CJAHL Royal Bank Cup Championships: None

== Notable alumni ==
- Peter Ambroziak
- David Appleby
- Eric Beaudoin
- Brendan Bell
- Alain Chevrier
- Dean De Fazio
- Ben Eager
- Dave Ellett
- Garry Galley
- Steve Graves
- Tim Higgins
- Alan Kuntz
- Marc Lamothe
- Guy Larose
- Peter Lee
- Charlie Luksa
- Justin Papineau
- Larry Regan
- Jamie Rivers
- Shawn Rivers
- Randy Robitaille
- Derek Smith
- Chris Therien
- Wayne Thomas
