= Central Canada Hockey League =

Junior ice hockey league

Central Canada Hockey League Ligue de hockey centrale du Canada
- Current season or competition: 2026–27 season
- Countries: Canada
- Commissioner: Ian MacInnis
- Founded: 1961
- No. of teams: 12
- Recent champions: Rockland Nationals (2026)
- Most successful club: Pembroke Lumber Kings
- Headquarters: Ottawa
- Website: thecchl.ca

The Central Canada Hockey League (CCHL; French: Ligue de hockey centrale du Canada, LHCC) is a junior ice hockey league with 12 members in Eastern Ontario.

The league was founded in 1961 as a development league by the Montreal Canadiens.

== Teams ==
Robinson Division
| Team | Arena | Joined | EOJHL Affiliate |
| Brockville Braves | Brockville Memorial Civic Centre | 1963 | Brockville Tikis |
| Carleton Place Canadians | Carleton Place Arena | 2009 | Carleton Place Jr. Canadians |
| Kemptville 73's | North Grenville Municipal Centre | 2007 |
| Pembroke Royals | Pembroke Memorial Centre | 2026 | Whitewater Kings |
| Renfrew Wolves | MyFM Centre | 2020 | Ottawa Canadians |
| Smiths Falls Bears | Smiths Falls Memorial Community Centre | 1961 | Smiths Falls Jr. Bears |
Yzerman Division
| Team | Arena | Joined | EOJHL Affiliate |
| Cornwall Colts | Cornwall Civic Complex | 1992 |
| Hawkesbury Hawks | Robert Hartley Sports Complex | 1976 |
| Navan Grads | Navan Memorial Centre | 2017 | Carleton Place Jr. Canadians |
| Nepean Raiders | Nepean Sportsplex | 1972 | Ottawa West Golden Knights / Winchester Hawks |
| Ottawa Jr. Senators | Jim Durrell Recreation Centre | 1979 | Ottawa Canadians |
| Rockland Nationals | Clarence-Rockland Arena | 2017 |

Map of CCHL teams
Robinson Division Yzerman Division

=== Timeline ===
- 1961 – Cornwall Royals join league
- 1961 – Hawkesbury Braves join league
- 1961 – Hull Hawks join league
- 1961 – Ottawa Primrose join league
- 1961 – Pembroke C & A's join league
- 1961 – Smiths Falls Bears join league
- 1962 – Ottawa Montagnards join league
- 1962 – Buckingham Castors join league
- 1962 – Pembroke C & A's become the Pembroke Ironmen
- 1963 – Brockville Braves join league
- 1964 – Pembroke Ironmen become the Pembroke Lumber Kings
- 1965 – Ottawa Primrose leave league
- 1965 – Ottawa Montagnards leave league
- 1965 – Arnprior Packers join league
- 1967 – Arnprior Packers leave league to join the Eastern Ontario Junior Hockey League
- 1967 – Buckingham Castors leave league
- 1968 – Ottawa M.&W. Rangers join league
- 1969 – Cornwall Royals leave league to join Quebec Major Junior Hockey League
- 1970 – Hawkesbury Braves leave league
- 1972 – Nepean Raiders join league from the Eastern Ontario Junior Hockey League
- 1973 – Brockville Braves become the Brockville Warriors
- 1973 – Hull Hawks leave league to join the Quebec Major Junior Hockey League
- 1973 – Ottawa M.&W. Rangers become the Gloucester Rangers
- 1973 – Rockland Nationals join league
- 1974 – Brockville Braves re-take their original name
- 1976 – Hawkesbury Hawks join league
- 1976 – Smiths Falls Bears suspends operations
- 1977 – Rockland Nationals leave league
- 1978 – Pembroke Lumber Kings are expelled from the league for failing to remain in good standing
- 1978 – Pembroke Royals join league
- 1979 – Ottawa Senators join league
- 1980 – Pembroke Lumber Kings reapply for a franchise and are accepted into the league
- 1980 – Pembroke Royals leave leave
- 1985 – Smiths Falls Bears re-join league
- 1987 – Kanata Valley Lasers join league
- 1988 – Massena Turbines join league
- 1990 – Massena Turbines become the Massena Americans
- 1991 – Cumberland Grads join league from the Eastern Ontario Junior Hockey League
- 1992 – Massena Americans relocate to Cornwall to become the Cornwall Colts to fill in the void for the Cornwall Royals, who moved to Newmarket
- 1992 – Ottawa Senators re-brand to Ottawa Jr. Senators because of new the NHL expansion team Ottawa Senators
- 2000 – Smiths Falls Bears relocate to Perth and become the Lanark Thunder
- 2002 – Kanata Valley Lasers rename to as the Kanata Stallions
- 2002 – Lanark Thunder suspends operations and team is returned to Smiths Falls as the Bears
- 2005 – Gloucester Rangers move to Orleans and become the Orleans Blues
- 2007 – Kemptville 73's join league from the Eastern Ontario Junior Hockey League
- 2008 – Orleans Blues re-become the Gloucester Rangers after league refuses permit to stay in Orleans
- 2009 – Carleton Place Canadians join league from the Eastern Ontario Junior Hockey League
- 2014 – Kanata Stallions re-brand to Kanata Lasers
- 2017 – Gloucester Rangers relocate to Clarence-Rockland and become the Rockland Nationals
- 2021 – Kanata Lasers relocate to Renfrew and become the Renfrew Wolves
- 2026 – Pembroke Lumber Kings suspended
- 2026 – Pembroke Royals joined as an expansion franchise

== League championships ==
League champions are awarded the Bogart Cup.

| Year | Champion | Runner-up |
|---|---|---|
Memorial Cup Era
| 1962 | Ottawa Primrose | Pembroke C&A's |
| 1963 | Ottawa Montagnards | Smiths Falls Bears |
| 1964 | Ottawa Primrose | Pembroke Ironmen |
| 1965 | Smiths Falls Bears | Cornwall Royals |
| 1966 | Cornwall Royals | Buckingham Castors |
| 1967 | Cornwall Royals | Smiths Falls Bears |
| 1968 | Cornwall Royals | Smiths Falls Bears |
| 1969 | Hull Castors | Pembroke Lumber Kings |
| 1970 | Ottawa M&W Rangers | Brockville Braves |
Centennial Cup Era
| 1971 | Ottawa M&W Rangers | Smiths Falls Bears |
| 1972 | Smiths Falls Bears | Ottawa M&W Rangers |
| 1973 | Pembroke Lumber Kings | Ottawa M&W Rangers |
| 1974 | Smiths Falls Bears | Pembroke Lumber Kings |
| 1975 | Smiths Falls Bears | Nepean Raiders |
| 1976 | Rockland Nationals | Gloucester Rangers |
| 1977 | Pembroke Lumber Kings | Nepean Raiders |
| 1978 | Pembroke Lumber Kings | Nepean Raiders |
| 1979 | Hawkesbury Hawks | Nepean Raiders |
| 1980 | Hawkesbury Hawks | Gloucester Rangers |
| 1981 | Gloucester Rangers | Nepean Raiders |
| 1982 | Pembroke Lumber Kings | Ottawa Jr. Senators |
| 1983 | Ottawa Jr. Senators | Pembroke Lumber Kings |
| 1984 | Pembroke Lumber Kings | Gloucester Rangers |
| 1985 | Pembroke Lumber Kings | Brockville Braves |
| 1986 | Brockville Braves | Pembroke Lumber Kings |
| 1987 | Pembroke Lumber Kings |
| 1988 | Pembroke Lumber Kings |
| 1989 | Pembroke Lumber Kings |
| 1990 | Hawkesbury Hawks |
| 1991 | Hawkesbury Hawks |
| 1992 | Kanata Valley Lasers |
| 1993 | Ottawa Jr. Senators |
| 1994 | Gloucester Rangers |
| 1995 | Cornwall Colts | Ottawa Jr. Senators |
| 1996 | Cornwall Colts | Gloucester Rangers |
| 1997 | Kanata Valley Lasers |
| 1998 | Brockville Braves | Cornwall Colts |
| 1999 | Hawkesbury Hawks | Brockville Braves |
| 2000 | Cornwall Colts | Brockville Braves |
| 2001 | Cornwall Colts | Ottawa Jr. Senators |
| 2002 | Ottawa Jr. Senators | Cornwall Colts |
| 2003 | Nepean Raiders | Ottawa Jr. Senators |
| 2004 | Nepean Raiders | Gloucester Rangers |
| 2005 | Hawkesbury Hawks | Nepean Raiders |
| 2006 | Hawkesbury Hawks | Nepean Raiders |
| 2007 | Pembroke Lumber Kings | Nepean Raiders |
| 2008 | Pembroke Lumber Kings | Smiths Falls Bears |
| 2009 | Pembroke Lumber Kings | Nepean Raiders |
| 2010 | Pembroke Lumber Kings | Brockville Braves |
| 2011 | Pembroke Lumber Kings | Cornwall Colts |
| 2012 | Nepean Raiders | Cornwall Colts |
| 2013 | Cornwall Colts | Nepean Raiders |
| 2014 | Carleton Place Canadians | Smiths Falls Bears |
| 2015 | Carleton Place Canadians | Pembroke Lumber Kings |
| 2016 | Carleton Place Canadians | Ottawa Jr. Senators |
| 2017 | Carleton Place Canadians | Ottawa Jr. Senators |
| 2018 | Ottawa Jr. Senators | Carleton Place Canadians |
| 2019 | Ottawa Jr. Senators | Carleton Place Canadians |
| 2020 | Season cancelled |
| 2021 | Season cancelled |
| 2022 | Ottawa Jr. Senators | Hawkesbury Hawks |
| 2023 | Ottawa Jr. Senators | Smiths Falls Bears |
| 2024 | Navan Grads | Smiths Falls Bears |
| 2025 | Rockland Nationals | Carleton Place Canadians |
| 2026 | Rockland Nationals | Smiths Falls Bears |

== Regional championships ==
| Year | Champion | Finalist | Host (if applicable) |
|---|---|---|---|
Eastern Centennial Cup Semi-final
| 1973 | Pembroke Lumber Kings | Chatham Maroons (SOJHL) | -- |
| 1974 | Smiths Falls Bears | Charlottetown Colonels (IJHL) | -- |
| 1975 | Smiths Falls Bears | St. Jerome Cyclones (QJAHL) | -- |
| 1976 | Rockland Nationals | Guelph Platers (SOJHL) | -- |
| 1977 | Pembroke Lumber Kings | North York Rangers (OPJHL) | -- |
Dudley Hewitt Cup
| 1987 | Pembroke Lumber Kings | Nickel Centre Power Trains (NOJHL) | -- |
| 1988 | Pembroke Lumber Kings | Thunder Bay Flyers (USHL) | -- |
Fred Page Cup
| 1997 | Kanata Valley Lasers | Longueuil Collège Français (QPJHL) | Brockville, Ontario |
| 1998 | Brockville Braves | Restigouche River Rats (MJAHL) | Joliette, Quebec |
| 2000 | Cornwall Colts | Halifax Oland Exports (MJAHL) | Pembroke, Ontario |
| 2004 | Nepean Raiders | Valleyfield Braves (QJAAAHL) | Valleyfield, Quebec |
| 2005 | Hawkesbury Hawks | Yarmouth Mariners (MJAHL) | Yarmouth, Nova Scotia |
| 2007 | Pembroke Lumber Kings | St-Jérôme Panthers (QJAAAHL) | Saint-Jérôme, Quebec |
| 2010 | Brockville Braves | Pembroke Lumber Kings | Brockville, Ontario |
| 2011 | Pembroke Lumber Kings | Longueuil College Francais (QJAAAHL) | Terrebonne, Quebec |
| 2014 | Carleton Place Canadians | St-Jérôme Panthers (QJAAAHL) | Saint-Jérôme, Quebec |
| 2015 | Carleton Place Canadians | Dieppe Commandos (MJAHL) | Cornwall, Ontario |
| 2016 | Carleton Place Canadians | Woodstock Slammers (MJAHL) | Woodstock, New Brunswick |
| 2018 | Ottawa Jr. Senators | Longueuil College Francais (QJAAAHL) | Ottawa, Ontario |
| 2019 | Ottawa Jr. Senators | Princeville Titans (QJAAAHL) | Amherst, Nova Scotia |

== National championships ==
| Year | Champion | Finalist | Host (if applicable) |
|---|---|---|---|
| 1976 | Rockland Nationals | Spruce Grove Mets (AJHL) | -- |
| 2011 | Pembroke Lumber Kings | Vernon Vipers (BCHL) | Camrose, Alberta |

== Notable alumni ==
CCHL alumni who have played played in the NHL:

- Brendan Bell (Ottawa Jr. Senators)
- Mark Borowiecki (Smiths Falls Bears)
- Dan Boyle (Gloucester Rangers)
- Matt Bradley (Cumberland Grads)
- Fred Brathwaite (Smiths Falls Bears)
- Grant Clitsome (Nepean Raiders)
- Shean Donovan (Kanata Stallions)
- Ben Eager (Ottawa Jr. Senators)
- Claude Giroux (Cumberland Grads)
- Jimmy Howard (Kanata Valley Lasers)
- Kent Huskins (Kanata Stallions)
- Jon Matsumoto (Cumberland Grads)
- Marc Methot (Kanata Valley Lasers)
- Sean O'Donnell (Kanata Stallions)
- Benoit Pouliot (Hawkesbury Hawks)
- Darroll Powe (Kanata Stallions)
- Larry Robinson (Brockville Braves)
- Patrick Sharp (Kanata Valley Lasers)
- Wayne Simmonds (Brockville Braves)
- Martin St. Louis (Hawksbury Hawks)
- Martin St. Pierre (Hawkesbury Hawks)
- Billy Smith (Smiths Falls Bears)
- Todd White (Kanata Stallions)
- Jesse Winchester (Cornwall Colts)
- Stephane Yelle (Cumberland Grads)
- Steve Yzerman (Nepean Raiders)

== David Frost incident ==
David Frost, the agent of former St. Louis Blues player Mike Danton, was banned from all CJHL games and events in fall 2005 after Frost entered an off-limits-to-fans area at the Jim Peplinski Arena, in which Frost "accosted, harassed and threatened an official of the CJHL". League commissioner Mac MacLean stated "We don't want him around period". The Lumber Kings were fined $1,000 for David Frost's actions, because the league considered Frost to be associated with owner Sheldon Keefe. MacLean sent posters to each league arena to help security staff identify Frost if he were to show up at games, and to refuse entry to Frost. Weeks later, the ban was lifted after Mac MacLean was relieved of his duties of CJHL commissioner. Newly appointed commissioner John Comerford lifted the ban, stating "We can't stop David Frost from entering the rink and I haven't received any complaints from anybody about him". David Frost had no affiliation with the Lumber Kings organization, but was allowed to attend league games and was barred from restricted areas. Frost disregarded the advisement not to enter restricted areas, and was seen getting off the Lumber Kings team bus by CBC Fifth Estate film crew, and was filmed following the team to a dressing room during a playoff game in Nepean. At the end of the season, Frost severed un-affiliated ties with the league and informed that he would not attend any more league games or events.

== Sources ==
- Dixon, Anthony (9 December 2025). "Pembroke Lumber Kings' coach and GM hit with extended suspension". Pembroke Observer & News. Postmedia.
- Dixon, Anthony (16 April 2026). "Alex Armstrong officially removed as Pembroke Lumber Kings owner". Pembroke Observer & News. Postmedia.
- "Ontario Superior Court Refuses to Reinstate Former Member of the CCHL; League Welcomes New Member in Pembroke". thecchl.ca (Press release). Central Canada Hockey League. 31 July 2026.
- Dyson, Dylan (14 September 2026). "Pembroke's junior hockey team changes name to 'Royals' for new season". CTVNews. Bell Media.
- "Hockey Town welcomes the Pembroke Royals to the 2026–27 season". 104.9 Pembroke Today. 4 August 2026.
- Dixon, Anthony (25 September 2026). "Pembroke, Royals reach agreement to bring CCHL hockey to PMC". tj.news. Postmedia.
