= 1996–97 MetJHL season =

- League: Metro Junior A Hockey League
- Sport: Hockey
- Duration: Regular season 1996-09 – 1997-02; Playoffs; 1997-02 – 1997-05
- Number of teams: 16
- Finals champions: Aurora Tigers

MetJHL seasons
- ← 1995–96 1997–98 →

The 1996–97 MetJHL season is the 6th season of the Metro Junior A Hockey League (MetJHL). The 16 teams of the Central, Eastern, and Western Divisions competed in a 50-game schedule. The top 12 teams made the playoffs.

The winner of the MetJHL playoffs, the Aurora Tigers, could not move into national playdowns as the Metro was not a member of the Ontario Hockey Association.

== Milestones ==
On February 21, 1997, the Muskoka Bears' Ryan Venturelli became the first known goaltender in hockey history to score two goals (both empty net) in a hockey game against the Durham Huskies during the Metro Junior A Hockey League 1996-97 regular season.

== Changes ==
- League switches from 2 divisions to 3, adding Central Division
- Durham Huskies, Quinte Hawks, Syracuse Jr. Crunch, and Port Hope Buzzards join the MetJHL
- Shelburne Hornets become Shelburne Wolves

== Final standings ==
Note: GP = Games played; W = Wins; L = Losses; OTL = Overtime losses; SL = Shootout losses; GF = Goals for; GA = Goals against; PTS = Points; x = clinched playoff berth; y = clinched division title; z = clinched conference title

Central Division
Team	GP	W	L	T	GF	GA	P
Wexford Raiders	50	38	7	5	285	185	81
Thornhill Islanders	50	29	17	4	279	195	62
Markham Waxers	50	27	19	4	246	221	58
Niagara Scenic	50	17	26	7	230	262	41
North York Rangers	50	12	33	5	248	341	29
Eastern Division
Team	GP	W	L	T	GF	GA	P
Pickering Panthers	50	34	12	4	232	163	72
Quinte Hawks	50	34	13	3	280	143	71
Wellington Dukes	50	21	26	3	212	224	45
Oshawa Legionaires	50	20	30	0	231	292	40
Port Hope Buzzards	50	13	35	2	162	269	28
Syracuse Jr. Crunch	50	10	37	3	220	358	23
Western Division
Team	GP	W	L	T	GF	GA	P
Aurora Tigers	50	42	5	3	342	138	87
Caledon Canadians	50	41	7	2	318	145	84
Muskoka Bears	50	14	34	2	200	298	30
Durham Huskies	50	13	37	0	201	317	26
Shelburne Wolves	50	10	37	3	213	348	23

== 1996-97 MetJHL Playoffs ==
Division Semi-final

Wexford Raiders defeated Niagara Scenics 4-games-to-none
Thornhill Islanders defeated Markham Waxers 4-games-to-3
Pickering Panthers defeated Oshawa Legionaires 4-games-to-2
Quinte Hawks defeated Wellington Dukes 4-games-to-1
Aurora Tigers defeated Durham Huskies 4-games-to-none
Caledon Canadians defeated Muskoka Bears 4-games-to-none

Interdivision Round Robin

Team	W	L	T	GF	GA	P
x-Wexford Raiders	4	2	0	39	31	8
x-Aurora Tigers	4	2	0	23	18	8
x-Quinte Hawks	4	2	0	29	22	8
x-Caledon Canadians	3	2	1	37	18	7
Thornhill Islanders	2	4	0	24	31	4
Pickering Panthers	0	5	1	14	46	1

Semi-final

Caledon Canadians defeated Wexford Raiders 4-games-to-none
Aurora Tigers defeated Quinte Hawks 4-games-to-2

Final

Aurora Tigers defeated Caledon Canadians 4-games-to-none

== Scoring leaders ==
Note: GP = Games played; G = Goals; A = Assists; Pts = Points; PIM = Penalty minutes

Player	Team	GP	G	A	Pts	PIM
Peter Bournazakis	Aurora Tigers	49	52	80	132	112
Brian Gionta	Niagara Scenic	50	57	70	127	101
John Rumeo	Wexford Raiders	50	52	62	114	--
Brad Tapper	Wexford Raiders	50	42	70	112	--
Matt Murley	Syracuse Jr. Crunch	48	52	58	110	--
Tim Connolly	Syracuse Jr. Crunch	50	42	62	104	34
Sean Klaver	Aurora Tigers	48	41	63	104	51
Ian Laroque	Quinte Hawks	44	45	55	100	--
Andy Korzen	Niagara Scenic	45	41	58	99	22
David Inman	Wexford Raiders	43	32	56	88	--

== Leading goaltenders ==
Starting goaltenders only (1000 minutes or over).

Note: GP = Games played; Mins = Minutes played; W = Wins; L = Losses: OTL = Overtime losses; SL = Shootout losses; GA = Goals Allowed; SO = Shutouts; GAA = Goals against average

Player	Team	GP	Mins	GA	SO	GAA
Jeff Mound	Aurora Tigers	29	1731	72	5	2.50
Jason Flick	Quinte Hawks	30	1774	81	1	2.74
Lyle Zulak	Caledon Canadians	27	1380	65	2	2.83
Daniel Jacques	Pickering Panthers	28	1481	70	1	2.84
Corey Batten	Quinte Hawks	19	1125	55	2	2.93

== See also ==
- 1997 Royal Bank Cup
- Dudley Hewitt Cup
- List of Ontario Hockey Association Junior A seasons
- Ontario Junior A Hockey League
- Northern Ontario Junior Hockey League
- 1996 in ice hockey
- 1997 in ice hockey

Preceded by 1995–96 MetJHL season	Ontario Hockey Association; Junior A seasons	Succeeded by 1997–98 MetJHL season
