= Kivelä =

Kivelä is a Finnish surname. Notable people with the surname include:

- Birger Kivelä (1920–2013), Finnish diver
- Eero Kivelä (1930–2026), Finnish sprinter
- Antero Kivelä (born 1955), Finnish ice hockey goaltender
- John Kivela (1969–2013), American politician
- Sami Kivelä (born 1979), Finnish comic book artist
- Mai Kivelä (born 1982), Finnish human rights activist and feminist
- Oona Kivelä (born 1983), Finnish professional acrobat
- Heidi Kivelä (born 1988), Finnish football midfielder
- Aki Kivelä (born 1992), Finnish ice hockey player
