= Alyn McCauley =

Canadian ice hockey player

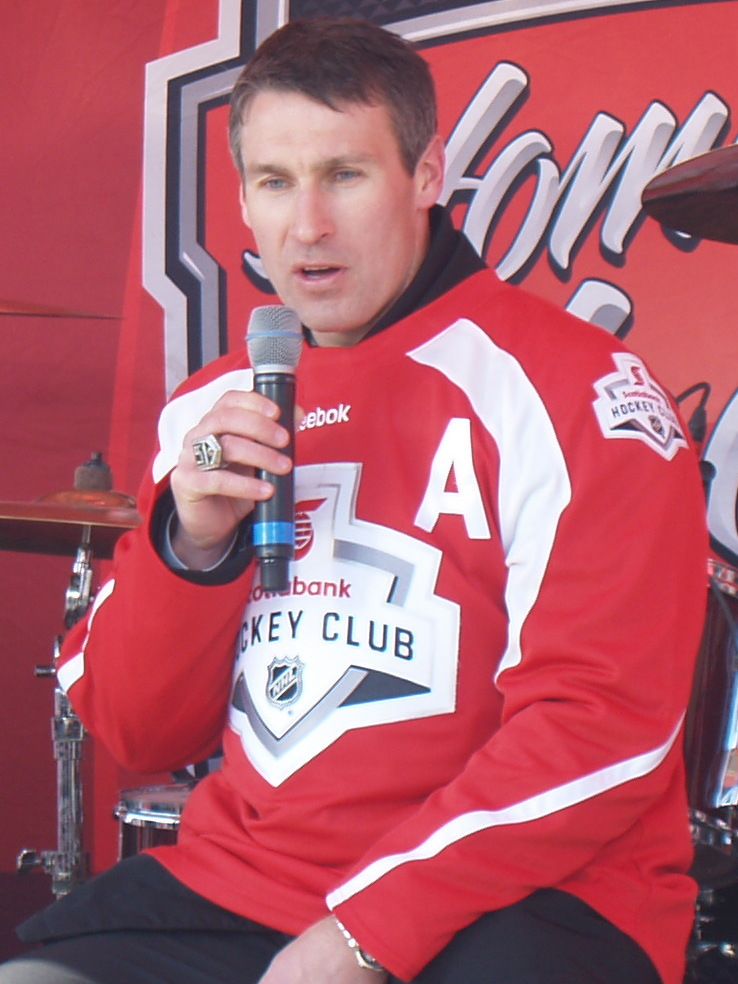
- McCauley in 2015
- Born: May 29, 1977 (age 49) Gananoque, Ontario, Canada
- Height: 5 ft 11 in (180 cm)
- Weight: 200 lb (91 kg; 14 st 4 lb)
- Position: Centre
- Shot: Left
- Played for: Toronto Maple Leafs; San Jose Sharks; Los Angeles Kings
- NHL draft: 79th overall, 1995; New Jersey Devils
- Playing career: 1997–2007

Alyn Daniel McCauley (born May 29, 1977) is a Canadian former professional ice hockey player who played in the National Hockey League (NHL) for ten years with the Toronto Maple Leafs, San Jose Sharks, and the Los Angeles Kings. Prior to his NHL career, McCauley was named CHL Player of the Year for 1996–97 while a member of the Ottawa 67's. McCauley was born in Brockville, Ontario, but grew up in Gananoque, Ontario. On February 3, 2022, he was named Director of Player Personnel for the Philadelphia Flyers.

== Junior career ==
McCauley was a junior hockey superstar with the Ontario Hockey League (OHL)'s Ottawa 67's. At the age of 16, McCauley earned a roster spot with the 67's and enjoyed a highly successful four-year career with the club which culminated with his being named CHL Player of the Year for 1996–97. He was also a First Team All-Star in 1996 and 1997 and represented Canada at the 1996 and 1997 World Junior Ice Hockey Championships, winning gold medals on both occasions. Prior to these two outstanding seasons in Ottawa, McCauley was selected in the fourth round of the 1995 NHL entry draft, 79th overall by the New Jersey Devils, though he would never play with the team. Brian Kilrea, the long-time head coach of the 67's, once called McCauley the best player he had ever coached.

Several concussions almost ended McCauley's promising career before he had ever played a single NHL game, including one which sidelined him for about half of the 1998–99 season.

== NHL career ==
On February 25, 1997, the New Jersey Devils dealt McCauley, along with Jason Smith and Steve Sullivan, to the rebuilding Toronto Maple Leafs in exchange for Doug Gilmour, Dave Ellett, and New Jersey's 3rd round choice in 1999. McCauley was used primarily as a defensive forward in his rookie season in Toronto and was limited to just six goals and 16 points. Concussion issues continued to plague him as a pro, and these injuries deeply affected his contributions on the ice. By 2000–01, he found himself in the minors with the American Hockey League (AHL)'s St. John's Maple Leafs, though he was called up to Toronto for the playoffs.

By the start of 2001–02, McCauley earned a roster spot in Toronto and was a key contributor for the Maple Leafs all season long, managing to stay injury-free. Though no longer the offensive force he had been as a junior player, he had become a solid two-way performer. However, during the playoffs, his offensive touch rebounded significantly. He rose in the Maple Leafs lineup, getting more ice time after an injury to Mats Sundin in game three against the New York Islanders. Following the injury to Sundin, he recorded six assists in the final four games in the series against the Islanders, as well as seven points in the final four games against the Ottawa Senators in the second round. In total he had 15 points in 20 playoff games, one less than his 16-point total in 82 games during the regular season.

On March 5, 2003, Toronto traded McCauley, Brad Boyes, and Toronto's first round choice in 2003 to the San Jose Sharks, with power forward Owen Nolan going to Toronto in exchange. The change of scenery seemed to benefit McCauley. In his first full season with the Sharks in 2003–04, he established career highs in goals (20) and points (47). McCauley was known for his two-way play and his penalty-killing abilities, which earned him a Selke Trophy nomination in 2003–04 as the league's best defensive forward.

After three seasons in San Jose, McCauley signed as a free agent with the division rival Los Angeles Kings in July 2006. He missed the majority of 2006–07 season recovering from a recurring knee injury, and ultimately played in only 10 games in Los Angeles, scoring one goal.

== Other ==
During the 2004–05 NHL lockout, McCauley studied at Athabasca University.

On August 15, 2008, McCauley accepted a position as an assistant coach with the Queen's Golden Gaels men's hockey team.

McCauley has served as a pro scout for the Los Angeles Kings, with whom he received Stanley Cup rings in 2012 and 2014. From 2018 to 2022, he was a pro scout with the Philadelphia Flyers, and on February 3, 2022, he was named their director of player personnel.

== Awards ==
- OHL First All-Star Team (1996, 1997)
- Red Tilson Trophy (OHL MVP) (1996, 1997)
- CHL First All-Star Team (1997)
- CHL Player of the Year (1997)

== Career statistics ==
=== Regular season and playoffs ===
			Regular season					Playoffs
Season	Team	League	GP	G	A	Pts	PIM	GP	G	A	Pts	PIM
1991–92	Kingston Voyageurs	MetJHL	37	5	17	22	6	—	—	—	—	—
1992–93	Kingston Voyageurs	MetJHL	38	31	29	60	18	—	—	—	—	—
1993–94	Ottawa 67's	OHL	38	13	23	36	10	13	5	14	19	4
1994–95	Ottawa 67's	OHL	65	16	38	54	20	—	—	—	—	—
1995–96	Ottawa 67's	OHL	55	34	48	82	24	2	0	0	0	0
1996–97	Ottawa 67's	OHL	50	56	56	112	16	22	14	22	36	14
1997–98	St. John's Maple Leafs	AHL	—	—	—	—	—	3	0	1	1	0
1997–98	Toronto Maple Leafs	NHL	60	6	10	16	6	—	—	—	—	—
1998–99	Toronto Maple Leafs	NHL	39	9	15	24	2	—	—	—	—	—
1999–2000	St. John's Maple Leafs	AHL	5	1	1	2	0	—	—	—	—	—
1999–2000	Toronto Maple Leafs	NHL	45	5	5	10	10	5	0	0	0	6
2000–01	St. John's Maple Leafs	AHL	47	16	28	44	12	—	—	—	—	—
2000–01	Toronto Maple Leafs	NHL	14	1	0	1	0	10	0	0	0	2
2001–02	Toronto Maple Leafs	NHL	82	6	10	16	18	20	5	10	15	4
2002–03	Toronto Maple Leafs	NHL	64	6	9	15	16	—	—	—	—	—
2002–03	San Jose Sharks	NHL	16	3	7	10	4	—	—	—	—	—
2003–04	San Jose Sharks	NHL	82	20	27	47	28	11	2	1	3	2
2005–06	San Jose Sharks	NHL	76	12	14	26	30	6	0	1	1	4
2006–07	Los Angeles Kings	NHL	10	1	0	1	2	—	—	—	—	—
NHL totals			488	69	97	166	116	52	7	12	19	18

=== International ===
Year	Team	Event	Results	GP	G	A	Pts	PIM
1996	Canada	WJC	1st place, gold medalist(s)	6	2	3	5	2
1997	Canada	WJC	1st place, gold medalist(s)	7	0	5	5	2
Junior totals				13	2	8	10	4

Preceded by Vincent Damphousse	San Jose Sharks captain 2003–04; 10 games	Succeeded by Patrick Marleau
Preceded by Christian Dubé	CHL Player of the Year; 1997	Succeeded by Sergei Varlamov
