= Mähönen =

Surname list

Mähönen or Mahonen is a surname. Notable people with the surname include:

- Krister Mähönen (born 1992), Finnish ice hockey player
- Michael Mahonen (born 1964), Canadian actor, director, and screenwriter
- Raimo Mähönen (born 1938), Finnish politician
