= Nick Boynton =

Canadian ice hockey player (born 1979)

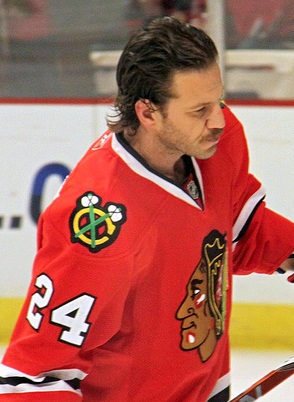
- Boynton with the Chicago Blackhawks in December 2010
- Born: January 14, 1979 (age 47) Nobleton, Ontario, Canada
- Height: 6 ft 2 in (188 cm)
- Weight: 218 lb (99 kg; 15 st 8 lb)
- Position: Defence
- Shot: Right
- Played for: Boston Bruins; Nottingham Panthers; Phoenix Coyotes; Florida Panthers; Anaheim Ducks; Chicago Blackhawks; Philadelphia Flyers
- NHL draft: 9th overall, 1997; Washington Capitals; 21st overall, 1999; Boston Bruins
- Playing career: 1999–2011

Nicholas Carl Boynton (born January 14, 1979) is a Canadian former professional ice hockey defenceman who played 11 seasons in the National Hockey League (NHL) for the Boston Bruins, Phoenix Coyotes, Florida Panthers, Anaheim Ducks, Chicago Blackhawks and Philadelphia Flyers. Boynton was most recently the color analyst for the Arizona Coyotes radio broadcasts.

== Playing career ==
Boynton grew up playing minor hockey in his hometown of Nobleton, Ontario, with the NobleKing Knights. He played in the 1992 Quebec International Pee-Wee Hockey Tournament with the Richmond Hill-Vaughan Kings minor ice hockey team. He played bantam AAA with the Kings before signing as a 15-year-old with the Caledon Canadians Jr. A. club of the Metro Junior Hockey League in 1994–95. He was a standout for four seasons with the OHL's Ottawa 67's, finishing his junior career in 1998–99 with 59 points in 51 games.

Boynton was originally drafted by the Washington Capitals in the 1997 NHL entry draft. After failing to come to terms on a contract with the Capitals, Boynton was eligible to return to the draft, and he was subsequently selected in the 1999 NHL entry draft by the Boston Bruins. Boynton played for the Bruins until 2005–06.

His best season was 2003–04 when he registered 30 points. During the NHL lockout season of 2004–05, Boynton played for the Nottingham Panthers in the British Elite Ice Hockey League, memorably scoring the equalizing goal in the British Championship Grand Final. On June 26, 2006, he was traded to the Phoenix Coyotes in exchange for fellow defenceman Paul Mara.

After two seasons with the Coyotes Boynton was traded at the 2008 NHL entry draft along with Keith Ballard and a second-round pick to the Florida Panthers for Olli Jokinen on June 20, 2008. In the 2008-09 season, Boynton regained his scoring touch and posted 21 points in 68 games for the Panthers. During the season on February 27, 2009, Boynton was sent home from a Panthers road trip and missed three games for disciplinary reasons, later revealed to be after an argument with coach Peter DeBoer.

On July 9, 2009, he signed a one-year contract with the Anaheim Ducks for the 2009-10 season. After playing in 42 games with the Ducks. Boynton was placed on waivers on February 1, 2010. He was then assigned to the Manitoba Moose of the AHL.

On March 2, 2010, he was traded to the Chicago Blackhawks, he was then assigned to AHL affiliate, the Rockford IceHogs. Boynton was later recalled to the Blackhawks and made his debut in a 4–2 loss to the Ducks on March 17, 2010. On June 9, 2010, he won his first Stanley Cup with the Chicago Blackhawks.

On February 26, 2011, Boynton was claimed off of waivers by the Philadelphia Flyers, with whom he played ten games to conclude the 2010–11 season. He retired after the season.

== Personal life ==
Boynton married for the first time on August 3, 2012, to former Chicago media personality Jen Boynton (formerly Jen Patterson). Boynton and his wife have two children together. Boynton also has two daughters from a previous relationship.

Shortly before his first NHL training camp, Boynton was diagnosed with Type I Diabetes, but the condition did not affect his ability to play hockey.

Boynton has spoken about the mental and emotional aspects and repercussions of playing hockey in the NHL.

== Career statistics ==
			Regular season					Playoffs
Season	Team	League	GP	G	A	Pts	PIM	GP	G	A	Pts	PIM
1993–94	Caledon Canadians	MetJHL	4	0	1	1	0	—	—	—	—	—
1994–95	Caledon Canadians	MetJHL	44	10	35	45	139	—	—	—	—	—
1995–96	Ottawa 67's	OHL	64	10	14	24	90	4	0	3	3	10
1996–97	Ottawa 67's	OHL	63	13	51	64	143	24	4	24	28	38
1997–98	Ottawa 67's	OHL	40	7	31	38	94	13	0	4	4	24
1998–99	Ottawa 67's	OHL	51	11	48	59	83	9	1	9	10	18
1999–2000	Providence Bruins	AHL	53	5	14	19	66	12	1	0	1	6
1999–2000	Boston Bruins	NHL	5	0	0	0	0	—	—	—	—	—
2000–01	Providence Bruins	AHL	78	6	27	33	105	17	0	2	2	35
2000–01	Boston Bruins	NHL	1	0	0	0	0	—	—	—	—	—
2001–02	Boston Bruins	NHL	80	4	14	18	107	6	1	2	3	8
2002–03	Boston Bruins	NHL	78	7	17	24	99	5	0	1	1	4
2003–04	Boston Bruins	NHL	81	6	24	30	98	7	0	2	2	2
2004–05	Nottingham Panthers	EIHL	9	1	3	4	4	6	1	2	3	22
2005–06	Boston Bruins	NHL	54	5	7	12	93	—	—	—	—	—
2006–07	Phoenix Coyotes	NHL	59	2	9	11	138	—	—	—	—	—
2007–08	Phoenix Coyotes	NHL	79	3	9	12	125	—	—	—	—	—
2008–09	Florida Panthers	NHL	68	5	16	21	91	—	—	—	—	—
2009–10	Anaheim Ducks	NHL	42	1	6	7	59	—	—	—	—	—
2009–10	Manitoba Moose	AHL	9	0	4	4	4	—	—	—	—	—
2009–10	Rockford IceHogs	AHL	6	0	1	1	18	—	—	—	—	—
2009–10	Chicago Blackhawks	NHL	7	0	1	1	12	3	0	0	0	2
2010–11	Chicago Blackhawks	NHL	41	1	7	8	36	—	—	—	—	—
2010–11	Philadelphia Flyers	NHL	10	0	0	0	4	—	—	—	—	—
NHL totals			605	34	110	144	862	21	1	5	6	16

== Awards and honours ==
Award	Year
CHL
OHL All-Rookie Team	1996
Memorial Cup All-Star Team	1999
Stafford Smythe Memorial Trophy	1999
NHL
NHL YoungStars Game	2002
NHL All-Rookie Team	2002
NHL All-Star Game	2004
Stanley Cup (Chicago Blackhawks)	2010

Awards and achievements
Preceded by Jaroslav Svejkovský	Washington Capitals first-round draft pick 1997	Succeeded by Kris Beech
Preceded by Sergei Samsonov	Boston Bruins first-round draft pick 1999	Succeeded by Lars Jonsson
