= Andre Lakos =

Austrian ice hockey player

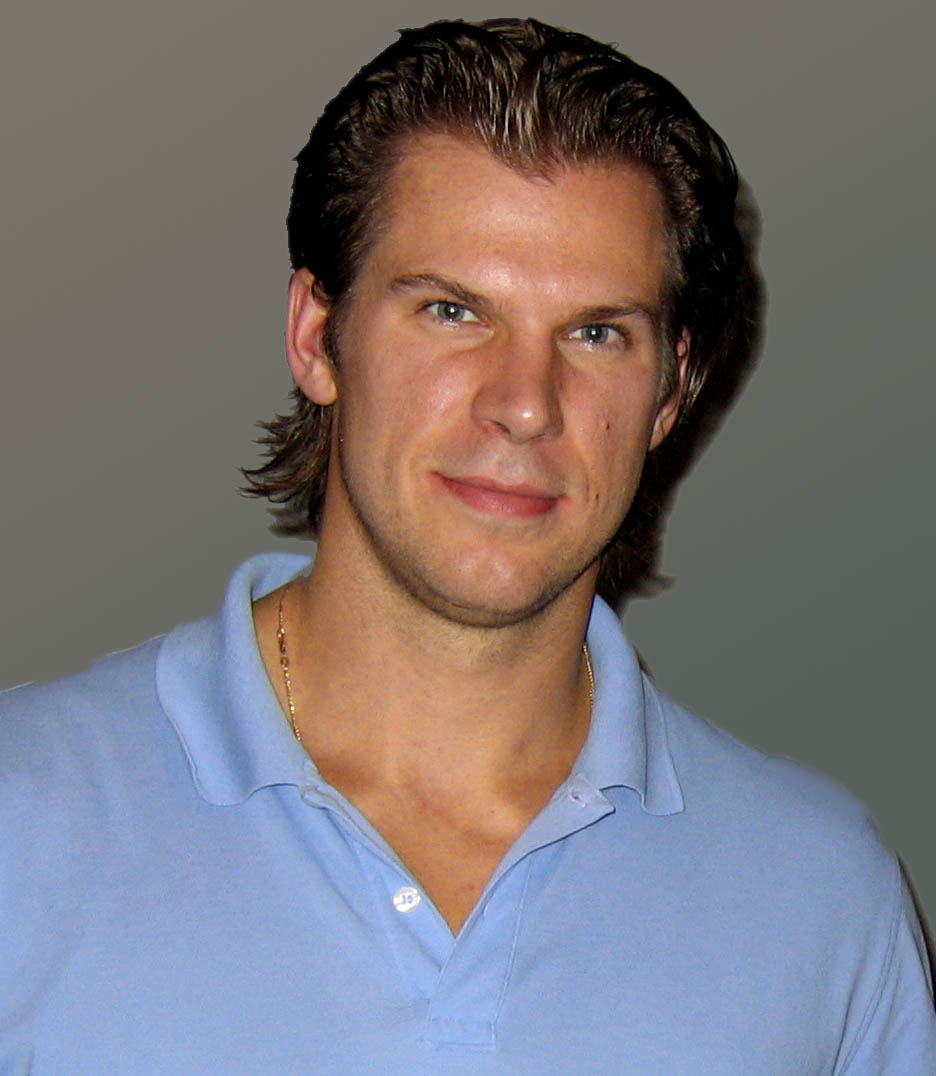
- Born: July 29, 1979 (age 46) Vienna, Austria
- Height: 6 ft 6 in (198 cm)
- Weight: 240 lb (109 kg; 17 st 2 lb)
- Position: Defence
- Shoots: Right
- CZE team Former teams: HC Kladno; Orli Znojmo; SCL Tigers; CSM Dunărea Galați; Vienna Capitals; EC Red Bull Salzburg; Färjestads BK; Traktor Chelyabinsk; Kölner Haie; EC Bad Tölz
- National team: Austria
- NHL draft: 95th overall, 1999; New Jersey Devils
- Playing career: 1999–present

André Lakos (born July 29, 1979) is a professional Austria ice hockey defenceman, currently playing for HC Kladno of the Czech Extraliga (CZE).

== Playing career ==
In 1995 Lakos started playing for the Montreal Bourassa of the Quebec Midget AAA league, the next season he joined the Shelburne Wolves of the Ontario Junior Hockey League. For the 1997–98 season Lakos started playing Major junior hockey when he joined the revived Toronto St. Michael's Majors franchise of the Ontario Hockey League (OHL). The St. Michael's Majors struggled in their first season back in the OHL and finished last in the East Division, Lakos then joined the Barrie Colts for the 1998–99 season. After having a successful season with the conference winning Colts Lakos was drafted, 95th overall, by the New Jersey Devils in the 1999 NHL entry draft.

On May 17, 2013, Lakos again left the Vienna Capitals and signed a contract as a free agent with KLH Chomutov of the Czech Extraliga.

== Career statistics ==
=== Regular season and playoffs ===
			Regular season					Playoffs
Season	Team	League	GP	G	A	Pts	PIM	GP	G	A	Pts	PIM
1995–96	Montreal Canadiens AAA	QMAAA	40	2	13	15		—	—	—	—	—
1996–97	Shelburne Wolves	MetJHL	36	5	12	17	47	—	—	—	—	—
1996–97	North Battleford North Stars	SJHL	8	0	0	0	12	—	—	—	—	—
1997–98	Toronto St. Michael's Majors	OHL	49	2	10	12	54	—	—	—	—	—
1998–99	Barrie Colts	OHL	62	4	23	27	40	12	3	3	6	8
1999–2000	Albany River Rats	AHL	65	1	7	8	41	5	0	2	2	4
2000–01	Albany River Rats	AHL	51	1	20	21	29	—	—	—	—	—
2001–02	Albany River Rats	AHL	36	0	3	3	24	—	—	—	—	—
2001–02	Utah Grizzlies	AHL	26	0	1	1	28	1	0	0	0	0
2002–03	Augusta Lynx	ECHL	36	0	3	3	24	—	—	—	—	—
2002–03	Vienna Capitals	EBEL	37	4	19	23	103	—	—	—	—	—
2003–04	Vienna Capitals	EBEL	48	6	19	25	75	—	—	—	—	—
2004–05	Syracuse Crunch	AHL	51	1	12	13	51	—	—	—	—	—
2005–06	EC Red Bull Salzburg	EBEL	46	8	22	30	115	11	3	7	10	2
2006–07	EC Red Bull Salzburg	EBEL	52	16	28	44	125	8	3	4	7	6
2007–08	Houston Aeros	AHL	11	0	1	1	14	—	—	—	—	—
2007–08	Färjestads BK	SEL	33	4	6	10	130	—	—	—	—	—
2008–09	Traktor Chelyabinsk	KHL	41	3	9	12	65	3	0	1	1	6
2009–10	Traktor Chelyabinsk	KHL	35	0	7	7	40	—	—	—	—	—
2009–10	EC Red Bull Salzburg	EBEL	10	1	3	4	12	18	1	8	9	14
2010–11	EC Red Bull Salzburg	EBEL	43	13	19	32	26	17	1	8	9	20
2011–12	Kölner Haie	DEL	27	2	12	14	26	—	—	—	—	—
2011–12	Vienna Capitals	EBEL	9	5	6	11	8	7	1	3	4	6
2012–13	Vienna Capitals	EBEL	49	9	29	38	62	15	0	11	11	12
2013–14	Piráti Chomutov	ELH	12	0	2	2	10	—	—	—	—	—
2013–14	Vienna Capitals	EBEL	23	2	11	13	28	5	2	1	3	4
2014–15	CSM Dunărea Galați	ROU	1	0	0	0	0	—	—	—	—	—
2014–15	SCL Tigers	SUI.2	12	2	5	7	22	—	—	—	—	—
2015–16	Orli Znojmo	EBEL	14	0	6	6	12	16	2	9	11	4
2016–17	Orli Znojmo	EBEL	48	4	26	30	44	4	0	2	2	6
2017–18	Tölzer Löwen	GER.2	25	3	16	19	64	—	—	—	—	—
2017–18	Orli Znojmo	EBEL	8	0	4	4	6	—	—	—	—	—
2018–19	Graz99ers	EBEL	23	0	2	2	22	—	—	—	—	—
2018–19	Rytíři Kladno	CZE.2	13	1	1	2	18	10	1	4	5	14
2019–20	Rytíři Kladno	ELH	38	3	5	8	46	—	—	—	—	—
AHL totals			240	3	44	47	187	6	0	2	2	4
EBEL totals			405	68	193	261	618	106	13	54	67	94
KHL totals			76	3	16	19	105	3	0	1	1	6

=== International ===
Year	Team	Event	GP	G	A	Pts	PIM
1996	Austria	EJC C	4	0	1	1	8
1997	Austria	WJC C	4	0	1	1	2
1997	Austria	EJC C	4	3	4	7	14
1998	Austria	WJC C	4	0	1	1	24
1999	Austria	WC	6	0	0	0	6
2000	Austria	WC	6	0	0	0	6
2002	Austria	OG	4	0	0	0	6
2002	Austria	WC	6	2	1	3	16
2003	Austria	WC	6	0	3	3	4
2004	Austria	WC	6	1	2	3	6
2005	Austria	WC	6	1	1	2	6
2006	Austria	WC D1	5	1	2	3	0
2007	Austria	WC	6	3	1	4	4
2009	Austria	OGQ	3	1	1	2	0
2009	Austria	WC	6	0	0	0	14
2013	Austria	OGQ	3	1	3	4	0
2013	Austria	WC	7	1	0	1	4
2014	Austria	OG	4	0	0	0	4
Junior totals			16	3	7	10	48
Senior totals			74	11	14	25	76
