= 1992 in ice hockey =

The following is a chronicle of events during the year 1992 in ice hockey.

== Olympics ==
The games for the 1992 Winter Olympics ice hockey tournament were played at the Méribel Ice Palace in Méribel, France, about 45 km from host city Albertville. The gold medal was won by the Unified Team, a roster comprised with players from the dissolved Soviet Union, defeating Canada for the silver medal, who earned their first hockey medal since 1968. Joe Juneau was the leading scorer, with 15 points.

== National Hockey League ==
- Art Ross Trophy as the NHL's leading scorer during the regular season: Mario Lemieux, Pittsburgh Penguins
- Hart Memorial Trophy: for the NHL's Most Valuable Player: Mark Messier, New York Rangers
- Stanley Cup - Pittsburgh Penguins defeat the Chicago Blackhawks in the 1992 Stanley Cup Final
- With the first overall pick in the 1992 NHL Amateur Draft, the Tampa Bay Lightning selected Roman Hamrlik.
- During the 1992 preseason, Manon Rhéaume became the first woman to appear in an NHL game, tending goal for the Tampa Bay Lightning versus the St. Louis Blues.

== Canadian Hockey League ==
- Ontario Hockey League: The Sault Ste. Marie Greyhounds won J. Ross Robertson Cup.
- Quebec Major Junior Hockey League: Verdun Collège Français won President's Cup (QMJHL) for the third time in team history
- Western Hockey League: Kamloops Blazers won President's Cup (WHL) for the fourth time in team history
- Memorial Cup: Kamloops Blazers

== World Hockey Championship ==
  - Men's champion: Swedencaptured the gold medal in the 1992 Men's Ice Hockey World Championships
  - Junior Men's champion: Sweden won the gold medal at the 1992 World Junior Ice Hockey Championships

== European hockey ==
- The 1992 European Cup was won by Malmö IF, who beat Dynamo Moscow in the final.

== Women's hockey ==
The 1992 IIHF World Women's Championships was held April 20–26, 1992, in Tampere in Finland. Canada won the gold medal, defeating the United States.

== Minor League hockey ==
- American Hockey League: The Adirondack Red Wings won the Calder Cup, defeating the St. John's Maple Leafs, four games to three, with each team winning their respective home games.
- ECHL: The Hampton Roads Admirals won the Kelly Cup.
- IHL: The Kansas City Blades won the Turner Cup. Goaltender Manon Rhéaume appeared in a game with the Atlanta Knights on December 14 versus Salt Lake City. She appeared in the second period, playing 5:49, stopping three shots and allowing one goal.
- United Hockey League: The Thunder Bay Thunder Cats won the Colonial Cup.

== Junior A hockey ==
- The Des Moines Buccaneers captured the Clark Cup.

== University hockey ==
- Scott Pellerin of the Maine Black Bears men's ice hockey program won the Hobey Baker Award.
- The Lake Superior State Lakers men's ice hockey program won the NCAA Division I Men's Ice Hockey Tournament.

== Births ==
=== January ===
- Kewin Orellana: January 8
- Krister Mähönen: January 30

=== February ===
- Matúš Viedenský: February 12

=== April ===
- Aki Kivelä: April 4

== Deaths ==
- Fern Gauthier: November 7
- Jimmy Orlando: October 24

== Season articles ==
1991–92 NHL season	1992–93 NHL season
1991–92 AHL season	1992–93 AHL season

== See also ==
- 1992 in sports
