= 1995–96 MetJHL season =

- League: Metro Junior A Hockey League
- Sport: Hockey
- Duration: Regular season 1995-09 – 1996-02; Playoffs; 1996-02 – 1996-05
- Teams: 12
- Finals champions: Caledon Canadians

MetJHL seasons
- 1994–95 1996–97

The 1995–96 MetJHL season is the 5th season of the Metro Junior A Hockey League (MetJHL). The 12 teams of the Eastern and Western Divisions competed in a 52-game schedule. The top 4 teams in each division made the playoffs.

The winner of the MetJHL playoffs, the Caledon Canadians, could not move into national playdowns as the Metro was not a member of the Ontario Hockey Association.

== Changes ==
- MetJHL leaves Ontario Hockey Association.
- Changes division names from Fullan and Bauer to Eastern and Western.
- Shelburne Hornets join MetJHL.
- Markham Waxers join MetJHL from OPJHL.
- Niagara Scenic join MetJHL from EJHL.
- St. Michael's Buzzers, Bramalea Blues, Kingston Voyageurs and Mississauga Senators leave MetJHL for OPJHL.
- Aurora Eagles become Aurora Tigers.
- Richmond Hill Riot leave MetJHL.

== Final standings ==
Note: GP = Games played; W = Wins; L = Losses; OTL = Overtime losses; SL = Shootout losses; GF = Goals for; GA = Goals against; PTS = Points; x = clinched playoff berth; y = clinched division title; z = clinched conference title

Eastern Division
Team	GP	W	L	T	GF	GA	P
Wexford Raiders	52	36	14	2	261	171	74
Thornhill Islanders	52	34	15	3	251	172	71
Markham Waxers	52	30	17	5	241	204	65
Wellington Dukes	52	26	23	3	219	222	55
Pickering Panthers	52	14	32	6	197	259	34
Oshawa Legionaires	52	13	38	1	184	286	27
Western Division
Team	GP	W	L	T	GF	GA	P
Caledon Canadians	52	35	13	4	283	179	74
Niagara Scenic	52	32	15	5	294	242	69
Aurora Tigers	52	28	18	6	255	206	62
Muskoka Bears	52	21	26	5	237	229	47
North York Rangers	52	13	32	7	250	284	33
Shelburne Hornets	52	5	44	3	160	383	13

== 1995-96 MetJHL Playoffs ==
Quarter-final

Wexford Raiders defeated Wellington Dukes 4-games-to-1
Thornhill Islanders defeated Markham Waxers 4-games-to-1
Caledon Canadians defeated Muskoka Bears 4-games-to-2
Niagara Scenic defeated Aurora Tigers 4-games-to-3

Semi-final

Thornhill Islanders defeated Wexford Raiders 4-games-to-2
Caledon Canadians defeated Niagara Scenic 4-games-to-none

Final

Caledon Canadians defeated Thornhill Islanders 4-games-to-3

== Players selected in 1996 NHL entry draft ==
- Rd 1 #15 Dainius Zubrus - Philadelphia Flyers (Caledon Canadians)

== See also ==
- 1996 Royal Bank Cup
- Dudley Hewitt Cup
- List of Ontario Hockey Association Junior A seasons
- Ontario Junior A Hockey League
- Northern Ontario Junior Hockey League
- 1995 in ice hockey
- 1996 in ice hockey

Preceded by 1994–95 MetJHL season	Ontario Hockey Association; Junior A seasons	Succeeded by 1996–97 MetJHL season
