= Kewin =

Kewin may refer to:

- Kewin Orellana (born 1992), Swiss hockey player
- Kewin (footballer) (born 1995), Brazilian footballer

== See also ==
- Kevin
