= Brian Gionta =

American ice hockey player (born 1979)

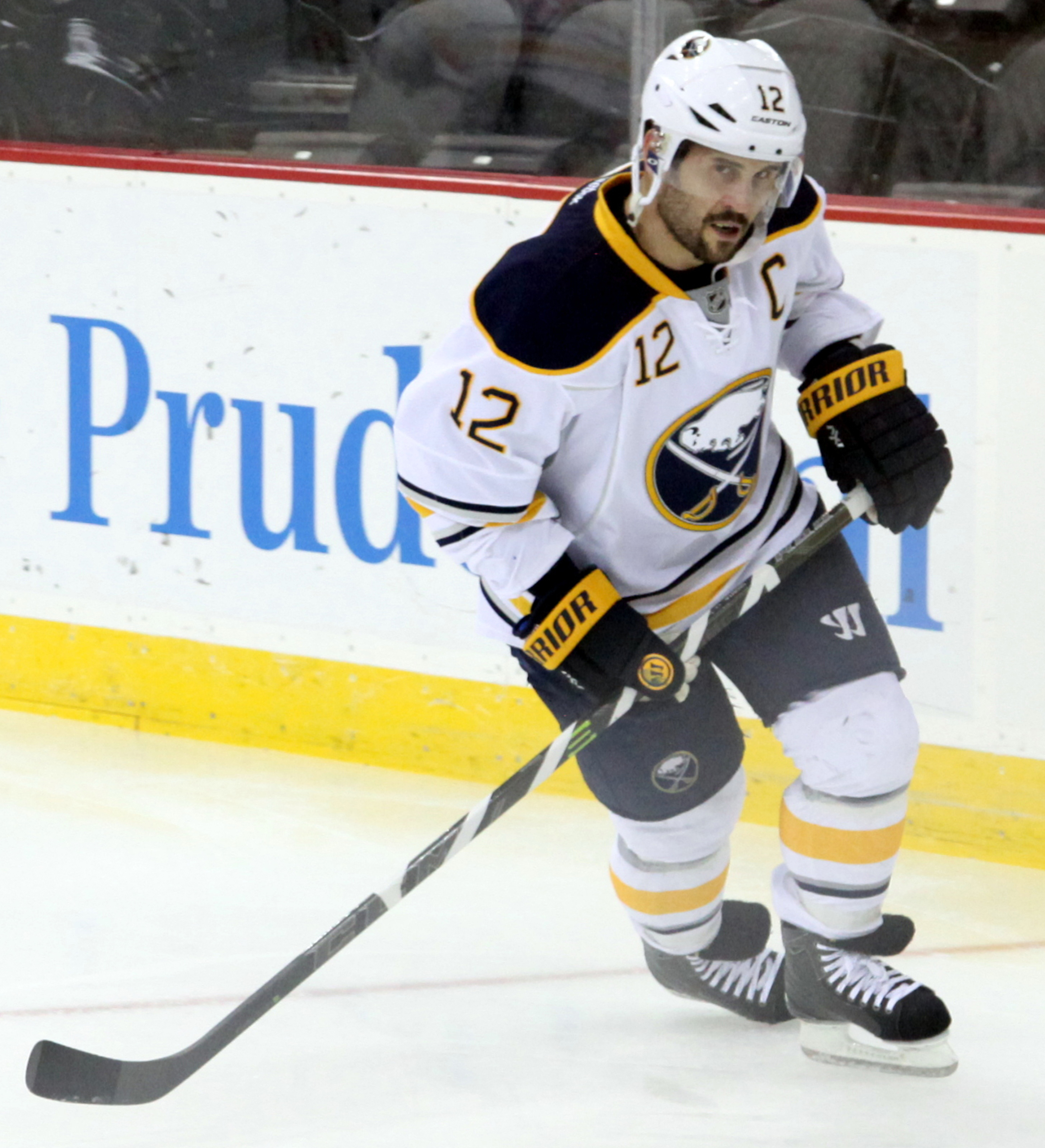
- Gionta with the Buffalo Sabres in April 2016
- Born: January 18, 1979 (age 47) Rochester, New York, U.S.
- Height: 5 ft 7 in (170 cm)
- Weight: 178 lb (81 kg; 12 st 10 lb)
- Position: Right wing
- Shot: Right
- Played for: New Jersey Devils; Montreal Canadiens; Buffalo Sabres; Boston Bruins
- National team: United States
- NHL draft: 82nd overall, 1998; New Jersey Devils
- Playing career: 2001–2018

Brian Joseph Gionta (born January 18, 1979) is an American former professional ice hockey player who played 16 seasons in the National Hockey League (NHL). Gionta began his NHL career in 2001 with the New Jersey Devils and served as captain for both the Montreal Canadiens and the Buffalo Sabres. He also was the captain for the United States in the 2018 Winter Olympics, for which he stepped away from the NHL for most of its 2017–18 season (NHL refused to release its players to the Olympics for the first time since 1994). After the Olympics, he briefly played for the Boston Bruins, and retired following their elimination from the playoffs.

== Playing career ==
As a youth, Gionta played in the 1993 Quebec International Pee-Wee Hockey Tournament with a minor ice hockey team from Rochester, New York.

=== Boston College ===
Gionta was drafted 82nd overall by the New Jersey Devils in the 1998 NHL entry draft. The diminutive but fiery forward attended high school at the Aquinas Institute in Rochester, New York, where in 1993–94 he was selected as their Rookie of the Year. He then skated for Boston College from 1997 to 2001, winning a national championship as Eagles captain in the 2000–01 season. He was mentored by former NHL forward Marty Reasoner, also a Rochester native, and enjoyed his best statistical season in his freshman year on a line with Reasoner, posting 30 goals and 62 points in 40 games as the Eagles fell to the University of Michigan in the national championship game in Boston.

Gionta followed up with a 60-point season his sophomore year as Boston College was eliminated by their Hockey East rival, the University of Maine, in the Frozen Four semi-finals. In his junior year, he posted a 33-goal, 56-point season as the Eagles fell to the University of North Dakota in that year's national championship game.

In his senior season as captain, Gionta's point total dipped again to 54 points. Nevertheless, a roster stocked with future NHL talent produced a national championship as Boston College defeated North Dakota 3–2 in overtime in Albany, New York. During his senior season, he led the nation in goal-scoring with 33 goals, including a performance against the University of Maine in which he scored on each of his first five shots.

=== New Jersey Devils (2001–2009) ===
Gionta, who joined the New Jersey Devils during the 2001–02 season, was a member of the 2003 Stanley Cup Final-winning team that prevailed over the Mighty Ducks of Anaheim. During the 2004–05 NHL lockout, he played for the Devils' American Hockey League (AHL) affiliate, the Albany River Rats. In 2006, he was a member of the 2006 United States' men's team that competed in Turin, Italy.

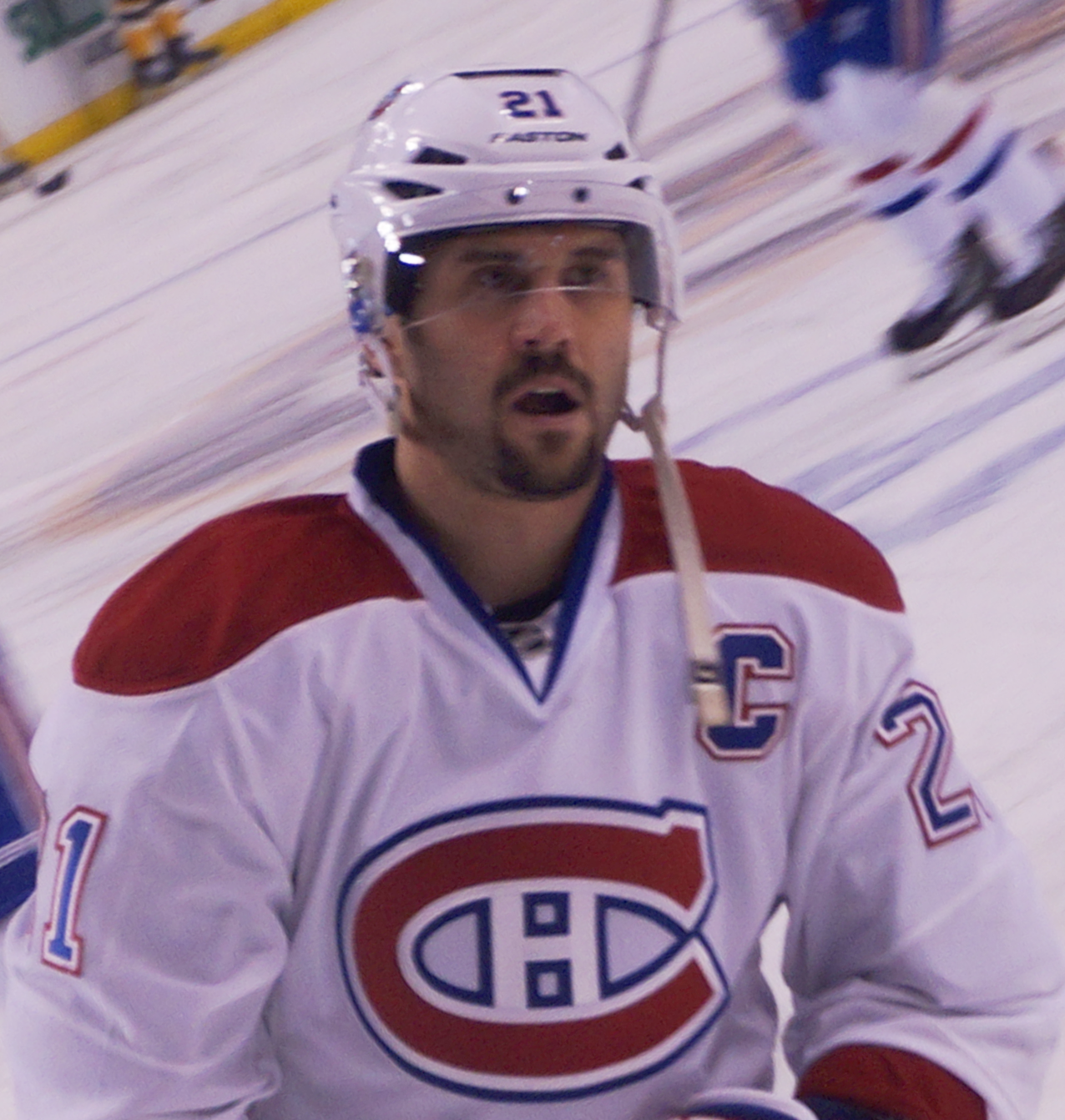
Gionta in May 2014 as captain of the Montreal Canadiens

As part of the Devils' prolific "EGG" line – along with Patrik Eliáš and Scott Gomez – Gionta was an offensive catalyst. In the last game of the 2005–06 season, Gionta broke Pat Verbeek's franchise record for goals in a season, finishing with 48. In that season, he also finished with his highest point total to date, with 89 in all 82 games of the regular season. On October 27, 2007, Gionta scored the first Devils' goal in the history of the Prudential Center in the second period of a 4–1 loss to Ottawa. (Chris Neil scored the first ever).

Gionta played 473 regular season games in total for New Jersey, in addition to 67 Stanley Cup Playoff games. As of 2011, Gionta holds the franchise all-time power play goal-scoring record in one season, with 24.

=== Montreal Canadiens (2009–2014) ===
On July 1, 2009, Gionta signed a five-year contract for $25 million with the Montreal Canadiens. It reunited him with former Devils teammate Scott Gomez. Gionta scored the last goal at Pittsburgh's Civic Arena (known as Mellon Arena at the time) during game seven of the 2010 Eastern Conference Semifinals against the Penguins, on May 12, 2010.

Just prior to his second season with the club, in 2010–11, on September 29, 2010, Gionta became only the second American-born player to serve as team captain of the Canadiens, after Chris Chelios.

During the 2012–13 season, Gionta played in all 48 games of the lockout-shortened season and registered 14 goals and 12 assists while leading the Canadiens on a remarkable comeback from last in the Eastern Conference to their 23rd Northeast Division title. On March 5, 2013, Gionta scored the 20,000th NHL goal in the history of the Canadiens in a game against the New York Rangers.^{[note 1]} Entering the 2013 Stanley Cup playoffs as the second seed against the Ottawa Senators, Gionta tore his bicep in game one and was forced to undergo season-ending surgery to repair it.

=== Buffalo Sabres (2014–2017) ===
On July 1, 2014, Gionta signed a three-year free-agent deal with hometown team, the Buffalo Sabres, for $4.25 million per year. On October 7, 2014, Gionta was named captain of the Sabres, Becoming the first New York native to be named to the position. Gionta played in his 1,000th NHL game on March 27, 2017 against the Florida Panthers in Buffalo.

=== Boston Bruins (2018) ===
On February 25, 2018, Gionta signed a one-year, $700,000 contract for the remainder of the season with the Boston Bruins.

== Retirement ==
Gionta announced his retirement on September 24, 2018, and revealed that he had joined the Sabres as a development coach.

In January 2023, Niagara University announced that Gionta would join their D1 hockey team’s coaching staff as the Director of Player Development.

Gionta is also the associate head coach to the Rochester Jr. Americans of the NAHL.

== International play ==
The Sabres opted not to re-sign Gionta in the 2017 offseason after reacquiring Jason Pominville in a trade. The Sabres' owned-and-operated American Hockey League club, the Rochester Americans, signed Gionta to their practice squad on October 9, 2017. Since the practice-only contract was not with the NHL, Gionta was able to participate in the Winter Olympics, following the NHL's announcement not to accommodate an Olympic break due to financial disputes with the IOC. Gionta was officially named to Team USA's pre-Olympic roster on October 18, 2017, and was named USA team captain. Gionta admitted turning down NHL offers to participate in the Olympics and intended to re-sign with the league after the Olympics ended.

On January 29, 2018, the Americans upgraded Gionta's practice-squad contract to a one-game professional tryout contract, allowing him to play in a game for his hometown team on February 2, 2018 against the Toronto Marlies before leaving for the Olympics. Gionta scored a goal in the game, but the Americans lost 4-2.

== Personal life ==
Gionta is the middle child of Sam and Penny Gionta. He and his wife, Harvest, have three children. Gionta has a brother, Stephen, who played for the New Jersey Devils and New York Islanders. He also has an older brother Joe, who also played for the Aquinas Institute Hockey Team and graduated in 1994. Brian Gionta has a home in the Rochester, New York area where his parents still reside.

== Records ==
- New Jersey Devils record for most goals in a season (48 in 2005–06)

== Career statistics ==
=== Regular season and playoffs ===
| | | | Regular season | | | | | Playoffs |
| Season | Team | League | GP | G | A | Pts | PIM | GP | G | A | Pts | PIM |
|---|---|---|---|---|---|---|---|---|---|---|---|---|
| 1993–94 | Aquinas Institute | HS-NY | — | — | — | — | — | — | — | — | — | — |
| 1994–95 | Rochester Jr. Americans | EmJHL | 28 | 52 | 37 | 89 | — | — | — | — | — | — |
| 1995–96 | Niagara Scenic | MetJHL | 51 | 47 | 44 | 91 | 59 | — | — | — | — | — |
| 1996–97 | Niagara Scenic | MetJHL | 50 | 57 | 70 | 127 | 101 | 6 | 6 | 11 | 17 | 21 |
| 1997–98 | Boston College | HE | 40 | 30 | 32 | 62 | 44 | — | — | — | — | — |
| 1998–99 | Boston College | HE | 39 | 27 | 33 | 60 | 46 | — | — | — | — | — |
| 1999–00 | Boston College | HE | 42 | 33 | 23 | 56 | 66 | — | — | — | — | — |
| 2000–01 | Boston College | HE | 43 | 33 | 21 | 54 | 47 | — | — | — | — | — |
| 2001–02 | Albany River Rats | AHL | 37 | 9 | 16 | 25 | 18 | — | — | — | — | — |
| 2001–02 | New Jersey Devils | NHL | 33 | 4 | 7 | 11 | 8 | 6 | 2 | 2 | 4 | 0 |
| 2002–03 | New Jersey Devils | NHL | 58 | 12 | 13 | 25 | 23 | 24 | 1 | 8 | 9 | 6 |
| 2003–04 | New Jersey Devils | NHL | 75 | 21 | 8 | 29 | 36 | 5 | 2 | 3 | 5 | 0 |
| 2004–05 | Albany River Rats | AHL | 15 | 5 | 7 | 12 | 10 | — | — | — | — | — |
| 2005–06 | New Jersey Devils | NHL | 82 | 48 | 41 | 89 | 46 | 9 | 3 | 4 | 7 | 2 |
| 2006–07 | New Jersey Devils | NHL | 62 | 25 | 20 | 45 | 36 | 11 | 8 | 1 | 9 | 4 |
| 2007–08 | New Jersey Devils | NHL | 82 | 22 | 31 | 53 | 46 | 5 | 1 | 0 | 1 | 2 |
| 2008–09 | New Jersey Devils | NHL | 81 | 20 | 40 | 60 | 32 | 7 | 2 | 3 | 5 | 4 |
| 2009–10 | Montreal Canadiens | NHL | 61 | 28 | 18 | 46 | 26 | 19 | 9 | 6 | 15 | 14 |
| 2010–11 | Montreal Canadiens | NHL | 82 | 29 | 17 | 46 | 24 | 7 | 3 | 2 | 5 | 0 |
| 2011–12 | Montreal Canadiens | NHL | 31 | 8 | 7 | 15 | 16 | — | — | — | — | — |
| 2012–13 | Montreal Canadiens | NHL | 48 | 14 | 12 | 26 | 8 | 2 | 0 | 1 | 1 | 0 |
| 2013–14 | Montreal Canadiens | NHL | 81 | 18 | 22 | 40 | 22 | 17 | 1 | 6 | 7 | 2 |
| 2014–15 | Buffalo Sabres | NHL | 69 | 13 | 22 | 35 | 18 | — | — | — | — | — |
| 2015–16 | Buffalo Sabres | NHL | 79 | 12 | 21 | 33 | 12 | — | — | — | — | — |
| 2016–17 | Buffalo Sabres | NHL | 82 | 15 | 20 | 35 | 22 | — | — | — | — | — |
| 2017–18 | Rochester Americans | AHL | 1 | 1 | 0 | 1 | 0 | — | — | — | — | — |
| 2017–18 | Boston Bruins | NHL | 20 | 2 | 5 | 7 | 2 | 1 | 0 | 0 | 0 | 0 |
| NHL totals | | | 1,026 | 291 | 304 | 595 | 377 | 113 | 32 | 36 | 68 | 34 |

=== International ===
| Year | Team | Event | GP | G | A | Pts | PIM |
|---|---|---|---|---|---|---|---|
| 1998 | United States | WJC | 7 | 5 | 3 | 8 | 0 |
| 1999 | United States | WJC | 6 | 6 | 5 | 11 | 6 |
| 2000 | United States | WC | 7 | 2 | 1 | 3 | 2 |
| 2001 | United States | WC | 9 | 2 | 0 | 2 | 6 |
| 2005 | United States | WC | 7 | 2 | 1 | 3 | 6 |
| 2006 | United States | OLY | 6 | 4 | 0 | 4 | 2 |
| 2018 | United States | OLY | 5 | 0 | 0 | 0 | 4 |
| Junior totals | | | 13 | 11 | 8 | 19 | 6 |
| Senior totals | | | 34 | 10 | 2 | 12 | 20 |

== Awards and honors ==
| Award | Year |
|---|---|
| All-Hockey East Rookie Team | 1997–98 |
| Hockey East Rookie of the Year | 1997–98 |
| All-Hockey East Second Team | 1997–98 |
| AHCA East Second-Team All-American | 1997–98 |
| All-Hockey East First Team | 1998–99, 1999–2000, 2000–01 |
| AHCA East First-Team All-American | 1998–99, 1999–2000, 2000–01 |
| World Junior Championships All-Star Team | 1999 |
| Hockey East Player of the Year | 2000–01 |
| Stanley Cup | 2003 |

== Notes ==
1: Michael Cammalleri had previously scored the 20,000th goal in Canadiens' franchise history in 2009. Cammalleri's mark included the Canadiens time in the National Hockey Association.

Awards and achievements
| Preceded by Greg Koehler | Hockey East Rookie of the Year; 1997–98 | Succeeded by Darren Haydar |
| Preceded by Ty Conklin; Mike Mottau | Hockey East Player of the Year; 2000–01 | Succeeded by Darren Haydar |
| Preceded by Cory Larose | Hockey East Scoring Champion; 2000–01 | Succeeded by Darren Haydar |
| Preceded by Award created | Hockey East Three-Stars Award; 2000–01 | Succeeded by Colin Hemingway |
Sporting positions
| Preceded by Saku Koivu | Montreal Canadiens captain 2010–14 | Succeeded by Max Pacioretty |
| Preceded by Steve Ott | Buffalo Sabres captain 2014–17 | Succeeded by Jack Eichel |
