= Max Birbraer =

Kazakhstani-born Israeli ice hockey player

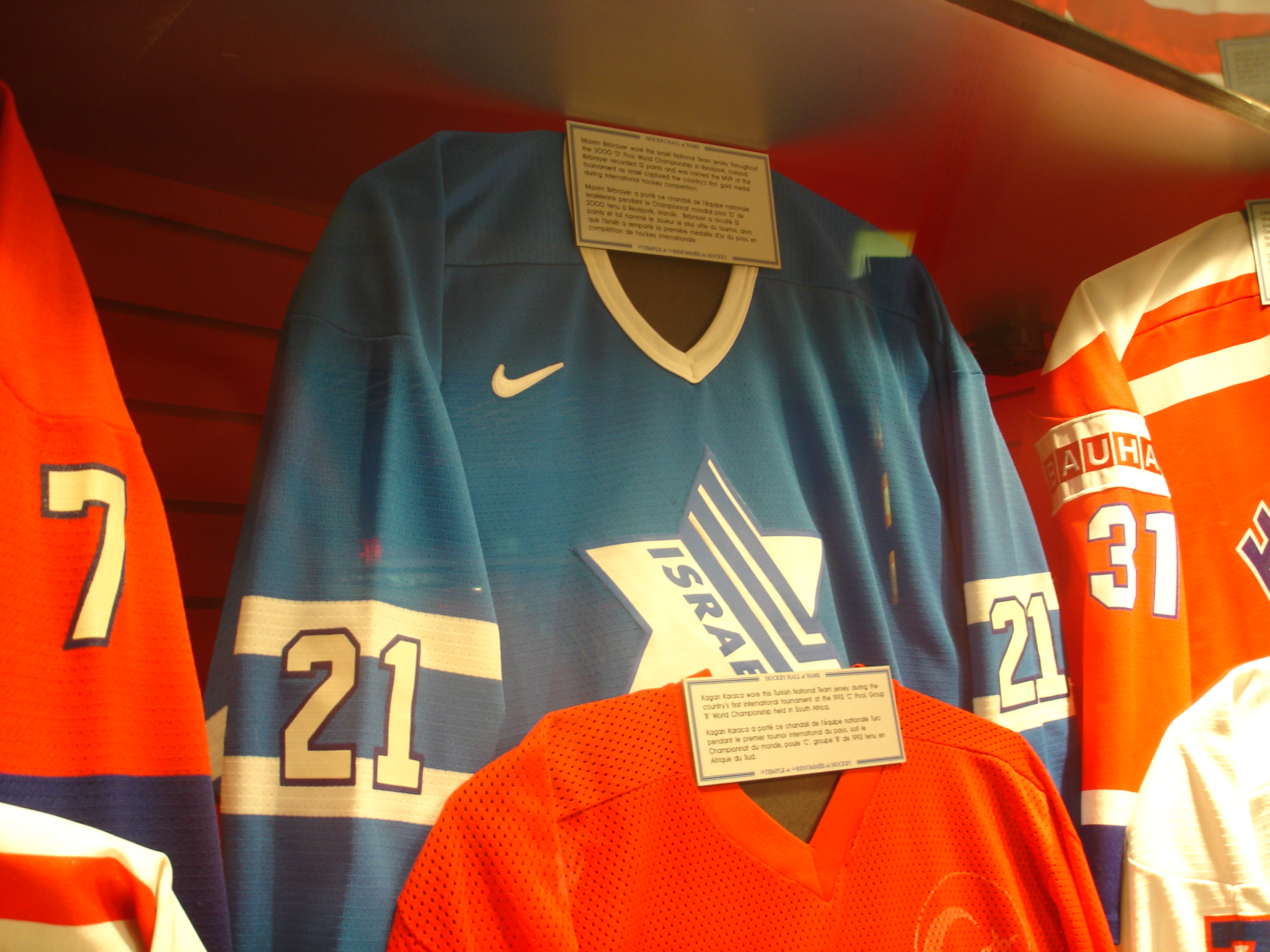
- Birbraer wore #21 with the Israeli National Team
- Born: December 15, 1980 (age 45) Ust-Kamenogorsk, Kazakh SSR, USSR
- Height: 6 ft 2 in (188 cm)
- Weight: 195 lb (88 kg; 13 st 13 lb)
- Position: Right wing
- Shot: Left
- EIHL team: Fife Flyers (President & General Manager)
- Played for: Albany River Rats; San Antonio Rampage; Cardiff Devils; Heilbronner Falken; Telford Tigers; Swindon Wildcats; Bristol Pitbulls; Cardiff Canucks
- National team: Israel
- NHL draft: 67th overall, 2000; New Jersey Devils
- Playing career: 1999–2025

Maxim Birbraer (Hebrew: מקס בירבראייר; born December 15, 1980) is a Kazakhstani-born Israeli former professional ice hockey forward. Birbraer is Jewish and has played for the Israel national ice hockey team. Since June 2025, Birbraer has been the President and General Manager of Elite Ice Hockey League side Fife Flyers.

== Playing career ==
Birbraer was born in Ust-Kamenogorsk, Kazakhstan, where he lived until the age of 14, and is Jewish. His family lived under a non-Jewish sounding surname in those years due to severe local anti-Semitism, and he was not told that he was Jewish until his parents decided to move to Israel. Although he had played schoolboy hockey in Russia, he assumed that he would have to give up the ice when he was 14 and his family immigrated to Israel, until he discovered an indoor rink in Tel Aviv where he played in a junior league. He had lived in Israel for only 8 months when his coach, Paul Rosen, persuaded him to try out for a Canadian league with the result that he spent 2 years playing Tier 2 hockey in Ontario, where Rosen was his legal guardian. He then joined the Ontario Provincial Junior A Hockey League.

He was the only Israeli national ever to be drafted by an NHL team when he was drafted 67th overall in the 2000 NHL entry draft by the New Jersey Devils. Despite this, he never played in the NHL, instead spending three seasons with their American Hockey League affiliate, the Albany River Rats. In 2006, Birbraer signed with the Cardiff Devils of the Elite Ice Hockey League, and played with the team for 7 years. Birbraer signed with the Telford Tigers in 2014.

Birbraer continued playing for the Swindon Wildcats until 2020, before taking two years out. He returned to play semi-professionally for the Bristol Pitbulls and his final season as a player was in 2024–25 with another of the Cardiff Devils' affiliates - the Cardiff Canucks in the NIHL2.

== Management career ==
In June 2025, EIHL side Fife Flyers announced new ownership led by a North American group, with Birbraer confirmed as the Flyers' new President and General Manager.

== Career statistics ==
=== Regular season and playoffs ===
			Regular season					Playoffs
Season	Team	League	GP	G	A	Pts	PIM	GP	G	A	Pts	PIM
1997–98	Shelburne Wolves	MetJHL	12	7	11	18	8	—	—	—	—	—
1998–99	Shelburne Wolves	OPJHL	35	20	22	42	25	—	—	—	—	—
1999–2000	Newmarket Hurricanes	OPJHL	47	50	32	82	52	—	—	—	—	—
2000–01	Albany River Rats	AHL	50	7	6	13	24	—	—	—	—	—
2001–02	Albany River Rats	AHL	40	6	7	13	24	—	—	—	—	—
2002–03	Albany River Rats	AHL	57	6	6	12	42	—	—	—	—	—
2003–04	San Antonio Rampage	AHL	17	0	2	2	6	—	—	—	—	—
2003–04	Laredo Bucks	CHL	44	16	14	30	37	14	3	2	5	33
2004–05	San Diego Gulls	ECHL	69	19	30	49	63	—	—	—	—	—
2005–06	Long Beach Ice Dogs	ECHL	13	4	3	7	10	—	—	—	—	—
2006–07	Cardiff Devils	EIHL	52	29	33	62	105	4	0	2	2	0
2007–08	Cardiff Devils	EIHL	54	20	37	57	75	3	3	0	3	0
2008–09	Kazzinc–Torpedo	RUS.2	34	5	15	20	32	—	—	—	—	—
2008–09	Heilbronner Falken	DEU.2	16	4	5	9	4	6	0	3	3	8
2009–10	Cardiff Devils	EIHL	54	22	36	58	58	4	4	3	7	0
2010–11	Cardiff Devils	EIHL	54	26	42	68	44	4	1	2	3	6
2011–12	Cardiff Devils	EIHL	24	11	20	31	43	—	—	—	—	—
2012–13	Cardiff Devils	EIHL	31	16	13	29	18	4	4	3	7	8
2013–14	Cardiff Devils	EIHL	52	16	24	40	35	—	—	—	—	—
2014–15	Telford Tigers	GBR.2	48	21	33	54	46	3	1	0	1	0
2015–16	Telford Tigers	GBR.2	51	26	34	60	123	2	1	0	1	0
2016–17	Swindon Wildcats	GBR.2	50	16	31	47	126	6	6	3	9	2
2017–18	Swindon Wildcats	GBR.2	31	15	38	53	44	4	2	6	8	2
2018–19	Swindon Wildcats	GBR.2	41	12	55	67	67	1	1	2	3	0
2019–20	Swindon Wildcats	GBR.2	22	12	41	53	32	—	—	—	—	—
AHL totals			164	19	21	40	94	—	—	—	—	—
EIHL totals			321	140	205	345	378	19	12	10	22	14

=== International ===
Year	Team	Event	GP	G	A	Pts	PIM
1997	Israel	EJC D	5	10	2	12	4
1997	Israel	WC D	5	0	1	1	2
1998	Israel	EJC D	5	5	4	9	10
1998	Israel	WC D	5	2	2	4	27
1999	Israel	WC D	4	2	5	7	0
2000	Israel	WC D	4	6	6	12	6
2008	Israel	WC Div.2	5	5	6	11	4
2013	Israel	WC Div.2B	5	5	8	13	6
Junior totals			10	15	6	21	14
Senior totals			28	20	28	48	45

== See also ==
- List of select Jewish ice hockey players
