= 1997–98 MetJHL season =

- League: Metro Junior A Hockey League
- Sport: Hockey
- Duration: Regular season 1997-09 – 1998-02; Playoffs; 1998-02 – 1998-04
- Number of teams: 16
- Finals champions: Wexford Raiders

MetJHL seasons
- ← 1996–97 1998–99 OPJHL →

The 1997–98 MetJHL season is the 7th and final season of the Metro Junior A Hockey League (MetJHL). The 16 teams of the Central, Eastern, and Western Divisions competed in a 50-game schedule. The top 12 teams made the playoffs.

The winner of the MetJHL playoffs, the Wexford Raiders, failed to defeat the Milton Merchants of the OPJHL for the OHA's Buckland Cup.

== Changes ==
- MetJHL rejoins the Ontario Hockey Association.
- Pittsburgh Jr. Penguins join MetJHL.
- Muskoka Bears become Huntsville Wildcats.
- Thornhill Islanders become Thornhill Rattlers.
- Aurora Tigers leave MetJHL for OPJHL.
- At the end of the season, league closes doors and teams merge with OPJHL.

== Final standings ==
Note: GP = Games played; W = Wins; L = Losses; OTL = Overtime losses; SL = Shootout losses; GF = Goals for; GA = Goals against; PTS = Points; x = clinched playoff berth; y = clinched division title; z = clinched conference title

Central Division
Team	GP	W	L	T	GF	GA	P
Wexford Raiders	50	39	7	4	196	167	82
Thornhill Rattlers	50	29	18	3	216	172	61
Markham Waxers	50	24	19	7	247	192	55
Pittsburgh Jr. Penguins	50	21	26	3	168	240	45
North York Rangers	50	8	33	9	165	244	25
Eastern Division
Team	GP	W	L	T	GF	GA	P
Oshawa Legionaires	50	34	15	1	266	183	69
Syracuse Jr. Crunch	49	29	16	4	273	219	62
Wellington Dukes	50	23	22	5	223	213	51
Quinte Hawks	49	23	24	2	213	222	48
Port Hope Buzzards	50	19	28	3	190	226	41
Pickering Panthers	50	16	27	7	173	213	39
Western Division
Team	GP	W	L	T	GF	GA	P
Caledon Canadians	50	40	4	6	319	123	86
Durham Huskies	50	19	29	2	194	232	40
Huntsville Wildcats	50	18	28	4	157	209	40
Shelburne Wolves	50	12	34	4	189	287	28
Niagara Scenic	50	12	36	2	115	257	26

== 1997-98 MetJHL Playoffs ==
Preliminary

Oshawa Legionaires defeated Shelburne Wolves 3-games-to-none
Syracuse Jr. Crunch defeated Pickering Panthers 3-games-to-2
Thornhill Rattlers defeated Huntsville Wildcats 3-games-to-1
Durham Huskies defeated Markham Waxers 3-games-to-1

Quarter-final

Caledon Canadians defeated Durham Huskies 3-games-to-none
Wexford Raiders defeated Quinte Hawks 3-games-to-none
Oshawa Legionaires defeated Wellington Dukes 3-games-to-2
Syracuse Jr. Crunch defeated Thornhill Rattlers 3-games-to-1

Semi-final

Caledon Canadians defeated Syracuse Jr. Crunch 4-games-to-3
Wexford Raiders defeated Oshawa Legionaires 4-games-to-2

Final

Wexford Raiders defeated Caledon Canadians 4-games-to-3

== OHA Buckland Cup Championship ==
Best-of-7 series

Milton Merchants (OPJHL) defeated Wexford Raiders 4-games-to-1

Milton Merchants 11 - Wexford Raiders 2
Milton Merchants 3 - Wexford Raiders 2 2OT
Milton Merchants 6 - Wexford Raiders 1
Wexford Raiders 4 - Milton Merchants 3 OT
Milton Merchants 6 - Wexford Raiders 1

== See also ==
- 1998 Royal Bank Cup
- Dudley Hewitt Cup
- List of Ontario Hockey Association Junior A seasons
- Ontario Junior A Hockey League
- Northern Ontario Junior Hockey League
- 1997 in ice hockey
- 1998 in ice hockey

Preceded by 1996–97 MetJHL season	Ontario Hockey Association; Junior A seasons	Succeeded by 1998–99 OPJHL season
