= Raffi Torres =

Canadian ice hockey player (born 1981)

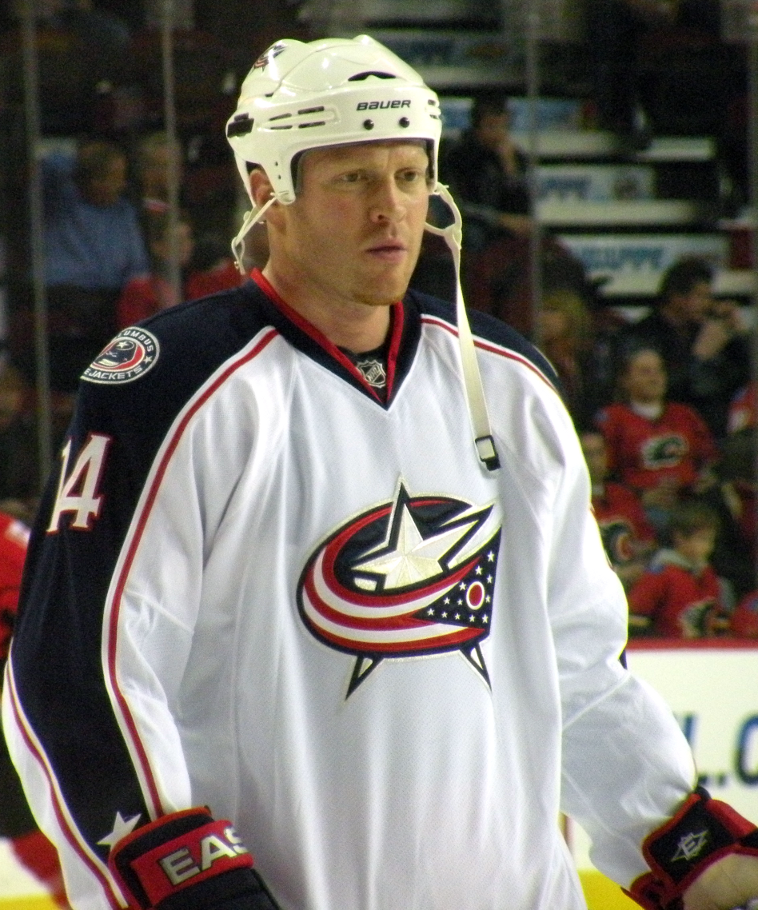
- Torres with the Columbus Blue Jackets in October 2009
- Born: October 8, 1981 (age 45) Toronto, Ontario, Canada
- Height: 6 ft 0 in (183 cm)
- Weight: 215 lb (98 kg; 15 st 5 lb)
- Position: Left wing
- Shot: Left
- Played for: New York Islanders; Edmonton Oilers; Columbus Blue Jackets; Buffalo Sabres; Vancouver Canucks; Phoenix Coyotes; San Jose Sharks
- National team: Canada
- NHL draft: 5th overall, 2000; New York Islanders
- Playing career: 2001–2016

Raphael Torres (born October 8, 1981) is a Canadian former professional ice hockey player. A left winger, he was drafted by the New York Islanders fifth overall in the 2000 NHL entry draft. He played in the National Hockey League (NHL) for the New York Islanders, Edmonton Oilers, Columbus Blue Jackets, Buffalo Sabres, Vancouver Canucks, Phoenix Coyotes and San Jose Sharks.

Torres was drafted out of the Ontario Hockey League (OHL), where he played three seasons with the Brampton Battalion. He was a two-time OHL Second Team All-Star during his junior career. Beginning in 2001–02, he turned professional with the Islanders' American Hockey League (AHL) affiliate. He spent the better part of two seasons in the AHL before the Islanders traded him to the Oilers in 2003. He played five seasons in Edmonton, becoming a full-time NHL player with the club. He recorded career numbers as an Oiler in 2005–06, while also helping them to the Stanley Cup Final that year. In the 2008 off-season, he was dealt to the Blue Jackets, where he played the better part of two seasons. After a brief stint with the Sabres in 2009–10, he signed with the Canucks and played one year for them where they reached the 2011 Stanley Cup Final. Torres then signed with the Phoenix Coyotes and then with the San Jose Sharks. Internationally, he represented Canada at the 2001 World Junior Championships, winning a bronze medal.

Torres, a physical, forechecking forward with offensive capabilities, was suspended five times for illegal hits to opponents' heads. He received the fourth-longest suspension in the history of the NHL at the time for his hit to the head of Marian Hossa in Game 3 of the 2012 Western Conference Quarterfinals. In October 2015, Torres received a 41-game (half-season) suspension for an illegal hit on Anaheim player Jakob Silfverberg. This is the longest suspension ever given by the NHL for a hit on another player. Having never played another NHL game due to this suspension and thereafter being unsigned in free agency, Torres retired in November 2016.

== Playing career ==
=== Brampton Battalion ===
Torres played major junior with the Brampton Battalion of the Ontario Hockey League (OHL), beginning in 1998–99. He scored at a point-per-game pace in his rookie season with 35 goals and 62 points, second in team-scoring to Jason Spezza. Improving to a team-leading 43 goals and 91 points in his second junior season, he finished seventh in league scoring and was named to the OHL Second All-Star Team. Qualifying for the playoffs, the Battalion were eliminated in the first round. Torres added seven points in the six-game series.

Going into the 2000 NHL entry draft as a top prospect, Torres was selected in the first round, fifth overall, by the New York Islanders. The NHL Central Scouting Bureau described him as a player with some forechecking and offensive skills. The Islanders obtained the fifth overall pick used to acquire Torres from the Tampa Bay Lightning in exchange for goaltender Kevin Weekes and defensive prospect Kristian Kudroc.

At the time of the draft, Islanders general manager Mike Milbury told reporters Torres' chances of immediately joining the NHL was questionable. Following his first NHL training camp in New York, Torres was returned to Brampton in late September. Playing his third and final OHL season, Torres recorded 33 goals and 70 points over 55 games in 2000–01 and was named to the league's second all-star team again. The Battalion advanced to the second round of the playoffs, where they were eliminated. Torres had 11 points in eight post-season contests.

=== Professional ===
==== New York Islanders ====
After turning professional in 2001–02, Torres was assigned to the Islanders' American Hockey League (AHL) affiliate, the Bridgeport Sound Tigers following his second NHL training camp. Over the course of his professional rookie campaign, Torres was called up on four occasions to the NHL. He received his first call-up to New York on November 24, 2001, making his NHL debut against the Mighty Ducks of Anaheim. Skating on the fourth line, he helped the Islanders to a 5–3 win. He notched his first point during a separate call-up on January 4, 2002, assisting on a goal by Mark Parrish during a 4–2 win against the Pittsburgh Penguins. It was his lone point with the Islanders over 15 NHL games that season.

Later that month, he was reassigned to Bridgeport for the remainder of the season. He finished with 20 goals and 30 points over 55 games with the Sound Tigers. Torres became an integral part of Bridgeport's 2002 playoff run to the Calder Cup Finals, where the club lost in five games to the Chicago Wolves. Over 20 post-season games, Torres ranked third in team-scoring with eight goals and 17 points.

Torres began the 2002–03 season in Bridgeport for the second consecutive year. He received four call-ups to New York over the campaign, recording five assists over 17 games. At the NHL trade deadline, he was traded by the Islanders to the Edmonton Oilers, along with forward Brad Isbister, in exchange for defenceman Janne Niinimaa, as well as second-round and fourth-round selections in the 2003 draft.

==== Edmonton Oilers ====
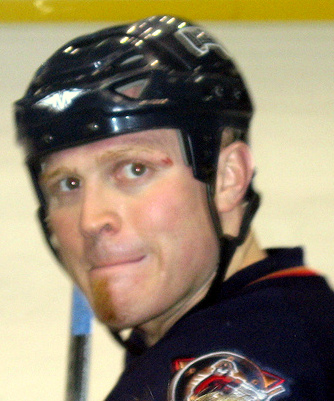
Torres while playing for the Edmonton Oilers in October 2006

Following the trade, the Oilers assigned him to their AHL affiliate, the Hamilton Bulldogs, where he played the final 11 games of the regular season. Between Bridgeport and Hamilton, Torres recorded 18 goals and 40 points over 60 games in his second AHL campaign. For the second consecutive year, he appeared in the Calder Cup Finals and lost. He struggled in his second AHL playoff run, managing six goals and an assist over 23 post-season games as the Bulldogs were defeated in the finals by the Houston Aeros in seven games. On August 1, 2003, Torres was re-signed by the Oilers to a two-year contract.

He began the 2003–04 season in the NHL, earning a roster spot with the Oilers. He scored his first NHL goal on October 9, 2003, against goaltender Evgeni Nabokov during a game against the San Jose Sharks. During the campaign, Torres was chosen to represent the Western Conference at the 2004 NHL YoungStars Game. The following month, he missed two contests due to an ankle injury. He recovered to finish the season with 20 goals and 34 points over 80 games. During the 2004–05 NHL lockout, he played with the Edmonton Road Runners (the Oilers' new minor league affiliate) of the AHL and tied for the team-scoring lead with Tony Salmelainen, recording 46 points in 67 games.

With the NHL set to resume play for the 2005–06 season, Torres re-signed with the Oilers to a two-year deal on August 16, 2005. Returning to the Oilers, he scored a career-high 27 goals and 41 points. The Oilers entered the 2006 playoffs as the eighth and final seed in the Western Conference. During the Western Conference Finals against the Mighty Ducks of Anaheim, Torres missed games two and three due to the flu. Following his return the lineup, he scored the series-clinching goal in game five, a 2–1 win, to advance the Oilers into the 2006 Stanley Cup Final. Against the Carolina Hurricanes, the Oilers faced a 3–1 series deficit before forcing a game seven. They were defeated in the deciding contest to lose the Stanley Cup. Torres notched four goals and 11 points over 22 post-season games.

In 2006–07, Torres recorded 15 goals and 34 points. The Oilers did not qualify for the playoffs. In the off-season, they re-signed him to a three-year, $6.75 million deal. The following season, he missed the last 49 games of the campaign to an anterior cruciate ligament injury. Limited to 32 contests, he recorded 11 points.

==== Columbus and Buffalo ====
Torres was traded in the off-season to the Columbus Blue Jackets in exchange for forward Gilbert Brulé on July 1, 2008. He missed 10 games to begin the 2008–09 campaign with a separated right shoulder. A month later, on December 2, 2008, he underwent surgery for an injured knee and missed an additional 19 games. With an injury-shortened season for the second consecutive year, he recorded 12 goals and 20 points over 51 games. In the 2009 playoffs, Torres added two assists as Columbus was swept in four games by the Detroit Red Wings.

The following season, on March 3, 2010, Torres was traded to the Buffalo Sabres in exchange for defenceman Nathan Paetsch and a second-round draft pick. He had recorded 19 goals and 31 points over 60 games with Columbus before the trade. In 14 games with Buffalo, he notched five assists. The Sabres entered the 2010 playoffs as the third seed in the Eastern Conference. They were eliminated in the first round by the Boston Bruins. Torres' play struggled against the Bruins and he was benched for the final two games of the series. He recorded two assists over four playoff games.

==== Vancouver Canucks ====
Leaving Buffalo as an unrestricted free agent, Torres signed a one-year, $1 million contract with the Vancouver Canucks on August 24, 2010. He scored his first goal as a Canuck on October 13, in a 4–3 loss to the Anaheim Ducks. The following month, he registered his first NHL career hat trick on November 2 during a game against his former team, the Edmonton Oilers. It marked the first time in Oilers history that a former player scored a hat trick against the club. The hat trick also helped Torres earn First Star of the Week honours as the best player in the NHL for the week ending November 7, 2010. Beginning in January 2011, he underwent a 23-game goalless streak, snapped on February 19 in a game against the Dallas Stars.

Later in the season, Torres was suspended four games for a hit to the head of Edmonton Oilers forward Jordan Eberle during a game on April 6, 2011. Canucks general manager Mike Gillis told media that he "strongly disagree[d] with it", while Torres argued that he did not stick out his elbow or leave his feet to make the hit and that Eberle raised his hand in defence of the oncoming check, indicating that it was not a blindside hit. Eberle was not injured on the play. The suspension ended Torres' regular season as the Canucks had two games remaining. He finished with 14 goals and 15 assists for 29 points in 80 games. Returning for Game 3 of the opening playoff round against the Chicago Blackhawks, Torres received further scrutiny around the league for a hit on Blackhawks' defenceman Brent Seabrook. Although he received a minor penalty on the play, Torres did not receive further suspension from the league. Later in the game, Torres hit Seabrook a second time, taking the defenceman out of the next two games due to concussion-like symptoms. Vancouver went on to win the series in seven games, before defeating the Nashville Predators and San Jose Sharks en route to the 2011 Stanley Cup Final. In the opening game of the Finals, Torres scored the game-winner and only goal of the game against the Boston Bruins with 19 seconds remaining in regulation. He would also record an assist on the only goal in Game 5 by Maxim Lapierre for another 1–0 win in the series for a 3–2 series lead. Despite being up 3–2 and having a chance to clinch the Stanley Cup in Game 6 in Boston, the Canucks would lose Game 6 5–2 along with the deciding Game 7 in Vancouver 4–0 to lose the series in seven games.

==== Phoenix and 25-game suspension ====
On July 1, 2011, Torres signed a two-year contract worth $3.5 million with the Phoenix Coyotes. He recorded his first goal nearly a month into the 2011–12 season, in a 3–2 shootout loss to the Dallas Stars on October 25, 2011. Torres continued to build a reputation for targeting opponents' heads. He was fined $2,500 for striking Jan Hejda in the head with his forearm in a December 29, 2011, game against the Colorado Avalanche. Two nights later, he struck Minnesota's Nate Prosser in the head after jumping into the hit, earning a two-game suspension.

In an April 17, 2012, game during Phoenix's first round playoff series against Chicago, Torres jumped into a hit that contacted Marian Hossa's head. Hossa was taken from the ice on a stretcher and sent to hospital by ambulance. While Torres was not penalized on the play, the NHL characterized the hit as violating league rules on interference, charging and illegal contact to the head. Citing his previous history, league disciplinarian Brendan Shanahan suspended Torres for 25 games for the hit—tied for the second-longest suspension for an on-ice incident in modern NHL history—sidelining Torres for the rest of the playoffs. The league reduced Torres' suspension to 21 games on appeal over the summer. He served 13 games of the suspension during the Stanley Cup playoffs and then missed the first 8 games of the 2012–13 NHL season, completing his suspension on February 1, 2013.

==== San Jose and 41-game suspension ====
On April 3, 2013, Torres was traded to the San Jose Sharks for a third-round draft pick in the 2013 draft. On April 16, 2013, Torres made his first shootout attempt in two years against the Los Angeles Kings to give the Sharks the 3–2 victory. Torres scored the game-winning goal in overtime of game two of round one against his former team, the Vancouver Canucks. The Sharks swept the series.

In game one of the second round of the 2013 Stanley Cup playoffs against the Kings, Torres recorded a hit on Jarret Stoll, injuring him. The hit was an illegal check to the head and Torres was a repeat offender; therefore, on May 16, the NHL suspended Torres for the remainder of the second round, which the Sharks lost. On June 20, 2013, the Sharks announced that they had re-signed Torres to a three-year contract. In the second 2013 preseason game against the Anaheim Ducks, Torres collided with Emerson Etem, causing Torres to injure his ACL, and was out until mid-February. Torres returned to the Sharks on February 27 against the Flyers. Torres recorded three points during the Sharks' opening round, seven game loss to the Los Angeles Kings in the 2014 Stanley Cup Playoffs. He then missed the entire 2014–15 NHL season due to requiring multiple surgeries on his knees .

On October 3, 2015, in a preseason game against the Ducks, Torres was assessed a match penalty for a late, illegal check to the head of forward Jakob Silfverberg. The NHL stated the hit would be under review, and, on October 5, Torres was suspended a record 41 games by the league, half of the regular season. Torres forfeited $440,860.29 in salary, which was deposited into the Players' Emergency Assistance Fund. While the record for longest suspension is held by Billy Coutu, who was suspended for life in 1927 for attacking referees, Torres holds the distinction of the longest non-lifetime ban, which was previously held by Chris Simon for an incident in 2007. This is also the longest-ever NHL suspension for a hit on another player. Torres did not appeal the suspension and apologized to Silfverberg. Sharks general manager Doug Wilson supported the suspension, saying Torres' hit was "unacceptable and has no place in our game."

After returning from his suspension, the Sharks assigned him to their AHL affiliate, the San Jose Barracuda on a conditioning loan. He never returned to the Sharks. On February 22, 2016, San Jose sent Torres to the Toronto Maple Leafs along with two second round draft picks in exchange for Roman Polak and Nick Spaling.

On August 30, 2016, Torres signed a PTO with the Carolina Hurricanes but was released on October 6. He officially announced his retirement from hockey on November 5, 2016.

== International play ==
Medal record

Representing Canada

Ice hockey

World Junior Championships
Bronze medal – third place	2001 Russia	

Torres represented Canada with the country's under-20 team at the 2001 World Junior Championships in Moscow. He scored three goals and five points over seven games as Canada won the bronze medal. They lost the semi-final to Finland before defeating Sweden 2–1 in the consolation game. Torres scored the game-winning goal against Sweden 37 seconds into overtime.

== Personal life ==
Torres was born in Toronto, Ontario, Canada, to Juan and Anna Torres. His father emigrated from Mexico City with his family in the early 1970s, while his mother is from Lima, Peru, and is of Greek, Italian, and Serbian ancestry. The two met in Toronto. Juan Torres worked several jobs to support his family, including car inspecting and assembly for General Motors, newspaper delivery for the Toronto Sun, construction and general contracting. Anna Torres stayed at home until after Torres and his siblings grew up, at which point she became a personal trainer. At one point, Torres' father became unemployed and the family applied to the Toronto Maple Leafs Foundation to financially support Torres' hockey career. Torres is the second youngest among his three brothers.

Torres is married to Gianna and they are residents of Whitchurch-Stouffville. He has two children.

== Career statistics ==
=== Regular season and playoffs ===
			Regular season					Playoffs
Season	Team	League	GP	G	A	Pts	PIM	GP	G	A	Pts	PIM
1997–98	Thornhill Rattlers	MetJHL	46	17	16	33	90	—	—	—	—	—
1998–99	Brampton Battalion	OHL	62	35	27	62	32	—	—	—	—	—
1999–2000	Brampton Battalion	OHL	68	43	48	91	40	6	5	2	7	23
2000–01	Brampton Battalion	OHL	55	33	37	70	76	8	7	4	11	19
2001–02	Bridgeport Sound Tigers	AHL	59	20	10	30	45	20	8	9	17	26
2001–02	New York Islanders	NHL	14	0	1	1	6	—	—	—	—	—
2002–03	Bridgeport Sound Tigers	AHL	49	17	15	32	54	—	—	—	—	—
2002–03	New York Islanders	NHL	17	0	5	5	10	—	—	—	—	—
2002–03	Hamilton Bulldogs	AHL	11	1	7	8	14	23	6	1	7	29
2003–04	Edmonton Oilers	NHL	80	20	14	34	65	—	—	—	—	—
2004–05	Edmonton Roadrunners	AHL	67	21	25	46	165	—	—	—	—	—
2005–06	Edmonton Oilers	NHL	82	27	14	41	50	22	4	7	11	16
2006–07	Edmonton Oilers	NHL	82	15	19	34	88	—	—	—	—	—
2007–08	Edmonton Oilers	NHL	32	5	6	11	36	—	—	—	—	—
2008–09	Columbus Blue Jackets	NHL	51	12	8	20	23	4	0	2	2	2
2009–10	Columbus Blue Jackets	NHL	60	19	12	31	32	—	—	—	—	—
2009–10	Buffalo Sabres	NHL	14	0	5	5	2	4	0	2	2	12
2010–11	Vancouver Canucks	NHL	80	14	15	29	78	23	3	4	7	28
2011–12	Phoenix Coyotes	NHL	79	15	11	26	83	3	1	1	2	2
2012–13	Phoenix Coyotes	NHL	28	5	7	12	13	—	—	—	—	—
2012–13	San Jose Sharks	NHL	11	2	4	6	4	5	1	0	1	2
2013–14	San Jose Sharks	NHL	5	3	2	5	7	7	2	1	3	18
2015–16	San Jose Barracuda	AHL	6	0	0	0	5	—	—	—	—	—
NHL totals			635	137	123	260	497	68	11	17	28	80

=== International ===
Year	Team	Event	Result	GP	G	A	Pts	PIM
2001	Canada	WJC	3rd place, bronze medalist(s)	7	3	2	5	10
Junior totals				7	3	2	5	10

Awards and achievements
Preceded by Rick DiPietro	New York Islanders first round pick 2000	Succeeded by Sean Bergenheim
