= 1993–94 MetJHL season =

- League: Metro Junior A Hockey League
- Sport: Hockey
- Duration: Regular season 1993–09 – 1994–02; Playoffs; 1994–02 – 1994–04
- Teams: 14
- Finals champions: Wexford Raiders

MetJHL seasons
- 1992–93 1994–95

The 1993–94 MetJHL season is the 3rd season of the Metro Junior A Hockey League (MetJHL). The 14 teams of the Fullan and Bauer Divisions competed in a 50-game schedule. The top 4 teams in each division made the playoffs.

The winner of the MetJHL playoffs, the Wexford Raiders, attended the Buckland Cup championship hosted by the team they beat in the league final, the Caledon Canadians. Caledon won the Buckland Cup as hosts, but lost the 1994 Dudley Hewitt Cup in Timmins, Ontario.

== Changes ==
- MetJHL joins Ontario Hockey Association.
- MetJHL joins Canadian Junior A Hockey League.
- Weston Dukes move and become Thornhill Islanders.
- Caledon Canadians join MetJHL from CJAHL.

== Final standings ==
Note: GP = Games played; W = Wins; L = Losses; OTL = Overtime losses; SL = Shootout losses; GF = Goals for; GA = Goals against; PTS = Points; x = clinched playoff berth; y = clinched division title; z = clinched conference title

Bauer Division
Team	GP	W	L	T	GF	GA	P
Wexford Raiders	50	36	11	3	283	157	75
Thornhill Islanders	50	30	18	2	253	206	62
Wellington Dukes	50	28	20	2	263	225	58
Kingston Voyageurs	50	26	21	3	216	207	55
Oshawa Legionaires	50	25	24	1	244	237	51
North York Rangers	50	12	32	6	213	306	30
Pickering Panthers	50	4	43	3	171	345	11
Fullan Division
Team	GP	W	L	T	GF	GA	P
Caledon Canadians	50	35	12	3	275	188	73
Muskoka Bears	50	28	14	8	246	183	64
St. Michael's Buzzers	50	25	19	6	249	204	56
Bramalea Blues	50	20	22	8	262	295	48
Aurora Tigers	50	20	26	4	235	268	44
Richmond Hill Riot	50	17	30	3	232	274	37
Mississauga Senators	50	17	31	2	213	260	36

== 1993–94 MetJHL Playoffs ==
Quarter-final

Wexford Raiders defeated Kingston Voyageurs 4-games-to-1
Thornhill Islanders defeated Wellington Dukes 4-games-to-1
Caledon Canadians defeated Bramalea Blues 4-games-to-2
Muskoka Bears defeated St. Michael's Buzzers 4-games-to-2

Semi-final

Wexford Raiders defeated Thornhill Islanders 4-games-to-none
Caledon Canadians defeated Muskoka Bears 4-games-to-2

Final

Wexford Raiders defeated Caledon Canadians 4-games-to-none

== 1994 Buckland Cup Championships ==
The event was hosted by the Caledon Canadians in North York, Ontario. The Caledon Canadians won the event, Wexford Raiders finished third in the round robin and did not advance.

Round Robin

Caledon Canadians defeated Wexford Raiders 4-2
Caledon Canadians defeated Powassan Hawks (NOJHL) 3-2 OT
Orillia Terriers (OPJHL) defeated Wexford Raiders 4-3 OT
Orillia Terriers (OPJHL) defeated Caledon Canadians 3-0
Wexford Raiders defeated Powassan Hawks (NOJHL) 4-3

Final

Caledon Canadians defeated Orillia Terriers (OPJHL) 3-1

== 1994 Dudley Hewitt Cup Championships ==
The event was hosted by the Timmins Golden Bears in Timmins, Ontario, Hearst, Ontario, and Kirkland Lake, Ontario. The Caledon Canadians lost in the semi-final.

Round Robin

Chateauguay Elites (QPJHL) defeated Caledon Canadians 5-4
Gloucester Rangers (CJHL) defeated Caledon Canadians 6-1
Caledon Canadians defeated Timmins Golden Bears (NOJHL) 4-2
Caledon Canadians defeated Thunder Bay Flyers (USHL) 3-1

Semi-final

Thunder Bay Flyers (USHL) defeated Caledon Canadians 4-3

== Players selected in 1994 NHL entry draft ==
- Rd 6 #132 Bates Battaglia - Mighty Ducks of Anaheim (Caledon Canadians)
- Rd 10 #250 Kevin Harper - St. Louis Blues (Wexford Raiders)

== See also ==
- 1994 Centennial Cup
- Dudley Hewitt Cup
- List of Ontario Hockey Association Junior A seasons
- Ontario Junior A Hockey League
- Northern Ontario Junior Hockey League
- 1993 in ice hockey
- 1994 in ice hockey

Preceded by 1992–93 MetJHL season	Ontario Hockey Association; Junior A seasons	Succeeded by 1994–95 MetJHL season
