= Jason Ward (ice hockey) =

Canadian ice hockey player (born 1979)

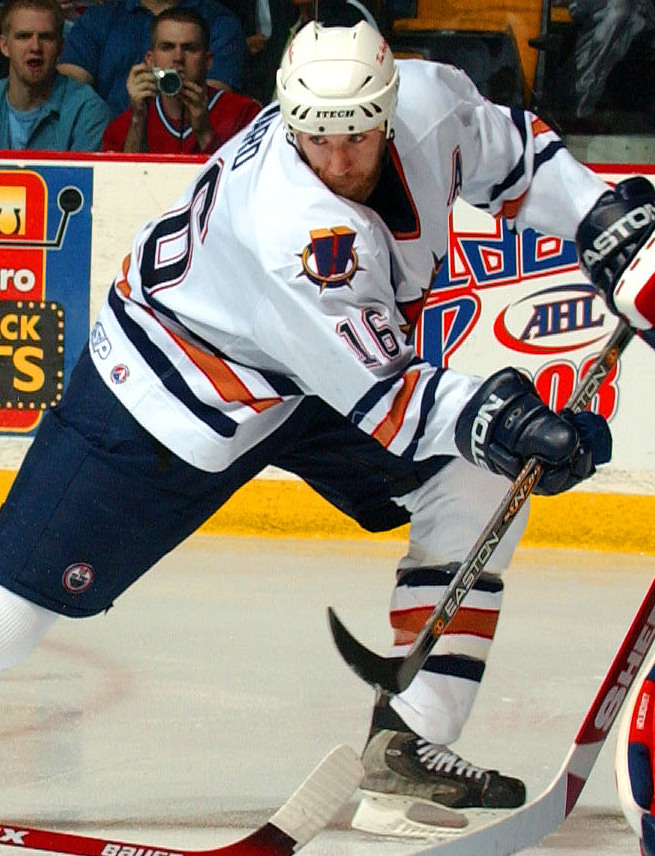
- Ward with the Hamilton Bulldogs in 2003
- Born: January 16, 1979 (age 47) Chapleau, Ontario, Canada
- Height: 6 ft 2 in (188 cm)
- Weight: 205 lb (93 kg; 14 st 9 lb)
- Position: Right wing
- Shot: Right
- Played for: Montreal Canadiens; New York Rangers; Los Angeles Kings; Tampa Bay Lightning; EHC Black Wings Linz
- NHL draft: 11th overall, 1997; Montreal Canadiens
- Playing career: 1999–2011

Jason Robert Ward (born January 16, 1979) is a Canadian former professional ice hockey right winger. He has played 336 games in the National Hockey League (NHL) with the Montreal Canadiens, New York Rangers, Los Angeles Kings, and Tampa Bay Lightning. He was born in Chapleau, Ontario.

== Playing career ==
Ward was drafted 11th overall by the Montreal Canadiens in the 1997 NHL entry draft. He played 186 career NHL games with the Montreal Canadiens, the New York Rangers and the Los Angeles Kings, scoring 20 goals and 28 assists for 48 points. When he was traded to the Kings, the deal sent agitator Sean Avery to the Rangers providing them boost for a playoff push. On February 27, 2007, he was traded to the Tampa Bay Lightning in exchange for a fifth-round pick in the 2007 NHL entry draft, making the third time he was traded during the 2006–07 season. He scored his first Lightning goal in his debut with the team.

After completing the 2009–10 season in the American Hockey League with the Philadelphia Flyers affiliate Adirondack Phantoms, Ward was unable to garner a new NHL contract for the following 2010–11 season. In order to maintain game shape, Ward voluntarily took on a position as an assistant coach for the major junior team Brampton Battalion of the Ontario Hockey League while on the lookout for a new contract. On November 15, 2010, Ward signed a one-year contract and played his last professional season with Austrian team EHC Black Wings Linz of the EBEL.

Ward has the distinction of scoring his first NHL goal, in his first NHL game, on his first NHL shot, all three milestones coming at Madison Square Garden against Mike Richter and the New York Rangers on December 3, 1999.

== Career statistics ==
=== Regular season and playoffs ===
| | | | Regular season | | | | | Playoffs |
| Season | Team | League | GP | G | A | Pts | PIM | GP | G | A | Pts | PIM |
|---|---|---|---|---|---|---|---|---|---|---|---|---|
| 1994–95 | Oshawa Legionaires | MetJHL | 47 | 30 | 31 | 61 | 75 | — | — | — | — | — |
| 1995–96 | Niagara Falls Thunder | OHL | 64 | 15 | 35 | 50 | 139 | 10 | 6 | 4 | 10 | 23 |
| 1996–97 | Erie Otters | OHL | 58 | 25 | 39 | 64 | 137 | 5 | 1 | 2 | 3 | 2 |
| 1997–98 | Erie Otters | OHL | 21 | 7 | 9 | 16 | 42 | — | — | — | — | — |
| 1997–98 | Windsor Spitfires | OHL | 26 | 19 | 27 | 46 | 34 | — | — | — | — | — |
| 1997–98 | Fredericton Canadiens | AHL | 7 | 1 | 0 | 1 | 2 | 1 | 0 | 0 | 0 | 2 |
| 1998–99 | Windsor Spitfires | OHL | 12 | 8 | 11 | 19 | 25 | — | — | — | — | — |
| 1998–99 | Plymouth Whalers | OHL | 23 | 14 | 13 | 27 | 28 | 11 | 6 | 8 | 14 | 2 |
| 1998–99 | Fredericton Canadiens | AHL | — | — | — | — | — | 10 | 4 | 2 | 6 | 22 |
| 1999–00 | Montreal Canadiens | NHL | 32 | 2 | 1 | 3 | 10 | — | — | — | — | — |
| 1999–00 | Québec Citadelles | AHL | 40 | 14 | 12 | 26 | 30 | 3 | 2 | 1 | 3 | 4 |
| 2000–01 | Montreal Canadiens | NHL | 12 | 0 | 0 | 0 | 12 | — | — | — | — | — |
| 2000–01 | Québec Citadelles | AHL | 23 | 7 | 12 | 19 | 69 | — | — | — | — | — |
| 2001–02 | Québec Citadelles | AHL | 78 | 24 | 33 | 57 | 128 | 3 | 0 | 0 | 0 | 2 |
| 2002–03 | Montreal Canadiens | NHL | 8 | 3 | 2 | 5 | 0 | — | — | — | — | — |
| 2002–03 | Hamilton Bulldogs | AHL | 69 | 31 | 41 | 72 | 78 | 23 | 12 | 9 | 21 | 20 |
| 2003–04 | Montreal Canadiens | NHL | 53 | 5 | 7 | 12 | 21 | 5 | 0 | 2 | 2 | 2 |
| 2003–04 | Hamilton Bulldogs | AHL | 2 | 0 | 3 | 3 | 17 | — | — | — | — | — |
| 2004–05 | Hamilton Bulldogs | AHL | 77 | 20 | 34 | 54 | 66 | 4 | 2 | 1 | 3 | 2 |
| 2005–06 | New York Rangers | NHL | 81 | 10 | 18 | 28 | 44 | 1 | 0 | 0 | 0 | 2 |
| 2006–07 | New York Rangers | NHL | 46 | 4 | 6 | 10 | 26 | — | — | — | — | — |
| 2006–07 | Los Angeles Kings | NHL | 7 | 0 | 1 | 1 | 4 | — | — | — | — | — |
| 2006–07 | Tampa Bay Lightning | NHL | 17 | 4 | 4 | 8 | 10 | 6 | 0 | 1 | 1 | 6 |
| 2007–08 | Tampa Bay Lightning | NHL | 79 | 8 | 6 | 14 | 42 | — | — | — | — | — |
| 2008–09 | Tampa Bay Lightning | NHL | 1 | 0 | 0 | 0 | 2 | — | — | — | — | — |
| 2008–09 | Norfolk Admirals | AHL | 21 | 2 | 7 | 9 | 16 | — | — | — | — | — |
| 2009–10 | Adirondack Phantoms | AHL | 56 | 12 | 17 | 29 | 30 | — | — | — | — | — |
| 2010–11 | EHC Linz | AUT | 35 | 9 | 10 | 19 | 50 | 5 | 0 | 1 | 1 | 26 |
| 2013–14 | Dundas Real McCoys | ACH | 5 | 3 | 5 | 8 | 0 | 8 | 4 | 6 | 10 | 4 |
| 2013–14 | Dundas Real McCoys | AC | — | — | — | — | — | 4 | 1 | 5 | 6 | 12 |
| 2015–16 | Hamilton Steelhawks | ACH | 7 | 1 | 2 | 3 | 2 | — | — | — | — | — |
| AHL totals | | | 373 | 111 | 159 | 270 | 436 | 44 | 20 | 13 | 33 | 52 |
| NHL totals | | | 336 | 36 | 45 | 81 | 171 | 12 | 0 | 3 | 3 | 10 |

=== International ===
| Year | Team | Event | GP | G | A | Pts | PIM |
|---|---|---|---|---|---|---|---|
| 1998 | Canada | WJC | 7 | 1 | 0 | 1 | 2 |
| 1999 | Canada | WJC | 7 | 1 | 1 | 2 | 8 |
| Junior totals | | | 14 | 2 | 1 | 3 | 10 |

Awards and achievements
| Preceded by Matt Higgins | Montreal Canadiens first-round draft pick 1997 | Succeeded by Eric Chouinard |
