= 1994–95 MetJHL season =

- League: Metro Junior A Hockey League
- Sport: Hockey
- Duration: Regular season 1994-09 – 1995-02; Playoffs; 1995-02 – 1995-04
- Number of teams: 14
- Finals champions: Caledon Canadians

MetJHL seasons
- ← 1993–94 1995–96 →

The 1994–95 MetJHL season is the 4th season of the Metro Junior A Hockey League (MetJHL). The 14 teams of the Eastern and Western Divisions competed in a 50-game schedule. The top 4 teams in each division made the playoffs.

The winner of the MetJHL playoffs, the Caledon Canadians, failed to win the 1995 Buckland Cup as Ontario Hockey Association champions or Dudley Hewitt Cup as Central Canadian champions.

== Changes ==
- None of note.

== Final standings ==
Note: GP = Games played; W = Wins; L = Losses; OTL = Overtime losses; SL = Shootout losses; GF = Goals for; GA = Goals against; PTS = Points; x = clinched playoff berth; y = clinched division title; z = clinched conference title

Bauer Division
Team	GP	W	L	T	GF	GA	P
Thornhill Islanders	50	35	14	1	244	151	71
Wellington Dukes	50	27	18	5	234	191	59
Wexford Raiders	50	25	21	4	257	158	54
Kingston Voyageurs	50	21	24	5	241	219	47
North York Rangers	50	20	27	3	207	219	43
Oshawa Legionaires	49	18	30	1	199	240	37
Pickering Panthers	49	10	37	2	161	331	22
Fullan Division
Team	GP	W	L	T	GF	GA	P
Caledon Canadians	50	42	3	5	289	134	89
Aurora Eagles	50	26	17	7	232	177	59
St. Michael's Buzzers	50	26	18	6	230	203	58
Mississauga Senators	50	23	24	3	249	271	49
Muskoka Bears	50	23	26	1	256	223	47
Bramalea Blues	50	17	31	2	199	249	36
Richmond Hill Riot	50	12	35	3	151	234	27

== 1994-95 MetJHL Playoffs ==
Quarter-final

Thornhill Islanders defeated Kingston Voyageurs 4-games-to-none
Wexford Raiders defeated Wellington Dukes 4-games-to-2
Caledon Canadians defeated Mississauga Chargers 4-games-to-none
St. Michael's Buzzers defeated Aurora Eagles 4-games-to-2

Semi-final

Wexford Raiders defeated Thornhill Islanders 4-games-to-3
Caledon Canadians defeated St. Michael's Buzzers 4-games-to-none

Final

Caledon Canadians defeated Wexford Raiders 4-games-to-none

== 1995 Dudley Hewitt Cup and Buckland Cup Championships ==
Event was hosted by the Thunder Bay Flyers in Thunder Bay, Ontario. The Caledon Canadians finished in third by losing the semi-final.

Round Robin

Brampton Capitals (OPJHL) defeated Caledon Canadians 4-1
Thunder Bay Flyers (USHL) defeated Caledon Canadians 6-3
Caledon Canadians defeated Timmins Golden Bears 7-5

Semi-final

Thunder Bay Flyers (USHL) defeated Caledon Canadians 7-1

== See also ==
- 1995 Centennial Cup
- Dudley Hewitt Cup
- List of Ontario Hockey Association Junior A seasons
- Ontario Junior A Hockey League
- Northern Ontario Junior Hockey League
- 1994 in ice hockey
- 1995 in ice hockey

Preceded by 1993–94 MetJHL season	Ontario Hockey Association; Junior A seasons	Succeeded by 1995–96 MetJHL season
