= 1995 Centennial Cup =

1995 Manitoba Centennial Cup
Tournament details
- Venue: Gloucester, Ontario
- Dates: May 1995
- Teams: 5

Final positions
- Champions: Calgary Canucks (1st title)
- Runners-up: Gloucester Rangers

Tournament statistics
- Games played: 13
- Scoring leader: Calvin Chartrand (Winnipeg South)

Awards
- MVP: Mitch Grant (Winnipeg South)

The 1995 Centennial Cup was the 25th Junior "A" 1995 ice hockey National Championship for the Canadian Junior A Hockey League.

The Centennial Cup was competed for by the winners of the Doyle Cup, Anavet Cup, Dudley Hewitt Cup, the Fred Page Cup and the host city.

The tournament was hosted by the Gloucester Rangers in Gloucester, Ontario.

== The playoffs ==
=== Round robin ===
Pos	League (Ticket)	Team	Pld	W	L	GF	GA	GD	Qualification
1	AJHL (Doyle Cup)	Calgary Canucks	4	3	1	15	10	+5	Semi-final
2	CJHL (Host)	Gloucester Rangers	4	2	2	19	12	+7	Semi-final
3	MJHL (Anavet Cup)	Winnipeg South Blues	4	2	2	17	18	−1	Semi-final
4	USHL (Dudley Hewitt Cup)	Thunder Bay Flyers	4	2	2	14	16	−2	Semi-final
5	LHJAAAQ (Fred Page Cup)	Joliette Nationals	4	1	3	7	16	−9	

==== Results ====
Gloucester Rangers defeat Joliette Nationals 7-0
Winnipeg South Blues defeat Thunder Bay Flyers 6-4
Calgary Canucks defeat Joliette Nationals 1-0 by rule challenge (Originally won by Joliette 5-1)
Gloucester Rangers defeat Winnipeg South Blues 6-2
Calgary Canucks defeat Thunder Bay Flyers 6-0
Calgary Canucks defeat Gloucester Rangers 5-4
Joliette Nationals defeat Winnipeg South Blues 5-3
Thunder Bay Flyers defeat Gloucester Rangers 5-2
Winnipeg South Blues defeat Calgary Canucks 6-3 for the Abbott Cup
Thunder Bay Flyers defeat Joliette Nationals 5-2

=== Semis and finals ===
Semi-finals
1	Calgary Canucks	5
4	Thunder Bay Flyers	3
2	Gloucester Rangers	4
3	Winnipeg South Blues	1

Royal Bank Cup Finals
1	Calgary Canucks	5
2	Gloucester Rangers	4

Note: The final was won in overtime

== Awards ==
Most Valuable Player: Mitch Grant (Winnipeg South Blues)
Top Scorer: Calvin Chartrand (Winnipeg South Blues)
Most Sportsmanlike Player: Curtis Bois (Thunder Bay Flyers)

=== All-Star Team ===
Forward

Curtis Bois (Thunder Bay Flyers)
Mitch Grant (Winnipeg South Blues)
Craig Fitzgerald (Gloucester Rangers)

Defence

Mitchell Ferguson (Calgary Canucks)
Luc Bilodeau (Joliette Nationals)

Goal

Brian Greer (Gloucester Rangers)

== Roll of League Champions ==
AJHL: Calgary Canucks
BCHL: Chilliwack Chiefs
CJHL: Cornwall Colts
MJHL: Winnipeg South Blues
MJAHL: Moncton Beavers
MetJHL: Caledon Canadians
NOJHL: Timmins Golden Bears
OPJHL: Brampton Capitals
QPJHL: Joliette Nationals
RMJHL: Cranbrook Colts
SJHL: Weyburn Red Wings

== See also ==
- Canadian Junior A Hockey League
- Royal Bank Cup
- Anavet Cup
- Doyle Cup
- Dudley Hewitt Cup
- Fred Page Cup
- Abbott Cup
- Mowat Cup

== Sources ==
- Saelhof, Todd (16 May 2024). "'An unbelievable feeling': Calgary Canucks OT hero Jason Abramoff recalls 1995 Centennial Cup triumph". Calgary Herald. Postmedia.
- "1995 Centennial Cup Calgary Canucks set to be inducted into the Alberta Hockey Hall of Fame". Calgary Canucks. 20 June 2025.
- "2025 Induction Class". Alberta Hockey Hall of Fame.
