= 1992–93 MetJHL season =

- League: Metro Junior A Hockey League
- Sport: Hockey
- Duration: Regular season 1992-09 – 1993-02; Playoffs; 1993-02 – 1993-05
- Teams: 13
- Finals champions: Wexford Raiders

MetJHL seasons
- 1991–92 1993–94

The 1992–93 MetJHL season is the 2nd season of the Metro Junior A Hockey League (MetJHL). The 13 teams of the Fullan and Bauer Divisions competed in a 48-game schedule. The top 6 teams in each division made the playoffs.

The winner of the MetJHL playoffs, the Wexford Raiders, could not proceed further in the National playdowns as the MetJHL was not a member of the Ontario Hockey Association. However, the Raiders were permitted to play a 2-game series for charity against the OHA's Central Junior League's champion, the Barrie Colts. The Raiders won both games.

== Changes ==
- Aurora Eagles join MetJHL from CJBHL.
- Mimico Monarchs move and become the Richmond Hill Riot.
- Thornhill Thunderbirds move and become the Mississauga Senators.
- Richmond Hill Rams move and become the North York Rangers.

== Final standings ==
Note: GP = Games played; W = Wins; L = Losses; OTL = Overtime losses; SL = Shootout losses; GF = Goals for; GA = Goals against; PTS = Points; x = clinched playoff berth; y = clinched division title; z = clinched conference title

Bauer Division
| Team | GP | W | L | T | GF | GA | P |
| Wexford Raiders | 48 | 36 | 9 | 3 | 213 | 118 | 75 |
| Wellington Dukes | 48 | 28 | 17 | 3 | 248 | 188 | 59 |
| North York Rangers | 48 | 23 | 24 | 1 | 197 | 215 | 47 |
| Kingston Voyageurs | 48 | 17 | 29 | 2 | 162 | 204 | 36 |
| Richmond Hill Riot | 48 | 17 | 29 | 2 | 214 | 245 | 36 |
| Oshawa Legionaires | 48 | 16 | 29 | 3 | 196 | 237 | 35 |
| Pickering Panthers | 48 | 13 | 30 | 5 | 198 | 292 | 31 |
Fullan Division
| Team | GP | W | L | T | GF | GA | P |
| Muskoka Bears | 48 | 27 | 17 | 4 | 251 | 223 | 58 |
| St. Michael's Buzzers | 48 | 26 | 16 | 6 | 234 | 190 | 56 |
| Mississauga Senators | 48 | 25 | 18 | 5 | 212 | 177 | 55 |
| Aurora Eagles | 48 | 24 | 22 | 2 | 227 | 221 | 50 |
| Bramalea Blues | 48 | 22 | 22 | 4 | 251 | 243 | 48 |
| Weston Dodgers | 48 | 15 | 27 | 6 | 203 | 253 | 36 |

== 1992-93 MetJHL Playoffs ==
Preliminary

Aurora Eagles defeated Bramalea Blues 3-games-to-1
Richmond Hill Riot defeated Kingston Voyageurs 3-games-to-none

Quarter-final

Muskoka Bears defeated Aurora Eagles 4-games-to-2
St. Michael's Buzzers defeated Mississauga Senators 4-games-to-2
Wexford Raiders defeated Richmond Hill Riot 4-games-to-none
Wellington Dukes defeated North York Rangers 4-games-to-none

Semi-final

St. Michael's Buzzers defeated Muskoka Bears 4-games-to-none
Wexford Raiders defeated Wellington Dukes 4-games-to-none

Final

Wexford Raiders defeated St. Michael's Buzzers 4-games-to-1

== Exhibition Series vs. CJAHL ==
The Barrie Colts of the OHA's Central Junior A League and the Wexford Raiders of the Metro League played a pair of exhibition games head-to-head for charity. The purpose of the games was to match the probably champions of the two leagues head-to-head to see where each league's talent level stood if the OHA was to allow both leagues in as sanctioned Junior A leagues for the 1993–94 season. Wexford won both games by narrow margins, but the second game was marred by an incident involving a fight, initiated by the Barrie Colts, that spilled into the crowd.

Wexford Raiders defeated Barrie Colts (CJAHL) 7-6
Wexford Raiders defeated Barrie Colts (CJAHL) 4-3

== Players selected in 1993 NHL entry draft ==
- Rd 4 #97 John Jakopin - Detroit Red Wings (St. Michael's Buzzers)
- Rd 8 #195 Thom Cullen - New Jersey Devils (Wexford Raiders)
- Rd 8 #198 Travis Dillabough - Los Angeles Kings (Wexford Raiders)

== See also ==
- 1993 Centennial Cup
- Dudley Hewitt Cup
- List of Ontario Hockey Association Junior A seasons
- Ontario Junior Hockey League
- Northern Ontario Junior Hockey League
- 1992 in ice hockey
- 1993 in ice hockey

| Preceded by 1991–92 MetJHL season | Ontario Hockey Association; Junior A seasons | Succeeded by 1993–94 MetJHL season |
