= 1991–92 MetJHL season =

- League: Metro Junior A Hockey League
- Sport: Hockey
- Duration: Regular season 1991-09 – 1992-02; Playoffs; 1992-02 – 1992-05
- Teams: 12
- Finals champions: Wexford Raiders

MetJHL seasons
- 1990–91 Metro Jr. B 1992–93

The 1991–92 MetJHL season is the 1st season of the Metro Junior A Hockey League (MetJHL). The 12 teams of the Fullan and Bauer Divisions competed in a 44-game schedule. The top 6 teams in each division made the playoffs.

The winner of the MetJHL playoffs, the Wexford Raiders, could not proceed further in the National playdowns as the MetJHL was not a member of the Ontario Hockey Association.

== Changes ==
- MetJHL promotes itself from Junior B to Junior A.
- Henry Carr Crusaders move and become Weston Dukes.
- Markham Thunderbirds move and become Thornhill Thunderbirds.

== Final standings ==
Note: GP = Games played; W = Wins; L = Losses; OTL = Overtime losses; SL = Shootout losses; GF = Goals for; GA = Goals against; PTS = Points; x = clinched playoff berth; y = clinched division title; z = clinched conference title

Bauer Division
| Team | GP | W | L | T | GF | GA | P |
| Thornhill Thunderbirds | 44 | 36 | 6 | 2 | 245 | 113 | 74 |
| Wexford Raiders | 44 | 34 | 8 | 2 | 197 | 121 | 70 |
| Kingston Voyageurs | 44 | 30 | 12 | 2 | 225 | 147 | 62 |
| Wellington Dukes | 44 | 19 | 22 | 3 | 180 | 194 | 41 |
| Pickering Panthers | 44 | 13 | 28 | 3 | 190 | 235 | 29 |
| Oshawa Legionaires | 44 | 10 | 32 | 2 | 158 | 252 | 22 |
Fullan Division
| Team | GP | W | L | T | GF | GA | P |
| Muskoka Bears | 44 | 23 | 19 | 2 | 224 | 233 | 48 |
| Bramalea Blues | 44 | 20 | 21 | 3 | 238 | 233 | 43 |
| Richmond Hill Rams | 44 | 20 | 21 | 3 | 206 | 197 | 43 |
| St. Michael's Buzzers | 44 | 18 | 21 | 5 | 222 | 221 | 41 |
| Weston Dodgers | 44 | 15 | 26 | 3 | 207 | 230 | 33 |
| Mimico Monarchs | 44 | 9 | 31 | 4 | 238 | 243 | 22 |

== 1991-92 MetJHL Playoffs ==
Preliminary

St. Michael's Buzzers defeated Weston Dodgers 3-games-to-none
Pickering Panthers defeated Wellington Dukes 3-games-to-none

Quarter-final

Muskoka Bears defeated St. Michael's Buzzers 4-games-to-3
Bramalea Blues defeated Richmond Hill Rams 4-games-to-1
Thornhill Thunderbirds defeated Pickering Panthers 4-games-to-none
Wexford Raiders defeated Kingston Voyageurs 4-games-to-1

Semi-final

Bramalea Blues defeated Muskoka Bears 4-games-to-none
Wexford Raiders defeated Thornhill Thunderbirds 4-games-to-2

Final

Wexford Raiders defeated Bramalea Blues 4-games-to-none

== Players selected in 1992 NHL entry draft ==
- Rd 5 #106 Chris DeRuiter - Toronto Maple Leafs (Kingston Voyageurs)
- Rd 10 #220 Anson Carter - Quebec Nordiques (Wexford Raiders)
- Rd 10 #225 Steve Halko - Hartford Whalers (Thornhill Thunderbirds)

== See also ==
- 1992 Centennial Cup
- Dudley Hewitt Cup
- List of Ontario Hockey Association Junior A seasons
- Ontario Junior Hockey League
- Northern Ontario Junior Hockey League
- 1991 in ice hockey
- 1992 in ice hockey

| Preceded by 1990–91 Metro Junior B | Ontario Hockey Association; Junior A seasons | Succeeded by 1992–93 MetJHL season |
