= List of Ontario Hockey Association Junior A seasons =

OHA Junior "A"
SOJHL	(1970-1977)
OPJHL	(1972–1987)
MetJHL	(1991-1998)
OJHL	(1993–Present)
- Ontario Hockey Association
- Canadian Junior Hockey League

This is a list of Ontario Hockey Association Junior A seasons since the inception of modern Junior A hockey in 1970.

== History ==
In 1970, in Ontario, what would become the Ontario Hockey League vacated the rank of Junior A and declared itself "Major Junior" and eventually became separate from OHA jurisdiction. The remaining Junior A leagues in Ontario remained at the Junior A level, such as the Thunder Bay Junior A Hockey League of the Thunder Bay Amateur Hockey Association, the Northern Ontario Junior Hockey Association of the Northern Ontario Hockey Association, and the Central Junior A Hockey League of the Ottawa District Hockey Association. The departure of the Ontario Major Junior Hockey League left the Ontario Hockey Association with no available Junior A league. An independent league, the Western Ontario Junior A Hockey League, was negotiated with and eventually joined the OHA as the Southern Ontario Junior A Hockey League. In 1972, a rival league was created for the SOJHL called the Ontario Provincial Junior A Hockey League, the OPJHL was created by taking the top teams from the Metro Junior B Hockey League. In 1977 the SOJHL folded and in 1981 the OPJHL became the Ontario Junior Hockey League. This league dwindled in size and folded in 1987.

In 1989, the Metro Junior B Hockey League left the OHA because the OHA refused to promote it to Junior A. In 1991, the Metro declared itself Junior A. The Metro was a founding member of the Canadian Junior A Hockey League in 1993 and rejoined the OHA, only to leave again in 1995 and then rejoin in 1997. In 1992, the Central Junior B Hockey League was given Junior A status by the OHA but continued to play at the Junior B level until 1993 when it was renamed the Ontario Provincial Junior A Hockey League and joined the CJAHL. In 1998, the MetJHL and OPJHL merged to create a single 37-team super-league. In 2008, the OPJHL was renamed the Ontario Junior Hockey League, but was dissolved in the summer of 2009.

Starting in 2009, there are two Junior A leagues in the OHA: the Central Canadian Hockey League and the Ontario Junior A Hockey League.

== SOJHL seasons ==
1970–71 | 1971–72 | 1972–73 | 1973–74 | 1974–75 | 1975–76 | 1976–77

WOJHL seasons

1968–69* | 1969–70*

(*) denotes season where league was independent of OHA.

== OPJHL/OJHL (1972-1987) seasons ==
1972–73 | 1973–74 | 1974–75 | 1975–76 | 1976–77 | 1977–78 | 1978–79 | 1979–80 | 1980–81 | 1981–82 | 1982–83 | 1983–84 | 1984–85 | 1985–86 | 1986–87

== MetJHL seasons ==
1991–92* | 1992–93* | 1993–94 | 1994–95 | 1995–96* | 1996–97* | 1997–98

(*) denotes season where league was independent of OHA.

== OPJHL/OJHL (1993–Present) seasons ==
1992–93* | 1993–94 | 1994–95 | 1995–96 | 1996–97 | 1997–98 | 1998–99 | 1999–00 | 2000–01 | 2001–02 | 2002–03 | 2003–04 | 2004–05 | 2005–06 | 2006–07 | 2007–08 | 2008–09 | 2009-10 CCHL/OJAHL | 2010–11 | 2011–12 | 2012–13 | 2013–14 | 2014–15 | 2015–16 | 2016–17 | 2017–18 | 2018–19 | 2019-20 | 2020-21 | 2021-22

(*) denotes league was known as Central Junior A League within OHA, despite there being a Central Junior A Hockey League in the Ottawa District Hockey Association. The league competed in the OHA's Junior B playoffs instead of the Junior A national playdowns.

== See also ==
- List of OPJHL Standings (1972-1981)
- List of OJHL Standings (1981-1987)
- Ontario Junior Hockey League
- Canadian Junior Hockey League
- Dudley Hewitt Cup
- Royal Bank Cup
