= Raimo Mähönen =

Finnish politician

Raimo Aulis Mähönen (born 18 March 1938 in Harlu) is a Finnish politician. He was a member of the Parliament of Finland from 1995 to 2003, representing the Social Democratic Party of Finland (SDP).
