= Oona Kivelä =

Finnish dancer (born 1983)

Oona Kivelä (born in 1983) is a Finnish professional acrobat and a four-time world champion pole dancer.

Oona Kivelä started doing gymnastics at the age of nine. She competed in gymnastics until the age of 24. In 2008 – at the age of 25 – Kivelä became interested in pole dance in New York City, after having read an article about pole dance in Finland half year before. In 2011, Oona Kivelä won both Finnish championship in pole dance as well as the international Pole Art 2011 championship.

Oona Kivelä designs the choreography for her performances herself.

She has also done modeling for various sports magazines starring the cover pages.

The pole champion has also done collab work with acrobat Santeri Koivisto. The project, For Your Eyes Only by Kingdom Helsinki consists in a glamorous and exclusive act that mixes pole dancing, acrobatics, hand balancing and contortion.

== Notable achievements ==
- Winner – International Pole Art Competition, 2009
- Winner – Pole Dance North-European Championships, 2009
- Winner – Finnish Pole Dance Championships, 2010
- Winner – Pole World Cup, 2011
- Winner – International Pole Art Competition, 2011
- Winner – Pole Art, 2012
- Winner – International Pole Championship, 2012
- Winner – International Pole Championship, 2013
- Winner – International Pole Championship, 2014
- Winner – International Pole Championship, 2015
- Winner – Finnish Pole Dance Championships, 2016
