= Kewin Orellana =

Swiss ice hockey player

- Born: January 8, 1992 (age 34) Lausanne, Switzerland
- Height: 5 ft 10 in (178 cm)
- Weight: 165 lb (75 kg; 11 st 11 lb)
- Position: Defence
- Shot: Left
- Played for: SC Bern; HC Sierre; HC La Chaux-de-Fonds; Villars HC; Forward-Morges HC; Star-Forward HC
- Playing career: 2011–2019

Kewin Orellana (born January 8, 1992) is a Swiss professional ice hockey defenceman. He is currently playing for the SC Bern of Switzerland's National League A.

== Career statistics ==
			Regular season					Playoffs
Season	Team	League	GP	G	A	Pts	PIM	GP	G	A	Pts	PIM
2004–05	HC Fribourg-Gottéron U15	Mini Top	—	—	—	—	—	—	—	—	—	—
2004–05	Lausanne HC U15	Mini Top	—	—	—	—	—	—	—	—	—	—
2006–07	Lausanne HC U17	Novizen Top	23	0	8	8	22	—	—	—	—	—
2007–08	Lausanne HC U17	Novizen Top	24	4	11	15	46	—	—	—	—	—
2007–08	Lausanne HC U20	Elite Jr. A	16	1	4	5	4	11	0	0	0	4
2007–08	Lausanne HC II U20	Junioren Top	2	0	0	0	6	—	—	—	—	—
2008–09	Lausanne HC U17	Novizen Top	11	2	4	6	26	—	—	—	—	—
2008–09	Lausanne HC U20	Elite Jr. A	29	0	5	5	24	12	1	4	5	14
2009–10	Lausanne HC U20	Elite Jr. A	30	4	11	15	66	—	—	—	—	—
2010–11	SC Bern Future U20	Elite Jr. A	18	0	3	3	6	—	—	—	—	—
2011–12	SC Bern Future U20	Elite Jr. A	26	4	12	16	10	4	0	2	2	0
2011–12	SC Bern	NLA	1	0	0	0	0	—	—	—	—	—
2011–12	HC Sierre	NLB	4	0	2	2	2	—	—	—	—	—
2012–13	HC Sierre	NLB	21	1	2	3	12	—	—	—	—	—
2012–13	HC La Chaux-de-Fonds	NLB	—	—	—	—	—	5	0	0	0	0
2012–13	Villars HC	SwissDiv1	3	0	1	1	0	—	—	—	—	—
2013–14	Forward-Morges HC	SwissDiv1	9	3	6	9	6	8	1	3	4	6
2014–15	Forward-Morges HC	SwissDiv1	28	0	6	6	18	10	1	4	5	8
2015–16	Forward-Morges HC	SwissDiv1	8	0	2	2	2	9	0	0	0	12
2018–19	Star-Forward HC	MSL	16	0	2	2	22	—	—	—	—	—
NLA totals			1	0	0	0	0	—	—	—	—	—
NLB totals			25	1	4	5	14	5	0	0	0	0
SwissDiv1 totals			48	3	15	18	26	27	2	7	9	26
