= Aki Kivelä =

Finnish ice hockey player

- Born: April 4, 1992 (age 33) Helsinki, Finland
- Height: 5 ft 11 in (180 cm)
- Weight: 181 lb (82 kg; 12 st 13 lb)
- Position: Right wing
- Shot: Right
- Played for: BeWe TuusKi; SaPKo; HIFK
- NHL draft: Undrafted
- Playing career: 2011–2012

Aki Kivelä (born April 4, 1992) is a Finnish former ice hockey player.

Kivelä made his SM-liiga debut playing with HIFK during the 2011–12 SM-liiga season.
