= Krister Mähönen =

Finnish ice hockey player (born 1992)

- Born: January 30, 1992 (age 33); Vahto, Finland
- Height: 6 ft 0 in (183 cm)
- Weight: 192 lb (87 kg; 13 st 10 lb)
- Position: Forward
- Shoots: Left
- SM-liiga team: HC TPS
- Playing career: 2013–present

Krister Mähönen (born January 30, 1992) is a Finnish ice hockey player. His is currently playing with HC TPS in the Finnish SM-liiga.

Mahonen made his SM-liiga debut playing with HC TPS during the 2012–13 SM-liiga season.
