= 1994 in ice hockey =

The following is a chronicle of events during the year 1994 in ice hockey.

== Olympics ==
In Ice hockey at the 1994 Winter Olympics, Sweden defeated Canada in a shootout as Peter Forsberg scored the gold-medal clinching goal. Finland won the bronze medal, defeating Russia by a 4–0 mark. Slovakia's Žigmund Pálffy finished as the scoring champion.

== National Hockey League ==
- Art Ross Trophy as the NHL's leading scorer during the regular season: Wayne Gretzky, Los Angeles Kings
- Hart Memorial Trophy: for the NHL's Most Valuable Player: Sergei Fedorov, Detroit Red Wings
- Stanley Cup - New York Rangers defeat the Vancouver Canucks in the 1994 Stanley Cup Final
- The Florida Panthers selected Ed Jovanovski with the first pick overall in the 1994 NHL Draft

== Canadian Hockey League ==
- Ontario Hockey League: The North Bay Centennials defeated the Detroit Junior Red Wings and captured the J. Ross Robertson Cup.
- Quebec Major Junior Hockey League: The Chicoutimi Saguenéens won the President's Cup (QMJHL) for the second time in franchise history.
- Western Hockey League: The Kamloops Blazers won the President's Cup (WHL) for the fifth time
- Memorial Cup: The Laval Titan served as host team for the 1994 Memorial Cup, which was won by the Kamloops Blazers

== International hockey ==
Canada beat Finland in a shootout to capture gold at the 1994 Men's Ice Hockey World Championships, winning their first gold since 1961. Sweden's Mats Sundin won the scoring championship. Games in the Championship Group A tournament were held from 25 April to 8 May 1994, played in Bolzano, Canazei and Milan.

== Women's hockey ==
- Canada defeated the United States to capture the gold medal at the 1994 IIHF Women's World Championship.

== Minor League hockey ==
- American Hockey League: The Portland Pirates defeated the Moncton Hawks to win their first Calder Cup in franchise history. Goaltender Olaf Kolzig won the Jack A. Butterfield Trophy
- International Hockey League: The Atlanta Knights defeated the Fort Wayne Komets for their only Turner Cup win in franchise history.

== Season articles ==
1993–94 NHL season	1994–95 NHL season
1993–94 AHL season	1994–95 AHL season

== Deaths ==
- James Bedard: February 2
- Bill Mosienko: July 9
- Aud Tuten: January 14

== See also ==
- 1994 in sports
