= Durham Huskies (1996–2001) =

- City: Durham, Ontario, Canada
- League: Ontario Provincial Junior A Hockey League; Metro Junior A Hockey League
- Operated: 1996-2001
- Home arena: Durham Community Centre
- Colours: Blue, Red, Grey, and White
- General manager: Dennis Graham
- Head coach: Jon Antonopolis; Brian Warrilow; Jamie Petrie
- Affiliates: Owen Sound Platers (OHL); Mount Forest Patriots (WOJCHL)

The Durham Huskies were a Junior "A" ice hockey team from the town of Durham, Ontario, Canada. The Huskies played in the Metro Junior A Hockey League for two seasons and the Ontario Provincial Junior A Hockey League for three seasons. The Huskies were a continuance of the Traditional Durham Huskies Senior/Intermediate team that existed from 1920 until 1992.

== A Junior Hockey Revival ==
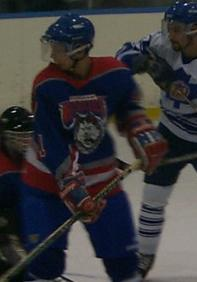
Durham Huskies versus rival Markham Waxers (1998)

=== Preface ===
After the demise of the Sr. Huskies, Durham decided to pursue a Junior hockey team. From the early days the team was dubbed the Huskies as well, all they had to do was find a league to play in. The Huskies had no chance to play in Junior Development as it was a league that depended on close locale and the closest team to Durham was Seaforth, over 80 kilometers away. They tried Jr. "C" and were turned down for political reasons involving the player drawing availability of potential rival teams: the Hanover Barons and Mount Forest Patriots. Midwestern Junior B and Provincial Jr. "A" did not work out either. As a last resort, the Huskies attempted to join the on-again off-again renegade Metro Junior A Hockey League.

=== Metro Junior "A" ===
In 1996 they were successful, and they joined a league spanning the entire Province of Ontario with teams in the States of New York and Pennsylvania. Although the Jr. "A" Huskies never did obtain a winning season, the highlight of their junior hockey stint may have been their 1998 playoff run. The Huskies entered the playoffs in second place in the Central Division and drew the always potent Markham Waxers. The series was penalty and fight filled, but ultimately the Huskies walked away with a 3-games-to-1 series win. In the divisional final, the Huskies drew the Caledon Canadians and were swept by one of the best Junior A teams of the 1990s 3-games-to-none. Although they did not advance further, the desire and skill shown by the Huskies directly resulted in 9 members of the team being drafted into the Ontario Hockey League that summer. Sadly, as many made their respective OHL teams or moved on to college, from this point on the Huskie roster would never reach to those heights again. After 2 seasons in the "Metro", the league folded and the team was allowed into the super-competitive Ontario Provincial Junior A Hockey League.

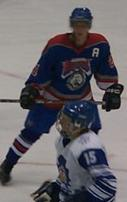

On a sidenote, the Huskies, while in the Metro, notoriously became the first team in hockey history to have two goals scored on them by a goaltender in one hockey game. This event occurred in a game against the Muskoka Bears on February 21, 1997. Goaltender Ryan Venturelli scored the empty net goals at 8:55 and 10:34 of the third period. The Bears defeated the Huskies that night by a score of 11-6.

=== The OPJHL ===
Playing against a stronger calibre of teams like the Collingwood Blues, Newmarket Hurricanes, Brampton Capitals, and the Georgetown Raiders, by the end of the Huskies three-year stint in Provincial Jr. "A" League it became obvious that the team could no longer competitively compete. In 2001, the Huskies officially left the OPJHL. Some of the reasons revolved around poor attendance, poor results at such a high level, and lack of resources to pay expensive league and travelling fees. The team also was developing a notoriety around the league for being a "bush league" team. Their last season in the OPJHL was not memorable to say the least. This assessment could easily reflected by their exhibition results before the season even started: a pair of losses to the Owen Sound Greys of the Midwestern Junior B Hockey League and a loss to a Juvenile "AAA" team from the Eastern AAA Hockey League. The Huskies went into hiatus just before the start of the next season, all the players' rights were released, the Huskies were inert again.

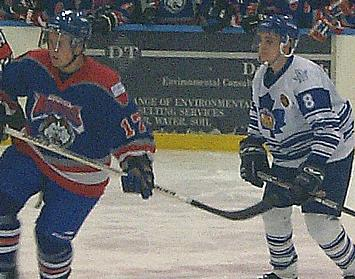
Scott Hastings versus the Markham Waxers (1998)

=== Aftermath ===
Many former Huskies went on to prosper in other leagues. Anthony Donskov reached the NCAA where he played for the Miami Red Hawks of the Central Collegiate Hockey Association. Bob Crummer went on to the Guelph Storm of the Ontario Hockey League and had a brief ECHL semi-pro career. Tyler Murray later played in the Central Junior A Hockey League for the Brockville Braves and the Ottawa Jr. Senators before a brief semi-pro career. David Bilik, who came to the Huskies from the disbanded Pittsburgh Jr. Penguins, went on to play for the Pensacola Ice Pilots of the ECHL. Steve Howard eventually became a Semi-Pro journeyman, spending time in the ECHL and the Colonial Hockey League. Andy Peters spent four years playing NCAA with Bentley College. Enforcer Kevin Shanahan played a season of semi-pro with the Motor City Snipers of the International Independent Hockey League. Bradley Bartlett, who came to the Huskies in 2000 after his past team the Thunder Bay Flyers folded, moved on to play two seasons of Canadian Interuniversity Sport Hockey with Lakehead University. Andrej Blasko found his way up to the semi-pro ranks as well. Anthony Child, a player of British descent, was traded to the Collingwood Blues after two seasons with Durham. He spent his Christmas seasons in his Husky years playing in Pool B of the World Junior Ice Hockey Championships as a member of the British national ice hockey team. He later moved on to play a brief professional career with the Romford Raiders of the English Premier Ice Hockey League. Josh Ciocco played for the Huskies in 1999–2000, but moved on to the British Columbia Hockey League the next year. From 2003 until 2007, Ciocco played hockey for the University of New Hampshire. He played his first professional hockey in the 2006–07 season with the Wheeling Nailers of the ECHL. Ryan Hoover moved on to play for the Hamilton Kilty B's and journeyed to Texas to play in CHL but was unable to continue due to concussions. Travis Clock ended up playing in both the OHL and QMJHL, then semi-pro with the Orlando Seals, and Senior AAA in 2006–07 with the Windsor St. Clair Saints.

Despite not winning any championships, what the team did do was provide a forum for local talent to compete at high levels, gaining the town and its hometown boys like Mike Nixon, Scott Baines, Jim MacGillvray, Dave Galbraith, Kyle Phillips, Andy Aitken, Paul Brown, Devan Mighton, Sandy Mackenzie, Jesse Rycroft (who played semi-pro for the United Hockey League's Kalamazoo Wings), and Will Hill recognition in the local hockey world.

The Huskies spawned one National Hockey League alumnus in Kurtis McLean who played briefly for the New York Islanders. His later career has been in Europe, including the Kontinental Hockey League. Former Huskie goalie Greg Blais also found success in Britain's Elite Ice Hockey League and France's Ligue Magnus.

The Huskies went on hiatus in 2001 to attempt to join the local Western Junior C league to better fit in with competition, but again the team was thwarted by the league's political landscape. Little is known about the future of the franchise, if there is to be one.

== The End of the Huskies? ==
The Husky moniker has been adopted for the 2005-06 season by the town's local Juvenile Minor Hockey Team in the WOAA. As of right now, there is no known effort to return the Huskies back to a higher level of hockey. It is doubtful that this is the last the town of Durham will see of the Husky franchise, but the team seems to be dead in the water for the time being. As of 2006-07, the OPJHL's Oshawa Legionnaires became the Durham Fury, which will play out of the Campus Ice Center in Oshawa, Ontario. Although it was unlikely that the Huskies would have ever re-entered the OPJHL, as their recent efforts were to join the Western Junior "C" League, the creation of the Fury would definitely be a rumour-killer for an OPJHL comeback.

== Season-by-season record ==
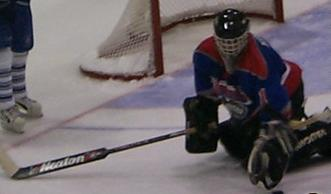
Husky Tyler Murray (1998)

Note: GP = Games Played, W = Wins, L = Losses, T = Ties, OTL = Overtime Losses, GF = Goals for, GA = Goals against

Season	GP	W	L	T	OTL	GF	GA	Points	Finish	Playoffs
1996-97	50	13	37	0	-	201	317	26	14th Metro A	Lost in First Round
1997-98	50	19	29	2	-	194	232	40	11th Metro A	Lost in Second Round
1998-99	51	9	35	3	4	156	292	25	11th OPJHL-C	Out of Playoffs
1999-00	49	5	39	3	2	132	338	15	8th OPJHL-N	Out of Playoffs
2000-01	49	7	35	5	2	137	288	21	8th OPJHL-N	Lost in First Round
Totals	249	53	175	13	8	820	1467	--	0.255	--

=== Playoffs ===
- 1997 Lost Preliminary

Aurora Tigers defeated Durham Huskies 4-games-to-none

- 1998 Lost quarter-final

Durham Huskies defeated Markham Waxers 3-games-to-1
Caledon Canadians defeated Durham Huskies 3-games-to-none

== Notable alumni ==
- Kurtis McLean
