= Shelburne Wolves =

Canadian junior ice hockey team

- City: Shelburne, Ontario, Canada
- League: Metro Junior A Hockey League; Ontario Provincial Junior A Hockey League
- Operated: 1995-1999
- Home arena: Shelburne Community Centre
- Colours: Red, Yellow, and Black

Franchise history
- 1995-1996: Shelburne Hornets
- 1996-1999: Shelburne Wolves

The Shelburne Wolves were a Junior "A" ice hockey team from Shelburne, Ontario, Canada. This defunct hockey team was a part of the Metro Junior A Hockey League and Ontario Provincial Junior A Hockey League.

== History ==
In the late 1990s, the Metro Junior A Hockey League pushed North. In 1995, they brought in the Shelburne Hornets who were affiliated with the then operational Hockey Training Institute (HTI). After the 1995/1996 season the Hornets rebranded themselves and were labeled the Wolves. Despite the fervour for hockey in the town of Shelburne, the Hornets/Wolves were never overly competitive and subsequently folded after four seasons. Even though the Hornets/Wolves had short history, its club was filled with many NHL hopefuls, although none ever made any full NHL rosters.

== Season-by-season results ==
Season	GP	W	L	T	OTL	GF	GA	P	Results	Playoffs
1995-96	52	5	44	3	-	160	383	13	12th Metro A	DNQ
1996-97	50	10	37	3	-	213	348	23	15th Metro A	
1997-98	50	12	34	4	-	189	287	28	14th Metro A	
1998-99	51	10	35	4	2	171	314	26	10th OPJHL-C	

=== Playoffs ===
MetJHL Years

- 1996 DNQ
- 1997 DNQ
- 1998 Lost Preliminary

Oshawa Legionaires defeated Shelburne Wolves 3-games-to-none

OJHL Years

== Notable alumni ==
- Max Birbraer
- Nick Smith
