= Caledon Canadians =

- City: Caledon, Ontario, Canada
- League: Ontario Provincial Junior A Hockey League; Metro Junior A Hockey League
- Operated: 1992-1999
- Home arena: Caledon Community Centre
- Colours: Red, Blue, and White

The Caledon Canadians are a defunct Junior "A" ice hockey team from Caledon, Ontario, Canada. They were a part of the Metro Junior A Hockey League and were the only team in the "Metro" to win an Ontario Hockey Association Junior "A" Championship.

== History ==
The Canadians took the place of the old Caledon Flyers. The Flyers played in Caledon from 1976 until 1990 in the Mid-Ontario Junior C Hockey League. In 1990, the team folded but after two seasons the Central Junior B Hockey League granted the town a new team.

The Canadians spent one season in the Central Junior "B" Hockey League before joining the Metro and one season after with the Ontario Provincial Junior A Hockey League. The Canadians were owned by a creator of Trivial Pursuit, but folded the very successful team after a long feud with the Caledon City Council who controlled the local arena.

In the 1994-95 season, the Canadians were ranked "Number 1" by the Canadian Junior A Hockey League as the top Tier II Junior "A" hockey team in all of Canada. After winning the Metro Junior "A" title, they lost out to the Brampton Capitals of the Ontario Provincial Junior A Hockey League in a Round Robin for the Ontario Hockey Association title. The other competitor in the championship was the Timmins Golden Bears of the Northern Ontario Junior Hockey League.

=== 1994 OHA Champions ===
In the 1993-94 Playoffs, the Canadians made it all the way to the Metro finals but were swept by the Wexford Raiders 4-games-straight. The ace in the hole was that the Canadians had already been granted hosting duties for the OHA Championship. Up against the Orillia Terriers, Powassan Hawks, and Wexford, the Canadians made the final and defeated the Terriers 3-1 to win a berth into the Dudley Hewitt Cup. At the Central Canadian in Timmins, Ontario, the Canadians bowed out in the Semi-final with a 4-3 overtime loss to the Thunder Bay Flyers. The Flyers were defeated by the Chateauguay Elites of the Quebec Junior AAA Hockey League in the Dudley Hewitt Cup Final.

== Season-by-season results ==
Season	GP	W	L	T	OTL	GF	GA	P	Results	Playoffs
1992-93	49	31	15	3	-	265	171	66	6th CJBHL	
1993-94	50	35	12	3	-	275	188	73	2nd Metro A	Lost Final, Won OHA Title
1994-95	50	42	3	5	-	289	134	89	1st Metro A	Won League
1995-96	52	35	13	4	-	283	179	74	2nd Metro A	Won League
1996-97	50	41	7	2	-	318	145	84	2nd Metro A	
1997-98	50	40	4	6	-	319	123	86	1st Metro A	
1998-99	51	16	30	2	3	203	271	37	9th OPJHL-W	

=== Playoffs ===
- 1994 Lost Final, Hosted and Won OHA Buckland Cup, Lost Dudley Hewitt Cup semi-final

Caledon Canadians defeated Bramalea Blues 4-games-to-2
Caledon Canadians defeated Muskoka Bears 4-games-to-2
Wexford Raiders defeated Caledon Canadians 4-games-to-none
Second in Buckland Cup round robin (2-1)
Caledon Canadians defeated Orillia Terriers 3-1 in final BUCKLAND CUP CHAMPIONS
Fourth in Dudley Hewitt Cup round robin (2-2)
Thunder Bay Flyers (USHL) defeated Caledon Canadians 4-3 in semi-final

- 1995 Won League, Lost Dudley Hewitt Cup semi-final

Caledon Canadians defeated Mississauga Senators 4-games-to-none
Caledon Canadians defeated St. Michael's Buzzers 4-games-to-none
Caledon Canadians defeated Wexford Raiders 4-games-to-none METJHL CHAMPIONS
Third in Dudley Hewitt Cup round robin (1-2)
Thunder Bay Flyers defeated Caledon Canadians 7-1 in semi-final

- 1996 Won League

Caledon Canadians defeated Muskoka Bears 4-games-to-2
Caledon Canadians defeated Niagara Scenic 4-games-to-none
Caledon Canadians defeated Thornhill Islanders 4-games-to-3 METJHL CHAMPIONS

- 1997 Lost Final

Caledon Canadians defeated Muskoka Bears 4-games-to-none
Fourth in round robin quarter-final (3-2-1)
Caledon Canadians defeated Wexford Raiders 4-games-to-none
Aurora Tigers defeated Caledon Canadians 4-games-to-none

- 1998 Lost Final

Caledon Canadians defeated Durham Huskies 3-games-to-none
Caledon Canadians defeated Syracuse Jr. Crunch 4-games-to-3
Wexford Raiders defeated Caledon Canadians 4-games-to-3

== Notable alumni ==
- Bates Battaglia
- Nick Boynton
- Sheldon Keefe
- Dainius Zubrus
