= Ben Hutton =

Canadian ice hockey player (born 1993)

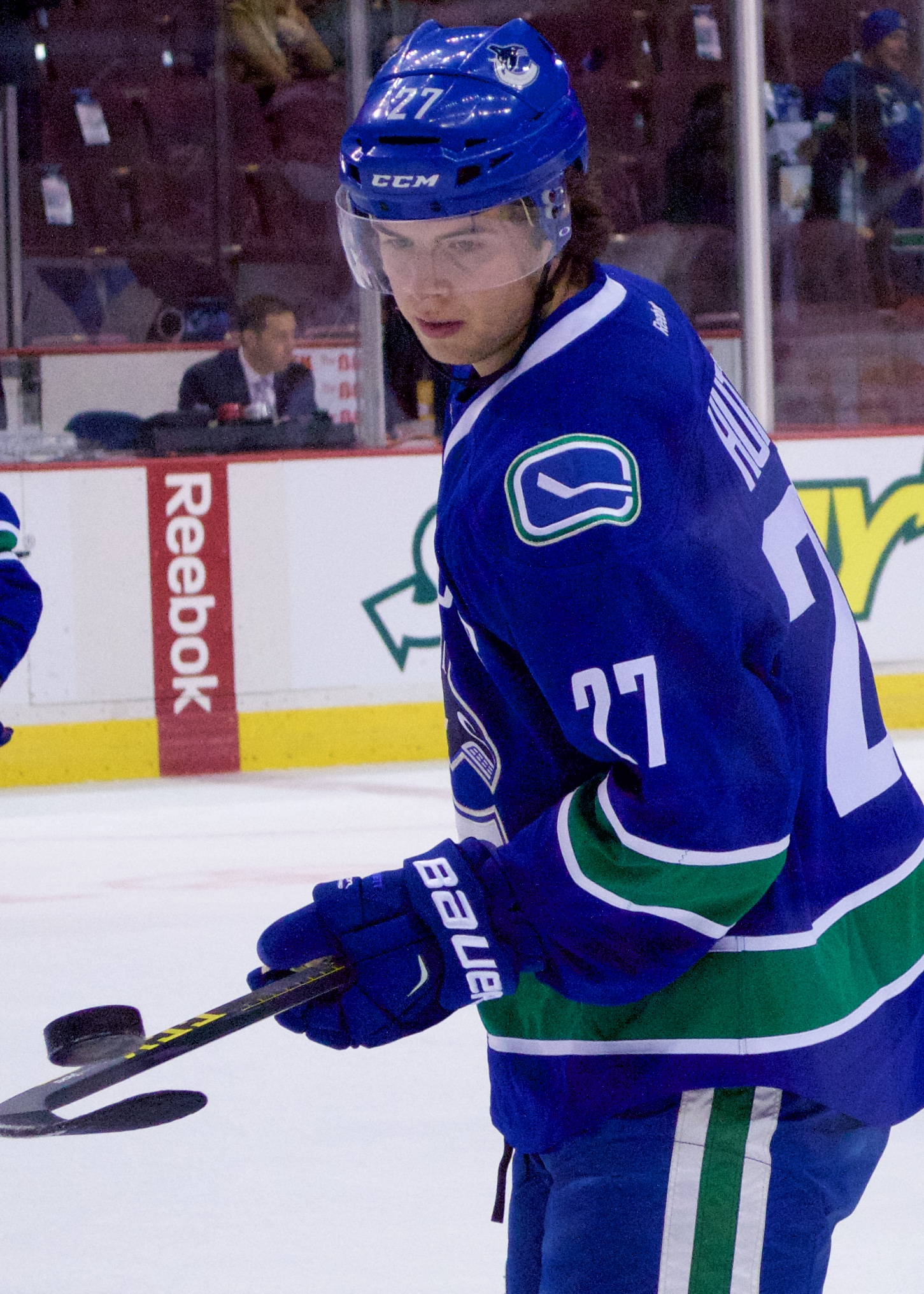
- Hutton with Vancouver Canucks in 2015
- Born: April 20, 1993 (age 33) Brockville, Ontario, Canada
- Height: 6 ft 2 in (188 cm)
- Weight: 207 lb (94 kg; 14 st 11 lb)
- Position: Defence
- Shoots: Left
- NHL team Former teams: New York Islanders; Vancouver Canucks; Los Angeles Kings; Anaheim Ducks; Toronto Maple Leafs; Vegas Golden Knights
- National team: Canada
- NHL draft: 147th overall, 2012; Vancouver Canucks
- Playing career: 2015–present

Ben Hutton (born April 20, 1993) is a Canadian professional ice hockey player who is a defenceman for the New York Islanders of the National Hockey League (NHL). Hutton was selected 147th overall in the fifth round of the 2012 NHL entry draft by the Vancouver Canucks, with whom he played the first four seasons of his NHL career, and has also played for the Los Angeles Kings, Anaheim Ducks, Toronto Maple Leafs, and Vegas Golden Knights. Hutton won the Stanley Cup with Vegas in 2023.

Hutton played Junior A in the Central Canada Hockey League before attending the University of Maine, where he earned All-Hockey East First Team honours. Internationally, he won gold with Team Canada at the 2016 IIHF World Championship.

== Playing career ==
=== College ===
Hutton played for the Maine Black Bears in the NCAA Men's Division I Hockey East conference. In his second year, Hutton's outstanding play was rewarded with a selection to the 2013–14 All-Hockey East first team.

=== Professional ===
==== Vancouver Canucks (2015–2019) ====
Hutton signed a two-year, entry-level contract with the Vancouver Canucks on March 16, 2015, after finishing his college career at the University of Maine. He made the Canucks' opening-night roster for the 2015–16 season and recorded his first NHL point in his debut on October 7, 2015, against the Calgary Flames.

Hutton lead all Canucks defencemen in scoring during his rookie season with 25 points in 75 games. At the conclusion of the season, he was awarded the Walter "Babe" Pratt Trophy as the team's most outstanding defenceman. Following his successful rookie campaign, Hutton was named to Team Canada for the 2016 IIHF World Championship, where he won a gold medal.

Over the next three seasons, Hutton remained a consistent fixture on the Canucks' blue line, appearing in 276 total games for the franchise and logging significant minutes in a top-four defensive role before becoming a free agent in 2019.

==== Los Angeles Kings (2019–2020) ====
On September 17, 2019, Hutton signed a one-year, $1.5 million contract as an unrestricted free agent with the Los Angeles Kings.

During the 2019–20 NHL season, Hutton established himself as a reliable veteran presence on the Kings' blue line, appearing in 65 games and recording 16 points. He ranked among the team's leaders in blocked shots and average time on ice (TOI), frequently playing over 18 minutes per game in a top-four pairing role before the season was truncated due to the COVID-19 pandemic.

==== Anaheim Ducks (2021) ====
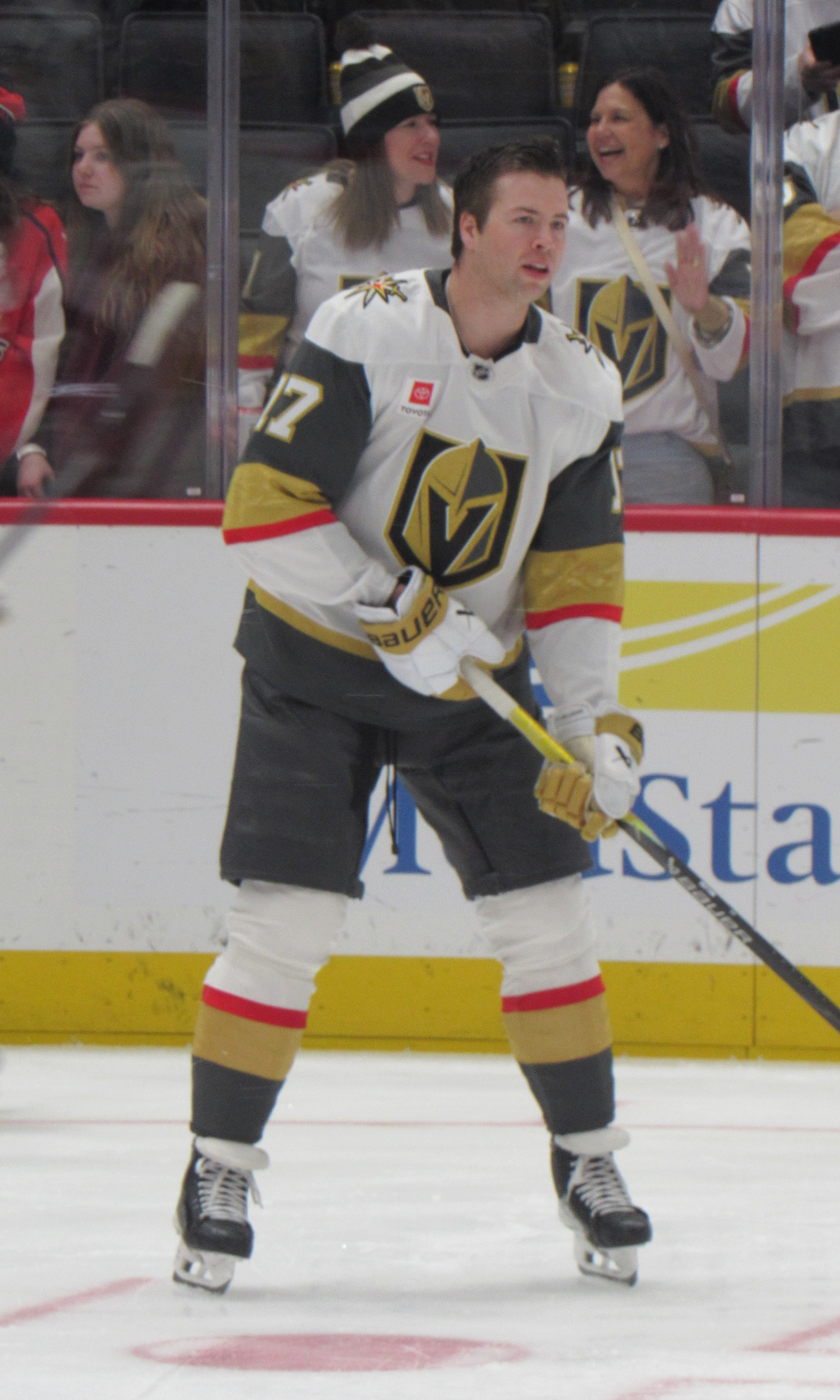
Hutton with the Golden Knights in 2026

On January 15, 2021, Hutton signed a one-year contract with the Anaheim Ducks after joining the team during training camp. He provided defensive depth for the Ducks, appearing in 34 games and recording five points while logging steady minutes in the bottom pairing.

==== Toronto Maple Leafs (2021) ====
On April 12, 2021, Hutton was acquired by the Toronto Maple Leafs at the NHL trade deadline in exchange for a fifth-round draft pick. The acquisition was intended to bolster the team's defensive depth ahead of the 2021 Stanley Cup playoffs. Hutton made his debut for the organization in a 4–1 victory against the Vancouver Canucks and provided experienced coverage on the blue line for the duration of the regular season schedule.

==== Vegas Golden Knights (2021–2026) ====
On October 28, 2021, Hutton signed a one-year contract with the Vegas Golden Knights. He recorded his 100th career NHL point on March 4, 2022, in a victory over the Anaheim Ducks, and signed a two-year contract extension the following day.

During the 2022–23 NHL season, Hutton was a member of the Golden Knights team that won the Stanley Cup, defeating the Florida Panthers in five games. He appeared in two series-clinching victories during the playoff run against the Winnipeg Jets and Edmonton Oilers. Following the championship, he brought the Stanley Cup to his hometown of Prescott, Ontario.

On December 22, 2023, the Golden Knights signed Hutton to a further two-year contract extension. In the 2025–26 NHL season, Hutton saw an increase in offensive production, recording 6 goals and 15 points through 53 games, his highest goal total since the 2018–19 season.

==== New York Islanders (2026–present) ====
On September 17, 2026, Hutton signed a professional tryout agreement (PTO) with the Ottawa Senators, joining them for their training camp and preseason. On September 28, the final cut-down day for rosters, Hutton was released.

On November 2, Hutton was signed to a PTO by the New York Islanders. Three days later, on November 5, he signed a one-year contract with the Islanders through the remainder of the 2026–27 season.

== International play ==
Medal record

Men's ice hockey

Representing Canada

World Championships
Gold medal – first place	2016 Russia	

Representing Canada East

World Junior A Challenge
Silver medal – second place	2011 Canada	

Hutton represented Canada East at the 2011 World Junior A Challenge. He scored a goal and two assists in four games as Canada East won silver, losing to Canada West in the gold medal game.

Hutton represented Canada national team at the 2016 World Championship, alongside Vancouver Canucks teammate Christopher Tanev. Hutton won a gold medal in the tournament as Canada defeated Finland 2–0 in the final.

== Personal life ==
Hutton was born in Brockville and raised in Prescott, Ontario.

Hutton is married to Emma Hutton; the couple wed in 2024. They have one daughter, Honey, born in October 2025. He is the son of Jim and Janet Hutton and has one sister, Maggie. He owns two dogs, Scout and Franny. They reside in Ottawa.

== Career statistics ==
=== Regular season and playoffs ===
			Regular season					Playoffs
Season	Team	League	GP	G	A	Pts	PIM	GP	G	A	Pts	PIM
2008–09	Kemptville 73's	CJHL	4	0	0	0	0	—	—	—	—	—
2009–10	Kemptville 73's	CJHL	60	16	18	34	6	4	0	0	0	2
2010–11	Kemptville 73's	CCHL	61	8	27	35	28	—	—	—	—	—
2011–12	Kemptville 73's	CCHL	35	7	20	27	25	—	—	—	—	—
2011–12	Nepean Raiders	CCHL	22	4	12	16	6	18	5	8	13	6
2012–13	University of Maine	HE	34	4	11	15	18	—	—	—	—	—
2013–14	University of Maine	HE	35	15	14	29	8	—	—	—	—	—
2014–15	University of Maine	HE	39	9	12	21	14	—	—	—	—	—
2014–15	Utica Comets	AHL	4	1	0	1	2	—	—	—	—	—
2015–16	Vancouver Canucks	NHL	75	1	24	25	14	—	—	—	—	—
2016–17	Vancouver Canucks	NHL	71	5	14	19	31	—	—	—	—	—
2017–18	Vancouver Canucks	NHL	61	0	6	6	23	—	—	—	—	—
2018–19	Vancouver Canucks	NHL	69	5	15	20	43	—	—	—	—	—
2019–20	Los Angeles Kings	NHL	65	4	12	16	14	—	—	—	—	—
2020–21	Anaheim Ducks	NHL	34	1	4	5	11	—	—	—	—	—
2020–21	Toronto Maple Leafs	NHL	4	0	0	0	0	—	—	—	—	—
2021–22	Vegas Golden Knights	NHL	58	3	10	13	32	—	—	—	—	—
2022–23	Vegas Golden Knights	NHL	31	3	5	8	6	2	0	0	0	0
2023–24	Vegas Golden Knights	NHL	41	2	8	10	17	1	0	0	0	0
2024–25	Vegas Golden Knights	NHL	11	0	2	2	0	—	—	—	—	—
2025–26	Vegas Golden Knights	NHL	55	6	9	15	19	7	0	1	1	4
NHL totals			575	30	109	139	210	10	0	1	1	4

=== International ===
Year	Team	Event	Result	GP	G	A	Pts	PIM
2011	Canada East	WJAC	2nd place, silver medalist(s)	4	1	2	3	2
2016	Canada	WC	1st place, gold medalist(s)	5	0	1	1	0
Junior totals				4	1	2	3	2
Senior totals				5	0	1	1	0

== Awards and honours ==
Award	Year	Ref
College
All-Hockey East First Team	2014	
AHCA East Second-Team All-American	2014	
NHL
Stanley Cup champion	2023	
Vancouver Canucks
Babe Pratt Trophy	2016	
