= Kyle Baun =

Canadian ice hockey player (born 1992)

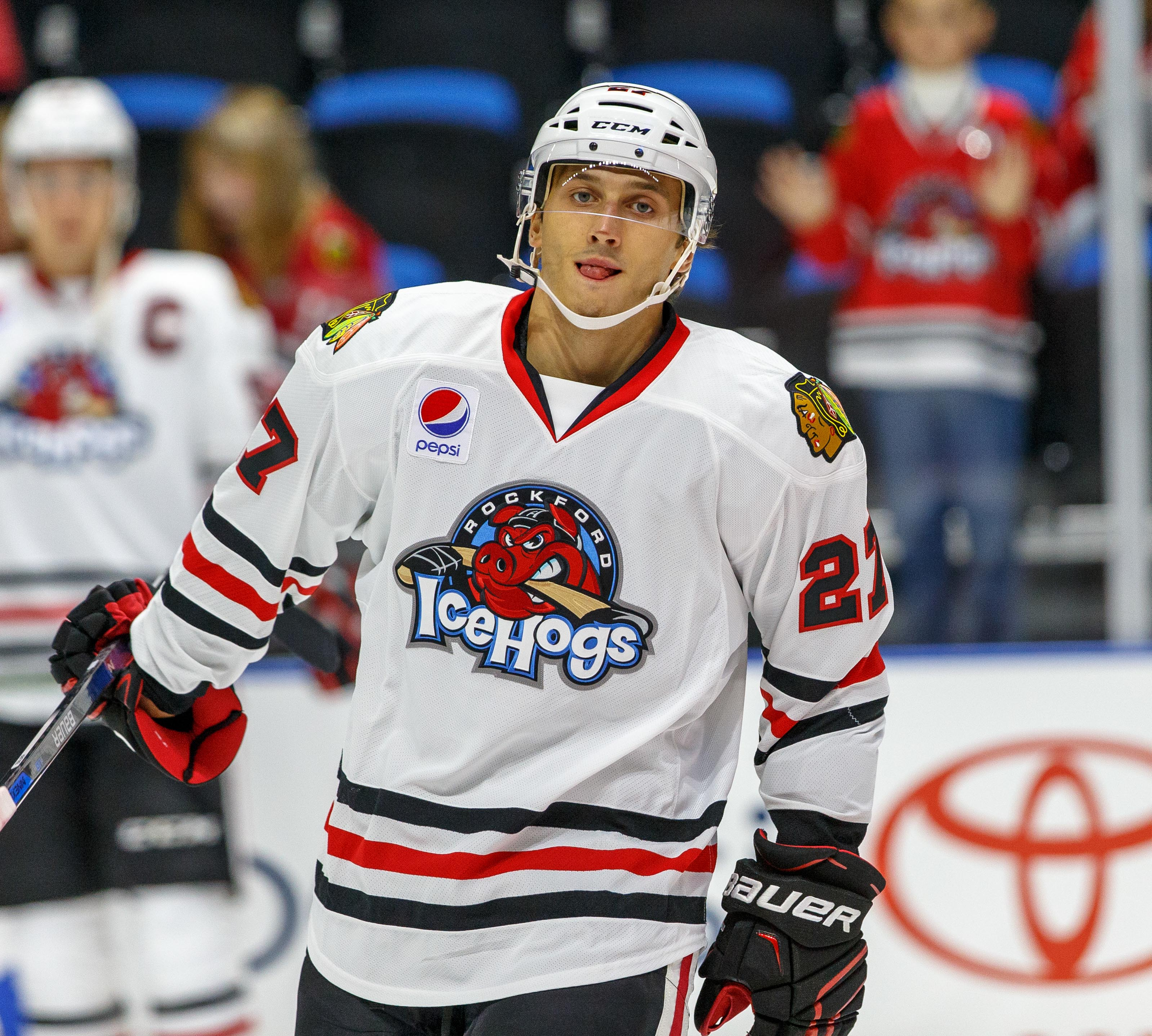
- Baun in 2015
- Born: May 4, 1992 (age 34) Toronto, Ontario, Canada
- Height: 6 ft 2 in (188 cm)
- Weight: 209 lb (95 kg; 14 st 13 lb)
- Position: Right wing
- Shot: Right
- Played for: Chicago Blackhawks; Rockford Icehogs; Laval Rocket; Toronto Marlies; Belfast Giants; Vienna Capitals
- NHL draft: Undrafted
- Playing career: 2015–2020

Kyle Baun (born May 4, 1992) is a Canadian former professional ice hockey forward who was last under contract to the Vienna Capitals of the Erste Bank Eishockey Liga (EBEL). Baun played in the National Hockey League (NHL) with the Chicago Blackhawks and is the grandson of former Toronto Maple Leafs player Bobby Baun.

== Playing career ==
After a Canadian minor junior league career with the Toronto Jr. Canadiens and the Cornwall Colts, Baun opted to pursue a collegiate career in committing with Colgate University of the ECAC conference.

Undrafted and upon completing his junior season in Colgate with 29 points in 38 games, earning an ECAC Third All-Star Team selection, Baun was signed to a two-year entry-level contract with the Chicago Blackhawks of the NHL on March 26, 2015. He immediately joined the Blackhawks for the remainder of the 2014–15 season, and later made his NHL debut in a 2-1 defeat to the Minnesota Wild on April 7, 2015.

During the 2015–16 season, on March 3, 2016, while with AHL affiliate, the Rockford IceHogs, Baun agreed to a two-year contract extension with the Blackhawks.

Approaching his third professional season in 2017–18, the Montreal Canadiens acquired Baun from the Blackhawks in exchange for forward Andreas Martinsen on October 4, 2017. Later in the season, on February 25, 2018, Baun was traded to the Toronto Maple Leafs, along with Tomáš Plekanec, in exchange for Kerby Rychel, Rinat Valiev and a second-round pick in the 2018 NHL entry draft.

As a free agent from the Maple Leafs, on August 1, 2018, Baun left North America and agreed to a deal with UK based, EIHL side the Belfast Giants.

After a season with the Vienna Capitals of the Austrian Hockey League (EBEL), Baun retired from hockey.

== Career statistics ==
			Regular season					Playoffs
Season	Team	League	GP	G	A	Pts	PIM	GP	G	A	Pts	PIM
2008–09	Toronto Jr. Canadiens	OJHL	2	0	1	1	0	—	—	—	—	—
2009–10	Toronto Jr. Canadiens	OJHL	45	5	10	15	27	7	0	0	0	6
2010–11	Cornwall Colts	CCHL	56	19	23	42	44	16	7	1	8	26
2011–12	Cornwall Colts	CCHL	42	29	32	61	50	17	8	12	20	16
2012–13	Colgate University	ECAC	36	14	10	24	30	—	—	—	—	—
2013–14	Colgate University	ECAC	39	11	15	26	53	—	—	—	—	—
2014–15	Colgate University	ECAC	38	14	15	29	68	—	—	—	—	—
2014–15	Chicago Blackhawks	NHL	3	0	0	0	0	—	—	—	—	—
2015–16	Chicago Blackhawks	NHL	2	0	0	0	0	—	—	—	—	—
2015–16	Rockford IceHogs	AHL	43	1	8	9	16	3	0	0	0	0
2016–17	Rockford IceHogs	AHL	74	14	20	34	42	—	—	—	—	—
2017–18	Laval Rocket	AHL	54	4	12	16	24	—	—	—	—	—
2017–18	Toronto Marlies	AHL	17	1	5	6	8	—	—	—	—	—
2018–19	Belfast Giants	EIHL	60	28	43	71	30	4	0	4	4	2
2019–20	Vienna Capitals	EBEL	48	15	18	33	14	3	1	0	1	0
NHL totals			5	0	0	0	0	—	—	—	—	—

== Awards and honours ==
Award	Year
College
ECAC All-Academic Team	2013, 2014
ECAC All-Rookie Team	2013
All-ECAC Third Team	2015
