= 2024–25 CCHL season =

64th season of the CCHL

- League: Central Canada Hockey League
- Sport: Ice hockey
- Duration: Regular season 19 September – 17 March; Playoffs; 19 March – 27 April
- Games: 330
- Teams: 12
- Total attendance: 96,945
- Streaming partner: FloSports
- Season MVP: Jayson Alegria
- Top scorer: Sebbie Johnson

League championship
- Champions: Rockland Nationals
- Runners-up: Carleton Place Canadians

CCHL seasons
- ← 2023–24 2025–26 →

The 2024–25 CCHL season is the 64th season of the Central Canada Hockey League (CCHL). The regular season started on 19 September 2024, when the Cornwall Colts and the Hawkesbury Hawks played their first game in Cornwall, Ontario at the Cornwall Civic Complex. The Bogart Cup playoffs began in March 2025, ending with the Bogart Cup Finals in May.

In November 2024, the CCHL and Ontario Junior Hockey League staged a two-day, four-team tournament, marketed as the "Battle of Ontario". Each league was represented by an all-star team and a prospect team. The tournament took place at the Smiths Falls Memorial Centre in Smiths Falls.

League chair, Steve Barban, died suddenly in October. Barban was also the owner and president of the Navan Grads and served on the Canadian Junior Hockey League Board of Governors.

== Regular season ==
The regular season started on September 19, 2024 and ran until March 17, 2024. Each team played 55 games, playing against each opponent five times. The annual showcase event, during which each team played two regular season games, was held during opening weekend at the Benson Centre in Cornwall. While teams were nominally assigned to either the East or West Division, the top 8 teams overall advanced to the playoffs regardless of their division assignment.

Standings
Rank	Team	GP	W	L	OTL	GF	GA	Pts
1	Rockland Nationals	55	45	8	2	250	138	92
2	Carleton Place Canadians	55	36	15	4	203	149	76
3	Navan Grads	55	32	16	7	230	186	71
4	Smiths Falls Bears	55	30	19	6	168	142	66
5	Pembroke Lumber Kings	55	28	24	3	194	177	59
6	Brockville Braves	55	27	24	4	181	195	58
7	Kemptville 73's	55	26	23	6	152	168	58
8	Cornwall Colts	55	26	24	5	156	196	57
9	Hawkesbury Hawks	55	24	24	7	195	204	55
10	Ottawa Jr. Senators	55	26	28	1	169	186	53
11	Nepean Raiders	55	16	33	6	183	239	38
12	Renfrew Wolves	55	14	35	6	135	236	34

Source: "2024–25 CCHL standings". hockeydb.com.

== Post-season ==
2025 League championship
Bogart Cup

Tournament details
- Dates: 19 March – 27 April
- Teams: 8
- Defending champions: Navan Grads

Final positions
- Champions: Rockland Nationals
- Runners-up: Carleton Place Canadians
- Semifinalists: Smiths Falls Bears; Navan Grads

Tournament statistics
- Games played: 39
- Goals scored: 254 (6.51 per game)
- Attendance: 22,530 (578 per game)

Awards
- Playoff MVP: Josh O'Connor

Official website
- 2025 CCHL playoffs

The top 8 teams overall at the end of the regular season advanced to the playoffs. The first seed Rockland Nationals swept the Cornwall Colts 4-0 in the first round, and beat the Smiths Falls Bears 4-3 to advance to the final. The Carleton Place Canadians also advanced to the final after they swept the Kemptville 73's 4-0 in the first round, and beat the 2024 championship Navan Grads 4-3 in the semifinal.

Quarterfinals
Rockland	4
Cornwall	0
Smiths Falls	4
Pembroke	2
Carleton Place	4
Kemptville	0
Navan	4
Brockville	3

Semifinals
Rockland	4
Smiths Falls	3
Carleton Place	4
Navan	3

Finals
Rockland	4
Carleton Place	0

Source: "2024–25 CCHL playoff results". hockeydb.com.

=== Quarterfinal: Rockland Nationals v. Cornwall Colts ===
The first-place Rockland Nationals swept the eighth-place Cornwall Colts 4-0.

21 March	Cornwall Colts	3-4	Rockland Nationals	Rockland Arena	Recap
No scoring		First period	1 - 09:21
power play 06:01 - 1 power play 06:48 - 2 power play 13:27 - 3		Second period	No scoring
No scoring		Third period	2 - 10:35; 3 - 15:10; 4 - 18:21

23 March	Rockland Nationals	3-2	OT	Cornwall Colts	Ed Lumley Arena	Recap
1 - 06:20		First period		07:20 - 1; 12:44 - 2
2 - 19:06		Second period		No scoring
No scoring		Third period		No scoring
3 - 13:14		First overtime period		No scoring

25 March	Cornwall Colts	5-6	Rockland Nationals	Rockland Arena	Recap
08:35 - 1		First period	1 - 13:35; 2 - 16:12
power play 07:38 - 2; 08:09 - 3		Second period	3 - 01:24; 4 - 05:06 power play 5 - 16:46
00:34 - 4		Third period	6 - 19:23 empty net

27 March	Rockland Nationals	4-2	Cornwall Colts	Ed Lumley Arena	Recap
04:31 - 1		First period	1 - 03:58
04:43 - 2		Second period	2 - 04:43
04:59 - 3; 09:57 - 4; 19:58 - 5		Third period	No scoring

Rockland Nationals win 4-0

=== Quarterfinal: Smiths Falls Bears v. Pembroke Lumber Kings ===
The fourth-place Smiths Falls Bears defeated the fifth-place Pembroke Lumber Kings 4-2.

21 March	Pembroke Lumber Kings	6-2	Smiths Falls Bears	Smiths Falls Memorial Centre	Recap
No scoring		First period	No scoring
02:09 - 1; 09:01 - 2 power play 09:50 - 3		Second period	1 - 06:51 power play
00:31 - 4 empty net 18:07 - 5; 19:35 - 6		Third period	2 - 09:31

23 March	Smiths Falls Bears	3-2	OT	Pembroke Lumber Kings	Pembroke Memorial Centre	Recap
No scoring		First period		1 - 01:16
01:25 - 1		Second period		2 - 19:18 power play
power play 00:42 - 2		Third period		No scoring
01:09 - 3		First overtime period		No scoring

25 March	Pembroke Lumber Kings	0-4	Smiths Falls Bears	Smiths Falls Memorial Centre	Recap
No scoring		First period	1 - 06:44
No scoring		Second period	2 - 02:50 power play 3 - 15:06
No scoring		Third period	4 - 12:20 power play

26 March	Smiths Falls Bears	2-4	Pembroke Lumber Kings	Pembroke Memorial Centre	Recap
No scoring		First period	1 - 07:46 shorthanded 2 - 11:43
04:28 - 1		Second period	3 - 09:56 power play
10:51 - 2		Third period	4 - 19:28 empty net

28 March	Pembroke Lumber Kings	3-4	Smiths Falls Bears	Smiths Falls Memorial Centre	Recap
power play 19:35 - 1		First period	1 - 16:05 power play
power play 00:49 - 2		Second period	2 - 01:50; 3 - 05:12
15:38 - 3		Third period	4 - 16:28

30 March	Smiths Falls Bears	4-3	OT	Pembroke Lumber Kings	Pembroke Memorial Centre	Recap
power play 11:00 - 1		First period		1 - 06:37; 2 - 19:13
No scoring		Second period		3 - 18:06
13:32 - 2; 17:52 - 3		Third period		No scoring
08:14 - 4		First overtime period		No scoring

Smiths Falls Bears win 4-2

=== Quarterfinal: Carleton Place Canadians v. Kemptville 73's ===
The second-place Carleton Place Canadians swept the seventh-place Kemptville 73's 4-0.

20 March	Kemptville 73's	1-3	Carleton Place Canadians	Carleton Place Arena	Recap
No scoring		First period	1 - 05:41; 2 - 15:51
06:02 - 1		Second period	No scoring
No scoring		Third period	3 - 18:54 empty net

21 March	Carleton Place Canadians	4-3	Kemptville 73's	North Grenville Municipal Centre	Recap
17:46 - 1; 18:15 - 2		First period	1 - 06:09
No scoring		Second period	2 - 05:43 power play 3 - 08:37 power play
09:42 - 3; 19:07 - 4		Third period	No scoring

23 March	Kemptville 73's	2-5	Carleton Place Canadians	Carleton Place Arena	Recap
power play 07:02 - 1; 09:11 - 2		First period	1 - 08:14
No scoring		Second period	2 - 03:10
No scoring		Third period	3 - 05:10; 4 - 12:06; 5 - 16:03

25 March	Carleton Place Canadians	4-3	Kemptville 73's	North Grenville Municipal Centre	Recap
power play 02:01 - 1; 09:08 - 2; 10:05 - 3		First period	1 - 14:16 power play
10:00 - 4		Second period	2 - 11:43 power play
No scoring		Third period	3 - 13:16

Carleton Place Canadians win 4-0

=== Quarterfinal: Navan Grads v. Brockville Braves ===
19 March	Brockville Braves	2-6	Navan Grads	Navan Memorial Centre	Recap
No scoring		First period	1 - 01:58
05:25 - 1; 13:23 - 2		Second period	2 - 03:00; 3 - 09:01; 4 - 16:35 power play 5 - 17:01
		Third period	6 - 18:41

21 March	Navan Grads	3-4	OT	Brockville Braves	Brockville Memorial Centre	Recap
No scoring		First period		No scoring
00:19 - 1; 08:53 - 2		Second period		1 - 07:50
power play 19:28 - 3		Third period		2 - 03:00; 3 - 07:35
No scoring		First overtime period		4 - 08:28

23 March	Brockville Braves	3-4	Navan Grads	Navan Memorial Centre	Recap
No scoring		First period	1 - 07:50; 2 - 12:09
14:10 - 1; 17:07 - 2; 18:03 - 3		Second period	No scoring
No scoring		Third period	3 - 01:34; 4 - 03:46

26 March	Navan Grads	4-5	OT	Brockville Braves	Brockville Memorial Centre	Recap
shorthanded 16:15 - 1 power play 17:20 - 2		First period		1 - 11:17
01:53 - 3		Second period		2 - 00:32; 3 - 08:02; 4 - 13:15
11:49 - 4		Third period		No scoring
No scoring		First overtime period		5 - 06:13

28 March	Brockville Braves	9-7	Navan Grads	Navan Memorial Centre	Recap
01:02 - 1; 07:15 - 2; 12:02 - 3 power play 15:59 - 4 power play17:54 - 5		First period	1 - 01:58; 2 - 08:48 power play
05:02 - 6; 10:36 - 7		Second period	3 - 00:27 power play 4 - 12:33 shorthanded 5 - 13:24 shorthanded
00:31 - 8 empty net, power play 19:01 - 9		Third period	6 - 03:11; 7 - 17:30

30 March	Navan Grads	3-0	Brockville Braves	Brockville Memorial Centre	Recap
09:25 - 1		First period	No scoring
12:12 - 2		Second period	No scoring
empty net 19:20 - 3		Third period	No scoring

1 April	Brockville Braves	2-5	Navan Grads	Navan Memorial Centre	Recap
No scoring		First period	1 - 09:00 power play 2 - 19:57
09:12 - 1		Second period	3 - 13:41
shorthanded 19:18 - 2		Third period	4 - 12:52; 5 - 18:27 empty net, shorthanded

Navan Grads win 4-3

=== Semifinal: Rockland Nationals v. Smiths Falls Bears ===
4 April	Smiths Falls Bears	0-6	Rockland Nationals	Rockland Arena	Recap
No scoring		First period	1 - 17:57
No scoring		Second period	2 - 10:24; 3 - 12:53; 4 - 13:14; 5 - 14:25
No scoring		Third period	6 - 08:40 power play

6 April	Rockland Nationals	3-1	Smiths Falls Bears	Smiths Falls Memorial Centre	Recap
07:07 - 1; 10:29 - 2		First period	1 - 19:22 power play
No scoring		Second period	No scoring
power play 00:31 - 3		Third period	No scoring

8 April	Smiths Falls Bears	5-1	Rockland Nationals	Rockland Arena	Recap
03:41 - 1; 11:41 - 2		First period	No scoring
No scoring		Second period	1 - 13:19
power play 07:02 - 3 empty net 17:14 - 4 empty net 13:14 - 5		Third period	No scoring

9 April	Rockland Nationals	2-5	Smiths Falls Bears	Smiths Falls Memorial Centre	Recap
No scoring		First period	1 - 03:11 power play 2 - 15:12 power play 3 - 15:30 power play
05:00 - 1		Second period	No scoring
07:45 - 2		Third period	4 - 01:09; 5 - 17:57 empty net

11 April	Smiths Falls Bears	2-6	Rockland Nationals	Rockland Arena	Recap
16:45 - 1		First period	1 - 12:00
No scoring		Second period	2 - 02:59; 3 - 05:11; 4 - 08:14
11:24 - 2		Third period	5 - 17:16 empty net 6 - 17:57

13 April	Rockland Nationals	3-4	OT	Smiths Falls Bears	Smiths Falls Memorial Centre	Recap
No scoring		First period		1 - 5:00
04:35 - 1; 14:54 - 2		Second period		2 - 16:09; 3 - 18:54 power play
18:03 - 3		Third period		No scoring
No scoring		First overtime period		4 - 11:04

16 April	Smiths Falls Bears	1-3	Rockland Nationals	Rockland Arena	Recap
power play 13:31 - 1		First period	No scoring
No scoring		Second period	1 - 10:59
No scoring		Third period	2 - 16:32 power play 3 - 19:30 empty net

Rockland Nationals win 4-3

=== Semifinal: Carleton Place Canadians v. Navan Grads ===
The second-place Carleton Place Canadians defeated third-place Navan Grads 4-3.

3 April	Navan Grads	0-3	Carleton Place Canadians	Carleton Place Arena	Recap
No scoring		First period	No scoring
No scoring		Second period	1 - 02:46
No scoring		Third period	2 - 03:37; 3 - 14:06

4 April	Carleton Place Canadians	2-3	2OT	Navan Grads	Navan Memorial Centre	Recap
No scoring		First period		1 - 01:37
03:51 - 1; 19:52 - 2		Second period		No scoring
No scoring		Third period		2 - 13:41
No scoring		Second overtime period		3 - 00:30 power play

6 April	Navan Grads	5-1	Carleton Place Canadians	Carleton Place Arena	Recap
power play 14:26 - 1		First period	No scoring
power play 00:29 - 2; 13:04 - 3		Second period	1 - 14:20
power play 04:41 - 4 empty net 16:16 - 5		Third period	No scoring

9 April	Carleton Place Canadians	2-3	OT	Navan Grads	Navan Memorial Centre	Recap
No scoring		First period		No scoring
02:13 - 1		Second period		1 - 01:22; 2 - 19:59
power play 10:31 - 2		Third period		No scoring
No scoring		First overtime period		3 - 05:53

11 April	Navan Grads	2-4	Carleton Place Canadians	Carleton Place Arena	Recap
11:26 - 1		First period	1 - 07:04 power play 2 - 19:06
02:48 - 2		Second period	3 - 17:26
		Third period	4 - 18:11 empty net

13 April	Carleton Place Canadians	5-4	Navan Grads	Navan Memorial Centre	Recap
00:57 - 1; 01:55 - 2; 15:06 - 3		First period	1 - 02:06
01:04 - 4 power play 16:01 - 5		Second period	2 - 18:32 power play
No scoring		Third period	3 - 07:55 power play 4 - 18:31

16 April	Navan Grads	2-4	Carleton Place Canadians	Carleton Place Arena	Recap
power play 08:40 - 1; 11:50 - 2		First period	1 - 01:50 power play 2 - 11:33; 3 - 18:04
No scoring		Second period	No scoring
No scoring		Third period	4 - 18:09 empty net

Carleton Place Canadians win 4-3

=== Final: Rockland Nationals v. Carleton Place Canadians ===
The first-place Rockland Nationals swept the second-place Carleton Place Canadians 4-0 to secure the league championship Bogart Cup.

21 April	Carleton Place Canadians	1-3	Rockland Nationals	Rockland Arena	Recap
09:23 - 1		First period	No scoring
No scoring		Second period	1 - 13:51 power play
No scoring		Third period	2 - 04:47; 3 - 18:05 empty net

23 April	Rockland Nationals	3-2	Carleton Place Canadians	Carleton Place Arena	Recap
14:58 - 1; 19:58 - 2		First period	1 - 00:48
No scoring		Second period	No scoring
16:05 - 3		Third period	2 - 18:17

25 April	Carleton Place Canadians	2-4	Rockland Nationals	Rockland Arena	Recap
17:21 - 1		First period	No scoring
No scoring		Second period	1 - 02:02
15:35 - 2		Third period	2 - 10:52; 3 - 14:35 power play 4 - 18:15 empty net

27 April	Rockland Nationals	5-4	OT	Carleton Place Canadians	Carleton Place Arena	Recap
19:07 - 1		First period		No scoring
02:16 - 2; 13:31 - 3; 15:03 - 4		Second period		1 - 03:25; 2 - 17:56
No scoring		Third period		3 - 13:53; 4 - 16:48
02:57 - 5		First overtime period		No scoring

Rockland Nationals win 4-0

== National championship ==
2025 National championship
Centennial Cup
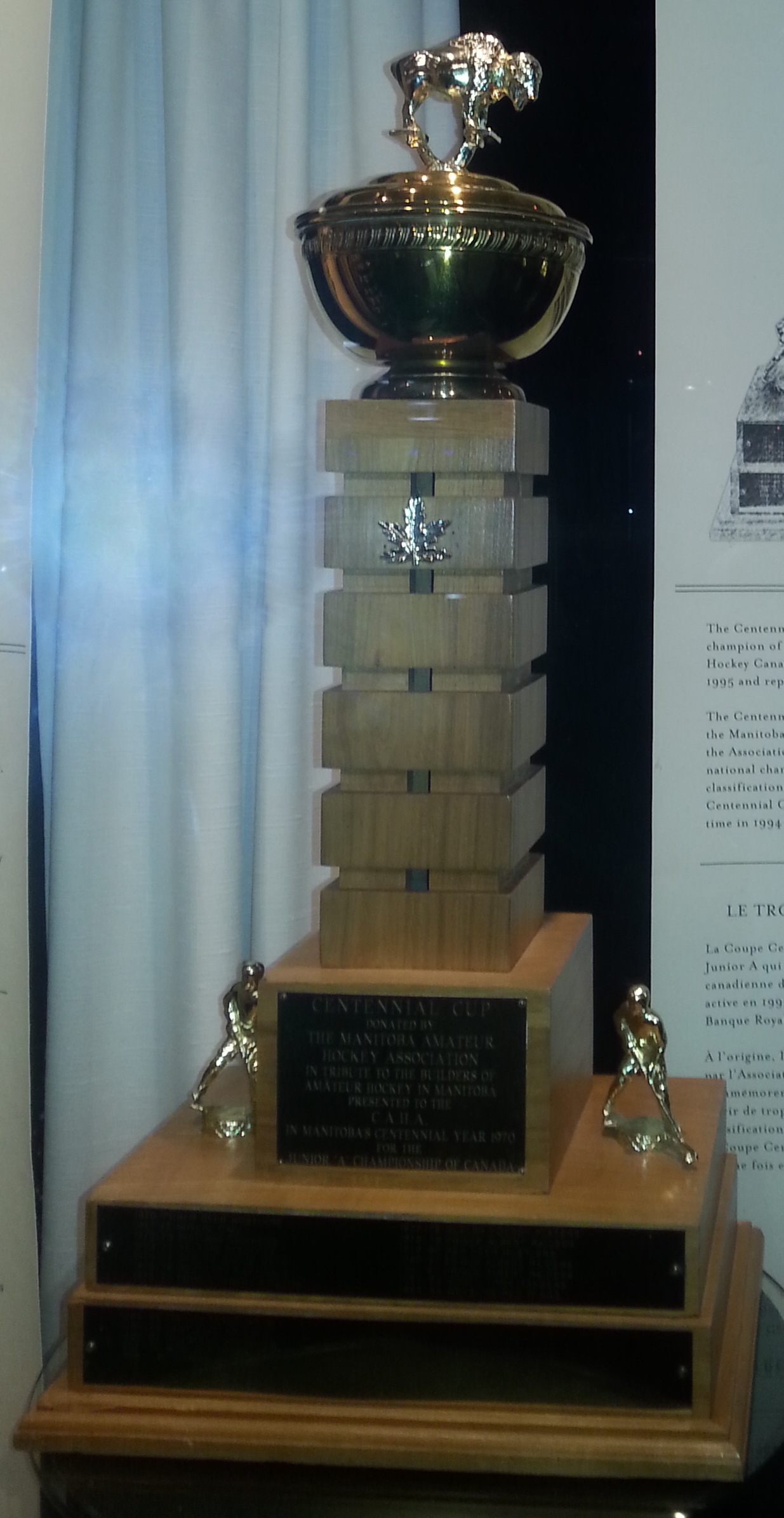

Tournament details
- Cities: Calgary, Alberta
- Venue: Max Bell Centre
- Dates: 8–18 May 2025
- Teams: 10
- Host team: Calgary Canucks

Final positions
- Champions: Calgary Canucks
- Runners-up: Melfort Mustangs
- Semifinalists: Rockland Nationals; Trenton Golden Hawks

Tournament statistics
- Games played: 25
- Goals scored: 189 (7.56 per game)

Awards
- MVP: Anthony Hall

Official website
- Hockey Canada

The 54th annual Junior A national championship tournament will be hosted by the Calgary Canucks of the Alberta Junior Hockey League (AJHL) at the Max Bell Centre in Calgary, and will bring together the championship teams from the 9 leagues that collectively make up the Canadian Junior Hockey League (CJHL). The CCHL was represented by the championship Rockland Nationals. The Nationals were eliminated from competition after losing to the Calgary Canucks in the semifinal. Nationals' forward, Anthony Hall, was named the Most Valuable Player of the tournament.

=== Round robin ===
Teams were randomly assigned to Group A or Group B. During the preliminary round robin phase, each team played each other team in their group once. Three points were awarded for a win in regulation time, two points for a win in overtime or shootout, one point for a loss in overtime or shootout, and no points were awarded for a loss in regulation time.

	Group A	TGH	NMB	GSC	GPS	KRF
1	Trenton Golden Hawks		5-4	5-2	6-2	1-2
2	Northern Manitoba Blizzard	4-5		6-3	6-3	3-2
3	Greater Sudbury Cubs	2-5	3-6		6-2	2-1
4	Grande Prairie Storm	2-6	3-6	2-6		3-1
5	Kam River Fighting Walleye	2-1	2-3	1-2	1-3	

	Group B	CC	MM	RN	EB	VB
1	Calgary Canucks		3-1	2-7	8-2	11-6
2	Melfort Mustangs	1-3		5-2	5-3	5-4
3	Rockland Nationals	7-2	2-5		3-4	9-4
4	Edmunston Blizzard	2-8	3-5	4-3		7-2
5	Valleyfield Braves	6-11	4-5	4-9	2-7	

=== Playoffs ===
Based on the results of the preliminary round robin, the quarterfinals included the Northern Manitoba Blizzard against the Rockland Nationals; and the Melfort Mustangs against the Greater Sudbury Cubs. The Nationals defeated the Blizzard, 4-0, and the Mustangs defeated the Cubs, 7-1.

The Trenton Golden Hawks and the Calgary Canucks, who placed first in their respective groups, had a bye in the quarterfinal round and advanced to the semifinals. The Canucks faced the Nationals, and the Golden Hawks faced the Mustangs. The Canucks had previously lost to the Nationals by a score of 7-2 in the preliminary round. By the 2nd period of the semifinal, the Nationals were winning, 2-0, and by the end of 3rd period, the score was tied, 2-2. The Canucks scored the game-winning goal in overtime to advance to the final.

The final was between the Canucks and the Mustangs. Notably, it was the Mustangs who eliminated the Canucks at the 2024 Centennial Cup in the semifinal, before losing in the final. This time, however, the Canucks defeated the Mustangs, 7-2, to win the championship Centennial Cup.

Quarterfinals
Northern Manitoba Blizzard	0
Rockland Nationals	4
Melfort Mustangs	7
Greater Sudbury Cubs	1

Semifinals
Rockland Nationals	2
Calgary Canucks	3
Trenton Golden Hawks	3
Melfort Mustangs	4

Finals
Calgary Canucks	7
Melfort Mustangs	2

Source: "2025 Centennial Cup schedule & results". hockeycanada.ca. Hockey Canada.

== Individual awards ==
Scoring champion
Sebbie Johnson
Navan Grads
Regular season MVP
Jayson Alegria
Pembroke Lumber Kings
Playoff MVP
Josh O’Connor
Rockland Nationals
Best defenseman
Easton Penna
Pembroke Lumber Kings
Best goaltender
Ian Vandenberg
Carleton Place Canadians
Rookie of the year
Finn Barton
Carleton Place Canadians
Sportsmanship award
Eric Barnard
Pembroke Lumber Kings
Best graduating player
Sebbie Johnson
Navan Grads
Best prospect
Shaan Kingwell
Navan Grads
General Manager of the year
Carl Robillard
Rockland Nationals
Coach of the year
Justin Pereira
Rockland Nationals
Trainer of the year
Denis Dalrymple
Rockland Nationals
Sam Pollock award
Steve Barban
League Chairman
Pat Smith award
Dale McCabe
Smiths Falls Bears
Chris Messina broadcasting award
Rowan McCarthy received the Chris Messina broadcasting award. The award is presented annually to a broadcaster who exemplifies the professionalism and dedication.
Arthur K. Nielsen scholarship
The top academic player award went to Nick Houben of the Nepean Raiders. This scholarship is awarded to a player who combines hockey excellence, academic success and volunteering.
Mark Yakabuski scholarship
Tristan Boudreau of the Carleton Place Canadians received the Mark Yakabuski scholarship. The scholarship was established in 2023 and is awarded to the league's top graduating high school graduating player.

S̅o̅u̅r̅c̅e̅: "C̅C̅H̅L̅ s̅e̅a̅s̅o̅n̅ a̅w̅a̅r̅d̅ a̅r̅c̅h̅i̅v̅e̅s̅". t̅h̅e̅c̅c̅h̅l̅.c̅a̅.
