= 2007–08 CJHL season =

- League: Central Junior A Hockey League
- Sport: Hockey
- Duration: Regular season 2007-09-14 – 2008-03-07; Playoffs; 2008-03-09 – 2008-04-13
- Teams: 11
- Finals champions: Pembroke Lumber Kings

CJHL seasons
- 2006–07 2008–09

The 2007–08 CJHL season was the 47th season of the Central Junior A Hockey League (CJHL). The eleven teams of the CJHL played 60-game schedules.

In March 2008, the top teams of the league played down for the Bogart Cup, the CJHL championship. The winner of the Bogart Cup competed in the Eastern Canadian Junior "A" championship, the Fred Page Cup. If successful against the winners of the Quebec Junior AAA Hockey League and Maritime Hockey League, the champion would then move on to play in the Canadian Junior Hockey League championship, the 2008 Royal Bank Cup.

== Changes ==
- Kemptville 73's join league from Eastern Ontario Junior B Hockey League.

== Final standings ==
Note: GP = Games played; W = Wins; L = Losses; OTL = Overtime losses; SL = Shootout losses; GF = Goals for; GA = Goals against; PTS = Points; x = clinched playoff berth; y = clinched division title; z = clinched conference title

Robinson Division
Team	Centre	W-L-T-OTL	GF	GA	Points
x-Cumberland Grads	Navan	34-19-3-3	221	182	74
x-Cornwall Colts	Cornwall	31-24-1-4	211	207	67
x-Hawkesbury Hawks	Hawkesbury	30-27-3-0	232	214	63
y-Orleans Blues	Gloucester	14-38-5-3	188	301	36
y-Ottawa Jr. Senators	Ottawa	12-43-2-3	148	298	29
Yzerman Division
Team	Centre	W-L-T-OTL	GF	GA	Points
x-Pembroke Lumber Kings	Pembroke	46-11-2-1	281	138	95
x-Smiths Falls Bears	Smiths Falls	41-15-4-0	280	183	86
x-Brockville Braves	Brockville	38-18-3-1	270	196	80
x-Nepean Raiders	Nepean	32-23-3-2	233	203	69
x-Kanata Stallions	Kanata	22-32-3-3	185	231	50
y-Kemptville 73's	Kemptville	15-39-2-4	164	260	36

(x-) denotes berth into playoffs, (y-) denotes elimination from playoffs, (z-) clinched division.

Teams listed on the official league website.

Standings listed on official league website.

== 2007-08 Bogart Cup Playoffs ==
Quarter-finals
1	Pembroke	4
8	Kanata	0
4	Brockville	4
5	Nepean	2
2	Cumberland	2
7	Hawkesbury	4
3	Smiths Falls	4
6	Cornwall	1

Semi-finals
1	Pembroke	4
7	Hawkesbury	1
3	Smiths Falls	4
4	Brockville	1

Bogart Cup Finals
1	Pembroke	4
3	Smiths Falls	1

Playoff results are listed on the official league website.

== Fred Page Cup Championship ==
Hosted by the Weeks Crushers in New Glasgow, Nova Scotia. Pembroke finished first in the round robin but lost the final.

Round Robin

Pembroke Lumber Kings 7 - Weeks Crushers (MJAHL) 1
Pembroke Lumber Kings 3 - Yarmouth Mariners (MJAHL) 2 OT
Sherbrooke Cougars (QJAAAHL) 2 - Pembroke Lumber Kings 1

Final

Weeks Crushers (MJAHL) 4 - Pembroke Lumber Kings 1

== Scoring leaders ==
Note: GP = Games played; G = Goals; A = Assists; Pts = Points; PIM = Penalty minutes

Player	Team	GP	G	A	Pts	PIM
Nick Tremblay	Smiths Falls Bears	57	51	59	110	67
Matt Gordon	Smiths Falls Bears	58	40	68	108	71
Chris Bryson	Pembroke Lumber Kings	60	36	72	108	28
Brandon Richardson	Pembroke Lumber Kings	54	31	68	99	104
Stefan Lachapelle	Hawkesbury Hawks	59	41	53	94	60
Jacob Laliberte	Hawkesbury Hawks	59	43	48	91	16
Adam Brace	Pembroke Lumber Kings	50	37	53	90	63
Darcy Findlay	Cornwall Colts	60	44	38	82	75
Eric Selleck	Pembroke Lumber Kings	49	43	38	81	120
Jeffrey Clarke	Cumberland Grads	59	40	40	80	46

== Leading goaltenders ==
Note: GP = Games played; Mins = Minutes played; W = Wins; L = Losses: OTL = Overtime losses; SL = Shootout losses; GA = Goals Allowed; SO = Shutouts; GAA = Goals against average

Player	Team	GP	Mins	W	L	T	OTL	GA	SO	Sv%	GAA
Jody O'Neil	Smiths Falls Bears	44	2593:00	29	11	3	0	113	4	0.915	2.61
Adam Laderoute	Cumberland Grads	23	1224:46	13	2	2	2	53	1	0.912	2.60
Paul Beckwith	Pembroke Lumber Kings	44	2496:23	29	9	2	0	100	6	0.911	2.40
Matt Dopud	Kanata Stallions	52	2970:12	20	26	2	2	176	0	0.902	3.56
Darren MacDonald	Nepean Raiders	30	1697:21	16	10	1	1	90	1	0.902	3.18

== Awards ==
- Most Outstanding Player - Nick Tremblay (Smiths Falls Bears)
- Scoring Champion - Nick Tremblay (Smiths Falls Bears)
- Rookie of the Year - Calvin de Haan (Kemptville 73's)
- Top Goaltender - Paul Beckwith (Pembroke Lumber Kings)
- Top Defenceman - Mark Borowiecki (Smiths Falls Bears)
- Top Prospects Award - Jacob Laliberte (Hawkesbury Hawks)
- Most Sportsmanlike Player - Chris Bryson (Pembroke Lumber Kings)
- Top Graduating Player - Stefan Lachapelle (Hawkesbury Hawks)
- Scholastic Player of the Year - Patrick Millette (Pembroke Lumber Kings)
- Coach of the Year - Sheldon Keefe (Pembroke Lumber Kings)
- Manager of the Year - Bill Bowker (Smiths Falls Bears)

== Players taken in the 2008 NHL entry draft ==
- Rd 5 #139 Mark Borowiecki - Ottawa Senators (Smiths Falls Bears)
- Rd 6 #173 Nick Tremblay - Boston Bruins (Smiths Falls Bears)
- Rd 7 #209 Mike Bergin - Dallas Stars (Smiths Falls Bears)

== See also ==
- 2008 Royal Bank Cup
- Fred Page Cup
- Quebec Junior AAA Hockey League
- Maritime Hockey League
- 2007 in ice hockey
- 2008 in ice hockey

Preceded by 2006–07 CJHL season	CHL seasons	Succeeded by 2008–09 CJHL season
