= 2009–10 CJHL season =

- League: Central Junior Hockey League
- Sport: Hockey
- Duration: Regular season 2009-09-11 – 2010-03-07; Playoffs; 2010-03-09 – 2010-04-13
- Teams: 12
- Finals champions: Pembroke Lumber Kings

CJHL seasons
- 2008–09 2010–11

The 2009–10 CJHL season was the 49th season of the Central Junior Hockey League (CJHL). The twelve teams of the CJHL played 62-game schedules.

In March 2010, the top teams of the league played down for the Bogart Cup, the CJHL championship. The winner of the Bogart Cup competed in the Eastern Canadian Junior "A" championship, the Fred Page Cup. If successful against the winners of the Quebec Junior AAA Hockey League and Maritime Hockey League, the champion would then move on to play in the Canadian Junior Hockey League championship, the 2010 Royal Bank Cup.

== Changes ==
- League changes name from Central Junior A Hockey League to Central Junior Hockey League.
- Carleton Place Canadians join league from Eastern Ontario Junior B Hockey League.

== Standings ==
Note: GP = Games played; W = Wins; L = Losses; OTL = Overtime losses; SL = Shootout losses; GF = Goals for; GA = Goals against; PTS = Points; x = clinched playoff berth; y = clinched division title; z = clinched conference title

Robinson Division
Team	Centre	W–L–OTL–SOL	GF	GA	Points
x-Brockville Braves	Brockville	52-8-1-1	308	140	106
x-Cornwall Colts	Cornwall	41-16-1-4	242	171	87
x-Kemptville 73's	Kemptville	27-29-1-5	191	214	60
y-Carleton Place Canadians	Carleton Place	25-35-1-1	196	234	52
y-Smiths Falls Bears	Smiths Falls	18-40-1-3	148	256	40
y-Hawkesbury Hawks	Hawkesbury	12-48-1-1	137	338	26
Yzerman Division
Team	Centre	W–L–OTL–SOL	GF	GA	Points
x-Pembroke Lumber Kings	Pembroke	52-9-1-0	288	144	105
x-Gloucester Rangers	Gloucester	35-21-2-4	277	225	76
x-Ottawa Jr. Senators	Ottawa	33-24-0-5	216	204	71
x-Nepean Raiders	Nepean	33-26-2-1	250	217	69
x-Cumberland Grads	Navan	29-26-4-3	205	204	65
y-Kanata Stallions	Kanata	15-42-2-3	180	291	35

(x-) denotes berth into playoffs, (y-) denotes elimination from playoffs, (z-) clinched division.

Teams listed on the official league website.

Standings listed on official league website.

== 2009-10 Bogart Cup Playoffs ==
Quarter-finals
1	Brockville	4
8	Kemptville	0
4	Gloucester	2
5	Ottawa	4
2	Pembroke	4
7	Cumberland	1
3	Cornwall	4
6	Nepean	2

Semi-finals
1	Brockville	4
5	Ottawa	0
2	Pembroke	4
3	Cornwall	2

Bogart Cup Final
1	Brockville	1
2	Pembroke	4

Playoff results are listed on the official league website.

== Fred Page Cup Championship ==
Hosted by the Brockville Braves in Brockville, Ontario. Brockville won the tournament, while Pembroke finished second.

Round Robin

Pembroke Lumber Kings 6 - Terrebonne Cobras (QJAAAHL) 5 OT
Brockville Braves 6 - Woodstock Slammers (MJAHL) 0
Brockville Braves 2 - Pembroke Lumber Kings 1
Pembroke Lumber Kings 7 - Woodstock Slammers (MJAHL) 4
Brockville Braves 5 - Terrebonne Cobras (QJAAAHL) 2

Semi-final

Pembroke Lumber Kings 6 - Terrebonne Cobras (QJAAAHL) 4

Final

Brockville Braves 5 - Pembroke Lumber Kings 1

== 2010 Royal Bank Cup Championship ==
Hosted by the Dauphin Kings in Dauphin, Manitoba. Brockville finished 3rd in the round robin and was eliminated in the semi-final.

Round Robin

Brockville Braves 11 - Oakville Blades (OJAHL) 2
Dauphin Kings (MJHL) 3 - Brockville Braves 2
Vernon Vipers (BCHL) 4 - Brockville Braves 2
Brockville Braves 6 - La Ronge Ice Wolves (SJHL) 3

Semi-final

Vernon Vipers (BCHL) 2 - Brockville Braves 0

== Scoring leaders ==
Note: GP = Games played; G = Goals; A = Assists; Pts = Points; PIM = Penalty minutes

Player	Team	GP	G	A	Pts	PIM
Damian Cross	Pembroke Lumber Kings	62	53	87	140	32
Tyler Tosunian	Pembroke Lumber Kings	56	38	76	114	46
Jacob Laliberte	Cornwall Colts	50	62	48	110	34
Andrew Creppin	Gloucester Rangers	56	43	60	103	64
Allan McPherson	Kanata Stallions	56	40	63	103	16
Shayne Stockton	Brockville Braves	57	37	61	98	20
Andrew Calof	Nepean Raiders	57	45	52	97	42
Stephen Blunden	Gloucester Rangers	54	22	68	90	106
Shayne Thompson	Brockville Braves	57	33	54	87	76
Kyle Just	Pembroke Lumber Kings	55	33	54	87	48

== Leading goaltenders ==
Note: GP = Games played; Mins = Minutes played; W = Wins; L = Losses: OTL = Overtime losses; SL = Shootout losses; GA = Goals Allowed; SO = Shutouts; GAA = Goals against average

Player	Team	GP	Mins	W	L	OTL	SOL	GA	SO	Sv%	GAA
Scott Zacharias	Pembroke Lumber Kings	39	2280:23	33	3	1	0	87	7	0.926	2.29
Niels-Erik Ravn	Ottawa Jr. Senators	43	2540:14	26	14	0	3	116	5	0.920	2.74
Doug Carr	Cornwall Royals	38	2159:13	27	6	1	2	90	2	0.919	2.50
Clarke Saunders	Brockville Braves	39	2364:08	31	7	0	1	91	3	0.915	2.31
Ben Curley	Kemptville 73's	50	2979:24	25	19	0	6	148	2	0.910	2.98

== Awards ==
- Most Outstandings Player - Damian Cross (Pembroke Lumber Kings)
- Scoring Champion - Damian Cross (Pembroke Lumber Kings)
- Rookie of the Year - Matthew Peca (Pembroke Lumber Kings)
- Top Goaltender - Doug Carr (Cornwall Colts)
- Top Defenceman - Ben Reinhardt (Pembroke Lumber Kings)
- Top Prospects Award - Michael Borkowski (Cumberland Grads)
- Most Sportsmanlike Player - Allan McPherson (Kanata Stallions)
- Top Graduating Player - Shayne Thompson (Brockville Braves)
- Scholastic Player of the Year - Andrew Calof (Nepean Raiders)
- Coach of the Year - Todd Gill (Brockville Braves)
- Manager of the Year - Sheldon Keefe (Pembroke Lumber Kings)

== See also ==
- 2010 Royal Bank Cup
- Fred Page Cup
- Quebec Junior AAA Hockey League
- Maritime Hockey League
- 2009 in ice hockey
- 2010 in ice hockey

Preceded by 2008–09 CJHL season	CHL seasons	Succeeded by 2010–11 CHL (junior) season
