= Sheldon Keefe =

Canadian ice hockey coach and player (born 1980)

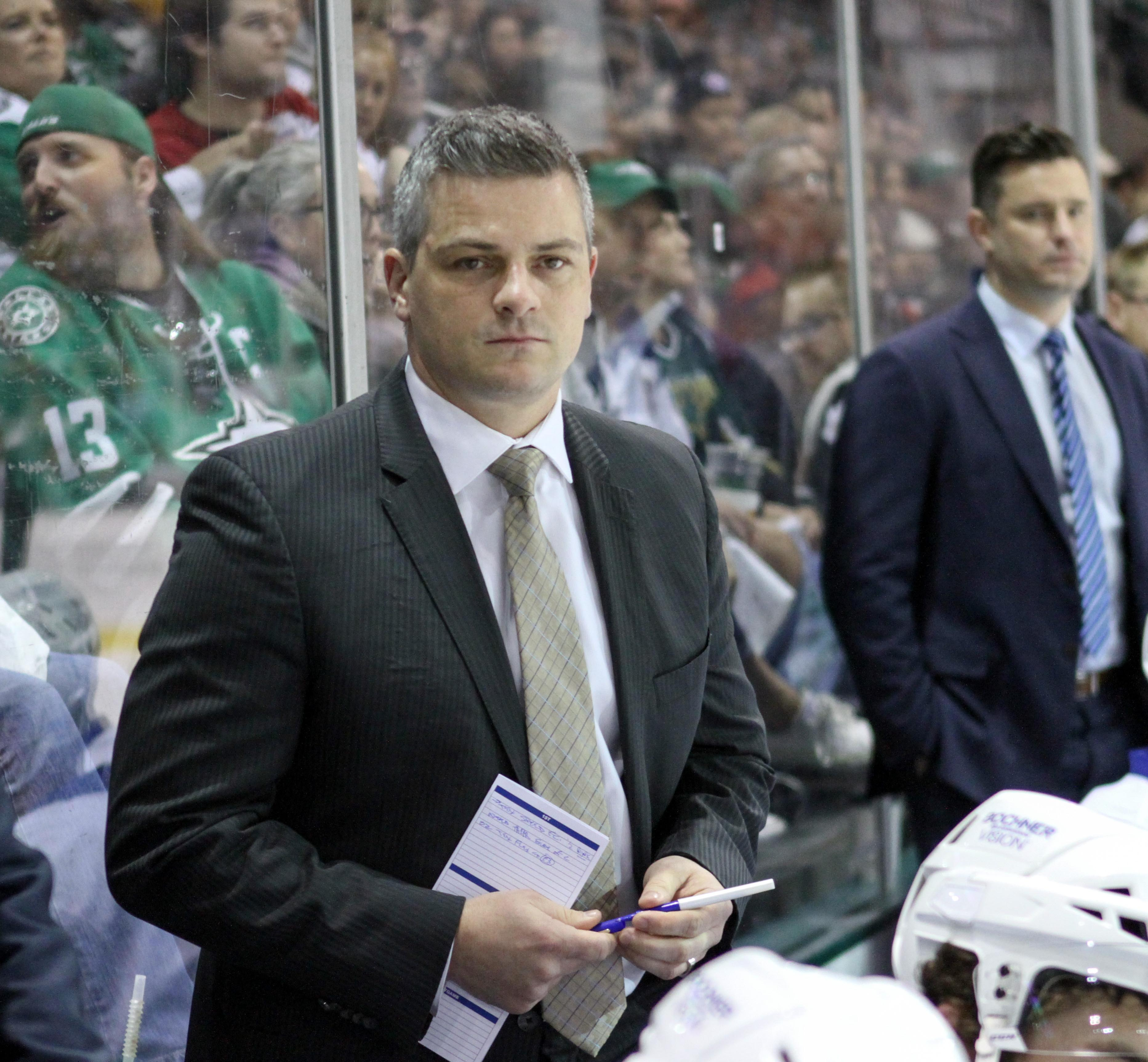
- Keefe in 2018
- Born: September 17, 1980 (age 46) Brampton, Ontario, Canada
- Height: 5 ft 10 in (178 cm)
- Weight: 185 lb (84 kg; 13 st 3 lb)
- Position: Right wing
- Shot: Right
- Played for: Tampa Bay Lightning
- Current NHL coach: New Jersey Devils
- Coached for: Toronto Maple Leafs
- NHL draft: 47th overall, 1999; Tampa Bay Lightning
- Playing career: 2000–2004
- Coaching career: 2006–present

Sheldon Keefe (born September 17, 1980) is a Canadian professional ice hockey coach and former player who is the head coach for the New Jersey Devils of the National Hockey League (NHL). He was selected in the second round, 47th overall, by the Tampa Bay Lightning in the 1999 NHL entry draft. He has also served as head coach of the Toronto Maple Leafs, as well as for their American Hockey League (AHL) affiliate, the Toronto Marlies, guiding the latter to their first Calder Cup championship in 2018.

== Playing career ==
As a youth, Keefe played in the 1994 Quebec International Pee-Wee Hockey Tournament with the Toronto Young Nationals minor ice hockey team.

In the 1998–99 season with the Toronto St. Michael's Majors and the Barrie Colts of the Ontario Hockey League, Keefe scored over 100 points, and was named the OHL Rookie of the Year, over Jason Spezza and Brad Boyes. Keefe was then selected 47th overall, in the 1999 NHL entry draft as the second choice of the Tampa Bay Lightning and subsequently signed a three-year contract with the team. In the 1999–2000 OHL season, Keefe led the OHL in scoring and set a Colts franchise record for most points in a season in the process, posting 121 points (48 goals, 73 assists) in 66 games. During that season's playoffs, Keefe led the Colts to a seven-game victory over the Plymouth Whalers to claim the only OHL championship in Colts history. Keefe and the Colts drew national attention for their on- and off-ice behaviour which called into question the character of the players. Upon winning the OHL championship, Keefe, as captain of the Colts, infamously refused to shake the hand of league commissioner David Branch, telling him, "this must burn your ass." At the Memorial Cup, the team walked out on a customary banquet, threatened members of the opposing Rimouski Oceanic, and refused to shake hands with Branch, also serving as Canadian Hockey League president, during pregame ceremonies. Their season ended with a 6–2 loss to the Oceanic in the Memorial Cup final.

Keefe made his NHL debut on October 18, 2000, in his first professional season in 2000–01. He was shortly demoted to their American Hockey League team but was suspended without pay for failing to show up. In the summer of 2004, Keefe was acquired by the Phoenix Coyotes. He did not play a game for the Coyotes, but in the 2004–05 season Keefe played 4 games for the Utah Grizzlies (1995-2005). In September 2005, Keefe was re-signed as a restricted free agent by the Phoenix Coyotes and reassigned to San Antonio (AHL).

After just five professional seasons, Keefe opted to end his professional career and continue his career in hockey with coaching.

== Coaching career ==
=== Pembroke Lumber Kings (2006–2012) ===
Keefe purchased the Pembroke Lumber Kings, a struggling Junior A franchise in the Central Canada Hockey League, in July 2003. After a knee injury effectively ended his career in the 2004–05 AHL season, Keefe began to assist Lumber Kings head coach and general manager Kevin Abrams. The Lumber Kings went 50–7–1–1 in the 2005–06 season and were ranked first overall in Canada before being upset in the second round of the playoffs by the Nepean Raiders. During the 2005–06 season, Keefe's then agent, David Frost, caused a wave of concern throughout the CJHL when he was found in an off limits area of an Ottawa arena. He was also filmed by CBC's The Fifth Estate which then ran a documentary showing Frost attending several Lumber Kings games, thus putting the league in a bad light considering the ongoing criminal investigation of a sexual nature against Frost at the time.

Keefe was named as head coach and general manager of the Lumber Kings on June 6, 2006, after Abrams was promoted to league commissioner. In 2006–07, his first year, he led the Lumber Kings to a 41–10–2–2 record and guided the team to its first league championship in 18 years. The Lumber Kings then defeated the St-Jérôme Panthers at the Fred Page Cup to claim the Eastern Canadian championship. At the national championship-deciding Royal Bank Cup, the Lumber Kings lost to the Aurora Tigers in overtime of the semi-final to end their season.

Over the next three seasons, the Lumber Kings continued to develop under Keefe, and culminated in three more championships for the Pembroke club.

As the 2010–11 CCHL season began, the Lumber Kings were seeking a fifth straight league championship under Keefe's reign. The Lumber Kings went 51–9–2–2 and entered the postseason ranked 7th in Canada. After going undefeated through the first two rounds, they met the Cornwall Colts in the CCHL final. A hard-fought series saw the Lumber Kings prevail in six games to claim a fifth straight league championship, becoming the first team in league history to do so. The team proceeded to emerge victorious at the Fred Page Cup in a victory over the Longueuil Collège Français and advanced to the Royal Bank Cup to compete for the national championship. After eliminating the Camrose Kodiaks in the semi-final, they met the Vernon Vipers to decide the Royal Bank Cup. The Vipers were seeking a third straight national title, and the Lumber Kings were looking for their first in the treasured history of the club. Keefe's squad battled to a 2–0 victory to become the 2011 Royal Bank Cup Champions.

Midway through the 2012–13 CCHL season, Keefe announced that he was leaving the Lumber Kings to become the head coach of the Ontario Hockey League's Sault Ste. Marie Greyhounds. He finished his CCHL coaching career with a record of 285–95–12, establishing team records for most career wins and highest career win percentage. Keefe announced over Twitter on May 29, 2013, that he had sold the Pembroke Lumber Kings to former Calgary Flames player, and Eganville native Dale McTavish. On October 4, 2013, Keefe returned to Pembroke as he was honoured with a banner raised to the rafters of the Pembroke Memorial Centre in recognition of his era with the team.

=== Sault Ste. Marie Greyhounds (2012–2015) ===
On December 3, 2012, Keefe was named the head coach of the Ontario Hockey League's Sault Ste. Marie Greyhounds. Keefe quickly turned around a faltering Greyhounds team and transformed them into a powerhouse. In 2013–2014, his first full season as head coach, the Greyhounds were 44–17–7 and finished atop the West Division. They were swept in the second round of the playoffs at the hands of future NHL 1st overall draft pick Connor McDavid and the Erie Otters.

In 2014–2015, the Greyhounds' revitalization was complete, and the team posted their greatest season in franchise history, topping the OHL with a 54–12–2 record thanks to a league-leading 342 goals scored. Keefe was awarded the Matt Leyden Trophy as the OHL's top coach and was named the CHL Coach of the Year. Keefe's Greyhounds showed their strength in the playoffs, sweeping both the first and second round to enter the Western Conference final undefeated. However, it was McDavid and the Otters once again ending the Greyhounds' run, as the Otters topped the Greyhounds in six games.

=== Toronto Marlies (2015–2019) ===
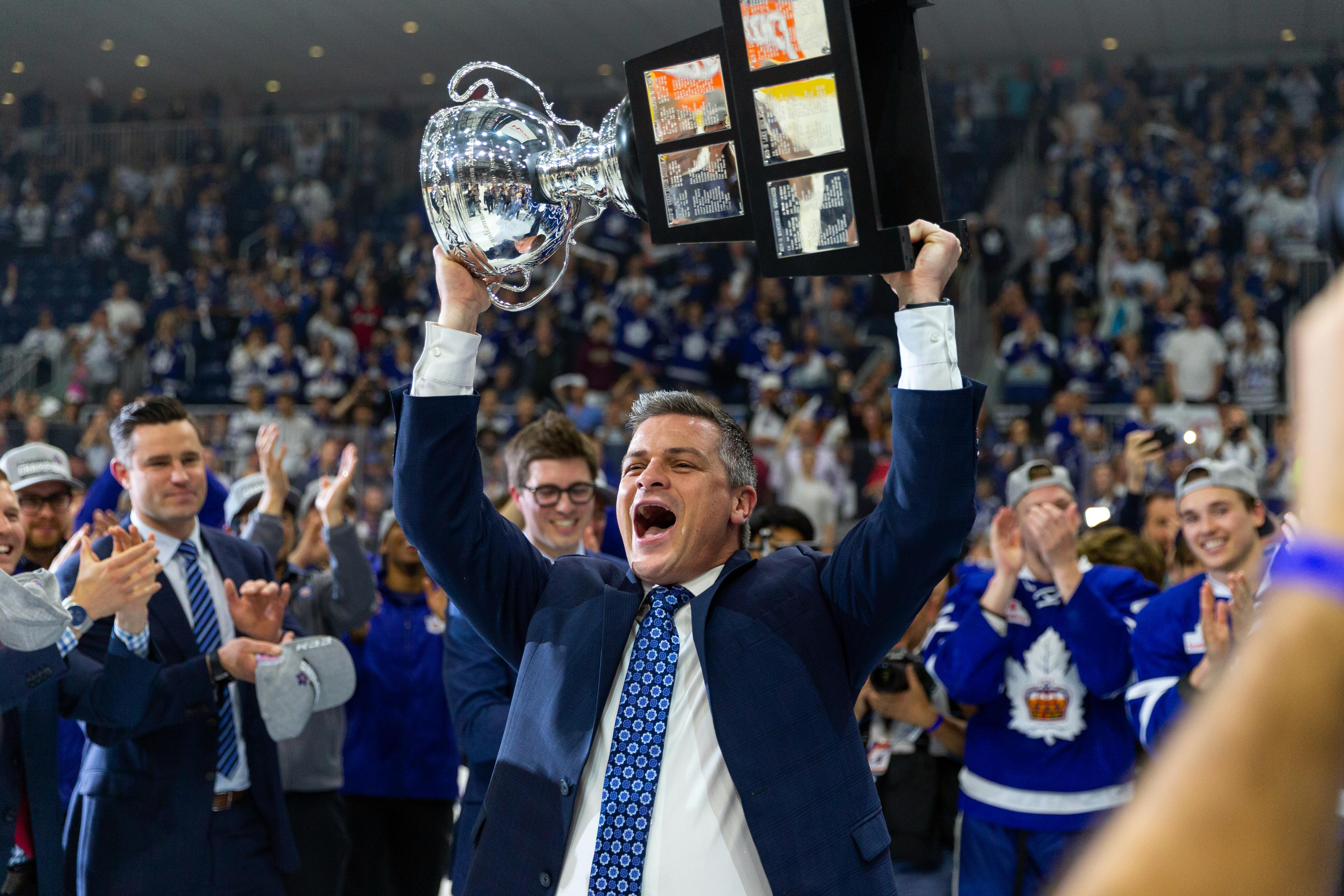
Keefe with the Calder Cup, after coaching the Toronto Marlies to win the 2018 Calder Cup Finals.

After three successful seasons with the Greyhounds, on June 8, 2015, Keefe was named the head coach of the Toronto Marlies of the American Hockey League, the top affiliate of the Toronto Maple Leafs. Keefe coached the Marlies to the franchise's first Calder Cup in 2018 and won a total of 199 games as an American Hockey League head coach. The next year, he signed a two-year extension with the Marlies.

=== Toronto Maple Leafs (2019–2024) ===
On November 20, 2019, Keefe was announced as Mike Babcock's successor after Babcock was relieved of his duties by Maple Leafs' president Brendan Shanahan. The following day, Keefe signed a three-year deal with the Maple Leafs. In Keefe's first 20 games as head coach of the Maple Leafs, the team posted a 15–4–1 record, the best start of any head coach in Toronto's 102-year history. The team's play cooled off somewhat afterwards, and his first season ended in a defeat to the Columbus Blue Jackets in the qualifying round of the expanded 2020 playoffs, the fourth straight season the team failed to advance past the first round of the postseason.

As Keefe prepared for his first full season as head coach, Keefe's team of assistants was overhauled, as assistant coaches Paul McFarland and Andrew Brewer both left the organization. Manny Malhotra and Paul MacLean were brought in as their replacements.

The Maple Leafs fired Keefe on May 9, 2024, following a loss in the first round of the 2024 Stanley Cup playoffs.

=== New Jersey Devils (2024–present) ===
On May 23, 2024, Keefe was named head coach of the New Jersey Devils, signing a reported four-year deal. In Keefe's first year behind the bench with New Jersey, he led them to the playoffs for the first time since 2023. However, they were eliminated in five games by the Carolina Hurricanes. The next season, the Devils struggled and missed the playoffs, marking the first time in his NHL coaching career that Keefe missed the playoffs.

== Personal life ==
His younger brother, Adam, serves as head coach of the Belfast Giants of the Elite Ice Hockey League (EIHL).

== Career statistics ==
=== Regular season and playoffs ===
			Regular season					Playoffs
Season	Team	League	GP	G	A	Pts	PIM	GP	G	A	Pts	PIM
1995–96	Toronto Nationals AAA	Bantam	45	66	71	137	—	—	—	—	—	—
1996–97	Quinte Hawks	MetJHL	44	21	23	44	41	—	—	—	—	—
1996–97	Bramalea Blues	OPJHL	8	0	3	3	4	—	—	—	—	—
1997–98	Caledon Canadians	MetJHL	43	41	40	81	117	13	15	8	23	—
1998–99	Toronto St. Michael's Majors	OHL	38	37	37	74	80	—	—	—	—	—
1998–99	Barrie Colts	OHL	28	14	28	42	60	10	5	5	10	31
1999–2000	Barrie Colts	OHL	66	48	73	121	95	25	10	13	23	41
2000–01	Tampa Bay Lightning	NHL	49	4	0	4	38	—	—	—	—	—
2000–01	Detroit Vipers	IHL	13	7	5	12	23	—	—	—	—	—
2001–02	Tampa Bay Lightning	NHL	39	6	7	13	16	—	—	—	—	—
2001–02	Springfield Falcons	AHL	24	9	9	18	26	—	—	—	—	—
2002–03	Tampa Bay Lightning	NHL	37	2	5	7	24	—	—	—	—	—
2002–03	Springfield Falcons	AHL	33	16	15	31	28	6	0	0	0	4
2003–04	Hershey Bears	AHL	59	16	16	32	82	—	—	—	—	—
2004–05	Utah Grizzlies	AHL	4	0	1	1	0	—	—	—	—	—
NHL totals			125	12	12	24	78	—	—	—	—	—

== Head coaching record ==
† – replaced midseason
‡ – midseason replacement

=== NHL ===
Sheldon Keefe NHL coaching statistics
Team	Year	Regular season						Postseason				
Team	Year	G	W	L	OTL	Pts	Finish	G	W	L	Win %	Result
TOR	2019–20‡	47*	27	15	5	(59)	3rd in Atlantic	5	2	3	.400	Lost in qualifying round (CBJ)
TOR	2020–21	56^{⌑}	35	14	7	77	1st in North	7	3	4	.429	Lost in first round (MTL)
TOR	2021–22	82	54	21	7	115	2nd in Atlantic	7	3	4	.429	Lost in first round (TBL)
TOR	2022–23	82	50	21	11	111	2nd in Atlantic	11	5	6	.455	Lost in second round (FLA)
TOR	2023–24	82	46	26	10	102	3rd in Atlantic	7	3	4	.429	Lost in first round (BOS)
TOR total		349	212	97	40			37	16	21	.432	5 playoff appearances
NJD	2024–25	82	42	33	7	91	3rd in Metropolitan	5	1	4	.200	Lost in first round (CAR)
NJD	2025–26	82	42	37	3	87	7th in Metropolitan	—	—	—	—	Missed playoffs
NJD total		164	84	70	10			5	1	4	.200	1 playoff appearance
Total		513	296	167	50			42	17	25	.405	6 playoff appearances

* Season shortened due to the COVID-19 pandemic during the 2019–20 season. Playoffs were played in August 2020 with a different format.
⌑ Season shortened due to the COVID-19 pandemic during the 2020–21 season.

=== AHL ===
Sheldon Keefe AHL coaching statistics
Team	Year	Regular season						Postseason				
Team	Year	G	W	L	OTL	SOL	Pts	G	W	L	Win %	Result
TOR	2015–16	76	54	16	5	1	114	15	8	7	.750	Lost in third round
TOR	2016–17	76	42	29	4	1	89	11	6	5	.586	Lost in second round
TOR	2017–18	76	54	18	2	2	112	20	15	5	.737	Won Calder Cup
TOR	2018–19	76	39	24	9	4	91	13	9	4	.599	Lost in third round
TOR	2019–20†	16	11	2	2	1	25	—	—	—	.781	—
Total		320	200	89	22	9	431	59	38	21	.673	1 championship 4 playoff appearances

=== OHL ===
Sheldon Keefe OHL coaching statistics
Team	Year	Regular season						Postseason				
Team	Year	G	W	L	OTL	SOL	Pts	G	W	L	Win %	Result
SOO	2012–13‡	68	36	26	3	3	78	6	2	4	.554	Lost in first round
SOO	2013–14	68	44	17	2	5	95	9	4	5	.669	Lost in second round
SOO	2014–15	68	54	12	0	2	110	14	10	4	.793	Lost in third round
Total		204	134	55	5	10	283	29	16	13	.670	3 playoff appearances

=== CCHL ===
Sheldon Keefe CCHL coaching statistics
Team	Year	Regular season							Postseason				
Team	Year	G	W	L	T	OTL	SOL	Pts	G	W	L	Win %	Result
PLK	2006–07	55	41	10	2	2	0	86	15	12	3	.803	Won championship
PLK	2007–08	60	46	11	2	1	0	95	14	12	2	.720	Won championship
PLK	2008–09	60	43	13	—	1	3	90	18	12	6	.700	Won championship
PLK	2009–10	62	52	9	—	1	0	105	17	12	5	.747	Won championship
PLK	2010–11	62	51	9	—	0	2	104	14	12	2	.733	Won championship
PLK	2011–12	62	32	24	—	4	2	70	12	7	5	.580	Lost in second round
PLK	2012–13†	62	38	20	—	1	3	80	—	—	—	.645	—
Total		423	303	96	4	10	10	630	90	67	23	.747	5 championships 6 playoff appearances

== Awards ==
- OHL All-Rookie Team (1999)
- OHL Rookie of the Year (1999)
- OHL Second All-Star Team (2000)
- OHL Top Scorer (2000)
- Canadian Major Junior First All-Star Team (2000)
- Memorial Cup Tournament All-Star Team (2000)

Sporting positions
Preceded by Mike Babcock	Head coach of the Toronto Maple Leafs; 2019–2024	Succeeded by Craig Berube
Preceded by Travis Green (interim)	Head coach of the New Jersey Devils; 2024–present	Incumbent
