= 2011–12 CCHL season =

- League: Central Canada Hockey League
- Sport: Hockey
- Duration: Regular season 2011-09-09 – 2012-03-11; Playoffs; 2012-03-13 – 2012-04-22
- Teams: 12
- Finals champions: Nepean Raiders

CCHL seasons
- 2010–11 2012–13

The 2011–12 CCHL season is the 51st season of the Central Canada Hockey League (CCHL). The twelve teams of the CCHL played 62-game schedules.

In March 2012, the top teams of the league played down for the Bogart Cup, the CCHL championship. The winner of the Bogart Cup competed in the Eastern Canadian Junior "A" championship, the Fred Page Cup. If successful against the winners of the Quebec Junior AAA Hockey League and Maritime Hockey League, the champion would then move on to play in the Canadian Junior Hockey League championship, the 2012 Royal Bank Cup. The Pembroke Lumber Kings of the CCHL were the defending League, Fred Page Cup, and Royal Bank Cup champions.

== Changes ==
- None

== Current Standings ==
Note: GP = Games played; W = Wins; L = Losses; OTL = Overtime losses; SL = Shootout losses; GF = Goals for; GA = Goals against; PTS = Points; x = clinched playoff berth; y = clinched division title; z = clinched league title

Robinson Division
Team	Centre	W–L–OTL–SOL	GF–GA	Points
y-Cornwall Colts	Cornwall, Ontario	43-13-2-4	238-155	92
x-Brockville Braves	Brockville, Ontario	41-17-3-1	242-186	86
x-Carleton Place Canadians	Carleton Place, Ontario	41-18-2-1	265-180	85
x-Hawkesbury Hawks	Hawkesbury, Ontario	35-20-3-4	214-177	77
x-Smiths Falls Bears	Smiths Falls, Ontario	30-30-1-1	220-240	62
Kemptville 73's	Kemptville, Ontario	13-44-1-4	164-299	31
Yzerman Division
Team	Centre	W–L–OTL–SOL	GF–GA	Points
zy-Nepean Raiders	Nepean, Ontario	46-11-4-1	269-159	97
x-Pembroke Lumber Kings	Pembroke, Ontario	32-24-4-2	184-177	70
x-Ottawa Jr. Senators	Ottawa, Ontario	33-26-3-0	221-192	69
Kanata Stallions	Kanata, Ontario	24-32-1-5	214-259	54
Cumberland Grads	Navan, Ontario	21-35-2-4	190-258	48
Gloucester Rangers	Gloucester, Ontario	13-46-1-2	186-325	29

Teams listed on the official league website.

Standings listed on official league website.

== All-Star and Prospects Games ==
The league all-star game took place on December 26, 2011. The teams were divided into "Yzerman's All-Stars" and "Robinson's All-Stars", along divisional lines. The game was played in Smiths Falls, Ontario.

Result:

Yzerman's All-Stars 4 - Robinson's All-Stars 1

The league prospects games took place on December 29, 2011. The teams were divided into "Yzerman's 95's" and "Robinson's 95's", along divisional lines. The game, like the All-Star game, was played in Smiths Falls, Ontario.

Result:

Yzerman's 95's 7 - Robinson's 95's 2

== 2011-12 Bogart Cup Playoffs ==
Quarter-finals
1	Nepean	4
8	Smiths Falls	0
3	Brockville	1
6	Pembroke	4
2	Cornwall	4
7	Ottawa	1
4	Carleton Place	0
5	Hawkesbury	4

Semi-finals
1	Nepean	4
6	Pembroke	3
2	Cornwall	4
5	Hawkesbury	1

Bill Salonen Cup Finals
1	Nepean	4
2	Cornwall	3

Playoff results are listed on the official league website.

== Fred Page Cup Championship ==
Hosted by the Kanata Stallions in Kanata, Ontario. The Kanata Stallions finished in 3rd place, losing the semi-final. The Nepean Raiders finished in 2nd place, losing the final.

Round Robin

Nepean Raiders beat Princeville Titans (QJAAAHL) 4-0
Woodstock Slammers (MHL) beat Kanata Stallions 4-3
Kanata Stallions beat Nepean Raiders 2-1 OT
Woodstock Slammers (MHL) beat Nepean Raiders 3-2
Kanata Stallions beat Princeville Titans (QJAAAHL) 7-4

Semi-final

Nepean Raiders beat Kanata Stallions 6-1

Final

Woodstock Slammers (MHL) beat Nepean Raiders 3-2

== Scoring leaders ==
Note: GP = Games played; G = Goals; A = Assists; Pts = Points; PIM = Penalty minutes

Player	Team	GP	G	A	Pts	PIM
Craig Cowie	Nepean Raiders	61	41	79	120	18
Matt Robertson	Smiths Falls Bears	62	47	54	101	26
Tyson Spink	Cornwall Colts	51	42	50	92	18
Ryan MacLean	Nepean Raiders	62	28	61	89	29
Shayne Morrissey	Carleton Place Canadians	62	34	53	87	12
Michael Borkowski	Cornwall Colts	61	28	59	87	44
Kenneth Neil	Nepean Raiders	60	35	50	85	12
Michael McMurtry	Gloucester Rangers	57	29	44	73	27
Conor Brown	Ottawa Jr. Senators	59	22	51	73	53
Ben Blasko	Brockville Braves	56	22	51	73	23

== Leading goaltenders ==
Note: GP = Games played; Mins = Minutes played; W = Wins; L = Losses: OTL = Overtime losses; SL = Shootout losses; GA = Goals Allowed; SO = Shutouts; GAA = Goals against average

Player	Team	GP	Mins	W	L	OTL	SOL	GA	SO	Sv%	GAA
Lukas Hafner	Cornwall Colts	48	2838:45	34	9	2	2	100	5	0.929	2.11
Matt Zawadzki	Nepean Raiders	37	2107:58	26	6	3	0	82	3	0.919	2.33
Francis Dupuis	Pembroke Lumber Kings	50	2978:32	25	19	4	2	122	2	0.919	2.46
Carmine Guerriero	Hawkesbury Hawks	43	2412:40	22	12	2	3	107	3	0.916	2.66
Andrew Pikul	Brockville Braves	29	1655:03	19	6	1	1	67	1	0.915	2.43

== Players selected in 2012 NHL entry draft ==
- Rd 5 #147 Ben Hutton - Vancouver Canucks (Nepean Raiders)

== Awards ==
- League MVP – Craig Cowie (Nepean Raiders)
- Rookie of the Year – Mackenzie Weegar (Nepean Raiders)
- Most Outstanding Defenceman – Ryan Johnston (Nepean Raiders)
- Sportsmanship and Ability Award – Matt Robertson (Smiths Falls Bears)
- Most Outstanding Goaltender – Francis Dupuis (Pembroke Lumber Kings)
- Team Lowest GAA – Lukas Hafner/Matt Jenkins (Cornwall Colts)
- Top Midget Prospect – Mackenzie Weegar (Nepean Raiders)
- Top Graduating Player – Craig Cowie (Nepean Raiders)
- League Scoring Title – Craig Cowie (Nepean Raiders)

== All-star event ==
The first annual Central Canada Junior A Challenge is an interleague all-star tournament hosted by Smiths Falls, Ontario. The event runs December 27–29, 2011.

See: Central Canada Cup Challenge.

== See also ==
- 2012 Royal Bank Cup
- Fred Page Cup
- Quebec Junior AAA Hockey League
- Maritime Junior Hockey League
- 2011 in ice hockey
- 2012 in ice hockey

Preceded by 2010–11 CCHL season	CCHL seasons	Succeeded by 2012–13 CCHL season
