= 2010–11 CCHL season =

- League: Central Canada Hockey League
- Sport: Hockey
- Duration: Regular season 2010-09-10 – 2011-03-06; Playoffs; 2011-03-08 – 2011-04-14
- Teams: 12
- Finals champions: Pembroke Lumber Kings

CCHL seasons
- 2009–10 2011–12

The 2010–11 CCHL season was the 50th season of the Central Canada Hockey League (CCHL). The twelve teams of the CCHL played a 62-game schedule.

Come March, the top teams of the league played down for the Bogart Cup, the CHL championship. The winner of the Bogart Cup competed in the Eastern Canadian Junior "A" championship, the Fred Page Cup. Once successful against the winners of the Quebec Junior AAA Hockey League and Maritime Hockey League, the champion moved on to play in the Canadian Junior Hockey League championship, the 2011 Royal Bank Cup.

The Pembroke Lumber Kings won the league, the 2011 Fred Page Cup, and the 2011 Royal Bank Cup as National Junior A Champions.

== Changes ==
- League changes name from Central Junior Hockey League to Central Hockey League.
- League changes name again to Central Canada Hockey League (January 2011).

== Current Standings ==
Note: GP = Games played; W = Wins; L = Losses; OTL = Overtime losses; SL = Shootout losses; GF = Goals for; GA = Goals against; PTS = Points; x = clinched playoff berth; y = clinched division title; z = clinched conference title

Robinson Division
Team	Centre	W–L–OTL–SOL	Points
Cornwall Colts	Cornwall, Ontario	48-13-1-0	97
Brockville Braves	Brockville, Ontario	44-15-0-3	91
Carleton Place Canadians	Carleton Place, Ontario	32-26-1-3	68
Smiths Falls Bears	Smiths Falls, Ontario	27-29-3-3	60
Kemptville 73's	Kemptville, Ontario	22-33-2-5	51
Hawkesbury Hawks	Hawkesbury, Ontario	11-46-3-2	27
Yzerman Division
Team	Centre	W–L–OTL–SOL	Points
Pembroke Lumber Kings	Pembroke, Ontario	51-9-0-2	104
Gloucester Rangers	Gloucester, Ontario	35-25-0-2	72
Nepean Raiders	Nepean, Ontario	27-24-6-4	64
Kanata Stallions	Kanata, Ontario	28-28-3-3	62
Ottawa Jr. Senators	Ottawa, Ontario	26-29-2-5	59
Cumberland Grads	Navan, Ontario	21-34-3-4	49

Teams listed on the official league website.

Standings listed on official league website.

== 2010-11 Bogart Cup Playoffs ==
Quarter-finals
1	Pembroke	4
8	Smiths Falls	0
4	Gloucester	4
5	Carleton Place	2
2	Cornwall	4
7	Kanata	1
3	Brockville	4
6	Nepean	3

Semi-finals
1	Pembroke	4
4	Gloucester	0
2	Cornwall	4
3	Brockville	1

Bill Salonen Cup Finals
1	Pembroke	4
2	Cornwall	2

Playoff results are listed on the official league website.

== Fred Page Cup Championship ==
Hosted by the Terrebonne Cobras in Terrebonne, Quebec. The Pembroke Lumber Kings finished in first place.

Round Robin

Pembroke Lumber Kings 11 - Longueuil College Francais (QJAAAHL) 2
Pembroke Lumber Kings 9 - Summerside Western Capitals (MHL) 5
Terrebonne Cobras (QJAAAHL) 6 - Pembroke Lumber Kings 5

Final

Pembroke Lumber Kings 6 - Longueuil College Francais (QJAAAHL) 3

== 2011 Royal Bank Cup Championship ==
Hosted by the Camrose Kodiaks in Camrose, Alberta. The Pembroke Lumber Kings finished in third place in the round robin and won the Semi-final and Final to win the National Championship.

Round Robin

Portage Terriers (MJHL) 5 - Pembroke Lumber Kings 2
Pembroke Lumber Kings 5 - Wellington Dukes (OJHL) 2
Camrose Kodiaks (AJHL) 2 - Pembroke Lumber Kings 1
Vernon Vipers (BCHL) 5 - Pembroke Lumber Kings 3

Semi-final

Pembroke Lumber Kings 4 - Camrose Kodiaks (AJHL) 2

Final

Pembroke Lumber Kings 2 - Vernon Vipers (BCHL) 0

== Scoring leaders ==
Note: GP = Games played; G = Goals; A = Assists; Pts = Points; PIM = Penalty minutes

Player	Team	GP	G	A	Pts	PIM
Jacob Laliberte	Cornwall Colts	62	63	70	133	26
Tyler Tosunian	Pembroke Lumber Kings	60	36	81	117	46
Andrew Creppin	Gloucester Rangers	57	33	78	111	78
Michael Webley	Gloucester Rangers	59	37	64	101	16
Tyson Spink	Cornwall Colts	56	37	61	98	50
Tylor Spink	Cornwall Colts	50	30	57	87	50
Mike McNamee	Smiths Falls Bears	61	40	41	81	14
Ryan Lowe	Carleton Place Canadians	60	24	53	77	46
Brent Norris	Nepean Raiders	58	41	34	75	18
Kyle Rankin	Kanata Stallions	60	22	51	73	48

== Leading goaltenders ==
Note: GP = Games played; Mins = Minutes played; W = Wins; L = Losses: OTL = Overtime losses; SL = Shootout losses; GA = Goals Allowed; SO = Shutouts; GAA = Goals against average

Player	Team	GP	Mins	W	L	OTL	SOL	GA	SO	Sv%	GAA
Pete Karvouniaris	Cornwall Colts	52	3021:08	40	10	0	0	110	6	.933	2.18
Scott Shackell	Kanata Stallions	46	2620:07	26	17	1	1	129	3	.915	2.95
Justin Gilbert	Brockville Braves	36	2141:07	25	10	0	1	88	3	.915	2.47
Jamie Phillips	Pembroke Lumber Kings	33	1856:57	25	6	0	1	66	6	.913	2.13
William Betts	Brockville Braves	27	1601:33	19	5	0	2	67	4	.908	2.51

== Awards ==
- Most Outstandings Player - Jacob Laliberte (Cornwall Colts)
- Scoring Champion - Jacob Laliberte (Cornwall Colts)
- Rookie of the Year - Nathan Pancel (Gloucester Rangers)
- Top Goaltender - Pete Karvouniaris (Cornwall Colts)
- Top Team Goals Against - Cornwall Colts
- Top Defenceman - Youseff Kabbaj (Cornwall Colts)
- Top Prospects Award - Matthew Peca (Pembroke Lumber Kings)
- Most Sportsmanlike Player - Michael Webley (Gloucester Rangers)
- Most Improved Player - Ryan Van Stralen (Smiths Falls Bears)
- Scholastic Player of the Year - Andrew Creppin (Gloucester Rangers)
- Coach of the Year - Adam Dewan (Kanata Stallions)
- Trainer of the Year - Dan McDowell (Nepean Raiders)
- Pat Smith Award/Top Contributor to a Team - Krista Gill (Brockville Braves)
- Manager of the Year - Sheldon Keefe (Pembroke Lumber Kings)

== Players selected in 2011 NHL entry draft ==
- Rd 7 #201 Matthew Peca - Tampa Bay Lightning (Pembroke Lumber Kings)

== See also ==
- 2011 Royal Bank Cup
- Fred Page Cup
- Quebec Junior AAA Hockey League
- Maritime Hockey League
- 2010 in ice hockey
- 2011 in ice hockey

Preceded by 2009–10 CJHL season	CCHL seasons	Succeeded by 2011–12 CCHL season
