= Kemptville 73's =

Central Canada Hockey League team in North Grenville, Ontario

- City: North Grenville
- Division: Robinson
- Founded: 1969
- Home arena: North Grenville Municipal Centre
- Colours: Red; Black
- Owners: Jason York; Joe Jefferies; Paul LeBreux
- General manager: Terry Nichols
- Head coach: Shawn Fensel
- Media: FloSports
- Website: kemptville73s.com

Franchise history
- Since 2007: Kemptville 73's (CCHL)

Previous franchise history
- 1969–1973: Kemptville Comets (EOJBHL)
- 1973–2007: Kemptville 73's (EOJBHL)

The Kemptville 73's are a junior ice hockey club and franchise of the Central Canada Hockey League (CCHL). The team plays its home games at the North Grenville Municipal Centre in North Grenville, Ontario.

== History ==
The club was founded in 1969 as a member of the Rideau-St. Lawrence Junior “B” Hockey League, which later became the Eastern Ontario Junior B Hockey League (EOJBHL). The club was originally known as the Kemptville Comets until 1973.

The 1996–97 Kemptville 73's were inducted into the Kemptville and District Sports Hall of Fame in 2012. The team had gone undefeated in the 1996–97 EOJBHL regular season, and went on to win the Eastern Ontario championship.

Kemptville 73's (EOJBHL)
Season	GP	W	L	OTL	GF	GA	Pts	Regular season	Postseason
1999–00	45	32	10	3	218	127	68	1st overall	Lost final
2000–01	45	30	13	2	217	138	62	1st overall	Lost final
2001–02	45	19	24	2	194	182	43	4th overall	Lost quarterfinal
2002–03	45	21	15	9	210	197	51	3rd overall	Lost semiinal
2003–04	45	30	13	0	228	137	62	3rd overall	Lost quarterfinal
2004–05	45	28	13	4	223	166	60	1st overall	Lost semifinal
2005–06	45	31	12	2	293	196	64	1st overall	Lost semifinal
2006–07	40	21	15	4	217	179	46	4th overall	Lost quarterfinal

The 73's joined the Central Junior A Hockey League (CJHL) in 2007 as an expansion franchise.

Kemptville 73's (CCHL)
Season	GP	W	L	T	OTL	SOL	GF	GA	Pts	Regular season	Postseason
2007–08	60	15	39	2	4	0	164	260	36	6th in division 9th overall	Did not qualify
2008–09	60	15	38	0	4	3	126	225	37	6th in division 10th overall	Did not qualify
2009–10	62	27	29	0	0	6	191	214	60	3rd in division 8th overall	Lost first round against Brockville (4:0)
2010–11	62	22	33	0	2	5	157	225	51	5th in division 10th overall	Did not qualify
2011–12	62	13	44	0	1	4	164	299	31	6th in division 11th overall	Did not qualify
2012–13	62	15	44	0	1	2	152	295	33	6th in division 12th overall	Did not qualify
2013–14	62	26	30	0	2	4	210	232	58	5th in division 8th overall	Lost first round against Carleton Place (4:0)
2014–15	62	26	25	0	6	5	225	223	63	6th in division 9th overall	Lost first round against Gloucester (2:0)
2015–16	62	36	23	0	2	1	224	179	75	5th in division 7th overall	Lost first round against Carleton Place (4:1)
2016–17	62	33	25	0	2	2	216	188	70	4th in division 5th overall	Won quarterfinal against Hawkesbury (4:2); Lost semifinal against Carleton Place (4:2)
2017–18	62	18	40	0	2	2	159	267	40	6th in division 11th overall	Did not qualify
2018–19	62	21	34	0	5	2	176	227	49	6th in division 11th overall	Did not qualify
2019–20	62	26	31	0	4	1	182	230	57	6th in division 10th overall	Post-season cancelled
2020–21	Season cancelled										
2021–22	55	29	18	0	5	3	198	171	66	3rd in division 5th overall	Lost quarterfinal against Renfrew (4:2)
2022–23	55	25	24	0	5	1	199	206	56	5th in division 9th overall	Did not qualify
2023–24	55	25	26	0	1	3	160	170	54	5th in division 9th overall	Did not qualify
2024–25	55	26	23	0	4	2	152	168	58	4th in division 7th overall	Lost quarterfinal against Carleton Place (4:0)
2025–26	55	36	16	0	2	1	208	124	75	2nd in division 4th overall	Won quarterfinal against Navan (4:1); Lost semifinal against Rockland (4:0)

Source: "Kemptville 73's statistics and history". hockeydb.com.

== Notable alumni ==
- Calvin de Haan
- Ben Hutton

== Sources ==
- "Kemptville 73's Junior 1996–1997". kemptvillesportshalloffame.ca. Kemptville & District Sports Hall of Fame.
- "New ownership for Kemptville 73's". thecchl.ca (Press release). Central Canada Hockey League. 12 May 2017.
- "73's Announce New Additions to Ownership Group". kemptville73s.com. Kemptville 73's. 14 May 2020.
