= Dale McTavish =

Canadian ice hockey player

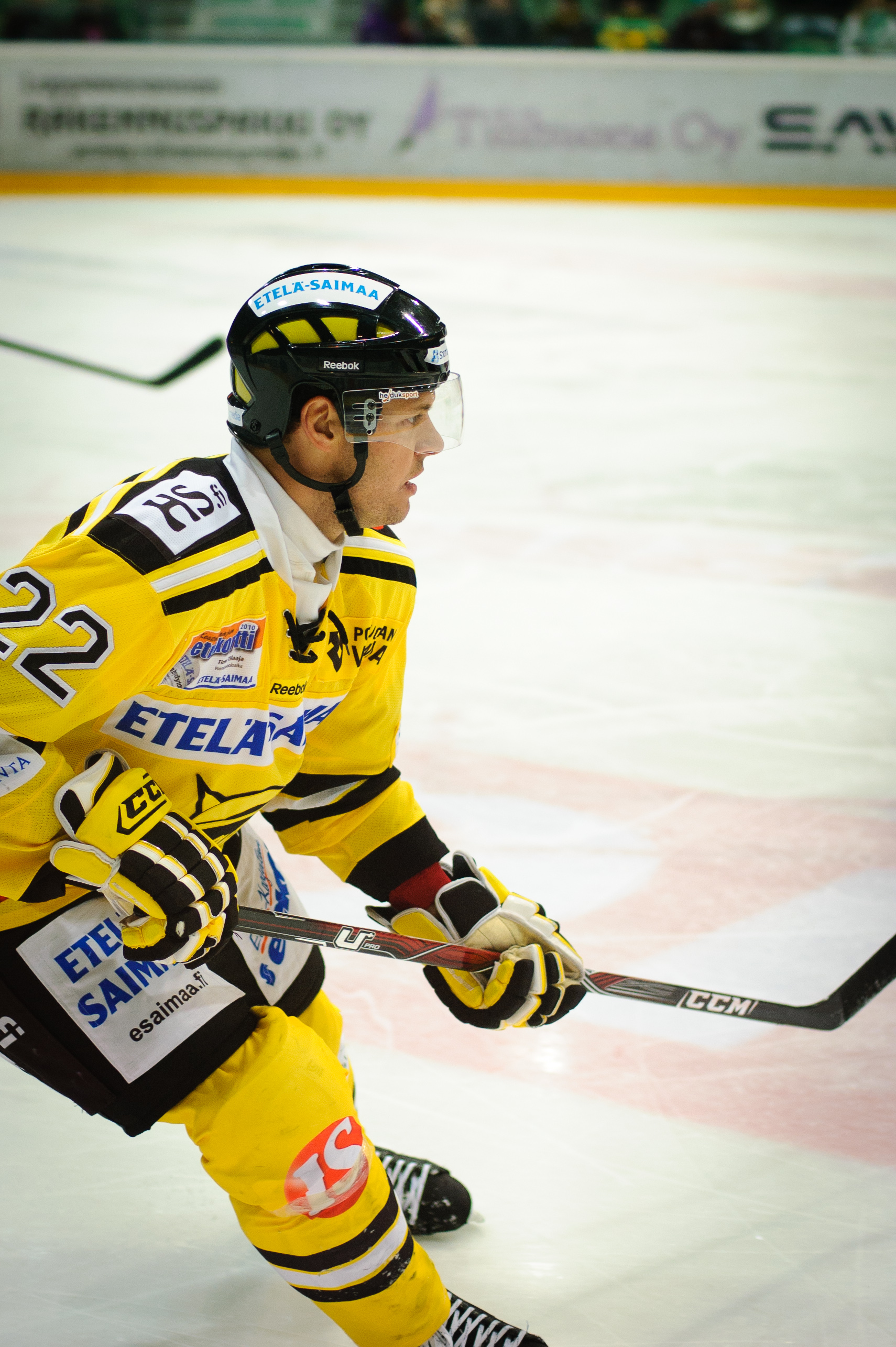
- McTavish in 2010 with SaiPa
- Born: February 28, 1972 (age 54) Eganville, Ontario, Canada
- Height: 6 ft 0 in (183 cm)
- Weight: 205 lb (93 kg; 14 st 9 lb)
- Position: Centre
- Shot: Left
- Played for: Calgary Flames; SaiPa; Espoo Blues; Rapperswil-Jona Lakers; ZSC Lions; EV Zug
- National team: Canada
- NHL draft: Undrafted
- Playing career: 1997–2011

Dale B. McTavish (born February 28, 1972) is a Canadian former professional ice hockey player. McTavish played nine games in the National Hockey League for the Calgary Flames in 1996–97, recording one goal and two assists. He is currently a scout with the Ottawa Senators ice hockey team.

== Playing career ==
McTavish was born in Eganville, Ontario. He played four seasons of junior hockey with the Peterborough Petes of the Ontario Hockey League. He helped lead the Petes to the league championship in 1992–93, and a Memorial Cup berth. Undrafted, McTavish spent two years playing Canadian college hockey with the St. Francis Xavier X-Men before attracting the attention of NHL scouts. McTavish signed a contract with the Flames in 1996 but spent most of the next two seasons in the minors with the Saint John Flames.

McTavish continued his career in Europe in 1997, playing three seasons in the Finnish SM-liiga with SaiPa and the Espoo Blues. With SaiPa he reached SM-liiga semi-finals and was by far the most popular player among SaiPa supporters. In 2000, he moved to Switzerland, where he played for eight seasons: first with Rapperswil-Jona Lakers where he spent five seasons (2000-2005), then for ZSC Lions from 2006-07, and finally EV Zug in 2007-08. For the season 2010-2011, McTavish returned to SaiPa, where his European career started. After that season he retired.

McTavish was a member of Team Canada at the 2007 Spengler Cup.

In 1995, McTavish also played for the New Jersey Rockin' Rollers inline hockey club of Roller Hockey International, where he recorded two goals and three assists in six games.

== Pembroke Lumber Kings ==
Sheldon Keefe, who had owned the Pembroke Lumber Kings since 2003, announced over Twitter on May 29, 2013, that he had sold the team to McTavish. In summer 2019, McTavish sold the team to Alex Armstrong.

== Personal life ==
His son, Mason McTavish, was selected 3rd overall in the 2021 NHL entry draft by the Anaheim Ducks.

== Career statistics ==
=== Regular season and playoffs ===
			Regular season					Playoffs
Season	Team	League	GP	G	A	Pts	PIM	GP	G	A	Pts	PIM
1988–89	Pembroke Lumber Kings	CJHL	56	26	24	50	58	—	—	—	—	—
1989–90	Peterborough Petes	OHL	66	26	35	61	34	12	1	5	6	2
1990–91	Peterborough Petes	OHL	66	21	27	48	44	4	1	0	1	0
1991–92	Peterborough Petes	OHL	60	25	31	56	59	10	2	5	7	11
1992–93	Peterborough Petes	OHL	66	31	50	81	98	21	9	8	17	22
1992–93	Peterborough Petes	M-Cup	—	—	—	—	—	5	2	1	3	16
1993–94	St. Francis Xavier University	AUAA	27	30	24	54	71	—	—	—	—	—
1994–95	St. Francis Xavier University	AUAA	27	25	27	52	59	—	—	—	—	—
1995–96	Canadian National Team	Intl	53	24	32	56	91	—	—	—	—	—
1995–96	Saint John Flames	AHL	4	2	3	5	5	15	5	4	9	15
1996–97	Calgary Flames	NHL	9	1	2	3	2	—	—	—	—	—
1996–97	Saint John Flames	AHL	53	16	21	37	65	3	0	1	1	0
1997–98	SaiPa	SM-l	47	25	18	43	73	3	0	3	3	4
1998–99	SaiPa	SM-l	44	22	17	39	117	7	4	5	9	2
1998–99	Canada	Intl	4	1	1	2	2	—	—	—	—	—
1999–00	Blues	SM-l	53	32	19	51	87	4	1	0	1	12
1999–00	Canada	Intl	4	0	3	3	2	—	—	—	—	—
2000–01	SC Rapperswil–Jona	NLA	44	24	19	43	63	4	1	1	2	4
2001–02	SC Rapperswil–Jona	NLA	41	21	19	40	34	5	3	3	6	4
2002–03	SC Rapperswil–Jona	NLA	37	18	25	43	57	5	4	0	4	2
2003–04	SC Rapperswil–Jona	NLA	13	6	8	14	6	—	—	—	—	—
2004–05	SC Rapperswil–Jona	NLA	44	25	29	54	36	4	1	1	2	16
2004–05	HC Sierre–Anniviers	NLB	—	—	—	—	—	4	1	6	7	0
2005–06	ZSC Lions	NLA	38	17	20	37	98	9	3	7	10	12
2006–07	ZSC Lions	NLA	34	15	17	32	30	7	4	1	5	22
2007–08	EV Zug	NLA	49	32	21	53	78	7	3	3	6	10
2008–09	EV Zug	NLA	18	8	12	20	30	10	3	4	7	6
2009–10	EV Zug	NLA	43	22	19	41	40	12	6	8	14	6
2010–11	SaiPa	SM-l	38	16	6	22	47	—	—	—	—	—
SM-l totals			182	95	60	155	324	14	5	8	13	18
NLA totals			361	188	189	377	472	63	28	28	56	82
NHL totals			9	1	2	3	2	—	—	—	—	—
