= 2008–09 CJHL season =

- League: Central Junior A Hockey League
- Sport: Hockey
- Duration: Regular season 2008-09-12 – 2009-03-06; Playoffs; 2009-03-08 – 2009-04-16
- Teams: 11
- Finals champions: Pembroke Lumber Kings

CJHL seasons
- 2007–08 2009–10

The 2008–09 CJHL season is the 48th season of the Central Junior A Hockey League (CJHL). The eleven teams of the CJHL played 60-game schedules.

In March 2009, the top teams of the league played down for the Bogart Cup, the CJHL championship. The winner of the Bogart Cup competed in the Eastern Canadian Junior "A" championship, the Fred Page Cup. If successful against the winners of the Quebec Junior AAA Hockey League and Maritime Hockey League, the champion would then move on to play in the Canadian Junior Hockey League championship, the 2009 Royal Bank Cup.

== Changes ==
- Orleans Blues become Gloucester Rangers.

== Final standings ==
Note: GP = Games played; W = Wins; L = Losses; OTL = Overtime losses; SL = Shootout losses; GF = Goals for; GA = Goals against; PTS = Points; x = clinched playoff berth; y = clinched division title; z = clinched conference title

Robinson Division
| Team | Centre | W–L–T-OTL | GF | GA | Points |
| z-Cumberland Grads | Navan | 38-16-0-6 | 244 | 187 | 82 |
| x-Ottawa Jr. Senators | Ottawa | 30-23-0-7 | 194 | 201 | 67 |
| x-Cornwall Colts | Cornwall | 30-29-0-1 | 188 | 215 | 61 |
| x-Gloucester Rangers | Gloucester | 26-26-0-8 | 198 | 247 | 60 |
| y-Hawkesbury Hawks | Hawkesbury | 8-47-0-5 | 140 | 300 | 21 |
Yzerman Division
| Team | Centre | W–L–T-OTL | GF | GA | Points |
| x-Pembroke Lumber Kings | Pembroke | 43-13-0-4 | 261 | 145 | 90 |
| z-Nepean Raiders | Nepean | 42-12-0-6 | 248 | 145 | 90 |
| x-Brockville Braves | Brockville | 36-20-0-4 | 240 | 185 | 76 |
| x-Smiths Falls Bears | Smiths Falls | 36-22-0-2 | 247 | 205 | 74 |
| y-Kanata Stallions | Kanata | 26-27-0-7 | 204 | 235 | 59 |
| y-Kemptville 73's | Kemptville | 15-38-0-7 | 126 | 225 | 37 |

(x-) denotes berth into playoffs, (y-) denotes elimination from playoffs, (z-) clinched division.

Teams listed on the official league website.

Standings listed on official league website.

== 2008-09 Bogart Cup Playoffs ==
Quarter-finals
1 | Nepean | 4
8 | Gloucester | 0
4 | Brockville | 4
5 | Smiths Falls | 1
2 | Pembroke | 4
7 | Cornwall | 1
3 | Cumberland | 2
6 | Ottawa | 4

Semi-finals
1 | Nepean | 4
6 | Ottawa | 0
2 | Pembroke | 4
4 | Brockville | 3

Bogart Cup Finals
1 | Nepean | 2
2 | Pembroke | 4

Playoff results are listed on the official league website.

== Fred Page Cup Championship ==
Hosted by the Dieppe Commandos in Moncton, New Brunswick. Pembroke finished in third place.

Round Robin

Summerside Western Capitals (MJAHL) 4 - Pembroke Lumber Kings 3 OT
Dieppe Commandos (MJAHL) 3 - Pembroke Lumber Kings 1
Pembroke Lumber Kings 5 - Sherbrooke Cougars (QJAAAHL) 2

Semi-final

Summerside Western Capitals (MJAHL) 4 - Pembroke Lumber Kings 1

== Scoring leaders ==
Note: GP = Games played; G = Goals; A = Assists; Pts = Points; PIM = Penalty minutes

| Player | Team | GP | G | A | Pts | PIM |
|---|---|---|---|---|---|---|
| Mike Byrd | Brockville Braves | 59 | 28 | 83 | 111 | 26 |
| Andy Starczewski | Pembroke Lumber Kings | 60 | 51 | 56 | 107 | 30 |
| Andrew Calof | Nepean Raiders | 59 | 47 | 53 | 100 | 50 |
| Jacob Laliberte | Cornwall Colts | 50 | 42 | 48 | 90 | 14 |
| Jeffrey Clarke | Cumberland Grads | 58 | 35 | 55 | 90 | 56 |
| Damian Cross | Pembroke Lumber Kings | 59 | 26 | 63 | 89 | 52 |
| Kyle Fletcher | Kanata Stallions | 60 | 41 | 46 | 87 | 43 |
| Marc-Andre Labelle | Cumberland Grads | 53 | 41 | 44 | 85 | 44 |
| Scott Cowie | Nepean Raiders | 60 | 30 | 53 | 83 | 24 |
| Shayne Thompson | Kanata Stallions | 60 | 28 | 55 | 83 | 76 |

== Leading goaltenders ==
Note: GP = Games played; Mins = Minutes played; W = Wins; L = Losses: OTL = Overtime losses; SL = Shootout losses; GA = Goals Allowed; SO = Shutouts; GAA = Goals against average

| Player | Team | GP | Mins | W | L | OTL | SOL | GA | SO | Sv% | GAA |
|---|---|---|---|---|---|---|---|---|---|---|---|
| Eric Levine | Pembroke Lumber Kings | 35 | 2050:03 | 19 | 13 | 0 | 1 | 92 | 4 | 0.920 | 2.69 |
| Adam Laderoute | Cumberland Grads | 42 | 2466:44 | 26 | 11 | 1 | 3 | 109 | 2 | 0.919 | 2.65 |
| Darren MacDonald | Nepean Raiders | 40 | 2433:56 | 25 | 10 | 1 | 4 | 95 | 3 | 0.918 | 2.34 |
| Ben Curley | Kemptville 73's | 31 | 1836:05 | 9 | 19 | 2 | 1 | 105 | 2 | 0.916 | 3.43 |
| Wyatt Galley | Nepean Raiders | 20 | 1205:29 | 17 | 2 | 0 | 1 | 44 | 3 | 0.912 | 2.19 |

== Awards ==
- Most Outstanding Player - Andy Starczewski (Pembroke Lumber Kings)
- Scoring Champion - Mike Byrd (Brockville Braves)
- Rookie of the Year - Mitch Zion (Ottawa Jr. Senators)
- Top Goaltender - Eric Levine (Pembroke Lumber Kings)
- Top Defenceman - Paul Puglisi (Brockville Braves)
- Top Prospects Award - Andrew Calof (Nepean Raiders)
- Most Sportsmanlike Player - Shayne Stockton (Brockville Braves)
- Top Graduating Player - Andy Starczewski (Pembroke Lumber Kings)
- Scholastic Player of the Year - Justin Rothlingshoefer (Cornwall Colts)
- Community Impact Award - Shayne Thomson (Kanata Stallions)
- Coach of the Year - Mark Grady (Cumberland Grads)
- Manager of the Year - Sheldon Keefe (Pembroke Lumber Kings)

== Players taken in the 2009 NHL entry draft ==
- Rd 4 #113 Jeremy Price - Vancouver Canucks (Nepean Raiders)
- Rd 6 #177 David Pacan - Chicago Blackhawks (Cumberland Grads)
- Rd 7 #206 Ben Sexton - Boston Bruins (Nepean Raiders)

== See also ==
- 2009 Royal Bank Cup
- Fred Page Cup
- Quebec Junior AAA Hockey League
- Maritime Hockey League
- 2008 in ice hockey
- 2009 in ice hockey

| Preceded by 2007–08 CJHL season | CHL seasons | Succeeded by 2009–10 CJHL season |
