= Eastern Canada Cup Challenge =

Canadian ice hockey tournament

The Eastern Canada Cup Challenge (ECCC) is a Canadian Junior ice hockey mid-season prospects tournament, featuring All-star teams from Canadian Junior Hockey League and Hockey Canada-sanctioned Junior A leagues from across Ontario, Quebec, and the Maritime Provinces. It was founded in 2011 as the Central Canada Cup Challenge (CCCC).

== History ==
The first tournament of its kind was held in Smiths Falls, Ontario from December 27–29, 2011. The tournament featured teams from the four divisions of the Ontario Junior Hockey League, the Northern Ontario Junior Hockey League All-stars, the two divisions of the Central Canada Hockey League, and the Quebec Junior AAA Hockey League All-stars. The Superior International Junior Hockey League was invited, but declined.

In 2012, the tournament was held again, this time in Wellington, Ontario. The NOJHL decided not to attend the event, so the QJAAAHL, who were dominant in 2011, sent two teams instead of one.

The 2013 edition of the tournament will be hosted by Terrebonne, Quebec and the Quebec Junior AAA Hockey League.

The tournament was renamed the Eastern Canada Cup Challenge in 2015 as the tournament grew to include the Maritime Junior A Hockey League.

== Participating leagues ==
- Central Canada Hockey League (2 teams 2011, 2012, 2014, 2015, 2016, 2017, 1 team 2013)
- Maritime Junior A Hockey League (2 teams 2016, 1 team 2015, 2017)
- Northern Ontario Junior Hockey League (1 team 2011, 2013, 2014, 2015, 2016, 2017)
- Ontario Junior Hockey League (4 teams 2011, 2012, 2014, 2015, 2016, 2017, 2 teams 2013)
- Quebec Junior Hockey League (1 team 2011, 2015, 2016, 2 teams 2012, 2013, 2014, 2017)

== Tournament results ==
Year	Champion	Finalist	Score	Teams	Location
2011	QJAAAHL All-stars	OJHL North	5-1	8	Smiths Falls, ON
2012	OJHL South	CCHL Robinson	1-0 SO	8	Wellington, ON
2013	QJAAAHL St-Louis-Lalime	OJHL South-West	4-2	6	Terrebonne, QC
2014	OJHL Oates	OJHL Nieuwendyk	4-0	9	Etobicoke, ON
2015	QJHL All-stars	CCHL Yzerman	2-0	9	Cornwall, ON
2016	QJHL All-stars	CCHL Robinson	5-1	10	Cornwall, ON
2017	QJHL St-Louis	CCHL Red	4-2	10	Trenton, ON
2018	CCHL Robinson	QJHL St-Louis	5-0	12	Trenton, ON
