= Matthew Peca =

Canadian ice hockey player (born 1993)

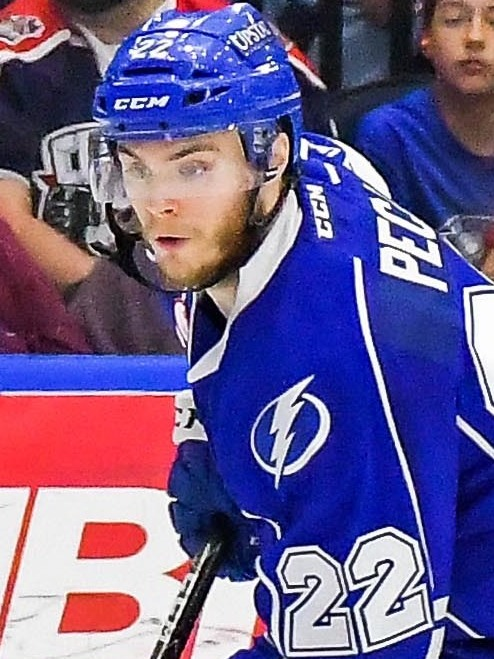
- Peca with the Syracuse Crunch in 2017
- Born: April 27, 1993 (age 33) Petawawa, Ontario, Canada
- Height: 5 ft 9 in (175 cm)
- Weight: 175 lb (79 kg; 12 st 7 lb)
- Position: Centre
- Shoots: Left
- AHL team Former teams: Rochester Americans; Tampa Bay Lightning; Montreal Canadiens; Ottawa Senators; St. Louis Blues
- NHL draft: 201st overall, 2011; Tampa Bay Lightning
- Playing career: 2015–present

Matthew Peca (born April 27, 1993) is a Canadian professional ice hockey forward for the Rochester Americans of the American Hockey League (AHL). He was selected by the Tampa Bay Lightning in the seventh round (201st overall) of the 2011 NHL entry draft. After playing four years at Quinnipiac University, he made his NHL debut during the 2016–17 season.

== Playing career ==
=== Amateur ===
Prior to turning professional, Peca played for the Pembroke Lumber Kings in the Central Canada Hockey League. He won the league title the Royal Bank Cup in his final year with Pembroke. He was drafted by the Windsor Spitfires in the Ontario Hockey League priority. In the offseason before the 2011–12 season, he was claimed off waivers by the Kitchener Rangers but never played for them due to his commitment to Quinnipiac University.

Peca attended Quinnipiac University for four years, where he played four seasons with the Quinnipiac Bobcats men's ice hockey team which competes in NCAA's Division I in the ECAC Hockey conference. He was recognized for his outstanding play with the Bobcats when he was named as a freshman to the 2011–12 ECAC Hockey All-Rookie Team, and in his final season was named to the 2014–15 All-ECAC Hockey First Team and team co-captain.

=== Professional ===
Peca was selected by the Tampa Bay Lightning of the National Hockey League (NHL) in the seventh round in the 2011 NHL entry draft. After graduation from Quinnipac University, Peca signed an amateur try out with the Lightning's American Hockey League (AHL) affiliate, the Syracuse Crunch before signing a two-year entry-level contract with the Lightning on April 1, 2015.

On December 27, 2016, the Lightning announced that Peca would be called up to the NHL roster. On December 28, Peca made his NHL debut in a 4–3 Lightning overtime win over the visiting Montreal Canadiens. On December 31, Peca recorded his first career NHL point, which was an assist on a goal by Alex Killorn. On January 3, 2017, Peca scored his first NHL goal against Connor Hellebuyck of the Winnipeg Jets, making him the first Quinnipiac Bobcat to score a goal in the NHL. On July 5, 2017, Peca signed a one-year, two-way contract extension with the Lightning. On January 4, 2018, Peca was named to the 2018 AHL All-Star game.

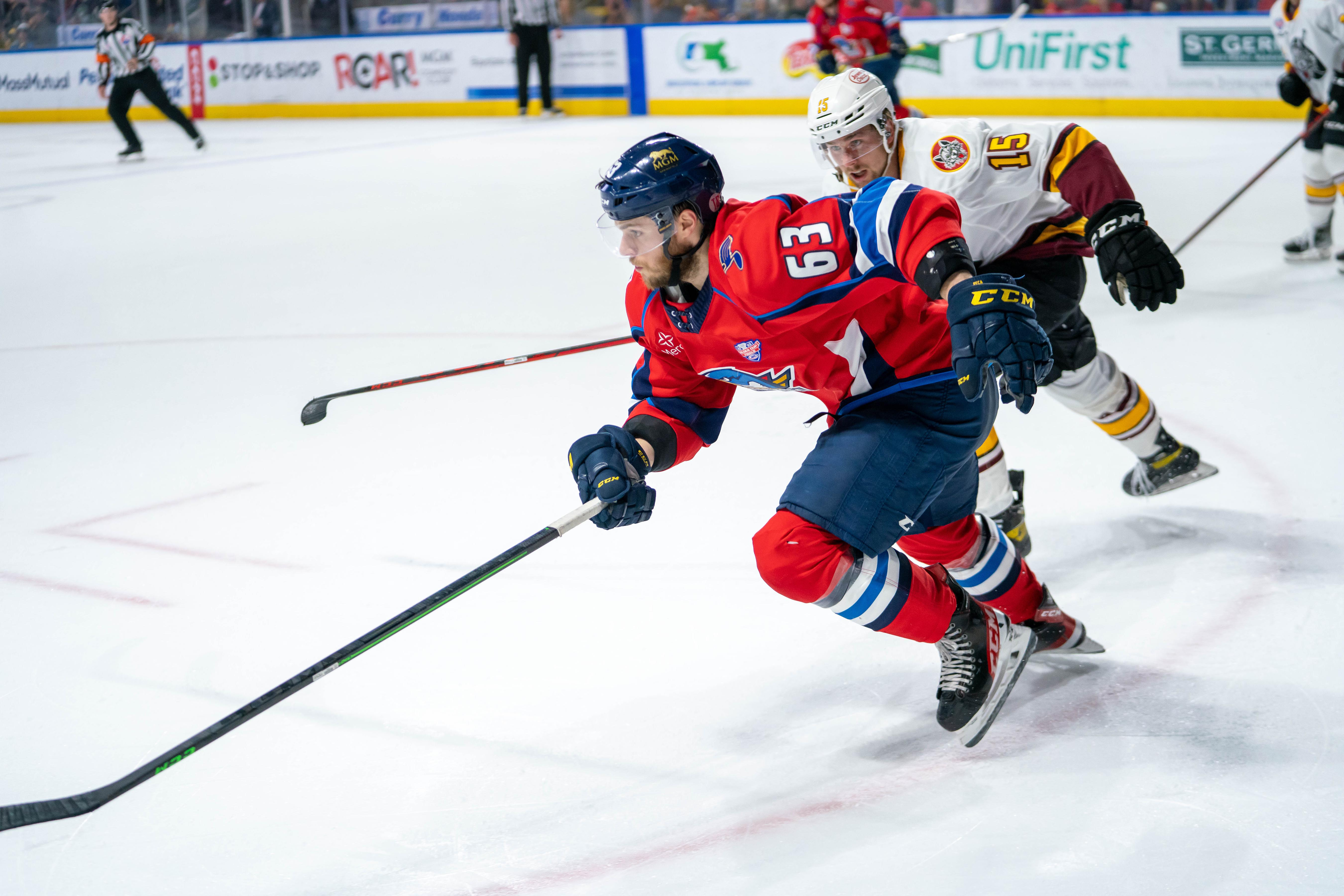
Peca chasing the puck during the 2022 Calder Cup Finals.

As a free agent, Peca signed a two-year, $2.6 million contract with the Montreal Canadiens on July 1, 2018. During the following 2018–19 season, on November 8, 2018, Peca scored his first goal for Montreal in a 6–5 overtime defeat against the Buffalo Sabres. In the final year of his contract with the Canadiens in the 2019–20 season, Peca was unable to keep his role in the NHL through training camp and was placed on waivers before he was assigned to AHL affiliate, the Laval Rocket. He appeared in five scoreless games on recall with Montreal through the season, before he was dealt at the NHL trade deadline to the Ottawa Senators in exchange for Aaron Luchuk and a 2020 draft pick on February 24, 2020. He played in five games for the Senators, registering one assist and an additional 21 games for Ottawa's AHL affiliate, the Belleville Senators, scoring three goals and eleven points.

On July 29, 2021, Peca was signed as a free agent to a one-year, two-way contract with the St. Louis Blues. He was assigned to the Blues' AHL affiliate, the Springfield Thunderbirds after clearing waivers at the beginning of the 2021–22 season. Peca was recalled on December 10, 2021 and played in five games with the Blues, registering one point before being sent to Springfield again on December 20. He was re-signed by the Blues to a two-year contract extension on March 23, 2022.

Peca attended the Blues 2023 training camp but failed to make the roster. He was placed on waivers on October 1, 2023 and after going unclaimed, was assigned to Springfield on October 2 to begin the 2023–24 season. He was named the captain of the Springfield Thunderbirds on opening night of the 2023–24 season, on October 14. On March 14, 2024, he signed a two-year AHL contract extension with the Thunderbirds.

On January 11, 2025, Peca scored his 158th point with the Thunderbirds, with an assist on a Dalibor Dvorský goal, becoming the franchise's points leader, in a 6–4 win over the Providence Bruins. He established new career highs in goals (31) and points (63) in 67 games during the 2024–25 season, and was named to the AHL First All-Star Team for the first time.

On March 10, 2026, Peca, while under contract to the Thunderbirds, was traded in a return to the Syracuse Crunch in exchange for defenceman Wyatt Newpower.

After playing out the remainder of his contract with the Crunch, Peca left as a free agent to sign a two-year AHL contract with the Rochester Americans, affiliate to the Buffalo Sabres, on July 2, 2026.

== Career statistics ==
			Regular season					Playoffs
Season	Team	League	GP	G	A	Pts	PIM	GP	G	A	Pts	PIM
2009–10	Pembroke Lumber Kings	CJHL	60	21	26	47	10	15	3	3	6	6
2010–11	Pembroke Lumber Kings	CCHL	50	26	46	72	14	14	11	10	21	6
2011–12	Quinnipiac University	ECAC	39	8	31	39	12	—	—	—	—	—
2012–13	Quinnipiac University	ECAC	39	15	15	30	36	—	—	—	—	—
2013–14	Quinnipiac University	ECAC	40	12	26	38	16	—	—	—	—	—
2014–15	Quinnipiac University	ECAC	39	7	29	36	27	—	—	—	—	—
2014–15	Syracuse Crunch	AHL	8	1	3	4	0	3	1	1	2	2
2015–16	Syracuse Crunch	AHL	65	8	35	43	10	—	—	—	—	—
2016–17	Syracuse Crunch	AHL	68	12	29	41	14	22	4	10	14	4
2016–17	Tampa Bay Lightning	NHL	10	1	1	2	2	—	—	—	—	—
2017–18	Syracuse Crunch	AHL	63	13	33	46	18	6	3	6	9	2
2017–18	Tampa Bay Lightning	NHL	10	2	3	5	0	—	—	—	—	—
2018–19	Montreal Canadiens	NHL	39	3	7	10	4	—	—	—	—	—
2019–20	Laval Rocket	AHL	34	4	9	13	12	—	—	—	—	—
2019–20	Montreal Canadiens	NHL	5	0	0	0	0	—	—	—	—	—
2019–20	Ottawa Senators	NHL	9	0	2	2	0	—	—	—	—	—
2020–21	Ottawa Senators	NHL	5	0	1	1	0	—	—	—	—	—
2020–21	Belleville Senators	AHL	21	3	8	11	5	—	—	—	—	—
2021–22	Springfield Thunderbirds	AHL	68	23	37	60	16	18	6	10	16	2
2021–22	St. Louis Blues	NHL	5	0	1	1	0	—	—	—	—	—
2022–23	Springfield Thunderbirds	AHL	38	9	26	35	4	2	0	0	0	0
2023–24	Springfield Thunderbirds	AHL	48	12	29	41	18	—	—	—	—	—
2024–25	Springfield Thunderbirds	AHL	68	31	32	63	16	3	0	1	1	0
2025–26	Springfield Thunderbirds	AHL	49	8	26	34	12	—	—	—	—	—
2025–26	Syracuse Crunch	AHL	14	4	9	13	8	4	0	0	0	0
NHL totals			83	6	15	21	6	—	—	—	—	—

== Awards and honours ==
Award	Year
College
ECAC Hockey All-Rookie Team	2011–12
All-ECAC Hockey First Team	2014–15
AHL
AHL All-Star game	2018
First All-Star Team	2024–25
