= Pembroke Lumber Kings =

Former Central Canada Hockey League team in Ontario

- City: Pembroke, Ontario, Canada
- League: Central Canada Hockey League (1980–2026)
- Division: West Division
- Founded: 1964
- Operated: 1964–1979; 1980–2026
- Home arena: Pembroke Memorial Centre
- Colours: Red, white

The Pembroke Lumber Kings (colloquially referred to as the Kings) were a Junior A ice hockey team based in Pembroke, Ontario. The Lumber Kings competed in the Central Canada Hockey League (CCHL) as a member of the West Division. The franchise was one of the "Original Five" teams of the league. Founded in 1964, the team folded in 1979, but came back in 1980. Following legal disputes with team ownership, the CCHL terminated the Lumber Kings franchise in 2026, and a new franchise named Pembroke Royals took its place for the 2026-27 season.

The Lumber Kings have won the most Bogart Cup championships of any CCHL franchise since its existence (14), including two in a row in 1983–84 and 1984–85, and five in a row between 2006–07 and 2010–11. The Kings played their home games at Pembroke Memorial Centre from 1964 until 1979, for 15 seasons. They got sold to a new ownership group, and came back for the 1980–81 season, and moved into Pembroke Memorial Centre again.

== History ==
The Pembroke Lumber Kings were the oldest member of the CCHL, having begun operations in 1961. However, in 1979–80 the Lumber Kings were suspended for one season and replaced with the Pembroke Royals. The Pembroke Lumber Kings were approved to rejoin the league for 1980–81.

The Pembroke Lumber Kings won a total of 14 Art Bogart Cup league championships between 1973 and 2011. Six of those championships came in the 1980s when the Kings were coached by Jim Farelli. Farelli coached 420 games for the Kings, the most of any coach in Lumber Kings history. His teams advanced to the Art Bogart Cup championship series eight consecutive years, winning six titles. This included three consecutive championships from 1987 to 1989, tying the record for longest streak set by the Cornwall Royals (1966–1968).

The Kings had previously won three Art Bogart Cups in the 1970s. The 1972–73 team was coached by Mac MacLean and made it to the Centennial Cup Canadian Junior A Final, losing 4 games to 1 to the Portage la Prairie Terriers. Under coach Bryan Murray the Kings won consecutive titles in 1977 and 1978. The 1977 team made it to the Centennial Cup Final, losing to the Prince Albert Raiders. Murray was fired by the Lumber Kings after the 1978 season. Three years later he was starting a long NHL coaching/general manager career as coach of the Washington Capitals.

The Lumber Kings broke their own (shared) league record by winning five consecutive Art Bogart Cup championships from 2007 to 2011, appearing in five Fred Page Cup tournaments for the Eastern Canada Junior A championships (2006 as hosts), winning in 2007 and 2011, and finishing as finalists in 2006, 2008, and 2010. In 2011, the Pembroke Lumber Kings became only the second team since the 1976 Rockland Nationals to win the National Junior A championship. The team was led by owner, coach and general manager Sheldon Keefe, who had purchased the Kings in June 2006.

Keefe announced on May 29, 2013, that he had sold the Pembroke Lumber Kings to former Calgary Flames player (9 games) and Eganville native Dale McTavish. With Keefe no longer in charge of ownership, general management and coaching duties, the Lumber Kings' success began to fade away, despite making the league finals in 2015, losing to Carleton Place; and failing to qualify for the playoffs for the first time in 13 years in 2017.

The team was sold to Alex Armstrong in June 2019.

Armstrong was suspended in 2025, from all hockey activities following a maltreatment lawsuit. Following an appeal, the CCHL terminated Armstrong's ownership in April 2026, and offered the franchise for sale.

On July 31, 2026, the CCHL terminated of the Pembroke Lumber Kings following legal issues with Armstrong. A new Pembroke Junior A Hockey Club franchise would participate in the 2026-27 CCHL season.

== Notable alumni ==
- Mike Eastwood
- Derek Holmes
- Dale McTavish
- Mason McTavish
- Matthew Peca
- Joe Reekie
- Eric Selleck
- P.J. Stock
- Peter White
- Dmytro Yakushyn
- Tim Young
- Dainius Zubrus

== Retired numbers ==
- 8 – Ben Reinhardt (2006–11), winner of five CCHL championships, two Fred Page Cup championships, and one Royal Bank Cup championship.
- 11 – Gale Linton (1971–72), killed in a car accident while reporting to training camp on October 1, 1972.
- 16 – Larry Mick (1963–66), drafted by the Minnesota North Stars 13th overall in the 1967 NHL Amateur Draft.

== Season by season record ==
Note: GP = Games Played, W = Wins, L = Losses, T = Ties, OTL = Overtime Losses, SOL = Shootout Losses, GF = Goals for, GA = Goals against, Pts = Points

Season	GP	W	L	T	OTL	GF	GA	Pts	Finish	Playoff Results
1958–59	16	10	6	0	—	—	—	20	3rd IPJHL	Won League
1959–60	20	13	7	0	—	122	93	26	3rd IPJHL	Lost final
1960–61	19	13	4	2	—	104	66	28	1st IPJHL	Won League
1961–62	30	16	8	4	—	—	—	36	3rd OHDJHL	Lost final
1962–63	32	20	10	2	—	180	128	42	3rd OHDJHL	Lost semifinal
1963–64	32	22	8	2	—	—	—	46	2nd OHDJHL	Lost final
1964–65	35	17	12	6	—	171	146	40	4th CJHL	Lost quarterfinal
1965–66	36	27	9	0	—	203	175	54	3rd CJHL	Lost semifinal
1966–67	50	18	24	8	—	179	234	44	4th CJHL	Lost semifinal
1967–68	39	15	18	6	—	158	174	36	4th CJHL	Lost semifinal
1968–69	40	13	23	4	—	146	149	30	3rd CJHL	Lost final
1969–70	40	13	21	6	—	136	176	32	3rd CJHL	
1970–71	48	13	34	1	—	164	254	27	5th CJHL	
1971–72	48	20	26	2	—	206	220	42	4th CJHL	
1972–73	55	47	4	4	—	368	183	98	1st CJHL	Won League, won HDMT
1973–74	50	26	20	4	—	235	215	56	3rd CJHL	
1974–75	50	28	13	9	—	280	215	65	1st CJHL	Lost semifinal
1975–76	50	16	28	6	—	209	310	38	6th CJHL	
1976–77	50	28	17	5	—	282	223	61	2nd CJHL	Won League, won HDMT
1977–78	48	31	13	4	—	284	220	66	1st CJHL	Won League
1978–79	48	21	23	4	—	254	262	46	4th CJHL	
1979–80	Franchise suspended									
1980–81	50	13	32	5	—	185	219	31	5th CJHL	
1981–82	50	25	20	5	—	259	190	55	3rd CJHL	Won League
1982–83	48	29	16	3	—	237	164	61	2nd CJHL	
1983–84	54	25	20	9	—	348	295	59	4th CJHL	Won League
1984–85	54	38	13	1	2	355	213	79	1st CJHL	Won League
1985–86	60	42	15	1	2	376	238	78*	2nd CJHL	
1986–87	54	39	10	1	4	323	179	83	1st CJHL	
1987–88	56	42	10	2	2	395	217	88	2nd CJHL	
1988–89	56	39	12	1	4	319	195	83	1st CJHL	
1989–90	56	21	28	4	3	218	280	49	5th CJHL	
1990–91	54	26	24	1	3	220	221	56	6th CJHL	
1991–92	57	30	24	1	2	291	274	63	5th CJHL	
1992–93	57	29	21	3	4	285	264	65	7th CJHL	
1993–94	57	30	21	3	3	293	292	66	6th CJHL	
1994–95	53	26	19	5	3	290	272	60	4th CJHL	
1995–96	54	18	29	7	0	237	290	43	4th in West	
1996–97	53	22	24	7	0	166	197	51	5th in West	
1997–98	56	14	34	8	3	215	255	39	5th in West	
1998–99	54	20	31	3	0	202	242	43	5th in West	
1999–00	56	23	28	5	0	244	255	51	5th in West	
2000–01	55	33	17	5	0	261	184	73	1st in West	
2001–02	55	27	19	10	0	236	207	64	2nd in West	
2002–03	55	16	33	6	2	228	265	40	4th in West	Did not qualify
2003–04	55	23	28	3	1	217	242	50	4th in West	Did not qualify
2004–05	57	37	14	5	1	236	169	80	2nd in West	Lost semifinals
2005–06	59	50	7	1	1	320	116	102	1st in West	Lost semifinals, Hosted FPC
2006–07	55	41	10	2	2	261	133	86	1st in West	Won League, won FPC
2007–08	60	46	11	2	1	281	138	95	1st CJHL	Won League
Season	GP	W	L	OTL	SOL	GF	GA	Pts	Finish	Playoff Results
2008–09	60	43	13	4	3	248	145	90	2nd CJHL	Won League
2009–10	62	52	9	1	0	288	144	105	2nd CJHL	Won League
2010–11	62	51	9	2	2	300	142	104	1st CCHL	Won League, won FPC, won RBC
2011–12	62	32	24	6	2	184	177	70	6th CCHL	Lost semifinals
2012–13	62	38	20	4	3	235	185	80	5th CCHL	Lost quarterfinals
2013–14	62	37	19	6	4	229	184	80	4th CCHL	Lost semifinals
2014–15	62	42	13	4	3	266	174	91	2nd of 6 in West; 3 of 12 CCHL	Won quarterfinals 4–1 (Braves); Won semifinals 4–3 (Junior Senators); Lost finals 1–4 (Canadians)
2015–16	62	34	23	4	1	197	163	73	3rd of 6 in West; 8th of 12 CCHL	Lost quarterfinals 1–4 (Canadians)
2016–17	62	22	38	2	0	165	220	46	6th of 6 in West; 12th of 12 CCHL	Did not qualify
2017–18	62	32	25	4	1	213	223	69	4th of 6 in West; 7th of 12 CCHL	Lost quarterfinals 2–4 (Junior Senators)
2018–19	62	27	34	1	0	188	232	55	5th of 6 in West; 10th of 12 CCHL	Did not qualify
2019–20	62	32	27	2	1	187	215	67	4th of 6 in West; 7th of 12 CCHL	Playoffs suspended due to COVID-19 pandemic
2020–21
2021–22	55	30	21	2	2	167	159	64	4th of 6 in West; 6th of 12 CCHL	Lost quarterfinals
2022–23	55	10	40	2	3	132	248	25	6th of 6 in West; 12th of 12 CCHL	Did not qualify
2023–24	55	24	24	5	2	146	179	55	4th of 6 in West; 8th of 12 CCHL	Lost Quarterfinals 2–4 (Grads)
2024–25	55	28	24	2	1	194	177	59	3rd of 6 in West; 5th of 12 CCHL	Lost Quarterfinals 2–4 (Bears)
2025-26	55	10	42	2	1	143	292	23	6th of 6 in West; 12th of 12 CCHL	Did not qualify

(*) denotes the removal of 9 points from Pembroke's totals by the CJHL for disciplinary reasons.
The Lumber Kings lost their franchise prior to the start of the 1979–80 season for failing to remain in good standing with the league.

== Fred Page Cup ==
Eastern Canada championships
MHL - QAAAJHL - CCHL - Host
Round robin play with 2nd vs 3rd in semi-final to advance against 1st in the finals.

Year	Round Robin	Record	Standing	Semifinal	Gold Medal Game
1999	?, Restigouche River Rats ?-? ?, Coaticook Frontaliers ?-? ?, Kanata Valley Lasers ?-?	?-?-?	?? of 4	n/a	W, Restigouche River Rats 4–1; Fred Page Cup Champions advance to Royal Bank Cup
2000 *	W, Coaticook Frontaliers 6–1; L, Halifax Oland Exports 6–8; L, Cornwall Colts 2–5	1–2–0	3rd of 4	L, Halifax Oland Exports 4–8	n/a
2006 *	W, Joliette Action 8–1; OTW, Woodstock Slammers 4–3; W, Hawkesbury Hawks 5–1	3–0–0	1st of 4	n/a	L, Joliette Action 2–4
2007	OTW, St. Jerome Panthers 2–1; W, Joliette Action 4–1; L, Truro Bearcats 5–1	2–1–0	1st of 4	n/a	W, St. Jerome Panthers 5–2; Fred Page Cup Champions advance to Royal Bank Cup
2008	W, Weeks Crushers 2–1; OTW, Yarmouth Mariners 3–2; L, College Champain Cougars 1–2	2–1–0	1st of 4	n/a	L, Weeks Crushers 1–4
2009	L, Summerside Western Capitals 3–4; L, Dieppe Commandos 1–3; W, Sherbrooke Cougars 5–2	1–2–0	3rd of 4	L, Summerside Western Capitals 1–4	n/a
2010	OTW, Terrebonne Cobras 6–5; L, Brockville Braves 1–2; W, Woodstock Slammers 7–4	2–1–0	2nd of 4	W, Terrebonne Cobras 6–4	L, Brockville Braves 1–5
2011	W, Longueuil Collège Français 11–3; W, Summerside Western Capitals 9–5; L, Terrebonne Cobras 5–6	2–1–0	1st of 4	n/a	W, Longueuil Collège Français 6–3; Fred Page Cup Champions advance to Royal Bank Cup

- Tournament host

== Royal Bank Cup ==
Canadian national championships
Dudley Hewitt Champions - Central, Fred Page Champions - Eastern, Western Canada Cup Champions - Western, Western Canada Cup - Runners Up and Host
Round robin play with top 4 in semi-final and winners to finals.

Year	Round Robin	Record	Standing	Semifinal	Gold Medal Game
2007	L, Prince George Spruce Kings 2–5; W, Aurora Tigers 5–3; L, Camrose Kodiaks 0–3; W, Selkirk Steelers 4–2	2–2	4th of 5	OTL, Aurora Tigers 2–3	na
2011	L, Portage Terriers 2–5; W, Wellington Dukes 5–2; L, Camrose Kodiaks 1–2; L, Vernon Vipers 3–5	1–3	3rd of 5	W, Camrose Kodiaks 4–2	W, Vernon Vipers 2–0; Royal Bank Cup Champions

- Tournament host

== Championships ==
CJHL Art Bogart Cup championships: 1973, 1977, 1978, 1982, 1984, 1985, 1987, 1988, 1989, 2007, 2008, 2009, 2010, 2011
Central Canadian Dudley Hewitt Cup championships: 1973, 1977, 1987, 1988
Eastern Canadian Fred Page Cup championships: 2007, 2011
CJAHL Royal Bank Cup championships: 2011

Preceded by Vernon Vipers	Royal Bank Cup champions 2011	Succeeded by Penticton Vees
