= 2015–16 NCAA Division I men's ice hockey season =

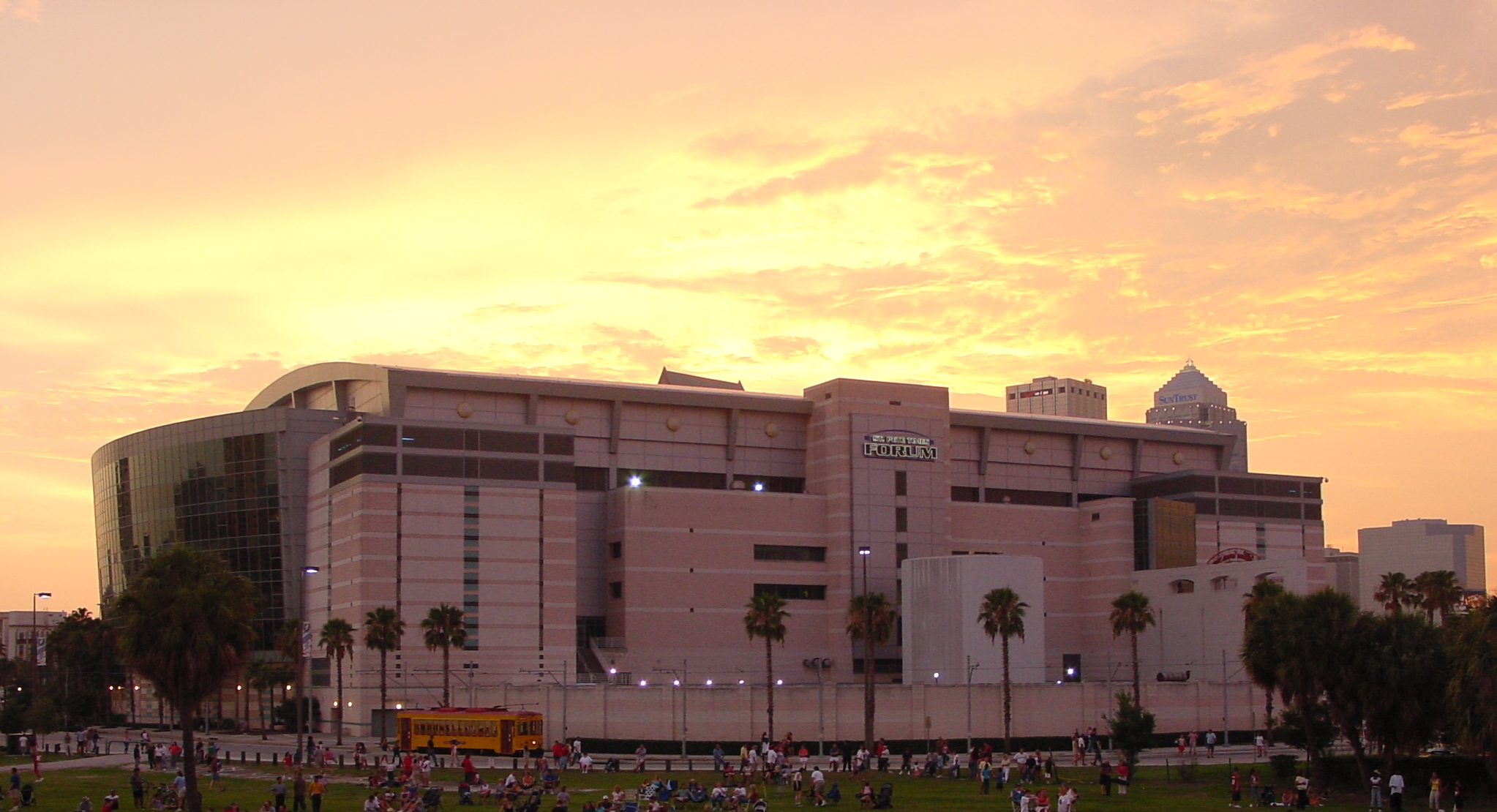
- Amalie Arena in Tampa hosted the 2016 Frozen Four
- Duration: October 3, 2015– April 9, 2016
- NCAA tournament: 2016
- National championship: Amalie Arena; Tampa, Florida
- NCAA champion: North Dakota
- Hobey Baker Award: Jimmy Vesey (Harvard)

The 2015–16 NCAA Division I men's ice hockey season began in October 2015 and ended with the 2016 NCAA Division I men's ice hockey tournament's championship game on April 9, 2016. This was the 69th season in which an NCAA ice hockey championship was held, and the 122nd year overall in which an NCAA school fielded a team.

On January 22, 2016, Boston College coach Jerry York became the first NCAA hockey coach to win 1,000 games and only the second coach in the professional or amateur level to achieve 1,000 wins. The only other coach to achieve this feat was Scotty Bowman.

== Regular season ==
=== Standings ===
- 2015–16 Atlantic Hockey standings
  	Conference record							Overall record					
  	GP	W	L	T	PTS	GF	GA	GP	W	L	T	GF	GA
  Robert Morris †	28	18	6	4	40	116	69	39	24	11	4	158	107
  Air Force	28	16	7	5	37	85	60	37	20	12	5	110	86
  Holy Cross	28	16	7	5	37	89	59	36	18	13	5	109	90
  Mercyhurst	28	15	9	4	34	86	82	36	17	15	4	108	115
  #20 RIT *	28	14	9	5	33	93	77	39	18	15	6	118	116
  Army	28	8	11	9	25	64	74	38	14	15	9	88	89
  Canisius	28	10	13	5	25	72	82	39	12	22	5	92	121
  Bentley	28	9	13	6	24	74	85	40	14	20	6	106	124
  Sacred Heart	28	10	15	3	23	72	78	37	13	20	4	96	109
  Niagara	28	5	18	5	15	58	95	37	6	25	6	71	126
  American International	28	6	19	3	15	57	105	39	7	29	3	80	159
  Championship: March 19, 2016 † indicates conference regular season champion; * indicates conference tournament champion Final rankings: USCHO.com Top 20 Poll
- 2015–16 Big Ten ice hockey standings
  	Conference record								Overall record					
  	GP	W	L	T	SOW	PTS	GF	GA	GP	W	L	T	GF	GA
  Minnesota†	20	14	6	0	0	42	76	58	37	20	17	0	121	108
  #6 Michigan*	20	12	5	3	2	41	107	68	38	25	8	5	181	115
  Penn State	20	10	9	1	1	32	64	72	38	21	13	4	140	122
  Ohio State	20	8	8	4	1	29	79	77	36	14	18	4	128	125
  Michigan State	20	6	12	2	0	21	47	72	37	10	23	4	93	124
  Wisconsin	20	3	13	4	2	15	54	80	35	8	19	8	93	127
  Championship: March 18, 2017 † indicates conference regular season champion; * indicates conference tournament champion Rankings: USCHO.com Top 20 Poll; updated March 12, 2016
- 2015–16 NCAA Division I Independent ice hockey standings
  	Overall record					
  	GP	W	L	T	GF	GA
  Arizona State	29	5	22	2	46	116
  Rankings: USCHO.com Top 20 Poll; updated March 1, 2016
- 2015–16 ECAC Hockey men's standings
  	Conference record							Overall record					
  	GP	W	L	T	PTS	GF	GA	GP	W	L	T	GF	GA
  #2 Quinnipiac † *	22	16	1	5	37	84	44	43	32	4	7	163	85
  #10 Yale	22	14	5	3	31	57	37	32	19	9	4	86	57
  #9 Harvard	22	12	6	4	28	72	47	34	19	11	4	116	81
  #17 St. Lawrence	22	11	8	3	25	68	50	37	19	14	4	106	84
  Clarkson	22	10	9	3	23	52	51	38	20	15	3	101	95
  Rensselaer	22	8	7	7	23	47	49	40	18	15	7	97	104
  Dartmouth	22	11	11	0	22	60	69	35	18	16	1	94	104
  #18 Cornell	22	8	8	6	22	46	50	34	16	11	7	79	82
  Union	22	6	10	6	18	53	62	36	13	14	9	91	96
  Colgate	22	6	14	2	14	45	71	37	11	24	2	95	132
  Brown	22	3	13	6	12	47	70	31	5	19	7	75	107
  Princeton	22	3	16	3	9	40	71	31	5	23	3	60	99
  Championship: March 19, 2016 † indicates conference regular season champion (Cleary Cup) * indicates conference tournament champion (Whitelaw Cup); Rankings: USCHO.com Top 20 Poll; updated March 8, 2016
- 2015–16 Hockey East men's standings
  	Conference record							Overall record					
  	GP	W	L	T	PTS	GF	GA	GP	W	L	T	GF	GA
  #5 Boston College †	22	15	2	5	35	91	45	41	28	8	5	156	82
  #3 Providence †	22	16	3	3	35	71	39	38	27	7	4	124	71
  #13 Notre Dame	22	15	5	2	32	70	40	37	19	11	7	115	86
  #8 Massachusetts–Lowell	22	12	6	4	28	58	37	40	25	10	5	121	75
  #11 Boston University	22	12	6	4	28	75	56	36	21	10	5	124	106
  #14 Northeastern *	22	10	8	4	24	75	56	41	22	14	5	134	105
  Merrimack	22	5	10	7	17	50	70	39	13	19	7	95	108
  Connecticut	22	6	12	4	16	49	70	36	11	21	4	88	114
  Vermont	22	6	13	3	15	48	66	40	15	22	3	86	107
  New Hampshire	22	4	12	6	14	57	73	37	11	20	6	112	121
  Maine	22	5	15	2	12	42	77	38	8	24	6	76	129
  Massachusetts	22	2	16	4	8	44	101	36	8	24	4	84	146
  Championship: March 19, 2016 † indicates conference regular season champion; * indicates conference tournament champion Rankings: USCHO.com Top 20 Poll; updated March 8, 2016
- 2015–16 National Collegiate Hockey Conference standings
  	Conference record								Overall record					
  	GP	W	L	T	SOW	PTS	GF	GA	GP	W	L	T	GF	GA
  #1 North Dakota†	24	19	4	1	1	59	89	49	44	34	6	4	162	81
  #4 St. Cloud State*	24	17	6	1	1	53	104	53	41	31	9	1	175	90
  #6 Denver	24	17	5	2	0	53	74	52	41	25	10	6	134	96
  #16 Minnesota–Duluth	24	11	10	3	1	37	64	44	40	19	16	5	107	82
  Miami	24	9	13	2	2	31	54	65	36	15	18	3	86	97
  Omaha	24	8	15	1	0	25	60	83	36	18	17	1	103	107
  Western Michigan	24	5	18	1	1	17	56	103	36	8	25	3	80	142
  Colorado College	24	4	19	1	0	13	47	99	36	6	29	1	71	145
  Champions: St. Cloud State † indicates conference regular season champion; * indicates conference tournament champion Rankings: USCHO.com Top 20 Poll; updated March 13, 2016
- 2015–16 Western Collegiate Hockey Association standings
  	Conference record							Overall record					
  	GP	W	L	T	PTS	GF	GA	GP	W	L	T	GF	GA
  #12 Michigan Tech †	28	18	7	3	39	92	55	37	23	9	5	123	77
  #15 Minnesota State †	28	16	5	7	39	82	48	41	21	13	7	105	80
  Bowling Green	28	16	7	5	37	81	59	42	22	14	6	118	91
  Ferris State*	28	13	11	4	30	73	70	41	20	15	6	112	109
  Northern Michigan	28	12	11	5	29	65	69	38	15	16	7	89	99
  Bemidji State	28	11	12	5	27	66	66	39	17	16	6	96	96
  Lake Superior State	28	10	13	5	25	49	71	41	14	22	5	74	105
  Alaska	28	8	16	4	20	65	87	36	10	22	4	86	117
  Alaska Anchorage	28	8	18	2	18	63	84	34	11	20	3	81	103
  Alabama–Huntsville	28	5	17	6	16	61	88	34	7	21	6	73	106
  Championship: Ferris State † indicates conference regular season champion (MacNaughton Cup); * indicates conference tournament champion (Broadmoor Trophy); Rankings: USCHO.com Top 20 Poll; updated March 8, 2016

== 2016 NCAA tournament ==
Regional semifinals
1	Quinnipiac	4
4	RIT	0
East Regional
2	Massachusetts–Lowell	3*
3	Yale	2
1	Providence	1
4	Minnesota–Duluth	2
Northeast Regional
2	Boston College	4
3	Harvard	1
1	St. Cloud State	4
4	Ferris State	5*
West Regional
2	Denver	7
3	Boston University	2
1	North Dakota	6
4	Northeastern	2
Midwest Regional
2	Michigan	3*
3	Notre Dame	2

Regional Finals
1	Quinnipiac	4
2	Massachusetts–Lowell	1
4	Minnesota–Duluth	2
2	Boston College	3
4	Ferris State	3
2	Denver	6
1	North Dakota	5
2	Michigan	2

Frozen Four
E1	Quinnipiac	3
NE2	Boston College	2
W2	Denver	2
MW1	North Dakota	4

National championship
E1	Quinnipiac	1
MW1	North Dakota	5

Note: * denotes overtime period(s)

== Player stats ==
=== Scoring leaders ===
GP = Games played; G = Goals; A = Assists; Pts = Points; PIM = Penalty minutes

Player	Class	Team	GP	G	A	Pts	PIM
Kyle Connor	Freshman	Michigan	38	35	36	71	6
J. T. Compher	Junior	Michigan	38	16	47	63	28
Brock Boeser	Freshman	North Dakota	42	27	33	60	26
Tyler Motte	Junior	Michigan	38	32	24	56	36
Zac Lynch	Senior	Robert Morris	39	25	30	55	50
Kalle Kossila	Senior	St. Cloud State	41	14	40	54	14
Andrew Poturalski	Sophomore	New Hampshire	37	22	30	52	24
Greg Gibson	Senior	Robert Morris	39	29	22	51	36
Drake Caggiula	Senior	North Dakota	39	25	26	51	60
Sam Anas	Junior	Quinnipiac	43	24	26	50	18

=== Leading goaltenders ===
GP = Games played; Min = Minutes played; W = Wins; L = Losses; T = Ties; GA = Goals against; SO = Shutouts; SV% = Save percentage; GAA = Goals against average

Player	Class	Team	GP	Min	W	L	T	GA	SO	SV%	GAA
Alex Lyon	Junior	Yale	31	1905:37	19	8	4	52	5	.936	1.64
Cam Johnson	Sophomore	North Dakota	34	1918:19	24	4	2	53	5	.935	1.66
Nick Ellis	Junior	Providence	36	2195:30	25	7	4	66	4	.936	1.80
Kevin Boyle	Senior	Massachusetts–Lowell	39	2363:34	24	10	5	72	7	.934	1.83
Cole Huggins	Junior	Minnesota State	26	1501:15	13	11	2	46	3	.917	1.84
Jason Pawloski	Freshman	Minnesota State	17	972:51	8	2	5	30	1	.901	1.85
Thatcher Demko	Junior	Boston College	39	2361:48	27	8	4	74	10	.935	1.88
Michael Garteig	Senior	Quinnipiac	43	2581:24	32	4	7	82	8	.924	1.91
Chris Nell	Sophomore	Bowling Green	37	2166:38	18	11	6	69	4	.930	1.91
Kasimir Kaskisuo	Sophomore	Minnesota–Duluth	39	2349:34	19	15	5	75	5	.923	1.92
Shane Starrett	Sophomore	Air Force	33	1781:55	16	9	5	57	4	.924	1.92

== Awards ==
=== NCAA ===
Award		Recipient
Hobey Baker Award		Jimmy Vesey, Harvard
Spencer T. Penrose Award		Rand Pecknold, Quinnipiac
Tim Taylor Award		Kyle Connor, Michigan
Mike Richter Award		Thatcher Demko, Boston College
Derek Hines Unsung Hero Award		Matt Vidal, Holy Cross
Lowe's Senior CLASS Award		David Glen, Penn State
Tournament Most Outstanding Player		Drake Caggiula, North Dakota
AHCA All-American Teams
East First Team	Position	West First Team
Alex Lyon, Yale	G	Charlie Lindgren, St. Cloud State
Matt Grzelcyk, Boston University	D	Ethan Prow, St. Cloud State
Jake Walman, Providence	D	Zach Werenski, Michigan
Sam Anas, Quinnipiac	F	Brock Boeser, North Dakota
Andrew Poturalski, New Hampshire	F	Kyle Connor, Michigan
Jimmy Vesey, Harvard	F	Tyler Motte, Michigan
East Second Team	Position	West Second Team
Thatcher Demko, Boston College	G	Cam Johnson, North Dakota
Gavin Bayreuther, St. Lawrence	D	Will Butcher, Denver
Rob O'Gara, Yale	D	Troy Stecher, North Dakota
Ryan Fitzgerald, Boston College	F	Drake Caggiula, North Dakota
Mark Jankowski, Providence	F	J. T. Compher, Michigan
Danny O'Regan, Boston University	F	Alex Petan, Michigan Tech
	F	Trevor Moore, Denver

=== Atlantic Hockey ===
Award		Recipient
Player of the Year		Zac Lynch, Robert Morris
Rookie of the Year		Lester Lancaster, Mercyhurst
Best Defensive Forward		Ben Carey, Air Force
Best Defenseman		Chase Norrish, RIT
Individual Sportsmanship		Ben Carey, Air Force
Regular Season Scoring Trophy		Zac Lynch, Robert Morris
Regular Season Goaltending Award		Shane Starrett, Air Force
Team Sportsmanship Award		American International
Coach of the Year		Frank Serratore, Air Force
Most Valuable Player in Tournament		Myles Powell, RIT
All-Atlantic Hockey Teams
First Team	Position	Second Team
Shane Starrett, Air Force	G	Parker Gahagen, Army
Chase Norrish, RIT	D	Tyson Wilson, Robert Morris
Lester Lancaster, Mercyhurst	D	Johnny Hrabovsky, Air Force
Zac Lynch, Robert Morris	F	Justin Danforth, Sacred Heart
Greg Gibson, Robert Morris	F	Ralph Cuddemi, Canisius
Max French, Bentley	F	Andrew Gladiuk, Bentley
Shane Conacher, Canisius	F	
Third Team	Position	Rookie Team
Terry Shafer, Robert Morris	G	Shane Starrett, Air Force
Brady Norrish, RIT	D	Tanner Jago, Bentley
Chase Golightly, Robert Morris	D	Lester Lancaster, Mercyhurst
Josh Mitchell, RIT	F	Gabriel Valenzuela, RIT
Brandon Denham, Mercyhurst	F	Derek Barach, Mercyhurst
Brad McGowan, RIT	F	Matt Serratore, Air Force

=== Big Ten ===
Award		Recipient
Player of the Year		Kyle Connor, Michigan
Defensive Player of the Year		Zach Werenski, Michigan
Goaltender of the Year		Eric Schierhorn, Minnesota
Freshman of the Year		Kyle Connor, Michigan
Scoring Champion		Kyle Connor, Michigan
Coach of the Year		Red Berenson, Michigan
Tournament Most Outstanding Player		Kyle Connor, Michigan
All-Big Ten Teams
First Team	Position	Second Team
Eric Schierhorn, Minnesota	G	Eamon McAdam, Penn State
Zach Werenski, Michigan	D	Michael Brodzinski, Minnesota
Josh Healey, Ohio State	D	Vince Pedrie, Penn State
J. T. Compher, Michigan	F	Hudson Fasching, Minnesota
Kyle Connor, Michigan	F	Justin Kloos, Minnesota
Tyler Motte, Michigan	F	Nick Schilkey, Ohio State
Honorable Mention	Position	Freshman Team
Jake Hildebrand, Michigan State	G	Eric Schierhorn, Minnesota
Christian Frey, Ohio State	G	–
Jake Bischoff, Minnesota	D	Zach Osburn, Michigan State
–	D	Vince Pedrie, Penn State
David Goodwin, Penn State	F	Kyle Connor, Michigan
–	F	Mason Jobst, Ohio State
–	F	Luke Kunin, Wisconsin

=== ECAC ===
Award		Recipient
Player of the Year		Jimmy Vesey, Harvard
Best Defensive Forward		Carson Cooper, Yale
Best Defensive Defenseman		Rob O'Gara, Yale
Rookie of the Year		Joe Snively, Yale
Ken Dryden Award		Alex Lyon, Yale
Sportmanship Award		Yale
Student-Athlete of the Year		Kyle Criscuolo, Harvard
Tim Taylor Award		Rand Pecknold, Quinnipiac
Most Outstanding Player in Tournament		Connor Clifton, Quinnipiac
All-ECAC Hockey Teams
First Team	Position	Second Team
Alex Lyon, Yale	G	Jason Kasdorf, Rensselaer
Gavin Bayreuther, St. Lawrence	D	Eric Sweetman, St. Lawrence
Rob O'Gara, Yale	D	Devon Toews, Quinnipiac
Sam Anas, Quinnipiac	F	Kyle Criscuolo, Harvard
Nick Lappin, Brown	F	Tim Clifton, Quinnipiac
Jimmy Vesey, Harvard	F	Travis St. Denis, Quinnipiac
Third Team	Position	Rookie Team
Michael Garteig, Quinnipiac	G	Cam Hackett, Rensselaer
James de Haas, Clarkson	D	Max Gottlieb, Brown
Paul Geiger, Clarkson	D	Chase Priskie, Quinnipiac
Alexander Kerfoot, Harvard	F	Ryan Kuffner, Princeton
Tyson Spink, Colgate	F	Tommy Marchin, Brown
Mike Vecchione, Union	F	Joe Snively, Yale

=== Hockey East ===
Award		Recipient
Player of the Year		Thatcher Demko, Boston College
Player of the Year		Kevin Boyle, Massachusetts–Lowell
Best Defensive Forward		Sam Herr, Notre Dame
Best Defensive Defenseman		Steven Santini, Boston College
Rookie of the Year		Colin White, Boston College
Goaltending Champion		Kevin Boyle, Massachusetts–Lowell
Len Ceglarski Award		Joe Gambardella, Massachusetts–Lowell
Three-Stars Award		Kevin Boyle, UMass Lowell
Scoring Champion		Andrew Poturalski, New Hampshire
Charlie Holt Team Sportsmanship Award		Northeastern
Bob Kullen Coach of the Year Award		Nate Leaman, Providence
William Flynn Tournament Most Valuable Player		Kevin Boyle, Massachusetts-Lowell
All-Hockey East Teams
First Team	Position	Second Team
Thatcher Demko, Boston College	G	Kevin Boyle, Massachusetts–Lowell
Matt Grzelcyk, Boston University	D	Jordan Gross, Notre Dame
Jake Walman, Providence	D	Ian McCoshen, Boston College
Ryan Fitzgerald, Boston College	F	Zach Aston-Reese, Northeastern
Mark Jankowski, Providence	F	Anders Bjork, Notre Dame
Danny O'Regan, Boston University	F	Max Letunov, Connecticut
Andrew Poturalski, New Hampshire	F	Colin White, Boston College
Honorable Mention	Position	Rookie Team
Nick Ellis, Providence	G	
Cal Petersen, Notre Dame	G	
Dylan Zink, Massachusetts–Lowell	D	Casey Fitzgerald, Boston College
	D	Charles McAvoy, Boston University
	D	Bobby Nardella, Notre Dame
Austin Cangelosi, Boston College	F	Jakob Forsbacka Karlsson, Boston University
Thomas DiPauli, Notre Dame	F	Max Letunov, Connecticut
Tyler Kelleher, New Hampshire	F	Colin White, Boston College
Ahti Oskanen, Boston University	F	
Nolan Stevens, Northeastern	F	

=== NCHC ===
Award		Recipient
Player of the Year		Ethan Prow, St. Cloud State
Rookie of the Year		Brock Boeser, North Dakota
Goaltender of the Year		Charlie Lindgren, St. Cloud State
Forward of the Year		Danton Heinen, Denver
Defenseman of the Year		Ethan Prow, St. Cloud State
Offensive Defenseman of the Year		Ethan Prow, St. Cloud State
Defensive Forward of the Year		Sean Kuraly, Miami
Scholar-Athlete of the Year		Gabe Levin, Denver
Three Stars Award		Brock Boeser, North Dakota
Sportsmanship Award		Cal Decowski, Minnesota–Duluth
Herb Brooks Coach of the Year		Brad Berry, North Dakota
Tournament MVP		Mikey Eyssimont, St. Cloud State
All-NCHC Teams
First Team	Position	Second Team
Charlie Lindgren, St. Cloud State	G	Cam Johnson, North Dakota
Ethan Prow, St. Cloud State	D	Troy Stecher, North Dakota
Will Butcher, Denver	D	Andy Welinski, Minnesota–Duluth
Danton Heinen, Denver	F	Joey Benik, St. Cloud State
Brock Boeser, North Dakota	F	Jake Guentzel, Omaha
Drake Caggiula, North Dakota	F	Kalle Kossila, St. Cloud State
Honorable Mention	Position	Rookie Team
Kasimir Kaskisuo, Minnesota–Duluth	G	Evan Weninger, Omaha
Louie Belpedio, Miami	D	Jimmy Schuldt, St. Cloud State
Paul LaDue, North Dakota	D	Will Borgen, St. Cloud State
Nick Schmaltz, North Dakota	F	Brock Boeser, North Dakota
Trevor Moore, Denver	F	Dylan Gambrell, Denver
Sean Kuraly, Miami	F	Jack Roslovic, Miami

=== WCHA ===
Award		Recipient
Player of the Year		Alex Petan, Michigan Tech
Student-Athlete of the Year		Jamie Phillips, Michigan Tech
Defensive Player of the Year		Casey Nelson, Minnesota State
Rookie of the Year		Corey Mackin, Ferris State
Scoring Champion		Alex Petan, Michigan Tech
Goaltending Champion		Cole Huggins, Minnesota State
Coach of the Year		Mel Pearson, Michigan Tech
Most Valuable Player in Tournament		Darren Smith, Ferris State
All-WCHA Teams
First Team	Position	Second Team
Chris Nell, Bowling Green	G	Jamie Phillips, Michigan Tech
Casey Nelson, Minnesota State	D	Matt Roy, Michigan Tech
Mark Friedman, Bowling Green	D	Sean Walker, Bowling Green
Alex Petan, Michigan Tech	F	Gerald Mayhew, Ferris State
Teodors Bļugers, Minnesota State	F	Darren Nowick, Northern Michigan
Tyler Morley, Alaska	F	Dominik Shine, Northern Michigan
Third Team	Position	Rookie Team
Gordon Defiel, Lake Superior State	G	Atte Tolvanen, Northern Michigan
Brandon Anselmini, Ferris State	D	Wyatt Ege, Alaska Anchorage
Shane Hanna, Michigan Tech	D	Daniel Brickley, Minnesota State
Mark Cooper, Bowling Green	F	Corey Mackin, Ferris State
Bryce Gervais, Minnesota State	F	Max Coatta, Minnesota State
Malcolm Gould, Michigan Tech	F	Jake Lucchini, Michigan Tech
Tyler Heinonen, Michigan Tech	F	–

=== Hobey Baker Award ===
Hobey Baker Award Finalists
Player	Position	School
J. T. Compher	Forward	Michigan
Kyle Connor	Forward	Michigan
Thatcher Demko	Goaltender	Boston College
Zac Lynch	Forward	Robert Morris
Alex Lyon	Goaltender	Yale
Tyler Motte	Forward	Michigan
Alex Petan	Forward	Michigan Tech
Andrew Poturalski	Forward	New Hampshire
Ethan Prow	Defenceman	St. Cloud State
Jimmy Vesey	Forward	Harvard

=== Mike Richter Award ===
Mike Richter Award Finalists
Player	School
Kevin Boyle	UMass Lowell
Thatcher Demko	Boston College
Cam Johnson	North Dakota
Charlie Lindgren	St. Cloud State
Alex Lyon	Yale

== 2016 NHL entry draft ==
Round	Pick	Player	College	Conference	NHL team
1	7	Clayton Keller ^{†}	Boston University	Hockey East	Arizona Coyotes
1	10	Tyson Jost ^{†}	North Dakota	NCHC	Colorado Avalanche
1	14	Charlie McAvoy	Boston University	Hockey East	Boston Bruins
1	15	Luke Kunin	Wisconsin	Big Ten	Minnesota Wild
1	17	Dante Fabbro ^{†}	Boston University	Hockey East	Nashville Predators
1	19	Kieffer Bellows ^{†}	Boston University	Hockey East	New York Islanders
1	20	Dennis Cholowski ^{†}	St. Cloud State	NCHC	Detroit Red Wings
1	23	Henrik Borgström ^{†}	Denver	NCHC	Florida Panthers
1	25	Riley Tufte ^{†}	Minnesota–Duluth	NCHC	Dallas Stars
1	29	Trent Frederic ^{†}	Wisconsin	Big Ten	Boston Bruins
2	34	Andrew Peeke ^{†}	Notre Dame	Hockey East	Columbus Blue Jackets
2	40	Cam Morrison ^{†}	Notre Dame	Hockey East	Colorado Avalanche
2	45	Chad Krys ^{†}	Boston University	Hockey East	Boston Bruins
2	49	Ryan Lindgren ^{†}	Minnesota	Big Ten	Boston Bruins
2	52	Wade Allison ^{†}	Western Michigan	NCHC	Philadelphia Flyers
2	60	Dylan Gambrell	Denver	NCHC	San Jose Sharks
2	61	Kasper Björkqvist ^{†}	Providence	Hockey East	Pittsburgh Penguins
3	62	Joseph Woll ^{†}	Boston College	Hockey East	Toronto Maple Leafs
3	64	Will Lockwood ^{†}	Michigan	Big Ten	Vancouver Canucks
3	66	Adam Fox ^{†}	Harvard	ECAC Hockey	Calgary Flames
3	67	Matt Filipe ^{†}	Northeastern	Hockey East	Carolina Hurricanes
3	72	J. D. Greenway ^{†}	Wisconsin	Big Ten	Florida Panthers
3	73	Joey Anderson ^{†}	Minnesota–Duluth	NCHC	New Jersey Devils
3	75	Jack LaFontaine ^{†}	Michigan	Big Ten	Carolina Hurricanes
3	76	Rem Pitlick ^{†}	Minnesota	Big Ten	Nashville Predators
3	84	Matt Cairns ^{†}	Cornell	ECAC Hockey	Edmonton Oilers
3	86	Casey Fitzgerald	Boston College	Hockey East	Buffalo Sabres
4	99	Brett Murray ^{†}	Penn State	Big Ten	Buffalo Sabres
4	103	Todd Burgess ^{†}	Rensselaer	ECAC Hockey	Ottawa Senators
4	104	Max Zimmer ^{†}	Wisconsin	Big Ten	Carolina Hurricanes
4	106	Brandon Duhaime ^{†}	Providence	Hockey East	Minnesota Wild
4	116	Rhett Gardner	North Dakota	NCHC	Dallas Stars
4	118	Ross Colton ^{†}	Vermont	Hockey East	Tampa Bay Lightning
4	121	Ryan Jones ^{†}	Omaha	NCHC	Pittsburgh Penguins
5	124	Casey Staum ^{†}	Colorado College	NCHC	Montreal Canadiens
5	125	Nolan Stevens	Northeastern	Hockey East	St. Louis Blues
5	126	Mitchell Mattson ^{†}	Michigan State	Big Ten	Calgary Flames
5	128	Colton Point ^{†}	Colgate	ECAC Hockey	Dallas Stars
5	136	Cameron Clarke ^{†}	Ferris State	WCHA	Boston Bruins
5	138	Patrick Harper ^{†}	Boston University	Hockey East	Nashville Predators
5	142	Mikey Eyssimont	St. Cloud State	NCHC	Los Angeles Kings
5	149	Graham McPhee ^{†}	Boston College	Hockey East	Edmonton Oilers
6	153	Aapeli Räsänen ^{†}	Boston College	Hockey East	Edmonton Oilers
6	155	Peter Thome ^{†}	North Dakota	NCHC	Columbus Blue Jackets
6	161	Nate Clurman ^{†}	Notre Dame	Hockey East	Colorado Avalanche
6	169	Tanner Laczynski ^{†}	Ohio State	Big Ten	Philadelphia Flyers
6	170	Collin Adams ^{†}	North Dakota	NCHC	New York Islanders
6	173	Blake Hillman	Denver	NCHC	Chicago Blackhawks
6	174	Tyler Wall ^{†}	Massachusetts–Lowell	Hockey East	New York Rangers
6	177	Chase Priskie	Quinnipiac	ECAC Hockey	Washington Capitals
7	183	Vincent Desharnais	Providence	Hockey East	Edmonton Oilers
7	187	Arvid Henrikson ^{†}	Lake Superior State	WCHA	Montreal Canadiens
7	188	Dean Stewart ^{†}	Omaha	NCHC	Arizona Coyotes
7	192	Jérémy Davies ^{†}	Northeastern	Hockey East	New Jersey Devils
7	193	Nick Pastujov ^{†}	Michigan	Big Ten	New York Islanders
7	195	Ben Finkelstein ^{†}	St. Lawrence	ECAC Hockey	Florida Panthers
7	197	Jacob Kucharski ^{†}	Providence	Hockey East	Carolina Hurricanes
7	198	Adam Smith	Bowling Green	WCHA	Nashville Predators
7	203	Jake Ryczek ^{†}	Providence	Hockey East	Chicago Blackhawks
7	208	Ryan Lohin ^{†}	Massachusetts–Lowell	Hockey East	Tampa Bay Lightning

† incoming freshman

== See also ==
- 2015–16 NCAA Division II men's ice hockey season
- 2015–16 NCAA Division III men's ice hockey season
