= Dylan Larkin =

American ice hockey player (born 1996)

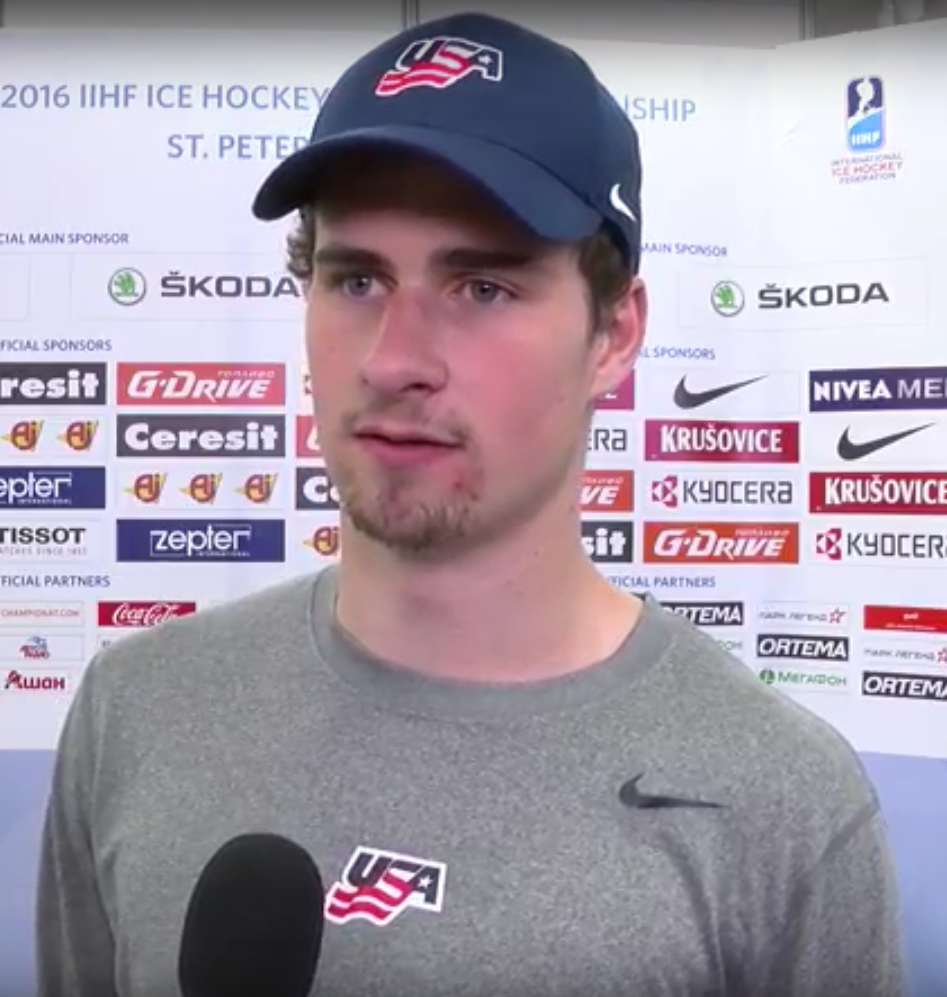
- Larkin with the United States in 2016
- Born: July 30, 1996 (age 30) Waterford, Michigan, U.S.
- Height: 6 ft 1 in (185 cm)
- Weight: 204 lb (93 kg; 14 st 8 lb)
- Position: Centre
- Shoots: Left
- NHL team: Detroit Red Wings
- National team: United States
- NHL draft: 15th overall, 2014; Detroit Red Wings
- Playing career: 2015–present

Dylan Larkin (born July 30, 1996) is an American professional ice hockey player who is a center for the Detroit Red Wings of the National Hockey League (NHL). Larkin was drafted 15th overall by the Red Wings in the 2014 NHL entry draft.

Prior to turning professional, Larkin played collegiate hockey for the University of Michigan where he was named the Freshman of the Year. He was also selected for the All-Freshman Team, All-Big Ten First Team, and Second Team All-American.

== Playing career ==
Larkin played minor ice hockey with Detroit Belle Tire, and participated in the 2009 Quebec International Pee-Wee Hockey Tournament with the team.

=== Junior ===
During the 2012–13 season, Larkin skated for USA Hockey's U17 team in his first season with the USA Hockey National Team Development Program (NTDP) in Ann Arbor. In 55 games he scored 13 goals and 14 assists. Larkin recorded one goal and one assist in four games at the 2012 Four Nations Tournament in Switzerland as the USA finished in first place. Larkin recorded three goals in four games for the third-place USA squad at the 2013 U17 Five Nations Tournament in Finland.

During the 2013–14 season, Larkin returned to skate for the NTDP's U18 team in his second season in Ann Arbor, where he finished second on the NTDP U18 team with 31 goals and fourth with 56 points in 60 games. Larkin was selected to participate in the 2013 CCM/USA Hockey All-American Prospects Game on September 26, 2013. Larkin finished the AAPG with a goal and an assist.

Larkin was ranked 17th by the NHL Central Scouting Bureau on their final list of the top draft-eligible North American skaters leading into the 2014 NHL entry draft. Larkin was selected 15th overall by Detroit Red Wings in the 2014 NHL draft.

=== College ===
Larkin began his collegiate career for the Michigan Wolverines during the 2014–15 season. Larkin was named the Hockey Commissioners' Association National Rookie of the Month for January. Larkin led all college hockey freshmen with 14 points (seven goals and seven assists) in six games, and was number two overall in the nation, second to teammate Zach Hyman, with an average of 2.33 points per game during the month of January. Larkin recorded a point in every game during the month and had an eight-game point streak (eight goals and 10 assists) overall. Larkin's overall points-per-game average (1.43 points per game) is the second-best in the last 60 years among Michigan freshmen, behind only Bruno Baseotto's 2.0 points per game in 1979–80. On January 16, 2015, Larkin recorded a career-best five-point night (two goals and three assists) in a 10–6 win at Ohio State, and became the first Michigan freshman to record five points in a game since October 18, 1997, when Mike Van Ryn had five assists in a 6–4 win against Colgate.

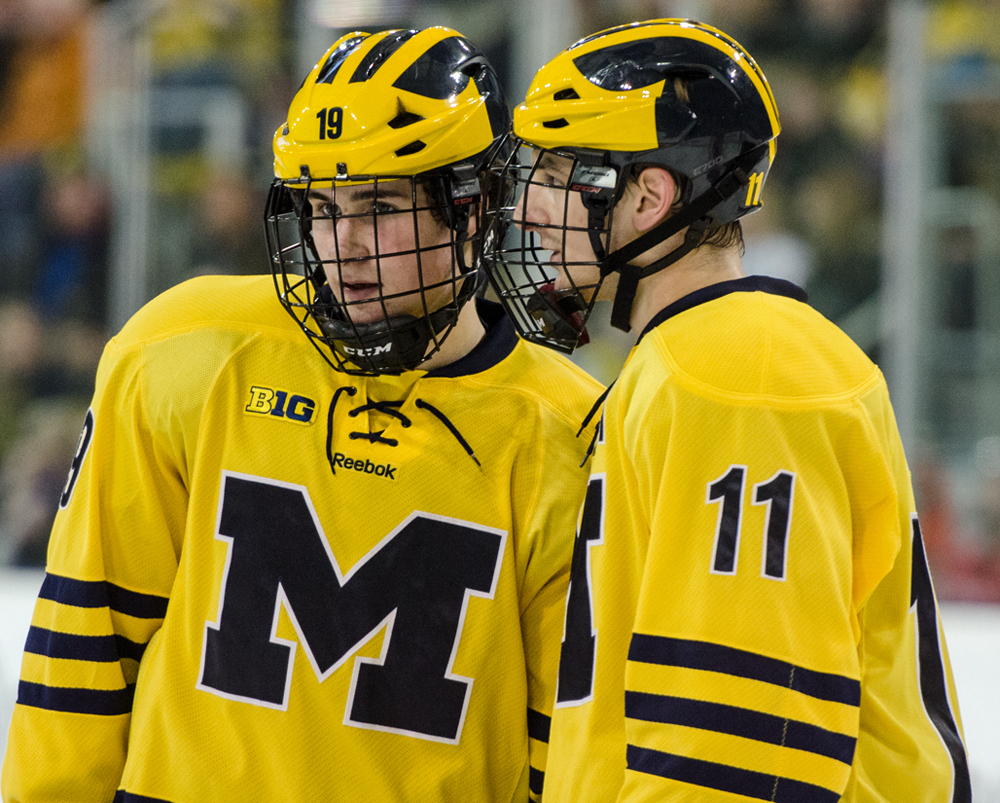
Larkin (left) and teammate Zach Hyman playing for Michigan in February 2015

On February 24, 2015, Larkin was named the Big Ten First Star of the Week. On February 20, Larkin recorded a goal and an assist and 12 shots on goal, the most shots in a game by a Michigan player since Jeff Tambellini recorded 13 shots against Quinnipiac on October 18, 2003. On February 22, Larkin recorded a goal and three assists in a 5–2 win against Ohio State. Larkin leads all Big Ten freshmen with 43 points (15 goals and 28 assists), becoming the first Michigan freshman to reach 40 points since Aaron Palushaj during the 2007–08 season. Larkin was number three in the nation in freshman scoring, number five in the nation with an average of 0.91 assists per game, and number six in the nation with a scoring average of 1.34 points per game. Larkin led all freshmen with an average of 4.41 shots a game. Following an outstanding rookie season with the Wolverines, Larkin was selected as the Big Ten's 2014–15 Freshman of the Year. He was also named to both the 2014–15 Big Ten All-Freshman Team and the All-Big Ten First Team and named an AHCA Second Team All-American.

During the quarterfinals of the 2015 Big Ten Men's Ice Hockey Tournament, Larkin recorded one goal and three assists, to break a single-game Big Ten Tournament point record. This record was surpassed the following year when J. T. Compher recorded five assists in a single game.

=== Professional ===
On May 21, 2015, it was announced that Larkin signed a three-year, entry-level contract with the Detroit Red Wings, forgoing his final three seasons of eligibility at the University of Michigan. He was assigned to the Red Wings' American Hockey League (AHL) affiliate, the Grand Rapids Griffins, after signing an amateur tryout.

Larkin made his debut for the Grand Rapids Griffins on May 24, 2015, during game one of the Western Conference finals against the Utica Comets. On May 25, in his second game with the Griffins, Larkin scored his first professional goal against Jacob Markström.

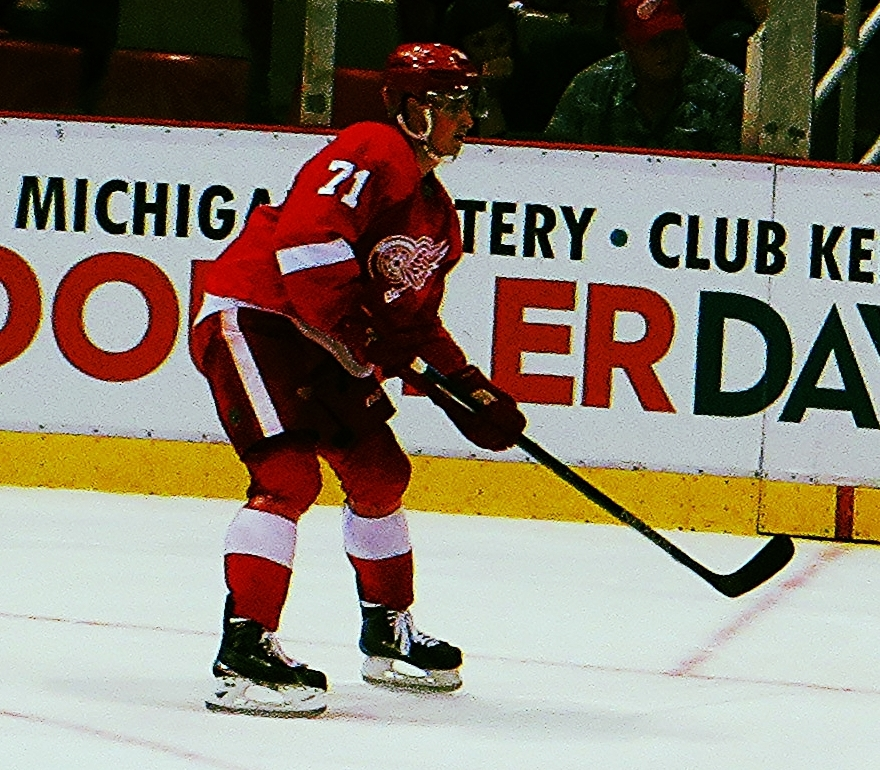
Larkin with the Red Wings during a preseason game, September 2015

On October 5, 2015, Larkin made the Red Wings' final roster for the 2015–16 season, becoming the first 19-year-old to debut on opening night since Mike Sillinger in 1990–91. In his NHL debut, on October 9, 2015, Larkin recorded his first career NHL point, an assist in the first period, and his first NHL goal in the second period against Jonathan Bernier of the Toronto Maple Leafs. He became the first Red Wings teenager to score in his first NHL game since Steve Yzerman in 1983. On November 21, Larkin scored a goal for the fourth consecutive game, becoming the first Red Wings teenager to do so since Steve Yzerman in 1984–85. Larkin was named the NHL Rookie of the Month for November 2015, leading all rookies with seven goals in 13 games in November. He also led all rookies with 10 goals, a +14 plus/minus rating, was tied for first with three game-winning goals, and ranked third with 18 points and 64 shots on goal in 24 games.

On March 24, 2016, in a game against the Montreal Canadiens, Larkin recorded his 200th shot of the season, becoming just the fifth Red Wings rookie to do so, following Marcel Dionne, Sergei Fedorov, Reed Larson and Dale McCourt.

Larkin was named to the 2016 NHL All-Star Game. Larkin was the seventh Detroit rookie to play in the All-Star Game, but only the third chosen to play. He was the first Red Wings rookie to play in the All-Star Game since Yzerman in 1984. At the NHL All-Star Game SuperSkills Competition, he set the NHL record for fastest skater, with a time of 13.172 seconds, breaking Mike Gartner's record of 13.386 that was set in 1996.

During his rookie season, Larkin recorded 23 goals and 22 assists in 80 games. Larkin became the sixth rookie in franchise history to lead the team in goals and the first since Mike Foligno led the team with 36 in the 1979–80 season. He also led the Red Wings with a +11 plus/minus rating, 221 shots on goal, and five game-winning goals. Following an outstanding rookie season, he finished among the league's rookie leaders with 23 goals (T3rd), 22 assists (11th), 45 points (6th), a plus-11 rating (T5th), five game-winning goals (T2nd), 221 shots on goal (2nd) and 16:32 average time on ice (5th among forwards). Larkin was named the 2016 Detroit Red Wings Rookie of the Year by members of the Detroit Sports Broadcasters Association.

Following his rookie season, Larkin played both winger and center. However, his sophomore year was not as prolific as his rookie season, as Larkin ended the 2016–17 season with only 17 goals and a minus-28.

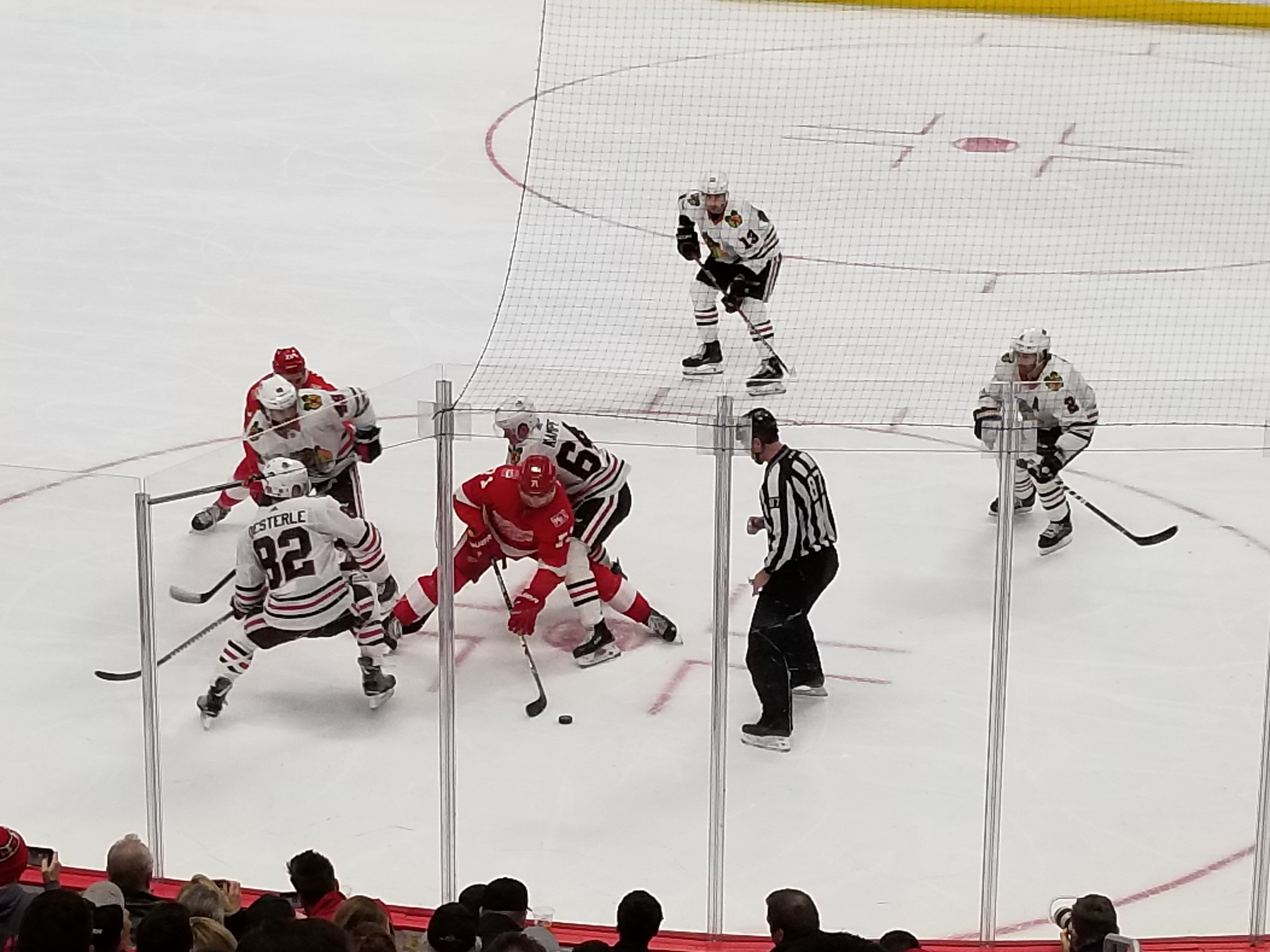
Larkin (centre foreground) with the puck in a game against the Chicago Blackhawks, January 2018

During the 2017–18 season, Larkin led the Red Wings in scoring, recording 16 goals, and 47 assists in 82 games, becoming the fifth-youngest player in franchise history to lead the team in scoring. On August 10, 2018, he signed a five-year, $30.5 million contract extension with the Red Wings.

On January 13, 2021, the Red Wings named Larkin team captain. Larkin led the NHL in scoring with five goals and seven points in three games. On December 18, 2021, he recorded his first career hat-trick. He was subsequently named the NHL First Star of the Week for the week ending December 20, 2021.

Larkin was named to the 2023 NHL All-Star Game. During the All-Star Game he helped the Atlantic Division win its first 3-on-3 title, recording five goals and one assist, a plus-seven rating, 14 shots and six takeaways in two games, including a hat trick during the championship game against the Central Division. He was subsequently named the NHL's Second Star of the Week for the week ending February 5, 2023. On March 1, 2023, the Red Wings signed Larkin to an eight-year, $69.6 million contract extension. In the first year of his contract, Larkin scored a career-high 33 goals and 36 assists through 68 games. However, after suffering an injury late in the 2023–24 season, he spent the offseason recovering from surgery.

After the 2025 trade deadline, Larkin publicly questioned Red Wings management after no major Red Wings trade occurred.

On June 4, 2026, it was reported that Larkin had requested a trade from the Red Wings. On September 11, Larkin was stripped of the captaincy by the Red Wings. On October 29, it was reported that Larkin would not play again until he was traded by the Red Wings. Later that same day, Larkin was suspended without pay. Later, a website, Larkinlosses.com, was created, which tracked the amount of salary Larkin had forfeitted in real time.

== International play ==
Medal record

Men's ice hockey

Representing the United States

Olympic Games
Gold medal – first place	2026 Milano Cortina	

World Championships
Bronze medal – third place	2015 Czech Republic	
Bronze medal – third place	2018 Denmark	

World U18 Championships
Gold medal – first place	2014 Finland	

World U-17 Hockey Challenge
Bronze medal – third place	2013 Canada	

Larkin represented the United States at the 2013 World U-17 Hockey Challenge, where he won a bronze medal. Larkin was the third-leading scorer for the United States, recording two goals and five assists in six games.

Larkin represented the United States at the 2014 IIHF World U18 Championships, where he was an alternate captain, and won a gold medal. Larkin recorded two goals and two assists in six games.

He represented the United States at the 2015 World Junior Ice Hockey Championships, where he was the team's leading scorer, and was tied for tournament lead with five goals in five games. He was named one of Team USA's top three players of the tournament.

Larkin represented the United States at the 2015 IIHF World Championship, where he recorded one assist in ten games, and won a bronze medal. He was a mainstay on the team's penalty killing unit.

Larkin represented the United States at the 2016 IIHF World Championship, where he recorded two goals and seven assists in ten games. Larkin represented Team North America at the 2016 World Cup of Hockey, where he recorded one assist in two games.

He represented the United States at the 2017 IIHF World Championship, where he was an alternate captain, and was the team's second leading scorer, recording two goals and eight assists in eight games. The following year, he represented the United States at the 2018 IIHF World Championship, where he again served as an alternate captain, recording three goals and six assists in ten games and won a bronze medal.

On April 19, 2019, Larkin returned to represent Team USA at the 2019 IIHF World Championship, held in Bratislava and Kosice, Slovakia.

On January 2, 2026, he was named to Team USA's roster for the 2026 Winter Olympics. On February 22, Larkin won the Olympic Gold medal, as the team defeated Canada 2–1 in overtime at the Milano Cortina 2026 Olympics. Amid online backlash faced by the men's Olympic hockey team regarding the inclusion of FBI director Kash Patel during their gold medal celebrations and members of the team laughing at President Trump's comments of being impeached if he did not invite the women's team to the White House, the team was invited to meet with the president and attend the State of the Union. Larkin was among the majority who visited with the president but did not attend the State of the Union Address.

== Personal life ==
Larkin has an older brother Colin, who was signed by the Edmonton Oilers to a one-year contract following the conclusion of his collegiate hockey career. His cousins Adam and Ryan also play hockey. Adam played defense for Yale University and signed with the Reading Royals of the ECHL. He also played a few games for the Adirondack Thunder. Ryan played goaltender for Miami University.

In 2016, Larkin, his brother, and cousins, began the Larkin Hockey School at Lakeland Ice Arena in Waterford Township, Michigan as a way to give back to the community.

== Career statistics ==
=== Regular season and playoffs ===
			Regular season					Playoffs
Season	Team	League	GP	G	A	Pts	PIM	GP	G	A	Pts	PIM
2012–13	U.S. NTDP Juniors	USHL	37	7	7	14	40	—	—	—	—	—
2012–13	U.S. NTDP U17	USDP	55	13	14	27	54	—	—	—	—	—
2013–14	U.S. NTDP Juniors	USHL	26	17	9	26	24	—	—	—	—	—
2013–14	U.S. NTDP U18	USDP	60	31	25	56	56	—	—	—	—	—
2014–15	University of Michigan	B1G	35	15	32	47	42	—	—	—	—	—
2014–15	Grand Rapids Griffins	AHL	—	—	—	—	—	6	3	2	5	6
2015–16	Detroit Red Wings	NHL	80	23	22	45	34	5	1	0	1	18
2016–17	Detroit Red Wings	NHL	80	17	15	32	37	—	—	—	—	—
2017–18	Detroit Red Wings	NHL	82	16	47	63	61	—	—	—	—	—
2018–19	Detroit Red Wings	NHL	76	32	41	73	75	—	—	—	—	—
2019–20	Detroit Red Wings	NHL	71	19	34	53	39	—	—	—	—	—
2020–21	Detroit Red Wings	NHL	44	9	14	23	34	—	—	—	—	—
2021–22	Detroit Red Wings	NHL	71	31	38	69	47	—	—	—	—	—
2022–23	Detroit Red Wings	NHL	80	32	47	79	45	—	—	—	—	—
2023–24	Detroit Red Wings	NHL	68	33	36	69	39	—	—	—	—	—
2024–25	Detroit Red Wings	NHL	82	30	40	70	40	—	—	—	—	—
2025–26	Detroit Red Wings	NHL	74	34	33	67	48	—	—	—	—	—
2026–27	Detroit Red Wings	NHL	10	2	4	6	4	—	—	—	—	—
NHL totals			818	278	371	649	503	5	1	0	1	18

=== International ===
Year	Team	Event	Result	GP	G	A	Pts	PIM
2013	United States	U17	3rd place, bronze medalist(s)	6	2	5	7	6
2014	United States	WJC18	1st place, gold medalist(s)	6	2	2	4	2
2015	United States	WJC	5th	5	5	2	7	4
2015	United States	WC	3rd place, bronze medalist(s)	10	0	1	1	6
2016	United States	WC	4th	10	2	7	9	8
2016	Team North America	WCH	5th	2	0	1	1	2
2017	United States	WC	5th	8	2	8	10	6
2018	United States	WC	3rd place, bronze medalist(s)	10	3	6	9	8
2019	United States	WC	7th	7	3	2	5	4
2025	United States	4NF	2nd	4	1	1	2	0
2026	United States	OG	1st place, gold medalist(s)	6	2	1	3	4
Junior totals				17	9	9	18	12
Senior totals				57	13	27	40	38

== Awards and achievements ==
Awards	Year	Ref
College
All-Big Ten Freshman Team	2015	
All-Big Ten First Team	2015	
Big Ten Freshman of the Year	2015	
AHCA West Second-Team All-American	2015	
NHL
NHL Rookie of the Month	November 2015	
NHL All-Star Game	2016, 2022, 2023	

Awards and achievements
Preceded by Anthony Mantha	Detroit Red Wings first-round draft pick 2014	Succeeded by Evgeny Svechnikov
Preceded by J. T. Compher	Big Ten Freshman of the Year; 2014–15	Succeeded by Kyle Connor
Sporting positions
Preceded by Henrik Zetterberg	Detroit Red Wings captain 2021–2026	Succeeded by TBD
