= Jack Roslovic =

American ice hockey player (born 1997)

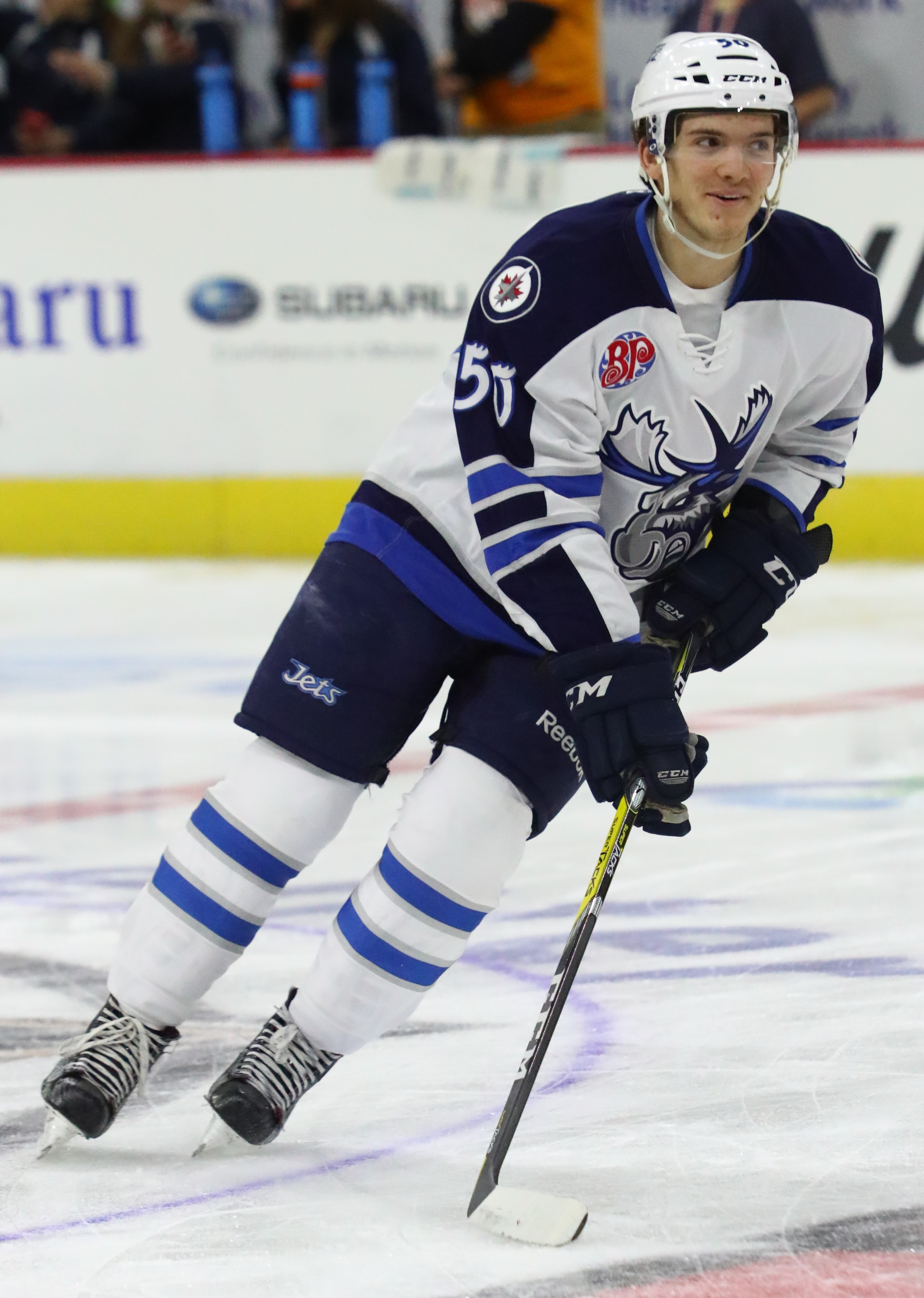
- Roslovic with the Manitoba Moose in 2017
- Born: January 29, 1997 (age 29) Columbus, Ohio, U.S.
- Height: 6 ft 1 in (185 cm)
- Weight: 198 lb (90 kg; 14 st 2 lb)
- Position: Center
- Shoots: Right
- NHL team Former teams: Toronto Maple Leafs; Winnipeg Jets; Columbus Blue Jackets; New York Rangers; Carolina Hurricanes; Edmonton Oilers
- NHL draft: 25th overall, 2015; Winnipeg Jets
- Playing career: 2016–present

John Roslovic (born January 29, 1997) is an American professional ice hockey player who is a center for the Toronto Maple Leafs of the National Hockey League (NHL). He was selected in the first round, 25th overall by the Winnipeg Jets in the 2015 NHL entry draft.

== Playing career ==
=== Amateur ===
Roslovic played minor ice hockey with the Easton Youth Hockey Association (EYHA) Ice Dragons and the Ohio AAA Blue Jackets. He participated in the 2010 Quebec International Pee-Wee Hockey Tournament with the AAA Blue Jackets. Roslovic played the 2013–14 and 2014–15 seasons in the United States Hockey League (USHL) as a member of the USA Hockey National Team Development Program (U.S. NTDP). Roslovic's outstanding play was rewarded when he was invited to skate in the 2014 CCM/USA Hockey All-American Prospects Game. He played 25 games for Team USA in the 2014–15 USHL season, accumulating 11 goals and 38 points.

Roslovic committed to play the 2015–16 season with the Miami University RedHawks. Before joining them, Roslovic was selected by the Winnipeg Jets in the first round, 25th overall, in the 2015 NHL entry draft. He skated in 36 games for the RedHawks during the 2015–16 season, recording 26 points. On July 18, 2016, the Jets signed Roslovic to a three-year, entry-level contract.

=== Professional ===
==== Winnipeg Jets ====
Roslovic joined the Jets' American Hockey League (AHL) affiliate, the Manitoba Moose, for the 2016–17 season. On April 3, 2017, the Jets recalled him. Roslovic made his NHL debut on April 6 in a 5–4 win over his hometown Columbus Blue Jackets. He was reassigned to the Moose the following day. Roslovic led the Moose in scoring for the season with 48 points in 65 games.

Roslovic once again began the 2017–18 season with the Moose. On December 30, 2017, he received a recall from the Jets. On January 25, 2018, Roslovic scored his first career NHL goal in a 4–3 loss to the Anaheim Ducks. He finished the season with five goals and 14 points in 31 games.

Roslovic began the 2018–19 season with the Jets. On February 2, 2019, he scored his first career hat trick in a 9–3 win over the Ducks, with all of his goals coming on the power play. With six points in four games, he was named the league's first star of the week ending February 4. Roslovic finished his first full season with the Jets with 24 points in 77 games.

==== Columbus Blue Jackets ====
Following the 2019–20 season, Roslovic became a restricted free agent. His agent, Claude Lemieux, confirmed he wanted to be traded. Without a new contract, Roslovic sat out the Jets' training camp as well as the beginning of the 2020–21 season.

On January 23, 2021, the Jets traded Roslovic, alongside Patrik Laine, to his hometown Columbus Blue Jackets in exchange for Pierre-Luc Dubois and 2022 third-round pick. He immediately signed a two-year, $3.8 million contract. Roslovic had a successful first season in Columbus, finishing with a career-high 34 points in just 48 games.

==== New York Rangers ====
On March 8, 2024, the Blue Jackets traded Roslovic to the New York Rangers in exchange for a conditional 2026 fourth-round pick.

==== Carolina Hurricanes ====
As a free agent at the conclusion of his contract with the Rangers, Roslovic was signed to a one-year, $2.8 million contract with the Carolina Hurricanes for the 2024–25 season on July 4, 2024.

==== Edmonton Oilers ====
Roslovic signed a one-year, $1.5 million deal with the Edmonton Oilers on October 8, 2025.

==== Toronto Maple Leafs ====
On July 1, 2026, Roslovic signed a two-year, $8 million contract with the Toronto Maple Leafs.

== International play ==
Medal record

Men's ice hockey

Representing the United States

World U18 Championship
Gold medal – first place	2015 Switzerland	

Roslovic helped lead the United States under-18 team to a gold medal at the 2014 World U-17 Hockey Challenge. He also won a gold medal as a member of the United States junior team at the 2015 World U18 Championships, where he was individually honored as one of the Top Three Players on his team.

== Career statistics ==
=== Regular season and playoffs ===
			Regular season					Playoffs
Season	Team	League	GP	G	A	Pts	PIM	GP	G	A	Pts	PIM
2012–13	Ohio Blue Jackets 16U AAA	T1EHL	40	23	30	53	22	—	—	—	—	—
2012–13	Ohio Blue Jackets 18U AAA	T1EHL	4	0	0	0	2	—	—	—	—	—
2013–14	U.S. NTDP Juniors	USHL	34	4	10	14	14	—	—	—	—	—
2013–14	U.S. NTDP U17	USDP	54	14	18	32	30	—	—	—	—	—
2014–15	U.S. NTDP Juniors	USHL	25	11	27	38	8	—	—	—	—	—
2014–15	U.S. NTDP U18	USDP	65	27	52	79	28	—	—	—	—	—
2015–16	Miami RedHawks	NCHC	36	10	16	26	18	—	—	—	—	—
2016–17	Manitoba Moose	AHL	65	13	35	48	22	—	—	—	—	—
2016–17	Winnipeg Jets	NHL	1	0	0	0	0	—	—	—	—	—
2017–18	Manitoba Moose	AHL	32	15	20	35	8	—	—	—	—	—
2017–18	Winnipeg Jets	NHL	31	5	9	14	2	10	0	3	3	2
2018–19	Winnipeg Jets	NHL	77	9	15	24	4	6	0	0	0	0
2019–20	Winnipeg Jets	NHL	71	12	17	29	12	4	0	2	2	0
2020–21	Columbus Blue Jackets	NHL	48	12	22	34	14	—	—	—	—	—
2021–22	Columbus Blue Jackets	NHL	81	22	23	45	12	—	—	—	—	—
2022–23	Columbus Blue Jackets	NHL	77	11	33	44	10	—	—	—	—	—
2023–24	Columbus Blue Jackets	NHL	40	6	17	23	14	—	—	—	—	—
2023–24	New York Rangers	NHL	19	3	5	8	2	16	2	6	8	6
2024–25	Carolina Hurricanes	NHL	81	22	17	39	10	9	1	3	4	0
2025–26	Edmonton Oilers	NHL	68	21	15	36	16	6	0	1	1	2
NHL totals			594	123	173	296	96	51	3	15	18	10

=== International ===
Year	Team	Event	Result	GP	G	A	Pts	PIM
2014	United States	U17	1st place, gold medalist(s)	6	2	4	6	14
2015	United States	U18	1st place, gold medalist(s)	7	6	5	11	4
2017	United States	WJC	1st place, gold medalist(s)	7	0	2	2	4
Junior totals				20	8	11	19	22

== Awards and honors ==
Award	Year	Ref
World U-17 Hockey Challenge gold medal	2014	
CCM/USA Hockey All-American Prospects Game	2014	
World U18 Championship gold medal	2015	

Awards and achievements
Preceded by Kyle Connor	Winnipeg Jets first-round draft pick 2015	Succeeded by Patrik Laine
