= J. T. Compher =

American ice hockey player (born 1995)

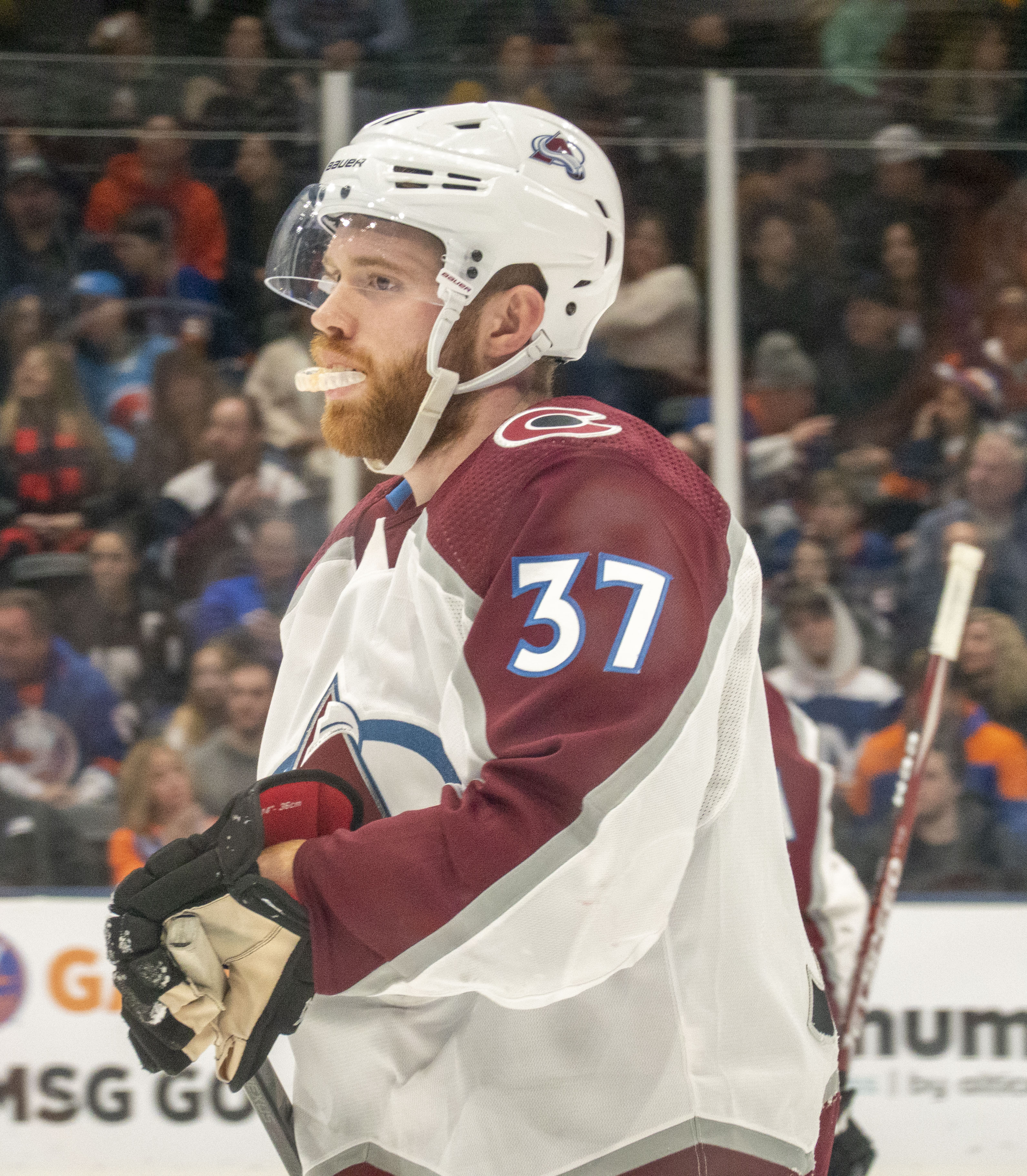
- Compher with the Colorado Avalanche in 2020
- Born: April 8, 1995 (age 31) Northbrook, Illinois, U.S.
- Height: 6 ft 0 in (183 cm)
- Weight: 192 lb (87 kg; 13 st 10 lb)
- Position: Forward
- Shoots: Right
- NHL team Former teams: Detroit Red Wings; Colorado Avalanche
- National team: United States
- NHL draft: 35th overall, 2013; Buffalo Sabres
- Playing career: 2016–present

Joseph Taylor Compher (born April 8, 1995) is an American professional ice hockey player who is a forward for the Detroit Red Wings of the National Hockey League (NHL). He was selected in the second round, 35th overall, by the Buffalo Sabres in the 2013 NHL entry draft. Compher won the Stanley Cup with the Colorado Avalanche in 2022.

Born and raised in Northbrook, Illinois, Compher was introduced to ice hockey by a preschool friend and played for a number of teams in the area before joining the USA Hockey National Team Development Program in 2011. He played for two seasons with the program, with appearances in two IIHF World U18 Championships. From there, he played three seasons of college ice hockey for the Michigan Wolverines. As a freshman during the 2013–14 season, Compher led all Big Ten Conference freshmen in scoring with 31 points, and he was named the inaugural Big Ten Men's Ice Hockey Freshman of the Year. Two years later, he served both as the Wolverines' captain and as a member of the high-scoring "CCM Line". Made up of Compher, Kyle Connor, and Tyler Motte, the CCM Line combined for 83 goals and 107 assists during the 2015–16 season and helped Michigan to capture their first Big Ten Men's Ice Hockey Tournament.

While he was attending college, the Sabres included Compher in a trade package with the Colorado Avalanche, the team he joined after completing his career with Michigan. Compher spent the first part of the season with the San Antonio Rampage, the Avalanche's American Hockey League (AHL) affiliate, but finished the 2016–17 season in the NHL as a replacement for the traded Jarome Iginla. After finding success in his first full NHL season during 2017–18, Compher hoped to become Colorado's second-line center in 2018–19, a plan that was delayed when he was sidelined with a concussion. Compher posted consecutive 30-point seasons during the 2018–19 and 2019–20 seasons despite losing time to injury and the COVID-19 pandemic.

== Early life ==
Compher was born on April 8, 1995, in Northbrook, Illinois, to Bob and Valerie Compher. He lived in Deerfield, Illinois, until about the age of five, at which point his family moved to Northbrook, another suburb of Chicago. After the move, Compher met a classmate in preschool who invited him to go ice skating, and he began playing ice hockey shortly afterwards. As a child, Compher would practice firing slapshots at his younger sister Jesse, who wanted to be a goaltender. His other younger sister Morgan would participate in pickup ice hockey games as well, as would many of their neighbors. He played for a number of youth hockey teams in the Chicago area, including the Northbrook Bluehawks and Team Illinois, and attended Glenbrook North High School. He was invited to join the USA Hockey National Team Development Program for their 2011–12 season. In two seasons with the program, Compher recorded 33 goals and 92 points in 92 games.

== Playing career ==
=== College ===
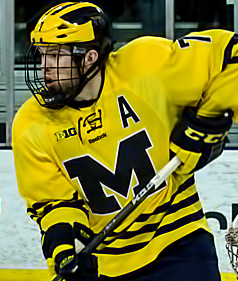
Compher with the Michigan Wolverines in 2015

The Buffalo Sabres of the National Hockey League (NHL) selected Compher in the second round with the 35th overall pick of the 2013 NHL entry draft. The Sabres acquired the pick that they used on Compher by trading Andrej Sekera to the Carolina Hurricanes. At the time, Compher had committed to play college ice hockey for the Michigan Wolverines of the Big Ten Conference. He joined the Wolverines for the 2013–14 season, scoring his first collegiate goal on November 15, 2013, in a 3–2 loss to the Omaha Mavericks. In a rematch against Omaha the next day, Compher scored Michigan's first short-handed goal of the season in a game that the Wolverines won 4–3. On December 3, Compher was named the Big Ten Second Star of the Week after recording three goals and an assist in a two-game series against the Ohio State Buckeyes. With two goals and two assists on January 24, Compher gave Michigan their first win against the Michigan State Spartans at the Munn Ice Arena since 2010. It was the first four-point game for a Michigan freshman since Andrew Cogliano in 2005 and the first time that any Michigan player had recorded a four-point game since David Wohlberg in 2011. He was named the Big Ten First Star of the Week for his performance, after which he led all Big Ten freshmen with 1.00 points per game. He finished the season leading both the Wolverines and all Big Ten freshmen with 31 points (11 goals and 20 assists) and took home three team awards at Michigan's end-of-year banquet: the Deker Club Award for Rookie of the Year, the Hazel "Doc" Losh Award for leading scorer, and the Hal Downes Award for the Wolverines' most valuable player. In addition to being named to the All-Big Ten Second Team and Big Ten All-Freshman First Team, Compher finished the college awards season as the inaugural Big Ten Men's Ice Hockey Freshman of the Year. Michigan was eliminated in the first round of the 2014 Big Ten Men's Ice Hockey Tournament in a double-overtime 2–1 Penn State victory.

Going into the 2014–15 season, Compher was named an alternate captain for the Wolverines alongside Zach Hyman, with Andrew Copp serving as captain. His first collegiate hat-trick came on February 28, 2015, when Compher scored two goals against Wisconsin Badgers goaltender Joel Rumpel before finishing the game with an empty net goal to seal the 5–2 victory for Michigan. Compher's second hat-trick came on March 8, when he scored every goal for the Wolverines in their 4–3 loss to Penn State. He finished the regular season with 12 goals and 24 points in 34 games, including eight goals and two assists in his last eight games. After defeating Wisconsin 5–1 in the opening round of the 2015 Big Ten Men's Ice Hockey Tournament, the Wolverines won 4–1 against Michigan State in the semifinals, with Compher scoring what was ultimately the game-winning goal in the second period. Michigan lost to the Minnesota Golden Gophers 4–2 in the Big Ten tournament finals. That June, the Sabres traded Compher's prospect rights to the Colorado Avalanche as part of a larger package that sent Jamie McGinn and Ryan O'Reilly to Buffalo in exchange for Compher, Nikita Zadorov, Mikhail Grigorenko, and a second-round pick in the 2015 NHL entry draft.

Prior to the 2015–16 season, the Wolverines elected Compher their captain, with Boo Nieves and Justin Selman as his alternates. He spent the season playing on a high-scoring offensive line with fellow NHL prospects Kyle Connor and Tyler Motte, which was nicknamed the "CCM Line" for their initials. The line was assembled on December 4, 11 games into the Wolverines' season, and after being placed together, Compher and Connor both tallied at least one point in 16 consecutive games. On January 8, Compher recorded a five-point game (two goals and three assists) in a 9–2 win over Michigan State, the largest margin of victory for Michigan against their state rivals since 1996. With two assists in a 5–2 win over Ferris State on February 19, Compher recorded his 100th collegiate point with the Wolverines. Through 38 regular season games with Michigan, Compher had 16 goals and 63 points. He finished second among all Big Ten players in scoring, one behind teammate Connor, and was first with 47 assists, 1.24 assists per game, 24 power play points, and a +35 plus-minus. Combined, the CCM line recorded 83 goals and 107 assists during the season. In the semifinal round of the 2016 Big Ten Men's Ice Hockey Tournament, Compher set a career-high five assists in Michigan's 7–2 win over Penn State, becoming the first Michigan player to have a five-assist game since Chad Kolarik in 2008. Michigan won its first ever Big Ten ice hockey championship with their 5–3 victory over Minnesota. Compher was named to the Big Ten All-Tournament Team, while the Wolverines automatically earned a bid into the 2016 NCAA Division I Men's Ice Hockey Tournament. They faced Notre Dame in the first round of the NCAA tournament, with Compher assisting on the game-winning overtime goal from Tyler Motte. They were eliminated from the tournament in the next round with a 5–2 loss to North Dakota. At the time of their elimination, Compher had an eight-game point streak with five goals and 11 assists. He was a top-10 Hobey Baker Award finalist and was named to both the All-Big Ten First Team and American Hockey Coaches Association All-American Second Team at the end of the season. Compher's collegiate hockey career ended in 2016, at which point he chose to forego his final year of NCAA eligibility to sign a three-year entry-level contract with the Avalanche.

=== Professional ===
==== Colorado Avalanche (2016–2023) ====
After attending the Avalanche's 2016 training camp, Compher was assigned to the San Antonio Rampage of the American Hockey League (AHL) to begin the 2016–17 season. He spent his time in San Antonio working on becoming a two-way player while leading the team in scoring with 13 goals and 30 points in 41 games. After Jarome Iginla was traded to the Los Angeles Kings on March 1, 2017, Compher was called up to the Avalanche as his replacement, part of general manager Joe Sakic's plan to give the team a younger core. Compher made his NHL debut on March 2, centering the third line with Matt Nieto and Blake Comeau on the wings. Compher scored his first NHL goal two weeks later to put the Avalanche up 2–1 in what was ultimately a 3–1 victory over the Detroit Red Wings on March 15. His first assist came on April 2, when Compher helped Gabriel Landeskog score against the Minnesota Wild. He played 21 games during his rookie season with the Avalanche, recording three goals and five points in the process while leading the team with a +1 rating.

Compher was one of three rookie forwards to make the Avalanche's opening night roster for the 2017–18 season, joining Tyson Jost and Alexander Kerfoot. On October 19, in the eighth game of the season, Compher fractured his thumb while blocking a shot during Colorado's game against the St. Louis Blues. At the time of the injury, he had one goal and four points. He missed six games before returning on November 5 but was injured again on December 29. Compher sustained an upper body injury while playing against the Toronto Maple Leafs and stayed in the game to score an overtime goal for the Avalanche, but he did not play two days later against the New York Islanders. One of several young players to be injured around the midway point of the season, Compher returned on January 17 for a game against the San Jose Sharks. Compher's first NHL multi-goal game on March 14 moved the Avalanche up from the second to the first wild card position in the Western Conference, giving them a stronger opportunity to reach the postseason. He finished his first full season with 13 goals and 23 points in 69 games and was the first Avalanche rookie in franchise history to score two overtime game-winning goals in a season. The Avalanche, meanwhile, clinched a berth in the 2018 Stanley Cup playoffs, allowing Compher to make his NHL postseason debut in their first-round series against the Nashville Predators. He appeared in all six playoff games before the Predators eliminated the Avalanche, assisting on three goals in the process.

Five games into the 2018–19 season, Compher sustained a concussion during the Avalanche's game against the Calgary Flames. At the time, he had hoped to become Colorado's second-line center, and he found both the timing of the injury and the unclear recovery timeline a frustrating setback in that push. He missed six weeks with the injury, returning on November 23 to score two short-handed goals in a 5–1 victory over the Arizona Coyotes. While playing his hometown Chicago Blackhawks on February 22, Compher recorded his first professional three-point game, registering two goals and an assist, including the game-winning goal, in Colorado's 5–3 win. His second goal of the game was also his 14th of the season, surpassing his previous season total. He finished the season with 16 goals and 32 points, including three short-handed goals, while the Avalanche faced the Flames in the first round of 2019 Stanley Cup playoffs. While facing elimination in Game 6 of their second-round series against the San Jose Sharks, Compher scored two goals and an assist in a game that the Avalanche won in overtime to force a winner-take-all Game 7. Colorado was eliminated in the next game, losing 3–2 to the Sharks, and Compher finished the playoffs with four goals and six points in 12 games.

On July 17, 2019, Compher, at the time a restricted free agent, signed a four-year, $14 million ($3.5 million average annual value) contract extension with the Avalanche. He was once again injured early in the season, missing three games in October after sustaining a lower-body injury during a game against the Minnesota Wild. He spent most of the season playing on the third offensive line, but injuries to top-six forwards like Mikko Rantanen and Nazem Kadri throughout the season gave Compher opportunities to fill in for them on the higher lines. At the time that the COVID-19 pandemic forced the indefinite suspension of the 2019–20 NHL season in March, Compher was ninth for the Avalanche with 31 points, including 11 goals, in 67 games. When the NHL returned to play in July for the 2020 Stanley Cup playoffs, Compher was one of 31 skaters invited to play for Colorado in the quarantine bubble. For the second year in a row, the Avalanche were eliminated in Game 7 of the second round of playoffs, this time falling to the Dallas Stars. Playing predominantly on the third line with Andre Burakovsky and Joonas Donskoi, Compher recorded eight goals in 15 postseason games.

With a number of key Avalanche players injured towards the beginning of the 2020–21 season, Compher had an opportunity to fill in for Nathan MacKinnon, centering Gabriel Landeskog and Mikko Rantanen on the top line. Shortly after breaking a six-game scoring drought on February 24, Compher was injured himself. He missed seven games, returning on March 20 as a replacement for Logan O'Connor on the fourth line for a 6–0 shutout victory over the Minnesota Wild. After another scoring drought during which he had two goals in 19 games throughout April and the first half of May, Compher recorded his first NHL hat-trick on May 12 during a 6–0 shutout win over the Los Angeles Kings. The 2020–21 season proved an offensive step back for Compher, who recorded only 10 goals and 18 points in 48 games of the pandemic-shortened season. For the third year in a row, the Avalanche were eliminated in the second round of Stanley Cup playoffs, falling to the Vegas Golden Knights in six games. That July, the Avalanche exposed Compher in the 2021 NHL expansion draft, but the Seattle Kraken selected his teammate Donskoi instead.

As Colorado entered the 2021–22 season, head coach Jared Bednar told reporters that he was "looking for [Compher] to have a bounce back season". On November 13, Compher sustained an upper-body injury during a game against the San Jose Sharks and was expected to miss about a month of the season. In his absence, Nicolas Aubé-Kubel, who had recently been claimed from the Philadelphia Flyers on waivers, filled in for him as the right winger for Tyson Jost and Alex Newhook's line. He returned on December 10 after missing 11 games, opening the scoring in a 7–3 victory over the Detroit Red Wings in his first game since the injury. In the second half of the season, the Avalanche earned praise from sportswriters for their offensive depth, with Compher one of several players who, despite being on the lower offensive lines, was able to generate goals. At the end of the regular season, Compher set career highs with 18 goals and 33 points in 70 games. In the 2022 Stanley Cup playoffs, Compher played a key role in the Avalanche's first second round series victory, scoring two goals in Game 6 to help clinch the win over the St. Louis Blues. In the Western Conference Finals against the Edmonton Oilers, Compher continued to distinguish himself, notably scoring the game-winning goal in Game 3 to give the Avalanche a stranglehold on the series. They swept the Oilers, advancing to the 2022 Stanley Cup Final. There, the Avalanche defeated the Tampa Bay Lightning in six games to become Stanley Cup champions. Overall, Compher contributed five goals and eight points in 20 postseason games.

==== Detroit Red Wings (2023–present) ====
On July 1, 2023, Compher signed a five-year, $25.5 million contract with the Detroit Red Wings.

== International play ==
Medal record

Representing United States

Ice hockey

World U-17 Hockey Challenge
| Silver medal – second place | 2012 Canada | |

World U18 Championships
| Gold medal – first place | 2012 Czech Republic | |
| Silver medal – second place | 2013 Russia | |

Compher first represented the United States in international competition at the 2012 World U-17 Hockey Challenge. He had a team-leading four goals and seven assists in six games, including a goal in Team USA's gold-medal loss to Russia, and was named to the Tournament All-Star Team. That same year, Compher won a gold medal with Team USA at the 2012 IIHF World U18 Championships, recording two goals and five points in six games. He returned the following year as captain for Team USA at the 2013 IIHF World U18 Championships. Compher registered three goals and seven points in seven games, while the United States won the silver medal, falling 3–2 to Canada in the championship.

Compher was meant to play for the United States junior team at the 2014 World Junior Ice Hockey Championships, but he sustained a foot injury during practice and was cut from the team. The following year, he was one of several Wolverines to attend the 2015 World Junior Ice Hockey Championships, where he was held pointless in five games for the fifth-place United States team.

All three members of Compher's "CCM Line" at Michigan were selected to represent the United States senior team at the 2016 IIHF World Championship in Russia. He recorded one goal and three points in 10 games, while the United States finished in fourth place, losing to Russia in the bronze-medal game. He returned the following year as one of nine Avalanche players to participate in the 2017 IIHF World Championship in Germany and France. There, he recorded two goals in eight contests.

== Personal life ==
When deciding on his name, Compher's parents first decided on the initials "J. T." before filling them out with his first and middle name, "Joseph Taylor". His younger sister, Jesse, is also a professional ice hockey player for the Detroit Clutch and is a member of the United States women's national ice hockey team, with whom she won a silver medal at the 2022 Winter Olympics. She played college ice hockey for the Boston University Terriers and the Wisconsin Badgers.

== Career statistics ==
=== Regular season and playoffs ===
| | | | Regular season | | | | | Playoffs |
| Season | Team | League | GP | G | A | Pts | PIM | GP | G | A | Pts | PIM |
|---|---|---|---|---|---|---|---|---|---|---|---|---|
| 2011–12 | U.S. NTDP Juniors | USHL | 32 | 13 | 14 | 27 | 37 | — | — | — | — | — |
| 2011–12 | U.S. NTDP U17 | USDP | 40 | 15 | 27 | 42 | 53 | — | — | — | — | — |
| 2011–12 | U.S. NTDP U18 | USDP | 18 | 8 | 5 | 13 | 4 | — | — | — | — | — |
| 2012–13 | U.S. NTDP Juniors | USHL | 21 | 7 | 17 | 24 | 23 | — | — | — | — | — |
| 2012–13 | U.S. NTDP U18 | USDP | 52 | 18 | 32 | 50 | 51 | — | — | — | — | — |
| 2013–14 | University of Michigan | B1G | 35 | 11 | 20 | 31 | 24 | — | — | — | — | — |
| 2014–15 | University of Michigan | B1G | 34 | 12 | 12 | 24 | 44 | — | — | — | — | — |
| 2015–16 | University of Michigan | B1G | 37 | 16 | 47 | 63 | 30 | — | — | — | — | — |
| 2016–17 | San Antonio Rampage | AHL | 41 | 13 | 17 | 30 | 22 | — | — | — | — | — |
| 2016–17 | Colorado Avalanche | NHL | 21 | 3 | 3 | 6 | 4 | — | — | — | — | — |
| 2017–18 | Colorado Avalanche | NHL | 69 | 13 | 10 | 23 | 20 | 6 | 0 | 3 | 3 | 2 |
| 2018–19 | Colorado Avalanche | NHL | 66 | 16 | 16 | 32 | 31 | 12 | 4 | 2 | 6 | 0 |
| 2019–20 | Colorado Avalanche | NHL | 67 | 11 | 20 | 31 | 18 | 15 | 3 | 5 | 8 | 4 |
| 2020–21 | Colorado Avalanche | NHL | 48 | 10 | 8 | 18 | 19 | 10 | 1 | 1 | 2 | 4 |
| 2021–22 | Colorado Avalanche | NHL | 70 | 18 | 15 | 33 | 25 | 20 | 5 | 3 | 8 | 10 |
| 2022–23 | Colorado Avalanche | NHL | 82 | 17 | 35 | 52 | 33 | 7 | 1 | 1 | 2 | 0 |
| 2023–24 | Detroit Red Wings | NHL | 77 | 19 | 29 | 48 | 34 | — | — | — | — | — |
| 2024–25 | Detroit Red Wings | NHL | 76 | 11 | 21 | 32 | 24 | — | — | — | — | — |
| 2025–26 | Detroit Red Wings | NHL | 82 | 11 | 17 | 28 | 27 | — | — | — | — | — |
| NHL totals | | | 658 | 129 | 173 | 302 | 235 | 70 | 14 | 15 | 29 | 20 |

=== International ===
| Year | Team | Event | Result | GP | G | A | Pts | PIM |
|---|---|---|---|---|---|---|---|---|
| 2012 | United States | U17 | 2nd place, silver medalist(s) | 6 | 4 | 7 | 11 | 14 |
| 2012 | United States | U18 | 1st place, gold medalist(s) | 6 | 2 | 3 | 5 | 4 |
| 2013 | United States | U18 | 2nd place, silver medalist(s) | 7 | 3 | 4 | 7 | 8 |
| 2015 | United States | WJC | 5th | 5 | 0 | 0 | 0 | 0 |
| 2016 | United States | WC | 4th | 10 | 1 | 2 | 3 | 2 |
| 2017 | United States | WC | 5th | 8 | 2 | 0 | 2 | 0 |
| Junior totals | | | | 23 | 9 | 14 | 23 | 26 |
| Senior totals | | | | 18 | 3 | 2 | 5 | 2 |

== Awards and honors ==
| Award | Year | Ref. |
College
| Big Ten All-Freshman First Team | 2014 | |
| All-Big Ten Second Team | 2014 | |
| Big Ten Men's Ice Hockey Freshman of the Year | 2014 | |
| All-Big Ten First Team | 2016 | |
| AHCA West Second-Team All-American | 2016 | |
| Big Ten All-Tournament Team | 2016 | |
NHL
| Stanley Cup champion | 2022 | |

Awards and achievements
| Preceded by Award Created | Big Ten Freshman of the Year; 2013–14 | Succeeded by Dylan Larkin |
