= Big Ten Men's Ice Hockey Freshman of the Year =

Big Ten Freshman of the Year
- Sport: Ice hockey
- Awarded for: The Freshman of the Year in the Big Ten

History
- First award: 2014
- Most recent: Gavin McKenna

The Big Ten Freshman of the Year is an annual award given out at the conclusion of the Big Ten regular season to the best freshman in the conference as voted by a media panel and the head coaches of each team.

The Freshman of the Year was first awarded in 2014 and is a successor to the CCHA Rookie of the Year which was discontinued after the conference dissolved due to the 2013–14 NCAA conference realignment.

== Award winners ==
Year	Winner	Position	School
2013–14	J. T. Compher	Left wing	Michigan
2014–15	Dylan Larkin	Center	Michigan
2015–16	Kyle Connor	Left wing	Michigan
2016–17	Trent Frederic	Center	Wisconsin
2017–18	Mitchell Lewandowski	Forward	Michigan State
2018–19	Sammy Walker	Forward	Minnesota
2019–20	Cole Caufield	Forward	Wisconsin
2020–21	Thomas Bordeleau	Forward	Michigan
2021–22	Jakub Dobeš	Goaltender	Ohio State
2021–22	Luke Hughes	Defenseman	Michigan
2022–23	Adam Fantilli	Forward	Michigan
2023–24	Artyom Levshunov	Defenceman	Michigan State
2024–25	Michael Hage	Forward	Michigan
2025–26	Gavin McKenna	Left wing	Penn State

=== Winners by school ===
School	Winners
Michigan	7
Michigan State	2
Wisconsin	2
Minnesota	1
Ohio State	1
Penn State	1

=== Winners by position ===
Position	Winners
Center	2
Right wing	0
Left wing	3
Forward	5
Defenceman	2
Goaltender	1
