= Kyle Connor =

American ice hockey player (born 1996)

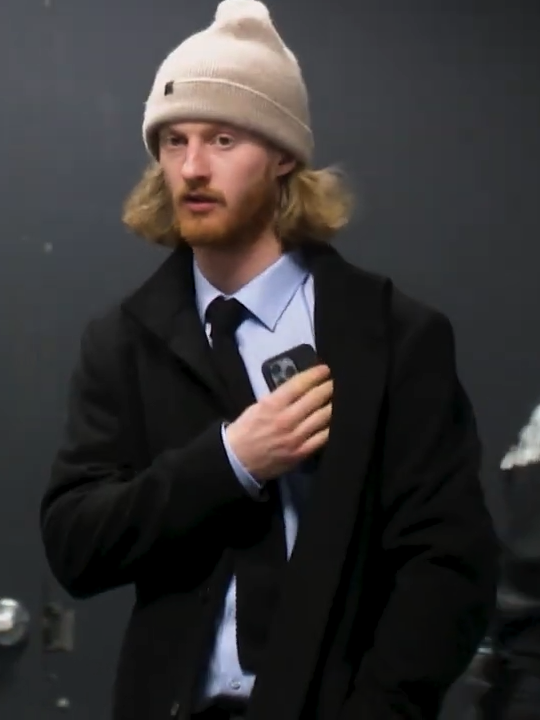
- Connor in 2022
- Born: December 9, 1996 (age 29) Clinton Township, Michigan, U.S.
- Height: 6 ft 1 in (185 cm)
- Weight: 183 lb (83 kg; 13 st 1 lb)
- Position: Left wing
- Shoots: Left
- NHL team: Winnipeg Jets
- National team: United States
- NHL draft: 17th overall, 2015; Winnipeg Jets
- Playing career: 2016–present

Kyle David Connor (born December 9, 1996) is an American professional ice hockey player for the Winnipeg Jets of the National Hockey League (NHL). Connor was drafted 17th overall by the Jets in the 2015 NHL entry draft.

== Early life ==
Connor was born on December 9, 1996, in Clinton Township, Michigan, to parents Joe and Kathy. While growing up alongside three other siblings, Connor began playing youth hockey in the Belle Tire organization in Metro Detroit. He also played basketball, baseball, and football through junior high and high school.

== Playing career ==
Connor played minor ice hockey for Detroit Belle Tire and participated in the 2009 Quebec International Pee-Wee Hockey Tournament with them.

=== Junior ===
Connor joined the Youngstown Phantoms of the USHL during the 2012–13 season. During the 2013–14 season, Connor recorded 31 goals and 43 assists, in 56 games, setting a Phantoms franchise record for most points in a season with 74 points. His outstanding play was recognized when he was named to the 2013–14 USHL First All-Star Team.

During the 2014–15 season, Connor led the league in scoring, recording 34 goals and 46 assists, in 56 regular season games. He broke the Phantoms' franchise record for points in a season, with 80 points. He led the USHL with nine game-winning goals. Following an outstanding season, he was named to the 2014–15 USHL First All-Star Team and was also named the USHL Forward of the Year and Player of the Year.

=== College ===
He committed to play for the Michigan Wolverines for the 2015–16 season. Connor was named the Big Ten First Star of the Week for the week ending October 20, 2015. In the season opener on October 16, Connor recorded two goals and an assist in his debut, the most points by a Michigan freshman in his debut since Jason Ryznar had three points (one goal and two assists) in his debut in the Cold War at Spartan Stadium on October 6, 2001. On October 18, he scored the game-winning goal against Mercyhurst. Connor was named the Big Ten First Star of the Week for the week ending December 15, 2015. He recorded five goals and one assist in a split weekend series against Minnesota. On December 11, Connor recorded his first career hat-trick, becoming the first Michigan freshman to record a hat-trick in a game since Michael Woodford in 2001. Connor was named to the GLI-all-tournament team, and was named MVP at the 2015 Great Lakes Invitational. Connor was named the Hockey Commissioners' Association (HCA) National Rookie of the Month for December 2015. Connor led the nation with seven goals and 13 points in six games during the month of December, averaging 2.17 points per game in that span. He registered at least one point in all six games, including four multi-point efforts. His overall average of 1.47 points per game this season is the most by a Michigan freshman since the 1979–80 season.

Connor was named the Big Ten Second Star of the Week for the week ending January 12, 2016. During that time he recorded three goals and three assists, including a career-best five points on January 8, against Michigan State. Connor was named the Big Ten Second Star of the Week for the week ending February 2, 2016. During that time he recorded two goals and four assists in two games against Penn State. On January 28, Connor matched a career-high with five points, including the game-winning goal. By reaching 20 goals in 22 games, he and teammate Tyler Motte were the fastest Michigan players to reach 20 goals since Kevin Porter had 20 goals in 21 games during the 2007–08 season. Connor became the first Michigan freshman to score 20 goals since Jeff Tambellini scored 26 goals during the 2002–03 season. Connor was named the HCA National Rookie of the Month for the month of January. He ranked second nationally with 1.33 goals, 1.50 assists, and 2.83 points per game last month, trailing only linemates Motte in goals and points and J. T. Compher in assists. Connor was named the Big Ten First Star of the Week for the week ending February 23, 2016. He joined Tyler Motte as the only player in the Big Ten to earn First Star of the Week honors three times this season. Connor is the fifth Michigan freshman ever to reach the 50-point mark, and the first since current assistant coach Brian Wiseman reached the mark in 1990–91.

Connor was named the Big Ten Second Star of the Week for the week ending March 1, 2016. Connor is in the midst of a 23-game point streak, the longest by a Michigan player since Mike Knuble had points in 21 straight games during the 1994–95 season. He is the first Michigan player to reach 60 points since Kevin Porter recorded 63 points in 2007–08, and the first Michigan freshman to reach the 30-goal mark since Danny Felsner had 30 goals in 1988–89. Connor is also the first freshman in college hockey to record 30 goals since Thomas Vanek in 2002–03. Connor was named the Big Ten First Star of the Week for the week ending March 15. Connor extended his Red Berenson-era (since 1984) Michigan record point streak to 23 games with four goals in two wins against Penn State.

Following an outstanding freshman season with the Wolverines, Connor was named the Big Ten Conference ice hockey Player of the Year and Freshman of the Year. He was also named to both the Big Ten All-Freshman Team and the All-Big Ten First Team. He was also Big Ten Scoring Champion, recording 30 goals, and 31 assists in 34 games. He was also named the NCAA Ice Hockey National Rookie of the Year and an AHCA First Team All-American. Connor was runner-up for the Hobey Baker Award, losing to Jimmy Vesey. During the quarterfinals of the 2016 Big Ten men's ice hockey tournament, Connor scored four goals, breaking the record for most goals in a single Big Ten Tournament game. Connor became the first Michigan player to score four goals in a game since Kevin Porter on March 28, 2008. During the championship game, Connor and teammate Zach Werenski tied the record for most assists in the Big Ten tournament championship game with three assists. Connor and Werenski also tied the record for most points in a championship game with four points. Connor holds the record for most goals in a single Big Ten tournament with five goals, while Connor and teammate J. T. Compher are tied for the most points in a single Big Ten tournament with eight points. He was named the Big Ten Tournament Most Outstanding Player and named to the Big Ten All-Tournament Team. He was also a finalist for the Hobey Baker Award.

=== Professional ===
==== Early years in the Jets organization (2016–2019) ====
On April 11, 2016, Connor left the University of Michigan and signed a three-year, two-way contract with the Winnipeg Jets worth an average annual value of $1.775 million. He made his NHL debut on October 13, playing alongside Mathieu Perreault and fellow rookie Patrik Laine. He recorded his first career NHL point that night with an assist on Laine's third-period goal. However, after Laine suffered an injury in the season opener, Connor and Perreault gained Drew Stafford as their second line right winger. Once Laine returned, Connor was shifted down to the fourth line with Alexander Burmistrov and Brandon Tanev. He recorded his first career NHL goal on October 27, 2016, in a 4–1 win over the Dallas Stars. This would prove to be his last goal before suffering a head injury during a game against the Los Angeles Kings on November 13. Connor was subsequently placed on injured reserve and the Jets called up Chase De Leo from their American Hockey League affiliate, the Manitoba Moose. After missing five games to recover, Connor returned to the Jets' lineup on November 25. His return was shortlived however as he was re-assigned to the Moose on December 9 after continuing to go pointless.

Connor made an immediate impact upon joining the Moose as he tallied his first AHL assist on Jack Roslovic's third period-goal in his AHL debut. The following game, Connor recorded his first AHL goal as the Moose fell 2–1 to the Cleveland Monsters. Although he had an uptick in scoring, Connor did not have regular linemates as he moved up and down the lineup. During the month of February, Connor tallied 2.57 shots per game and earned 13 points, including three multi-goal games. This continued into March and he was recognized as the CCM/AHL Player of the Week after posting eight points over four games. Throughout late February to April, Connor recorded 15 goals and nine assists for 24 points over 17 games. His efforts were recognised by the Jets and he earned his first call-up since being assigned to the Moose on April 3. Upon being recalled, Connor scored the game-tying goal in the Jets' final game of the regular season to lift the team 2–1 over the Nashville Predators. By winning the game, the Jets secured the second Wild Card spot in the Western Conference for the 2017 Stanley Cup playoffs. Connor was re-assigned to the Moose the next day. He finished the season third among league rookies with 25 goals and second on the team with 44 points. In recognition of his efforts, Connor received the Moose's Most Valuable Player award, Rookie of the Year award, and the Three Stars Award.

Before the Winnipeg Jets finalized their 2017–18 roster, Connor was assigned to the Manitoba Moose to begin the season. He tallied three goals and two assists over four games with the Moose before being recalled to the NHL on October 16 after Perreault suffered an injury. He reunited with Laine on the Jets' second line, along with Bryan Little, for his season debut against the Columbus Blue Jackets on October 16. However, during the game, Connor was moved onto a line with Mark Scheifele and Blake Wheeler who both assisted on Connor's first goal of the season. The trio remained together for the following game and they combined for nine points in the Jets' 7–1 win over the Pittsburgh Penguins. Within his first six games with the Jets, Connor tallied two goals and three assists. He remained on a line with Scheifele and Wheeler throughout the first half of the season and recorded nine goals and eight assists while averaging 17:50 in ice time. Connor missed his first game with the Jets on December 3 due to a lower-body injury but returned the following game. Following Scheifele's injury in mid-December, Connor and Wheeler gained Laine as their new linemate. The trio remained together for 16 games until Scheifele returned on February 9. Despite the changing linemates, Connor had amassed 18 goals and 17 assists through his first 51 games of the season. He ranked fifth on the team in scoring and seventh among NHL rookies. His success continued through March and he quickly ranked second among rookies in scoring with 28 goals. While climbing the ranks, Connor also became the second rookie in NHL history to score two regular-season overtime goals in consecutive games. On March 25, Connor recorded a goal and two assists to help the Jets clinch a spot in the 2018 Stanley Cup playoffs. Following this game, Connor tied with Brock Boeser for the rookie goal-scoring lead and ranked fifth in the NHL with 50 points. He was subsequently recognized by the NHL with their Third Star of the Week honor. On April 3, Connor scored another overtime winner and added two assists to help the Jets become the 80th team in NHL history to win 50 games in a season. He finished out the 2017–18 season scoring nine goals through his final 13 games. Connor finished his rookie season as the NHL's leading rookie goal scorer with 31 goals. He also added 26 assists for 57 points through 76 games. However, he was ultimately left off the ballot for the Calder Memorial Trophy as the NHL's top rookie.

Connor was one of eight Jets players to make their NHL postseason debut in Game 1 of the Western Conference First Round against the Minnesota Wild. During their series, Connor tallied two assists in five games as the Jets beat the Wild and moved on to the second round against the Nashville Predators. As a result of his slow start, head coach Paul Maurice moved him onto a line with Paul Stastny and Patrik Laine, with Nikolaj Ehlers replacing him on the top line. After playing Games 3 and 4 on the second line, Connor was returned to the Jets' top line for Game 5. In his first game back on the top line, Connor set a franchise record for most points by a Jets rookie in a single postseason game. He tallied his first two playoff goals and added an assist to lift the Jets 6–2 over the Nashville Predators. Wheeler and Connor each recorded two assists to help the Jets qualify for the Western Conference Final against the Vegas Golden Knights. Connor entered the Western Conference final with two goals and four assists while his line had combined 11 goals and 17 assists for 28 points. However, the trio only combined for three goals during the series as the Jets fell to the Golden Knights in five games. Connor ranked fourth in Calder Memorial Trophy voting, which was ultimately won by New York Islanders forward Mathew Barzal.

Following their lengthy playoff run, Connor returned to the Jets for their 2018–19 season and was reunited with Scheifele and Wheeler. In their first game back together, Connor recorded a goal and an assist while the trio combined for six points against the St. Louis Blues. From there, he produced nearly a point per game and quickly accumulated four goals four assists to rank second on the team with eight points through nine games. The trio lasted until mid-October when Connor was moved to Winnipeg's second line with Bryan Little and Mathieu Perreault. He was shortly thereafter reunited with Laine and the two reignited their chemistry together. On November 24, he recorded four assists while Laine tallied five goals against the St. Louis Blues. Connor credited both Laine and Little to his early season offensive output, 13 goals and 15 assists through 31 games. He remained on the second line before both Ehlers and Dustin Byfuglien suffered injuries in January. As such, Connor was promoted back to the Jets' top line with Scheifele and Wheeler. Connor set numerous personal records in January, including scoring his 100th career point on January 19 against the Dallas Stars. He also set a new career high in ice time with 24:52 against the Minnesota Wild on January 10. Through the teams' first 17 games of 2019, Connor had tallied nine goals and six assists for 15 points. At the end of February, head coach Paul Maurice moved Laine to the Jets' top line and replaced him with Kevin Hayes and Nikolaj Ehlers on the second line with Connor. Although Connor played alongside the two during the Jets' road trip, he was shortly thereafter reunited with Laine. On March 23, Connor scored his first career NHL hat-trick, and added an assist, in a 5–0 win over the Nashville Predators. In doing so, he helped the Jets clinch a spot in the 2019 Stanley Cup playoffs. He also became the fifth player in franchise history to record multiple 30-goal seasons and the second player to do so in his first two full seasons. As a result, Connor was recognized as the NHL's First Star of the Week for the week ending on March 24. Connor finished the 2018–19 season with a career-high 34 goals and 32 assists for 66 points. During the playoffs, Connor added three goals and two assists for five points through six games as the Jets fell to the St. Louis Blues.

==== Ascending star (2019–present) ====
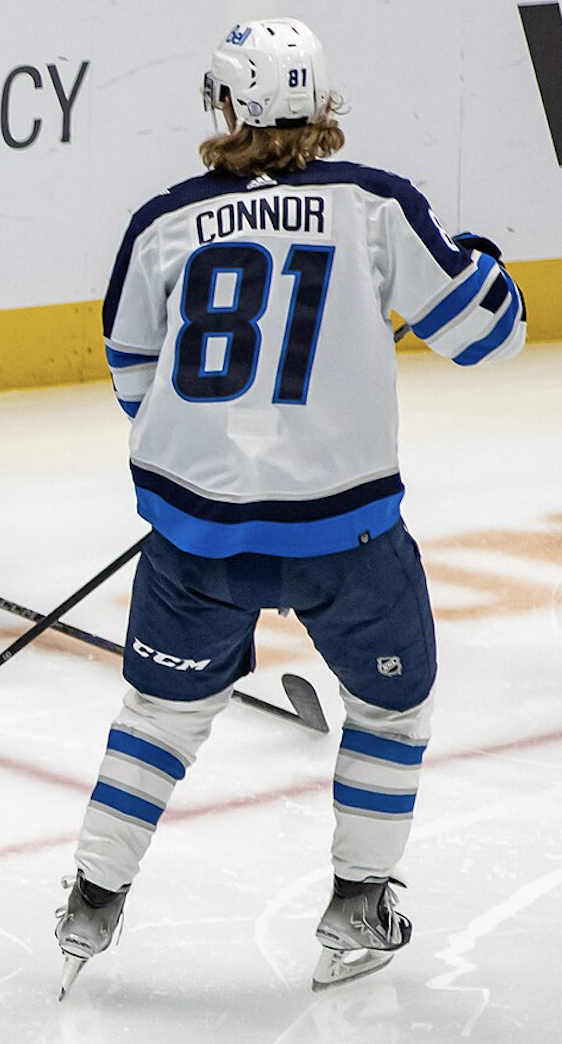
Connor in 2022 during a game against the Seattle Kraken.

As he had concluded his entry-level contract, Connor and the Jets began engaging in contract negotiations ahead of the 2019–20 season. As the negotiations bled into training camp, Connor began skating at the University of Michigan prior to a deal being signed. On September 28, after missing most of the preseason, Connor signed a seven-year, $50 million contract extension to remain with the Jets. Upon joining the Jets for their season opener against the New York Rangers, Connor was reunited with Mark Scheifele and Blake Wheeler on the top line. Connor began the season with two points through six games but ranked second in the league with 28 shots on net. Through the first four games of November, Connor accumulated two goals and five assists for seven points. He continued to improve as the month continued and led the team in scoring with three goals and eight assists for 11 points through nine games. On November 19, Connor played in his 200th career NHL game against the Nashville Predators. While playing alongside Scheifele and Laine, Connor helped the Jets improve to a winning 17–10–1 record through the start of December. On December 31, 2019, Connor recorded his second career NHL hat trick in a 7–4 win against the Colorado Avalanche. This gave him six goals over his past four games and 20 goals on the season. Although the Jets struggled to win home games, Connor continued to score through January and added seven goals and five assists over eight games. In February, Connor set numerous career and franchise records for the Jets. After recording four points in a win over the Ottawa Senators and three in a victory over the Chicago Blackhawks, Connor became the third different player in Winnipeg Jets history to record at least three points on consecutive days. Following another game against the Senators, he also became the third player in Jets/Thrashers history with at least three consecutive 30-goal seasons. In the final game of the month, Connor became the fourth player from the 2015 NHL draft to reach the score 100 goals in the NHL. When the NHL paused play due to the COVID-19 pandemic in March, Connor had already set new career highs in goals, assists, and points. He finished the shortened regular season with 38 goals and 35 assists to tie Scheifele for the team's scoring lead with 73 points. Beyond accumulating points, Connor also finished with the highest average ice-time among left wingers and ranked 10th in the NHL with 239 shots on goal. A few months later, Connor and the Jets returned to play in the 2020 Stanley Cup playoffs within the NHL's 'bubble' in Edmonton.

Connor achieved a Gordie Howe hat trick in a 4–1 win over the Pittsburgh Penguins on November 22, 2024. He assisted on a Gabriel Vilardi goal in the second period and fought Sidney Crosby and scored an empty netter in the third.

On October 8, 2025, a day before the start of the 2025–26 season, the Jets announced that Connor had signed an eight-year contract extension, keeping him in Winnipeg through 2034. The deal is worth $96 million with an annual cap hit to the team of $12 million. The deal pays $55 million in salary and $41 million in signing bonuses and will give Connor an opportunity to become the all time franchise points leader.

== International play ==
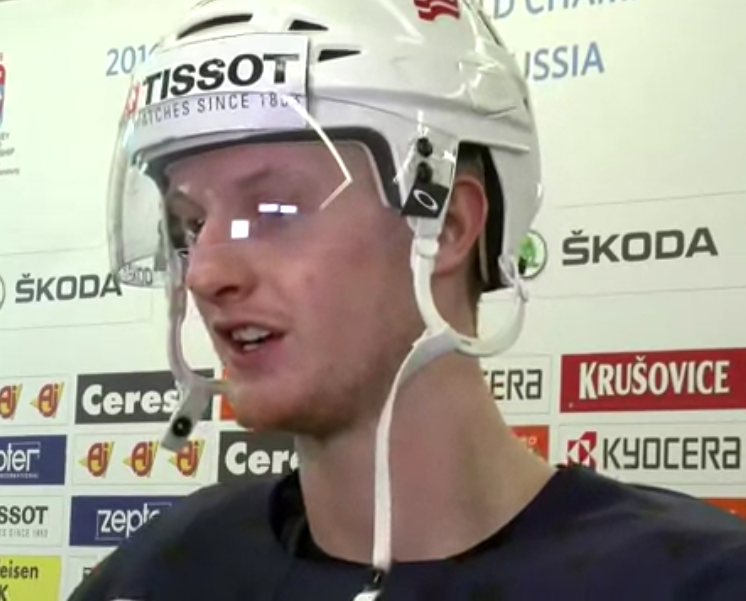
- Connor with the United States at the 2013 World Championship

Medal record

Men's ice hockey

Representing the United States

Olympic Games
Gold medal – first place	2026 Milano Cortina	

World Junior A Challenge
Gold medal – first place	2013 Yarmouth	
Gold medal – first place	2014 Kindersley	

World U18 Championship
Gold medal – first place	2014 Finland	

Ivan Hlinka Memorial Tournament
Silver medal – second place	2013 Piešťany	

As an American citizen, Connor has represented the United States at both the junior and senior levels on the international stage. He first represented the United States at the 2012 Under-17 Five Nations Tournament. During the tournament, he scored four goals and added two assists to help Team USA clinch a gold medal. Following this, Connor was named to Team USA again to represent them at the 2013 Ivan Hlinka Memorial Tournament. After earning a silver medal, Connor represented Team USA a second time in 2013 while playing in the 2013 World Junior A Challenge. During the tournament, Connor recorded two goals and three assists in four games, including the game-winning goal in the championship game against Russia to clinch a gold medal.

Connor again represented the United States twice in 2014 at two different international tournaments. He played in his first IIHF World U18 Championship in April with Team USA, helping them clinch a gold medal. Following this, he represented Team USA at the 2014 World Junior A Challenge, where he recorded one goal and one assist in four games to win a gold medal.

While attending the University of Michigan, Connor was chosen to represent the United States men's national ice hockey team for the first time at the 2016 IIHF World Championship alongside UMich line-mates J. T. Compher and Tyler Motte.

On January 2, 2026, he was named to Team USA's roster for the 2026 Winter Olympics. Connor played in the first two games, before he was a healthy scratch for four consecutive games including the gold medal game after he did not have a shot on goal for his first two games.

== Personal life ==
Connor became engaged to his longtime girlfriend Ally Petack in September 2023. They married in July 2024 and welcomed their first child in March 2025.

Amid online backlash faced by the men's Olympic hockey team regarding the inclusion of FBI director Kash Patel during their gold medal celebrations and members of the team laughing at President Trump's comments of being impeached if he did not invite the women's team to the White House, the team was invited to meet with the president and attend the State of the Union. Connor did not meet the president nor attend the State of the Union.

== Career statistics ==
=== Regular season and playoffs ===
			Regular season					Playoffs
Season	Team	League	GP	G	A	Pts	PIM	GP	G	A	Pts	PIM
2012–13	Youngstown Phantoms	USHL	62	17	24	41	16	9	0	3	3	0
2013–14	Youngstown Phantoms	USHL	56	31	43	74	12	—	—	—	—	—
2014–15	Youngstown Phantoms	USHL	56	34	46	80	6	4	3	1	4	0
2015–16	University of Michigan	B1G	38	35	36	71	6	—	—	—	—	—
2016–17	Winnipeg Jets	NHL	20	2	3	5	4	—	—	—	—	—
2016–17	Manitoba Moose	AHL	52	25	19	44	14	—	—	—	—	—
2017–18	Manitoba Moose	AHL	4	3	2	5	0	—	—	—	—	—
2017–18	Winnipeg Jets	NHL	76	31	26	57	16	17	3	7	10	2
2018–19	Winnipeg Jets	NHL	82	34	32	66	18	6	3	2	5	0
2019–20	Winnipeg Jets	NHL	71	38	35	73	34	4	0	1	1	0
2020–21	Winnipeg Jets	NHL	56	26	24	50	12	8	3	4	7	0
2021–22	Winnipeg Jets	NHL	79	47	46	93	4	—	—	—	—	—
2022–23	Winnipeg Jets	NHL	82	31	49	80	20	5	3	1	4	0
2023–24	Winnipeg Jets	NHL	65	34	27	61	6	5	3	2	5	4
2024–25	Winnipeg Jets	NHL	82	41	56	97	25	13	5	12	17	0
2025–26	Winnipeg Jets	NHL	82	39	53	92	16	—	—	—	—	—
NHL totals			695	323	351	674	155	58	20	29	49	6

=== International ===
Year	Team	Event	Result	GP	G	A	Pts	PIM
2013	United States	IH18	2nd place, silver medalist(s)	5	2	1	3	2
2014	United States	WJC18	1st place, gold medalist(s)	7	4	3	7	0
2016	United States	WC	4th	5	0	2	2	0
2025	United States	4NF	2nd	3	0	1	1	0
2026	United States	OG	1st place, gold medalist(s)	2	0	0	0	0
Junior totals				12	6	4	10	2
Senior totals				10	0	3	3	0

== Awards and honors ==
Award	Year	Ref
USHL
USHL First All-Star Team	2014, 2015	
USHL Player of the Year	2015	
Dave Tyler Junior Player of the Year Award	2015	
College
HCA Rookie of the Month	December, 2015; January, 2016	
All-Big Ten First Team	2016	
All-Big Ten Freshman Team	2016	
Big Ten Freshman of the Year	2016	
Big Ten Player of the Year	2016	
Big Ten Scoring Champion	2016	
AHCA West First-Team All-American	2016	
National Rookie of the Year	2016	
Big Ten Tournament Most Outstanding Player	2016	
Big Ten All-Tournament Team	2016	
NHL
NHL All-Star Game	2022, 2024	
Lady Byng Memorial Trophy	2022	
NHL First All-Star Team	2025	

Awards and achievements
Preceded by Nikolaj Ehlers	Winnipeg Jets first-round draft pick 2015	Succeeded by Jack Roslovic
Preceded by Jack Eichel	Tim Taylor Award; 2015–16	Succeeded by Clayton Keller
Preceded by Jack Eichel	NCAA Ice Hockey Scoring Champion; 2015–16	Succeeded by Zach Aston-Reese / Mike Vecchione / Tyler Kelleher
Preceded by Dylan Larkin	Big Ten Freshman of the Year; 2015–16	Succeeded by Trent Frederic
Preceded by Jake Hildebrand	Big Ten Player of the Year; 2015–16	Succeeded by Tyler Sheehy
Preceded by Zach Hyman	Big Ten Scoring Champion; 2015–16	Succeeded by Mason Jobst / Tyler Sheehy
Preceded by Adam Wilcox	Big Ten Tournament MOP; 2016	Succeeded by Peyton Jones
Preceded by Jaccob Slavin	Lady Byng Memorial Trophy; 2022	Succeeded by Anže Kopitar
