= Tyler Motte =

American ice hockey player (born 1995)

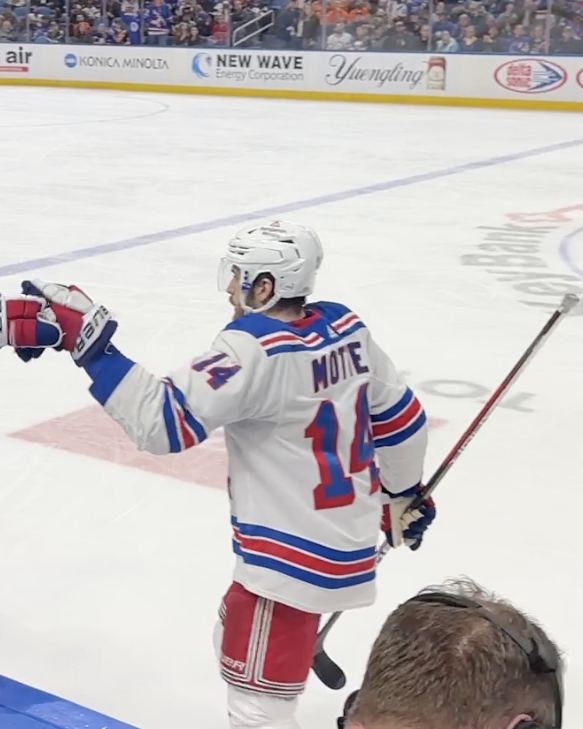
- Motte with the New York Rangers in 2023
- Born: March 10, 1995 (age 31) St. Clair, Michigan, U.S.
- Height: 5 ft 10 in (178 cm)
- Weight: 192 lb (87 kg; 13 st 10 lb)
- Position: Forward
- Shoots: Left
- team Former teams: Free agent Chicago Blackhawks; Columbus Blue Jackets; Vancouver Canucks; New York Rangers; Ottawa Senators; Tampa Bay Lightning; Detroit Red Wings
- National team: United States
- NHL draft: 121st overall, 2013; Chicago Blackhawks
- Playing career: 2016–present

Tyler Motte (born March 10, 1995) is an American professional ice hockey player who is a forward. He most recently played on a professional try-out for the Charlotte Checkers of the American Hockey League (AHL). Motte was drafted 121st overall by the Chicago Blackhawks in the 2013 NHL entry draft, and spent 33 games with the team in 2017 before being traded to the Columbus Blue Jackets. He has also played for the Vancouver Canucks, New York Rangers, Ottawa Senators, Tampa Bay Lightning, and Detroit Red Wings.

== Playing career ==
=== Amateur ===
As a youth, Motte played in the 2008 Quebec International Pee-Wee Hockey Tournament with the Detroit Red Wings minor ice hockey team.

During the 2010–11 season, Motte played for the Detroit Honeybaked U16 team of the Tier 1 Elite Hockey League. He recorded 22 goals and 14 assists in 33 games. Honeybaked captured USA Hockey's Tier 1 national championship and Motte had three goals and three assists in six tournament games. He scored two third period goals, the first assisted by Jon Pierret to tie the game, for Honeybaked in the 3–2 comeback win over Shattuck St. Mary's in the championship game.

Motte trained with the USA Hockey National Team Development Program U-17 team during the 2011–12 season, where he recorded 25 goals and 16 assists in 53 games. Motte played two games for the U-18 team, scoring once. In two USHL playoff games he scored two goals. During the 2012–13 season, he recorded 26 goals and 19 assists in 67 games for the U-18 team.

=== College ===
Motte began his collegiate career for the Michigan Wolverines during the 2013–14 season. During his freshman season, Motte recorded nine goals and nine assists in 34 games. He scored his first career goal on October 12, 2013, against Jordan Ruby of RIT. He was named the Big Ten Second Star of the Week for the week ending October 20, 2013, his first career Big Ten weekly award. He was named the Big Ten Second Star of the Week for the week ending November 26, 2013. Motte was awarded the conference's second star after he recorded his first career multiple-point effort with a goal and two assists against Niagara.

During the 2014–15 season, Motte recorded nine goals and 22 assists in 35 games, finishing third on the team in assists, and fourth in points. He led all Michigan forwards with 43 blocked shots. He was named the Big Ten Second Star of the Week for the week ending December 9, 2014. He recorded his first career four-point night with four assists in an 8–3 win over Ohio State. He became the first Michigan player to record four assists in a game since Aaron Palushaj on February 13, 2009.

During the 2015–16 season, Motte recorded 32 goals and 24 assists in 38 games. His 56 points ranked third in the country in scoring. During the season opener on October 16, 2015, Motte scored the game-winning goal against Mercyhurst. He was named the Big Ten First Star of the Week, and NCAA Second Star of the Week, for the week ending January 19, 2016. He recorded four goals and three assists in two games against Ohio State. On January 17, he recorded a career-high five points, including his first career hat-trick.

He was named the Big Ten First Star of the Week, and NCAA First Star of the Week, for the week ending February 2, 2016. He recorded four goals and three assists, 17 shots on goal and a plus-5 rating in two wins against Penn State. Motte matched a career-high with five points on January 28, and followed that up with two goals on January 30. Motte was named the Hockey Commissioners' Association National Player of the Month for the month of January. He recorded a goal in every game during the month and held lead the Wolverines to a 5–0–1 record in January. He led the nation with 18 points and 10 goals in just six contests for an average of 3.00 points per game. By reaching 20 goals in 22 games, he and teammate Kyle Connor became the fastest Michigan players to reach 20 goals since Kevin Porter had 20 goals in 21 games during the 2007–08 season. He was named the Big Ten First Star of the Week for the week ending February 9. Motte scored three of Michigan's six goals on the weekend for a total of four points. He joined Kyle Connor as the only players in the Big Ten to earn First Star of the Week honors three times this season.

During the 2016 Big Ten men's ice hockey tournament, Motte tied the Big Ten Tournament championship game record for most goals by an individual with two goals. With four points during the Big Ten Tournament, Motte surpassed 100 career points, becoming the 85th Michigan player to reach the milestone.

During the 2016 NCAA Division I men's ice hockey tournament, Motte scored the overtime game-winning goal in the regional semifinals against Notre Dame, giving Michigan its first NCAA Tournament win since 2011.

Following an outstanding season with the Wolverines, Motte was named to the All-Big Ten First Team. He ranked No. 2 in the nation in goal scoring, and his 12-game goal scoring streak from December 30, 2015, to February 19, 2016, was the longest by a Michigan player in the Red Berenson coaching era, since 1984. Motte led the team in blocked shots among forwards, and ranked No. 2 in the NCAA, with 70. He was named a top-ten finalist for the Hobey Baker Award. He was also named an AHCA First Team All-American.

=== Professional ===
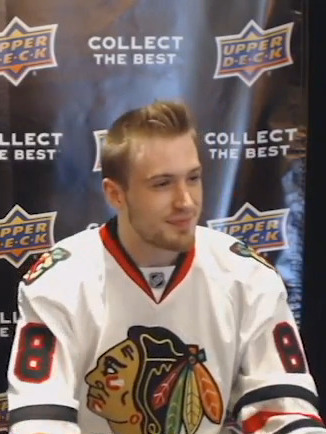
Motte in September 2016

On April 6, 2016, Motte signed a three-year, entry-level contract with the Chicago Blackhawks of the National Hockey League (NHL). He was signed to an amateur tryout contract with the Rockford IceHogs, the American Hockey League (AHL) affiliate of the Chicago Blackhawks. Motte finished the 2015–16 season with Rockford, collecting two goals and five points in five games and two goals in three games during the Calder Cup playoffs. He opened the 2016–17 season with the Blackhawks. Motte scored his first career NHL goal on October 21, 2016, in a 3–2 loss to the Columbus Blue Jackets. He was injured in a game versus the Dallas Stars on November 6, missing five games. Upon his return, his play declined and he was demoted to Rockford on January 3, 2017. On April 18, Motte was one of three players recalled from Rockford by Chicago at the end of the IceHogs season.

On June 23, 2017, Motte was included in a blockbuster trade by the Blackhawks to the Blue Jackets along with Artemi Panarin and a sixth-round pick in 2017 in exchange for Brandon Saad, Anton Forsberg and a fifth-round pick in the 2018 NHL entry draft. In his only season with Columbus, Motte was among the last players cut by the Blue Jackets during training camp. Josh Anderson ended his contract holdout and due to having too many forwards on the roster, Motte was assigned to their AHL affiliate, the Cleveland Monsters. He was recalled by Columbus on October 30, after recording five goals and seven points in seven games with Cleveland. He played in 19 games with Columbus, registering three goals and four points before he was sent to Cleveland again on December 19. He was recalled on December 22, before being sent back to Cleveland on January 12, 2018. After Sonny Milano was injured, Motte was recalled by Columbus on January 17, 2018.

On February 26, 2018, Motte and Jussi Jokinen were traded to the Vancouver Canucks in exchange for Thomas Vanek. On March 13, 2019, Motte scored two goals in a span of 11 seconds during a game versus the New York Rangers, helping Vancouver win 4–1. Playing in his first full season in the NHL in 2018–19, Motte set career highs in goals (9), assists (7), and points (16), playing on Vancouver's fourth line. On July 2, 2019, Motte re-signed with Vancouver to a one-year, $975,000 contract. During the 2020 Stanley Cup playoffs, his first time playing in the NHL postseason, Motte scored twice in Game 5 of Vancouver's first-round series versus the St. Louis Blues, helping Vancouver win 4–3 to take a 3–2 series lead. Motte again scored two goals in the following game, which Vancouver won 6–3 to win the series in six games. Vancouver lost in the following round to the Vegas Golden Knights in seven games. On October 9, 2020, Motte was re-signed by Vancouver to a two-year, $2.45 million contract.

On March 21, 2022, Motte was traded to the New York Rangers at the trade deadline in exchange for a fourth-round draft pick in the 2023 NHL entry draft. He had 15 points in 49 games with the Canucks that season, playing on Vancouver's penalty kill unit. He did not score a point with the Rangers in nine games, but registered two goals in 15 playoff games before the Rangers were knocked out by the Tampa Bay Lightning in the Eastern Conference Final.

An unrestricted free agent following the end of the season, on September 14, 2022, Motte signed a one-year contract with the Ottawa Senators. On February 19, 2023, Motte was traded back to the New York Rangers in exchange for Julien Gauthier and a conditional seventh-round draft pick in the 2023 NHL Entry Draft. On March 2, Motte was injured by a hit from former teammate Austin Watson during a 5–3 loss to the Senators. He missed two games, returning to the Rangers on March 11 against the Buffalo Sabres. On April 6, Motte marked his first regular season multi-goal game in a 6–3 victory over the Tampa Bay Lightning. He had previously scored twice in a game only in the playoffs.

On September 9, 2023, Motte signed a one-year contract with the Tampa Bay Lightning. During the 2023–24 season he recorded six goals and three assists in 69 games.

On July 2, 2024, Motte signed a one-year, $800,000 contract with the Detroit Red Wings.

As a free agent at the conclusion of his contract with the Red Wings, Motte accepted a try-out invitation to join defending champions the Florida Panthers training camp approaching the 2025–26 season. After his release from the Panthers, Motte was signed to a try-out contract with AHL affiliate, the Charlotte Checkers, on October 15, 2025.

== International play ==
Medal record

Representing United States

Ice hockey

World U-17 Hockey Challenge
Silver medal – second place	2012 Canada	

IIHF World U18 Championship
Silver medal – second place	2013 Russia	

Motte represented the United States at the 2012 World U-17 Hockey Challenge, where he recorded one assist in five games, and won a silver medal. Motte represented the United States at the 2013 IIHF World U18 Championships, where he recorded five goals and two assist in seven five games, and won a silver medal. His five goals led the team, while his seven points were tied with J. T. Compher for the team lead.

Motte represented the United States at the 2015 World Junior Ice Hockey Championship, where he recorded one assist in five games, and finished in fifth place.

Motte represented the United States at the 2016 IIHF World Championship alongside line-mates J. T. Compher and Kyle Connor. He recorded one goal and two assists in ten games.

== Personal life ==
In January 2020, Motte was in a Canucks video for their annual Hockey Talks event. In the video he stated he was diagnosed with anxiety and depression.

== Career statistics ==
=== Regular season and playoffs ===
			Regular season					Playoffs
Season	Team	League	GP	G	A	Pts	PIM	GP	G	A	Pts	PIM
2011–12	U.S. NTDP Juniors	USHL	36	15	13	28	32	2	2	0	2	0
2011–12	U.S. NTDP U17	USDP	53	25	16	41	62	—	—	—	—	—
2011–12	U.S. NTDP U18	USDP	2	1	0	1	0	—	—	—	—	—
2012–13	U.S. NTDP Juniors	USHL	26	11	6	17	6	—	—	—	—	—
2012–13	U.S. NTDP U18	USDP	67	26	19	45	50	—	—	—	—	—
2013–14	University of Michigan	B1G	34	9	9	18	22	—	—	—	—	—
2014–15	University of Michigan	B1G	35	9	22	31	14	—	—	—	—	—
2015–16	University of Michigan	B1G	38	32	24	56	36	—	—	—	—	—
2015–16	Rockford IceHogs	AHL	5	2	3	5	2	3	2	0	2	0
2016–17	Chicago Blackhawks	NHL	33	4	3	7	14	—	—	—	—	—
2016–17	Rockford IceHogs	AHL	43	10	6	16	20	—	—	—	—	—
2017–18	Cleveland Monsters	AHL	17	9	2	11	25	—	—	—	—	—
2017–18	Columbus Blue Jackets	NHL	31	3	2	5	2	—	—	—	—	—
2017–18	Vancouver Canucks	NHL	15	2	0	2	4	—	—	—	—	—
2017–18	Utica Comets	AHL	2	0	0	0	2	5	2	0	2	2
2018–19	Vancouver Canucks	NHL	74	9	7	16	10	—	—	—	—	—
2019–20	Vancouver Canucks	NHL	34	4	4	8	10	17	4	1	5	2
2020–21	Vancouver Canucks	NHL	24	6	3	9	14	—	—	—	—	—
2021–22	Vancouver Canucks	NHL	49	7	8	15	22	—	—	—	—	—
2021–22	New York Rangers	NHL	9	0	0	0	0	15	2	0	2	4
2022–23	Ottawa Senators	NHL	38	3	6	9	4	—	—	—	—	—
2022–23	New York Rangers	NHL	24	5	5	10	2	7	0	0	0	12
2023–24	Tampa Bay Lightning	NHL	69	6	3	9	28	5	1	0	1	2
2024–25	Detroit Red Wings	NHL	55	4	5	9	6	—	—	—	—	—
2025–26	Charlotte Checkers	AHL	4	1	0	1	2	—	—	—	—	—
NHL totals			455	53	46	99	116	44	7	1	8	20

=== International ===
Year	Team	Event	Result	GP	G	A	Pts	PIM
2012	United States	U17	2nd place, silver medalist(s)	5	0	1	1	6
2013	United States	U18	2nd place, silver medalist(s)	7	5	2	7	4
2015	United States	WJC	5th	5	0	1	1	2
2016	United States	WC	4th	10	1	2	3	0
Junior totals				17	5	4	9	12
Senior totals				10	1	2	3	0

== Awards and honors ==
Awards	Year	Ref
College
HCA Player of the Month	January 2016	
All-Big Ten First Team	2016	
AHCA West First-Team All-American	2016	
Vancouver Canucks
Fred J. Hume Award	2021	
Daniel & Henrik Sedin Award	2021	
