= Matt Vidal =

British-American sociologist

Matt Vidal is a British-American sociologist. He is Reader in Sociology and Comparative Political Economy in the Institute for International Management, Loughborough University London.

== Education ==
Vidal graduated from South Dakota State University and received his PhD in sociology from the University of Wisconsin-Madison. He has been a Postdoctoral Fellow at the University of California, Los Angeles (UCLA) Institute for Research on Labor and Employment, a Research Fellow at the Weizenbaum Institute for the Networked Society, Berlin, and a visiting researcher at the Department of Management, Paris Dauphine University, Paris, and the Max Planck Institute for the Study of Societies, Cologne.

=== Contributions ===
Vidal has made contributions to many areas, including sociology of work, human resource management and employment relations; labor markets; institutional theory; comparative political economy; and Marxist theory.

He is author of Organizing Prosperity (Economic Policy Institute) and co-editor of Comparative Political Economy of Work (Palgrave) and The Oxford Handbook of Karl Marx (Oxford University Press).
