= 2016 Big Ten men's ice hockey tournament =

- Dates: March 17–19, 2016
- Teams: 6
- Finals site: Xcel Energy Center; Saint Paul, Minnesota
- Champions: Michigan (1st title)
- Winning coach: Red Berenson (1st title)
- MVP: Kyle Connor (Michigan)
- Big Ten men's Ice Hockey Tournaments

The 2016 Big Ten Conference Men's Ice Hockey Tournament was the third tournament in conference history played between March 17 and March 19, 2016 at Xcel Energy Center in Saint Paul, Minnesota. The winner of the tournament was the Michigan Wolverines, who earned the Big Ten's automatic bid to the 2016 NCAA Division I Men's Ice Hockey Tournament.

== Format ==
All six Big Ten teams participated in the tournament, which was a single-elimination format. Teams were seeded No. 1 through No. 6 according to the final regular season conference standings. In the quarterfinals, No. 3 played No. 6 and No. 4 played No. 5. In the semifinals, No. 2 played the winner of the first game and No. 1 played the winner of the second game (the teams are not reseeded). The two semifinal winners played each other in the Championship Game.

=== Conference standings ===
Note: GP = Games played; W = Wins; L = Losses; T = Ties; PTS = Points; GF = Goals For; GA = Goals Against

2015–16 Big Ten ice hockey standings
	Conference record								Overall record					
	GP	W	L	T	SOW	PTS	GF	GA	GP	W	L	T	GF	GA
Minnesota†	20	14	6	0	0	42	76	58	37	20	17	0	121	108
#6 Michigan*	20	12	5	3	2	41	107	68	38	25	8	5	181	115
Penn State	20	10	9	1	1	32	64	72	38	21	13	4	140	122
Ohio State	20	8	8	4	1	29	79	77	36	14	18	4	128	125
Michigan State	20	6	12	2	0	21	47	72	37	10	23	4	93	124
Wisconsin	20	3	13	4	2	15	54	80	35	8	19	8	93	127
Championship: March 18, 2017 † indicates conference regular season champion; * indicates conference tournament champion Rankings: USCHO.com Top 20 Poll; updated March 12, 2016

== Bracket ==
Quarterfinals; March 17
4	Ohio State	4*
5	Michigan State	3
3	Penn State	5
6	Wisconsin	2

Semifinals; March 18
1	Minnesota	4
4	Ohio State	2
2	Michigan	7
3	Penn State	2

Championship; March 19
1	Minnesota	3
2	Michigan	5

Note: * denotes overtime periods.

=== Quarterfinals ===
All times are local (CT) (UTC−5).

==== (3) Penn State vs. (6) Wisconsin ====
March 17	Penn State	5 – 2	Wisconsin	Xcel Energy Center	Recap
Eric Scheid (12) - (Luke Juha, Kevin Kerr) - 12:55; Connor Varley (2) - (Eric Scheid, David Goodwin) - 16:55		First period	No scoring
Ricky DeRosa (6) - (Luke Juha, Tommy Olczyk) - 13:18; Tommy Olczyk (11) - (Ricky DeRosa) - 14:53		Second period	3:49 - Luke Kunin (19) - (Cameron Hughes, Corbin McGuire)
Eric Scheid (13) - en - (David Goodwin, Luke Juha) - 19:16		Third period	3:26 - Grant Besse (11) - (Eddie Wittchow)
Eamon McAdam (35 saves / 37 shots)		Goalie stats	Matt Jurusik (24 saves / 28 shots)

==== (4) Ohio State vs. (5) Michigan State ====
March 17	Ohio State	4 – 3	OT	Michigan State	Xcel Energy Center	Recap
John Wiitala (11) - (Mason Jobst, David Gust) - 0:38; Tommy Parran (2) - (Josh Healey, Kevin Miller) - 18:52		First period		No scoring
No scoring		Second period		5:15 - pp - Joe Cox (11) - (Travis Walsh, Matt DeBlouw); 8:24 - pp - Matt DeBlouw (9) - (Travis Walsh, Villiam Haac); 11:31 - pp - Michael Ferrantino (10) - (Zach Osburn, Mackenzi MacEachern)
Matthew Weis (11) - (Drew Brevig, Josh Healey) - 3:17		Third period		No Scoring
Mason Jobst (12) - (Craig Dalrymple) - 13:47		First overtime period		No scoring
Christian Frey (31 saves / 34 shots)		Goalie stats		Jake Hildebrand (44 saves / 48 shots)

=== Semifinals ===
==== (2) Michigan vs. (3) Penn State ====
March 18	Michigan	7 – 2	Penn State	Xcel Energy Center	Recap
Max Shuart (5) - (Michael Downing, Dexter Dancs) - 10:35; Alex Kile (16) - (Tyler Motte, J. T. Compher) - pp - 16:55		First period	No scoring
Kyle Connor (31) - (J. T. Compher) - 0:48; Kyle Connor (32) - (J. T. Compher. Zach Werenski) - pp - 5:29; Kyle Connor (33) - (J. T. Compher) - 9:09		Second period	11:45 - pp - Kevin Kerr - (David Goodwin, David Glen)
Cristoval Nieves (10) - (Nicholas Boka, Zach Werenski) - 0:46; Kyle Connor (34) - (J. T. Compher, Tyler Motte) - pp - 10:52		Third period	1:28 - pp - Luke Juha - (David Goodwin, Kevin Kerr)
Steve Racine (40 saves / 42 shots)		Goalie stats	Eamon McAdam (14 saves / 18 shots); Matthew Skoff (18 saves / 21 shots)

==== (1) Minnesota vs. (4) Ohio State ====
March 18	Minnesota	4 – 2	Ohio State	Xcel Energy Center	Recap
No scoring		First period	13:01 - Kevin Miller (4) - (Janik Möser)
No scoring		Second period	No scoring
Tyler Sheehy (12) - (Justin Kloos) - 1:36; Vinni Lettieri (7) - (Leon Bristedt, Brent Gates Jr.) - 5:20; Taylor Cammarata (6) - (Tyler Sheehy) - 11:11; Taylor Cammarata (7) - (Tyler Sheehy) - 16:38		Third period	17:44 - David Gust (11) - (Anthony Greco, Matthew Weis)
Eric Schierhorn (27 saves / 29 shots)		Goalie stats	Christian Frey (41 saves / 45 shots)

=== Championship ===
==== (1) Minnesota vs. (2) Michigan ====
March 19	Minnesota	3 – 5	Michigan	Xcel Energy Center	Recap
No scoring		First period	9:33 - pp - Tyler Motte (30) - (Kyle Connor, Zach Werenski)
Leon Bristedt (20) - (Vinni Lettieri, Jack Glover) - 6:35; Jake Bischoff (6) - (Michael Brodzinski, Justin Kloos) - 10:21; Justin Kloos (16) - (Tommy Novak, Justin Kloos) - pp - 16:50		Second period	1:31 - pp - J. T. Compher (14) - Zach Werenski, Kyle Connor)
No scoring		Third period	3:28 - Kyle Connor (35) - (J. T. Compher, Zach Werenski); 15:27 - Zach Wereneski (10) - (J. T. Compher, Kyle Connor); 19:37 - en - Tyler Motte (31) - (Sam Piazza)
Eric Schierhorn (30 saves / 34 shots)		Goalie stats	Steve Racine (30 saves / 33 shots)

=== Tournament awards ===
==== Most Outstanding Player ====
- Forward: Kyle Connor (Michigan)

==== All-Tournament Team ====
- Goaltender: Steve Racine (Michigan)
- Defensemen: Zach Werenski (Michigan), Luke Juha (Penn State)
- Forwards: J. T. Compher (Michigan), Kyle Connor (Michigan), Tyler Sheehy (Minnesota)
