= Broc (disambiguation) =

Broc is a municipality in the canton of Fribourg in Switzerland.

Broc may also refer to:

- Broc, Maine-et-Loire, a former commune in France
- Jean Broc (1771–1850), French neoclassical painter
- Numa Broc (1934–2017), French geographer
- Broc Glover (born 1960), American former motocross racer
- Broc Little (born 1988), American ice hockey player
- Broc Lowry (born 2004), American football player
- Broc McCauley (born 1986), former Australian rules footballer
- Broc Parkes (born 1981), Australian motorcycle racer
- Broc Rutter (born 1997), American football player

== See also ==
- Le Broc (disambiguation)
- Ranulf de Broc (died c. 1179), Anglo-Norman nobleman
- Brock (disambiguation)
- Brok (disambiguation)
