= 2014 World Junior A Challenge =

Tournament details
- Host country: Canada
- Venue(s): West Central Events Centre in Kindersley, Saskatchewan
- Dates: December 14, 2014 – December 20, 2014
- Teams: 6

Final positions
- Champions: United States (6th title)
- Runner-up: Denmark
- Third place: Russia
- Fourth place: Canada East

Tournament statistics
- Games played: 13
- Scoring leader(s): (Denmark) Nikolaj Ehlers (9 pts)

Awards
- MVP: (Denmark) Nikolaj Ehlers

The 2014 World Junior A Challenge was an international Junior "A" ice hockey tournament organized by Hockey Canada. It was hosted in Kindersley, Saskatchewan, from December 14–20, 2014, at the West Central Events Centre.

== Teams ==
- Canada East (9th Appearance)
- Canada West (9th Appearance, 6th as Hosts)
- Russia (9th Appearance)
- Switzerland (4th Appearance)
- United States (8th Appearance)
- Denmark (1st Appearance)

== Background ==
Canada East, Canada West, Russia, United States and Switzerland all returned, joined this year by a team from Denmark.

== Exhibition schedule ==
12 December 2014; 19:30	Canada East	2–5 ( )	Russia	Unity Skating Arena, Unity, Saskatchewan

Game reference

12 December 2014; 19:30	Canada West	3–6 ( )	United States	Eston Community Complex Arena, Eston, Saskatchewan

Game reference

12 December 2014; 20:00	Denmark	6–0 ( )	(Canada) Rosetown Redwings	SaskCan Centre, Rosetown, Saskatchewan

Game reference

== 2014 Tournament ==
=== Preliminary round ===
All times are local (UTC-6).

==== Group A ====
Team	Pld	W	OTW	OTL	L	GF	GA	GD	Pts
United States	2	2	0	0	0	10	2	+8	6
Switzerland	2	0	1	0	1	4	10	−6	2
Canada East	2	0	0	1	1	5	7	−2	1

14 December 2014; 15:30	Canada East	3–4 GWS (0–1, 2–1, 1–1) (OT: 0–0) (SO: 0–1)	Switzerland	West Central Events Centre

Game reference

Blake Mann-Dixon (0–0–1)
Goalies
Joren van Pottelberghe (1–0–0)

	0–1	7:16 – D. Riat (1) (M. Holdener) (PP)
C. Fryer (1) (L. Batt) – 20:27	1–1
K. Locke (1) (R. Kuffner, R. Kirkup) (PP) – 27:46	2–1
	2–2	28:08 – M. Moor (1) (C. Thürkauf, A. Impose)
L. Batt (1) (A. Tonge, A. Brady) – 44:33	3–2
	3–3	56:55 – T. Haussener (1) (D. Riat, M. Holdener)

A. Tonge (miss)
A. Brady (miss)
D. Board (miss)
Shootout
T. Haussener (miss)
D. Riat (miss)
A. Impose
10 min
Penalties
12 min
46
Shots
24

15 December 2014; 19:30	United States	7–0 (2–0, 3–0, 2–0)	Switzerland	West Central Events Centre

Game reference

Eric Schierhorn (1–0–0)
Goalies
Daniel Muff (0–1–0)
Referees:
Alex Cote
Colin Watts
Linesmen:
Ryan Gibbons
Ryan Lundquist

J. Snivley (1) (M. Reinke, A. Angello – 11:13	1–0
T. Novak (1) (M. Reinke) – 15:31	2–0
A. Oglevie (1) (A. Angello, J. Snivley) – 26:41	3–0
S. Gersich (1) (B. Hillman) – 28:25	4–0
B. Boeser (1) (T. Sheehy, T. Novak) – 34:11	5–0
A. Oglevie (2) (A. Angello) – 42:41	6–0
A. Angello (1) (M. Bergh, A. Oglevie) (PP) – 53:31	7–0

4 min
Penalties
14 min
54
Shots
26

16 December 2014; 15:30	Canada East	2–3 (1–1, 0–0, 1–2)	United States	West Central Events Centre

Game reference

Blade Mann-Dixon (0–1–1)
Goalies
Cale Morris (1–0–0)

	0–1	11:24 – B. Boeser (2) (K. Connor) (PP)
L. Batt (2) (Z. Tierney, A. Brady) (PP) – 15:27	1–1
Z. Tierney (1) (R. Kirkup) – 55:07	2–1
	2–2	58:29 – S. Malone (1) (C. Wolanin, B. Nardella)
	2–3	59:58 – S. Gersich (2) (B. Nardella, C. Wolanin)

10 min
Penalties
14 min
28
Shots
46

==== Group B ====
Team	Pld	W	OTW	OTL	L	GF	GA	GD	Pts
Denmark	2	2	0	0	0	7	4	+3	6
Canada West	2	0	1	0	1	5	5	0	2
Russia	2	0	0	1	1	4	7	−3	1

14 December 2014; 19:30	Denmark	3–2 (1–0, 1–1, 1–1)	Canada West	West Central Events Centre

Game reference

Thomas Lillie (1–0–0)
Goalies
Tommy Nixon (0–1–0)

M. Aagaard (1) (M. Aserup, E. Rasmussen) – 18:24	1–0
N. Ehlers (1) (O. Bjorkstrand) (PP) – 23:20	2–0
	2–1	25:47 – G. Bast (1) (D. Fabbro, R. Risling) (PP)
	2–2	47:08 – T. Jost (1) (PP)
N. Ehlers (2) (M. Eller) (PP) – 57:00	3–2

12 min
Penalties
12 min
25
Shots
33

15 December 2014; 15:30	Russia	2–4 (1–1, 0–0, 1–3)	Denmark	West Central Events Centre

Game reference

Ilya Samsonov (0–1–0)
Goalies
George Sørensen (1–0–0)
Referees:
Fraser Lawrence
Chad Williams
Linesmen:
Troy Murray
Sean Donnelly

M. Vorobyev (1) (D. Guryanov, V. Barabanov) – 7:02	1–0
	1–1	19:59 – N. Ehlers (3) (M. Lassen) (SH)
	1–2	42:31 – N. Ehlers (4) (M. Asperup, M. Nielsen) (PP)
D. Guryanov (1) (A. Kozyrev, M. Vorobyev) – 47:25	2–2
	2–3	57:07 – N. Ehlers (5) (S. Hertzberg)
	2–4	59:05 – A. Krogsgaard (1) (SH)(EN)

6 min
Penalties
8 min
30
Shots
32

16 December 2014; 19:30	Canada West	3–2 GWS (1–0, 1–1, 0–1) (OT: 0–0) (SO: 2–0)	Russia	West Central Events Centre

Game reference

Tommy Nixon (1–1–0)
Goalies
Anton Krasotkin (0–0–1)
Referees:
Colin Watt
Mike Campbell
Linesmen:
Tarrington Wyonzek
Ryan Gibbons

T. Jost (2) (V. Dombrovskiy) – 1:39	1–0
G. Bast (2) (T. Jost, D. Hannoun) – 23:53	2–0
	2–1	28:49 – D. Guryanov (2) (V. Barabanov, D. Zhukenov)
	2–2	43:37 – K. Kaprizov (1) (D. Zhukenov)

J. Keane
D. Hannoun (miss)
T. Jost
Shootout
V. Barabanov (miss)
M. Vorobyev (miss)
10 min
Penalties
8 min
46
Shots
34

=== Playoff round ===
Quarterfinals
3B	Russia	3
2A	Switzerland	2
3A	Canada East	4
2B	Canada West	2

Semi-Finals
3B	Russia	1
1B	Denmark	5
3A	Canada East	1
1A	United States	7
5th Place
2A	Switzerland	3
2B	Canada West	2

Gold Medal
1A	United States	3
1B	Denmark	2
Bronze Medal
3B	Russia	2
3A	Canada East	0

==== Quarterfinals ====
17 December 2014; 15:30	Russia	3–2 (2–2, 1–0, 0–0)	Switzerland	West Central Events Centre

Game reference

Ilya Samsonov (2–0–0)
Goalies
Joren van Pottelberghe (1–1–0)
Referees:
Alex Cote
Fraser Lawrence
Linesmen:
Troy Murray
Tarrington Wyonzek

	0–1	3:52 – M. Holdener (1) (S. Weber, S. Forrer)
D. Zhukenov (1) – 7:48	1–1
N. Chebykin (1) – 16:46	2–1
	2–2	17:11 – A. Impose (1) (D. Riat)
N. Chebykin (2) – 26:38	3–2

4 min
Penalties
10 min
37
Shots
27

17 December 2014; 19:30	Canada East	4–2 (1–1, 1–1, 2–0)	Canada West	West Central Events Centre

Game reference

Blade Mason-Dixon (1–1–1)
Goalies
Tommy Nixon (1–2–0)

	0–1	14:15 – R. Gardner (1) (T. Busch, M. Vela
R. Kuffner (1) (M. Laidley) – 15:52	1–1
A. Girduckis (1) (M. St. Pierre, R. Garvey) – 23:58	2–1
	2–2	35:27 – D. Fabbro (1) (M. Vela, R. Risling)
A. Tonge (1) (Z. Tierney) (PP) – 42:30	3–2
A. Girduckis (2) – 59:24	4–2

10 min
Penalties
6 min
24
Shots
40

==== Semi-finals ====
18 December 2014; 15:30	Russia	1–5 (0–1, 1–3, 0–1)	Denmark	West Central Events Centre

Game reference

Anton Krasotkin (0–1–1)
Goalies
George Sørensen (2–0–0)
Referees:
Colin Watt
Chad Williams
Linesmen:
Sean Donnelly
Tarrington Wyonzek

	0–1	2:58 – M. Asperup (1) (E. Rasmussen, M. Aagaard)
	0–2	23:07 – O. Bjorkstrand (1) (N. Ehlers)
	0–3	24:49 – N. Olesen (1) (M. Aagaard, S. Hertzberg)
Y. Rykov (1) (A. Volkov) – 30:42	1–3
	1–4	37:21 – J. Holmberg (1) (SH)
	1–5	59:40 – O. Bjorkstrand (2) (N. Ehlers, M. Lassen) (PP)

10 min
Penalties
10 min
26
Shots
38

18 December 2014; 19:30	Canada East	1–7 (1–5, 0–1, 0–1)	United States	West Central Events Centre

Game reference

Blade Mann-Dixon (1–2–1)
Goalies
Eric Schierhorn (2–0–0)
Referees:
Mike Campbell
Fraser Lawrence
Linesmen:
Ryan Lundquist
Troy Murray

	0–1	5:18 – T. Sheehy (1) (M. Bergh, R. Zuhlsdorf)
	0–2	6:16 – A. Angello (2) (D. Joshua)
	0–3	9:48 – T. Novak (2)
A. Tonge (2) (M. Laidley) – 13:48	1–3
	1–4	15:42 – J. Snivley (1) (D. Joshua)
	1–5	16:29 – K. Connor (1) (C. Wolanin, S. Gersich)
	1–6	28:16 – D. Gambrell (1) (T. Novak, C. Wolanin)
	1–7	57:32 – B Boeser (3) (R. Zuhlsdorf)

8 min
Penalties
6 min
23
Shots
47

==== 5th-place game ====
19 December 2014; 15:30	Switzerland	3–2 (0–0, 1–2, 2–0)	Canada West	West Central Events Centre

Game reference

Daniel Muff (1–1–0)
Goalies
Evan Weninger (0–1–0)
Referees:
Fraser Lawrence
Colin Watt
Linesmen:
Ryan Gibbons
Sean Donnelly

	0–1	31:48 – S. Rempal (1) (D. Fabbro, T. Busch)
	0–2	34:49 – S. Rempal (2) (J. Keane, C. Young)
R. Chuard (1) (R. Prassi) – 36:00	1–2
S. Forrer (1) (C. Thürkauf) (PP) – 47:10	2–2
T. Kessler (1) (C. Thürkauf) – 48:00	3–2

10 min
Penalties
14 min
20
Shots
26

==== Bronze-medal game ====
19 December 2014; 19:30	Russia	2–0 (1–0, 0–0, 1–0)	Canada East	West Central Events Centre

Game reference
Ilya Samsonov (3–0–0)	Goalies	Blade Mann-Dixon (1–3–1)
K. Kaprizov (2) (D. Zhukenov, N. Chebykin) – 3:42 / 1–0; D. Guryanov (3) (A. Shemrov, Y. Rykov) – 53:37 / 2–0
6 min	Penalties	10 min
29	Shots	46

==== Gold-medal game ====
20 December 2014; 15:30	United States	3–2 OT (0–1, 1–0, 1–1) (OT: 1–0)	Denmark	West Central Events Centre

Game reference

Eric Schierhorn (3–0–0)
Goalies
George Sørensen (2–0–1)
Referees:
Mike Campbell
Fraser Lawrence
Linesmen:
Ryan Gibbons
Ryan Lundquist

	0–1	0:33 – N. Ehlers (6) (O. Bjorkstrand)
B. Boeser (4) (T. Novak, T. Sheehy) (PP) – 31:33	1–1
M. Bergh (1) (B. Boeser, T. Novak) (PP) – 58:17	2–1
	2–2	45:46 – O. Bjorkstrand (3) (N. Ehlers, M. Asperup)
T. Novak (3) (PP) – 64:56	3–2

8 min
Penalties
18 min
63
Shots
24

=== Final standings ===
	Team
1st place, gold medalist(s)	United States
2nd place, silver medalist(s)	Denmark
3rd place, bronze medalist(s)	Russia
4th	Canada East
5th	Switzerland
6th	Canada West

== Statistics ==
Scoring leaders
Player	Team	GP	G	A	P	PIM
Nikolaj Ehlers	Denmark	4	6	3	9	4
Thomas Novak	United States	4	3	4	7	0
Brock Boeser	United States	4	4	1	5	6
Anthony Angello	United States	4	2	3	5	0
Oliver Bjorkstrand	Denmark	4	3	2	5	2
Christian Wolanin	United States	4	0	4	4	4
Matthias Asperup	Denmark	4	1	3	4	0
Denis Guryanov	Russia	5	3	1	4	2
Dmitri Zhukenov	Russia	5	1	3	4	4
Zac Tierney	Canada East	5	1	2	3	2

Top goaltenders
Player	Team	GP	Mins	GA	SO	GAA	Sv%	Record
Eric Schierhorn	United States	3	184:56	3	1	0.97	.959	3–0–0
Ilya Samsonov	Russia	3	179:27	5	1	1.67	.952	2–1–0
George Sørensen	Denmark	3	184:56	6	0	1.95	.950	2–1–0
Cale Morris	United States	2	60:00	2	0	2.00	.929	1–0–0
Thomas Lillie	Denmark	1	60:00	2	0	2.00	.939	1–0–0

== Awards ==
Most Valuable Player: Nikolaj Ehlers Denmark

All-Star Team

Forwards: Nikolaj Ehlers Denmark, Denis Guryanov Russia, Thomas Novak United States
Defense: Callum Fryer Canada East, Christian Wolanin United States
Goalie: Eric Schierhorn United States
