= Brocks =

Brocks may refer to:

- Brocks Fireworks, English manufacturer of fireworks
- Brocks Gap, water gap in Rockingham County, Virginia
- Brocks Peak, the sharp rocky peak in Ellsworth Mountains, Antarctica

== People ==
- Hendrik Brocks (born 1942), Indonesian cyclist
- Karl Brocks (1912–1972), German meteorologist and Hauptmann during World War II

== See also ==
- Broks, surname
- Brock (disambiguation)
- Townes–Brocks syndrome, rare genetic disease
