= Brock (given name) =

Brock is a given name.

== Notable people with the given name "Brock" include ==
=== A ===
- Brock Adams (1927–2004), American politician
- Brock Anderson (born 1997), American professional wrestler
- Brock Aynsley (born 1950), Canadian football player

=== B ===
- Brock Batty (born 2007), Australian gymnast
- Brock Berlin (born 1981), American football player
- Brock Bierman, American civil servant
- Brock Blake, American entrepreneur
- Brock Blomberg (born 1967), American economist
- Brock Boeser (born 1997), American ice hockey player
- Brock Bolen (born 1985), American football player
- Brock Bond (born 1985), American baseball player
- Brock Bowers (born 2002), American football player
- Brock Boyle (born 1982), Canadian lacrosse player
- Brock Norman Brock (born 1966), British screenwriter
- Brock Brower (1931–2014), American novelist
- Brock Burke (born 1996), American football player

=== C ===
- Brock Chisholm (1896–1971), Canadian psychiatrist
- Brock Clarke (born 1968), American novelist
- Brock Cole (born 1938), American author
- Brock Colvin (born 1995), American politician
- Brock Colyar, American journalist
- Brock Coyle (born 1990), American football player
- Brock Cripps (born 2009), Canadian ice hockey player

=== D ===
- Brock Davis (born 1943), American baseball player
- Brock Dykxhoorn (born 1994), Canadian baseball player

=== E ===
- Brock Elbank, English photographer
- Brock Enright (born 1976), American artist

=== F ===
- Brock Faber (born 2002), American ice hockey player
- Brock Forsey (born 1980), American football player

=== G ===
- Brock Gill (born 1975), American stunt artist
- Brock Gillespie (born 1983), American basketball player
- Brock Glenn, American football player
- Brock Gowanlock (born 1996), Canadian American football player
- Brock Granger (born 1991), American soccer player
- Brock Greacen (born 2002), Australian rugby league footballer
- Brock Greenfield (born 1975), American politician
- Brock Gutierrez (born 1973), American football player

=== H ===
- Brock Heger (born 2000), American racing driver
- Brock Hekking (born 1991), American football player
- Brock Hoffman (born 1999), American football player
- Brock Holt (born 1988), American baseball player
- Brock Huard (born 1976), American football player
- Brock Huntzinger (born 1988), American baseball player

=== I ===
- Brock Ingram (born 1977), Australian Paralympic kayaker and rower

=== J ===
- Brock Jackley (born 1947), American politician
- Brock James (born 1981), Australian rugby union footballer
- Brock Jensen (born 1990), American football player
- Brock Jones (born 2001), American baseball player

=== K ===
- Brock Kjeldgaard (born 1986), Canadian baseball player
- Brock Kreitzburg (born 1976), American bobsledder

=== L ===
- Brock Lamb (born 1997), Australian rugby league footballer
- Brock Lampe (born 2003), American football player
- Brock Larson (born 1977), American mixed martial artist
- Brock Lesnar (born 1977), American professional wrestler
- Brock Long (born 1975), American civil servant

=== M ===
- Brock Marion (born 1970), American football player
- Brock Martin (born 1984), American politician
- Brock Matheson (born 1987), Canadian ice hockey player
- Brock McElheran (1918–2008), Canadian conductor
- Brock McGillis (born 1983), Canadian ice hockey player
- Brock McGinn (born 1994), Canadian ice hockey player
- Brock McLean (born 1986), Australian rules footballer
- Brock McPherson (born 1985), Canadian ice hockey player
- Brock Meeks (born 1956), American journalist
- Brock Miller (born 1991), American football player
- Brock Miron (born 1980), Canadian speed skater
- Brock Mogensen (born 2000), American football player
- Brock Motum (born 1990), Australian basketball player
- Brock Mueller (born 1978), Australian rugby league footballer

=== N ===
- Brock Nelson (born 1991), American ice hockey player

=== O ===
- Brock O'Brien (born 1988), Australian rules footballer
- Brock O'Hurn (born 1991), American model
- Brock Olivo (born 1976), American football player
- Brock Osweiler (born 1990), American football player

=== P ===
- Brock Parker (born 1981), American poker player
- Brock Pemberton (1885–1950), American theatre director
- Brock Pemberton (baseball) (1953–2016), American baseball player
- Brock Peters (1927–2005), American actor
- Brock Peterson (born 1983), American baseball player
- Brock Pierce (born 1980), American entrepreneur
- Brock Porter (born 2003), American baseball player
- Brock Purdy (born 1999), American football player

=== R ===
- Brock Radunske (born 1983), Canadian-South Korean ice hockey player
- Brock Ralph (born 1980), Canadian football player
- Brock Rechsteiner (born 2002), American football player
- Brock Riker (born 2006), American football player

=== S ===
- Brock Sheahan (born 1984), Canadian ice hockey coach
- Brock Spack (born 1962), American football coach
- Brock Speer (1920–1999), American singer
- Brock Staller (born 1992), Canadian rugby union footballer
- Brock Stassi (born 1989), American football player
- Brock Stewart (born 1991), American baseball player
- Brock Strom (born 1934), American football player
- Brock Sunderland (born 1979), American football player

=== T ===
- Brock Tessman (born 1976), American academic
- Brock Tredway (born 1959), Canadian ice hockey player
- Brock Trotter (born 1987), Canadian ice hockey player
- Brock Turner (born 1995), American convicted rapist

=== U ===
- Brock Ungricht (born 1984), American baseball coach

=== V ===
- Brock Vandagriff (born 2002), American football player
- Brock Vereen (born 1992), American football player
- Brock Virtue (born 1986), Canadian curler

=== W ===
- Brock Webster (born 2000), Canadian rugby union footballer
- Brock Whiston (born 1996), British Paralympic swimmer
- Brock Wilken (born 2002), American baseball player
- Brock Williams (born 1979), American football player
- Brock Williams (screenwriter) (1894–1964), English screenwriter
- Brock Winkless (1959–2015), American puppeteer
- Brock Wright (born 1998), American football player

=== Y ===
- Brock Yates (1933–2016), American journalist and author

=== Z ===
- Brock Zeman (born 1981), Canadian singer-songwriter

== See also ==
- Brock (disambiguation), a disambiguation page for "Brock"
- Brock (surname), a page for people with the surname "Brock"
