= Broks =

Broks (feminine (Latvian): Broka). is a surname. Notable people with the surname include:

- Paul Broks, English neuropsychologist and science writer
- Raivis Broks (born 1984), Latvian bobsledder
- Rolands Broks (born 1969), Latvian politician
- Stef Broks (born 1981), Dutch drummer

== See also ==
- Brok (disambiguation)
- Brocks (disambiguation)
