= Chebykin =

Chebykin (masculine, Russian: Чебыкин) or Chebykina (feminine, Russian: Чебыкина) is a Russian surname. Notable people with the surname include:

- Nikolai Chebykin (born 1997), Russian ice hockey player
- Tatyana Chebykina (born 1968), Russian sprinter
