= Tatjana Koķe =

Latvian politician (born 1955)

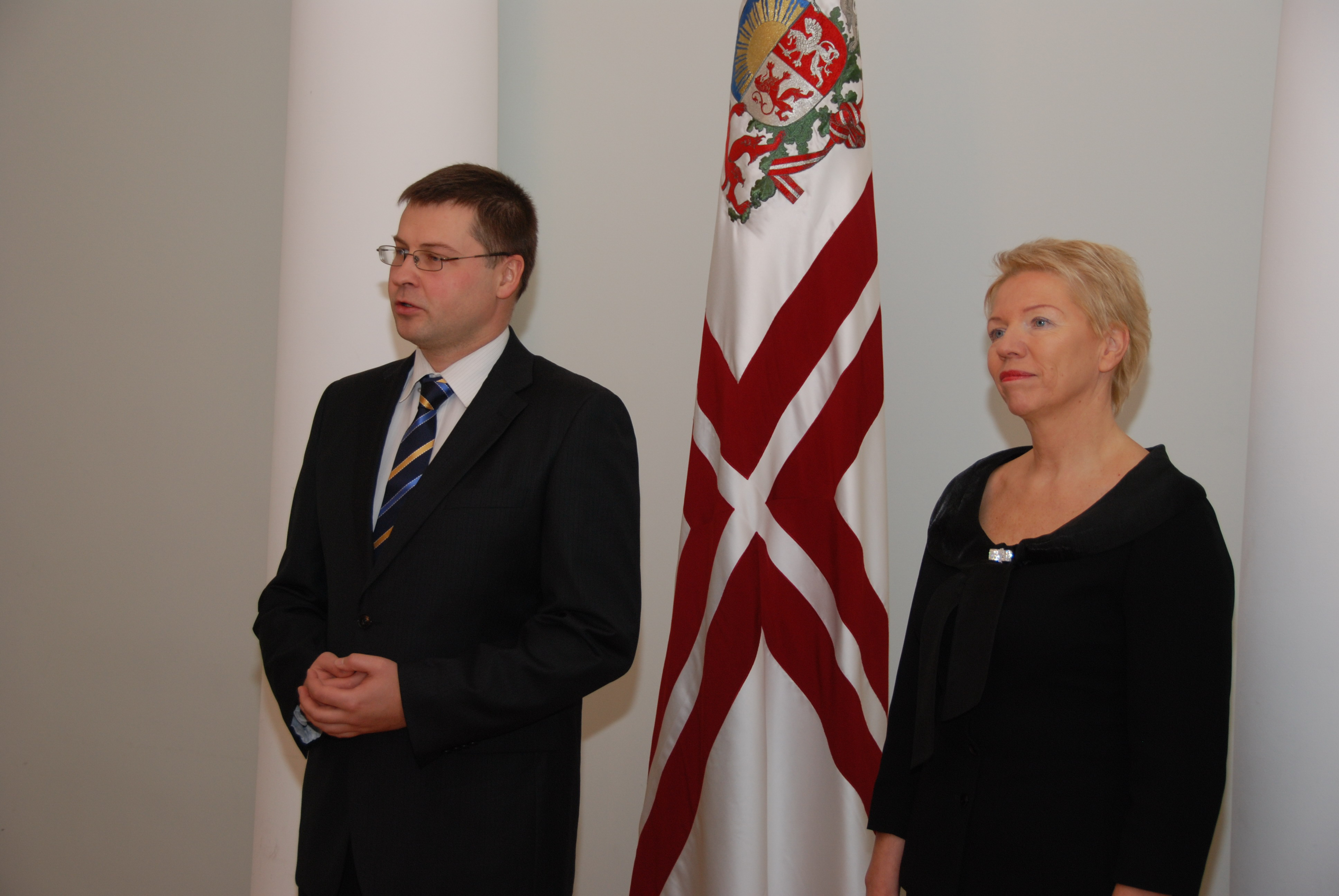

Minister of Education and Science of Latvia
- In office 20 December 2007 – 3 November 2010
- Preceded by: Baiba Rivža
- Succeeded by: Rolands Broks

Personal details
- Born: 9 May 1955 (age 71) Riga, Latvian SSR
- Party: Latvian Farmers' Union
- Education: University of Latvia

Tatjana Koķe (born 9 May 1955, Riga, Latvia) is a Latvian politician of the Latvian Farmers' Union party and was Minister of Education and Science of Latvia from 20 December 2007 to 3 November 2010.
