= Brock =

Brock may refer to:

== Businesses ==
- Brock Motors, a short-lived automotive company founded in 1921 in Amherstberg, Ontario
- Crowne Plaza Niagara Falls – Fallsview also known as the Brock Hotel, a hotel in Niagara Falls, Ontario
- Brock Hotel Corporation, founded by Robert L. Brock

== People ==
- Brock (surname), various people with this surname
- Brock (given name), various people with this given name

=== Fictional characters ===
- Brock (Pokémon), a character and the Gym Leader of Pewter City in the fictional world of Pokémon, and one of the main characters in the Pokémon anime
- The Brocks, a family on the American television show Picket Fences
- Eddie Brock, the longtime host of the Marvel alien symbiote Venom
- John Brock, a fictional British undercover agent created by Desmond Skirrow
- Matthew Brock, a news reporter on the American sitcom NewsRadio
- Brock Leighton, a character in the TV series Braceface
- Brock Lovett, a character in the 1997 film Titanic
- Tommy Brock the badger from The Tale of Mr. Tod by Beatrix Potter
- Brock Cantillo, on Breaking Bad the son of character Andrea Cantillo
- Brock Samson, a character in the animated television series The Venture Bros.
- Brock, a character in the TV series Unikitty!

== Places ==
=== In Canada ===
- Brock, Ontario, a township
- Brock, Saskatchewan, a village
- Rural Municipality of Brock No. 64, Saskatchewan
- Brock Island, a Canadian arctic island in the Northwest Territories

=== In England ===
- Brock, a small village in Myerscough and Bilsborrow parish, Lancashire
- River Brock, a river in Lancashire

=== In the United States ===
- Brock, Missouri, an unincorporated community
- Brock, Nebraska, a village
- Brock, Ohio, an unincorporated community
- Brock, Texas, an unincorporated community

== Schools ==
- Brock University, a comprehensive university located in St. Catharines, Ontario, Canada
- Brock High School (Ontario), a high school in Brock, Ontario
- Brock High School (Texas), a high school in Brock, Texas

== Ships ==
- HMS Sir Isaac Brock, a British naval vessel destroyed at the Battle of York prior to being completed
- USS Brock (APD-93), a United States Navy high-speed transport in commission from 1945 to 1947

== Other uses ==
- Brock, a traditional name for a European badger
- Team Brock (disambiguation), a series of Australian motor racing teams
- Brock (miniseries), an Australian mini-series based on the life of motor racing driver Peter Brock
- Operation Brock, a Brexit traffic management plan

== See also ==
- Brock River (disambiguation)
- Broc (disambiguation)
- Brok (disambiguation)
