= Blake Hillman =

American ice hockey player (born 1996)

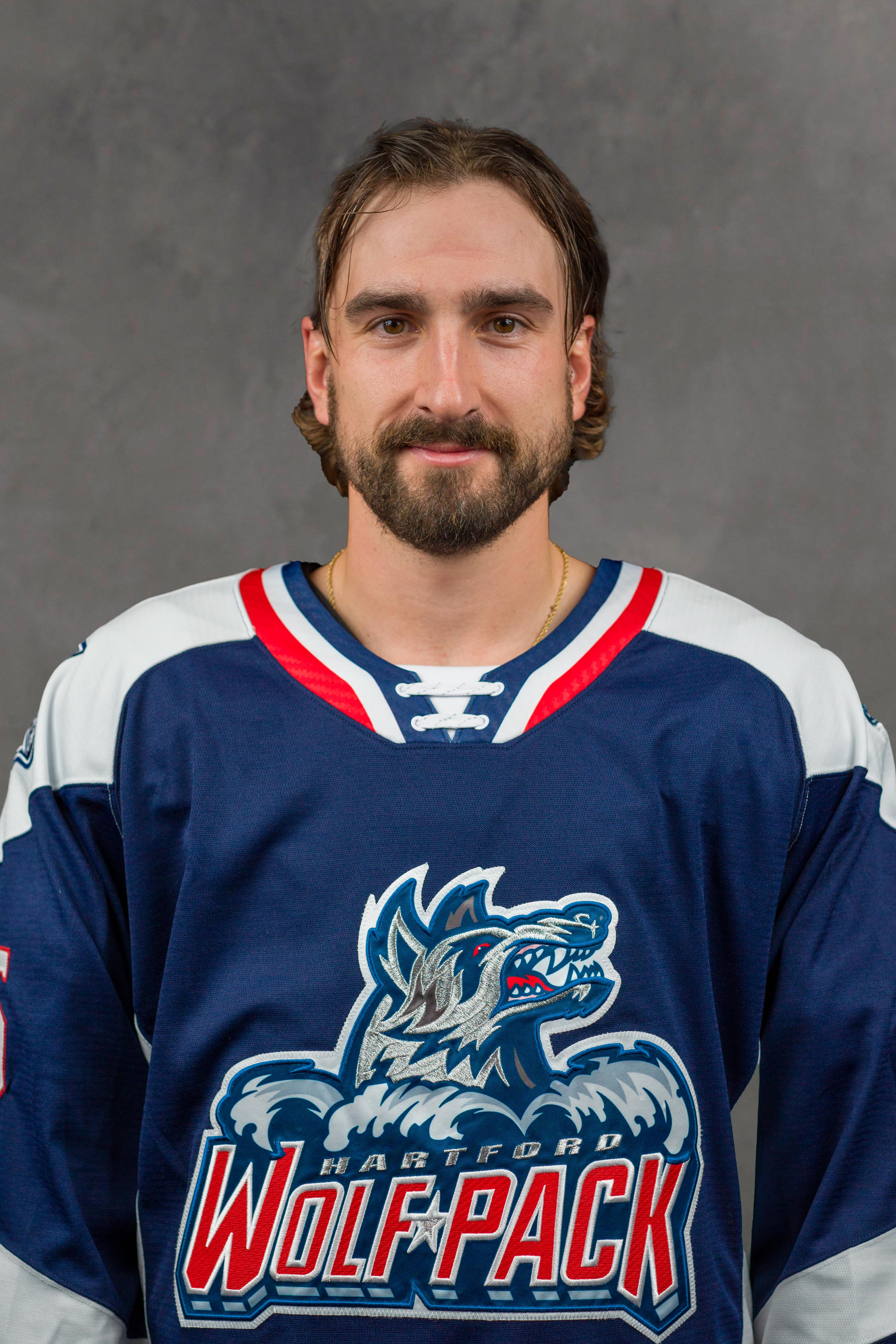
- Hillman with the Hartford Wolf Pack
- Born: January 26, 1996 (age 30) Elk River, Minnesota, U.S.
- Height: 6 ft 1 in (185 cm)
- Weight: 182 lb (83 kg; 13 st 0 lb)
- Position: Defense
- Shoots: Left
- ICEHL team Former teams: HC Bolzano; Chicago Blackhawks
- NHL draft: 173rd overall, 2016; Chicago Blackhawks
- Playing career: 2018–present

Blake Hillman (born January 26, 1996) is an American professional ice hockey defenseman for HC Bolzano in the ICE Hockey League (ICEHL). Hillman was drafted by the Chicago Blackhawks in the sixth round, 173rd overall, in the 2016 NHL entry draft.

== Playing career ==
Hillman played two seasons in the USHL with the Dubuque Fighting Saints and Waterloo Black Hawks, before attending the University of Denver. Hillman played three years at the University of Denver where he was a member of the 2017 NCAA Champion Denver Pioneers. Hillman was drafted in the sixth round, 173rd overall, in the 2016 NHL entry draft.

At the end of his junior year, Hillman signed a two-year entry-level contract with the Blackhawks on March 27, 2018, and made his NHL debut on March 30, 2018, in a game between the Blackhawks and the Colorado Avalanche. Hillman recorded his first career NHL goal on April 4, 2018, in a game against the St. Louis Blues, to help the Blackhawks win 4–3.

As an impending restricted free agent, Hillman was not tendered a qualifying offer by the Blackhawks, releasing him as a free agent on June 25, 2019. With limited interest from NHL/AHL clubs, Hillman signed a one-year contract with the Toledo Walleye of the ECHL on July 26, 2019. In the 2019–20 season, Hillman contributed with 13 points through 35 regular season games with the Walleye, while also leaving on loan on two occasions by signing two tryout contracts in the AHL with the Grand Rapids Griffins and Stockton Heat.

On January 20, 2021, Hillman extended his professional career by signing with the South Carolina Stingrays of the ECHL for the 2020–21 season.

Following the 2021–22 season, having played with the Toledo Walleye in the ECHL and the Grand Rapids Griffins, Providence Bruins in the AHL, Hillman was signed to a one-year AHL contract with the Hartford Wolf Pack on July 6, 2022.

After four seasons with the Wolf Pack, Hillman opted to sign his first European contract in agreeing to a one-year deal with Italian club, HC Bolzano of the ICEHL, on July 20, 2026.

== International play ==
Hillman represented Team USA at the 2014 World Junior A Challenge where he helped Team USA win their 6th gold medal.

== Career statistics ==
			Regular season					Playoffs
Season	Team	League	GP	G	A	Pts	PIM	GP	G	A	Pts	PIM
2011–12	Elk River High	USHS	25	2	4	6	8	2	0	0	0	0
2012–13	Elk River High	USHS	24	2	12	14	8	2	0	2	2	2
2013–14	Dubuque Fighting Saints	USHL	57	3	10	13	24	7	0	0	0	0
2014–15	Dubuque Fighting Saints	USHL	42	3	8	11	12	—	—	—	—	—
2014–15	Waterloo Black Hawks	USHL	13	0	7	7	6	—	—	—	—	—
2015–16	University of Denver	NCHC	39	3	8	11	14	—	—	—	—	—
2016–17	University of Denver	NCHC	43	1	7	8	18	—	—	—	—	—
2017–18	University of Denver	NCHC	41	3	9	12	52	—	—	—	—	—
2017–18	Chicago Blackhawks	NHL	4	1	0	1	0	—	—	—	—	—
2018–19	Rockford IceHogs	AHL	54	1	3	4	20	—	—	—	—	—
2019–20	Toledo Walleye	ECHL	35	1	12	13	8	—	—	—	—	—
2019–20	Grand Rapids Griffins	AHL	5	0	1	1	4	—	—	—	—	—
2019–20	Stockton Heat	AHL	7	0	0	0	2	—	—	—	—	—
2020–21	South Carolina Stingrays	ECHL	43	3	8	11	12	12	0	1	1	2
2021–22	Toledo Walleye	ECHL	13	2	11	13	2	13	1	6	7	6
2021–22	Grand Rapids Griffins	AHL	10	0	2	2	2	—	—	—	—	—
2021–22	Providence Bruins	AHL	20	0	7	7	6	1	0	0	0	0
2022–23	Hartford Wolf Pack	AHL	29	0	5	5	14	7	2	2	4	2
2023–24	Hartford Wolf Pack	AHL	60	4	11	16	6	10	1	2	3	2
2024–25	Hartford Wolf Pack	AHL	50	3	7	10	12	—	—	—	—	—
2025–26	Hartford Wolf Pack	AHL	40	2	6	8	2	—	—	—	—	—
NHL totals			4	1	0	1	0	—	—	—	—	—
