= Nikolaj Ehlers =

Danish ice hockey player (born 1996)

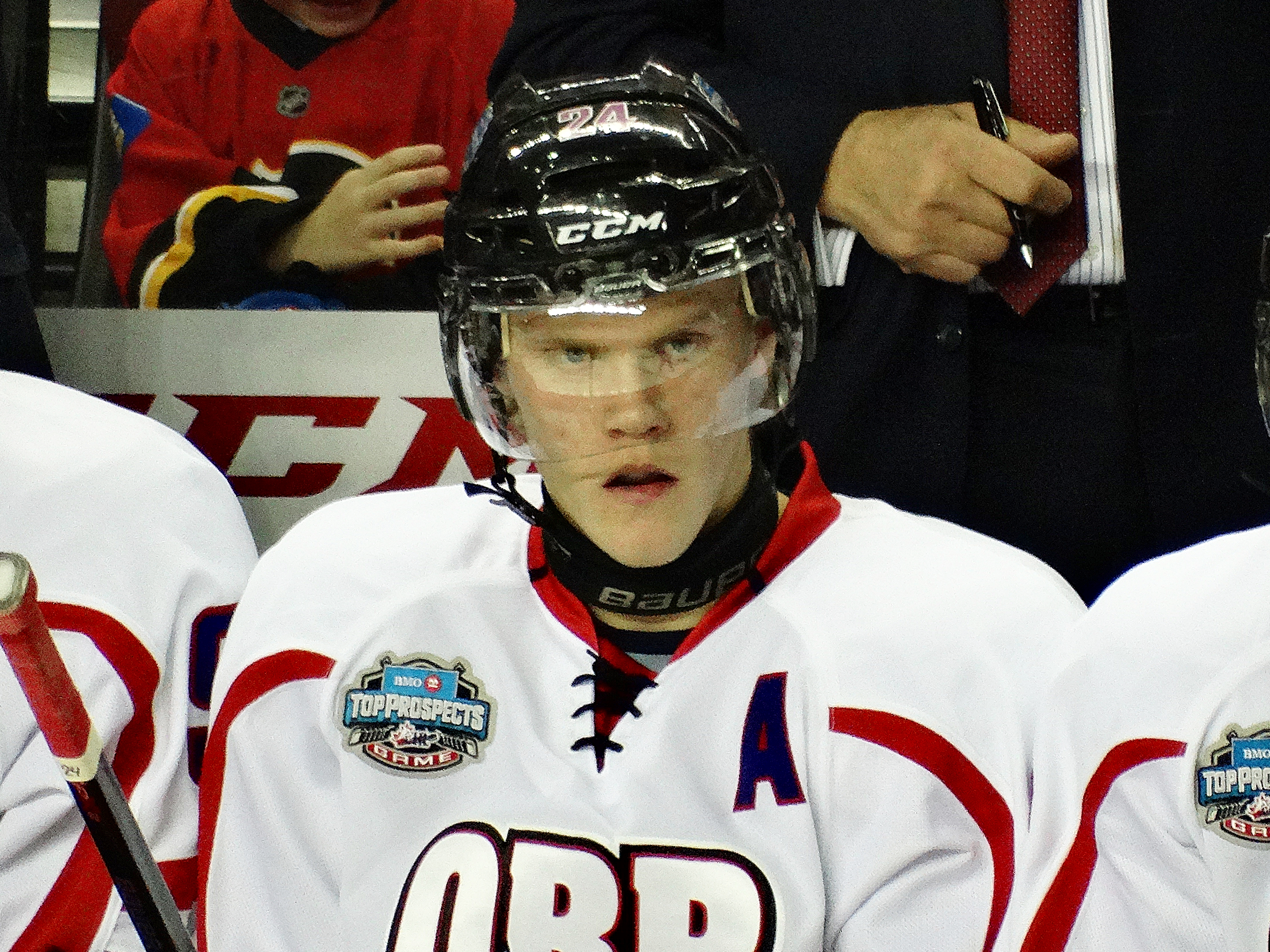
- Ehlers in 2014
- Born: 14 February 1996 (age 30) Aalborg, Denmark
- Height: 6 ft 0 in (183 cm)
- Weight: 168 lb (76 kg; 12 st 0 lb)
- Position: Winger
- Shoots: Left
- NHL team Former teams: Carolina Hurricanes; EHC Biel; Winnipeg Jets
- National team: Denmark
- NHL draft: 9th overall, 2014; Winnipeg Jets
- Playing career: 2015–present

Nikolaj Ehlers (Danish pronunciation: [ˈnikolɑi ˈiːlɐs]; born 14 February 1996) is a Danish professional ice hockey player who is a winger for the Carolina Hurricanes of the National Hockey League (NHL). Ehlers previously played ice hockey in Switzerland, where his father Heinz was a coach, and then moved to North America in 2013 to play with the Halifax Mooseheads of the Quebec Major Junior Hockey League (QMJHL). After one year with Halifax he was selected ninth overall by the Winnipeg Jets in the 2014 NHL entry draft, and spent one more season in juniors before making the NHL in 2015. Ehlers won the Stanley Cup with the Hurricanes in 2026.

Internationally, Ehlers has played for Denmark at both the junior and senior level, including at three World Championships. He is affectionately nicknamed as "Fly", and "The Danish Dash", due to his elite, and fast accelerating skating speed.

== Playing career ==
=== Switzerland ===
Ehlers played youth and junior hockey in Switzerland within the EHC Biel organization. He played in the 2009 Quebec International Pee-Wee Hockey Tournament with the Swiss Eastern team. He made his National League A debut at age 16 (and was thus the youngest player in the league at the time), playing with the senior EHC Biel squad during the 2012–13 NLA season, one which he predominantly spent playing with the U20 team. As a result of the 2012–13 NHL lockout, Ehlers gained Patrick Kane and Tyler Seguin as his linemates with Biel. He later reflected that the two NHL players played a large role in convincing him to come to Canada and play for their junior teams, where he found much success.

=== Major junior ===
His play in Switzerland earned him attention in North America and he was eventually drafted sixth overall by the Halifax Mooseheads in the 2013 CHL Import Draft. Prior to joining the Mooseheads, Ehlers spoke with fellow Danes Oliver Bjorkstrand and Mikkel Bødker to prepare himself for the change. Ehlers made an immediate impact in the CHL while starting off playing on a line with Brent Andrews and Andrew Ryan. Through the first 16 games of the season, Ehlers led all rookies with eight goals and nine assists. Although he had missed some games due to the 2014 World Junior Ice Hockey Championships, Ehlers continued to lead all rookies with 56 points through 38 games. As a result, he was ranked 22nd among North American skaters eligible for the 2014 NHL entry draft in the NHL Central Scouting Bureau's (CSS) mid-term rankings. He was also selected to participate in the CHL/NHL Top Prospects Game and was named an alternate captain for Team Orr. Through February and early March, Ehlers recorded three hat-tricks in consecutive games while also maintaining an eight game multi-point streak to accumulate 47 goals and 50 assists in 59 games. He finished his rookie season on a 14-game point streak and finished the regular season with 104 points in 63 games for the Mooseheads. As a result of his outstanding rookie season, Ehlers received the RDS Cup as Rookie of the Year and Michael Bossy Trophy as the QMJHL's Top Prospect. He was also named to the QMJHL's Second All-Star Team and Rookie All-Star Team.

Ahead of the 2014 NHL entry draft, Ehlers was ranked 13th among North American skaters by the CSS and 10th by Bob McKenzie of The Sports Network. He also earned high rankings from Corey Pronman of ESPN for his skating, puck handling, and playmaking. Leading up to the draft, NHL Director of Central Scouting Dan Marr also praised Ehlers quickness and playmaking abilities. When speaking of Ehlers, Marr said: "He's proven to be a skilled forward who can work some magic. He's got that quickness where he can separate from a check and get to the net. He's got soft hands and passes with authority, is a clever playmaker and very unselfish. Most teams are viewing him as a first-round candidate." Ehlers was eventually drafted in the first round, ninth overall, by the Winnipeg Jets.

Following the draft, Ehlers was encouraged by the Jets' coaching staff to add weight and muscle ahead of the 2014–15 season as he weighed only 163 pounds. On 2 September, Ehlers signed a three-year entry-level contract with the Jets with an annual average value of $1.625 million. Following the signing, he then participated in the 2014 Young Stars Classic where he notched four points in the two games, including the game-winner. Ehlers played in six preseason games with the Jets, scoring one goal and two assists, before returning to the Mooseheads for the 2014–15 season. Upon rejoining the Mooseheads, Ehlers was named an alternate captain alongside Austyn Hardie and captain Ryan Falkenham. In this new role, Ehlers immediately returned to his rookie-year form and recorded 32 points throughout 11 games in November. In this time span, he also recorded five goals and eight assists over three games and was subsequently honoured with the CHL Player of the Week ending on 30 November. In December, Ehlers again missed time to represent Denmark at the 2015 World Junior Ice Hockey Championships. In his first game back from the tournament, Ehlers recorded four points to lead the Mooseheads 6–3 over the Gatineau Olympiques on 9 January 2015. He continued to collect points through January and February to best Jonathan Drouin's 29 game points-streak record set in 2012–13. On 17 February, Ehlers tallied two assists to maintain a points streak of 30 games dating back to 29 October. He also became the fourth player since 2000 to have a streak of 30 games, joining Radim Vrbata, Sidney Crosby, and Alexander Radulov. Ehlers earned his second CHL Player of the Week honour on 10 March after he recorded five goals and seven assists for 12 points over three games against the Acadie-Bathurst Titan, Charlottetown Islanders, and Cape Breton Screaming Eagles. Ehlers finished his sophomore season with 37 goals and 64 assists for 101 points through 51 games. He was nominated for two awards, including the Michel Brière Memorial Trophy as the League's Most Valuable Player, but ultimately only won the Paul Dumont Trophy as the QMJHL's "Personality of the Year." He was also named to the QMJHL's First All-Star Team for the first time in his career.

Following another successful season, Ehlers and the Mooseheads qualified for the 2015 President's Cup playoffs where they met with the Shawinigan Cataractes in the first round. Ehlers scored the series-winning goal in overtime of game 7 to lift the Mooseheads to the second round. In game 1 of their second-round series against the Moncton Wildcats, Ehlers recorded four goals and an assist to help the Mooseheads take a 1–0 series lead. He finished the postseason with 31 points over 14 playoff games.

=== Professional ===
==== Winnipeg Jets (2015–2025) ====
Following the conclusion of his junior career, Ehlers spent the summer bulking up and joined the Jets' training camp 15 pounds heavier. Although this was recommended by the Jets' coaching staff, Ehlers stated that he was not used to skating at such a heavy weight and was still adjusting. At the age of 19, he was the youngest player on the Jets' opening night roster against the Boston Bruins. He subsequently made his NHL debut on 8 October 2015 as the team's second line winger alongside Mark Scheifele and Mathieu Perreault. Although he did not record a point, the Jets beat the Bruins 6–2. In his first four games with the Jets, Ehlers tallied three points including his first career NHL goal against the New York Rangers on 13 October. From there however, Ehlers struggled to maintain consistency in his scoring. Along with experiencing a 15-game goalless drought, Ehlers tallied only five points in a 30-game stretch from 4 November to 10 January. His game became more consistent throughout January and he recorded his first career NHL hat-trick on 26 January 2016 against the Arizona Coyotes. He became the second teenager in Jets/Atlanta Thrashers history to record a three-goal game. By 4 March, Ehlers had accumulated 13 goals and 31 points through 63 games before suffering an eye injury during an overtime loss against the New York Islanders. He missed numerous weeks to recover before returning to the Jets' lineup on 24 March to help them beat the Los Angeles Kings 4–1. Despite missing time to recover, Ehlers was one of eight players on the roster that played over 10 games and finished over 50 per cent in shot attempts. He finished his rookie season with 15 goals and 23 assists for 38 points. Part of his success came from playing on a line with Scheifele and Blake Wheeler, as the trio combined for 61 points over 26 games.

Ehlers returned to the Jets for the 2016–17 season and reunited with Scheifele on the Jets' top line along with rookie Patrik Laine. He began the season slowly, tallying only four goals over his first 15 games of the season, but began gaining momentum in early November. Ehlers quickly accumulated 12 points by 10 November while his line combined for 26 points over four games. Despite experiencing a lengthy scoring drought shortly thereafter, Ehlers finished the month of November with 16 points over 14 games. He eventually snapped his 15-game goalless drought on 11 December in a 6–2 loss to the Calgary Flames. Upon snapping his drought, Ehlers tallied three goals over the next four games. After playing the remainder of 2016 with Scheifele and Laine, Ehlers produced at nearly a point per-game and accumulated 31 points over 39 games while ranking eighth in the NHL with 25 even-strength points. He continued to improve throughout January despite losing Laine due to injury and gaining veteran Drew Stafford as the top line's replacement winger. Prior to Laine's injury, the trio had combined for 52 goals and 110 points while Ehlers had individually accumulated 14 goals and 22 assists for 36 points. Once Laine returned from injury, the trio continued to develop their chemistry and they were three of four Jets players to score more than 60 points in the 2016–17 season. On 1 April, Ehlers tallied his 100th career NHL point in his 151st NHL game to help the Jets beat the Ottawa Senators. Although the team failed to qualify for the 2017 Stanley Cup playoffs, Ehlers set new career highs with 25 goals and 39 assists for 64 points while his linemates also set new records.

Following his breakout sophomore season, Ehlers signed a seven-year contract extension with the Jets worth an average annual value of $6.0 million. After the Jets maintained a 0–2 record to start the 2017–18 season, Ehlers was reunited with Scheifele and Wheeler on the Jets' top line. Upon their reunion, Ehlers tallied his second career hat-trick to lift the Jets 5–3 over the Edmonton Oilers. He continued to produce points over the Jets' next two games against the Vancouver Canucks and Carolina Hurricanes to lead them to three consecutive wins. He finished the week with five goals and seven points to lead the team in scoring and tie for fourth in the league among goal scorers. Ehlers subsequently received his NHL's First Star of the Week honour for his contributions. By mid-October, Ehlers had accumulated eight points and shared the Jets' scoring lead with Scheifele and Wheeler. However, Ehlers soon experienced an eight game scoring drought that was snapped during a 4–1 win over the Anaheim Ducks on 24 November. While playing on the Jets' second line with Bryan Little and Laine, the trio combined for seven points in the win, with Ehlers and Little getting three each. After scoring a goal on 19 December, Ehlers then experienced another eight game scoring drought that was snapped on 9 January against the Buffalo Sabres. During the drought, he was moved from left wing to right wing as head coach Paul Maurice adjusted the lineup in the absence of Scheifele. During Scheifele's six-week absence, Ehlers, Little and their new linemate Perreault ranked in the NHL's top 20 in shot attempt percentage. After head coach Paul Maurice acquired Paul Stastny at the trade deadline, Ehlers and Laine gained the centre as their new linemate. Ehlers subsequently recorded 14 more regular season points after Stastny's acquisition. Ehlers scored his career-high 29th goal of the season on 3 April to help the Jets become the 80th team in NHL history to hit the 50-win plateau in a single season. The Jets finished the regular season with a franchise record 114 points to qualify for the 2018 Stanley Cup playoffs. Ehlers was one of six players on the team to have scored over 40 points during the 2017–18 regular season.

Ehlers and the Jets faced off against the Minnesota Wild in the first round of the 2018 Stanley Cup playoffs. He was one of eight players to make his postseason debut during game 1. In his debut, Ehlers recorded an even-strength assist to help lift the Jets to their franchise's first playoff win. He tallied his second postseason assist the following game to extend the Jets' series lead. Although Ehlers missed Game Five against the Wild due to "general malaise," the Jets clinched their franchises first playoff series win. Ehlers eventually returned to the Jets' lineup for their second-round matchup against the Nashville Predators and reunited with Statsny and Laine. During their series against the Predators, the trio controlled 57.5 per cent of even-strength shot attempts and generated 69.2 per cent of the high-danger chances. While Ehlers continued to struggle to produce goals, he tallied two assists in game 5 to take a 3–2 series lead. Ehlers finished the Predators series with six total assists in the postseason as the Jets met with the Vegas Golden Knights in the Western Conference finals. He recorded three shots on goal in the Jets' 4–2 win in game 1, and added one more assist in game 2 before held out due to an injury. The Jets were eliminated from playoff contention before Ehlers could return to the lineup.

During the 2018 off-season, Ehlers added more muscle and returned to the Jets' training camp weighing 172 pounds. Following training camp, Ehlers was moved to the right wing position during the Jets' preseason games although he struggled with his skating. Ehlers' struggles continued into the 2018–19 regular season as he recorded no points and four shots on goal over three games while averaging 12:07 of ice time. He continued his presence on the Jets' second line but gained Bryan Little as his new centre while Laine often shifted between the first and second lines. His first goal of the season eventually came on 16 October, the Jets' sixth game of the season, in a 5–4 loss to the Edmonton Oilers. In spite of his early season struggles, Ehlers regained his chemistry with his linemate Laine and the two began producing points at a rapid pace. On 30 November, Ehlers recorded his third career hat-trick while also combining on two other goals to lead the Jets 6–5 over the Chicago Blackhawks. His second hat-trick came the following month on 21 December to lead the Jets 5–3 over the San Jose Sharks. On 4 January, during a game against the Pittsburgh Penguins, Ehlers suffered a major lower body injury following a collision with Sidney Crosby. At the time of the injury, Ehlers had accumulated 15 goals and 12 assists through the first 39 games of the season. While he recovered, Jack Roslovic replaced him on right wing on his line with Bryan Little and Laine. After missing 20 games to recover, Ehlers scored a goal in his return against the Golden Knights on 22 February 2019. Shortly following his return, the Jets acquired Kevin Hayes who centred Ehlers and Kyle Connor on the second line. The three immediately made an impact on the Jets' lineup and quickly combined for 14 points through their first five games together. This helped the Jets qualify for the 2019 Stanley Cup playoffs and make franchise history by qualifying for consecutive playoffs. Although Hayes finished the regular season with 13 points through 20 games, Ehlers and Laine both regressed in scoring and finished with low point totals. Ehlers finished with 21 goals and a career-low 16 assists for 37 points through 62 games while Laine concluded with 30 goals and 50 points. Ehlers and the Jets faced off against the St. Louis Blues in round one of the 2019 Stanley Cup playoffs but fell in six games. When their postseason concluded, it was revealed that Ehlers had fractured his leg after blocking a shot at the end of game 5.

To improve his disappointing season, Ehlers spent the 2019 off-season studying every single shift he took during the previous season to improve his scoring. Head coach Paul Maurice praised Ehlers improved play, lauding him for competing hard. He began the season strong while playing alongside Wheeler and Scheifele. In the teams' season opener, Ehlers tied his career-high with three assists while his line accounted for 21 of Winnipeg's 47 shots on net. He also skated in his 300th career NHL game that night. Ehlers continued to find success throughout October, including four multi-point performances over 13 games. During practice on 4 November, Ehlers accidentally hit teammate Bryan Little in the face with a puck which resulted in the latter being placed on long-term injured reserve. As a result, head coach Paul Maurice had to shuffle the forward lines and Ehlers gained Blake Wheeler as his centre along with Jack Roslovic. At the time, Elers led the Jets in goals with seven and ranked second on the team in points with 14. While playing on this line, Ehlers tallied his 100th career NHL goal on 19 November to help lift the Jets to their third straight win and a 13–8–1 record. He continued to find success as the season continued and quickly tallied five points over a four game point streak in early December. The line remained together through December before being rotated in January due to various injuries in the lineup. The line continued to be broken up throughout the second half of the season and Ehlers occasionally played alongside Wheeler, Scheifele, Cody Eakin, and Laine. When reunited with Wheeler and Scheifele on 18 February, the trio combined for eight points in the Jets' win over the Los Angeles Kings. While Ehlers and Laine played alongside Cody Eaking over the final eight games of the NHL's regular season, the trio combined for 14 points. When the NHL paused play due to the COVID-19 pandemic, Ehlers had hit the 20-goal plateau for the fourth straight season and finished with 52 points. When the NHL resumed play for the 2020 Stanley Cup playoffs, Ehlers was reunited with Eakin and Laine on the Jets' second line. During game 2 of their qualifying round series against the Calgary Flames, Ehlers recorded his first career postseason goal with 9:36 left in the third period. However, the Jets were ultimately eliminated by the Flames in the best-of-5 series.

Due to the COVID-19 pandemic, the 2020–21 season was shortened to 56 regular season games and started on 13 January 2021. Despite missing the last practice prior to opening night due to COVID-19 protocol, Ehlers recorded an assist, four shots on goal, and 17:31 of ice time in the Jets' season opener. A few days later, Ehlers recorded his first career overtime goal in a comeback victory over the Ottawa Senators on 19 January. Ehlers continued to find success throughout the month and maintained a career-high four game scoring streak for the first time since the 2016–17 season. By the end of the month, the Jets had a 5–3–1 record and Ehlers was reunited with Scheifele and Andrew Copp. By 17 February, Ehlers ranked tied for third in the NHL in goals with 10 on the season. As the Jets began to struggle offensively throughout February, head coach Paul Maurice moved newly acquired Pierre-Luc Dubois between Ehlers and Kyle Connor. This proved to be a successful change as Ehlers quickly began leading the Jets with 14 goals and ranked on the team with 29 points. He was recognized by the league as the NHL's Third Star of the Week for the week ending on 14 March after he recorded six points over three games. Ehlers played his 400th NHL game on 20 March 2021 in a 4–2 loss to the Edmonton Oilers. By the conclusion of March, Ehlers, Connor, and Scheifele were the only three teammates in the NHL to have at least 15 goals. On 14 April, Ehlers recorded his 300th NHL point in a 3–2 win over the Ottawa Senators. The following day, he recorded his 20th goal of the season to mark five consecutive seasons with at least 20 goals. Ehlers tallied 21 goals and 25 assists for 46 points through 47 games before suffering a regular season-ending injury in late April. Ehlers subsequently missed the final nine games of the regular season and the first two of the Jets' first round series against the Edmonton Oilers. He scored two goals in his return in game 3 to help the Jets to a 5–4 overtime victory. While the Jets swept the Oilers in four games, Ehlers' total ice time over the final two games of the series was 15:46 and 26:54, respectively.

Following the Jets' elimination, Ehlers represented Team Denmark in the 2022 Winter Olympics qualifiers. He scored five goals and four assists in three qualifying games to help secure Denmark's first appearance at the Olympics. On 20 January 2022, Ehlers was placed on long-term injured reserve due to a sprained MCL. At the time of the injury, Ehlers ranked tied for third on the Jets with 25 points. He missed 19 games to recover and returned to the Jets' lineup on 3 March.

Ehlers played in the first two games of the 2022–23 season before missing 36-straight games from 18 October to 6 January due to a sports hernia injury. On 22 February 2023, Ehlers became the third player in Jets team history to skate in his 500th career game. However, he suffered another injury on 11 April due to a hit during a game against the Minnesota Wild. Although Ehlers cleared concussion protocol, he missed the team's final regular season game. He eventually made his postseason debut in game 5 of the Jets' round one series against the Vegas Golden Knights. This would be his only postseason game as the Jets were eliminated by the Golden Knights in game 5.

==== Carolina Hurricanes (2025–present) ====
On 3 July 2025, Ehlers signed as a free agent with the Carolina Hurricanes for a 6-year deal worth $51 million. With 8 goals and 10 assists during the 2026 Stanley Cup playoffs, the Hurricanes won the Stanley Cup by defeating the Golden Knights, with Stankoven, Ehlers, and Staal leading the team in goals. He and teammate Frederik Andersen were together the second and third Danish players to win a Stanley Cup title, after only Lars Eller.

== International play ==
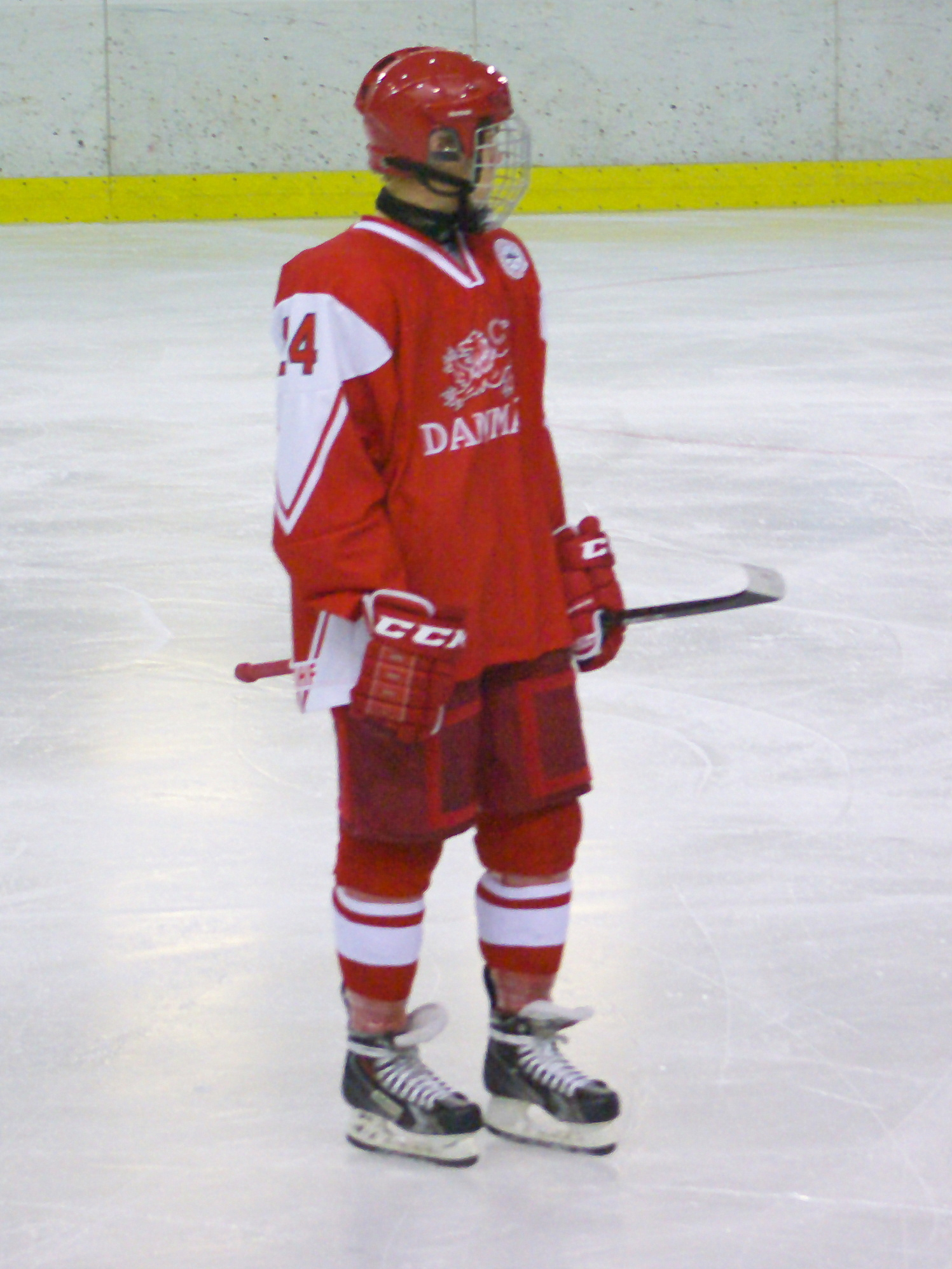
- Ehlers at the 2014 World Junior Division I A

Medal record

Men's Ice hockey

Representing Denmark

World U18 Division I Championship
Gold medal – first place	2013 Asiago	

World Junior Division I Championship
Gold medal – first place	2014 Sanok	

World Junior A Challenge
Silver medal – second place	2014 Kindersley	

Internationally, Ehlers has represented Denmark at both the junior and senior levels on the international level. He first represented the Denmark under-18 national team at the 2013 World U18 Championship Division I A tournament. Ehlers led the team in scoring with 11 points through five games, including four assists in the gold medal game against Norway under-18 team. He returned to the Denmark national team at the 2014 World U18 Championship Division I A where he recorded six points to help lead Denmark to a perfect 5–0 record. He also represented Denmark's under-20 national team at the 2014 World Junior A Challenge. Ehlers' efforts helped Denmark clinch a silver medal following a loss to the United States under-20 team. He was recognized with the World Junior A Challenge Most Valuable Player award at the end of the tournament.

Ehlers returned to Denmark's under-20 national team for the final time at the 2015 World Junior Championship. During the tournament, he played a significant role in leading Denmark to the quarterfinals by scoring in their opener against Russia under-20 team and assisting on two goals against the Czech Republic under-20 team. Ehlers scored in the shootout to lift Denmark over Switzerland under-20 team to lead them to their first win at the top level of the World Junior Championships. He recorded five points in the tournament while Denmark failed to medal.

Ehlers made his Denmark senior team debut at the 2016 World Championship. During the tournament, he scored four goals and two assists while Denmark came in eighth place. He also played for Denmark in the 2018 Winter Olympics qualifiers. He returned to the team for the 2017 World Championship but only tallied four assists while Denmark finished in 12th place. Following the Jets' elimination from the 2021 Stanley Cup playoffs, Ehlers represented Denmark in the 2022 Winter Olympics qualifiers. He scored five goals and four assists in three qualifying games to help secure Denmark's first appearance in the Olympics. On 8 October 2021, Ehlers was added to Denmark's 2022 Winter Olympics roster. However, he was ultimately unable to compete in the Olympics due to the NHL's rules. The league chose to not allow its players to compete as the regular season schedule had already been disrupted as a result of COVID-19 cases. Once the 2022–23 regular season was complete, Ehlers returned to Denmark national team and competed at the 2023 World Championship.

Following Winnipeg's game 6 OT loss to the Dallas Stars in May 2025, Ehlers joined Denmark for the 2025 World Championship.

== Personal life ==
Ehlers was born on 14 February 1996, in Aalborg, Denmark to parents Heinz and Tina Ehlers. Although he was born in Denmark, Ehlers and his family moved around Europe while his father played professional ice hockey. By the time he was 18, Ehlers spoke five languages – Danish, English, French, Swiss German and standard German. Ehlers attended kindergarten in Germany before his family spent five years in Denmark. After his playing career concluded, Heinz became a coach in the Swiss National League A and the entire family moved to Switzerland. While growing up in Switzerland, Ehlers played both ice hockey and football. He played on a provincial team in Switzerland before being forced to choose between the two sports.

Ehlers grew up alongside his older brother Sebastian and younger sister Caroline. Sebastian also plays ice hockey and most recently played for the Odense Bulldogs in the AL-Bank Ligaen. Outside of his immediate family, Ehlers' uncles and cousin have also played professional ice hockey. His uncle Søren was selected by the New York Rangers in the 12th round of the 1986 NHL entry draft, although he never appeared in a game. His cousin Alexander True went undrafted into the NHL and plays for the Modo Hockey. Ehlers and True played against each other for the first time at the NHL level during the 2019–20 season.

== Career statistics ==
=== Regular season and playoffs ===
			Regular season					Playoffs
Season	Team	League	GP	G	A	Pts	PIM	GP	G	A	Pts	PIM
2011–12	EHC Biel	SUI U17	7	4	5	9	12	—	—	—	—	—
2011–12	EHC Biel	SUI U20	28	17	17	34	6	—	—	—	—	—
2012–13	EHC Biel	SUI U20	32	26	23	49	34	—	—	—	—	—
2012–13	EHC Biel	NLA	11	1	1	2	0	7	0	3	3	0
2013–14	Halifax Mooseheads	QMJHL	63	49	55	104	51	16	11	17	28	18
2014–15	Halifax Mooseheads	QMJHL	51	37	64	101	67	14	10	21	31	14
2015–16	Winnipeg Jets	NHL	72	15	23	38	21	—	—	—	—	—
2016–17	Winnipeg Jets	NHL	82	25	39	64	38	—	—	—	—	—
2017–18	Winnipeg Jets	NHL	82	29	31	60	26	15	0	7	7	2
2018–19	Winnipeg Jets	NHL	62	21	16	37	15	6	0	0	0	0
2019–20	Winnipeg Jets	NHL	71	25	33	58	30	4	2	0	2	2
2020–21	Winnipeg Jets	NHL	47	21	25	46	15	6	2	1	3	2
2021–22	Winnipeg Jets	NHL	62	28	27	55	20	—	—	—	—	—
2022–23	Winnipeg Jets	NHL	45	12	26	38	11	1	0	0	0	0
2023–24	Winnipeg Jets	NHL	82	25	36	61	29	5	0	2	2	0
2024–25	Winnipeg Jets	NHL	69	24	39	63	17	8	5	2	7	4
2025–26	Carolina Hurricanes	NHL	82	26	45	71	14	18	8	10	18	6
NHL totals			756	251	340	591	236	63	17	22	39	16
NL totals			11	1	1	2	0	7	0	3	3	0

=== International ===
Year	Team	Event	GP	G	A	Pts	PIM
2013	Denmark	U18 D1A	5	3	8	11	2
2014	Denmark	WJC D1A	5	2	4	6	4
2014	Denmark	WJAC	4	6	3	9	4
2015	Denmark	WJC	5	1	3	4	2
2016	Denmark	WC	8	4	2	6	4
2016	Denmark	OGQ	3	1	1	2	0
2017	Denmark	WC	7	0	4	4	18
2021	Denmark	OGQ	3	5	4	9	2
2022	Denmark	WC	7	1	6	7	2
2023	Denmark	WC	7	5	4	9	0
2024	Denmark	OGQ	3	1	3	4	2
2025	Denmark	WC	4	3	0	3	2
2026	Denmark	OG	4	1	2	3	0
Junior totals			19	12	18	30	12
Senior totals			46	21	26	47	30

== Awards and honours ==
Award	Year	Ref
QMJHL
RDS Cup	2013–14	
Michael Bossy Trophy	2013–14	
Paul Dumont Trophy	2014–15	
First All-Star Team	2014–15	
NHL
Stanley Cup champion	2026	
International
World Junior A Challenge Most Valuable Player	2014	

Awards and achievements
Preceded by Josh Morrissey	Winnipeg Jets first-round draft pick 2014	Succeeded by Kyle Connor
