= Broka =

Family name

Origin
- Origin: Latvian

Broka (masculine: Broks) is a Latvian surname. Individuals with the surname include:

- Baiba Broka (born 1973), Latvian actress
- Baiba Broka (born 1975), Latvian politician
- Terēze Broka (1925–2018), Latvian conductor and educator
