= Brock River =

Brock River may refer to:

- Brock River (Chibougamau River), a tributary of the Chibougamau River, in Eeyou Istchee Baie-James, Nord-du-Québec, Quebec
  - Brock River West, a tributary of Brock River, Quebec
  - Brock River North, a tributary of Brock River, Quebec
- Brock River (Missisquoi River), a tributary of the Missisquoi River, in Sutton, Quebec

== See also ==
- Brock (disambiguation)
- River Brock, a river in Lancashire, England
