= Heinz Ehlers =

Danish ice hockey player and coach

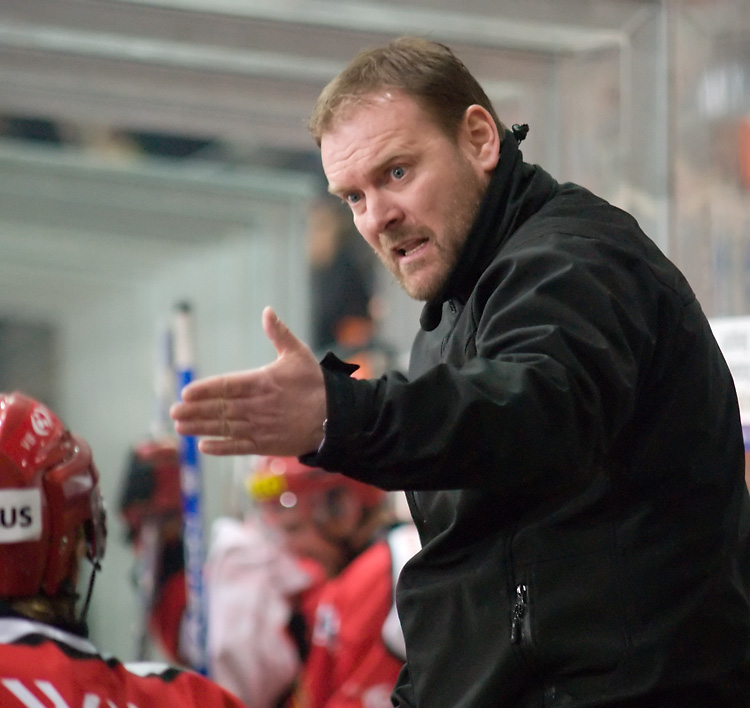
- Born: January 25, 1966 (age 60) Aalborg, Denmark
- Height: 6 ft 0 in (183 cm)
- Weight: 190 lb (86 kg; 13 st 8 lb)
- Position: Left wing
- Shot: Left
- Played for: Klagenfurter AC; AaB Aalborg; Leksands IF; AIK IF; Rögle BK; Augsburger Panther; Berlin Capitals; EHC Biel-Bienne
- National team: Denmark
- NHL draft: 188th overall, 1984; New York Rangers
- Playing career: 1984–2004

Heinz Ehlers (born January 25, 1966) is a Danish professional ice hockey coach and former ice hockey player. He was most recently the head coach of the SCL Tigers in the National League A (NLA) and the Denmark national hockey team.

Ehlers was selected by the New York Rangers in the 9th round (188th overall) of the 1984 NHL entry draft, but never played in the league. Ehlers played professionally in Europe for over 20 years, most notably in the Swedish Hockey League and Deutsche Eishockey Liga. He was inducted into the Danish ice hockey Hall of Fame in 2014.

== Playing career ==
After spending the early stages of his career in his native Aalborg, Ehlers embarked on a five-year stint with Leksands IF of the Swedish Hockey League (SHL) in 1984. In 1989, he transferred to another SHL team, AIK IF, and in 1991-92 helped Rögle BK earn promotion to the SHL.

Ehlers played in the Swiss elite league NLA for EHC Biel in 93-94, followed by two years with Klagenfurter AC of Austria. He left his mark in the German top-flight Deutsche Eishockey Liga, turning out for DEL teams Augsburger Panther and Berlin Capitals. He served as a team captain for the Capitals and returned to his native Denmark after five years in the German capital city.

Ehlers played another two years with AaB Ishockey and concluded his playing career following the 2003-04 campaign.

== National team ==
Ehlers earned a total of 104 caps for the Danish national team, tallying 60 goals and 103 assists. He played in nine World Championships. He was named head coach for the national team on June 29, 2018.

== Coaching career ==
His first head coaching stint came at Aalborg in 2005-06. In May 2007, he took over EHC Biel and steered the team to the NLB championship and promotion to the Swiss top-tier National League A (NLA). He was sacked in April 2009 following a run of six straight losses.

Ehlers accepted the head coaching job at NLB side SC Langenthal in November 2009. He hauled in his second NLB title in 2011-12 and the club's first ever. Ehlers left SCL after the 2012-13 campaign to take on a new challenge in Switzerland's top-flight National League A (NLA), signing with Lausanne HC in March 2013. He turned the newly promoted team into a solid NLA squad, guiding Lausanne to back-to-back playoff appearances in 2013-14 and 2014-15. Despite having a year of his contract left to run, he was relieved of his duties after the 2015-16 season. About a month before parting ways, Lausanne's president had questioned Ehlers' defensive style of play.

In early October 2016, he took over head coaching duties for the SCL Tigers of the Swiss NLA and additionally became assistant coach of Denmark's men's national team in October 2017.

== Personal life ==
Heinz and his wife Tina have three children together, two of whom play professional ice hockey. His oldest son Sebastian plays for the Odense Bulldogs in the AL-Bank Ligaen while his youngest son Nikolaj plays for the Carolina Hurricanes of the National Hockey League.

== Career statistics ==
| | | | Regular season | | | | | Playoffs |
| Season | Team | League | GP | G | A | Pts | PIM | GP | G | A | Pts | PIM |
|---|---|---|---|---|---|---|---|---|---|---|---|---|
| 1981–82 | Aalborg Pirates II | Denmark2 | 26 | 17 | 32 | 49 | 28 | — | — | — | — | — |
| 1982–83 | Aalborg Pirates II | Denmark2 | — | — | — | — | — | — | — | — | — | — |
| 1983–84 | Aalborg Pirates II | Denmark2 | 28 | 37 | 26 | 63 | 22 | — | — | — | — | — |
| 1984–85 | Leksands IF | SHL | 31 | 10 | 6 | 16 | 10 | — | — | — | — | — |
| 1985–86 | Leksands IF | SHL | 36 | 11 | 16 | 27 | 18 | — | — | — | — | — |
| 1986–87 | Leksands IF | SHL | 36 | 14 | 21 | 35 | 32 | — | — | — | — | — |
| 1987–88 | Leksands IF | SHL | 35 | 20 | 12 | 32 | 42 | 3 | 1 | 0 | 1 | 2 |
| 1988–89 | Leksands IF | SHL | 33 | 13 | 27 | 40 | 40 | 3 | 1 | 1 | 2 | 18 |
| 1989–90 | AIK IF | SHL | 27 | 11 | 16 | 27 | 44 | 3 | 1 | 3 | 4 | 2 |
| 1990–91 | AIK IF | SHL | 28 | 7 | 14 | 21 | 26 | — | — | — | — | — |
| 1991–92 | Rögle BK | Division 1 | 35 | 28 | 46 | 74 | 68 | 5 | 3 | 3 | 6 | 6 |
| 1992–93 | Rögle BK | SHL | 38 | 7 | 26 | 33 | 92 | — | — | — | — | — |
| 1993–94 | AaB | Denmark | 9 | 8 | 21 | 29 | 19 | — | — | — | — | — |
| 1993–94 | EHC Biel-Bienne | NLA | 22 | 7 | 19 | 26 | 12 | — | — | — | — | — |
| 1994–95 | Klagenfurter AC | Austria | 14 | 7 | 9 | 16 | 18 | — | — | — | — | — |
| 1995–96 | Klagenfurter AC | Austria | 9 | 1 | 5 | 6 | 8 | — | — | — | — | — |
| 1995–96 | Augsburger Panther | DEL | 22 | 5 | 15 | 20 | 63 | 7 | 1 | 6 | 7 | 8 |
| 1996–97 | Augsburger Panther | DEL | 38 | 10 | 31 | 41 | 58 | — | — | — | — | — |
| 1997–98 | Berlin Capitals | DEL | 44 | 8 | 25 | 33 | 36 | 4 | 1 | 0 | 1 | 2 |
| 1998–99 | Berlin Capitals | DEL | 50 | 8 | 30 | 38 | 46 | — | — | — | — | — |
| 1999–00 | Berlin Capitals | DEL | 49 | 6 | 30 | 36 | 56 | 3 | 0 | 0 | 0 | 2 |
| 2000–01 | Berlin Capitals | DEL | 39 | 9 | 25 | 34 | 34 | 5 | 0 | 1 | 1 | 4 |
| 2001–02 | Berlin Capitals | DEL | 47 | 6 | 30 | 36 | 62 | — | — | — | — | — |
| 2002–03 | Aalborg IK Panthers | Denmark | 24 | 7 | 19 | 26 | 94 | 6 | 2 | 1 | 3 | 4 |
| 2003–04 | AaB Ishockey | Denmark | 35 | 12 | 19 | 31 | 109 | — | — | — | — | — |
| DEL totals | | | 289 | 52 | 186 | 238 | 355 | 23 | 2 | 11 | 13 | 18 |
| SHL totals | | | 264 | 93 | 138 | 231 | 304 | 9 | 3 | 4 | 7 | 22 |
