= London Motors =

London Motors was a Canadian automobile company located in London, Ontario. The company was formed by William Stansell, who was previously involved with the production of the Brock car in Amherstburg, Ontario.

In 1921 Stansell raised $75,000 to form London Motors Limited, with a factory located at King and Ridout Streets. Prototypes were ready by the autumn of 1921.

The London Six featured wooden disc wheels, a pointed windscreen and a Herschell-Spillman 6-cylinder engine.

The engine was tilted down at the rear, providing a lower drive shaft and reducing universal joint strain. The aluminium body made the car very light, allowing a top speed of 137 km/h (85 mph) to be reached.

Production began in late 1921, with the following models:

- Touring car
- Hardtop tourer/roadster
- Sedan
- Sedan Special

Prices ranged from $2,600 for the tourer to $3,700 for the sedan. The car's slogan was "Canada's Quality Car".

Bodies were originally built at a factory in Ingersoll, Ontario, but when the supplier was unable to keep up with demand, Stansell rented factory space next door to the London Motors factory.

When Governor General Julian Byng visited London, several London Six owners loaned their cars for official ceremonies. Lady Byng claimed that the London Six was the most comfortable car that she had ever travelled in.

In 1924, Stansell made visits to various firms and bankers looking for extra capital in order to expand production. In his absence, the board of directors of the company allowed control to be taken over by new investors, who wound up the company in early 1925. Total production of the London Six was 98 cars.
