= 2018 National Hockey League All-Star Game =

Professional ice hockey exhibition game

2018 NHL All-Star Game

Amalie Arena, Tampa
- January 28, 2018
- Game one: Pacific 5 – 2 Central
- Game two: Atlantic 7 – 4 Metropolitan
- Game three: Pacific 5 – 2 Atlantic
- MVP: Brock Boeser (Pacific)
- Attendance: 19,092

The 2018 National Hockey League All-Star Game took place at Amalie Arena in Tampa, home of the Tampa Bay Lightning on January 28, 2018. Tampa last held the NHL All-Star Game in 1999. The All-Star Game was played in lieu of NHL participation in the 2018 Winter Olympics, as the NHL Board of Governors ruled against interrupting the season to send players to Pyeongchang from February 10 to 25.

The Pacific All-Stars won the All-Star Game, which was in its third straight year of a four-team, 3-on-3, single elimination format, with one team representing each of the league's four divisions. Rookie Brock Boeser of the Vancouver Canucks was named the Most Valuable Player, scoring two goals with an assist. He became the first rookie to win MVP since Mario Lemieux in 1985.

== Format ==
The 2018 All-Star Game again used the 3-on-3 tournament format successfully introduced in 2016, in which teams representing each of the NHL's four divisions (the Atlantic, Metropolitan, Central, and Pacific) played a single-elimination tournament, with each game consisting of two 10-minute halves played 3-on-3 and going directly to a shootout if tied after 20 minutes.

In keeping with the four-team format, four separate uniforms were unveiled on January 3, one for each division. As with the previous year, the jerseys are meant to be of high contrast against one another to avoid confusion regardless of which teams face off. The primary colors of each jersey mirror the colors used by the event's host, the Lightning, with the Pacific division in white, the Central in black, the Atlantic in blue, and the Metropolitan in gray. Accent colors of "solar red" (on the Western Conference uniforms) and "UV yellow" (on the Eastern Conference uniforms) are meant to evoke the "warm, vibrant sunset tones and the energy of the Tampa Bay area." The custom-designed number font also includes a pattern based on the suspension cables of the nearby Sunshine Skyway Bridge. The uniforms also see a nod to classic 1980s All-Star uniforms in the inclusion of stars on the sleeves, one for each division.

== Skills Competition ==
The NHL All-Star Skills Competition took place the day before the All-Star Game on January 27, 2018, at Amalie Arena. Event winners were awarded a $25,000 prize, with new events the passing challenge and goalie save streak added to the competition. The winners were:

- Fastest Skater – Connor McDavid, Edmonton Oilers, 13.454 seconds
- Puck Control Relay – Johnny Gaudreau, Calgary Flames, 24.650 seconds
- Passing Challenge – Alex Pietrangelo, St. Louis Blues, 46.610 seconds
- Save Streak – Marc-Andre Fleury, Vegas Golden Knights, 14 saves
- Hardest Shot – Alexander Ovechkin, Washington Capitals, 101.3 mph
- Accuracy Shooting – Brock Boeser, Vancouver Canucks, 11.136 seconds

== Rosters ==
As in the previous two All-Star Games, captaincy of each division was determined by a fan vote, running from December 2, 2017 until January 1, 2018. On January 3, 2018, after a month of fan voting, the four captains were announced by the NHL. Steven Stamkos of the hosting Lightning was selected captain for the Atlantic Division. Alexander Ovechkin of the Washington Capitals was selected for the Metropolitan Division. P. K. Subban of the Nashville Predators and Connor McDavid of the Edmonton Oilers were selected to captain the Central and Pacific Divisions, respectively, for the second consecutive year.

On January 7, Jon Cooper of the Lightning was named head coach of the Atlantic Division Team. Joining him as coaches are Peter Laviolette of the Predators (Central), Barry Trotz of the Capitals (Metropolitan), and Gerard Gallant of the Golden Knights (Pacific). Coaches are chosen from the team in each division with the highest points percentage through January 6, the season's halfway point: the Lightning sat at 0.744 with 61 points as the top team in the NHL, trailed by the Golden Knights at 0.725 with 58 points. The Predators, with a 0.659 percentage and 54 points, were ranked fourth while the Capitals, sitting at a 0.646 percentage for 53 points, ranked sixth overall.

Full team rosters were announced on January 10, 2018. Brock Boeser, the Vancouver Canucks' first-round draft pick in 2015, was the sole rookie selected to appear in the 2018 All-Star Game. As of January 10, he led all rookies in goals and points with 22 and 40 respectively through 40 games, placing him fifth overall in goal scoring in the entire NHL.

Under a week prior to the game, Jonathan Quick of the Los Angeles Kings elected to not accept his invitation. As a consequence, he was suspended for one regular season game. Mike Smith of the Flames replaced Quick and joined Marc-Andre Fleury as the goalies for the Pacific Division. As well, Taylor Hall of the New Jersey Devils was injured and replaced by Brian Boyle in the Metropolitan Division.

Atlantic Division
Head coach: (Canada) Jon Cooper, Tampa Bay Lightning
| Nat. | Player | Team | Pos. | # |
|---|---|---|---|---|
| (Finland) | Aleksander Barkov | Florida Panthers | F | 16 |
| (United States) | Jack Eichel | Buffalo Sabres | F | 15 |
| (Russia) | Nikita Kucherov | Tampa Bay Lightning | F | 86 |
| (Canada) | Brad Marchand | Boston Bruins | F | 63 |
| (United States) | Auston Matthews | Toronto Maple Leafs | F | 34 |
| (Canada) | Brayden Point^{†} | Tampa Bay Lightning | F | 21 |
| (Canada) | Steven Stamkos (C) | Tampa Bay Lightning | F | 91 |
| (Canada) | Mike Green | Detroit Red Wings | D | 25 |
| (Sweden) | Erik Karlsson | Ottawa Senators | D | 65 |
| (Canada) | Carey Price | Montreal Canadiens | G | 31 |
| (Russia) | Andrei Vasilevskiy | Tampa Bay Lightning | G | 88 |

- ^{†} Replacing Victor Hedman due to injury.

Metropolitan Division
Head coach: (Canada) Barry Trotz, Washington Capitals
| Nat. | Player | Team | Pos. | # |
|---|---|---|---|---|
| (Canada) | Josh Bailey | New York Islanders | F | 12 |
| (Canada) | Sidney Crosby | Pittsburgh Penguins | F | 87 |
| (Canada) | Claude Giroux | Philadelphia Flyers | F | 28 |
| (United States) | Brian Boyle^{†} | New Jersey Devils | F | 11 |
| (Russia) | Alexander Ovechkin (C) | Washington Capitals | F | 8 |
| (Canada) | John Tavares | New York Islanders | F | 91 |
| (United States) | Noah Hanifin | Carolina Hurricanes | D | 5 |
| (United States) | Zach Werenski^{‡} | Columbus Blue Jackets | D | 8 |
| (Canada) | Kris Letang | Pittsburgh Penguins | D | 58 |
| (Canada) | Braden Holtby | Washington Capitals | G | 70 |
| (Sweden) | Henrik Lundqvist | New York Rangers | G | 30 |

- ^{†} Replacing Taylor Hall due to injury.
- ^{‡} Replacing Seth Jones due to illness.

Central Division
Head coach: (United States) Peter Laviolette, Nashville Predators
| Nat. | Player | Team | Pos. | # |
|---|---|---|---|---|
| (United States) | Patrick Kane | Chicago Blackhawks | F | 88 |
| (Canada) | Nathan MacKinnon | Colorado Avalanche | F | 29 |
| (Canada) | Brayden Schenn | St Louis Blues | F | 10 |
| (Canada) | Tyler Seguin | Dallas Stars | F | 91 |
| (Canada) | Eric Staal | Minnesota Wild | F | 12 |
| (United States) | Blake Wheeler | Winnipeg Jets | F | 26 |
| (Sweden) | John Klingberg | Dallas Stars | D | 3 |
| (Canada) | Alex Pietrangelo | St Louis Blues | D | 27 |
| (Canada) | P. K. Subban (C) | Nashville Predators | D | 76 |
| (United States) | Connor Hellebuyck | Winnipeg Jets | G | 37 |
| (Finland) | Pekka Rinne | Nashville Predators | G | 35 |

Pacific Division
Head coach: (Canada) Gerard Gallant, Vegas Golden Knights
| Nat. | Player | Team | Pos. | # |
|---|---|---|---|---|
| (United States) | Brock Boeser | Vancouver Canucks | F | 6 |
| (United States) | Johnny Gaudreau | Calgary Flames | F | 13 |
| (Slovenia) | Anze Kopitar | Los Angeles Kings | F | 11 |
| (Canada) | Connor McDavid (C) | Edmonton Oilers | F | 97 |
| (Canada) | James Neal | Vegas Golden Knights | F | 18 |
| (Sweden) | Rickard Rakell | Anaheim Ducks | F | 67 |
| (Canada) | Brent Burns | San Jose Sharks | D | 88 |
| (Canada) | Drew Doughty | Los Angeles Kings | D | 8 |
| (Sweden) | Oliver Ekman-Larsson | Arizona Coyotes | D | 23 |
| (Canada) | Marc-Andre Fleury | Vegas Golden Knights | G | 29 |
| (Canada) | Mike Smith^{†} | Calgary Flames | G | 41 |

- ^{†} Replacing Jonathan Quick due to injury.

== Uniforms ==
As with the previous game, the NHL used four uniquely-colored jerseys for each of the four division teams. As this was the first game with Adidas as the uniform supplier, the uniforms all featured Adidas' trademark three stripes down the sides of the jerseys, underneath the arms. The colors for each division were: blue with yellow trim, with blue pants, for the Atlantic; gray with yellow trim and black pants for the Metropolitan; black with reddish-orange trim and black pants for the Central; and white with reddish-orange trim and white pants for the Pacific. White pants had previously only been worn in the NHL by the 1974–75 Washington Capitals for a few games, and the Los Angeles Kings for the 2015 NHL Stadium Series game. The numbers on the back of the jerseys featured a pattern based on the Sunshine Skyway Bridge.

== Bracket ==
| Semi-Finals | | Final |
| Metropolitan | 4 |
| Atlantic | 7 | Atlantic | 2 |
| Central | 2 | Pacific | 5 |
| Pacific | 5 |

== Game summaries ==
=== First semifinal game ===
| January 28, 2018 | Central | 2–5 | Pacific | Amalie Arena | Recap |
| 01:47 – Nathan MacKinnon (1) | | First period | No scoring |
| 07:29 – P.K. Subban (1) | | Second period | Drew Doughty (1) – 04:13; James Neal (1) – 06:57; Brock Boeser (1) – 08:14; Brent Burns (1) – en – 08:38; James Neal (2) – en – 09:18 |
| No period | | Third period | No period |
| Pekka Rinne 4 saves / 4 shots Connor Hellebuyck 5 saves / 8 shots | | Goalie stats | Marc-Andre Fleury 7 saves / 8 shots Mike Smith 7 saves / 8 shots |

=== Second semifinal game ===
| January 28, 2018 | Metropolitan | 4–7 | Atlantic | Amalie Arena | Recap |
| 01:09 – Sidney Crosby (1); 07:43 – Claude Giroux (1); 08:16 – Alexander Ovechkin (1) | | First period | Auston Matthews (1) – 05:30; Nikita Kucherov (1) – 08:27 |
| 03:17 – Kris Letang (1) | | Second period | Nikita Kucherov (2) – 02:13; Brayden Point (1) – 04:33; Jack Eichel (1) – 06:40; Brad Marchand (1) – 07:41; Nikita Kucherov (3) – 07:56 |
| No period | | Third period | No period |
| Henrik Lundqvist 5 saves / 7 shots Braden Holtby 5 saves / 10 shots | | Goalie stats | Andrei Vasilevskiy 10 saves / 13 shots Carey Price 8 saves / 9 shots |

=== Final ===
| January 28, 2018 | Pacific | 5–2 | Atlantic | Amalie Arena | Recap |
| 00:59 – Rickard Rakell (1); 05:05 – Brock Boeser (2); 08:35 – Drew Doughty (2) | | First period | Mike Green (1) – 06:08 |
| 01:51 – Johnny Gaudreau (1); 07:24 – Rickard Rakell (2) | | Second period | Mike Green (2) – 03:26 |
| No period | | Third period | No period |
| Marc-Andre Fleury 3 saves / 4 shots Mike Smith 6 saves / 7 shots | | Goalie stats | Andrei Vasilevskiy 8 saves / 11 shots Carey Price 6 saves / 8 shots |

== Festivities and entertainment ==
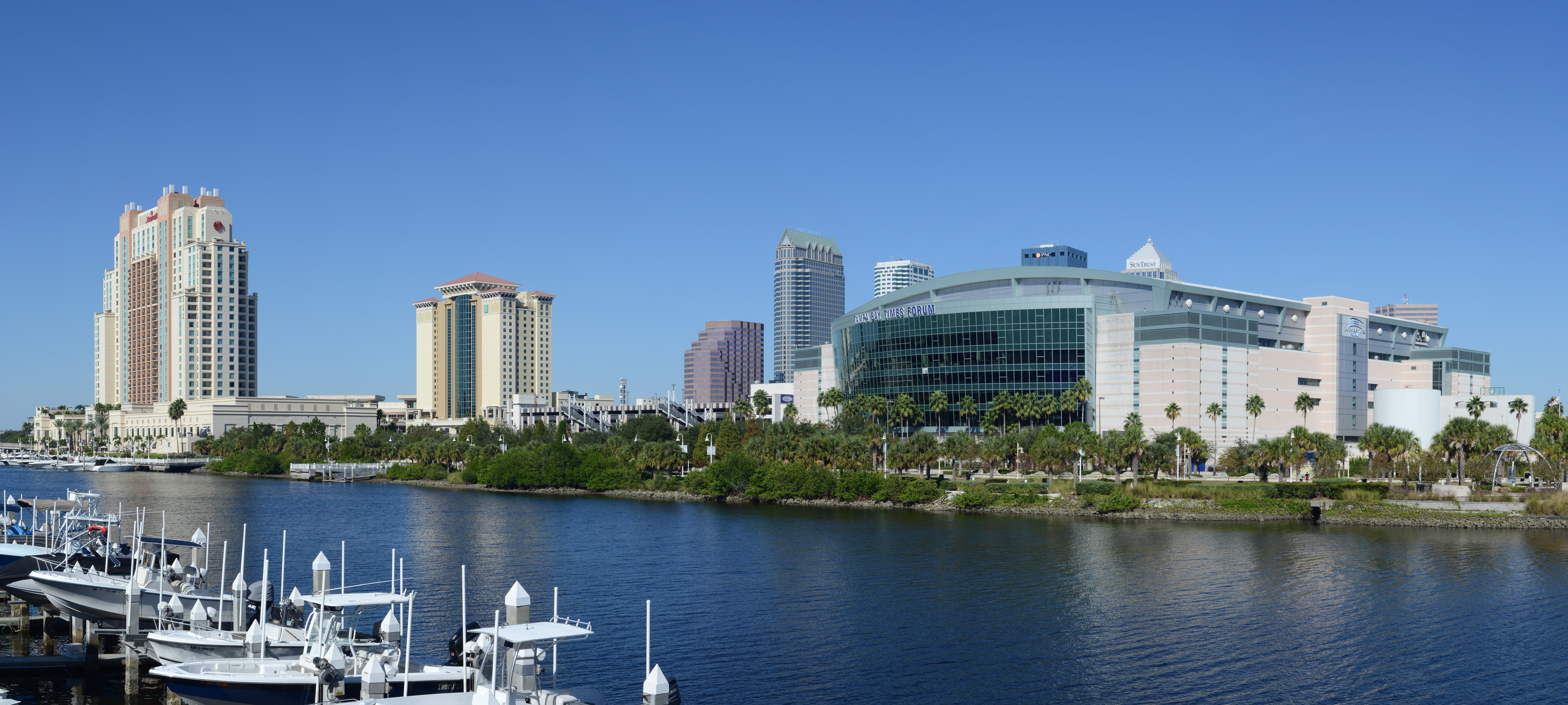
Amalie Arena, home to the Tampa Bay Lightning, is located in Tampa's Channelside District overlooking Garrison Channel

All-Star celebrations began on January 26 with the 2018 NHL All-Star pregame near the arena. Events included an opportunity to meet NHL mascots, participate in skills challenges in the NHL All-Star Skills Zone, view the NHL's various trophies, including the Stanley Cup, and meet past and present NHL players for autographs. The pregame was a recurring event open all of All-Star Weekend.

All-Star Friday Night included the Enterprise NHL All-Star Friday Night concert at Curtis Hixon Park headlined by Fitz and the Tantrums.

The 2018 Gasparilla Pirate Festival and the Gasparilla Parade of the Pirates took place nearby on January 27, prior to the All-Star Skills Competition at Amalie Arena. Former Lightning center Vincent Lecavalier was named the grand marshal for the parade, and regarded as a "perfect choice" by Christopher Lykes, the Captain of Ye Mystic Krewe of Gasparilla, who have hosted the parade annually since 1904. According to Lykes, "Vinny was a force with the Lightning and a force as an NHL All-Star. He has continued his leadership by being an active and positive role model in our community."

The All-Star Red Carpet began prior to the All-Star Game at 1:00 pm on January 28, with further opportunities for fans to interact with the players as they enter the arena. Kid Rock performed during the second intermission, prior to the start of the championship game. News of his performance was announced during NBCSN's pregame coverage for the January 16 Flyers-Rangers game. The announcement was received with mixed opinions, due to a combination of factors including the length of time since his last major musical hit and his political stances.

Lindsay Ell sang the Canadian national anthem while Brett Young sang the American national anthem.

== Television ==
The All-Star Game and skills competition were broadcast in the United States by NBC and NBCSN, respectively. This marked the second consecutive season that the All-Star Game was broadcast on American broadcast network television: the year before, it returned to NBC and network television at large for the first time since 2004. In Canada, both the All-Star Game and skills competition were broadcast on both CBC and Sportsnet, and on TVA Sports in French.
