= Brock Boyle =

Canadian lacrosse player

Personal information
- Born: June 14, 1982 (age 43) Toronto, Ontario, Canada
- Height: 5 ft 8 in (173 cm)
- Weight: 175 lb (79 kg; 12 st 7 lb)

Sport
- Position: Defense
- NLL draft: 24th overall, 2002; Albany Attack
- NLL team Former teams: Edmonton Rush; Rochester Knighthawks; Chicago Shamrox; Albany Attack; Minnesota Swarm
- Pro career: 2003–

Brock Boyle (born June 14, 1982 in Toronto, Ontario) is a Canadian lacrosse player who plays for the Edmonton Rush in the National Lacrosse League. He has also played for the Minnesota Swarm, Rochester Knighthawks, Chicago Shamrox, and Albany Attack during his career.

== Statistics ==
=== NLL ===
		Regular Season						Playoffs
Season	Team	GP	G	A	Pts	LB	PIM	GP	G	A	Pts	LB	PIM
2003	Albany	1	0	0	0	0	14	--	--	--	--	--	--
2005	Minnesota	15	9	3	12	44	18	--	--	--	--	--	--
2006	Minnesota	16	13	11	24	48	23	1	1	1	2	6	0
2007	Minnesota	12	8	7	15	41	12	0	0	0	0	0	0
2008	Chicago	7	0	5	5	31	23	--	--	--	--	--	--
2009	Rochester	1	0	0	0	4	0	--	--	--	--	--	--
2011	Minnesota	2	0	0	0	3	7	--	--	--	--	--	--
NLL totals		54	30	26	56	171	97	1	1	1	2	6	0
