= Brock Boeser =

American ice hockey player (born 1997)

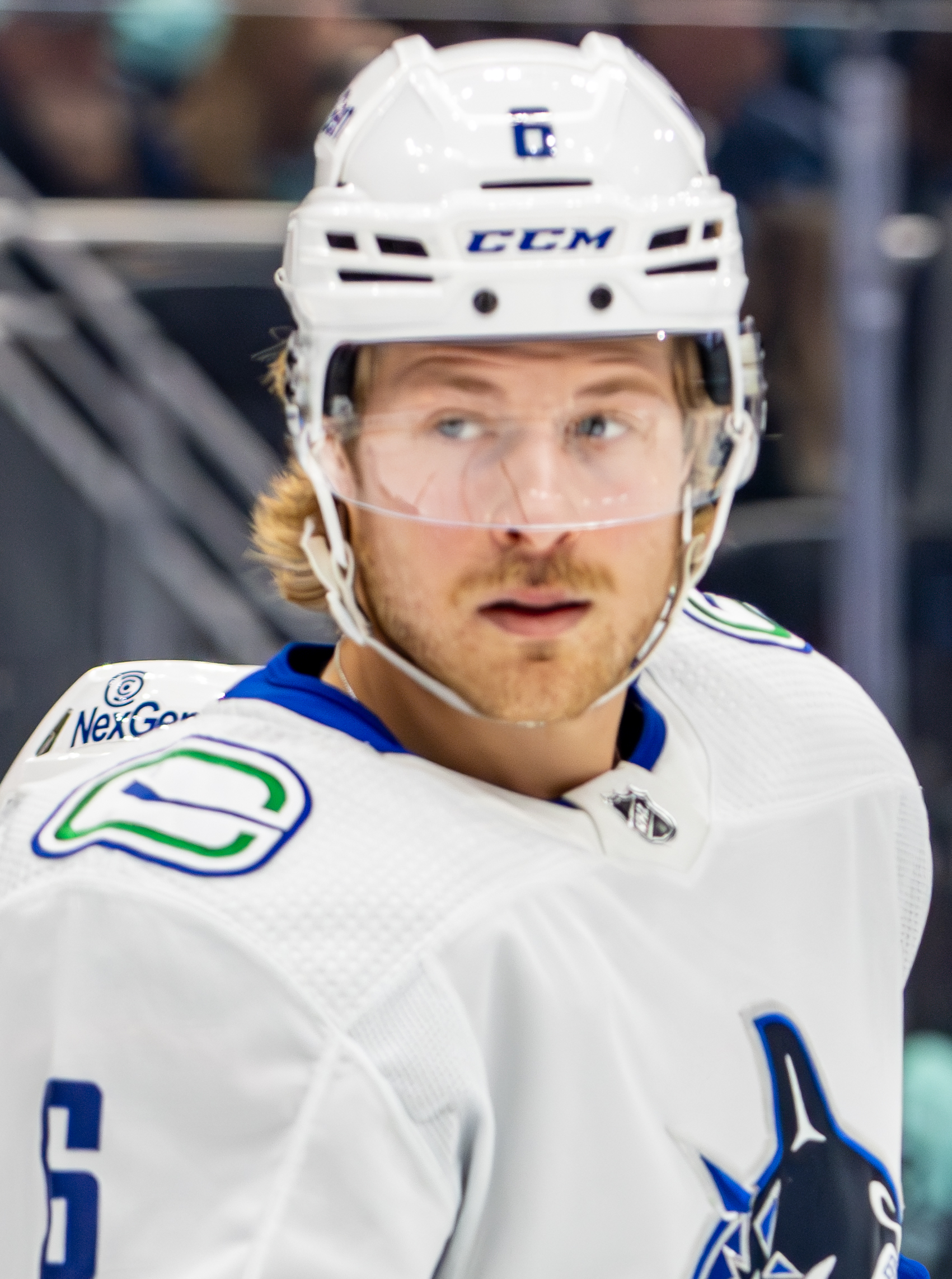
- Boeser in 2023
- Born: February 25, 1997 (age 29) Burnsville, Minnesota, U.S.
- Height: 6 ft 1 in (185 cm)
- Weight: 208 lb (94 kg; 14 st 12 lb)
- Position: Right wing
- Shoots: Right
- NHL team: Vancouver Canucks
- NHL draft: 23rd overall, 2015; Vancouver Canucks
- Playing career: 2017–present

Brock Michael Boeser (/ˈbɛsər/ BESS-ər; born February 25, 1997) is an American professional ice hockey player who is a right winger and alternate captain for the Vancouver Canucks of the National Hockey League (NHL).

A top prospect with the Waterloo Black Hawks of the United States Hockey League (USHL), Boeser was selected 23rd overall in the 2015 NHL entry draft by the Canucks and spent the following two seasons with the University of North Dakota. He made his NHL debut in 2017 with Vancouver. Internationally, Boeser has played for the United States national junior team at the 2016 World Junior Championships, where he helped the team win a bronze medal.

== Playing career ==
=== Amateur ===
While playing ice hockey at Burnsville High School, Boeser was drafted first overall by the Sioux City Musketeers in the United States Hockey League (USHL). However, he was later traded to the Waterloo Black Hawks in exchange for Cooper Watson. In his first season with the Black Hawks, the 2014–15 season, Boeser led the league with 35 goals and was named to both the All Rookie First Team and First All-Star Team. In 2015, Boeser was picked to represent the United States national junior team in the 2016 World Junior Championships, as the team took bronze. During the 2015–16 season Boeser started playing college ice hockey for the University of North Dakota. As a freshman, he led his team to win the 2016 NCAA Division I national championship. Boeser also finished the season as third-best in the nation in scoring with 60 points and was named a First Team All-American. Boeser declined leaving early for the NHL just yet however and opted to return to North Dakota for another season. He finished his sophomore year with 34 points and missed part of the 2016–17 season, while sidelined with a wrist injury. Boeser then decided to make the jump for the NHL after North Dakota was eliminated in the 2017 NCAA tournament.

=== Professional ===
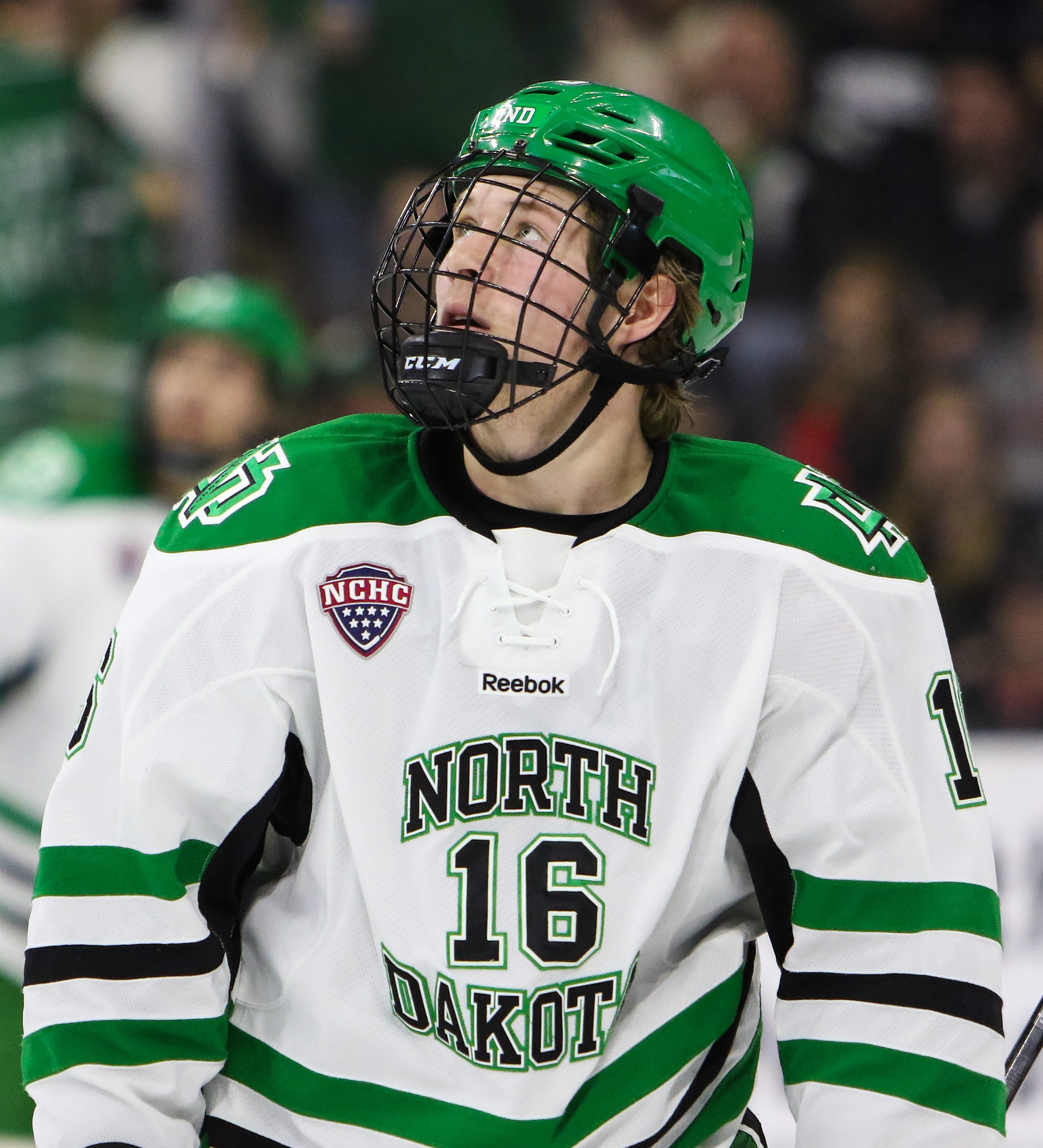
Boeser during his time at the University of North Dakota in 2016

Boeser was selected 23rd overall by the Vancouver Canucks in the 2015 NHL entry draft. He signed a three-year, entry-level contract with the Canucks on March 25, 2017. Later that same day, he made his NHL debut in his home state of Minnesota and scored his first NHL goal in the 4–2 win over the Minnesota Wild.

On November 4, 2017, Boeser scored a hat trick, becoming the first Canucks player at the age of 20 or younger to do so since Trevor Linden on December 20, 1990, as well as the third-youngest behind Linden and Tony Tanti. All three goals came against Matt Murray of the Pittsburgh Penguins, allowing the Canucks to win 4–2. Boeser was named NHL rookie of the month for November 2017 after leading all skaters with 11 goals in 15 games. He was again named Rookie of the Month for the month of December after scoring eight goals and 13 points in 13 games. On January 10, 2018, Boeser was named to his first career NHL All-Star Game as a member of the Pacific Division roster. With two goals and an assist in two games, Boeser was named the most valuable player (MVP) of the 2018 NHL All-Star Game becoming the first rookie to do so since Mario Lemieux in 1985. Boeser also won the 2018 accuracy shooting contest, hitting all five targets in 11.136 seconds. He was injured in a game against the New York Islanders on March 5, when he collided with Cal Clutterbuck and the Canucks bench. It was later reported he suffered a back injury and would miss four-to-six weeks to recover. At the time of his injury, he led the team in goals, points, shots on goal, and power-play points. Despite missing the final 16 games of the 2017–18 season, Boeser was named a finalist for the Calder Memorial Trophy, which is awarded to the league's best rookie of the year. The award was ultimately won by the New York Islanders' Mathew Barzal.

Boeser recovered from his injury and joined the Canucks for the 2018–19 season. He played 13 games and collected 11 points, despite injuring his groin in a game against the Winnipeg Jets on October 18, 2018. After missing two games in November due to his groin injury, Boeser was sent back to Vancouver to be examined by a specialist, while the team was on a road trip. After being assigned to the injured reserve for 11 games, Boeser was assigned back to the roster on November 27.

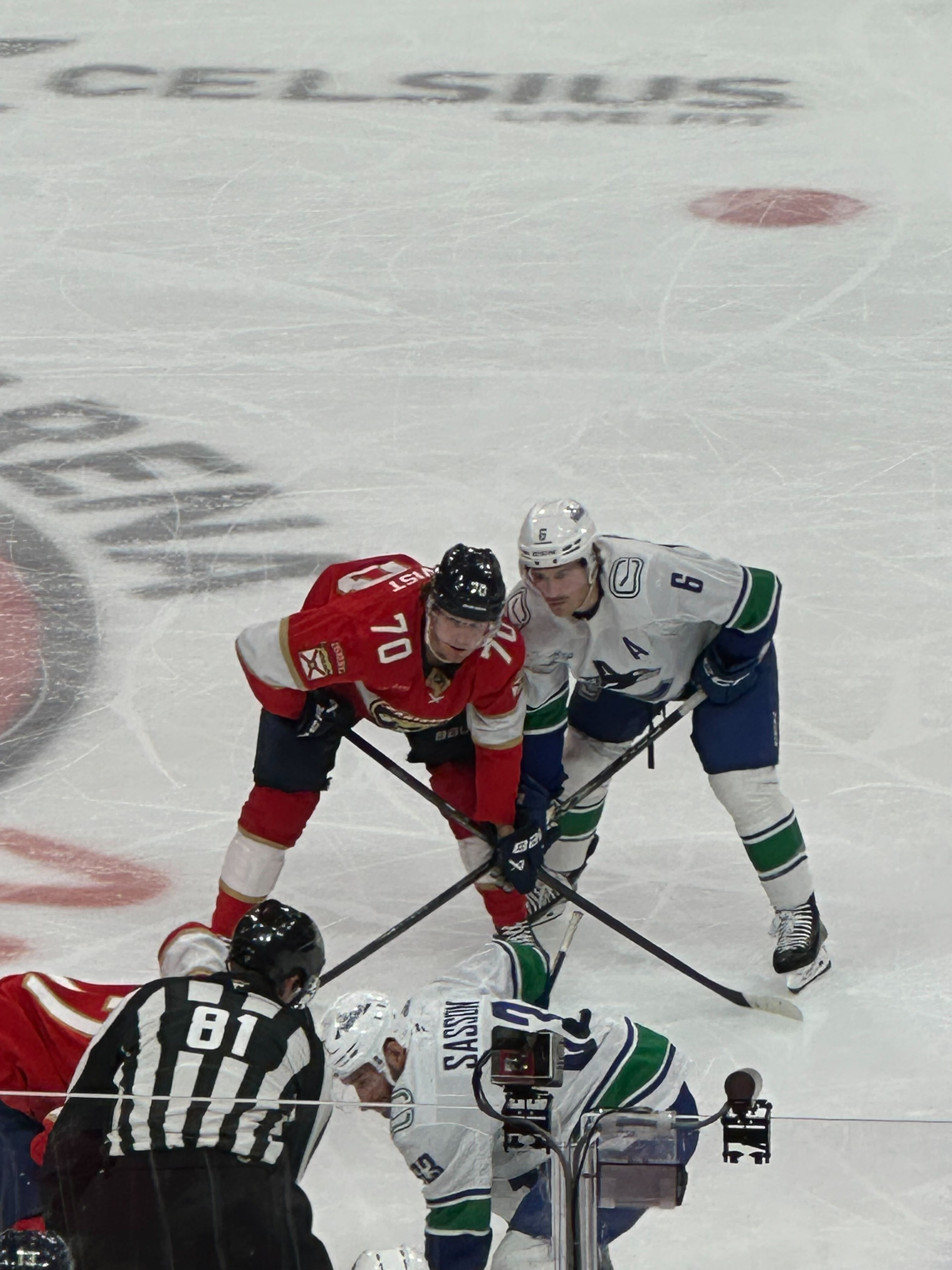
Boeser waits for a faceoff in a game against the Florida Panthers in November 2025

On September 16, 2019, following the expiry of his entry-level contract after the previous season, Boeser signed a three-year, $17.625 million contract to remain with Vancouver. However, his season was cut short in February 2020, due to a rib injury that was expected to take him eight weeks to recover. Boeser returned from his injury for the final game of the Canucks' regular season on March 10, 2020, against the New York Islanders. In the 2020 Stanley Cup playoffs, Boeser recorded four goals and 11 points in 17 games, with his first playoff goal going against his hometown Minnesota Wild, as the Canucks made it within a win of the Western Conference final.

On July 1, 2022, Boeser signed a three-year, $19.95 million contract with Vancouver.

On October 11, 2023, Boeser scored four goals and recorded his first NHL career natural hat trick in the season-opening game against the Edmonton Oilers. On December 12, against the Tampa Bay Lightning, he recorded a second natural hat trick and became the first Canucks player since Petri Skriko in 1986–87 to record at least two natural hat tricks during the season. On January 13, 2024, Boeser was named an NHL All-Star for the second time in his career. On January 27, 2024, Boeser would score his 30th goal of the season against the Columbus Blue Jackets, surpassing his previous best of 29 goals during his rookie year. On April 8, 2024, Boeser would reach the 40 goal mark for the first time in his career in a game against the Vegas Golden Knights, becoming the 10th player in franchise history to reach the milestone and the first Canuck player since Ryan Kesler and Daniel Sedin in the 2010-11 season to do so. In the first round of the 2024 Stanley Cup playoffs on April 28, 2024, Boeser recorded his first career playoff hat trick during Game 4 against the Nashville Predators to tie the game in its dying seconds, becoming the first Canuck player to achieve a playoff hat trick since Trevor Linden in the 1996 Stanley Cup playoffs. A blood clotting issue discovered after Game 6 against the Edmonton Oilers would force Boeser to miss the remainder of the playoffs, as the Canucks would be eliminated by the Oilers in Game 7. Boeser finished the postseason with seven goals and 12 points in as many games played, tied with J.T. Miller for the team lead in playoff scoring.

On July 1, 2025, Boeser re-signed with Vancouver through a seven-year, $7.25 million AAV contract.

== International play ==
Medal record

Men's ice hockey

Representing the United States

World Junior Championship
Bronze medal – third place	2016 Finland	

Boeser has played with the United States national junior team, first at the 2014 Ivan Hlinka Memorial Tournament and later with the United States junior select team at the 2014 World Junior A Challenge.

His first International Ice Hockey Federation (IIHF)-sanctioned tournament was the 2016 World Junior Championships, where he had three points in seven games as the United States won the bronze medal. He missed the 2017 World Junior Championships due to a wrist injury.

== Personal life ==
Boeser, who grew up in Burnsville, Minnesota, is the youngest of three children to Duke and Laurie Boeser; he has a half brother and a sister, who has a developmental disability. Boeser's father was diagnosed with Parkinson's disease in 2010; he would also have a severe brain injury from a car accident a few years later, forcing him to stop working. To help support the family Boeser's mother worked up to three jobs, including serving in a restaurant, office administration, and preparing tax returns. In August 2014, while Boeser was in Slovakia for the Ivan Hlinka Memorial Tournament, a tragic car accident south of Minneapolis–St. Paul killed one of his closest friends and severely injured another, both fellow students and athletes at Burnsville High School. This followed the death of his grandfather prior to his first game in the USHL. Boeser's father died on May 26, 2022.

== Career statistics ==
=== Regular season and playoffs ===
			Regular season					Playoffs
Season	Team	League	GP	G	A	Pts	PIM	GP	G	A	Pts	PIM
2012–13	Burnsville High School	MSHSL	16	12	17	29	4	3	0	5	5	2
2013–14	Burnsville High School	MSHSL	24	21	25	46	25	2	2	2	4	0
2013–14	Sioux City Musketeers	USHL	8	3	1	4	2	8	1	0	1	0
2014–15	Waterloo Black Hawks	USHL	57	35	33	68	30	—	—	—	—	—
2015–16	University of North Dakota	NCHC	42	27	33	60	26	—	—	—	—	—
2016–17	University of North Dakota	NCHC	32	16	18	34	24	—	—	—	—	—
2016–17	Vancouver Canucks	NHL	9	4	1	5	0	—	—	—	—	—
2017–18	Vancouver Canucks	NHL	62	29	26	55	16	—	—	—	—	—
2018–19	Vancouver Canucks	NHL	69	26	30	56	22	—	—	—	—	—
2019–20	Vancouver Canucks	NHL	57	16	29	45	14	17	4	7	11	10
2020–21	Vancouver Canucks	NHL	56	23	26	49	16	—	—	—	—	—
2021–22	Vancouver Canucks	NHL	71	23	23	46	20	—	—	—	—	—
2022–23	Vancouver Canucks	NHL	74	18	37	55	24	—	—	—	—	—
2023–24	Vancouver Canucks	NHL	81	40	33	73	14	12	7	5	12	8
2024–25	Vancouver Canucks	NHL	75	25	25	50	16	—	—	—	—	—
2025–26	Vancouver Canucks	NHL	75	22	26	48	8	—	—	—	—	—
NHL totals			629	226	256	482	150	29	11	12	23	18

=== International ===
Year	Team	Event	Result	GP	G	A	Pts	PIM
2014	United States	IH18	3rd place, bronze medalist(s)	5	6	2	8	10
2014	United States	WJAC	1st place, gold medalist(s)	4	4	1	5	6
2016	United States	WJC	3rd place, bronze medalist(s)	7	1	2	3	2
Junior totals				12	7	4	11	12

== Awards and honors ==
Award	Year	Ref
USHL
All-Rookie Team	2015	
First All-Star Team	2015	
College
NCHC Rookie of the Year	2015-16	
NCHC First All-Star Team	2015-16	
NCHC All Rookie Team	2015-16	
NCHC Three Stars Award	2015-16	
AHCA All-American West First Team	2015-16	
NCAA All-Tournament Team	2016	
NHL
Rookie of the Month	November 2018, December 2018	
NHL All-Rookie Team	2018	
NHL All-Star Game	2018, 2024	
NHL All-Star Game SuperSkills Accuracy winner	2018	
NHL All-Star Game Tournament MVP	2018	
Vancouver Canucks
Cyclone Taylor Trophy	2018	
Cyrus H. McLean Trophy	2018, 2021	
Pavel Bure Most Exciting Player Award	2018	

Awards and achievements
Preceded by Jared McCann	Vancouver Canucks first-round draft pick 2015	Succeeded by Olli Juolevi
Preceded by Danton Heinen	NCHC Rookie of the Year; 2015–16	Succeeded by Henrik Borgström
Preceded by Award created	NCHC Three Stars Award; 2015–16	Succeeded by Ben Blacker
