= Team Brock =

There are several Australian motor racing teams which have been called Team Brock.

- Paul Weel Racing - Team Brock identity from 2003.
- Rod Nash Racing - Team Brock identity from 2002.
- Team Brock (1976) - Short lived Group C team from 1976/77.
- Team Brock (Procar) - Team run by James Brock in Nations Cup and V8 Utes.

== See also ==
Peter Brock
