= Brok =

Brok may refer to:

== Places in Poland ==
- Gmina Brok, a district in Ostrów County, Masovian Voivodeship
- Brok, Masovian Voivodeship, a town in Ostrów County, Masovian Voivodeship
- Brok, Podlaskie Voivodeship, a village in Wysokie Mazowieckie County, Podlaskie Voivodeship
- Brok River, a tributary of the Bug River in Puszcza Biała

== People ==
=== Surname ===
- Bronisław Brok, Polish director who made the 1959 film Octopus Cafe
- Elmar Brok (born 1946), German Member of the European Parliament
- Janne Brok (born 1987), Dutch cyclist with the UCI team Vrienden van het Platteland
- Pyotr Brok, finance minister of Russia, 1852–1858
- tom Brok family, powerful East Frisian line of chieftains
  - Ocko I tom Brok (about 1345–1389), chieftain of the Brokmerland and the Auricherland
  - Ocko II tom Brok (1407–1435), chieftain of the Brokmerland and the Auricherland

=== Given name ===
- Brok Harris (born 1985), South African rugby union footballer
- Brok Windsor, character in a Canadian comic book

== Other ==
- BROK the InvestiGator, a video game
- BROK, a brand of beer brewed by Browar Koszalin in Poland

== See also ==
- Brock (disambiguation)
- Broks, a surname, including a list of people with the name
