= Anthony Angello =

American ice hockey player (born 1996)

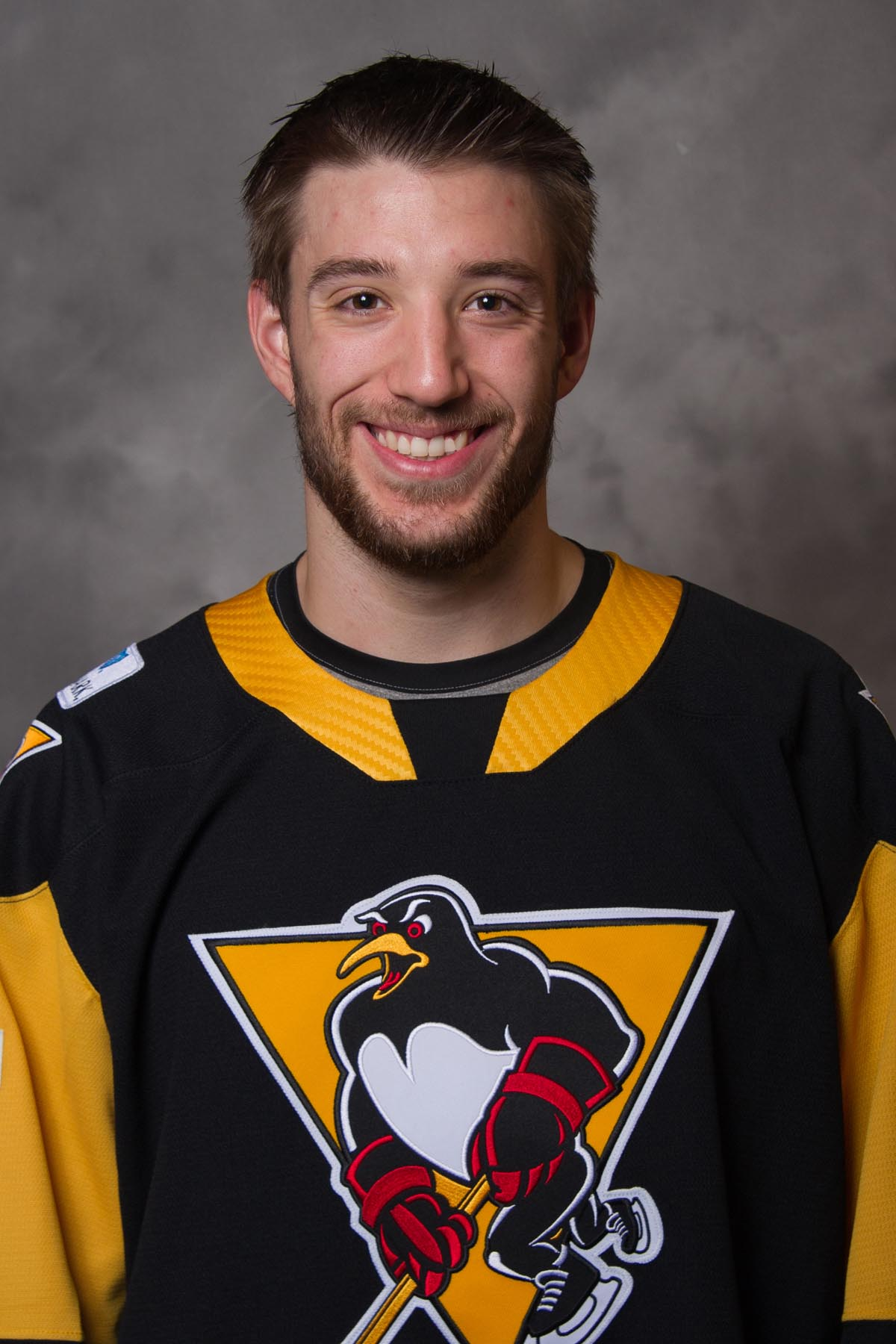
- Angello with the Wilkes-Barre/Scranton Penguins in 2019
- Born: March 6, 1996 (age 30) Albany, New York, U.S.
- Height: 6 ft 5 in (196 cm)
- Weight: 210 lb (95 kg; 15 st 0 lb)
- Position: Forward
- Shot: Right
- Played for: Pittsburgh Penguins
- NHL draft: 145th overall, 2014; Pittsburgh Penguins
- Playing career: 2018–2025

Anthony Angello (born March 6, 1996) is an American former professional ice hockey forward. Although he spent most of his professional career playing in the American Hockey League (AHL), Angello also played for the Pittsburgh Penguins of the National Hockey League (NHL).

== Early life ==
Angello was born on March 6, 1996, in Albany, New York to parents David and Pamela Angello. His family moved to Manlius when he was four and he was drawn to play hockey by his uncle, Jason Hover, who played hockey at Air Force Academy. Growing up, he played basketball, lacrosse, and hockey but committed to solely hockey as a freshman in high school.

== Playing career ==
Angello attended Fayetteville-Manlius High School from 2011 to 2013 and played for both the Syracuse Jr. Stars and the public high school team. He scored over 120 points in two high school seasons and was nearly a point-per-game producer for the Stars in his first year. In his sophomore season, Angello was selected by the Sault Ste. Marie Greyhounds in the 15th round of the 2012 Ontario Hockey League (OHL) Priority Draft. Despite his selection, Angello committed to play NCAA Division I ice hockey for the Cornell Big Red men's ice hockey team over opportunities at Harvard, Yale, and Colgate. He was also selected by the Omaha Lancers in the fifth round of the 2013 United States Hockey League (USHL) Entry Draft and participated in the USA Hockey Select 17 festival.

Angello played two seasons with the Lancers before being selected by the Pittsburgh Penguins in the fifth round, 145th overall, of the 2014 NHL entry draft. Angello played college hockey at Cornell University in the ECAC Hockey conference from 2015 to 2018. During the 2019–20 season, Angello made his NHL debut on January 31, 2020, in Pittsburgh's 4–3 overtime win over the Philadelphia Flyers. He later recorded his first career NHL goal and assist a few games later on February 18 in a 5–2 win over the Toronto Maple Leafs. Angello was not expected to play that night but was a last minute substitution for an ill Evgeni Malkin. He concluded his sophomore season with the Penguins organization recording 25 points in 48 games with their AHL affiliate and signed a two-year two-way contract extension worth $725,000 annually.

On July 14, 2022, Angello having left the Penguins as a free agent was signed to a one-year, two-way contract with the St. Louis Blues. Assigned to the Blues AHL affiliate, the Springfield Thunderbirds for the 2022–23 season, Angello in a third-line forward role added 6 goals and 11 points through 45 games. On March 8, 2023, Angello was traded by the Blues to the Nashville Predators in exchange for future considerations.

After spending most of the 2024–25 season in the AHL for the Milwaukee Admirals, on February 26, 2025, the Predators traded Angello to the Tampa Bay Lightning in exchange for Jesse Ylönen.

In October 2025, Angello announced his retirement from professional hockey. He declared on his social media that he would be finishing a degree from Cornell University.

== Career statistics ==
			Regular season					Playoffs
Season	Team	League	GP	G	A	Pts	PIM	GP	G	A	Pts	PIM
2011–12	Syracuse Jr. Stars	EmJHL	36	11	21	32	18	4	0	1	1	4
2012–13	Syracuse Jr. Stars	EmJHL	40	31	29	60	60	3	1	3	4	2
2013–14	Omaha Lancers	USHL	58	11	10	21	85	4	0	1	1	4
2014–15	Omaha Lancers	USHL	56	19	16	35	90	3	1	1	2	4
2015–16	Cornell University	ECAC	34	11	13	24	26	—	—	—	—	—
2016–17	Cornell University	ECAC	35	12	8	20	51	—	—	—	—	—
2017–18	Cornell University	ECAC	33	13	13	26	42	—	—	—	—	—
2017–18	Wilkes-Barre/Scranton Penguins	AHL	2	0	0	0	0	2	2	0	2	2
2018–19	Wilkes-Barre/Scranton Penguins	AHL	65	16	13	29	53	—	—	—	—	—
2019–20	Wilkes-Barre/Scranton Penguins	AHL	48	16	9	25	55	—	—	—	—	—
2019–20	Pittsburgh Penguins	NHL	8	1	0	1	4	—	—	—	—	—
2020–21	Wilkes-Barre/Scranton Penguins	AHL	19	6	4	10	15	—	—	—	—	—
2020–21	Pittsburgh Penguins	NHL	19	2	2	4	8	—	—	—	—	—
2021–22	Wilkes-Barre/Scranton Penguins	AHL	44	7	12	19	27	5	0	1	1	4
2021–22	Pittsburgh Penguins	NHL	4	0	0	0	2	—	—	—	—	—
2022–23	Springfield Thunderbirds	AHL	45	6	5	11	65	—	—	—	—	—
2022–23	Milwaukee Admirals	AHL	17	7	5	12	22	16	1	2	3	28
2023–24	Milwaukee Admirals	AHL	46	3	10	13	42	—	—	—	—	—
2024–25	Milwaukee Admirals	AHL	41	7	7	14	28	—	—	—	—	—
2024–25	Syracuse Crunch	AHL	19	4	6	10	20	3	0	0	0	4
NHL totals			31	3	2	5	14	—	—	—	—	—
AHL totals			339	72	71	143	327	26	3	3	6	38

== Awards and honors ==
Award	Year
USHL
Scholar-Athlete Award	2014
College
All-Ivy League Second Team	2018
ECAC Second All-Star Team	2018
