= Le Broc =

Le Broc may refer to the following places in France:

- Le Broc, Alpes-Maritimes, a commune in the department of Alpes-Maritimes
- Le Broc, Puy-de-Dôme, a commune in the department of Puy-de-Dôme
