= Karl Brocks =

- Born: 29 January 1912
- Died: 29 May 1972 (aged 60)
- Awards: Knight's Cross of the Iron Cross

Karl Adolf Christian Brocks (29 January 1912 – 29 May 1972) was a German meteorologist who was a member of the Geophysical (later Meteorological) Institute of Hamburg University. In 1960 he was appointed full professor and head of the Institute. During World War II, he served in the Wehrmacht and was a recipient of the Knight's Cross of the Iron Cross of Nazi Germany.

== World War II awards ==
- Knight's Cross of the Iron Cross on 30 September 1944 as Hauptmann of the Reserves and regimental adjutant of Grenadier-Regiment 123
