= Brock Motors =

Brock Motors Ltd. (formerly Stansell Motors Ltd.), was founded by William Riley Stansell in 1921 in Amherstberg, Ontario, Canada. The factory had previously been home to the Amherst car. The company announced that it intended to build 10,000 vehicles per year. Financial backing for the project was based on a share float for 2,000 stockholders. Before production started Stansell Motors was renamed as Brock Motors Ltd and only one car was ever produced, the Brock Six, a large five-passenger touring car powered by a 55 bhp Continental engine. The company closed in 1921.

Stansell moved to London, Ontario in 1921, where he manufactured the London Six.
