= Nikolai Chebykin =

Russian professional ice hockey forward

- Born: 1 August 1997 (age 29) Chita, Zabaykalsky Krai, Russia
- Height: 6 ft 4 in (193 cm)
- Weight: 209 lb (95 kg; 14 st 13 lb)
- Position: Forward
- Shoots: Left
- KHL team Former teams: SKA Saint Petersburg; Dynamo Moscow; Salavat Yulaev Ufa; Spartak Moscow; Admiral Vladivostok; HC Sochi; Severstal Cherepovets
- NHL draft: 182nd overall, 2016; Toronto Maple Leafs
- Playing career: 2016–present

Nikolai Vladimirovich Chebykin (Russian: Никола́й Владимирович Чебыкин; born 1 August 1997 in Chita, Zabaykalsky Krai, Russia) is a Russian professional ice hockey forward currently playing for SKA Saint Petersburg of the Kontinental Hockey League (KHL). Chebykin was selected in the seventh-round, 182nd overall by the Toronto Maple Leafs in the 2016 NHL entry draft.

== Playing career ==
Chebykin played as a youth within the junior program of HC Dynamo Moscow, before making his KHL debut with Dynamo in the 2016–17 season, appearing in 8 games for 1 goal.

Out of contract with Dynamo, Chebykin signed a two-year pact with SKA Saint Petersburg prior to the 2017–18 season. He played in just 3 games with affiliate, SKA-Neva of the VHL, before he was released from his contract on October 20, 2017. He played out the remainder of the season with HC Dinamo Saint Petersburg, rebounding with 18 points in 32 regular season games. He contributed with 12 points in 20 post season games to help Dinamo claim the Petrov Cup.

On May 3, 2018, Chebykin was signed to a two-year KHL contract with Salavat Yulaev Ufa, continuing his development with VHL Affiliate, Toros Neftekamsk, into the 2018–19 season.

Prior to the commencement of the 2022–23 season, Chebykin was traded by Spartak Moscow to his fourth KHL club, Admiral Vladivostok in exchange for Yegor Chezganov on 29 August 2022.

During the 2023–24 season, Chebykin posted just 2 goals and 6 points in 33 games before he was traded to HC Sochi, in exchange for Dmitry Zavgorodniy and Kirill Petkov on 4 December 2023. In an increased offensive role, Chebykin regain his scoring touch and finished with 18 points through 29 contests with Sochi.

After part of two seasons with Severstal Cherepovets, Chebykin left as a free agent and was signed to a two-year contract with SKA Saint Petersburg on 18 June 2026.

== Career statistics ==
=== Regular season and playoffs ===
			Regular season					Playoffs
Season	Team	League	GP	G	A	Pts	PIM	GP	G	A	Pts	PIM
2014–15	HK MVD Balashikha	MHL	32	2	4	6	55	6	0	0	0	2
2015–16	HK MVD Balashikha	MHL	39	13	22	35	59	—	—	—	—	—
2016–17	HK MVD Balashikha	MHL	17	17	10	27	42	—	—	—	—	—
2016–17	Dynamo Moscow	KHL	8	1	0	1	0	1	0	0	0	0
2016–17	Dynamo Balashikha	VHL	24	5	3	8	22	15	3	6	9	41
2017–18	SKA-1946	MHL	2	1	2	3	4	—	—	—	—	—
2017–18	SKA-Neva	VHL	3	0	2	2	4	—	—	—	—	—
2017–18	Dinamo Saint Petersburg	VHL	32	9	9	18	22	20	5	7	12	26
2018–19	Salavat Yulaev Ufa	KHL	3	0	0	0	2	—	—	—	—	—
2018–19	Toros Neftekamsk	VHL	38	8	6	14	55	15	2	3	5	10
2019–20	Toros Neftekamsk	VHL	31	5	12	17	55	—	—	—	—	—
2019–20	Traktor Chelyabinsk	KHL	2	0	0	0	0	—	—	—	—	—
2019–20	Chelmet Chelyabinsk	VHL	13	0	1	1	10	—	—	—	—	—
2020–21	Chelmet Chelyabinsk	VHL	4	0	3	3	4	—	—	—	—	—
2020–21	Dynamo Krasnogorsk	VHL	24	4	8	12	49	5	0	1	1	2
2021–22	Dynamo Moscow	KHL	16	6	1	7	8	—	—	—	—	—
2021–22	Spartak Moscow	KHL	18	2	2	4	4	—	—	—	—	—
2021–22	Khimik Voskresensk	VHL	7	1	3	4	4	2	0	0	0	4
2022–23	Admiral Vladivostok	KHL	63	14	12	26	37	12	2	2	4	6
2023–24	Admiral Vladivostok	KHL	33	2	4	6	12	—	—	—	—	—
2023–24	HC Sochi	KHL	29	6	12	18	12	—	—	—	—	—
2024–25	HC Sochi	KHL	25	1	7	8	16	—	—	—	—	—
2024–25	Severstal Cherepovets	KHL	30	10	10	20	8	5	2	0	2	7
2025–26	Severstal Cherepovets	KHL	49	8	20	28	16	3	0	0	0	9
KHL totals			276	50	68	118	115	21	4	2	6	22

=== International ===
Year	Team	Event	Result	GP	G	A	Pts	PIM
2015	Russia	WJC18	5th	5	0	0	0	6
Junior totals				5	0	0	0	6

== Awards and honors ==
Award	Year
VHL
Petrov Cup (Dynamo Balashikha)	2017
Petrov Cup (HC Dinamo Saint Petersburg)	2018
