= Rolands Broks =

Latvian politician (born 1969)

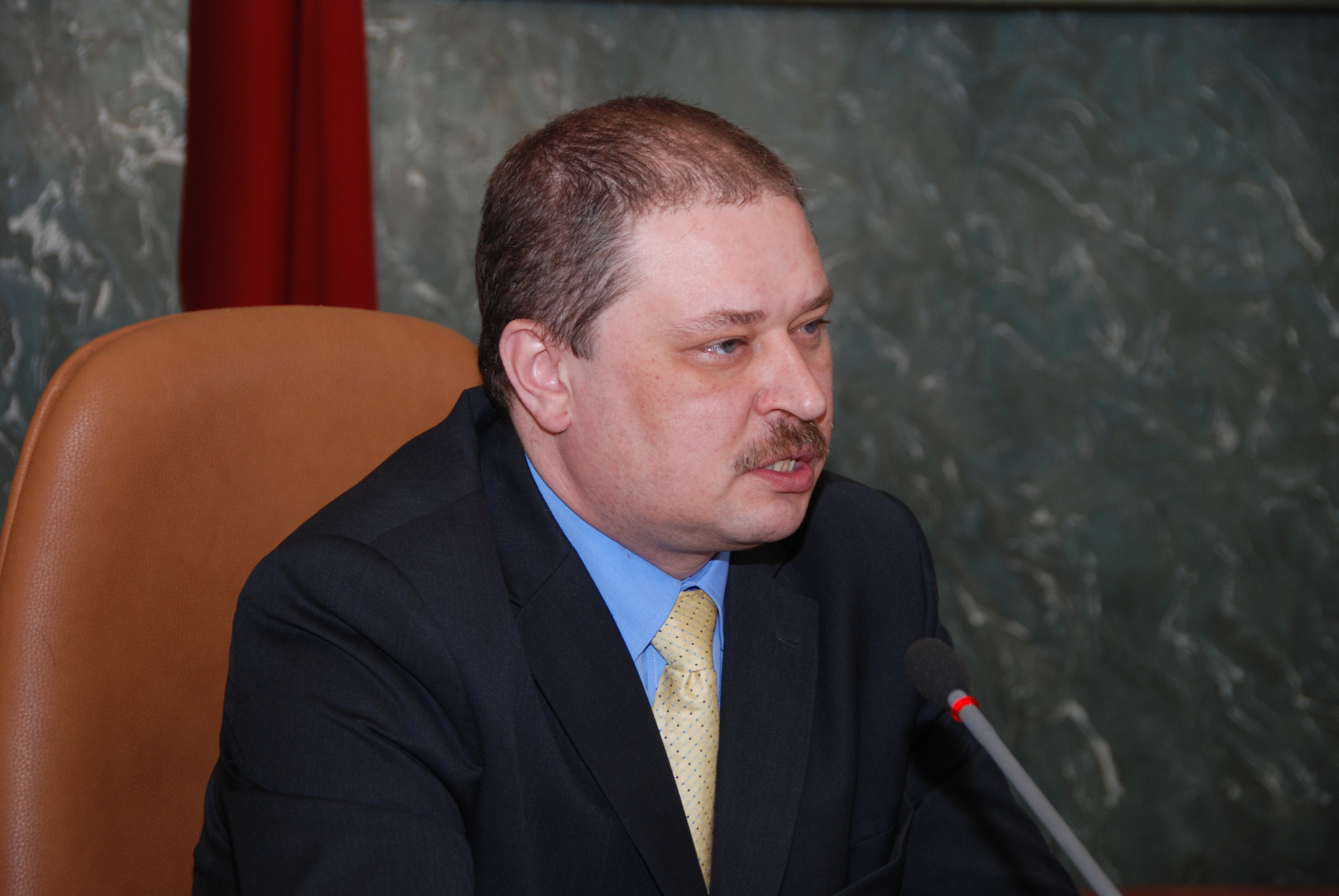
Rolands Broks

Rolands Broks (born 18 May 1969) is a Latvian politician, member of the Latvian Farmers' Union party and was the Minister of Education and Science of Latvia from 3 November 2010 to 25 October 2011.

In July 2002, he became legal advisor to Dagnija Staķe, Minister of Welfare; in 2004, he became a member of the advisory board of the State Social Insurance Agency; and in July 2006, he became legal advisor to Baiba Rivža, Minister of Education and Science. In December 2007, he became Parliamentary Secretary of the Ministry of Education and Science. On January 22, 2008, he suspended the operations of the law firm “Broks & Partners.”

Broks ran in the 2009 Riga City Council elections on the Union of Greens and Farmers (ZZS) ticket, but the party failed to secure the required 5% of the vote and he was not elected. On October 2, 2010, R. Broks ran in the 10th Saeima elections on the ZZS ticket but was not elected.[

On November 3, the 10th Saeima approved Valdis Dombrovskis’s second government, in which R. Broks became Minister of Education and Science. Concurrently, he served as Chairman of the Latvian National Sports Council, a member of the Cabinet of Ministers’ Awards Council, and Vice President of the Latvian National Commission for UNESCO.

He later ran unsuccessfully in the 2011 elections for the 11th Saeima, the 2013 Riga City Council elections, the 2020 special Riga City Council elections, and the 2022 elections for the 14th Saeima.
