= 2016 ECAC Hockey men's ice hockey tournament =

2016 ECAC Men's ice hockey tournament
- Dates: March 4–19, 2016
- Teams: 12
- Finals site: Herb Brooks Arena; Lake Placid, New York
- Champions: Quinnipiac (1st title)
- Winning coach: Rand Pecknold (1st title)
- MVP: Connor Clifton (Quinnipiac)
- ECAC Men's Ice Hockey Tournaments

The 2016 ECAC Hockey Men's Ice Hockey Tournament is the 55th tournament in league history. It was played between March 4 and March 19, 2016. First Round and Quarterfinal games were played at home team campus sites, while the final four games were played at the Herb Brooks Arena in Lake Placid, New York. By winning the tournament, the team receives the ECAC's automatic bid to the 2016 NCAA Division I Men's Ice Hockey Tournament.

== Format ==
The tournament features four rounds of play. The teams that finish above fifth place in the standings receive a bye to the quarterfinal round. In the first round, the fifth and twelfth seeds, the sixth and eleventh seeds, the seventh and tenth seeds and the eighth and ninth seeds played a best-of-three series with the winners advancing to the quarterfinals. In the quarterfinals the one seed plays the lowest remaining seed, the second seed plays the second-lowest remaining seed, the third seed plays the third-lowest remaining seed and the fourth seed plays the fourth-lowest remaining seed another best-of-three series with the winners of these the series advancing to the Semifinals. In the semifinals the top remaining seed plays the lowest remaining seed while the two remaining teams play against each other. The winners of the semifinals play in the championship game, and no third-place game is played. All series after the quarterfinals are single-elimination games. The tournament champion receives an automatic bid to the 2016 NCAA Division I Men's Ice Hockey Tournament.

== Conference standings ==
Note: GP = Games played; W = Wins; L = Losses; T = Ties; PTS = Points; GF = Goals For; GA = Goals Against

2015–16 ECAC Hockey men's standings
| | Conference record | | | | | | | Overall record | | | | | |
| | GP | W | L | T | PTS | GF | GA | GP | W | L | T | GF | GA |
|---|---|---|---|---|---|---|---|---|---|---|---|---|---|
| #2 Quinnipiac † * | 22 | 16 | 1 | 5 | 37 | 84 | 44 | 43 | 32 | 4 | 7 | 163 | 85 |
| #10 Yale | 22 | 14 | 5 | 3 | 31 | 57 | 37 | 32 | 19 | 9 | 4 | 86 | 57 |
| #9 Harvard | 22 | 12 | 6 | 4 | 28 | 72 | 47 | 34 | 19 | 11 | 4 | 116 | 81 |
| #17 St. Lawrence | 22 | 11 | 8 | 3 | 25 | 68 | 50 | 37 | 19 | 14 | 4 | 106 | 84 |
| Clarkson | 22 | 10 | 9 | 3 | 23 | 52 | 51 | 38 | 20 | 15 | 3 | 101 | 95 |
| Rensselaer | 22 | 8 | 7 | 7 | 23 | 47 | 49 | 40 | 18 | 15 | 7 | 97 | 104 |
| Dartmouth | 22 | 11 | 11 | 0 | 22 | 60 | 69 | 35 | 18 | 16 | 1 | 94 | 104 |
| #18 Cornell | 22 | 8 | 8 | 6 | 22 | 46 | 50 | 34 | 16 | 11 | 7 | 79 | 82 |
| Union | 22 | 6 | 10 | 6 | 18 | 53 | 62 | 36 | 13 | 14 | 9 | 91 | 96 |
| Colgate | 22 | 6 | 14 | 2 | 14 | 45 | 71 | 37 | 11 | 24 | 2 | 95 | 132 |
| Brown | 22 | 3 | 13 | 6 | 12 | 47 | 70 | 31 | 5 | 19 | 7 | 75 | 107 |
| Princeton | 22 | 3 | 16 | 3 | 9 | 40 | 71 | 31 | 5 | 23 | 3 | 60 | 99 |
Championship: March 19, 2016 † indicates conference regular season champion (Cleary Cup) * indicates conference tournament champion (Whitelaw Cup); Rankings: USCHO.com Top 20 Poll; updated March 8, 2016

== Bracket ==
Teams are reseeded after the First Round and Quarterfinals

First Round; March 4–6
5 | Clarkson | 3** | 3* | –
12 | Princeton | 2 | 2 | –
6 | Rensselaer | 3 | 4 | –
11 | Brown | 2 | 3 | –
7 | Dartmouth | 3* | 3 | 4**
10 | Colgate | 2 | 5 | 3
8 | Cornell | 1 | 2* | –
9 | Union | 0 | 1 | –

Quarterfinals; March 11–13
1 | Quinnipiac | 5 | 4 | 6
8 | Cornell | 2 | 5 | 3
2 | Yale | 3 | 1 | –
7 | Dartmouth | 4* | 2 | –
3 | Harvard | 5 | 8 | –
6 | Rensselaer | 2 | 2 | –
4 | St. Lawrence | 3* | 3** | –
5 | Clarkson | 2 | 2 | –

Semifinals; March 18
1 | Quinnipiac | 3
7 | Dartmouth | 1
3 | Harvard | 2*
4 | St. Lawrence | 1

Championship; March 19
1 | Quinnipiac | 4
3 | Harvard | 1

Note: * denotes overtime period(s)

== Results ==
=== First round ===
==== (5) Clarkson vs. (12) Princeton ====
| March 4 | Clarkson | 3 – 2 | 2OT | Princeton | Cheel Arena | Recap |
| No scoring | | First period | | 05:35 - Alex Riche (Véronneau, Pompi) |
| No scoring | | Second period | | 09:46 - Ryan Siiro (Rankin, Pompi) |
| (Amorosa, Boucher) Kelly Summers - PP - 13:53 (Amorosa, Boucher) Sam Vigneault - PP EA - 19:38 | | Third period | | No scoring |
| (Di Nallo, Josephs) James de Haas - GW - 01:05 | | Second overtime period | | No scoring |
| ( 29 saves / 31 shots ) Greg Lewis | | Goalie stats | | Colton Phinney ( 43 saves / 46 shots ) |

| March 5 | Clarkson | 3 – 2 | OT | Princeton | Cheel Arena | Recap |
| (D'Arrisso, Dalpe) Aaron Thow - 04:34 (Di Nallo, Gareau) Simon Bessette - 09:41 | | First period | | No scoring |
| No scoring | | Second period | | 10:45 - Max Véronneau (Riche, Kuffner) |
| No scoring | | Third period | | 01:59 - Ben Foster (Pomeroy, Grabowski) |
| (Di Nallo) James de Haas - GW - 17:23 | | First overtime period | | No scoring |
| ( 31 saves / 33 shots ) Greg Lewis | | Goalie stats | | Colton Phinney ( 44 saves / 47 shots ) |

| Clarkson won series 2–0 |

==== (6) Rensselaer vs. (11) Brown ====
| March 4 | Rensselaer | 3 – 2 | Brown | Houston Field House | Recap |
| (Gillespie, Rodriguez) Meirs Moore - 07:37 | | First period | No scoring |
| (Bourbonnais, Schroeder) Mike Prapavessis - 19:16 | | Second period | 02:57 - Max Willman (Corcoran, Gottlieb) |
| (Prapavessis, Bourbonnais) Jared Wilson - GW PP - 02:39 | | Third period | 07:04 - Charlie Corcoran (Lafferty, Marchin) |
| ( 33 saves / 35 shots ) Jason Kasdorf | | Goalie stats | Tim Ernst ( 20 saves / 23 shots ) |

| March 5 | Rensselaer | 4 – 3 | Brown | Houston Field House | Recap |
| No Scoring | | First period | 07:25 - PP - Sam Lafferty (Corcoran, Willman); 10:14 - Nick Lappin (Naclerio, Marchin); 19:32 - PP - Tyler Bird (Willman, Corcoran) |
| (Prapavessis, Kasdorf) Miloš Bubela - 00:30 (DeVito, Liljegren) Miloš Bubela - 08:04 | | Second period | No scoring |
| (Bubela, Wilson) Riley Bourbonnais - PP - 09:27 (Wood) Jared Wilson - GW - 18:18 | | Third period | No scoring |
| ( 33 saves / 36 shots ) Jason Kasdorf | | Goalie stats | Tim Ernst ( 27 saves / 31 shots ) |

| Rensselaer won series 2–0 |

==== (7) Dartmouth vs. (10) Colgate ====
| March 4 | Dartmouth | 3 – 2 | OT | Colgate | Thompson Arena | Recap |
| (Crema, Bligh) Brad Schierhorn - 10:47 | | First period | | No scoring |
| No scoring | | Second period | | 13:20 - Tylor Spink (Tys. Spink); 18:04 - Emilio Audi (Borkowski, Citron) |
| (Bligh, Crema) Brad Schierhorn - 09:02 | | Third period | | No scoring |
| (Yau, Hesler) Brad Schierhorn - GW - 10:59 | | First overtime period | | No scoring |
| ( 20 saves / 22 shots ) James Kruger | | Goalie stats | | Charlie Finn ( 35 saves / 38 shots ) |

| March 5 | Dartmouth | 3 – 5 | Colgate | Thompson Arena | Recap |
| (Opperman, Kilistoff) Connor Yau - 03:37 | | First period | No scoring |
| (Bligh, Yau) Brett Patterson - PP - 16:17 | | Second period | 04:14 - Willie Brooks (Audi, Freeman); 08:49 - Mike Borkowski (Murphy); 13:03 - Evan Peterson (Borkowski, Murphy) |
| (Hartley, Ernsting) Alex Jasiek - 17:23 | | Third period | 10:41 - PP GW - Darcy Murphy (Tyl. Spink, Corkey); 18:19 - EN - Tyson Spink (Corkey) |
| ( 24 saves / 28 shots ) James Kruger | | Goalie stats | Charlie Finn ( 40 saves / 43 shots ) |

| March 6 | Dartmouth | 4 – 3 | 2OT | Colgate | Thompson Arena | Recap |
| (Opperman) Carl Hesler - 08:58 | | First period | | 03:35 - Tylor Spink (unassisted) |
| No scoring | | Second period | | No scoring |
| (O'Brien) Josh Hartley - SH - 04:23 (Schierhorn, Crema) Nick Bligh - 08:05 | | Third period | | 04:06 - Tim Harrison (Tyl. Spink, Borkowski); 07:06 - Derek Freeman (Audi, Corkey) |
| (Ernsting, Jasiek) Tim O'Brien - GW - 04:37 | | Second overtime period | | No scoring |
| ( 24 saves / 28 shots ) James Kruger | | Goalie stats | | Charlie Finn ( 40 saves / 43 shots ) |

| Dartmouth won series 2–1 |

==== (8) Cornell vs. (9) Union ====
| March 4 | Cornell | 1 – 0 | Union | Lynah Rink | Recap |
| No scoring | | First period | No scoring |
| No scoring | | Second period | No scoring |
| (Vanderlaan, Kubiak) Holden Anderson - GW - 13:48 | | Third period | No scoring |
| ( 27 saves / 27 shots ) Mitch Gillam | | Goalie stats | Alex Sakellaropoulos ( 21 saves / 22 shots ) |

| March 5 | Cornell | 2 – 1 | OT | Union | Lynah Rink | Recap |
| No scoring | | First period | | No scoring |
| (Vanderlaan, Angello) Ryan Bliss - 10:25 | | Second period | | No scoring |
| No scoring | | Third period | | 10:56 - PP - Matt Wilkins (Supinski, Vecchione) |
| (Hilbrich, Yates) Matt Buckles - GW - 03:18 | | First overtime period | | No scoring |
| ( 32 saves / 33 shots ) Mitch Gillam | | Goalie stats | | Alex Sakellaropoulos ( 26 saves / 28 shots ) |

| Cornell won series 2–0 |

=== Quarterfinals ===
==== (1) Quinnipiac vs. (8) Cornell ====
| March 11 | Quinnipiac | 5 – 2 | Cornell | TD Bank Sports Center | Recap |
| (St. Denis, C. Clifton) Landon Smith - 08:59 | | First period | 03:23 - Jake Weidner (Freschi, Knisley) |
| (C. Clifton, Anas) Travis St. Denis - 00:30 (C. Clifton, MacMaster) Thomas Aldworth - GW - 02:10 (Anas, St. Denis) Landon Smith - PP - 18:08 | | Second period | 10:15 - PP - Jeff Kubiak (Angello) |
| (Tiefenwerth, McKernan) Soren Jonzzon - EN - 18:36 | | Third period | No scoring |
| ( 16 saves / 18 shots ) Michael Garteig | | Goalie stats | Mitch Gillam ( 36 saves / 40 shots ) |

| March 12 | Quinnipiac | 4 – 5 | Cornell | TD Bank Sports Center | Recap |
| (L. Smith) Chase Priskie - 13:47 (Taverner, Tiefenwerth) Tommy Schutt - 14:18 | | First period | No scoring |
| (Taverner, Priskie) K.J. Tiefenwerth - 07:14 (Schutt) Chase Priskie - 12:32 | | Second period | 00:57 - Mitch Vanderlaan (Kubiak); 08:12 - Jeff Kubiak (Vanderlaan, Angello); 11:34 - PP - Matt Buckles (unassisted); 14:23 - Christian Hilbrich (unassisted) |
| (Tschantz, Hilbrich) Trevor Yates - GW - 05:44 | | Third period | No scoring |
| ( 20 saves / 25 shots ) Michael Garteig | | Goalie stats | Mitch Gillam ( 24 saves / 28 shots ) |

| March 13 | Quinnipiac | 6 – 3 | Cornell | TD Bank Sports Center | Recap |
| (T. Clifton) Scott Davidson - 01:10 (C. Clifton, Martin) Bo Pieper - 08:05 | | First period | 04:12 - PP - Matt Buckles (Hilbrich, Bliss) |
| (MacMaster, Tiefenwerth) Bo Pieper - 02:45 (Priskie, D. Smith) Andrew Taverner - GW PP - 16:14 (Toews, T. Clifton) Sam Anas - PP - 19:33 | | Second period | No scoring |
| (C. Clifton) Travis St. Denis - 14:52 | | Third period | 05:56 - Eric Freschi (McCarron, Weidner); 18:48 - Jake Weidner (Hilbrich, Tiitinen) |
| ( 30 saves / 33 shots ) Michael Garteig / ( 0 saves / 0 shots ) Jacob Meyers | | Goalie stats | Mitch Gillam ( 29 saves / 34 shots ) / Ryan Coon ( 0 saves / 0 shots ) |

| Quinnipiac won series 2–1 |

==== (2) Yale vs. (7) Dartmouth ====
| March 11 | Yale | 3 – 4 | OT | Dartmouth | Ingalls Rink | Recap |
| No Scoring | | First period | | No scoring |
| No scoring | | Second period | | 11:19 - River Rymsha (Kalk) |
| (Learned) Frankie DiChiara - 00:28 (Hart, Hitchcock) Rob O'Gara - 09:21 (Snively, Wilson) John Hayden - 17:24 | | Third period | | 03:37 - Nick Bligh (Schierhorn, Crema); 12:24 - Nick Bligh (Crema, Hartley) |
| No scoring | | First overtime period | | 17:14 - Connor Yau (O'Brien, Jasiek) |
| ( 36 saves / 40 shots ) Alex Lyon | | Goalie stats | | Charles Grant ( 48 saves / 51 shots ) |

| March 12 | Yale | 1 – 2 | Dartmouth | Ingalls Rink | Recap |
| (Cooper, Learned) Frankie DiChiara - 07:11 | | First period | 13:12 - Tim Shoup (Schierhorn, Crema); 18:00 - GW - Kevan Kilistoff (Neiley) |
| No scoring | | Second period | No scoring |
| No scoring | | Third period | No scoring |
| ( 13 saves / 15 shots ) Alex Lyon | | Goalie stats | Charles Grant ( 46 saves / 47 shots ) |

| Dartmouth won series 2–0 |

==== (3) Harvard vs. (6) Rensselaer ====
| March 11 | Harvard | 5 – 2 | Rensselaer | Bright-Landry Hockey Center | Recap |
| (Esposito, Bergin) Sean Malone - 17:02 | | First period | No scoring |
| (Donato, Baughman) Seb Lloyd - 02:56 (Malone, Esposito) Colin Blackwell - GW - 08:08 (Donato, Kerfoot) Seb Lloyd - 15:38 | | Second period | 18:06 - Miloš Bubela (unassisted) |
| (Esposito, Blackwell) Sean Malone - 09:32 | | Third period | 04:49 - Phil Hampton (Miller, Rodriguez) |
| ( 25 saves / 27 shots ) Merrick Madsen | | Goalie stats | Jason Kasdorf ( 27 saves / 31 shots ) / Cam Hackett ( 11 saves / 12 shots ) |

| March 12 | Harvard | 8 – 2 | Rensselaer | Bright-Landry Hockey Center | Recap |
| (Esposito, Malone) Jake Horton - 15:02 (Vesey, Criscuolo) Viktor Dombrovskiy - 17:43 | | First period | 16:21 - Riley Bourbonnais (Nanne); 16:44 - Jesper Öhrvall (Nanne, Bradley) |
| (Jaw, Bergin) Sean Malone - GW - 01:35 (Blackwell, Malone) Clay Anderson - 09:26 | | Second period | No scoring |
| (unassisted) Jimmy Vesey - 00:15 (unassisted) Jimmy Vesey - 13:04 (Floodstrand, Tringale) Brayden Jaw - PP - 16:03 (Floodstrand, Horton) Ryan Donato - 17:17 | | Third period | No scoring |
| ( 37 saves / 39 shots ) Merrick Madsen | | Goalie stats | Cam Hackett ( 30 saves / 38 shots ) / Sam Goodman ( 0 saves / 0 shots ) |

| Harvard won series 2–0 |

==== (4) St. Lawrence vs. (5) Clarkson ====
| March 11 | St. Lawrence | 3 – 2 | OT | Clarkson | Appleton Arena | Recap |
| (Gluchowski, Hudson) Alexander Dahl - 04:57 | | First period | | 14:14 - Perry D'Arrisso (Megannety, de Haas) |
| No scoring | | Second period | | 10:41 - Nic Pierog (Summers) |
| (Lough, Smolcynski) Jacob Pritchard - 06:59 | | Third period | | No scoring |
| (Smolcynski) Brian Ward - GW - 08:12 | | First overtime period | | No scoring |
| ( 40 saves / 42 shots ) Kyle Hayton | | Goalie stats | | Greg Lewis ( 33 saves / 33 shots ) |

| March 12 | St. Lawrence | 3 – 2 | 2OT | Clarkson | Appleton Arena | Recap |
| (Thompson, Sweetman) Nolan Gluchowski - 00:56 | | First period | | No scoring |
| (Ward, Smolcynski) Jacob Pritchard - 06:47 | | Second period | | 16:12 - Jeff Di Nallo (Josephs, Bessette) |
| No scoring | | Third period | | 04:47 - Kevin Tansey (Bessette, Di Nallo) |
| (Ward, Smolcynski) Gavin Bayreuther - GW - 03:14 | | Second overtime period | | No scoring |
| ( 50 saves / 52 shots ) Kyle Hayton | | Goalie stats | | Greg Lewis ( 40 saves / 43 shots ) |

| St. Lawrence won series 2–0 |

=== Semifinals ===
==== (1) Quinnipiac vs. (7) Dartmouth ====
| March 18 | Quinnipiac | 3 – 1 | Dartmouth | Herb Brooks Arena | Recap |
| (Anas) Connor Clifton - 16:53 | | First period | No scoring |
| (T. Clifton, St. Denis) Sam Anas - GW PP - 00:54 (MacMaster, C. Clifton) Craig Martin - 05:12 | | Second period | No scoring |
| No scoring | | Third period | 14:57 - Connor Yau (Jasiek, Neiley) |
| ( 23 saves / 24 shots ) Michael Garteig | | Goalie stats | Charles Grant ( 26 saves / 29 shots ) |

==== (3) Harvard vs. (4) St. Lawrence ====
| March 18 | Harvard | 2 – 1 | OT | St. Lawrence | Herb Brooks Arena | Recap |
| No Scoring | | First period | | No scoring |
| (Blackwell, Kerfoot) Jimmy Vesey - 00:59 | | Second period | | No scoring |
| No scoring | | Third period | | 14:36 - Gavin Bayreuther (Pritchard, Ward) |
| (Vesey, Bergin) Kyle Criscuolo - GW - 02:18 | | First overtime period | | No scoring |
| ( 35 saves / 36 shots ) Merrick Madsen | | Goalie stats | | Kyle Hayton ( 29 saves / 31 shots ) |

=== Championship ===
==== (1) Quinnipiac vs. (3) Harvard ====
| March 19 | Quinnipiac | 4 – 1 | Harvard | Herb Brooks Arena | Recap |
| No Scoring | | First period | No scoring |
| (L. Smith) Tim Clifton - PP - 01:11 (L. Smith, C. Clifton) Bo Pieper - GW PP - 03:02 (Taverner, D. Smith) K.J. Tiefenwerth - PP - 07:20 | | Second period | 07:28 - Ryan Donato (unassisted) |
| (St. Denis, C. Clifton) Scott Davidson - EN - 18:51 | | Third period | No scoring |
| ( 24 saves / 25 shots ) Michael Garteig | | Goalie stats | Merrick Madsen ( 24 saves / 27 shots ) |

== Tournament awards ==
=== All-Tournament Team ===
- F Travis St. Denis (Quinnipiac)
- F Landon Smith (Quinnipiac)
- F Jimmy Vesey (Harvard)
- D Connor Clifton* (Quinnipiac)
- D Gavin Bayreuther (St. Lawrence)
- G Michael Garteig (Quinnipiac)

* Most Outstanding Player(s)

== Media ==
=== Television ===
ASN had the television rights to semifinals and championship game during the tournament.

==== Broadcast Assignments ====
Semifinals & Championship

- Eric Frede & Colby Cohen

=== Streaming ===
Every game during the tournament was streamed through the ECAC Hockey's website.
