= 2015–16 CCHL season =

- League: Central Canada Hockey League
- Sport: Hockey
- Duration: Regular season 2015-09-04 / 2016-03-08
- Teams: 12
- TV partner: FASTHockey
- Finals champions: TBD

CCHL seasons
- 2014–15 2016–17

The 2015–16 CCHL season was the 55th season of the Central Canada Hockey League (CCHL). The twelve teams of the CCHL played 62-game schedules.

The winner of the Bogart Cup competed in the Eastern Canadian Junior "A" championship, the Fred Page Cup. If successful against the winners of the Quebec Junior Hockey League and Maritime Junior A Hockey League, the champion would then move on to play in the Canadian Junior Hockey League championship, the Royal Bank Cup.

== Final standings ==
Note: W = Wins; L = Losses; OTL = Overtime losses; SL = Shootout losses; GF = Goals for; GA = Goals against; PTS = Points; x = clinched playoff berth; y = clinched division title; z = clinched league title.

Robinson division
Team	Centre	W	L	OTL	SOL	GF	GA	Points
Carleton Place Canadians	Carleton Place, Ontario	43	16	2	1	247	178	89
Hawkesbury Hawks	Hawkesbury, Ontario	40	16	1	5	224	170	86
Brockville Braves	Brockville, Ontario	40	19	1	2	197	161	83
Smiths Falls Bears	Smiths Falls, Ontario	38	22	0	2	220	170	78
Kemptville 73's	Kemptville, Ontario	36	23	2	1	224	179	75
Cornwall Colts	Cornwall, Ontario	30	27	4	1	208	193	68
Yzerman division
Team	Centre	W	L	OTL	SOL	GF	GA	Points
Ottawa Jr. Senators	Ottawa, Ontario	40	14	4	4	215	153	88
Cumberland Grads	Cumberland, Ontario	36	19	5	2	258	185	79
Pembroke Lumber Kings	Pembroke, Ontario	34	23	4	1	197	163	73
Nepean Raiders	Nepean, Ontario	34	23	4	1	156	198	52
Kanata Lasers	Kanata, Ontario	7	54	1	0	115	322	15
Gloucester Rangers	Gloucester, Ontario	5	52	3	2	116	305	15

Teams listed on the official league website.

Standings listed on official league website.

== Season leaders ==
=== Scoring ===
Note: GP = Games played; G = Goals; A = Assists; Pts = Points; PIM = Penalty minutes

Player / Team / GP / G / A / Pts / PIM; Shawn Cameron / Cumberland / 61 / 40 / 51 / 91 / 43

More on scoring leaders

=== Goal keeping ===
Note: GP = Games played; Mins = Minutes played; W = Wins; L = Losses: OTL = Overtime losses; SL = Shootout losses; GA = Goals Allowed; SO = Shutouts; GAA = Goals against average

Player / Team / GP / Mins / W / L / OTL / SOL / SO / GA / GAA / Svs / Sv%; Colton Point / Carleton Place Canadians / 33 / 1890:58 / 23 / 6 / 1 / 1 / 7 / 68 / 2.16 / 730 / .915

More on goaltending leaders

=== Special teams ===
==== Power play ====
Note: GP = Games played; PPGF = Power play goals for; ADV = Man Advantage Opportunities; PP% = Power play percentage; SHGA = Short Handed Goals Against

Team / GP / PPGF / ADV / PP% / SHGA; Carleton Place / 62 / 62 / 273 / 23.71 / 8

==== Penalty killing ====
Note: GP = Games played; PPGA = Power play goals against; TSH = Times Short Handed; PK% = Power killing percentage; SHGF = Short Handed Goals For

Team / GP / PPGA / TSH / PK% / SHGF; Hawkesbury / 62 / 26 / 235 / 88.94 / 8

More on CCHL Special Teams

== Season streaks ==
- Wins = Carleton Place & Cumberland with 10
- Losses = Kanata with 22
- Home Wins = Carleton Place with 17
- Home losses = Kanata with 12
- Road Wins = Brockville with 6
- Road losses = Kanata with 17
- More on CCHL streaks

== 2016 Bogart Cup playoffs ==
Quarter-finals
1	Carleton Place	4
8	Pembroke	1
4	Brockville	4
5	Cumberland	0
2	Ottawa	4
7	Kemptville	1
3	Hawkesbury	4
6	Smiths Falls	0

Semi-finals
1	Carleton Place	4
4	Brockville	0
2	Ottawa	4
3	Hawkesbury	2

Bogart Cup Finals
1	Carleton Place	4
2	Ottawa	3

Playoff results are listed on the official league website.

== Fred Page Cup Championship ==
The 2016 edition of the Fred Page Cup was hosted by the Woodstock Slammers in Woodstock, New Brunswick.

== Royal Bank Cup Championship ==
The Lloydminster Bobcats in Lloydminster, Alberta / Saskatchewan met the winners of the Fred page Cup, the Dudley Hewitt Cup and the Western Canada Cup in the Royal Bank Cup.

== Players selected in the 2016 NHL entry draft ==
Decided at conclusion of season.

== Awards ==
- Most Valuable Player -
- Top Rookie -
- Top Graduating Player -
- Top Defenceman -
- Top Prospect -
- Top Goaltender -
- Top Coach -
- Top General Manager -

== See also ==
- 2014 Royal Bank Cup
- 2013 in ice hockey
- 2014 in ice hockey

Preceded by 2013–14 CCHL season	CCHL seasons	Succeeded by 2015–16 CCHL season
