= Ryan Kuffner =

Canadian ice hockey player

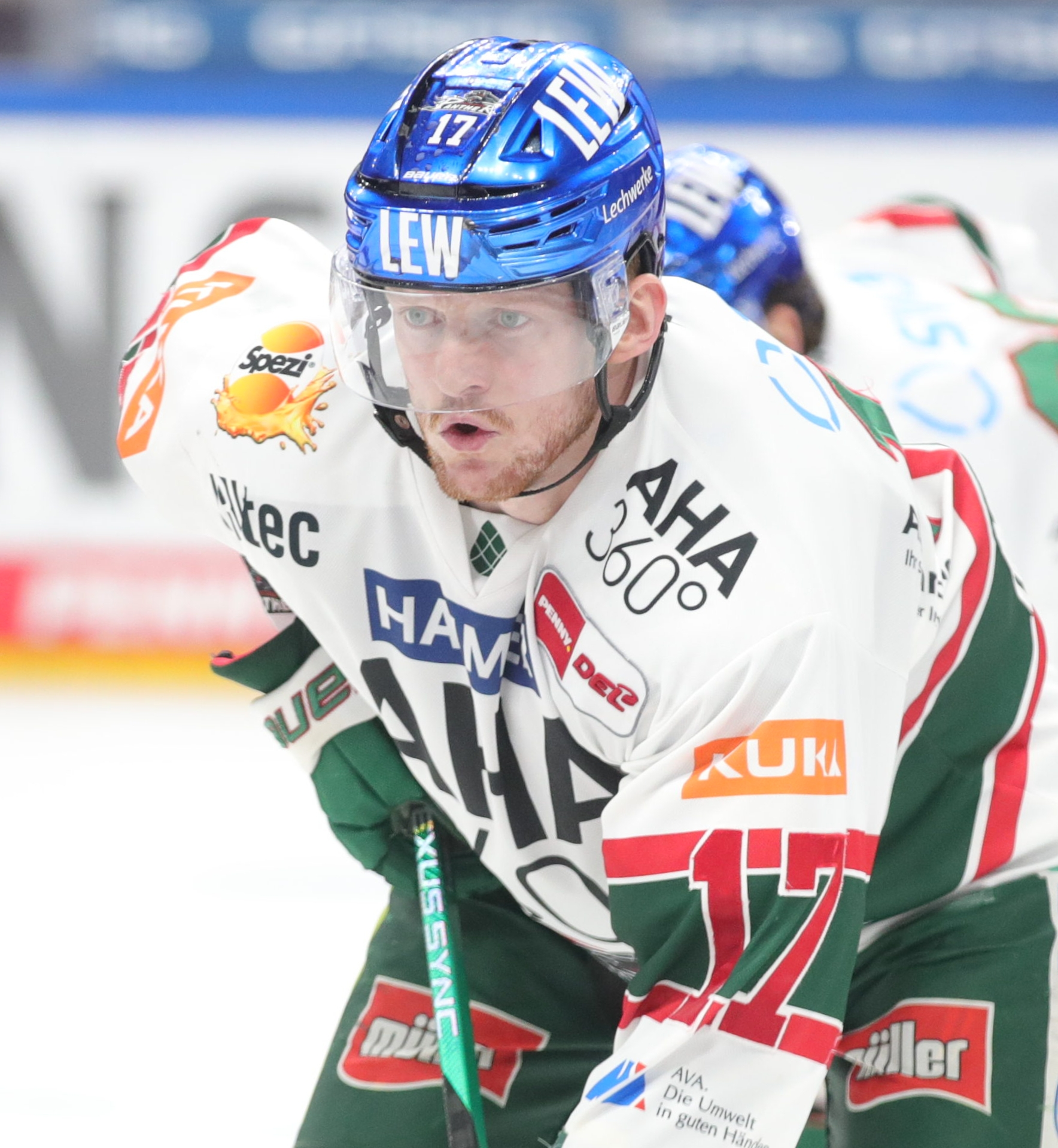
- Kuffner in 2023
- Born: June 12, 1996 (age 30) Ottawa, Ontario, Canada
- Height: 6 ft 1 in (185 cm)
- Weight: 195 lb (88 kg; 13 st 13 lb)
- Position: Forward
- Shoots: Left
- team Former teams: Free agent Detroit Red Wings; ERC Ingolstadt; Augsburger Panther
- NHL draft: Undrafted
- Playing career: 2019–present

Ryan Patrick Kuffner (born June 12, 1996) is a Canadian professional ice hockey player who is currently an unrestricted free agent. He most recently played for Augsburger Panther of the Deutsche Eishockey Liga (DEL). Kuffner is Princeton's all-time leading goal scorer with 75 goals.

== Playing career ==
=== Junior ===
Ryan Kuffner played parts of three season for the Gloucester Rangers of the Central Canada Hockey League (CCHL) from 2013 to 2015, where he recorded 115 points in 101 games. Kuffner was named the CCHL Second Star of the Month for the month of October 2014, where he recorded 11 goals and 12 assists in 11 games. During the 2014–15 season, Kuffner recorded 33 goals and 37 assists in 49 games, and helped lead the Rangers to their first CCHL playoff appearance.

=== College ===
Kuffner began his collegiate career for the Princeton Tigers during the 2015–16 season. He recorded five goals and 15 assists in 31 games, leading the team in scoring with 20 points. Following his outstanding freshman season, he was named to the ECAC Hockey All-Rookie Team. During the 2016–17 season, he recorded 19 goals and 17 assists in 34 games, leading the team in scoring with 36 points.

During the 2017–18 season, he recorded 29 goals and 23 assists in 36 games, ranking second on the team in scoring with 52 points. He ranked second in the nation in goals per game (0.81) and fifth in the nation in points per game. He had a 13-game point scoring streak of 18 goals, 13 assists and 31 points. He recorded his first career hat-trick on February 2, 2018 against St. Lawrence. He was subsequently named the ECAC Player of the Week and NCAA 1st Star of the Week. He led the nation in scoring during the week, scoring six goals and three assists in three games. Kuffner was named the ECAC Hockey Player of the Month for the month of February 2018. He recorded 10 goals and six assists in eights games, including two hat-tricks. During the 2018 ECAC Hockey Men's Ice Hockey Tournament, he recorded four goals and seven assists to help Princeton win the tournament championship, and receive an automatic bid to the 2018 NCAA Division I Men's Ice Hockey Tournament. Following an outstanding season, he was named to the All-ECAC Hockey Second Team and named an AHCA Second Team All-American.

During the 2018–19 season, he recorded 22 goals and 22 assists in 31 games. His 22 goals led the ECAC, and ranked fourth in the NCAA, while his 1.42 points-per-game led the mation. On February 2, 2019, Kuffner recorded his 68th career goal, becoming Princeton's all-time leading goal scorer, surpassing the previous record of 67 goals set by John Cook in 1963. Kuffner was named the ECAC Hockey Player of the Month for the month of March 2019. He led the league in scoring with six goals and seven assists in eights games. Following an outstanding season, he was named to the All-ECAC Hockey First Team and AHCA First Team All-American. He became the first player in Princeton program history to earn two All-America honors since the award was created in 1947–48. He finished his career at Princeton with 75 goals, and 77 assists in 132 games, ranking second-all time in points (152) and first in goals (75).

=== Professional ===
On March 12, 2019, Kuffner signed a two-year, entry-level contract with the Detroit Red Wings. He made his NHL debut on March 16, in a game against the New York Islanders, playing on the third line along with Frans Nielsen and Thomas Vanek.

During the 2019–20 season, Kuffner was assigned to Red Wings' AHL affiliate, the Grand Rapids Griffins. He recorded six goals and three assists in 32 games during his first full professional season. On February 24, 2020, Kuffner was traded by the Red Wings at the NHL trade deadline, along with Andreas Athanasiou, to the Edmonton Oilers in exchange for Sam Gagner and second-round draft picks in 2020 and 2021. He reported to AHL affiliate, the Bakersfield Condors, appearing in four regular season games before the remainder of the season was cancelled due to the COVID-19 pandemic.

As an impending restricted free agent, Kuffner was not tendered a qualifying offer by the Oilers and was released to explore free agency on October 7, 2020. Unable to secure an NHL contract, on December 28, 2020, Kuffner was signed to a one-year contract by ERC Ingolstadt of the Deutsche Eishockey Liga (DEL), for the 2020–21 season. In his lone season in Germany, Kuffner recorded seven goals and 14 points in 31 regular season games. He left the club following the post-season in which he recorded two goals and five points in five games.

On August 10, 2021, Kuffner signed a one-year, two-way contract with the Iowa Wild of the AHL, the primary affiliate to the Minnesota Wild. On October 11, 2021, he was assigned to the Iowa Heartlanders of the ECHL. On October 28, 2021, he was recalled by the Iowa Wild. Prior to being recalled, he recorded one goal and two assists in two games for the Heartlanders.

On June 24, 2022, Kuffner having concluded his contract with the Iowa Wild, returned to the German DEL, signing a one-year contract with Augsburger Panther.

== Personal life ==
Kuffner is the great, great nephew of former NHL player Edwin Gorman.

== Career statistics ==
			Regular season					Playoffs
Season	Team	League	GP	G	A	Pts	PIM	GP	G	A	Pts	PIM
2012–13	Gloucester Rangers	CCHL	3	0	0	0	0	—	—	—	—	—
2013–14	Gloucester Rangers	CCHL	49	22	23	45	8	—	—	—	—	—
2014–15	Gloucester Rangers	CCHL	49	33	37	70	16	—	—	—	—	—
2015–16	Princeton University	ECAC	31	5	15	20	4	—	—	—	—	—
2016–17	Princeton University	ECAC	34	19	17	36	2	—	—	—	—	—
2017–18	Princeton University	ECAC	36	29	23	52	6	—	—	—	—	—
2018–19	Princeton University	ECAC	31	22	22	44	8	—	—	—	—	—
2018–19	Detroit Red Wings	NHL	10	0	0	0	0	—	—	—	—	—
2019–20	Grand Rapids Griffins	AHL	32	6	3	9	2	—	—	—	—	—
2019–20	Bakersfield Condors	AHL	4	0	2	2	0	—	—	—	—	—
2020–21	ERC Ingolstadt	DEL	31	7	7	14	10	5	2	3	5	0
2021–22	Iowa Heartlanders	ECHL	41	18	46	64	30	—	—	—	—	—
2021–22	Iowa Wild	AHL	5	0	0	0	0	—	—	—	—	—
2022–23	Augsburger Panther	DEL	54	15	17	32	18	—	—	—	—	—
NHL totals			10	0	0	0	0	—	—	—	—	—

== Awards and honours ==
Honors	Year
College
All-ECAC Hockey Rookie Team	2016
All-ECAC Hockey Second Team	2018
AHCA East Second-Team All-American	2018
All-ECAC Hockey First Team	2019
AHCA East First-Team All-American	2019
