= 2025–26 CCHL season =

65th season of the CCHL

- League: CCHL
- Sport: Junior ice hockey
- Duration: Pre-season; 26 August – 14 September; Regular season 17 September – 15 March; Post-season; 20 March – 22 April
- Games: 330
- Teams: 12
- Total attendance: 79,065
- Streaming partner: FloSports

League championship
- Champions: Rockland Nationals
- Runners-up: Smiths Falls Bears

CCHL seasons
- ← 2024–25 2026–27 →

The 2025–26 CCHL season is the 65th season of the Central Canada Hockey League (CCHL). The regular season runs from 17 September 2025 until 15 March 2026 with each of the 12 clubs playing a 55-game schedule.

The league appointed Jesse Winchester as commissioner. Winchester played three seasons with the Cornwall Colts (2001–2004) and was named CCHL Coach of the Year two years in row (2017–18 and 2018–19) while coaching the Brockville Braves.

The Rockland Nationals finished the regular season as the highest ranked club, both in the CCHL and across the Canadian Junior Hockey League (CJHL), with a win-loss record of 52-3. The Nationals would go on to win their second straight CCHL title and represent the league at the 2026 Centennial Cup.

== Regular season ==
The regular season ran from 17 September 2025 to 16 March 2026. Each team played 55 games, playing against each opponent five times. While teams were nominally assigned to either the East or West Division, the top 8 teams overall advanced to the playoffs regardless of their division assignment.

Standings
Rank	Team	GP	W	L	OTL	SOL	Pts
1	Rockland Nationals	55	52	3	0	0	104
2	Smiths Falls Bears	55	39	11	2	3	83
3	Ottawa Jr. Senators	55	36	15	2	2	76
4	Kemptville 73's	55	36	16	2	1	75
5	Navan Grads	55	26	23	5	1	58
6	Renfrew Wolves	55	26	24	3	2	57
7	Brockville Braves	55	22	24	2	7	53
8	Carleton Place Canadians	55	24	28	1	2	51
9	Cornwall Colts	55	23	29	2	1	49
10	Hawkesbury Hawks	55	19	30	4	2	44
11	Nepean Raiders	55	17	33	2	3	39
12	Pembroke Lumber Kings	55	10	42	2	1	23

Source: "2025–26 CCHL regular season standings". hockeydb.com.

== Post-season ==
2026 League championship
Bogart Cup

Tournament details
- Dates: 20 March – 22 April
- Teams: 8
- Defending champions: Rockland Nationals

Final positions
- Champions: Rockland Nationals (2nd title)
- Runners-up: Smiths Falls Bears
- Semifinalists: Kemptville 73's; Ottawa Jr. Senators

Tournament statistics
- Games played: 13
- Goals scored: 88 (6.77 per game)
- Attendance: 11,911 (916 per game)

Awards
- Playoff MVP: Gabriel Le Houillier

Official website
- 2026 CCHL playoffs

The best eight teams advanced to the playoffs. In the final round, the first-place Rockland Nationals swept the second-place Smiths Falls Bears.

Quarterfinals
Rockland	4
Carleton Place	1
Kemptville	4
Navan	1
Smiths Falls	4
Brockville	0
Ottawa	4
Renfrew	1

Semifinals
Rockland	4
Kemptville	0
Smiths Falls	4
Ottawa	1

Finals
Rockland	4
Smiths Falls	0

Source: "CCHL playoffs 2026". thecchl.ca. Central Canada Hockey League.

=== Quarterfinal: Rockland Nationals v. Carleton Place Canadians ===
The first-place Rockland Nationals defeated the eighth-place Carleton Place Canadians in four games to one.

20 March	Carleton Place Canadians	4:8	Rockland Nationals	Rockland Arena	Recap
power play 17:34 (1)		First period	(1) 05:58
10:02 (2); 11:17 (3); 19:04 (4)		Second period	(2) 04:39 (3) 05:09 (4) 05:25 (5) 17:49
		Third period	(6) 01:29 (7) 01:51 (8) 09:30 power play

22 March	Rockland Nationals	8:1	Carleton Place Canadians	Carleton Place Arena	Recap
07:22 (1); 08:31 (2); 09:19 (3) power play 10:48 (4); 13:21 (5)		First period
02:23 (6)		Second period	(1) 11:48 power play
10:54 (7); 16:16 (8)		Third period

24 March	Carleton Place Canadians	2:4	Rockland Nationals	Rockland Arena	Recap
		First period	(1) 02:44 (2) 03:28 (3) 05:42
18:45 (1)		Second period
power play 00:58 (2)		Third period	(4) 17:21

25 March	Rockland Nationals	1:4	Carleton Place Canadians	Carleton Place Arena	Recap
power play 07:16 (1)		First period	(1) 03:30
		Second period	(2) 17:35 power play
		Third period	(3) 17:11 empty net (4) 18:21 empty net

27 March	Carleton Place Canadians	3:5	Rockland Nationals	Rockland Arena	Recap
16:17 (1)		First period	(1) 04:18
04:34 (2)		Second period	(2) 05:10 (3) 12:16
16:58 (3)		Third period	(4) 18:09 (5) 19:25 empty net

Rockland Nationals win series 4:1

=== Quarterfinal: Smiths Falls v. Brockville Braves ===
The second-place Smiths Falls Bears swept the seventh-place Brockville Braves in four consecutive games.

20 March	Brockville Braves	2:3	OT	Smiths Falls Bears	Smiths Falls Memorial Arena	Recap
short handed 15:26 (1)		First period		(1) 03:24 power play
		Second period
power play 10:17 (2)		Third period		(2) 14:34
		First overtime period		(3) 18:53

22 March	Smiths Falls Bears	3:1	Brockville Braves	Brockville Centennial Youth Arena	Recap
08:39 (1); 11:57 (2)		First period	(1) 01:47
		Second period
08:55 (3)		Third period

24 March	Brockville Braves	2:6	Smiths Falls Bears	Smiths Falls Memorial Arena	Recap
11:06 (1)		First period	(1) 17:32
18:18 (2)		Second period	(2) 02:52 (3) 08:33 (4) 13:58 (5) 14:47
		Third period	(6) 04:51

26 March	Smiths Falls Bears	12:1	Brockville Braves	Brockville Centennial Youth Arena	Recap
07:00 (1); 10:16 (2); 15:05 (3); 15:42 (4) power play 18:13 (5)		First period
power play 10:13 (6); 11:16 (7) power play 17:19 (8)		Second period
07:05 (9); 07:26 (10); 07:55 (11); 17:23 (12)		Third period	(1) 08:04

Smiths Falls Bears win series 4:0

=== Quarterfinal: Ottawa Jr. Senators v. Renfrew Wolves ===
The third-place Ottawa Jr. Senators defeated the sixth-place Renfrew Wolves in four games to one.

21 March	Renfrew Wolves	1:0	2OT	Ottawa Jr. Senators	Jim Durrell Sports Complex	Recap
		First period
		Second period
		Third period
02:28 (1)		Second overtime period

23 March	Ottawa Jr. Senators	6:2	Renfrew Wolves	MyFM Centre Recreation Complex	Recap
07:30 (1); 08:08 (2); 08:48 (3) power play 14:07 (4); 16:51 (5)		First period	(1) 04:50 power play
power play 14:20 (6)		Second period	(2) 05:39 power play
		Third period

25 March	Renfrew Wolves	2:3	Ottawa Jr. Senators	Jim Durrell Sports Complex	Recap
		First period
18:59 (1)		Second period	(1) 01:35 power play (2) 18:36
06:43 (2)		Third period	(3) 10:34 power play

27 March	Ottawa Jr. Senators	3:1	Renfrew Wolves	MyFM Centre Recreation Complex	Recap
16:00 (1)		First period	(1) 05:50 power play
power play 03:41 (2); 17:43 (3)		Second period
		Third period

28 March	Renfrew Wolves	2:6	Ottawa Jr. Senators	Jim Durrell Sports Complex	Recap
		First period	(1) 00:20 (2) 13:11 (3) 17:32
12:04 (1)		Second period	(4) 19:09
18:04 (2)		Third period	(5) 06:41 (6) 07:21

Ottawa Jr. Senators win series 4:1

=== Quarterfinal: Kemptville 73's v. Navan Grads ===
The fourth-place Kemptville 73's defeated the fifth-place Navan Grads in four games to one.

19 March	Navan Grads	3:4	OT	Kemptville 73's	North Grenville Municipal Centre	Recap
		First period		(1) 03:57
11:07 (1); 12:46 (2)		Second period
07:22 (3)		Third period		(2) 14:16 power play (3) 19:18
		First overtime period		(4) 00:16

21 March	Navan Grads	3:6	Kemptville 73's	North Grenville Municipal Centre	Recap
05:54 (1)		First period	(1) 07:52 power play
08:15 (2) power play 19:15 (3)		Second period	(2) 08:02 (3) 18:43
		Third period	(4) 03:40 power play (5) 06:14 (6) 18:48 empty net

22 March	Kemptville 73's	0:3	Navan Grads	Navan Memorial Centre	Recap
		First period
		Second period	(1) 09:12 (2) 19:01
		Third period	(3) 18:56 empty net

24 March	Kemptville 73's	4:3	2OT	Navan Grads	Navan Memorial Centre	Recap
power play 02:57 (1) power play 19:18 (2)		First period		(1) 01:11 (2) 12:18 power play (3) 13:04
		Second period
07:34 (3)		Third period
06:17 (4)		Second overtime period

27 March	Navan Grads	2:3	2OT	Kemptville 73's	North Grenville Municipal Centre	Recap
		First period		(1) 17:27 power play
power play 19:01 (1)		Second period		(2) 11:30
02:37 (2)		Third period
		Second overtime period		(3) 19:14

Kemptville 73's win series 4:1

=== Seminfinal: Rockland Nationals v. Kemptville 73's ===
The Rockland Nationals swept the Kemptville 73's and advanced to the final round.

2 April	Kemptville 73's	2:4	Rockland Nationals	Rockland Arena	Recap
		First period
08:21 (1)		Second period	(1) 00:32 (2) 11:24 power play (3) 16:34
power play 15:22 (2)		Third period	(4) 19:34 empty net

4 April	Rockland Nationals	5:1	Kemptville 73's	North Grenville Municipal Centre	Recap
01:06 (1) power play 08:04 (2); 08:45 (3)		First period	(1) 18:07 power play
power play 17:57 (4)		Second period
16:42 (5)		Third period

6 April	Kemptville 73's	1:5	Rockland Nationals	Rockland Arena	Recap
power play 01:55 (1)		First period
		Second period	(1) 02:40 (2) 05:37 (3) 10:47 power play
		Third period	(4) 10:35 (5) 12:10

8 April	Rockland Nationals	3:1	Kemptville 73's	North Grenville Municipal Centre	Recap
		First period	(1) 09:56
		Second period
power play 07:22 (1); 08:43 (2) empty net 19:41 (3)		Third period

Rockland Nationals win series 4:0

=== Seminfinal: Smiths Falls Bears v. Ottawa Jr. Senators ===
The Smiths Falls Bears defeated the Ottawa Jr. Senators four games to one and advanced to the final.

3 April	Ottawa Jr. Senators	3:4	OT	Smiths Falls Bears	Smiths Falls Memorial Centre	Recap
		First period		(1) 03:42 power play
06:40 (1)		Second period
19:27 (2); 19:59 (3)		Third period		(2) 05:31 (3) 11:16
		First overtime period		(4) 09:36

5 April	Smiths Falls Bears	7:2	Ottawa Jr. Senators	Jim Durrell Sports Complex	Recap
00:12 (1) power play 06:36 (2); 08:04 (3)		First period
06:34 (4); 08:50 (5) power play 19:23 (6)		Second period
01:24 (7)		Third period	(1) 11:53 (2) 14:26

7 April	Ottawa Jr. Senators	1:2	Smiths Falls Bears	Smiths Falls Memorial Centre	Recap
		First period	(1) 02:58 (2) 19:41
		Second period
11:32 (1)		Third period

8 April	Smiths Falls Bears	1:2	OT	Ottawa Jr. Senators	Jim Durrell Sports Complex	Recap
		First period
		Second period
19:22 (1)		Third period		(1) 14:01
		First overtime period		(2) 15:36 penalty shot

10 April	Ottawa Jr. Senators	3:4	2OT	Smiths Falls Bears	Smiths Falls Memorial Centre	Recap
04:45 (1)		First period		(1) 13:40
19:08 (2)		Second period		(2) 18:29
07:18 (3)		Third period		(3) 17:12
		Second overtime period		(4) 18:28

Smiths Falls Bears win series 4:1

=== Final: Rockland Nationals v. Smiths Falls Bears ===
The Rockland Nationals swept the Smiths Falls Bears in four games to win their second consecutive league championship and advance to the 2026 Centennial Cup national championship tournament in Summerside, Prince Edward Island.

17 April	Smiths Falls Bears	1:3	Rockland Nationals	Rockland Arena	Recap
		First period	(1) 01:17
		Second period	(2) 08:42
06:55 (1)		Third period	(3) 19:32 empty net

18 April	Rockland Nationals	4:3	OT	Smiths Falls Bears	Smiths Falls Memorial Centre	Recap
06:59 (1); 10:16 (2) power play 12:25 (3)		First period		(1) 04:00
		Second period		(2) 01:06 power play (3) 19:26
		Third period
03:34 (4)		First overtime period

20 April	Smiths Falls Bears	3:4	Rockland Nationals	Rockland Arena	Recap
06:29 (1)		First period	(1) 02:51 (2) 06:15
19:03 (2)		Second period	(3) 08:23
power play 05:55 (3)		Third period	(4) 12:17

22 April	Rockland Nationals	6:2	Smiths Falls Bears	Smiths Falls Memorial Centre	Recap
05:26 (1); 12:56 (2)		First period	(1) 00:20 (2) 05:07 power play
06:34 (3); 18:06 (4)		Second period
06:15 (5) power play 08:00 (6)		Third period

Rockland Nationals win series 4:0

== Sources ==
- "2025–26 schedule released". thecchl.ca (Press release). Central Canada Hockey League. 9 July 2025.
- "OHL discussing development partnership with CCHL". Lanarkleedstoday.ca. 88.1 myFM News. 11 September 2025.
- "The Drive - Jesse Winchester: The Rockland Nationals are a force". TSN. Bell Media. 7 April 2026.
