= 2016–17 CCHL season =

56th season of the CCHL

- League: Central Canada Hockey League
- Sport: Ice hockey
- Duration: Regular season September–March
- Teams: 12

League championship
- Bogart Cup: Carleton Place Canadians
- Runners-up: Ottawa Jr. Senators

CCHL seasons
- ← 2015–16 2017–18 →

The 2016–17 CCHL season was the 56th season of the Central Canada Hockey League (CCHL). The twelve teams of the CCHL play a 62-game schedule.

== Season highlights ==
The Carleton Place Canadians won the league championship Bogart Cup for the 4th year in a row. They went on to compete for the 2017 Fred Page Cup and lost in the final match to the Quebec Junior Hockey League (QJHL) championship Terrebonne Cobras.

Cameron Crotty of the Brockville Braves was drafted 82nd overall in the third round of the 2017 NHL entry draft by the Arizona Coyotes.

=== Awards ===
- Most Valuable Player: Grant Hebert (Cumberland Grads)
- Top Rookie: Merrick Rippon (Ottawa Jr. Senators)
- Outstanding Defenceman: Owen Grant (Carleton Place Canadians)
- Sportsmanship/ability award: Charles Levesque (Hawkesbury Hawks)
- Top Prospect: Cameron Crotty (Brockville Braves)
- Outstanding graduating player: Grant Cooper (Cornwall Colts)
- Arthur K. Nielsen scholarship award: Owen Grant (Carleton Place Canadians)
- Scoring champion: Grant Hebert (Cumberland Grads)
- Top Goaltender: Henry Johnson (Brockville Braves)
- Top Coach: Ian MacInnis (Cornwall Colts)
- Top General Manager: Jason Clarke (Carleton Place Canadians)

Source: "Season award archives". thecchl.ca.

== Regular season ==
Teams played 62 regular season games. The top 8 teams overall advanced to the post-season.

Robinson division
Team	Centre	GP	W	L	OTL	SOL	GF	GA	Pts
Carleton Place Canadians	Carleton Place, Ontario	62	50	12	0	0	252	135	100
Cornwall Colts	Cornwall, Ontario	62	41	14	4	3	232	171	89
Hawkesbury Hawks	Hawkesbury, Ontario	62	36	24	0	2	205	185	74
Kemptville 73's	Kemptville, Ontario	62	33	25	2	2	216	188	70
Brockville Braves	Brockville, Ontario	62	33	26	1	2	179	162	69
Smiths Falls Bears	Smiths Falls, Ontario	62	24	31	5	2	177	209	55

Source: "2016–17 Central CCHL standings". hockeydb.com.

Yzerman division
Team	Centre	GP	W	L	OTL	SOL	GF	GA	Pts
Ottawa Jr. Senators	Ottawa, Ontario	62	41	18	1	2	203	159	85
Nepean Raiders	Nepean, Ontario	62	24	33	5	0	171	222	53
Cumberland Grads	Cumberland, Ontario	62	24	34	2	2	194	216	52
Gloucester Rangers	Gloucester, Ontario	62	22	34	3	3	141	204	50
Kanata Lasers	Kanata, Ontario	62	22	34	3	3	185	249	50
Pembroke Lumber Kings	Pembroke, Ontario	62	22	38	2	0	165	220	46

Source: "2016–17 Central CCHL standings". hockeydb.com.

== Post-season ==
2017 League championship
Bogart Cup

Tournament details
- Dates: 15 March – 23 April
- Teams: 8

Final positions
- Champions: Carleton Place Canadians
- Runners-up: Ottawa Jr. Senators

Tournament statistics
- Games played: 36
- Goals scored: 213 (5.92 per game)
- Attendance: 17,267 (480 per game)

Quarter-finals
1	Carleton Place	4
8	Nepean	1
4	Hawkesbury	2
5	Kemptville	4
2	Cornwall	4
7	Smith Falls	1
3	Ottawa	4
6	Brockville	1

Semi-finals
1	Carleton Place	4
5	Kemptville	2
2	Cornwall	0
3	Ottawa	4

Bogart Cup Finals
1	Carleton Place	4
3	Ottawa	1

Source: "2016–17 CCHL playoff results". hockeydb.com.

== Eastern Canada championship ==
The league championship Carleton Place Canadians advanced to the 2017 Fred Page Cup tournament hosted by the Quebec Junior Hockey League (QJHL) championship Terrebonne Cobras in Terrebonne, Quebec. The other competitors were the QJHL runners-up, the Longueuil Collège Français; and the Maritime Junior Hockey League (MHL) championship Truro Bearcats. The Carleton Place Canadians made it to the championship round and lost to the Terrebonne Cobras.

== National championship ==
The Cobourg Cougars of the Ontario Junior Hockey League (OJHL) hosted the 2017 Royal Bank Cup national championship tournament in Coburg, Ontario. The hosting Cobourg Cougars won the tournament after an overtime win against the Brooks Bandits of the Alberta Junior Hockey League (AJHL) in the final match.

== See also ==
- 2017 Fred Page Cup
- 2017 Royal Bank Cup
- 2016 in ice hockey
- 2017 in ice hockey

== Sources ==
- "Road to the 2017 RBC Cup". hockeycanada.ca.
- "2017 RBC Cup". hockeycanada.ca.
- "2016–17 Central CCHL standings". hockeydb.com.
