= Colin Blackwell =

American ice hockey player (born 1993)

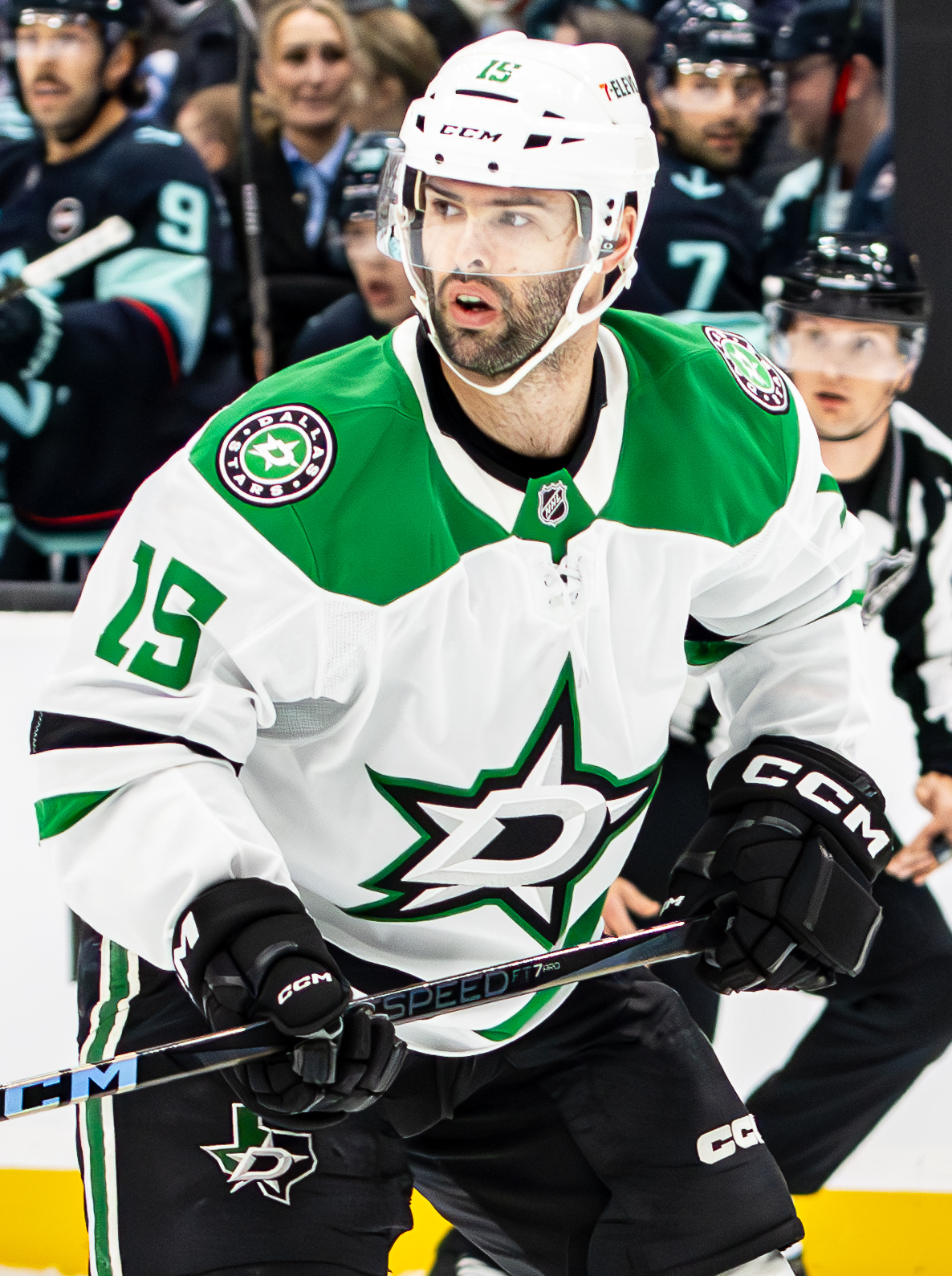
- Blackwell with the Dallas Stars in 2025
- Born: March 28, 1993 (age 33) Lawrence, Massachusetts, U.S.
- Height: 5 ft 8 in (173 cm)
- Weight: 180 lb (82 kg; 12 st 12 lb)
- Position: Center
- Shoots: Right
- NHL team Former teams: Dallas Stars; Nashville Predators; New York Rangers; Seattle Kraken; Toronto Maple Leafs; Chicago Blackhawks
- National team: United States
- NHL draft: 194th overall, 2011; San Jose Sharks
- Playing career: 2016–present

Colin Blackwell (born March 28, 1993) is an American professional ice hockey player who is a center for the Dallas Stars of the National Hockey League (NHL). He was drafted by the San Jose Sharks in the seventh round, 194th overall, in the 2011 NHL entry draft.

Growing up in Massachusetts, Blackwell played hockey locally, eventually playing junior hockey with his high school, St. John's Prep, from 2007 to 2011. After getting drafted by the Sharks that year, Blackwell began playing collegiate hockey, joining the Harvard Crimson of ECAC Hockey. In his second year with the team, two concussions left him unable to play, causing him to miss part of that season as well as another. However, Blackwell persevered and played two more seasons with Harvard, before practicing with the Sharks and signing a contract with their American Hockey League (AHL) affiliate, the San Jose Barracuda, in 2016. The season after, he joined the organization of the Buffalo Sabres, signing a deal with their AHL counterpart, the Rochester Americans.

In 2018, Blackwell signed his first NHL contract, joining the Nashville Predators. Over two seasons, he managed to make his NHL debut and play his first games in the league, but he also split time with the Milwaukee Admirals in the AHL. At the conclusion of his contract, Blackwell signed with the New York Rangers, but for the next season, he was selected by the Seattle Kraken in the 2021 NHL expansion draft. During the Kraken's inaugural season, he was traded by the team to the Toronto Maple Leafs, with whom he would make his Stanley Cup playoff debut. In 2022, Blackwell joined the Chicago Blackhawks, and two seasons later, he signed with the Dallas Stars.

== Playing career ==
=== Junior ===
Blackwell was born on March 28, 1993, to parents Jim and Carla Blackwell in Lawrence, Massachusetts, but grew up in North Andover, Massachusetts. From 2004 until 2010, Blackwell played minor hockey with the Valley Junior Warriors. In 2010, Blackwell played with the Boston Junior Whalers, a spring/summer team, and he continued to be a coach with the program in later years.

Blackwell played high school hockey with St. John's Prep from 2007 to 2011. During the 2010–11 regular season, he recorded 26 goals and 24 assists for 50 points, as well as a +42 rating. In the Division 1A tournament, he tallied 16 points in five games, bringing his totals that season to 66 points in 25 games. Due to his performance, he received the Mr. Hockey Award from ESPN Boston for being the top male high school player. In 2022, he was inducted into the St. John's Prep Athletics Hall of Fame. Prior to the 2011 NHL entry draft, Blackwell was ranked 173rd out of all North American skaters. On June 27, 2011, during the draft, Blackwell was selected by the San Jose Sharks in the seventh round, 194th overall.

=== Collegiate ===
In 2011, Blackwell started his collegiate career with the Harvard Crimson of ECAC Hockey. He made his collegiate debut on November 4 against Princeton, and he scored his first goal on November 12 against Colgate. He was named ECAC Hockey Rookie of the Week for the week of November 29. During the ECAC semifinals on March 16, 2012, Blackwell registered four assists, the most of any Harvard player since 2002, as part of a 6–1 victory over Cornell. He finished the 2011–12 season with five goals and 14 assists for 19 points. Blackwell was named a semifinalist for the Walter Brown Award, given to the best American-born college hockey player in New England.

During 2012–13 season, Blackwell was affected by two concussions four months apart, forcing him to take time off from college and miss most of the season. That season, he had totaled three goals and 11 assists for 14 points in only 21 games. Due to his symptoms, he also missed the entirety of the 2013–14 season. After missing 26 of 31 games of the 2014–15 season, Blackwell returned to the team in late February 2015. On March 6, in the ECAC Tournament, he scored two goals against Brown, and he scored once more against them the next game. On March 21, Blackwell scored an empty net goal in a 4–2 victory over Colgate to help Harvard win the ECAC Tournament. He finished the season with 11 games played, achieving five goals and an assist.

Near the beginning of the 2015–16 season, it was announced that Blackwell would play the entirety of the campaign. On January 9, 2016, in a game at Madison Square Garden against Quinnipiac, Blackwell scored a goal and recorded two assists in a 5–4 overtime loss. Through 28 games that season, he achieved six goals and 13 assists, his 19 total points matching his career-high which he set in his first year. Due to his performance, the New England Hockey Writers awarded Blackwell the Joe Tomasello Unsung Hero Award.

=== Professional ===
==== San Jose Sharks and Buffalo Sabres organizations ====
Following his final season at Harvard, Blackwell began his professional career with the San Jose Sharks organization. On September 20, 2016, Blackwell was named to the roster of the Sharks' training camp. On October 3, he was reassigned from the Sharks' training camp to the training camp of the San Jose Barracuda, the American Hockey League (AHL) affiliate of the Sharks. Blackwell made his AHL debut on October 15 against the Stockton Heat, also recording his first professional assist during the game. On November 25, 2016, Blackwell scored his first professional goal as part of a 4–1 win over the Bakersfield Condors. Blackwell finished the 2016–17 season with four goals and seven assists for 11 points in 57 games. He then played 15 games in the 2017 Calder Cup playoffs, scoring three goals.

As a free agent, Blackwell left the Sharks organization for the 2017–18 season. He was a late addition to the Buffalo Sabresrookie camp, joining one day before its start, replacing the injured Sean Malone. He then participated in the prospects challenge, a series of exhibition games, scoring two goals in the opening game and adding an assist in the next. Blackwell's success landed him a professional tryout offer with the Sabres' AHL affiliate, the Rochester Americans, which he signed on October 5, 2017. He produced 3 points in 8 games with the Americans before securing a contract with the team on October 31. By the end of the season, his points totals led all Americans forwards with 17 goals and 45 points in 61 games, with 10 games being missed due to injury. During the 2018 Calder Cup playoffs, Blackwell registered three points in three games.

==== Nashville Predators ====
On July 3, 2018, Blackwell signed his first NHL deal as a free agent, agreeing to a two-year, entry-level contract with the Nashville Predators. After attending the Predators training camp and playing in three preseason games, Blackwell was reassigned on October 1, 2018, to start the 2018–19 season with their AHL affiliate, the Milwaukee Admirals. Despite missing 27 games due to injury, Blackwell recorded 7 goals in 14 games to start the season, earning him his first call-up to the Predators on January 19, 2019. He made his NHL debut the same day, playing on the fourth line, in a 4–2 loss to the Florida Panthers at home. After playing three games with the Predators and averaging 10:41 of ice time, he was reassigned to the Admirals on January 24. He was recalled once more by the Predators on January 31, after having totaled seven goals in 16 games. After playing three more games to bring his total for the season up to six, was reassigned to the Admirals on February 7. With the Admirals, he finished the season with 14 goals and 12 assists in 43 games, his goal total being tied for fifth place on the team. During the 2019 Calder Cup playoffs, Blackwell scored one goal in five games.

On September 23, 2019, Blackwell was once again named to the Admirals' roster to start the 2019–20 season. After notching a goal and two assists in eight games with the Admirals, Blackwell was called up to the Predators on October 29, 2019, but he was reassigned to the Admirals the next day. From November 13 to December 1, Blackwell recorded a career-high nine-game point streak, scoring 12 points in that stretch. After having played 26 games with the Admirals, tallying six goals and 17 assists for 23 points, Blackwell was called up by the Predators on December 14. On December 23, Blackwell recorded his first NHL point, an assist, against the Arizona Coyotes. That same day, he was reassigned to the Admirals, and on December 27, he was once again recalled by the Predators. On January 9, 2020, Blackwell scored his first NHL goal as part of a 5–2 victory over the Chicago Blackhawks, the same game in which goaltender Pekka Rinne also scored a goal. In 27 games with the Predators, Blackwell totaled three goals and seven assists.

==== New York Rangers, Seattle Kraken, and Toronto Maple Leafs ====
On October 9, 2020, as a free agent, Blackwell signed a two-year contract with the New York Rangers. In the pandemic-delayed 2020–21 season. On January 24, 2021, Blackwell made his Rangers debut during a game against the Pittsburgh Penguins and scored his first goal with the team, despite a 3–2 loss. On January 31, Blackwell suffered an upper-body injury in a 5–4 overtime loss to the Penguins. He returned to play on February 12 after having missed four games. On March 28, Blackwell's 28th birthday, he scored a career-high two goals against the Washington Capitals. In a breakout season with the Rangers, Blackwell finished with 12 goals and 22 points through 47 games.

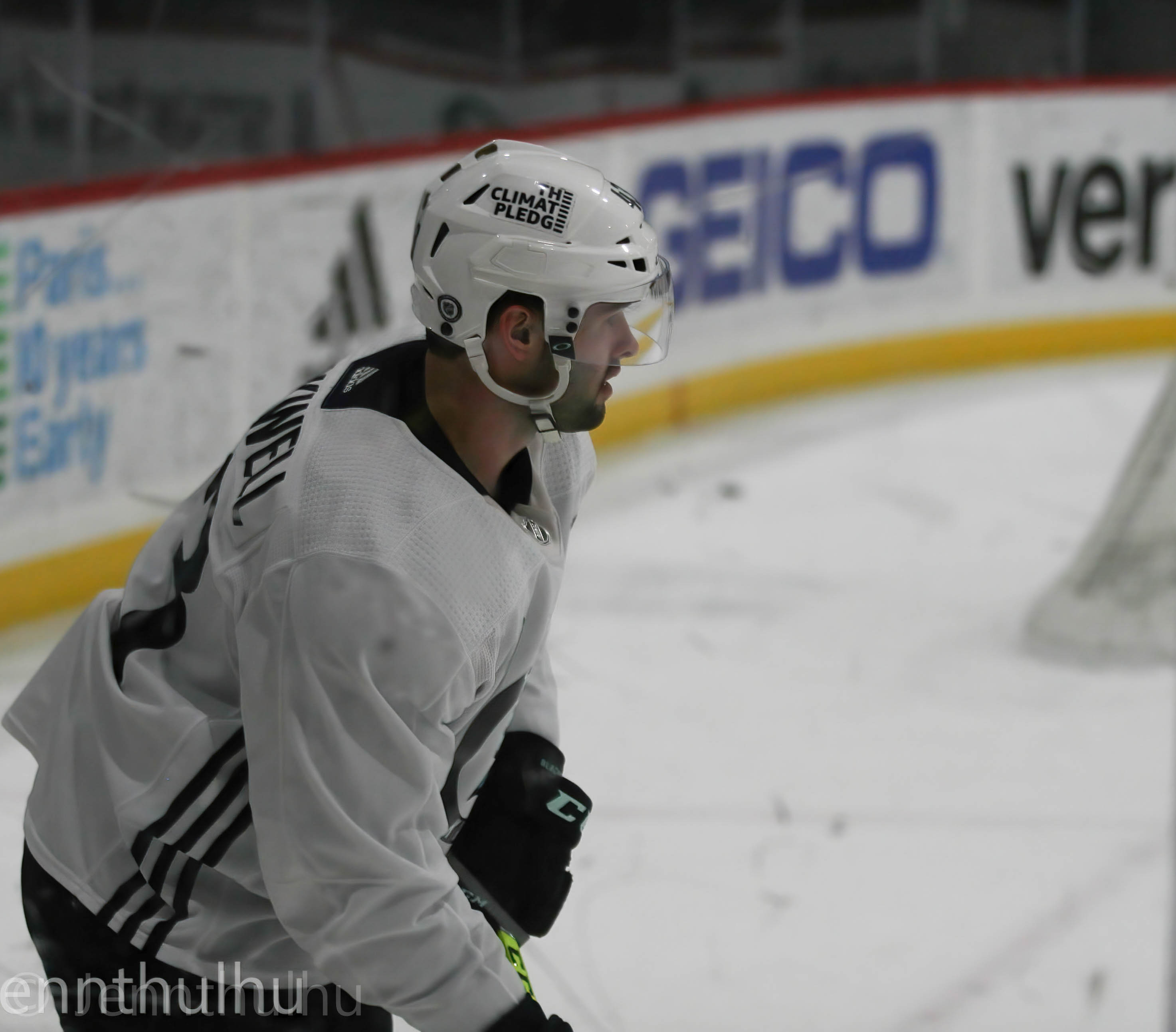
Blackwell with the Kraken in 2022

On July 21, 2021, Blackwell was selected from the Rangers at the 2021 NHL expansion draft by the Seattle Kraken. He scored his first goal as a Kraken on November 19 in a 7–3 loss to the Colorado Avalanche. Blackwell scored eight goals and 17 points in 38 games for the Kraken before being traded on March 20, 2022, to the Toronto Maple Leafs alongside Mark Giordano in exchange for second-round picks in 2022 and 2023 and a third-round pick in 2024. He notched two goals and three points in 19 games for Toronto to finish the regular season. Blackwell scored his first Stanley Cup playoff goal on May 6 against the Tampa Bay Lightning, and he would add an assist to total two points in seven playoff games.

==== Chicago Blackhawks and Dallas Stars ====
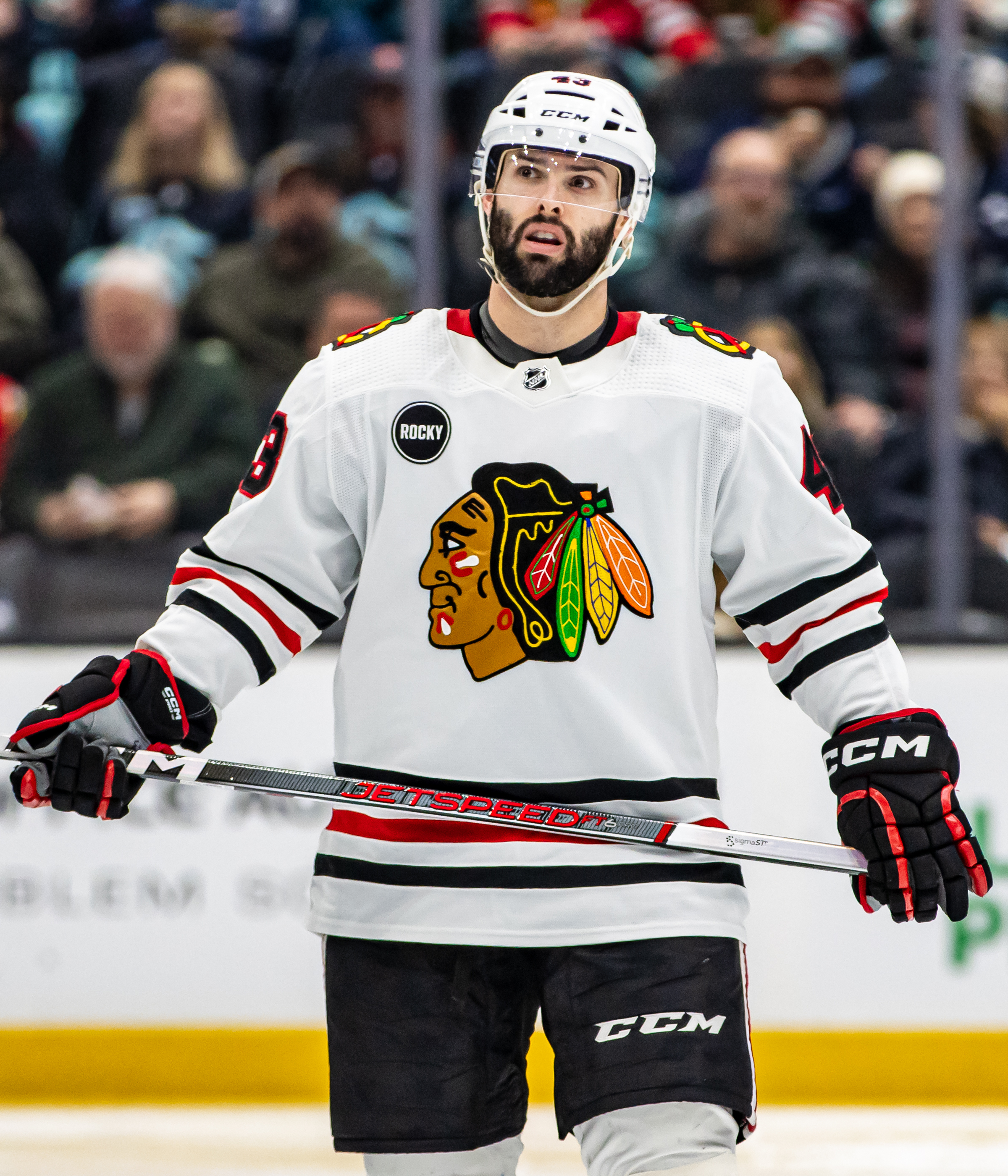
Blackwell with the Chicago Blackhawks in 2024

On July 13, Blackwell signed a two-year, $2.4 million contract with the Chicago Blackhawks as a free agent. During the 2022–23 season, Blackwell appeared in 53 games for the team, scoring two goals and eight assists, before suffering a season-ending sports hernia on March 23, 2023. On December 19, Blackwell was activated from the injured list, and he played his first game of the 2023–24 season the same day. Blackwell sustained an upper-body injury on March 20, 2024, causing him to miss six games, returning on April 6. The previous day, Blackwell had been named Chicago's nominee for the Bill Masterton Memorial Trophy, which is awarded to the league's player who "best exemplifies perseverance, sportsmanship, and dedication to hockey." Blackwell finished his injury-ridden season with eight goals and four assists for 12 points in 44 games.

After the conclusion of his contract with the Blackhawks, Blackwell signed a one-year, US$775,000 contract with the Dallas Stars on July 2, 2024. During the 2024–25 season, Blackwell managed six goals and 11 assists for 17 points through 63 games. On April 21, 2025, he scored the game-winning goal in overtime against the Colorado Avalanche in Game 2 of the first round of the 2025 Stanley Cup Playoffs. That one goal would be the only point he registered through 11 playoff games. On July 1, the Stars re-signed Blackwell to a two-year contract worth US$775,000 annually. During the 2025–26 season, Blackwell played in 70 games, tallying four goals and 11 assists for 15 points. During the 2026 Stanley Cup playoffs, he played in six games, scoring no points.

== International play ==
On May 13, 2021, Blackwell was named to the United States' roster for the 2021 IIHF World Championship. Blackwell served as an alternate captain, scoring four goals in 10 games during the tournament and helping the United States win the bronze medal.

== Career statistics ==
=== Regular season and playoffs ===
			Regular season					Playoffs
Season	Team	League	GP	G	A	Pts	PIM	GP	G	A	Pts	PIM
2010–11	St. John's Prep	USHS	25	33	33	66	10	—	—	—	—	—
2011–12	Harvard University	ECAC	34	5	14	19	46	—	—	—	—	—
2012–13	Harvard University	ECAC	21	3	11	14	10	—	—	—	—	—
2014–15	Harvard University	ECAC	11	5	1	6	6	—	—	—	—	—
2015–16	Harvard University	ECAC	28	6	13	19	12	—	—	—	—	—
2016–17	San Jose Barracuda	AHL	57	4	7	11	24	15	3	0	3	8
2017–18	Rochester Americans	AHL	61	17	28	45	23	3	1	2	3	0
2018–19	Milwaukee Admirals	AHL	43	14	12	26	22	5	1	0	1	4
2018–19	Nashville Predators	NHL	6	0	0	0	2	—	—	—	—	—
2019–20	Milwaukee Admirals	AHL	26	6	17	23	21	—	—	—	—	—
2019–20	Nashville Predators	NHL	27	3	7	10	10	—	—	—	—	—
2020–21	New York Rangers	NHL	47	12	10	22	15	—	—	—	—	—
2021–22	Seattle Kraken	NHL	39	8	9	17	4	—	—	—	—	—
2021–22	Toronto Maple Leafs	NHL	19	2	1	3	10	7	1	1	2	17
2022–23	Chicago Blackhawks	NHL	53	2	8	10	6	—	—	—	—	—
2023–24	Chicago Blackhawks	NHL	44	8	4	12	10	—	—	—	—	—
2024–25	Dallas Stars	NHL	63	6	11	17	16	11	1	0	1	6
2025–26	Dallas Stars	NHL	70	4	11	15	40	6	0	0	0	0
NHL totals			368	45	61	106	113	24	2	1	3	6

Medal record

Representing United States

Ice hockey

World Championships
Bronze medal – third place	2021 Latvia	

=== International ===
Year	Team	Event	Result	GP	G	A	Pts	PIM
2021	United States	WC	3rd place, bronze medalist(s)	10	4	0	4	6
Senior totals				10	4	0	4	6

== Awards and honors ==
Award	Year
College
Joe Tomasello Unsung Hero Award	2016
