= 2014–15 CCHL season =

- League: Central Canada Hockey League
- Sport: Hockey
- Duration: Regular season 2014-08-29 / 2015-03-06
- Teams: 12
- TV partner: FASTHockey
- Finals champions: Carleton Place Canadians

CCHL seasons
- 2013–14 2015–16

The 2014–15 CCHL season is the 54th season of the Central Canada Hockey League (CCHL). The twelve teams of the CCHL played 62-game schedules.

In March 2015, the top teams of the league played down for the Bogart Cup, the CCHL championship. The winners of the Bogart Cup competed in the Eastern Canadian Junior "A" championship, the Fred Page Cup. If successful against the winners of the Quebec Junior Hockey League and Maritime Junior A Hockey League, the champion would then move on to play in the Canadian Junior Hockey League championship, the Royal Bank Cup.

== Changes ==
- Overtime format:

The CCHL decided to adapt the American Hockey League's overtime format beginning with the 2014–15 season. Trials were conducted during the pre-season prior to its launch.

- The new overtime format is as follows:

Following tied games, teams will remain at the 3rd period ends and 7:00 minutes will be placed on the clock after a 30-second break. Each team will receive 1 point.

The first 3 minutes of over time will be played 4 on 4. At the first whistle after 3 minutes (i.e. if the clock reads 4:00 or less) the teams will play 3 on 3. The same penalty regulations apply. The games are again sudden victory with the first team to score collects an additional point.

In the event the game remains tied after the conclusion of seven minutes of overtime, a 30-second break during which the team coaches will provide a list of 3 shooters will precede a shoot out. Home teams shall determine if they shoot first or second. If the score after 3 rounds of shooters remains tied, there will be a continued sudden death single round shoot out until a winner is declared.

No shooter may shoot twice until all eligible shooters have shot once.

Players in the penalty box at the conclusion of overtime shall not be eligible to participate in the shoot out.

== Standings ==
Note: W = Wins; L = Losses; OTL = Overtime losses; SL = Shootout losses; GF = Goals for; GA = Goals against; PTS = Points; x = clinched playoff berth; y = clinched division title; z = clinched league title.

Robinson division
Team	Centre	W	L	OTL	SOL	GF	GA	Points
Carleton Place Canadians - z	Carleton Place, Ontario	49	10	2	1	245	131	101
Cornwall Colts - x	Cornwall, Ontario	38	18	4	2	211	170	82
Hawkesbury Hawks	Hawkesbury, Ontario	35	25	2	0	217	193	72
Brockville Braves - x	Brockville, Ontario	31	25	3	3	215	219	68
Smiths Falls Bears - x	Smiths Falls, Ontario	28	26	3	5	173	206	64
Kemptville 73's - x	Kemptville, Ontario	26	25	6	5	225	223	63
Yzerman division
Team	Centre	W	L	OTL	SOL	GF	GA	Points
Ottawa Jr. Senators - y	Ottawa, Ontario	44	13	4	1	244	147	93
Pembroke Lumber Kings - x	Pembroke, Ontario	42	13	4	3	266	174	91
Gloucester Rangers - x	Gloucester, Ontario	31	30	0	1	200	223	63
Nepean Raiders - x	Nepean, Ontario	23	35	0	4	169	215	50
Cumberland Grads	Navan, Ontario	15	43	2	2	139	272	34
Kanata Lasers	Kanata, Ontario	10	46	2	4	121	253	26

Teams listed on the official league website.

Standings listed on official league website.

== Season Leaders ==
=== Scoring leader ===
Note: GP = Games played; G = Goals; A = Assists; Pts = Points; PIM = Penalty minutes

Player / Team / GP / G / A / Pts / PIM; Chamberland, Felix / Pembroke Lumber Kings / 61 / 48 / 51 / 99 / 58

More on scoring leaders:

=== Goalie leader ===
Note: GP = Games played; Mins = Minutes played; W = Wins; L = Losses: OTL = Overtime losses; SL = Shootout losses; GA = Goals Allowed; SO = Shutouts; GAA = Goals against average

Player / Team / GP / Mins / W / L / OTL / SOL / SO / GA / GAA / Svs / Sv%; Clark, Adrian / Carleton Place Canadians / 28 / 1603:08 / 20 / 7 / 0 / 0 / 3 / 53 / 1.98 / 616 / .921

More on goaltending leaders:

=== Special teams leaders ===
==== Power play leader ====
Note: GP = Games played; PPGF = Power play goals for; ADV = Man Advantage Opportunities; PP% = Power play percentage; SHGA = Short Handed Goals Against

Team / GP / PPGF / ADV / PP% / SHGA; Pembroke Lumber Kings / 62 / 66 / 280 / 23.57 / 3

==== Penalty killing leader ====
Note: GP = Games played; PPGA = Power play goals against; TSH = Times Short Handed; PK% = Power killing percentage; SHGF = Short Handed Goals For

Team / GP / PPGA / TSH / PK% / SHGF; Carleton Place / 62 / 39 / 336 / 88.39 / 21

More on CCHL Special Teams:

== Streaks ==
- Wins

Carleton Place - 10, 10/13/14 -> 11/09/14

- Losses

Cumberland - 12, 02/06/15 ->

- Home Wins

Carleton Place - 9, 10/05/14 -> 11/14/14

- Home losses

Nepean - 7, 11/05/14 -> 12/07/14

- Road Wins

Carleton Place - 9, 01/09/15 ->

- Road losses

Kanata - 12, 11/02/14 -> 01/08/15

- More on CCHL streaks:

== 2015 Bogart Cup Playoffs ==
Playoff Format

Sudden Death Seeding
7	Smiths Falls	1
10	Nepean	2
8	Gloucester	2
9	Kemptville	0

Seeds 7 & 8
7	Gloucester
8	Nepean

Quarter-finals
1	Carleton Place	4
8	Nepean	0
4	Cornwall	4
5	Hawkesbury	2
2	Ottawa	4
7	Gloucester	0
3	Pembroke	4
6	Brockville	1

Semi-finals
1	Carleton Place	4
4	Cornwall	2
2	Ottawa	3
3	Pembroke	4

Bogart Cup Finals
1	Carleton Place	4
3	Pembroke	1

Playoff results are listed on the official league website.

== Fred Page Cup Championship ==
The 2015 edition of the Fred Page Cup was hosted by the Cornwall Colts in Cornwall, Ontario.

== Royal Bank Cup Championship ==
The Portage Terriers in Portage la Prairie, Manitoba greeted the winners of the Fred page Cup, the Dudley Hewitt Cup and the Western Canada Cup.

== Players selected in the 2015 NHL entry draft ==
Decided at conclusion of season.

== Awards ==
- Most Valuable Player - Stephen Baylis (Carlton Place Canadians)
- Top Rookie - Owen Guy (Kemptville 73's)
- Top Graduating Player - Marly Quince (Cornwall Colts)
- Top Defenceman - Robert Michel (Ottawa Jr. Senators)
- Top Prospect - Andrew Peski (Brockville Braves)
- Top Goaltender - Guillaume Therien (Carleton Place Canadians)
- Top Coach - Jason Clarke (Carleton Place Canadians)
- Top General Manager - Martin Dagenais (Ottawa Jr. Senators)

== See also ==
- 2014 Royal Bank Cup
- Fred Page Cup
- Quebec Junior AAA Hockey League
- Maritime Junior Hockey League
- 2013 in ice hockey
- 2014 in ice hockey

Preceded by 2013–14 CCHL season	CCHL seasons	Succeeded by 2015–16 CCHL season
