= 2013–14 CCHL season =

- League: Central Canada Hockey League
- Sport: Hockey
- Duration: Regular season 2013-08-30 – 2014-03-08; Playoffs; 2014-03-11 – 2014-04-20
- Teams: 12
- Finals champions: Carleton Place Canadians

CCHL seasons
- 2012–13 2014–15

The 2013–14 CCHL season was the 53rd season of the Central Canada Hockey League (CCHL). The twelve teams of the CCHL played 62-game schedules.

Come March, the top teams of the league played down for the Bogart Cup, the CCHL championship. The winner of the Bogart Cup competed in the Eastern Canadian Junior "A" championship, the Fred Page Cup. If successful against the winners of the Quebec Junior AAA Hockey League and Maritime Hockey League, the champion would then move on to play in the Canadian Junior Hockey League championship, the 2014 Royal Bank Cup.

== Changes ==
- Kanata Stallions become Kanata Lasers mid-season (January 2014)

== Current standings ==
Note: GP = Games played; W = Wins; L = Losses; OTL = Overtime losses; SL = Shootout losses; GF = Goals for; GA = Goals against; PTS = Points; x = clinched playoff berth; y = clinched division title.

Robinson Division
| Team | Centre | W–L–OTL–SOL | GF–GA | Points |
| xy-Carleton Place Canadians | Carleton Place, Ontario | 54-6-1-1 | 293-149 | 110 |
| x-Smiths Falls Bears | Smiths Falls, Ontario | 41-17-3-1 | 238-174 | 86 |
| x-Brockville Braves | Brockville, Ontario | 35-24-2-1 | 216-200 | 73 |
| x-Cornwall Colts | Cornwall, Ontario | 30-22-3-7 | 180-190 | 70 |
| x-Kemptville 73's | Kemptville, Ontario | 26-30-3-3 | 210-232 | 58 |
| Hawkesbury Hawks | Hawkesbury, Ontario | 18-39-4-1 | 149-248 | 41 |
Yzerman Division
| Team | Centre | W–L–OTL–SOL | GF–GA | Points |
| xy-Ottawa Jr. Senators | Ottawa, Ontario | 39-20-0-3 | 259-185 | 81 |
| x-Pembroke Lumber Kings | Pembroke, Ontario | 37-19-2-4 | 229-184 | 80 |
| x-Nepean Raiders | Nepean, Ontario | 27-24-4-7 | 189-225 | 65 |
| Gloucester Rangers | Gloucester, Ontario | 23-32-4-3 | 219-280 | 53 |
| Cumberland Grads | Navan, Ontario | 21-31-4-6 | 170-217 | 52 |
| Kanata Lasers | Kanata, Ontario | 21-34-1-6 | 192-260 | 49 |

Teams listed on the official league website.

Standings listed on official league website.

== 2014 Bogart Cup Playoffs ==
Quarter-finals
1 | Carleton Place | 4
8 | Kemptville | 0
4 | Pembroke | 4
5 | Brockville | 2
2 | Smiths Falls | 4
7 | Nepean | 0
3 | Ottawa | 4
6 | Cornwall | 1

Semi-finals
1 | Carleton Place | 4
4 | Pembroke | 3
2 | Smiths Falls | 4
3 | Ottawa | 3

Bogart Cup Finals
1 | Carleton Place | 4
2 | Smiths Falls | 1

Playoff results are listed on the official league website.

== Fred Page Cup Championship ==
Hosted by the St. Jerome Panthers in Saint-Jerome, Quebec. The Carleton Place Canadians represented the league at the event and won it.

Round Robin

Carleton Place Canadians 6 - St-Jérôme Panthers (QJAAAHL) 4
Carleton Place Canadians 4 - Granby Inouk (QJAAAHL) 2
Carleton Place Canadians 2 - Truro Bearcats (MHL) 1

Final

Carleton Place Canadians 3 - St-Jérôme Panthers (QJAAAHL) 1

== 2014 Royal Bank Cup ==
Hosted by the Vernon Vipers in Vernon, British Columbia. The Carleton Place Canadians represented the CCHL and Eastern Canada and finished in the second, with an overtime loss in the final.

Round Robin

Carleton Place Canadians 3 - Vernon Vipers (BCHL) 2
Dauphin Kings (MJHL) 4 - Carleton Place Canadians 3 OT
Carleton Place Canadians 4 - Toronto Lakeshore Patriots (OJHL) 2
Yorkton Terriers (SJHL) 3 - Carleton Place Canadians 1

Semi-final

Carleton Place Canadians 5 - Dauphin Kings (MJHL) 3

Final

Yorkton Terriers (SJHL) 4 - Carleton Place Canadians 3 OT

== Scoring leaders ==
Note: GP = Games played; G = Goals; A = Assists; Pts = Points; PIM = Penalty minutes

| Player | Team | GP | G | A | Pts | PIM |
|---|---|---|---|---|---|---|
| Andy Sturtz | Carleton Place | 58 | 51 | 53 | 104 | 96 |
| Evan Peterson | Carleton Place | 60 | 34 | 62 | 96 | 29 |
| Greg Jansz | Gloucester | 60 | 29 | 61 | 90 | 22 |
| Ryan Collins | Ottawa | 61 | 33 | 49 | 82 | 20 |
| Max Veronneau | Gloucester | 61 | 41 | 39 | 80 | 10 |
| Nathan Todd | Brockville | 60 | 38 | 41 | 79 | 36 |
| Ryan Cusin | Brockville | 55 | 32 | 40 | 72 | 23 |
| Stefano Momesso | Smiths Falls | 62 | 26 | 46 | 72 | 30 |
| Mark Petaccio | Pembroke | 52 | 33 | 38 | 71 | 113 |
| Victor Beaulac | Smiths Falls | 62 | 21 | 50 | 71 | 54 |

== Leading goaltenders ==
Note: GP = Games played; Mins = Minutes played; W = Wins; L = Losses: OTL = Overtime losses; SL = Shootout losses; GA = Goals Allowed; SO = Shutouts; GAA = Goals against average

| Player | Team | GP | Mins | W | L | OTL | SOL | SO | GA | GAA | Svs | Sv% |
|---|---|---|---|---|---|---|---|---|---|---|---|---|
| Brett Magnus | Nepean | 36 | 1839:40 | 15 | 8 | 2 | 3 | 4 | 87 | 2.84 | 1045 | 0.923 |
| Guillaume Therien | Carleton Place | 41 | 2346:06 | 27 | 9 | 2 | 1 | 1 | 98 | 2.51 | 1099 | 0.918 |
| Jordan Piccolino | Cornwall | 27 | 1530:50 | 14 | 8 | 1 | 3 | 2 | 65 | 2.55 | 724 | 0.918 |
| Darren Smith | Pembroke | 44 | 2523:52 | 24 | 13 | 1 | 3 | 1 | 118 | 2.81 | 1292 | 0.916 |
| Cory Simic | Smiths Falls | 33 | 1764:20 | 20 | 7 | 0 | 2 | 3 | 71 | 2.41 | 746 | 0.913 |

== Players selected in 2014 NHL entry draft ==
- Rd 7 #189 Kelly Summers - Ottawa Senators (Carleton Place Canadians)

== Awards ==
- Most Valuable Player - Andy Sturtz (Carleton Place)
- Most Sportsmanlike - Ryan Collins (Ottawa)
- Leading Scorer - Andy Sturtz (Carleton Place)
- Top Rookie - Neil Doef (Smiths Falls)
- Top Graduating Player - Victor Beaulac (Smiths Falls)
- Top Defenceman - Victor Beaulac (Smiths Falls)
- Top Prospect - Kelly Summers (Carleton Place)
- Top Goaltender - Guillaume Therien (Carleton Place)
- Top Coach - Jason Clarke (Carleton Place)
- Top General Manager - Jason Clarke (Carleton Place)
- Lowest GAA - Guillaume Therien and Justin Laforest (Carleton Place)
- Nielsen-Peckett Award - Alex Stothart (Kanata)
- All-Rookie Team - Neil Doef (Smiths Falls), Zach Senychyn (Smiths Falls), Matt Foget (Gloucester), Kris Myllari (Kanata), Andrew Peski (Brockville), Doug Johnston (Gloucester)
- All-Academic Team - Alex Stothart (Kanata), Bobby Williams (Cumberland), Michael Vered (Nepean), Ryan Kuffner (Gloucester), Alex Row (Kemptville), Michael Pinios (Smiths Falls)

== See also ==
- 2014 Royal Bank Cup
- Fred Page Cup
- Quebec Junior AAA Hockey League
- Maritime Junior Hockey League
- 2013 in ice hockey
- 2014 in ice hockey

| Preceded by 2012–13 CCHL season | CCHL seasons | Succeeded by 2014–15 CCHL season |
