= 2026–27 CCHL season =

66th year of the CCHL

- League: CCHL
- Sport: Junior ice hockey
- Duration: Regular season September–March
- Games: 330
- Teams: 12
- Streaming partner: FloSports

CCHL seasons
- ← 2025–26 2027–28 →

The 2026–27 season is the 66th of the Central Canada Hockey League (CCHL).

The Pembroke Royals was established as an expansion franchise as a result of a legal dispute between the league and the owner of the defunct Pembroke Lumber Kings franchise over ownership of the Lumber Kings name. The league terminated the membership of the former Lumber Kings owner over allegations of "harassing and mistreating players and failing to operate the business in an ethical manner." Notably, the Lumber Kings were once suspended by the league for the 1979–80 season and were replaced by a club called the Royals.

The CCHL, and five other Ontario junior ice hockey leagues, adopted several rule changes pursuant to Hockey Canada's "Ontario Men's Junior Hockey Development pilot project". The initiative included a "transition" to the Ontario Hockey League (OHL) rule book and adopting International Ice Hockey Federation (IIHF) Rule 202 for facial protection. The initiative also aimed to address "severe regional imbalances" with roster-related rule changes.

Following a change of ownership, the Renfrew Wolves appointed Carl Robillard as its general manager, and Devin Campbell as its head coach. Mr. Robillard is a former general manager of the Rockland Nationals.

The Brockville Braves hired Andy Bryan as head coach.

The Cornwall Colts hired Christian Lajoie as head coach and general manager.

Teams play 55 regular season games and the best eight teams will advance to the post-season playoffs.

== Sources ==
- Dixon, Anthony (9 December 2025). "Pembroke Lumber Kings' coach and GM hit with extended suspension". Pembroke Observer & News. Postmedia.
- "Renfrew Wolves announce change in ownership". thecchl.ca. Central Canada Hockey League. 29 June 2026.
- "CCHL Announces Sale of New Pembroke Lumber Kings League Membership". thecchl.ca (Press release). Central Canada Hockey League. 10 July 2026.
- "Ontario Superior Court Refuses to Reinstate Former Member of the CCHL; League Welcomes New Member in Pembroke". thecchl.ca (Press release). Central Canada Hockey League. 31 July 2026.
- "Carleton Place Junior A and Junior B hockey clubs announce new ownership". thecchl.ca (Press release). Central Canada Hockey League. 2 September 2026.
- Dixon, Anthony (25 September 2026). "Pembroke, Royals reach agreement to bring CCHL hockey to PMC". Pembroke Observer & News. Postmedia. "The Royals are a new CCHL franchise replacing the former Pembroke Lumber Kings and have begun their inaugural season this fall."
- Dyson, Dylan (14 September 2026). "Pembroke's junior hockey team changes name to 'Royals' for new season". CTVNews. Bell Media.
- Dixon, Anthony (16 April 2026). "Alex Armstrong officially removed as Pembroke Lumber Kings owner". Pembroke Observer & News. Postmedia.
