= Pembroke Memorial Centre =

Multi-purpose arena in Pembroke, Ontario, Canada

- PMC
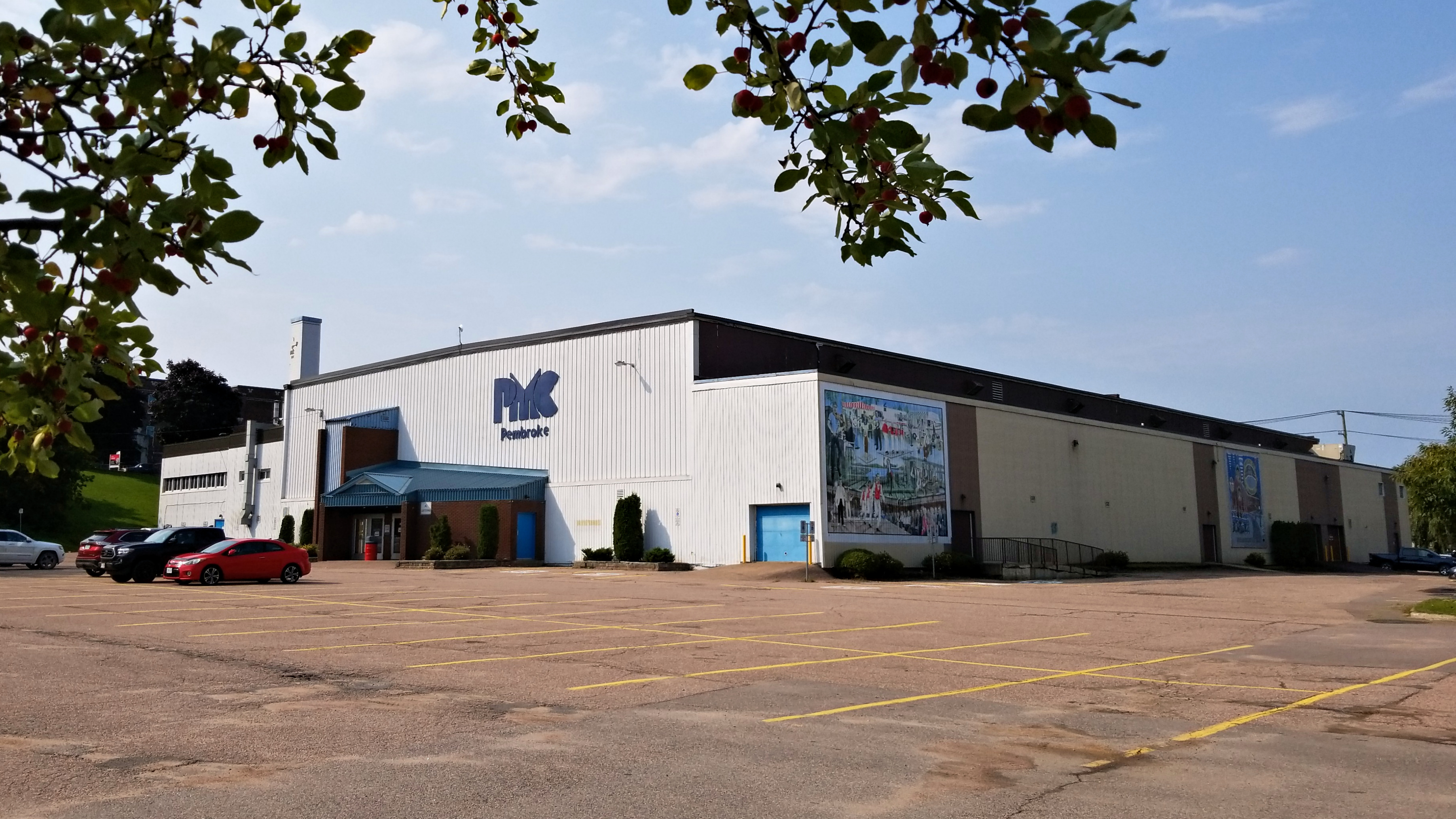
- Interactive map of Pembroke Memorial Centre
- Address: 393 Pembroke Street West
- Location: Pembroke, Ontario, Canada
- Coordinates: 45°49′25.7974″N 77°7′15.09″W
- Owner: City of Pembroke
- Operator: Pembroke Lumber Kings
- Capacity: 2,250 (3,750 with standing room)
- Record attendance: 5,262
- Field size: 200 feet (61 m) x 85 feet (26 m)

Construction
- Groundbreaking: November 18, 1948
- Opened: November 11, 1951

Tenant
- Pembroke Royals

Pembroke Memorial Centre (PMC) is a 2,250-seat multi-purpose arena in Pembroke, Ontario, Canada. It is the home of the Pembroke Royals of the Central Canada Hockey League (CCHL). Alongside the Pembroke & Area Community Centre, it is one of the city's two ice hockey arenas.

The grand opening was celebrated on Remembrance Day, 1951, with an exhibition game between the Pembroke Senior Lumber Kings and the Montreal Canadiens on Remembrance Day. Several future hall of famers played in the game for the Canadiens, including Maurice Richard, 'Bernie Geoffrion, Elmer Lach and Doug Harvey. NHL president Clarence Campbell attended the sold-out game, and participated in a ceremonial puck drop as part of the pre-game festivities which saw nearly 5,000 people in attendance. It was named as a tribute to soldiers who served in World War I and World War II.

The PMC was the home of the Pembroke Senior Lumber Kings until 1958. Subsequently, it was the home of the now-defunct Pembroke Lumber Kings. In 2026, it became the home of the Pembroke Royals hockey club.
