= Pembroke Royals =

Junior ice hockey club

- City: Pembroke, Ontario
- League: CCHL
- Founded: 2026
- Home arena: Pembroke Memorial Centre
- Colours
- Owner: Brian Johnstone
- General manager: Kevin Rosebrugh
- Head coach: Kevin Rosebrugh
- Website: pembrokeroyals.ca

The Pembroke Royals is a junior ice hockey club and franchise of the Central Canada Hockey League (CCHL). The team plays its home games at the Pembroke Memorial Centre in Pembroke, Ontario.

The club was established as a new franchise in 2026 as a result of legal a dispute between the league and the owner of the defunct Pembroke Lumber Kings franchise over ownership of the Lumber Kings name. The league terminated the membership of the former Lumber Kings owner over allegations of "harassing and mistreating players and failing to operate the business in an ethical manner." Notably, the Lumber Kings were once suspended by the league for the 1979–80 season and were replaced by a club called the Royals.

== Sources ==
- Dixon, Anthony (9 December 2025). "Pembroke Lumber Kings' coach and GM hit with extended suspension". Pembroke Observer & News. Postmedia.
- "CCHL Announces Sale of New Pembroke Lumber Kings League Membership". thecchl.ca (Press release). Central Canada Hockey League. 10 July 2026.
- "Ontario Superior Court Refuses to Reinstate Former Member of the CCHL; League Welcomes New Member in Pembroke". thecchl.ca (Press release). Central Canada Hockey League. 31 July 2026.
- "Carleton Place Junior A and Junior B hockey clubs announce new ownership". thecchl.ca (Press release). Central Canada Hockey League. 2 September 2026.
- Dixon, Anthony (25 September 2026). "Pembroke, Royals reach agreement to bring CCHL hockey to PMC". Pembroke Observer & News. Postmedia. "The Royals are a new CCHL franchise replacing the former Pembroke Lumber Kings and have begun their inaugural season this fall."
- Dyson, Dylan (14 September 2026). "Pembroke's junior hockey team changes name to 'Royals' for new season". CTVNews. Bell Media.
- Dixon, Anthony (16 April 2026). "Alex Armstrong officially removed as Pembroke Lumber Kings owner". Pembroke Observer & News. Postmedia.
