= 2017 Fred Page Cup =

Eastern Region Jr A Championship

Tournament details
- Venue: La Cite du Sport in Terrebonne, Quebec
- Dates: May 3, 2017 – May 7, 2017
- Host team: Terrebonne Cobras

Final positions
- Champions: Terrebonne Cobras
- Runners-up: Carleton Place Canadians

Tournament statistics
- Games played: 8
- Scoring leader: Loik Leveille (TER) (7 pts)

The 2017 Fred Page Cup was the 23rd Canadian Eastern Junior A Ice Hockey Championship for the Canadian Junior Hockey League. The Terrebonne Cobras hosted for the second time in team history. The tournament was held May 3 to May 7 at La Cite du Sport in Terrebonne, Quebec. The Carleton Place Canadians of the CCHL entered the tournament as the 3-time defending champions. The tournament champions qualified for the 2017 Royal Bank Cup, held in Cobourg, Ontario and hosted by the OJHL's Cobourg Cougars at the Cobourg Community Centre.

== Teams ==
- Terrebonne Cobras (Host and LHJQ Champions )

Regular Season: 44-5-0 (1st LHJQ Alexandre Burrows Division)
Playoffs: Defeated Princeville (4-0), Defeated St-Leonard (4-1), Defeated Longueuil (4-1) to win the league.

- Longueuil Collège Français (QJHL Runner-Up)

Regular Season: 43-4-2 (1st LHJQ Martin St-Louis Division)
Playoffs: Defeated Sainte-Agathe (4-1), Defeated Granby (4-2), Defeated by Terrebonne (1-4).

- Truro Bearcats (MHL Champion)

Regular Season: 35-13-2 (2nd MHL South Division)
Playoffs: Defeated Yarmouth (4-1), Defeated Amherst (4-1), Defeated Miramichi (4-3) to win league.

- Carleton Place Canadians (CCHL Champion)

Regular Season: 50-12-0 (1st CCHL Robinson Division)
Playoffs: Defeated Nepean (4-1), Defeated Kemptville (4-2), Defeated Ottawa (4-1) to win league.

== Tournament ==
=== Round Robin ===
x = Clinched championship round berth; y = Clinched first overall

FPC Round Robin
Rank	Team	League	W-OTW-L-OTL	GF	GA	Pts.
1	Terrebonne Cobras	Host QJHL	1-2-0-0	19	11	7
2	Collège Français de Longueuil	QJHL	1-1-0-1	10	8	5
3	Carleton Place Canadians	CCHL	1-0-0-2	11	11	5
4	Truro Bearcats	MHL	0-0-3-0	7	17	0

Tie Breaker: Head-to-Head, then 3-way +/-.

==== Results ====
Round Robin results
Game	Away team	Score	Home team	Score	Notes
1	Carleton Place Canadians	1	Collège Français de Longueuil	2	Final/SO
2	Truro Bearcats	2	Terrebonne Cobras	8	Final
3	Collège Français de Longueuil	6	Truro Bearcats	4	Final
4	Terrebonne Cobras	8	Carleton Place Canadians	7	Final/SO
5	Carleton Place Canadians	3	Truro Bearcats	1	Final
6	Collège Français de Longueuil	2	Terrebonne Cobras	3	Final/SO

=== Semifinals and final ===
Championship Round
Game	Away team	Score	Home team	Score	Notes
Saturday May 6
Semi-final	Carleton Place Canadians	2	Collège Français de Longueuil	0	Final
Sunday May 7
Final	Carleton Place Canadians	2	Terrebonne Cobras	5	Final
