= 2017–18 CCHL season =

57th season of the CCHL

- League: Central Canada Hockey League
- Sport: Ice hockey
- Duration: Regular season September–March
- Games: 62
- Teams: 12
- Total attendance: 118,329

League championship
- Bogart Cup: Ottawa Jr. Senators
- Runners-up: Carleton Place Canadians

Regional championship
- Champions: Ottawa Jr. Senators
- Runners-up: Longueuil Collège Français

CCHL seasons
- ← 2016–17 2018–19 →

The 2017–18 CCHL season was the 57th season of the Central Canada Hockey League (CCHL). Teams played a 62-game regular-season schedule. The league championship Ottawa Jr. Senators and runners-up Carleton Place Canadians both competed at the Eastern Canada championship 2018 Fred Page Cup, which was hosted by the Ottawa Jr. Senators. The Ottawa Jr. Senators won the Eastern Canada championship and went on to compete for the 2018 Royal Bank Cup at the national championship tournament in Chilliwack, British Columbia.

== Season highlights ==
The team formerly known as the Gloucester Rangers relocated and became the Rockland Nationals.

After winning the league championship Bogart Cup and the Eastern Canada championship 2018 Fred Page Cup, the Ottawa Jr. Senators went on to compete at the 2018 Royal Bank Cup national championship tournament in Chilliwack, British Columbia. The Senators were eliminated in the semi-final round by the Chilliwack Chiefs.

=== Awards ===
- Most Valuable Player: David Jankowski (Hawkesbury Hawks)
- Top Rookie: Jack Quinn (Kanata Lasers)
- Outstanding Defenceman: Tim Theocharidis (Carleton Place Canadians)
- Sportsmanship/ability award: David Jankowski (Hawkesbury Hawks)
- Top Prospect: Jack Quinn (Kanata Lasers)
- Outstanding graduating player: David Jankowski (Hawkesbury Hawks)
- Arthur K. Nielsen scholarship award: Geoff Kitt (Carleton Place Canadians)
- Scoring champion: David Jankowski (Hawkesbury Hawks)
- Top Goaltender: Liam Lascelle (Cornwall Colts)
- Top Coach: Jesse Winchester (Brockville Braves)
- Top General Manager: Jason Clarke (Carleton Place Canadians)

Source: "Season award archives". thecchl.ca.

== Regular season ==
Teams played 62 regular season games, including 6 games against teams in the same division, 6 games against two of the teams in the other division, and 5 games against the remaining 4 teams from the other division. The top 8 teams overall advanced to the post-season.

Robinson division
Team	Centre	GP	W	L	OTL	SOL	GF	GA	Pts
Carleton Place Canadians	Carleton Place, Ontario	62	53	5	1	3	257	105	110
Brockville Braves	Brockville, Ontario	62	38	20	2	2	210	160	80
Kanata Lasers	Kanata, Ontario	62	31	22	8	1	185	190	71
Pembroke Lumber Kings	Pembroke, Ontario	62	32	25	4	1	213	223	69
Smiths Falls Bears	Smiths Falls, Ontario	62	24	31	3	4	158	196	55
Kemptville 73's	Kemptville, Ontario	62	18	40	2	2	159	267	40

Source: "2017–18 Central CCHL standings". hockeydb.com.

Yzerman division
Team	Centre	GP	W	L	OTL	SOL	GF	GA	Pts
Ottawa Jr. Senators	Ottawa, Ontario	62	46	9	2	5	254	142	99
Hawkesbury Hawks	Hawkesbury, Ontario	62	36	23	0	3	200	176	75
Cornwall Colts	Cornwall, Ontario	62	33	23	4	2	193	183	72
Rockland Nationals	Rockland, Ontario	62	28	28	3	3	186	204	62
Nepean Raiders	Nepean, Ontario	62	24	32	2	4	169	196	54
Navan Grads	Cumberland, Ontario	62	9	52	1	0	130	272	19

Source: "2017–18 Central CCHL standings". hockeydb.com.

== Post-season ==
2018 League championship
Bogart Cup

Tournament details
- Dates: 14 March – 21 April
- Teams: 8
- Defending champions: Carleton Place Canadians

Final positions
- Champions: Ottawa Jr. Senators
- Runners-up: Carleton Place Canadians

Tournament statistics
- Games played: 38
- Goals scored: 234 (6.16 per game)
- Attendance: 22,988 (605 per game)

The top 8 teams after the regular season advanced to the playoffs. In the final round, the 2nd place Ottawa Jr. Senators defeated the 1st place Carleton Place Canadians in 5 games. The Ottawa Jr. Senators and the Carleton Place Canadians both advanced to the 2018 Fred Page Cup Eastern Canada championship hosted by the Ottawa Jr. Senators.

Quarter-finals
Carleton Place	4
Rockland	1
Hawkesbury	4
Cornwall	3
Brockville	4
Kanata	0
Ottawa	4
Pembroke	2

Semi-finals
Carleton Place	4
Hawkesbury	0
Brockville	3
Ottawa	4

Bogart Cup Finals
Carleton Place	1
Ottawa	4

Source: "2017–18 CCHL playoff results". hockeydb.com.

== Eastern Canada championship ==
2018 Eastern Canada championship
Fred Page Cup

Tournament details
- Teams: 4
- Defending champions: Carleton Place Canadians

Final positions
- Champions: Ottawa Jr. Senators
- Runners-up: Longueuil Collège Français
- Third place: Edmundston Blizzard

Tournament statistics
- Games played: 8
- Goals scored: 52 (6.5 per game)

Official website
- Hockey Canada

The Ottawa Jr. Senators hosted the 2018 Fred Page Cup Eastern Canada championship tournament. The other competitors were the Carleton Place Canadians of the CCHL; the Longueuil Collège Français of the QJHL; and the Edmundston Blizzard of the MHL. The Carleton Place Canadians were eliminated from competition after losing 3 straight games in the preliminary round-robin phase. The Ottawa Jr. Senators defeated the Longueuil Collège Français 10–1 in the championship match and advanced to the national championship 2018 Royal Bank Cup.

	Round-robin	OJS	LCF	EB	CPC
1	Ottawa Jr. Senators		3-2	4-1	3-2
2	Longueuil Collège Français	2-3		6-3	2-1
3	Edmundston Blizzard	1-4	3-6		5-3
4	Carleton Place Canadians	2-3	1-2	3-5	

Semifinals		Finals
Edmundston Blizzard	1
Longueuil Collège	5
Longueuil Collège	5	Longueuil Collège	1
		Ottawa Jr. Senators	10

== National championship ==
The Ottawa Jr. Senators advanced to the 2018 Royal Bank Cup national championship tournament hosted by the Chilliwack Chiefs of the British Columbia Hockey League in Chilliwack, British Columbia. The Senators were eliminated from competition after losing to the Chilliwack Chiefs in the semi-final. The Chilliwack Chiefs went on to defeat the Wellington Dukes of the Ontario Junior Hockey League in the final match.

== Sources ==
- "2017–18 CCHL standings". hockeydb.com.
- Svoboda, Paul (8 May 2018). "The ABC's of the RBC: National Jr. A hockey field finalized as Steinbach captures ANAVET Cup". Bellevue Intelligencer. Postmedia.
- "2018 RBC Cup | National Junior A Hockey Championship". hockeycanada.ca.
- Svoboda, Paul (11 May 2018). "Dukes face former Bulls goalie in all-Ontario opener at RBC Cup in BC". Bellevue Intelligencer. Postmedia.
- Bailey, Jim (7 May 2018). "Wenatchee Wild wins Doyle Cup, off to national championship". Trail Times. Black Press Media.
- Clarke, Ted (13 May 2018). "Pateman gets call as RBC Cup referee". Prince George Citizen.
- "CCHL announces divisional realignment". thecchl.ca. 30 July 2017.
