= 2012–13 CCHL season =

- League: Central Canada Hockey League
- Sport: Hockey
- Duration: Regular season 2012-09-07 – 2013-03-10; Playoffs; 2013-03-13 – 2013-04-24
- Teams: 12
- Finals champions: Cornwall Colts

CCHL seasons
- 2011–12 2013–14

The 2012–13 CCHL season was the 52nd season of the Central Canada Hockey League (CCHL). The twelve teams of the CCHL played 62-game schedules.

Come March, the top teams of the league played down for the Bogart Cup, the CCHL championship. The winner of the Bogart Cup competed in the Eastern Canadian Junior "A" championship, the Fred Page Cup. If successful against the winners of the Quebec Junior AAA Hockey League and Maritime Hockey League, the champion would then move on to play in the Canadian Junior Hockey League championship, the 2013 Royal Bank Cup.

== Changes ==
- None

== Current Standings ==
Note: GP = Games played; W = Wins; L = Losses; OTL = Overtime losses; SL = Shootout losses; GF = Goals for; GA = Goals against; PTS = Points; x = clinched playoff berth; y = clinched division title; z = clinched conference title

Robinson Division
Team	Centre	W–L–OTL–SOL	GF–GA	Points
Carleton Place Canadians	Carleton Place, Ontario	40-19-1-2	248-164	83
Cornwall Colts	Cornwall, Ontario	36-17-5-4	250-196	81
Brockville Braves	Brockville, Ontario	35-20-3-4	215-192	77
Smiths Falls Bears	Smiths Falls, Ontario	36-22-1-3	235-183	76
Hawkesbury Hawks	Hawkesbury, Ontario	29-26-2-5	176-183	65
Kemptville 73's	Kemptville, Ontario	15-44-1-2	152-295	33
Yzerman Division
Team	Centre	W–L–OTL–SOL	GF–GA	Points
Ottawa Jr. Senators	Ottawa, Ontario	40-16-2-4	220-175	86
Nepean Raiders	Nepean, Ontario	38-20-0-4	235-182	80
Pembroke Lumber Kings	Pembroke, Ontario	38-20-1-3	235-185	80
Kanata Stallions	Kanata, Ontario	28-29-3-2	192-237	61
Gloucester Rangers	Gloucester, Ontario	19-35-5-3	166-246	46
Cumberland Grads	Navan, Ontario	18-38-3-3	189-275	42

Teams listed on the official league website.

Standings listed on official league website.

== 2012-13 Bogart Cup Playoffs ==
Quarter-finals
1	Ottawa	4
8	Hawkesbury	0
4	Nepean	4
5	Pembroke	0
2	Carleton Place	4
7	Smiths Falls	1
3	Cornwall	4
6	Brockville	2

Semi-finals
1	Ottawa	3
4	Nepean	4
2	Carleton Place	3
3	Cornwall	4

Bogart Cup Finals
4	Nepean	2
3	Cornwall	4

Playoff results are listed on the official league website.

== Fred Page Cup Championship ==
Hosted by the Truro Bearcats in Truro, Nova Scotia. The Cornwall Colts finished 3rd.

Round Robin

Summerside Western Capitals (MHL) 1 - Cornwall Colts 0
Truro Bearcats (MHL) 6 - Cornwall Colts 2
Cornwall Colts 5 - Longueuil College Francais (QJAAAHL) 4

Semi-final

Summerside Western Capitals (MHL) 1 - Cornwall Colts 0 OT

== Scoring leaders ==
Note: GP = Games played; G = Goals; A = Assists; Pts = Points; PIM = Penalty minutes

Player	Team	GP	G	A	Pts	PIM
Michael Pontarelli	Cornwall Colts	53	52	55	107	16
Ben Blasko	Brockville Braves	62	33	67	100	22
Dalen Hedges	Nepean Raiders	57	38	52	90	38
Roman Ammirato	Hawkesbury Hawks	61	34	49	83	38
Ryan Collins	Ottawa Jr. Senators	61	31	48	79	32
Chris Maniccia	Smiths Falls Bears	54	34	44	78	30
Kenneth Neil	Nepean Raiders	61	21	56	77	36
David Ferreira	Brockville Braves	58	38	37	75	38
Derian Plouffe	Kanata Stallions	57	35	33	68	24
Ben Robillard	Ottawa Jr. Senators	53	31	37	68	30

== Leading goaltenders ==
Note: GP = Games played; Mins = Minutes played; W = Wins; L = Losses: OTL = Overtime losses; SL = Shootout losses; GA = Goals Allowed; SO = Shutouts; GAA = Goals against average

Player	Team	GP	Mins	W	L	OTL	SOL	SO	GA	GAA	Svs	Sv%
Jimmy Howe	Smiths Falls Bears	25	1324:54	13	7	1	1	1	52	2.35	650	0.926
Ryan Mulder	Nepean Raiders	28	1557:42	18	7	0	1	4	68	2.62	825	0.924
Darren Smith	Pembroke Lumber Kings	36	2049:47	24	8	0	3	1	93	2.72	1057	0.919
Carmine Guerriero	Hawkesbury Hawks	51	2953:35	23	21	2	5	4	133	2.70	1507	0.919
Matt Zawadzki	Nepean Raiders	37	2169:27	20	13	0	3	1	103	2.85	1130	0.916

== Players selected in 2013 NHL entry draft ==
- Rd 6 #179 Blaine Byron - Pittsburgh Penguins (Smiths Falls Bears)

== Awards ==
- Most Valuable Player - Michael Pontarelli (Cornwall Colts)
- Most Sportsmanlike - Michael Pontarelli (Cornwall Colts)
- Leading Scorer - Michael Pontarelli (Cornwall Colts)
- Top Rookie - Kelly Summers (Carleton Place Canadians)
- Top Graduating Player - Ben Blasko (Brockville Braves)
- Top Defenceman - Curtis Watson (Kanata Stallions)
- Top Prospect - Blaine Byron (Smiths Falls Bears)
- Top Goaltender - Carmine Guerrero (Hawkesbury Hawks)
- Top Coach - Rick Dorval (Ottawa Jr. Senators)
- Top General Manager - Jason Clarke (Carleton Place Canadians)

== See also ==
- 2013 Royal Bank Cup
- Fred Page Cup
- Quebec Junior AAA Hockey League
- Maritime Junior Hockey League
- 2012 in ice hockey
- 2013 in ice hockey

Preceded by 2011–12 CCHL season	CCHL seasons	Succeeded by 2013–14 CCHL season
