= Brayden Jaw =

Canadian-born Chinese ice hockey player

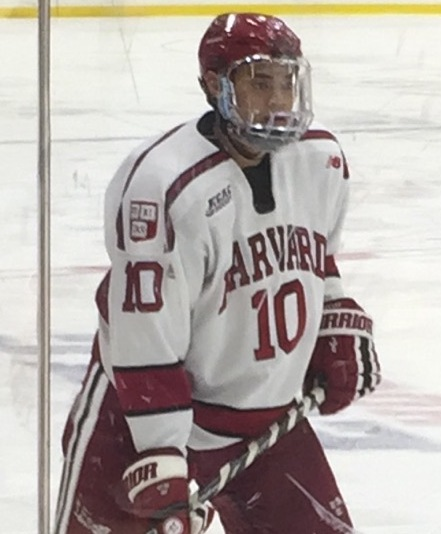
- Born: April 24, 1992 (age 34) Vancouver, British Columbia, Canada
- Height: 6 ft 3 in (191 cm)
- Weight: 200 lb (91 kg; 14 st 4 lb)
- Position: Defense / Forward
- Shot: Right
- Played for: Orlando Solar Bears; Kunlun Red Star
- Playing career: 2016–2020

Brayden Jaw (simplified Chinese: 赵传礼; traditional Chinese: 趙傳禮; pinyin: Zhào Chuánlǐ; born April 24, 1992) is a Canadian-born Chinese ice hockey player. After playing NCAA Division I Ice Hockey at Harvard University, he signed with the Kunlun Red Stars of the Kontinental Hockey League (KHL).

== Playing career ==
Brayden Jaw played with the Greater Vancouver Canadians in the BCMML league in 2007-08; the Surrey Eagles (BCHL) in 2008-10; the Nanaimo Clippers (BCHL) from 2009-2011; and the Surrey Eagles (BCHL) in 2011-2012. In 2012, he went on to play NCAA Division I Men’s Ice Hockey for the Harvard Crimsons. During his time at Harvard, his team won the ECAC Hockey championship in the 2014-2015 season.

Following his collegiate career, Jaw went on to play hockey where he signed in 2017 with the Beijing Kunlun Red Stars until 2020.

== International play ==
Jaw was part of the Chinese hockey development team for the 2022 Winter Olympics in Beijing.

== Personal life ==
Jaw attended St. George's School in Vancouver, British Columbia and went on to get a Bachelor of Arts at Harvard University with a concentration in economics and a secondary concentration in psychology. He also completed his MBA from MIT Sloan School of Management in 2023.
