= Kelly Summers =

Canadian ice hockey player (born 1996)

- Born: April 29, 1996 (age 30) Golden Lake, Ontario, Canada
- Height: 6 ft 1 in (185 cm)
- Weight: 196 lb (89 kg; 14 st 0 lb)
- Position: Defenseman
- Shoots: Right
- NPHL team Former teams: Madawaska Valley Wolves: Clarkson Golden Knights; Adirondack Thunder; Binghamton Devils; ETC Crimmitschau; Nottingham Panthers (EIHL)
- NHL draft: 189th overall, 2014; Ottawa Senators
- Playing career: 2014–present

Kelly Summers (born April 29, 1996) is a Canadian ice hockey defenseman who plays for the Madawaska Valley Wolves of the Northern Premier Hockey League. He has played professionally in the American Hockey League for the Binghamton Devils and Adirondack Thunder and most recently played for the Nottingham Panthers of the EIHL. He was an All-American for Clarkson.

== Playing career ==
Summers had a tremendous season of junior hockey as an 18-year old, averaging more than a point per game and helping the Carleton Place Canadians win the Fred Page Cup. After the season Summers was drafted by the Ottawa Senators in the NHL draft. He began attending Clarkson University that fall and debuted for the ice hockey team. Summers provided steady production from the blueline and improved each season in terms of his offensive numbers. For his senior season, Summers became one of the top players in college hockey, nearly doubling his point production and helping the Golden Knights reach the ECAC championship game. That season, Clarkson made the NCAA Tournament for the first time in a decade and while their appearance was short-lived, it was a huge step for the program.

After graduating, Summers signed a contract with the ECHL's Adirondack Thunder and produced well as a rookie. Near the end of the year he signed a PTO (professional try-out) contract with the Ottawa Senators AHL affiliate Belleville Senators but didn't play in any games for the squad. After resigning with Adirondack, Summers finally got a shot at the AHL when he was loaned to the Binghamton Devils for nine games.

Summers' time in the minor leagues was cut short when the COVID-19 pandemic ended the 2019–20 season prematurely and then caused the following year to be delayed.

Instead of waiting around for his chance to play, Summers travelled to Germany to play for ETC Crimmitschau, where he remained for two years - but sat out the 2021–22 season due to a shoulder injury.

On 12 July 2022, Summers was revealed to be the latest signing for the Nottingham Panthers.

After one season with Nottingham, Summers returned to Canada and joined the Madawaska Valley Wolves in the semi-professional Eastern Ontario Senior Hockey League, now the Northern Premier Hockey League.

== Personal life ==
Summers' cousin Mike Sullivan also played college hockey. Coincidentally, he too played four years at Clarkson.

== Career statistics ==
=== Regular season and playoffs ===
			Regular season					Playoffs
Season	Team	League	GP	G	A	Pts	PIM	GP	G	A	Pts	PIM
2009–10	Ottawa Valley Titans U14 AAA	HEO U14	27	1	17	18	10	6	2	2	4	2
2010–11	Ottawa Valley Titans U15 AAA	HEO U15	30	3	19	22	12	10	2	6	8	14
2011–12	Ottawa Valley Titans U16 AAA	OEHL U16	30	9	22	31	20	8	3	6	9	6
2011–12	Carleton Place Canadians	CCHL	2	0	0	0	0	—	—	—	—	—
2012–13	Carleton Place Canadians	CCHL	59	13	20	33	14	12	1	1	2	4
2013–14	Carleton Place Canadians	CCHL	56	17	43	60	12	16	5	8	13	4
2014–15	Clarkson	ECAC Hockey	33	6	4	10	4	—	—	—	—	—
2015–16	Clarkson	ECAC Hockey	37	3	11	14	20	—	—	—	—	—
2016–17	Clarkson	ECAC Hockey	39	3	14	17	30	—	—	—	—	—
2017–18	Clarkson	ECAC Hockey	40	6	24	30	35	—	—	—	—	—
2018–19	Adirondack Thunder	ECHL	49	5	19	24	21	4	0	0	0	6
2019–20	Adirondack Thunder	ECHL	44	9	15	24	28	—	—	—	—	—
2019–20	Binghamton Devils	AHL	9	1	0	1	0	—	—	—	—	—
2020–21	ETC Crimmitschau	DEL2	42	6	22	28	20	—	—	—	—	—
2021–22	ETC Crimmitschau	DEL2	0	0	0	0	0	—	—	—	—	—
2022–23	Nottingham Panthers	EIHL	54	7	20	27	18	4	0	3	3	2
CCHL totals			117	30	63	93	26	28	6	9	15	8
NCAA totals			149	18	53	71	89	—	—	—	—	—
ECHL totals			93	14	34	48	49	4	0	0	0	6

== Awards and honors ==
Award	Year
All-ECAC Hockey First Team	2017–18
AHCA East Second Team All-American	2017–18
