= Sean Malone (ice hockey) =

American professional ice hockey forward (born 1995)

- Born: April 30, 1995 (age 31) Buffalo, New York, U.S.
- Height: 6 ft 0 in (183 cm)
- Weight: 190 lb (86 kg; 13 st 8 lb)
- Position: Center
- Shoots: Left
- SHL team Former teams: Örebro HK; Buffalo Sabres; Nashville Predators; SCL Tigers
- NHL draft: 159th overall, 2013; Buffalo Sabres
- Playing career: 2017–present

Sean Malone (born April 30, 1995) is an American professional ice hockey forward, currently under contract with Örebro HK in the Swedish Hockey League (SHL). He formerly played with the Buffalo Sabres and Nashville Predators of the National Hockey League (NHL).

== Playing career ==
After a successful career at Nichols School, where he was All-State in three sports, Malone was drafted by the Buffalo Sabres in the sixth round, 159th overall, in the 2013 NHL entry draft. He played college hockey for Harvard University of ECAC Hockey. During his junior and senior years at Harvard, he underwent hip surgery and rehabilitation for his injury. Despite his setbacks, he was signed to a professional contract by the Sabres on April 8, 2017, and made his NHL debut that night in a game against the Florida Panthers as an emergency replacement for Marcus Foligno. He had one shot on net and played over 12 minutes in the 3–0 loss to the Panthers.

After participating in the Buffalo Sabres development camp in July 2017, Malone was unable to participate at the Sabres' rookie camp, the Prospects Challenge tournament, and training camp due to another injury. He was then assigned to the Sabres AHL affiliate, the Rochester Americans, for the 2017–18 season.

On June 25, 2019, Malone opted to remain within the Sabres organization, signing a one-year AHL contract to continue with the Rochester Americans. In the 2019–20 season, Malone in his third season with the Americans appeared in 58 games, placing second on the team in scoring by tallying 30 points, before the season was cancelled due to the COVID-19 pandemic.

As a free agent, Malone was able to secure an NHL contract by agreeing to a one-year, two-way contract with the Nashville Predators on July 15, 2020. Malone opened the pandemic delayed 2020–21 season with the Predators, registering an assist in his lone game with the club. He later reassigned to AHL affiliate, the Chicago Wolves, for the remainder of the year.

As a free agent from the Predators, Malone opted to return to his original club, the Buffalo Sabres, agreeing to a one-year, two-way contract on July 28, 2021.

On August 2, 2023, having left the Sabres at the conclusion of his contract, Malone opted to pursue a European career by signing a two-year contract with Swiss club, SCL Tigers of the National League (NL).

After concluding his two-year tenure with SCL Tigers, having established himself amongst as a team offensive contributor, Malone left as a free agent and continued his European career in signing a two-year contract with Swedish top flight club, Örebro HK of the SHL, on June 3, 2025.

== Career statistics ==
=== Regular season and playoffs ===
			Regular season					Playoffs
Season	Team	League	GP	G	A	Pts	PIM	GP	G	A	Pts	PIM
2010–11	Nichols School	USHS	14	3	9	12	4	3	3	3	6	0
2011–12	Nichols School	USHS	47	51	54	105	22	1	0	1	1	0
2012–13	U.S. National Development Team	USHL	15	5	8	13	17	—	—	—	—	—
2013–14	Harvard University	ECAC	31	6	14	20	16	—	—	—	—	—
2014–15	Harvard University	ECAC	21	8	10	18	12	—	—	—	—	—
2015–16	Harvard University	ECAC	27	10	9	19	8	—	—	—	—	—
2016–17	Harvard University	ECAC	36	18	24	42	16	—	—	—	—	—
2016–17	Buffalo Sabres	NHL	1	0	0	0	0	—	—	—	—	—
2017–18	Rochester Americans	AHL	73	12	10	22	29	3	0	2	2	0
2018–19	Rochester Americans	AHL	38	4	9	13	4	—	—	—	—	—
2019–20	Rochester Americans	AHL	58	12	18	30	26	—	—	—	—	—
2020–21	Nashville Predators	NHL	1	0	1	1	2	—	—	—	—	—
2020–21	Chicago Wolves	AHL	23	5	10	15	38	—	—	—	—	—
2021–22	Rochester Americans	AHL	39	20	17	37	22	10	2	5	7	4
2022–23	Rochester Americans	AHL	53	14	17	31	38	14	3	6	9	6
2023–24	SCL Tigers	NL	51	13	24	37	16	—	—	—	—	—
2024–25	SCL Tigers	NL	39	7	23	30	36	9	2	2	4	4
NHL totals			2	0	1	1	2	—	—	—	—	—

=== International ===
Year	Team	Event	Result	GP	G	A	Pts	PIM
2012	United States	IH18	7th	4	0	1	1	2
2013	United States	U18	2nd place, silver medalist(s)	7	0	1	1	0
Junior totals				11	0	2	2	2

== Awards and honors ==
Award	Year
College
ECAC All-Tournament Team	2017
