= 2014 Royal Bank Cup =

National Junior A Championship

Tournament details
- Venue: Kal Tire Place in Vernon, British Columbia
- Dates: May 10, 2014 – May 18, 2014
- Host team: Vernon Vipers

Final positions
- Champions: Yorkton Terriers (1st title)
- Runners-up: Carleton Place Canadians

Tournament statistics
- Games played: 13
- Scoring leader: Colton Sparrow (Vernon)

Awards
- MVP: Mike Stiliadis (Dauphin)

The 2014 Royal Bank Cup was the 44th Junior "A" ice hockey National Championship for the Canadian Junior Hockey League. The 2014 Royal Bank Cup marked the 44th consecutive year a national championship has been awarded to this skill level since the breakaway of Major Junior hockey in 1970.

The five competitors that competed in the Royal Bank Cup included the host Vernon Vipers, the winners of the Fred Page Cup, Dudley Hewitt Cup, and the top two teams from the Western Canada Cup.

The tournament was hosted by the Vernon Vipers of Vernon, British Columbia.

== Teams ==
- Vernon Vipers (Host)

Regular Season: 30-18-4-6 (7th BCHL)
Playoffs: Defeated West Kelowna (4-2), Defeated Penticton (4-3), 1st in Semi-final round Robin (2-0), Lost to Coquitlam (0-4) in league final.

- Carleton Place Canadians (Eastern)

Regular Season: 54-6-1-1 (1st CCHL)
Playoffs: Defeated Kemptville (4-0), Defeated Pembroke (4-3), Defeated Smiths Falls (4-1) to win league, Won Fred Page Cup (4-0)

- Yorkton Terriers (Western)

Regular Season: 37-12-0-7 (1st SJHL)
Playoffs: Defeated Notre Dame (4-1), Defeated Humboldt (4-1), Defeated Melville (4-0) to win league, Won Western Canada Cup (3-2).

- Dauphin Kings (Western Runner-Up)

Regular Season: 40-17-0-3 (3rd MJHL)
Playoffs: Defeated OCN (4-0), Defeated Virden (4-0), Lost to Winnipeg (1-4) in league final, Runner-up at Western Canada Cup (4-2).

- Toronto Lakeshore Patriots (Central)

Regular Season: 35-12-0-6 (3rd OJHL)
Playoffs: Defeated Toronto (4-0), Defeated North York (4-1), Defeated Georgetown (4-0), Defeated Aurora (4-2) to win league, Won Dudley Hewitt Cup (4-1).

== Tournament ==
=== Round Robin ===
Royal Bank Cup Round Robin
Rank	Team	League	Ticket	W–L–OTL	GF	GA
1	x-Dauphin Kings	MJHL	Western Canada Cup #2	3-0-1	12	8
2	x-Vernon Vipers	BCHL	Host	2-2-0	13	14
3	x-Yorkton Terriers	SJHL	Western Canada Cup #1	2-2-0	10	13
4	x-Carleton Place Canadians	CCHL	Fred Page Cup	2-1-1	11	11
5	Toronto Lakeshore Patriots	OJHL	Dudley Hewitt Cup	1-2-1	10	10

(x-) Denotes semi-final berth.

==== Schedule and results ====
All games played in Vernon, BC.

Game	Away team	Score	Home team	Score	Notes
May 10, 2014
1	Toronto Lakeshore Patriots	1	Dauphin Kings	2	Final - Shots: 42-29 TLP
2	Vernon Vipers	2	Carleton Place Canadians	3	Final - Shots: 29-27 CPC
May 11, 2014
3	Yorkton Terriers	1	Toronto Lakeshore Patriots	5	Final - Shots: 32-23 TLP
4	Carleton Place Canadians	3	Dauphin Kings	4	OT Final - Shots: 35-34 DK
May 12, 2014
5	Yorkton Terriers	4	Vernon Vipers	6	Final - Shots: 44-33 YT
May 13, 2014
6	Toronto Lakeshore Patriots	2	Carleton Place Canadians	4	Final - Shots: 33-26 CPC
7	Vernon Vipers	2	Dauphin Kings	5	Final - Shots: 31-21 VV
May 14, 2014
8	Carleton Place Canadians	1	Yorkton Terriers	3	Final - Shots: 37-26 YT
May 15, 2014
9	Dauphin Kings	1	Yorkton Terriers	2	OT Final - Shots: 36-33 DK
10	Toronto Lakeshore Patriots	2	Vernon Vipers	3	OT Final - Shots: 46-24 VV

=== Semi-final ===
Game	Away team	Score	Home team	Score	Notes
May 17, 2014
SF1	Yorkton Terriers	6	Vernon Vipers	3	Final - Shots: 37-31 VV
SF2	Carleton Place Canadians	5	Dauphin Kings	3	Final - Shots: 34-32 CPC

=== Final ===
Game	Team	Score	Team	Score	Notes
May 18, 2014
F	Carleton Place Canadians	3	Yorkton Terriers	4	OT Final - Shots: 46-35 YT

== Awards ==
Roland Mercier Trophy (Tournament MVP): Mike Stiliadis (Dauphin)
Top Forward: Colton Sparrow (Vernon)
Top Defencemen: Mike Praps (Toronto Lakeshore)
Top Goaltender: Mike Stiliadis (Dauphin)
Tubby Smaltz Trophy (Sportsmanship): Brett D'Andrea (Carleton Place)
Top Scorer: Colton Sparrow (Vernon)

== Roll of League Champions ==
AJHL: Spruce Grove Saints
BCHL: Coquitlam Express
CCHL: Carleton Place Canadians
MHL: Truro Bearcats
MJHL: Winnipeg Blues
NOJHL: Kirkland Lake Gold Miners
OJHL: Toronto Lakeshore Patriots
QJAAAHL: Granby Inouk
SJHL: Yorkton Terriers
SIJHL: Fort Frances Lakers

== See also ==
- Canadian Junior A Hockey League
- Royal Bank Cup
- Western Canada Cup
- Dudley Hewitt Cup
- Fred Page Cup
