= Matt Iacopelli =

American professional ice hockey winger (born 1994)

- Born: May 15, 1994 (age 32) Woodhaven, Michigan, U.S.
- Height: 6 ft 2 in (188 cm)
- Weight: 207 lb (94 kg; 14 st 11 lb)
- Position: Right wing
- Shot: Left
- Played for: Rockford IceHogs
- NHL draft: 83rd overall, 2014; Chicago Blackhawks
- Playing career: 2017–2024

Matheson Iacopelli (born May 15, 1994) is an American former professional ice hockey winger. He was drafted 83rd overall by the Chicago Blackhawks in the 2014 NHL Draft.

== Playing career ==
=== Amateur ===
Iacopelli joined the Muskegon Lumberjacks of the USHL during the 2013–14 season. He was the leading scorer for Muskegon as a 19-year-old USHL rookie, as he led the league with 41 goals and had 23 assists in 58 regular season games. He was also +12 with 47 penalty minutes that season. He was named to the All-USHL first team. Although older than most draft-eligible prospects, he was rated as the 98th best prospect going into the 2014 NHL Draft by Central Scouting. Central Scouting director Dan Marr described him as a "late bloomer". He was then drafted in the 3rd round, 83rd overall, by the Chicago Blackhawks in the 2014 NHL Draft. The Black Hawks traded Brandon Bollig to the Calgary Flames in exchange for the pick used to select Iacopelli.

During the 2014–15 season, Iacopelli scored 23 goals for Muskegon in his second USHL season, sharing the team lead with Tom Marchin. He had 14 assists and was -16 with 38 penalty minutes that year as well.

Iacopelli had already committed to playing college hockey at Western Michigan in 2014-15 in September. He left the USHL and committed to the NCAA for the Western Michigan Broncos of the NCHC. He struggled in his freshman season with Western Michigan in 2015–16, scoring only 1 goal in 27 games, but was far more effective in his sophomore season. According to Iacopelli "I never really had to use my body, or protect the puck in the corners, stuff like that. Definitely, last year was a bit of an adjustment. The players are faster, stronger, bigger. This year I think I'm utilizing my size and learning how to protect the puck." He ended up scoring 20 goals and had 16 assists in 40 games that season, and helped get Western Michigan into the 2017 NCAA Division I men's ice hockey tournament.

=== Professional ===
After his sophomore season with the Broncos in the 2016–17 season, Iacopelli opted to end his collegiate career in agreeing to a two-year entry-level contract with the Chicago Blackhawks on March 29, 2017. He immediately joined AHL affiliate, the Rockford IceHogs, to play out the remainder of the year.

During the 2018–19 season, while stagnating within the Blackhawks AHL and ECHL affiliate's, Iacopelli was traded by Chicago to the Los Angeles Kings in exchange for Spencer Watson on February 24, 2019. He was assigned to play out the remainder of the season with the Manchester Monarchs of the ECHL.

Having completed his entry-level contract with the Kings, Iacopelli was not tendered a qualifying offer and was released to free agency on June 25, 2019. Unable to attract NHL interest, Iacopelli agreed to a contract with the Kalamazoo Wings of the ECHL on September 9, 2019. After three seasons with the Kalamazoo Wings, Iacopelli was traded to the Jacksonville Icemen in exchange for future considerations on March 14, 2023.

== Personal ==
Iacopelli is the son of Marco Iacopelli and Victoria DePalma. He has two sisters and two brothers. Iacopelli graduated from Woodhaven High School in 2012.

== Career statistics ==
			Regular season					Playoffs
Season	Team	League	GP	G	A	Pts	PIM	GP	G	A	Pts	PIM
2011–12	Texas Tornado	NAHL	1	0	0	0	0	—	—	—	—	—
2012–13	Springfield Jr. Blues	NAHL	4	3	1	4	0	—	—	—	—	—
2013–14	Muskegon Lumberjacks	USHL	58	41	23	64	47	—	—	—	—	—
2014–15	Muskegon Lumberjacks	USHL	56	23	14	37	38	11	5	2	7	10
2015–16	Western Michigan University	NCHC	27	1	6	7	6	—	—	—	—	—
2016–17	Western Michigan University	NCHC	40	20	16	36	20	—	—	—	—	—
2016–17	Rockford IceHogs	AHL	8	1	3	4	0	—	—	—	—	—
2017–18	Rockford IceHogs	AHL	50	11	8	19	10	—	—	—	—	—
2017–18	Indy Fuel	ECHL	10	9	1	10	0	—	—	—	—	—
2018–19	Rockford IceHogs	AHL	27	2	2	4	19	—	—	—	—	—
2018–19	Indy Fuel	ECHL	9	4	0	4	4	—	—	—	—	—
2018–19	Manchester Monarchs	ECHL	12	2	3	5	6	1	0	0	0	0
2019–20	Kalamazoo Wings	ECHL	41	16	15	31	31	—	—	—	—	—
2021–22	Kalamazoo Wings	ECHL	61	21	15	36	33	—	—	—	—	—
2022–23	Kalamazoo Wings	ECHL	46	16	13	29	23	—	—	—	—	—
2022–23	Jacksonville Icemen	ECHL	12	4	4	8	4	12	4	1	5	4
2023–24	Jacksonville Icemen	ECHL	60	27	13	40	26	7	1	1	2	4
AHL totals			85	14	13	27	29	—	—	—	—	—

== Awards and honours ==
Award	Year
USHL
All-Star Game	2014
First All-Star Team	2014
