= Corey Schueneman =

American ice hockey player (born 1995)

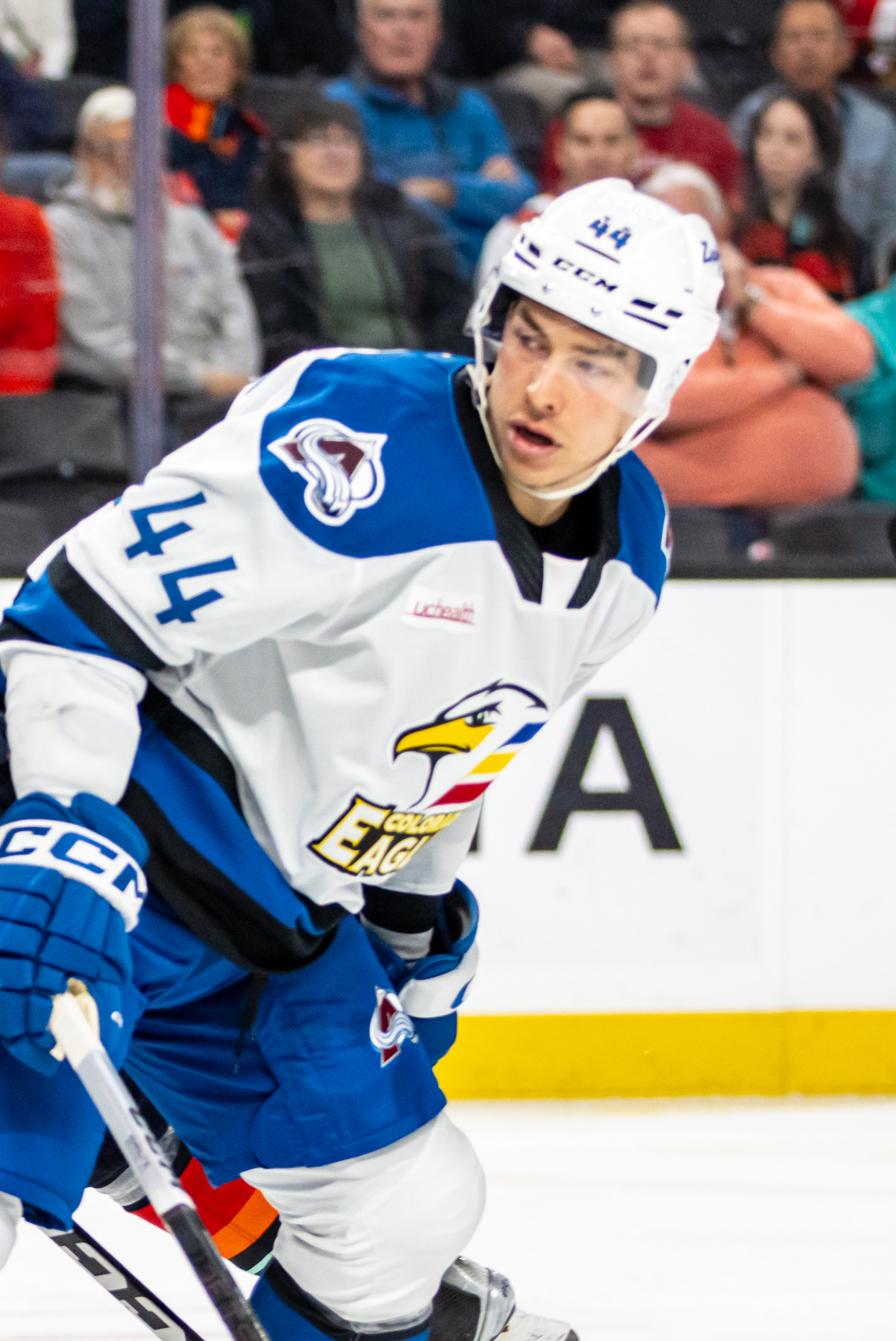
- Schueneman with the Colorado Eagles in 2024
- Born: September 2, 1995 (age 31) Milford, Michigan, U.S.
- Height: 6 ft 0 in (183 cm)
- Weight: 196 lb (89 kg; 14 st 0 lb)
- Position: Defense
- Shoots: Left
- NHL team (P) Cur. team Former teams: Anaheim Ducks; San Diego Gulls (AHL); Montreal Canadiens; St. Louis Blues
- NHL draft: Undrafted
- Playing career: 2019–present

Corey Schueneman (born September 2, 1995) is an American professional ice hockey defenseman currently playing for the San Diego Gulls of the American Hockey League (AHL) while under contract to the Anaheim Ducks of the National Hockey League (NHL). Originally undrafted by teams in the NHL, Schueneman has also previously played for the Montreal Canadiens and St Louis Blues.

== Playing career ==
Schueneman played junior hockey in the United States Hockey League (USHL) with the Muskegon Lumberjacks and the Des Moines Buccaneers before committing to a collegiate career with the Western Michigan Broncos of the National Collegiate Hockey Conference (NCHC).

As an undrafted free agent, Schueneman following a four-year collegiate career and captaining the Broncos in his senior year, Schueneman was signed on an amateur try-out contract for the remainder of the 2018–19 season and also a one-year AHL contract for the following season with the Stockton Heat, the primary affiliate of the Calgary Flames, on March 22, 2019.

After splitting the 2019–20 season, with the Heat and the Kansas City Mavericks of the ECHL, Schueneman left the Heat as a free agent and was signed to a one-year AHL contract with the Laval Rocket on July 3, 2020.

In the following pandemic delayed 2020–21 season, Schueneman collected 7 points through his first 21 games with the Rocket before signing a one-year, two-way contract for the following season with the Rocket's NHL affiliate, the Montreal Canadiens, on April 2, 2021.

Schueneman began the 2021–22 season with the Rocket before earning his first recall to the NHL on December 8, 2021. He was later returned to the AHL before earning a second recall and making his long-awaited NHL debut with the Canadiens, registering an assist in a 5–4 overtime defeat to the Tampa Bay Lightning on December 28, 2021. Continuing to split time between the Rocket and the Canadiens, he scored his first NHL goal in a March 17, 2022 game against the Dallas Stars. The goal was mistakenly announced in the arena as his second career goal, to which he quipped "I didn't hear it, but if I have another one there I'll gladly take it." He would indeed manage a second goal that season, as part of a 5–4 shootout victory against the Lighting on April 2.

The Canadiens signed Schueneman to a one-year, two-way contract on July 7, 2022.

Following two seasons under contract with the Canadiens organization, Schueneman left as a free agent and was signed to a one-year, two-way contract with the Colorado Avalanche on July 1, 2023. In the 2023–24 season, Schueneman played exclusively with the Avalanches AHL affiliate, the Colorado Eagles, adding a veteran presence to the blueline in posting appeared 22 points (four goals, 18 assists) in 64 regular season games. He was recalled once to the Avalanche to add insurance from injury to the defense however did not feature with the club.

As a free agent from the Avalanche at the conclusion of his contract, Schueneman was signed to a one-year, two-way contract with the St. Louis Blues on July 1, 2024. On November 3, 2025, in the final year of his contract, Schueneman was traded to the Washington Capitals in exchange for Calle Rosen.

Schueneman left the Capitals as a free agent at the conclusion his contract and was signed to a two-year, two-way agreement with the Anaheim Ducks on July 1, 2026.

== Career statistics ==
			Regular season					Playoffs
Season	Team	League	GP	G	A	Pts	PIM	GP	G	A	Pts	PIM
2011–12	Muskegon Lumberjacks	USHL	1	0	0	0	0	—	—	—	—	—
2012–13	Michigan Warriors	NAHL	35	5	9	14	24	—	—	—	—	—
2012–13	Muskegon Lumberjacks	USHL	1	0	0	0	0	—	—	—	—	—
2012–13	Des Moines Buccaneers	USHL	25	3	9	12	12	—	—	—	—	—
2013–14	Des Moines Buccaneers	USHL	60	3	19	22	26	—	—	—	—	—
2014–15	Des Moines Buccaneers	USHL	45	14	25	39	12	—	—	—	—	—
2014–15	Muskegon Lumberjacks	USHL	13	2	5	7	4	12	4	8	12	8
2015–16	Western Michigan University	NCHC	35	1	12	13	12	—	—	—	—	—
2016–17	Western Michigan University	NCHC	38	5	17	22	25	—	—	—	—	—
2017–18	Western Michigan University	NCHC	34	5	21	26	18	—	—	—	—	—
2018–19	Western Michigan University	NCHC	37	3	18	21	8	—	—	—	—	—
2018–19	Stockton Heat	AHL	6	1	0	1	2	—	—	—	—	—
2019–20	Stockton Heat	AHL	44	3	18	21	29	—	—	—	—	—
2019–20	Kansas City Mavericks	ECHL	4	2	1	3	0	—	—	—	—	—
2020–21	Laval Rocket	AHL	36	3	9	12	6	—	—	—	—	—
2021–22	Laval Rocket	AHL	32	4	7	11	12	15	1	3	4	6
2021–22	Montreal Canadiens	NHL	24	2	4	6	8	—	—	—	—	—
2022–23	Laval Rocket	AHL	62	6	17	23	24	2	0	0	0	0
2022–23	Montreal Canadiens	NHL	7	0	1	1	0	—	—	—	—	—
2023–24	Colorado Eagles	AHL	64	4	18	22	24	3	0	0	0	0
2024–25	Springfield Thunderbirds	AHL	63	4	16	20	24	3	1	0	1	2
2024–25	St. Louis Blues	NHL	4	0	0	0	0	—	—	—	—	—
2025–26	Springfield Thunderbirds	AHL	9	1	5	6	2	—	—	—	—	—
2025–26	Hershey Bears	AHL	62	5	20	25	25	6	0	1	1	2
NHL totals			35	2	5	7	8	—	—	—	—	—

== Awards and honors ==
Award	Year	Ref
USHL
Third All-Star Team	2015	
