= Matej Paulovič =

Slovak professional ice hockey player (born 1995)

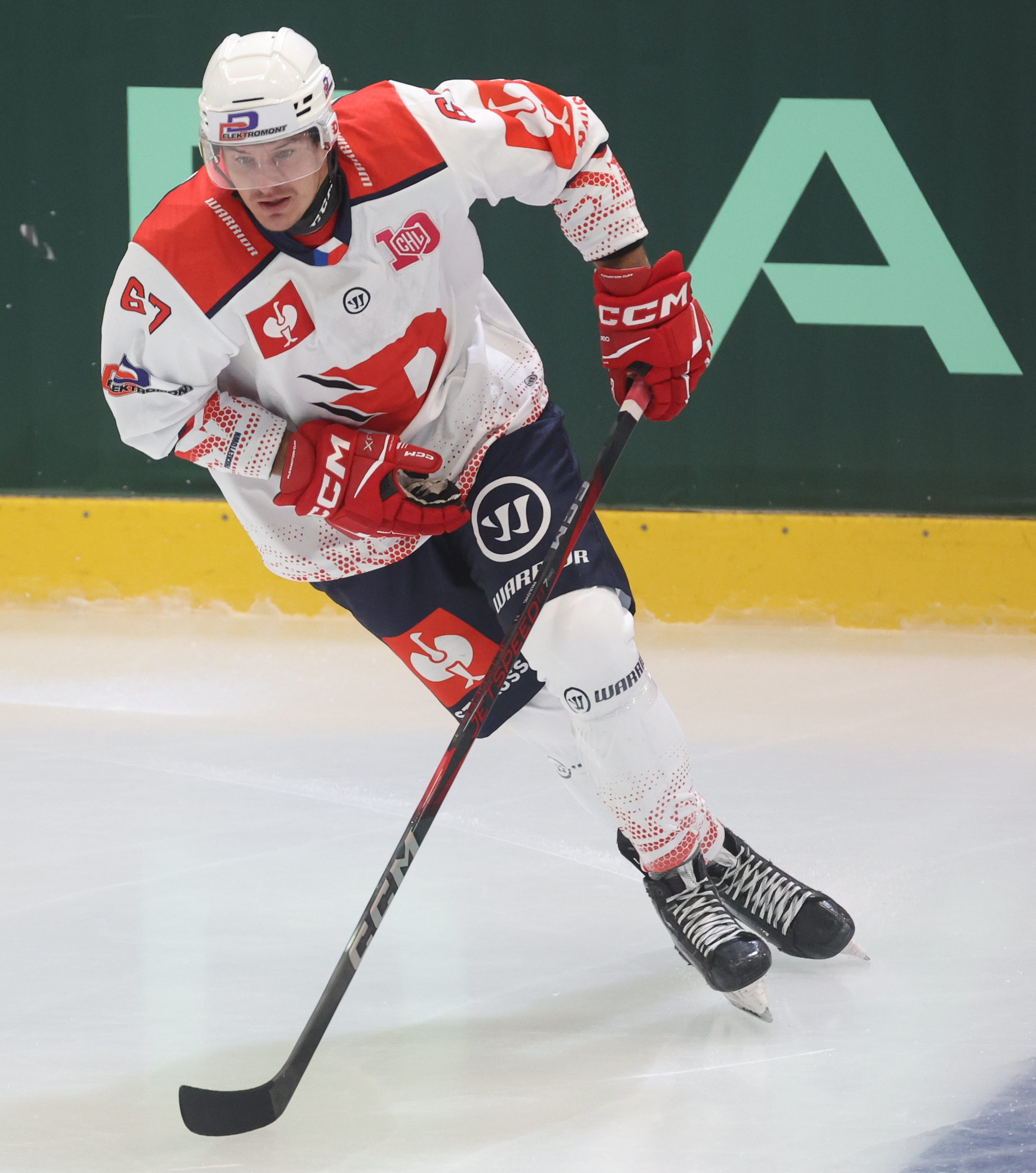
- Born: 13 January 1995 (age 31) Topoľčany, Slovakia
- Height: 6 ft 3 in (191 cm)
- Weight: 196 lb (89 kg; 14 st 0 lb)
- Position: Left wing
- Shoots: Right
- ELH team Former teams: HC Dynamo Pardubice; HC Nové Zámky; HK Nitra; Mountfield HK
- National team: Slovakia
- NHL draft: 149th overall, 2013; Dallas Stars
- Playing career: 2016–present

Matej Paulovič (born 13 January 1995) is a Slovak professional ice hockey player who is currently playing for HC Dynamo Pardubice in the Czech Extraliga (ELH). He was selected by the Dallas Stars in the fifth round, 149th overall, of the 2013 NHL entry draft.

== Playing career ==
Paulovič signed as a free agent to a three-year optional contract with Mountfield HK of the ELH, on May 23, 2018. He joined the Czech club after spending his first two professional seasons in Slovakia with HC Nové Zámky and HK Nitra of the Tipsport Liga (Slovak).

== International play ==
Paulovič competed in the 2018 Winter Olympics.

== Career statistics ==
=== Regular season and playoffs ===
			Regular season					Playoffs
Season	Team	League	GP	G	A	Pts	PIM	GP	G	A	Pts	PIM
2009–10	HC Topoľčany	SVK U18	39	17	16	33	26	—	—	—	—	—
2010–11	HC Topoľčany	SVK U18	42	33	29	62	34	—	—	—	—	—
2010–11	HK Nitra	SVK U20	2	0	0	0	0	—	—	—	—	—
2011–12	Färjestad BK	J18	17	11	17	28	12	—	—	—	—	—
2011–12	Färjestad BK	J18 Allsv	16	6	6	12	39	6	2	1	3	2
2011–12	Färjestad BK	J20	12	2	1	3	6	—	—	—	—	—
2012–13	Färjestad BK	J18	5	1	1	2	6	—	—	—	—	—
2012–13	Färjestad BK	J18 Allsv	3	2	3	5	2	—	—	—	—	—
2012–13	Färjestad BK	J20	34	5	12	17	6	7	1	1	2	6
2013–14	Peterborough Petes	OHL	18	2	2	4	4	—	—	—	—	—
2013–14	Muskegon Lumberjacks	USHL	29	6	10	16	39	—	—	—	—	—
2014–15	Muskegon Lumberjacks	USHL	51	17	33	50	79	12	3	5	8	12
2015–16	Muskegon Lumberjacks	USHL	49	20	33	53	50	—	—	—	—	—
2016–17	HC Nové Zámky	Slovak	56	12	12	24	8	5	3	0	3	2
2017–18	HK Nitra	Slovak	53	28	25	53	22	8	5	5	10	2
2018–19	Mountfield HK	ELH	43	12	10	22	22	4	0	0	0	0
2019–20	Mountfield HK	ELH	26	2	4	6	8	—	—	—	—	—
2019–20	LHK Jestřábi Prostějov	Czech.1	4	3	1	4	0	—	—	—	—	—
2019–20	HC Dynamo Pardubice	ELH	16	1	3	4	0	—	—	—	—	—
2020–21	HC Dynamo Pardubice	ELH	48	10	22	32	14	8	1	2	3	2
2020–21	HC Vrchlabí	Czech.1	3	1	2	3	0	—	—	—	—	—
2021–22	HC Dynamo Pardubice	ELH	55	8	15	23	32	8	2	1	3	14
ELH totals			188	33	54	87	76	20	3	3	6	16
Slovak totals			109	40	37	77	30	13	8	5	13	4

Medal record

Representing Slovakia

Ice hockey

World Junior Championships
Bronze medal – third place	2015 Canada	

=== International ===
Year	Team	Event	Result	GP	G	A	Pts	PIM
2011	Slovakia	U17	10th	5	0	0	0	4
2011	Slovakia	IH18	8th	4	0	2	2	4
2012	Slovakia	WJC18 D1A	11th	5	1	1	2	6
2012	Slovakia	IH18	8th	4	0	1	1	6
2015	Slovakia	WJC	3rd place, bronze medalist(s)	7	0	1	1	0
2018	Slovakia	OG	11th	3	0	0	0	0
Junior totals				20	1	5	6	16
Senior totals				3	0	0	0	0
