= Dakota Joshua =

American ice hockey player (born 1996)

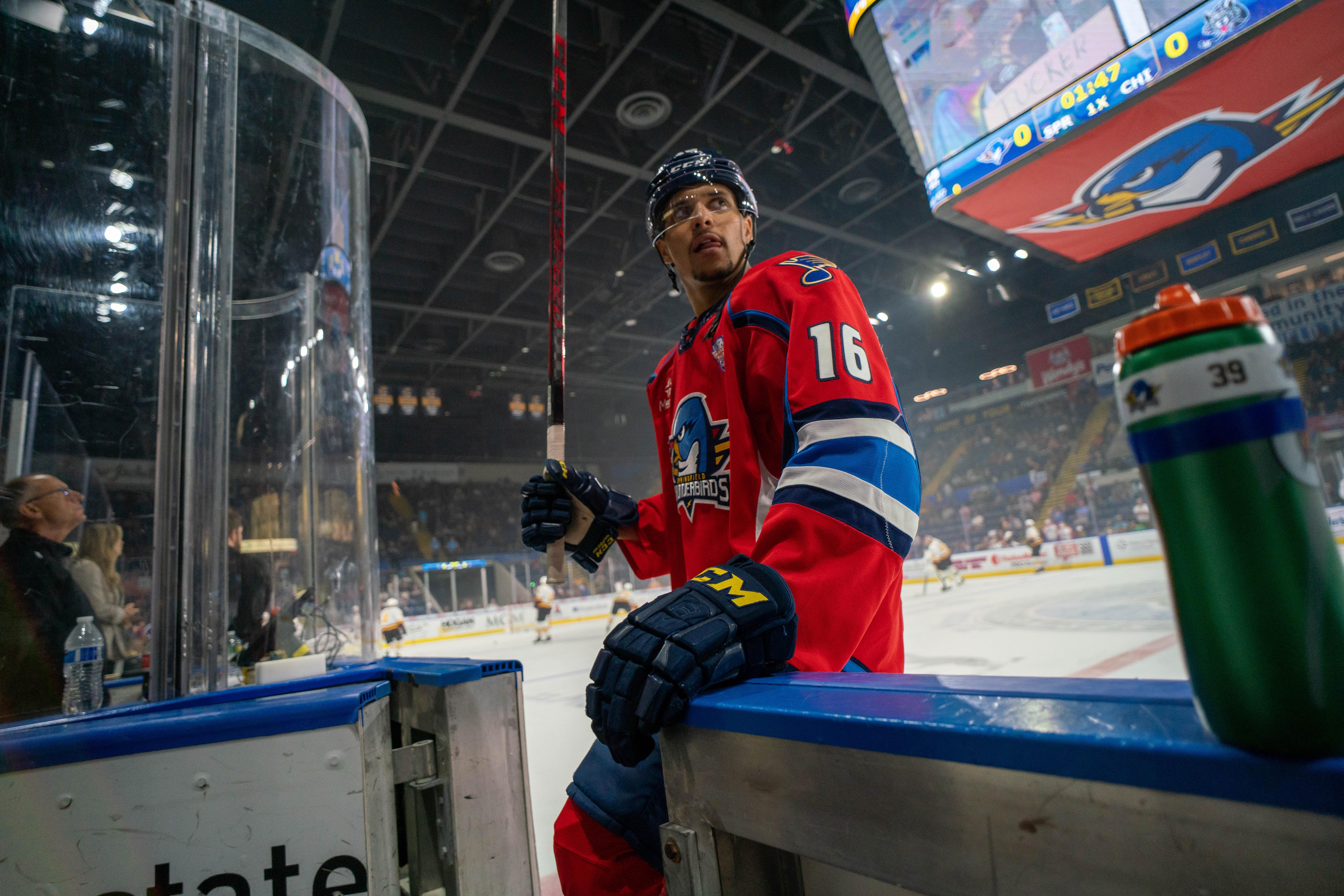
- Joshua with the Springfield Thunderbirds in 2022
- Born: May 15, 1996 (age 30) Dearborn, Michigan, U.S.
- Height: 6 ft 3 in (191 cm)
- Weight: 206 lb (93 kg; 14 st 10 lb)
- Position: Forward
- Shoots: Left
- NHL team Former teams: Toronto Maple Leafs; St. Louis Blues; Vancouver Canucks
- NHL draft: 128th overall, 2014; Toronto Maple Leafs
- Playing career: 2019–present

Dakota Joshua (born May 15, 1996) is an American professional ice hockey player who is a forward for the Toronto Maple Leafs of the National Hockey League (NHL). He was selected 128th overall by the Maple Leafs in the 2014 NHL entry draft. He previously played for the St. Louis Blues and Vancouver Canucks.

== Early life ==
Joshua was born on May 15, 1996, in Dearborn, Michigan. Growing up, his mother played ice hockey and competed in the Michigan Senior Women's Hockey League. His younger brother, Jagger, is also an ice hockey player. Growing up in Michigan, Joshua played junior ice hockey for the Honeybaked under-16 midget team and was invited to the USA Hockey select national team evaluation camp.

== Playing career ==
=== Junior ===
Following the 2011–12 season, Joshua was drafted by the Sioux Falls Stampede in the third round of the United States Hockey League (USHL) draft. After splitting the 2012–13 season between Honeybaked and the USHL, Joshua was drafted 156th overall by the Plymouth Whalers in the Ontario Hockey League (OHL) Priority Selection. Despite being drafted in the OHL, he continued to play in the USHL for the 2013–14 season.

Joshua was ranked 157th overall amongst North American skaters by the NHL Central Scouting Bureau. He was not invited to the NHL draft combine. Joshua was eventually selected in the fifth round, 128th overall, in the 2014 NHL entry draft by the Toronto Maple Leafs. He was unaware he had been drafted until he received a phone call from Toronto management while in the car. After drafting Joshua, Maple Leafs' amateur scouting director Dave Morrison spoke highly of him as a player, saying: "He's tall, very athletic, and we saw some flashes of real good skill towards the end of the year. His coaches couldn't say enough good things about him. He's very diligent in two ways of the game, and a top nine potential player."

Joshua spent two full seasons with the Stampede, during which he helped them win the 2015 Clark Cup championship.

=== Collegiate ===
In his freshman season at the Ohio State University, Joshua recorded 17 points in 29 games for the Buckeyes. He recorded his first collegiate goal, which turned out to be the game-winner, during a shootout against the University of Michigan on January 15, 2016. However, four days later, he received a game suspension due to his actions during the contest against Michigan on October 17. He helped the Buckeyes qualify for the 2016 Big Ten tournament but lost to the top-seeded University of Minnesota in the semifinals. The following season, Joshua recorded 12 goals and 23 assists, earning Honorable Mention All-Big Ten accolades in March 2017. As well, off the ice, he was selected for the Ohio State Scholar–Athlete while majoring in the sports industry and selected for the Academic All-Big Ten team.

=== Professional ===
On July 12, 2019, Joshua's rights were traded to the St. Louis Blues in exchange for future considerations. Joshua made his NHL debut on March 1, 2021, in a 5–4 win over the Anaheim Ducks, and scored a goal. After scoring in his debut, Joshua said: "It was all I expected and then some. Playing in the National Hockey League is the biggest honor you can have in the sport of hockey. So, it was an unreal experience to be a part of the club today." He was reassigned to the taxi squad shortly after but called up again on March 5.

As a free agent from the Blues, Joshua signed a two-year, $1.65 million contract with the Vancouver Canucks on July 13, 2022. On February 13, 2024, in a 4–2 win over the Chicago Blackhawks, he achieved a Gordie Howe hat trick with an assist on each of Conor Garland's two goals, followed by a goal and a fight against MacKenzie Entwistle in the third period.

On June 27, 2024, after setting career-highs in goals and assists with the Canucks, Joshua signed a four-year, $13 million contract extension to remain with the team. In the summer of 2024, Joshua was diagnosed with testicular cancer, which required surgery and made him miss the training camp for the 2024–25 season. He returned to play on November 14, in a 5–2 loss against the New York Islanders.

On July 17, 2025, Joshua was traded by the Canucks to the Toronto Maple Leafs in exchange for a 2028 fourth-round draft pick.

== Career statistics ==
			Regular season					Playoffs
Season	Team	League	GP	G	A	Pts	PIM	GP	G	A	Pts	PIM
2012–13	U.S. National Development Team	USHL	6	2	0	2	2	—	—	—	—	—
2012–13	Sioux Falls Stampede	USHL	1	0	1	1	0	—	—	—	—	—
2013–14	Sioux Falls Stampede	USHL	55	17	21	38	58	3	0	0	0	8
2014–15	Sioux Falls Stampede	USHL	52	20	24	44	74	11	4	9	13	38
2015–16	Ohio State University	B1G	29	5	12	17	50	—	—	—	—	—
2016–17	Ohio State University	B1G	33	12	23	35	58	—	—	—	—	—
2017–18	Ohio State University	B1G	34	15	11	26	32	—	—	—	—	—
2018–19	Ohio State University	B1G	32	9	13	22	67	—	—	—	—	—
2019–20	San Antonio Rampage	AHL	30	3	4	7	25	—	—	—	—	—
2019–20	Tulsa Oilers	ECHL	20	3	8	11	4	—	—	—	—	—
2020–21	Utica Comets	AHL	6	2	1	3	2	—	—	—	—	—
2020–21	St. Louis Blues	NHL	12	1	0	1	7	—	—	—	—	—
2021–22	Springfield Thunderbirds	AHL	35	9	11	20	23	18	7	8	15	58
2021–22	St. Louis Blues	NHL	30	3	5	8	16	1	0	0	0	0
2022–23	Vancouver Canucks	NHL	79	11	12	23	60	—	—	—	—	—
2023–24	Vancouver Canucks	NHL	63	18	14	32	60	13	4	4	8	10
2024–25	Vancouver Canucks	NHL	57	7	7	14	38	—	—	—	—	—
2025–26	Toronto Maple Leafs	NHL	55	10	8	18	49	—	—	—	—	—
NHL totals			296	50	46	96	230	14	4	4	8	10

== Awards and honors ==
Award	Year	Ref
USHL
Clark Cup champion	2015	
College
B1G Honorable Mention All-Star Team	2017	
Vancouver Canucks
Fred J. Hume Award	2023, 2024	
