= Griffen Molino =

American professional ice hockey forward (born 1994)

- Born: January 21, 1994 (age 32) Trenton, Michigan, U.S.
- Height: 5 ft 11 in (180 cm)
- Weight: 171 lb (78 kg; 12 st 3 lb)
- Position: Center
- Shot: Left
- Played for: Vancouver Canucks
- NHL draft: Undrafted
- Playing career: 2017–2022

Griffen Molino (born January 21, 1994) is an American former professional ice hockey forward. He most recently played with the Utah Grizzlies in the ECHL. He has previously played in the National Hockey League with the Vancouver Canucks.

== Playing career ==
Molino first played minor hockey in the Little Caesars hockey program in Michigan. As a youth, he played in the 2006 and 2007, Quebec International Pee-Wee Hockey Tournaments with the Little Caesers minor ice hockey team. He enjoyed stints with the Brockville Braves in the Central Canada Hockey League, the Sioux Falls Stampede and Muskegon Lumberjacks of the United States Hockey League before committing to a collegiate career with Western Michigan University.

Molino played for the Western Michigan Broncos from 2015 to 2017.

After his sophomore season with the Broncos in 2016–17, Molino ended his collegiate career by signing as an undrafted free agent with the Vancouver Canucks to a two-year entry-level contract on March 28, 2017. He immediately joined the Canucks playing roster, and made his professional and NHL debut three days later in a 2–0 defeat to the Los Angeles Kings.

In his first full professional season in the 2017–18 season, Molino was assigned to the Canucks AHL affiliate, the Utica Comets. Molino suffered through injury and a lack of form, resulting in an unimpressive rookie campaign with 3 goals and 10 points in 46 games. In the off-season, Molino was not tendered a qualifying offer by the Canucks and was free to pursue free agency on June 25, 2018.

Unable to secure another NHL offer, Molino agreed to a one-year AHL contract with reigning champions, the Toronto Marlies, on July 5, 2018. In the 2018–19 season, Molino was unable to establish himself within the Marlies, appearing in 36 games producing 4 points. He was reassigned through the season to play in the ECHL with an affiliate, the Newfoundland Growlers, registering 6 points in 10 games.

As a free agent from the Marlies, Molino opted to continue his career in the ECHL, agreeing to a contract with the Utah Grizzlies on August 5, 2019.

== Career statistics ==
			Regular season					Playoffs
Season	Team	League	GP	G	A	Pts	PIM	GP	G	A	Pts	PIM
2012–13	Brockville Braves	CCHL	61	14	20	34	38	6	2	1	3	2
2013–14	Sioux Falls Stampede	USHL	59	8	31	39	31	2	0	0	0	2
2014–15	Muskegon Lumberjacks	USHL	57	18	46	64	39	12	3	6	9	10
2015–16	Western Michigan University	NCHC	36	11	14	25	12	—	—	—	—	—
2016–17	Western Michigan University	NCHC	40	15	18	33	29	—	—	—	—	—
2016–17	Vancouver Canucks	NHL	5	0	0	0	0	—	—	—	—	—
2017–18	Utica Comets	AHL	46	3	7	10	19	—	—	—	—	—
2018–19	Toronto Marlies	AHL	36	1	3	4	12	1	0	0	0	0
2018–19	Newfoundland Growlers	ECHL	10	3	3	6	2	—	—	—	—	—
2019–20	Utah Grizzlies	ECHL	50	22	37	59	23	—	—	—	—	—
2019–20	Colorado Eagles	AHL	9	1	2	3	4	—	—	—	—	—
2019–20	Ontario Reign	AHL	2	0	1	1	0	—	—	—	—	—
2022	Team Murphy	3ICE	17	4	8	12	—	—	—	—	—	—
NHL totals			5	0	0	0	0	—	—	—	—	—
