= Adam Johnson (ice hockey) =

American ice hockey player (1994–2023)

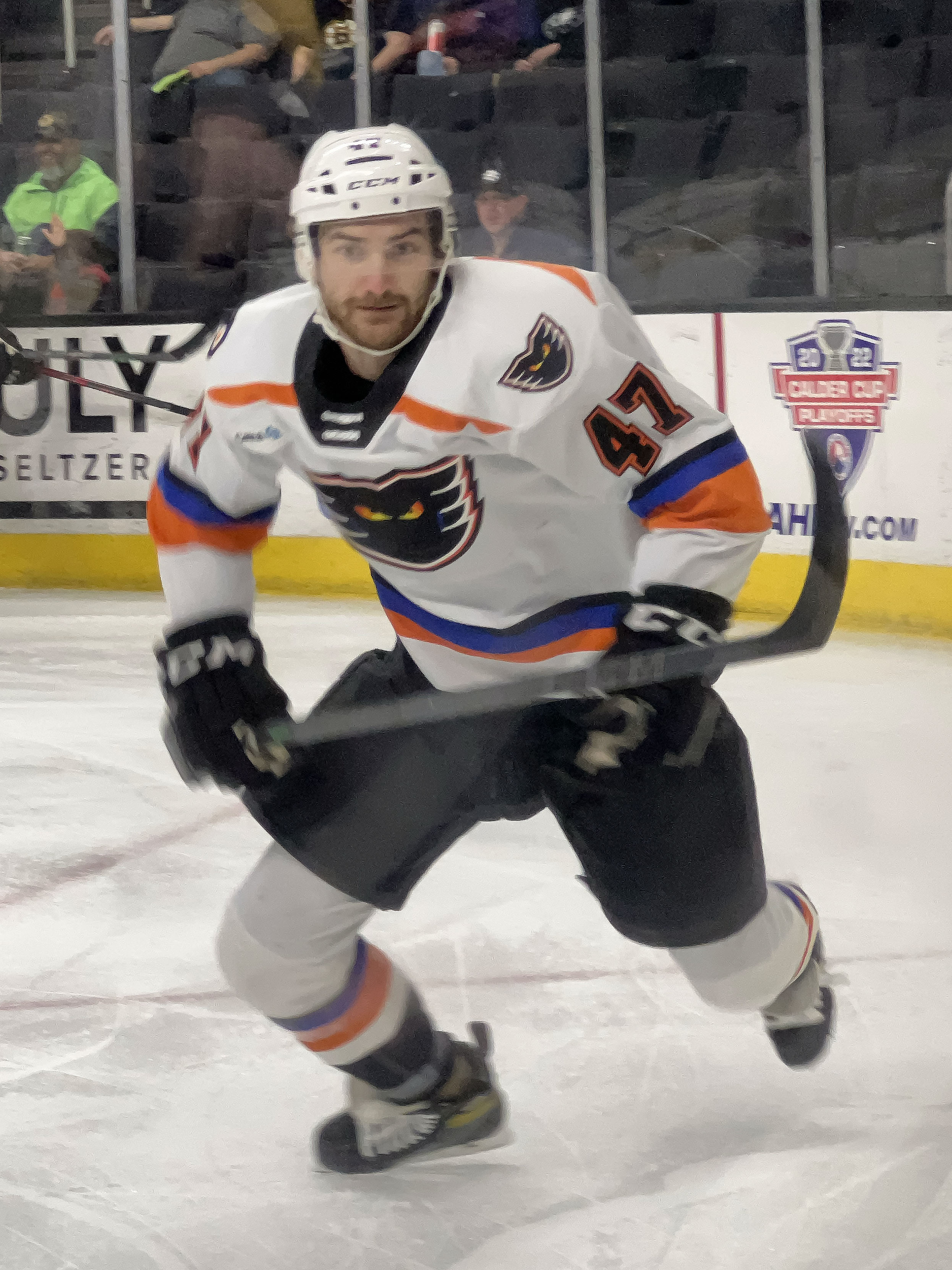
- Johnson with the Lehigh Valley Phantoms in 2022
- Born: June 22, 1994 Grand Rapids, Minnesota, U.S.
- Died: October 28, 2023 (aged 29) Sheffield, England
- Height: 6 ft 0 in (183 cm)
- Weight: 174 lb (79 kg; 12 st 6 lb)
- Position: Center
- Shot: Left
- Played for: Pittsburgh Penguins; Malmö Redhawks; Augsburger Panther; Nottingham Panthers
- NHL draft: Undrafted
- Playing career: 2017–2023

Adam Robert Johnson (June 22, 1994 – October 28, 2023) was an American professional ice hockey forward. He played 13 games in the National Hockey League with the Pittsburgh Penguins during the 2018–19 and 2019–20 seasons. He also played in Europe with the Malmö Redhawks, Augsburger Panther, and Nottingham Panthers. Johnson died after an on-ice collision resulted in a cut to his neck from the blade of another player's skate.

== Early life and education ==
Johnson was born on June 22, 1994, in Grand Rapids, Minnesota, to Susan and Davey Johnson. Davey Johnson played four seasons of collegiate ice hockey for the University of Minnesota Duluth's men's ice hockey team. Adam's uncle and Davey's brother-in-law, Gary DeGrio, also played collegiately for Minnesota Duluth, as teammates with Davey, and then professionally for the Tulsa Oilers, Salt Lake Golden Eagles, and Dundee Tigers.

After graduating from Hibbing High School, Johnson played junior ice hockey in the United States Hockey League (USHL) with the Indiana Ice and Sioux City Musketeers, and was named a USHL All-Star in 2015. Undrafted in the National Hockey League (NHL), he followed in his father's and uncle's footsteps, playing two seasons of collegiate ice hockey with Minnesota Duluth's team in the National Collegiate Hockey Conference (NCHC). During his sophomore season, 2016–17, Johnson scored 18 goals and tallied 37 points in 42 games, finishing second on the club in both goals and points. He helped Minnesota-Duluth advance to the 2017 Frozen Four with a power-play goal to defeat Boston University, 3–2 in overtime. The Bulldogs eventually fell to the University of Denver 3–2 in the title game.

== Playing career ==
In July 2017, Johnson signed a two-year, entry-level contract with the Pittsburgh Penguins after attending the team's prospect camp. He was the second-leading scorer for Pittsburgh's American Hockey League (AHL) affiliate, Wilkes-Barre/Scranton Penguins during the 2017–18 season and made his NHL debut with Pittsburgh on March 21, 2019, in a 2–1 win over the Nashville Predators. He played a total of 13 NHL games, and scored one goal in a 7–4 win against the Minnesota Wild on October 12.

With the COVID-19 pandemic delaying the North American season, Johnson joined the Malmö Redhawks of the Swedish Hockey League (SHL) for the 2020–21 season on December 15, 2020. Appearing with the Redhawks in a top-six forward role, he added seven goals and 12 points through 21 regular season games before ending his contract and return to North America on March 27, 2021.

On April 6, 2021, Johnson signed with the Ontario Reign of the AHL, the primary affiliate of the Los Angeles Kings, for the remainder of the 2020–21 season. He posted 11 points in 14 games for the Reign. Remaining with the Reign into the 2021–22 season, he registered one goal and six points through 28 regular season games before being traded on February 17, 2022, to the Lehigh Valley Phantoms in exchange for future considerations.

Johnson returned to Europe in the 2022 off-season, signing a one-year deal with the Augsburger Panther of the German Deutsche Eishockey Liga (DEL), on September 12, 2022. In the 2022–23 season, he posted seven goals and 22 points through 45 regular season games. The Panthers finished the season in the relegation zone and Johnson left the club after his contract expired on March 17, 2023.

In the summer of 2023, Johnson debated between retiring from hockey to pursue a more traditional career or continue his playing career in Europe. Ultimately, in August 2023, he opted to play hockey and signed with the Nottingham Panthers of the Elite Ice Hockey League (EIHL) for the 2023–24 season.

== Death ==
On October 28, 2023, before 8,000 spectators at Utilita Arena during a game against the Sheffield Steelers, Johnson's throat was cut by the skate of Steelers player Matt Petgrave during an on-ice collision at the 35th minute of the game. A video of the incident showed Petgrave's left skate kick up towards Johnson as he began to fall after colliding with another Panthers player. After the impact, Johnson attempted to skate to the team bench while bleeding heavily but collapsed on the ice. As paramedics tended to his injury, other players locked arms to form a protective ring around him. Later, protective sheets were raised and players returned to the locker rooms. The game was abandoned and spectators were asked to leave the arena. He was transferred to Sheffield's Northern General Hospital, where he was pronounced dead. News of his death was withheld until the following morning while his relatives were alerted.

In response to Johnson's death, the EIHL suspended all games scheduled for October 29. Leagues and teams worldwide issued statements mourning his death and held pre-game ceremonies in his honor. A fan fundraising campaign to support Johnson's family surpassed its initial goal of £5,000 within a few hours, and its adjusted goal of £10,000 the same day. Following Johnson's death, hundreds of fans assembled outside Nottingham Arena, the home rink of the Panthers, alongside Panthers players and staff to lay flowers and other tributes in a makeshift memorial. Moments of silence were also held across the NHL.

Westin Michaud, Johnson's teammate, said that Petgrave's actions "were unintentional and anyone suggesting otherwise is mistaken". In a statement on Twitter, the Nottingham Panthers said that his death was the result of a "freak accident".

South Yorkshire Police opened an investigation into the death. In England, an act that intends to cause grievous bodily harm to a person but results in their death can constitute murder; in such a case, a lesser constructive manslaughter charge is also available to prosecutors. An autopsy report confirmed that Johnson died from the wound to his neck. On November 14, 17 days after the incident, South Yorkshire Police announced the arrest of an unnamed man, later revealed to be Petgrave, on suspicion of manslaughter in Johnson's death. He was later released on police bail. Petgrave was re-bailed several times over the next year due to the investigation. On April 29, 2025, the Crown Prosecution Service announced that there was no reasonable chance of a conviction, and closed the case without bringing charges.

In September 2024, Nottingham Panthers announced that the club would officially retire Johnson's number 47 jersey in a ceremony before their home Elite League game against the Fife Flyers on December 14 that year. His jersey was the seventh to be retired by the Panthers.

== Legacy, aftermath, and push for extra protection ==
Johnson's death prompted an examination of player safety in the game of hockey and led to several mandates on neck protection. The English Ice Hockey Association (EIHA), the governing body of the sport in England and Wales at all levels below the Elite League, introduced a neck guard mandate beginning in 2024. All Canadian Hockey League leagues (OHL, QMJHL, and WHL) also mandated neck guards, effective November 4, 2023. However, the Elite Ice Hockey League, in which Johnson had been playing at the time of his death, announced that it had no plans to mandate neck guards. Though not required in the league, several NHL players began wearing neck guards in games and practices following Johnson's death, including Anze Kopitar, Tyler Bertuzzi, T. J. Oshie, and Cole Koepke. USA Hockey approved a new policy, effective August 1, 2024, requiring all players and on-ice officials 18 years of age and under to wear neck-laceration protection in games and practices. Beginning in the 2024-25 season, the AHL required that all players and on-ice officials wear cut-resistant neck protectors. In the 2026–27 NHL season, new players will be required to wear neck guards. The 2026 Winter Olympics saw a mandatory neck guard rule for Ice Hockey events introduced for the first time, with previous editions allowing their use to be optional.

== Personal life ==
According to family members, at the time of his death, Johnson had purchased an engagement ring he planned to give to his girlfriend of three years, Ryan Wolfe.

== Career statistics ==
=== Regular season and playoffs ===
			Regular season					Playoffs
Season	Team	League	GP	G	A	Pts	PIM	GP	G	A	Pts	PIM
2009–10	Hibbing High School	HS-MN	24	8	15	23	8	—	—	—	—	—
2010–11	Hibbing High School	HS-MN	25	34	36	70	8	3	4	6	10	0
2011–12	Hibbing High School	HS-MN	20	24	28	52	14	3	4	3	7	6
2012–13	Hibbing High School	HS-MN	24	16	27	43	70	2	4	0	4	0
2012–13	Indiana Ice	USHL	6	0	2	2	0	—	—	—	—	—
2013–14	Sioux City Musketeers	USHL	56	15	31	46	25	8	4	3	7	6
2014–15	Sioux City Musketeers	USHL	59	31	40	71	24	5	1	2	3	2
2015–16	University of Minnesota-Duluth	NCHC	39	6	12	18	8	—	—	—	—	—
2016–17	University of Minnesota-Duluth	NCHC	42	18	19	37	18	—	—	—	—	—
2017–18	Wilkes-Barre/Scranton Penguins	AHL	70	11	20	31	16	3	1	0	1	0
2018–19	Pittsburgh Penguins	NHL	6	0	2	2	0	—	—	—	—	—
2018–19	Wilkes-Barre/Scranton Penguins	AHL	67	18	25	43	27	—	—	—	—	—
2019–20	Pittsburgh Penguins	NHL	7	1	1	2	2	—	—	—	—	—
2019–20	Wilkes-Barre/Scranton Penguins	AHL	48	10	24	34	12	—	—	—	—	—
2020–21	Malmö Redhawks	SHL	21	7	5	12	8	—	—	—	—	—
2020–21	Ontario Reign	AHL	14	6	5	11	6	1	0	1	1	0
2021–22	Ontario Reign	AHL	28	1	5	6	18	—	—	—	—	—
2021–22	Lehigh Valley Phantoms	AHL	30	4	8	12	12	—	—	—	—	—
2022–23	Augsburger Panther	DEL	45	7	15	22	10	—	—	—	—	—
2023–24	Nottingham Panthers	EIHL	7	4	3	7	0	—	—	—	—	—
NHL totals			13	1	3	4	2	—	—	—	—	—
Source: Eliteprospects

== Awards and honors ==
Award	Year	Ref
USHL
First All-Star Team	2015	

The Nottingham Panthers retired Johnson's number 47 jersey number at a ceremony on November 18, 2023. Hibbing High School retired his high school number 7 on December 5, 2023.

On February 2, 2024, a plaque in Johnson's memory was unveiled at the Motorpoint Arena where Nottingham Panthers play their home games. It includes the tribute "Forever our 47".

== See also ==
- Clint Malarchuk
- Richard Zedník
- List of ice hockey players who died during their careers
- List of unusual deaths in the 21st century
