= 2014–15 USHL season =

2014–15 USHL Season
- League: United States Hockey League
- Sport: Ice hockey
- Duration: September 26, 2014 – April 11, 2015
- Games: 60
- Teams: 17

Draft
- Top draft pick: Kyle Sylvester
- Picked by: Fargo Force

Regular season
- Anderson Cup: Youngstown Phantoms
- Season MVP: Kyle Connor (Youngstown Phantoms)
- Top scorer: Kyle Connor (Youngstown Phantoms)

Clark Cup Playoffs
- Clark Cup Playoffs MVP: Troy Loggins (Stampede)
- Finals champions: Sioux Falls Stampede
- Runners-up: Muskegon Lumberjacks

USHL seasons
- 2013–14 2015–16

The 2014–15 USHL season is the 36th season of the United States Hockey League as an all-junior league. The regular season ran from September 26, 2014, to April 11, 2015. The regular season champion Youngstown Phantoms were awarded the Anderson Cup. The playoff champion Sioux Falls Stampede captured the Clark Cup.

== Regular season ==
Note: GP = Games played; W = Wins; L = Losses; OTL = Overtime losses; PTS = Points; GF = Goals for; GA = Goals against; PIM = Penalties in Minutes
x = clinched playoff berth; y = clinched conference title; z = clinched regular season title

=== Eastern Conference ===
Team	GP	W	L	OTL	PTS	GF	GA	PIM
zYoungstown Phantoms	60	40	14	6	86	233	166	1178
xCedar Rapids RoughRiders	60	39	21	0	78	210	162	687
xDubuque Fighting Saints	60	36	19	5	77	207	167	1327
xMuskegon Lumberjacks	60	35	21	4	74	184	179	1107
Bloomington Thunder	60	29	24	7	65	173	187	1108
Chicago Steel	60	30	27	3	63	199	209	977
Madison Capitols	60	24	25	11	59	172	212	1193
Team USA	60	25	32	3	53	208	209	1120
Green Bay Gamblers	60	18	34	8	44	156	213	1010

=== Western Conference ===
Team	GP	W	L	OTL	PTS	GF	GA	PIM
ySioux City Musketeers	60	38	17	5	81	225	170	1129
xTri-City Storm	60	37	17	6	80	202	158	1017
xOmaha Lancers	60	34	17	9	77	195	176	1258
xSioux Falls Stampede	60	32	23	5	69	191	181	1110
Waterloo Black Hawks	60	28	26	6	62	191	182	889
Fargo Force	60	26	28	6	58	148	191	933
Des Moines Buccaneers	60	21	26	13	55	164	204	1050
Lincoln Stars	60	18	37	5	41	150	242	1183

== Statistical leaders ==
=== Scoring leaders ===
Players are listed by points, then goals.

Note: GP = Games played; G = Goals; A = Assists; Pts. = Points; PIM = Penalty minutes

Player	Team	GP	G	A	Pts	PIM
Kyle Connor	Youngstown Phantoms	56	34	46	80	6
Adam Johnson	Sioux City Musketeers	59	31	40	71	24
Brock Boeser	Waterloo Black Hawks	57	35	33	68	30
Joe Snively	Sioux City Musketeers	55	27	37	64	26
Maxim Letunov	Youngstown Phantoms	58	25	39	64	18
Griffen Molino	Muskegon Lumberjacks	57	18	46	64	39
Robert Carpenter	Sioux City Musketeers	60	35	28	63	30
Josh Melnick	Youngstown Phantoms	60	14	48	62	32
Mason Bergh	Chicago Steel	54	21	40	61	64
Fredrik Olofsson	Chicago Steel	57	27	33	60	14

=== Leading goaltenders ===
These are the goaltenders that lead the league in GAA that have played at least 1380 minutes.

Note: GP = Games played; Mins = Minutes played; W = Wins; L = Losses; OTL = Overtime losses; SOL = Shootout losses; SO = Shutouts; GAA = Goals against average; SV% = Save percentage

Player	Team	GP	Mins	W	L	OTL	SOL	SO	GAA	SV%
Alec Dillon	Tri-City Storm	41	2302	23	11	1	3	3	2.27	0.914
Jacob Nehama	Dubuque Fighting Saints	48	2802	29	13	1	3	2	2.31	0.913
Cale Morris	Chicago/Waterloo	46	2664	27	15	2	0	4	2.41	0.920
Ryan Larkin	Cedar Rapids RoughRiders	28	1553	13	10	0	0	3	2.43	0.919
Chris Birdsall	Youngstown Phantoms	32	1852	17	7	2	3	3	2.46	0.914

== Post Season Awards ==
=== All-USHL First Team ===
Pos	Name	Team	Notes
G	Erik Schierhorn	Muskegon	Goaltender of the Year
D	Neal Pionk	Sioux City	Defenseman of the Year
D	Hayden Shaw	Dubuque	
F	Brock Boeser	Waterloo	All Rookie Team
F	Kyle Connor	Youngstown	Player of the Year; Forward of the Year
F	Adam Johnson	Sioux City	

=== All-USHL Second Team ===
Pos	Name	Team
G	Alec Dillon	Tri-City
D	Bobby Nardella	Tri-City
D	Christian Wolanin	Muskegon
F	Maxim Letunov	Youngstown
F	Seamus Malone	Dubuque
F	Chris Wilkie	Tri-City

=== All-USHL Third Team ===
Pos	Name	Team
G	Cale Morris	Waterloo
D	Corey Schueneman	Muskegon
D	Jimmy Schuldt	Omaha
F	Kieffer Bellows	Sioux Falls
F	Mason Bergh	Chicago
F	Jakob Forsbacka Karlsson	Omaha
F	Auston Matthews	Team USA

=== All Rookie First Team ===
Pos	Name	Team
G	Alec Dillon	Tri-City
D	Dennis Gilbert	Chicago
D	Ryan Zuhlsdorf	Sioux City
F	Kieffer Bellows	Sioux Falls
F	Brock Boeser	Waterloo
F	Erik Foley	Cedar Rapids

=== All Rookie Second Team ===
Pos	Name	Team
G	Ben Blacker	Cedar Rapids
D	Chad Krys	Team USA
D	Mitch Reinke	Cedar Rapids
D	Vili Saarijärvi	Green Bay
F	Robert Carpenter	Sioux City
F	Tanner Laczynski	Chicago
F	Tommy Novak	Waterloo

== Clark Cup Playoffs ==
Conference Semi-Finals (Best of 5)
1	Youngstown	1
4	Muskegon	3
Eastern Conference
3	Dubuque	3
2	Cedar Rapids	0
2	Tri-City	3
3	Omaha	0
Western Conference
4	Sioux Falls	3
1	Sioux City	2

Conference Finals (Best of 5)
4	Muskegon	3
3	Dubuque	2
2	Tri-City	1
4	Sioux Falls	3

Clark Cup Championship (Best of 5)
E4	Muskegon	0
W4	Sioux Falls	3

== Conference Semi-Finals ==
=== Eastern Conference ===
==== (1) Youngstown Phantoms vs. (4) Muskegon Lumberjacks ====
April 15	Muskegon Lumberjacks	5 – 4	OT	Youngstown Phantoms	L.C. Walker Arena
Mark Petaccio (1) - 2:14; Griffen Molino (1) - pp - 18:01		First period		0:28 - Kyle Connor (1); 19:31 - sh - Josh Melnick (1)
Christian Wolanin (1) - 6:50; Adrian Sloboda (1) - 8:48		Second period		11:15 - sh - Ryan Lomberg (1); 15:12 - Vasili Kolias (1)
No scoring		Third period		No scoring
4:38 - Matt Iacopelli (1)		First overtime period		No scoring
Eric Schierhorn (34 saves / 38 shots)		Goalie stats		Chris Birdsall (36 saves / 41 shots)

April 17	Youngstown Phantoms	4 – 2	Muskegon Lumberjacks	Covelli Centre
10:59 - Josh Nenadal (1)		First period	Matt Iacopelli (2) - 3:42
0:56 - pp - Kyle Connor (2); 3:35 - Josh Nenadal (2)		Second period	Matt Iacopelli (3) - 4:29
19:13 - pp - en - Kyle Connor (3)		Third period	No scoring
Colin DeAugustine (28 saves / 30 shots)		Goalie stats	Eric Schierhorn (25 saves / 28 shots)

April 18	Youngstown Phantoms	1 – 2	2OT	Muskegon Lumberjacks	Covelli Centre
No scoring		First period		No scoring
No scoring		Second period		No scoring
Vasili Kolias (2) - 0:32		Third period		12:04 - Matt Iacopelli (4)
No scoring		Second overtime period		14:46 - Will Graber (1)
Colin DeAugustine (45 saves / 47 shots)		Goalie stats		Eric Schierhorn (44 saves / 45 shots)

April 20	Muskegon Lumberjacks	4 – 2	Youngstown Phantoms	L.C. Walker Arena
11:35 - Christian Wolanin (2)		First period	Kiefer Sherwood (1) - 1:35
11:52 - Christian Wolanin (3); 16:14 - Corey Schueneman (1)		Second period	Taylor Best (1) - 13:15
19:54 - en - Griffen Molino (2)		Third period	No scoring
Eric Schierhorn (26 saves / 28 shots)		Goalie stats	Chris Birdsall (39 saves / 42 shots)

Muskegon wins series 3 – 1

==== (2) Cedar Rapids RoughRiders vs. (3) Dubuque Fighting Saints ====
April 14	Dubuque Fighting Saints	6 – 3	Cedar Rapids RoughRiders	Mystique Ice Center
William Lagesson (1) - 16:49; Jacob Benson (1) - 19:50		First period	14:19 - Andrew Gaus (1)
Dylan Gambrell (1) - sh - 14:18; Willie Knierim (1) - 16:40; Hayden Shaw (1) - 18:44		Second period	17:23 - Jiří Fronk (1)
Brett Boeing (1) - 16:34		Third period	16:52 - Erik Foley (1)
Jacob Nehama (28 saves / 31 shots)		Goalie stats	Ryan Larkin (30 saves / 36 shots)

April 17	Cedar Rapids RoughRiders	1 – 5	Dubuque Fighting Saints	Cedar Rapids Ice Arena
No scoring		First period	Seamus Malone (1) - pp - 12:42
No scoring		Second period	Gordie Green (1) - 4:45; Willie Knierim (2) - 6:53; Mitchell Smith (1) - 16:04
8:07 - sh - Andrew Gaus (2)		Third period	Nate Sucese (1) - en - 18:44
Ben Blacker (9 saves / 12 shots); Ryan Larkin (14 saves / 15 shots)		Goalie stats	Jacob Nehama (32 saves / 33 shots)

April 18	Cedar Rapids RoughRiders	1 – 2	Dubuque Fighting Saints	Cedar Rapids Ice Arena
No scoring		First period	No scoring
No scoring		Second period	4:42 - Trey Dodd (1)
Joe Wegwerth (1) - 6:48		Third period	1:23 - Evan Smith (1)
Ben Blacker (27 saves / 29 shots)		Goalie stats	Jacob Nehama (30 saves / 31 shots)

Dubuque wins series 3 – 0

=== Western Conference ===
==== (1) Sioux City Musketeers vs. (4) Sioux Falls Stampede ====
April 14	Sioux Falls Stampede	5 – 1	Sioux City Musketeers	Denny Sanford Premier Center
Logan O'Connor (1) - 0:57		First period	No scoring
Kieffer Bellows (1) - 6:29; Logan O'Connor (2) - 10:40		Second period	4:39 - sh - Joe Snively (1)
Troy Loggins (1) - en - 19:09; Daniel Warpecha (1) - 19:36		Third period	No scoring
Stefanos Lekkas (36 saves / 37 shots)		Goalie stats	Collin Olson (35 saves / 39 shots)

April 16	Sioux City Musketeers	4 – 2	Sioux Falls Stampede	Tyson Events Center
18:16 - David Trinkberger (1)		First period	No scoring
No scoring		Second period	Troy Loggins (2) - 0:36; Troy Loggins (3) - 7:20
4:44 - Ryan Walker (1); 7:33 - Joel Janatuinen (1); 19:25 - en - Bobo Carpenter (1)		Third period	No scoring
Collin Olson (31 saves / 33 shots)		Goalie stats	Stefanos Lekkas (27 saves / 30 shots)

April 17	Sioux City Musketeers	1 – 4	Sioux Falls Stampede	Tyson Events Center
No scoring		First period	5:17 - Mikey Eyssimont (1); 6:29 - Chaz Switzer (1); 17:07 - Dakota Joshua (1)
No scoring		Second period	8:27 - Mikey Eyssimont (2)
Joel Janatuinen (2) - pp - 0:20		Third period	No scoring
Collin Olson (16 saves / 20 shots); Cameron Gornet (17 saves / 17 shots)		Goalie stats	Stefanos Lekkas (33 saves / 34 shots)

April 19	Sioux Falls Stampede	1 – 2	Sioux City Musketeers	Denny Sanford Premier Center
No scoring		First period	Ryan Walker (2) - 8:09
15:33 - pp - Kieffer Bellows (2)		Second period	No scoring
No scoring		Third period	Joel Janatuinen (3) - 13:37
Stefanos Lekkas (22 saves / 24 shots)		Goalie stats	Collin Olson (38 saves / 39 shots)

April 21	Sioux City Musketeers	1 – 6	Sioux Falls Stampede	Tyson Events Center
No scoring		First period	Parker Tuomie (1) - 11:48
12:52 - pp - Adam Johnson (1)		Second period	Troy Loggins (4) - 0:49; Dakota Joshua (2) - pp - 10:00; Cooper Marody (1) - 16:11; Logan O'Connor (3) - 19:37
No scoring		Third period	Mikey Eyssimont (3) - 13:20
Collin Olson (33 saves / 38 shots); Cameron Gornet (15 saves / 16 shots)		Goalie stats	Stefanos Lekkas (21 saves / 22 shots)

Sioux Falls wins series 3 – 2

==== (2) Tri-City Storm vs. (3) Omaha Lancers ====
April 14	Omaha Lancers	1 – 2	Tri-City Storm	Ralston Arena
No scoring		First period	6:49 - Conner Valesano (1)
Anthony Angello (1) - 15:00		Second period	5:59 - Conner Valesano (2)
No scoring		Third period	No scoring
Kris Oldham (21 saves / 23 shots)		Goalie stats	Alec Dillon (25 saves / 26 shots)

April 16	Tri-City Storm	3 – 2	Omaha Lancers	Viaero Center
No scoring		First period	Jimmy Schuldt (1) - pp - 7:54
No scoring		Second period	Ryan Donato (1) - pp - 4:22
4:30 - Kevin Kerr (1); 16:46 - Mason Appleton (1); 18:55 - Daniel Labosky (1)		Third period	No scoring
Alec Dillon (17 saves / 19 shots)		Goalie stats	Kris Oldham (34 saves / 37 shots)

April 18	Tri-City Storm	3 – 1	Omaha Lancers	Viaero Center
Daniel Labosky (2) - 4:28		First period	2:09 - pp - Shane Gersich (1)
Mason Appleton (2) - 4:08		Second period	No scoring
Chris Wilkie (1) - pp - 0:42		Third period	No scoring
Alec Dillon (28 saves / 29 shots); Jared Rutledge (0 saves / 0 shots)		Goalie stats	Kris Oldham (36 saves / 39 shots)

Tri-City wins series 3 – 0

== Conference Finals ==
=== Eastern Conference ===
==== (3) Dubuque Fighting Saints vs. (4) Muskegon Lumberjacks ====
April 24	Dubuque Fighting Saints	2 – 4	Muskegon Lumberjacks	Mystique Ice Center
No scoring		First period	No scoring
1:12 - pp - Seamus Malone (2); 6:02 - Nate Sucese (2)		Second period	Mark Petaccio (2) - pp - 2:20
No scoring		Third period	Corey Schueneman (2) - 12:54; Corey Schueneman (3) - 17:35; Ryan Siroky (1) - en - 19:46
Jacob Nehama (28 saves / 31 shots)		Goalie stats	Eric Schierhorn (45 saves / 47 shots)

April 25	Dubuque Fighting Saints	7 – 3	Muskegon Lumberjacks	Mystique Ice Center
12:04 - Seamus Malone (3); 15:16 - pp - Brett Boeing (2); 16:56 - Evan Smith (2)		First period	Mark Petaccio (3) - 6:57
5:13 - sh - Nate Sucese (3); 8:24 - Hayden Shaw (2); 9:50 - Jacob Benson (2)		Second period	Corey Schueneman (4) - pp - 6:12; Tommy Marchin (1) - 9:19
6:32 - Mitchell Smith (2)		Third period	No scoring
Jacob Nehama (25 saves / 28 shots)		Goalie stats	Eric Schierhorn (31 saves / 38 shots)

May 1	Muskegon Lumberjacks	3 – 1	Dubuque Fighting Saints	L.C. Walker Arena
8:59 - pp - Tommy Marchin (2); 14:55 - Matej Paulovič (1)		First period	No scoring
No scoring		Second period	No scoring
18:07 - en - Griffen Molino (3)		Third period	Jacob Benson (3) - 17:02
Eric Schierhorn (46 saves / 47 shots)		Goalie stats	Jacob Nehama (32 saves / 34 shots)

May 2	Muskegon Lumberjacks	0 – 6	Dubuque Fighting Saints	L.C. Walker Arena
No scoring		First period	Dylan Gambrell (2) - 19:18
No scoring		Second period	Jacob Benson (4) - 6:36; Seamus Malone (4) - pp - 19:49
No scoring		Third period	Willie Knierim (3) - pp - 0:32; Willie Knierim (4) - 7:05; Mitchell Smith (3) - 15:27
Eric Schierhorn (40 saves / 45 shots); Michael Latorella (5 saves / 6 shots)		Goalie stats	Jacob Nehama (26 saves / 26 shots)

May 5	Dubuque Fighting Saints	3 – 4	Muskegon Lumberjacks	Mystique Ice Center
No scoring		First period	Mark Petaccio (4) - pp - 7:42; Max Humitz (1) - 8:47
2:42 - pp - Jacob Benson (5)		Second period	Max Humitz (2) - 7:20; Juraj Milý (1) - 15:55
10:42 - pp - Dylan Gambrell (3); 10:42 - pp - Hayden Shaw (4)		Third period	No scoring
Jacob Nehama (19 saves / 23 shots)		Goalie stats	Eric Schierhorn (39 saves / 42 shots)

Muskegon wins series 3 – 2

=== Western Conference ===
==== (3) Tri-City Storm vs. (4) Sioux Falls Stampede ====
April 24	Tri-City Storm	4 – 2	Sioux Falls Stampede	Viaero Center
7:02 - pp - Bobby Nardella (1)		First period	Logan O'Connor (4) - 19:58
15:21 - Nick Master (1); 17:12 - Chase Berger (1)		Second period	No scoring
8:14 - pp - Chase Berger (2)		Third period	Kieffer Bellows (3) - 19:28
Alec Dillon (27 saves / 29 shots)		Goalie stats	Stefanos Lekkas (24 saves / 28 shots)

April 29	Tri-City Storm	2 – 3	Sioux Falls Stampede	Viaero Center
No scoring		First period	Troy Loggins (5) - 17:47
12:32 - pp - Mason Appleton (3); 18:24 - Bobby Nardella (2)		Second period	Mikey Eyssimont (4) - 15:10; Mikey Eyssimont (5) - 17:22
No scoring		Third period	No scoring
Alec Dillon (22 saves / 25 shots)		Goalie stats	Stefanos Lekkas (34 saves / 36 shots)

May 1	Sioux Falls Stampede	4 – 3	Tri-City Storm	Denny Sanford Premier Center
4:47 - Troy Loggins (6)		First period	No scoring
19:56 - pp - Troy Loggins (7)		Second period	Chris Wilkie (2) - pp - 7:23
6:08 - sh - Logan O'Connor (5); 18:27 - Ryan Schwalbe (1)		Third period	Mason Appleton (4) - pp - 11:06; Chase Berger (3) - 15:24
Stefanos Lekkas (19 saves / 22 shots)		Goalie stats	Alec Dillon (36 saves / 40 shots)

May 2	Sioux Falls Stampede	7 – 3	Tri-City Storm	Denny Sanford Premier Center
5:48 - Mikey Eyssimont (6); 8:35 - pp - Kieffer Bellows (4); 10:24 - Mikey Eyssimont (7)		First period	Vince Pedrie (1) - 0:31
4:07 - Kieffer Bellows (5); 11:42 - J.M. Piotrowski (1)		Second period	Nick Master (2) - pp - 17:45
15:26 - Kieffer Bellows (6); 16:48 - en - Troy Loggins (8)		Third period	Chris Wilkie (3) - 6:47
Stefanos Lekkas (35 saves / 38 shots)		Goalie stats	Jared Rutledge (23 saves / 29 shots)

Sioux Falls wins series 3 – 1

== Clark Cup Finals ==
Note 1: All times are local.
Note 2: Game times in italics signify games to be played only if necessary.
Note 3: Home team is listed first.

=== (E4) Muskegon Lumberjacks vs. (W4) Sioux Falls Stampede ===
May 9	Muskegon Lumberjacks	2 – 3	Sioux Falls Stampede	L.C. Walker Arena
No scoring		First period	No scoring
4:12 - pp - Matej Paulovič (2)		Second period	No scoring
11:30 - Mark Petaccio (5)		Third period	Dakota Joshua (3) - 5:58; Ryan Schwalbe (2) - 10:52; J.M. Piotrowski (2) - 14:08
Eric Schierhorn (34 saves / 37 shots)		Goalie stats	Stefanos Lekkas (32 saves / 34 shots)

May 10	Muskegon Lumberjacks	1 – 6	Sioux Falls Stampede	L.C. Walker Arena
No scoring		First period	No scoring
No scoring		Second period	Joey Raats (1) - 1:09; Kieffer Bellows (7) - 1:19; Troy Loggins (9) - pp - 10:02; Collin Peters (1) - pp - 12:40; Lawton Courtnall (1) - 17:30
13:25 - Matt Iacopelli (5)		Third period	Kieffer Bellows (8) - en - 13:52
Eric Schierhorn (16 saves / 20 shots); Michael Latorella (14 saves / 15 shots)		Goalie stats	Stefanos Lekkas (29 saves / 30 shots); Artt Brey (0 saves / 0 shots)

May 15	Sioux Falls Stampede	4 – 2	Muskegon Lumberjacks	Denny Sanford Premier Center
No scoring		First period	No scoring
0:18 - Dakota Joshua (4); 10:07 - sh - Troy Loggins (10); 16:19 - sh - Kieffer Bellows (9)		Second period	No scoring
19:46 - en - Logan O'Connor (6)		Third period	Mason Jobst (1) - 1:59; Matej Paulovič (3) - pp - 9:29
Stefanos Lekkas (33 saves / 35 shots)		Goalie stats	Eric Schierhorn (27 saves / 30 shots)

Sioux Falls wins series 3 – 0

== Playoff Statistics ==
Statistics reflect games played through May 15, 2015

=== Scoring leaders ===
Note: GP = Games played; G = Goals; A = Assists; PTS = Points; PIM = Penalty minutes

Player	Team	GP	G	A	PTS	PIM
Troy Loggins	Sioux Falls Stampede	12	10	6	16	10
Mikey Eyssimont	Sioux Falls Stampede	12	7	9	16	20
Dakota Joshua	Sioux Falls Stampede	12	4	9	13	38
Kieffer Bellows	Sioux Falls Stampede	12	4	10	14	12
Corey Schueneman	Muskegon Lumberjacks	12	4	8	12	8
Hayden Shaw	Dubuque Fighting Saints	12	3	9	12	8
Cooper Marody	Sioux Falls Stampede	12	1	11	12	10
Logan O'Connor	Sioux Falls Stampede	12	6	4	10	2
Seamus Malone	Dubuque Fighting Saints	8	4	6	10	2
Jacob Benson	Dubuque Fighting Saints	8	5	4	9	0
Nate Sucese	Dubuque Fighting Saints	8	3	6	9	6
Griffen Molino	Muskegon Lumberjacks	12	3	6	9	10
Bobby Nardella	Tri-City Storm	7	2	7	9	4

=== Leading goaltenders ===
Note: GP = Games played; MIN = Minutes played; W = Wins; L = Losses; SO = Shutouts; GA = Goals Allowed; GAA = Goals against average; SV% = Save percentage

Player	Team	GP	MIN	W	L	SO	GA	GAA	SV%
Colin DeAugustine	Youngstown Phantoms	2	155	1	1	0	4	1.55	0.948
Stefanos Lekkas	Sioux Falls Stampede	12	714	9	3	0	25	2.10	0.932
Jacob Nehama	Dubuque Fighting Saints	8	474	5	3	1	17	2.15	0.928
Alec Dillon	Tri-City Storm	6	359	4	2	0	13	2.17	0.923
Kris Oldham	Omaha Lancers	3	176	0	3	0	8	2.73	0.919
