= Stefanos Lekkas =

Canadian ice hockey player (born 1996)

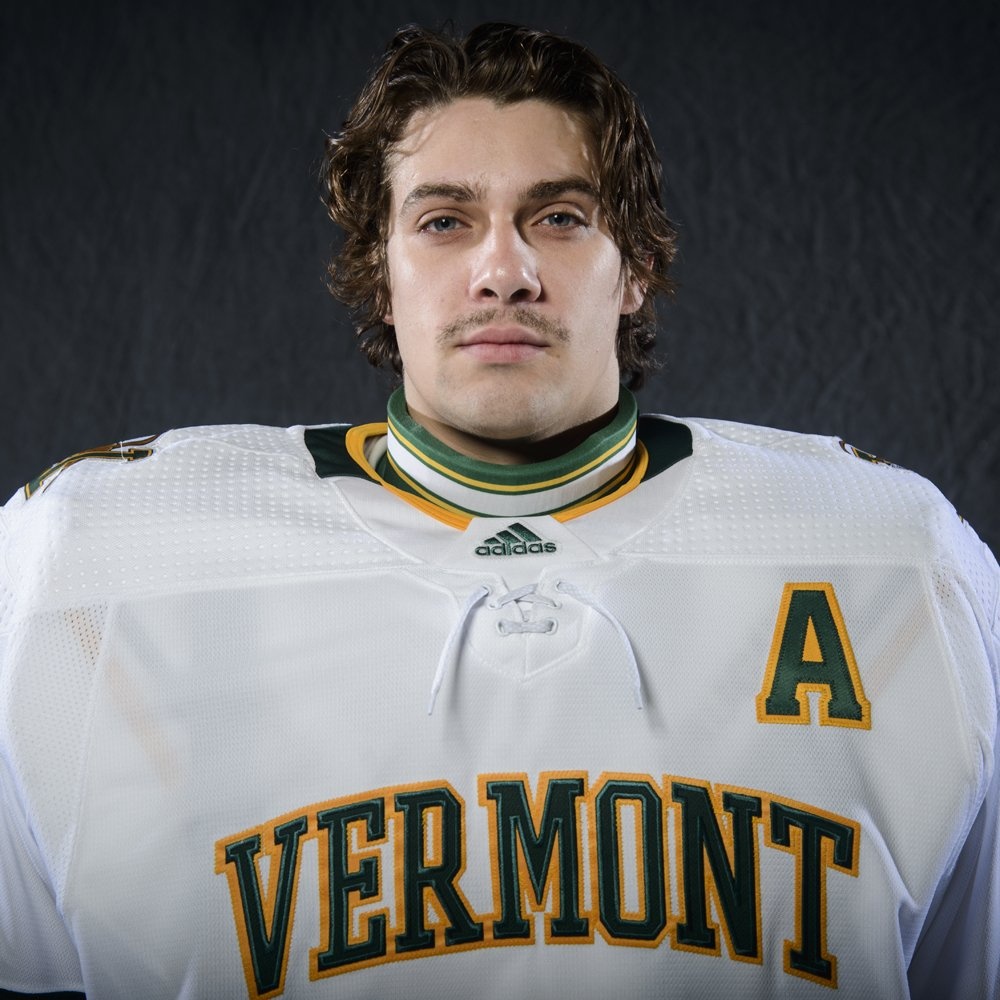
- Lekkas with Vermont in 2020
- Born: January 17, 1996 (age 30) Elburn, Illinois, U.S.
- Height: 6 ft 0 in (183 cm)
- Weight: 180 lb (82 kg; 12 st 12 lb)
- Position: Goaltender
- Shoots: Left
- Liiga team Former teams: KalPa; Rochester Americans
- NHL draft: Undrafted
- Playing career: 2020–present

Stefanos Lekkas (born January 17, 1996) is an American professional ice hockey goaltender who is currently playing with KalPa in the Finnish top-tier ice hockey league, Liiga.

== Playing career ==
=== Junior ===
Lekkas played for the Springfield Jr. Blues of the NAHL and the Sioux Falls Stampede of the USHL. He helped lead the Stampede to a Clark Cup championship in the 2014–15 season.

=== College ===
Lekkas played four seasons for the University of Vermont. He played 134 games for the Catamounts and set a Hockey East record for the most career saves (3,913). He also left as the Catamounts' all-time leader in save percentage (.918).

=== Professional ===
After his junior season at Vermont, Lekkas was invited to development camps by the NHL's Chicago Blackhawks and Florida Panthers but was not signed. Instead, he returned to college, and signed with the Fort Wayne Komets of the ECHL after his senior season.

He was loaned to the Rochester Americans of the AHL on March 15, 2021. The team signed him to a professional tryout contract two days later. Lekkas was signed to a one-year contract by the NHL's Buffalo Sabres on May 5, 2021.

After he was not tendered a qualifying offer by the Sabres to retain his rights, Lekkas returned his ECHL club, the Fort Wayne Komets, agreeing to a one-year contract on July 29, 2021. Lekkas was later released and bounced around between the Orlando Solar Bears and Wheeling Nailers, before being traded to the Maine Mariners. After helping the Mariners reach their first postseason appearance in franchise history, Maine loaned him to the Chicago Wolves of the AHL for the 2022 Calder Cup playoffs.

On June 16, 2022, Lekkas as a free agent opted to pursue a European career in agreeing to a one-year contract with Danish club, Odense Bulldogs of the Metal Ligaen.

His European career continued in next season, as he signed with Finnish team, KalPa from Kuopio.
