= William Lagesson =

Swedish ice hockey player (born 1996)

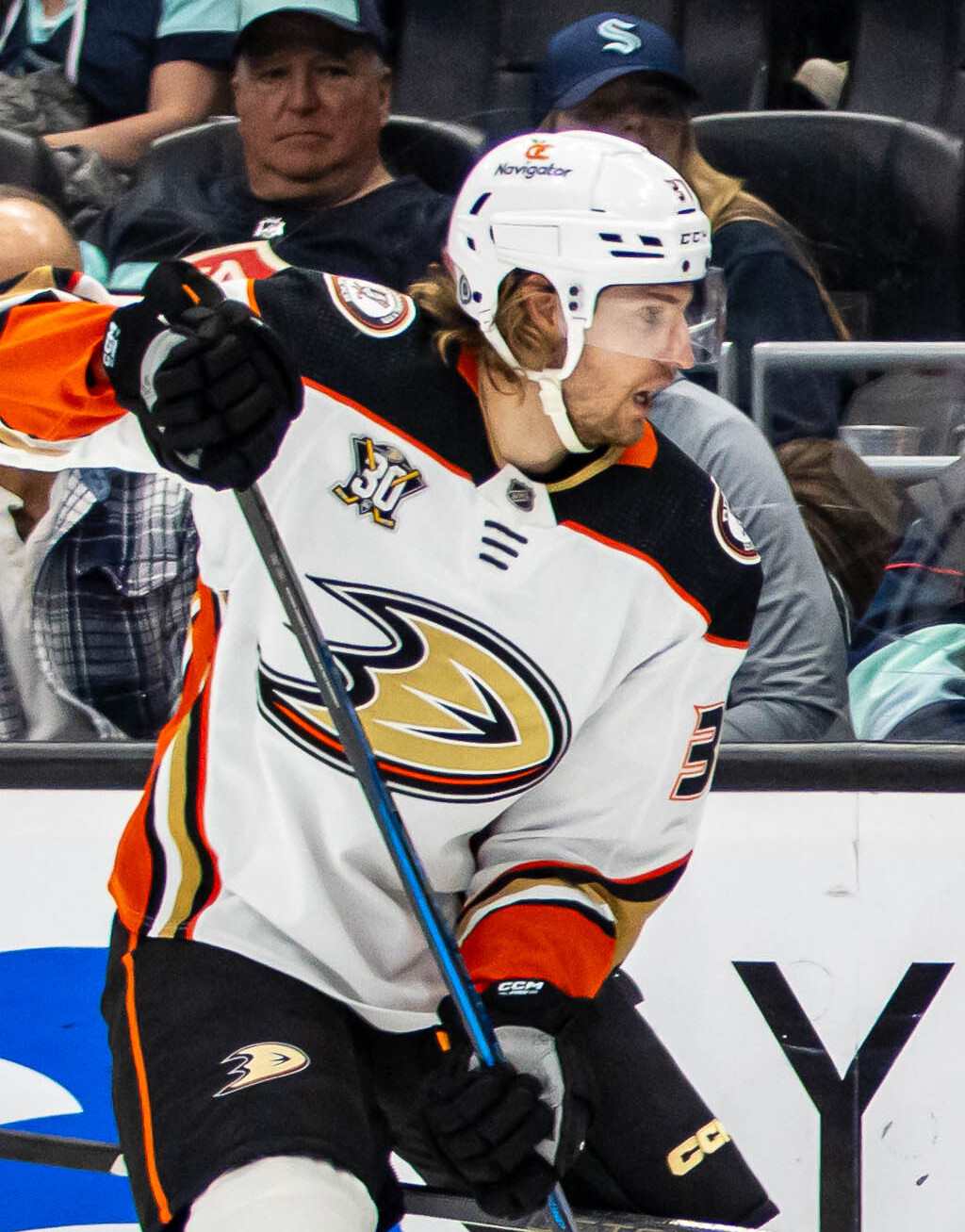
- Lagesson with the Anaheim Ducks in 2024
- Born: 22 February 1996 (age 30) Gothenburg, Sweden
- Height: 6 ft 2 in (188 cm)
- Weight: 207 lb (94 kg; 14 st 11 lb)
- Position: Defence
- Shoots: Left
- NHL team (P) Cur. team Former teams: Detroit Red Wings; Grand Rapids Griffins (AHL); Djurgårdens IF; Edmonton Oilers; Montreal Canadiens; Toronto Maple Leafs; Anaheim Ducks
- NHL draft: 91st overall, 2014; Edmonton Oilers
- Playing career: 2017–present

William Lagesson (born 22 February 1996) is a Swedish professional ice hockey defenceman for the Grand Rapids Griffins in the American Hockey League (AHL) while under contract to the Detroit Red Wings of the National Hockey League (NHL). He was selected in the fourth round, 91st overall, by the Edmonton Oilers in the 2014 NHL entry draft. Lagesson has also previously played for the Montreal Canadiens, Toronto Maple Leafs and Anaheim Ducks.

== Playing career ==
Lagesson played as a youth in his native Sweden within the Frölunda HC organization. Following his second season in the J20 SuperElit, Lagesson was drafted in his first year of eligibility by the Edmonton Oilers of the National Hockey League (NHL) in the fourth round, 91st overall, of the 2014 NHL entry draft. Opting to continue his development in North America, Lagesson was selected 11th overall in the 2014 United States Hockey League (USHL) Entry Draft by the Dubuque Fighting Saints.

He played in the 2014–15 season with the Fighting Saints of the USHL, before committing to a collegiate career with the University of Massachusetts Amherst of Hockey East. Lagesson played two years with the struggling Minutemen program before leaving after his sophomore season and deciding to turn pro, in signing a three-year entry-level contract with the Edmonton Oilers on 7 April 2017.

On 8 May 2017, it was announced by the Oilers that Lagesson would spend the 2017–18 season in Sweden on loan with Djurgårdens IF of the Swedish Hockey League (SHL). While with Djurgården, Lagesson made his professional debut in solidifying a regular role on the blueline. In 49 appearances, he contributed with 1 goal and 12 assists for 13 points in the regular season. He continued his steady play in the post-season with an assist in 11 games.

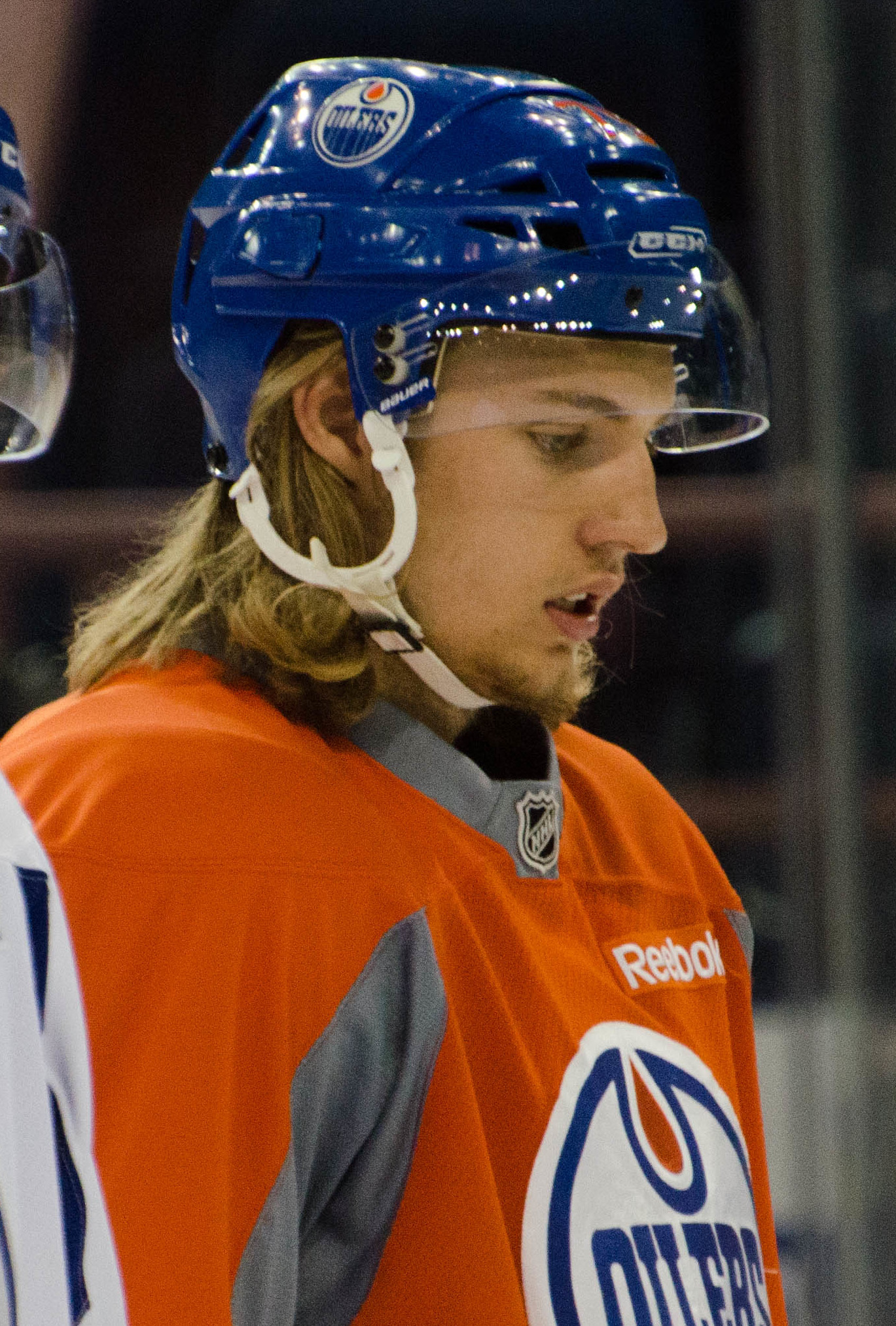
Lagesson on the Edmonton Oilers in 2015

Returning to the Oilers over the summer, and after participating in the NHL training camp, Lagesson was assigned to begin the 2018–19 season with their American Hockey League (AHL) affiliate, the Bakersfield Condors, on 20 September 2018. As an impending restricted free agent with the Oilers and with the commencement 2020–21 North American indefinitely delayed due to the COVID-19 pandemic in North America, Lagesson signed a one-year contract in Sweden with second-tier club, HC Vita Hästen of the HockeyAllsvenskan, on 23 September 2020. He registered three goals and 12 points in 14 games with Vita Hästen.

During the 2021–22 season Lagesson returned to North America and played in 30 games with the Oilers, registering four points and 11 games with the Condors, scoring two points. On 21 March 2022, Lagesson was traded by the Oilers, along with a conditional second round pick in the 2022 NHL entry draft and a 2024 seventh-round pick to the Montreal Canadiens in exchange for defenceman Brett Kulak. Following the conclusion of his contract with the Canadiens, Lagesson as a free agent was signed to a one-year, two-way contract with the Carolina Hurricanes on 25 July 2022. However, Lagesson never played with the Hurricanes, spending the entire 2022–23 season with Carolina's AHL affiliate, the Chicago Wolves. He played in 65 games scoring 10 goals and 32 points.

On 1 July 2023, Lagesson left the Hurricanes organization and signed as a free agent to a one-year, two-way contract with the Toronto Maple Leafs. He attended the Maple Leafs 2023 training camp, but failed to make the team and was placed on waivers. After going unclaimed Lagesson was assigned to the Maple Leafs AHL affiliate, the Toronto Marlies to start the 2023–24 season. After an injury to Jake McCabe, the Maple Leafs recalled Lagesson on 27 October. He made his Maple Leafs season debut on 28 October in a 3–2 overtime loss to the Nashville Predators. Lagesson in a third-pairing role remained with the Maple Leafs and appeared in 30 regular season games adding four assists.

Approaching the NHL trade deadline, Lagesson was placed on waivers by the Maple Leafs, and was subsequently claimed by the Anaheim Ducks on 9 March 2024. Lagesson made his Ducks debut on 12 March 2024 in a 7–2 loss to the Chicago Blackhawks. He completed the season with the Ducks going scoreless through ten games.

On 1 July 2024, Lagesson signed as a free agent to a one-year, $775,000 contract with the Detroit Red Wings. He was placed on waivers and after going unclaimed, was assigned to Detroit's AHL affiliate, the Grand Rapids Griffins, for the 2024–25 season.

== International play ==
Lagesson was selected for Sweden's junior team to play at the 2015 World Junior Ice Hockey Championships. However, the team lost the bronze medal game to Slovakia to finish fourth in the tournament. He returned for Sweden at the 2016 World Junior Ice Hockey Championships, playing on the top pair alongside Gustav Forsling, winning their group. However, the team lost the bronze medal game again, this time to the United States. Lagesson scored in the final, but the Americans won the game 8–3.

== Career statistics ==
=== Regular season and playoffs ===
			Regular season					Playoffs
Season	Team	League	GP	G	A	Pts	PIM	GP	G	A	Pts	PIM
2011–12	Frölunda HC	J18	11	0	2	2	0	—	—	—	—	—
2011–12	Frölunda HC	J18 Allsv	14	0	1	1	2	2	0	0	0	0
2012–13	Frölunda HC	J18	20	1	12	13	60	—	—	—	—	—
2012–13	Frölunda HC	J18 Allsv	12	3	3	6	14	3	1	2	3	4
2012–13	Frölunda HC	J20	6	0	0	0	0	2	0	0	0	0
2013–14	Frölunda HC	J18 Allsv	4	0	1	1	0	5	2	2	4	10
2013–14	Frölunda HC	J20	44	8	12	20	30	3	0	1	1	2
2014–15	Dubuque Fighting Saints	USHL	52	2	14	16	79	8	1	1	2	4
2015–16	UMass Minutemen	HE	27	2	5	7	26	—	—	—	—	—
2016–17	UMass Minutemen	HE	36	2	6	8	28	—	—	—	—	—
2017–18	Djurgårdens IF	SHL	49	1	12	13	30	11	0	1	1	31
2018–19	Bakersfield Condors	AHL	67	8	19	27	45	10	2	2	4	4
2019–20	Bakersfield Condors	AHL	25	3	7	10	18	—	—	—	—	—
2019–20	Edmonton Oilers	NHL	8	0	0	0	0	—	—	—	—	—
2020–21	HC Vita Hästen	Allsv	11	3	6	9	10	—	—	—	—	—
2020–21	Kristianstads IK	Allsv	3	0	3	3	2	—	—	—	—	—
2020–21	Edmonton Oilers	NHL	19	0	2	2	9	—	—	—	—	—
2021–22	Bakersfield Condors	AHL	11	0	2	2	9	—	—	—	—	—
2021–22	Edmonton Oilers	NHL	30	0	4	4	13	—	—	—	—	—
2021–22	Montreal Canadiens	NHL	3	0	1	1	0	—	—	—	—	—
2022–23	Chicago Wolves	AHL	65	10	22	32	46	—	—	—	—	—
2023–24	Toronto Marlies	AHL	5	0	1	1	0	—	—	—	—	—
2023–24	Toronto Maple Leafs	NHL	30	0	4	4	19	—	—	—	—	—
2023–24	Anaheim Ducks	NHL	10	0	0	0	13	—	—	—	—	—
2024–25	Grand Rapids Griffins	AHL	23	3	6	9	18	—	—	—	—	—
2024–25	Detroit Red Wings	NHL	7	0	1	1	4	—	—	—	—	—
2025–26	Grand Rapids Griffins	AHL	61	3	18	21	36	8	0	1	1	20
SHL totals			49	1	12	13	30	11	0	1	1	31
NHL totals			107	0	12	12	58	—	—	—	—	—

=== International ===
Year	Team	Event	Result	GP	G	A	Pts	PIM
2013	Sweden	U17	1st place, gold medalist(s)	6	0	1	1	12
2013	Sweden	IH18	7th	4	1	1	2	2
2014	Sweden	U18	4th	7	3	0	3	6
2015	Sweden	WJC	4th	7	0	1	1	8
2016	Sweden	WJC	4th	7	2	1	3	4
Junior totals				31	6	4	10	32
