= Gary DeGrio =

American ice hockey player

- Born: February 16, 1960 (age 66) Duluth, Minnesota, U.S.
- Height: 5 ft 11 in (180 cm)
- Weight: 180 lb (82 kg; 12 st 12 lb)
- Position: Forward
- Played for: Tulsa Oilers; Salt Lake Golden Eagles; Dundee Tigers
- National team: United States
- NHL draft: Undrafted
- Playing career: 1982–1988

Gary DeGrio (born February 16, 1960) is an American former professional ice hockey Forward. DeGrio was member of the Tulsa Oilers (CHL) team that suspended operations on February 16, 1984, playing only road games for final six weeks of 1983–84 season. Despite this adversity, the team went on to win the league's championship.

== Playing career ==
DeGrio played collegiate ice hockey for the University of Minnesota Duluth's men's ice hockey team from 1978 to 1982. As a professional, DeGrio played with the Tulsa Oilers in the CHL for the 1982–83 and 1983–84 seasons, winning the 1983–84 CHL Championship (Adams Cup) as a member of the Oilers, coached team coached by Tom Webster. DeGrio then spent the next three season with the Salt Lake Golden Eagles in the IHL, before playing his final season (1987–88) of hockey with the Dundee Tigers of the Scottish National League.

== Personal life ==
Both DeGrio's brother-in-law Dave Johnson and nephew Adam Johnson played hockey. Both Dave and Adam played collegiate hockey for the University of Minnesota Duluth, with Dave and DeGrio playing as teammates for several seasons, and Adam eventually played professionally, primarily in minor leagues but did appeared in 13 games for the Pittsburgh Penguins in the National Hockey League. Adam was killed in an on-ice accident in October 2023 while playing professionally for the Nottingham Panthers.
