= Christian Wolanin =

American ice hockey player (born 1995)

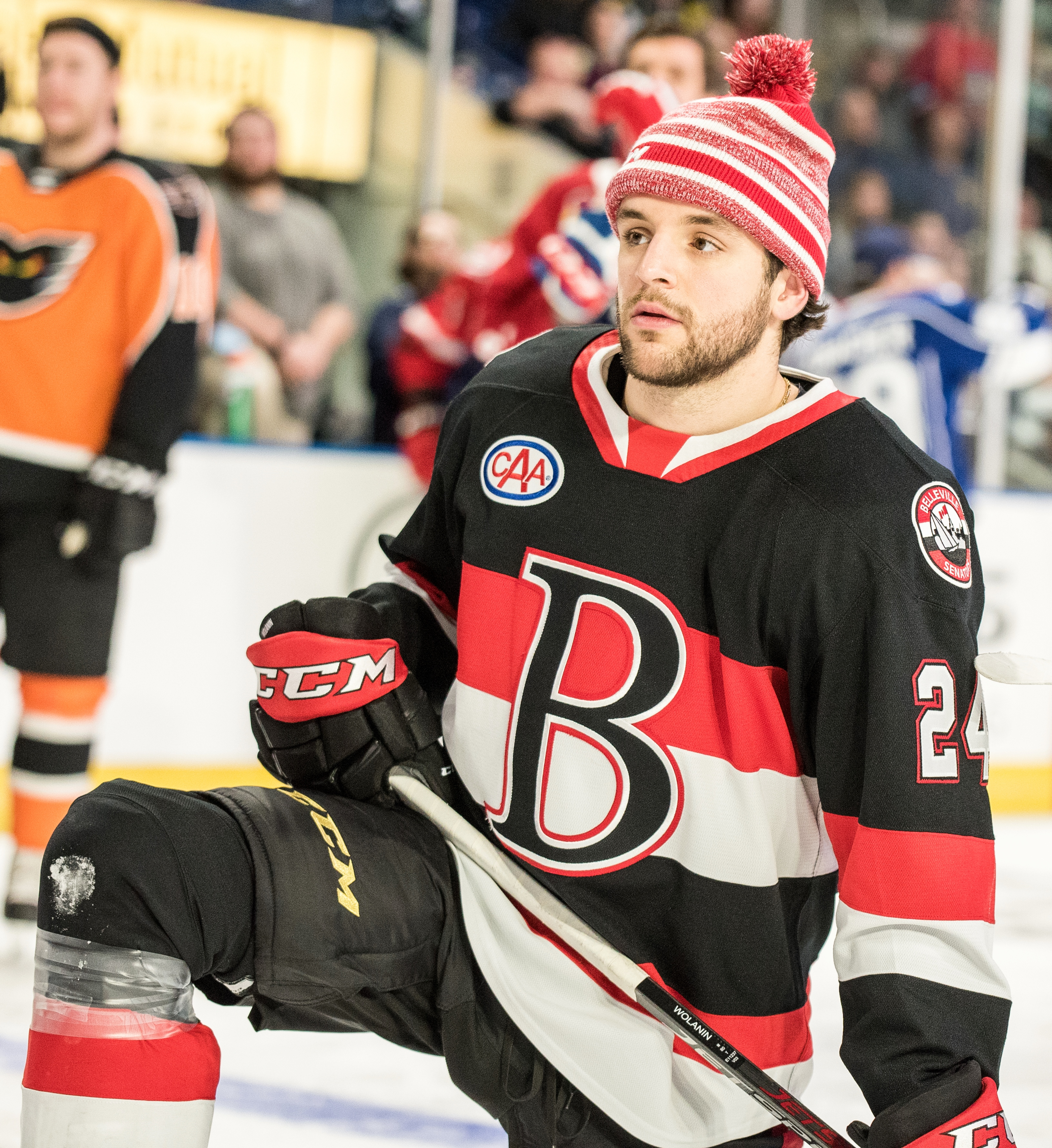
- Wolanin with the Belleville Senators in 2019
- Born: March 17, 1995 (age 31) Quebec City, Quebec, Canada
- Height: 6 ft 2 in (188 cm)
- Weight: 185 lb (84 kg; 13 st 3 lb)
- Position: Defence
- Shoots: Left
- NHL team (P) Cur. team Former teams: Colorado Avalanche; Colorado Eagles (AHL); Ottawa Senators; Los Angeles Kings; Buffalo Sabres; Vancouver Canucks
- National team: United States
- NHL draft: 107th overall, 2015; Ottawa Senators
- Playing career: 2018–present

Christian Wolanin (born March 17, 1995) is a Canadian-American professional ice hockey player who is a defenceman for the Colorado Eagles of the American Hockey League (AHL) while under contract to the Colorado Avalanche of the National Hockey League (NHL). Wolanin was selected by the Ottawa Senators in the fourth round, 107th overall, in the 2015 NHL entry draft.

== Playing career ==
Wolanin began his hockey career with the Green Bay Gamblers and Muskegon Lumberjacks in the United States Hockey League (USHL). While with the Lumberjacks, Wolanin was named to the USHL Second All-Star Team. After playing in the USHL, Wolanin committed to the University of North Dakota.

While majoring in communications at North Dakota, Wolanin played in 32 games during his freshman season, and ranked third in the conference among rookie defensemen in scoring as UND won the national championship. He was named to the NCHC Academic All-Conference Team at the conclusion of the season. In his sophomore season, Wolanin tied for fifth amongst NCHC defensemen in scoring but led all conference defensemen during the playoffs. Wolanin helped the Fighting Hawks qualify for the 2017 Frozen Faceoff after he recorded the game-tying goal in game two of the NCHC Quarterfinals against the St. Cloud Huskies to send the game to overtime.

After playing three seasons with the North Dakota Fighting Hawks, Wolanin signed a two-year entry-level contract with the Senators. He made his NHL debut on March 22, 2018, in a 6–2 loss to the Edmonton Oilers. He scored his first NHL goal April 2, 2018 in a game against the Winnipeg Jets.

Wolanin spent the beginning of the 2018–19 season with the Senators American Hockey League (AHL) affiliate, the Belleville Senators, but was recalled to the NHL on October 25. On January 23, 2019, Wolanin was added to the 2019 AHL All-Star Game roster.

On July 4, 2019, Wolanin was signed to a two-year, $1.8 million contract extension with the final year on a one-way basis. Wolanin was hampered by injuries throughout the duration of his two-year contract. While in his final season under contract in the pandemic delayed 2020–21 season, Wolanin was traded by the Senators to the Los Angeles Kings in exchange for Michael Amadio on March 29, 2021.

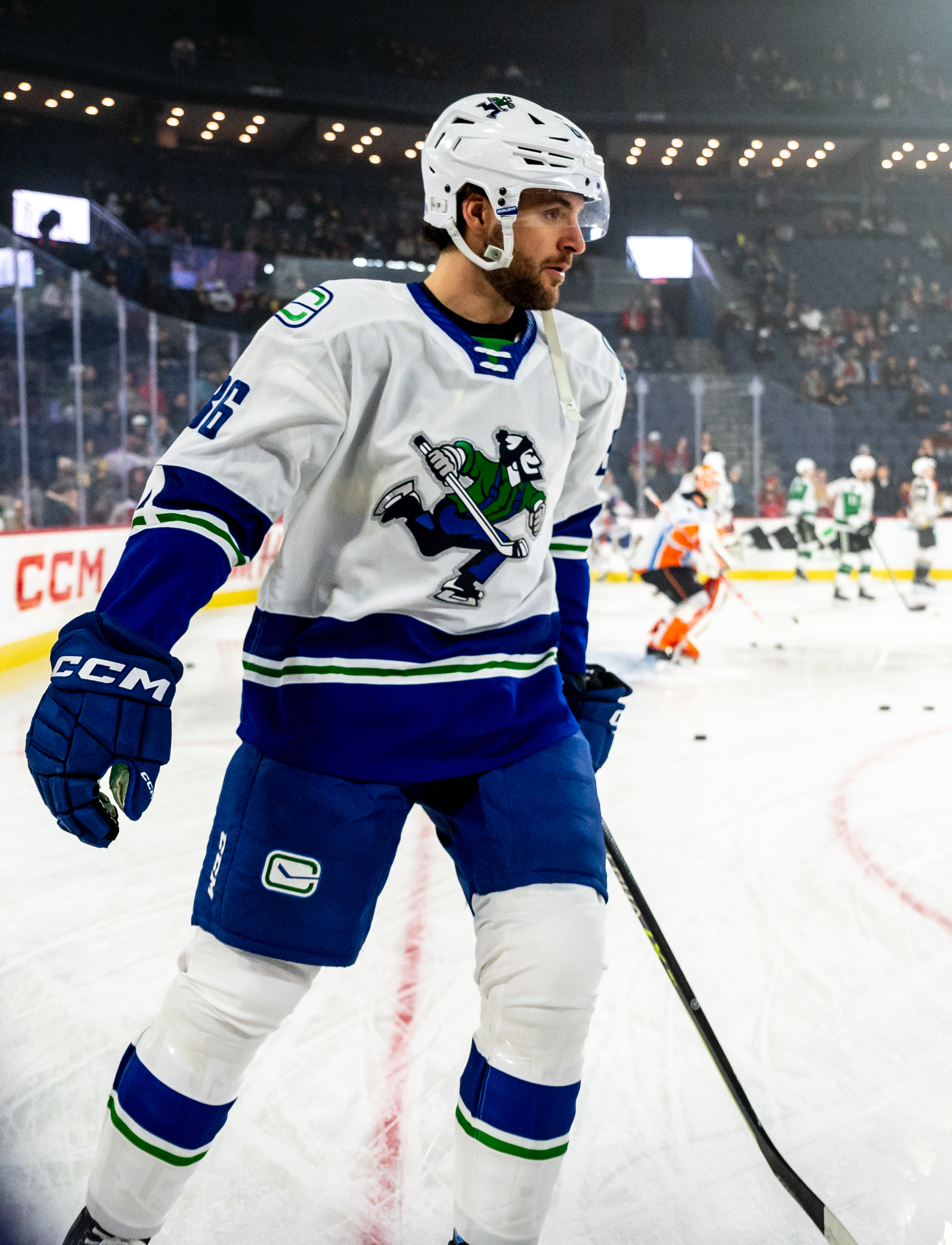
Wolanin during the 2023 AHL All-Star Skills Competition.

Wolanin re-signed with the Kings on July 6, 2021, agreeing to a one-year, $750,000 contract extension. After attending the Kings 2021 training camp, Wolanin remained on the roster to open the 2021–22 season. Before making an appearance, Wolanin was placed on waivers and subsequently claimed by the Buffalo Sabres on October 16, 2021. Wolanin remained with the Sabres as added blueline depth insurance featuring in a lone contest, going scoreless in a 5–3 defeat to the Washington Capitals on November 8, 2021. Wolanin's brief tenure with the Sabres ended on December 1, 2021, after he was re-claimed off waivers by the Kings and was immediately re-assigned to AHL affiliate, the Ontario Reign.

As a free agent in the following off-season, Wolanin was signed to a one-year, two-way contract with the Vancouver Canucks on July 14, 2022.

Following the 2025 Calder Cup playoffs, Wolanin remained un-signed over the summer and was belatedly signed into the 2025–26 season to a professional tryout contract with the Providence Bruins, affiliate to the Boston Bruins. The Providence Bruins later signed Wolanin to a one-year contract on December 7, 2025. Wolanin appeared in 53 game with Providence, pacing the team amongst blueliners with 24 assists and 31 points.

As a free agent, Wolanin secured a NHL contract for the 2026–27 season by signing a one-year, two-way contract with the Colorado Avalanche on July 4, 2026.

== Personal life ==
Wolanin's father, Craig, played in 695 NHL games and won a Stanley Cup with the Colorado Avalanche in 1996. As a result of his father's career, Wolanin lived in Quebec City, Denver, Tampa and Toronto before his family permanently settled in Rochester, Michigan. He is a dual citizen of both Canada and the United States. and chose to play for the U.S. national team for the first time at the 2019 IIHF World Championship.

== Career statistics ==
=== Regular season and playoffs ===
			Regular season					Playoffs
Season	Team	League	GP	G	A	Pts	PIM	GP	G	A	Pts	PIM
2012–13	Green Bay Gamblers	USHL	54	0	8	8	70	4	1	0	1	2
2013–14	Green Bay Gamblers	USHL	23	1	4	5	30	—	—	—	—	—
2013–14	Muskegon Lumberjacks	USHL	32	5	16	21	44	—	—	—	—	—
2014–15	Muskegon Lumberjacks	USHL	56	14	27	41	107	12	3	5	8	20
2015–16	University of North Dakota	NCHC	32	4	11	15	20	—	—	—	—	—
2016–17	University of North Dakota	NCHC	37	6	16	22	37	—	—	—	—	—
2017–18	University of North Dakota	NCHC	40	12	23	35	50	—	—	—	—	—
2017–18	Ottawa Senators	NHL	10	1	2	3	0	—	—	—	—	—
2018–19	Belleville Senators	AHL	40	7	24	31	24	—	—	—	—	—
2018–19	Ottawa Senators	NHL	30	4	8	12	6	—	—	—	—	—
2019–20	Belleville Senators	AHL	9	1	0	1	7	—	—	—	—	—
2019–20	Ottawa Senators	NHL	3	0	0	0	0	—	—	—	—	—
2020–21	Ottawa Senators	NHL	15	0	3	3	6	—	—	—	—	—
2020–21	Belleville Senators	AHL	1	0	0	0	0	—	—	—	—	—
2020–21	Ontario Reign	AHL	2	0	3	3	2	—	—	—	—	—
2020–21	Los Angeles Kings	NHL	3	0	0	0	2	—	—	—	—	—
2021–22	Buffalo Sabres	NHL	1	0	0	0	0	—	—	—	—	—
2021–22	Ontario Reign	AHL	37	1	17	18	22	5	1	3	4	4
2021–22	Los Angeles Kings	NHL	8	1	1	2	2	—	—	—	—	—
2022–23	Abbotsford Canucks	AHL	49	6	49	55	22	6	1	4	5	2
2022–23	Vancouver Canucks	NHL	16	0	3	3	4	—	—	—	—	—
2023–24	Abbotsford Canucks	AHL	42	5	24	29	20	6	2	1	3	0
2024–25	Abbotsford Canucks	AHL	58	4	36	40	44	17	2	8	10	12
2025–26	Providence Bruins	AHL	53	7	24	31	14	2	0	1	1	12
NHL totals			86	6	17	23	20	—	—	—	—	—

Medal record

Representing United States

Ice hockey

World Championships
Bronze medal – third place	2021 Latvia	

=== International ===
Year	Team	Event	Result	GP	G	A	Pts	PIM
2019	United States	WC	7th	6	0	0	0	0
2021	United States	WC	3rd place, bronze medalist(s)	10	1	5	6	0
Senior totals				16	1	5	6	0

== Awards and honors ==
Award	Year	Ref
USHL
All-USHL Second Team	2015	
College
NCHC Academic All-Conference Team	2016, 2017	
AHL
Eddie Shore Award	2023	
Calder Cup Champion	2025	
