= Bobby Nardella =

American ice hockey player (born 1996)

- Born: April 22, 1996 (age 30) Rosemont, Illinois, U.S.
- Height: 5 ft 9 in (175 cm)
- Weight: 174 lb (79 kg; 12 st 6 lb)
- Position: Defense
- KHL team Former teams: Torpedo Nizhny Novgorod; Hershey Bears; Djurgårdens IF; HV71; SC Rapperswil-Jona Lakers
- NHL draft: Undrafted
- Playing career: 2018–present

Robert Virgil Nardella III (born April 22, 1996) is an American professional ice hockey defenseman for Torpedo Nizhny Novgorod in the Kontinental Hockey League (KHL).

== Playing career ==
=== Minor career ===
Growing up, Nardella attended Rosemont Elementary School and East Leyden High School before graduating from East High School (Sioux City, Iowa). After his freshman year of high school, Nardella decided to drop baseball, basketball and golf to focus on hockey.

Nardella played for the Chicago Mission Midget Minor during the 2011–12 season. He began the following season with the team but was unable to compete in the 2013 USA Hockey National Championships after suffering a knee injury in October.

=== USHL ===
Nardella was drafted eighth overall in the 2012 USHL Futures Draft by the Sioux City Musketeers. During his rookie season with the Musketeers, he recorded 13 points in 52 games. After impressing scouts during the season, Nardella committed to play collegiate hockey with the Notre Dame Fighting Irish after the 2014-15 season. He was subsequently traded to the Tri-City Storm where he had a breakout season, recording 10 goals and 32 assists to rank third amongst defenseman. As a result, he was selected for the 2014-15 All-USHL Second Team.

=== Collegiate ===
In his rookie season at Notre Dame, Nardella broke-out onto the collegiate scene tying fifth most points scored overall on the team and was ranked 13th for points-per-game nationally. As a result, he was named the teams Rookie of the Year following the conclusion of the season. He was selected to participate in the Columbus Blue Jackets Development Camp that summer.

In his sophomore season, Nardella helped the Irish participate in the 2017 Frozen Four. At the end of the season, Nardella was invited to participate in the Pittsburgh Penguins Development Camp.

During the 2017–18 academic year, Nardella helped the Irish participate in the 2018 National Championship, only to lose to Minnesota–Duluth. After his junior season, Nardella was invited to the Vegas Golden Knights Development Camp.

In his senior year with the Irish, Nardella became the 54th player in program history to record 100 points as he reached a new career high. He finished his last year with the team ranking seventh in scoring among defensemen with 23 goals and 77 assists. Due to his successful season, he was selected for the All-Big Ten First Team and earned Second Team (West) CCM/AHCA All-America honors.

=== Professional ===
On April 5, 2019, Nardella signed a two-year entry-level contract with the Washington Capitals of the National Hockey League. A few days later, he signed an amateur tryout agreement with the Capitals American Hockey League (AHL) affiliate, the Hershey Bears. He competed with the Capitals during their 2019 Pre-season games. He recorded his first career AHL goal on December 15, 2019, against the Lehigh Valley Phantoms.

After completing his first full season in the AHL with the Hershey Bears, with the following 2020–21 set to be delayed due to the ongoing pandemic, Nardella in order to resume playing was sent on a season long loan by the Capitals to Swedish top tier club, Djurgårdens IF of the Swedish Hockey League (SHL), on September 30, 2020. Nardella enjoyed a successful debut European season with Djurgårdens IF, posting 7 goals and leading the club with 26 assists and 33 points through 47 regular season games. Helping the team qualify for the playoffs, he added 1 assist in 3 games. On April 15, 2021, Nardella was re-assigned by the Capitals to rejoin AHL affiliate, the Hershey Bears for the remainder of the season.

Following two further seasons with the Bears and helping the club capture the Calder Cup in the 2022–23 campaign, Nardella left as a free agent in the off-season and returned to Sweden and the SHL, signing a one-year contract with HV71 on July 31, 2023.

After a lone season in Switzerland with SC Rapperswil-Jona Lakers in the National League (NL), Nardella continued his journeyman career in agreeing to a one-year contract with Russian club, Torpedo Nizhny Novgorod of the KHL, on June 5, 2025.

== International play ==
Nardella has represented the United States internationally. He represented his home country in the 2013 Ivan Hlinka Memorial Tournament and at the 2014 World Junior A Challenge.

== Personal life ==
Nardella comes from a hockey involved family. His father, Bob Nardella, is a retired ice hockey player and head coach with the Chicago Wolves of the American Hockey League. His great uncle Mike worked for the Chicago Blackhawks organization and his second cousin Frank played NCAA hockey for Dartmouth College. His younger brother Nicholas played in the North American Hockey League. Meanwhile, his mother Alicia is the head administrative assistant for the Rosemont Public Safety Department.

== Career statistics ==
=== Regular season and playoffs ===
| | | | Regular season | | | | | Playoffs |
| Season | Team | League | GP | G | A | Pts | PIM | GP | G | A | Pts | PIM |
|---|---|---|---|---|---|---|---|---|---|---|---|---|
| 2013–14 | Sioux City Musketeers | USHL | 52 | 1 | 12 | 13 | 14 | 6 | 1 | 1 | 2 | 0 |
| 2014–15 | Tri-City Storm | USHL | 56 | 10 | 32 | 42 | 31 | 7 | 2 | 7 | 9 | 4 |
| 2015–16 | University of Notre Dame | B1G | 35 | 4 | 20 | 24 | 18 | — | — | — | — | — |
| 2016–17 | University of Notre Dame | B1G | 34 | 7 | 14 | 21 | 26 | — | — | — | — | — |
| 2017–18 | University of Notre Dame | B1G | 40 | 5 | 19 | 24 | 14 | — | — | — | — | — |
| 2018–19 | University of Notre Dame | B1G | 38 | 8 | 26 | 34 | 20 | — | — | — | — | — |
| 2018–19 | Hershey Bears | AHL | 2 | 0 | 0 | 0 | 2 | — | — | — | — | — |
| 2019–20 | Hershey Bears | AHL | 41 | 4 | 27 | 31 | 18 | — | — | — | — | — |
| 2020–21 | Djurgårdens IF | SHL | 47 | 7 | 26 | 33 | 28 | 3 | 0 | 1 | 1 | 2 |
| 2021–22 | Hershey Bears | AHL | 44 | 6 | 17 | 23 | 18 | 3 | 0 | 2 | 2 | 0 |
| 2022–23 | Hershey Bears | AHL | 61 | 7 | 21 | 28 | 38 | 1 | 0 | 0 | 0 | 0 |
| 2023–24 | HV71 | SHL | 50 | 4 | 25 | 29 | 39 | — | — | — | — | — |
| 2024–25 | SC Rapperswil-Jona Lakers | NL | 32 | 6 | 13 | 19 | 10 | 2 | 0 | 0 | 0 | 2 |
| 2025–26 | Torpedo Nizhny Novgorod | KHL | 67 | 1 | 38 | 39 | 44 | 10 | 0 | 4 | 4 | 0 |
| SHL totals | | | 97 | 11 | 51 | 62 | 67 | 3 | 0 | 1 | 1 | 2 |

=== International ===
| Year | Team | Event | Result | GP | G | A | Pts | PIM |
|---|---|---|---|---|---|---|---|---|
| 2013 | United States | IH18 | 2nd place, silver medalist(s) | 5 | 0 | 1 | 1 | 4 |
| Junior totals | | | | 5 | 0 | 1 | 1 | 4 |

== Awards and honors ==
| Award | Year | Ref |
USHL
| All-USHL Second Team | 2015 | |
College
| Hockey East All-Rookie Team | 2016 | |
| Notre Dame Rookie of the Year | 2016 | |
| Big Ten's First Star of the Week | 2018 | |
| All-Big Ten First Team | 2019 | |
| Second Team (West) CCM/AHCA All-America | 2019 | |
AHL
| Calder Cup | 2023 | |
