= Troy Loggins =

American ice hockey player (born 1995)

- Born: July 21, 1995 (age 30) Huntington Beach, California, U.S.
- Height: 5 ft 9 in (175 cm)
- Weight: 161 lb (73 kg; 11 st 7 lb)
- Position: Left wing
- Shoots: Left
- team Former teams: Free agent Grand Rapids Griffins; Västerviks IK; HC Nové Zámky
- NHL draft: Undrafted
- Playing career: 2019–present

Troy Loggins (born July 21, 1995) is an American professional ice hockey forward who is currently an unrestricted free agent. He most recently played for the Tahoe Knight Monsters of the ECHL.

== Playing career ==
=== Junior ===
During the 2014–15 season, Loggins recorded 14 goals and 21 assists in 57 games for the Sioux Falls Stampede. During the Clark Cup playoffs, Loggins recorded 10 goals and six assists in 12 games to help lead the Stampede to win the Clark Cup. He was subsequently named Clark Cup MVP.

=== College ===
Loggins began his collegiate career for the Northern Michigan Wildcats during the 2015–16 season. He recorded three assists in 16 games, before suffering an injury. During the 2016–17 season, he recorded 10 goals and six assists in 38 games for the Wildcats. He recorded his first collegiate goal on October 7, 2016, in a game against Wisconsin.

During the 2017–18 season, he recorded a career-high 23 goals and 24 assists in 43 games. In Game 3 of the WCHA Semifinals, Loggins scored the overtime winner against Bowling Green to send Northern Michigan to their first conference championship game since their 2-1 loss against Michigan in the 2010 CCHA Championship. His 23 goals tied for ninth-most in the NCAA. Following his outstanding season, he was named to the All-WCHA First Team. During the 2018–19 season, Loggins was WCHA scoring champion with 32 points on a league-high 20 goals and 12 assists in 28 league games. He finished the season with a career-high tying 23 goals and led the team in points (40), goals per game (0.59), points per game (1.03), and shots on goal per game (3.97). He led the WCHA in power play goals (10) and shorthanded goals (3), and led the NCAA in shots on goal (155). He recorded his first career hat-trick on March 1, 2019, in a game against Michigan Tech. Following his outstanding season, he was named WCHA Offensive Player of the Year, and named to the All-WCHA First Team, and AHCA/CCM Second Team All-American.

=== Professional ===
On March 20, 2019, Loggins signed a three-year contract with the Grand Rapids Griffins of the American Hockey League (AHL). On October 22, 2019, the Griffins assigned Loggins to the Toledo Walleye of the ECHL. In his first full professional season, Loggins recorded two assists in five games for the Griffins, and 11 goals and 14 assists in 45 games for the Walleye.

Following a years hiatus, Loggins spent two seasons abroad with Västerviks IK of the Swedish HockeyAllsvenskan and HC Nové Zámky of the Slovak Extraliga, before returning to North America for the 2024–25 season by signing a contract for the inaugural year of the Tahoe Knight Monsters of the ECHL on August 14, 2024.

== Career statistics ==
			Regular season					Playoffs
Season	Team	League	GP	G	A	Pts	PIM	GP	G	A	Pts	PIM
2014–15	Sioux Falls Stampede	USHL	57	14	21	35	97	12	10	6	16	10
2015–16	Northern Michigan University	WCHA	16	0	3	3	24	—	—	—	—	—
2016–17	Northern Michigan University	WCHA	38	10	6	16	33	—	—	—	—	—
2017–18	Northern Michigan University	WCHA	43	23	24	47	46	—	—	—	—	—
2018–19	Northern Michigan University	WCHA	39	23	17	40	46	—	—	—	—	—
2018–19	Grand Rapids Griffins	AHL	4	1	0	1	0	—	—	—	—	—
2019–20	Grand Rapids Griffins	AHL	5	0	2	2	0	—	—	—	—	—
2019–20	Toledo Walleye	ECHL	45	11	14	25	41	—	—	—	—	—
2020–21	Grand Rapids Griffins	AHL	28	4	3	7	10	—	—	—	—	—
2022–23	Västerviks IK	Allsv	27	9	5	14	6	—	—	—	—	—
2022–23	HC Nové Zámky	Slovak	14	7	1	8	8	5	2	2	4	4
2023–24	HC Nové Zámky	Slovak	38	21	9	30	20	—	—	—	—	—
2024–25	Tahoe Knight Monsters	ECHL	62	19	13	32	23	7	0	0	0	4
2025–26	Tahoe Knight Monsters	ECHL	2	1	0	1	0	—	—	—	—	—
AHL totals			37	5	5	10	10	—	—	—	—	—

== Awards and honors ==
Honors	Year
College
All-WCHA First Team	2018
WCHA Scoring Champion	2019
WCHA Player of the Year	2019
All-WCHA First Team	2019
AHCA West Second-Team All-American	2019

Awards and achievements
Preceded by C. J. Suess	WCHA Player of the Year; 2018–19	Succeeded by Marc Michaelis
