= Muskegon Lumberjacks =

American junior ice hockey team

- City: Muskegon, Michigan
- League: USHL
- Conference: Eastern
- Founded: 2010
- Home arena: Trinity Health Arena
- Colors: Black, Vegas gold, white, crimson
- Owner: Peter Herms
- General manager: Jim McGroarty
- Head coach: Colten St. Clair
- Media: 13 On Your Side, MLive, Sunny 92.5, Local Sports Journal

Franchise history
- 2010–present: Muskegon Lumberjacks

Championships
- Conference titles: 3 (2015, 2025, 2026)
- Playoff championships: 1 Clark Cup (2025)

The Muskegon Lumberjacks are an American junior ice hockey team in the United States Hockey League, based in Muskegon, Michigan, at Trinity Health Arena. The Lumberjacks replaced the International Hockey League franchise (IHL) of the same name, which relocated to Evansville, Indiana, at the end of the 2009–10 IHL season.

== History ==
Lou and Josh Mervis, under a company named Blue Ox Hockey, originally owned the Danville Wings when they promoted that team from the Tier II North American Hockey League to the Tier I United States Hockey League. However, after one season, the Mervis family sold the franchise and it was relocated to become the Indiana Ice in 2004. The Mervis family had purchased the dormant Rochester Mustangs franchise to use as a new USHL team on the University of Illinois campus in Champaign, Illinois, but Josh Mervis agreed to be the general manager of the Ice for the first season in Indiana. After less than one season as general manager of the Ice, Josh Mervis left the team in order to focus on starting the Champaign team. However, the new proposed arena project never took off and the family began to look elsewhere such as La Crosse, Wisconsin, Battle Creek, Michigan, and Louisville, Kentucky.

In February 2010, the USHL approved the Mervis family's plan to reactivate their dormant franchise in of Muskegon for the 2010–11 season. At the time, there was a low-level minor professional hockey team playing in the International Hockey League named the Muskegon Lumberjacks. The Mervis family then acquired the Lumberjacks name and folded the professional team with the new USHL team taking on the Lumberjacks identity that had been used on and off since 1984. The Mervis family retained the former owners of the Lumberjacks, Stacey Patulskey, Jeff Patulskey and Tim Taylor, as the managerial team.

The Lumberjacks had a fairly successful inaugural season. On November 9, 2010, forward Matt Berry registered the first hat trick in team history in a 5–3 win over the Chicago Steel. The Lumberjacks clinched a Clark Cup Playoff berth with a victory over the Steel at the L. C. Walker Arena on April 8. Lumberjacks forwards Ryan Misiak and Matt Berry and defenseman Alexx Privitera were named to the CCM Eastern Conference All-Star team. Misiak led the Jacks in both points and assists with 58 and 43, respectively. Berry led the club with 25 goals. In the playoffs, the fifth-seeded Lumberjacks swept Team USA in the first round best-of-three series, then lost a best-of-five series 1–3 to the Cedar Rapids RoughRiders.

In the 2011–12 season, Muskegon rebounded from an 0–3–0 start by winning six out of seven games from October 30 through November 18. The run put the Lumberjacks at 7–6–0 but a pair of losses to eventual Anderson Cup champion Green Bay Gamblers started a 2–9–2 slump, which led to the dismissal of head coach and general manager Kevin Patrick on January 13. Patrick was replaced by 15-year NHL veteran and 2003 Stanley Cup winner Jim McKenzie. The team would finish last in the Eastern Conference with a 17-35-8 record and miss the playoffs.

In late January 2012, the Lumberjacks hosted the inaugural USHL/NHL Top Prospects Game at L.C. Walker Arena, featuring the league's best talent eligible for the 2012 NHL entry draft. Muskegon was represented by Matt DeBlouw, Mark Yanis and Czech winger Adam Chlapik. Team East beat Team West 5–3 in a game that set a record for event viewership on FastHockey.com; it was called by Lumberjacks' broadcaster Matt Gajtka and Youngstown Phantoms' play-by-play announcer Bart Logan.

The 2012 offseason began on a positive note as five players with Lumberjacks ties were taken in the 2012 NHL Entry Draft. Michigan State recruit Matt DeBlouw was the Lumberjacks' only active player to be drafted; he went to the Calgary Flames in the seventh round. Two Lumberjacks from the team's inaugural USHL season (Brendan Woods – Carolina, Jaycob Megna – Anaheim) and two of Muskegon's future prospects (Adam Gilmour – Minnesota, Doyle Somerby – New York Islanders) were also drafted.

In June 2013, the Mervis family sold the franchise to three former NHL players; brothers Chris and Peter Ferraro and John Vanbiesbrouck.

In 2014–15, the Lumberjacks finished the regular season in fourth place in the Eastern Conference, earning Muskegon a berth in the Clark Cup playoffs. In the first round of the playoffs, Muskegon faced the regular season champion Youngstown Phantoms. Muskegon won game one of the five-game series by a final of 5–4 after Matheson Iacopelli's overtime goal. The Lumberjacks would fall in game two 4–2, leveling the series at one game apiece. In game three, each team managed only one goal through regulation and overtime. Muskegon goaltender Eric Schierhorn, the Lumberjacks' career wins leader, stopped 44 shots in over 90 minutes and Will Graber scored the double-overtime winner for the 2–1 win and series lead. The Lumberjacks won game four and the series. In the Eastern Conference finals, the Lumberjacks faced the Dubuque Fighting Saints, who finished the regular season in third place in the East. The two teams alternated wins in the first four games, setting up a decisive game five at Dubuque. Max Humitz and the Lumberjacks took a 4–1 lead after two periods before giving up two goals to the Fighting Saints in the third to make the score 4–3 with 6:16 to play. However, Schierhorn and the Lumberacks held off Dubuque's comeback and advanced to the Clark Cup Finals for the first time in franchise history. The Lumberjacks were then swept in the finals by the Sioux Falls Stampede.

In August 2015, Dan Israel, a businessman from Bloomfield Hills, Michigan, purchased the team.

In the 2015–16 season, the team was able to tie with the Chicago Steel with 61 points each, landing them in seventh in the Eastern Conference and twelfth overall, but was not good enough to qualify for the playoffs. However, center Rem Pitlick was a bright spot for the team leading the league with 89 points (46 Goals and 43 Assists) in 56 games - a 1.59 points per game average. Pitlick was also the first Lumberjack to win an award as the USHL's 2015–16 Player of the Year and Forward of the Year, and being only the 22nd player to accept both. He was also named CCM Forward of the year, USA Dave Tyler Junior Player of the Year, made the All-USHL first team, named to World Junior A Challenge U.S. Select Team. He was drafted in the third round of the 2016 NHL entry draft by the Nashville Predators.

Following the 2015–16 season, head coach Todd Krygier was fired. On July 13, 2016, the Lumberjacks announced the hire of John LaFontaine The older brother of Hockey Hall of Famer Pat LaFontaine, John was named the North American Hockey League Coach of the Year in 2015–16, leading the Wichita Falls Wildcats to the Robertson Cup Finals.

In 2016–17, the Lumberjacks used their tender to bring Andrei Svechnikov to Muskegon. Svechnikov, along with defenseman Bo Hanson, forward Collin Adams, and goaltenders Keith Petruzzelli and Adam Brizgala, helped the Lumberjacks to the best regular season in their history. Muskegon set team records in wins (37), points (79), goals scored (192) and goals allowed (157). Svechnikov would be named USHL Rookie of the Year after scoring 29 goals and 58 points in 48 games. Petruzzelli would set single-season records for goals against average (2.40), and go on to be drafted by the Detroit Red Wings in the third round of the 2017 NHL draft. Muskegon earned the third seed in the Eastern Conference, but fell to Dubuque in four games. In the playoff series, the Lumberjacks were without Svechnikov and Jachym Kondelik, who were representing their countries internationally. Mikael Hakkarainen and Casey Gilling also missed game four due to injury.

After two seasons as head coach, and the first to lead the Lumberjacks to back-to-back playoff appearances, the Lumberjacks parted with LaFontaine on April 23, 2018, after being eliminated in the first round of the 2018 Clark Cup playoffs. LaFontaine was replaced by assistant coach Mike Hamilton. General manager and part owner John Vanbiesbrouck was also hired by USA Hockey as the assistant executive director of hockey operations and would be involved with selecting players for the US national teams. The Lumberjacks then hired the Chicago Steel's general manager Ryan Bennett for the same position.

In 2024–2025, the Lumberjacks won their first Clark Cup, defeating the Waterloo Black Hawks. With the series tied 2–2, the Lumberjacks won the winner–take–all Game 5, by a score of 4–3 in overtime, in Waterloo, IA. Jack Christ scored the series clinching goal in overtime to complete his hat trick on the night.

== Lumberjacks in the NHL ==
Several Lumberjacks have been selected in the NHL draft. As of 2018, Andrei Svechnikov is the highest-drafted former Lumberjack when he was selected by the Carolina Hurricanes with the second overall pick in the 2018 NHL Draft. Other Lumberjacks to have played in the NHL include Ducks' defenseman Jaycob Megna, Flyers defenseman Nick Seeler, Flames' forward Ryan Lomberg, unrestricted free agent Griffen Molino, and Canucks defenseman Christian Wolanin as of 2018.
