= 2016–17 Denver Pioneers men's ice hockey season =

Collegiate team season

NCAA Division I champion NCHC champion 2017 NCAA Tournament, champion
- Conference: 1st NCHC
- Home ice: Magness Arena

Rankings
- #1: USA Today
- #1: USCHO.com

Record
- Overall: 33–7–4
- Conference: 18–3–3–2
- Home: 16–3–2
- Road: 12–3–2
- Neutral: 5–1–0

Coaches and captains
- Head coach: Jim Montgomery
- Captain: Will Butcher
- Alternate captain(s): Matt VanVoorhis; Matt Marcinew; Evan Janssen

The 2016–17 Denver Pioneers men's ice hockey team represented University of Denver in intercollegiate college ice hockey during the 2016–17 NCAA Division I men's ice hockey season. The head coach was Jim Montgomery and the team captain was Will Butcher. The team won the 2017 NCAA Division I men's ice hockey tournament. The team's leading scorer was Troy Terry.

== Season ==
Denver entered its fourth year under Jim Montgomery looking to continue several trends. The Pioneers had increased their wins and winning percentage over each of the previous two seasons and had yet to miss appearing in the NCAA tournament with Montgomery behind the bench. After a semifinal finish in the 2016 championship DU was projected to be a contender for the 2017 title and was ranked 3rd in the preseason. Denver opened their season as the host for the Ice Breaker Tournament and fell flat on their face, losing both games and finishing last in the four-team tournament.

After that inauspicious beginning the Pioneers collected themselves and played host to #2 Boston University, winning both games. Denver finished out the month with four more wins against weaker teams and moved all the way up to #2 in the nation before their big series in North Dakota against the Fighting Hawks. The Pioneers battled the defending national champions to a 1–1 draw in the first game before losing in the 3–on–3 overtime session (which only gave UND a single point in the NCHC standings) then won a 3–2 defensive struggle in the second game. For their efforts Denver rose to #1 in the country but after tying the lowly Miami RedHawks twice they slipped below conference rival Minnesota–Duluth. Denver held the #2 ranking through a pair of wins against long-time rival Colorado College before meeting UMD for their final weekend before the winter break. In the first game Denver rode a tremendous second period to a 4–3 win but could only manage a single goal in the rematch and lost 1–3, leaving the top two teams ranked exactly where they were before the series.

The Pioneers did not play in a holiday tournament but instead went to Rhode Island for a series against the 2015 champion Providence Friars. Denver got more than it could handle from the Friars, getting a bloody nose from their unranked opponent. The Pioneers returned home for a weekend before hitting the road for two consecutive weeks, splitting both series before returning to Colorado to face #18 Omaha. Despite some of their recent struggles Denver was still ranked #3 in the country and showed just how good they could be by winning every remaining game on their schedule. DU entered its final weekend with the NCHC championship already won and after sweeping Omaha on the road they had the #1 ranking sewn up as well as the best record in the nation.

Denver opened the NCHC Tournament at home against 8-win Colorado College and easily handles the Tigers, winning the two matches by a total score of 8–1 and outshooting their in-state rival 77–39. The Pioneers headed to Minnesota for the semifinal and played North Dakota in front of partisan Fighting Hawk crowd. Despite several close calls Denver was unable to score on UND and the Hawks lone goal served as the game-winner. While the highly anticipated rematch against Minnesota–Duluth never happened, Denver did redeem themselves the next night with a 3–1 win over #8 Western Michigan. Even with their slip up in the semifinal, Denver retained the #1 ranking and went to Cincinnati as the #1 overall seed.

The pioneers opened the 2017 Tournament against WCHA champion Michigan Tech and dominated the Huskies, scoring the first five goals of the game and riding the outburst to a relatively easy 5–2 win. In the Midwest Final Denver met Penn State who, despite being in their first tournament, had won their opening game 10–3. Denver again got an early start, going up 2–0 before the Lions tied the game early in the second period. The DU offense roared a second time in the middle frame with three more goals while Troy Terry finished off his hat trick with an empty net goal in the third.

In the Frozen Four semifinal in Chicago, Denver opened against a surprising Notre Dame squad who were looking for their third consecutive upset but the buzzsaw that was the DU offense cut down the Fighting Irish with the first five goals of the game. Notre Dame was only able to manage 16 shots in the contest and scored a power play goal on their only opportunity of the night. The Pioneers made the championship game and were finally able to play the rubber match against Minnesota–Duluth in front of 19,783 fans. The two teams fought a close first period but neither could manage to score. just under five minutes into the second Jarid Lukosevicius opened the scoring with his 14th of the season and added a second goal 16 seconds later. Duluth cut the lead in half with an Alex Iafallo power play marker a short while later but Lukosevicius completed his hat trick before the end of the period and Denver took a 3–1 lead into the final frame. The Pioneers weathered a furious onslaught by the Bulldogs, with Tanner Jaillet facing 17 shots in the third. Riley Tufte cut the lead to one with just over five minutes remaining but UMD was unable to even the score and Denver skated to its 8th national title. Lukosevicius' hat trick was the first in a title game since 1993 scored by his coach, Jim Montgomery.

Just before the championship game, team captain Will Butcher was announced as the winner of the 2017 Hobey Baker Award joining a slew of other awards by Denver players including the Mike Richter Award (Tanner Jaillet), NCHC Player of the Year (Butcher), NCHC Rookie of the Year (Henrik Borgström), NCHC Goaltender of the Year (Jaillet), NCHC Offensive Defenseman of the Year (Butcher) and the NCAA Tournament Most Outstanding Player Jarid Lukosevicius. Additionally Butcher was named to the All-American First Team while Jaillet made the second team. Both players made the NCHC First Team, Henrik Borgström and Dylan Gambrell each made the conference Second Team while Borgström and Michael Davies both made the All-NCHC Rookie Team.

== Standings ==
2016–17 National Collegiate Hockey Conference standings
	Conference record								Overall record					
	GP	W	L	T	SOW	PTS	GF	GA	GP	W	L	T	GF	GA
#1 Denver†	24	18	3	3	2	59	82	42	44	33	7	4	152	80
#2 Minnesota–Duluth*	24	15	5	4	3	52	83	56	42	28	7	7	140	95
#10 Western Michigan	24	13	9	2	1	42	79	75	40	22	13	5	113	114
#9 North Dakota	24	11	12	1	1	35	69	63	40	21	16	3	127	104
St. Cloud State	24	10	13	1	0	31	64	69	36	16	19	1	105	109
Omaha	24	9	13	2	0	29	74	89	39	17	17	5	122	128
Miami	24	5	14	5	3	23	57	80	36	9	20	7	91	113
Colorado College	24	4	16	4	1	17	43	77	36	8	24	4	70	120
Championship: March 18, 2017 † indicates conference regular season champion; * indicates conference tournament champion Rankings: USCHO.com Top 20 Poll; updated March 6, 2017

== Schedule ==
Date	Time	Opponent^{#}	Rank^{#}	Site	TV	Decision	Result	Attendance	Record
Exhibition
October 1	7:05 pm	Mount Royal*	#3	Magness Arena • Denver, Colorado (Exhibition)	–	Jaillet	W 4–1	3,206	—
Regular Season
Ice Breaker Tournament
October 7	7:35 pm	vs. Ohio State*	#3	Magness Arena • Denver, Colorado (IceBreaker)	–	Jaillet	L 2–3	3,984	0–1–0 (0–0–0)
October 8	7:05 pm	vs. #5 Boston College*	#3	Magness Arena • Denver, Colorado (IceBreaker)	–	Cowley	L 1–3	4,286	0–2–0 (0–0–0)
October 14	7:35 pm	vs. #2 Boston University*	#10	Magness Arena • Denver, Colorado	Altitude	Jaillet	W 4–3	4,686	1–2–0 (0–0–0)
October 15	7:05 pm	vs. #2 Boston University*	#10	Magness Arena • Denver, Colorado	Altitude2	Jaillet	W 3–1	4,876	2–2–0 (0–0–0)
October 21	5:05 pm	at Michigan State*	#6	Munn Ice Arena • East Lansing, Michigan	–	Jaillet	W 2–1	5,419	3–2–0 (0–0–0)
October 22	3:05 pm	at Michigan State*	#6	Munn Ice Arena • East Lansing, Michigan	–	Jaillet	W 3–1	3,003	4–2–0 (0–0–0)
October 28	7:35 pm	at vs. Western Michigan	#3	Magness Arena • Denver, Colorado	–	Jaillet	W 3–1	3,689	5–2–0 (1–0–0)
October 29	7:05 pm	at vs. Western Michigan	#3	Magness Arena • Denver, Colorado	–	Jaillet	W 4–2	3,945	6–2–0 (2–0–0)
November 11	6:37 pm	at #6 North Dakota	#2	Ralph Engelstad Arena • Grand Forks, North Dakota	MidcoSN	Jaillet	T 1–1 ^{3x3 OTL}	11,865	6–2–1 (2–0–1)
November 12	6:05 pm	at #6 North Dakota	#2	Ralph Engelstad Arena • Grand Forks, North Dakota	MidcoSN	Jaillet	W 3–2	11,910	7–2–1 (3–0–1)
November 18	7:35 pm	vs. Miami	#1	Magness Arena • Denver, Colorado	–	Jaillet	T 1–1 ^{SO (1-0 DU)}	5,924	7–2–2 (3–0–2–1)
November 19	7:06 pm	vs. Miami	#1	Magness Arena • Denver, Colorado	–	Jaillet	T 2–2 ^{SO (1-0 DU)}	6,026	7–2–3 (3–0–3–2)
November 25	7:35 pm	at Air Force*	#2	Cadet Ice Arena • Colorado Springs, Colorado	–	Jaillet	W 4–3 ^{OT}	2,742	8–2–3 (3–0–3–2)
November 26	7:05 pm	vs. Wisconsin*	#2	Magness Arena • Denver, Colorado	–	Jaillet	W 6–5	6,026	9–2–3 (3–0–3–2)
December 2	7:37 pm	at Colorado College	#2	World Arena • Colorado Springs, Colorado	–	Jaillet	W 3–1	6,642	10–2–3 (4–0–3–2)
December 3	7:05 pm	vs. Colorado College	#2	Magness Arena • Denver, Colorado	–	Cowley	W 3–1	5,510	11–2–3 (5–0–3–2)
December 9	7:05 pm	vs. #1 Minnesota–Duluth	#2	Magness Arena • Denver, Colorado	ASN	Jaillet	W 4–3	5,870	12–2–3 (6–0–3–2)
December 10	7:05 pm	vs. #1 Minnesota–Duluth	#2	Magness Arena • Denver, Colorado	–	Jaillet	L 1–3	6,186	12–3–3 (6–1–3–2)
December 30	5:05 pm	at Providence*	#2	Schneider Arena • Providence, Rhode Island	–	Jaillet	T 2–2 ^{OT}	2,372	12–3–4 (6–1–3–2)
December 31	3:05 pm	at Providence*	#2	Schneider Arena • Providence, Rhode Island	–	Jaillet	L 1–3	1,976	12–4–4 (6–1–3–2)
January 6	7:35 pm	vs. Arizona State*	#3	Magness Arena • Denver, Colorado	Altitude	Jaillet	W 5–1	5,458	13–4–4 (6–1–3–2)
January 7	7:05 pm	vs. Arizona State*	#3	Magness Arena • Denver, Colorado	–	Cowley	W 6–1	5,980	14–4–4 (6–1–3–2)
January 13	4:35 pm	at #14 Western Michigan	#1	Lawson Arena • Kalamazoo, Michigan	–	Jaillet	L 0–3	3,125	14–5–4 (6–2–3–2)
January 14	5:05 pm	at #14 Western Michigan	#1	Lawson Arena • Kalamazoo, Michigan	–	Jaillet	W 7–2	3,466	15–5–4 (7–2–3–2)
January 20	6:37 pm	at St. Cloud State	#2	Herb Brooks National Hockey Center • St. Cloud, Minnesota	–	Cowley	L 2–3 ^{OT}	4,357	15–6–4 (7–3–3–2)
January 21	6:07 pm	at St. Cloud State	#2	Herb Brooks National Hockey Center • St. Cloud, Minnesota	–	Jaillet	W 3–1	4,645	16–6–4 (8–3–3–2)
January 27	7:35 pm	vs. #18 Omaha	#3	Magness Arena • Denver, Colorado	CBS	Jaillet	W 5–3	5,159	17–6–4 (9–3–3–2)
January 28	7:05 pm	vs. #18 Omaha	#3	Magness Arena • Denver, Colorado	–	Jaillet†	W 5–0	5,602	18–6–4 (10–3–3–2)
February 3	7:35 pm	vs. Colorado College	#2	Magness Arena • Denver, Colorado	–	Jaillet	W 2–1	6,336	19–6–4 (11–3–3–2)
February 4	6:00 pm	at Colorado College	#2	World Arena • Colorado Springs, Colorado	–	Jaillet	W 5–1	7,054	20–6–4 (12–3–3–2)
February 17	5:35 pm	at Miami	#2	Goggin Ice Center • Oxford, Ohio	–	Jaillet	W 5–2	2,402	21–6–4 (13–3–3–2)
February 18	6:05 pm	at Miami	#2	Goggin Ice Center • Oxford, Ohio	ASN	Jaillet	W 5–2	2,764	22–6–4 (14–3–3–2)
February 24	8:05 pm	vs. #18 St. Cloud State	#1	Magness Arena • Denver, Colorado	CBS	Jaillet	W 4–3 ^{OT}	6,102	23–6–4 (15–3–3–2)
February 25	7:05 pm	vs. #18 St. Cloud State	#1	Magness Arena • Denver, Colorado	–	Jaillet	W 7–2	6,227	24–6–4 (16–3–3–2)
March 3	6:37 pm	vs. #14 Omaha	#1	Baxter Arena • Omaha, Nebraska	CBS	Jaillet	W 4–2	5,683	25–6–4 (17–3–3–2)
March 4	6:07 pm	vs. #14 Omaha	#1	Baxter Arena • Omaha, Nebraska	–	Cowley	W 3–0	6,306	26–6–4 (18–3–3–2)
NCHC Tournament
March 10	7:35 pm	vs. Colorado College*	#1	Magness Arena • Denver, Colorado (NCHC Quarterfinal)	–	Jaillet	W 4–1	4,994	27–6–4 (18–3–3–2)
March 11	7:05 pm	vs. Colorado College*	#1	Magness Arena • Denver, Colorado (NCHC Quarterfinal)	–	Cowley	W 4–0	5,899	28–6–4 (18–3–3–2)
March 17	6:30 pm	vs. #11 North Dakota*	#1	Target Center • Minneapolis, Minnesota (NCHC Semifinal)	CBS	Jaillet	L 0–1	8,168	28–7–4 (18–3–3–2)
March 18	2:37 pm	vs. #8 Western Michigan*	#1	Target Center • Minneapolis, Minnesota (NCHC Third Place)	–	Cowley	W 3–1	10,297	29–7–4 (18–3–3–2)
NCAA Division I Tournament
March 24	11:00 pm	vs. #19 Michigan Tech*	#1	U.S. Bank Arena • Cincinnati, Ohio (Midwest Regional semifinal)	ESPNews	Jaillet	W 5–2	3,917	30–7–4 (18–3–3–2)
March 25	4:00 pm	vs. #11 Penn State*	#1	U.S. Bank Arena • Cincinnati, Ohio (Midwest Regional Final)	ESPNU	Jaillet	W 6–3	3,364	31–7–4 (18–3–3–2)
April 6	7:30 pm	vs. #12 Notre Dame*	#1	United Center • Chicago, Illinois (National semifinal)	ESPN2	Jaillet	W 6–1	19,626	32–7–4 (18–3–3–2)
April 8	6:00 pm	vs. #3 Minnesota–Duluth*	#1	United Center • Chicago, Illinois (National championship)	ESPN	Jaillet	W 3–2	19,783	33–7–4 (18–3–3–2)
*Non-conference game. ^{#}Rankings from USCHO.com Poll. All times are in Mountain Time. Source:

† Jailley and Cowley both played in the game and shared the shut out though neither officially receives credit for it.

== Roster and scoring statistics ==
No.	Name	Year	Position	Hometown	S/P/C	Games	Goals	Assists	Points	PIM
19	Troy Terry	Sophomore	RW	Denver, CO	(Colorado)	35	22	23	45	22
5	Henrik Borgström	Freshman	C	Helsinki, FIN	(Finland)	37	22	21	43	16
7	Dylan Gambrell	Sophomore	C	Bonney Lake, WA	(Washington (state))	38	13	29	42	21
4	Will Butcher	Senior	D	Sun Prairie, WI	(Wisconsin)	43	7	30	37	27
14	Jarid Lukosevicius	Sophomore	RW	Squamish, BC	(British Columbia)	43	16	16	32	31
26	Evan Janssen	Senior	LW	Green Bay, WI	(Wisconsin)	42	7	19	26	34
23	Matt Marcinew	Senior	F	Calgary, AB	(Alberta)	44	10	12	22	36
24	Colin Staub	Sophomore	F	Colorado Springs, CO	(Colorado)	44	10	10	20	6
13	Liam Finlay	Freshman	RW	Kelowna, BC	(British Columbia)	38	8	11	19	12
22	Logan O'Connor	Sophomore	RW	Missouri City, TX	(Texas)	44	7	11	18	10
21	Michael Davies	Freshman	D	Kirkwood, MO	(Missouri)	44	3	14	17	20
18	Emil Romig	Senior	W	Vienna, AUT	(Austria)	36	9	6	15	6
28	Adam Plant	Junior	D	Penticton, BC	(British Columbia)	43	3	10	13	45
9	Tyson McLellan	Freshman	C	San Jose, CA	(California)	43	5	7	12	20
15	Evan Ritt	Senior	C	Lakewood, CO	(Colorado)	41	2	10	12	25
3	Tariq Hammond	Junior	D	Calgary, AB	(Alberta)	44	3	6	9	49
25	Blake Hillman	Sophomore	D	Elk River, MN	(Minnesota)	43	1	7	8	18
10	Kevin Conley	Freshman	F	Wausau, WI	(Wisconsin)	28	3	4	7	12
6	Matt VanVoorhis	Senior	D	Edina, MN	(Minnesota)	44	1	3	4	10
2	Erich Fear	Freshman	D	Winnetka, IL	(Illinois)	6	0	1	1	6
31	Evan Cowley	Senior	G	Evergreen, CO	(Colorado)	11	0	1	1	0
27	Sean Mostrom	Sophomore	D	Wayzata, MN	(Minnesota)	1	0	0	0	2
30	Greg Ogard	Senior	G	Wilmette, IL	(Illinois)	2	0	0	0	0
29	Brad Hawkinson	Junior	C	Aurora, CO	(Colorado)	2	0	0	0	0
17	Rudy Junda	Junior	LW	Denver, CO	(Colorado)	9	0	0	0	4
36	Tanner Jaillet	Junior	G	Parksville, BC	(British Columbia)	36	0	0	0	0
Total							152	251	403	432

== Goaltending Statistics ==
No.	Name	Games	Minutes	Wins	Losses	Ties	Goals against	Saves	Shut outs	SV %	GAA
36	Tanner Jaillet	38	2222	28	5	4	68	893	0	.929	1.84
31	Evan Cowley	11	425	5	2	0	8	168	2	.955	1.13
30	Greg Ogard	2	7	0	0	0	0	4	0	1.000	0.00
	open net		24				4				
Total		44	2668	33	7	4	80	1065	3	.930	1.80

== 2017 national championship ==
=== (MW1) Denver vs. (W1) Minnesota–Duluth ===
April 8	Denver	3 – 2	Minnesota–Duluth	United Center

Scoring summary
Period	Team	Goal	Assist(s)	Time	Score
1st	None				
2nd	DEN	Jarid Lukosevicius (14)	Davies and Hillman	24:44	1–0 DU
2nd	DEN	Jarid Lukosevicius (15)	Terry and Davies	5:00	2–0 DU
2nd	UMD	Alex Iafallo (21) – PP	Anderson and Pionk	27:16	2–1 DU
2nd	DEN	Jarid Lukosevicius (16) – GW	Gambrell and Terry	32:23	3–1 DU
3rd	UMD	Riley Tufte (9)	Peterson and Kotyk	54:39	3–2 DU
Penalty summary
Period	Team	Player	Penalty	Time	PIM
1st	UMD	Dan Molenaar	Elbowing	17:32	2:00
2nd	DEN	Matt Marcinew	Hooking	6:44	2:00
2nd	UMD	Willie Rascob	Indirect contact to the head; Elbowing	7:34	2:00

Shots by period
Team	1	2	3	T
Minnesota–Duluth	10	13	17	40
Denver	13	13	3	28

Goaltenders
Team	Name	Saves	Goals against	Time on ice
UMD	Hunter Miska	25	3	58:16
DEN	Tanner Jaillet	38	2	59:56

== See also ==
- 2018 NCAA Division I men's ice hockey tournament
- List of NCAA Division I men's ice hockey tournament champions
