= 2017 NCAA Division I men's ice hockey tournament =

- 2017 Frozen Four logo
- Teams: 16
- Finals site: United Center, Chicago, Illinois
- Champions: Denver Pioneers (8th title)
- Runner-up: Minnesota Duluth Bulldogs (3rd title game)
- Semifinalists: Harvard Crimson (13th Frozen Four); Notre Dame Fighting Irish (3rd Frozen Four)
- Winning coach: Jim Montgomery (1st title)
- MOP: Jarid Lukosevicius (Denver)
- Attendance: 19,783 (Championship); 59,035 (Frozen Four); 119,975 (Tournament)

The 2017 NCAA Division I men's ice hockey tournament was the national championship tournament for men's college ice hockey in the United States, held from March 24 - April 8, 2017. The tournament involved 16 teams in single-elimination play to determine the national champion at the Division I level of the National Collegiate Athletic Association (NCAA), the highest level of competition in college hockey. The tournament's Frozen Four – the semifinals and finals – was hosted by the University of Notre Dame and the Chicago Sports Commission at the United Center in Chicago.

Denver defeated Minnesota-Duluth 3–2 to win the program's 8th NCAA title.

== Tournament procedure ==
2017 Regionals (blue) and Frozen Four (red)

The tournament is composed of four groups of four teams in regional brackets. The four regionals are officially named after their geographic areas. The following were the sites for the 2017 regionals:

March 24–25
East Regional, Dunkin' Donuts Center – Providence, Rhode Island (Host: Brown University)
West Regional, Scheels Arena – Fargo, North Dakota (Host: University of North Dakota)
March 25–26
Northeast Regional, SNHU Arena – Manchester, New Hampshire (Host: University of New Hampshire)
Midwest Regional, US Bank Arena – Cincinnati, Ohio (Host: Miami University)

The winner of each regional advanced to the Frozen Four:

April 6–8
United Center – Chicago, Illinois (Host: University of Notre Dame)

== Qualifying teams ==
The at-large bids and seeding for each team in the tournament were announced on March 19. Hockey East had four teams receive a berth in the tournament, NCHC had four teams receive a berth, ECAC Hockey had three teams receive a berth, Big Ten Conference had three teams receive a berth, and one team from the Atlantic Hockey, and the Western Collegiate Hockey Association (WCHA) received a berth.

East Regional – Providence							West Regional – Fargo						
Seed	School	Conference	Record	Berth type	Appearance	Last bid	Seed	School	Conference	Record	Berth type	Appearance	Last bid
1	Harvard (3)	ECAC	26–5–2	Tournament champion	24th	2016	1	Minnesota-Duluth (2)	NCHC	25–6–7	Tournament champion	11th	2016
2	Western Michigan	NCHC	22–12–5	At-large bid	6th	2012	2	Boston University	Hockey East	23–11–3	At-large bid	35th	2016
3	Air Force	Atlantic Hockey	26–9–5	Tournament champion	6th	2012	3	North Dakota	NCHC	21–15–3	At-large bid	32nd	2016
4	Providence	Hockey East	22–11–5	At-large bid	13th	2016	4	Ohio State	Big Ten	21–11–6	At-large bid	7th	2009
Northeast Regional – Manchester							Midwest Regional – Cincinnati						
Seed	School	Conference	Record	Berth type	Appearance	Last bid	Seed	School	Conference	Record	Berth type	Appearance	Last bid
1	Minnesota (4)	Big Ten	23–11–3	At-large bid	37th	2015	1	Denver (1)	NCHC	29–7–4	At-large bid	27th	2016
2	UMass Lowell	Hockey East	26–10–3	Tournament champion	8th	2016	2	Union	ECAC	25–9–3	At-large bid	5th	2014
3	Cornell	ECAC	19–8–4	At-large bid	20th	2012	3	Penn State	Big Ten	24–11–2	Tournament champion	1st	Never
4	Notre Dame	Hockey East	21–11–5	At-large bid	9th	2016	4	Michigan Tech	WCHA	23–14–7	Tournament champion	12th	2015

Number in parentheses denotes overall seed in the tournament.

== Tournament bracket ==
Regional semifinals March 24–25
1	Denver (1)	5
4	Michigan Tech	2
Cincinnati – Sat/Sun
2	Union	3
3	Penn State	10
1	Minnesota (4)	2
4	Notre Dame	3
Manchester – Sat/Sun
2	UMass Lowell	5
3	Cornell	0
1	Harvard (3)	3
4	Providence	0
Providence – Fri/Sat
2	Western Michigan	4
3	Air Force	5
1	Minnesota–Duluth (2)	3*
4	Ohio State	2
Fargo – Fri/Sat
2	Boston University	4**
3	North Dakota	3

Regional Finals; March 25–26
1	Denver	6
3	Penn State	3
4	Notre Dame	3*
2	UMass-Lowell	2
1	Harvard	3
3	Air Force	2
1	Minnesota-Duluth	3*
2	Boston University	2

Semifinals; April 6
MW1	Denver	6
NE4	Notre Dame	1
E1	Harvard	1
W1	Minnesota-Duluth	2

Championship; April 8
MW1	Denver	3
W1	Minnesota-Duluth	2

Note: * denotes overtime period

== Results ==
=== Midwest Region – Cincinnati, Ohio ===
==== Regional semifinal ====
March 25, 2017; 1:00 pm	(1) Denver	5 – 2 (4–0, 1–2, 0–0)	(4) Michigan Tech	US Bank Arena – Cincinnati, Ohio; Attendance: 3,917

Game reference

Tanner Jaillet
Goalies
Angus Redmond
Referees:
Cameron Lynch
Bob St. Lawrence
Linesmen:
Jason Shattie
Steve Drain

Colin Staub (9) (Plant, Davies) – PP – 04:42	1–0
Colin Staub (10) (Janssen, Davies) – PP – 12:45	2–0
Emil Romig (8) (Ritt) – GW – 14:51	3–0
Will Butcher (7) (Gambrell) – 15:26	4–0
Tyson McLellan (5) (Finlay, Borgström) – 26:26	5–0
	5–1	34:04 – Gavin Gould (12) (Reinke, Hanna)
	5–2	39:55 – Jake Lucchini (11) (Jackson, L'Esperance)

4 min
Penalties
10 min
34
Shots
18

March 25, 2017; 4:30 pm	(2) Union	3 – 10 (2–2, 1–3, 0–5)	(3) Penn State	US Bank Arena – Cincinnati, Ohio; Attendance: 3,917

Game reference

Alex Sakellaropoulos(out 46:00)
Jake Kupsky (in 46:00)
Goalies
Peyton Jones
Referees:
Chris Ciamaga
Ryan Sweeney
Linesmen:
Jared Waite
Joe Sherman

	0–1	11:05 – Brandon Biro (6) (Berger)
Brendan Taylor (2) (Pontarelli, Emelifeonwu) – 12:12	1–1
	1–2	13:26 – Chase Berger (12) (Sturtz)
Spencer Foo (25) (Maier) – 13:50	2–2
	2–3	21:59 – Kris Myllari (8) (Folkes, Richard)
Spencer Foo (26) (Vidmar, Vecchione) – PP – 27:54	3–3
	3–4	29:35 – GW – Chase Berger (13) (Gober, Sturtz)
	3–5	34:13 – Dylan Richard (10) (Myllari, Biro)
	3–6	41:10 – Nate Sucese (16) (Goodwin)
	3–7	46:00 – Denis Smirnov (18) (Sucese)
	3–8	47:52 – PP – Nikita Pavlychev (5) (Goodwin, Myllari)
	3–9	54:58 – SH – Andrew Sturtz (22) (Sucese)
	3–10	57:10 – Nate Sucese (17) (unassisted)

2 min
Penalties
6 min
25
Shots
33

==== Regional Final ====
March 26, 2017; 6:00 pm	(1) Denver	6 – 3 (2–1, 3–1, 1–1)	(3) Penn State	US Bank Arena – Cincinnati, Ohio; Attendance: 3,364

Game reference

Tanner Jaillet
Goalies
Peyton Jones
Referees:
Jamie Koharski
Geoff Miller
Linesmen:
Kevin Briganti
Tommy George

Jarid Lukosevicius (12) (Terry, Gambrell) – 03:17	1–0
Adam Plant (17) (Borgström, Finlay) – 07:19	2–0
	2–1	15:00 – SH – Nikita Pavlychev (6) (DeRosa, Pedrie)
	2–2	22:02 – Denis Smirnov (19) (unassisted)
Troy Terry (20) (Borgström) – PP – 26:30	3–2
Jarid Lukosevicius (13) (Terry, Plant) – GW – 35:40	4–2
Troy Terry (21) (Borgström) – 38:42	5–2
	5–3	52:40 – James Gobetz (1) (Berger, Gober)
Troy Terry (22) (unassisted) – EN – 57:46	6–3

21 min
Penalties
8 min
28
Shots
27

=== West Region – Fargo, North Dakota ===
==== Regional semifinal ====
March 24, 2017; 7:20 pm	(1) Minnesota–Duluth	3 – 2 (OT) (0–0, 2–0, 0–2, 1–0)	(4) Ohio State	Scheels Arena – Fargo, North Dakota; Attendance: 5,219

Game reference

Hunter Miska
Goalies
Matt Tomkins
Referees:
Peter Feola
Chip McDonald
Linesmen:
Ryan Knapp
Jim Briggs

Dominic Toninato (16) (Iafallo, Anderson) – 20:49	1–0
Nick Wolff (2) (Raskob, Tufte) – 33:41	2–0
	2–1	47:09 – Matt Joyaux (3) (Miller, Joshua)
	2–2	52:40 – Gordi Myer (1) (Laczynski)
Willie Raskob (4) (Iafallo, Anderson) – GW – 71:58	3–2

8 min
Penalties
4 min
32
Shots
42

March 24, 2017; 2:00 pm	(2) Boston University	4 – 3 (2OT) (0–1, 1–0, 2–2, 0–0, 1–0)	(3) North Dakota	Scheels Arena – Fargo, North Dakota; Attendance: 5,219

Game reference

Jake Oettinger
Goalies
Cam Johnson
Referees:
Colin Kronforst
Bary Pochmara
Linesmen:
Jonathan Morrison
Nick Bradshaw

	0–1	17:04 – Rhett Gardner (8) (Janatuinen, Boeser)
Doyle Somerby (1) (McAvoy, Curry) – 22:05	1–1
Bobo Carpenter (14) (Keller, Greenway) – 40:28	2–1
Jakob Forsbacka Karlsson (14) (Harper, Roberto) – 44:24	3–1
	3–2	52:14 – Ludvig Hoff (4) (Olson, Bowen)
	3–3	55:34 – Christian Wolanin (7) (Olson, Hoff)
Charlie McAvoy (5) (Keller, Harper) – 91:48	4–3

12 min
Penalties
4 min
29
Shots
59

==== Regional Final ====
March 25, 2017; 5:00 pm	(1) Minnesota–Duluth	3 – 2 (OT) (1–1, 0–0, 1–1, 1–0)	(2) Boston University	Scheels Arena – Fargo, North Dakota; Attendance: 5,277

Game reference

Hunter Miska
Goalies
Jake Oettinger
Referees:
Peter Feola
Chip McDonald
Linesmen:
Ryan Knapp
Jim Briggs

	0–1	07:59 – Clayton Keller (21) (Cloonan)
Alex Iafallo (19) (Anderson, Raskob) – 19:42	1–1
Joey Anderson (11) (Tufte, Wolff) – 51:38	2–1
	2–2	56:47 – Patrick Harper (16) (Krys, Fabbro)
Adam Johnson (18) (Pionk, Iafallo) – GW PP – 61:57	3–2

6 min
Penalties
4 min
23
Shots
24

=== East Region – Providence, Rhode Island ===
==== Regional semifinal ====
March 24, 2017; 4:00 pm	(1) Harvard	3 – 0 (0–0, 2–0, 1–0)	(4) Providence	Dunkin' Donuts Center – Providence, Rhode Island; Attendance: 6,543

Game reference

Merrick Madsen
Goalies
Hayden Hawkey
Referees:
Tony Czech
Chris Perrault
Linesmen:
Eric Froberg
Paul Tunison

Tyler Moy (19) (Kerfoot, Fox) – GW PP – 21:09	1–0
Adam Fox (9) (Donato) – 37:46	2–0
Tyler Moy (20) (unassisted) – EN – 58:09	3–0

8 min
Penalties
8 min
29
Shots
41

March 24, 2017; 7:30 pm	(2) Western Michigan	4 – 5 (1–2, 0–1, 3–2)	(3) Air Force	Dunkin' Donuts Center – Providence, Rhode Island; Attendance: 6,543

Game reference

Ben Blacker
Goalies
Shane Starrett
Referees:
Kevin Shea
Peter Shlittenhardt
Linesmen:
Nick Briganti
Robert Shitani

	0–1	0:56 – Jordan Himley (21) (Koch)
	0–2	11:02 – SH – Kyle Haak (13) (unassisted)
Frederik Tiffels (8) (Muir) – 14:20	1–2
	1–3	25:05 – Kyle Haak (14) (Mackey, Himley)
	1–4	43:58 – PP – Phil Boje (13) (Himley, Koch)
Griffen Molino (15) (Hadley) – 44:48	2–4
Sheldon Dries (16) (Iacopelli, Molino) – 45:11	3–4
	3–5	46:45 – GW – Tyler Ledford (13) (Reid, Baskin)
Frederik Tiffels (9) (McGing, Iacopelli) – EA – 58:01	4–5

23 min
Penalties
4 min
26
Shots
30

==== Regional Final ====
March 25, 2017; 7:30 pm	(1) Harvard	3 – 2 (1–0, 2–2, 0–0)	(3) Air Force	Dunkin' Donuts Center – Providence, Rhode Island; Attendance: 3,708

Game reference

Merrick Madsen
Goalies
Shane Starrett
Referees:
CJ Beaurline
Steve Mcinchak
Linesmen:
Brett Derosiers
Joe Huvtek

Viktor Dombrovskiy (4) (Kerfoot, Zerter-Gossage) – 09:54	1–0
Ryan Donato (21) (Marino, Sherman) – 27:47	2–0
Tyler Moy (21) (Kerfoot, Fox) – GW PP – 29:50	3–0
	3–1	31:23 – EA – Brady Tomlak (5) (Reid, Ledford)
	3–2	31:38 – PP – Jordan Himley (22) (Boje, Haak)

4 min
Penalties
8 min
30
Shots
29

=== Northeast Region – Manchester, New Hampshire ===
==== Regional semifinal ====
March 25, 2017; 3:30 pm	(1) Minnesota	2 – 3 (1–0, 1–2, 0–1)	(4) Notre Dame	SNHU Arena – Manchester, New Hampshire; Attendance: 6,299

Game reference

Eric Schierhorn
Goalies
Cal Petersen
Referees:
Nick Krebsbech
Joe Sullivan
Linesmen:
John Philo
Sterling Egan

Connor Reilly (1) (Gates) – 02:07	1–0
Vinni Lettieri (19) (Cammarata, Bristedt) – PP – 20:30	2–0
	2–1	34:39 – Andrew Oglevie (20) (Petersen)
	2–2	35:33 – Anders Bjork (20) (Evans, Morrison)
	2–3	48:42 – GW PP – Anders Bjork (21) (Evans, Gross)

4 min
Penalties
10 min
33
Shots
29

March 25, 2017; 12:00 pm	(2) Massachusetts–Lowell	5 – 0 (1–0, 2–0, 2–0)	(3) Cornell	SNHU Arena – Manchester, New Hampshire; Attendance: 6,299

Game reference

Tyler Wall
Goalies
Mitch Gillam
Referees:
Gene Binda
Timm Walsh
Linesmen:
TJ Likens
Justin Hills

Ryan Dmowski (8) (Collins) – GW – 06:34	1–0
Ryan Lohin (11) (Kapla) – 26:09	2–0
C. J. Smith (23) (Edwardh, Gambardella) – 36:26	3–0
Ryan Lohin (12) (Zink, Kamrass) – PP – 54:49	4–0
Connor Wilson (6) (Panico, Collins) – PP – 58:12	5–0

6 min
Penalties
11 min
21
Shots
19

==== Regional Final ====
March 26, 2017; 3:30 pm	(2) Massachusetts–Lowell	2 – 3 (OT) (1–1, 0–0, 1–1, 0–1)	(4) Notre Dame	SNHU Arena – Manchester, New Hampshire; Attendance: 4,635

Game reference

Tyler Wall
Goalies
Cal Petersen
Referees:
Gene Binda
Timm Walsh
Linesmen:
TJ Likens
Justin Hills

	0–1	11:49 – Cam Morrison (10) (Bjork)
Ryan Collins (1) (Lohin, Mueller) – 18:58	1–1
John Edwardh (19) (Panico, Mueller) – 51:38	2–1
	2–2	54:43 – Cam Morrison (11) (Bjork, Evans)
	2–3	62:44 – Andrew Oglevie (21) (Bjork, Malmquist)

2 min
Penalties
6 min
29
Shots
28

=== Frozen Four – Chicago, Illinois ===
==== National semifinal ====
April 6, 2017; 8:50 pm ESPN2	(MW1) Denver	6 – 1 (2–0, 3–0, 1–1)	(NE4) Notre Dame	United Center – Chicago, Illinois; Attendance: 19,626

Game reference

Tanner Jaillet
Goalies
Cal Petersen
Referees:
Steve McInchak
CJ Beaurline
Linesmen:
Joe Hutek
Brett DesRosiers

Emil Romig (9) (Staub, Davies) – 08:18	1–0
Henrik Borgström (22) (Butcher, Finlay) – GW – 14:50	2–0
Tariq Hammond (3) (Janssen, O'Connor) – 34:07	3–0
Dylan Gambrell (12) (Hammond, Terry) – 36:27	4–0
Evan Ritt (2) (Staub) – 38:18	5–0
	5–1	51:24 – PP – Cam Morrison (12) (Gross, Evans)
Dylan Gambrell (3) (Terry, Hammond) – 56:42	6–1

2 min
Penalties
4 min
42
Shots
17

April 6, 2017; 5:00 pm ESPN2	(W1) Minnesota–Duluth	2 – 1 (1–1, 0–0, 1–0)	(E1) Harvard	United Center – Chicago, Illinois; Attendance: 19,626

Game reference

Hunter Miska
Goalies
Merrick Madsen
Referees:
Jamie Koharski
Geoff Miller
Linesmen:
Kevin Briganti
Tommy George

	0–1	15:00 – PP – Tyler Moy (22) (Kerfoot, Fox)
Joey Anderson (12) (Toninato) – 18:24	1–1
Alex Iafallo (20) (Raskob, Anderson) – GW – 59:33	2–1

8 min
Penalties
4 min
38
Shots
40

=== National Championship ===
==== (MW1) Denver vs. (W1) Minnesota–Duluth ====
April 8	Denver	3 – 2	Minnesota–Duluth	United Center

Scoring summary
Period	Team	Goal	Assist(s)	Time	Score
1st	None				
2nd	DEN	Jarid Lukosevicius (14)	Davies and Hillman	24:44	1–0 DU
2nd	DEN	Jarid Lukosevicius (15)	Terry and Davies	5:00	2–0 DU
2nd	UMD	Alex Iafallo (21) – PP	Anderson and Pionk	27:16	2–1 DU
2nd	DEN	Jarid Lukosevicius (16) – GW	Gambrell and Terry	32:23	3–1 DU
3rd	UMD	Riley Tufte (9)	Peterson and Kotyk	54:39	3–2 DU
Penalty summary
Period	Team	Player	Penalty	Time	PIM
1st	UMD	Dan Molenaar	Elbowing	17:32	2:00
2nd	DEN	Matt Marcinew	Hooking	6:44	2:00
2nd	UMD	Willie Rascob	Indirect contact to the head; Elbowing	7:34	2:00

Shots by period
Team	1	2	3	T
Minnesota–Duluth	10	13	17	40
Denver	13	13	3	28

Goaltenders
Team	Name	Saves	Goals against	Time on ice
UMD	Hunter Miska	25	3	58:16
DEN	Tanner Jaillet	38	2	59:56

== All-Tournament team ==
=== Frozen Four ===
- G: Tanner Jaillet (Denver)
- D: Will Butcher (Denver)
- D: Neal Pionk (Minnesota-Duluth)
- F: Alex Iafallo (Minnesota-Duluth)
- F: Jarid Lukosevicius* (Denver)
- F: Troy Terry (Denver)

* Most Outstanding Player(s)

== Record by conference ==
Conference	# of Bids	Record	Win %	Regional Finals	Frozen Four	Championship Game	Champions
NCHC	4	7–3	.700	2	2	2	1
Hockey East	4	4–4	.500	3	1	-	-
ECAC Hockey	3	2–3	.400	1	1	-	-
Big Ten	3	1–3	.250	1	-	-	-
Atlantic Hockey	1	1–1	.500	1	-	-	-
WCHA	1	0–1	.000	-	-	-	-

== Media ==
=== Television ===
ESPN had US television rights to all games during the tournament for the thirteenth consecutive year. ESPN aired every game, beginning with the regionals, on ESPN, ESPN2, ESPNews, ESPNU, or ESPN3 and streamed them online via WatchESPN.

In Canada, the tournament was broadcast by TSN and streamed on TSN Go.

==== Broadcast assignments ====
Regionals

- East Regional: John Buccigross, Barry Melrose and Quint Kessenich – Providence, Rhode Island
- West Regional: Clay Matvick and Sean Ritchlin – Fargo, North Dakota
- Northeast Regional: Allen Bestwick and Billy Jaffe – Manchester, New Hampshire
- Midwest Regional: Kevin Brown and Colby Cohen – Cincinnati, Ohio

Frozen Four

- John Buccigross, Barry Melrose and Quint Kessenich – Chicago, Illinois

=== Radio ===
Westwood One has exclusive radio rights to the Frozen Four and will air both the semifinals and the championship.

- Alex Faust, Colby Cohen, & Shireen Saski
