= 2016–17 NCAA Division I men's ice hockey season =

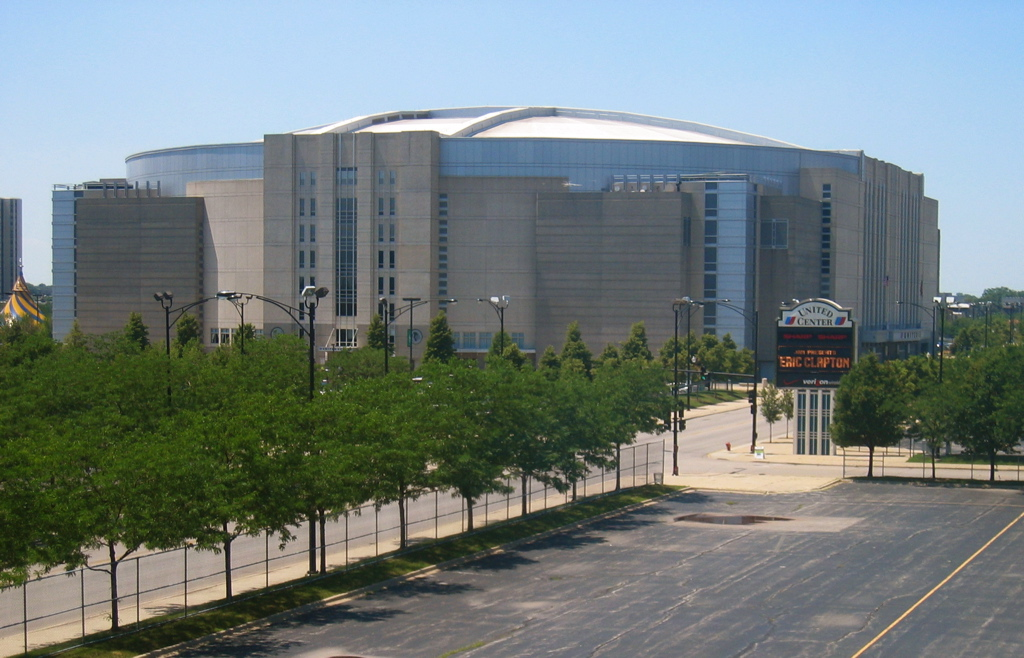
- The United Center in Chicago hosted the 2017 Frozen Four
- Duration: October 1, 2016– April 8, 2017
- NCAA tournament: 2017
- National championship: United Center; Chicago, Illinois
- NCAA champion: Denver
- Hobey Baker Award: Will Butcher (Denver)

The 2016–17 NCAA Division I men's ice hockey season began in October 2016 and ended with the 2017 NCAA Division I men's ice hockey tournament's championship game in April 2017. This was the 70th season in which an NCAA ice hockey championship was held, and the 123rd year overall in which an NCAA school iced a team.

== Regular season ==
=== Standings ===
- 2016–17 Atlantic Hockey standings
  	Conference record							Overall record					
  	GP	W	L	T	PTS	GF	GA	GP	W	L	T	GF	GA
  Canisius†	28	18	4	6	42	90	53	39	21	11	7	107	85
  #12 Air Force*	28	19	6	3	41	91	56	42	27	10	5	133	93
  Army	28	15	10	3	33	77	56	37	18	14	5	100	78
  Robert Morris	28	15	10	3	33	86	73	38	22	12	4	123	95
  Holy Cross	28	11	10	7	29	78	78	36	14	15	7	99	106
  RIT	28	13	15	0	26	90	79	37	14	22	1	108	111
  Mercyhurst	28	11	13	4	26	82	83	39	15	20	4	106	123
  Bentley	28	10	12	6	26	78	82	39	13	19	7	101	120
  Sacred Heart	28	10	15	3	23	67	87	37	13	19	5	88	116
  American International	28	7	14	7	21	63	91	36	8	20	8	82	122
  Niagara	28	3	23	2	8	55	119	39	5	31	3	76	168
  Championship: March 18, 2017 † indicates conference regular season champion; * indicates conference tournament champion Rankings: USCHO.com Top 20 Poll; updated March 6, 2017
- 2016–17 Big Ten ice hockey standings
  	Conference record								Overall record					
  	GP	W	L	T	SOW	PTS	GF	GA	GP	W	L	T	GF	GA
  #7 Minnesota †	20	14	5	1	0	43	79	58	38	23	12	3	141	104
  #17 Wisconsin	20	12	8	0	0	36	72	66	36	20	15	1	122	118
  #14 Ohio State	20	11	8	1	1	35	76	62	39	21	12	6	154	113
  #8 Penn State *	20	10	9	1	0	31	71	63	39	25	12	2	160	108
  Michigan	20	6	12	2	2	22	53	75	35	13	19	3	92	111
  Michigan State	20	3	14	3	0	13	47	74	35	7	24	4	84	134
  Championship: March 18, 2017 † indicates conference regular season champion; * indicates conference tournament champion Rankings: USCHO.com Top 20 Poll; updated March 6, 2017
- 2016–17 NCAA Division I Independent ice hockey standings
  	Overall record					
  	GP	W	L	T	GF	GA
  Arizona State	32	10	19	3	91	130
  Rankings: USCHO.com Top 20 Poll; updated February 20, 2017
- 2016–17 ECAC Hockey men's standings
  	Conference record							Overall record					
  	GP	W	L	T	PTS	GF	GA	GP	W	L	T	GF	GA
  #3 Harvard†*	22	16	4	2	34	85	47	36	28	6	2	146	77
  #11 Union†	22	16	4	2	34	87	56	38	25	10	3	143	113
  #13 Cornell	22	13	4	5	31	70	51	35	21	9	5	99	81
  St. Lawrence	22	12	6	4	28	61	44	37	17	13	7	104	88
  #20 Quinnipiac	22	13	8	1	27	69	55	40	23	15	2	121	101
  Clarkson	22	10	9	3	23	67	62	39	18	16	5	124	112
  Princeton	22	8	11	3	19	63	75	34	15	16	3	103	111
  Yale	22	7	11	4	18	62	67	33	13	15	5	99	98
  Dartmouth	22	7	13	2	16	59	80	31	10	18	3	83	111
  Colgate	22	6	13	3	15	40	62	37	9	22	6	78	113
  Rensselaer	22	6	16	0	12	52	76	37	8	28	1	83	138
  Brown	22	3	18	1	7	47	87	31	4	25	2	66	132
  Championship: March 18, 2017 † indicates conference regular season champion (Cleary Cup) * indicates conference tournament champion (Whitelaw Cup); Rankings: USCHO.com Top 20 Poll; updated March 6, 2017
- 2016–17 Hockey East men's standings
  	Conference record							Overall record					
  	GP	W	L	T	PTS	GF	GA	GP	W	L	T	GF	GA
  #4 Massachusetts–Lowell†*	22	14	7	1	29	76	51	41	27	11	3	151	95
  #6 Boston University†	22	13	6	3	29	64	47	39	24	12	3	123	90
  #16 Boston College†	22	13	6	3	29	74	56	40	21	15	4	132	104
  #5 Notre Dame	22	12	6	4	28	67	51	40	23	12	5	128	93
  #15 Providence	22	12	7	3	27	66	57	39	22	12	5	116	92
  #18 Vermont	22	10	8	4	24	61	63	38	20	13	5	122	106
  Merrimack	22	8	8	6	22	57	60	37	15	16	6	90	96
  Northeastern	22	9	10	3	21	73	71	38	18	15	5	140	113
  Connecticut	22	8	10	4	20	55	61	36	12	16	8	96	104
  New Hampshire	22	7	11	4	18	69	77	40	15	20	5	124	136
  Maine	22	5	15	2	12	57	79	36	11	21	4	102	125
  Massachusetts	22	2	19	1	5	42	88	36	5	29	2	66	132
  Championship: March 18, 2017 † indicates conference regular season champion; * indicates conference tournament champion Rankings: USCHO.com Top 20 Poll; updated March 6, 2017
- 2016–17 National Collegiate Hockey Conference standings
  	Conference record								Overall record					
  	GP	W	L	T	SOW	PTS	GF	GA	GP	W	L	T	GF	GA
  #1 Denver†	24	18	3	3	2	59	82	42	44	33	7	4	152	80
  #2 Minnesota–Duluth*	24	15	5	4	3	52	83	56	42	28	7	7	140	95
  #10 Western Michigan	24	13	9	2	1	42	79	75	40	22	13	5	113	114
  #9 North Dakota	24	11	12	1	1	35	69	63	40	21	16	3	127	104
  St. Cloud State	24	10	13	1	0	31	64	69	36	16	19	1	105	109
  Omaha	24	9	13	2	0	29	74	89	39	17	17	5	122	128
  Miami	24	5	14	5	3	23	57	80	36	9	20	7	91	113
  Colorado College	24	4	16	4	1	17	43	77	36	8	24	4	70	120
  Championship: March 18, 2017 † indicates conference regular season champion; * indicates conference tournament champion Rankings: USCHO.com Top 20 Poll; updated March 6, 2017
- 2016–17 Western Collegiate Hockey Association standings
  	Conference record								Overall record					
  	GP	W	L	T	SOW	PTS	GF	GA	GP	W	L	T	GF	GA
  Bemidji State†	28	20	6	2	2	64	71	44	41	22	16	3	94	79
  #19 Michigan Tech*	28	15	7	6	3	54	80	59	45	23	15	7	131	100
  Minnesota State	28	15	9	4	2	51	89	68	39	22	13	4	119	95
  Bowling Green	28	14	13	1	1	44	79	65	41	21	18	2	120	102
  Ferris State	28	12	12	4	2	42	78	74	37	13	19	5	95	101
  Alaska	28	11	13	4	3	40	67	84	36	12	20	4	79	113
  Lake Superior State	28	8	13	7	4	35	78	87	36	11	18	7	103	119
  Northern Michigan	28	10	15	3	1	34	69	75	39	13	22	4	93	108
  Alabama–Huntsville	28	9	16	3	0	30	68	95	34	9	22	3	74	120
  Alaska Anchorage	28	6	16	6	2	26	52	80	34	7	21	6	59	102
  Championship: March 18, 2017 † indicates conference regular season champion (MacNaughton Cup); * indicates conference tournament champion (Broadmoor Trophy); Rankings: USCHO.com Top 20 Poll; updated March 6, 2017

== 2017 NCAA tournament ==
Regional semifinals
1	Denver	5
4	Michigan Tech	2
Midwest Regional
2	Union	3
3	Penn State	10
1	Minnesota	2
4	Notre Dame	3
Northeast Regional
2	Massachusetts–Lowell	5
3	Cornell	0
1	Harvard	3
4	Providence	1
East Regional
2	Western Michigan	4
3	Air Force	5
1	Minnesota–Duluth	3*
4	Ohio State	2
West Regional
2	Boston University	4**
3	North Dakota	3

Regional Finals
1	Denver	6
3	Penn State	3
4	Notre Dame	3*
2	Massachusetts–Lowell	2
1	Harvard	3
3	Air Force	2
1	Minnesota–Duluth	3*
2	Boston University	2

Frozen Four
MW1	Denver	6
NE4	Notre Dame	1
E1	Harvard	1
W1	Minnesota–Duluth	2

National championship
MW1	Denver	3
W1	Minnesota–Duluth	2

Note: * denotes overtime period(s)

== Player stats ==
=== Scoring leaders ===
GP = Games played; G = Goals; A = Assists; Pts = Points; PIM = Penalty minutes

Player	Class	Team	GP	G	A	Pts	PIM
Zach Aston-Reese	Senior	Northeastern	38	31	32	63	72
Mike Vecchione	Senior	Union	38	29	34	63	45
Tyler Kelleher	Senior	New Hampshire	40	24	39	63	32
Spencer Foo	Junior	Union	38	26	36	62	24
Brady Ferguson	Junior	Robert Morris	38	24	34	58	18
Dylan Sikura	Junior	Northeastern	38	21	36	57	12
Mason Jobst	Sophomore	Ohio State	39	19	36	55	18
Tyler Sheehy	Sophomore	Minnesota	38	20	33	53	20
Adam Gaudette	Sophomore	Northeastern	37	26	26	52	26
Anders Bjork	Junior	Notre Dame	39	21	31	52	16

=== Leading goaltenders ===
The following goaltenders lead the NCAA in goals against average while playing at least 33% of their team's total minutes.

GP = Games played; Min = Minutes played; W = Wins; L = Losses; T = Ties; GA = Goals against; SO = Shutouts; SV% = Save percentage; GAA = Goals against average

Player	Class	Team	GP	Min	W	L	T	GA	SO	SV%	GAA
Michael Bitzer	Junior	Bemidji State	39	2355:22	22	14	3	67	6	.932	1.71
Charles Williams	Senior	Canisius	34	2009:57	21	7	5	61	6	.943	1.82
Tanner Jaillet	Junior	Denver	38	2222:06	28	5	4	68	0	.929	1.84
Angus Redmond	Freshman	Michigan Tech	38	2272:40	22	10	5	70	4	.917	1.85
Shane Starrett	Sophomore	Air Force	37	2142:09	26	6	4	71	5	.925	1.99
Parker Gahagen	Senior	Army	35	2097:45	18	13	4	70	5	.934	2.00
Tyler Wall	Freshman	UMass Lowell	37	2095:00	26	10	1	72	2	.918	2.06
Frank Marotte	Freshman	Robert Morris	29	1559:39	17	8	3	54	2	.931	2.08
Andrew Shortridge	Freshman	Quinnipiac	26	1267:41	13	7	0	44	1	.920	2.08
Merrick Madsen	Junior	Harvard	37	2143:12	28	6	2	75	3	.924	2.10

== Awards ==
=== NCAA ===
Award		Recipient
Hobey Baker Award		Will Butcher, Denver
Spencer T. Penrose Award		Jeff Jackson, Notre Dame
Tim Taylor Award		Clayton Keller, Boston University
Mike Richter Award		Tanner Jaillet, Denver
Derek Hines Unsung Hero Award		Aidan Cavallini, Wisconsin
Lowe's Senior CLASS Award		Brendan Harms, Bemidji State
Tournament Most Outstanding Player		Jarid Lukosevicius, Denver
AHCA All-American Teams
East First Team	Position	West First Team
Charles Williams, Canisius	G	Michael Bitzer, Bemidji State
Adam Fox, Harvard	D	Will Butcher, Denver
Charlie McAvoy, Boston University	D	Tucker Poolman, North Dakota
Zach Aston-Reese, Northeastern	F	Henrik Borgström, Denver
Spencer Foo, Union	F	Alex Iafallo, Minnesota–Duluth
Mike Vecchione, Union	F	Tyler Sheehy, Minnesota
East Second Team	Position	West Second Team
Kyle Hayton, St. Lawrence	G	Tanner Jaillet, Denver
Gavin Bayreuther, St. Lawrence	D	Daniel Brickley, Minnesota State
Jake Walman, Providence	D	Luc Snuggerud, Omaha
Dylan Zink, Massachusetts–Lowell	D	
Anders Bjork, Notre Dame	F	Mason Jobst, Ohio State
Tyler Kelleher, New Hampshire	F	Luke Kunin, Wisconsin
Alexander Kerfoot, Harvard	F	Austin Ortega, Omaha

=== Atlantic Hockey ===
Award		Recipient
Player of the Year		Charles Williams, Canisius
Rookie of the Year		Adam Brubacher, RIT
Best Defensive Forward		Ryan Schmelzer, Canisius
Best Defenseman		Cameron Heath, Canisius
Best Defenseman		Lester Lancaster, Mercyhurst
Individual Sportsmanship		Ryan Nick, Army
Regular Season Scoring Trophy		Brady Ferguson, Robert Morris
Regular Season Goaltending Award		Charles Williams, Canisius
Team Sportsmanship Award		Holy Cross
Coach of the Year		Dave Smith, Canisius
Most Valuable Player in Tournament		Shane Starrett, Air Force
All-Atlantic Hockey Teams
First Team	Position	Second Team
Charles Williams, Canisius	G	Parker Gahagen, Army
Lester Lancaster, Mercyhurst	D	Cameron Heath, Canisius
Phil Boje, Air Force	D	Brady Norrish, RIT
Brady Ferguson, Robert Morris	F	Ryan Schmelzer, Canisius
Max French, Bentley	F	Derek Barach, Mercyhurst
Justin Danforth, Sacred Heart	F	Jordan Himley, Air Force
Third Team	Position	Rookie Team
Shane Starrett, Air Force	G	
Spencer Trapp, Holy Cross	D	
Eric Israel, Robert Morris	D	
Danny Lopez, Holy Cross	F	
Daniel Leavens, Robert Morris	F	
Dylan McLaughlin, Canisius	F	

=== Big Ten ===
Award		Recipient
Player of the Year		Tyler Sheehy, Minnesota
Defensive Player of the Year		Jake Bischoff, Minnesota
Goaltender of the Year		Eric Schierhorn, Minnesota
Freshman of the Year		Trent Frederic, Wisconsin
Scoring Champion		Tyler Sheehy, Minnesota
Scoring Champion		Mason Jobst, Ohio State
Coach of the Year		Tony Granato, Wisconsin
Tournament Most Outstanding Player		Peyton Jones, Penn State
All-Big Ten Teams
First Team	Position	Second Team
Eric Schierhorn, Minnesota	G	Christian Frey, Ohio State
Jake Bischoff, Minnesota	D	Josh Healey, Ohio State
Vince Pedrie, Penn State	D	Jake Linhart, Wisconsin
Justin Kloos, Minnesota	F	Nick Schilkey, Ohio State
Tyler Sheehy, Minnesota	F	Trent Frederic, Wisconsin
Mason Jobst, Ohio State	F	Luke Kunin, Wisconsin
Honorable Mention	Position	Freshman Team
Peyton Jones, Penn State	G	Peyton Jones, Penn State
Jack Berry, Wisconsin	G	
Sam Piazza, Michigan	D	Ryan Lindgren, Minnesota
Carson Gatt, Michigan State	D	Kris Myllari, Penn State
Ryan Lindgren, Minnesota	D	
Peter Tischke, Wisconsin	D	
Vinni Lettieri, Minnesota	F	Rem Pitlick, Minnesota
Dakota Joshua, Ohio State	F	Denis Smirnov, Penn State
David Goodwin, Penn State	F	Trent Frederic, Wisconsin
Denis Smirnov, Penn State	F	

=== ECAC ===
Award		Recipient
Player of the Year		Mike Vecchione, Union
Best Defensive Forward		Jake Weidner, Cornell
Best Defensive Defenseman		James de Haas, Clarkson
Rookie of the Year		Adam Fox, Harvard
Ken Dryden Award		Kyle Hayton, St. Lawrence
Sportmanship Award		
Student-Athlete of the Year		Derek Smith, Quinnipiac
Tim Taylor Award		Rick Bennett, Union
Most Outstanding Player in Tournament		Merrick Madsen, Harvard
All-ECAC Hockey Teams
First Team	Position	Second Team
Kyle Hayton, St. Lawrence	G	Alex Sakellaropoulos, Union
Gavin Bayreuther, St. Lawrence	D	James de Haas, Clarkson
Adam Fox, Harvard	D	Jeff Taylor, Union
Spencer Foo, Union	F	Ryan Donato, Harvard
Alexander Kerfoot, Harvard	F	John Hayden, Yale
Mike Vecchione, Union	F	Max Véronneau, Princeton
Third Team	Position	Rookie Team
Merrick Madsen, Harvard	G	Jake Kielly, Clarkson
Jake Kulevich, Colgate	D	Adam Fox, Harvard
Chase Priskie, Quinnipiac	D	Yanni Kaldis, Cornell
Troy Crema, Dartmouth	F	Jackson Cressey, Princeton
Sam Lafferty, Brown	F	Sheldon Rempal, Clarkson
Sam Vigneault, Clarkson	F	Nico Sturm, Clarkson

=== Hockey East ===
Award		Recipient
Player of the Year		Zach Aston-Reese, Northeastern
Best Defensive Forward		Austin Cangelosi, Boston College
Best Defensive Defenseman		Dennis Gilbert, Notre Dame
Rookie of the Year		Clayton Keller, Boston University
Goaltender of the Year		Collin Delia, Merrimack
Len Ceglarski Sportmanship Award		Joe Gambardella, Massachusetts–Lowell
Three Stars Award		Anders Bjork, Notre Dame
Three Stars Award		Clayton Keller, Boston University
Three Stars Award		Tyler Kelleher, New Hampshire
Scoring Champion		Tyler Kelleher, New Hampshire
Charlie Holt Team Sportsmanship Award		Notre Dame
Bob Kullen Award (Coach of the Year)		Norm Bazin, Massachusetts–Lowell
William Flynn Tournament Most Valuable Player		C.J. Smith, Massachusetts-Lowell
All-Hockey East Teams
First Team	Position	Second Team
Cal Petersen, Notre Dame	G	Jake Oettinger, Boston University
Charlie McAvoy, Boston University	D	Michael Kapla, Massachusetts–Lowell
Jake Walman, Providence	D	Dylan Zink, Massachusetts–Lowell
Zach Aston-Reese, Northeastern	F	Joe Gambardella, Massachusetts–Lowell
Anders Bjork, Notre Dame	F	Clayton Keller, Boston University
Tyler Kelleher, New Hampshire	F	Dylan Sikura, Northeastern
Third Team	Position	Rookie Team
Collin Delia, Merrimack	G	Joseph Woll, Boston College
—	G	Jake Oettinger, Boston University
Dennis Gilbert, Notre Dame	D	Andrew Peeke, Notre Dame
Scott Savage, Boston College	D	—
Austin Cangelosi, Boston College	F	Ross Colton, Vermont
Adam Gaudette, Northeastern	F	Patrick Grasso, New Hampshire
Tage Thompson, Connecticut	F	Patrick Harper, Boston University
—	F	Clayton Keller, Boston University
Honorable Mention	Position	
Joseph Woll, Boston College	G	
Mattias Cleland, New Hampshire	D	
Jordan Gross, Notre Dame	D	
Blain Byron, Maine	F	
C.J. Smith, Massachusetts–Lowell	F	

=== NCHC ===
Award		Recipient
Player of the Year		Will Butcher, Denver
Rookie of the Year		Henrik Borgström, Denver
Goaltender of the Year		Tanner Jaillet, Denver
Forward of the Year		Anthony Louis, Miami
Defensive Defenseman of the Year		Tucker Poolman, North Dakota
Offensive Defenseman of the Year		Will Butcher, Denver
Defensive Forward of the Year		Dominic Toninato, Minnesota–Duluth
Scholar-Athlete of the Year		Justin Parizek, Omaha
Three Stars Award		Ben Blacker, North Dakota
Sportsmanship Award		Matt Hrynkiw, North Dakota
Sportsmanship Award		Tyler Vesel, Omaha
Herb Brooks Coach of the Year		Andy Murray, Western Michigan
Tournament MVP		Alex Iafallo, Minnesota–Duluth
All-NCHC Teams
First Team	Position	Second Team
Tanner Jaillet, Denver	G	Hunter Miska, Minnesota–Duluth
Will Butcher, Denver	D	Neal Pionk, Minnesota–Duluth
Tucker Poolman, North Dakota	D	Luc Snuggerud, Omaha
Alex Iafallo, Minnesota–Duluth	F	Henrik Borgström, Denver
Anthony Louis, Miami	F	Dylan Gambrell, Denver
Austin Ortega, Omaha	F	Sheldon Dries, Western Michigan
Honorable Mention	Position	Rookie Team
Ben Blacker, Western Michigan	G	Ben Blacker, Western Michigan
Louie Belpedio, Miami	D	Jack Ahcan, St. Cloud State
Jimmy Schuldt, St. Cloud State	D	Michael Davies, Denver
Troy Terry, Denver	F	Henrik Borgström, Denver
Shane Gersich, North Dakota	F	Tyson Jost, North Dakota
Mikey Eyssimont, St. Cloud State	F	Joey Anderson, Minnesota–Duluth

=== WCHA ===
Award		Recipient
Player of the Year		Michael Bitzer, Bemidji State
Student-Athlete of the Year		Chad McDonald, Ferris State
Defensive Player of the Year		Daniel Brickley, Minnesota State
Rookie of the Year		Marc Michaelis, Minnesota State
Scoring Champion		Gerald Mayhew, Ferris State
Goaltending Champion		Michael Bitzer, Bemidji State
Coach of the Year		Tom Serratore, Bemidji State
Most Valuable Player in Tournament		Shane Hanna, Michigan Tech
All-WCHA Teams
First Team	Position	Second Team
Michael Bitzer, Bemidji State	G	Atte Tolvanen, Northern Michigan
Daniel Brickley, Minnesota State	D	Shane Hanna, Michigan Tech
Matt Roy, Michigan Tech	D	Sean Walker, Bowling Green
Gerald Mayhew, Ferris State	F	C. J. Franklin, Minnesota State
Mitchell McLain, Bowling Green	F	Mitch Hults, Lake Superior State
Marc Michaelis, Minnesota State	F	Phillip Marinaccio, Bemidji State
	F	Corey Mackin, Ferris State
Third Team	Position	Rookie Team
Justin Kapelmaster, Ferris State	G	Angus Redmond, Michigan Tech
Mark Friedman, Bowling Green	D	Ian Scheid, Minnesota State
Kurt Gosselin, Alabama–Huntsville	D	Alec Rauhauser, Bowling Green
–	D	Mitch Reinke, Michigan Tech
–	D	Zach Whitecloud, Bemidji State
Brad McClure, Minnesota State	F	Marc Michaelis, Minnesota State
Dominik Shine, Northern Michigan	F	Darien Craighead, Northern Michigan
Gerry Fitzgerald, Bemidji State	F	Max Humitz, Lake Superior State
Tyler Heinonen, Michigan Tech	F	–

=== Hobey Baker Award ===
Hobey Baker Award Finalists
Player	Position	School
Zach Aston-Reese	Forward	Northeastern
Michael Bitzer	Goaltender	Bemidji State
Anders Bjork	Forward	Notre Dame
Will Butcher	Defenseman	Denver
Spencer Foo	Forward	Union
Tyler Kelleher	Forward	New Hampshire
Alexander Kerfoot	Forward	Harvard
Tyler Sheehy	Forward	Minnesota
Mike Vecchione	Forward	Union
Charles Williams	Goaltender	Canisius

=== Mike Richter Award ===
Mike Richter Award Finalists
Player	School
Michael Bitzer	Bemidji State
Tanner Jaillet	Denver
Hunter Miska	Minnesota–Duluth
Cal Petersen	Notre Dame
Charles Williams	Canisius

== 2017 NHL entry draft ==
Round	Pick	Player	College	Conference	NHL team
1	4	Cale Makar ^{†}	Massachusetts	Hockey East	Colorado Avalanche
1	8	Casey Mittelstadt ^{†}	Minnesota	Big Ten	Buffalo Sabres
1	19	Josh Norris ^{†}	Michigan	Big Ten	San Jose Sharks
1	25	Ryan Poehling	St. Cloud State	NCHC	Montreal Canadiens
1	26	Jake Oettinger	Boston University	Hockey East	Dallas Stars
1	28	Shane Bowers ^{†}	Boston University	Hockey East	Ottawa Senators
2	43	Dylan Samberg ^{†}	Minnesota–Duluth	NCHC	Winnipeg Jets
2	49	Mario Ferraro ^{†}	Massachusetts	Hockey East	San Jose Sharks
2	52	Luke Martin	Michigan	Big Ten	Carolina Hurricanes
2	57	Ian Mitchell ^{†}	Denver	NCHC	Chicago Blackhawks
2	61	Grant Mismash ^{†}	North Dakota	NCHC	Nashville Predators
3	66	Max Gildon ^{†}	New Hampshire	Hockey East	Florida Panthers
3	71	Kasper Kotkansalo ^{†}	Boston University	Hockey East	Detroit Red Wings
3	74	Johnathan Kovacevic	Merrimack	Hockey East	Winnipeg Jets
3	77	Ben Mirageas ^{†}	Providence	Hockey East	New York Islanders
3	81	Reilly Walsh ^{†}	Harvard	ECAC Hockey	New Jersey Devils
3	82	Cam Crotty ^{†}	Boston University	Hockey East	Arizona Coyotes
3	88	Keith Petruzzelli ^{†}	Quinnipiac	ECAC Hockey	Detroit Red Wings
3	90	Evan Barratt ^{†}	Penn State	Big Ten	Chicago Blackhawks
3	91	Jack Badini ^{†}	Harvard	ECAC Hockey	Anaheim Ducks
3	92	David Farrance ^{†}	Boston University	Hockey East	Nashville Predators
3	93	Clayton Phillips ^{†}	Minnesota	Big Ten	Pittsburgh Penguins
4	95	Jack Rathbone ^{†}	Harvard	ECAC Hockey	Vancouver Canucks
4	99	Jacob Bryson	Providence	Hockey East	Buffalo Sabres
4	102	Scott Reedy ^{†}	Minnesota	Big Ten	San Jose Sharks
4	103	Mikey Anderson ^{†}	Minnesota–Duluth	NCHC	Los Angeles Kings
4	111	Jeremy Swayman ^{†}	Maine	Hockey East	Boston Bruins
4	116	Bryce Misley ^{†}	Vermont	Hockey East	Minnesota Wild
5	126	Michael Karow ^{†}	Boston College	Hockey East	Arizona Coyotes
5	133	Tyler Inamoto ^{†}	Wisconsin	Big Ten	Florida Panthers
5	134	Cole Hults ^{†}	Penn State	Big Ten	Los Angeles Kings
5	137	Noah Cates ^{†}	Minnesota–Duluth	NCHC	Philadelphia Flyers
5	142	Jack Dugan ^{†}	Providence	Hockey East	Vegas Golden Knights
5	144	Parker Foo ^{†}	Union	ECAC Hockey	Chicago Blackhawks
6	156	Denis Smirnov	Penn State	Big Ten	Colorado Avalanche
6	158	Nick Campoli ^{†}	Clarkson	ECAC Hockey	Vegas Golden Knights
6	160	Aarne Talvitie ^{†}	Penn State	Big Ten	New Jersey Devils
6	162	Jack Adams ^{†}	Union	ECAC Hockey	Detroit Red Wings
6	167	Filip Larsson ^{†}	Denver	NCHC	Detroit Red Wings
6	169	Nick Perbix ^{†}	St. Cloud State	NCHC	Tampa Bay Lightning
6	174	Morgan Barron ^{†}	Cornell	ECAC Hockey	New York Rangers
6	177	Skyler Brind'Amour ^{†}	Quinnipiac	ECAC Hockey	Edmonton Oilers
6	179	Carson Meyer	Miami	NCHC	Columbus Blue Jackets
6	180	Cole Guttman ^{†}	Denver	NCHC	Tampa Bay Lightning
6	182	Benton Maass ^{†}	New Hampshire	Hockey East	Washington Capitals
7	187	Nick Leivermann ^{†}	Notre Dame	Hockey East	Colorado Avalanche
7	192	Linus Weissbach ^{†}	Wisconsin	Big Ten	Buffalo Sabres
7	196	Wyatt Kalynuk ^{†}	Wisconsin	Big Ten	Philadelphia Flyers
7	199	Cayden Primeau ^{†}	Northeastern	Hockey East	Montreal Canadiens
7	200	Sammy Walker ^{†}	Minnesota	Big Ten	Tampa Bay Lightning
7	201	Logan Cockerill ^{†}	Boston University	Hockey East	New York Islanders
7	203	Ryan O'Connell ^{†}	Ohio State	Big Ten	Toronto Maple Leafs
7	208	Philip Kemp ^{†}	Yale	ECAC Hockey	Edmonton Oilers
7	209	Nick Swaney ^{†}	Minnesota–Duluth	NCHC	Minnesota Wild
7	210	Robbie Stucker ^{†}	Minnesota	Big Ten	Columbus Blue Jackets
7	211	Croix Evingson ^{†}	Massachusetts–Lowell	Hockey East	Winnipeg Jets
7	214	Matt Hellickson ^{†}	Notre Dame	Hockey East	New Jersey Devils
7	215	Joshua Ess ^{†}	Wisconsin	Big Ten	Chicago Blackhawks
7	217	Will Reilly ^{†}	Rensselaer	ECAC Hockey	Pittsburgh Penguins

† incoming freshman

== See also ==
- 2016–17 NCAA Division II men's ice hockey season
- 2016–17 NCAA Division III men's ice hockey season
