= Neal Pionk =

American ice hockey player (born 1995)

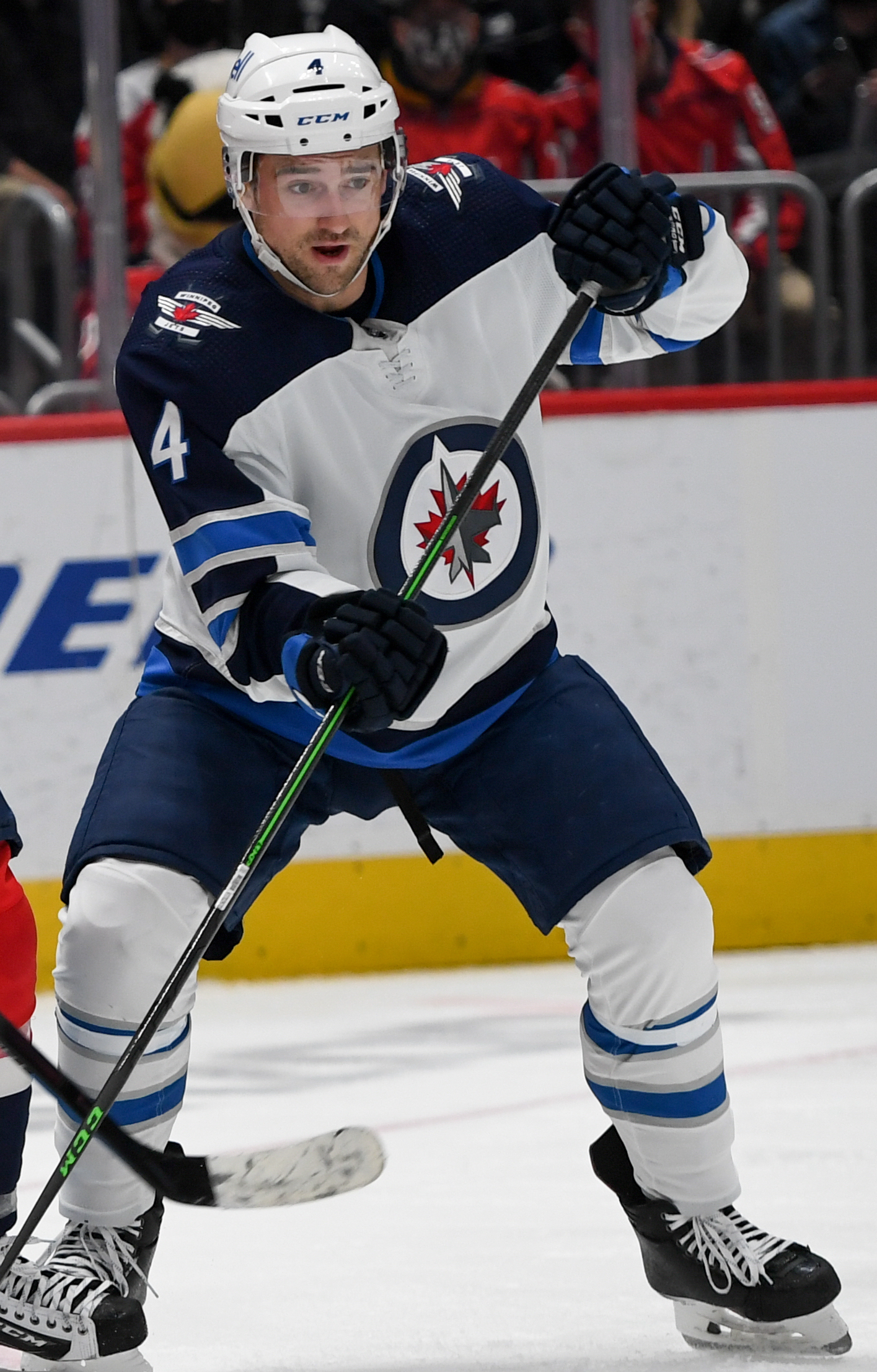
- Pionk with the Winnipeg Jets in 2022
- Born: July 29, 1995 (age 31) Omaha, Nebraska, U.S.
- Height: 6 ft 0 in (183 cm)
- Weight: 186 lb (84 kg; 13 st 4 lb)
- Position: Defense
- Shoots: Right
- NHL team Former teams: Winnipeg Jets; New York Rangers
- National team: United States
- NHL draft: Undrafted
- Playing career: 2017–present

Neal Robert Pionk (born July 29, 1995) is an American professional ice hockey player who is a defenseman for the Winnipeg Jets of the National Hockey League (NHL). An undrafted player, Pionk was signed by the New York Rangers as a college free agent from the University of Minnesota Duluth in 2017.

== Early life ==
Pionk was born on July 29, 1995, in Omaha, Nebraska, to parents Karen and Scott Pionk. His father played baseball for Proctor High School and the University of Wisconsin–Superior before coaching ice hockey at the youth level and for the United States Hockey League (USHL). Pionk was raised in Hermantown, Minnesota, a suburb of Duluth, where his father built a baseball diamond and an ice hockey rink for Pionk and his friends to practice. All five Pionk brothers played baseball and ice hockey as children, and after school they would play two-on-two hockey in this backyard ice rink. In his adolescence, Pionk played with future Winnipeg Jets teammate and defensive partner Dylan Samberg on youth teams and for Hermantown High School. Pionk and his brothers also created an annual pick-up hockey tradition with fellow brothers Travis and Cole Koepke, the latter joining Pionk on the Winnipeg Jets in the 2025-26 NHL season. They referred to this annual tournament as the Holiday Cup. In his final season for Hermantown, Pionk scored 14 goals and 29 points in 25 games.

== Playing career ==
=== USHL ===
The Sioux City Musketeers selected Pionk in the fifth round, 66th overall, of the 2012 USHL Draft. Immediately after taking Hermantown to a state championship title in 2013, Pionk left the school to begin his junior ice hockey career in Sioux City. He played 12 games for the Musketeers during their 2012–13 season, recording one goal and six points in the process. The next season, he recorded two goals and 23 points in 54 regular season games for the Musketeers. Sioux City advanced to the Western Conference Finals of the 2014 USHL championships, where they were swept by the Waterloo Black Hawks. Overlooked in the 2014 NHL Draft, Pionk served as captain of the Musketeers for the 2014–15 season. With seven goals and 41 assists in 53 regular season games, Pionk led all USHL defensemen in scoring, and he was named the USHL Defenseman of the Year at the end of the season. The Musketeers were eliminated by the Sioux Falls Stampede in a five-game Western Conference Semifinal series that postseason. In 119 career games for Sioux City, Pionk recorded 10 goals, 77 points, a +44 plus–minus rating, and 199 penalty minutes.

=== College ===
Pionk committed to play college ice hockey for the Minnesota Duluth Bulldogs in 2012, and he signed a National Letter of Intent in 2014 to join Duluth for their 2015–16 season. On October 24, 2015, Pionk scored the first goal of his collegiate career, the game-tying point in a 3–3 overtime draw against Notre Dame. After recording two points, two blocked shots, and a +2 rating in the two-game Notre Dame series, the National Collegiate Hockey Conference (NCHC) named Pionk their Defensive Player of the Week. Pionk received weekly honors again on March 7 after generating a team-high three points and four blocked shots in a two-game sweep of Miami University. Appearing in all 40 games for Duluth during his freshman season, Pionk recorded four goals and 17 points, and the Bulldogs named him the Jerry Chumola Rookie of the Year. At the end of the 2015–16 season, all Duluth freshmen, including Pionk, were named to the NCHC All-Academic Team.

After recording a goal and an assist in a two-game series against the UMass Lowell River Hawks, Pionk began the 2016–17 season as the NCHC Defenseman of the Week for the week ending October 10. He received the award again on December 12 after recording three points, six blocked shots, and a +2 rating against the Denver Pioneers. His third weekly honor of the season came on February 6, 2017, after a three-point weekend against Omaha. With seven goals and 28 points in the regular 2016–17 season, Pionk was named to both the All-NCHC Second Team and the All-USCHO Third Team as a sophomore. In the postseason, Pionk and the Bulldogs defeated the North Dakota Fighting Hawks 4–3 to capture the 2017 NCHC Tournament championship, their first conference championship since 2009. Pionk was one of four Duluth players named to the Frozen Faceoff All-Tournament Team that year. The Bulldogs then advanced to the 2017 NCAA Division I Men's Ice Hockey Tournament, where they fell 3–2 to Denver in the national championship. Pionk added another six points in eight postseason games, and he was named to the NCAA Division I Men's Ice Hockey All-Tournament Team.

After Duluth's loss to Denver in the NCAA tournament finals, Pionk announced that he would forfeit his final two seasons of college hockey eligibility in order to begin a professional career. He finished his career in Duluth with 11 goals, 51 points, and a +35 rating in 82 games.

=== Professional ===
==== New York Rangers ====
On May 1, 2017, Pionk signed a two-year, $3.55 million contract with the New York Rangers of the NHL. After attending training camp with New York, Pionk was assigned to the Hartford Wolf Pack of the American Hockey League (AHL) to begin the 2017–18 season. He made his professional hockey debut on October 6, 2017, against the Charlotte Checkers, and recorded his first point two days later against the Lehigh Valley Phantoms. After recording one goal and 17 points in 48 games, Pionk was promoted to the Rangers on February 8, 2018. He made his NHL debut the next night, blocking three shots in a 4-3 victory over the Calgary Flames. Pionk scored his first NHL goal on March 24 against the Buffalo Sabres, the culmination of a stretch of 13 points in 12 games. Despite playing on a team that struggled defensively throughout the 2017–18 season, Pionk finished his rookie year with 14 points in 28 games, and he received frequent playing time down the final stretch of the season.

Pionk joined the Rangers full-time during the 2018–19 season. He recorded six goals and 26 points in 73 games, leading all Rangers' defencemen with 13 power play points.

==== Winnipeg Jets ====
On June 17, 2019, Pionk and a 2019 first-round pick were traded to the Winnipeg Jets in exchange for Jacob Trouba. The first-round pick originally belonged to the Jets. On July 21, the Jets signed Pionk to a two-year, $6 million contract extension.

On August 11, 2021, Pionk signed a four-year, $23.5 million contract with the Jets.

Coming off the 2024-25 season where Pionk had 39 points in 69 games and helped the Winnipeg Jets win the President's Trophy, he signed a 6-year, $42 million contract extension with the Jets.

== International play ==
Medal record

Representing United States

Men's ice hockey

World Championships
Bronze medal – third place	2018 Denmark	

As a citizen of the United States, Pionk has represented his home country at both the junior and senior levels. He first represented Team USA at the 2013 World Junior A Challenge where he helped them earn a gold medal and was named to the Tournament All-Star Team. Following this, Pionk never represented Team USA again until 2018, when he along with teammate Chris Kreider, were the only Rangers players selected to represent the United States at the 2018 IIHF World Championship. During the tournament, Pionk recorded three points through 10 games to win a bronze medal.

== Career statistics ==
=== Regular season and playoffs ===
			Regular season					Playoffs
Season	Team	League	GP	G	A	Pts	PIM	GP	G	A	Pts	PIM
2011–12	Hermantown High School	HSMN	25	7	6	13	12	3	0	3	3	2
2012–13	Hermantown High School	HSMN	25	14	15	29	25	3	2	3	5	2
2012–13	Sioux City Musketeers	USHL	12	1	5	6	2	—	—	—	—	—
2013–14	Sioux City Musketeers	USHL	54	2	21	23	93	7	0	1	1	10
2014–15	Sioux City Musketeers	USHL	53	7	41	48	104	5	0	1	1	10
2015–16	University of Minnesota Duluth	NCHC	40	4	13	17	44	—	—	—	—	—
2016–17	University of Minnesota Duluth	NCHC	42	7	27	34	25	—	—	—	—	—
2017–18	Hartford Wolf Pack	AHL	48	1	16	17	20	—	—	—	—	—
2017–18	New York Rangers	NHL	28	1	13	14	12	—	—	—	—	—
2018–19	New York Rangers	NHL	73	6	20	26	35	—	—	—	—	—
2019–20	Winnipeg Jets	NHL	71	6	39	45	32	4	0	2	2	0
2020–21	Winnipeg Jets	NHL	54	3	29	32	20	8	0	4	4	2
2021–22	Winnipeg Jets	NHL	77	3	31	34	46	—	—	—	—	—
2022–23	Winnipeg Jets	NHL	82	10	23	33	44	5	0	7	7	0
2023–24	Winnipeg Jets	NHL	82	5	28	33	63	5	0	1	1	4
2024–25	Winnipeg Jets	NHL	69	10	29	39	44	13	1	6	7	14
2025–26	Winnipeg Jets	NHL	51	3	9	12	37	—	—	—	—	—
NHL totals			587	47	221	268	333	35	1	20	21	20

=== International ===
Year	Team	Event	Result	GP	G	A	Pts	PIM
2018	United States	WC	3rd place, bronze medalist(s)	10	2	1	3	4
Senior totals				10	2	1	3	4

== Awards and honours ==
Award	Year
USHL
First All-Star Team	2015
Defenseman of the Year	2015
College
NCHC All-Tournament Team	2017
NCAA All-Tournament Team	2017
NCHC Second All-Star Team	2017
