= Troy Terry =

American ice hockey player (born 1997)

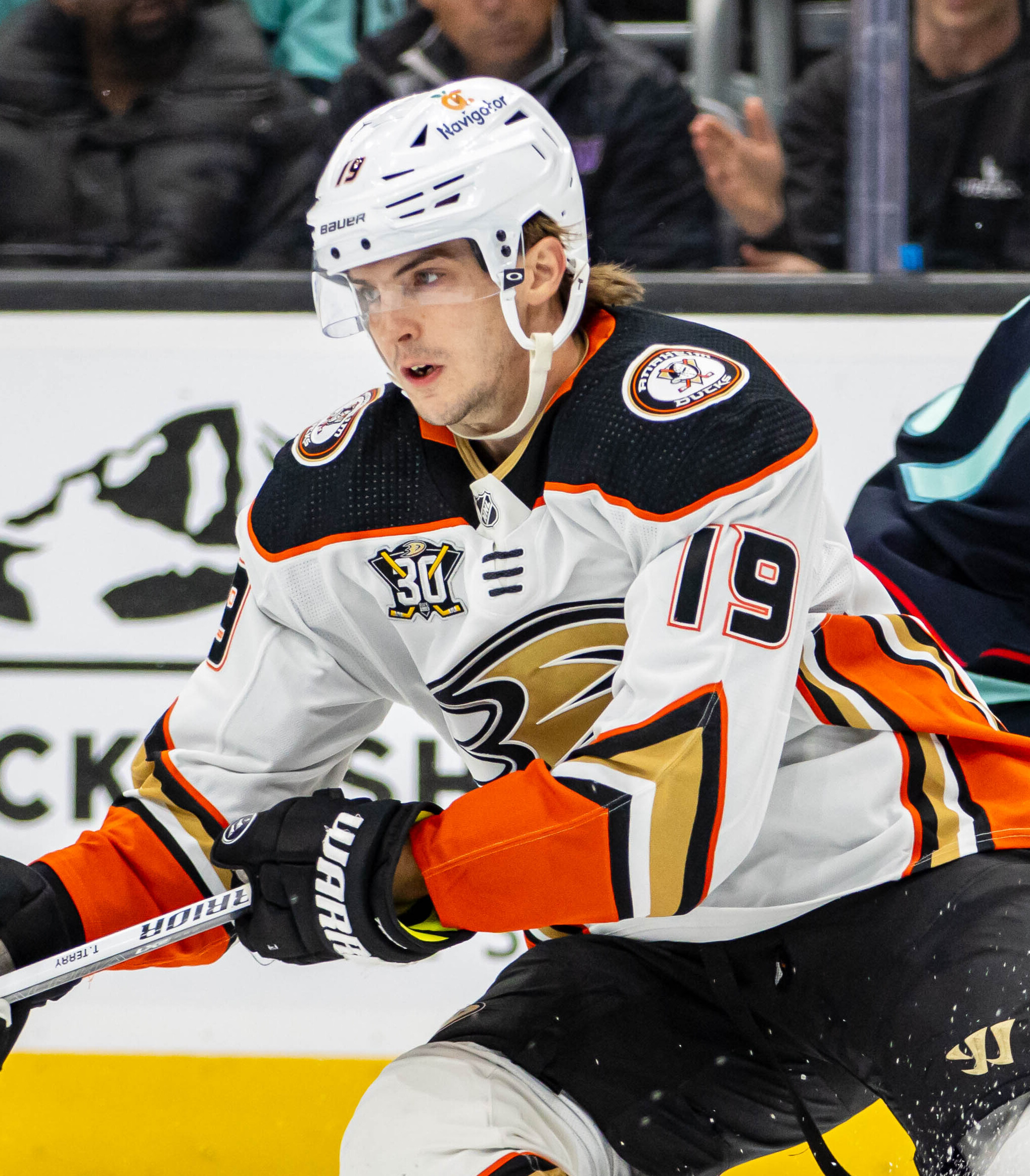
- Terry with Anaheim Ducks in 2024
- Born: September 10, 1997 (age 29) Denver, Colorado, U.S.
- Height: 6 ft 1 in (185 cm)
- Weight: 175 lb (79 kg; 12 st 7 lb)
- Position: Right wing
- Shoots: Right
- NHL team: Anaheim Ducks
- National team: United States
- NHL draft: 148th overall, 2015; Anaheim Ducks
- Playing career: 2018–present

Troy Nathan Terry (born September 10, 1997) is an American professional ice hockey player who is a right winger and alternate captain for the Anaheim Ducks of the National Hockey League (NHL). Terry was drafted by the Ducks at the 2015 NHL entry draft, in the fifth round, 148th overall.

A native of Denver, Terry played with the Colorado Thunderbirds under-16 team at the Tier 1 Elite Hockey League from 2008 until 2014. He eventually left the Thunderbirds to play in the United States Hockey League (USHL) with the USA Hockey National Team Development Program (NTDP).

== Early life ==
Terry was born on September 10, 1997, in Denver, to parents Susan and Chuck Terry. As his father was a high school quarterback who walked on at Arizona State University, Troy was named after quarterback Troy Aikman. Terry grew up in the Highlands Ranch suburb of Denver with his younger brother Trent.

Terry started playing hockey at four years old and was skating with an older age group by the age of six. He earned various nicknames throughout his mini mite career including "Coach Troy" and "Two and a Half Men", due to his size. During the 2004–05 NHL lockout, Colorado Avalanche Center and team captain Joe Sakic coached Terry's hockey team. As his coach, Sakic was impressed by Terry's puckhandling skills saying he could "stick-handle in a phone booth". Terry was originally inspired to play goaltender by Patrick Roy but, as he started shooting pucks while waiting for his turn in net, eventually turned to center.

== Playing career ==
=== Amateur ===
A native of Denver, Colorado, Terry played with the Littleton Hawks as a Mite and eventually played with the Colorado Thunderbirds AAA organization in the Tier 1 Elite Hockey League from 2010 until 2014. During this time, he was named to Team USA Under-17 Select Tournament Team for the 2013 U17 Five Nations Tournament in Trnava, Slovakia. He eventually left the Thunderbirds to play in the United States Hockey League (USHL) with the USA Hockey National Team Development Program (NTDP). Although he was offered a position in 2013, Terry chose to wait another year to gain weight and height.

Terry transferred from Rock Canyon High School to Pioneer High School during his one season with the U.S. under-18 team and graduated high school within three years. He was recruited to play for the Denver Pioneers by coach George Gwozdecky and retained his recruitment in spite of Gwozdecky's firing. Due to his accelerated high school career, Terry became one of college hockey’s youngest players as a freshman.

=== Collegiate ===
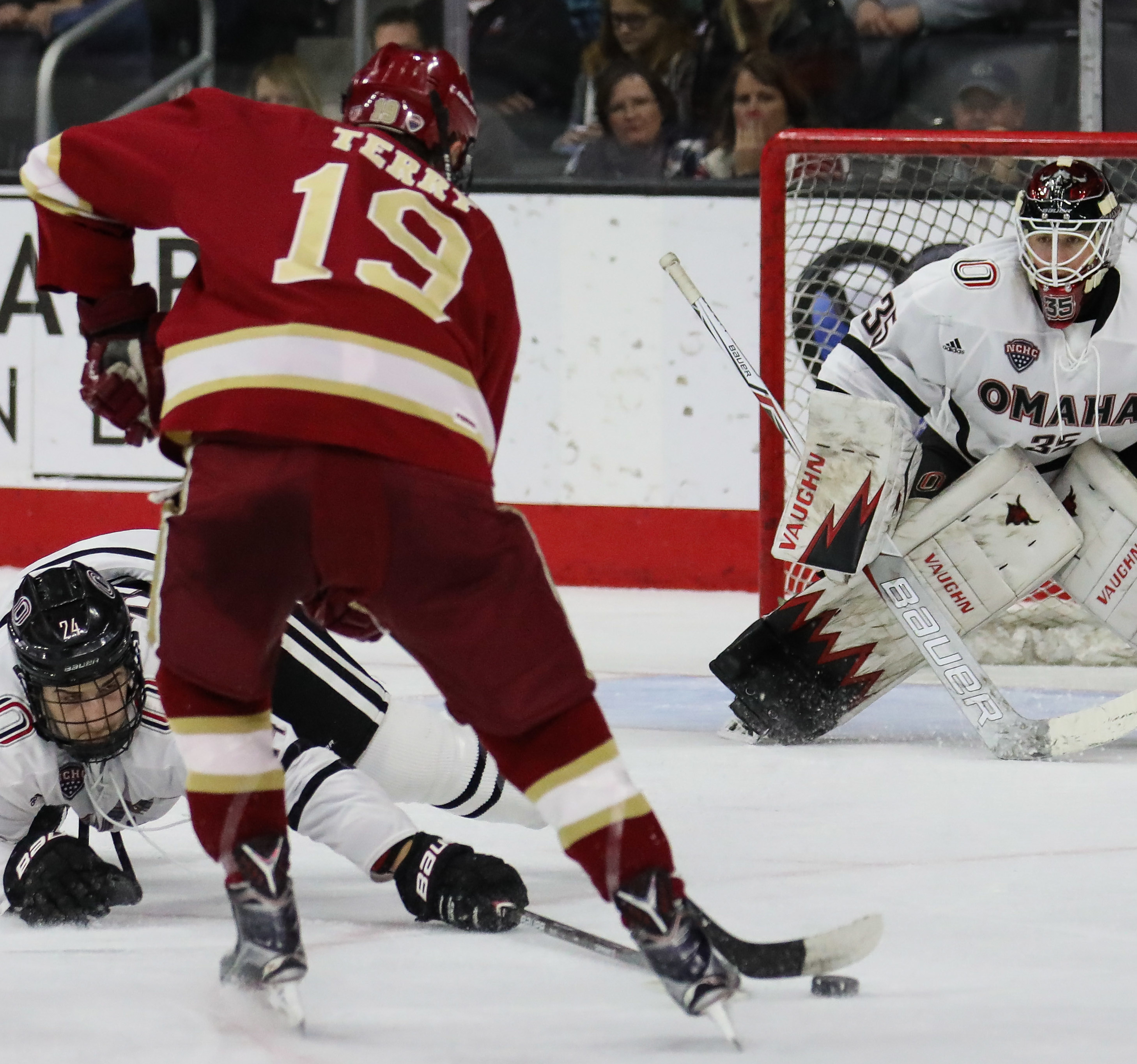
Terry with Denver in 2017

During his freshman and sophomore season at Denver, Terry worked with the Pioneer's head strength and conditioning coach to be more of an impactful player on the ice. He changed his diet and increased his weight training to become "a dominant player every shift" as a junior. In spite of his size, Terry was drafted in the fifth round, 148th overall, by the Anaheim Ducks in the 2015 NHL entry draft. During his freshman season, the Pioneers made it to the Frozen Four of the NCAA Tournament but fell to the eventual champions, North Dakota. The following year, he helped lead the Denver Pioneers to the 2017 NCAA Championship.

Upon the completion of his junior season with the Pioneers in the 2017–18 season, having continued to increase his offensive output for the third successive season with 48 points in 39 games, Terry concluded his collegiate career in agreeing to a three-year, entry-level contract with the Anaheim Ducks on March 27, 2018. He was later named the NCHC player of the month, as well as a First-Team West All-American.

=== Professional ===
Terry was immediately added to the Ducks' roster for their postseason push, and made his NHL debut the same day in a 4–1 loss to the Vancouver Canucks at Rogers Arena. In his debut, Terry skated on the Ducks' third line with Adam Henrique and Ondrej Kase and registered two shots on goal in 12:30 minutes of ice time. He played one more game with the Ducks before they were eliminated from playoff contention. He returned to the team for their 2018 Training Camp and was named to their opening night roster for the 2018–19 season.

Terry played six games with the Ducks to begin the season, going scoreless in all but one game, before being re-assigned to the Ducks' American Hockey League (AHL) affiliate, the San Diego Gulls. He made his AHL debut on October 19, 2018, scoring two goals and three points, including the game-winning assist. Following his debut, Terry went on an 11-game point streak to begin his career recording a total of 16 points. Throughout this time, he tied a Gulls rookie record for recording an assist in his first six pro games and set a new franchise record for the most consecutive goals by a rookie. As a result of his achievements, Terry was named to the AHL All-Star Game as part of the Pacific Division roster. At the time of his selection, he was tied for first amongst all AHL rookies in scoring, assists, and game-winning goals within 27 games. He spent the remainder of the season alternating between the Gulls and the Ducks.

The following season, Terry recorded 15 points in 47 games before the NHL season was paused due to the COVID-19 pandemic. During the season, he had missed six weeks after breaking a bone below his kneecap in a game against the Philadelphia Flyers and spent a few games with the Gulls on a conditioning stint. On July 14, 2020, as a restricted free agent, Terry was signed by the Anaheim Ducks to a three-year, $4.35 million contract extension.

When the NHL returned for the 2020–21 season, Terry remained on the Ducks' roster prior to their opening night game. After recording four goals and three assists through 21 games, rumors began arising that Terry might be traded prior to the NHL Trade Deadline. However, he remained on the team and set a new career-high in goals and points while also logging an average of 14:22 of ice time.

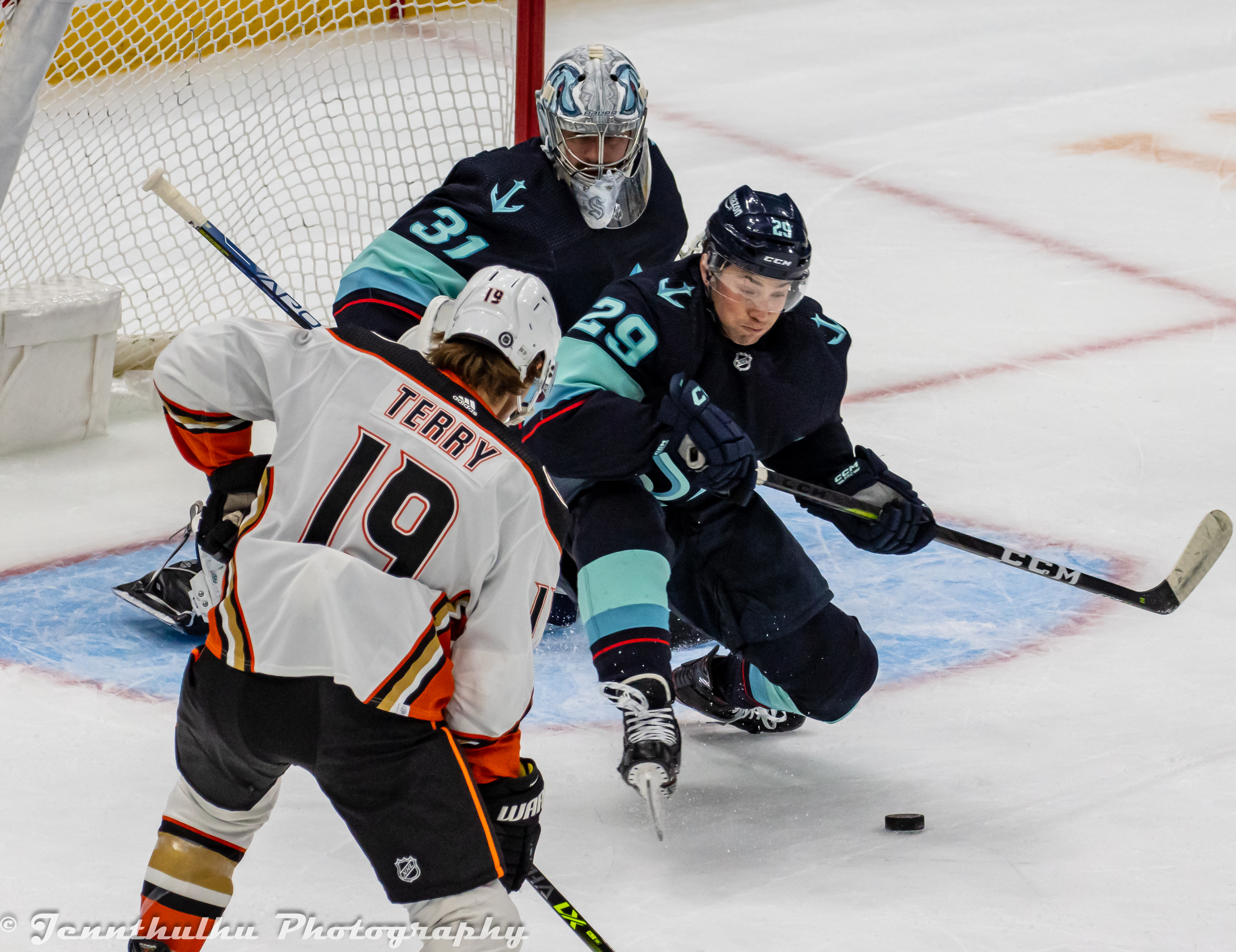
Terry during a game against the Seattle Kraken in 2023.

Terry began the 2021–22 season strong, setting a personal and franchise-record within the first two months. On November 15, 2021, Terry was named the NHL's Third Star of the Week after recording his first career overtime goal and his third career multi-goal and three-point performance. Following this, Terry became the youngest Duck in franchise history to record a point streak of at least 15 games. On January 4, 2022, in a 4–1 win against the Philadelphia Flyers, Terry recorded his first career NHL hat-trick. A few weeks later, he was voted into the NHL All-Star Game for the first time in his career. At the time of his selection, Terry had 22 goals and 14 assists for 36 points in 38 contests played.

During the offseason, Terry agreed to a new 7-year contract extension with the Ducks worth $49 million with an average annual value (AAV) worth $7 million per season, that will keep Terry with the Ducks until the 2029–30 NHL season.

== International play ==
Terry has represented the United States at both the junior and senior levels of international play. His first international tournament for Team USA was during the 2014 Hlinka Gretzky Cup. The following year, Terry helped Team USA compete for a gold medal at the 2015 IIHF World U18 Championships after scoring 3 goals on 3 attempts in the shootout to eliminate Russia in the tournament. This was the first time Team USA had won against Russia in the medal round of the World Junior championship. He again helped lead Team USA to a gold medal during the 2017 World Junior Ice Hockey Championships after scoring the game-winning goal in shootout, again, against Team Canada.

As the NHL refused to allow their players to compete at the 2018 Winter Olympics, Terry and other collegiate athletes were chosen to play for the United States men's ice hockey team. During Team USA's game against Slovakia, he recorded three assists in the eventual 5–1 win.

== Career statistics ==
=== Regular season and playoffs ===
			Regular season					Playoffs
Season	Team	League	GP	G	A	Pts	PIM	GP	G	A	Pts	PIM
2012–13	Colorado Thunderbirds 16U AAA	T1EHL	41	14	35	49	6	2	0	0	0	0
2013–14	Colorado Thunderbirds 16U AAA	T1EHL	31	16	25	41	0	—	—	—	—	—
2013–14	Indiana Ice	USHL	1	0	0	0	0	—	—	—	—	—
2014–15	U.S. NTDP Juniors	USHL	25	6	8	14	4	—	—	—	—	—
2014–15	U.S. NTDP U18	USDP	66	19	25	44	8	—	—	—	—	—
2015–16	University of Denver	NCHC	41	9	13	22	8	—	—	—	—	—
2016–17	University of Denver	NCHC	35	22	23	45	22	—	—	—	—	—
2017–18	University of Denver	NCHC	39	14	34	48	6	—	—	—	—	—
2017–18	Anaheim Ducks	NHL	2	0	0	0	0	—	—	—	—	—
2018–19	Anaheim Ducks	NHL	32	4	9	13	2	—	—	—	—	—
2018–19	San Diego Gulls	AHL	41	16	25	41	4	—	—	—	—	—
2019–20	Anaheim Ducks	NHL	47	4	11	15	6	—	—	—	—	—
2019–20	San Diego Gulls	AHL	14	7	9	16	6	—	—	—	—	—
2020–21	Anaheim Ducks	NHL	48	7	13	20	18	—	—	—	—	—
2021–22	Anaheim Ducks	NHL	75	37	30	67	26	—	—	—	—	—
2022–23	Anaheim Ducks	NHL	70	23	38	61	22	—	—	—	—	—
2023–24	Anaheim Ducks	NHL	76	20	34	54	24	—	—	—	—	—
2024–25	Anaheim Ducks	NHL	77	21	34	55	20	—	—	—	—	—
2025–26	Anaheim Ducks	NHL	61	19	38	57	14	12	3	8	11	0
NHL totals			488	135	207	342	132	12	3	8	11	0

=== International ===
Year	Team	Event	Result	GP	G	A	Pts	PIM
2014	United States	IH18	3rd place, bronze medalist(s)	5	4	1	5	0
2015	United States	WJC18	1st place, gold medalist(s)	7	3	2	5	0
2017	United States	WJC	1st place, gold medalist(s)	7	4	3	7	2
2018	United States	OG	7th	5	0	5	5	4
Junior totals				19	11	6	17	2
Senior totals				5	0	5	5	4

== Awards and honors ==
Award	Year
College
NCAA All-Tournament Team	2017
NCAA champion	2017
NCHC Second All-Star Team	2018
AHCA First-Team West All-American	2018
NHL
All-Star Game	2022, 2023
International
WJC All-Decade Team	2019
