= Jarid Lukosevicius =

Canadian ice hockey player (born 1995)

- Born: February 5, 1995 (age 30) Squamish, British Columbia, Canada
- Height: 5 ft 10 in (178 cm)
- Weight: 193 lb (88 kg; 13 st 11 lb)
- Position: Right wing
- Shoots: Right
- ECHL team Former teams: Orlando Solar Bears; Grand Rapids Griffins; Abbotsford Canucks; Belleville Senators; HKM Zvolen; Vlci Žilina; HK Dukla Michalovce
- NHL draft: Undrafted
- Playing career: 2015–present

Jarid Lukosevicius (born February 5, 1995) is a Canadian professional ice hockey player who is a right winger for Orlando Solar Bears of the ECHL. He was named as the NCAA Tournament's Most Outstanding Player for Denver during the program's national championship in 2017.

== Playing career ==
Lukosevicius began his college career in the fall of 2015 and had a fairly pedestrian freshman season. Though he did not contribute much offensively, Lukosevicius did help the Pioneers reach the Frozen Four. Lukosevicius found his game as a sophomore, more than tripling his point production and helped lead Denver to its first conference title in seven years. While Denver fell in the NCHC semifinals, the team's record was still strong enough to earn them the top overall seed for the NCAA Tournament. Lukosevicius scored twice in the regional final against Penn State, including the game-winner. During the national championship game in just less than eight-minute span in the second period, Lukosevicius scored three goals (including two goals in 16 seconds) to give Denver a three-goal lead. Lukosevicius' hat-trick was the first in a championship game since 1993 which, coincidentally, was recorded by his head coach, Jim Montgomery.

After the NCAA championship Lukosevicius remained one of Denver's top goal scorers, recording 21 goals as a junior in the 2017–18 season and leading the Pioneers with 19 as a senior in 2018–19. That season, he helped Denver return to the Frozen Four but the team was eliminated in the semifinals. After finishing his college career, Lukosevicius signed with the Grand Rapids Griffins of the American Hockey League (AHL) and made his professional debut during the 2019 Calder Cup playoffs. He spent the next two seasons with Grand Rapids but could not find any consistent playing time. He played just 46 games with the Griffins before returning to western Canada when he signed a one-year contract with the Abbotsford Canucks of the AHL for the 2021–22 season.

On September 30, 2022, Lukosevicius signed a one-year contract with the South Carolina Stingrays of the ECHL. He spent the majority of the 2022–23 season with the Belleville Senators of the AHL after signing a professional tryout (PTO) contract on October 28.

The Stingrays re-signed Lukosevicius to a one-year contract on September 12, 2023. On November 10, he again signed a professional tryout (PTO) contract with AHL's Senators after starting the 2023–24 season in the ECHL. Lukosevicius returned to the Stingrays on January 11, 2024, after appearing in 19 games for Belleville while on loan.

On January 29, 2024, Lukosevicius signed a one-year contract with HKM Zvolen of the Slovak Extraliga.

On June 18, 2024, Lukosevicius was signed to a one-year contract by Vlci Žilina of the Slovak Extraliga.

On December 12, 2024, Lukosevicius signed with HK Dukla Michalovce of the Slovak Extraliga.

On August 15, 2025, Lukosevicius signed a one-year contract with ECHL's Orlando Solar Bears.

== Personal life ==
Lukosevicius was born and grew up in Squamish, British Columbia. He is of Lithuanian descent; his maternal grandparents emigrated from Lithuania to Quebec.

== Career statistics ==
			Regular season					Playoffs
Season	Team	League	GP	G	A	Pts	PIM	GP	G	A	Pts	PIM
2012–13	Powell River Kings	BCHL	4	0	3	3	2	—	—	—	—	—
2013–14	Powell River Kings	BCHL	57	26	33	59	40	9	1	7	8	13
2014–15	Powell River Kings	BCHL	55	33	40	73	28	13	4	10	14	8
2015–16	University of Denver	NCHC	34	6	4	10	22	—	—	—	—	—
2016–17	University of Denver	NCHC	43	16	16	32	31	—	—	—	—	—
2017–18	University of Denver	NCHC	41	21	13	34	26	—	—	—	—	—
2018–19	University of Denver	NCHC	40	19	10	29	20	—	—	—	—	—
2018–19	Grand Rapids Griffins	AHL	—	—	—	—	—	1	0	0	0	0
2019–20	Grand Rapids Griffins	AHL	29	6	2	8	29	—	—	—	—	—
2020–21	Grand Rapids Griffins	AHL	17	1	1	2	2	—	—	—	—	—
2021–22	Abbotsford Canucks	AHL	62	10	9	19	23	2	0	0	0	0
2022–23	South Carolina Stingrays	ECHL	5	5	3	8	0	6	4	1	5	4
2022–23	Belleville Senators	AHL	52	7	6	13	13	—	—	—	—	—
2023–24	South Carolina Stingrays	ECHL	15	10	9	19	17	—	—	—	—	—
2023–24	Belleville Senators	AHL	19	2	1	3	31	—	—	—	—	—
2023–24	HKM Zvolen	SVK	10	5	6	11	12	10	3	4	7	39
2024–25	Vlci Žilina	SVK	21	4	10	14	4	—	—	—	—	—
2024–25	HK Dukla Michalovce	SVK	15	6	3	9	2	5	2	1	3	0
SVK totals			46	15	19	34	18	15	5	5	10	39
AHL totals			179	26	19	45	98	3	0	0	0	0

== Awards and honors ==
Award	Year	Ref
NCAA All-Tournament Team	2017	

Awards and achievements
Preceded by Drake Caggiula	NCAA Tournament Most Outstanding Player; 2017	Succeeded by Karson Kuhlman
