= Dylan Gambrell =

American ice hockey player (born 1996)

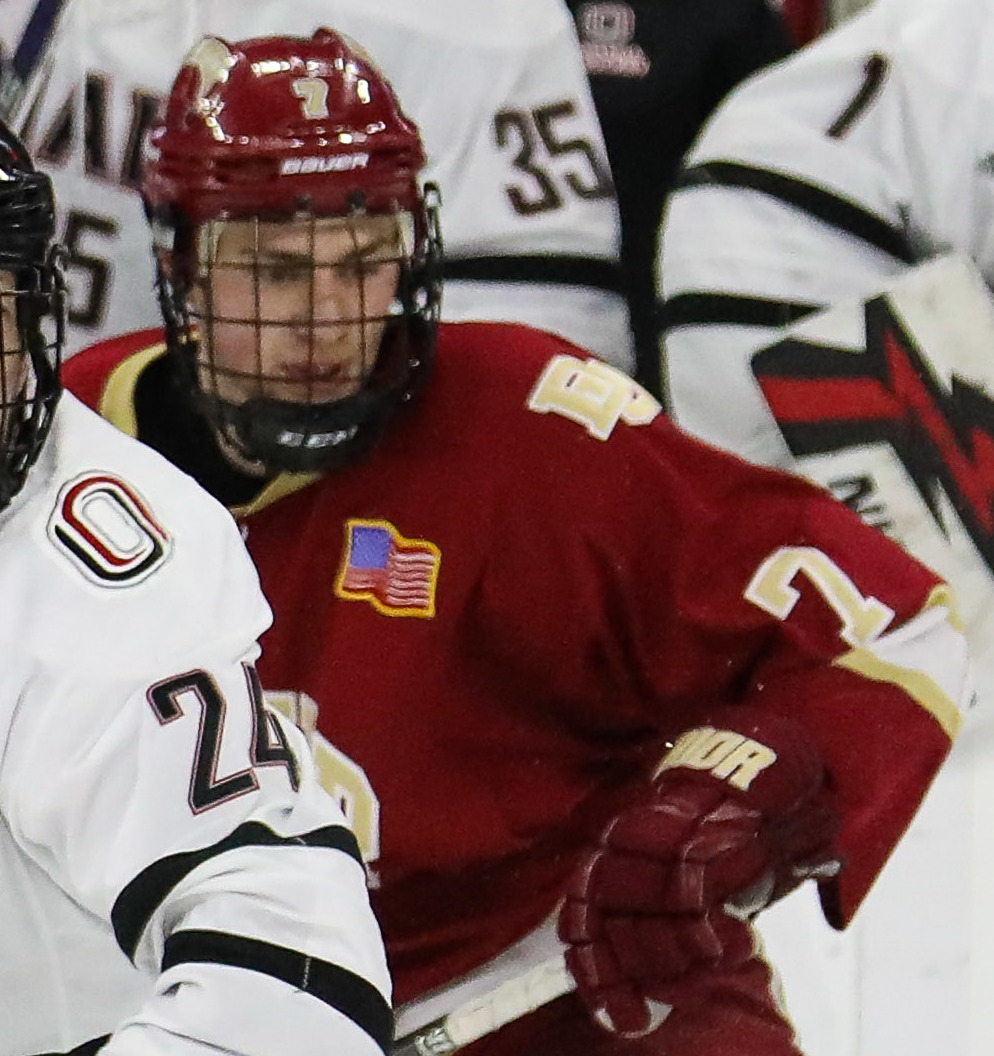
- Gambrell with the Denver Pioneers in 2017
- Born: August 26, 1996 (age 30) Bonney Lake, Washington, U.S.
- Height: 6 ft 0 in (183 cm)
- Weight: 185 lb (84 kg; 13 st 3 lb)
- Position: Center
- Shoots: Right
- NHL team (P) Cur. team Former teams: Minnesota Wild; Iowa Wild (AHL); San Jose Sharks; Ottawa Senators
- NHL draft: 60th overall, 2016; San Jose Sharks
- Playing career: 2018–present

Dylan Gambrell (born August 26, 1996) is an American professional ice hockey center for the Iowa Wild in the American Hockey League (AHL) while under contract to the Minnesota Wild of the National Hockey League (NHL). He was selected 60th overall by the San Jose Sharks in the 2016 NHL entry draft. He also previously played for the Ottawa Senators.

== Early life ==
Gambrell grew up playing hockey in Kent, Washington for the Kent Valley Hockey Association thanks to his father's roller hockey background. In order to hone his skills in preparation for a possible college hockey career, he moved to Colorado at the age of 14 to play junior hockey with the Colorado Thunderbirds of the T1EHL at the under-16 level.

== Playing career ==
=== Amateur ===
He was selected 11th overall by the Dubuque Fighting Saints of the United States Hockey League (USHL) in the 2012 USHL Futures draft. He made his USHL debut in the 2012–13 season, scoring nine goals and 18 assists for 27 points in 58 games played. The Fighting Saints qualified for the playoffs and advanced to the final where they won the USHL Clark Cup. He played in nine playoff games, registering two assists. In his second season with Dubuque in 2013–14 he tallied 14 goals and 43 points in 60 games. Dubuque made the playoffs again and made it to the Eastern Conference final where they were eliminated by the Indiana Ice. In seven playoff games, Gambrell went scoreless. In his final season with the Fighting Saints in 2014–15, he recorded 16 goals and 38 points in 54 games. For the second consecutive season, Dubuque made it to the Eastern Conference final but were bounced again, this time by the Muskegon Lumberjacks. In eight playoff games, he tallied three goals and seven points.

He began his collegiate career with the University of Denver Pioneers in the National Collegiate Hockey Conference (NCHC) in the 2015–16 season. Operating as the team's first line center, in 41 appearances, he registered 17 goals and 47 points, second on the team in scoring. He was named to the NCHC All-Rookie Team at the end of his first year. The Pioneers advanced to the Frozen Four of the 2016 NCAA Division I men's ice hockey tournament, but were knocked out by the North Dakota Fighting Hawks. He returned for the 2016–17 season as a sophomore, in which he tallied 13 goals and 42 points in 38 games. The Pioneers earned the Penrose Cup as conference champions. As a result, Denver returned to the 2017 NCAA Division I men's ice hockey tournament and advanced final where they beat the Minnesota Duluth Bulldogs and became national champions. In the 2017–18 season, Gambrell placed third in team scoring as a junior with 13 goals and 43 points in 41 games. Denver finished second in the conference, but won the conference tournament championship over the top-ranked St. Cloud State Huskies. In the 2018 NCAA Division I men's ice hockey tournament, the Pioneers made it to the Midwest Regional Final where they were eliminated by the Ohio State Buckeyes.

=== Professional ===
Gambrell was selected by the San Jose Sharks of the National Hockey League (NHL) in the second round, 60th overall, in the 2016 NHL entry draft. Gambrell concluded his collegiate career by signing a two-year, entry-level contract with the San Jose Sharks on March 26, 2018. He was immediately added to the Sharks playing roster, and made his NHL debut in a 4–2 defeat to the Dallas Stars on April 3, 2018. He completed the regular season going scoreless in three games.

Entering the 2018–19 season, on October 2, 2018, he was assigned to the Sharks American Hockey League (AHL) affiliate, the San Jose Barracuda. He was recalled five days later after Joe Thornton was injured. He spent the majority of the season with the Barracuda, registering 20 goals and 45 points in 51 games. He was recalled a second time on January 15, 2019. He appeared in eight games for the Sharks, going scoreless. Back with the Barracuda, he appeared in four playoff games, marking one goal and four points as the Barracuda were bounced by the San Diego Gulls. Gambrell was recalled again on April 16 and inserted into the playoff lineup for Game 6 after Joe Pavelski was injured in Game 5 of the 2019 Western Conference Finals. He scored his first NHL goal versus the St. Louis Blues as the Sharks only goal during the Blues' 5–1 Game 6 victory. He finished the playoffs appearing in two games as the Sharks were eliminated by the Blues.

That off-season he was re-signed by the Sharks to a two-year contract on July 11, 2019. Gambrell appeared in 50 games in the 2019–20 season, scoring five goals and eleven points, before the season was suspended on March 12, 2020, due to the COVID-19 pandemic. During the pandemic-shortened 2020–21 season, Gambrell appeared in 49 games, scoring five goals and twelve points. He led the team's forwards in ice time on the penalty kill. After the 2020–21 season, he signed a one-year contract extension. On October 9, 2021, Gambrell was placed on waivers after he was beaten out in training camp for the final spot on the Sharks roster by Jasper Weatherby. He went unclaimed and Gambrell was assigned by the Sharks to the AHL to start the 2021–22 season with the San Jose Barracuda, making two appearances.

Gambrell was traded by the Sharks to the Ottawa Senators in exchange for a seventh-round pick in 2022 on October 24, 2021. Gambrell was recalled to Ottawa following the trade. He was acquired to provide depth following a series of injuries to Ottawa's centers. He made his debut on October 29 in a 4–1 victory over the Dallas Stars. He tallied his first point with the team, assisting on Austin Watson's first period goal, in a 6–5 overtime loss to the Colorado Avalanche on December 4. He recorded his first goal for the Senators, a shorthanded goal, against the Florida Panthers on December 14. He finished the season with the Senators, registering three goals and seven points in 63 games. Gambrell signed a one-year extension with the Senators on June 15, 2022. During the 2022–23 season Gambrell played in 60 games scoring four goals and ten points.

On July 3, 2023, Gambrell was signed as a free agent to a one-year, $775,000 contract with the Toronto Maple Leafs for the 2023–24 season. Gambrell attended the Maple Leafs 2023 training camp, but failed to make the team. He was placed on waivers on October 8, and after going unclaimed, was assigned to the Maple Leafs' AHL affiliate, the Toronto Marlies. He remained with the Marlies for the duration of the season, posting 36 points through 66 regular season games. In the 2024 Calder Cup playoffs, he added one goal in three games for the Marlies.

On July 2, 2024, Gambrell joined his fourth NHL organization in signing as a free agent to a one-year, two-way contract with the Columbus Blue Jackets. After clearing waivers, Gambrell was assigned to Columbus' AHL affiliate, the Cleveland Monsters, for the 2024–25 season. In 54 games with the Monsters, he scored 13 goals and 25 points. The Monsters qualified for the playoffs and advanced to the second round where they were eliminated by the Laval Rocket. In six playoff games, Gambrell scored two goals.

Gambrell was invited to the Nashville Predators' 2025 training camp on a professional tryout (PTO). However, he failed to make the team and was cut from his PTO. Instead, he was assigned to their AHL affiliate, the Milwaukee Admirals. He signed a PTO with the Admirals for their training camp. However, no contract was forthcoming from Milwaukee and signed a one-year AHL contract with the Iowa Wild on December 15, 2025. In 35 games with Iowa, he registered ten goals and 36 points. He was signed to a one-year, two-way contract with the Minnesota Wild, for the 2026–27 season on July 1, 2026. He was placed on waivers on September 24, and having gone unclaimed, was assigned to Minnesota's AHL affiliate, the Iowa Wild.

== Career statistics ==
			Regular season					Playoffs
Season	Team	League	GP	G	A	Pts	PIM	GP	G	A	Pts	PIM
2012–13	Dubuque Fighting Saints	USHL	58	9	18	27	14	9	0	2	2	0
2013–14	Dubuque Fighting Saints	USHL	60	14	29	43	29	7	0	0	0	0
2014–15	Dubuque Fighting Saints	USHL	54	16	22	38	74	8	3	4	7	2
2015–16	University of Denver	NCHC	41	17	30	47	19	—	—	—	—	—
2016–17	University of Denver	NCHC	38	13	29	42	21	—	—	—	—	—
2017–18	University of Denver	NCHC	41	13	30	43	15	—	—	—	—	—
2017–18	San Jose Sharks	NHL	3	0	0	0	0	—	—	—	—	—
2018–19	San Jose Barracuda	AHL	51	20	25	45	18	4	1	3	4	0
2018–19	San Jose Sharks	NHL	8	0	0	0	2	2	1	0	1	2
2019–20	San Jose Barracuda	AHL	15	3	9	12	15	—	—	—	—	—
2019–20	San Jose Sharks	NHL	50	5	6	11	17	—	—	—	—	—
2020–21	San Jose Sharks	NHL	49	5	7	12	13	—	—	—	—	—
2021–22	San Jose Barracuda	AHL	3	0	1	1	4	—	—	—	—	—
2021–22	Ottawa Senators	NHL	63	3	4	7	12	—	—	—	—	—
2022–23	Ottawa Senators	NHL	60	4	6	10	35	—	—	—	—	—
2023–24	Toronto Marlies	AHL	66	14	22	36	16	3	1	0	1	0
2024–25	Cleveland Monsters	AHL	54	13	12	25	32	6	2	0	2	2
2025–26	Iowa Wild	AHL	35	10	26	36	4	—	—	—	—	—
NHL totals			233	17	23	40	79	2	1	0	1	2

== Awards and honors ==
Award	Year	Reference
USHL
Clark Cup (Dubuque Fighting Saints)	2013	
College
NCHC All-Rookie Team	2016	
NCAA Champion (Denver)	2017	
NCHC Second All-Star Team	2017, 2018	
