= Ben Blacker =

Podcaster, comic book writer, and screenwriter

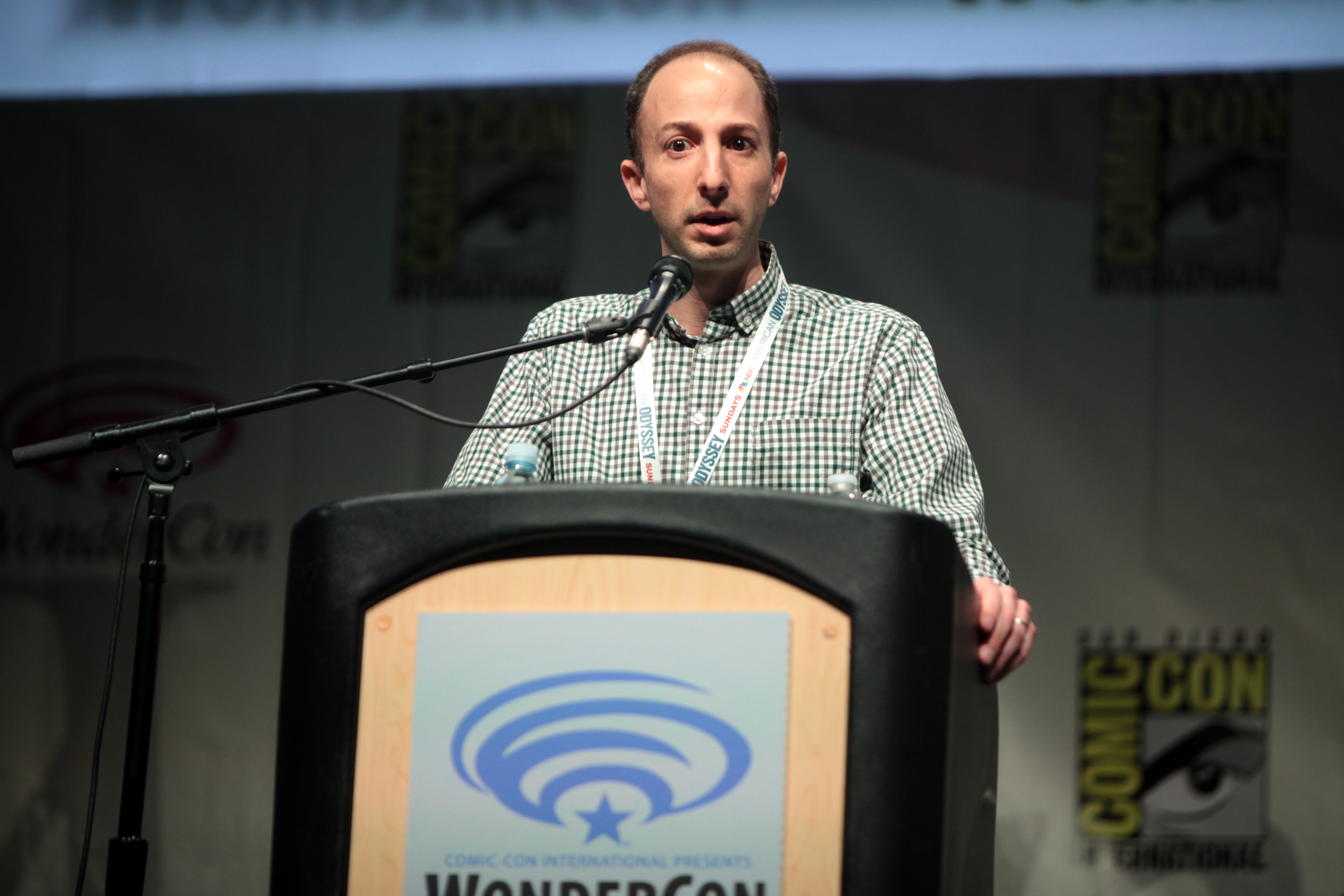
- Ben Blacker at WonderCon
- Education: Syracuse University, Emerson University
- Occupations: Podcaster, Screenwriter, and Comic Book Writer
- Writing career
- Years active: 2004-present
- Genres: supernatural horror; superhero; fantasy; western; science fiction

Ben Blacker is primarily known for working with his writing partner Ben Acker as a podcaster, comic book writer, and screenwriter. Blacker is known for his work on three podcasts, The Thrilling Adventure Hour (2005), The Writers Panel (2011), and Dead Pilots Society with Andrew Reich (2016). The Writers Panel, and Dead Pilots Society are two podcasts he started without Acker.

Blacker and Acker spun-off the stage radio show into The Thrilling Adventure Hour graphic novel from Archaia/Boom Studios for which Blacker and Acker were nominated for an Eisner Award in 2014. After this, in 2014 Blacker and Acker worked on two more comic books from The Thrilling Adventure Hour stage radio show, from Image Comics, Sparks Nevada, Marshal on Mars and Beyond Belief!. They also worked for Marvel, writing Thunderbolts comics (2013–2014).

As screenwriters, he and Ben Acker have contributed to The Adventures of Puss in Boots (2015) and a few other shows and movies. In 2018, Blacker took on a solo writing project and wrote a book known as Hex Wives for DC/Vertigo comics.

== Early life and education ==
Blacker met his writing partner Ben Acker at Syracuse University. Blacker than transferred to Emerson College to complete his studies in television writing.

== Career ==
=== Podcasting ===
In 2005, Blacker, and Acker produced The Thrilling Adventure Hour as a live stage show. The Thrilling Adventure Hour is a stage show in the style of old-time radio in which the actors read the lines from a script for a live studio audience. It eventually transitioned to be a podcast as well. The show incorporates various genres including westerns, science fiction, and the supernatural. NPR’s Neda Ulaby referred to the show as a clever update to old time stage radio plays. Politico’s Jacob Silverman found Blacker and Acker’s writing to be “snappy”.

In 2011, Ben Blacker, without Acker, began the Writers Panel, in which Blacker would gather television industry screenwriters to talk about the craft of screenwriting, and the business of making television and movies.

In 2016 Blacker started his third podcast, this time with Andrew Reich who had previously written for the television show Friends. The podcast is called Dead Pilots Society. The podcast would feature pilots which had not been made into television series. Blacker would then gather a series of actors to do a table read. Through this podcast they were able to resurrect an once dead pilot in to a television show that will air on CBS in the fall of 2026.

=== Comic book writing ===
In 2013 and 2014, Blacker and Acker contributed to the Marvel comics series Thunderbolts. They wrote an annual issue, a once a year oversized issue for a series, in 2013. In 2014, they wrote a six issue trade paperback covering issues #27-32 of “Thunderbolts” as well. Jordan Richards of AIPT found the annual issue to be humorous as well as serious with Blacker, Acker, and their fellow artists creating memorable characters in the issue. The #27-32 trade paperback was not as well received by Frank Plowright of Slings and Arrows: Graphic Novel Guide. He found the ending to be rushed, and one of the main characters, “Thunderbolt” Ross to be completely mischaracterized. He ended up giving the trade a 1 ½ star rating.

Also, in 2013 they published a spin off of their radio stage play into a graphic novel entitled The Thrilling Adventure Hour. In 2014 it was nominated for an Eisner award for Best Anthology. It ended up losing to Dark Horse Presents from comic imprint Dark Horse. For 2015, Blacker and Acker spun off two stories from their The Thrilling Adventure Hour podcast into comics. Those two specific stories are "Sparks Nevada, Marshal on Mars" and "Beyond Belief!". The stories expanded on the western, science fiction elements of “Sparks Nevada, Marshall on Mars”, and the supernatural elements found in “Beyond Belief!”. The first issue of "Sparks Nevada, Marshal on Mars" explores the back story and training of Sparks Nevada. Later on in the issue he meets Martians, and faces off against outlaw robots. The first issue of “Beyond Belief!" is about the Doyles helping a friend who has moved into a haunted house. After reading "Sparks Nevada, Marshal on Mars", Doug Zawisza of Comic Book Resources wrote that Blacker and Acker created a magnificent welcome for new readers to enjoy. Jean-Luc Botbyl from We The Nerdy found “Beyond Belief!” to be quirky, and the plot to be superficial, yet at the end of the review he recommended the book for his readers.

In 2018 Blacker created a comic for DC/Vertigo Comics. This comic was entitled Hex Wives. Blacker wrote this comic on his own accompanied by the artwork of Mirka Andolfo. Hex Wives is a story set in what seems like an idyllic suburb but all of the suburb's wives are witches, and their husbands have taken away their awareness of their powers. Etelka Lehoczky of NPR wrote that the comic book is a fun romp. She also said that Blacker did not lose any of his confidence in writing a book about women with supernatural powers. Lehoczky said he learned from the women around him that empathy is a superpower.

=== Screenwriting ===
For 2015, Blacker and his writing partner Acker started to write for the streaming program The Adventures of Puss in Boots. The show is a spinoff of the Shrek franchise which debuted in 2001. The show is about Puss in Boots’ quest to save the town of San Lorenzo after he accidentally reverses a spell hiding a treasure. The knowledge of the treasure attracts many thieves, and Puss in Boots feels obligated to help the people of San Lorenzo due to his mistake. The show does not have either a rotten tomatoes score or metacritic score from critics. However, the show holds a 89% positive ratings from fans.

Blacker and Acker also wrote for the fantasy show Supernatural about two brothers Sam and Dean Winchester as they fight against other worldly demons. Their episode Season 7, Episode 7, entitled The Mentalists was picked as the 33rd worst episode among all Supernatural episodes according to television critic Danielle Turchiano at Variety. She wrote in the list that the episode was too slow-moving and as a result not very fun.

The pair have also written for other live action series, such as martial arts sitcom Supah Ninjas, which follows a teenager's adventures with his friends after he finds out he descends from a long line of ninjas.

In 2010, Blacker and Acker wrote a film entitled Drones, directed by Amber Benson and Adam Busch, in which a mild-mannered office worker discovers many of his co-workers are in fact space aliens. Dennis Harvey of Variety thought the film might find a cult following after its release due to “deft farcical performances, witty script and sure-footed handling (by two thesps-turned-helmers)”.

== Personal life ==
Blacker spends his off time with his wife, and his dogs.

== Podcasts ==
- The Thrilling Adventure Hour (2011)
- The Writers Panel (2011)
- Dead Pilots Society (2016)

== Illustrated bibliography ==
- The Thrilling Adventure Hour (2013)
- Marvel's Thunderbolts (2013/2014)
- Sparks Nevada, Marshall on Mars (2015)
- Beyond Belief! (2015)
- Hex Wives (2018)

== Selected filmography ==
- Drones (2010 film)
- Supernatural (2011)
- Supah Ninjas (2011)
- The Adventures of Puss In Boots (2015)
