= Joey Anderson =

American ice hockey player (born 1998)

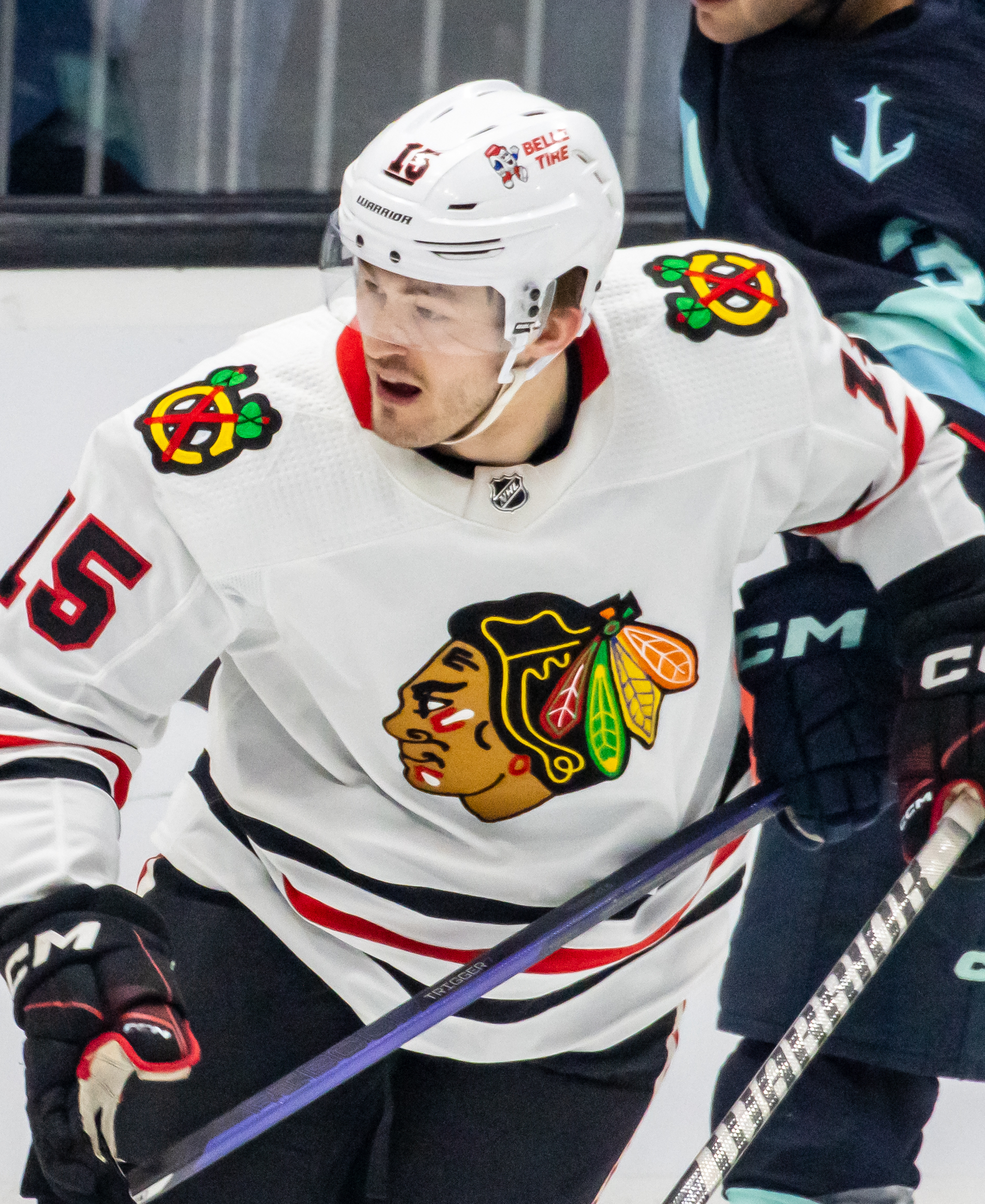
- Anderson with the Chicago Blackhawks in 2023
- Born: June 19, 1998 (age 28) Roseville, Minnesota, U.S.
- Height: 5 ft 11 in (180 cm)
- Weight: 192 lb (87 kg; 13 st 10 lb)
- Position: Right wing
- Shoots: Right
- AHL team Former teams: Hershey Bears; New Jersey Devils; Toronto Maple Leafs; Chicago Blackhawks
- NHL draft: 73rd overall, 2016; New Jersey Devils
- Playing career: 2018–present

Joseph Thomas Anderson (born June 19, 1998) is an American professional ice hockey forward for the Hershey Bears of the American Hockey League (AHL). He has previously played in the National Hockey League (NHL) for the New Jersey Devils, Toronto Maple Leafs and Chicago Blackhawks.

== Playing career ==
=== Amateur ===
On April 3, 2014, Anderson committed to play for the USA Hockey National Team Development Program coming out of Hill-Murray School with 50 points that season. After graduating from Ann Arbor Pioneer High School, Anderson was drafted by the New Jersey Devils of the National Hockey League (NHL) in the third round, 73rd overall, of the 2016 NHL entry draft. After the draft, he decided to stay with Minnesota–Duluth Bulldogs of the National Collegiate Hockey Conference (NCHC). In his rookie season with the Bulldogs, Anderson played in the 2017 NCHC Frozen Faceoff championship game where he scored the game-winning goal to help the Bulldogs capture their first title over the University of North Dakota. For his efforts, he was named to the NCHC All-Rookie Team and to the NCAA West Region All-Tournament Team. The following season, Anderson won the 2018 NCAA Tournament championships with the Bulldogs.

=== Professional ===
On April 15, 2018, Anderson signed a three-year, entry-level contract with the Devils. After appearing in eight games for the Binghamton Devils in the 2018–19 season of the American Hockey League (AHL), Anderson earned his first call up to the NHL, and made his NHL debut on October 27, 2018, in a 3–2 win over the Florida Panthers. On November 15, Anderson recorded his first career NHL goal in a 3–0 win over the Philadelphia Flyers. He finished the season splitting it between Binghamton, where he scored 2 goals and 6 points in 13 games and 4 goals and 7 points in 34 games with New Jersey. He again began the season in Binghamton, but was recalled in February by New Jersey. He had 15 goals and 34 points in 44 games in the AHL before his recall. He made his NHL season debut on February 4 in a 5–4 loss to the Montreal Canadiens. He appeared in 18 games, scoring four goals and six points before the NHL suspended the season due to the COVID-19 pandemic on 12 March.

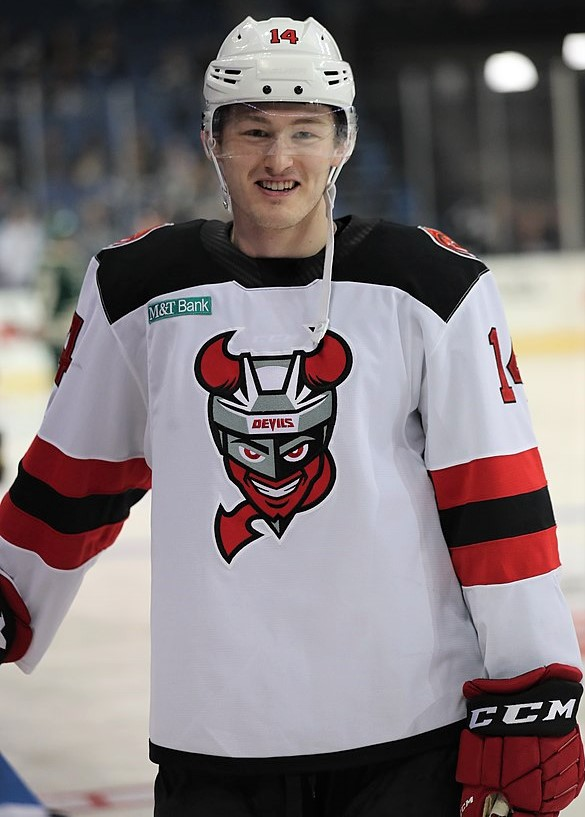
Anderson with the Binghamton Devils in 2020

As an impending restricted free agent with the Devils, on October 10, 2020, Anderson was traded to the Toronto Maple Leafs in exchange for forward Andreas Johnsson. On October 30, he signed a three-year contract with his new team for an annual average value of $750,000. He was assigned to the Maple Leafs' AHL affiliate, the Toronto Marlies for the majority of the pandemic-shortened 2020–21 season, appearing in 20 games, scoring seven goals and 11 points. He was recalled and made his Maple Leafs debut on January 26, 2021 in a 4–3 victory over the Calgary Flames. In his second season with the Maple Leafs in 2021–22, Anderson led the Toronto Marlies in goals with twenty-six scored in fifty-six games.

During the 2022–23 season, Anderson made 14 appearances with the Maple Leafs in registering 3 points, however was unable to solidify a forward role on the team and was subject to waivers on multiple occasions. On re-assignment to the Marlies, Anderson as an alternate captain posted 27 points in 30 games. On February 27, 2023, Anderson was traded by the Maple Leafs, along with Pavel Gogolev and two future first and second-round draft selections to the Chicago Blackhawks in exchange for Jake McCabe, Sam Lafferty, and two future conditional picks. He finished the season playing in 24 games for Chicago, registering four goals and six points on a line with Jujhar Khaira and Boris Katchouk. He also played with Chicago's AHL affiliate, the Rockford IceHogs.

In the offseason, Anderson signed a one-year, two-way contract with Chicago after impressing the Blackhawks' front office with his forechecking ability. However, Anderson did not make the Blackhawks out of training camp and after going unclaimed on waivers, was assigned to Rockford to begin the 2023–24 season. After injuries to forwards Andreas Athanasiou and Taylor Hall, Anderson was recalled by Chicago on November 25. He played in 55 games with the Blackhawks, scoring five goals and 17 points and played well defensively. A restricted free agent at season's end, the Blackhawks did not give him a qualifying offer, making him an unrestricted free agent. However, on July 1, 2024, the first day of free agency, he signed a two-year contract with the Blackhawks.

After four seasons within the Blackhawks organization, Anderson left as a free agent and remained un-signed leading into the 2026–27 season. On September 22, 2026, Anderson agreed to a professional tryout contract with the Hershey Bears of the AHL, the primary affiliate to the Washington Capitals.

== International play ==
Anderson competed for Team USA's junior team at the 2017 World Junior Ice Hockey Championships where he helped them win a gold medal. By doing so, Anderson became the first Bulldog to win a gold medal at the World Junior Ice Hockey Championships. The following year, Anderson was named the captain of Team USA for the 2018 World Junior Ice Hockey Championships. That year he played alongside his younger brother Mikey to guide the team to a bronze medal.

== Personal life ==
Anderson's younger brother, Mikey, was drafted 103rd overall by the Los Angeles Kings in the 2017 NHL entry draft, while his sister, Sami, played hockey for the College of St. Scholastica. His father, Gerry, also played hockey for College of St. Scholastica and his grandfather played for Minnesota–Duluth Bulldogs. His mother, Dana, was a professional racquetball player.

Joey married Sami Schneider on July 9, 2022 in St. Paul, Minnesota.

== Career statistics ==
=== Regular season and playoffs ===
| | | | Regular season | | | | | Playoffs |
| Season | Team | League | GP | G | A | Pts | PIM | GP | G | A | Pts | PIM |
|---|---|---|---|---|---|---|---|---|---|---|---|---|
| 2012–13 | Hill-Murray School | USHS | 12 | 14 | 9 | 23 | 2 | 3 | 1 | 3 | 4 | 0 |
| 2013–14 | Hill-Murray School | USHS | 25 | 21 | 29 | 50 | 16 | 3 | 4 | 2 | 6 | 2 |
| 2014–15 | U.S. National Development Team | USHL | 35 | 14 | 10 | 24 | 6 | — | — | — | — | — |
| 2015–16 | U.S. National Development Team | USHL | 25 | 10 | 10 | 20 | 14 | — | — | — | — | — |
| 2016–17 | Minnesota–Duluth Bulldogs | NCHC | 39 | 12 | 25 | 37 | 8 | — | — | — | — | — |
| 2017–18 | Minnesota–Duluth Bulldogs | NCHC | 36 | 11 | 16 | 27 | 20 | — | — | — | — | — |
| 2018–19 | Binghamton Devils | AHL | 13 | 2 | 4 | 6 | 5 | — | — | — | — | — |
| 2018–19 | New Jersey Devils | NHL | 34 | 4 | 3 | 7 | 6 | — | — | — | — | — |
| 2019–20 | Binghamton Devils | AHL | 44 | 15 | 19 | 34 | 2 | — | — | — | — | — |
| 2019–20 | New Jersey Devils | NHL | 18 | 4 | 2 | 6 | 2 | — | — | — | — | — |
| 2020–21 | Toronto Maple Leafs | NHL | 1 | 0 | 0 | 0 | 2 | — | — | — | — | — |
| 2020–21 | Toronto Marlies | AHL | 20 | 7 | 4 | 11 | 10 | — | — | — | — | — |
| 2021–22 | Toronto Marlies | AHL | 56 | 26 | 16 | 42 | 19 | — | — | — | — | — |
| 2021–22 | Toronto Maple Leafs | NHL | 5 | 0 | 0 | 0 | 0 | — | — | — | — | — |
| 2022–23 | Toronto Marlies | AHL | 30 | 14 | 13 | 27 | 8 | — | — | — | — | — |
| 2022–23 | Toronto Maple Leafs | NHL | 14 | 2 | 1 | 3 | 0 | — | — | — | — | — |
| 2022–23 | Chicago Blackhawks | NHL | 24 | 4 | 2 | 6 | 0 | — | — | — | — | — |
| 2022–23 | Rockford IceHogs | AHL | 2 | 0 | 3 | 3 | 0 | 5 | 2 | 1 | 3 | 0 |
| 2023–24 | Rockford IceHogs | AHL | 14 | 7 | 9 | 16 | 2 | — | — | — | — | — |
| 2023–24 | Chicago Blackhawks | NHL | 55 | 5 | 12 | 17 | 8 | — | — | — | — | — |
| 2024–25 | Chicago Blackhawks | NHL | 18 | 0 | 1 | 1 | 0 | — | — | — | — | — |
| 2024–25 | Rockford IceHogs | AHL | 33 | 17 | 10 | 27 | 8 | 7 | 5 | 3 | 8 | 2 |
| 2025–26 | Rockford IceHogs | AHL | 52 | 17 | 16 | 33 | 14 | — | — | — | — | — |
| NHL totals | | | 169 | 19 | 21 | 40 | 18 | — | — | — | — | — |

=== International ===
| Year | Team | Event | Result | GP | G | A | Pts | PIM |
|---|---|---|---|---|---|---|---|---|
| 2014 | United States | U17 | 2nd place, silver medalist(s) | 6 | 3 | 2 | 5 | 0 |
| 2016 | United States | U18 | 3rd place, bronze medalist(s) | 7 | 7 | 2 | 9 | 2 |
| 2017 | United States | WJC | 1st place, gold medalist(s) | 7 | 0 | 2 | 2 | 0 |
| 2018 | United States | WJC | 3rd place, bronze medalist(s) | 7 | 4 | 3 | 7 | 0 |
| Junior totals | | | | 27 | 14 | 9 | 23 | 2 |

== Awards and honors ==
| Award | Year | Reference |
College
| NCHC All-Rookie Team | 2017 | |
| NCAA West Regional All-Tournament Team | 2017 | |
