= 2016–17 UConn Huskies men's ice hockey season =

Desert Hockey Classic, Champion
- Conference: Hockey East
- Home ice: XL Center

Record
- Overall: 12–16–8 (8–10–4 HE)
- Home: 6–6–3
- Road: 4–9–5
- Neutral: 2–1–0

Coaches and captains
- Head coach: Mike Cavanaugh
- Assistant coaches: Brendan Buckley; Joe Pereira; Andrew Raycroft

The 2016–17 UConn Huskies men's ice hockey team represented the University of Connecticut in the 2016–17 NCAA Division I men's ice hockey season. The team was coached by Mike Cavanaugh his fourth season behind the bench at UConn. The Huskies played their home games at the XL Center in downtown Hartford, Connecticut, competing in their third season in Hockey East.

== Personnel ==
=== Roster ===
As of September 7, 2016.

No.	Nat.	Player	Class	Pos	Height	Weight	DoB	Hometown	Previous team	NHL rights
1		Tanner Creel	Junior	G	5' 10" (1.78 m)	165 lb (75 kg)	1994-04-10	Arlington Heights, Illinois	Odessa (NAHL)	—
2		Derek Pratt (C)	Junior	D	6' 2" (1.88 m)	190 lb (86 kg)	1994-03-12	Mount Hermon, Massachusetts	Waterloo (USHL)	—
4		Bryan Nelson	Freshman	D	6' 3" (1.91 m)	225 lb (102 kg)	1996-02-19	Upton, Massachusetts	CT Jr. Rangers (USPHL)	—
5		David Drake	Junior	D	6' 6" (1.98 m)	195 lb (88 kg)	1995-01-07	Naperville, Illinois	Des Moines (USHL)	PHI, 192nd overall 2013
6		Johnny Austin	Junior	D	5' 11" (1.8 m)	195 lb (88 kg)	1995-07-22	St. Louis Park, Minnesota	Benilde-St. Margaret's (USHS–MN)	—
7		Joona Kunnas	Senior	D	6' 4" (1.93 m)	200 lb (91 kg)	1993-07-28	Vintaa, Finland	Islanders (USPHL)	—
8		Spencer Naas	Junior	F	5' 11" (1.8 m)	185 lb (84 kg)	1994-07-14	Minnetonka, Minnesota	Benilde-St. Margaret's (USHS–MN)	—
9		Alexandre Payusov	Freshman	F	5' 11" (1.8 m)	180 lb (82 kg)	1997-07-26	Montreal, Quebec	Madison (USHL)	—
10		Miles Gendron	Sophomore	D	6' 3" (1.91 m)	190 lb (86 kg)	1996-06-28	Shrewsbury, Massachusetts	Penticton (BCHL)	OTT, 70th overall 2014
11		Corey Ronan	Junior	F	5' 8" (1.73 m)	190 lb (86 kg)	1995-10-06	Franklin, Massachusetts	St. Sebastian's (USHS–MA)	—
13		Joseph Masonius	Sophomore	D	6' 2" (1.88 m)	200 lb (91 kg)	1997-02-17	Spring Lake, New Jersey	USNTDP (USHL)	PIT, 181st overall 2016
16		Karl El-Mir	Sophomore	F	6' 0" (1.83 m)	185 lb (84 kg)	1996-03-14	Montreal, Quebec	Grande Prairie (AJHL)	—
17		Jesse Schwartz	Junior	F	6' 0" (1.83 m)	185 lb (84 kg)	1994-04-10	Toronto, Ontario	Victoria (BCHL)	—
18		Max Kalter	Sophomore	F	5' 8" (1.73 m)	160 lb (73 kg)	1996-03-01	Highland Park, Illinois	Sioux City (USHL)	—
19		Evan Richardson	Senior	F	5' 8" (1.73 m)	175 lb (79 kg)	1994-05-30	Nanaimo, British Columbia	Boston College (HEA)	—
20		Wyatt Newpower	Freshman	D	6' 4" (1.93 m)	200 lb (91 kg)	1997-12-09	Hugo, Minnesota	White Bear Lake (USHS–MN)	—
21		Jeff Wight	Junior	F	6' 3" (1.91 m)	200 lb (91 kg)	1995-12-04	Coquitlam, British Columbia	Merritt (BCHL)	—
22		Justin Howell	Freshman	F	5' 10" (1.78 m)	200 lb (91 kg)	1997-04-26	St. Paul, Minnesota	Des Moines (USHL)	—
23		Kasperi Ojantakanen	Junior	F	6' 0" (1.83 m)	170 lb (77 kg)	1995-01-12	Helsinki, Finland	Jokerit U20 (Nuorten SM-liiga)	—
24		Ben Freeman	Freshman	F	6' 5" (1.96 m)	205 lb (93 kg)	1996-01-10	Falmouth, Maine	CT Jr. Rangers (USPHL)	—
27		Maxim Letunov	Sophomore	F	6' 3" (1.91 m)	185 lb (84 kg)	1996-02-20	Moscow, Russia	Youngstown (USHL)	SJS, 52nd overall 2014
28		Brian Morgan	Senior (RS)	F	6' 0" (1.83 m)	190 lb (86 kg)	1994-04-01	Windham, New Hampshire	Maine (HEA)	—
29		Tage Thompson	Sophomore	F	6' 5" (1.96 m)	200 lb (91 kg)	1997-10-30	Orange, Connecticut	USNTDP (USHL)	STL, 26th overall 2016
30		Adam Huska	Freshman	G	6' 4" (1.93 m)	205 lb (93 kg)	1997-05-12	Zvolen, Slovakia	Green Bay (USHL)	NYR, 184th overall 2015
31		Rob Nichols	Senior	G	5' 11" (1.8 m)	185 lb (84 kg)	1992-09-10	Dallas, Texas	Wenatchee (NAHL)	—
35		Steve Thulin	Junior	G	6' 3" (1.91 m)	170 lb (77 kg)	1993-02-02	North Reading, Massachusetts	CT Jr. Rangers (USPHL)	—

=== Coaching staff ===
Name	Position	Seasons at UConn	Alma mater
Mike Cavanaugh	Head Coach	4	Bowdoin College (1990)
Joe Pereira	Assistant coach	4	Boston University (2011)
Brendan Buckley	Assistant coach	2	Boston College (1999)
Andrew Raycroft	Assistant coach	3	

== Standings ==
2016–17 Hockey East men's standings
	Conference record							Overall record					
	GP	W	L	T	PTS	GF	GA	GP	W	L	T	GF	GA
#4 Massachusetts–Lowell†*	22	14	7	1	29	76	51	41	27	11	3	151	95
#6 Boston University†	22	13	6	3	29	64	47	39	24	12	3	123	90
#16 Boston College†	22	13	6	3	29	74	56	40	21	15	4	132	104
#5 Notre Dame	22	12	6	4	28	67	51	40	23	12	5	128	93
#15 Providence	22	12	7	3	27	66	57	39	22	12	5	116	92
#18 Vermont	22	10	8	4	24	61	63	38	20	13	5	122	106
Merrimack	22	8	8	6	22	57	60	37	15	16	6	90	96
Northeastern	22	9	10	3	21	73	71	38	18	15	5	140	113
Connecticut	22	8	10	4	20	55	61	36	12	16	8	96	104
New Hampshire	22	7	11	4	18	69	77	40	15	20	5	124	136
Maine	22	5	15	2	12	57	79	36	11	21	4	102	125
Massachusetts	22	2	19	1	5	42	88	36	5	29	2	66	132
Championship: March 18, 2017 † indicates conference regular season champion; * indicates conference tournament champion Rankings: USCHO.com Top 20 Poll; updated March 6, 2017

== Schedule ==
Date	Time	Opponent^{#}	Rank^{#}	Site	TV	Result	Attendance	Record
Exhibition
October 1	2:05 pm	St. Francis Xavier*		Mark Edward Freitas Ice Forum • Storrs, Connecticut		L 3–4	1,256	
Regular Season
October 7	7:05 pm	Alabama–Huntsville*		XL Center • Hartford, Connecticut	HuskyVision	W 6–0	3,122	1–0–0
October 8	4:05 pm	Alabama–Huntsville*		XL Center • Hartford, Connecticut	HuskyVision	W 4–0	3,193	2–0–0
October 14	7:00 pm	at Colgate*		Starr Arena • Hamilton, New York	PLN	T 4–4 ^{OT}	1,391	2–0–1
October 15	7:00 PM	at RIT*		Blue Cross Arena • Rochester, New York	AH	T 1–1 ^{OT}	10,556	2–0–2
October 19	7:00 pm	at #4 Quinnipiac*		TD Bank Sports Center • Hamden, Connecticut	QAA	L 2–5	3,290	2–1–2
October 21	7:05 pm	American International*		XL Center • Hartford, Connecticut	HuskyVision	T 2–2 ^{OT}	3,529	2–1–3
October 27	7:35 pm	at #7 Notre Dame		Compton Family Ice Arena • Notre Dame, Indiana	CSNC	W 4–2	2,936	3–1–3 (1–0–0)
October 28	7:35 pm	at #7 Notre Dame		Compton Family Ice Arena • Notre Dame, Indiana	NBCS	L 2–6	4,065	3–2–3 (1–1–0)
November 4	7:00 pm	at UMass		William D. Mullins Memorial Center • Amherst, Massachusetts	USN	T 2–2 ^{OT}	2,963	3–2–4 (1–1–1)
November 11	7:00 pm	at #14 Ohio State*		Value City Arena • Columbus, Ohio	HuskyVision	L 4–7	3,669	3–3–4
November 12	4:00 pm	at #14 Ohio State*		Value City Arena • Columbus, Ohio	HuskyVision	T 3–3 ^{OT}	3,956	3–3–5
November 18	7:05 pm	#5 Boston University		XL Center • Hartford, Connecticut	HuskyVision	L 1–2	5,383	3–4–5 (1–2–1)
November 19	7:00 pm	at #5 Boston University		Agganis Arena • Boston, Massachusetts	CI	W 4–0	4,526	4–4–5 (2–2–1)
November 22	7:05 pm	#4 Boston College		XL Center • Hartford, Connecticut	HuskyVision	L 2–5	5,127	4–5–5 (2–3–1)
November 26	3:05 pm	Sacred Heart*		XL Center • Hartford, Connecticut	HuskyVision	L 2–4	3,699	4–6–5
December 2	7:15 pm	at #4 UMass Lowell		Tsongas Center • Lowell, Massachusetts	GRHTV	W 3–2	5,464	5–6–5 (3–3–1)
December 3	3:35 pm	#4 UMass Lowell		XL Center • Hartford, Connecticut	HuskyVision	T 2–2 ^{OT}	3,890	5–6–6 (3–3–2)
December 9	6:30 pm	UMass		XL Center • Hartford, Connecticut	ASN/NESN	W 3–1	3,949	6–6–6 (4–3–2)
December 30	6:00 pm	vs. #18 St. Cloud State*		Prescott Valley Event Center • Prescott Valley, Arizona (Desert Hockey Classic)	HTV	W 4–3	1,153	7–6–6
December 31	4:00 pm	vs. Brown*		Prescott Valley Event Center • Prescott Valley, Arizona (Desert Hockey Classic)	HTV	W 4–1	814	8–6–6
January 7	3:05 pm	Yale*		XL Center • Hartford, Connecticut	HuskyVision	L 2–4	4,909	8–7–6
January 12	7:05 pm	Maine		Webster Bank Arena • Bridgeport, Connecticut	HuskyVision	W 6–3	2,173	9–7–6 (5–3–2)
January 14	4:00 pm	vs. Maine		Fenway Park • Boston, Massachusetts	NESN	L 0–4	16,432	9–8–6 (5–4–2)
January 20	6:00 pm	at #12 Vermont		Gutterson Fieldhouse • Burlington, Vermont	ASN/NESN	L 4–5	4,007	9–9–6 (5–5–2)
January 24	7:00 pm	at #13 Boston College		Conte Forum • Chestnut Hill, Massachusetts	BCTV	L 1–2	3,252	9–10–6 (5–6–2)
January 27	7:05 pm	#11 Vermont		XL Center • Hartford, Connecticut	HuskyVision	W 3–1	6,297	10–10–6 (6–6–2)
February 3	7:00 pm	at Merrimack		Volpe Complex • North Andover, Massachusetts		T 2–2 ^{OT}	2,549	10–10–7 (6–6–3)
February 4	3:05 pm	Merrimack		XL Center • Hartford, Connecticut	HuskyVision	T 2–2 ^{OT}	5,272	10–10–8 (6–6–4)
February 8	7:05 pm	#11 Providence		XL Center • Hartford, Connecticut	HuskyVision	L 1–4	4,040	10–11–8 (6–7–4)
February 10	7:05 pm	at #11 Providence		Schneider Arena • Providence, Rhode Island	HuskyVision	L 3–4	2,832	10–12–8 (6–8–4)
February 17	7:05 pm	Northeastern		XL Center • Hartford, Connecticut	HuskyVision	L 0–3	5,411	10–13–8 (6–9–4)
February 18	7:00 pm	at Northeastern		Matthews Arena • Boston, Massachusetts		L 1–4	2,789	10–14–8 (6–10–4)
February 24	7:00 pm	at New Hampshire		Whittemore Center • Durham, New Hampshire		W 5–3	5,107	11–14–8 (7–10–4)
February 25	7:35 pm	New Hampshire		XL Center • Hartford, Connecticut	HuskyVision	W 4–2	5,685	12–14–8 (8–10–4)
Hockey East Tournament
March 3	7:05 pm	vs. Northeastern		TD Garden • Boston, Massachusetts (Opening Round)		L 1–3	1,228	12–15–8
March 4	7:05 pm	vs. Northeastern		TD Garden • Boston, Massachusetts (Opening Round)		L 2–6	1,323	12–16–8
*Non-conference game. ^{#}Rankings from USCHO.com Poll. All times are in Eastern Time.

== Rankings ==
Legend
	Improvement in ranking
	Drop in ranking
	Not ranked previous week
	No change in ranking from previous week
RV	Received votes but were not ranked in Top 20/15 of poll

Week
	Pre	1	2	3	4	5	6	7	8	9	10	11	12	13	14	15	16	17	18	19	20	21	22	23	Final
USCHO		RV	RV	RV				RV																	
USA Today				RV																					
