= 2017 ECAC Hockey men's ice hockey tournament =

2017 ECAC Men's ice hockey tournament
- Dates: March 3–18, 2017
- Teams: 12
- Finals site: Herb Brooks Arena; Lake Placid, New York
- Champions: Harvard (10th title)
- Winning coach: Ted Donato (3rd title)
- MVP: Merrick Madsen (Harvard)
- ECAC Men's Ice Hockey Tournaments

The 2017 ECAC Hockey Men's Ice Hockey Tournament is the 56th tournament in league history. It was played between March 3 and March 18, 2017. First Round and Quarterfinal games were played at home team campus sites, while the final four games were played at the Herb Brooks Arena in Lake Placid, New York. By winning the tournament, the team receives the ECAC's automatic bid to the 2017 NCAA Division I Men's Ice Hockey Tournament.

== Format ==
The tournament features four rounds of play. The teams that finish above fifth place in the standings receive a bye to the quarterfinal round. In the first round, the fifth and twelfth seeds, the sixth and eleventh seeds, the seventh and tenth seeds and the eighth and ninth seeds played a best-of-three series with the winners advancing to the quarterfinals. In the quarterfinals the one seed plays the lowest remaining seed, the second seed plays the second-lowest remaining seed, the third seed plays the third-lowest remaining seed and the fourth seed plays the fourth-lowest remaining seed another best-of-three series with the winners of these the series advancing to the Semifinals. In the semifinals the top remaining seed plays the lowest remaining seed while the two remaining teams play against each other. The winners of the semifinals play in the championship game, and no third-place game is played. All series after the quarterfinals are single-elimination games. The tournament champion receives an automatic bid to the 2017 NCAA Division I Men's Ice Hockey Tournament.

== Conference standings ==
Note: GP = Games played; W = Wins; L = Losses; T = Ties; PTS = Points; GF = Goals For; GA = Goals Against

2016–17 ECAC Hockey men's standings
	Conference record							Overall record					
	GP	W	L	T	PTS	GF	GA	GP	W	L	T	GF	GA
#3 Harvard†*	22	16	4	2	34	85	47	36	28	6	2	146	77
#11 Union†	22	16	4	2	34	87	56	38	25	10	3	143	113
#13 Cornell	22	13	4	5	31	70	51	35	21	9	5	99	81
St. Lawrence	22	12	6	4	28	61	44	37	17	13	7	104	88
#20 Quinnipiac	22	13	8	1	27	69	55	40	23	15	2	121	101
Clarkson	22	10	9	3	23	67	62	39	18	16	5	124	112
Princeton	22	8	11	3	19	63	75	34	15	16	3	103	111
Yale	22	7	11	4	18	62	67	33	13	15	5	99	98
Dartmouth	22	7	13	2	16	59	80	31	10	18	3	83	111
Colgate	22	6	13	3	15	40	62	37	9	22	6	78	113
Rensselaer	22	6	16	0	12	52	76	37	8	28	1	83	138
Brown	22	3	18	1	7	47	87	31	4	25	2	66	132
Championship: March 18, 2017 † indicates conference regular season champion (Cleary Cup) * indicates conference tournament champion (Whitelaw Cup); Rankings: USCHO.com Top 20 Poll; updated March 6, 2017

== Bracket ==
Teams are reseeded after the First Round and Quarterfinals

First Round; March 3–5
5	Quinnipiac	6	5	-
12	Brown	1	1	-
6	Clarkson	7	4	-
11	Rensselaer	4	2	-
7	Princeton	2	4*	2
10	Colgate	3*	3	1
8	Yale	6	3*	-
9	Dartmouth	1	2	-

Quarterfinals; March 10–12
1	Harvard	6	4	-
8	Yale	4	3	-
2	Union	4	4*	-
7	Princeton	1	3	-
3	Cornell	2	2	2
6	Clarkson	6	1	1
4	St. Lawrence	2	1	2
5	Quinnipiac	0	3	3

Semifinals; March 17
1	Harvard	4
5	Quinnipiac	1
2	Union	1
3	Cornell	4

Championship; March 18
1	Harvard	4
3	Cornell	1

Note: * denotes overtime period(s)

== Media ==
=== Television ===
ASN had the television rights to semifinals and championship game during the tournament.

=== Streaming ===
Every game during the tournament was streamed through the ECAC Hockey's website.
