= Mike Cavanaugh =

American ice hockey coach and player (born 1968)

Current position
- Title: Head coach
- Team: Connecticut
- Conference: Hockey East
- Record: 163–180–38 (.478)

Biographical details
- Born: June 7, 1968 (age 58); North Andover, Massachusetts, U.S.
- Education: Bowdoin College

Playing career
- 1987–1990: Bowdoin
- 1990–1991: Richmond Flyers
- 1994: Pittsburgh Phantoms
- Position: Forward

Coaching career (HC unless noted)
- 1990–1991: Richmond Flyers (player-coach)
- 1991–1992: Belmont Hill School (assistant)
- 1992–1993: Bowling Green (graduate assistant)
- 1993–1995: Dartmouth (assistant)
- 1995–2013: Boston College (assistant)
- 2013–present: Connecticut

Head coaching record
- Overall: 181–194–42 (.484)
- Tournaments: 1–1 (.500)

Accomplishments and honors

Championships
- As an assistant coach 4× National Champion (2001, 2008, 2010, 2012)

Awards
- Bob Kullen Coach of the Year Award (2025); Terry Flanagan Award (2013)

Mike Cavanaugh (born June 7, 1968) is an American ice hockey coach and former player. Cavanaugh was an assistant at Boston College for 18 seasons before being named as Bruce Marshall's successor at Connecticut in the spring of 2013.

== Head coaching record ==
Record table
Season	Team	Overall	Conference	Standing	Postseason
Connecticut Huskies (Atlantic Hockey) (2013–2014)
2013–14	Connecticut	18–14–4	15–9–3	t–3rd	Atlantic Hockey Quarterfinals
Connecticut:		18–14–4 (.556)	15–9–3 (.611)		
Connecticut Huskies (Hockey East) (2014–present)
2014–15	Connecticut	10–19–7	7–11–4	t-9th	Hockey East Opening Round
2015–16	Connecticut	11–21–4	6–12–4	8th	Hockey East Opening Round
2016–17	Connecticut	12–16–8	8–10–4	9th	Hockey East Opening Round
2017–18	Connecticut	15–19–2	11–12–1	5th	Hockey East Quarterfinals
2018–19	Connecticut	12–20–2	7–15–2	9th	
2019–20	Connecticut	15–15–4	12–10–2	5th	Tournament cancelled
2020–21	Connecticut	10–11–2	10–10–2	4th	Hockey East Quarterfinals
2021–22	Connecticut	20–16–0	14–10–0	T–4th	Hockey East Runner-Up
2022–23	Connecticut	20–12–3	13–9–2	4th	Hockey East Quarterfinals
2023–24	Connecticut	15–19–2	9–14–1	8th	Hockey East Quarterfinals
2024–25	Connecticut	23–12–4	12–8–4	4th	Allentown Regional Final
Connecticut:		163–180–38	94–102–23		
Total:		181–194–42 (.484)			
National champion Postseason invitational champion Conference regular season champion Conference regular season and conference tournament champion Division regular season champion Division regular season and conference tournament champion Conference tournament champion
