= 2016–17 Boston College Eagles men's ice hockey season =

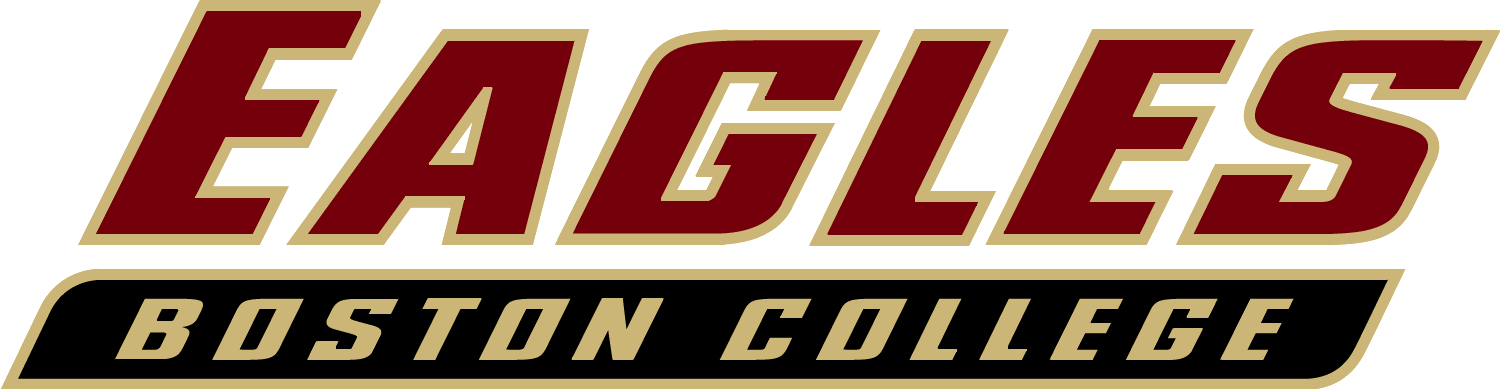

Hockey East Co-Regular Season Champions, (Shared with UMass Lowell and Boston University)
- Conference: T-1st Hockey East
- Home ice: Kelley Rink

Rankings
- USCHO.com/CBS College Sports: #16 (Final)
- USA Today/USA Hockey Magazine: RV (Final)

Record
- Overall: 21–15–4 (13–6–3)
- Home: 10–4–2
- Road: 9–5–1
- Neutral: 2–6–1

Coaches and captains
- Head coach: Jerry York
- Assistant coaches: Greg Brown; Mike Ayers; Marty McInnis
- Captain: Chris Calnan
- Alternate captain(s): Ryan Fitzgerald; Austin Cangelosi

The 2016–17 Boston College Eagles men's ice hockey team represented Boston College in the 2016–17 NCAA Division I men's ice hockey season. The team was coached by Jerry York, '67, his twenty-third season behind the bench at Boston College. The Eagles played their home games at Kelley Rink on the campus of Boston College, competing in Hockey East.

The Eagles competed in three tournaments during the 2016–17 season, the first of which took place during the traditional opening of the college hockey season at the 20th annual Ice Breaker Classic. Played on October 7 and 8 at Magness Arena in Denver, Colorado, the tournament showcased the Eagles playing Air Force in the first round, where they would lose a tight 2–1 match. Boston College faced host Denver in the consolation round, picking up a 3–1 victory for their first win of the season. Air Force would defeat Ohio State in the championship. The Eagles had previously won the ice breaker tournament three times; making their fifth appearance this season. The second tournament of the season took place during the holiday break, where the Eagles made the trip to the PPG Paints Arena in Pittsburgh, Pennsylvania for their second appearance in the Three Rivers Classic in its fifth annual year. The Eagles fell 3–1 to the Quinnipiac Bobcats in the opening round, but picked up the 3rd-place result against Ferris State in the consolation round, winning the (unofficial) shootout of the (official) 1–1 tie. Boston College previously won the title in their first appearance at the tournament in 2012. For their final tournament of the season, the Eagles played in the 65th Annual Beanpot Tournament at the TD Garden in Boston, Massachusetts on February 6 and 13. Boston College lost to rival Boston University 3–1 in the opening round (suffering their first season sweep against the Terriers since 1994–95), and were defeated by Northeastern 2–4 in the consolation game, marking the first 4th-place finish for the Eagles since 1993 and the first of Jerry York's tenure.

The Eagles finished the season 21–15–5, and 13–6–3 in conference play, earning a share of the regular season title (shared with Boston University and UMass Lowell). They advanced to the Championship of the Hockey East tournament, but would fall to the UMass Lowell River Hawks by a score of 4–3. The Eagles failed to qualify for the NCAA Tournament, having just missed the mark to earn an at-large bid; the Eagles missed out on the tournament for the first time since 2009.

== Previous season recap ==
The Eagles entered the 2016–17 season following the school's record 25th trip to the Frozen Four in Tampa, Florida, where they would fall to Quinnipiac for the second year in the row. Additionally they fell in the semifinals of the Hockey East Tournament to Beanpot rival, Northeastern, who eventually won the title. The Eagles captured two trophies during the 2015–16 season, winning the Beanpot with a 1–0 OT victory over Boston University, and captured a share of the Hockey East regular season title (shared with Providence) off a strong 28–8–5 record and 15–2–5 in conference play.

== Departures ==
Four Senior Eagles graduated in May:

- Teddy Doherty – D ^{(Captain)}
- Travis Jeke – D
- Brendan Silk – F
- Peter McMullen – F

Doherty and Jeke signed in the offseason with ECHL clubs, the Cincinnati Cyclones and the South Carolina Stingrays, respectively.

Seven Underclassmen left the program early to sign with their respective drafted teams in the NHL:

- Ian McCoshen – D ^{(Assistant Captain)} – Florida Panthers
- Steven Santini – D ^{(Assistant Captain)} – New Jersey Devils
- Adam Gilmour – F – Minnesota Wild
- Thatcher Demko – G – Vancouver Canucks
- Alex Tuch – F – Minnesota Wild
- Zach Sanford – F – Washington Capitals
- Miles Wood – F – New Jersey Devils

Additional:

- Josh Couturier left the program and transferred to UMass.
- Goalies Chris Birdsall, Alex Joyce, and Charlie van Kula were not retained on the official roster, however they may remain available on emergency basis.

== Recruiting ==
Boston College adds thirteen freshmen for the 2016–17 season: seven forwards, four defensemen, and two goalies.

- Mike Booth, F – Recorded 82 points in two seasons playing for the South Shore Kings of the USHL.
- Michael Campoli, D – Played alongside incoming Eagles McPhee, Walker and Woll with the US U-18 team.
- David Cotton, F – Selected by the Carolina Hurricanes with the 169th overall pick in the 6th round of the 2015 NHL Draft. Scored 30 points playing for the Waterloo Black Hawks of the USHL.
- Ryan Edquist, G – Posted a .906 SVG and 3.02 GAA playing for the Madison Capitals of the USHL and was named to the USHL All-Rookie team.
- Ron Greco, F – Scored 154 points over three seasons playing for the Philadelphia Junior Flyers of the USPHL, tallying 57 points in his final year and became the team's all-time leader in points scored.
- Julius Mattila, F – Scored 56 points in 46 games as he led his team to the Finnish junior league championship and was named second-team All Star. Played for Finland in the 2014–15 U-18 World Junior tournament, winning a silver medal.
- Jesper Mattila, D – Playing alongside his twin Julius, Jesper scored 37 points as a defenseman in 46 games, and was named first-team All Star. Also helped win a silver medal for Finland at the 2014–15 U–18 World Juniors.
- Luke McInnis, D – Son of assistant coach Marty McInnis, Luke scored 28 points for the Youngstown Phantoms of the USHL last year, getting named to the second All-Rookie team.
- Graham McPhee, F – Selected by the Edmonton Oilers with the 149th overall pick in the 5th round of the 2016 NHL entry draft. Graham is the son of George McPhee, the general manager for the Vegas Golden Knights. He scored 18 points playing alongside Campoli, Walker and Woll for the US U-18 team and won a bronze medal for the United States at the U-18 World Juniors in 2015–16.
- Mike Merulla, F – Scored 55 points in 48 games for the Aston Rebels of the NAHL, leading his team in scoring.
- Connor Moore, D – Notched 33 points as a defenseman playing for the Youngstown Phantoms of the USHL.
- Zach Walker, F – Played alongside Campoli, McPhee and Woll for the US U-18 team, scoring 13 points and helped secure the bronze medal for the US at the U-18 World Juniors.
- Joe Woll, G – Selected by the Toronto Maple Leafs with the 62nd overall pick in the 3rd round of the 2016 NHL Draft. Woll will likely compete for the starting job after Demko's departure. Woll posted a .918 SVG and 2.14 GAA in 33 games for the US U-18 team. He also backstopped the US to a bronze medal at the 2015–16 U-18 World Juniors.

Player	Position	Nationality	Notes
Mike Booth	Forward	United States	Cary, IL; Played for the South Shore Kings of the EJHL.
Michael Campoli	Defenseman	United States/Canada	Pointe-Claire, QC; Played for the US-NTDP of the USHL.
David Cotton	Forward	United States	Parker, TX; Selected 169th overall by CAR in the 2015 Draft
Ryan Edquist	Goalie	United States	Lakeville, MN; Played for the Madison Capitals of the USHL.
Ron Greco	Forward	United States	Philadelphia, PA; Played for the Philadelphia Junior Flyers of the USPHL.
Julius Mattila	Forward	Finland	Tampere, Finland; Played for the Ilves U20 in Finland's Jr. A SM-liiga league.
Jesper Mattila	Defenseman	Finland	Tampere, Finland; Played for the Ilves U20 in Finland's Jr. A SM-liiga league.
Luke McInnis	Defenseman	United States	Hingham, MA; Played for the Youngstown Phantoms of the USHL.
Graham McPhee	Forward	United States/Canada	Bethesda, MD; Selected 149th overall by EDM in the 2016 Draft.
Mike Merulla	Forward	United States	Kennett Square, PA; Played for the Aston Rebels of the NAHL.
Connor Moore	Defenseman	United States	Cumming, GA; Played for the Youngstown Phantoms of the USHL.
Zach Walker	Forward	United States	Boise, ID; Played for the US-NTDP of the USHL.
Joseph Woll	Goalie	United States	Dardenne Prairie, MO; Selected 62nd overall by TOR in the 2016 Draft.

== 2016–2017 roster ==
=== 2016–17 Eagles ===
As of September 13, 2016.

No.	Nat.	Player	Class	Pos	Height	Weight	DoB	Hometown	Previous team	NHL rights
2		Scott Savage	Senior	D	6' 1" (1.85 m)	186 lb (84 kg)	1995-04-11	San Clemente, California	USNTDP (USHL)	—
3		Luke McInnis	Freshman	D	5' 11" (1.8 m)	175 lb (79 kg)	1998-07-29	Hingham, Massachusetts	Youngstown (USHL)	—
4		Michael Kim	Sophomore	D	6' 0" (1.83 m)	185 lb (84 kg)	1995-06-28	Toronto, Ontario	Boston (USPHL)	—
5		Casey Fitzgerald	Sophomore	D	5' 11" (1.8 m)	185 lb (84 kg)	1997-02-25	North Reading, Massachusetts	USNTDP (USHL)	BUF, 86th overall 2016
6		Michael Campoli	Freshman	D	6' 2" (1.88 m)	195 lb (88 kg)	1998-01-21	Pointe-Claire, Quebec	USNTDP (USHL)	—
7		Connor Moore	Freshman	D	5' 10" (1.78 m)	175 lb (79 kg)	1997-07-04	Cumming, Georgia	Youngstown (USHL)	—
8		Jesper Mattila	Freshman	D	5' 10" (1.78 m)	180 lb (82 kg)	1997-10-09	Tampere, Finland	Ilves U20 (Nuorten SM-liiga)	—
9		Austin Cangelosi (A)	Senior	F	5' 7" (1.7 m)	173 lb (78 kg)	1994-08-27	Estero, Florida	Youngstown (USHL)	—
10		Christopher Brown	Sophomore	F	6' 0" (1.83 m)	185 lb (84 kg)	1996-02-22	Bloomfield Hills, Michigan	Tri-City (USHL)	BUF, 151st overall 2014
11		Chris Calnan (C)	Senior	F	6' 2" (1.88 m)	209 lb (95 kg)	1994-05-05	Norwell, Massachusetts	South Shore (EJHL)	CHI, 79th overall 2012
12		Mike Booth	Freshman	F	5' 11" (1.8 m)	187 lb (85 kg)	1996-03-20	Cary, Illinois	South Shore (USPHL)	—
14		Zach Walker	Freshman	F	6' 0" (1.83 m)	200 lb (91 kg)	1998-08-02	Boise, Idaho	USNTDP (USHL)	—
15		J. D. Dudek	Sophomore	F	5' 11" (1.8 m)	185 lb (84 kg)	1996-01-29	Auburn, New Hampshire	Chicago (USHL)	NJD, 152nd overall 2014
17		David Cotton	Freshman	F	6' 3" (1.91 m)	204 lb (93 kg)	1997-07-09	Parker, Texas	Waterloo (USHL)	CAR, 169th overall 2015
18		Colin White	Sophomore	F	6' 0" (1.83 m)	195 lb (88 kg)	1997-01-30	Hanover, Massachusetts	USNTDP (USHL)	OTT, 21st overall 2015
19		Ryan Fitzgerald (A)	Senior	F	5' 11" (1.8 m)	195 lb (88 kg)	1994-10-19	North Reading, Massachusetts	Valley (EJHL)	BOS, 120th overall 2013
20		Mike Merulla	Freshman	F	6' 0" (1.83 m)	194 lb (88 kg)	1996-01-26	Kennett Square, Pennsylvania	Aston (NAHL)	—
21		Matthew Gaudreau	Senior	F	5' 9" (1.75 m)	145 lb (66 kg)	1994-12-05	Carneys Point, New Jersey	Omaha (USHL)	—
23		Chris Shero	Sophomore	F	5' 10" (1.78 m)	185 lb (84 kg)	1995-10-02	Pittsburgh, Pennsylvania	South Shore (USPHL)	—
26		Julius Mattila	Freshman	F	5' 10" (1.78 m)	160 lb (73 kg)	1997-10-09	Tampere, Finland	Ilves U20 (Nuorten SM-liiga)	—
27		Graham McPhee	Freshman	F	5' 11" (1.8 m)	174 lb (79 kg)	1998-07-24	Bethesda, Maryland	USNTDP (USHL)	EDM, 149th overall 2016
28		Ron Greco	Freshman	F	5' 10" (1.78 m)	170 lb (77 kg)	1995-03-20	Philadelphia, Pennsylvania	Philadelphia (USPHL)	—
29		Ian Milosz	Sophomore	G	6' 7" (2.01 m)	195 lb (88 kg)	1995-05-08	North Grafton, Massachusetts	Boston (USPHL)	—
31		Joseph Woll	Freshman	G	6' 3" (1.91 m)	193 lb (88 kg)	1998-07-12	Dardenne Prairie, Missouri	USNTDP (USHL)	TOR, 62nd overall 2016
35		Ryan Edquist	Freshman	G	6' 0" (1.83 m)	165 lb (75 kg)	1998-01-28	Lakeville, Minnesota	Madison (USHL)	—

=== Coaching staff ===
Name	Position	Seasons at Boston College	Alma mater
Jerry York	Head Coach	23	Boston College (1967)
Greg Brown	Associate Head Coach	13	Boston College (1990)
Mike Ayers	Assistant coach	4	University of New Hampshire (2004)
Marty McInnis	Assistant coach	4	Boston College (1992)

== Standings ==
2016–17 Hockey East men's standings
	Conference record							Overall record					
	GP	W	L	T	PTS	GF	GA	GP	W	L	T	GF	GA
#4 Massachusetts–Lowell†*	22	14	7	1	29	76	51	41	27	11	3	151	95
#6 Boston University†	22	13	6	3	29	64	47	39	24	12	3	123	90
#16 Boston College†	22	13	6	3	29	74	56	40	21	15	4	132	104
#5 Notre Dame	22	12	6	4	28	67	51	40	23	12	5	128	93
#15 Providence	22	12	7	3	27	66	57	39	22	12	5	116	92
#18 Vermont	22	10	8	4	24	61	63	38	20	13	5	122	106
Merrimack	22	8	8	6	22	57	60	37	15	16	6	90	96
Northeastern	22	9	10	3	21	73	71	38	18	15	5	140	113
Connecticut	22	8	10	4	20	55	61	36	12	16	8	96	104
New Hampshire	22	7	11	4	18	69	77	40	15	20	5	124	136
Maine	22	5	15	2	12	57	79	36	11	21	4	102	125
Massachusetts	22	2	19	1	5	42	88	36	5	29	2	66	132
Championship: March 18, 2017 † indicates conference regular season champion; * indicates conference tournament champion Rankings: USCHO.com Top 20 Poll; updated March 6, 2017

== Schedule ==
=== Regular season ===
Date	Time	Opponent^{#}	Rank^{#}	Site	TV	Result	Attendance	Record
Exhibition
October 2	2:30 pm	Carleton*	#5	Warrior Ice Arena • Brighton, Massachusetts		W 4–3	493	0–0–0
Regular Season
October 7	4:35 pm	vs. Air Force*	#5	Magness Arena • Denver, Colorado (Ice Breaker)		L 1–2	3,984	0–1–0
October 8	7:30 pm	at #3 Denver*	#5	Magness Arena • Denver, Colorado (Ice Breaker)		W 3–1	4,286	1–1–0
October 14	7:00 pm	at Wisconsin*	#6	Kohl Center • Madison, Wisconsin	Fox Sports Wisconsin	L 1–3	8,028	1–2–0
October 16	4:00 pm	at Wisconsin*	#6	Kohl Center • Madison, Wisconsin	ESPNU	W 8–5	8,635	2–2–0
October 21	7:00 pm	Colorado College*	#10	Kelley Rink • Chestnut Hill, Massachusetts		W 4–1	5,263	3–2–0
October 22	7:05 pm	at Holy Cross*	#10	DCU Center • Worcester, Massachusetts		W 6–1	3,884	4–2–0
October 25	7:05 pm	at Merrimack	#8	Lawler Arena • North Andover, Massachusetts		T 2–2 ^{OT}	2,321	4–2–1 (0–0–1)
October 28	6:00 pm	#14 Providence	#8	Kelley Rink • Chestnut Hill, Massachusetts	ASN/NESN	W 3–1	5,019	5–2–1 (1–0–1)
October 29	7:00 pm	at Massachusetts	#8	Mullins Center • Amherst, Massachusetts		W 7–4	3,016	6–2–1 (2–0–1)
November 4	7:00 pm	at Maine	#5	Cross Insurance Arena • Portland, Maine		W 6–1	4,621	7–2–1 (3–0–1)
November 5	7:30 pm	at Maine	#5	Alfond Arena • Orono, Maine		W 3–2	5,125	8–2–1 (4–0–1)
November 8	7:00 pm	New Hampshire	#3	Kelley Rink • Chestnut Hill, Massachusetts		W 5–3	3,028	9–2–1 (5–0–1)
November 13	3:00 pm	Arizona State*	#3	Kelley Rink • Chestnut Hill, Massachusetts		W 3–1	4,440	10–2–1
November 18	7:00 pm	at #11 Harvard*	#3	Bright Hockey Center • Cambridge, Massachusetts		L 2–5	3,095	10–3–1
November 22	7:05 pm	at Connecticut	#4	XL Center • Hartford, Connecticut		W 5–2	5,127	11–3–1 (6–0–1)
November 27	1:00 pm	#11 Minnesota*	#4	Kelley Rink • Chestnut Hill, Massachusetts		L 2–4	5,154	11–4–1
November 29	7:00 pm	at Northeastern	#3	Matthews Arena • Boston, Massachusetts		W 2–1	1,920	12–4–1 (7–0–1)
December 3	7:30 pm	vs. #9 North Dakota*	#3	Madison Square Garden • New York, New York	CBS Sports Network	L 3–4	11,348	12–5–1
December 6	7:00 pm	Northeastern	#4	Kelley Rink • Chestnut Hill, Massachusetts		W 5–3	3,777	13–5–1 (8–0–1)
December 10	7:05 pm	at #14 Notre Dame	#4	Compton Family Ice Arena • South Bend, Indiana (Holy War on Ice)	NBCSN	L 2–3	5,022	13–6–1 (8–1–1)
December 29	4:30 pm	vs. #14 Quinnipiac*	#6	PPG Paints Arena • Pittsburgh, Pennsylvania (Three Rivers Classic)		L 1–3	3,526	13–7–1
December 30	4:30 pm	vs. Ferris State*	#6	PPG Paints Arena • Pittsburgh, Pennsylvania (Three Rivers Classic)		T 1–1 ^{OT}	4,164	13–7–2
January 8 ^{(PPnd. from 1/7)}	5:00 pm	vs. Providence	#8	Fenway Park • Boston, Massachusetts (Frozen Fenway)	NESN+	W 3–1	19,547	14–7–2 (9–1–1)
January 13	7:35 pm	at #5 Boston University	#8	Agganis Arena • Boston, Massachusetts (Green Line Rivalry)		L 1–2	6,150	14–8–2 (9–2–1)
January 16	7:00 pm	#3 Boston University	#10	Kelley Rink • Chestnut Hill, Massachusetts (Green Line Rivalry)	ASN/NESN	L 0–3	7,884	14–9–2 (9–3–1)
January 20	7:00 pm	Massachusetts	#10	Kelley Rink • Chestnut Hill, Massachusetts		W 6–1	5,358	15–9–2 (10–3–1)
January 24	7:00 pm	Connecticut	#13	Kelley Rink • Chestnut Hill, Massachusetts		W 2–1	3,252	16–9–2 (11–3–1)
January 28	7:00 pm	#15 Notre Dame	#13	Kelley Rink • Chestnut Hill, Massachusetts (Holy War on Ice)		W 6–4	7,884	17–9–2 (12–3–1)
February 3	7:00 pm	at New Hampshire	#8	Whittemore Center • Durham, New Hampshire	ESPN3	W 6–4	6,149	18–9–2 (13–3–1)
February 6	8:00 pm	vs. #3 Boston University*	#7	TD Garden • Boston, Massachusetts (Beanpot, Green Line Rivalry)	NESN	L 1–3	15,299	18–10–2
February 10	6:00 pm	Merrimack	#7	Kelley Rink • Chestnut Hill, Massachusetts	ASN/NESN	L 3–6	4,217	18–11–2 (13–4–1)
February 13	4:30 pm	vs. Northeastern*	#11	TD Garden • Boston, Massachusetts (Beanpot)	NESN	L 2–4	15,941	18–12–2
February 17	7:00 pm	#16 Vermont	#11	Kelley Rink • Chestnut Hill, Massachusetts		T 3–3 ^{OT}	4,175	18–12–3 (13–4–2)
February 18	7:00 pm	#16 Vermont	#11	Kelley Rink • Chestnut Hill, Massachusetts		T 2–2 ^{OT}	5,467	18–12–4 (13–4–3)
February 23	7:00 pm	#5 UMass Lowell	#14	Kelley Rink • Chestnut Hill, Massachusetts		L 1–4	4,306	18–13–4 (13–5–3)
February 24	8:30 pm	at #5 UMass Lowell	#14	Tsongas Center • Lowell, Massachusetts	ASN/NESN	L 1–3	6,580	18–14–4 (13–6–3)
Hockey East Tournament
March 10	7:00 pm	#13 Vermont*	#17	Kelley Rink • Chestnut Hill, Massachusetts (Quarterfinals)		W 7–0	2,463	19–14–4
March 11	7:00 pm	#13 Vermont*	#17	Kelley Rink • Chestnut Hill, Massachusetts (Quarterfinals)		W 7–4	3,102	20–14–4
March 17	8:00 pm	vs. #7 Boston University*	#14	TD Garden • Boston, Massachusetts (Semifinals, Green Line Rivalry)	NESN/ESPN3	W 3–2	10,979	21–14–4
March 18	7:00 pm	vs. #4 UMass Lowell*	#14	TD Garden • Boston, Massachusetts (Finals)	NESN/ESPN3	L 3–4	12,309	21–15–4
*Non-conference game. ^{#}Rankings from USCHO.com Poll. All times are in Eastern Time.

- Preseason polls ranked the Eagles #5 (USCHO) and #9 (USA Today) nationally, and the Hockey East Coaches Poll ranked Boston College 6th in the conference.
- On December 6, five Eagles were named to preliminary rosters of national teams competing at the 2017 World Juniors, three for the United States (D - Casey Fitzgerald, F - Colin White and G - Joe Woll) and two for Finland (D - Jesper Mattila and F - Julius Mattila). All five would survive cuts to their respective final rosters.
- During the Eagles trip to Pittsburgh to play in the Three Rivers Classic, the three Eagles representing the United States at the World Juniors won a gold medal after defeating Canada in the championship match in a stunning shootout. Colin White finished the tournament 8th in points scored (8) and 2nd in goals scored (7) while Joe Woll secured two victories for the US in the preliminary round. The Mattila twins would help Finland stave off relegation.
- The five competing Eagles rejoined the team on January 8 to play at Frozen Fenway against Providence, which was postponed a day later from the 7th due to snowy conditions. Ryan Fitzgerald also made a comeback after healing from injury and missing the holiday tournament in Pittsburgh. The Eagles would win their 3rd victory at Fenway Park all time with a 3–1 defeat of the Friars.
- On February 25, with a Notre Dame loss to Boston University, the Eagles finished in a three-way tie for first place in the conference standings at the end of the season, sharing the title of Regular Season Champs with UMass Lowell and Boston University.
- The Eagles season came to an end at the Hockey East tournament Championship, where they fell to the River Hawks 4–3. Without an auto-bid into the NCAA tournament, the Eagles would fail to qualify for an at-large bid via the pairwise ranking as the first team out; their first season without competing since 2009. The title game was the 17th appearance for the Eagles and first since 2012.
- Several Eagles signed with professional teams in the offseason:
  - Senior Matthew Guadreau with the Bridgeport Sound Tigers of the AHL on a tryout.
  - Senior Scott Savage with the Cleveland Monsters of the AHL on a tryout.
  - Senior Ryan Fitzgerald with his drafted team, the Boston Bruins of the NHL.
  - Senior Austin Cangelosi with the Albany Devils of the AHL.
  - Sophomore Colin White with his drafted team, the Ottawa Senators of the NHL.

== Rankings ==
Poll	Week																									
Poll	Pre	1	2	3	4	5	6	7	8	9	10	11	12	13	14	15	16	17	18	19	20	21	22	23	24	Final
USCHO.com	5	6	10	8	5	3	3	4	3	4	5	6	8	8	10	13	8	7	11	14	17	17	14	16	—	16
USA Today	9	9	10	8	5	3	3	3	4	3	4	5	8	8	10	11	8	7	11	13	RV	RV	15	RV	RV	RV

== Statistics ==
=== Skaters ===
No.	Player	POS	YR	GP	G	A	Pts	PIM	PP	SHG	GWG	+/-	SOG
2	Scott Savage	D	SR	40	5	24	29	24	1	0	0	+17	88
3	Luke McInnis	D	FR	35	3	7	10	37	0	0	1	+3	53
4	Michael Kim	D	SO	40	5	16	21	20	1	1	1	+18	99
5	Casey Fitzgerald	D	SO	37	5	17	22	46	2	0	2	+7	53
6	Michael Campoli	D	FR	12	0	1	1	6	0	0	0	+7	9
7	Connor Moore	D	FR	40	1	12	13	24	0	0	0	+17	30
8	Jesper Mattila	D	FR	34	2	7	9	24	0	0	0	E	37
9	Austin Cangelosi	F	SR	39	21	14	35	26	7	3	3	+17	86
10	Chris Brown	F	SO	34	9	17	26	12	2	1	1	+19	84
11	Chris Calnan	F	SR	39	6	10	16	45	1	0	1	E	70
12	Mike Booth	F	FR	37	2	4	6	14	0	0	1	E	30
14	Zach Walker	F	FR	32	2	5	7	27	0	0	0	+3	13
15	JD Dudek	F	SO	40	13	9	22	28	3	1	3	+10	101
17	David Cotton	F	FR	40	10	14	24	16	4	0	4	+10	95
18	Colin White	F	SO	35	16	17	33	46	6	0	1	+8	104
19	Ryan Fitzgerald	F	SR	34	12	19	31	56	0	2	1	+14	132
20	Mike Merulla	F	FR	3	0	0	0	0	0	0	0	E	0
21	Matt Gaudreau	F	SR	40	8	27	35	54	0	1	1	+11	79
23	Chris Shero	F	FR	3	0	0	0	4	0	0	0	E	0
26	Julius Mattila	F	FR	30	8	8	16	4	1	1	1	+2	74
27	Graham McPhee	F	FR	39	2	8	10	42	0	1	0	+1	53
28	Ron Greco	F	FR	35	2	2	4	31	0	0	0	–1	29
29	Ian Milosz	G	SO	0	0	0	0	0	0	0	0	E	0
31	Joe Woll	G	FR	34	0	0	0	2	0	0	0	+27	0
35	Ryan Edquist	G	FR	8	0	0	0	0	0	0	0	+9	0
	Bench							14					
	Team			40	132	238	370	602	28	11	21	+36	1319

=== Goaltenders ===
No.	Player	YR	GS	GP	MIN	W	L	T	GA	GAA	SA	SV	SV%	SO
29	Ian Milosz	SO	0	0	0:00	0	0	0	0	0.00	0	0	1.00	0
31	Joe Woll	FR	34	34	1976:53	17	13	3	87	2.64	999	912	0.913	1
25	Ryan Edquist	FR	6	8	427:44	4	2	1	13	1.82	168	155	0.923	0
	Empty Net			25	15:23				4		4			
	Team		40	40	2420:00	21	15	4	104	2.58	1171	1067	0.911	1

== Awards and honors ==
Hockey East Awards

- Austin Cangelosi, F - Best Defensive Forward

Hockey East All Stars

- Joe Woll, G – All-Rookie Team, Honorable Mention
- Scott Savage, D – All-Third Team
- Austin Cangelosi, F – All-Third Team

Hockey East All-Tournament Team

- Ryan Fitzgerald, Forward
- Scott Savage, Defenseman

Hockey East Player of the Week

- Austin Cangelosi, F – Week of November 7, 2016, Week of March 13, 2017

Hockey East Rookie of the Week

- Joe Woll, G – Week of January 30, 2017
