= 2017 Hockey East men's ice hockey tournament =

2017 Hockey East Men's ice hockey tournament
- Dates: March 3–18, 2017
- Teams: 12
- Finals site: TD Garden; Boston
- Champions: Massachusetts–Lowell (3rd title)
- Winning coach: Norm Bazin (3rd title)
- MVP: C. J. Smith (UMass Lowell)
- Hockey East Men's Ice Hockey Tournaments

The 2017 Hockey East Men's Ice Hockey Tournament was the 33rd tournament in the history of the conference. It was played between March 3 and March 18, 2017 at campus locations and at the TD Garden in Boston, Massachusetts. The Massachusetts–Lowell River Hawks defeated the Boston College Eagles by a score of 4–3 to earn their 3rd Hockey East championship in school history, the third in five years, and earn Hockey East's automatic bid into the 2017 NCAA Division I Men's Ice Hockey Tournament. C. J. Smith was named tournament MVP.

== Format ==
The tournament included all twelve teams in the conference. Seeds 1–4 earned a first-round bye, and seeds 5–12 played a best-of-three Opening Round played on campus locations. Winners advanced to play the 1–4 seeds in the best-of-three Quarterfinals on campus locations. Winners of those series played in a single-game Semifinal, and those winners faced off in a single-game Championship Final, both at the TD Garden.

=== Regular season standings ===
Note: GP = Games played; W = Wins; L = Losses; T = Ties; PTS = Points; GF = Goals For; GA = Goals Against

2016–17 Hockey East men's standings
| | Conference record | | | | | | | Overall record | | | | | |
| | GP | W | L | T | PTS | GF | GA | GP | W | L | T | GF | GA |
|---|---|---|---|---|---|---|---|---|---|---|---|---|---|
| #4 Massachusetts–Lowell†* | 22 | 14 | 7 | 1 | 29 | 76 | 51 | 41 | 27 | 11 | 3 | 151 | 95 |
| #6 Boston University† | 22 | 13 | 6 | 3 | 29 | 64 | 47 | 39 | 24 | 12 | 3 | 123 | 90 |
| #16 Boston College† | 22 | 13 | 6 | 3 | 29 | 74 | 56 | 40 | 21 | 15 | 4 | 132 | 104 |
| #5 Notre Dame | 22 | 12 | 6 | 4 | 28 | 67 | 51 | 40 | 23 | 12 | 5 | 128 | 93 |
| #15 Providence | 22 | 12 | 7 | 3 | 27 | 66 | 57 | 39 | 22 | 12 | 5 | 116 | 92 |
| #18 Vermont | 22 | 10 | 8 | 4 | 24 | 61 | 63 | 38 | 20 | 13 | 5 | 122 | 106 |
| Merrimack | 22 | 8 | 8 | 6 | 22 | 57 | 60 | 37 | 15 | 16 | 6 | 90 | 96 |
| Northeastern | 22 | 9 | 10 | 3 | 21 | 73 | 71 | 38 | 18 | 15 | 5 | 140 | 113 |
| Connecticut | 22 | 8 | 10 | 4 | 20 | 55 | 61 | 36 | 12 | 16 | 8 | 96 | 104 |
| New Hampshire | 22 | 7 | 11 | 4 | 18 | 69 | 77 | 40 | 15 | 20 | 5 | 124 | 136 |
| Maine | 22 | 5 | 15 | 2 | 12 | 57 | 79 | 36 | 11 | 21 | 4 | 102 | 125 |
| Massachusetts | 22 | 2 | 19 | 1 | 5 | 42 | 88 | 36 | 5 | 29 | 2 | 66 | 132 |
Championship: March 18, 2017 † indicates conference regular season champion; * indicates conference tournament champion Rankings: USCHO.com Top 20 Poll; updated March 6, 2017

== Bracket ==
Teams are reseeded after the Opening Round and Quarterfinals

Opening Round; March 3–5
5 | Providence | 3 | 5 | —
12 | Massachusetts | 0 | 1 | —
6 | Vermont | 5 | 5 | —
11 | Maine | 0 | 1 | —
7 | Merrimack | 4 | 0 | 2
10 | New Hampshire | 0 | 4 | 5
8 | Northeastern | 3 | 6 | —
9 | Connecticut | 1 | 2 | —

Quarterfinals; March 10–12
1 | Massachusetts–Lowell | 1 | 3 | 8
10 | New Hampshire | 3 | 1 | 2
2 | Boston University | 3* | 3 | —
8 | Northeastern | 2 | 2 | —
3 | Boston College | 7 | 7 | —
6 | Vermont | 0 | 4 | —
4 | Notre Dame | 5 | 5 | —
5 | Providence | 0 | 2 | —

Semifinals; March 17
1 | Massachusetts–Lowell | 5
4 | Notre Dame | 1
2 | Boston University | 2
3 | Boston College | 3

Championship; March 18
1 | Massachusetts–Lowell | 4
3 | Boston College | 3

Note: * denotes overtime period(s)

== Results ==
=== Opening Round ===
==== (5) Providence vs. (12) Massachusetts ====
| March 3 | Providence | 3 - 0 | Massachusetts | Schneider Arena | Recap |
| (Wilkins, Foley) Brian Pinho - GW - 16:21 | | First period | No scoring |
| No scoring | | Second period | No scoring |
| (Foley, McKenzie) Josh Wilkins - 15:20 (Wilkins, Pinho) Erik Foley - 17:26 | | Third period | No scoring |
| ( 22 saves / 22 shots ) Hayden Hawkey | | Goalie stats | Ryan Wischow ( 32 saves / 35 shots ) |

| March 4 | Providence | 5 - 1 | Massachusetts | Schneider Arena | Recap |
| (Pinho, Monk) Scott Conway - PP - 08:54 | | First period | No scoring |
| (Bryson, Lemos) Vimal Sukumaran - GW - 02:05 (Monk, Kavanagh) Conor MacPhee - 15:04 | | Second period | No scoring |
| (Pinho, Foley) Josh Wilkins - 14:13 (Björkqvist, Gamez) Josh Monk - 18:39 | | Third period | 17:18 - Ray Pigozzi (Lagesson) |
| ( 20 saves / 20 shots ) Hayden Hawkey / ( 0 saves / 1 shots ) Brendan Leahy | | Goalie stats | Ryan Wischow ( 30 saves / 35 shots ) |

| Providence won series 2–0 |

==== (6) Vermont vs. (11) Maine ====
| March 3 | Vermont | 5 - 0 | Maine | Gutterson Fieldhouse | Recap |
| (Abramson, Muscoby) Liam Coughlin - GW - 03:27 (Blanleil, Bradley) Liam Coughlin - 09:15 (Shaw, Hamilton) Craig Puffer - 19:11 | | First period | No scoring |
| (Massie, Blanleil) Brendan Bradley - 12:40 | | Second period | No scoring |
| (Bowen, Phillips) Mario Puskarich - 02:29 | | Third period | No scoring |
| ( 31 saves / 31 shots ) Stefanos Lekkas | | Goalie stats | Rob McGovern ( 30 saves / 35 shots ) |

| March 4 | Vermont | 5 - 1 | Maine | Gutterson Fieldhouse | Recap |
| (Coughlin) Brendan Bradley - 06:33 (Bowen, Puskarich) Rob Hamilton - GW PP - 17:52 | | First period | No scoring |
| (Bradley, Bowen) Mario Puskarich - PP - 14:36 (Shaw, Privitera) Craig Puffer - 14:48 | | Second period | 06:55 - PP - Rob Michel (Byron, Brown) |
| (Best, Hamilton) Matt Alvaro - PP EN - 19:38 | | Third period | No scoring |
| ( 36 saves / 37 shots ) Stefanos Lekkas | | Goalie stats | Matt Morris ( 16 saves / 20 shots ) / Rob McGovern ( 8 saves / 8 shots ) |

| Vermont won series 2–0 |

==== (7) Merrimack vs. (10) New Hampshire ====
| March 3 | Merrimack | 4 - 0 | New Hampshire | J. Thom Lawler Rink | Recap |
| (Seney) Sami Tavernier - GW - 05:50 (Hennig, Kovacevic) Derek Petti - 15:16 | | First period | No scoring |
| (Hennig) Chris LeBlanc - 04:37 | | Second period | No scoring |
| (Kolquist, Larsson) Tyler Irvine - EN - 16:32 | | Third period | No scoring |
| ( 25 saves / 25 shots ) Collin Delia | | Goalie stats | Daniel Tirone ( 23 saves / 26 shots ) |

| March 4 | Merrimack | 0 - 4 | New Hampshire | J. Thom Lawler Rink | Recap |
| No Scoring | | First period | No scoring |
| No scoring | | Second period | 14:43 - GW - Patrick Grasso (Miller); 17:34 - PP - Jason Salvaggio (van Riemsdyk, McNicholas) |
| No scoring | | Third period | 18:48 - EN - Michael McNicholas (Nazarian, Kelleher); 19:22 - EN - Liam Blackburn (Tirone) |
| (LeBlanc, Biega) Ludvig Larsson - 12:02 | | Overtime | No scoring |
| ( 28 saves / 30 shots ) Collin Delia | | Goalie stats | Daniel Tirone ( 44 saves / 44 shots ) |

| March 5 | Merrimack | 2 - 5 | New Hampshire | J. Thom Lawler Rink | Recap |
| (Kolquist, Seney) Hampus Gustafsson - PP - 09:54 | | First period | 01:14 - Michael McNicholas (Kelleher, Salvaggio); 06:01 - Frankie Cefalu (Hill, Sacco); 14:45 - GW - Patrick Grasso (Nazarian) |
| No scoring | | Second period | No scoring |
| (Carle, Biega) Derek Petti - PP - 07:54 | | Third period | 10:34 - PP - Tyler Kelleher (McNicholas, Grasso); 18:53 - EN - Jason Salvaggio (McNicholas, Cleland) |
| ( 25 saves / 29 shots ) Collin Delia | | Goalie stats | Daniel Tirone ( 44 saves / 46 shots ) |

| New Hampshire won series 2–1 |

==== (8) Northeastern vs. (9) Connecticut ====
| March 3 | Northeastern | 3 - 1 | Connecticut | Matthews Arena | Recap |
| (Sikura, J. Stevens) Garret Cockerill - PP - 10:36 | | First period | No scoring |
| (Filipe, Shea) Brendan Collier - GW - 11:58 | | Second period | No scoring |
| (Aston-Reese) Nolan Stevens - EN - 19:17 | | Third period | 18:39 - EA - Benjamin Freeman (Austin, Drake) |
| ( 30 saves / 31 shots ) Ryan Ruck | | Goalie stats | Adam Huska ( 26 saves / 28 shots ) |

| March 4 | Northeastern | 6 - 2 | Connecticut | Matthews Arena | Recap |
| (Griffin, Filipe) Brendan Collier - 04:09 | | First period | No scoring |
| (N. Stevens, J. Stevens) Zach Aston-Reese - 08:06 (J. Stevens, Cockerill) Adam Gaudette - 14:30 | | Second period | 12:20 - Brian Morgan (Kalter, Ronan); 18:01 - Miles Gendron (Austin, Ojantakanen) |
| (Cockerill, Sikura) John Stevens - 11:13 (Aston-Reese, Sikura) John Stevens - 13:10 (N. Stevens, Williams) Jeremy Davies - 14:52 | | Third period | No scoring |
| ( 32 saves / 34 shots ) Ryan Ruck | | Goalie stats | Adam Huska ( 28 saves / 34 shots ) |

| Northeastern won series 2–0 |

=== Quarterfinals ===
==== (1) Massachusetts–Lowell vs. (10) New Hampshire ====
| March 10 | Massachusetts–Lowell | 1 - 3 | New Hampshire | Tsongas Center | Recap |
| No Scoring | | First period | 07:38 - Shane Eiserman (Grasso); 15:11 - GW - Patrick Grasso (Chanter, Nazarian) |
| (Zink, Campbell) Nick Master - 12:25 | | Second period | 13:44 - Marcus Vela (unassisted) |
| No scoring | | Third period | No scoring |
| ( 9 saves / 12 shots ) Tyler Wall | | Goalie stats | Daniel Tirone ( 34 saves / 35 shots ) |

| March 11 | Massachusetts–Lowell | 3 - 1 | New Hampshire | Tsongas Center | Recap |
| (Smith, Gambardella) Tommy Panico - 12:54 | | First period | 08:43 - PP - Matias Cleland (Blackburn) |
| (Dmowski) John Edwardh - GW - 03:07 (Zink, Kapla) Ryan Dmowski - 11:29 | | Second period | No scoring |
| No scoring | | Third period | No scoring |
| ( 18 saves / 19 shots ) Tyler Wall | | Goalie stats | Daniel Tirone ( 21 saves / 24 shots ) |

| March 12 | Massachusetts–Lowell | 8 - 2 | New Hampshire | Tsongas Center | Recap |
| (Zink, Forney) John Edwardh - PP - 03:36 (Hill, Eiserman) Kenny Hausinger - 08:48 (Lohin) Kenny Hausinger - GW - 12:24 (Edwardh, Gambardella) C. J. Smith - 12:53 (Wilson) Colin O'Neill - SH - 15:21 (Edwardh, Gambardella) C. J. Smith - 18:32 | | First period | 05:36 - Marcus Vela (Hill, Eiserman) |
| (Göransson, Hausinger) Colin O'Neill - 13:22 (Master, Göransson) Tyler Mueller - 17:30 | | Second period | No scoring |
| No scoring | | Third period | 07:38 - Tyler Kelleher (unassisted) |
| ( 25 saves / 27 shots ) Tyler Wall / ( 1 saves / 1 shots ) Christoffer Hernberg | | Goalie stats | Daniel Tirone ( 23 saves / 31 shots ) |

| Massachusetts–Lowell won series 2–1 |

==== (2) Boston University vs. (8) Northeastern ====
| March 10 | Boston University | 3 - 2 | OT | Northeastern | Agganis Arena | Recap |
| No Scoring | | First period | | 07:23 - Zach Aston-Reese (N. Stevens, Davies); 09:52 - Dylan Sikura (Davies, Williams) |
| (Hickey, Bellows) Dante Fabbro - PP - 07:33 | | Second period | | No scoring |
| (Curry) Chase Phelps - 09:28 | | Third period | | No scoring |
| (Keller, McAvoy) Jordan Greenway - GW PP - 03:11 | | First overtime period | | No scoring |
| ( 33 saves / 35 shots ) Jake Oettinger | | Goalie stats | | Ryan Ruck ( 32 saves / 35 shots ) |

| March 11 | Boston University | 3 - 2 | Northeastern | Agganis Arena | Recap |
| No Scoring | | First period | 02:23 - Biagio Lerario (Pond, Jamieson); 11:21 - Nolan Stevens (Filipe, Shea) |
| (Keller, McAvoy) Jakob Forsbacka Karlsson - PP - 14:38 | | Second period | No scoring |
| (Forsbacka Karlsson, McAvoy) Nick Roberto - 03:01 (Forsbacka Karlsson, McAvoy) Chad Krys - GW PP - 19:35 | | Third period | No scoring |
| ( 24 saves / 26 shots ) Jake Oettinger | | Goalie stats | Ryan Ruck ( 25 saves / 28 shots ) |

| Boston University won series 2–0 |

==== (3) Boston College vs. (6) Vermont ====
| March 10 | Boston College | 7 - 0 | Vermont | Conte Forum | Recap |
| (White, Fitzgerald) Austin Cangelosi - GW - 00:08 (McInnis) Colin White - 05:15 (Fitzgerald, McPhee) Luke McInnis - 14:23 | | First period | No scoring |
| (Kim, McInnis) Matthew Gaudreau - 05:27 | | Second period | No scoring |
| (Gaudreau, McInnis) Christopher Brown - PP - 13:02 (Fitzgerald, Moore) Julius Mattila - SH - 18:30 (unassisted) Christopher Brown - SH - 19:59 | | Third period | No scoring |
| ( 22 saves / 22 shots ) Joseph Woll | | Goalie stats | Stefanos Lekkas ( 20 saves / 24 shots ) / Mike Santaguida ( 4 saves / 7 shots ) |

| March 11 | Boston College | 7 - 4 | Vermont | Conte Forum | Recap |
| (White, Savage) JD Dudek - PP - 03:35 (Kim, Calnan) Connor Moore - 07:10 (Cangelosi, Savage) JD Dudek - PP - 08:57 | | First period | 13:14 - PP - Ross Colton (Hamilton, Puskarich); 19:41 - PP - Rob Hamilton (Puskarich, Bradley) |
| (Cotton, White) Austin Cangelosi - PP - 07:24 (White, Savage) Austin Cangelosi - GW PP - 11:22 | | Second period | 17:14 - Rob Hamilton (Petruzzelli, Coughlin) |
| (Ju. Mattila) Chris Calnan - 13:25 (Gaudreau, Kim) Ryan Fitzgerald - 17:39 | | Third period | 18:02 - Matt O'Donnell (Shaw, Puffer) |
| ( 32 saves / 36 shots ) Joseph Woll | | Goalie stats | Stefanos Lekkas ( 27 saves / 34 shots ) |

| Boston College won series 2–0 |

==== (4) Notre Dame vs. (5) Providence ====
| March 10 | Notre Dame | 5 - 0 | Providence | Compton Family Ice Arena | Recap |
| (Brauer, Jenkins) Jordan Gross - GW - 09:31 | | First period | No scoring |
| (Brauer, Dello) Jack Jenkins - 04:24 (Gross, Petersen) Joe Wegwerth - 11:35 (Morrison, Nardella) Jake Evans - 17:05 | | Second period | No scoring |
| (Bjork, Evans) Andrew Oglevie - PP - 02:11 | | Third period | No scoring |
| ( 43 saves / 43 shots ) Cal Petersen | | Goalie stats | Hayden Hawkey ( 20 saves / 25 shots ) |

| March 11 | Notre Dame | 5 - 2 | Providence | Compton Family Ice Arena | Recap |
| No Scoring | | First period | No scoring |
| (Evans, Bjork) Cam Morrison - PP - 12:58 | | Second period | 10:48 - Brian Pinho (Walman) |
| (Bjork) Jordan Gross - 00:21 (Oglevie, Morrison) Bobby Nardella - GW - 07:29 (Jenkins, Oglevie) Dylan Malmquist - EN - 18:55 (Oglevie, Gilbert) Dylan Malmquist - EN - 19:37 | | Third period | 11:18 - PP - Brian Pinho (Young, Walman) |
| ( 28 saves / 30 shots ) Cal Petersen | | Goalie stats | Hayden Hawkey ( 33 saves / 36 shots ) |

| Notre Dame won series 2–0 |

=== Semifinals ===
==== (1) Massachusetts–Lowell vs. (4) Notre Dame ====
| March 17 | Massachusetts–Lowell | 5 - 1 | Notre Dame | TD Garden | Recap |
| (Hausinger, Lohin) Colin O'Neill - 07:25 (Göransson, Mueller) Ryan Lohin - GW - 09:31 | | First period | 07:00 - Jack Jenkins (Gilbert, Peeke) |
| (Gambardella) C. J. Smith - 06:34 (Hausinger, Lohin) Michael Kapla - 18:52 | | Second period | No scoring |
| (Collins) Nick Marin - 02:58 | | Third period | No scoring |
| ( 19 saves / 20 shots ) Tyler Wall | | Goalie stats | Cal Petersen ( 36 saves / 41 shots ) |

==== (2) Boston University vs. (3) Boston College ====
| March 18 | Boston University | 2 - 3 | Boston College | TD Garden | Recap |
| No Scoring | | First period | No scoring |
| No scoring | | Second period | 01:58 - Julius Mattila (Savage, Je. Mattila); 13:21 - SH - Ryan Fitzgerald (Brown, Savage) |
| (Keller, Carpenter) Jordan Greenway - EA - 17:36 (Forsbacka Karlsson, Greenway) Clayton Keller - EA - 18:38 | | Third period | 00:58 - GW - Ryan Fitzgerald (Brown, Gaudreau) |
| ( 32 saves / 35 shots ) Jake Oettinger | | Goalie stats | Joseph Woll ( 42 saves / 44 shots ) |

=== Championship ===
==== (1) Massachusetts–Lowell vs. (3) Boston College ====
| March 18 | Massachusetts–Lowell | 4 - 3 | Boston College | TD Garden | Recap |
| (unassisted) C. J. Smith - 01:06 (Smith, Panico) Chris Forney - 12:06 | | First period | 05:31 - PP - Austin Cangelosi (Dudek, Savage); 18:38 - SH - Graham McPhee (unassisted) |
| (Gambardella, Smith) John Edwardh - PP - 10:05 (Kapla, Edwardh) Joe Gambardella - GW - 11:37 | | Second period | No scoring |
| No scoring | | Third period | 17:15 - EA - Ryan Fitzgerald (Dudek, Savage) |
| ( 38 saves / 41 shots ) Tyler Wall | | Goalie stats | Joseph Woll ( 21 saves / 25 shots ) |

== Tournament awards ==
=== All-Tournament Team ===
- F Joe Gambardella Massachusetts–Lowell
- F C. J. Smith* Massachusetts–Lowell
- F Ryan Fitzgerald Boston College
- D Michael Kapla Massachusetts–Lowell
- D Scott Savage Boston College
- G Tyler Wall Massachusetts–Lowell

* Tournament MVP(s)
