= 2016–17 Yale Bulldogs men's ice hockey season =

College ice hockey season

- Conference: 8th ECAC Hockey
- Home ice: Ingalls Rink

Rankings
- USCHO.com: NR
- USA Today: NR

Record
- Overall: 13–15–5
- Conference: 7–11–4
- Home: 8–7–1
- Road: 4–8–3
- Neutral: 1–0–1

Coaches and captains
- Head coach: Keith Allain
- Assistant coaches: Josh Siembida; Ryan Donald; Stephen Volek; Nick Costanzo
- Captain: John Hayden

The 2016–17 Yale Bulldogs men's ice hockey season was the 122nd season of play for the program and the 56th season in the ECAC Hockey conference. The Bulldogs represented Yale University and were coached by Keith Allain, in his 11th season.

== Season ==
Despite losing two of its best defensive players to graduation, Yale entered the season ranked. After a bad week in mid-November, however, the team found itself outside of the top-20 and it quickly sank to the bottom of the conference. After finishing 3rd in the Shillelagh Tournament, Yale clawed its way back up to a .500 record and then promptly lost back-to-back matches to ranked teams.

After the disappointing start, Yale began the new year more focused and put together a strong stretch in the month of January. The Bulldogs went 6–1–2 with ties against #16 St. Lawrence and #6 Harvard, putting them in contention for the NCAA Tournament. In February, however, their fortunes reversed and the team won just one of its last eight games, finishing 8th in ECAC Hockey.

When the conference tournament began, Yale's only chance of reaching the national tournament was a conference championship. The team took care of business in the first round with a pair of wins over Dartmouth, which set up a showdown with arch-rival Harvard. By then the Crimson had risen to #2 in the country but they got a tougher challenge than they were expecting from the Bulldogs. Yale scored six goals in two games, but their defense wasn't able to hold back Harvard's attack. The Bulldogs dropped both games and abruptly ended a once-promising season.

== Departures ==
Player	Position	Nationality	Cause
Matthew Beattie	Forward/Defenseman	United States	Graduation (signed with Étoile Noire de Strasbourg)
Tim Bonner	Forward	United States	Left program (retired)
Carson Cooper	Forward	Canada	Graduation (signed with Étoile Noire de Strasbourg)
Cody Learned	Forward	United States	Graduation (retired)
Alex Lyon	Goaltender	United States	Graduation (signed with Philadelphia Flyers)
Rob O'Gara	Defenseman	United States	Graduation (signed with Boston Bruins)
Ryan Obuchowski	Defenseman	United States	Graduation (signed with Missouri Mavericks)
Charles Orzetti	Forward	United States	Graduation (retired)
Stu Wilson	Forward	United States	Graduation (signed with Rochester Americans)
Mitch Witek	Defenseman	United States	Graduation (signed with Étoile Noire de Strasbourg)

== Recruiting ==
Player	Position	Nationality	Age	Notes
Will D'Orsi	Forward	United States	19	Sudbury, MA
Robbie DeMontis	Forward	Canada	20	Vaughan, ON
Matt Foley	Defenseman	United States	21	Longmeadow, MA
Corbin Kaczperski	Goaltender	United States	20	China Township, MI
Chandler Lindstrand	Defenseman	United States	20	Medina, MN
Evan Smith	Forward	Canada	20	Markham, ON
Mitchell Smith	Forward	Canada	20	Markham, ON
Luke Stevens	Forward	United States	19	Duxbury, MA; selected 126th overall in 2015
Billy Sweezey	Forward	United States	20	Hanson, MA

== Roster ==
As of August 1, 2016.

No.	Nat.	Player	Class	Pos	Height	Weight	DoB	Hometown	Previous team	NHL rights
1	(United States)	Sam Tucker	Sophomore	G	6' 2" (1.88 m)	180 lb (82 kg)	1996-04-16	Wilton, Connecticut	Choate Rosemary Hall (USHS–CT)	—
2	(United States)	Adam Larkin	Junior	D	6' 0" (1.83 m)	190 lb (86 kg)	1995-01-28	Clarkston, Michigan	Muskegon Lumberjacks (USHL)	—
3	(United States)	Dan O'Keefe	Senior	D	6' 3" (1.91 m)	205 lb (93 kg)	1994-03-06	North Wall, New Jersey	Surrey Eagles (BCHL)	—
4	(United States)	Matt Foley	Freshman	D	6' 1" (1.85 m)	195 lb (88 kg)	1995-04-20	Longmeadow, Massachusetts	Bloomington Thunder (USHL)	—
6	(United States)	Billy Sweezey	Freshman	D	6' 2" (1.88 m)	204 lb (93 kg)	1996-02-06	Hanson, Massachusetts	Chicago Steel (USHL)	—
7	(United States)	Joe Snively	Sophomore	F	5' 9" (1.75 m)	165 lb (75 kg)	1996-01-01	Herndon, Virginia	Sioux City Musketeers (USHL)	—
8	(United States)	Will D'Orsi	Freshman	F	5' 11" (1.8 m)	180 lb (82 kg)	1997-01-07	Sudbury, Massachusetts	Lincoln Stars (USHL)	—
9	(Canada)	Robbie DeMontis	Freshman	F	5' 9" (1.75 m)	165 lb (75 kg)	1996-02-17	Kleinburg, Ontario	Muskegon Lumberjacks (USHL)	—
10	(United States)	Chandler Lindstrand	Freshman	D	6' 0" (1.83 m)	195 lb (88 kg)	1996-02-21	Medina, Minnesota	Des Moines Buccaneers (USHL)	—
11	(United States)	Andrew Gaus	Sophomore	F	6' 0" (1.83 m)	185 lb (84 kg)	1995-02-23	Wexford, Pennsylvania	Cedar Rapids RoughRiders (USHL)	—
13	(Canada)	Evan Smith	Freshman	F	6' 0" (1.83 m)	190 lb (86 kg)	1996-08-28	Stouffville, Ontario	Dubuque Fighting Saints (USHL)	—
14	(Canada)	Mitchell Smith	Freshman	F	5' 11" (1.8 m)	185 lb (84 kg)	1996-08-28	Stouffville, Ontario	Dubuque Fighting Saints (USHL)	—
15	(United States)	Henry Hart	Junior	F	5' 7" (1.7 m)	170 lb (77 kg)	1994-09-27	Stillwater, Minnesota	Phillips Exeter Academy (USHS–NH)	—
16	(United States)	Anthony Walsh	Sophomore	D	5' 9" (1.75 m)	180 lb (82 kg)	1995-09-21	Burr Ridge, Illinois	Green Bay Gamblers (USHL)	—
17	(United States)	Frankie DiChiara	Senior	F	6' 2" (1.88 m)	225 lb (102 kg)	1993-09-22	Ronkonkoma, New York	Dubuque Fighting Saints (USHL)	—
18	(United States)	Nate Repensky	Junior	D	5' 11" (1.8 m)	185 lb (84 kg)	1993-11-22	Duluth, Minnesota	Bismarck Bobcats (NAHL)	—
19	(United States)	Ted Hart	Sophomore	F	6' 1" (1.85 m)	185 lb (84 kg)	1996-02-20	Cumberland, Maine	Phillips Exeter Academy (USHS–NH)	—
20	(United States)	John Baiocco	Junior	F	5' 8" (1.73 m)	175 lb (79 kg)	1995-06-06	New Vernon, New Jersey	Dubuque Fighting Saints (USHL)	—
21	(United States)	John Hayden (C)	Senior	F	6' 3" (1.91 m)	217 lb (98 kg)	1995-02-14	Greenwich, Connecticut	USNTDP (USHL)	CHI, 74th overall 2013
22	(United States)	J. M. Piotrowski	Sophomore	F	6' 2" (1.88 m)	190 lb (86 kg)	1995-05-01	Irving, Texas	Sioux City Musketeers (USHL)	—
23	(United States)	Charlie Curti	Sophomore	D	6' 0" (1.83 m)	192 lb (87 kg)	1995-05-24	Mound, Minnesota	Cedar Rapids RoughRiders (USHL)	—
24	(United States)	Mike Doherty	Senior	F	5' 11" (1.8 m)	183 lb (83 kg)	1993-08-21	Reading, Massachusetts	Islanders Hockey Club (EJHL)	—
25	(United States)	Chris Izmirlian	Senior	F	5' 10" (1.78 m)	180 lb (82 kg)	1992-12-28	Highland Beach, Florida	Islanders Hockey Club (EJHL)	—
27	(United States)	Luke Stevens	Freshman	F	6' 5" (1.96 m)	205 lb (93 kg)	1997-02-11	Duxbury, Massachusetts	Noble & Greenough School (USHS–MA)	CAR, 126th overall 2015
28	(United States)	Ryan Hitchcock	Junior	F	5' 10" (1.78 m)	176 lb (80 kg)	1996-03-30	Manhasset, New York	USNTDP (USHL)	—
30	(Canada)	Patrick Spano	Senior	G	6' 1" (1.85 m)	195 lb (88 kg)	1993-03-01	Montreal, Quebec	Cowichan Valley Capitals (BCHL)	—
33	(United States)	Corbin Kaczperski	Freshman	G	6' 3" (1.91 m)	185 lb (84 kg)	1996-03-02	China Township, Michigan	Lone Star Brahmas (NAHL)	—

== Standings ==
2016–17 ECAC Hockey men's standings
	Conference record							Overall record					
	GP	W	L	T	PTS	GF	GA	GP	W	L	T	GF	GA
#3 Harvard†*	22	16	4	2	34	85	47	36	28	6	2	146	77
#11 Union†	22	16	4	2	34	87	56	38	25	10	3	143	113
#13 Cornell	22	13	4	5	31	70	51	35	21	9	5	99	81
St. Lawrence	22	12	6	4	28	61	44	37	17	13	7	104	88
#20 Quinnipiac	22	13	8	1	27	69	55	40	23	15	2	121	101
Clarkson	22	10	9	3	23	67	62	39	18	16	5	124	112
Princeton	22	8	11	3	19	63	75	34	15	16	3	103	111
Yale	22	7	11	4	18	62	67	33	13	15	5	99	98
Dartmouth	22	7	13	2	16	59	80	31	10	18	3	83	111
Colgate	22	6	13	3	15	40	62	37	9	22	6	78	113
Rensselaer	22	6	16	0	12	52	76	37	8	28	1	83	138
Brown	22	3	18	1	7	47	87	31	4	25	2	66	132
Championship: March 18, 2017 † indicates conference regular season champion (Cleary Cup) * indicates conference tournament champion (Whitelaw Cup); Rankings: USCHO.com Top 20 Poll; updated March 6, 2017

== Schedule and results ==
Date	Time	Opponent^{#}	Rank^{#}	Site	TV	Decision	Result	Attendance	Record
Regular season
October 29	7:00 PM	vs. Sacred Heart*	#17	Ingalls Rink • New Haven, Connecticut		Spano	W 4–1	2,619	1–0–0
November 4	7:00 PM	at #20 Union	#16	Achilles Rink • Schenectady, New York		Spano	L 3–5	1,836	1–1–0 (0–1–0)
November 5	7:00 PM	at Rensselaer	#16	Houston Field House • Troy, New York		Spano	W 3–2 ^{OT}	2,500	2–1–0 (1–1–0)
November 11	7:00 PM	vs. Colgate	#19	Ingalls Rink • New Haven, Connecticut		Spano	L 1–4 ^{OT}	3,210	2–2–0 (1–2–0)
November 12	7:00 PM	vs. Cornell	#19	Ingalls Rink • New Haven, Connecticut		Spano	L 3–6	3,500	2–3–0 (1–3–0)
November 18	7:00 PM	at #20 St. Lawrence		Appleton Arena • Canton, New York		Tucker	L 2–5	1,171	2–4–0 (1–4–0)
November 19	7:00 PM	at Clarkson		Cheel Arena • Potsdam, New York		Spano	T 3–3 ^{OT}	3,002	2–4–1 (1–4–1)
Shillelagh Tournament
November 25	4:05 PM	vs. Clarkson*		Compton Family Ice Arena • Notre Dame, Indiana (Shillelagh Tournament semifinal)		Spano	T 2–2 ^{SOL}	4,581	2–4–2
November 26	4:05 PM	vs. Holy Cross*		Compton Family Ice Arena • Notre Dame, Indiana (Shillelagh Tournament consolation game)		Spano	W 3–1	3,865	3–4–2
December 9	7:00 PM	vs. Rensselaer		Ingalls Rink • New Haven, Connecticut		Spano	W 7–3	3,113	4–4–2 (2–4–1)
December 10	7:00 PM	vs. #15 Union		Ingalls Rink • New Haven, Connecticut		Tucker	L 3–5	3,500	4–5–2 (2–5–1)
December 13	7:05 PM	at #6 Boston University*		Agganis Arena • Boston, Massachusetts		Tucker	L 2–5	3,892	4–6–2
December 28	7:00 PM	vs. Ottawa*		Ingalls Rink • New Haven, Connecticut (Exhibition)		Spano	W 7–1	3,061	
January 3	7:00 PM	vs. Northeastern*		Ingalls Rink • New Haven, Connecticut		Spano	W 5–4	2,708	5–6–2
January 7	3:05 PM	at Connecticut*		XL Center • Hartford, Connecticut		Tucker	W 4–2	4,909	6–6–2
January 10	3:05 PM	vs. Providence*		Ingalls Rink • New Haven, Connecticut		Spano	L 1–3	3,061	6–7–2
January 13	7:00 PM	vs. Clarkson		Ingalls Rink • New Haven, Connecticut		Spano	W 2–1	2,955	7–7–2 (3–5–1)
January 14	7:00 PM	vs. #16 St. Lawrence		Ingalls Rink • New Haven, Connecticut		Spano	T 2–2 ^{OT}	3,500	7–7–3 (3–5–2)
January 20	7:00 PM	at Dartmouth		Thompson Arena • Hanover, New Hampshire		Spano	W 7–0	2,477	8–7–3 (4–5–2)
January 21	7:00 PM	at #6 Harvard		Bright-Landry Hockey Center • Boston, Massachusetts		Spano	T 1–1 ^{OT}	3,095	8–7–4 (4–5–3)
January 27	7:05 PM	at Brown		Meehan Auditorium • Providence, Rhode Island		Spano	W 4–3	1,406	9–7–4 (5–5–3)
January 28	7:00 PM	vs. Brown		Ingalls Rink • New Haven, Connecticut		Tucker	W 4–1	3,500	10–7–4 (6–5–3)
February 3	7:00 PM	vs. Princeton		Ingalls Rink • New Haven, Connecticut		Tucker	L 2–4	3,500	10–8–4 (6–6–3)
February 4	7:00 PM	vs. #19 Quinnipiac		Ingalls Rink • New Haven, Connecticut		Spano	L 2–5	3,500	10–9–4 (6–7–3)
February 11	7:03 PM	at #12 Cornell		Lynah Rink • Ithaca, New York		Tucker	T 2–2 ^{OT}	4,267	10–9–5 (6–7–4)
February 12	3:05 PM	at Colgate		Class of 1965 Arena • Hamilton, New York		Tucker	L 2–4	1,164	10–10–5 (6–8–4)
February 17	7:00 PM	vs. #3 Harvard		Ingalls Rink • New Haven, Connecticut		Spano	L 2–4	3,500	10–11–5 (6–9–4)
February 18	7:00 PM	vs. Dartmouth		Ingalls Rink • New Haven, Connecticut		Tucker	W 4–0	3,500	11–11–5 (7–9–4)
February 24	7:04 PM	at Quinnipiac		TD Bank Sports Center • Hamden, Connecticut	YES	Tucker	L 2–3	3,695	11–12–5 (7–10–4)
February 25	7:00 PM	at Princeton		Hobey Baker Memorial Rink • Princeton, New Jersey		Spano	L 1–4	2,200	11–13–5 (7–11–4)
ECAC Hockey Tournament
March 3	7:00 PM	vs. Dartmouth*		Ingalls Rink • New Haven, Connecticut (First Round Game 1)		Tucker	W 6–1	1,755	12–13–5
March 4	7:00 PM	vs. Dartmouth*		Ingalls Rink • New Haven, Connecticut (First Round Game 2)		Tucker	W 3–2 ^{OT}	2,025	13–13–5
Yale Won Series 2–0
March 10	7:00 PM	at #2 Harvard*		Bright-Landry Hockey Center • Boston, Massachusetts (Quarterfinal Game 1)		Tucker	L 4–6	1,821	13–14–5
March 11	7:00 PM	at #2 Harvard*		Bright-Landry Hockey Center • Boston, Massachusetts (Quarterfinal Game 2)		Tucker	L 3–4	2,028	13–15–5
Yale Lost Series 0–2
*Non-conference game. ^{#}Rankings from USCHO.com Poll. All times are in Eastern Time.

== Scoring statistics ==
Name	Position	Games	Goals	Assists	Points	PIM
Joe Snivley	LW	33	14	25	39	34
John Hayden	C/RW	33	21	13	34	62
Frankie DiChiara	LW	30	10	11	21	28
Ryan Hitchcock	C/LW	17	3	16	19	8
Ted Heart	C/RW	33	11	5	16	12
Mike Doherty	LW/RW	33	7	9	16	20
Adam Larkin	D	32	3	11	14	18
Charlie Curti	D	32	2	12	14	14
Chris Izmirlian	F	31	5	8	13	22
Andrew Gaus	RW	32	6	6	12	8
Evan Smith	C/LW	33	4	6	10	30
Henry Hart	F	27	1	9	10	12
Robbie DeMontis	LW	33	1	9	10	6
Anthony Walsh	D/F	18	2	6	8	18
Matt Foley	D	33	1	7	8	18
Chandler Lindstrand	D	21	1	5	6	7
Billy Sweezey	D	33	1	5	6	40
Luke Stevens	LW	17	2	3	5	4
Mitchell Smith	LW	30	3	1	4	12
John Baiocco	F	7	1	1	2	0
Will D'Orsi	C	13	0	2	2	6
J. M. Piotrowski	F	15	0	1	1	7
Dan O'Keefe	D	8	0	0	0	2
Sam Tucker	G	15	0	0	0	0
Patrick Spano	G	20	0	0	0	0
Bench	-	33	-	-	-	4
Total			99	171	270	392

== Goaltending statistics ==
Name	Games	Minutes	Wins	Losses	Ties	Goals against	Saves	Shut outs	SV %	GAA
Patrick Spano	20	1155	8	7	4	52	485	1	.903	2.70
Sam Tucker	15	847	5	8	1	43	382	1	.899	3.05
Empty Net	-	16	-	-	-	3	-	-	-	-
Total	33	2019	13	15	5	98	867	2	.898	2.91

== Rankings ==
Poll	Week																									
Poll	Pre	1	2	3	4	5	6	7	8	9	10	11	12	13	14	15	16	17	18	19	20	21	22	23	24	25 (Final)
USCHO.com	18	17	16	17	16	19	NR	NR	NR	NR	NR	NR	NR	NR	NR	NR	NR	NR	NR	NR	NR	NR	NR	NR	–	NR
USA Today	NR	NR	NR	NR	NR	NR	NR	NR	NR	NR	NR	NR	NR	NR	NR	NR	NR	NR	NR	NR	NR	NR	NR	NR	NR	NR

*USCHO did not release a poll in week 24.

== Awards and honors ==
Player	Award	Ref
John Hayden	ECAC Hockey Second Team	

== Players drafted into the NHL ==
=== 2017 NHL entry draft ===
Round	Pick	Player	NHL team
7	208	Phil Kemp^{†}	Edmonton Oilers

† incoming freshman
