= 2016–17 Alabama–Huntsville Chargers men's ice hockey season =

American college ice hockey team season

2016–17 Alabama–Huntsville Chargers men's ice hockey
- Conference: Western Collegiate Hockey Association
- Record: 9–22–3 (9–16–4 WCHA)
- Head coach: Mike Corbett (4th season)
- Assistant coaches: Gavin Morgan; Matty Thomas
- Captain: Brent Fletcher
- Alternate captain: Max McHugh, Matt Salhany
- Home stadium: Propst Arena at the Von Braun Center

The 2016–17 Alabama–Huntsville Chargers ice hockey team represented the University of Alabama in Huntsville in the 2016–17 NCAA Division I men's ice hockey season. The Chargers were coached by Mike Corbett who was in his fourth season as head coach. His assistant coaches were Gavin Morgan and Matty Thomas. The Chargers played their home games in the Propst Arena at the Von Braun Center and competed in the Western Collegiate Hockey Association.

== Recruiting ==
UAH added 4 freshmen for the 2016–17 season, including 2 forwards and 2 defensemen.

Player	Position	Nationality	Notes
Austin Beaulieu	Forward	United States	Coral Springs, Florida; 2014–15 NAHL All-Rookie Team while playing with the Wichita Falls Wildcats
Connor James	Defenseman	Canada	Wainwright, Alberta; 2013–14 and 2014–15 AJHL champion with the Spruce Grove Saints
Jordan Larson	Forward	Canada	Fort Frances, Ontario; Former Carleton Place Canadians captain, 2013–14 and 2014–15 CCHL champion, 2011–12 SIJHL Rookie of the Year
Sean Rappleyea	Forward	United States	South Amboy, New Jersey; Former Ottawa Jr. Senators alternate captain, 2015–16 CCHL Defenseman of the Year and First-Team All-Star

== Roster ==
=== Departures from 2015–16 team ===
- James Block, F
- Chad Brears, F, Graduated, signed with the Pensacola Ice Flyers (SPHL)
- Frank Misuraca, D, Graduated, signed with the Peoria Rivermen (SPHL)
- Jack Prince, F, Graduated, signed with the Manchester Storm (EIHL)
- Anderson White, D, Graduated

Additionally, Brandon Carlson's NCAA eligibility expired November 19, due to classes he had taken before enrolling at UAH.

=== 2016–17 team ===
No.	Nat.	Player	Class	Pos	Height	Weight	DoB	Hometown	Previous team
2		Cam Knight	Sophomore	D	6' 1" (1.85 m)	190 lb (86 kg)	1995-01-10	North Reading, Massachusetts	Wichita Falls (NAHL)
4		Connor James	Freshman	D	5' 9" (1.75 m)	170 lb (77 kg)	1996-10-11	Wainwright	Spruce Grove (AJHL)
5		Cody Champagne	Junior	D	5' 11" (1.8 m)	185 lb (84 kg)	1994-08-09	Brookfield, Connecticut	Topeka (NAHL)
6		Sean Rappleyea	Freshman	D	5' 11" (1.8 m)	175 lb (79 kg)	1995-02-03	Sayreville, New Jersey	Ottawa (CCHL)
7		Max McHugh (A)	Junior	F	5' 10" (1.78 m)	180 lb (82 kg)	1993-08-20	Seattle, Washington	Dubuque (USHL)
8		John Teets	Sophomore	D	6' 3" (1.91 m)	195 lb (88 kg)	1994-08-10	Fairbanks, Alaska	Fairbanks (NAHL)
9		Hunter Anderson	Sophomore	F	6' 4" (1.93 m)	210 lb (95 kg)	1994-03-01	Savage, Minnesota	Langley (BCHL)
10		Brent Fletcher (C)	Senior	F	6' 2" (1.88 m)	200 lb (91 kg)	1992-05-09	New Westminster, British Columbia	Merritt (BCHL)
11		Jordan Larson	Freshman	F	5' 10" (1.78 m)	190 lb (86 kg)	1995-05-13	Fort Frances, Ontario	Carleton Place (CCHL)
12		Regan Soquila	Senior	F	5' 10" (1.78 m)	180 lb (82 kg)	1993-06-03	Maple Ridge, British Columbia	Merritt (BCHL)
14		Madison Dunn	Sophomore	F	5' 8" (1.73 m)	165 lb (75 kg)	1995-10-04	Calgary, Alberta	Brooks (AJHL)
15		Hans Gorowsky	Sophomore	F	5' 10" (1.78 m)	180 lb (82 kg)	1994-12-20	Lino Lakes, Minnesota	Fairbanks (NAHL)
16		Jetlan Houcher	Sophomore	F	6' 0" (1.83 m)	190 lb (86 kg)	1994-02-15	Paradise Valley, Alberta	Fort McMurray (AJHL)
18		Austin Beaulieu	Freshman	F	5' 9" (1.75 m)	170 lb (77 kg)	1996-10-21	Coral Springs, Florida	Wichita Falls (CCHL)
19		Brandon Salerno	Freshman	F	5' 8" (1.73 m)	170 lb (77 kg)	1995-07-31	Toronto, Ontario	Pickering (OJHL)
20		Brandon Parker	Junior	D	5' 10" (1.78 m)	175 lb (79 kg)	1993-02-17	Faribault, Minnesota	Brookings (NAHL)
21		Tyler Poulsen	Sophomore	F	5' 7" (1.7 m)	160 lb (73 kg)	1993-04-01	Arvada, Colorado	Topeka (NAHL)
22		Matt Salhany (A)	Senior	F	5' 10" (1.78 m)	175 lb (79 kg)	1993-01-08	Warwick, Rhode Island	Boston (EJHL)
23		Cody Marooney	Senior	F	6' 0" (1.83 m)	190 lb (86 kg)	1992-07-07	Chaska, Minnesota	Brookings (NAHL)
24		Brennan Saulnier	Junior	F	6' 0" (1.83 m)	170 lb (77 kg)	1993-12-29	Halifax, Nova Scotia	Fort McMurray (AJHL)
25		Adam Wilcox	Sophomore	F	6' 1" (1.85 m)	200 lb (91 kg)	1994-04-25	Alpharetta, Georgia	Fairbanks (NAHL)
26		Josh Kestner	Junior	F	6' 0" (1.83 m)	170 lb (77 kg)	1993-11-08	Huntsville, Alabama	Sarnia (GOJHL)
28		Kurt Gosselin	Sophomore	D	6' 0" (1.83 m)	190 lb (86 kg)	1994-11-30	Brighton, Michigan	Alberni Valley (BCHL)
30		Matt Larose	Senior	G	6' 5" (1.96 m)	210 lb (95 kg)	1992-08-15	Nanaimo, British Columbia	Wellington (OJHL)
32		Jordan Uhelski	Junior	G	6' 1" (1.85 m)	185 lb (84 kg)	1993-08-04	Flint, Michigan	Muskegon (USHL)
33		Richard Buri	Junior	D	6' 5" (1.96 m)	215 lb (98 kg)	1994-01-12	Nitra, Slovakia	Minnesota (NAHL)
35		Carmine Guerriero	Senior	G	6' 0" (1.83 m)	175 lb (79 kg)	1992-02-20	Montreal, Quebec	Hawkesbury (CCHL)
41		Brandon Carlson	Senior	F	6' 2" (1.88 m)	205 lb (93 kg)	1992-06-15	Huntington Beach, California	Dubuque (USHL)

== Schedule and results ==
- Green background indicates win.
- Red background indicates loss.
- Yellow background indicates tie.

Date	Time	Opponent	Site	Decision	Result	Attendance	Record
Regular Season
October 1	4:07 pm	at #20 Ferris State	Ewigleben Arena • Big Rapids, Michigan	Larose	W 2–1	1,510	1–0–0 (1–0–0)
October 2	2:07 pm	at #20 Ferris State	Ewigleben Arena • Big Rapids, Michigan	Larose	W 4–3	1,433	2–0–0 (2–0–0)
October 7	6:05 pm	at Connecticut*	XL Center • Hartford, Connecticut	Larose	L 0–6	3,122	2–1–0 (2–0–0)
October 8	3:05 pm	at Connecticut*	XL Center • Hartford, Connecticut	Larose	L 0–4	3,193	2–2–0 (2–0–0)
October 14	6:07 pm	at Michigan Tech	MacInnes Student Ice Arena • Houghton, Michigan	Larose	L 3–7	2,942	2–3–0 (2–1–0)
October 15	6:07 pm	at Michigan Tech	MacInnes Student Ice Arena • Houghton, Michigan	Uhelski	T 1–1 ^{SOL}	3,013	2–3–1 (2–1–1)
October 21	7:07 pm	Lake Superior State	Propst Arena • Huntsville, Alabama	Larose	L 3–6	2,106	2–4–1 (2–2–1)
October 22	7:07 pm	Lake Superior State	Propst Arena • Huntsville, Alabama	Uhelski	L 2–5	2,163	2–5–1 (2–3–1)
October 28	7:37 pm	at #10 St. Cloud State*	Herb Brooks National Hockey Center • St. Cloud, Minnesota	Uhelski	L 1–5	3,541	2–6–1 (2–3–1)
October 29	7:07 pm	at #10 St. Cloud State*	Herb Brooks National Hockey Center • St. Cloud, Minnesota	Uhelski	L 2–5	3,838	2–7–1 (2–3–1)
November 4	10:07 pm	at Alaska–Anchorage	Sullivan Arena • Anchorage, Alaska	Uhelski	W 5–2	2,128	3–7–1 (3–3–1)
November 5	10:07 pm	at Alaska–Anchorage	Sullivan Arena • Anchorage, Alaska	Uhelski	W 3–2 ^{OT}	1,771	4–7–1 (4–3–1)
November 11	7:07 pm	Alaska	Propst Arena • Huntsville, Alabama	Uhelski	T 3–3 ^{SOL}	1,921	4–7–2 (4–3–2)
November 12	7:07 pm	Alaska	Propst Arena • Huntsville, Alabama	Guerrero	L 1–3	2,103	4–8–2 (4–4–2)
November 18	7:07 pm	Bowling Green	Propst Arena • Huntsville, Alabama	Guerrero	L 1–4	1,374	4–9–2 (4–5–2)
November 19	7:07 pm	Bowling Green	Propst Arena • Huntsville, Alabama	Guerrero	L 3–8	1,218	4–10–2 (4–6–2)
December 3	7:07 pm	Ferris State	Propst Arena • Huntsville, Alabama	Uhelski	W 5–3	1,197	5–10–2 (5–6–2)
December 4	3:07 pm	Ferris State	Propst Arena • Huntsville, Alabama	Uhelski	L 1–3	972	5–11–2 (5–7–2)
December 9	6:07 pm	at Northern Michigan	Berry Events Center • Marquette, Michigan	Uhelski	W 4–1	1,261	6–11–2 (6–7–2)
December 10	6:07 pm	at Northern Michigan	Berry Events Center • Marquette, Michigan	Uhelski	W 3–1	1,154	7–11–2 (7–7–2)
December 30	4:00 pm	vs. UMass*	Mariucci Arena • Minneapolis, Minnesota (Mariucci Classic)	Uhelski	L 1–2 ^{OT}	9,910	7–12–2 (7–7–2)
December 31	4:00 pm	vs. Mercyhurst*	Mariucci Arena • Minneapolis, Minnesota (Mariucci Classic)	Guerrero	L 2–3 ^{OT}	7,989	7–13–2 (7–7–2)
January 6	7:07 pm	#19 Minnesota State	Propst Arena • Huntsville, Alabama	Uhelski	L 0–3	1,104	7–14–2 (7–8–2)
January 7	7:07 pm	#19 Minnesota State	Propst Arena • Huntsville, Alabama	Guerrero	L 2–3	1,329	7–15–2 (7–9–2)
January 20	6:37 pm	at Lake Superior State	Taffy Abel Arena • Sault Ste. Marie, Michigan	Guerrero	L 4–5	1,754	7–16–2 (7–10–2)
January 21	6:07 pm	at Lake Superior State	Taffy Abel Arena • Sault Ste. Marie, Michigan	Guerrero	L 1–4	1,941	7–17–2 (7–11–2)
January 27	7:07 pm	Michigan Tech	Propst Arena • Huntsville, Alabama	Larose	L 2–5	2,102	7–18–2 (7–12–2)
January 28	7:07 pm	Michigan Tech	Propst Arena • Huntsville, Alabama	Uhelski	T 4–4 ^{SOL}	1,661	7–18–3 (7–12–3)
February 3	10:07 pm	at Alaska	Carlson Center • Fairbanks, Alaska	Uhelski	L 0–3	2,187	7–19–3 (7–13–3)
February 4	10:07 pm	at Alaska	Carlson Center • Fairbanks, Alaska	Uhelski	W 4–1	2,234	8–19–3 (8–13–3)
February 10	7:07 pm	Bemidji State	Propst Arena • Huntsville, Alabama	Uhelski	L 2–3	1,457	8–20–3 (8–14–3)
February 11	3:07 pm	Bemidji State	Propst Arena • Huntsville, Alabama	Guerrero	W 5–2	1,708	9–20–3 (9–14–3)
February 24	6:07 pm	at Bowling Green	Slater Family Ice Arena • Bowling Green, Ohio	Guerrero	L 0–7	1,876	9–21–3 (9–15–3)
February 25	6:07 pm	at Bowling Green	Slater Family Ice Arena • Bowling Green, Ohio	Uhelski	L 0–2	3,091	9–22–3 (9–16–3)
*Non-conference game. All times are in Central Time. Source:

=== Standings ===
2016–17 Western Collegiate Hockey Association standings
	Conference record								Overall record					
	GP	W	L	T	SOW	PTS	GF	GA	GP	W	L	T	GF	GA
Bemidji State†	28	20	6	2	2	64	71	44	41	22	16	3	94	79
#19 Michigan Tech*	28	15	7	6	3	54	80	59	45	23	15	7	131	100
Minnesota State	28	15	9	4	2	51	89	68	39	22	13	4	119	95
Bowling Green	28	14	13	1	1	44	79	65	41	21	18	2	120	102
Ferris State	28	12	12	4	2	42	78	74	37	13	19	5	95	101
Alaska	28	11	13	4	3	40	67	84	36	12	20	4	79	113
Lake Superior State	28	8	13	7	4	35	78	87	36	11	18	7	103	119
Northern Michigan	28	10	15	3	1	34	69	75	39	13	22	4	93	108
Alabama–Huntsville	28	9	16	3	0	30	68	95	34	9	22	3	74	120
Alaska Anchorage	28	6	16	6	2	26	52	80	34	7	21	6	59	102
Championship: March 18, 2017 † indicates conference regular season champion (MacNaughton Cup); * indicates conference tournament champion (Broadmoor Trophy); Rankings: USCHO.com Top 20 Poll; updated March 6, 2017

== Player stats ==
As of February 25, 2017

=== Skaters ===
Player	Pos	Yr	GP	G	A	Pts	PIM	PPG	SHG	GWG
Josh Kestner	F	Jr	34	9	13	22	28	2	0	2
Max McHugh	F	Jr	33	8	11	19	10	3	0	0
Cam Knight	D	So	33	3	16	19	52	0	0	0
Kurt Gosselin	D	So	30	9	9	18	51	3	0	0
Brennan Saulnier	F	Jr	29	6	9	15	64	2	0	2
Brandon Parker	D	Jr	34	6	9	15	52	3	0	1
Hans Gorowsky	F	So	32	7	6	13	23	2	2	2
Matt Salhany	F	Sr	34	7	6	13	10	0	1	1
Jordan Larson	F	Fr	34	4	7	11	18	1	0	0
Brandon Salerno	F	Fr	20	3	3	6	2	0	0	0
Tyler Poulsen	F	So	24	3	3	6	37	0	0	1
Brent Fletcher	F	Sr	34	3	2	5	26	0	1	0
John Teets	D	So	29	1	4	5	18	0	0	0
Madison Dunn	F	So	32	0	4	4	4	0	0	0
Regan Soquila	F	Sr	19	1	2	3	4	1	0	0
Austin Beaulieu	F	Fr	25	1	2	3	12	1	0	0
Cody Marooney	F	Sr	25	1	2	3	37	0	0	0
Connor James	D	Fr	8	0	3	3	10	0	0	0
Hunter Anderson	F	So	10	1	1	2	2	0	0	0
Sean Rappleyea	D	Fr	12	1	1	2	10	0	0	0
Cody Champagne	D	Jr	25	0	2	2	12	0	0	0
Brandon Carlson	D	Sr	15	0	1	1	8	0	0	0
Jetlan Houcher	F	So	7	0	0	0	0	0	0	0
Matt Larose	G	Sr	7	0	0	0	0	0	0	0
Carmine Guerriero	G	Sr	9	0	0	0	0	0	0	0
Adam Wilcox	F	So	14	0	0	0	10	0	0	0
Richard Buri	D	Jr	20	0	0	0	35	0	0	0
Jordan Uhelski	G	Jr	23	0	0	0	0	0	0	0
Team			34	74	116	190	535	18	4	9

== Goalies ==
Player	Yr	GP	TOI	W	L	T	GA	GAA	SV	SV%	SO
Jordan Uhelski	Jr	23	1230:47	6	9	3	57	2.78	551	0.906	0
Carmine Guerriero	Sr	9	476:55	1	8	0	30	3.77	205	0.872	0
Matt Larose	Sr	7	346:21	2	5	0	28	4.85	184	0.868	0
