= 2016–17 NCAA Division I men's ice hockey rankings =

- NCAA tournament: 2017
- NCAA champion: Denver
- Preseason No. 1 (USA Today): North Dakota
- Preseason No. 1 (USCHO): North Dakota
- NCAA Division I men's ice hockey rankings

Two human polls made up the 2016–17 NCAA Division I men's ice hockey rankings, the USCHO.com/CBS College Sports poll and the USA Today/USA Hockey Magazine poll. As the 2016–17 season progressed, rankings were updated weekly.

== Legend ==
	Increase in ranking
	Decrease in ranking
	Not ranked previous week
Italics	Number of first place votes
(#-#)	Win–loss–tie record
т	Tied with team above or below also with this symbol

== USCHO ==
	Preseason Sep 26	Week 1 Oct 10	Week 2 Oct 17	Week 3 Oct 24	Week 4 Oct 31	Week 5 Nov 7	Week 6 Nov 14	Week 7 Nov 21	Week 8 Nov 28	Week 9 Dec 5	Week 10 Dec 12	Week 11 Dec 19	Week 12 Jan 2	Week 13 Jan 9	Week 14 Jan 16	Week 15 Jan 23	Week 16 Jan 30	Week 17 Feb 6	Week 18 Feb 13	Week 19 Feb 20	Week 20 Feb 27	Week 21 Mar 6	Week 22 Mar 13	Week 23 Mar 20	Final Apr 10	
1.	North Dakota (43)	North Dakota (2–0–0) (45)	North Dakota (3–0–0) (50)	North Dakota (5–0–0) (50)	Minnesota-Duluth (5–1–2) (50)	Minnesota-Duluth (7–1–2) (50)	Denver (7–2–1) (26)	Minnesota-Duluth (10–2–2) (48)	Minnesota-Duluth (10–2–2) (47)	Minnesota-Duluth (10–2–2) (44)	Minnesota-Duluth (11–3–2) (42)	Minnesota-Duluth (12–3–3) (35)	Minnesota-Duluth (12–3–3) (47)	Denver (14–4–4) (27)	Penn State (16–2–1) (30)	Boston University (16–5–2) (22)	Minnesota-Duluth (17–5–4) (46)	Minnesota-Duluth (18–5–5) (46)	Minnesota-Duluth (18–5–5) (44)	Denver (22–6–4) (33)	Denver (24–6–4) (43)	Denver (26–6–4) (48)	Denver (28–6–4) (48)	Denver (29–7–4) (24)	Denver (33–7–4) (50)	1.
2.	Quinnipiac (1)	Boston University (1–0–0) (5)	Minnesota-Duluth (3–1–2)	Minnesota-Duluth (3–1–2)	Denver (6–2–0)	Denver (6–2–0)	Minnesota-Duluth (8–2–2) (18)	Denver (7–2–3) (2)	Denver (9–2–3) (3)	Denver (11–2–3) (6)	Denver (12–3–3) (4)	Denver (12–3–3) (11)	Penn State (13–1–1) (3)	Harvard (11–2–1) (11)	Denver (15–5–4) (16)	Minnesota-Duluth (15–5–4) (25)	Denver (18–6–4) (3)	Denver (18–6–4) (4)	Denver (20–6–4) (6)	Minnesota-Duluth (19–5–6) (14)	Harvard (22–5–2) (3)	Harvard (22–5–2) (1)	Harvard (24–5–2) (2)	Harvard (26–5–2) (18)	Minnesota-Duluth (28–7–7)	2.
3.	Denver	Quinnipiac (1–0–1)	Notre Dame (3–1–0)	Denver (4–2–0)	North Dakota (5–2–0)	Boston College (8–2–1)	Boston College (10–2–1) (6)	Quinnipiac (9–3–1)	Boston College (11–4–1)	Penn State (13–1–1)	Penn State (13–1–1) (4)	Penn State (13–1–1) (4)	Denver (12–4–4)	Minnesota-Duluth (12–4–4) (6)	Boston University (13–5–2) (1)	Denver (16–6–4) (2)	Boston University (17–7–2)	Boston University (18–7–2)	Harvard (17–5–2)	Harvard (20–5–2) (3)	Minnesota-Duluth (20–5–7) (4)	Minnesota-Duluth (21–6–7) (1)	Minnesota-Duluth (23–6–7)	Minnesota-Duluth (25–6–7) (8)	Harvard (28–6–2)	3.
4.	Boston University (5)	Minnesota-Duluth (2–0–2)	Quinnipiac (2–1–1)	Boston University (3–2–0)	Boston University (3–2–0)	Boston University (4–2–1)	Quinnipiac (7–3–1)	Boston College (10–3–1)	UMass Lowell (8–4–2)	Boston College (12–5–1)	Harvard (8–2–1)	Harvard (8–2–1)	Harvard (9–2–1)	Penn State (14–2–1) (6)	Minnesota-Duluth (13–5–4) (1)	Penn State (16–3–2) (1)	Union (18–6–2) (1)	Harvard (15–5–2)	Boston University (19–8–2)	Minnesota (20–8–2)	UMass Lowell (22–9–3)	UMass Lowell (22–9–3)	UMass Lowell (24–10–3)	UMass Lowell (26–10–3)	UMass Lowell (27–11–3)	4.
5.	Boston College (1)	Notre Dame (2–0–0)	UMass Lowell (2–0–2)	UMass Lowell (3–1–2)	Boston College (6–2–1)	UMass Lowell (6–2–2)	Boston University (5–3–1)	North Dakota (7–4–2)	Quinnipiac (9–4–2)	Boston University (8–4–2)	Boston College (13–6–1)	Boston University (10–5–2)	Boston University (10–5–2)	Boston University (12–5–2)	UMass Lowell (15–5–3) (2)	Union (17–5–2)	Harvard (14–5–2)	Minnesota (17–7–2)	Minnesota (18–8–2)	UMass Lowell (20–9–3)	Minnesota (21–9–2)	Minnesota (22–10–2)	Minnesota (23–10–3)	Minnesota (23–11–3)	Notre Dame (23–12–5)	5.
6.	Minnesota-Duluth	Boston College (1–1–0)	Denver (2–2–0)	Quinnipiac (3–2–1)	Quinnipiac (4–2–1)	North Dakota (5–3–1)	UMass Lowell (7–3–2)	UMass Lowell (8–4–2)	Boston University (7–4–1)	Harvard (8–2–1)	Boston University (9–5–2)	Boston College (13–6–1)	UMass Lowell (12–5–3)	UMass Lowell (14–5–3)	Harvard (11–4–1)	Minnesota (14–6–2)	Penn State (16–4–2)	Union (19–7–2)	UMass Lowell (19–9–3)	Boston University (20–9–3)	Union (23–8–3)	Union (23–8–3)	Union (25–8–3)	Boston University (23–11–3)	Boston University (24–12–3)	6.
7.	St. Cloud State	St. Cloud State (0–0–0)	Minnesota (2–0–0)	Notre Dame (3–2–1)	UMass Lowell (4–2–2)	Quinnipiac (5–3–1)	Minnesota (4–2–2)	Boston University (6–4–1)	Penn State (11–1–1)	Quinnipiac (10–5–2)	UMass Lowell (10–5–3)	UMass Lowell (10–5–3)	North Dakota (10–6–3)	North Dakota (12–6–3)	Minnesota (13–5–2)	UMass Lowell (15–7–3)	Minnesota (15–7–2)	Boston College (18–9–2)	Union (20–8–2)	Union (22–8–2)	Boston University (21–10–3)	Western Michigan (20–9–5)	Boston University (23–10–3)	Union (25–9–3)	Minnesota (23–12–3)	7.
8.	UMass Lowell	UMass Lowell (0–0–2)	Boston University (1–2–0)	Boston College (4–2–0)	St. Cloud State (4–2–0)	Minnesota (4–2–2)	North Dakota (5–4–2)	Penn State (11–1–1)	Harvard (6–2–1)	North Dakota (8–5–3)	North Dakota (9–6–3)	North Dakota (9–6–3)	Boston College (13–7–2)	Boston College (14–7–2)	North Dakota (13–7–3)	Ohio State (12–4–6)	Boston College (17–9–2)	Western Michigan (15–4–7)	Western Michigan (16–8–4)	Western Michigan (18–8–4)	Western Michigan (19–8–5)	Boston University (21–10–3)	Western Michigan (22–10–5)	Western Michigan (22–12–5)	Penn State (25–12–2)	8.
9.	Notre Dame	Minnesota (2–0–0)	Minnesota State (4–0–0)	Minnesota State (5–1–0)	Notre Dame (4–3–1)	Notre Dame (4–3–1)	Notre Dame (5–3–1)	Harvard (5–1–1)	North Dakota (7–5–3)	UMass Lowell (8–5–3)	Ohio State (9–2–4)	Ohio State (9–2–4)	Minnesota (11–5–2)	Minnesota (11–5–2)	Union (16–5–2)	Harvard (12–5–2)	Western Michigan (14–7–3)	UMass Lowell (17–9–3)	Penn State (18–6–2)	Cornell (17–6–4)	Cornell (18–6–5)	Cornell (18–6–5)	Cornell (20–7–5)	Cornell (21–8–5)	North Dakota (21–16–3)	9.
10.	Providence	Denver (0–2–0)	Boston College (2–2–0)	St. Cloud State (2–2–0)	Minnesota State (6–2–0)	Harvard (3–0–1)	Penn State (9–1–1)	Bemidji State (11–2–1)	Ohio State (8–1–4)	Ohio State (9–2–4)	Minnesota (9–5–2)	Union (14–3–2)	Union (14–4–2)	Ohio State (10–4–4)	Boston College (14–8–2)	Western Michigan (13–6–3)	UMass Lowell (15–9–3)	Penn State (16–6–2)	Providence (18–8–4)	Providence (18–9–5)	Providence (20–9–5)	Providence (22–9–5)	Notre Dame (21–10–5)	North Dakota (21–15–3)	Western Michigan (22–13–5)	10.
11.	Michigan	Providence (1–1–0)	Michigan (2–1–0)	Michigan (3–1–1)	Ohio State (5–0–2)	Minnesota State (7–3–0)	Harvard (4–1–1)	Minnesota (5–3–2)	Minnesota (6–4–2)	Minnesota (7–5–2)	Vermont (10–4–2)	Minnesota (9–5–2)	Ohio State (9–3–4)	Union (14–5–2)	Ohio State (11–4–5)	Vermont (16–7–2)	Ohio State (12–6–6)	Providence (16–8–4)	Boston College (18–11–2)	Penn State (18–8–2)	Penn State (20–8–2)	Penn State (21–9–2)	North Dakota (20–14–3)	Penn State (24–11–2)	Union (25–10–3)	11.
12.	Harvard	Harvard (0–0–0)	St. Lawrence (3–1–0)	Minnesota (2–2–0)	Harvard (2–0–0)	Penn State (7–1–1)	St. Cloud State (6–4–0)	Notre Dame (6–4–2)	Notre Dame (7–5–2)	Vermont (9–3–2)	Notre Dame (9–6–2)	Notre Dame (9–6–2)	Notre Dame (11–6–2)	Vermont (14–6–2)	Vermont (15–7–2)	North Dakota (13–9–3)	Vermont (16–8–2)	Cornell (14–6–2) т	Cornell (16–6–3)	Ohio State (16–8–6)	Notre Dame (19–10–5)	Notre Dame (19–10–5)	Providence (22–11–5)	Notre Dame (21–11–5)	Air Force (27–10–5)	12.
13.	Minnesota	Michigan (1–1–0)	Harvard (0–0–0)	Harvard (0–0–0)	Minnesota (3–2–1)	St. Cloud State (4–4–0)	Bemidji State (9–2–1)	Ohio State (8–1–4)3	Bemidji State (11–4–1)	Bemidji State (12–5–1)	Union (12–3–2)	Vermont (10–6–2)	Vermont (12–6–2)	Notre Dame (12–7–2)	Western Michigan (11–6–3)	Boston College (15–9–2)	North Dakota (14–10–3)	Ohio State (13–7–6) т	North Dakota (15–11–3)	Notre Dame (18–9–5)	Ohio State (17–9–6)	Vermont (20–11–5)	Ohio State (20–10–6)	Providence (22–11–5)	Cornell (21–9–5)	13.
14.	Bowling Green	Minnesota State (2–0–0)	St. Cloud State (0–2–0)	Providence (2–2–1)	Penn State (5–1–1)	Ohio State (5–1–3)	Ohio State (6–1–4)	Minnesota State (8–5–1)	Vermont (9–3–2)	Notre Dame (8–6–2)	Quinnipiac (10–7–2)	Quinnipiac (10–7–2)	Western Michigan (10–5–3)	Western Michigan (10–5–3)	Notre Dame (13–8–2)	Cornell (12–4–2)	St. Lawrence (15–7–6)	North Dakota (15–11–3)	Ohio State (14–8–6)	Boston College (18–12–4)	Vermont (18–11–5)	North Dakota (18–14–3)	Boston College (20–14–4)	Ohio State (21–11–6)	Ohio State (21–12–6)	14.
15.	Northeastern	St. Lawrence (1–1–0)	Providence (1–2–0)	Ohio State (3–0–2)	Providence (3–3–1)	Bemidji State (8–2–0)	Minnesota State (7–4–1)	St. Cloud State (6–6–0)	Minnesota State (8–5–1)	Union (10–3–2)	Bemidji State (13–5–2)	Bemidji State (13–6–3)	Quinnipiac (11–8–2)	Quinnipiac (12–9–2)	Cornell (11–4–1)	Notre Dame (14–8–3)	Providence (14–8–4)	Vermont (16–9–3)	Notre Dame (17–9–4)	Vermont (17–10–5)	North Dakota (16–14–3)	Ohio State (18–10–6)	Penn State (21–11–2)	Air Force (26–9–5)	Providence (22–12–5)	15.
16.	St. Lawrence	Northeastern (0–1–1)	Yale (0–0–0)	Northeastern (3–1–2)	Yale (1–0–0)	Union (8–2–1)	Michigan (5–4–1)	Michigan (5–4–1)	Western Michigan (7–3–2)	Minnesota State (9–5–2)	Western Michigan (8–5–3)	Western Michigan (8–5–3)	St. Lawrence (10–5–4)	St. Lawrence (11–6–5)	St. Lawrence (12–6–6)	St. Lawrence (13–7–6)	Cornell (12–6–2)	Notre Dame (15–9–4)	Vermont (17–10–3)	North Dakota (15–13–3)	Wisconsin (18–11–1)	Wisconsin (19–12–1)	Vermont (20–13–5)	Boston College (21–15–4)	Boston College (21–15–4)	16.
17.	Michigan Tech	Yale (0–0–0)	Northeastern (1–1–2)	Yale (0–0–0)	Michigan (3–3–1)	Providence (3–3–2)	Union (8–3–2)	Union (8–3–2)	St. Cloud State (6–6–0)	St. Cloud State (7–6–1)	St. Lawrence (10–5–3)	St. Lawrence (10–5–4)	Bemidji State (14–7–3)	Bemidji State (15–8–3)	Quinnipiac (13–10–2)	Quinnipiac (13–10–2)	Notre Dame (14–9–3)	Wisconsin (15–8–1)	St. Lawrence (15–9–6)	Air Force (21–8–5)	Boston College (18–14–4)	Boston College (18–14–4)	Air Force (24–9–5)	Wisconsin (20–15–1)	Wisconsin (20–15–1)	17.
18.	Yale	Air Force (1–0–1)	Bemidji State (4–0–0)	St. Lawrence (3–3–0)	Bemidji State (6–2–0)	Michigan (4–3–1)	Western Michigan (6–3–1)	Western Michigan (7–3–2)	Union (8–3–2)	Western Michigan (7–4–3)	St. Cloud State (8–7–1)	St. Cloud State (8–7–1)	Omaha (11–6–3)	Minnesota State (13–7–2)	Bemidji State (15–8–3)	Omaha (14–8–4)	Wisconsin (13–8–1)	St. Lawrence (15–8–6)	St. Cloud State (15–14–1)	St. Cloud State (15–14–1)	Air Force (22–9–5)	Air Force (22–9–5)	Wisconsin (19–14–1)	Vermont (20–13–5)	Vermont (20–13–5)	18.
19.	Minnesota State	Ohio State (1–0–1)	Ohio State (1–0–2)	Penn State (3–1–1)	Vermont (4–1–1)	Yale (2–1–0)	Providence (3–3–2)	St. Lawrence (8–4–2)	St. Lawrence (8–4–4)	St. Lawrence (9–5–4)	Minnesota State (10–6–2)	Minnesota State (11–7–2)	Minnesota State (11–7–2)	Cornell (9–4–1)	Omaha (13–8–3)	Providence (12–8–4)	Quinnipiac (14–11–2)	Quinnipiac (16–11–2)	Air Force (19–8–5)	Wisconsin (17–10–1)	St. Cloud State (15–16–1)	St. Lawrence (16–11–7)	Quinnipiac (23–14–2)	Michigan Tech (23–14–7)	Michigan Tech (23–15–7)	19.
20.	Ferris State	Bowling Green (0–2–0)	Omaha (2–0–0)	Bemidji State (4–2–0)	Union (6–1–1)	Lake Superior (6–2–0)	St. Lawrence (6–4–2)	Vermont (7–3–2)	Michigan (6–5–1)	Omaha (8–5–3)	Omaha (9–6–3)	Omaha (9–6–3)	St. Cloud State (9–8–1)	Michigan Tech (14–9–3)	Minnesota State (14–8–2)	Bemidji State (16–9–3)	Michigan Tech (16–9–7)	Air Force (18–8–4)	Wisconsin (15–10–1)	St. Lawrence (15–10–7)	St. Lawrence (16–11–7)	St. Cloud State (16–17–1)	Canisius (21–10–7)	Quinnipiac (23–15–2)	Quinnipiac (23–15–2)	20.
	Preseason Sep 26	Week 1 Oct 10	Week 2 Oct 17	Week 3 Oct 24	Week 4 Oct 31	Week 5 Nov 7	Week 6 Nov 14	Week 7 Nov 21	Week 8 Nov 28	Week 9 Dec 5	Week 10 Dec 12	Week 11 Dec 19	Week 12 Jan 2	Week 13 Jan 9	Week 14 Jan 16	Week 15 Jan 23	Week 16 Jan 30	Week 17 Feb 6	Week 18 Feb 13	Week 19 Feb 20	Week 20 Feb 27	Week 21 Mar 6	Week 22 Mar 13	Week 23 Mar 20	Final Apr 10	
		Dropped: Michigan Tech; Ferris State	Dropped: Air Force; Bowling Green	Dropped: Omaha	Dropped: Northeastern; St. Lawrence	Dropped: Vermont	Dropped: Yale; Lake Superior	Dropped: Providence	None	Dropped: Michigan	None	None	None	Dropped: Omaha; St. Cloud State	Dropped: Michigan Tech	Dropped: Minnesota State	Dropped: Omaha; Bemidji State	Dropped: Michigan Tech	Dropped: Quinnipiac	None	None	None	Dropped: St. Cloud State; St. Lawrence	Dropped: Canisius	None	

== USA Today ==
	Preseason Oct 3	Week 1 Oct 10	Week 2 Oct 17	Week 3 Oct 24	Week 4 Oct 31	Week 5 Nov 7	Week 6 Nov 14	Week 7 Nov 21	Week 8 Nov 28	Week 9 Dec 5	Week 10 Dec 12	Week 11 Dec 19	Week 12 Jan 2	Week 13 Jan 9	Week 14 Jan 16	Week 15 Jan 23	Week 16 Jan 30	Week 17 Feb 6	Week 18 Feb 13	Week 19 Feb 20	Week 20 Feb 27	Week 21 Mar 6	Week 22 Mar 13	Week 23 Mar 20	Week 24 Mar 27	Final Apr 10	
1.	North Dakota (28)	North Dakota (2–0–0) (28)	North Dakota (3–0–0) (34)	North Dakota (5–0–0) (34)	Minnesota-Duluth (5–1–2) (33)	Minnesota-Duluth (7–1–2) (34)	Denver (7–2–1) (19)	Minnesota-Duluth (10–2–2) (33)	Minnesota-Duluth (10–2–2) (34)	Minnesota-Duluth (10–2–2) (31)	Minnesota-Duluth (11–3–2) (32)	Minnesota-Duluth (12–3–3) (30)	Minnesota-Duluth (12–3–3) (33)	Denver (14–4–4) (18)	Denver (15–5–4) (18)	Minnesota-Duluth (15–5–4) (18)	Minnesota-Duluth (17–5–4) (30)	Minnesota-Duluth (18–5–5) (31)	Minnesota-Duluth (18–5–5) (30)	Denver (22–6–4) (21)	Denver (24–6–4) (28)	Denver (26–6–4) (33)	Denver (28–6–4) (33)	Denver (29–7–4) (13)	Denver (31–7–4) (25)	Denver (33–7–4) (34)	1.
2.	Quinnipiac	Boston University (1–0–0) (6)	Minnesota-Duluth (3–1–2)	Minnesota-Duluth (3–1–2)	Denver (6–2–0) (1)	Denver (6–2–0)	Minnesota-Duluth (8–2–2) (13)	Denver (7–2–3) (1)	Denver (9–2–3)	Denver (11–2–3) (2)	Denver (12–3–3) (1)	Denver (12–3–3) (3)	Penn State (13–1–1) (1)	Minnesota-Duluth (12–4–4) (3)	Penn State (16–2–1) (16)	Boston University (16–5–2) (13)	Denver (18–6–4) (4)	Denver (18–6–4) (3)	Denver (20–6–4) (4)	Minnesota-Duluth (19–5–6) (13)	Harvard (22–5–2) (3) т	Harvard (22–5–2) (1)	Harvard (24–5–2) (1)	Harvard (26–5–2) (15)	Harvard (28–5–2) (9)	Minnesota-Duluth (28–7–7)	2.
3.	Boston University (6)	Quinnipiac (1–0–1)	Quinnipiac (2–1–1)	Denver (4–2–0)	North Dakota (5–2–0)	Boston College (8–2–1)	Boston College (10–2–1) (2)	Boston College (10–3–1)	UMass Lowell (8–4–2)	Boston College (12–5–1)	Penn State (13–1–1) (1)	Penn State (13–1–1) (1)	Harvard (9–2–1)	Harvard (11–2–1) (5)	Minnesota-Duluth (13–5–4)	Denver (16–6–4) (3)	Boston University (17–7–2)	Boston University (18–7–2)	Harvard (17–5–2)	Harvard (20–5–2)	Minnesota-Duluth (20–5–7) (3) т	Minnesota-Duluth (21–6–7)	Minnesota-Duluth (23–6–7)	Minnesota-Duluth (25–6–7) (5)	Minnesota-Duluth (27–6–7)	Harvard (28–6–2)	3.
4.	Denver	Minnesota-Duluth (2–0–2)	Notre Dame (3–1–0)	Boston University (3–2–0)	Boston University (3–2–0)	Boston University (4–2–1)	Boston University (5–3–1)	Quinnipiac (9–3–1)	Boston College (11–4–1)	Penn State (13–1–1)	Boston College (13–6–1)	Harvard (8–2–1)	Denver (12–4–4)	Penn State (14–2–1) (8)	Boston University (13–5–2)	Penn State (16–3–2)	Penn State (16–4–2)	Minnesota (17–7–2)	Boston University (19–8–2)	Minnesota (20–8–2)	UMass Lowell (22–9–3)	UMass Lowell (22–9–3)	Minnesota (23–10–3)	UMass Lowell (26–10–3) (1)	Notre Dame (23–11–5)	Notre Dame (23–12–5)	4.
5.	Minnesota-Duluth	St. Cloud State (0–0–0)	UMass Lowell (2–0–2)	UMass Lowell (3–1–2)	Boton College (6–2–1)	UMass Lowell (6–2–2)	UMass Lowell (7–3–2)	North Dakota (7–4–2)	Boston University (7–4–1)	Boston University (8–4–2)	Harvard (8–2–1)	Boston College (13–6–1)	Boston University (10–5–2)	Boston University (12–5–2)	UMass Lowell (15–5–3)	Union (17–5–2)	Union (18–6–2)	Harvard (15–5–2)	Minnesota (18–8–2)	Boston University (20–9–3)	Minnesota (21–9–2)	Minnesota (22–10–2)	UMass Lowell (24–10–3)	Minnesota (23–11–3)	UMass Lowell (27–11–3)	UMass Lowell (27–11–3)	5.
6.	St. Cloud State	Notre Dame (2–0–0)	Denver (2–2–0)	Notre Dame (3–2–1)	UMass Lowell (4–2–2)	North Dakota (5–3–1)	Quinnipiac (7–3–1)	UMass Lowell (8–4–2)	Penn State (11–1–1)	Harvard (8–2–1)	Boston University (9–5–2)	Boston University (10–5–2)	UMass Lowell (12–5–3)	UMass Lowell (14–5–3)	Harvard (11–4–1)	Minnesota (14–6–2)	Harvard (14–5–2)	Union (19–7–2)	UMass Lowell (19–9–3)	Western Michigan (18–8–4)	Boston University (21–10–3)	Boston University (21–10–3)	Union (25–8–3)	Boston University (23–11–3)	Boston University (24–12–3)	Boston University (24–12–3)	6.
7.	UMass Lowell	UMass Lowell (0–0–2)	Minnesota (2–0–0)	Quinnipiac (3–2–1)	Quinnipiac (4–2–1)	Minnesota (4–2–2)	Minnesota (4–2–2)	Boston University (6–4–1)	Quinnipiac (9–4–2)	UMass Lowell (6–4–1)	UMass Lowell (10–5–3)	UMass Lowell (10–5–3)	North Dakota (10–6–3)	North Dakota (12–6–3)	Minnesota (13–5–2)	UMass Lowell (15–7–3)	Minnesota (15–7–2)	Boston College (18–9–2)	Union (20–8–2)	UMass Lowell (20–9–3)	Union (23–8–3)	Union (23–8–3)	Boston University (23–10–3)	Union (25–9–3)	Minnesota (23–12–3)	Minnesota (23–12–3)	7.
8.	Notre Dame	Minnesota (2–0–0)	Boston University (1–2–0)	Boston College (4–2–0)	St. Cloud State (4–2–0)	Quinnipiac (6–3–1)	North Dakota (5–4–2)	Minnesota (5–3–2)	Harvard (6–2–1)	Quinnipiac (10–5–2)	Ohio State (9–2–4)	North Dakota (9–6–3)	Boston College (13–7–2)	Boston College (14–7–2)	North Dakota (13–7–3)	Ohio State (12–4–6)	Boston College (17–9–2)	Western Michigan (15–7–4)	Penn State (18–6–2)	Union (22–8–2)	Western Michigan (19–8–5)	Western Michigan (20–9–5)	Western Michigan (22–10–5)	Western Michigan (22–12–5)	Penn State (25–12–2)	Penn State (25–12–2)	8.
9.	Boston College	Boston College (1–1–0)	Minnesota State (4–0–0)	Minnesota State (5–1–0)	Notre Dame (4–3–1)	Notre Dame (4–3–1)	Notre Dame (5–3–1)	Harvard (5–1–1)	Minnesota (6–4–2)	North Dakota (8–5–3)	North Dakota (9–6–3)	Union (14–3–2)	Minnesota (11–5–2)	Minnesota (11–5–2)	Union (16–5–2)	Harvard (12–5–2)	Western Michigan (14–7–3)	Penn State (16–6–2)	Western Michigan (16–8–4)	Cornell (17–6–4)	Cornell (18–6–5)	Cornell (18–6–5)	Notre Dame (21–10–5)	Cornell (21–8–5)	North Dakota (21–16–3)	North Dakota (21–16–3)	9.
10.	Providence	Denver (0–2–0)	Boston College (2–2–0)	St. Cloud State (2–2–0)	Minnesota State (6–2–0)	Harvard (3–0–1)	Harvard (4–1–1)	Penn State (11–1–1)	North Dakota (7–5–3)	Ohio State (9–2–4)	Vermont (10–4–2)	Ohio State (9–2–4)	Union (14–4–2)	Ohio State (10–4–4)	Boston College (14–8–2)	Western Michigan (13–6–3)	UMass Lowell (15–9–3)	UMass Lowell (17–9–3)	Providence (18–8–4)	Providence (18–9–5)	Penn State (20–8–2)	Providence (22–9–5)	Cornell (20–7–5)	North Dakota (21–15–3)	Air Force (27–10–5)	Union (25–10–3)	10.
11.	Minnesota	Providence (1–1–0)	Harvard (0–0–0)	Michigan (3–1–1)	Ohio State (5–0–2)	Minnesota State (7–3–0)	Penn State (9–1–1)	Notre Dame (6–4–2)	Ohio State (8–1–4)	Minnesota (7–5–2)	Minnesota (9–5–2)	Minnesota (9–5–2)	Ohio State (9–3–4)	Union (14–5–2)	Ohio State (11–4–5)	Boston College (15–9–2)	Ohio State (12–6–6)	North Dakota (15–11–3)	Boston College (18–11–2)	Penn State (18–8–2)	Providence (20–9–5)	Penn State (21–9–2)	North Dakota (20–14–3)	Penn State (24–11–2)	Union (25–10–3)	Air Force (27–10–5)	11.
12.	Michigan	Harvard (0–0–0)	Michigan (2–1–0)	Minnesota (2–2–0)	Harvard (2–0–0)	Penn State (7–1–1)	St. Cloud State (6–4–0)	Bemidji State (11–2–1)	Notre Dame (7–5–2)	Vermont (9–3–2)	Union (12–3–2)	Notre Dame (9–6–2)	Notre Dame (11–6–2)	Vermont (14–6–2)	Western Michigan (11–6–3)	North Dakota (13–9–3)	North Dakota (14–10–3)	Providence (16–8–4)	North Dakota (15–11–3)	Ohio State (16–8–6)	Notre Dame (19–10–5)	Notre Dame (19–10–5)	Providence (22–11–5)	Notre Dame (21–11–5)	Western Michigan (22–13–5)	Western Michigan (22–13–5)	12.
13.	Harvard	Michigan (1–1–0)	St. Lawrence (3–1–0)	Harvard (0–0–0)	Minnesota (3–2–1)	St. Cloud State (4–4–0)	Ohio State (6–1–4)	Ohio State (8–1–4)	Western Michigan (7–3–2)	Notre Dame (8–6–2)	Quinnipiac (10–7–2)	Quinnipiac (10–7–2)	Vermont (12–6–2)	Notre Dame (12–7–2)	Vermont (15–7–2)	Vermont (16–7–2)	Vermont (16–8–2)	Ohio State (13–7–6)	Cornell (16–6–3)	Boston College (18–12–4)	Ohio State (17–9–6)	North Dakota (18–14–3)	Ohio State (20–10–6)	Providence (22–11–5)	Cornell (21–9–5)	Cornell (21–9–5)	13.
14.	Northeastern	Northeastern (0–1–1)	St. Cloud State (0–2–0)	Ohio State (3–0–2)	Providence (3–3–1)	Ohio State (5–1–3)	Bemidji State (9–2–1)	Minnesota State (8–5–1)	Vermont (9–3–2)	Union (10–3–2)	Notre Dame (9–6–2)	Vermont (10–6–2)	Western Michigan (10–5–3)	Western Michigan (10–5–3)	Cornell (11–4–1)	Cornell (12–4–2)	St. Lawrence (15–7–6)	Vermont (16–9–3)	Ohio State (14–8–6)	Notre Dame (18–9–5)	Wisconsin (18–11–1)	Vermont (20–11–5)	Penn State (21–11–2)	Ohio State (21–11–6)	Ohio State (21–12–6)	Ohio State (21–12–6)	14.
15.	Bowling Green	Ohio State (1–0–1)	Providence (1–2–0)	Providence (2–2–1)	Penn State (5–1–1)	Union (8–2–1)	Minnesota State (7–4–1)	St. Cloud State (6–6–0)	Minnesota State (8–5–1)	Bemidji State (12–5–1)	Bemidji State (13–5–2)	Bemidji State (13–6–3)	Quinnipiac (11–8–2)	Quinnipiac (12–9–2)^	Notre Dame (13–8–2)	Notre Dame (14–8–3)	Providence (14–8–4)	Cornell (14–6–2)	St. Cloud State (15–14–1)	North Dakota (15–13–3)	North Dakota (16–14–3)	Ohio State (18–10–6)	Boston College (20–14–4)	Air Force (26–9–5)	Providence (22–12–5)	Providence (22–12–5)	15.
	Preseason Oct 3	Week 1 Oct 10	Week 2 Oct 17	Week 3 Oct 24	Week 4 Oct 31	Week 5 Nov 7	Week 6 Nov 14	Week 7 Nov 21	Week 8 Nov 28	Week 9 Dec 5	Week 10 Dec 12	Week 11 Dec 19	Week 12 Jan 2	Week 13 Jan 9	Week 14 Jan 16	Week 15 Jan 23	Week 16 Jan 30	Week 17 Feb 6	Week 18 Feb 13	Week 19 Feb 20	Week 20 Feb 27	Week 21 Mar 6	Week 22 Mar 13	Week 23 Mar 20	Week 24 Mar 27	Final Apr 10	
		Dropped: Bowling Green	Dropped: Northeastern; Ohio State	Dropped: St. Lawrence	Dropped: Michigan	Dropped: Providence	Dropped: Union	None	Dropped: Bemidji State; St. Cloud State	Dropped: Minnesota State; Western Michigan	None	None	Dropped: Bemidji State	None	Dropped: Quinnipiac; St. Lawrence	None	Dropped: Cornell; Notre Dame	Dropped: St. Lawrence	Dropped: Vermont	Dropped: St. Cloud State	Dropped: Boston College	Dropped: Wisconsin	Dropped: Vermont	Dropped: Boston College	None	None	

^{^}In the Week 13 poll (Jan 9) USA Today ranked Quinnipiac and St. Lawrence tied at 15th, with the Saints previously having been unranked in said poll.
