= 2015–16 North Dakota Fighting Hawks men's ice hockey season =

NCAA Division I champion Ice Breaker Tournament, champion NCHC, champion 2016 NCAA Tournament, champion
- Conference: 1st NCHC
- Home ice: Ralph Engelstad Arena

Rankings
- #1: USA Today
- #1: USCHO.com

Record
- Overall: 34–6–4
- Conference: 19–4–1
- Home: 16–2–1
- Road: 13–3–1
- Neutral: 5–1–2

Coaches and captains
- Head coach: Brad Berry
- Assistant coaches: Dane Jackson; Matt Shaw; Karl Goehring
- Captain: Gage Ausmus
- Alternate captain(s): Colten St. Clair; Bryn Chyzyk; Troy Stecher; Paul LaDue; Drake Caggiula

The 2015–16 North Dakota Fighting Hawks men's ice hockey team was the 76th season of play for the program and 3rd in the NCHC conference. The Fighting Hawks were led by first-year head coach Brad Berry, replacing Dave Hakstol who became head coach of the Philadelphia Flyers. His assistant coaches were Dane Jackson, Matt Shaw, and Karl Goehring. The Fighting Hawks played their home games in Ralph Engelstad Arena and competed in the National Collegiate Hockey Conference.

== Season ==
UND finished the regular season with a 28–5–3 record, winning the NCHC regular season title. Seeded first in the NCHC Tournament, the Fighting Hawks swept the first-round series with Colorado College, before losing to Minnesota–Duluth in the semifinals. UND entered the NCAA Tournament as the 3rd overall seed, and top seed in the Midwest Regional. In the first round, they defeated Northeastern, and topped Big Ten champion Michigan in the regional final. At the Frozen Four in Tampa, UND defeated conference foe and West Regional champion Denver on a Nick Schmaltz goal with 56 seconds remaining in regulation. The Fighting Hawks faced Quinnipiac in the final, and easily won 5–1 to claim the school's 8th national championship and first since 2000.

== Roster ==
As of December 5, 2015

No.	Nat.	Player	Class	Pos	Height	Weight	DoB	Hometown	Previous team	NHL rights
2		Troy Stecher (A)	Junior	D	5' 11" (1.8 m)	191 lb (87 kg)	1994-04-07	Richmond, British Columbia	Penticton (BCHL)	—
3		Tucker Poolman	Sophomore	D	6' 3" (1.91 m)	214 lb (97 kg)	1993-06-08	East Grand Forks, Minnesota	Omaha (USHL)	WPG, 127th overall 2013
4		Keaton Thompson	Junior	D	6' 1" (1.85 m)	200 lb (91 kg)	1995-09-14	Devils Lake, North Dakota	USNTDP (USHL)	ANA, 87th overall 2013
6		Paul LaDue (A)	Junior	D	6' 1" (1.85 m)	197 lb (89 kg)	1992-09-06	Grand Forks, North Dakota	Lincoln (USHL)	LAK, 191st overall 2012
8		Nick Schmaltz	Sophomore	F	6' 1" (1.85 m)	181 lb (82 kg)	1996-02-23	Verona, Wisconsin	Green Bay (USHL)	CHI, 20th overall 2014
9		Drake Caggiula (A)	Senior	F	5' 10" (1.78 m)	185 lb (84 kg)	1994-06-20	Pickering, Ontario	Stouffville (OJHL)	—
10		Johnny Simonson	Sophomore	F	5' 10" (1.78 m)	180 lb (82 kg)	1993-06-16	Grand Forks, North Dakota	Lincoln (USHL)	—
11		Trevor Olson	Sophomore	F	6' 2" (1.88 m)	201 lb (91 kg)	1993-11-22	Duluth, Minnesota	Sioux City (USHL)	—
13		Mike Gornall	Freshman	F	5' 11" (1.8 m)	201 lb (91 kg)	1994-10-26	Irwin, Pennsylvania	Topeka (NAHL)	—
14		Austin Poganski	Sophomore	F	6' 2" (1.88 m)	204 lb (93 kg)	1996-02-16	St. Cloud, Minnesota	Tri-City (USHL)	STL, 110th overall 2014
16		Brock Boeser	Freshman	F	6' 0" (1.83 m)	191 lb (87 kg)	1997-02-25	Burnsville, Minnesota	Waterloo (USHL)	VAN, 23rd overall 2015
17		Colten St. Clair (A)	Senior	F	5' 11" (1.8 m)	197 lb (89 kg)	1992-11-22	Gilbert, Arizona	Fargo (USHL)	—
18		Chris Wilkie	Freshman	F	5' 11" (1.8 m)	201 lb (91 kg)	1996-07-10	Omaha, Nebraska	Tri-City (USHL)	FLA, 162nd overall 2015
19		Shane Gersich	Freshman	F	5' 11" (1.8 m)	177 lb (80 kg)	1996-07-10	Chaska, Minnesota	Omaha (USHL)	WSH, 134th overall 2014
20		Gage Ausmus (C)	Junior	D	6' 2" (1.88 m)	220 lb (100 kg)	1995-04-22	East Grand Forks, Minnesota	USNTDP (USHL)	SJS, 151st overall 2013
21		Danys Chartrand	Freshman	D	6' 1" (1.85 m)	188 lb (85 kg)	1994-01-17	Winnipeg, Manitoba	Flin Flon (SJHL)	—
22		Rhett Gardner	Freshman	F	6' 2" (1.88 m)	215 lb (98 kg)	1996-02-28	Moose Jaw, Saskatchewan	Okotoks (AJHL)	—
24		Christian Wolanin	Freshman	D	6' 1" (1.85 m)	177 lb (80 kg)	1995-03-17	Rochester, Michigan	Muskegon (USHL)	OTT, 107th overall 2015
25		Joel Janatuinen	Freshman	F	6' 0" (1.83 m)	181 lb (82 kg)	1995-02-02	Espoo, Finland	Sioux City (USHL)	—
26		Coltyn Sanderson	Senior	F	6' 1" (1.85 m)	200 lb (91 kg)	1991-05-26	Moose Jaw, Saskatchewan	Weyburn (SJHL)	—
27		Luke Johnson	Junior	F	6' 0" (1.83 m)	194 lb (88 kg)	1994-09-19	Grand Forks, North Dakota	Lincoln (USHL)	CHI, 134th overall 2013
28		Hayden Shaw	Freshman	D	5' 10" (1.78 m)	191 lb (87 kg)	1996-06-05	Woodbury, Minnesota	Dubuque (USHL)	—
29		Bryn Chyzyk (A)	Senior	F	6' 0" (1.83 m)	180 lb (82 kg)	1992-11-05	Virden, Manitoba	Fargo (USHL)	—
30		Matt Hrynkiw	Junior	G	5' 9" (1.75 m)	190 lb (86 kg)	1992-04-04	Saskatoon, Saskatchewan	Humboldt (SJHL)	—
31		Matej Tomek	Freshman	G	6' 2" (1.88 m)	179 lb (81 kg)	1997-05-24	Bratislava, Slovakia	Topeka (NAHL)	PHI, 90th overall 2015
33		Cam Johnson	Sophomore	G	6' 1" (1.85 m)	198 lb (90 kg)	1994-07-11	Troy, Michigan	Waterloo (USHL)	—
35		Ryan Anderson	Freshman	G	6' 2" (1.88 m)	194 lb (88 kg)	1995-10-01	Roseau, Minnesota	Minnesota Wilderness (NAHL)	—

== Schedule ==
Date	Time	Opponent^{#}	Rank^{#}	Site	Decision	Result	Attendance	Record
Exhibition
October 3	7:00 pm	Manitoba*	#4	Ralph Engelstad Arena • Grand Forks, North Dakota (Exhibition)	Johnson	W 8–3	10,590	—
Regular season
October 9	3:30 pm	vs. Lake Superior State*	#4	Cross Insurance Arena • Portland, Maine (IceBreaker)	Johnson	W 5–2	5,007	1–0–0
October 10	7:00 pm	vs. Maine*	#4	Cross Insurance Arena • Portland, Maine (IceBreaker)	Johnson	T 1–1 ^{OT}	5,187	1–0–1
October 16	7:30 pm	at Bemidji State*	#1	Sanford Center • Bemidji, Minnesota	Hrynkiw	T 4–4 ^{OT}	4,373	1–0–2
October 17	7:00 pm	Bemidji State*	#1	Ralph Engelstad Arena • Grand Forks, North Dakota	Hrynkiw	W 5–2	11,888	2–0–2
October 23	6:00 pm	at Vermont*	#1	Gutterson Fieldhouse • Burlington, Vermont	Hrynkiw	W 2–0	4,003	3–0–2
October 24	6:00 pm	at Vermont*	#1	Gutterson Fieldhouse • Burlington, Vermont	Hrynkiw	W 5–2	4,007	4–0–2
October 30	8:30 pm	at Colorado College	#1	Colorado Springs World Arena • Colorado Springs, Colorado	Hrynkiw	W 5–2	6,043	5–0–2 (1–0–0)
October 31	8:00 pm	at Colorado College	#1	Colorado Springs World Arena • Colorado Springs, Colorado	Hrynkiw	W 2–0	4,032	6–0–2 (2–0–0)
November 6	7:30 pm	Wisconsin*	#1	Ralph Engelstad Arena • Grand Forks, North Dakota	Hrynkiw	L 1–3	11,788	6–1–2 (2–0–0)
November 7	7:00 pm	Wisconsin*	#1	Ralph Engelstad Arena • Grand Forks, North Dakota	Hrynkiw	W 3–1	11,826	7–1–2 (2–0–0)
November 13	7:30 pm	#17 Miami (OH)	#3	Ralph Engelstad Arena • Grand Forks, North Dakota	Hrynkiw	W 6–2	11,662	8–1–2 (3–0–0)
November 14	7:00 pm	#17 Miami (OH)	#3	Ralph Engelstad Arena • Grand Forks, North Dakota	Hrynkiw	W 4–3 ^{OT}	11,892	9–1–2 (4–0–0)
November 20	7:30 pm	at #7 St. Cloud State	#4	Herb Brooks National Hockey Center • St. Cloud, Minnesota	Hrynkiw	W 4–3	5,050	10–1–2 (5–0–0)
November 21	7:00 pm	at #7 St. Cloud State	#4	Herb Brooks National Hockey Center • St. Cloud, Minnesota	Hrynkiw	L 1–6	5,487	10–2–2 (5–1–0)
November 27	6:00 pm	at Michigan State*	#5	Munn Ice Arena • East Lansing, Michigan	Johnson	W 3–1	4,836	11–2–2 (5–1–0)
November 29	2:00 pm	at Michigan State*	#5	Munn Ice Arena • East Lansing, Michigan	Johnson	W 4–1	3,618	12–2–2 (5–1–0)
December 4	7:30 pm	#9 Denver	#4	Ralph Engelstad Arena • Grand Forks, North Dakota	Johnson	W 5–1	11,768	13–2–2 (6–1–0)
December 5	7:00 pm	#9 Denver	#4	Ralph Engelstad Arena • Grand Forks, North Dakota	Johnson	W 4–0	11,842	14–2–2 (7–1–0)
December 11	7:00 pm	at #17 Minnesota–Duluth	#4	Amsoil Arena • Duluth, Minnesota	Johnson	W 3–0	6,836	15–2–2 (8–1–0)
December 12	7:00 pm	at #17 Minnesota–Duluth	#4	Amsoil Arena • Duluth, Minnesota	Johnson	W 3–0	6,975	16–2–2 (9–1–0)
January 1	7:30 pm	Alabama–Huntsville*	#2	Ralph Engelstad Arena • Grand Forks, North Dakota	Johnson	W 1–0	11,334	17–2–2 (9–1–0)
January 2	7:00 pm	Alabama–Huntsville*	#2	Ralph Engelstad Arena • Grand Forks, North Dakota	Johnson	W 4–1	11,094	18–2–2 (9–1–0)
January 9	7:00 pm	US Under-18 Team*	#1	Ralph Engelstad Arena • Grand Forks, North Dakota (Exhibition)	Johnson	W 4–1	10,950	—
January 15	7:30 pm	#9 Omaha	#1	Ralph Engelstad Arena • Grand Forks, North Dakota	Johnson	L 3–4 ^{OT}	11,885	18–3–2 (9–2–0)
January 16	7:00 pm	#9 Omaha	#1	Ralph Engelstad Arena • Grand Forks, North Dakota	Johnson	W 5–1	11,888	19–3–2 (10–2–0)
January 22	7:30 pm	Colorado College	#2	Ralph Engelstad Arena • Grand Forks, North Dakota	Hrynkiw	W 5–5 ^{SO, 1–0}	11,823	19–3–3 (10–2–1)
January 23	7:00 pm	Colorado College	#2	Ralph Engelstad Arena • Grand Forks, North Dakota	Johnson	W 5–1	11,908	20–3–3 (11–2–1)
January 29	6:00 pm	at Western Michigan	#2	Lawson Ice Arena • Kalamazoo, Michigan	Johnson	W 2–0	3,342	21–3–3 (12–2–1)
January 30	7:00 pm	at Western Michigan	#2	Lawson Ice Arena • Kalamazoo, Michigan	Johnson	W 2–1	3,609	22–3–3 (13–2–1)
February 12	9:00 pm	at #13 Denver	#2	Magness Arena • Denver, Colorado	Johnson	L 4–6	6,064	22–4–3 (13–3–1)
February 13	7:00 pm	at #13 Denver	#2	Magness Arena • Denver, Colorado	Johnson	L 1–4	6,170	22–5–3 (13–4–1)
February 19	7:30 pm	Minnesota–Duluth	#4	Ralph Engelstad Arena • Grand Forks, North Dakota	Johnson	W 2–1 ^{OT}	11,890	23–5–3 (14–4–1)
February 20	7:00 pm	Minnesota–Duluth	#4	Ralph Engelstad Arena • Grand Forks, North Dakota	Johnson	W 2–1	11,912	24–5–3 (15–4–1)
February 26	7:00 pm	at #13 Omaha	#4	Baxter Arena • Omaha, Nebraska	Johnson	W 4–2	7,898	25–5–3 (16–4–1)
February 27	7:00 pm	at #13 Omaha	#4	Baxter Arena • Omaha, Nebraska	Johnson	W 4–1	7,898	26–5–3 (17–4–1)
March 4	8:00 pm	Western Michigan	#2	Ralph Engelstad Arena • Grand Forks, North Dakota	Johnson	W 8–1	11,848	27–5–3 (18–4–1)
March 5	7:00 pm	Western Michigan	#2	Ralph Engelstad Arena • Grand Forks, North Dakota	Hrynkiw	W 5–4	11,903	28–5–3 (19–4–1)
NCHC Tournament
March 11	7:30 pm	Colorado College*	#2	Ralph Engelstad Arena • Grand Forks, North Dakota (NCHC First round)	Johnson	W 7–1	10,813	29–5–3 (19–4–1)
March 12	7:00 pm	Colorado College*	#2	Ralph Engelstad Arena • Grand Forks, North Dakota (NCHC First round)	Johnson	W 5–1	10,864	30–5–3 (19–4–1)
March 18	4:00 pm	vs. #16 Minnesota–Duluth*	#1	Target Center • Minneapolis, Minnesota (NCHC Semifinal)	Johnson	L 2–4	10,926	30–6–3 (19–4–1)
March 19	3:30 pm	vs. #6 Denver*	#1	Target Center • Minneapolis, Minnesota (NCHC Third Place)	Johnson	T 1–1 ^{OT}	11,643	30–6–4 (19–4–1)
NCAA Tournament
March 25	1:00 pm	vs. #9 Northeastern*	#3	U.S. Bank Arena • Cincinnati, Ohio (Midwest Regional semifinal)	Johnson	W 6–2	5,332	31–6–4 (19–4–1)
March 26	5:00 pm	vs. #5 Michigan*	#3	U.S. Bank Arena • Cincinnati, Ohio (Midwest Regional Final)	Johnson	W 5–2	5,172	32–6–4 (19–4–1)
April 7	7:30 pm	vs. #7 Denver*	#3	Amalie Arena • Tampa, Florida (Frozen Four Semifinal)	Johnson	W 4–2	18,037	33–6–4 (19–4–1)
April 9	7:00 pm	vs. #1 Quinnipiac*	#3	Amalie Arena • Tampa, Florida (Frozen Four Final)	Johnson	W 5–1	19,358	34–6–4 (19–4–1)
*Non-conference game. ^{#}Rankings from USCHO.com Poll. All times are in Central Time. Source:

=== Standings ===
2015–16 National Collegiate Hockey Conference standings
	Conference record								Overall record					
	GP	W	L	T	SOW	PTS	GF	GA	GP	W	L	T	GF	GA
#1 North Dakota†	24	19	4	1	1	59	89	49	44	34	6	4	162	81
#4 St. Cloud State*	24	17	6	1	1	53	104	53	41	31	9	1	175	90
#6 Denver	24	17	5	2	0	53	74	52	41	25	10	6	134	96
#16 Minnesota–Duluth	24	11	10	3	1	37	64	44	40	19	16	5	107	82
Miami	24	9	13	2	2	31	54	65	36	15	18	3	86	97
Omaha	24	8	15	1	0	25	60	83	36	18	17	1	103	107
Western Michigan	24	5	18	1	1	17	56	103	36	8	25	3	80	142
Colorado College	24	4	19	1	0	13	47	99	36	6	29	1	71	145
Champions: St. Cloud State † indicates conference regular season champion; * indicates conference tournament champion Rankings: USCHO.com Top 20 Poll; updated March 13, 2016

== Statistics ==
As of April 9, 2016

=== Skaters ===
Player	Pos	Yr	GP	G	A	Pts	PIM	PPG	SHG	GWG
Brock Boeser	F	Fr	42	27	33	60	26	5	1	5
Drake Caggiula	F	Sr	39	25	26	51	60	3	2	7
Nick Schmaltz	F	So	37	11	35	46	6	2	0	3
Troy Stecher	D	Jr	43	8	21	29	37	1	0	1
Austin Poganski	F	So	44	10	15	25	18	2	1	5
Tucker Poolman	D	So	40	5	19	24	4	1	0	1
Bryn Chyzyk	F	Sr	42	12	10	22	12	2	2	2
Luke Johnson	F	Jr	43	11	10	21	45	5	1	2
Paul LaDue	D	Jr	41	5	14	19	14	2	0	0
Rhett Gardner	F	Fr	41	11	7	18	52	2	2	2
Johnny Simonson	F	So	43	3	14	17	38	0	0	1
Keaton Thompson	D	Jr	43	2	15	17	36	1	0	0
Christian Wolanin	D	Fr	32	4	11	15	20	0	0	2
Coltyn Sanderson	F	Sr	35	7	5	12	8	0	0	1
Shane Gersich	F	Fr	37	9	2	11	16	0	0	1
Gage Ausmus	D	Jr	42	0	11	11	33	0	0	0
Chris Wilkie	F	Fr	32	5	4	9	14	3	0	0
Joel Janatuinen	F	Fr	35	4	5	9	10	1	0	1
Hayden Shaw	D	Fr	32	2	4	6	10	1	0	0
Trevor Olson	F	So	36	0	4	4	20	0	0	0
Mike Gornall	F	Fr	3	1	0	1	2	0	0	0
Colten St. Clair	F	Sr	10	0	0	0	4	0	0	0
Matt Hrynkiw	G	Jr	14	0	0	0	0	0	0	0
Cam Johnson	G	So	34	0	0	0	0	0	0	0
Team			44	162	265	427	485	31	9	34

=== Goaltenders ===
Player	Yr	GP	TOI	W	L	T	GA	GAA	SV	SV%	SO
Cam Johnson	So	34	1918	24	4	2	53	1.66	759	0.935	5
Matt Hrynkiw	Jr	14	734	10	2	2	26	2.13	262	0.910	2

== 2016 championship game ==
=== MW1 North Dakota vs. E1 Quinnipiac ===
April 9, 2016; 8:00 pm ESPN	(E1) Quinnipiac	1 – 5 (1–2, 0–0, 0–3)	(MW1) North Dakota	Amalie Arena – Tampa, Florida; Attendance: 19,358

Game reference
Referees: Steve McInchak; Colin Kronforst; Linesmen: Brett DesRosiers; Johnathan Morrison

Scoring summary
Period	Team	Goal	Assist(s)	Time	Score
1st	UND	Shane Gersich (9)	Ausmus and Boeser	11:56	1–0 UND
1st	UND	Brock Boeser (27) – GW SH	unassisted	14:16	2–0 UND
1st	QUI	Tim Clifton (19) – PP	C. Clifton and St. Denis	18:53	2–1 UND
2nd	None				
3rd	UND	Drake Caggiula (24)	Schmaltz and Boeser	41:21	3–1 UND
3rd	UND	Drake Caggiula (25)	Boeser and LaDue	43:41	4–1 UND
3rd	UND	Austin Poganski (10)	Gardner and Ausmus	50:41	5–1 UND
Penalty summary
Period	Team	Player	Penalty	Time	PIM
1st	UND	Bryn Chyzyk	Slashing	09:57	2:00
1st	QUI	Travis St. Denis	Slashing	09:57	2:00
1st	UND	Paul LaDue	Tripping	13:19	2:00
1st	UND	Drake Caggiula	Cross-Checking	18:41	2:00
1st	UND	Troy Stecher	Cross-Checking	18:50	2:00
2nd	UND	Drake Caggiula	High-Sticking	22:13	2:00
2nd	UND	Christian Wolanin	Roughing	25:02	2:00
2nd	QUI	Sam Anas	Roughing	25:02	2:00
2nd	QUI	Tommy Schutt	Hooking	30:45	2:00
3rd	QUI	Derek Smith	Cross-Checking	46:36	2:00
3rd	UND	Joel Janatuinen	Roughing	57:34	2:00
3rd	QUI	Connor Clifton	Roughing	57:34	2:00

Shots by period
Team	1	2	3	T
Quinnipiac	13	9	11	33
North Dakota	16	9	11	36

Goaltenders
Team	Name	Saves	Goals against	Time on ice
QUI	Michael Garteig	31	5	60:00
UND	Cam Johnson	32	1	60:00
