= 2016 NCAA Division I men's ice hockey tournament =

- 2016 Frozen Four logo
- Teams: 16
- Finals site: Amalie Arena, Tampa, Florida
- Champions: North Dakota Fighting Hawks (8th title)
- Runner-up: Quinnipiac Bobcats (2nd title game)
- Semifinalists: Boston College Eagles (25th Frozen Four); Denver Pioneers (15th Frozen Four)
- Winning coach: Brad Berry (1st title)
- MOP: Drake Caggiula (North Dakota)
- Attendance: 19,358 (Championship); 55,211 (Frozen Four); 115,261 (Tournament)

The 2016 NCAA Division I men's ice hockey tournament was the national championship tournament for men's college ice hockey in the United States in 2016. The tournament involved 16 teams in single-elimination play to determine the national champion at the Division I level of the NCAA, the highest level of competition in college hockey. The tournament's Frozen Four – the semifinals and finals – were hosted by the University of Wisconsin and the Tampa Bay Sports Commission at Amalie Arena in Tampa, Florida.

North Dakota defeated Quinnipiac 5–1 to win the program's 8th NCAA title.

This is the first time in NCAA college hockey history that a first year coach, Brad Berry, won the NCAA title.

== Tournament procedure ==
2016 Regionals (blue) and Frozen Four (red)

The tournament consisted of four groups of four teams in regional brackets. The four regionals are officially named after their geographic areas. The following were the sites for the 2016 regionals:

March 25–26
Midwest Regional, US Bank Arena – Cincinnati (Host: Miami University)
Northeast Regional, DCU Center – Worcester, Massachusetts (Host: Holy Cross)
March 26–27
East Regional, Times Union Center – Albany, New York (Host: ECAC Hockey)
West Regional, Xcel Energy Center – St. Paul, Minnesota (Host: University of Minnesota)

The winner of each regional advanced to the Frozen Four:

April 7–9
Amalie Arena – Tampa, Florida (Host: University of Wisconsin)

== Qualifying teams ==
The at-large bids and seeding for each team in the tournament were announced on March 20. Hockey East had six teams receive a berth in the tournament, NCHC had four teams receive a berth, ECAC Hockey had three teams receive a berth, and one team from the Big Ten Conference, Atlantic Hockey, and the Western Collegiate Hockey Association (WCHA) received a berth.

Midwest Regional – Cincinnati							Northeast Regional – Worcester						
Seed	School	Conference	Record	Berth type	Appearance	Last bid	Seed	School	Conference	Record	Berth type	Appearance	Last bid
1	North Dakota (3)	NCHC	30–6–4	At-large bid	31st	2015	1	Providence (4)	Hockey East	27–6–4	At-large bid	12th	2015
2	Michigan	Big Ten	24–7–5	Tournament champion	36th	2012	2	Boston College	Hockey East	26–7–5	At-large bid	35th	2015
3	Notre Dame	Hockey East	19–10–7	At-large bid	8th	2014	3	Harvard	ECAC	19–10–4	At-large bid	23rd	2015
4	Northeastern	Hockey East	22–13–5	Tournament champion	5th	2009	4	Minnesota-Duluth	NCHC	18–15–5	At-large bid	10th	2015
East Regional – Albany							West Regional – Saint Paul						
Seed	School	Conference	Record	Berth type	Appearance	Last bid	Seed	School	Conference	Record	Berth type	Appearance	Last bid
1	Quinnipiac (1)	ECAC	29–3–7	Tournament champion	5th	2015	1	St. Cloud State (2)	NCHC	31–8–1	Tournament champion	12th	2015
2	UMass Lowell	Hockey East	24–9–5	At-large bid	7th	2014	2	Denver	NCHC	23–9–6	At-large bid	26th	2015
3	Yale	ECAC	19–8–4	At-large bid	8th	2015	3	Boston University	Hockey East	21–12–5	At-large bid	34th	2015
4	RIT	Atlantic Hockey	18–14–6	Tournament champion	3rd	2015	4	Ferris State	WCHA	19–14–6	Tournament champion	4th	2014

Number in parentheses denotes overall seed in the tournament.

== Tournament bracket ==
Regional semifinals March 25–26
1	Quinnipiac (1)	4
4	RIT	0
Albany, New York – Sat/Sun
2	UMass Lowell	3*
3	Yale	2
1	Providence (4)	1
4	Minnesota–Duluth	2**
Worcester, Massachusetts – Fri/Sat
2	Boston College	4
3	Harvard	1
1	St. Cloud State (2)	4
4	Ferris State	5*
St. Paul, Minnesota – Sat/Sun
2	Denver	7
3	Boston University	2
1	North Dakota (3)	6
4	Northeastern	2
Cincinnati – Fri/Sat
2	Michigan	3*
3	Notre Dame	2

Regional Finals; March 26–27
1	Quinnipiac	4
2	UMass Lowell	1
4	Minnesota–Duluth	2
2	Boston College	3
4	Ferris State	3
2	Denver	6
1	North Dakota	5
2	Michigan	2

Semifinals; April 7
E1	Quinnipiac	3
NE2	Boston College	2
W2	Denver	2
MW1	North Dakota	4

Championship; April 9
E1	Quinnipiac	1
MW1	North Dakota	5

Note: * denotes overtime period(s)

== Results ==
=== East Region – Albany, New York ===
==== Regional semifinal ====
March 26, 2016; 4:00 pm	(1) Quinnipiac	4 – 0 (1–0, 0–0, 3–0)	(4) RIT	Times Union Center – Albany, New York; Attendance: 5,326

Game reference

Michael Garteig
Goalies
Mike Rotolo
Referees:
Geoff Miller
Kevin Shea
Linesmen:
Marc Sullivan
Bob Bernard

Travis St. Denis (21) (Anas, Toews) – GW – 14:55	1–0
Scott Davidson (8) (T. Clifton, Toews) – 42:27	2–0
Soren Jonzzon (9) (C. Clifton, T. Clifton) – 52:18	3–0
Soren Jonzzon (10) (Toews) – EN – 57:10	4–0

8 min
Penalties
8 min
30
Shots
27

March 26, 2016; 7:30 pm	(2) Massachusetts–Lowell	3 – 2 (OT) (1–1, 0–1, 1–0, 1–0)	(3) Yale	Times Union Center – Albany, New York; Attendance: 7,326

Game reference

Kevin Boyle
Goalies
Alex Lyon
Referees:
Ryan Sweeney
Eugene Binda, Jr.
Linesmen:
Tony Carissimo
Brendan Blanchard

Michael Fallon (2) (Louria, White) – 4:27	1–0
	1–1	15:19 – Frankie DiChiara (7) (Learned)
	1–2	32:18 – Ryan Hitchcock (8) (Hart)
Joe Gambardella (9) (Smith) – 46:12	2–2
Joe Gambardella (10) (Edwardh, Forney) – GW – 61:37	3–2

2 min
Penalties
6 min
31
Shots
37

==== Regional Final ====
March 27, 2016; 7:30 pm	(1) Quinnipiac	4 – 1 (0–1, 3–0, 1–0)	(2) Massachusetts–Lowell	Times Union Center – Albany, New York; Attendance: 2,975

Game reference

Michael Garteig
Goalies
Kevin Boyle
Referees:
Geno Binda Jr.
Todd Anderson
Linesmen:
Paul Carnathan
John Philo

	0–1	03:01 – PP – Dylan Zink (11) (Forney, Edwardh)
Landon Smith (11) (unassisted) – 30:33	1–1
Sam Anas (24) (McKernan) – GW – 32:11	2–1
Scott Davidson (9) (Jonzzon) – 37:51	3–1
Travis St. Denis (22) (unassisted) – 56:06	4–1

8 min
Penalties
2 min
35
Shots
15

=== West Region – Saint Paul, Minnesota ===
==== Regional semifinal ====
March 26, 2016; 2:00 pm	(1) St. Cloud State	4 – 5 (OT) (1–2, 1–2, 2–0, 0–1)	(4) Ferris State	Xcel Energy Center – Saint Paul, Minnesota; Attendance: 4,926

Game reference

Charlie Lindgren
Goalies
Darren Smith
Referees:
Jamie Koharski
Cameron Voss
Linesmen:
Tommy George
Kevin Briganti

	0–1	02:56 – Mitch Maloney (6) (Anselmini)
Jacob Benson (4) (Jackson, Winiecki) – 03:13	1–1
	1–2	19:37 – Jared VanWormer (6) (Recktenwald)
	1–3	21:04 – Kenny Babinski (10) (Robertson, Lowney)
Mikey Eyssimont (13) (Kossila, Prow) – PP – 24:56	2–3
	2–4	32:01 – Gerald Mayhew (15) (VanWormer)
Mikey Eyssimont (14) (Benik, Kossila) – PP – 44:38	3–4
Joey Benik (17) (Murray, Schuldt) – 51:29	4–4
	4–5	60:18 – GW – Jared VanWormer (7) (Mayhew)

4 min
Penalties
8 min
33
Shots
31

March 26, 2016; 5:45 pm	(2) Denver	7 – 2 (2–0, 3–0, 2–2)	(3) Boston University	Xcel Energy Center – Saint Paul, Minnesota; Attendance: 4,926

Game reference

Tanner Jaillet
Goalies
Sean Maguire (out 22:58)
Connor LaCouvee (in 22:58)
Referees:
Chris Perrault
Pete Friesma
Linesmen:
Rick Nelson
Matt Tyree

Blake Hillman (2) (Janssen, Terry) – 13:49	1–0
Dylan Gambrell (16) (Heinen) – 17:40	2–0
Will Butcher (7) (Heinen, Terry) – GW PP – 20:24	3–0
Matt Marcinew (11) (Lukosevicius) – 22:58	4–0
Evan Janssen (5) (Terry, Shore) – 35:48	5–0
Will Butcher (8) (Heinen, Shore) – 43:23	6–0
	6–1	52:45 – PP – Danny O'Regan (6) (Forsbacka Karlsson, McAvoy)
Trevor Moore (10) (Zajac, Shore) – 54:07	7–1
	7–2	59:45 – Mike Moran (5) (Grzelcyk, Greenway)

4 min
Penalties
11 min
25
Shots
21

==== Regional Final ====
March 27, 2016; 8:00 pm	(2) Denver	6 – 3 (2–2, 1–0, 3–1)	(4) Ferris State	Xcel Energy Center – Saint Paul, Minnesota; Attendance: 2,799

Game reference

Tanner Jaillet
Goalies
Darren Smith
Referees:
Ryan Sweeney
Chris Ciamaga
Linesmen:
Steve Walters
Jared Waitt

Danton Heinen (20) (Gambrell, Hillman) – PP – 05:34	1–0
	1–1	15:13 – Gerald Mayhew (16) (Dorantes, Schempp)
Dylan Gambrell (17) (Heinen) – 18:40	2–1
	2–2	19:40 – Corey Mackin (10) (Mayhew, Denis)
Trevor Moore (11) (Hillman, VanVoorhis) – 22:49	3–2
	3–3	47:17 – Kyle Schempp (9) (Mackin, Mayhew)
Blake Hillman (3) (Heinen, Gambrell) – GW – 55:28	4–3
Nolan Zajac (3) (Shore, Terry) – 55:53	5–3
Quentin Shore (13) (Janssen, Terry) – PP – 57:33	6–3

6 min
Penalties
19 min
42
Shots
21

=== Midwest Region – Cincinnati ===
==== Regional semifinal ====
March 25, 2016; 2:00 pm	(1) North Dakota	6 – 2 (3–1, 2–0, 1–1)	(4) Northeastern	US Bank Arena – Cincinnati; Attendance: 5,332

Game reference

Cam Johnson
Goalies
Ryan Ruck
Referees:
Chip McDonald
Bob St. Lawrence
Linesmen:
Jim Briggs
Glenn Cooke

	0–1	03:07 – Nolan Stevens (20) (Cockerill)
Johnny Simonson (9) (Thompson, Olson) – 05:43	1–1
Tucker Poolman (5) (Boeser, Schmaltz) – 10:22	2–1
Luke Johnson (10) (Gardner, Thompson) – GW PP – 16:55	3–1
Bryn Chyzyk (12) (Sanderson) – 25:11	4–1
Brock Boeser (26) (unassisted) – 27:05	5–1
	5–2	45:25 – Matt Benning (6) (McMurtry, Roy)
Drake Caggiula (20) (Schmaltz, Boeser) – 52:15	6–2

4 min
Penalties
2 min
36
Shots
26

March 25, 2016; 5:30 pm	(2) Michigan	3 – 2 (OT) (1–1, 0–1, 1–0, 1–0)	(3) Notre Dame	US Bank Arena – Cincinnati; Attendance: 5,332

Game reference

Steve Racine
Goalies
Cal Petersen
Referees:
Kevin Curtis
Cam Lynch
Linesmen:
Ryan Knapp
Dan Taggart

Justin Selman (13) (Kile, Downing) – 10:31	1–0
	1–1	15:46 – Anders Bjork (12) (unassisted)
	1–2	20:24 – Thomas Di Pauli (14) (Bjork)
Zach Werenski (11) (Nieves, Boka) – 49:52	2–2
Tyler Motte (32) (Compher, Connor) – GW – 68:19	3–2

4 min
Penalties
0 min
35
Shots
30

==== Regional Final ====
March 26, 2016; 6:00 pm	(1) North Dakota	5 – 2 (1–0, 1–1, 3–1)	(2) Michigan	US Bank Arena – Cincinnati; Attendance: 5,172

Game reference

Cam Johnson
Goalies
Steve Racine
Referees:
Chip McDonald
Bob St. Lawrence
Linesmen:
Jim Briggs
Glenn Cooke

Drake Caggiula (21) (Stecher) – 18:54	1–0
	1–1	25:33 – J. T. Compher (15) (Selman, Motte)
Luke Johnson (11) (unassisted) – 39:14	2–1
	2–2	48:39 – PP – J. T. Compher (16) (Connor, Werenski)
Rhett Gardner (10) (LaDue, Poganski) – GW – 52:03	3–2
Coltyn Sanderson (7) (Poolman, Janatuinen) – 53:17	4–2
Paul LaDue (5) (unassisted) – EN – 58:19	5–2

4 min
Penalties
8 min
49
Shots
27

=== Northeast Region – Worcester, Massachusetts ===
==== Regional semifinal ====
March 25, 2016; 4:30 pm	(1) Providence	1 – 2 OT (0–0, 0–0, 1–1, 0–1)	(4) Minnesota–Duluth	DCU Center – Worcester, Massachusetts; Attendance: 6,682

Game reference

Nick Ellis
Goalies
Kasimir Kaskisuo
Referees:
Steve McInchak
Barry Pochmara
Linesmen:
Brett DesRosiers
Johnathan Morrison

	0–1	43:18 – Tony Cameranesi (11) (unassisted)
Steven McParland (4) (Tait, Parisi) – 47:22	1–1
	1–2	60:57 – GW – Karson Kuhlman (11) (Raskob, Cameranesi)

21 min
Penalties
6 min
37
Shots
56

March 25, 2016; 9:10 pm	(2) Boston College	4 – 1 (2–0, 1–1, 1–0)	(3) Harvard	DCU Center – Worcester, Massachusetts; Attendance: 6,682

Game reference

Thatcher Demko
Goalies
Merrick Madsen
Referees:
Colin Kronfrost
Marco Hunt
Linesmen:
Nick Bradshaw
Sam Shikowsky

Alex Tuch (16) (White, R. Fitzgerald) – 07:59	1–0
Austin Cangelosi (19) (Wood, C. Fitzgerald) – GW PP – 18:58	2–0
Alex Tuch (17) (Savage) – 21:59	3–0
	3–1	29:50 – Seb Lloyd (7) (Horton, Anderson)
Austin Cangelosi (20) (Calnan) – SH EN – 57:33	4–1

4 min
Penalties
2 min
33
Shots
25

==== Regional Final ====
March 26, 2016; 9:00 pm	(2) Boston College	3 – 2 (1–0, 1–0, 1–2)	(4) Minnesota–Duluth	DCU Center – Worcester, Massachusetts; Attendance: 4,572

Game reference

Thatcher Demko
Goalies
Kasimir Kaskisuo
Referees:
Steve McInchak
Colin Kronfrost
Linesmen:
Brett DesRosiers
Johnathan Morrison

Teddy Doherty (12) (Gilmour) – 14:06	1–0
Teddy Doherty (13) (Sanford, Calnan) – 23:32	2–0
Ryan Fitzgerald (23) (Savage, C. Fitzgerald) – GW PP – 46:35	3–0
	3–1	52:49 – Austin Farley (15) (Raskob, Iafallo)
	3–2	55:34 – Karson Kuhlman (12) (Farley, Cameranesi)

8 min
Penalties
10 min
34
Shots
30

=== Frozen Four – Tampa, Florida ===
==== Semifinal ====
April 7, 2016; 5:00 pm ESPN2	(E1) Quinnipiac	3 – 2 (2–0, 1–1, 0–1)	(NE2) Boston College	Amalie Arena – Tampa, Florida; Attendance: 17,816

Game reference

Michael Garteig
Goalies
Thatcher Demko
Referees:
Gino Binda
Todd Anderson
Linesmen:
Paul Carnathan
John Philo

Kevin McKernan (4) (unassisted) – 02:31	1–0
Andrew Taverner (6) (St. Denis) – 07:20	2–0
	2–1	20:23 – Alex Tuch (18) (White, C. Fitzgerald)
Landon Smith (12) (Clifton, St. Denis) – GW PP – 24:32	3–1
	3–2	55:44 – PP – Ryan Fitzgerald (24) (McCoshen, Doherty)

12 min
Penalties
8 min
30
Shots
36

April 7, 2016; 8:50 pm ESPN2	(MW1) North Dakota	4 – 2 (0–0, 2–0, 2–2)	(W2) Denver	Amalie Arena – Tampa, Florida; Attendance: 18,037

Game reference

Cam Johnson
Goalies
Tanner Jaillet
Referees:
Jamie Koharski
Cameron Voss
Linesmen:
Kevin Briganti
Tommy George

Drake Caggiula (22) (Boeser, Sanderson) – 21:03	1–0
Drake Caggiula (23) (unassisted) – 26:15	2–0
	2–1	42:50 – Will Butcher (9) (Arnold, Marcinew)
	2–2	50:51 – Matt VanVoorhis (3) (Levin, Hillman)
Nick Schmaltz (11) (Boeser, Caggiula) – GW – 59:03	3–2
Rhett Gardner (11) (Stecher) – EN – 59:58	4–2

8 min
Penalties
2 min
23
Shots
23

=== National Championship – Tampa, Florida ===
April 9, 2016; 8:00 pm ESPN	(E1) Quinnipiac	1 – 5 (1–2, 0–0, 0–3)	(MW1) North Dakota	Amalie Arena – Tampa, Florida; Attendance: 19,358

Game reference
Referees: Steve McInchak; Colin Kronforst; Linesmen: Brett DesRosiers; Johnathan Morrison

Scoring summary
Period	Team	Goal	Assist(s)	Time	Score
1st	UND	Shane Gersich (9)	Ausmus and Boeser	11:56	1–0 UND
1st	UND	Brock Boeser (27) – GW SH	unassisted	14:16	2–0 UND
1st	QUI	Tim Clifton (19) – PP	C. Clifton and St. Denis	18:53	2–1 UND
2nd	None				
3rd	UND	Drake Caggiula (24)	Schmaltz and Boeser	41:21	3–1 UND
3rd	UND	Drake Caggiula (25)	Boeser and LaDue	43:41	4–1 UND
3rd	UND	Austin Poganski (10)	Gardner and Ausmus	50:41	5–1 UND
Penalty summary
Period	Team	Player	Penalty	Time	PIM
1st	UND	Bryn Chyzyk	Slashing	09:57	2:00
1st	QUI	Travis St. Denis	Slashing	09:57	2:00
1st	UND	Paul LaDue	Tripping	13:19	2:00
1st	UND	Drake Caggiula	Cross-Checking	18:41	2:00
1st	UND	Troy Stecher	Cross-Checking	18:50	2:00
2nd	UND	Drake Caggiula	High-Sticking	22:13	2:00
2nd	UND	Christian Wolanin	Roughing	25:02	2:00
2nd	QUI	Sam Anas	Roughing	25:02	2:00
2nd	QUI	Tommy Schutt	Hooking	30:45	2:00
3rd	QUI	Derek Smith	Cross-Checking	46:36	2:00
3rd	UND	Joel Janatuinen	Roughing	57:34	2:00
3rd	QUI	Connor Clifton	Roughing	57:34	2:00

Shots by period
Team	1	2	3	T
Quinnipiac	13	9	11	33
North Dakota	16	9	11	36

Goaltenders
Team	Name	Saves	Goals against	Time on ice
QUI	Michael Garteig	31	5	60:00
UND	Cam Johnson	32	1	60:00

== Record by conference ==
Conference	# of Bids	Record	Win %	Regional Finals	Frozen Four	Championship Game	Champions
Hockey East	6	3–6	.333	2	1	-	-
NCHC	4	7–3	.700	3	2	1	1
ECAC Hockey	3	3–3	.500	1	1	1	-
WCHA	1	1–1	.500	1	-	-	-
Big Ten	1	1–1	.500	1	-	-	-
Atlantic Hockey	1	0–1	.000	-	-	-	-

== Media ==
=== Television ===
ESPN has US television rights to all games during the tournament for the twelfth consecutive year. ESPN will air every game, beginning with the regionals, on ESPN, ESPN2, ESPNews, ESPNU, or ESPN3 and will stream them online via WatchESPN.

In Canada, the tournament is broadcast by TSN and streamed on TSN Go.

==== Broadcast Assignments ====
Regionals

- Midwest Regional: Allen Bestwick & Colby Cohen – Cincinnati, Ohio
- Northeast Regional: John Buccigross, Barry Melrose & Quint Kessenich – Worcester, Massachusetts
- East Regional: Kevin Brown & Billy Jaffe – Albany, New York
- West Regional: Clay Matvick & Sean Ritchlin – St. Paul, Minnesota

Frozen Four & Championship

- John Buccigross, Barry Melrose, & Quint Kessenich – Tampa, Florida

=== Radio ===
Westwood One has exclusive radio rights to the Frozen Four and will air both the semifinals and the championship.

- Sean Grande, Cap Raeder, & Shireen Saski

== All-Tournament team ==
=== Frozen Four ===
- G: Cam Johnson (North Dakota)
- D: Troy Stecher (North Dakota)
- D: Connor Clifton (Quinnipiac)
- F: Drake Caggiula* (North Dakota)
- F: Brock Boeser (North Dakota)
- F: Travis St. Denis (Quinnipiac)

* Most Outstanding Player(s)
