= 2016 NCHC Tournament =

2016 NCHC Men's ice hockey tournament
- Dates: March 11–19, 2016
- Teams: 8
- Finals site: Target Center; Minneapolis, Minnesota
- Champions: St. Cloud State Huskies (1st title)
- Winning coach: Bob Motzko (1st title)
- MVP: Mikey Eyssimont (St. Cloud State)
- NCHC Men's Ice Hockey Tournaments

The 2016 NCHC Tournament was the third tournament in league history. It was played between March 11 and March 19, 2016. Quarterfinal games were played at home team campus sites, while the final four games were played at the Target Center in Minneapolis, Minnesota. By winning the tournament, St. Cloud State received the NCHC's automatic bid to the 2016 NCAA Division I Men's Ice Hockey Tournament.

== Format ==
The first round of the postseason tournament features a best-of-three games format. All eight conference teams participate in the tournament. Teams are seeded No. 1 through No. 8 according to their final conference standing, with a tiebreaker system used to seed teams with an identical number of points accumulated. The top four seeded teams each earn home ice and host one of the lower seeded teams.

The winners of the first round series advance to the Target Center for the NCHC Frozen Faceoff. The Frozen Faceoff uses a single-elimination format. Teams are re-seeded No. 1 through No. 4 according to the final regular season conference standings.

=== Conference standings ===
Note: GP = Games played; W = Wins; L = Losses; T = Ties; PTS = Points; GF = Goals For; GA = Goals Against

2015–16 National Collegiate Hockey Conference standings
| | Conference record | | | | | | | | Overall record | | | | | |
| | GP | W | L | T | SOW | PTS | GF | GA | GP | W | L | T | GF | GA |
|---|---|---|---|---|---|---|---|---|---|---|---|---|---|---|
| #1 North Dakota† | 24 | 19 | 4 | 1 | 1 | 59 | 89 | 49 | 44 | 34 | 6 | 4 | 162 | 81 |
| #4 St. Cloud State* | 24 | 17 | 6 | 1 | 1 | 53 | 104 | 53 | 41 | 31 | 9 | 1 | 175 | 90 |
| #6 Denver | 24 | 17 | 5 | 2 | 0 | 53 | 74 | 52 | 41 | 25 | 10 | 6 | 134 | 96 |
| #16 Minnesota–Duluth | 24 | 11 | 10 | 3 | 1 | 37 | 64 | 44 | 40 | 19 | 16 | 5 | 107 | 82 |
| Miami | 24 | 9 | 13 | 2 | 2 | 31 | 54 | 65 | 36 | 15 | 18 | 3 | 86 | 97 |
| Omaha | 24 | 8 | 15 | 1 | 0 | 25 | 60 | 83 | 36 | 18 | 17 | 1 | 103 | 107 |
| Western Michigan | 24 | 5 | 18 | 1 | 1 | 17 | 56 | 103 | 36 | 8 | 25 | 3 | 80 | 142 |
| Colorado College | 24 | 4 | 19 | 1 | 0 | 13 | 47 | 99 | 36 | 6 | 29 | 1 | 71 | 145 |
Champions: St. Cloud State † indicates conference regular season champion; * indicates conference tournament champion Rankings: USCHO.com Top 20 Poll; updated March 13, 2016

== Bracket ==
Teams are reseeded after the first round

Quarterfinals; March 11–13
1 | North Dakota | 7 | 5 | —
8 | Colorado College | 1 | 1 | —
2 | St. Cloud State | 4* | 4 | —
7 | Western Michigan | 3 | 2 | —
(Pairings are reseeded after the first round)
3 | Denver | 5 | 4** | —
6 | Omaha | 2 | 3 | —
4 | Minnesota-Duluth | 5 | 3 | —
5 | Miami | 4 | 1 | —

Semifinals; March 18
1 | North Dakota | 2
4 | Minnesota-Duluth | 4
2 | St. Cloud State | 4
3 | Denver | 2

Championship; March 19
2 | St. Cloud State | 3
4 | Minnesota-Duluth | 1
Third Place
1 | North Dakota | 1
3 | Denver | 1

* denotes overtime periods

== Results ==
All times are local.

=== Quarterfinals ===
==== (1) North Dakota vs. (8) Colorado College ====
| March 11 | North Dakota | 7 – 1 | Colorado College | Ralph Engelstad Arena | Recap |
| (Poolman, LaDue) Luke Johnson - PP - 15:27 (Dowd, Kossila) Nick Schmaltz - GW - 19:38 | | First period | No scoring |
| (Poganski, LaDue) Joel Janatuinen - PP - 16:36 | | Second period | 15:42 - PP - Tanner Ockey (Bergh, McCaskill) |
| (Wolanin, Wilkie) Coltyn Sanderson - 04:30 (Boeser, Stecher) Nick Schmaltz - PP - 13:35 (Caggiula, Schmaltz) Hayden Shaw - PP - 17:38 (Janatuinen, Sanderson) Shane Gersich - 18:32 | | Third period | No scoring |
| ( 15 saves / 16 shots ) Cam Johnson | | Goalie stats | Jacob Nehama ( 27 saves / 34 shots ) |

| March 12 | North Dakota | 5 – 1 | Colorado College | Ralph Engelstad Arena | Recap |
| (Thompson, Boeser) Nick Schmaltz - 03:55 (Simonson, Chyzyk) Joel Janatuinen - GW - 04:12 (Boeser, Schmaltz) Hayden Shaw - 13:36 (Schmaltz, Boeser) Drake Caggiula - 19:54 | | First period | No scoring |
| (Gardner, Johnson) Austin Poganski - 04:18 | | Second period | No scoring |
| No scoring | | Third period | 18:17 - Matt Hansen (Israel) |
| ( 22 saves / 23 shots ) Cam Johnson | | Goalie stats | Jacob Nehama ( 10 saves / 14 shots ) / Derek Shatzer ( 13 saves / 14 shots ) |

| North Dakota won series 2–0 |

==== (2) St. Cloud State vs. (7) Western Michigan ====
| March 11 | St. Cloud State | 4 – 3 | OT | Western Michigan | Herb Brooks National Hockey Center | Recap |
| (Schuldt, Nevalainen) Jimmy Murray - PP - 16:10 | | First period | | No scoring |
| (Benik, Murray) Will Borgen - 15:37 | | Second period | | 03:55 - Frederik Tiffels (Rebry, Dienes); 12:30 - Neal Goff (Rebry, Tiffels) |
| (Murray) Kalle Kossila - 05:03 | | Third period | | 13:55 - Colt Conrad (Novak, McKee) |
| (Schuldt, Papa) Patrick Newell - GW - 16:31 | | First overtime period | | No scoring |
| ( 27 saves / 30 shots ) Charlie Lindgren | | Goalie stats | | Lukas Hafner ( 41 saves / 45 shots ) |

| March 12 | St. Cloud State | 4 – 2 | Western Michigan | Herb Brooks National Hockey Center | Recap |
| No Scoring | | First period | 11:31 - Colt Conrad (Molino, Novak) |
| (Benson, Prow) Robby Jackson - 10:23 (unassisted) Jimmy Schuldt - 10:45 (Murray, Benik) David Morley - GW - 12:11 | | Second period | No scoring |
| (Borgen, Kossila) Patrick Russell - EN - 19:58 | | Third period | 19:50 - EA - Chris Dienes (Molino, LaPorte) |
| ( 23 saves / 25 shots ) Charlie Lindgren | | Goalie stats | Lukas Hafner ( 40 saves / 43 shots ) |

| St. Cloud State won series 2–0 |

==== (3) Denver vs. (6) Nebraska-Omaha ====
| March 11 | Denver | 5 – 2 | Nebraska-Omaha | Magness Arena | Recap |
| No Scoring | | First period | No scoring |
| (Hammond) Trevor Moore - 00:48 (Hillman, Shore) Troy Terry - PP - 02:52 (Romig, VanVoorhis) Colin Staub - GW - 03:10 | | Second period | 13:36 - PP - Jake Guentzel (Snuggerud, Ortega); 17:58 - Brian Cooper (Guentzel, Randolph) |
| (Butcher, Hammond) Danton Heinen - SH - 08:06 (unassisted) Danton Heinen - EN - 19:03 | | Third period | No scoring |
| ( 29 saves / 31 shots ) Tanner Jaillet | | Goalie stats | Kirk Thompson ( 15 saves / 19 shots ) |

| March 12 | Denver | 4 – 3 | 2OT | Nebraska-Omaha | Magness Arena | Recap |
| (Zajac, Butcher) Quentin Shore - 05:29 (Zajac, Moore) Troy Terry - 17:14 | | First period | | No scoring |
| No scoring | | Second period | | 11:17 - PP - Jake Guentzel (Ortega, Brady); 16:29 - SH - Austin Ortega (Klehr) |
| (Janssen, Jaillet) Danton Heinen - 01:31 | | Third period | | 03:57 - Austin Ortega (Guentzel, Vesel) |
| (Romig, Levin) Colin Staub - GW - 08:54 | | Second overtime period | | No scoring |
| ( 51 saves / 54 shots ) Tanner Jaillet | | Goalie stats | | Evan Weninger ( 46 saves / 50 shots ) |

| Denver won series 2–0 |

==== (4) Minnesota–Duluth vs. (5) Miami ====
| March 11 | Minnesota–Duluth | 5 – 4 | Miami | AMSOIL Arena | Recap |
| (Decowski, Sampair) Austyn Young - 04:34 | | First period | 12:17 - Zach LaValle (Morris, Greenberg) |
| (Kaskisuo) Andy Welinski - PP - 09:59 | | Second period | 04:11 - Ryan Siroky (Lemirande); 10:17 - Anthony Louis (Gacek, Melnick); 13:16 - PP - Louie Belpedio (Louis, Sherwood) |
| (Corrin, Toninato) Adam Johnson - 04:54 (Corrin, Cameranesi) Neal Pionk - PP - 11:12 (Farley, Cameranesi) Carson Soucy - GW - 12:29 | | Third period | No scoring |
| ( 18 saves / 22 shots ) Kasimir Kaskisuo | | Goalie stats | Jay Williams ( 28 saves / 33 shots ) |

| March 12 | Minnesota–Duluth | 3 – 1 | Miami | AMSOIL Arena | Recap |
| (unassisted) Kyle Osterberg - SH - 01:31 (Thomas, Iafallo) Andy Welinski - GW - 16:51 | | First period | No scoring |
| (Kuhlman, Soucy) Tony Cameranesi - SH - 12:46 | | Second period | No scoring |
| No scoring | | Third period | 17:12 - Kevin Morris (Roslovic, Louis) |
| ( 15 saves / 16 shots ) Kasimir Kaskisuo | | Goalie stats | Jay Williams ( 16 saves / 19 shots ) |

| Minnesota–Duluth won series 2–0 |

=== Semifinals ===
==== (1) North Dakota vs. (4) Minnesota–Duluth ====
| March 18 | North Dakota | 2 – 4 | Minnesota–Duluth | Target Center | Recap |
| (Caggiula, Boeser) Nick Schmaltz - 00:49 | | First period | No scoring |
| (Ausmus, Boeser) Troy Stecher - 15:00 | | Second period | 00:28 - Dominic Toninato (Raskob); 03:46 - Alex Iafallo (Raskob, Johnson); 12:24 - GW - Austin Farley (Corrin, Cameranesi) |
| No scoring | | Third period | 14:02 - Dominic Toninato (Johnson, Iafallo) |
| ( 22 saves / 26 shots ) Cam Johnson | | Goalie stats | Kasimir Kaskisuo ( 22 saves / 24 shots ) |

==== (2) St. Cloud State vs. (3) Denver ====
| March 18 | St. Cloud State | 4 – 2 | Denver | Target Center | Recap |
| (Prow, Kossila) Joey Benik - PP - 07:45 | | First period | No scoring |
| (Benik, Murray) David Morley - 11:29 | | Second period | 06:29 - Troy Terry (Hammond, Heinen) |
| (Kossila, Russell) Mikey Eyssimont - GW - 01:41 (unassisted) Jimmy Schuldt - EN - 18:43 | | Third period | 02:13 - Evan Janssen (Terry, Shore) |
| ( 17 saves / 19 shots ) Charlie Lindgren | | Goalie stats | Tanner Jaillet ( 12 saves / 15 shots ) |

=== Third place ===
==== (1) North Dakota vs. (3) Denver ====
| March 19 | North Dakota | 1 – 1 | Denver | Target Center | Recap |
| (Caggiula, Boeser) Nick Schmaltz - 06:09 | | First period | No scoring |
| No scoring | | Second period | No scoring |
| No scoring | | Third period | 13:21 - Danton Heinen (Moore, Gambrell) |
| ( 16 saves / 17 shots ) Cam Johnson | | Goalie stats | Evan Cowley ( 26 saves / 27 shots ) |

=== Championship ===
==== (2) St. Cloud State vs. (4) Minnesota–Duluth ====
| March 19 | St. Cloud State | 3 – 1 | Minnesota–Duluth | Target Center | Recap |
| No Scoring | | First period | 13:03 - Carson Soucy (Raskob, Cameranesi) |
| (Prow, Russell) Mikey Eyssimont - 08:59 (Schuldt, Kossila) Mikey Eyssimont - GW - 19:24 | | Second period | No scoring |
| (Kossila, Lizotte) Patrick Russell - 05:09 | | Third period | No scoring |
| ( 33 saves / 34 shots ) Charlie Lindgren | | Goalie stats | Kasimir Kaskisuo ( 15 saves / 18 shots ) |

== Tournament awards ==
=== Frozen Faceoff All-Tournament Team ===
- F Mikey Eyssimont* (St. Cloud State)
- F Dominic Toninato (Minnesota-Duluth)
- F Nick Schmaltz (North Dakota)
- D Ethan Prow (St. Cloud State)
- D Willie Raskob (Minnesota-Duluth)
- G Charlie Lindgren (St. Cloud State)

* Most Valuable Player(s)
