= Cam Johnson (ice hockey) =

American ice hockey player (born 1994)

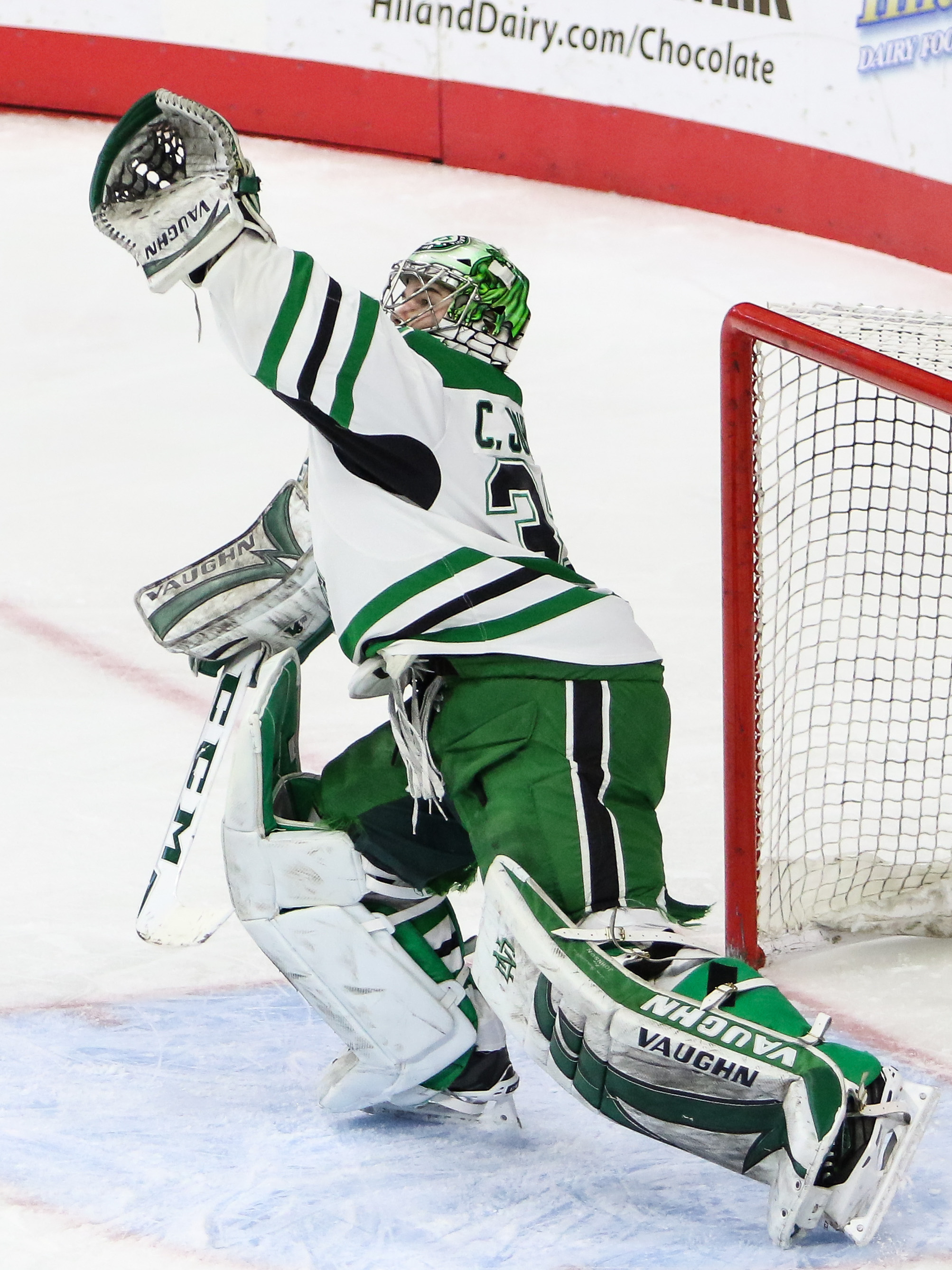
- Johnson with North Dakota in 2016
- Born: July 11, 1994 (age 32) Troy, Michigan, U.S.
- Height: 6 ft 1 in (185 cm)
- Weight: 205 lb (93 kg; 14 st 9 lb)
- Position: Goaltender
- Catches: Left
- AHL team Former teams: WBS Penguins; Binghamton Devils; Cleveland Monsters; Charlotte Checkers
- NHL draft: Undrafted
- Playing career: 2018–present

Cam Johnson (born July 11, 1994) is an American professional ice hockey goaltender for the Wilkes-Barre/Scranton Penguins of the American Hockey League (AHL). He was an All-American for North Dakota.

== Playing career ==
Johnson began attending the University of North Dakota in the fall of 2014 and served as the backup to Zane McIntyre during his freshman year. McIntyre signed professionally after the year, giving Johnson a shot at the starting job. He eventually won the position and backstopped the newly named Fighting Hawks to a first place finish. He was named an All-American for the year but faltered in the conference semifinals. Fortunately, the team's record was good enough to earn the #3 overall seed and UND went on a run through the NCAA Tournament. While the offense averaged 5 goals a game, Johnson didn't allow more than 2 goals in any of the four matches. He helped the program cruise to one of the more dominant postseason performances, winning the 8th national title in team history. He remained with UND for two more seasons, serving as the primary starter. His numbers, however, were not as strong as they had been in the championship year. The Hawks finished 4th in the NCHC both years and only played one more game in the NCAA Tournament.

After graduating, Johnson signed with the New Jersey Devils and was assigned to their minor league affiliate. His performance with Binghamton was less than impressive and he was demoted to the ECHL before his first full season was over. Johnson joined the Florida Everblades for the following season and began to acclimate to the pro game. While he only ended up playing in 7 matches during the COVID-19 season in 2021, he resigned with the Columbus Blue Jackets for the 2021–22 season.

Having claimed the Kelly Cup in the ECHL with the Florida Everblades during the 2021–22 season, Johnson left the Blue Jackets as a free agent in the off-season. On July 20, 2022, Johnson was signed to a one-year AHL contract with the Charlotte Checkers, the affiliate to the Everblades.

Johnson and the Everblades won a second Kelly Cup in the 2022–23 season, and he become the first player in ECHL history to win back-to-back Kelly Cup Most Valuable Player awards. The following season, Johnson backstopped Florida to the first three-peat in ECHL history, with Florida winning their third consecutive Kelly Cup title.

On July 30, 2024, Johnson was signed to a one-year AHL contract with the Springfield Thunderbirds, the primary affiliate to the St. Louis Blues.

After capturing his fourth ECHL Championship with the Everblades and concluding his contract with the Thunderbirds, Johnson was signed as a free agent to a one-year AHL contract with the Wilkes-Barre/Scranton Penguins on July 24, 2026.

== Career statistics ==
			Regular season									Playoffs
Season	Team	League	GP	W	L	OT	MIN	GA	SO	GAA	SV%	GP	W	L	MIN	GA	SO	GAA	SV%
2011–12	Little Caesars 18U AAA	HPHL	14	–	–	–	–	–	–	2.77	.913	—	—	—	—	—	—	—	—
2012–13	Fargo Force	USHL	28	14	8	6	1644	84	0	3.07	.909	8	4	3	475	19	1	2.40	.931
2013–14	Fargo Force	USHL	20	2	14	3	1174	64	1	3.27	.909	—	—	—	—	—	—	—	—
2013–14	Waterloo Black Hawks	USHL	15	11	1	1	840	26	1	1.86	.939	—	—	—	—	—	—	—	—
2014–15	U. of North Dakota	NCHC	2	0	0	0	43	4	0	5.54	.765	—	—	—	—	—	—	—	—
2015–16	U. of North Dakota	NCHC	34	24	4	2	1918	53	5	1.66	.935	—	—	—	—	—	—	—	—
2016–17	U. of North Dakota	NCHC	37	20	13	3	2212	88	4	2.39	.903	—	—	—	—	—	—	—	—
2017–18	U. of North Dakota	NCHC	29	12	9	7	1735	62	3	2.14	.910	—	—	—	—	—	—	—	—
2017–18	Binghamton Devils	AHL	3	0	1	2	185	12	0	3.90	.876	—	—	—	—	—	—	—	—
2018–19	Binghamton Devils	AHL	29	11	15	3	1695	107	1	3.79	.872	—	—	—	—	—	—	—	—
2018–19	Adirondack Thunder	ECHL	10	4	5	1	589	25	1	2.54	.915	—	—	—	—	—	—	—	—
2019–20	Florida Everblades	ECHL	21	13	5	1	1162	45	2	2.32	.925	—	—	—	—	—	—	—	—
2020–21	Florida Everblades	ECHL	7	6	1	0	406	12	2	1.77	.941	—	—	—	—	—	—	—	—
2021–22	Florida Everblades	ECHL	15	10	3	2	897	31	1	2.07	.913	18	15	3	1134	36	4	1.90	.931
2021–22	Cleveland Monsters	AHL	20	6	9	3	1120	61	0	3.27	.882	—	—	—	—	—	—	—	—
2022–23	Florida Everblades	ECHL	55	26	20	7	3182	151	2	2.85	.907	22	16	6	1427	50	4	2.10	.922
2022–23	Charlotte Checkers	AHL	1	1	0	0	60	3	0	3.00	.870	—	—	—	—	—	—	—	—
2023–24	Florida Everblades	ECHL	49	27	15	6	2877	106	4	2.21	.921	23	16	7	1401	44	3	1.88	.932
2024–25	Florida Everblades	ECHL	47	37	6	4	2848	91	5	1.92	.921	15	10	5	924	27	2	1.75	.922
2025–26	Florida Everblades	ECHL	49	31	9	9	2965	91	3	1.84	.923	20	16	4	1247	39	3	1.88	.923
AHL totals			53	18	25	8	3,060	183	1	3.59	.876	—	—	—	—	—	—	—	—

== Awards and honors ==
Award	Year
College
All-NCHC Second Team	2015–16
AHCA West Second Team All-American	2015–16
NCAA All-Tournament Team	2016
ECHL
June M. Kelly Award (Playoff MVP)	2022, 2023, 2026
Kelly Cup (Florida Everblades)	2022, 2023, 2024, 2026
