= Bryn Chyzyk =

Canadian ice hockey coach

- Born: November 15, 1992 (age 33) Virden, Manitoba, Canada
- Height: 6 ft 0 in (183 cm)
- Weight: 181 lb (82 kg; 12 st 13 lb)
- Position: Centre/Left wing
- Shot: Left
- Played for: Rockford IceHogs; Indy Fuel
- Playing career: 2016–2017; Coaching career

Current position
- Title: General manager/Assistant coach
- Team: North Dakota
- Conference: NCHC

Biographical details
- Education: University of North Dakota (BBA, JD)

Coaching career (HC unless noted)
- 2019–2020: North Dakota (Graduate assistant)
- 2025–present: North Dakota (General manager/Assistant coach)

Administrative career (AD unless noted)
- 2020–2021: Waterloo Black Hawks (Director of scouting)
- 2021–2025: Waterloo Black Hawks (General manager)
- 2025–present: North Dakota (General manager/Assistant coach)

Accomplishments and honors

Awards
- 2010–11 Vince Leah Trophy; 2022–23 USHL General Manager of the Year

Bryn Chyzyk (born November 15, 1992) is a Canadian general manager, coach, and former professional ice hockey forward. He is currently the general manager and an assistant coach at North Dakota.

== Playing career ==
Chyzyk played collegiate ice hockey for the University of North Dakota and was an assistant captain on the 2015–16 team that captured North Dakota's 8th national title. Following his time at UND, Chyzyk split one professional season playing for the Rockford IceHogs and Indy Fuel in the AHL and ECHL respectively before his career was cut short by injury.

== Coaching and administrative career ==
Following his professional career, Chyzyk returned to the University of North Dakota to attend law school and served as a graduate assistant for the men's hockey team during the 2019–20 season. He joined the Waterloo Black Hawks in 2020 after obtaining his JD, serving as director of scouting for one year before being named the team's general manager in 2021. In 2025, he returned to his alma mater once again to serve on the staff of Dane Jackson as the first general manager in NCAA ice hockey history to also serve as an assistant coach.

== Career statistics ==
			Regular season					Playoffs
Season	Team	League	GP	G	A	Pts	PIM	GP	G	A	Pts	PIM
2009–10	Dauphin Kings	MJHL	1	0	0	0	0	—	—	—	—	—
2010–11	Dauphin Kings	MJHL	62	22	49	71	26	13	1	6	7	14
2011–12	Fargo Force	USHL	57	28	21	49	107	6	0	1	1	6
2012–13	North Dakota	WCHA	13	1	2	3	10	—	—	—	—	—
2013–14	North Dakota	NCHC	37	4	5	9	10	—	—	—	—	—
2014-15	North Dakota	NCHC	36	7	6	13	14	—	—	—	—	—
2015-16	North Dakota	NCHC	42	12	10	22	12	—	—	—	—	—
2016-17	Rockford IceHogs	AHL	2	0	0	0	0	—	—	—	—	—
2016-17	Indy Fuel	ECHL	30	5	7	12	12	—	—	—	—	—
NCAA totals			128	24	23	47	46	—	—	—	—	—

== Awards and honors ==
Award	Year	Ref.
Vince Leah Trophy (MJHL Rookie of the Year)	2010–11	
USHL General Manager of the Year	2022–23	
