= Rhett Gardner =

Canadian ice hockey player (born 1996)

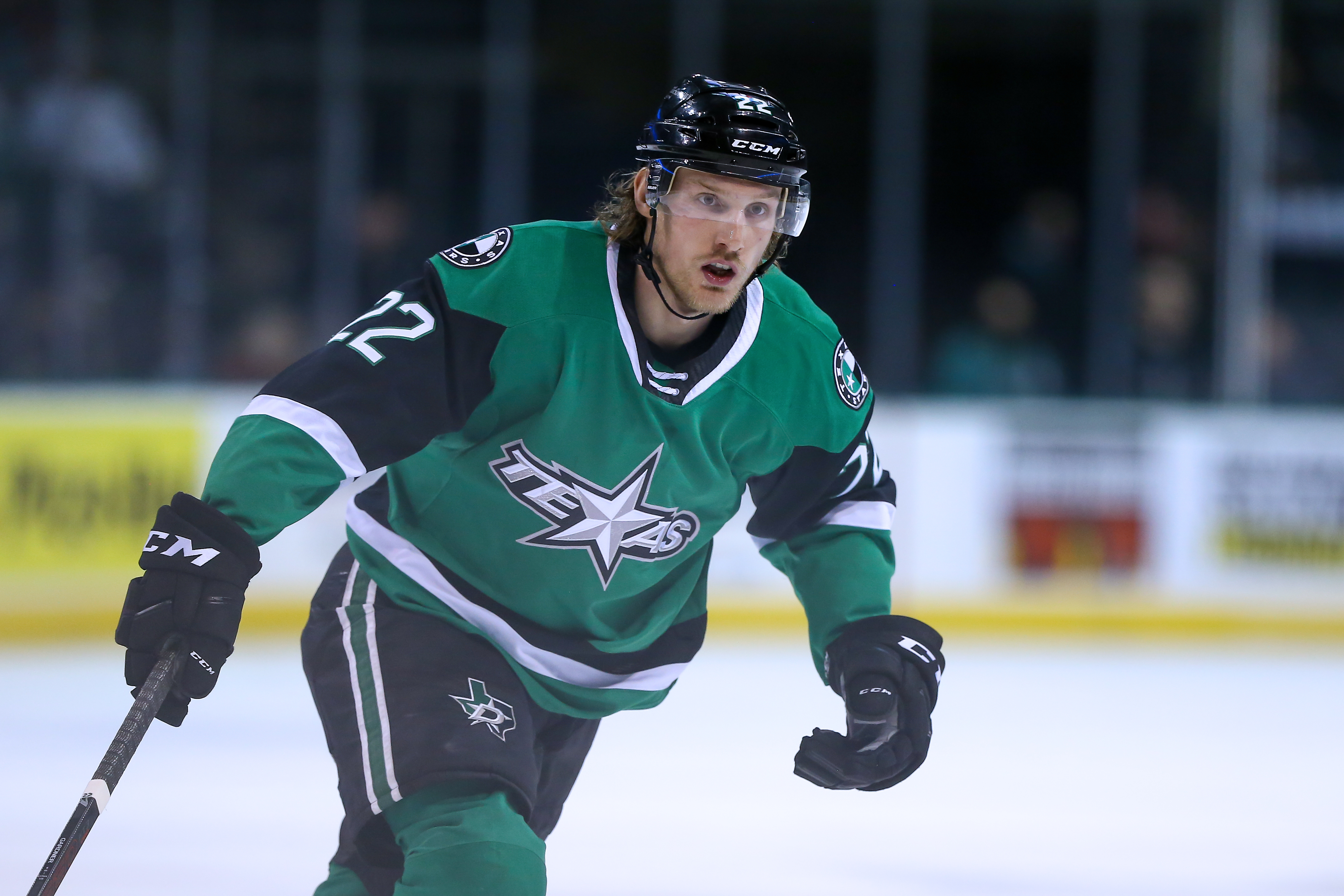
- Born: February 28, 1996 (age 30) Moose Jaw, Saskatchewan, Canada
- Height: 6 ft 3 in (191 cm)
- Weight: 220 lb (100 kg; 15 st 10 lb)
- Position: Centre
- Shoots: Left
- KHL team Former teams: Dinamo Minsk; Dallas Stars; Philadelphia Flyers; CSKA Moscow
- NHL draft: 116th overall, 2016; Dallas Stars
- Playing career: 2018–present

Rhett Gardner (born February 28, 1996) is a Canadian professional ice hockey forward currently playing for HC Dinamo Minsk (KHL). He previously played in the National Hockey League (NHL) for the Dallas Stars and Philadelphia Flyers, and CSKA Moscow of the KHL.

== Early life ==
Gardner was born on February 28, 1996, in Moose Jaw, Saskatchewan, Canada to parents Rob and Renee Gardner.

== Playing career ==
Born and raised in Saskatchewan, Gardner was drafted in the second round of the 2011 Western Hockey League (WHL) Bantam Draft by the Spokane Chiefs while captaining the Moose Jaw Generals. However, he never played for the team as his rights were traded to Brandon Wheat Kings on January 10. Following the trade, Gardner informed the Wheat Kings he would not report to them as he had committed to play NCAA Division I collegiate ice hockey with the North Dakota Fighting Hawks men's ice hockey team. While attending Vanier Collegiate Institute, Gardner played with the Okotoks Oilers of the Alberta Junior Hockey League. During the 2013–14 season, he earned AJHL All-Rookie Team honors after recording 13 goals and 24 assists in 52 games. As a result of his play, he was selected to represent Team Canada at the World Junior A Challenge, winning a bronze medal in 2013.

=== Collegiate ===
Gardner joined the North Dakota Fighting Hawks as a freshman for their 2015–16 season, where he helped them win their first NCAA Championship title in 16 years. During the season, he tied for fourth on the team with 11 goals which also ranked second-most among freshmen. He also won 280 faceoffs, which was the second-most in program history. In January 2016, Gardner was named National Collegiate Hockey Conference (NCHC) Rookie of the Week after scored four goals over two games. As he helped the team clinch their NCAA title, Gardner became the first former Okotoks Oiler player to win a national title. He finished his rookie campaign being named to the NCHC's 2015–16 Academic All-Conference Freshman Team.

Prior to his sophomore season, Gardner was drafted in the fourth round, 116th overall, by the Dallas Stars in the 2016 NHL entry draft. He returned to the Fighting Hawks for their 2016–17 season where he set a new career high in points, assists, and power-play goals. At the conclusion of the season, Gardner was again selected for the NCHC Academic All-Conference Team. On April 11, 2017, Gardner was named an assistant captain alongside Trevor Olson and Johnny Simonson for the 2017–18 season.

=== Professional ===
On March 19, 2019, having concluded his collegiate career, Gardner was signed to a two-year, entry-level contract with the Dallas Stars. He was subsequently assigned to the Stars' American Hockey League (AHL) affiliate, the Texas Stars, for the remainder of their 2018–19 season. Gardner recorded his first professional assist on Colin Markison’s game-winning goal during a 5–2 win over the Iowa Wild on March 29, 2019.

Gardner was invited to participate in the Dallas Stars' 2019 training camp prior to the start of the 2019–20 season but was re-assigned to the AHL on September 17. He was re-called to the NHL on October 4 prior the Texas Stars' opening night. Gardner made his NHL debut on October 5 against the St. Louis Blues, logging four faceoff wins and one hit in 12:04 time on ice. He played in six more games for Dallas, posting eight shots on goal and seven hits, before being re-assigned to the AHL.

Upon joining the Dallas Stars, he records his first career NHL assist in a 2–1 shootout win over the Columbus Blue Jackets on March 14. His point, an assist, came off a goal from Joe Pavelski who had redirected Joel Kiviranta's shot on goal. A few games later, on March 21, 2021, Gardner scored his first NHL goal in a game against the Nashville Predators.

On June 24, 2021, Gardner was signed to a two-year, $1.5 million contract extension with the Stars. The deal is two-way for the 2021–22 season and one-way for 2022–23 season.

On July 1, 2023, Gardner left the Stars organization as a free agent in signing a two-year, two-way contract with the Philadelphia Flyers.

After two seasons in the Flyers organization, Gardner left North America to sign a two-year contract with HC CSKA Moscow of the Kontinental Hockey League on July 8, 2025.

== Career statistics ==
=== Regular season and playoffs ===
			Regular season					Playoffs
Season	Team	League	GP	G	A	Pts	PIM	GP	G	A	Pts	PIM
2010–11	Moose Jaw Generals	SMHL	10	2	3	5	12	2	0	0	0	0
2011–12	Moose Jaw Generals	SMHL	41	19	11	30	53	9	4	2	6	2
2012–13	Moose Jaw Generals	SMHL	35	27	21	48	24	2	1	0	1	2
2012–13	Green Bay Gamblers	USHL	1	0	0	0	0	—	—	—	—	—
2013–14	Okotoks Oilers	AJHL	52	13	24	37	82	5	1	1	2	6
2014–15	Okotoks Oilers	AJHL	54	24	30	54	119	7	1	5	6	14
2015–16	U. of North Dakota	NCHC	41	11	7	18	52	—	—	—	—	—
2016–17	U. of North Dakota	NCHC	38	8	13	21	69	—	—	—	—	—
2017–18	U. of North Dakota	NCHC	33	7	13	20	48	—	—	—	—	—
2018–19	U. of North Dakota	NCHC	37	8	7	15	71	—	—	—	—	—
2018–19	Texas Stars	AHL	11	4	1	5	4	—	—	—	—	—
2019–20	Dallas Stars	NHL	8	0	0	0	2	—	—	—	—	—
2019–20	Texas Stars	AHL	55	9	15	24	36	—	—	—	—	—
2020–21	Dallas Stars	NHL	28	1	1	2	8	—	—	—	—	—
2020–21	Texas Stars	AHL	2	0	0	0	4	—	—	—	—	—
2021–22	Texas Stars	AHL	66	7	9	16	69	2	0	0	0	0
2021–22	Dallas Stars	NHL	4	0	0	0	0	—	—	—	—	—
2022–23	Texas Stars	AHL	71	10	30	40	75	8	4	4	8	22
2023–24	Lehigh Valley Phantoms	AHL	60	10	13	23	89	6	2	1	3	14
2023–24	Philadelphia Flyers	NHL	1	0	0	0	0	—	—	—	—	—
2024–25	Lehigh Valley Phantoms	AHL	62	5	13	18	59	3	0	0	0	2
2025–26	CSKA Moscow	KHL	65	1	9	10	23	9	0	1	1	0
NHL totals			41	1	1	2	10	—	—	—	—	—
KHL totals			65	1	9	10	23	9	0	1	1	0

=== International ===
Year	Team	Event	Result	GP	G	A	Pts	PIM
2013	Canada Western	U17	9th	5	2	0	2	2
Junior totals				5	2	0	2	2

== Awards and honours ==
Award	Year
SMHL
Second All-Star Team	2013
AJHL
South All-Rookie Team	2014
College
NCHC Best Defensive Forward	2018

Awards and achievements
Preceded by Dominic Toninato	NCHC Defensive Forward of the Year; 2017–18	Succeeded by Justin Richards
