= Luke Johnson (ice hockey) =

American ice hockey player (born 1994)

- Born: September 19, 1994 (age 32) Grand Forks, North Dakota, U.S.
- Height: 5 ft 11 in (180 cm)
- Weight: 179 lb (81 kg; 12 st 11 lb)
- Position: Center
- Shoots: Right
- KHL team Former teams: Metallurg Magnitogorsk; Chicago Blackhawks; Minnesota Wild
- NHL draft: 134th overall, 2013; Chicago Blackhawks
- Playing career: 2016–present

Luke Johnson (born September 19, 1994) is an American ice hockey center who is currently playing for Metallurg Magnitogorsk in the Kontinental Hockey League (KHL). Johnson was selected in the fifth round, 134th overall by the Chicago Blackhawks in the 2013 NHL entry draft. With Metallurg Magnitogorsk, Johnson won the KHL's Gagarin Cup championship in 2024.

Prior to turning professional, Johnson played NCAA Division I hockey for the University of North Dakota. In his junior year, he helped North Dakota win the 2016 National Championship.

== Playing career ==
=== Amateur ===
While playing with the Lincoln Stars of the United States Hockey League, Johnson committed to the University of North Dakota.

Johnson began his freshman season at the University of North Dakota during the 2013–14 season. He played in 42 games and led the team's rookies in goals with eight. Johnson scored his first goal as a Fighting Sioux on November 9 in a 4–2 loss to Nebraska Omaha. After recording six points in four games, Johnson was named NCHC Rookie of the Month for December. Johnson helped guide the team to the 2013 NCAA Midwest Region semifinal where they lost in the Regional final to Yale.

In his sophomore year, Johnson recorded a new career high 24 points and 11 goals during his 42 game campaign. He participated in the 2015 Frozen Four and was named to the NCAA West Region All-Tournament Team.

In his junior year, Johnson played in 43 games for the Fighting Sioux and matched his career high in goals. The Fighting Sioux again participated in the 2016 Frozen Four tournament but Johnson was injured in the second period of the semi-finals against Denver and was forced to miss the National Championship game against Quinnipiac. This was the only game he missed in his 127 game career with the Fighting Hawks. Nonetheless, the Fighting Sioux beat Quinnipiac 5–1, winning the National Championship. Johnson was again named to the NCAA Midwest Region All-Tournament Team and later signed a three-year entry-level contract with the Chicago Blackhawks on April 29, 2016.

=== Professional ===
In his rookie season with the Rockford IceHogs, Johnson recorded 17 points in 73 games and was named the IceHog's Rookie of the Year. In his second year with the team, he had an uptake in scoring which he attributes to changing his eating habits and focusing on his nutrition. He ended his second season with 30 points in 73 games.

After playing two years with the Rockford IceHogs, Johnson made the Blackhawks 2018–19 opening night roster. He subsequently made his NHL debut on October 4, against the Ottawa Senators. Johnson was reassigned to the AHL on October 18 after playing in three games. With the IceHogs, Johnson increased his scoring rate, improving his points totals with 18 goals and 31 points in 53 games. At the conclusion of the season, Johnson finishing his first season in the NHL registering 1 assist in 15 games.

As an impending restricted free agent, Johnson was not tendered a qualifying offer by the Blackhawks, releasing him as a free agent on June 25, 2019. On the opening day of free agency, Johnson agreed to a two-year, two-way contract with the Minnesota Wild on July 1, 2019.

On July 28, 2021, as a free agent from the Wild, Johnson was signed to a one-year, two-way contract with the Winnipeg Jets. In the 2021–22 season, Johnson was assigned by the Jets to play exclusively with AHL affiliate, the Manitoba Moose, collecting 10 points through just 23 regular season games.

On August 10, 2022, having left the Jets as a free agent, Johnson continued his career in the AHL by agreeing to a one-year contract with the San Jose Barracuda.

At the conclusion of his contract with the Barracuda, Johnson left North America and signed his first contract abroad in agreeing to a one-year deal with Russian club, Metallurg Magnitogorsk of the KHL on July 26, 2023. He won the Gagarin Cup at the end of the season.

== Personal life ==
Johnson comes from a hockey playing family; both his father, uncle, and cousin played collegiate hockey for the University of North Dakota. Johnson's father Steve played for the University of North Dakota from 1984 to 1988 where he was named a Hobey Baker Award finalist. His cousin Paul LaDue currently plays for Modo Hockey of the Swedish Hockey League, and his younger brother was drafted by the Lincoln Stars in the 2016 USHL draft.

== Career statistics ==
			Regular season					Playoffs
Season	Team	League	GP	G	A	Pts	PIM	GP	G	A	Pts	PIM
2009–10	Grand Forks Central High	USHS	27	17	29	46	30	—	—	—	—	—
2010–11	Grand Forks Central High	USHS	25	17	25	42	43	—	—	—	—	—
2011–12	Lincoln Stars	USHL	55	20	35	55	52	8	1	1	2	2
2012–13	Lincoln Stars	USHL	57	19	27	46	32	5	0	0	0	0
2013–14	U. of North Dakota	NCHC	42	8	13	21	26	—	—	—	—	—
2014–15	U. of North Dakota	NCHC	42	11	13	24	54	—	—	—	—	—
2015–16	U. of North Dakota	NCHC	43	11	10	21	45	—	—	—	—	—
2016–17	Rockford IceHogs	AHL	73	8	9	17	31	—	—	—	—	—
2017–18	Rockford IceHogs	AHL	73	13	17	30	62	13	4	4	8	6
2018–19	Chicago Blackhawks	NHL	15	0	1	1	8	—	—	—	—	—
2018–19	Rockford IceHogs	AHL	53	18	13	31	34	—	—	—	—	—
2019–20	Iowa Wild	AHL	42	18	13	31	43	—	—	—	—	—
2019–20	Minnesota Wild	NHL	3	0	0	0	0	—	—	—	—	—
2020–21	Minnesota Wild	NHL	14	1	0	1	5	—	—	—	—	—
2020–21	Iowa Wild	AHL	2	0	1	1	5	—	—	—	—	—
2021–22	Manitoba Moose	AHL	23	3	7	10	33	4	2	2	4	2
2022–23	San Jose Barracuda	AHL	67	10	8	18	55	—	—	—	—	—
2023–24	Metallurg Magnitogorsk	KHL	64	12	10	22	18	23	4	3	7	7
2024–25	Metallurg Magnitogorsk	KHL	64	12	14	26	26	6	1	2	3	7
2025–26	Metallurg Magnitogorsk	KHL	39	10	7	17	26	15	1	4	5	13
NHL totals			32	1	1	2	13	—	—	—	—	—
KHL totals			167	34	31	65	70	44	6	9	15	27

== Awards and honors ==
Award	Year
KHL
Gagarin Cup (Metallurg Magnitogorsk)	2024
