= Paul LaDue =

American ice hockey player

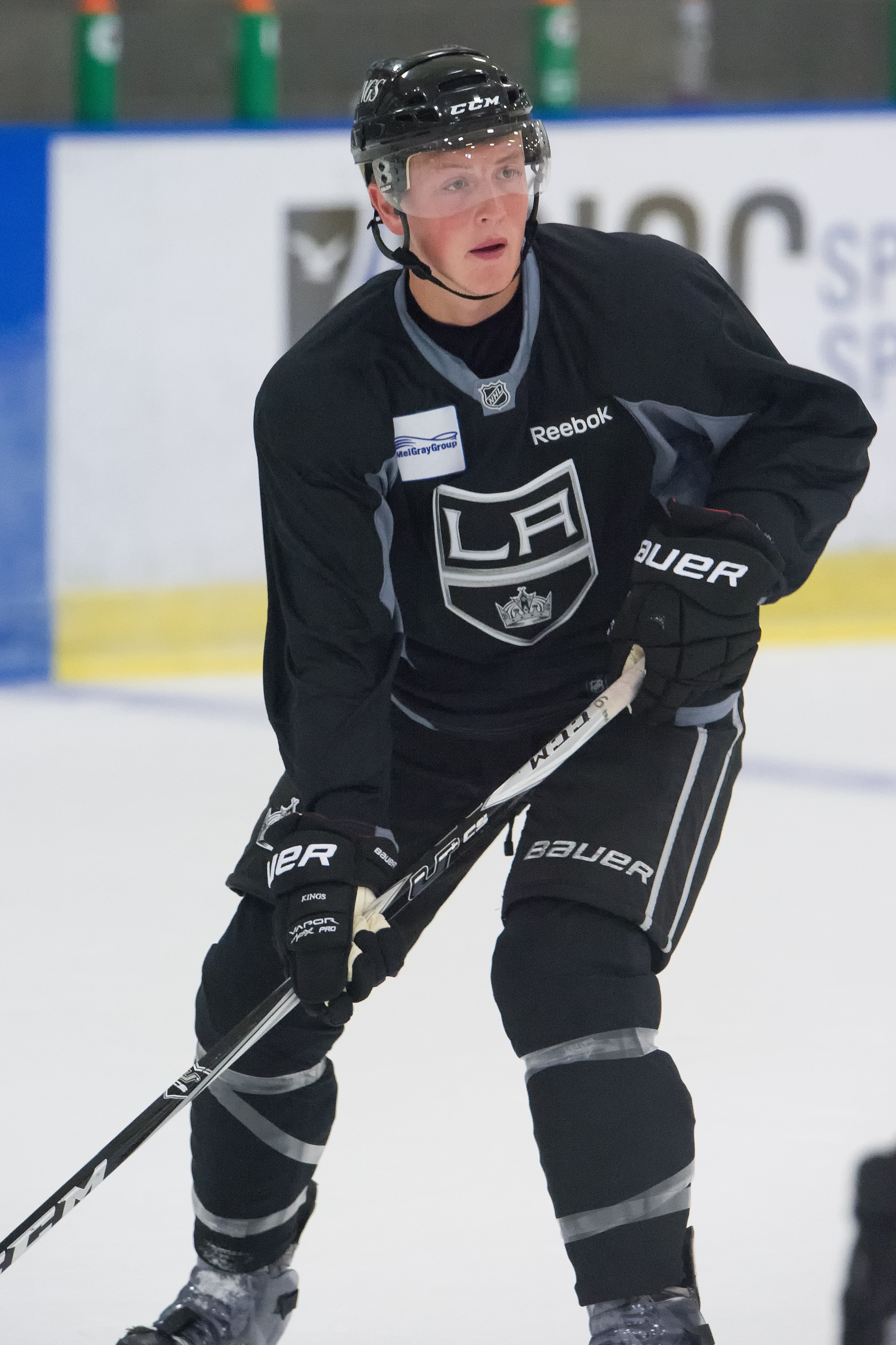
- LaDue with the Los Angeles Kings in 2012
- Born: September 6, 1992 (age 33) Grand Forks, North Dakota, U.S.
- Height: 6 ft 3 in (191 cm)
- Weight: 205 lb (93 kg; 14 st 9 lb)
- Position: Defense
- Shoots: Right
- SHL team Former teams: Rögle BK; Los Angeles Kings; New York Islanders; Modo Hockey
- NHL draft: 181st overall, 2012; Los Angeles Kings
- Playing career: 2016–present

Paul LaDue (born September 6, 1992) is an American professional ice hockey defenseman for Rögle BK of the Swedish Hockey League (SHL). He was drafted by the Los Angeles Kings in the sixth round, 181st overall, in the 2012 NHL entry draft.

== Playing career ==
LaDue played junior hockey with the Alexandria Blizzard of the North American Hockey League and the Lincoln Stars in the United States Hockey League before he was drafted by the Kings. Committing to a collegiate career, LaDue returned home to North Dakota to play with the University of North Dakota in the National Collegiate Hockey Conference.

Upon the conclusion of a successful junior year in 2015–16 season, helping the Fighting Hawks claim the National Championship, LaDue embarked on his professional career in agreeing to a one-year, entry-level contract with the Los Angeles Kings on April 30, 2016. He made his professional debut in joining AHL affiliate, the Ontario Reign, on an amateur try-out and appeared in 3 post-season games.

After attending his first training camp with the Kings and turning heads in the pre-season, LaDue began his rookie campaign re-assigned to the Reign to begin the 2016–17 season. While placing second amongst blueliners in scoring, LaDue received his first recall to the NHL on February 1, 2017. He made his NHL debut with the Kings in a 5–0 shutout defeat to the Tampa Bay Lightning on February 7, 2017. He recorded his first point, an assist on a goal to Dwight King, in his second contest, a 6–3 victory over the Florida Panthers on February 9, 2017.

On October 10, 2020, LaDue was signed as a free agent to a one-year, two-way contract with the Washington Capitals. On September 20, 2021, LaDue was signed to a one-year contract by the New York Islanders.

Following three seasons within the Islanders organization, LaDue left the club as a free agent and opted to sign his first contract abroad in agreeing to terms on a one-year contract with Swedish club, MoDo Hockey of the Swedish Hockey League (SHL), on July 16, 2024. In the 2024–25 season, LaDue made 50 appearances from the blueline with MoDo, registering 5 goals and 17 points. He was unable to help MoDo starve off relegation to the Allsvenskan, going scoreless through 6 play-out games.

As a free agent, LaDue continued his career in the SHL signing a one-year contract for the 2025–26 season with Rögle BK, on June 16, 2025.

== Personal life ==
LaDue comes from a hockey playing family; his uncles and cousin also played collegiate hockey for the University of North Dakota. His cousin Luke Johnson played in the NHL, and currently plays professionally for Metallurg Magnitogorsk of the KHL.

== Career statistics ==
			Regular season					Playoffs
Season	Team	League	GP	G	A	Pts	PIM	GP	G	A	Pts	PIM
2009–10	Great Plains	USHS	19	2	4	6	6	—	—	—	—	—
2009–10	Grand Forks Central High	USHS	27	10	25	35	18	—	—	—	—	—
2010–11	Alexandria Blizzard	NAHL	56	3	19	22	58	3	0	2	2	2
2011–12	Lincoln Stars	USHL	56	9	25	34	27	8	1	2	3	2
2012–13	Lincoln Stars	USHL	62	12	37	49	20	5	1	1	2	0
2013–14	U. of North Dakota	NCHC	41	6	15	21	23	—	—	—	—	—
2014–15	U. of North Dakota	NCHC	41	5	17	22	31	—	—	—	—	—
2015–16	U. of North Dakota	NCHC	41	5	14	19	14	—	—	—	—	—
2015–16	Ontario Reign	AHL	—	—	—	—	—	3	0	0	0	2
2016–17	Ontario Reign	AHL	38	6	12	18	28	3	1	0	1	2
2016–17	Los Angeles Kings	NHL	22	0	8	8	4	—	—	—	—	—
2017–18	Ontario Reign	AHL	36	8	10	18	22	4	0	0	0	6
2017–18	Los Angeles Kings	NHL	12	3	1	4	6	2	1	0	1	0
2018–19	Los Angeles Kings	NHL	33	2	3	5	12	—	—	—	—	—
2019–20	Ontario Reign	AHL	48	9	18	27	30	—	—	—	—	—
2019–20	Los Angeles Kings	NHL	2	0	1	1	0	—	—	—	—	—
2020–21	Hershey Bears	AHL	18	3	5	8	18	—	—	—	—	—
2021–22	Bridgeport Islanders	AHL	60	4	8	12	26	6	0	1	1	6
2021–22	New York Islanders	NHL	1	0	0	0	0	—	—	—	—	—
2022–23	Bridgeport Islanders	AHL	49	0	8	8	33	—	—	—	—	—
2023–24	Bridgeport Islanders	AHL	44	0	8	8	33	—	—	—	—	—
2024–25	MoDo Hockey	SHL	50	5	12	17	24	—	—	—	—	—
NHL totals			70	5	13	18	22	2	1	0	1	0

== Awards and honours ==
Award	Year	Ref
NAHL
All-Rookie Second Team	2011	
USHL
First All-Star Team	2013	
College
NCHC All-Rookie Team	2014	
