= Kasimir Kaskisuo =

Finnish ice hockey player (born 1993)

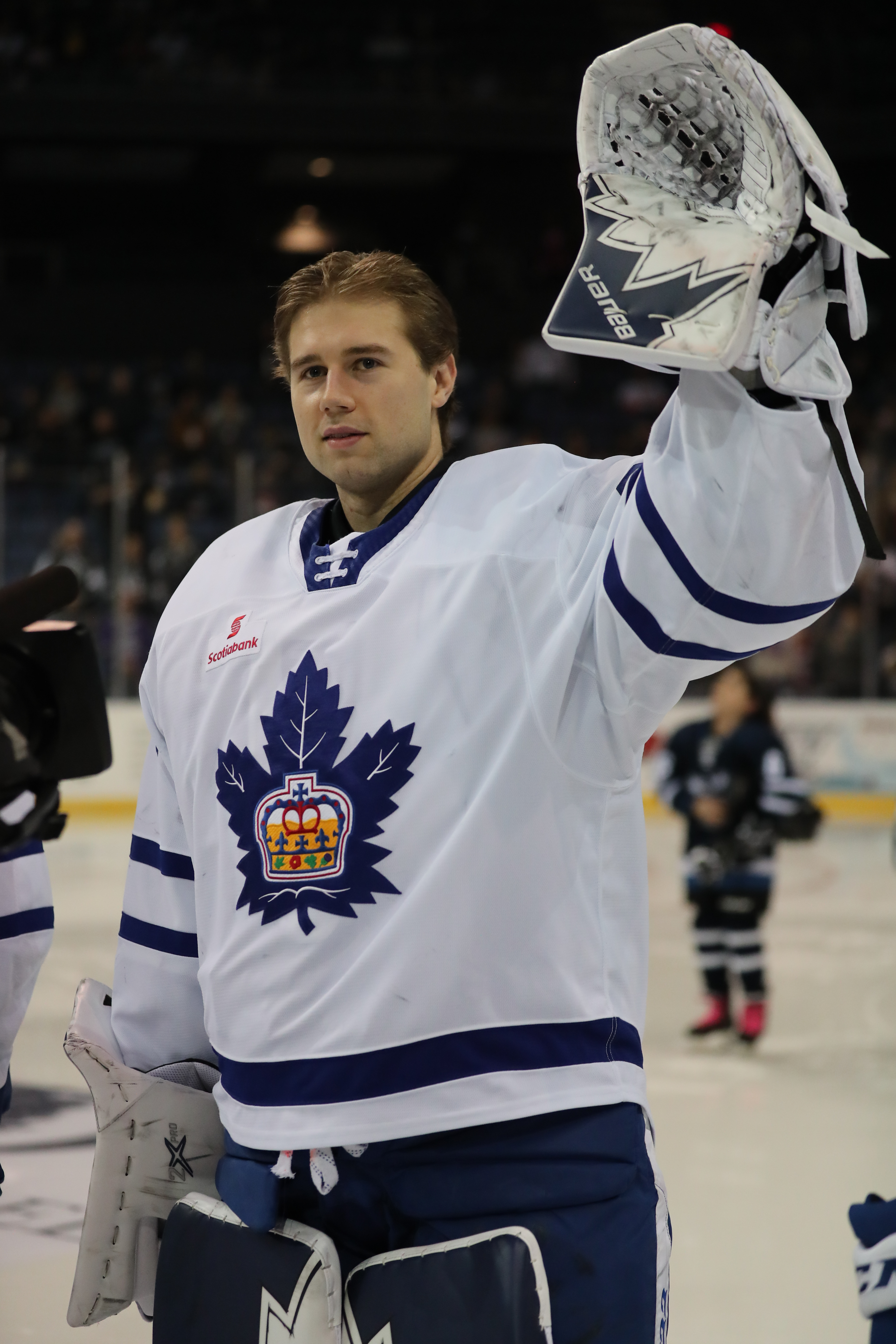
- Kaskisuo with the Toronto Marlies in 2020
- Born: 2 October 1993 (age 33) Vantaa, Finland
- Height: 6 ft 3 in (191 cm)
- Weight: 203 lb (92 kg; 14 st 7 lb)
- Position: Goaltender
- Catches: Left
- ECHL team Former teams: Wheeling Nailers; Toronto Maple Leafs; Nashville Predators; Leksands IF
- NHL draft: Undrafted
- Playing career: 2016–present

Kasimir Kaskisuo (born 2 October 1993) is a Finnish professional ice hockey player who is a goaltender for the Wheeling Nailers of the ECHL. Originally undrafted by teams in the National Hockey League (NHL), he has previously played for the Toronto Maple Leafs and Nashville Predators.

== Playing career ==
=== Collegiate ===
While playing with the Minnesota Wilderness in the North American Hockey League (NAHL), Kaskisuo committed to play collegiate hockey with the University of Minnesota–Duluth of the National Collegiate Athletic Association (NCAA). In his freshman year, Kaskisuo recorded a .923 save percentage to earn National Collegiate Hockey Conference (NCHC) Rookie of the Week honors. He later went 5–0–0 with a .949 save percentage to earn the Bauer NCHC Goalie of the Week. By the end of the month, he was named Hockey Commissioners' Association Rookie of the Month for November. At the conclusion of the 2014–15 season, Kaskisuo was named to the All-Rookie Team, and a finalist for Goaltender of the Year. He was also elected the University of Minnesota–Duluth's Most Valuable Player for the 2014–15 season.

Prior to his sophomore season, Kaskisuo was named to the Mike Richter Award Watch List for the 2015–16 season. At the conclusion of the season, Kaskisuo was chosen for the American Sports Network Player of the Week after making a career-high 49 saves in a game against St. Cloud State. He was also named a finalist for the Mike Richter Award as the most outstanding in NCAA Division I men's ice hockey.

=== Professional ===
On 28 March 2016, Kaskisuo signed a two-way contract with the Toronto Maple Leafs, and began play with its minor league affiliates, the Toronto Marlies of the American Hockey League (AHL) and the Orlando Solar Bears of the ECHL. On 29 May 2018, the Maple Leafs signed Kaskisuo to another two-way contract that lasted two years. During the 2017–18 season, the Maple Leafs loaned Kaskisuo to the AHL's Chicago Wolves.

On 12 November 2019, the Maple Leafs called-up Kaskisuo to serve as their backup goaltender. On 16 November 2019, he made his NHL debut in a 6–1 road loss versus the Pittsburgh Penguins.

In the summer of 2020, the Maple Leafs hosted one of the two "bubbles" where the NHL held the 2020 Stanley Cup playoffs. Each team had to choose a third goaltender in case of emergency, and the Maple Leafs chose Kaskisuo.

On 13 October 2020, after five seasons with the Maple Leafs organization, Kaskisuo signed a one-year, two-way contract with the Nashville Predators as a free agent.

Following his sixth professional season within North America, Kaskisuo opted to return to Europe as a free agent, agreeing to a two-year contract with Swedish Hockey League (SHL) club, Leksands IF, on 4 June 2021. Having made 64 combined SHL and Champions League appearances for 30 wins, Kaskisuo left the club as at the conclusion of his two-year tenure on 21 March 2023.

On 18 December 2023, Kaskisuo returned to North America under a professional tryout (PTO) with the Laval Rocket of the American Hockey League (AHL). On 19 February 2024, Kaskisuo signed a standard player contract to remain with Laval until the end of the 2023–24 season.

In June 2024, Kaskisuo announced via his YouTube channel that he would not be returning to the Canadiens organization for the 2024–25 season.

On 19 September 2024, Kaskisuo signed a PTO with the Boston Bruins. The Bruins released Kaskisuo from his PTO on 29 September 2024.

On 4 January 2025, Kaskisuo signed with the Norfolk Admirals of the ECHL. After appearing in 2 games with the Admirals, Kaskisuo was placed on 14 day IR before ultimately being released.

On 14 February 2025, Kaskisuo signed with the Bloomington Bison of the ECHL.

On 8 December 2025, Kaskisuo signed a one-year contract with the ECHL's Utah Grizzlies for the remainder of the 2025–26 season.

On 22 December 2025, Kaskisuo signed a one-year contract with Mestis' Kiekko-Pojat for the remainder of the 2025–26 season, with an option for the 2026–27 season.

== Personal life ==
Kasimir Kaskisuo

YouTube information
- Channel: Kasimir Kaskisuo
- Years active: 2020–present
- Subscribers: 74.3 thousand
- Views: 4.3 million
- Last updated: 14 March, 2026

Kaskisuo met his wife Whitney while in college. The couple has one daughter together. Kaskisuo also runs a YouTube channel in which he discusses life as a professional hockey player. As of March 2026, his channel has 74,300 active subscribers and over 4 million combined views.

== Career statistics ==
			Regular season									Playoffs
Season	Team	League	GP	W	L	T/OT	MIN	GA	SO	GAA	SV%	GP	W	L	MIN	GA	SO	GAA	SV%
2010–11	Jokerit	Jr. A	6	—	—	—	358	—	—	2.51	.920	2	—	—	—	—	—	2.43	.919
2011–12	Jokerit	Jr. A	9	5	1	0	424	20	0	2.82	.888	—	—	—	—	—	—	—	—
2011–12	BeWe TuusKi	2.Div	2	—	—	—	120	5	0	2.50	.915	—	—	—	—	—	—	—	—
2012–13	Jokerit	Jr. A	13	—	—	—	751	34	1	2.72	.905	—	—	—	—	—	—	—	—
2013–14	Minnesota Wilderness	NAHL	32	21	6	5	1,951	48	9	1.48	.944	5	2	2	274	8	1	1.75	.943
2014–15	U. of Minnesota–Duluth	NCHC	36	18	14	3	2,114	81	1	2.30	.917	—	—	—	—	—	—	—	—
2015–16	U. of Minnesota–Duluth	NCHC	39	19	15	5	2,350	75	5	1.92	.923	—	—	—	—	—	—	—	—
2015–16	Toronto Marlies	AHL	2	1	0	1	125	5	0	2.40	.906	—	—	—	—	—	—	—	—
2016–17	Orlando Solar Bears	ECHL	32	14	11	2	1,842	106	1	3.45	.899	—	—	—	—	—	—	—	—
2016–17	Toronto Marlies	AHL	7	5	1	0	391	12	1	1.84	.934	10	5	3	564	25	0	2.66	.892
2017–18	Toronto Marlies	AHL	1	1	0	0	60	1	0	1.00	.963	—	—	—	—	—	—	—	—
2017–18	Orlando Solar Bears	ECHL	2	1	1	0	123	8	0	3.91	.884	—	—	—	—	—	—	—	—
2017–18	Chicago Wolves	AHL	28	13	13	2	1,613	64	2	2.38	.914	—	—	—	—	—	—	—	—
2018–19	Toronto Marlies	AHL	30	12	9	5	1,624	83	4	3.07	.896	12	9	3	730	26	1	2.14	.927
2019–20	Toronto Marlies	AHL	27	14	9	2	1,529	71	1	2.79	.909	—	—	—	—	—	—	—	—
2019–20	Toronto Maple Leafs	NHL	1	0	1	0	60	6	0	6.00	.842	—	—	—	—	—	—	—	—
2020–21	Nashville Predators	NHL	1	0	0	0	15	0	0	0.00	1.000	—	—	—	—	—	—	—	—
2021–22	Leksands IF	SHL	46	23	22	0	2,730	120	2	2.64	.910	3	1	2	175	7	0	2.39	.911
2022–23	Leksands IF	SHL	14	3	9	0	728	40	0	3.30	.879	—	—	—	—	—	—	—	—
2023–24	Laval Rocket	AHL	13	7	4	0	683	33	0	2.90	.909	—	—	—	—	—	—	—	—
2024–25	Norfolk Admirals	ECHL	2	0	2	0	119	7	0	3.53	.873	—	—	—	—	—	—	—	—
2024–25	Bloomington Bison	ECHL	10	3	4	2	527	29	0	3.30	.911	—	—	—	—	—	—	—	—
2025–26	JoKP	Mestis	15	2	9	4	864	41	0	2.85	.884	—	—	—	—	—	—	—	—
2025–26	Utah Grizzlies	ECHL	1	1	0	0	60	0	1	0.00	1.000	—	—	—	—	—	—	—	—
NHL totals			2	0	1	0	75	6	0	4.78	.854	—	—	—	—	—	—	—	—
SHL totals			60	26	31	0	3,458	160	2	2.78	.904	3	1	2	175	7	0	2.39	.911

== Awards and honors ==
Award	Year	Ref
NAHL
All-Midwest Division Team	2014	
College
NCHC All-Rookie Team	2015	
NCHC Honorable Mention All-Star Team	2016	
AHL
All-Star Classic	2020	
