= Austin Poganski =

American ice hockey player (born 1996)

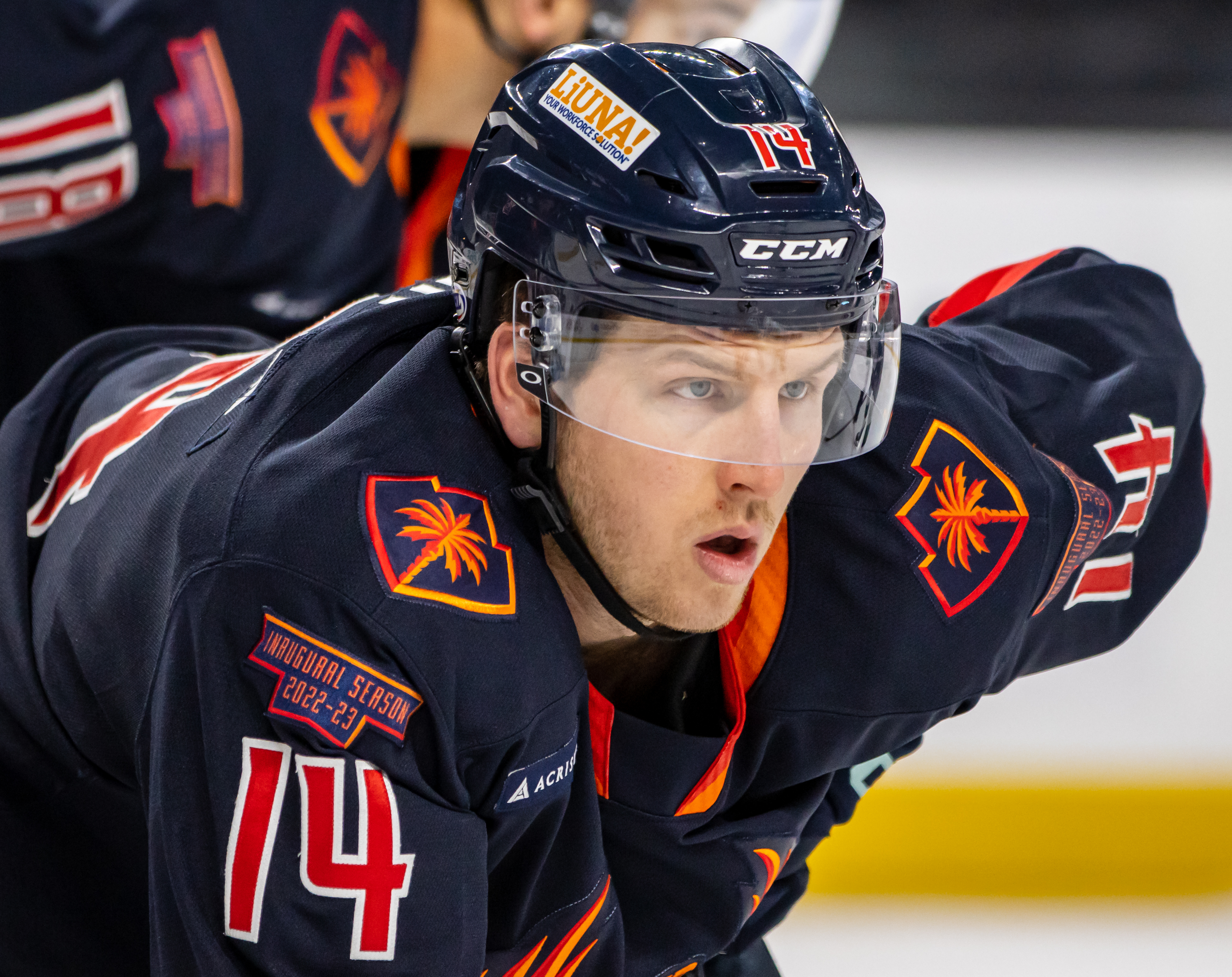
- Poganski with the Coachella Valley Firebirds in 2023
- Born: February 16, 1996 (age 30) St. Cloud, Minnesota, U.S.
- Height: 6 ft 1 in (185 cm)
- Weight: 206 lb (93 kg; 14 st 10 lb)
- Position: Right wing
- Shoots: Right
- AHL team Former teams: Tucson Roadrunners; St. Louis Blues; Winnipeg Jets
- NHL draft: 110th overall, 2014; St. Louis Blues
- Playing career: 2018–present

Austin Richard Poganski (born February 16, 1996) is an American professional ice hockey forward who is currently playing with the Tucson Roadrunners in the American Hockey League (AHL). He was selected by the St. Louis Blues of the National Hockey League (NHL), 110th overall, in the 2014 NHL entry draft.

== Early life ==
Poganski was born on February 16, 1996, in St. Cloud, Minnesota, to parents Rick and Kim Poganski. He first learned to skate on his neighbours outdoor rink and joined a junior mites team when he was around seven years old. Poganski grew up cheering for the St. Cloud State Huskies and had numerous family members who competed for the school. However, after playing for the Junior Sioux AAA team, he began considering playing collegiate hockey for the University of North Dakota.

== Playing career ==
Poganski played junior hockey with the Tri-City Storm in the United States Hockey League (USHL) before committing to collegiate hockey with the University of North Dakota. Prior to his freshman season with the Fighting Sioux, Poganski was selected by the St. Louis Blues of the National Hockey League (NHL) in the fourth round, 110th overall at the 2014 NHL entry draft. He won the national championship with the Fighting Sioux during the 2015–16 season. In his senior season in 2017–18, Pognnski served as captain of the Fighting Sioux. On March 26, 2018, having completed his collegiate career with the Fighting Sioux, Poganski signed a two-year, entry-level contract with the St. Louis Blues. He finished the 2017–18 season with the San Antonio Rampage of the American Hockey League (AHL).

Poganski spent the majority of the 2018–19 season in the AHL and the beginning of the 2019–20 season. He made his NHL debut for the Blues on December 10, 2019, versus the Buffalo Sabres playing on the fourth line with Mackenzie MacEachern and Jacob de la Rose. He was returned to the Rampage on December 13 and finished the season with them. On October 18, 2020, Poganski signed a one-year, two-way contract with the Blues. In the pandemic-delayed and shortened 2020–21 season, Poganski remained on the Blues roster primarily assigned to the club's extended taxi squad roster. Over the duration of the season, Poganski was limited to just five games, going scoreless.

As an unrestricted free agent from the Blues, Poganski was signed to a one-year, two-way contract with the Winnipeg Jets on July 31, 2021. Initially assigned to Winnipeg's AHL affiliate, the Manitoba Moose, Poganski was recalled after several players were put on the COVID-19 protocol list. Poganski got into 16 games with Winnipeg, going scoreless before being placed on waivers on March 3, 2022. After going unclaimed, he was returned to the Moose.

At the conclusion of his contract with the Jets, Poganski was signed as an unrestricted free agent with the Seattle Kraken after agreeing to a one-year, two-way contract on July 13, 2022. Poganski was placed on waivers on October 2, 2022, and after going unclaimed, was assigned to Seattle's AHL affiliate, the Coachella Valley Firebirds, during their inaugural season. He spent the entire year with Coachella, which went to the Calder Cup finals, but were defeated by the Hershey Bears in seven games.

Leaving the Kraken as a free agent, Poganski went un-signed over the summer. He accepted a professional tryout contract (PTO) to attend the Arizona Coyotes 2023 training camp and was later released to sign a PTO with their AHL affiliate, the Tucson Roadrunners, to begin the 2023–24 season.

== Career statistics ==
=== Regular season and playoffs ===
			Regular season					Playoffs
Season	Team	League	GP	G	A	Pts	PIM	GP	G	A	Pts	PIM
2010–11	St. Cloud Cathedral	USHS	25	22	13	35	6	2	0	3	3	0
2011–12	St. Cloud Cathedral	USHS	25	22	27	49	6	2	2	1	3	0
2012–13	St. Cloud Cathedral	USHS	23	25	22	47	14	3	10	9	19	2
2012–13	Tri-City Storm	USHL	2	1	1	2	0	—	—	—	—	—
2013–14	Tri-City Storm	USHL	55	19	12	31	57	—	—	—	—	—
2014–15	U. of North Dakota	NCHC	38	4	10	14	19	—	—	—	—	—
2015–16	U. of North Dakota	NCHC	44	10	15	25	18	—	—	—	—	—
2016–17	U. of North Dakota	NCHC	40	12	13	25	45	—	—	—	—	—
2017–18	U. of North Dakota	NCHC	40	11	9	20	16	—	—	—	—	—
2017–18	San Antonio Rampage	AHL	4	1	1	2	0	—	—	—	—	—
2018–19	San Antonio Rampage	AHL	59	9	22	31	12	—	—	—	—	—
2018–19	Tulsa Oilers	ECHL	3	2	1	3	0	—	—	—	—	—
2019–20	San Antonio Rampage	AHL	56	10	20	30	16	—	—	—	—	—
2019–20	St. Louis Blues	NHL	1	0	0	0	0	—	—	—	—	—
2020–21	St. Louis Blues	NHL	5	0	0	0	0	—	—	—	—	—
2021–22	Manitoba Moose	AHL	49	9	21	30	20	5	0	1	1	0
2021–22	Winnipeg Jets	NHL	16	0	0	0	7	—	—	—	—	—
2022–23	Coachella Valley Firebirds	AHL	70	8	20	28	30	24	2	2	4	10
2023–24	Tucson Roadrunners	AHL	63	14	17	31	50	2	0	0	0	2
2024–25	Tucson Roadrunners	AHL	71	15	26	41	24	3	0	0	0	7
2025–26	Tucson Roadrunners	AHL	70	23	33	56	18	—	—	—	—	—
NHL totals			22	0	0	0	7	—	—	—	—	—

=== International ===
Year	Team	Event	Result	GP	G	A	Pts	PIM
2013	United States	U17	3rd place, bronze medalist(s)	6	6	0	6	0
2013	United States	IH18	2nd place, silver medalist(s)	5	0	2	2	4
Junior totals				11	6	2	8	4
