= National Collegiate Hockey Conference =

U.S. college men's ice hockey conference

- Current season, competition or edition: 2025–26 NCHC season
- Association: NCAA
- Founded: 2011 (began play in 2013)
- Commissioner: Heather Weems
- Sports fielded: Men's ice hockey
- Division: Division I
- No. of teams: 10
- Headquarters: Colorado Springs, Colorado
- Region: Midwestern United States; Western United States
- Website: nchchockey.com

Locations
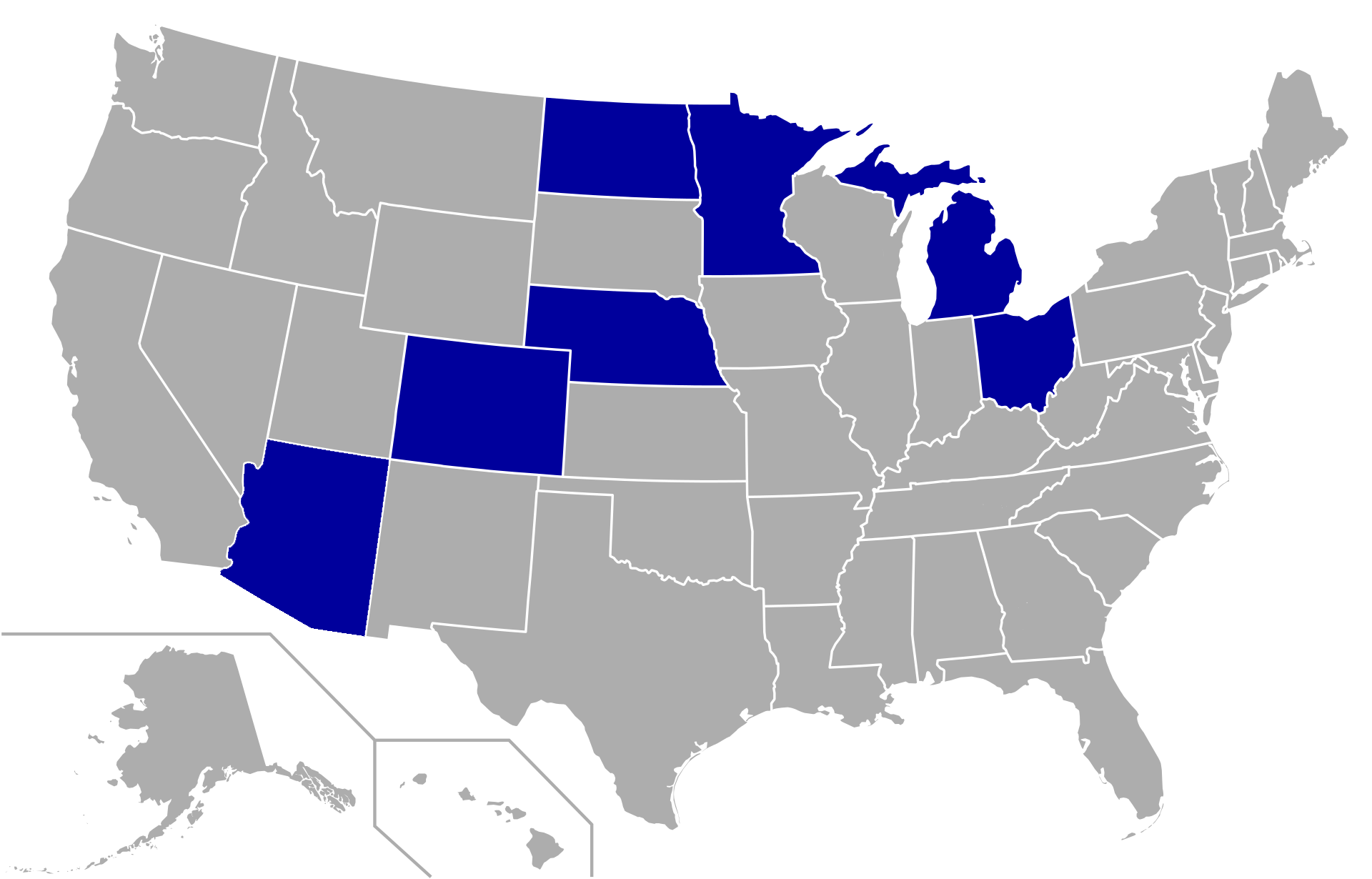

The National Collegiate Hockey Conference (NCHC) is an NCAA men's Division I hockey conference. The league was formed on July 9, 2011, and began playing for the 2013–14 season, the same season that the Big Ten Conference began competition, as a combination of six previous members of the WCHA and two of the CCHA. The league is headquartered in Colorado Springs, Colorado.

== History ==
The men's college ice hockey landscape was shaken on March 21, 2011, when the Big Ten Conference announced it would sponsor the sport following Penn State having fielding a team, bringing the number of Big Ten members with teams to six. The WCHA faced the loss of the Minnesota Golden Gophers and Wisconsin Badgers in the future, whereas the CCHA faced the loss of the Michigan Wolverines, the Michigan State Spartans, and Ohio State Buckeyes. Some of the remaining teams of the WCHA and CCHA began talks to form a league that would ensure their survival as financially strong and successful programs.

On July 9, 2011, the athletic directors of the six founding schools, Colorado College, the University of Denver, Miami University, the University of Minnesota Duluth, the University of Nebraska Omaha, and the University of North Dakota, confirmed these reports by announcing the conference officially and giving the date for a press conference for further information on July 13, 2011.

At the July 13, 2011 press conference, Brian Faison, athletic director of the University of North Dakota, and one of the main speakers said that the motivation for this conference was to put teams together that "have displayed a high level of competitiveness on the ice, [have] an institutional commitment to compete at the highest level within Division I, provide a national platform for exposure, and have wonderful history and tradition within their institution and hockey programs."

On September 22, 2011, St. Cloud State University and Western Michigan University accepted invitations to join the NCHC.

On March 7, 2013, the NCHC unveiled the logo for the inaugural season. It features a shield design with the colors red, white, and blue. Inside the shield are eight stars, presumably representing the eight inaugural members, and a hockey stick on the bottom left.

On May 12, 2022, Heather Weems was named third commissioner of the NCHC.

On July 5, 2023, a report came out that announced that Arizona State University would join the conference beginning in the 2024–25 season. The NCHC officially announced Arizona State's entry later that day.

On May 15, 2024 University of St. Thomas announced they would leave the CCHA to become the tenth member of the conference for the 2026–27 season.

Arizona State University officially became a member of the NCHC on July 1, 2024.

The University of St. Thomas officially joined the conference on July 1, 2026.

== Members ==
| Institution | Location | Founded | Former conference | Type | Enrollment | Nickname | Colors | NCAA championships | Women's conference | Primary conference |
|---|---|---|---|---|---|---|---|---|---|---|
| Arizona State University | Tempe, Arizona | 1885 | Independent | Public | 79,818 | Sun Devils | | 0 | Independent (ACHA) | Big 12 |
| Colorado College | Colorado Springs, Colorado | 1874 | WCHA | Private | 2,056 | Tigers | | 2 | N/A | SCAC (D-III) |
| University of Denver | Denver, Colorado | 1864 | WCHA | Private | 12,894 | Pioneers | | 11 | N/A | WCC |
| Miami University | Oxford, Ohio | 1809 | CCHA | Public | 18,838 | RedHawks | | 0 | N/A | MAC |
| University of Minnesota Duluth | Duluth, Minnesota | 1902 | WCHA | Public | 9,253 | Bulldogs | | 3 | WCHA | Northern Sun (D-II) |
| University of Nebraska Omaha | Omaha, Nebraska | 1908 | WCHA | Public | 14,972 | Mavericks | | 0 | N/A | Summit League |
| University of North Dakota | Grand Forks, North Dakota | 1883 | WCHA | Public | 15,019 | Fighting Hawks | | 8 | N/A (Note: North Dakota's women's team was a member of the WCHA before the university dropped the program in 2017.) | Summit League |
| St. Cloud State University | St. Cloud, Minnesota | 1869 | WCHA | Public | 10,164 | Huskies | | 0 | WCHA | Northern Sun (D-II) |
| University of St. Thomas | Saint Paul, Minnesota | 1885 | CCHA | Private/Catholic (diocesan) | 9,445 | Tommies | | 0 | WCHA | Summit League |
| Western Michigan University | Kalamazoo, Michigan | 1903 | CCHA | Public | 17,605 | Broncos | | 1 | N/A | MAC |

Current NCHC members

== Championships, Frozen Fours, and NCAA Tournament Appearances ==
| School | NCAA Championships | NCAA Runner-Up | NCAA Frozen Fours | NCAA Tournament Appearances | Conference Championships | Conference Tournament Championships |
|---|---|---|---|---|---|---|
| Arizona State | – | – | – | 1 (2019) | – | – |
| Colorado College | 2 (1950, 1957) | 3 (1952, 1955, 1996) | 10 (1948–52, 1955, 1957, 1996, 1997, 2005) | 20 (1948–52, 1955, 1957, 1978, 1995–99, 2001–03, 2005, 2006, 2008, 2011) | 9 (1952, 1955, 1957, 1994–96, 2003, 2005, 2008) | 1 (1978) |
| Denver | 11 (1958, 1960, 1961, 1968, 1969, 2004, 2005, 2017, 2022, 2024, 2026) | 3 (1963, 1964, 1973) | 21 (1958, 1960, 1961, 1963, 1964, 1966, 1968, 1969, 1971–73, 1986, 2004, 2005, 2016, 2017, 2019, 2022, 2024–26) | 35 (1958, 1960, 1961, 1963, 1964, 1966, 1968, 1969, 1971–73, 1986, 1995, 1997, 1999, 2002, 2004, 2005, 2008–19, 2022–26) | 16 (1958, 1960, 1961, 1963, 1964, 1968, 1972, 1973, 1978, 1986, 2002, 2005, 2010, 2017, 2022, 2023) | 19 (1960, 1961, 1963, 1964, 1966, 1968, 1969, 1971–73, 1986, 1999, 2002, 2005, 2008, 2014, 2018, 2024, 2026) |
| Miami | – | 1 (2009) | 2 (2009, 2010) | 12 (1993, 1997, 2004, 2006–13, 2015) | 4 (1993, 2006, 2010, 2013) | 2 (2011, 2015) |
| Minnesota Duluth | 3 (2011, 2018, 2019) | 2 (1984, 2017) | 8 (1984, 1985, 2004, 2011, 2017–19, 2021) | 16 (1983–85, 1993, 2004, 2009, 2011, 2012, 2015–19, 2021, 2022, 2026) | 3 (1984, 1985, 1993) | 6 (1984, 1985, 2009, 2017, 2019, 2022) |
| Omaha | – | – | 1 (2015) | 5 (2006, 2011, 2015, 2021, 2024) | – | – |
| North Dakota | 8 (1959, 1963, 1980, 1982, 1987, 1997, 2000, 2016) | 5 (1958, 1968, 1979, 2001, 2005) | 23 (1958, 1959, 1963, 1965, 1967, 1968, 1979, 1980, 1982, 1984, 1987, 1997, 2000, 2001, 2005–08, 2011, 2014–16, 2026) | 36 (1958, 1959, 1963, 1965, 1967, 1968, 1979, 1980, 1982, 1984, 1987, 1990, 1997–2001, 2003–17, 2021, 2022, 2024, 2026) | 22 (1958, 1963, 1965, 1967, 1979, 1980, 1982, 1987, 1997–99, 2001, 2004, 2009, 2011, 2015, 2016, 2020–22, 2024, 2026) | 12 (1967, 1968, 1979, 1980, 1987, 1997, 2000, 2006, 2010–12, 2021) |
| St. Cloud State | – | 1 (2021) | 2 (2013, 2021) | 17 (1989, 2000–03, 2007, 2008, 2010, 2013–16, 2018, 2019, 2021–23) | 4 (2013, 2014, 2018, 2019) | 3 (2001, 2016, 2023) |
| St. Thomas | – | – | – | – | – | – |
| Western Michigan | 1 (2025) | – | 1 (2025) | 11 (1986, 1994, 1996, 2011, 2012, 2017, 2022–26) | 1 (2025) | 3 (1986, 2012, 2025) |

== Conference Champions ==
| Season | Regular season | NCHC Tournament | Best NCAA Finish |
|---|---|---|---|
| 2013–14 | St. Cloud State | Denver | Frozen Four (North Dakota) |
| 2014–15 | North Dakota | Miami | Frozen Four (North Dakota, Omaha) |
| 2015–16 | North Dakota | St. Cloud State | Champion (North Dakota) |
| 2016–17 | Denver | Minnesota Duluth | Champion (Denver) |
| 2017–18 | St. Cloud State | Denver | Champion (Minnesota Duluth) |
| 2018–19 | St. Cloud State | Minnesota Duluth | Champion (Minnesota Duluth) |
| 2019–20 | North Dakota | Cancelled due to the COVID-19 pandemic. | |
| 2020–21 | North Dakota | North Dakota | Runner-Up (St. Cloud State) |
| 2021–22 | Denver / North Dakota* | Minnesota Duluth | Champion (Denver) |
| 2022–23 | Denver | St. Cloud State | Regional Final (St. Cloud State) |
| 2023–24 | North Dakota | Denver | Champion (Denver) |
| 2024–25 | Western Michigan | Western Michigan | Champion (Western Michigan) |
| 2025–26 | North Dakota | Denver | Champion (Denver) |

(*) Both teams tied in total points resulting in co-champions.

=== Penrose Cup ===
The Penrose Cup trophy has been awarded to the NCHC's regular-season champion since the conference's inaugural season in 2013–14. The award honors Julie and Spencer Penrose, who created the El Pomar Foundation that played a major role in the establishment of the NCHC.

Wins by School
| Team | Wins | Years |
|---|---|---|
| North Dakota | 7 | 2014–15, 2015–16, 2019–20, 2020–21, 2021–22, 2023–24, 2025–26 |
| St. Cloud State | 3 | 2013–14, 2017–18, 2018–19 |
| Denver | 3 | 2016–17, 2021–22, 2022–23 |
| Western Michigan | 1 | 2024–25 |

=== National Cup Champions ===
The NCHC named its previously unnamed conference tournament trophy the National Cup in September 2025.

== Conference arenas ==
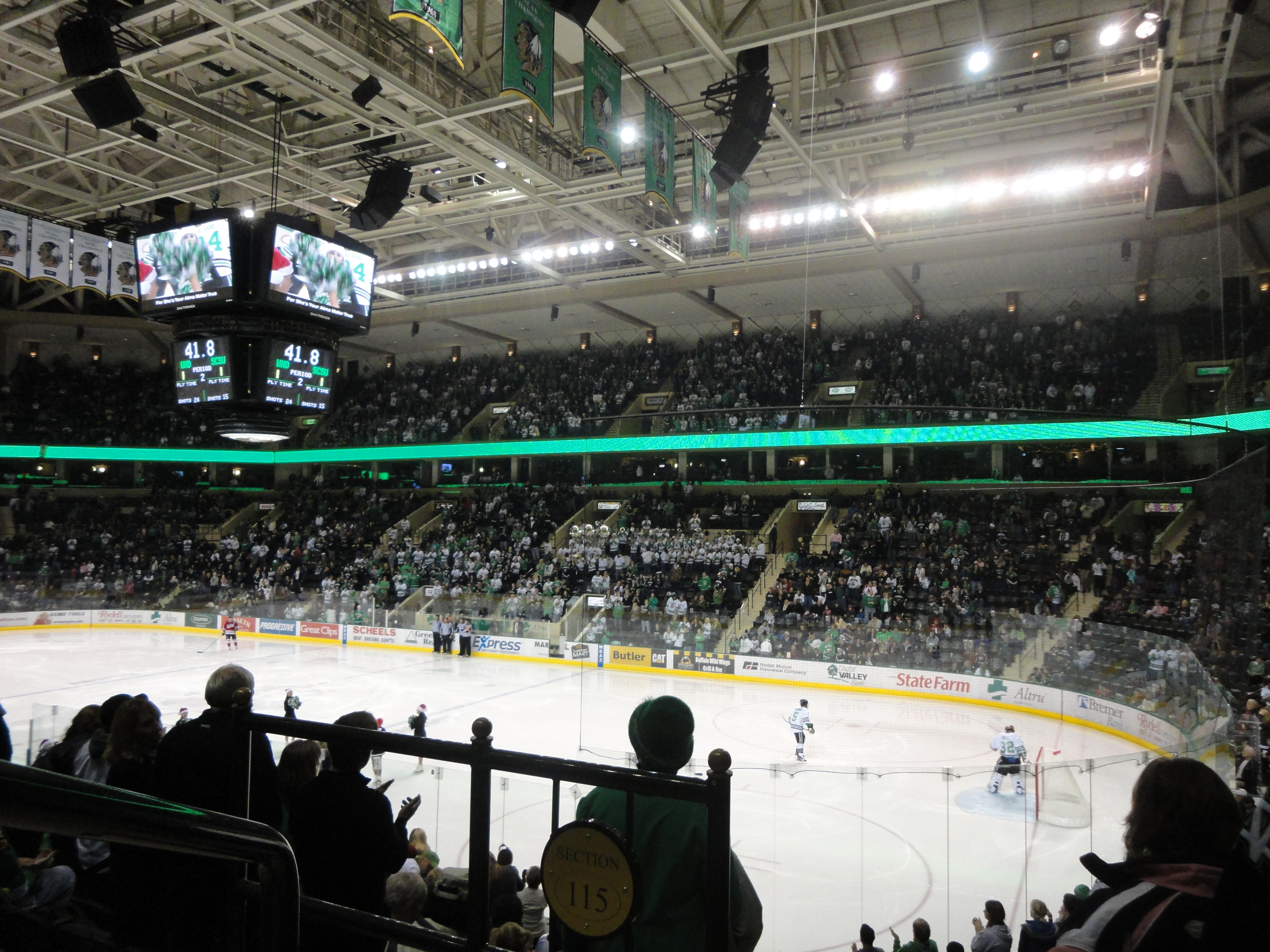
The Ralph Engelstad Arena is one of the largest arenas in college hockey.

| School | Hockey arena | Year opened | Capacity |
|---|---|---|---|
| Arizona State | Mullett Arena | 2022 | 5,000 |
| Colorado College | Ed Robson Arena | 2021 | 3,407 |
| Denver | Magness Arena | 1999 | 6,026 |
| Miami | Goggin Ice Center | 2006 | 3,200 |
| Minnesota Duluth | AMSOIL Arena | 2010 | 6,756 |
| North Dakota | Ralph Engelstad Arena | 2001 | 11,568 |
| Omaha | Baxter Arena | 2015 | 7,898 |
| St. Cloud State | Herb Brooks National Hockey Center | 1989 | 5,159 |
| St. Thomas | Lee & Penny Anderson Arena | 2025 | 4,000 |
| Western Michigan | Lawson Arena | 1974 | 3,667 |

== Awards ==
At the conclusion of each regular season schedule the coaches of each NCHC team vote which players they choose to be on the three All-Conference teams: first team, second team and rookie team. Additionally they vote to award the 10 individual trophies to an eligible player at the same time. The CCHA also awards Most Valuable Player in Tournament which is voted on at the conclusion of the conference tournament. All of the awards were created for the inaugural season (2013–14).

=== All-Conference teams ===
| Award | Inaugural year |
|---|---|
| First Team | 2013–14 |
| Second Team | 2013–14 |
| Rookie Team | 2013–14 |
| All-Tournament Team | 2014 |

=== Individual awards ===
| Award | Inaugural year |
|---|---|
| Player of the Year | 2013–14 |
| Rookie of the Year | 2013–14 |
| Goaltender of the Year | 2013–14 |
| Herb Brooks Coach of the Year | 2013–14 |
| Forward of the Year | 2013–14 |
| Defensive Forward of the Year | 2013–14 |
| Defensive Defenseman of the Year | 2013–14 |
| Offensive Defenseman of the Year | 2013–14 |
| Scholar-Athlete of the Year | 2013–14 |
| Sportsmanship Award | 2013–14 |
| Frozen Faceoff MVP | 2014 |

The 'Defensive Defenseman of the Year' award was known as the 'Defenseman of the Year' award prior to 2017.

== See also ==
- Western Collegiate Hockey Association
- Central Collegiate Hockey Association
- Big Ten Conference
- Battle for the Gold Pan, a famous rivalry between Colorado's two NCHC schools
