= 2017 NCHC Tournament =

2017 NCHC Men's ice hockey tournament
- Dates: March 10–18, 2017
- Teams: 8
- Finals site: Target Center; Minneapolis, Minnesota
- Champions: Minnesota-Duluth Bulldogs (1st title)
- Winning coach: Scott Sandelin (1st title)
- MVP: Alex Iafallo (Minnesota-Duluth)
- NCHC Men's Ice Hockey Tournaments

The 2017 NCHC Tournament was the fourth tournament in league history. It was played between March 10 and March 18, 2017. Quarterfinal games were played at home team campus sites, while the final four games were played at the Target Center in Minneapolis, Minnesota. By winning the tournament, Minnesota-Duluth received the NCHC's automatic bid to the 2017 NCAA Division I Men's Ice Hockey Tournament.

== Format ==
The first round of the postseason tournament features a best-of-three games format. All eight conference teams participate in the tournament. Teams are seeded No. 1 through No. 8 according to their final conference standing, with a tiebreaker system used to seed teams with an identical number of points accumulated. The top four seeded teams each earn home ice and host one of the lower seeded teams.

The winners of the first round series advance to the Target Center for the NCHC Frozen Faceoff. The Frozen Faceoff uses a single-elimination format. Teams are re-seeded No. 1 through No. 4 according to the final regular season conference standings.

=== Conference standings ===
Note: GP = Games played; W = Wins; L = Losses; T = Ties; PTS = Points; GF = Goals For; GA = Goals Against

2016–17 National Collegiate Hockey Conference standings
	Conference record								Overall record					
	GP	W	L	T	SOW	PTS	GF	GA	GP	W	L	T	GF	GA
#1 Denver†	24	18	3	3	2	59	82	42	44	33	7	4	152	80
#2 Minnesota–Duluth*	24	15	5	4	3	52	83	56	42	28	7	7	140	95
#10 Western Michigan	24	13	9	2	1	42	79	75	40	22	13	5	113	114
#9 North Dakota	24	11	12	1	1	35	69	63	40	21	16	3	127	104
St. Cloud State	24	10	13	1	0	31	64	69	36	16	19	1	105	109
Omaha	24	9	13	2	0	29	74	89	39	17	17	5	122	128
Miami	24	5	14	5	3	23	57	80	36	9	20	7	91	113
Colorado College	24	4	16	4	1	17	43	77	36	8	24	4	70	120
Championship: March 18, 2017 † indicates conference regular season champion; * indicates conference tournament champion Rankings: USCHO.com Top 20 Poll; updated March 6, 2017

== Bracket ==
Teams are reseeded after the first round

Quarterfinals; March 10–12
1	Denver	4	4	—
8	Colorado College	0	0	—
2	Minnesota-Duluth	5*	5	—
7	Miami	4	3	—
(Pairings are reseeded after the first round)
3	Western Michigan	1	5	2*
6	Omaha	2*	2	1
4	North Dakota	5	6*	—
5	St. Cloud State	2	5	—

Semifinals; March 17
1	Denver	0
4	North Dakota	1
2	Minnesota-Duluth	5
3	Western Michigan	2

Championship; March 18
4	North Dakota	3
2	Minnesota-Duluth	4
Third Place
1	Denver	3
3	Western Michigan	1

* denotes overtime periods

== Results ==
All times are local.

=== Quarterfinals ===
==== (1) Denver vs. (8) Colorado College ====
March 10	Denver	4 – 1	Colorado College	Magness Arena	Recap
No Scoring		First period	No scoring
(Borgström, Gambrell) Troy Terry - 01:37 (Terry, Butcher) Liam Finlay - GW PP - 06:48 (Terry) Blake Hillman - 09:11		Second period	10:56 - Westin Michaud (Israel, Gooch)
(Lukosevicius, Gambrell) Matt Marcinew - PP - 12:36		Third period	No scoring
( 21 saves / 22 shots ) Tanner Jaillet		Goalie stats	Alex Leclerc ( 42 saves / 46 shots )

March 11	Denver	4 – 0	Colorado College	Magness Arena	Recap
No Scoring		First period	No scoring
(McLellan, VanVoorhis) Logan O'Connor - GW - 04:48 (McLellan, Hammond) Logan O'Connor - 10:09		Second period	No scoring
(Borgström, Cowley) Troy Terry - SH - 00:18 (unassisted) Troy Terry - PP - 11:50		Third period	No scoring
( 17 saves / 17 shots ) Evan Cowley		Goalie stats	Alex Leclerc ( 27 saves / 31 shots )

Denver won series 2–0

==== (2) Minnesota–Duluth vs. (7) Miami ====
March 10	Minnesota–Duluth	5 – 4	OT	Miami	AMSOIL Arena	Recap
(unassisted) Parker Mackay - 05:21		First period		05:50 - Zach LaValle (Green, Switzer); 06:25 - Carson Meyer (Louis, Dornbrock)
(Wolff) Riley Tufte - 03:44 (Raskob, Molenaar) Alex Iafallo - 16:37		Second period		15:54 - Gordie Green (Hutton, Brandt)
(Kuhlman, Peterson) Riley Tufte - 12:19		Third period		11:14 - Ryan Siroky (Hutton, Bachman)
(Iafallo) Dominic Toninato - GW - 07:24		First overtime period		No scoring
( 18 saves / 22 shots ) Hunter Miska		Goalie stats		Ryan Larkin ( 7 saves / 8 shots ) / Chase Munroe ( 29 saves / 33 shots )

March 11	Minnesota–Duluth	5 – 3	Miami	AMSOIL Arena	Recap
(Iafallo, Toninato) Brenden Kotyk - 02:49		First period	No scoring
(Mackay, Osterberg) Nick Wolff - GW - 08:59		Second period	10:42 - Justin Greenberg (Hutton, Sherwood)
(Osterberg, Wolff) Jared Thomas - 13:25 (Anderson, Wolff) Alex Iafallo - GW - 15:37 (Anderson, Pionk) Dominic Toninato - EN - 18:55		Third period	01:25 - Kiefer Sherwood (LaValle, Green); 03:17 - Anthony Louis (Knierim, Dornbrock)
( 21 saves / 24 shots ) Hunter Miska		Goalie stats	Chase Munroe ( 31 saves / 35 shots )

Minnesota–Duluth won series 2–0

==== (3) Western Michigan vs. (6) Nebraska-Omaha ====
March 10	Western Michigan	1 – 2	OT	Nebraska-Omaha	Lawson Arena	Recap
(Conrad) Paul Stoykewych - 15:34		First period		No scoring
No scoring		Second period		09:38 - Jake Randolph (Nogard)
No scoring		Third period		No scoring
No scoring		First overtime period		04:17 - GW - Justin Parizek (Morelli)
( 35 saves / 36 shots ) Ben Blacker		Goalie stats		Evan Weninger ( 27 saves / 28 shots )

March 11	Western Michigan	5 – 2	Nebraska-Omaha	Lawson Arena	Recap
(Allison, McGing) Colt Conrad - 07:56 (Conrad, Allison) Hugh McGing - 10:49		First period	00:48 - Tyler Vesel (Parizek, Morelli)
No scoring		Second period	00:13 - Austin Ortega (Pope, Olofsson)
(Schueneman) Wade Allison - GW - 00:52 (Conrad, Moldenhauer) Hugh McGing - 12:21 (Conrad, Bafia) Michael Rebry - 13:11		Third period	No scoring
( 36 saves / 38 shots ) Ben Blacker		Goalie stats	Evan Weninger ( 27 saves / 32 shots )

March 12	Western Michigan	2 – 1	OT	Nebraska-Omaha	Lawson Arena	Recap
(unassisted) Griffen Molino - 19:31		First period		06:31 - Tyler Vesel (Ortega, Pope)
No scoring		Second period		No scoring
No scoring		Third period		No scoring
(Courtnall, Moldenhauer) Michael Rebry - GW - 00:34		First overtime period		No scoring
( 22 saves / 23 shots ) Ben Blacker		Goalie stats		Evan Weninger ( 30 saves / 32 shots )

Western Michigan won series 2–1

==== (4) North Dakota vs. (5) St. Cloud State ====
March 10	North Dakota	5 – 2	St. Cloud State	Ralph Engelstad Arena	Recap
(Bowen, Poolman) Rhett Gardner - 13:39 (unassisted) Shane Gersich - 14:53		First period	No scoring
(Poolman, Hoff) Brock Boeser - GW PP - 16:27		Second period	09:43 - PP - Jacob Benson (Eyssimont, Schuldt)
(Gersich, Ausmus) Austin Poganski - 12:18 (Boeser) Joel Janatuinen - EN - 19:15		Third period	10:48 - PP - Jimmy Schuldt (Jackson, Winiecki)
( 26 saves / 28 shots ) Cam Johnson		Goalie stats	Jeff Smith ( 31 saves / 35 shots )

March 11	North Dakota	6 – 5	OT	St. Cloud State	Ralph Engelstad Arena	Recap
(Jost, Wolanin) Austin Poganski - PP - 19:16		First period		15:11 - Nick Poehling (Widman, Poehling)
(Poganski) Tyson Jost - SH - 00:53 (Gardner, Johnson) Brock Boeser - 10:37		Second period		08:46 - Patrick Newell (Jackson, Winiecki)
(Olson) Shane Gersich - 10:28 (Simonson, Smith) Christian Wolanin - 15:58		Third period		17:12 - Jon Lizotte (Storm, Wahlin); 11:30 - Jon Lizotte (unassisted); 11:30 - Nick Poehling (unassisted)
(Simonson, Smith) Trevor Olson - GW - 07:38		First overtime period		No scoring
( 30 saves / 35 shots ) Cam Johnson		Goalie stats		Jeff Smith ( 35 saves / 41 shots )

North Dakota won series 2–0

=== Semifinals ===
==== (1) Denver vs. (4) North Dakota ====
March 17	Denver	0 – 1	North Dakota	Target Center	Recap
No Scoring		First period	No scoring
No scoring		Second period	No scoring
No scoring		Third period	02:30 - GW - Austin Poganski (Poolman, Jost)
( 23 saves / 24 shots ) Tanner Jaillet		Goalie stats	Cam Johnson ( 21 saves / 21 shots )

==== (2) Minnesota–Duluth vs. (3) Western Michigan ====
March 17	Minnesota–Duluth	5 – 2	Western Michigan	Target Center	Recap
(Iafallo, Johnson) Dominic Toninato - PP - 13:09 (Hilderman, Johnson) Kyle Osterberg - 16:58		First period	16:34 - Taylor Fleming (Molino, Tiffels)
(Mackay, Pionk) Alex Iafallo - GW - 16:11		Second period	07:10 - Colt Conrad (Fleming, McGing)
(Johnson, Osterberg) Parker Mackay - 14:58 (unassisted) Jared Thomas - EN - 17:59		Third period	No scoring
( 24 saves / 26 shots ) Hunter Miska		Goalie stats	Ben Blacker ( 18 saves / 22 shots )

=== Third place ===
==== (1) Denver vs. (3) Western Michigan ====
March 18	Denver	3 – 1	Western Michigan	Target Center	Recap
(Davies, Hillman) Colin Staub - PP - 08:33		First period	No scoring
(McLellan, Janssen) Liam Finlay - GW - 06:37		Second period	05:29 - Mike McKee (Hadley, Molino)
(Davies, Hillman) Colin Staub - 14:42		Third period	No scoring
( 28 saves / 29 shots ) Evan Cowley		Goalie stats	Ben Blacker ( 18 saves / 21 shots )

=== Championship ===
==== (2) Minnesota–Duluth vs. (4) North Dakota ====
March 18	Minnesota–Duluth	4 – 3	North Dakota	Target Center	Recap
No Scoring		First period	13:03 - PP - Brock Boeser (Jost, Wolanin)
(Anderson, Iafallo) Dominic Toninato - 01:30 (Kuhlman, Peterson) Riley Tufte - 01:47 (Pionk, Iafallo) Adam Johnson - PP - 02:28		Second period	09:00 - PP - Tyson Jost (Olson, Boeser)
(Johnson, Pionk) Joey Anderson - GW - 19:09		Third period	17:14 - PP - Trevor Olson (Wolanin, Jost)
( 32 saves / 35 shots ) Hunter Miska		Goalie stats	Cam Johnson ( 19 saves / 23 shots )

== Tournament awards ==
=== Frozen Faceoff All-Tournament Team ===
- F Alex Iafallo* (Minnesota-Duluth)
- F Tyson Jost (North Dakota)
- F Dominic Toninato (Minnesota-Duluth)
- D Tucker Poolman (North Dakota)
- D Neal Pionk (Minnesota-Duluth)
- G Hunter Miksa (Minnesota-Duluth)

Notes:

- * Most Valuable Player(s)
