= 2012–13 USHL season =

2012-13 USHL Season
- League: United States Hockey League
- Sport: Ice hockey
- Duration: September 28, 2012 – May 17, 2013
- Games: 64
- Teams: 16

Draft
- Top draft pick: Tony Calderone
- Picked by: Sioux Falls Stampede

Regular season
- Anderson Cup: Dubuque Fighting Saints
- Season MVP: Taylor Cammarata (Waterloo Black Hawks)
- Top scorer: Taylor Cammarata (Waterloo Black Hawks)

Playoffs
- Playoffs MVP: Mike Szmatula (Fighting Saints)
- Finals champions: Dubuque Fighting Saints
- Runners-up: Fargo Force

USHL seasons
- 2011–12 2013–14

The 2012–13 USHL season is the 34th season of the United States Hockey League as an all-junior league. The regular season began on September 28, 2012, and concluded on April 13, 2013, with the regular season champion winning the Anderson Cup.

The playoffs began on April 16, 2013, and completed on May 17, 2013. The top four teams from each conference competed for the Clark Cup, with all series played in a best-of-five format.

This season was the 21st season in which one team captured both the Anderson Cup and the Clark Cup in the same season. It was the first time the Dubuque Fighting Saints accomplished this feat.

== Regular season ==
Final standings reflect games played through April 14, 2013

Note: GP = Games played; W = Wins; L = Losses; OTL = Overtime losses; PTS = Points; GF = Goals for; GA = Goals against; PIM = Penalties in minutes
x = clinched playoff berth; y = clinched conference title; z = clinched regular season title

=== Eastern Conference ===
| Team | GP | W | L | OTL | PTS | GF | GA | PIM |
|---|---|---|---|---|---|---|---|---|
| z-Dubuque Fighting Saints | 64 | 45 | 11 | 8 | 98 | 247 | 154 | 1055 |
| x-Green Bay Gamblers | 64 | 37 | 23 | 4 | 78 | 234 | 207 | 1069 |
| x-Youngstown Phantoms | 64 | 37 | 27 | 0 | 74 | 215 | 199 | 1346 |
| x-Muskegon Lumberjacks | 64 | 31 | 23 | 10 | 72 | 183 | 175 | 924 |
| Chicago Steel | 64 | 29 | 31 | 4 | 62 | 179 | 212 | 1069 |
| Cedar Rapids RoughRiders | 64 | 25 | 30 | 9 | 59 | 188 | 221 | 970 |
| Team USA | 64 | 22 | 37 | 5 | 49 | 178 | 230 | 999 |
| Indiana Ice | 64 | 21 | 37 | 6 | 48 | 181 | 249 | 816 |

=== Western Conference ===
| Team | GP | W | L | OTL | PTS | GF | GA | PIM |
|---|---|---|---|---|---|---|---|---|
| y-Sioux Falls Stampede | 64 | 45 | 17 | 2 | 92 | 241 | 187 | 1047 |
| x-Fargo Force | 64 | 38 | 19 | 7 | 83 | 229 | 201 | 981 |
| x-Waterloo Black Hawks | 64 | 39 | 21 | 4 | 82 | 273 | 217 | 923 |
| x-Lincoln Stars | 64 | 39 | 22 | 3 | 81 | 217 | 191 | 1538 |
| Omaha Lancers | 64 | 34 | 29 | 1 | 69 | 177 | 183 | 1038 |
| Sioux City Musketeers | 64 | 23 | 30 | 11 | 57 | 196 | 200 | 1376 |
| Des Moines Buccaneers | 64 | 25 | 35 | 4 | 54 | 189 | 245 | 1570 |
| Tri-City Storm | 64 | 22 | 35 | 7 | 51 | 189 | 245 | 931 |

== Players ==
=== Scoring leaders ===
Final statistics reflect games played through April 14, 2013

Note: GP = Games played; G = Goals; A = Assists; PTS = Points; +/- = Plus/Minus Rating; PIM = Penalties in minutes

| Player | Team | GP | G | A | PTS | +/- | PIM |
|---|---|---|---|---|---|---|---|
| Taylor Cammarata | Waterloo Black Hawks | 59 | 38 | 55 | 93 | +39 | 49 |
| Justin Kloos | Waterloo Black Hawks | 54 | 29 | 58 | 87 | +34 | 22 |
| Zach Stepan | Waterloo Black Hawks | 56 | 32 | 46 | 78 | +25 | 50 |
| Kyle Novak | Green Bay Gamblers | 64 | 27 | 50 | 77 | +23 | 19 |
| Mike Szmatula | Dubuque Fighting Saints | 63 | 37 | 39 | 76 | +49 | 40 |
| Jake Guentzel | Sioux City Musketeers | 60 | 29 | 44 | 73 | +13 | 24 |
| Nicholas Schilkey | Green Bay Gamblers | 59 | 32 | 39 | 71 | +10 | 27 |
| Peter Quenneville | Dubuque Fighting Saints | 63 | 33 | 37 | 70 | +29 | 18 |
| Dominic Toninato | Fargo Force | 64 | 29 | 41 | 70 | +29 | 50 |
| Brendan Harms | Fargo Force | 64 | 25 | 45 | 70 | +33 | 45 |

=== Leading goaltenders ===
Final statistics reflect games played through April 14, 2013

Note: GP = Games played; MIN = Minutes played; W = Wins; L = Losses: OTL = Overtime losses; SL = Shootout losses; SO = Shutouts; GA = Goals Allowed; GAA = Goals against average; SV% = Save percentage

| Player | Team | GP | MIN | W | L | OTL | SO | GA | GAA | SV% |
|---|---|---|---|---|---|---|---|---|---|---|
| Artt Brey | Dubuque Fighting Saints | 38 | 2084:24 | 24 | 6 | 4 | 3 | 77 | 2.22 | 0.904 |
| Kevin Lindskoug | Muskegon Lumberjacks | 46 | 2707:52 | 23 | 17 | 6 | 8 | 112 | 2.48 | 0.924 |
| Connor Girard | Sioux City Musketeers | 33 | 1854:40 | 18 | 10 | 3 | 2 | 77 | 2.49 | 0.904 |
| Alex Lyon | Omaha Lancers | 50 | 2894:00 | 26 | 21 | 1 | 1 | 128 | 2.65 | 0.916 |
| Kyle Hayton | Sioux City Musketeers | 25 | 1515:23 | 13 | 8 | 4 | 0 | 67 | 2.65 | 0.911 |

== Clark Cup Playoffs ==
Conference Semi-Finals (Best of 5)
1 | Dubuque | 3
4 | Muskegon | 0
Eastern Conference
3 | Youngstown | 3
2 | Green Bay | 1
2 | Fargo | 3
3 | Waterloo | 2
Western Conference
4 | Lincoln | 2
1 | Sioux Falls | 3

Conference Finals (Best of 5)
1 | Dubuque | 3
3 | Youngstown | 2
2 | Fargo | 3
1 | Sioux Falls | 2

Clark Cup Championship (Best of 5)
E1 | Dubuque | 3
W2 | Fargo | 0

== Conference Semi-Finals ==
Note 1: All times are local.
Note 2: Game times in italics signify games to be played only if necessary.
Note 3: Home team is listed first.

=== Eastern Conference ===
==== (1) Dubuque Fighting Saints vs. (4) Muskegon Lumberjacks ====
| April 17 | Dubuque Fighting Saints | 4 – 1 | Muskegon Lumberjacks | Mystique Ice Center | Recap |
| 8:53 - Frank DiChiara (1) | | First period | No scoring |
| 0:17 - Joseph Manno (1); 12:11 - pp - Mike Szmatula (1) | | Second period | No scoring |
| 13:55 - pp - Karson Kuhlman (1) | | Third period | Adam Gilmour (1) - pp - 2:36 |
| Artt Brey (20 saves / 21 shots) | | Goalie stats | Kevin Lindskoug (24 saves / 28 shots) |

| April 19 | Dubuque Fighting Saints | 4 – 3 | Muskegon Lumberjacks | Mystique Ice Center | Recap |
| 12:24 - pp - Peter Quenneville (1) | | First period | Christian Heil (1) - 14:23 |
| 4:33 - Evan Janssen (1); 17:58 - Karson Kuhlman (2); 18:24 - Peter Quenneville (2) | | Second period | Frederik Tiffels (1) - 14:13 |
| No scoring | | Third period | Jeff Kubiak (1) - 18:58 |
| Artt Brey (14 saves / 17 shots) | | Goalie stats | Kevin Lindskoug (21 saves / 25 shots); Jordan Uhelski (7 saves / 7 shots) |

| April 21 | Muskegon Lumberjacks | 2 – 3 | OT | Dubuque Fighting Saints | L. C. Walker Arena | Recap |
| No scoring | | First period | | Mike Szmatula (2) - pp - 12:10; Seamus Malone (1) - 14:54 |
| No scoring | | Second period | | No scoring |
| 12:36 - Cullen Hurley (1); 15:45 - Cameron Darcy (1) | | Third period | | No scoring |
| No scoring | | First overtime period | | Frank DiChiara (2) - 11:12 |
| Kevin Lindskoug (31 saves / 34 shots) | | Goalie stats | | Artt Brey (32 saves / 34 shots) |

| Dubuque wins series 3 – 0 |

==== (2) Green Bay Gamblers vs. (3) Youngstown Phantoms ====
| April 17 | Green Bay Gamblers | 3 – 1 | Youngstown Phantoms | Resch Center | Recap |
| 11:56 - Kevin Irwin (1); 14:17 - Nicholas Schilkey (1); 19:26 - pp - Kevin Irwin (2) | | First period | No scoring |
| No scoring | | Second period | John Padulo (1) - 8:26 |
| No scoring | | Third period | No scoring |
| Tony Kujava (27 saves / 28 shots) | | Goalie stats | Sean Romeo (22 saves / 25 shots) |

| April 18 | Green Bay Gamblers | 2 – 4 | Youngstown Phantoms | Resch Center | Recap |
| 7:30 - Alex Kile (1) | | First period | Cameron Brown (1) - pp - 19:07 |
| 3:27 - pp - Nick Schmaltz (1) | | Second period | No scoring |
| No scoring | | Third period | J.J. Piccinich (1) - 2:51; John Padulo (2) - pp - 5:00; Sam Anas (1) - 11:35 |
| Tony Kujava (24 saves / 28 shots) | | Goalie stats | Sean Romeo (23 saves / 25 shots) |

| April 20 | Youngstown Phantoms | 4 – 2 | Green Bay Gamblers | Covelli Centre | Recap |
| 10:15 - pp - Cameron Brown (2) | | First period | Sheldon Dries (1) - 3:51 |
| 0:23 - pp - Cameron Brown (3); 1:40 - Markus McCrea (1); 19:07 - Sam Anas (2) | | Second period | No scoring |
| No scoring | | Third period | Sebastian Weberg (1) - 9:53 |
| Sean Romeo (26 saves / 28 shots) | | Goalie stats | Tony Kujava (19 saves / 23 shots) |

| April 21 | Youngstown Phantoms | 3 – 1 | Green Bay Gamblers | Covelli Centre | Recap |
| No scoring | | First period | Christian Wolanin (1) - 13:41 |
| 11:49 - Luke Stork (1) | | Second period | No scoring |
| 14:08 - Cameron Brown (4); 19:37 - en - Alexander Dahl (1) | | Third period | No scoring |
| Sean Romeo (25 saves / 26 shots) | | Goalie stats | Tony Kujava (20 saves / 22 shots) |

| Youngstown wins series 3 – 1 |

=== Western Conference ===
==== (1) Sioux Falls Stampede vs. (4) Lincoln Stars ====
| April 16 | Sioux Falls Stampede | 3 – 2 | OT | Lincoln Stars | Sioux Falls Arena | Recap |
| 9:32 - Tony Calderone (1) | | First period | | No scoring |
| 6:22 - Zeb Knutson (1) | | Second period | | Will Suter (1) - 6:55 |
| No scoring | | Third period | | Dominik Shine (1) - 4:39 |
| 1:21 - Tony Calderone (2) | | First overtime period | | No scoring |
| Charlie Lindgren (28 saves / 30 shots) | | Goalie stats | | Jackson Teichroeb (30 saves / 33 shots) |

| April 17 | Sioux Falls Stampede | 0 – 4 | Lincoln Stars | Sioux Falls Arena | Recap |
| No scoring | | First period | Will Suter (2) - 11:14 |
| No scoring | | Second period | Eric Scheid (1) - 6:41 |
| No scoring | | Third period | Justin Woods (1) - 4:43; Zach Aston-Reese (1) - 13:55 |
| Charlie Lindgren (29 saves / 33 shots) | | Goalie stats | Michael Bitzer (43 saves / 43 shots) |

| April 19 | Lincoln Stars | 4 – 1 | Sioux Falls Stampede | Ice Box | Recap |
| 8:23 - pp - Vinni Lettieri (1) | | First period | No scoring |
| 4:36 - Zach Aston-Reese (2) | | Second period | Zeb Knutson (2) - 2:34 |
| 7:25 - pp - Zach Aston-Reese (3); 15:45 - pp - Eric Scheid (2) | | Third period | No scoring |
| Michael Bitzer (32 saves / 33 shots) | | Goalie stats | Charlie Lindgren (35 saves / 39 shots) |

| April 20 | Lincoln Stars | 1 – 2 | Sioux Falls Stampede | Ice Box | Recap |
| No scoring | | First period | No scoring |
| No scoring | | Second period | Vincent Muto (1) - 1:28 |
| 13:57 - sh - Paul LaDue (1) | | Third period | Sam Rothstein (1) - 8:24 |
| Michael Bitzer (22 saves / 24 shots) | | Goalie stats | Charlie Lindgren (22 saves / 23 shots) |

| April 23 | Sioux Falls Stampede | 2 – 0 | Lincoln Stars | Sioux Falls Arena | Recap |
| No scoring | | First period | No scoring |
| No scoring | | Second period | No scoring |
| 1:19 - Ryan Siiro (1); 19:19 - en - Thomas Forgione (1) | | Third period | No scoring |
| Charlie Lindgren (34 saves / 34 shots) | | Goalie stats | Michael Bitzer (40 saves / 41 shots) |

| Sioux Falls wins series 3 – 2 |

==== (2) Fargo Force vs. (3) Waterloo Black Hawks ====
| April 17 | Fargo Force | 3 – 2 | Waterloo Black Hawks | Scheels Arena | Recap |
| No scoring | | First period | Zach Stepan (1) - pp - 11:17 |
| 9:19 - Gabe Guertler (1); 13:23 - Dave Gust (1) | | Second period | No scoring |
| 18:25 - Austin Ortega (1) | | Third period | Taylor Cammarata (1) - pp - 14:50 |
| Brendan Jensen (26 saves / 28 shots) | | Goalie stats | Cal Petersen (27 saves / 30 shots) |

| April 19 | Fargo Force | 4 – 5 | Waterloo Black Hawks | Scheels Arena | Recap |
| 3:46 - pp - Gavin Bayreuther (1) | | First period | Ian McCoshen (1) - pp - 9:00; Austin Vieth (1) - 9:21; Ryan Papa (1) - 10:55; Victor Newell (1) - 13:13 |
| 14:04 - Alex Iafallo (1); 19:47 - sh - Gabe Guertler (2) | | Second period | Austin Vieth (2) - 5:16 |
| 13:54 - Dave Gust (2) | | Third period | No scoring |
| Brendan Jensen (35 saves / 40 shots) | | Goalie stats | Cal Petersen (35 saves / 39 shots) |

| April 21 | Waterloo Black Hawks | 6 – 4 | Fargo Force | Young Arena | Recap |
| No scoring | | First period | Brendan Harms (1) - 15:20; Gavin Bayreuther (2) - pp - 19:46 |
| 12:47 - Vinnie Hinostroza (1); 14:13 - pp - Vinnie Hinostroza (2); 15:02 - pp - Mark Friedman (1) | | Second period | Jordan Nelson (1) - sh - 15:47 |
| 12:20 - Chris Leibinger (1); 13:43 - Ryan Papa (2); 19:10 - en - Vinnie Hinostroza (3) | | Third period | Austin Ortega (2) - 1:56 |
| Cal Petersen (32 saves / 36 shots) | | Goalie stats | Brendan Jensen (42 saves / 47 shots) |

| April 23 | Waterloo Black Hawks | 3 – 6 | Fargo Force | Young Arena | Recap |
| No scoring | | First period | Dominic Toninato (1) - pp - 6:39; Austin Ortega (3) - 11:47 |
| 13:28 - Taylor Cammarata (2); 18:38 - Zach Stepan (2) | | Second period | Alex Iafallo (2) - 6:12; Austin Ortega (4) - 11:50 |
| 17:43 - pp - Vinnie Hinostroza (4) | | Third period | Brendan Harms (2) - 5:57; Brendan Harms (3) - en - 19:30 |
| Cal Petersen (17 saves / 21 shots); Eamon McAdam (14 saves / 15 shots) | | Goalie stats | Brendan Jensen (34 saves / 37 shots) |

| April 24 | Fargo Force | 4 – 3 | OT | Waterloo Black Hawks | Scheels Arena | Recap |
| 7:38 - Austin Ortega (5) | | First period | | Mark Friedman (2) - 0:43 |
| 1:36 - Gabe Guertler (3) | | Second period | | Ian McCoshen (2) - 18:11 |
| 16:26 - Alex Iafallo (3) | | Third period | | Zach Stepan (3) - 7:27 |
| 6:38 - Gabe Guertler (4) | | First overtime period | | No scoring |
| Cam Johnson (34 saves / 37 shots) | | Goalie stats | | Eamon McAdam (45 saves / 49 shots) |

| Fargo wins series 3 – 2 |

== Conference Finals ==
Note 1: All times are local.
Note 2: Game times in italics signify games to be played only if necessary.
Note 3: Home team is listed first.

=== Eastern Conference ===
==== (1) Dubuque Fighting Saints vs. (3) Youngstown Phantoms ====
| April 26 | Dubuque Fighting Saints | 3 – 2 | Youngstown Phantoms | Mystique Ice Center | Recap |
| No scoring | | First period | No scoring |
| 10:08 - Jarrid Privitera (1); 12:12 - Karson Kuhlman (3) | | Second period | No scoring |
| 8:31 - pp - Peter Quenneville (3) | | Third period | John Padulo (3) - 10:24; Sam Anas (3) - 11:16 |
| Artt Brey (23 saves / 25 shots) | | Goalie stats | Sean Romeo (21 saves / 24 shots) |

| April 27 | Dubuque Fighting Saints | 3 – 1 | Youngstown Phantoms | Mystique Ice Center | Recap |
| No scoring | | First period | No scoring |
| 3:41 - Kyle McKenzie (1) | | Second period | Alfred Larsson (1) - 3:08 |
| 2:37 - Frank DiChiara (3); 19:48 - pp - en - Karson Kuhlman (4) | | Third period | No scoring |
| Artt Brey (23 saves / 24 shots) | | Goalie stats | Sean Romeo (25 saves / 27 shots) |

| April 29 | Youngstown Phantoms | 4 – 3 | Dubuque Fighting Saints | Covelli Centre | Recap |
| 19:28 - pp - Austin Cangelosi (1) | | First period | Evan Janssen (2) - 12:21; Peter Quenneville (4) - 14:01 |
| No scoring | | Second period | Mike Szmatula (3) - 5:22 |
| 3:34 - pp - Cameron Brown (5); 4:01 - Markus McCrea (2); 16:23 - pp - John Padulo (4) | | Third period | No scoring |
| Sean Romeo (21 saves / 24 shots) | | Goalie stats | Artt Brey (36 saves / 40 shots) |

| April 30 | Youngstown Phantoms | 4 – 2 | Dubuque Fighting Saints | Covelli Centre | Recap |
| 10:46 - Eric Sweetman (1) | | First period | No scoring |
| 14:01 - pp - John Padulo (5) | | Second period | Mike Szmatula (4) - pp - 4:53; Seamus Malone (2) - 9:10 |
| 8:58 - Austin Cangelosi (2); 18:57 - en - John Padulo (6) | | Third period | No scoring |
| Sean Romeo (18 saves / 20 shots) | | Goalie stats | Christian Frey (17 saves / 20 shots) |

| May 4 | Dubuque Fighting Saints | 4 – 0 | Youngstown Phantoms | Mystique Ice Center | Recap |
| No scoring | | First period | No scoring |
| 7:38 - Jarrid Privitera (2); 12:34 - Evan Janssen (3); 13:40 - Shane Sooth (1) | | Second period | No scoring |
| 17:41 - en - Evan Janssen (4) | | Third period | No scoring |
| Artt Brey (23 saves / 23 shots) | | Goalie stats | Sean Romeo (19 saves / 22 shots) |

| Dubuque wins series 3 – 2 |

=== Western Conference ===
==== (1) Sioux Falls Stampede vs. (2) Fargo Force ====
| April 26 | Fargo Force | 3 – 2 | Sioux Falls Stampede | Scheels Arena | Recap |
| 17:06 - Gage Torrel (1) | | First period | Preston Hodge (1) - 17:34 |
| 0:25 - Dominic Toninato (2) | | Second period | No scoring |
| 1:01 - Gabe Guertler (5) | | Third period | Zeb Knutson (3) - pp - 17:45 |
| Cam Johnson (30 saves / 32 shots) | | Goalie stats | Charlie Lindgren (34 saves / 37 shots); David Jacobson (0 saves / 0 shots) |

| April 27 | Fargo Force | 1 – 2 | Sioux Falls Stampede | Scheels Arena | Recap |
| 11:31 - Jordan Nelson (2) | | First period | No scoring |
| No scoring | | Second period | No scoring |
| No scoring | | Third period | Thomas Forgione (2) - 3:48; C.J. Franklin (1) - 10:48 |
| Cam Johnson (39 saves / 41 shots) | | Goalie stats | Charlie Lindgren (33 saves / 34 shots) |

| May 2 | Sioux Falls Stampede | 0 – 1 | Fargo Force | Sioux Falls Arena | Recap |
| No scoring | | First period | Dave Gust (3) - 3:47 |
| No scoring | | Second period | No scoring |
| No scoring | | Third period | No scoring |
| Charlie Lindgren (17 saves / 18 shots) | | Goalie stats | Cam Johnson (31 saves / 31 shots) |

| May 5 | Sioux Falls Stampede | 5 – 3 | Fargo Force | Sioux Falls Arena | Recap |
| 0:15 - Sam Rothstein (2); 12:04 - pp - Zeb Knutson (4) | | First period | Austin Ortega (6) - 6:11 |
| 8:17 - pp - Thomas Forgione (3) | | Second period | Dominic Toninato (3) - 6:18 |
| 9:50 - Dennis Kravchenko (1); 19:51 - en - Dennis Kravchenko (2) | | Third period | Austin Ortega (7) - 12:49 |
| Charlie Lindgren (21 saves / 24 shots) | | Goalie stats | Cam Johnson (33 saves / 37 shots) |

| May 8 | Sioux Falls Stampede | 4 – 7 | Fargo Force | Sioux Falls Arena | Recap |
| 5:35 - Tony Calderone (3); 5:56 - Todd Skirving (1) | | First period | Kenny Gillespie (1) - 7:41 |
| No scoring | | Second period | Taylor Fleming (1) - 2:00; Gabe Guertler (6) - 6:26; Brendan Harms (4) - 17:49 |
| 5:32 - Zeb Knutson (5); 6:29 - Ryan Siiro (2) | | Third period | Kenny Gillespie (2) - 9:30; Alex Iafallo (4) - 11:19; Brendan Harms (5) - en - 19:20 |
| Charlie Lindgren (39 saves / 45 shots) | | Goalie stats | Cam Johnson (22 saves / 26 shots) |

| Fargo wins series 3 – 2 |

== Clark Cup Finals ==
Note 1: All times are local.
Note 2: Game times in italics signify games to be played only if necessary.
Note 3: Home team is listed first.

=== (E1) Dubuque Fighting Saints vs. (W2) Fargo Force ===
| May 10 | Dubuque Fighting Saints | 4 – 1 | Fargo Force | Mystique Ice Center | Recap |
| 6:28 - pp - Mike Szmatula (5); 9:41 - Mike Szmatula (6); 18:17 - pp - Niklas Nevalainen (1) | | First period | Kenny Gillespie (3) - 2:59 |
| 13:42 - sh - John Stevens (1) | | Second period | No scoring |
| No scoring | | Third period | No scoring |
| Artt Brey (18 saves / 19 shots) | | Goalie stats | Brendan Jensen (28 saves / 32 shots) |

| May 11 | Dubuque Fighting Saints | 4 – 1 | Fargo Force | Mystique Ice Center | Recap |
| 11:14 - Peter Quenneville (5); 14:52 - Matt Benning (1) | | First period | No scoring |
| 4:23 - pp - Peter Quenneville (6) | | Second period | Alex Iafallo (5) - 1:16 |
| 19:53 - en - Mike Szmatula (7) | | Third period | No scoring |
| Artt Brey (25 saves / 26 shots) | | Goalie stats | Brendan Jensen (4 saves / 6 shots); Cam Johnson (27 saves / 28 shots) |

| May 17 | Fargo Force | 2 – 3 | OT | Dubuque Fighting Saints | Scheels Arena | Recap |
| 11:30 - pp - Austin Ortega (8) | | First period | | No scoring |
| No scoring | | Second period | | Brandon Carlson (1) - 2:48 |
| 19:31 - Alex Iafallo (6) | | Third period | | Shane Sooth (2) - pp - 8:05 |
| No scoring | | First overtime period | | Frank DiChiara (4) - 8:17 |
| Cam Johnson (40 saves / 43 shots) | | Goalie stats | | Artt Brey (29 saves / 31 shots) |

| Dubuque wins series 3 – 0 |

== Playoff Statistics ==
Statistics reflect games played through May 17, 2013

=== Scoring leaders ===
Note: GP = Games played; G = Goals; A = Assists; PTS = Points; +/- = Plus/Minus Rating; PIM = Penalty minutes

| Player | Team | GP | G | A | PTS | +/- | PIM |
|---|---|---|---|---|---|---|---|
| Alex Iafallo | Fargo Force | 13 | 6 | 10 | 16 | +1 | 4 |
| Dave Gust | Fargo Force | 13 | 3 | 12 | 15 | +6 | 4 |
| Austin Ortega | Fargo Force | 13 | 7 | 5 | 12 | 0 | 15 |
| Mike Szmatula | Dubuque Fighting Saints | 11 | 7 | 5 | 12 | +2 | 8 |
| Frank DiChiara | Dubuque Fighting Saints | 11 | 4 | 8 | 12 | +4 | 6 |
| Sam Anas | Youngstown Phantoms | 9 | 3 | 9 | 12 | -7 | 6 |
| Shane Sooth | Dubuque Fighting Saints | 11 | 2 | 10 | 12 | +2 | 0 |
| Gabe Guertler | Fargo Force | 13 | 6 | 4 | 10 | +3 | 21 |
| Brendan Harms | Fargo Force | 12 | 5 | 5 | 10 | +4 | 4 |
| Peter Quenneville | Dubuque Fighting Saints | 9 | 6 | 3 | 9 | +4 | 2 |

=== Leading goaltenders ===
Note: GP = Games played; MIN = Minutes played; W = Wins; L = Losses; SO = Shutouts; GA = Goals Allowed; GAA = Goals against average; SV% = Save percentage

| Player | Team | GP | MIN | W | L | SO | GA | GAA | SV% |
|---|---|---|---|---|---|---|---|---|---|
| Michael Bitzer | Lincoln Stars | 4 | 238:19 | 2 | 2 | 1 | 4 | 1.01 | 0.972 |
| Artt Brey | Dubuque Fighting Saints | 10 | 618:32 | 9 | 1 | 1 | 17 | 1.65 | 0.935 |
| Sean Romeo | Youngstown Phantoms | 9 | 534:46 | 5 | 4 | 0 | 21 | 2.36 | 0.905 |
| Cam Johnson | Fargo Force | 8 | 475:13 | 4 | 3 | 1 | 19 | 2.40 | 0.931 |
| Charlie Lindgren | Sioux Falls Stampede | 10 | 595:05 | 5 | 5 | 1 | 25 | 2.52 | 0.921 |

== USHL Awards ==
| Award | Name | Team |
|---|---|---|
| Rookie of the Year | Jake Guentzel | Sioux City Musketeers |
| Defenseman of the Year | Paul LaDue | Lincoln Stars |
| Forward of the Year | Taylor Cammarata | Waterloo Black Hawks |
| Goaltender of the Year | Kevin Lindskoug | Muskegon Lumberjacks |
| Player of the Year | Taylor Cammarata | Waterloo Black Hawks |
| Scholar-Athlete | Jake Horton; Tyler Moy | Waterloo Black Hawks; Omaha Lancers |
| Curt Hammer | Ryan Siiro | Sioux Falls Stampede |
| Coach of the Year | Cary Eades | Sioux Falls Stampede |
| General Manager of the Year | Jim Montgomery | Dubuque Fighting Saints |
| Executive of the Year | Dan Lehv | Dubuque Fighting Saints |
| Organization of the Year | | Fargo Force |

== All-USHL teams ==
=== First Team ===
| Position | Player | Team |
|---|---|---|
| Goalie | Kevin Lindskoug | Muskegon Lumberjacks |
| Defense | Paul LaDue | Lincoln Stars |
| Defense | Ian McCoshen | Waterloo Black Hawks |
| Forward | Taylor Cammarata | Waterloo Black Hawks |
| Forward | Justin Kloos | Waterloo Black Hawks |
| Forward | Mike Szmatula | Dubuque Fighting Saints |

=== Second Team ===
| Position | Player | Team |
|---|---|---|
| Goalie | Alex Lyon | Omaha Lancers |
| Defense | Michael Brodzinski | Muskegon Lumberjacks |
| Defense | Niklas Nevalainen | Dubuque Fighting Saints |
| Forward | Austin Cangelosi | Youngstown Phantoms |
| Forward | Jake Guentzel | Sioux City Musketeers |
| Forward | Kyle Novak | Green Bay Gamblers |
| Forward | Peter Quenneville | Dubuque Fighting Saints |
| Forward | Dominic Toninato | Fargo Force |

=== All-Rookie Team ===
| Position | Player | Team |
|---|---|---|
| Goalie | Cal Petersen | Waterloo Black Hawks |
| Defense | Gavin Bayreuther | Fargo Force |
| Defense | Michael Brondzinski | Muskegon Lumberjacks |
| Defense | Gustav Olofsson | Green Bay Gamblers |
| Forward | Jake Guentzel | Sioux City Musketeers |
| Forward | Tony Calderone | Sioux Falls Stampede |
| Forward | Vinni Lettieri | Lincoln Stars |
| Forward | Nick Schmaltz | Green Bay Gamblers |
