= Gavin Bayreuther =

American ice hockey player (born 1994)

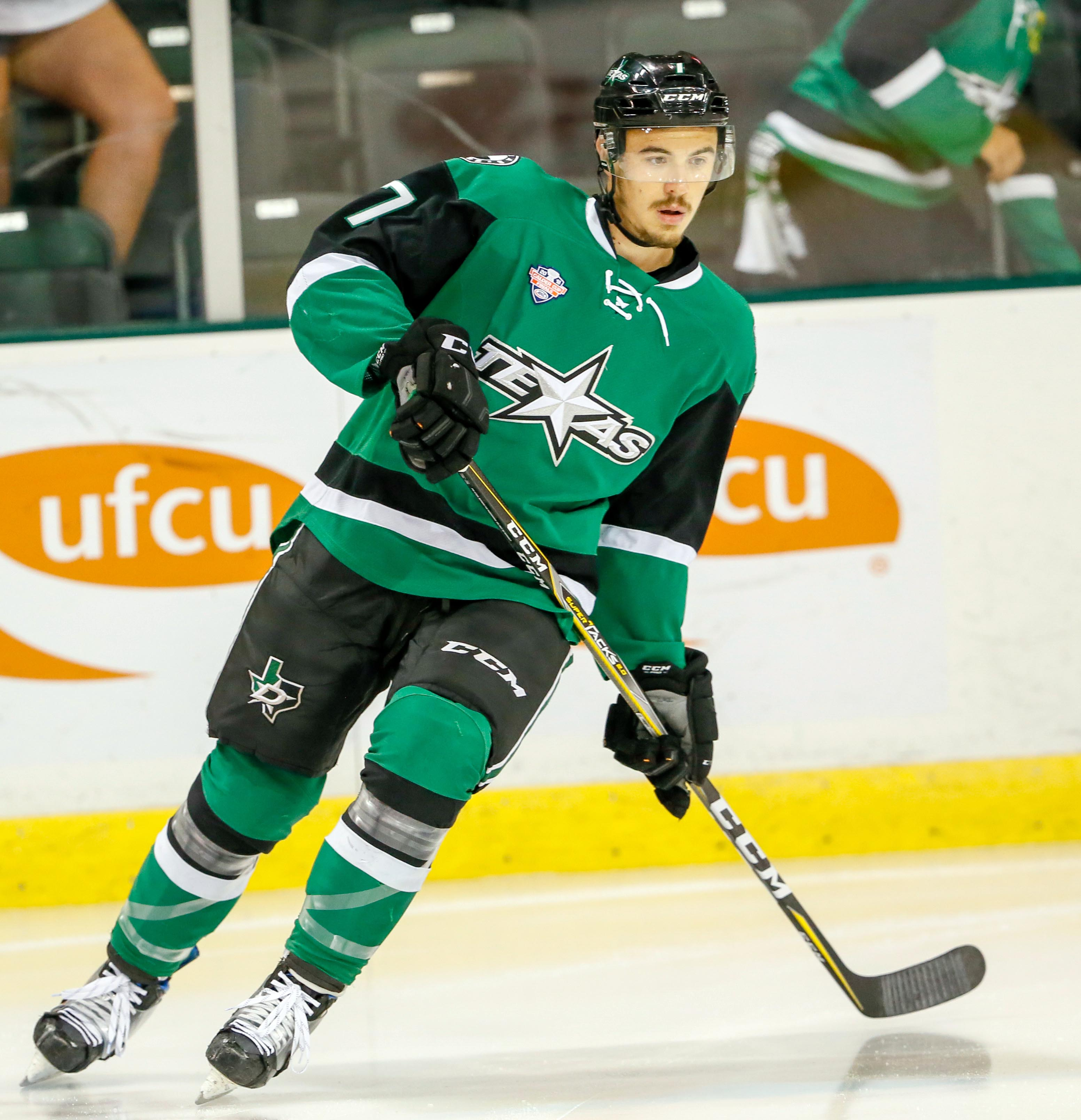
- Bayreuther with the Texas Stars in 2018
- Born: May 12, 1994 (age 32) Canaan, New Hampshire, U.S.
- Height: 6 ft 1 in (185 cm)
- Weight: 210 lb (95 kg; 15 st 0 lb)
- Position: Defense
- Shoots: Left
- NHL team Former teams: Free agent Dallas Stars; Columbus Blue Jackets; Lausanne HC
- NHL draft: Undrafted
- Playing career: 2016–present

Gavin Bayreuther (born May 12, 1994) is an American professional ice hockey defenseman who is currently an unrestricted free agent. He most recently played for the Rochester Americans of the American Hockey League (AHL) while under contract to the Buffalo Sabres of the National Hockey League (NHL).

Growing up in New Hampshire, Bayreuther started his hockey journey at the Holderness School, where he played until he leveled up to the Cedar Rapids RoughRiders of the United States Hockey League in 2012, who he played for until he was traded to the Fargo Force. In 2013, he joined St. Lawrence University, for whom he played for four years, collecting many accolades while doing so. In 2017, as an undrafted free agent, he signed with the NHL's Dallas Stars. He reached the Calder Cup Final with the team's American Hockey League affiliate, the Texas Stars, in 2018, and he made his NHL debut with Dallas later that same year. In 2020, as a free agent, he signed with the Columbus Blue Jackets. He played with them and their AHL affiliate, the Cleveland Monsters, until 2013, when he returned to the Texas Stars, signing with them for one year. After that, he signed in Switzerland with Lausanne HC of the National League. After one year with the team, in 2025, he returned to the NHL, signing with the Carolina Hurricanes. After playing with their AHL affiliate, the Chicago Wolves, he was traded to the Buffalo Sabres in early 2026.

== Early life ==
Bayreuther grew up in Canaan, New Hampshire, to parents John and Jessica. He has two younger brothers, Jack and Beckham, and a sister, Morgan. He attended a preparatory middle school, Cardigan Mountain School. As a child, he enjoyed playing lacrosse and soccer, alongside hockey. He himself said that instead of pursuing hockey, he was "almost 90 percent sure I was going to play lacrosse instead."

== Playing career ==
=== Junior ===
==== High school and major junior ====
Bayreuther began his hockey career at the preparatory Holderness School, located in Plymouth, New Hampshire. In his final season with the school, he recorded 34 points through 29 games. That year, 2012, he was named to the New Hampshire Prep School All-State Team. He was then ranked 186th overall by the NHL Central Scouting Bureau in their final rankings for the 2012 NHL entry draft. Bayreuther was not selected in the draft, but he was extended an offer by the St. Lawrence University Saints of the National Collegiate Athletic Association (NCAA)'s ECAC.

In the offseason, Bayreuther was selected 37th overall by the Cedar Rapids RoughRiders of the United States Hockey League (USHL) in the 2012 USHL entry draft. In his first game with the RoughRiders during the 2012–13 season, he scored two goals. Through his first eight games, he collected four goals and seven assists. After playing 19 games with the RoughRiders, on December 7, 2012, he was traded to the Fargo Force in exchange for Justin Wade. Six days later, he notched one goal and two assists in a 4–3 victory over Team USA. Bayreuther finished the regular season with a combined nine goals and 24 assists through 60 games between both teams, and he was named to the USHL All-Rookie Team.

==== Collegiate ====
Bayreuther then joined the Saints for the 2013–14 season. He scored his first goal with the Saints in the first game of the season, on October 11, 2013, in a 3–1 win over the Maine Black Bears. On February 7, 2014, he collected four assists as part of a 7–1 rout of the Princeton Tigers. By the end of the season with the program, he tallied nine goals and 27 assists, Saints records for a rookie defenseman, through 38 games, ranking third in scoring on the team. After the season, he was named to the ECAC All-Rookie Team and the ECAC Second All-Star Team. He was then named the ECAC Co-Rookie of the Year, sharing the honor with Sam Anas of the Quinnipiac Bobcats, as well as the Saints' rookie of the year. During the 2014–15 season, in the ECAC Semifinal on March 20, 2015, Bayreuther scored with 1:22 left in the third period to tie the game against Colgate Raiders 3–3. However, Colgate scored in overtime to win the game 4–3 and advance to the Final. Through 37 games that season, he managed six goals and 11 assists.

During the 2015–16 season, on March 12, 2016, in Game 2 of a three-game series against the Clarkson Golden Knights in the ECAC Quarterfinals, Bayreuther scored 3:14 into the second overtime, securing a 3–2 victory for the Saints. Six days later, against the Harvard Crimson in the ECAC Semifinals, he scored the only Saint goal in a 2–1 overtime loss. His performance landed him a spot on the ECAC All-Tournament Team. He was also named to the American Hockey Coaches Association (AHCA)'s AHCA East Second All-American Team as well as the ECAC First All-Star Team. He became the first defenseman to ever lead the team in scoring, with 12 goals and 17 assists for 29 points.

In the 2016–17 season, on November 12, 2016, Bayreuther scored the 32nd goal of his Saints career, setting the record for most goals with the program, as part of a 3–1 victory over the RPI Engineers. He finished his final season with the Saints with eight goals and 21 assists. After the collegiate season concluded, Bayreuther signed with the Dallas Stars on a two-year, entry-level contract as a free agent on March 14, 2017. The next day, he signed an amateur tryout offer with the team's American Hockey League (AHL) affiliate, the Texas Stars. On March 17, he was once again named to the ECAC First All-Star Team. That same day, in his first game with the Stars, Bayreuther scored his first professional goal. On April 7, he was named to the AHCA Second East All-American Team. He finished the season with the Stars collecting two goals and three assists through 15 games.

=== Professional ===
==== Dallas Stars ====
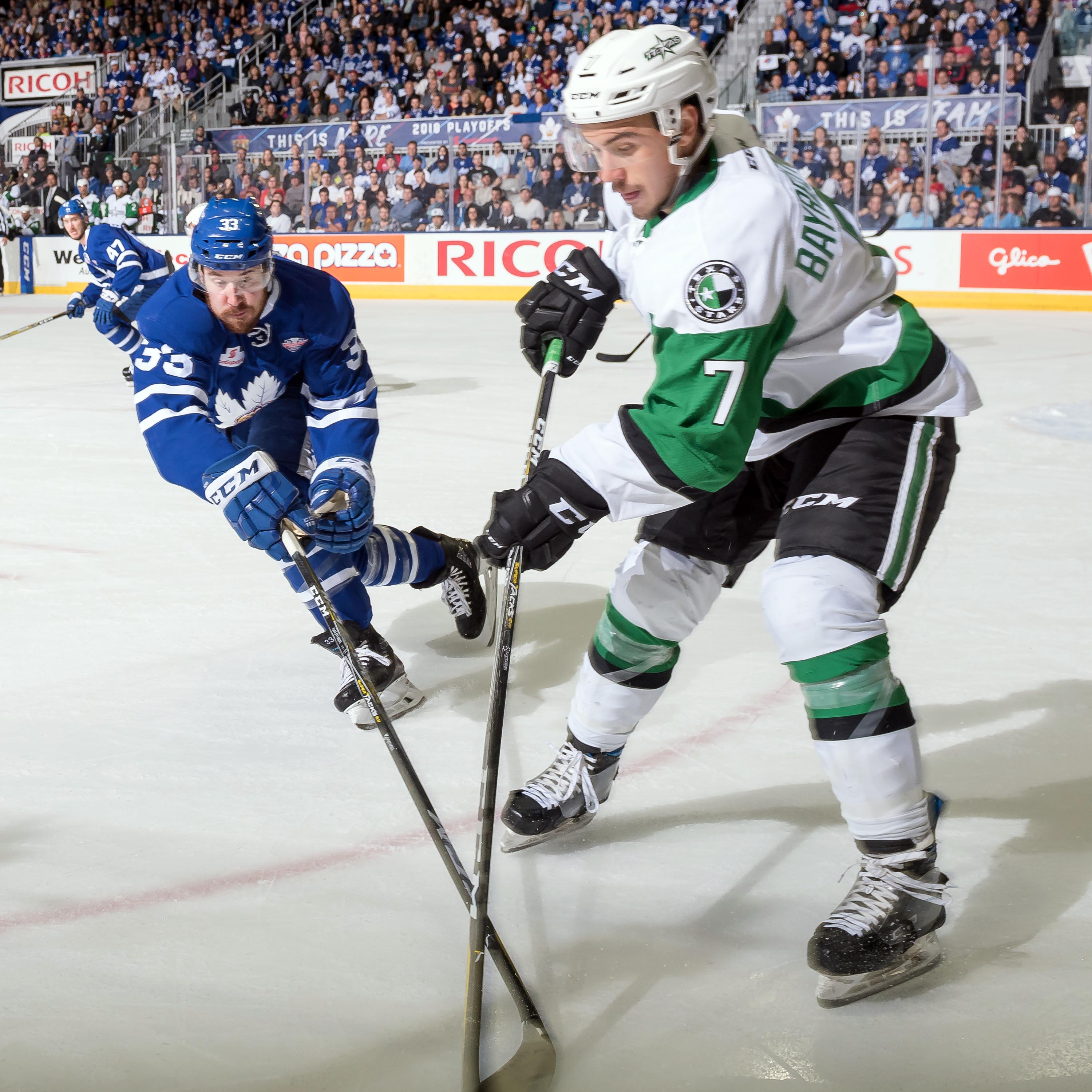
Bayreuther (right) with the Texas Stars during the 2018 Calder Cup Final

After attending the Dallas Stars' 2017 training camp, he was assigned to the Texas Stars on September 24 of that year. Before the start of the 2017–18 season, on October 5, he was named to the team's opening night roster. The next day, he played his first game of the season, a 6–5 victory over the Chicago Wolves. In his next game the next day, he put up one goal and two assists, contributing to another 6–5 victory over the Wolves. He ended the regular season collecting seven goals and 25 assists for 32 points in 71 games, leading the team's defensemen in assists and points. In the 2018 Calder Cup playoffs, the Stars advanced to the Calder Cup Final against the Toronto Marlies. In Game 2 of the series on June 2, 2018, Bayreuther scored the eventual game-winning goal in a 2–1 victory. The series reached Game 7, in which the Stars fell 6–1 to the Marlies. In 22 playoff games, Bayreuther collected three goals and five assists.

Bayreuther once again was named to the Texas Stars' opening roster before the 2018–19 season. After a few contests, he missed seven games due to a concussion, before he returned on November 10, 2018, scoring a goal in an 8–1 victory over the San Antonio Rampage. On November 10, after collecting two goals and three assists to start the season, he was called up to Dallas after Marc Methot was placed on injured reserve. The next day, he made his NHL debut in a 1–0 overtime victory over the Boston Bruins. On November 18, in a 6–2 win against the New York Islanders, he tallied his first NHL assist on a goal by Alexander Radulov. He recorded his first career NHL goal five days later, in a 6–4 win over the Ottawa Senators. After playing 19 games with Dallas, notching two goals and three assists, Bayreuther was reassigned to Texas on December 28. He ended the season with Texas recording seven goals and 18 assists through 53 games. On July 8, 2019, the Dallas Stars re-signed him to a one-year, entry-level contract.

In 11 games to start the 2019–20 season, Bayreuther tallied one goal and four assists before he was recalled to the Stars again on November 8, 2019. Three days later, he was returned to Texas. From November 23 to 30, he put up one goal and three assists as part of a three-game point streak. He managed those same numbers from February 8 to 14, 2020, in a four-game point streak. In 59 games during the season, he ended with six goals and 23 assists for 29 points. He led the team's defensemen in goals, tied for the lead in points, and placed second in assists.

==== Columbus Blue Jackets ====
On October 9, 2020, Bayreuther was signed as a free agent to a one-year, entry-level contract with the Columbus Blue Jackets. Prior to the 2020–21 season, on January 11, Bayreuther was placed on waivers for the purpose of being assigned to the Blue Jackets' AHL affiliate, the Cleveland Monsters, before participating in their training camp two weeks later. Bayreuther played two games with the Monsters before being recalled to the Blue Jackets on February 19, 2021. He remained on the Blue Jackets' taxi squad, taxi squads being a safety measure put in place due to the COVID-19 pandemic, until he was returned to the Monsters on February 26. In eight more games with the Monsters, he tallied one goal and nine assists before he was once again assigned to the Blue Jackets' taxi squad on April 10. Ten days later, he played his first game with the team in a 4–2 loss to the Florida Panthers, in which he was involved in his first NHL fight, against Sam Bennett. He scored his first goal with the Blue Jackets as part of a 5–2 loss to the Detroit Red Wings on May 7. The next day, he was reassigned to the Monsters after having totaled nine games with the Blue Jackets. He finished the season with the Monsters posting three goals and nine assists in 14 games. On July 21, Bayreuther was selected from the Blue Jackets at the 2021 NHL expansion draft by the Seattle Kraken. His tenure with the Kraken was short-lived, as he returned to the Blue Jackets soon after, signing a two-year contract with the team on July 28.

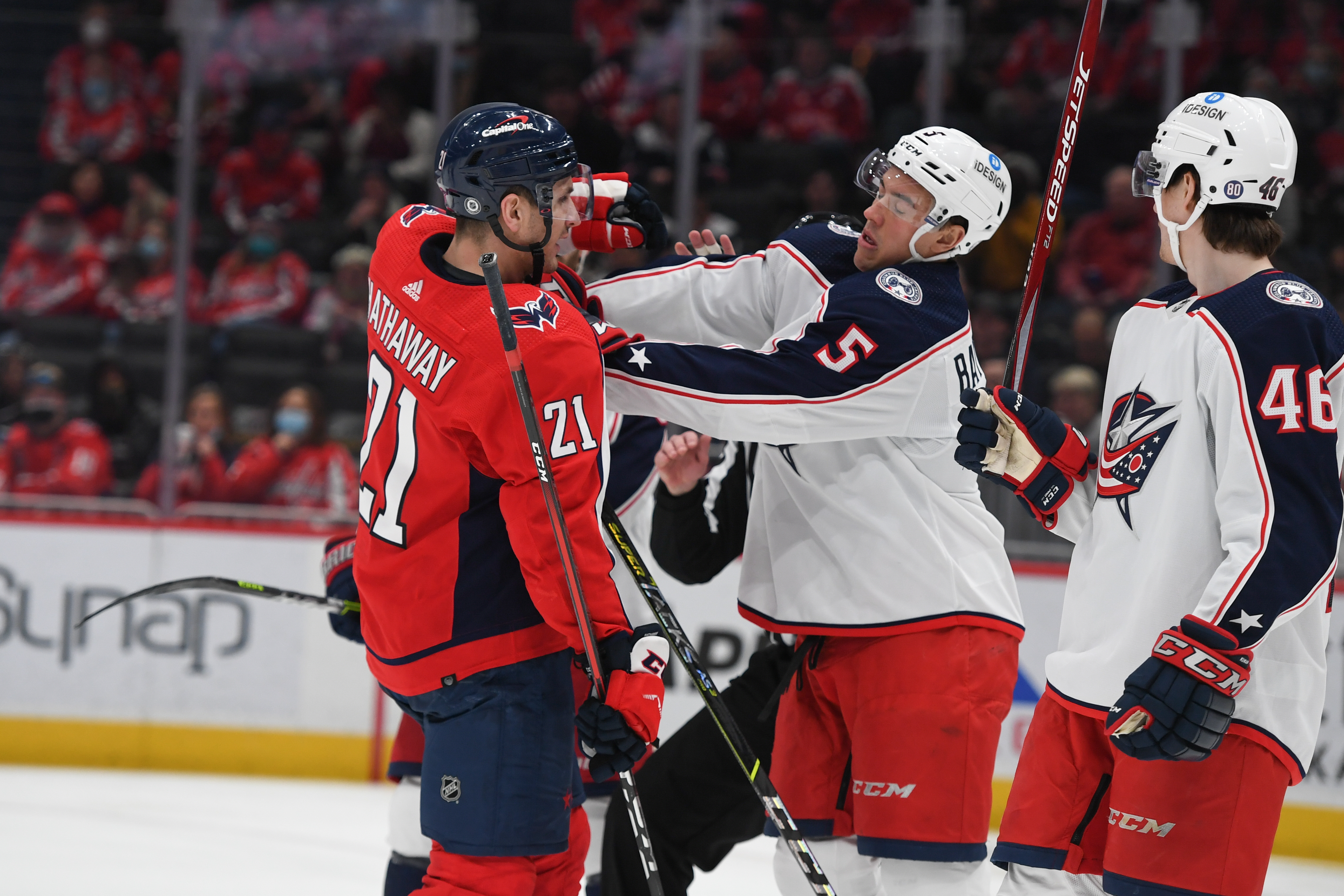
Bayreuther with the Blue Jackets in February 2022 putting his hands on Garnet Hathaway of the Washington Capitals

On October 5, 2021, Bayreuther cleared waivers and was assigned to the Monsters to attend their training camp prior to the 2021–22 season. Four days later, he was recalled by the Blue Jackets, and on October 8 and 9, he skated in preseason games with the team, before he was reassigned to the Monsters on October 10. After notching three assists in five games with the Monsters, he was once again recalled by the Blue Jackets on October 26. He played his first game of the season on November 3, in a 5–4 overtime loss to the Colorado Avalanche. On December 30, he tested positive for COVID-19 and was named to the NHL's COVID-19 protocol list. On February 20, 2022, he left a 4–3 win over the Buffalo Sabres in the third period due to an undisclosed injury. He finished the season with the Blue Jackets playing 43 games, managing eight assists.

On October 3, 2022, Bayreuther was once again placed on waivers by the Blue Jackets to be assigned to the Monsters' training camp before the 2022–23 season. Before the start of the season, he was named one of the Monsters' alternate captains. He tallied three assists in three games to start the season, before he was recalled to the Blue Jackets on October 24. He played only one game with the Blue Jackets before being reassigned to the Monsters on November 4. He played in one more game with the Monsters to total four assists with the team that season before he was recalled to the Blue Jackets again on November 11. In 51 games with the Blue Jackets, he set many career highs, achieving two goals and 12 assists for 14 points.

==== Return to Dallas, Lausanne HC, Carolina Hurricanes, and Buffalo Sabres ====
On July 2, 2023, Bayreuther signed a one-year, US$750,000 contract to return to the Dallas Stars. On October 2, after attending the team's training camp, he was placed on waivers by Dallas for the purpose of being assigned to the Texas Stars for the 2023–24 season. On October 13, in the team's season opener, a 3–2 loss to the Tucson Roadrunners, Bayreuther fell on his ankle and injured it in the third period. Four days later, it was announced that the injury would cause him to miss most of the season. He returned to the lineup on March 8 in a 2–1 loss to the San Jose Barracuda. The next day, he recorded three assists in a 6–3 victory over the same team. He finished the season having only 17 games played, collecting seven assists. During the 2024 Calder Cup playoffs, in seven games, he managed two assists.

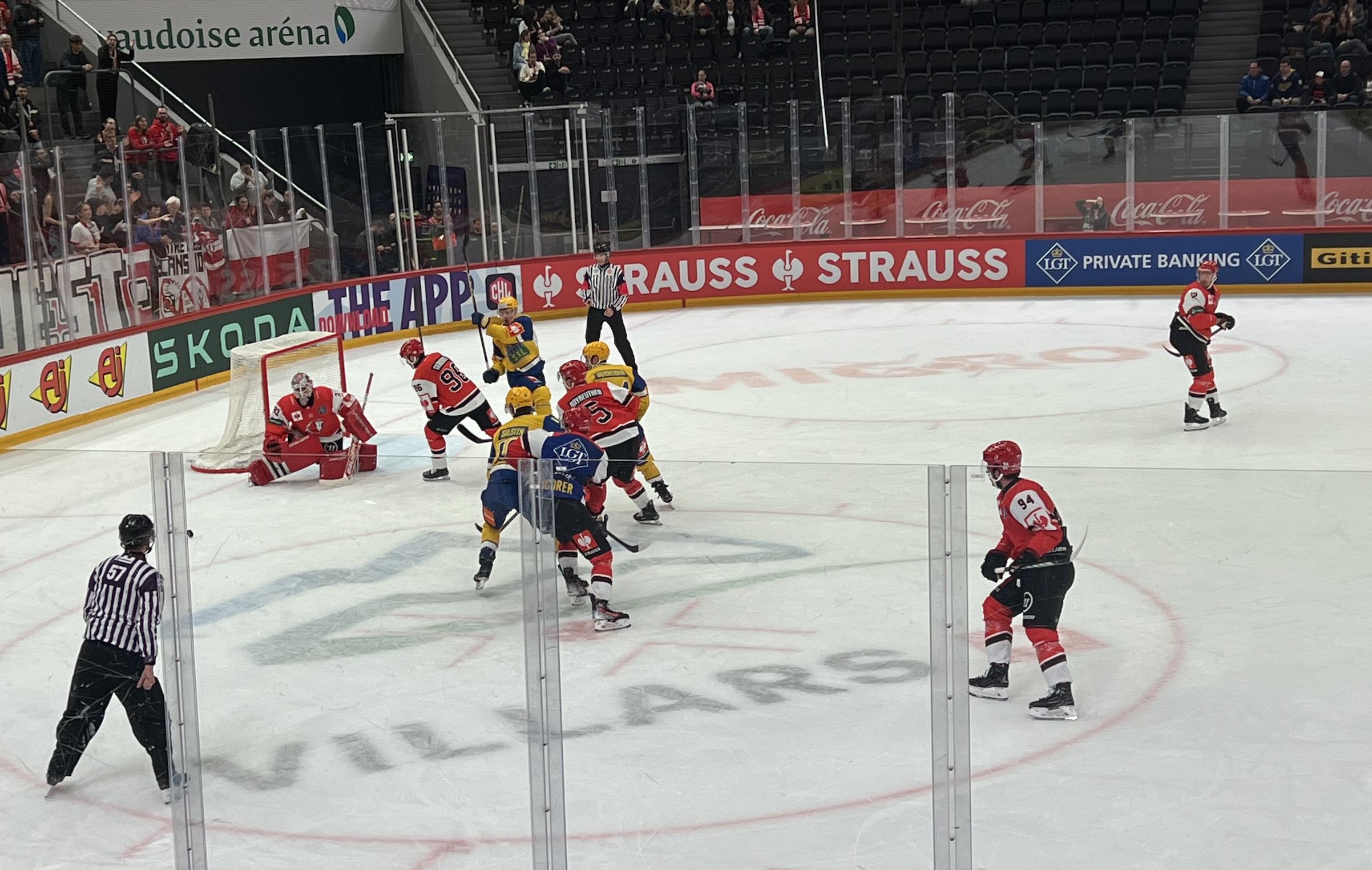
Bayreuther (red jersey, number 5) with Lausanne in October 2024 in a game against Norwegian team Storhamar

As a free agent, Bayreuther signed his first contract abroad, agreeing to a one-year deal with Lausanne HC of the Swiss National League on July 30, 2024. He finished the 2024–25 season with five goals and 18 assists for 23 points in 52 games. His goal total ranked first on the team, and his assists and points each ranked second. In 18 playoff games with the team, Bayreuther managed two goals and six assists.

On July 12, 2025, Bayreuther signed a one-year, entry-level contract with the Carolina Hurricanes. He was placed on waivers by the Hurricanes for the purpose of being reassigned to their AHL affiliate, the Chicago Wolves, on September 30. After registering four goals and nine assists through 33 games with the Wolves, he was traded to the Buffalo Sabres on January 24, 2026. He was then assigned to their AHL affiliate, the Rochester Americans.

== Career statistics ==
| | | | Regular season | | | | | Playoffs |
| Season | Team | League | GP | G | A | Pts | PIM | GP | G | A | Pts | PIM |
|---|---|---|---|---|---|---|---|---|---|---|---|---|
| 2009–10 | Holderness School | HS-Prep | 26 | 3 | 4 | 7 | — | — | — | — | — | — |
| 2010–11 | Holderness School | HS-Prep | 28 | 7 | 6 | 13 | 12 | — | — | — | — | — |
| 2011–12 | Holderness School | HS-Prep | 29 | 14 | 20 | 34 | 36 | — | — | — | — | — |
| 2012–13 | Cedar Rapids RoughRiders | USHL | 19 | 4 | 8 | 12 | 15 | — | — | — | — | — |
| 2012–13 | Fargo Force | USHL | 41 | 5 | 16 | 21 | 28 | 13 | 2 | 1 | 3 | 14 |
| 2013–14 | St. Lawrence University | ECAC | 38 | 9 | 27 | 36 | 20 | — | — | — | — | — |
| 2014–15 | St. Lawrence University | ECAC | 37 | 6 | 11 | 17 | 22 | — | — | — | — | — |
| 2015–16 | St. Lawrence University | ECAC | 37 | 12 | 17 | 29 | 26 | — | — | — | — | — |
| 2016–17 | St. Lawrence University | ECAC | 30 | 8 | 21 | 29 | 24 | — | — | — | — | — |
| 2016–17 | Texas Stars | AHL | 15 | 2 | 3 | 5 | 6 | — | — | — | — | — |
| 2017–18 | Texas Stars | AHL | 71 | 7 | 25 | 32 | 28 | 22 | 3 | 5 | 8 | 6 |
| 2018–19 | Texas Stars | AHL | 53 | 7 | 18 | 25 | 18 | — | — | — | — | — |
| 2018–19 | Dallas Stars | NHL | 19 | 2 | 3 | 5 | 10 | — | — | — | — | — |
| 2019–20 | Texas Stars | AHL | 59 | 6 | 23 | 29 | 28 | — | — | — | — | — |
| 2020–21 | Cleveland Monsters | AHL | 14 | 3 | 9 | 12 | 18 | — | — | — | — | — |
| 2020–21 | Columbus Blue Jackets | NHL | 9 | 1 | 0 | 1 | 7 | — | — | — | — | — |
| 2021–22 | Cleveland Monsters | AHL | 5 | 0 | 3 | 3 | 20 | — | — | — | — | — |
| 2021–22 | Columbus Blue Jackets | NHL | 43 | 0 | 8 | 8 | 22 | — | — | — | — | — |
| 2022–23 | Cleveland Monsters | AHL | 4 | 0 | 4 | 4 | 2 | — | — | — | — | — |
| 2022–23 | Columbus Blue Jackets | NHL | 51 | 2 | 12 | 14 | 23 | — | — | — | — | — |
| 2023–24 | Texas Stars | AHL | 17 | 0 | 7 | 7 | 18 | 7 | 0 | 2 | 2 | 4 |
| 2024–25 | Lausanne HC | NL | 52 | 5 | 18 | 23 | 47 | 18 | 2 | 6 | 8 | 16 |
| 2025–26 | Chicago Wolves | AHL | 33 | 4 | 9 | 13 | 22 | — | — | — | — | — |
| 2025–26 | Rochester Americans | AHL | 30 | 1 | 11 | 12 | 19 | 3 | 0 | 0 | 0 | 4 |
| NHL totals | | | 122 | 5 | 23 | 28 | 62 | — | — | — | — | — |

== Awards and honors ==
| Award | Year |
USHL
| USHL All-Rookie Team | 2013 |
College
| ECAC Rookie of the Year | 2014 |
| ECAC All-Rookie Team | 2014 |
| ECAC Second All-Star Team | 2014 |
| ECAC All-Tournament Team | 2016 |
| ECAC First All-Star Team | 2016, 2017 |
| NCAA Second All-American Team | 2016, 2017 |

Awards and achievements
| Preceded by Jason Kasdorf | ECAC Hockey Rookie of the Year (co-winner with Sam Anas); 2013–14 | Succeeded by Kyle Hayton |
