= Alex Iafallo =

American ice hockey player (born 1993)

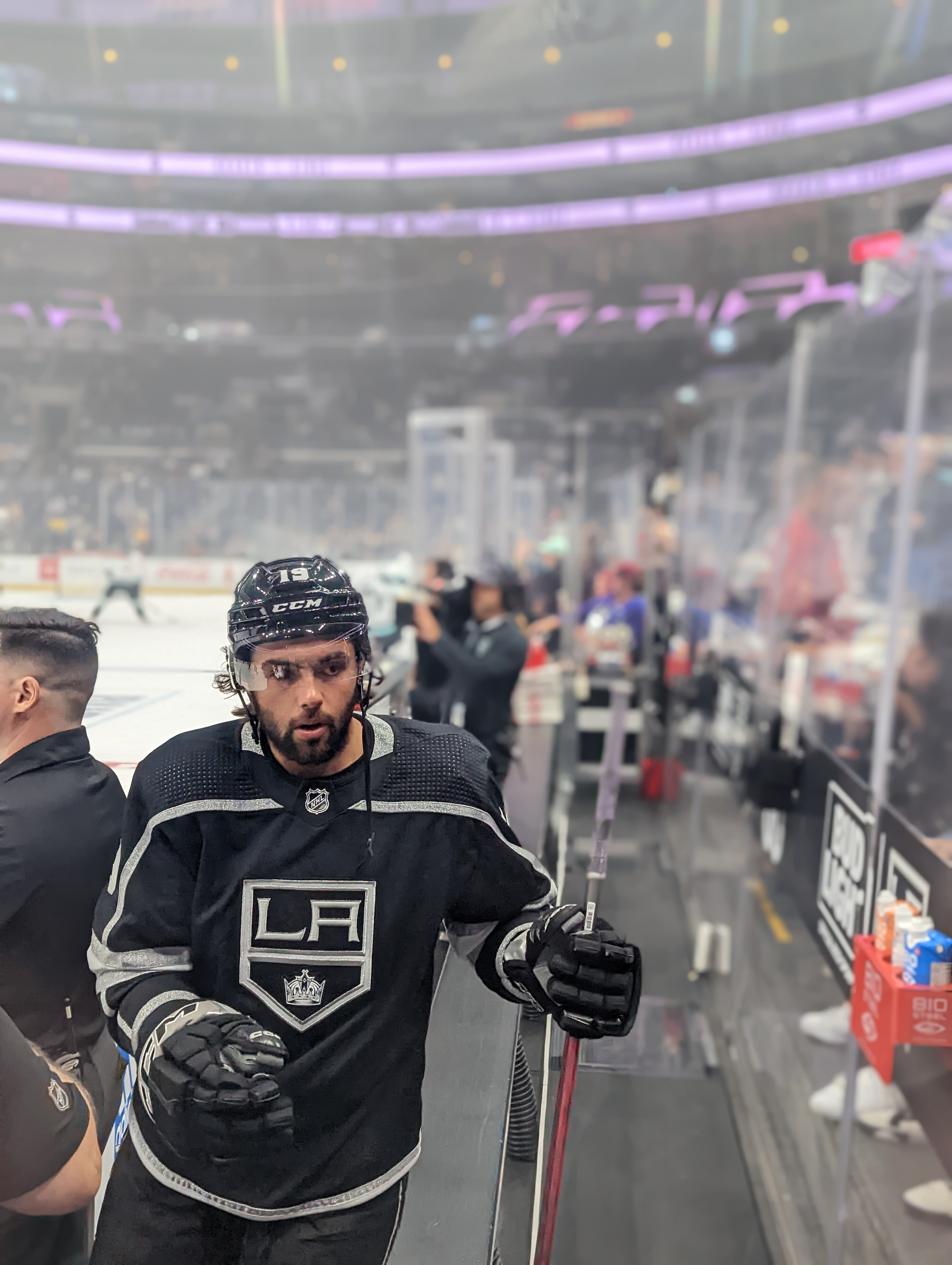
- Iafallo with the Los Angeles Kings in 2022
- Born: December 21, 1993 (age 32) Eden, New York, U.S.
- Height: 6 ft 0 in (183 cm)
- Weight: 185 lb (84 kg; 13 st 3 lb)
- Position: Forward
- Shoots: Left
- NHL team Former teams: Winnipeg Jets; Los Angeles Kings
- NHL draft: Undrafted
- Playing career: 2017–present

Alexander Iafallo (born December 21, 1993) is an American professional ice hockey player who is a forward for the Winnipeg Jets of the National Hockey League (NHL). He has also played for the Los Angeles Kings.

== Early life ==
Iafallo was born on December 21, 1993, in Eden, New York, to father Tom and nurse Barb Iafallo. At the age of four, Iafallo began skating but was held back from joining the local mite travel team for a year per his parents' request. His father Tom, a restaurant owner and a coach, built a roller rink in their backyard for Iafallo and his sister Julianna to practice on. Julianna is also a former professional hockey player. She played for the Buffalo Beauts in the National Women's Hockey League.

== Playing career ==
=== Youth ===
Growing up in Eden, New York, Iafallo played junior hockey for the Buffalo Regals 18U team while his sister competed with the Buffalo Bisons. He also competed with the Western Region men's scholastic ice hockey team at the 2010 Empire State Games where he helped the team win a gold medal. As the top scorer for the Regals during the 2010–11 Tier 1 AAA season, Iafallo helped guide the team towards a national championship. He would leave the team after that season to play junior hockey with the Fargo Force in the United States Hockey League (USHL) before embarking on a collegiate career with the University of Minnesota Duluth of the National Collegiate Hockey Conference.

=== Collegiate ===
In his freshman season at the University of Minnesota Duluth, Iafallo played in 33 games and was named to the NCHC All-Rookie Team.

Undrafted, Iafallo registered a team leading 21 goals, 30 assists and 51 points as a senior in the 2016–17 season. He was named a First Team All–American and MVP of the NCHC All-Tournament Team. Having recorded 121 points in 152 games over the course of his four-year tenure with the Bulldogs, Iafallo was signed as a free agent to a two-year, entry-level contract with the Los Angeles Kings on April 19, 2017.

=== Professional ===
==== Los Angeles Kings ====
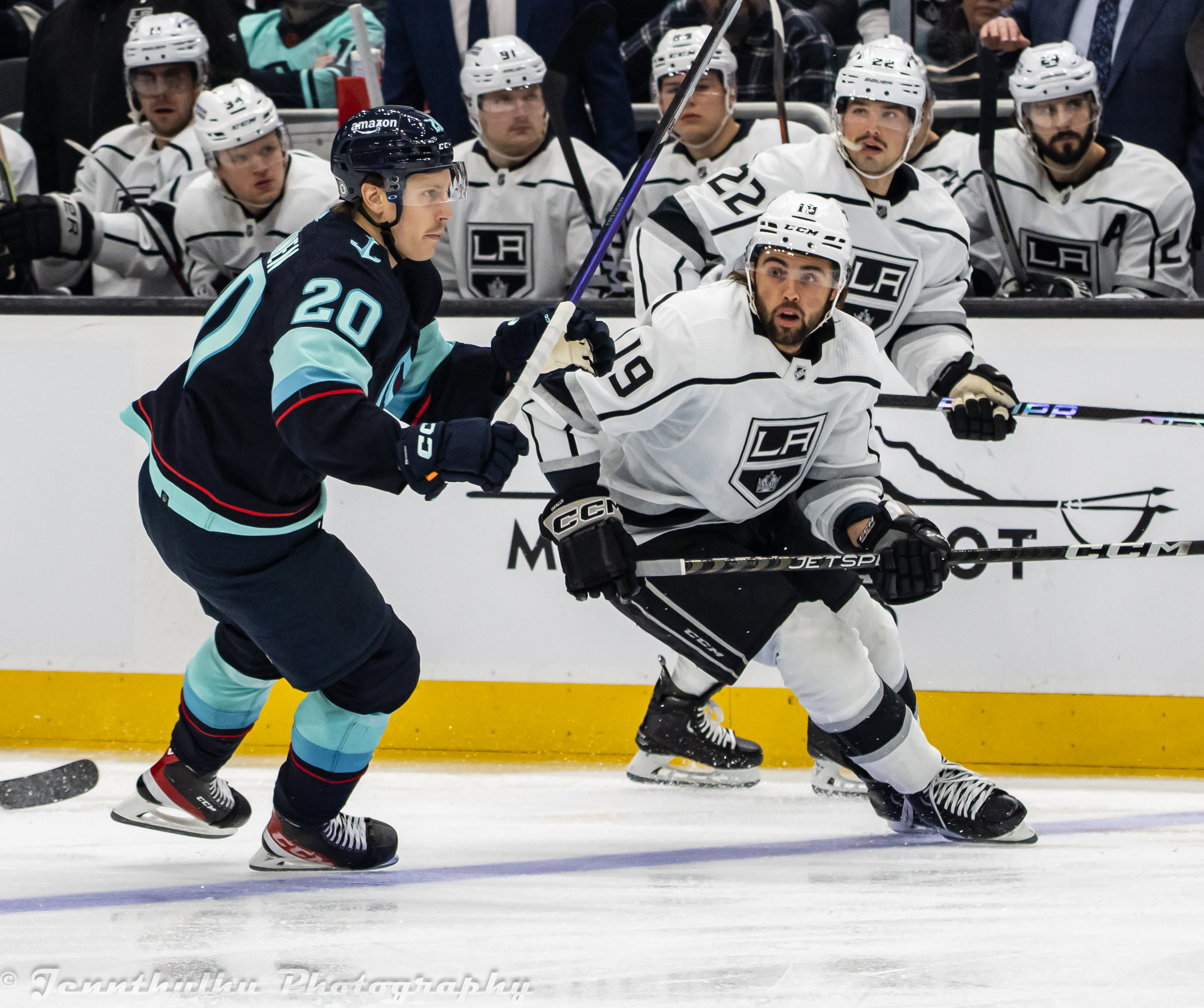
Iafallo in a 2023 game against the Seattle Kraken.

Having impressed throughout the Kings rookie and main roster training camp, Iafallo made the opening night roster for the 2017–18 season. He stepped straight into the NHL in making his debut for the Kings in a 2–0 victory over the Philadelphia Flyers on October 5, 2017. He scored his first NHL goal on November 5, 2017, in his 14th career game, against the Nashville Predators. This helped erase a three-goal deficit but the Predators won in overtime, 4–3. He would score 9 goals that season and 15 the following season.

On January 30, 2020, Iafallo recorded his first career hat trick in a 3–2 win over the Arizona Coyotes. He became the third player in NHL history to score within the opening 25 seconds of an overtime period multiple times in a single season. He scored 17 goals in the 2019-20 season and was on pace for his first 20-goal, 50 point season before COVID-19 shut down the NHL

On April 12, 2021, Iafallo signed a four-year, $16 million contract extension with the Kings. He finished the season with 13 goals in the shortened 56-game season, of which he played 55 games.

On May 7, 2021, Iafallo wore a letter on his jersey for the first time, serving as an Alternate captain after Dustin Brown was ruled out for the rest of the season with an injury.

He would become an alternate captain again in the 2021–22 season on two occasions. Following an injury to Drew Doughty, Iafallo temporarily wore an “A” on his jersey. He would return the title to Doughty after his return in late November. When Doughty got injured again in mid-March 2022, Iafallo would once again wear an “A”.

Iafallo missed 23 games in the 2022–23 season due to a lower body injury, but still managed to finish with 14 goals and 36 points in 59 games. He scored his first playoff overtime goal on April 17, 2023, in game 1 of the Kings’ first round series against the Edmonton Oilers.

==== Winnipeg Jets ====
On June 27, 2023, Iafallo was traded by the Kings, alongside Rasmus Kupari, Gabriel Vilardi and a 2024 2nd-round draft pick to the Winnipeg Jets in exchange for Pierre-Luc Dubois.

== Career statistics ==
| | | | Regular season | | | | | Playoffs |
| Season | Team | League | GP | G | A | Pts | PIM | GP | G | A | Pts | PIM |
|---|---|---|---|---|---|---|---|---|---|---|---|---|
| 2010–11 | Buffalo Regals 18U AAA | T1EHL | 39 | 15 | 21 | 36 | 27 | — | — | — | — | — |
| 2011–12 | Fargo Force | USHL | 58 | 17 | 15 | 32 | 8 | 6 | 2 | 2 | 4 | 2 |
| 2012–13 | Fargo Force | USHL | 50 | 20 | 23 | 43 | 15 | 13 | 6 | 10 | 16 | 4 |
| 2013–14 | University of Minnesota Duluth | NCHC | 36 | 11 | 11 | 22 | 10 | — | — | — | — | — |
| 2014–15 | University of Minnesota Duluth | NCHC | 34 | 8 | 17 | 25 | 12 | — | — | — | — | — |
| 2015–16 | University of Minnesota Duluth | NCHC | 40 | 8 | 15 | 23 | 8 | — | — | — | — | — |
| 2016–17 | University of Minnesota Duluth | NCHC | 42 | 21 | 30 | 51 | 22 | — | — | — | — | — |
| 2017–18 | Los Angeles Kings | NHL | 75 | 9 | 16 | 25 | 12 | 3 | 1 | 0 | 1 | 0 |
| 2018–19 | Los Angeles Kings | NHL | 82 | 15 | 18 | 33 | 22 | — | — | — | — | — |
| 2019–20 | Los Angeles Kings | NHL | 70 | 17 | 26 | 43 | 14 | — | — | — | — | — |
| 2020–21 | Los Angeles Kings | NHL | 55 | 13 | 17 | 30 | 4 | — | — | — | — | — |
| 2021–22 | Los Angeles Kings | NHL | 79 | 17 | 20 | 37 | 8 | 7 | 1 | 3 | 4 | 4 |
| 2022–23 | Los Angeles Kings | NHL | 59 | 14 | 22 | 36 | 20 | 6 | 3 | 1 | 4 | 6 |
| 2023–24 | Winnipeg Jets | NHL | 82 | 11 | 16 | 27 | 6 | 5 | 0 | 1 | 1 | 0 |
| 2024–25 | Winnipeg Jets | NHL | 82 | 15 | 16 | 31 | 15 | 13 | 1 | 1 | 2 | 10 |
| 2025–26 | Winnipeg Jets | NHL | 79 | 13 | 16 | 29 | 14 | — | — | — | — | — |
| NHL totals | | | 663 | 124 | 167 | 291 | 115 | 34 | 6 | 6 | 12 | 20 |

== Awards and honors ==
| Award | Year | Ref |
College
| NCHC All-Rookie Team | 2014 | |
| NCHC All-Tournament Team | 2017 | |
| NCHC First All-Star Team | 2017 | |
| West First All-Star Team | 2017 | |
| NCAA All-Tournament Team | 2017 | |
| First Team All–American | 2017 | |

Awards and achievements
| Preceded by Mikey Eyssimont | NCHC Tournament MVP; 2017 | Succeeded by Tanner Jaillet |
