= Charlie Lindgren =

American ice hockey player (born 1993)

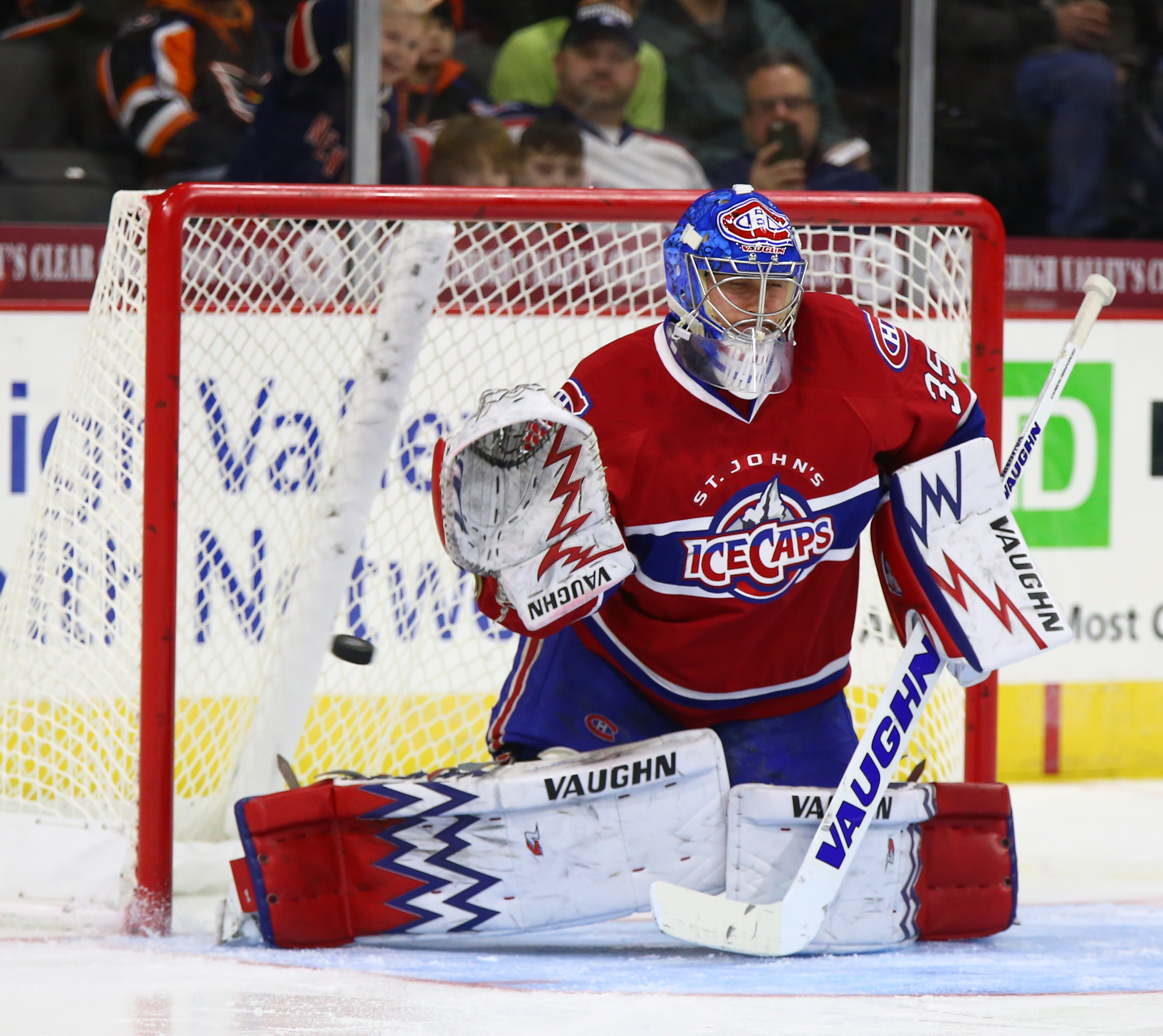
- Lindgren with the St. John's IceCaps in 2017
- Born: December 18, 1993 (age 32) Lakeville, Minnesota, U.S.
- Height: 6 ft 1 in (185 cm)
- Weight: 186 lb (84 kg; 13 st 4 lb)
- Position: Goaltender
- Catches: Right
- NHL team Former teams: Washington Capitals; Montreal Canadiens; St. Louis Blues
- National team: United States
- NHL draft: Undrafted
- Playing career: 2016–present

Charles Lindgren (born December 18, 1993) is an American professional ice hockey player who is a goaltender for the Washington Capitals of the National Hockey League (NHL). Originally undrafted by teams in the NHL, Lindgren has also previously played for the Montreal Canadiens and St. Louis Blues.

== Playing career ==
Lindgren began his junior career with the Sioux Falls Stampede of the United States Hockey League (USHL) in 2012–13. He then played collegiately at St. Cloud State of the National Collegiate Athletic Association (NCAA) from 2013–16. On March 30, 2016, Lindgren decided to forego his senior year at St. Cloud State, and was signed as a free agent by the Montreal Canadiens to a two-year, two-way contract.

At the tail end of the 2015–16 season, Lindgren played in his first NHL game on April 7, 2016. The Canadiens won the game 4–2 against the Carolina Hurricanes.

On November 5, 2017, Lindgren registered his first career shutout against the Chicago Blackhawks in a 2–0 win, making 38 total saves. He was the starting goalie of this game due to an injury to Carey Price. On February 13, 2018, the Canadiens signed Lindgren to a three-year, $2.25 million contract extension.

On July 29, 2021, the St. Louis Blues signed Lindgren as a free agent to a one-year, two-way contract. He was assigned to their American Hockey League (AHL) affiliate, the Springfield Thunderbirds, to begin the 2021–22 season. He was later recalled and made his debut for the Blues on December 7, 2021, when Blues goaltender Ville Husso was injured late in the third period in a game against the Florida Panthers. Entering with the score tied at 3–3, Lindgren was credited with the win, having played six minutes and faced three Panther shots before the Blues won in overtime, 4–3.

On July 13, 2022, Lindgren was signed as a free agent to a three-year, $3.3 million contract with the Washington Capitals. On November 14, 2023, Lindgren posted his first shutout with Washington against the Vegas Golden Knights, making 35 saves in a 3–0 win. Towards the end of the season, his goaltending improved significantly to the point where he superseded ex-Avalanche goaltender Darcy Kuemper for the role of starting goaltender, eventually backstopping the team to take the last available playoff spot in the Eastern Conference by winning the final three regular season games, in which Lindgren posted a stellar .962 save percentage.

On March 3, 2025, Lindgren signed a three-year, $9 million contract extension with the Capitals, keeping him with the team through the 2027-28 season.

== Personal life ==
His younger brother, Ryan, is a defenseman for the Seattle Kraken.

== Career statistics ==
=== Regular season and playoffs ===
| | | | Regular season | | | | | | | | | Playoffs |
| Season | Team | League | GP | W | L | T/OT | MIN | GA | SO | GAA | SV% | GP | W | L | MIN | GA | SO | GAA | SV% |
|---|---|---|---|---|---|---|---|---|---|---|---|---|---|---|---|---|---|---|---|
| 2009–10 | Lakeville North High | SSC | 15 | — | — | — | — | — | — | 3.13 | .877 | 2 | — | — | — | — | — | 1.04 | .967 |
| 2010–11 | Lakeville North High | SSC | 18 | — | — | — | — | — | — | 3.30 | .905 | 3 | — | — | — | — | — | 0.57 | .978 |
| 2011–12 | Sioux Falls Stampede | USHL | 33 | 9 | 19 | 3 | 1821 | 101 | 0 | 3.33 | .907 | — | — | — | — | — | — | — | — |
| 2012–13 | Sioux Falls Stampede | USHL | 52 | 35 | 14 | 2 | 2853 | 133 | 2 | 2.80 | .900 | 10 | 5 | 5 | 595 | 25 | 1 | 2.52 | .921 |
| 2013–14 | St. Cloud State | NCHC | 10 | 2 | 2 | 1 | 322 | 13 | 1 | 2.42 | .905 | — | — | — | — | — | — | — | — |
| 2014–15 | St. Cloud State | NCHC | 38 | 19 | 18 | 1 | 2226 | 84 | 2 | 2.26 | .919 | — | — | — | — | — | — | — | — |
| 2015–16 | St. Cloud State | NCHC | 40 | 30 | 9 | 1 | 2343 | 83 | 5 | 2.13 | .925 | — | — | — | — | — | — | — | — |
| 2015–16 | Montreal Canadiens | NHL | 1 | 1 | 0 | 0 | 60 | 2 | 0 | 2.00 | .929 | — | — | — | — | — | — | — | — |
| 2016–17 | St. John's IceCaps | AHL | 48 | 24 | 18 | 6 | 2859 | 122 | 5 | 2.56 | .914 | 4 | 1 | 3 | 272 | 10 | 0 | 2.21 | .922 |
| 2016–17 | Montreal Canadiens | NHL | 2 | 2 | 0 | 0 | 122 | 3 | 0 | 1.48 | .949 | — | — | — | — | — | — | — | — |
| 2017–18 | Laval Rocket | AHL | 37 | 8 | 19 | 9 | 2161 | 122 | 2 | 3.39 | .886 | — | — | — | — | — | — | — | — |
| 2017–18 | Montreal Canadiens | NHL | 14 | 4 | 8 | 2 | 833 | 42 | 2 | 3.03 | .908 | — | — | — | — | — | — | — | — |
| 2018–19 | Laval Rocket | AHL | 33 | 11 | 14 | 6 | 1859 | 91 | 0 | 2.94 | .884 | — | — | — | — | — | — | — | — |
| 2018–19 | Montreal Canadiens | NHL | 1 | 1 | 0 | 0 | 65 | 5 | 0 | 4.62 | .898 | — | — | — | — | — | — | — | — |
| 2019–20 | Laval Rocket | AHL | 16 | 7 | 6 | 2 | 923 | 41 | 1 | 2.67 | .893 | — | — | — | — | — | — | — | — |
| 2019–20 | Montreal Canadiens | NHL | 6 | 2 | 4 | 0 | 361 | 20 | 0 | 3.33 | .888 | — | — | — | — | — | — | — | — |
| 2020–21 | Laval Rocket | AHL | 3 | 2 | 1 | 0 | 180 | 7 | 0 | 2.34 | .887 | — | — | — | — | — | — | — | — |
| 2021–22 | Springfield Thunderbirds | AHL | 34 | 24 | 7 | 1 | 1979 | 73 | 3 | 2.21 | .925 | 8 | 5 | 3 | 495 | 23 | 1 | 2.79 | .914 |
| 2021–22 | St. Louis Blues | NHL | 5 | 5 | 0 | 0 | 247 | 5 | 0 | 1.22 | .958 | — | — | — | — | — | — | — | — |
| 2022–23 | Washington Capitals | NHL | 31 | 13 | 11 | 3 | 1693 | 86 | 0 | 3.05 | .899 | — | — | — | — | — | — | — | — |
| 2023–24 | Washington Capitals | NHL | 50 | 25 | 16 | 7 | 2852 | 127 | 6 | 2.67 | .911 | 4 | 0 | 4 | 235 | 14 | 0 | 3.58 | .864 |
| 2024–25 | Washington Capitals | NHL | 39 | 20 | 14 | 3 | 2287 | 102 | 1 | 2.68 | .896 | 1 | 0 | 0 | 7 | 1 | 0 | 9.07 | .800 |
| 2025–26 | Washington Capitals | NHL | 21 | 9 | 8 | 3 | 1246 | 73 | 1 | 3.52 | .879 | — | — | — | — | — | — | — | — |
| NHL totals | | | 170 | 82 | 61 | 18 | 9,764 | 465 | 10 | 2.87 | .902 | 5 | 0 | 4 | 241 | 15 | 0 | 3.73 | .861 |

=== International ===
| Year | Team | Event | Result | GP | W | L | T | MIN | GA | SO | GAA | SV% |
|---|---|---|---|---|---|---|---|---|---|---|---|---|
| 2024 | United States | WC | 5th | 2 | 1 | 1 | 0 | 118 | 4 | 0 | 2.03 | .931 |
| Senior totals | | | | 2 | 1 | 1 | 0 | 118 | 4 | 0 | 2.03 | .931 |

== Awards and honors ==
| Award | Year | Ref |
USHL
| Dave Peterson Goalie of the Year | 2013 | |
| USHL/NHL Top Prospects Game | 2013 | |
College
| NCHC All-Rookie Team | 2014 | |
| NCHC Honorable Mention All-Star Team | 2015 | |
| NCHC All-Tournament Team | 2015, 2016 | |
| NCHC First All-Star Team | 2016 | |
| NCHC Goaltender of the Year | 2016 | |
| AHCA West First Team All-American | 2016 | |
| NCHC All-Decade Second Team | 2023 | |
AHL
| All-Star Game | 2017 | |

Awards and achievements
| Preceded by Zane McIntyre | NCHC Goaltender of the Year; 2015–16 | Succeeded by Tanner Jaillet |
