= Sam Anas =

American ice hockey player (born 1993)

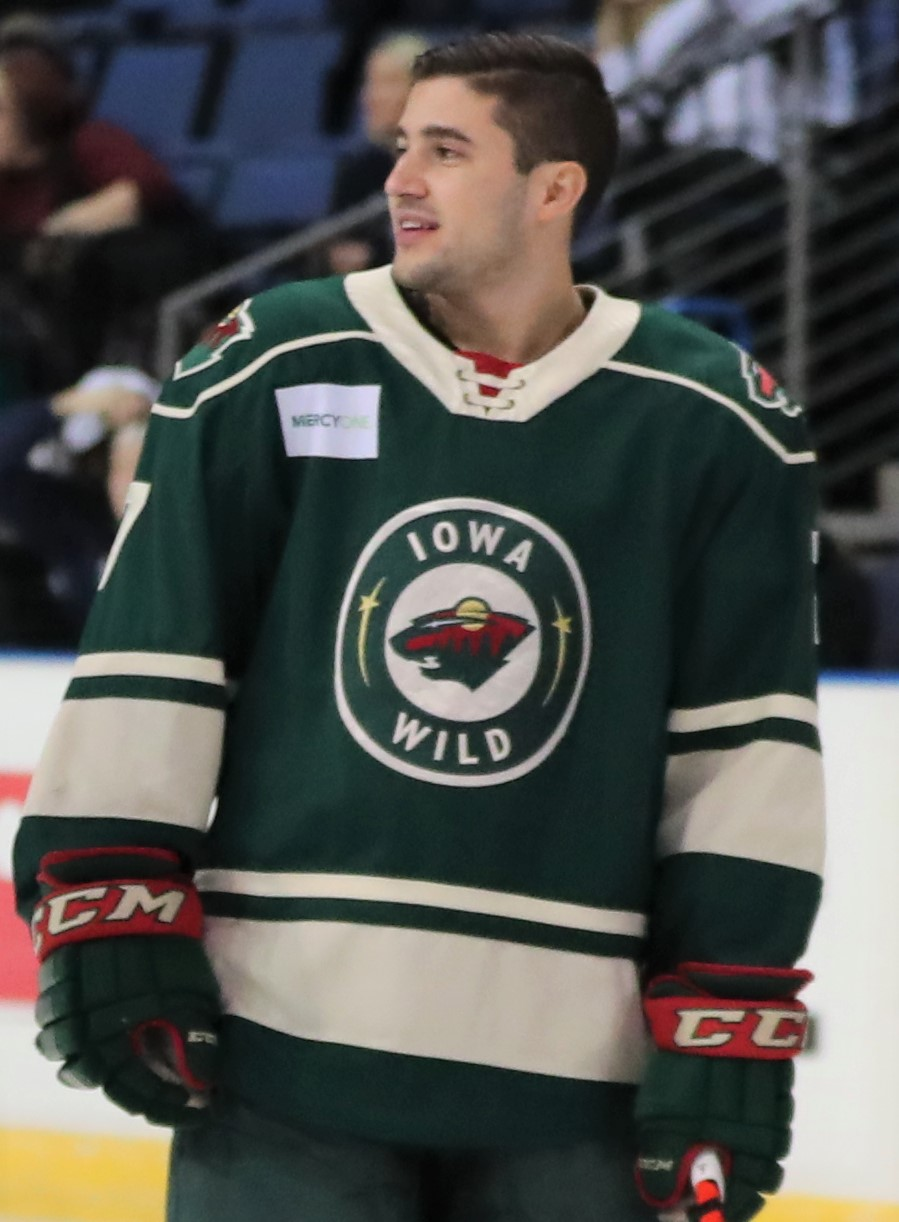
- Anas with the Iowa Wild in 2020
- Born: June 1, 1993 (age 33) Potomac, Maryland, U.S.
- Height: 5 ft 9 in (175 cm)
- Weight: 161 lb (73 kg; 11 st 7 lb)
- Position: Center / Right Wing
- Shoots: Right
- KHL team Former teams: Dinamo Minsk; Iowa Wild; Utica Comets; Springfield Thunderbirds; Hershey Bears
- NHL draft: Undrafted
- Playing career: 2016–present

Sam Anas (born June 1, 1993) is an American professional ice hockey forward for HC Dinamo Minsk of the Kontinental Hockey League (KHL). While growing up in Potomac, Maryland, he attended Landon School. Later, he attended Quinnipiac University. He became the second player that played in the Montgomery Youth Hockey Association (MYHA) to sign an NHL contract when he agreed to terms with the Minnesota Wild.

== Playing career ==
Anas played for the NCAA Division I Quinnipiac Bobcats men's ice hockey team in the ECAC Hockey conference. In his freshman year, Anas's outstanding play was rewarded when he was selected as 2014 ECAC Hockey Rookie of the Year and named to both the 2013–14 ECAC Hockey All-Rookie Team and the All-ECAC Hockey Second Team. Anas was further honored when he was chosen as the 2014 College Hockey News Rookie of the Year. As a sophomore, he landed a spot on the AHCA/CCM Hockey All-American Second Team.

He received AHCA/CCM Hockey Men's Division I All-America First Team honors following his junior year (2015–16), while making the ECAC Hockey First Team, the All-CollegeHockeyNews.com Second Team and the NCAA Tournament All-Regional Team.

On April 15, 2016, Anas signed a two-year, two-way contract with the Minnesota Wild. This made him the first player born in the Washington, D.C., area who played hockey locally through high school and then signed with an NHL team.

Anas won the American Hockey League's scoring title in 2019–20, but unable to crack the NHL with the Minnesota Wild during his highly successful tenure in the AHL with Iowa, Anas left as a free agent. On October 10, 2020, Anas agreed to a two-year, two-way contract with the St. Louis Blues.

Following his stint in the Blues organization, Anas left as a free agent and signed a one-year AHL contract with the Hershey Bears for the 2022–23 season on August 15, 2022.

After his Calder Cup success with the Bears, Anas left the AHL as a free agent and opted to pursue a career abroad by signing a one-year deal with Belarusian club, HC Dinamo Minsk of the KHL, on July 10, 2023.

== Personal life ==
Anas is of Greek descent, the son of Peter and Demetra Anas. While at Quinnipiac University, Anas majored in business. His mother Demetra died from breast cancer in August 2020.

== Career statistics ==
			Regular season					Playoffs
Season	Team	League	GP	G	A	Pts	PIM	GP	G	A	Pts	PIM
2010–11	Washington Little Capitals	MetJHL	19	20	21	41	4	—	—	—	—	—
2011–12	Youngstown Phantoms	USHL	51	17	17	34	14	6	0	4	4	4
2012–13	Youngstown Phantoms	USHL	64	37	26	63	18	9	3	9	12	6
2013–14	Quinnipiac University	ECAC	40	22	21	43	14	—	—	—	—	—
2014–15	Quinnipiac University	ECAC	38	23	16	39	20	—	—	—	—	—
2015–16	Quinnipiac University	ECAC	43	24	26	50	18	—	—	—	—	—
2016–17	Iowa Wild	AHL	66	12	16	28	6	—	—	—	—	—
2017–18	Iowa Wild	AHL	70	26	35	61	14	—	—	—	—	—
2018–19	Iowa Wild	AHL	60	14	24	38	12	11	1	6	7	2
2019–20	Iowa Wild	AHL	63	20	50	70	10	—	—	—	—	—
2020–21	Utica Comets	AHL	23	4	19	23	2	—	—	—	—	—
2021–22	Springfield Thunderbirds	AHL	75	20	44	64	12	18	4	11	15	8
2022–23	Hershey Bears	AHL	41	13	8	21	6	20	4	8	12	0
2023–24	Dinamo Minsk	KHL	60	21	25	46	14	6	2	2	4	0
2024–25	Dinamo Minsk	KHL	66	19	27	46	20	9	2	5	7	0
2025–26	Dinamo Minsk	KHL	67	32	57	89	14	8	3	2	5	6
AHL totals			398	109	196	305	62	49	9	25	34	10

== Awards and honors ==
Award	Year
College
All-ECAC Hockey Rookie Team	2013–14
All-ECAC Hockey Second Team	2013–14
ECAC Hockey Rookie of the Year	2013–14
College Hockey News Rookie of the Year	2013–14
NCAA Ice Hockey National Rookie of the Year	2013–14
All-ECAC Hockey Second Team	2014–15
AHCA East Second-Team All-American	2014–15
All-ECAC Hockey First Team	2015–16
AHCA East First-Team All-American	2015–16
AHL
All-Star Game	2020
First All-Star Team	2020
John B. Sollenberger Trophy	2020
Fred T. Hunt Memorial Award	2022
Calder Cup	2023
KHL
Golden Helmet Award (All-Star Team)	2026
KHL Top Scorer	2026

Awards and achievements
Preceded by Jason Kasdorf	ECAC Hockey Rookie of the Year (co-winner with Gavin Bayreuther); 2013–14	Succeeded by Kyle Hayton
Preceded by Jon Gillies	Tim Taylor Award; 2013–14	Succeeded by Jack Eichel
