= Jon Lizotte =

American ice hockey player (born 1994)

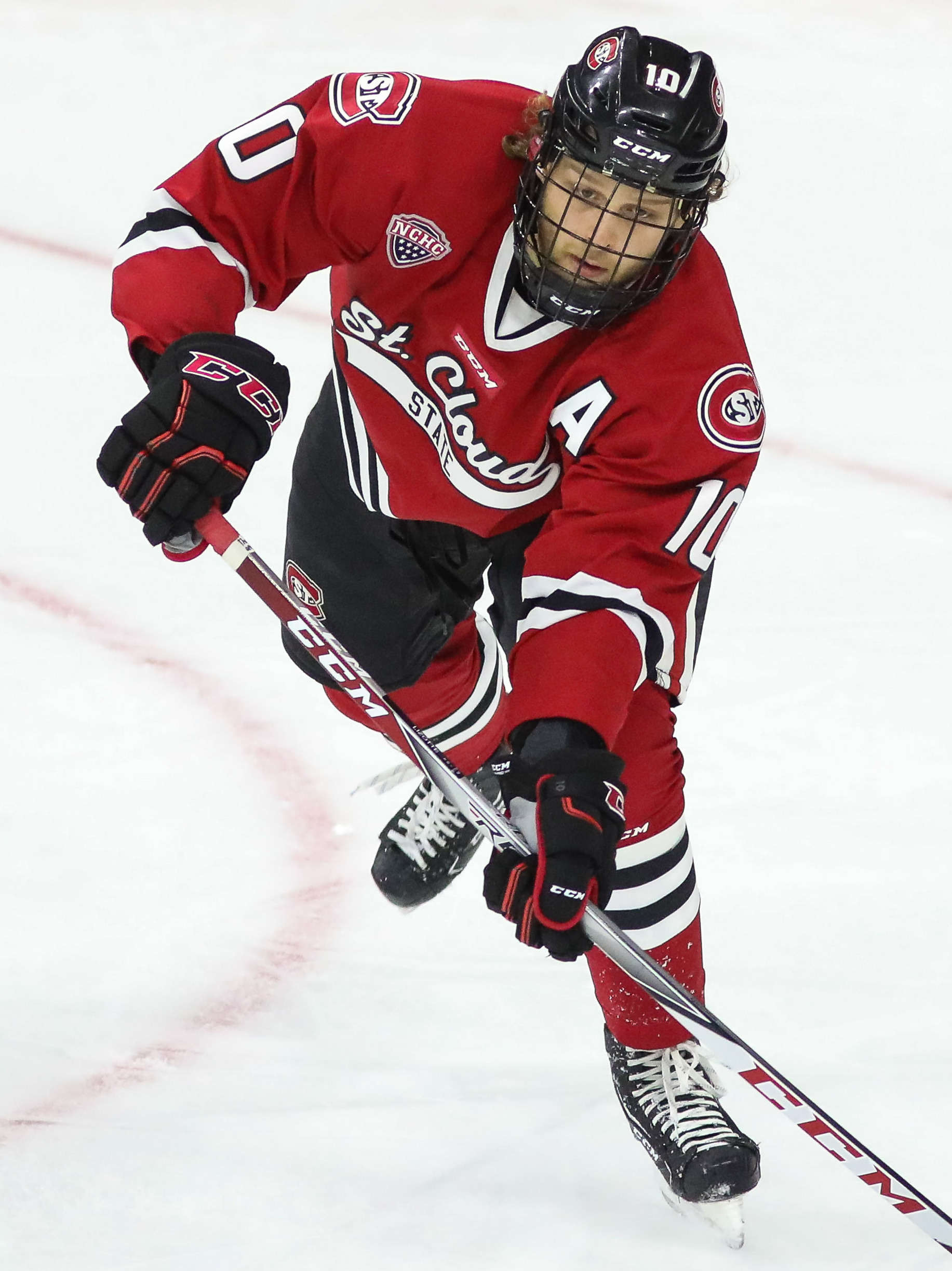
- Lizotte with St. Cloud State in 2017
- Born: November 10, 1994 (age 31) Minot, North Dakota, US
- Height: 6 ft 1 in (185 cm)
- Weight: 216 lb (98 kg; 15 st 6 lb)
- Position: Defense
- Shot: Left
- Played for: Minnesota Wild; Iowa Wild; Wilkes-Barre/Scranton Penguins
- NHL draft: Undrafted
- Playing career: 2019–2023

Jon Lizotte (born November 10, 1994) is an American former professional ice hockey defenseman. He played one National Hockey League game for the Minnesota Wild.

== Playing career ==
Lizotte was born in Minot, North Dakota where his parents own and operate a fireworks business. He grew up in Grand Forks, North Dakota. He played four seasons of college hockey with the St. Cloud State Huskies from 2015 to 2019 and was signed as a free agent by the Wild on July 28, 2021 to a one-year deal after played for the Wilkes-Barre/Scranton Penguins in the American Hockey League since 2019.

In the 2021–22 season, Lizotte was recalled by the Wild from AHL affiliate, the Iowa Wild and made his NHL Debut on October 28, 2021 in a game against the Seattle Kraken.

As a free agent following the conclusion of his contract with the Wild, Lizotte opted to return to former AHL club, the Wilkes-Barre/Scranton Penguins, by agreeing to a one-year contract on July 15, 2022.

== Career statistics ==
			Regular season					Playoffs
Season	Team	League	GP	G	A	Pts	PIM	GP	G	A	Pts	PIM
2009–10	Grand Forks Red River	USHS	22	3	7	10	28	—	—	—	—	—
2010–11	Grand Forks Red River	USHS	26	7	17	24	30	—	—	—	—	—
2011–12	Grand Forks Red River	USHS	26	9	27	36	18	—	—	—	—	—
2012–13	Grand Forks Red River	USHS	27	13	29	42	23	—	—	—	—	—
2013–14	Minot Minotauros	NAHL	58	10	15	25	26	4	1	1	2	2
2014–15	Minot Minotauros	NAHL	58	10	24	34	50	8	0	4	4	4
2015–16	St. Cloud State	NCHC	38	0	10	10	18	—	—	—	—	—
2016–17	St. Cloud State	NCHC	30	4	6	10	10	—	—	—	—	—
2017–18	St. Cloud State	NCHC	40	5	12	17	15	—	—	—	—	—
2018–19	St. Cloud State	NCHC	39	1	8	9	50	—	—	—	—	—
2018–19	Wilkes-Barre/Scranton Penguins	AHL	3	1	1	2	0	—	—	—	—	—
2019–20	Wilkes-Barre/Scranton Penguins	AHL	59	0	17	17	12	—	—	—	—	—
2020–21	Wilkes-Barre/Scranton Penguins	AHL	32	3	6	9	23	—	—	—	—	—
2021–22	Iowa Wild	AHL	56	2	7	9	23	—	—	—	—	—
2021–22	Minnesota Wild	NHL	1	0	0	0	2	—	—	—	—	—
2022–23	Wilkes-Barre/Scranton Penguins	AHL	62	1	9	10	34	—	—	—	—	—
NHL totals			1	0	0	0	2	—	—	—	—	—

== Awards and honors ==
Award	Year
NAHL
All-Rookie Second Team	2014
All-Central Division Team	2015
