= Dominic Toninato =

American ice hockey player (born 1994)

- Born: March 9, 1994 (age 32) Duluth, Minnesota, U.S.
- Height: 6 ft 2 in (188 cm)
- Weight: 200 lb (91 kg; 14 st 4 lb)
- Position: Forward
- Shoots: Left
- NHL team Former teams: Chicago Blackhawks; Colorado Avalanche; Florida Panthers; Winnipeg Jets
- NHL draft: 126th overall, 2012; Toronto Maple Leafs
- Playing career: 2017–present

Dominic Toninato (born March 9, 1994) is an American professional ice hockey player who is a forward for the Chicago Blackhawks of the National Hockey League (NHL). He was selected in the fifth round, 126th overall, by the Toronto Maple Leafs in the 2012 NHL entry draft.

== Playing career ==
=== Amateur ===
Toninato was born and raised in Duluth, Minnesota, and first played High School hockey with Duluth East High School. Toninato was selected as team captain for the Greyhounds in the 2011–12 season, and capped off a productive three-season career by helping the School to a fourth straight berth in the Minnesota State Class AA Tournament and delivered a 61 point season, amassing 27 goals and 34 assists in 25 outings to be selected as a Mr. Hockey Award finalist in addition to landing a spot on the All-State second team. On January 24, 2012, Toninato followed his fathers footsteps in committing to a collegiate career with the University of Minnesota-Duluth.

Having completed his senior year with Duluth East, Toninato closed out the season with the Fargo Force in the United States Hockey League, having been previously drafted by the club at the 2011 USHL Entry Draft. In gaining attention from the professional ranks as a two-way player, Toninato in his first year of eligibility was the first Minnesota prep school player drafted in the 2012 NHL entry draft, selected in the fifth round (126th overall) by the Toronto Maple Leafs.

Toninato returned to continue his development with Fargo of the USHL for the 2012–13 season. He completed a highly-productive season, tying for eighth among league scoring with 70 points in 64 regular season outings. He added six points during a 13-game playoff run in which the Force advanced to the Clark Cup finals and was selected to the USHL's Second All-Star Team.

Toninato joined the University of Minnesota-Duluth of the National Collegiate Hockey Conference and began his collegiate career in contributing with 7 goals and 15 points as a freshman in the 2013–14 season. He almost doubled his offensive output with 16 goals and 10 assists as a sophomore in the following 2014–15 campaign.

In his junior season with the Bulldogs in 2015–16, Toninato saw a dip in his production, scoring 15 goals and 21 points in 40 games and suffered a second successive regional finals failure in a 3–2 defeat to Boston College. Despite a contract offer in the off-season by the Maple Leafs to turn professional, Toninato passed to return for his senior year as captain with UMD.

In the 2016–17 season, Toninato registered a season best 29 points with 16 goals and 13 assists in 42 games and finished with a team-high +25 plus/minus rating. He led the Bulldogs to their first-ever NCHC title and advanced to the NCAA Frozen Four Championship game before suffering a defeat to the University of Denver. He was selected to the NCHC All-Tournament Team and honored as the league's best Defensive Forward.

=== Professional ===
Having completed his four-year collegiate career with the Bulldogs, Toninato was not offered an entry-level contract due to the Maple Leafs being up against the contract limit. With little interest in signing an AHL contract within the organization, Toninato rights were relinquished by the Maple Leafs after the August 15, 2017, deadline.

As a free agent, Toninato promptly signed to a two-year, entry-level contract with the Colorado Avalanche on August 17, 2017. After participating in his first rookie and main roster training camp with the Avalanche, Toninato was re-assigned to begin the 2017–18 season with AHL affiliate, the San Antonio Rampage on September 27, 2017. He made his professional debut with the Rampage on opening night in a 2–1 victory over the Ontario Reign on October 7, 2017. In his third game he scored his first two professional goals in a 6–2 loss to the Texas Stars on October 21, 2017. Playing a two-way responsible game with the Rampage, Toninato received his first recall to the Avalanche on November 17, 2017. Centering a line between Sven Andrighetto and Nail Yakupov, Toninato made his NHL debut with the Avalanche in a 5–2 defeat to the Nashville Predators on November 18, 2017. During the first period, Toninato was illegally boarded by the Predators' forward, Austin Watson, who was ejected from the game and later suspended. He missed the rest of the period with a head/neck injury before returning for the second period to play out the game. On February 14, 2019 Toninato scored his first NHL goal, after not scoring during the 37 games of his rookie season, in Colorado's 4-1 win over Winnipeg.

On June 29, 2019, Toninato was traded by the Avalanche to the Florida Panthers in exchange for Jacob MacDonald. He agreed to his qualifying offer, accepting a one-year, two-way contract with the Panthers on July 15, 2019. In the following 2019–20 season, Toninato began the campaign in the AHL with affiliate, the Springfield Thunderbirds. He was soon recalled to the Panthers and cemented a role as a depth forward, recording a career high 4 goals and 11 points through 46 games. He returned after the COVID-19 pandemic pause, making his post-season debut in 3 games.

As an impending restricted free agent, Toninato was not tendered a qualifying offer by the Panthers and was released as a free agent. On October 10, 2020, Toninato was signed to a one-year, two-way contract with the Winnipeg Jets.

After five seasons within the Jets organization, Toninato left as a free agent to sign a two-year, two-way contract with the Chicago Blackhawks on July 1, 2025.

== Personal life ==
His father, Jim Toninato, was also a former collegiate player with the University of Minnesota-Duluth. He collected 54 points in 155 games throughout his four-year career with Bulldogs from 1982 to 1986. During his tenure with UMD, Toninato majored in Human Resources Management.

== Career statistics ==
			Regular season					Playoffs
Season	Team	League	GP	G	A	Pts	PIM	GP	G	A	Pts	PIM
2009–10	Duluth East High	USHS	25	4	7	11	6	3	3	2	5	0
2010–11	Duluth East High	USHS	23	24	27	51	12	3	3	3	6	0
2011–12	Duluth East High	USHS	25	27	34	61	28	3	3	3	6	4
2011–12	Fargo Force	USHL	4	1	0	1	2	—	—	—	—	—
2012–13	Fargo Force	USHL	64	29	41	70	50	13	3	3	6	6
2013–14	U. of Minnesota-Duluth	NCHC	35	7	8	15	51	—	—	—	—	—
2014–15	U. of Minnesota-Duluth	NCHC	34	16	10	26	58	—	—	—	—	—
2015–16	U. of Minnesota-Duluth	NCHC	40	15	6	21	36	—	—	—	—	—
2016–17	U. of Minnesota-Duluth	NCHC	42	16	13	29	30	—	—	—	—	—
2017–18	San Antonio Rampage	AHL	31	7	5	12	24	—	—	—	—	—
2017–18	Colorado Avalanche	NHL	37	0	2	2	12	—	—	—	—	—
2018–19	Colorado Eagles	AHL	57	14	15	29	43	4	0	2	2	2
2018–19	Colorado Avalanche	NHL	2	1	0	1	0	—	—	—	—	—
2019–20	Springfield Thunderbirds	AHL	15	5	3	8	18	—	—	—	—	—
2019–20	Florida Panthers	NHL	46	4	7	11	37	3	0	0	0	0
2020–21	Manitoba Moose	AHL	3	3	0	3	2	—	—	—	—	—
2020–21	Winnipeg Jets	NHL	2	0	1	1	0	3	1	0	1	2
2021–22	Manitoba Moose	AHL	2	0	1	1	2	—	—	—	—	—
2021–22	Winnipeg Jets	NHL	77	7	7	14	22	—	—	—	—	—
2022–23	Manitoba Moose	AHL	50	19	16	35	24	5	0	2	2	8
2022–23	Winnipeg Jets	NHL	5	0	1	1	2	—	—	—	—	—
2023–24	Manitoba Moose	AHL	37	7	13	20	28	2	0	0	0	2
2023–24	Winnipeg Jets	NHL	15	1	4	5	6	—	—	—	—	—
2024–25	Manitoba Moose	AHL	60	18	18	36	81	—	—	—	—	—
2024–25	Winnipeg Jets	NHL	5	0	0	0	0	2	0	0	0	2
2025–26	Rockford IceHogs	AHL	52	16	27	43	57	—	—	—	—	—
2025–26	Chicago Blackhawks	NHL	8	0	1	1	6	—	—	—	—	—
NHL totals			197	13	23	36	85	8	1	0	1	4

== Awards and honors ==
Award	Year
USHL
Second All-Star Team	2013
College
NCHC Honorable Mention All-Star Team	2015
NCHC All-Tournament Team	2016, 2017
NCHC Best Defensive Forward	2017

Awards and achievements
Preceded by Sean Kuraly	NCHC Defensive Forward of the Year; 2016–17	Succeeded by Rhett Gardner
