= List of St. Cloud State Huskies men's ice hockey seasons =

This is a season-by-season list of records compiled by St. Cloud State in men's ice hockey.

St. Cloud State has made 15 appearances in the NCAA Tournament Reaching the Frozen Four in both 2013 & 2021.

== Season-by-season results ==
Note: GP = Games played, W = Wins, L = Losses, T = Ties

NCAA Champions	NCAA Frozen Four	Conference regular season champions	Conference Playoff Champions

Season	Conference	Regular Season (Note: Code explanation; GP—Games Played, W—Wins, L—Losses, T—Tied games, OTW—Overtime Wins, OTL—Overtime Loses, 3/SW—Win in 3 on 3 overtime or shootout, Pts—Points*)														Conference Tournament Results	National Tournament Results
Season	Conference	Conference									Overall					Conference Tournament Results	National Tournament Results
Season	Conference	GP	W	L	T	OTW	OTL	3/SW	Pts*	Finish	GP	W	L	T	%	Conference Tournament Results	National Tournament Results
Ralph Theisen (1931–1932)
1931–32	Independent	–	–	–	–	–	–	–	–	–	8	1	7	0	.125		
Ludwig Andolsek (1932–1935)
1932–33	Independent	–	–	–	–	–	–	–	–	–	11	10	1	0	.909		
1933–34	Independent	–	–	–	–	–	–	–	–	–	9	7	1	1	.833		
1934–35	Independent	–	–	–	–	–	–	–	–	–	27	25	2	0	.926		
Robert DuPaul (1935–1936)
1935–36	Independent	–	–	–	–	–	–	–	–	–	11	6	5	0	.545		
Walter Gerzin (1936–1937)
1936–37	Independent	–	–	–	–	–	–	–	–	–	10	5	5	0	.500		
Benedict Vandell (1937–1938)
1937–38	Independent	–	–	–	–	–	–	–	–	–	8	4	4	0	.500		
George Lynch (1938–1942)
1938–39	Independent	–	–	–	–	–	–	–	–	–	9	5	4	0	.556		
1939–40	Independent	–	–	–	–	–	–	–	–	–	11	6	5	0	.545		
1940–41	Independent	–	–	–	–	–	–	–	–	–	10	4	4	2	.500		
1941–42	Independent	–	–	–	–	–	–	–	–	–	7	5	2	0	.714		
Program suspended due to World War II
Roland Vandell (1946–1950)
1946–47	Independent	–	–	–	–	–	–	–	–	–	19	14	3	2	.789		
1947–48	Independent	–	–	–	–	–	–	–	–	–	16	12	4	0	.750		
1948–49	Independent	–	–	–	–	–	–	–	–	–	12	6	6	0	.500		
1949–50	Independent	–	–	–	–	–	–	–	–	–	13	7	6	0	.538		
Ray Gasperline (1950–1951)
1950–51	Independent	–	–	–	–	–	–	–	–	–	8	5	3	0	.625		
Roland Vandell (1951–1952)
1951–52	Independent	–	–	–	–	–	–	–	–	–	6	0	6	0	.000		
George Martin (1952–1953)
1952–53	Independent	–	–	–	–	–	–	–	–	–	11	8	3	0	.727		
Brendan McDonald (1953–1954)
1953–54	Independent	–	–	–	–	–	–	–	–	–	4	2	2	0	.625		
Jim Baxter (1954–1956)
1954–55	Independent	–	–	–	–	–	–	–	–	–	8	7	1	0	.875		
1955–56	Independent	–	–	–	–	–	–	–	–	–	15	11	3	1	.767		
Jack Wink (1956–1968)
1956–57	Independent	–	–	–	–	–	–	–	–	–	11	5	6	0	.455		
1957–58	Independent	–	–	–	–	–	–	–	–	–	9	4	5	0	.444		
1958–59	Independent	–	–	–	–	–	–	–	–	–	12	6	6	0	.500		
1959–60	Independent	–	–	–	–	–	–	–	–	–	13	11	2	0	.846		
1960–61	Independent	–	–	–	–	–	–	–	–	–	13	12	1	0	.923		
1961–62	Independent	–	–	–	–	–	–	–	–	–	12	12	0	0	1.000		
1962–63	Independent	–	–	–	–	–	–	–	–	–	7	5	1	1	.786		
1963–64	Independent	–	–	–	–	–	–	–	–	–	6	3	2	1	.583		
College Division
1964–65	Independent	–	–	–	–	–	–	–	–	–	9	5	4	0	.556		
1965–66	Independent	–	–	–	–	–	–	–	–	–	14	4	10	0	.286		
1966–67	Independent	–	–	–	–	–	–	–	–	–	15	1	14	0	.067		
1967–68	Independent	–	–	–	–	–	–	–	–	–	19	1	18	0	.053		
Charlie Basch (1968–1984)
1968–69	Independent	–	–	–	–	–	–	–	–	–	20	2	18	0	.100		
1969–70	Independent	–	–	–	–	–	–	–	–	–	17	7	10	0	.412		
1970–71	Independent	–	–	–	–	–	–	–	–	–	17	10	7	0	.588		
1971–72	Independent	–	–	–	–	–	–	–	–	–	16	7	9	0	.438		
1972–73	Independent	–	–	–	–	–	–	–	–	–	20	8	12	0	.400		
Division II
1973–74	Independent	–	–	–	–	–	–	–	–	–	23	15	6	2	.696		
1974–75	Independent	–	–	–	–	–	–	–	–	–	25	16	9	0	.640		
1975–76	Independent	–	–	–	–	–	–	–	–	–	14	9	14	1	.396		
1976–77	Independent	–	–	–	–	–	–	–	–	–	24	10	13	1	.438		
1977–78	Independent	–	–	–	–	–	–	–	–	–	24	12	12	0	.500	Lost WCT Semifinal, 1–5 (Lake Forest)	
1978–79	Independent	–	–	–	–	–	–	–	–	–	24	10	13	1	.438	Lost WCT Semifinal, 3–4 (Mankato State)	
1979–80	Independent	–	–	–	–	–	–	–	–	–	30	20	9	1	.683	Lost WRT Semifinal, 4–8 (St. Scholastica)	
1980–81	NCHA	13	7	5	1	–	–	–	.577	3rd	31	19	11	1	.629	Lost WRT series, 7–9 (Concordia (MN))	
1981–82	NCHA	20	9	11	0	–	–	–	.450	4th	29	14	15	0	.483		
1982–83	NCHA	20	4	16	0	–	–	–	8	5th	29	11	18	0	.379		
1983–84	NCHA	18	8	10	0	–	–	–	16	T–4th	28	11	17	0	.393		
Division III
John Perpich (1984–1986)
1984–85	NCHA	18	9	7	2	–	–	–	20	2nd	29	14	13	2	.517		
1985–86	NCHA	18	8	9	1	–	–	–	17	5th	29	16	11	2	.586		
Herb Brooks (1986–1987)
1986–87	NCHA	20	13	6	1	–	–	–	27	T–1st	36	25	10	1	.708	Won Semifinal series, 2–1 (Wisconsin–River Falls); Won Championship series, 2–0 (Bemidji State)	Won Quarterfinal series, 2–1 Salem State; Lost Semifinal, 2–5 (Oswego State); Won Third-place game, 6–4 (Bemidji State)
Division I
Craig Dahl (1987–2005)
1987–88	Independent	–	–	–	–	–	–	–	–	–	37	11	25	1	.311		
1988–89	Independent	–	–	–	–	–	–	–	–	–	37	19	16	2	.541		Lost First round Series, 0–2 (Lake Superior State)
1989–90	Independent	–	–	–	–	–	–	–	–	–	38	17	19	2	.474		
1990–91	WCHA	32	12	16	4	–	–	–	28	T–5th	41	18	19	4	.488	Lost Quarterfinal series, 1–2 (North Dakota)	
1991–92	WCHA	32	12	19	1	–	–	–	25	T–7th	37	14	21	2	.403	Lost Quarterfinal series, 1–2 (Wisconsin)	
1992–93	WCHA	32	14	16	2	–	–	–	30	7th	36	15	18	3	.458	Lost Quarterfinal series, 0–2 (Michigan Tech)	
1993–94	WCHA	32	16	12	4	–	–	–	36	4th	38	21	13	4	.605	Won First round series, 2–0 (Minnesota–Duluth); Won Semifinal, 3–2 (OT) (Wisconsin); Lost Championship, 2–3 (OT) (Minnesota)	
1994–95	WCHA	32	15	16	1	–	–	–	31	T–5th	38	17	20	1	.461	Lost Quarterfinal series, 0–2 (North Dakota)	
1995–96	WCHA	32	10	18	4	–	–	–	24	8th	39	13	22	4	.385	Won First round series, 2–1 (Denver); Lost Quarterfinal, 3–4 (OT) (Michigan Tech)	
1996–97	WCHA	32	18	10	4	–	–	–	40	3rd	40	23	13	4	.625	Won First round series, 2–0 (Northern Michigan); Lost Semifinal, 4–5 (OT) (Minnesota); Lost Third-place game, 0–6 (Colorado College)	
1997–98	WCHA	28	16	11	1	–	–	–	33	4th	40	22	16	2	.575	Won First round series, 2–1 (Michigan Tech); Won Quarterfinal, 4–3 (Minnesota–Duluth); Lost Semifinal, 3–4 (North Dakota); Lost Third-place game, 1–6 (Colorado College)	
1998–99	WCHA	28	8	16	4	–	–	–	20	7th	39	16	18	5	.474	Won First round series, 2–0 (Wisconsin); Lost Quarterfinal, 3–5 (Minnesota)	
1999–00	WCHA	28	16	9	3	–	–	–	35	3rd	40	23	14	3	.613	Won First round series, 2–1 (Minnesota–Duluth); Lost Semifinal, 3–7 (North Dakota); Won Third-place game, 6–4 (Minnesota)	Lost Regional Quarterfinal, 3–5 (Boston University)
2000–01	WCHA	28	20	8	0	–	–	–	40	2nd	41	31	9	1	.768	Won First round series, 2-0 (Alaska–Anchorage); Won Semifinal, 3–0 (Minnesota); Won Championship, 6–5 (OT) (North Dakota)	Lost Regional semifinal, 3–4 (Michigan)
2001–02	WCHA	28	19	7	2	–	–	–	40	2nd	42	29	11	2	.714	Won First round series, 2–0 (Minnesota–Duluth); Lost Semifinal, 1–4 (Minnesota); Lost Third-place game, 1–2 (Colorado College)	Lost Regional Quarterfinal, 2–4 (Michigan)
2002–03	WCHA	28	12	11	5	–	–	–	29	6th	38	17	16	5	.513	Lost First round series, 1–2 (Minnesota–Duluth)	
2003–04	WCHA	28	12	12	4	–	–	–	28	6th	38	18	16	4	.526	Lost First round series, 0–2 (Minnesota)	
2004–05	WCHA	28	8	19	1	–	–	–	17	9th	40	14	23	3	.388	Lost First round series, 0–2 (Colorado College)	
Bob Motzko (2005–2018)
2005–06	WCHA	28	13	13	2	–	–	–	28	6th	42	22	16	4	.571	Won First round series, 2–1 (Colorado College); Won Quarterfinal, 5–1 (Minnesota–Duluth); Won Semifinal, 8–7 (OT) (Minnesota); Lost Championship, 3–5 (North Dakota)	
2006–07	WCHA	28	14	7	7	–	–	–	35	2nd	40	22	11	7	.638	Won First round series, 2–1 (Minnesota–Duluth); Lost Semifinal, 2–6 (North Dakota); Lost Third-place game, 3–4 (OT) (Wisconsin)	Lost Regional semifinal, 1–4 (Maine)
2007–08	WCHA	28	12	12	4	–	–	–	28	T–4th	40	19	16	5	.538	Won First round series, 2–0 (Wisconsin); Lost Quarterfinal, 2–3 (Minnesota)	Lost Regional semifinal, 1–2 (Clarkson)
2008–09	WCHA	28	13	13	2	–	–	–	28	6th	38	18	17	3	.513	Lost First round series, 0–2 (Minnesota)	
2009–10	WCHA	28	15	9	4	–	–	–	34	3rd	43	24	14	5	.616	Won First round series, 2–1 (Minnesota State); Won Semifinal, 2–0 (Wisconsin); Lost Championship, 3–5 (North Dakota)	Won Regional semifinal, 4–3 (2OT) (Northern Michigan); Lost Regional Final, 3–5 (Wisconsin)
2010–11	WCHA	28	11	13	4	–	–	–	26	T–8th	38	15	18	5	.461	Lost First round series, 0–2 (Minnesota–Duluth)	
2011–12	WCHA	28	12	12	4	–	–	–	28	6th	39	17	17	5	.500	Won First round series, 2–0 (Nebraska–Omaha); Lost Quarterfinal, 1–4 (North Dakota)	
2012–13	WCHA	28	18	9	1	–	–	–	37	T–1st	42	25	16	1	.607	Won First round series, 2–0 (Alaska–Anchorage); Lost Semifinal, 1–4 (Wisconsin)	Won Regional semifinal, 5–1 (Notre Dame); Won Regional Final, 1–4 (Miami); Lost National semifinal, 1–4 (Quinnipiac)
2013–14	NCHC	24	15	6	3	–	–	0	48	1st	38	22	11	5	.645	Lost Quarterfinal series, 0–2 (Miami)	Won Regional semifinal, 4–3 (OT) (Notre Dame); Lost Regional Final, 0–4 (Minnesota)
2014–15	NCHC	24	11	12	1	–	–	0	34	6th	40	20	19	1	.513	Won Quarterfinal series, 2–0 (Omaha); Won Semifinal, 1–3 (North Dakota); Lost Championship, 2–3 (Miami)	Won Regional semifinal, 3–2 (OT) (Michigan Tech); Lost Regional Final, 4–1 (North Dakota)
2015–16	NCHC	24	17	6	1	–	–	1	53	T–2nd	41	31	9	1	.768	Won Quarterfinal series, 2–0 (Western Michigan); Won Semifinal, 4–2 (Denver); Won,Championship, 3–1 (Minnesota–Duluth)	Lost Regional semifinal, 4–5 (OT) (Ferris State)
2016–17	NCHC	24	10	13	1	–	–	1	35	5th	36	16	19	1	.458	Lost First round series, 0–2 (North Dakota)	
2017–18	NCHC	24	16	4	4	–	–	1	53	1st	40	25	9	6	.700	Won First round series, 2–1 (Miami); Won Semifinal, 3–2 (OT) (North Dakota); Lost Championship, 1–4 (Denver)	Lost Regional semifinal, 1–4 (Air Force)
Brett Larson (2018–Present)
2018–19	NCHC	24	19	2	3	–	–	2	62	1st	39	30	6	3	.808	Won First round series, 2–0 (Miami); Won Semifinal, 5–2 (Colorado College); Lost Championship, 2–3 (2OT) (Minnesota–Duluth)	Lost Regional semifinal, 1–2 (American International)
2019–20	NCHC	24	10	12	2	–	–	1	33	5th	34	13	15	6	.471	Tournament Cancelled	
2020–21	NCHC	24	15	9	0	3	3	0	.625	2nd	31	20	11	0	.645	Won Quarterfinal, 2–1 (Colorado College); Won Semifinal, 3–2 (Minnesota Duluth); Lost Championship, 3–5 (North Dakota)	Won Regional semifinal, 6–2 (Boston University); Won Regional Final, 4–1 (Boston College); Won National semifinal, 5–4 (Minnesota State); Lost National Championship, 0–5 (Massachusetts)
2021–22	NCHC	24	10	10	4	1	2	1	41	T-4th	37	18	15	4	.541	Lost Quarterfinal series, 0–2 (Minnesota Duluth)	Lost Regional semifinal, 4–5 (Quinnipiac)
2022–23	NCHC	24	12	9	3	3	2	1	36	4th	40	25	12	3	.663	Won Quarterfinal series, 2–1 (Minnesota Duluth); Won Semifinal, 3–2 (OT) (North Dakota); Won Championship, 3–0 (Colorado College)	Won Regional semifinal, 4–0 (Minnesota State); Lost Regional Final, 1–4 (Minnesota)
2023–24	NCHC	24	11	9	4	1	3	2	41	T–3rd	38	17	16	5	.513	Won Quarterfinal series, 2–1 (Western Michigan); Lost Semifinal, 4–5 (OT) (Denver)	
2024–25	NCHC	24	7	16	1	2	3	0	23	8th	36	14	21	1	.403	Lost Quarterfinal series, 0–2 (Western Michigan)	
Totals											GP	W	L	T	%	Championships	
Regular Season											2163	1130	890	143	.555	1 NCHA Championship, 1 WCHA Championship, 3 NCHC Championship	
Conference Post-season											127	65	62	0	.512	1 NCHA tournament championship, 1 WCHA tournament championship, 2 NCHC tournament championships	
NCAA Post-season											29	11	18	0	.379	1 NCAA D–III Tournament appearance, 16 NCAA D–I Tournament appearances	
Regular Season and Post-season Record											2319	1206	970	143	.551		

* Winning percentage is used when conference schedules are unbalanced.
