= 2018 NCAA Division I men's ice hockey tournament =

- 2018 Frozen Four logo
- Teams: 16
- Finals site: Xcel Energy Center, St. Paul, Minnesota
- Champions: Minnesota–Duluth Bulldogs (2nd title)
- Runner-up: Notre Dame Fighting Irish (2nd title game)
- Semifinalists: Michigan Wolverines (25th Frozen Four); Ohio State Buckeyes (2nd Frozen Four)
- Winning coach: Scott Sandelin (2nd title)
- MOP: Karson Kuhlman (Minnesota-Duluth)
- Attendance: 18,303 (Championship); 54,535 (Frozen Four); 136,554 (Tournament)

The 2018 NCAA Division I men's ice hockey tournament was the national championship tournament for men's college ice hockey in the United States. The tournament involved 16 teams in single-elimination play to determine the national champion at the Division I level of the National Collegiate Athletic Association (NCAA), the highest level of competition in college hockey. The tournament's Frozen Four – the semifinals and final – were hosted by the University of Minnesota at the Xcel Energy Center in St. Paul, Minnesota from April 5–7, 2018.

Minnesota-Duluth defeated Notre Dame 2–1 to win the program's 2nd NCAA title.

== Tournament procedure ==
2018 Regionals (blue) and Frozen Four (red)

The tournament is composed of four groups of four teams in regional brackets. The four regionals are officially named after their geographic areas. The following are the sites for the 2018 regionals:

March 23–24
East Regional, Webster Bank Arena – Bridgeport, Connecticut (Host: Fairfield and Yale)
West Regional, Premier Center – Sioux Falls, South Dakota (Host: North Dakota)
March 24–25
Northeast Regional, DCU Center – Worcester, Massachusetts (Host: Holy Cross)
Midwest Regional, PPL Center – Allentown, Pennsylvania (Host: Penn State)

The winner of each regional will advance to the Frozen Four:

April 5–7
Xcel Energy Center – St. Paul, Minnesota (Host: University of Minnesota)

== Qualifying teams ==
The at-large bids and seeding for each team in the tournament were announced on March 18. The Big Ten had four teams receive a berth in the tournament, the NCHC, Hockey East, and ECAC Hockey each had three teams receive a berth, the Western Collegiate Hockey Association (WCHA) had two teams receive a berth, and one team from Atlantic Hockey received a berth.

East Regional – Bridgeport							West Regional – Sioux Falls						
Seed	School	Conference	Record	Berth type	Appearance	Last bid	Seed	School	Conference	Record	Berth type	Appearance	Last bid
1	Notre Dame (2)	Big Ten	25–9–2	Tournament champion	10th	2017	1	St. Cloud State (1)	NCHC	25–8–6	At-large bid	13th	2016
2	Providence	Hockey East	23–11–4	At-large bid	14th	2017	2	Minnesota State	WCHA	29–9–1	At-large bid	5th	2015
3	Clarkson	ECAC	23–10–6	At-large bid	21st	2008	3	Minnesota–Duluth	NCHC	21–16–3	At-large bid	12th	2017
4	Michigan Tech	WCHA	22–16–5	Tournament champion	13th	2017	4	Air Force	Atlantic Hockey	22–14–5	Tournament champion	7th	2017
Northeast Regional – Worcester							Midwest Regional – Allentown						
Seed	School	Conference	Record	Berth type	Appearance	Last bid	Seed	School	Conference	Record	Berth type	Appearance	Last bid
1	Cornell (3)	ECAC	25–5–2	At-large bid	21st	2017	1	Ohio State (4)	Big Ten	24–9–5	At-large bid	8th	2017
2	Michigan	Big Ten	20–14–3	At-large bid	37th	2016	2	Denver	NCHC	20–9–8	Tournament champion	28th	2017
3	Northeastern	Hockey East	23–9–5	At-large bid	6th	2016	3	Penn State	Big Ten	18–14–5	At-large bid	2nd	2017
4	Boston University	Hockey East	21–13–4	Tournament champion	36th	2017	4	Princeton	ECAC	19–12–4	Tournament champion	4th	2009

Number in parentheses denotes overall seed in the tournament.

== Tournament bracket ==
Regional semifinals March 23–24
1	St. Cloud State (1)	1
4	Air Force	4
Sioux Falls – Fri/Sat
2	Minnesota State	2
3	Minnesota–Duluth	3*
1	Ohio State (4)	4
4	Princeton	2
Allentown – Sat/Sun
2	Denver	5
3	Penn State	1
1	Cornell (3)	1
4	Boston University	3
Worcester – Sat/Sun
2	Michigan	3
3	Northeastern	2
1	Notre Dame (2)	4*
4	Michigan Tech	3
Bridgeport – Fri/Sat
2	Providence	1
3	Clarkson	0

Regional Finals; March 24–25
4	Air Force	1
3	Minnesota–Duluth	2
1	Ohio State (4)	5
2	Denver	1
4	Boston University	3
2	Michigan	6
1	Notre Dame (2)	2
2	Providence	1

Semifinals; April 5
W3	Minnesota-Duluth	2
MW1	Ohio State (4)	1
NE2	Michigan	3
E1	Notre Dame (2)	4

Championship; April 7
W3	Minnesota-Duluth	2
E1	Notre Dame (2)	1

Note: * denotes overtime period

== Results ==
=== West Region – Sioux Falls, South Dakota ===
==== Regional semifinal ====
March 23, 2018; 3:00 pm	(1) St. Cloud State	1 – 4 (0–0, 0–2, 1–2)	(4) Air Force	Premier Center, Sioux Falls, South Dakota; Attendance: 7,992

Game reference

Dávid Hrenák
Goalies
Billy Christopoulos
Referees:
Tony Czech
Brady Johnson
Linesmen:
Paul Tunison
Eric Froberg

	0–1	22:57 – Tyler Ledford (5) (unassisted)
	0–2	26:29 – GW – Tyler Ledford (6) (Koch, Baskin)
Blake Lizotte (8) (Newell, Borgen) – 57:09	1–2
	1–3	58:26 – EN – Jordan Himley (11) (Serratore, Koch)
	1–4	59:12 – EN – Kyle Haak (7) (Serratore, Mirageas)

4 min
Penalties
8 min
40
Shots
26

March 23, 2018; 6:30 pm	(2) Minnesota State	2 – 3 (OT) (2–0, 0–1, 0–1, 0–1)	(3) Minnesota–Duluth	Premier Center, Sioux Falls, South Dakota; Attendance: 7,992

Game reference

Connor LaCouvee
Goalies
Hunter Shepard
Referees:
Geoff Miller
Terrence Murphy
Linesmen:
Kevin Briganti
Nick Briganti

Zeb Knutson (15) (Michaelis) – 02:21	1–0
Ian Scheid (9) (Lutz, McClure) – PP – 06:37	2–0
	2–1	26:38 – Karson Kuhlman (12) (unassisted)
	2–2	55:52 – PP – Nick Swaney (6) (Thomas, Samberg)
	2–3	62:28 – GW – Parker Mackay (9) (Richards, Anderson)

6 min
Penalties
8 min
21
Shots
22

==== Regional Final ====
March 24, 2018; 8:00 pm	(3) Minnesota–Duluth	2 – 1 (2–0, 0–0, 0–1)	(4) Air Force	Premier Center, Sioux Falls, South Dakota; Attendance: 8,015

Game reference

Hunter Shepard
Goalies
Billy Christopoulos
Referees:
Brian Aaron
Barry Pochmara
Linesmen:
Bruce Vida
Joe Hutek

Joey Anderson (11) (Tufte, Samberg) – 09:03	1–0
Nick Wolff (7) (Miller, Perunovich) – GW – 12:12	2–0
	2–1	53:44 – PP – Evan Giesler (12) (Koch, Mirageas)

4 min
Penalties
6 min
26
Shots
12

=== East Region – Bridgeport, Connecticut ===
==== Regional semifinal ====
March 23, 2018; 3:00 pm	(1) Notre Dame	4 – 3 (OT) (0–0, 2–1, 1–2, 1–0)	(4) Michigan Tech	Webster Bank Arena, Bridgeport, Connecticut; Attendance: 5,014

Game reference

Cale Morris
Goalies
Patrick Munson
Referees:
Bryan Hicks
Cameron Lynch
Linesmen:
Jason Shattie
Dmitry Antipin

	0–1	21:13 – Joel L'Esperance (12) (Donohue, Lucchini)
Dylan Malmquist (8) (Oglevie) – PP – 23:40	1–1
Joe Wegwerth (6) (Theisen, O'Leary) – 27:04	2–1
	2–2	40:56 – Gavin Gould (14) (Lucchini, Donohue)
Jordan Gross (9) (Nardella, Oglevie) – PP – 46:19	3–2
	3–3	58:54 – EA – Jake Jackson (13) (Steman, Baltus)
Jordan Gross (10) (Evans, Jenkins) – GW – 76:24	4–3

2 min
Penalties
4 min
32
Shots
39

March 23, 2018; 7:15 pm	(2) Providence	1 – 0 (1–0, 0–0, 0–0)	(3) Clarkson	Webster Bank Arena, Bridgeport, Connecticut; Attendance: 5,014

Game reference
Hayden Hawkey	Goalies	Jake Kielly	Referees: Gino Binda; Nick Kresbach; Linesmen: Joe Filo; Sterling Egan
Kasper Björkqvist (15) (Wilkins, Pinho) – GW PP – 04:02 / 1–0			Referees: Gino Binda; Nick Kresbach; Linesmen: Joe Filo; Sterling Egan
4 min	Penalties	8 min	Referees: Gino Binda; Nick Kresbach; Linesmen: Joe Filo; Sterling Egan
27	Shots	18	Referees: Gino Binda; Nick Kresbach; Linesmen: Joe Filo; Sterling Egan

==== Regional Final ====
March 24, 2018; 6:00 pm	(1) Notre Dame	2 – 1 (0–1, 1–0, 1–0)	(2) Providence	Webster Bank Arena, Bridgeport, Connecticut; Attendance: 5,505

Game reference

Cale Morris
Goalies
Hayden Hawkey
Referees:
Gino Binda
Nick Kresbach
Linesmen:
Joe Filo
Sterling Egan

	0–1	02:02 – Kasper Björkqvist (16) (Davis)
Andrew Oglevie (13) (Evans, Gross) – PP – 38:09	1–1
Dylan Malmquist (9) (Burke, Oglevie) – GW – 59:33	2–1

4 min
Penalties
8 min
25
Shots
20

=== Northeast Region – Worcester, Massachusetts ===
==== Regional semifinal ====
March 24, 2018; 1:00 pm	(1) Cornell	1 – 3 (0–0, 1–1, 0–2)	(4) Boston University	DCU Center, Worcester, Massachusetts; Attendance: 8,441

Game reference

Matthew Galajda
Goalies
Jake Oettinger
Referees:
Colin Kronforst
CJ Beaurline
Linesmen:
Sam Shikowsky
Nick Bradshaw

Trevor Yates (13) (Donaldson, Barron) – 27:27	1–0
	1–1	28:03 – Shane Bowers (17) (Hickey, Carpenter)
	1–2	42:39 – GW – David Farrance (3) (Tkachuk, Melanson)
	1–3	59:43 – EN – Logan Cockerill (8) (Carpenter)

2 min
Penalties
2 min
31
Shots
24

March 24, 2018; 4:30 pm	(2) Michigan	3 – 2 (0–0, 1–1, 2–1)	(3) Northeastern	DCU Center, Worcester, Massachusetts; Attendance: 8,441

Game reference

Hayden Lavigne
Goalies
Cayden Primeau
Referees:
Ryan Hersey
Tim Walsh
Linesmen:
Justin Hills
John Grandt

Cooper Marody (15) (Martin, Calderone) – 35:03	1–0
	1–1	38:04 – PP – Dylan Sikura (22) (Davies, Stevens)
Dexter Dancs (11) (Marody) – 45:45	2–1
	2–2	52:01 – Eric Williams (5) (Shea, Goldstein)
Cooper Marody (16) (Calderone, Dancs) – 55:30	3–2

4 min
Penalties
2 min
32
Shots
21

==== Regional Final ====
March 25, 2018; 4:00 pm	(2) Michigan	6 – 3 (2–1, 1–1, 3–1)	(4) Boston University	DCU Center, Worcester, Massachusetts; Attendance: 5,499

Game reference

Hayden Lavigne
Goalies
Jake Oettinger
Referees:
Ryan Hersey
Tim Walsh
Linesmen:
Justin Hills
John Grandt

Quinn Hughes (5) (Pastujov, Becker) – 05:12	1–0
	1–1	12:26 – Jordan Greenway (13) (Tkachuk)
Tony Calderone (24) (Marody, Cecconi) – PP – 15:21	2–1
Brendan Warren (9) (Norris, Slaker) – 21:57	3–1
	3–2	31:08 – Patrick Curry (13) (Crotty, Krys)
	3–3	43:30 – Drew Melanson (13) (Greenway)
Jake Slaker (15) (unassisted) – GW – 46:27	4–3
Nicholas Boka (1) (Dancs, Becker) – 56:18	5–3
Nick Pastujov (4) (unassisted) – EN – 58:18	6–3

4 min
Penalties
4 min
22
Shots
27

=== Midwest Region – Allentown, Pennsylvania ===
==== Regional semifinal ====
March 24, 2018; 3:30 pm	(1) Ohio State	4 – 2 (2–0, 0–0, 2–2)	(4) Princeton	PPL Center, Allentown, Pennsylvania; Attendance: 7,491

Game reference

Sean Romeo
Goalies
Ryan Ferland (out 58:13)
Ben Halford (in 58:13)
Referees:
Chris Ciamaga
Mike Schubert
Linesmen:
Joe Sherman
Brendan Lewis

Mason Jobst (20) (Laczynski, Ege) – PP – 13:32	1–0
Kevin Miller (6) (Hein, Lampasso) – 13:52	2–0
Tanner Laczynski (16) (Gerard) – GW – 43:55	3–0
Freddy Gerard (12) (Stork) – 50:48	4–0
	4–1	59:33 – PP – Matt Nelson (12) (Grabowski, Hallisey)
	4–2	59:50 – David Hallisey (18) (Becker, Nelson)

16 min
Penalties
27 min
28
Shots
25

March 24, 2018; 7:00 pm	(2) Denver	5 – 1 (2–0, 2–0, 1–1)	(3) Penn State	PPL Center, Allentown, Pennsylvania; Attendance: 7,491

Game reference

Tanner Jaillet
Goalies
Peyton Jones
Referees:
Peter Feola
Robert St. Lawrence
Linesmen:
Jim Briggs
Ryan Knapp

Kohen Olischefski (7) (Finlay, Mitchell) – 12:19	1–0
Troy Terry (14) (Gambrell, Plant) – GW EA – 16:40	2–0
Henrik Borgström (23) (Terry, Mitchell) – 24:51	3–0
Jarid Lukosevicius (20) (Mitchell, Borgström) – 39:57	4–0
	4–1	47:39 – Liam Folkes (13) (unassisted)
Jarid Lukosevicius (20) (Terry) – 52:22	5–1

8 min
Penalties
6 min
42
Shots
27

==== Regional Final ====
March 25, 2018; 6:30 pm	(1) Ohio State	5 – 1 (0–0, 2–0, 3–1)	(2) Denver	PPL Center, Allentown, Pennsylvania; Attendance: 5,124

Game reference

Sean Romeo
Goalies
Tanner Jaillet
Referees:
Kevin Shea
Jamie Koharski
Linesmen:
Tom George
Steven Murray

Dakota Joshua (15) (Kearney, Parran) – 23:47	1–0
Kevin Miller (7) (Lampasso, Joyaux) – GW – 35:31	2–0
Matt Joyaux (2) (Laczynski) – 49:27	3–0
	3–1	51:21 – Tyson McLellan (3) (Mitchell, Terry)
Kevin Miller (8) (Lampasso, Hein) – 51:51	4–1
Mason Jobst (21) (unassisted) – 54:16	5–1

4 min
Penalties
0 min
24
Shots
31

=== Frozen Four – Xcel Energy Center, St. Paul, Minnesota ===
==== National semifinal ====
April 5, 2018; 8:45 pm ESPN2	(E1) Notre Dame	4 – 3 (0–1, 2–1, 2–1)	(NE2) Michigan	Xcel Energy Center, St. Paul, Minnesota; Attendance: 18,026

Game reference

Cale Morris
Goalies
Hayden Lavigne
Referees:
Geno Binda
Nick Krebsbach
Linesmen:
Sterling Egan
John Philo

	0–1	08:19 – Tony Calderone (25) (Dancs, Marody)
	0–2	20:17 – Dexter Dancs (12) (Calderone, Cecconi)
Andrew Oglevie (14) (Evans, Gross) – PP – 22:41	1–2
Jake Evans (12) (Gross) – 26:20	2–2
Cal Burke (14) (Malmquist, Oglevie) – 41:35	3–2
	3–3	54:38 – Michael Pastujov (25) (Becker, N. Pastujov)
Jake Evans (13) (Morrison, Jenkins) – GW – 59:54	4–3

8 min
Penalties
6 min
29
Shots
28

April 5, 2018; 5:00 pm ESPN2	(MW1) Ohio State	1 – 2 (0–2, 0–0, 1–0)	(W3) Minnesota–Duluth	Xcel Energy Center, St. Paul, Minnesota; Attendance: 18,026

Game reference

Sean Romeo
Goalies
Hunter Shepard
Referees:
Jamie Koharski
Kevin Shea
Linesmen:
Tommy George
Steven Murray

	0–1	01:53 – Louie Roehl (3) (M. Anderson, Mackay)
	0–2	03:04 – GW – Jared Thomas (10) (Kuhlman)
Tanner Laczynski (17) (Joshua, Ege) – PP – 49:27	1–2

6 min
Penalties
10 min
20
Shots
28

=== 2018 National Championship ===
==== (E1) Notre Dame vs. (W3) Minnesota–Duluth ====
April 7	Notre Dame	1 – 2	Minnesota–Duluth	Xcel Energy Center	Recap

Scoring summary
Period	Team	Goal	Assist(s)	Time	Score
1st	UMD	Karson Kuhlman (13)	Miller	9:06	1–0 UMD
1st	UMD	Jared Thomas (11) – GW	Kuhlman	18:39	2–0 UMD
2nd	ND	Andrew Oglevie (15) – PP	Morrison and Evans	27:40	2–1 UMD
3rd	None				
Penalty summary
Period	Team	Player	Penalty	Time	PIM
1st	ND	Mike O'Leary	Hooking	19:42	2:00
2nd	ND	Jordan Gross	Tripping	22:19	2:00
2nd	UMD	Louie Roehl	Interference	24:35	2:00
2nd	UMD	Scott Perunovich	Interference	27:08	2:00
2nd	ND	Colin Theisen	Kneeing	30:02	2:00

Shots by period
Team	1	2	3	T
Minnesota–Duluth	10	18	7	35
Notre Dame	7	8	5	20

Goaltenders
Team	Name	Saves	Goals against	Time on ice
UMD	Hunter Shepard	19	1	59:26
ND	Cale Morris	33	2	58:32

== All-Tournament team ==
- G: Hunter Shepard (Minnesota–Duluth)
- D: Scott Perunovich (Minnesota–Duluth)
- D: Jordan Gross (Notre Dame)
- F: Karson Kuhlman* (Minnesota–Duluth)
- F: Jared Thomas (Minnesota–Duluth)
- F: Andrew Oglevie (Notre Dame)

* Most Outstanding Player(s)

== Record by conference ==
Conference	# of Bids	Record	Win %	Regional Finals	Frozen Four	Championship Game	Champions
Big Ten	4	7-4	.636	3	3	1	-
NCHC	3	5-2	.714	2	1	1	1
Hockey East	3	2-3	.400	2	-	-	-
ECAC Hockey	3	0-3	.000	-	-	-	-
WCHA	2	0-2	.000	-	-	-	-
Atlantic Hockey	1	1-1	.500	1	-	-	-

== Media ==
=== Television ===
ESPN has US television rights to all games during the tournament for the fourteenth consecutive year. ESPN will air every game, beginning with the regionals, on ESPN, ESPN2, ESPNews, ESPNU, or ESPN3 and streamed them online via WatchESPN.

In Canada, the tournament will be broadcast by TSN and streamed on TSN Go.

In the UK, the tournament will be broadcast by BT Sport ESPN.

==== Broadcast assignments ====
Regionals

- East Regional: John Buccigross, Barry Melrose and Quint Kessenich – Bridgeport, Connecticut
- West Regional: Clay Matvick and Sean Ritchlin – Sioux Falls, South Dakota
- Northeast Regional: Joe Beninati and Billy Jaffe – Worcester, Massachusetts
- Midwest Regional: Kevin Brown and Colby Cohen – Allentown, Pennsylvania

Frozen Four

- John Buccigross, Barry Melrose, and Quint Kessenich – St. Paul, Minnesota

=== Radio ===
Westwood One has exclusive radio rights to the Frozen Four and will air both the semifinals and the championship.

- Brian Tripp, Pat Micheletti, and Shireen Saski
