= 2018 NCHC Tournament =

2018 NCHC Men's ice hockey tournament
- Dates: March 9–17, 2018
- Teams: 8
- Finals site: Xcel Energy Center; Saint Paul, Minnesota
- Champions: Denver Pioneers (2nd title)
- Winning coach: Jim Montgomery (2nd title)
- MVP: Tanner Jaillet (Denver)
- NCHC Men's Ice Hockey Tournaments

The 2018 NCHC Tournament was the fifth tournament in league history. It was played between March 9 and March 17, 2018. Quarterfinal games were played at home team campus sites, while the final four games were played at the Xcel Energy Center in Saint Paul, Minnesota. By winning the tournament, Denver received the NCHC's automatic bid to the 2018 NCAA Division I Men's Ice Hockey Tournament.

== Format ==
The first round of the postseason tournament features a best-of-three games format. All eight conference teams participate in the tournament. Teams are seeded No. 1 through No. 8 according to their final conference standing, with a tiebreaker system used to seed teams with an identical number of points accumulated. The top four seeded teams each earn home ice and host one of the lower seeded teams.

The winners of the first round series advance to the Xcel Energy Center for the NCHC Frozen Faceoff. The Frozen Faceoff uses a single-elimination format. Teams are re-seeded No. 1 through No. 4 according to the final regular season conference standings.

=== Conference standings ===
Note: GP = Games played; W = Wins; L = Losses; T = Ties; PTS = Points; GF = Goals For; GA = Goals Against

2017–18 National Collegiate Hockey Conference standings
	Conference record								Overall record					
	GP	W	L	T	SOW	PTS	GF	GA	GP	W	L	T	GF	GA
#6 St. Cloud State †	24	16	4	4	1	53	93	59	40	25	9	6	144	101
#5 Denver*	24	12	6	6	4	46	76	53	41	23	10	8	135	86
#1 Minnesota–Duluth	24	13	11	0	0	39	79	56	42	25	16	3	132	92
#17 North Dakota	24	8	10	6	3	33	71	68	40	17	13	10	117	95
Omaha	24	10	13	1	0	31	75	97	36	17	17	2	121	134
Western Michigan	24	10	13	1	0	31	82	94	36	15	19	2	115	129
Colorado College	24	8	12	4	3	31	63	85	37	15	17	5	99	121
Miami	24	6	14	4	2	24	62	89	37	12	20	5	103	128
Championship: March 17, 2018 † indicates conference regular season champion; * indicates conference tournament champion Rankings: USCHO.com Top 20 Poll; updated March 5, 2018

== Bracket ==
Teams are reseeded after the first round

Quarterfinals; March 9–11
1	St. Cloud State	5	2	4*
8	Miami	2	3*	3
2	Denver	0	3	6
7	Colorado College	2	2	1
(Pairings are reseeded after the first round)
3	Minnesota-Duluth	5	2	—
6	Western Michigan	0	0	—
4	North Dakota	4	4*	—
5	Omaha	0	3	—

Semifinals; March 16
1	St. Cloud State	3*
4	North Dakota	2
2	Denver	3
3	Minnesota-Duluth	1

Championship; March 17
1	St. Cloud State	1
2	Denver	4
Third Place
3	Minnesota-Duluth	1
4	North Dakota	4

* denotes overtime periods

== Results ==
All times are local.

=== Quarterfinals ===
==== (1) St. Cloud State vs. (8) Miami ====
March 9	St. Cloud State	5 – 2	Miami	Herb Brooks National Hockey Center	Recap
(Winiecki, Benson) Jack Ahcan - 06:02		First period	15:28 - Kiefer Sherwood (Hutton, Belpedio)
(Jackson, Brodzinski) Jimmy Schuldt - PP - 06:11 (unassisted) Blake Lizotte - GW - 15:14		Second period	No scoring
(Jackson, Borgen) Easton Brodzinski - PP - 11:39 (Fitzgerald, Ahcan) Mikey Eyssimont - EN - 18:50		Third period	04:26 - Gordie Green (Sherwood, Hutton)
( 24 saves / 26 shots ) Dávid Hrenák		Goalie stats	Ryan Larkin ( 24 saves / 28 shots )

March 10	St. Cloud State	2 – 3	OT	Miami	Herb Brooks National Hockey Center	Recap
No Scoring		First period		01:54 - Josh Melnick (Mahalak, Sherwood); 17:33 - Grant Hutton (Sherwood, Mahalak)
(Eyssimont, Jackson) Ryan Poehling - PP - 07:20		Second period		No scoring
(Ahcan, B. Lizotte) Blake Winiecki - PP - 02:43		Third period		No scoring
No scoring		First overtime period		07:10 - GW - Grant Hutton (Belpedio, Knies)
( 17 saves / 20 shots ) Dávid Hrenák		Goalie stats		Ryan Larkin ( 30 saves / 32 shots )

March 11	St. Cloud State	4 – 3	OT	Miami	Herb Brooks National Hockey Center	Recap
No Scoring		First period		09:31 - Grant Hutton (Sherwood, Green); 16:22 - PP - Casey Gilling (Dornbrock, Mahalak)
(Jackson, Eyssimont) Jimmy Schuldt - 01:26 (Ahcan) Mikey Eyssimont - 18:13		Second period		01:31 - Karch Bachman (LaValle)
(J. Lizotte, Borgen) Judd Peterson - PP - 14:08		Third period		No scoring
(Newell, Ahcan) Mikey Eyssimont - GW - 08:14		First overtime period		No scoring
( 17 saves / 20 shots ) Dávid Hrenák		Goalie stats		Ryan Larkin ( 30 saves / 32 shots )

St. Cloud State won series 2–1

==== (2) Denver vs. (7) Colorado College ====
March 9	Denver	0 – 2	Colorado College	Magness Arena	Recap
No Scoring		First period	No scoring
No scoring		Second period	No scoring
No scoring		Third period	05:07 - GW PP - Westin Michaud (Blumenschein, Halloran); 09:27 - Mason Bergh (Bradley, McCaskill)
( 21 saves / 23 shots ) Tanner Jaillet		Goalie stats	Alex Leclerc ( 37 saves / 37 shots )

March 10	Denver	3 – 2	Colorado College	Magness Arena	Recap
No Scoring		First period	16:41 - SH - Trey Bradley (unassisted)
(Mitchell, Lukosevicius) Henrik Borgström - PP - 02:06		Second period	17:40 - Kristian Blumenschein (Bradley, Bergh)
(Lukosevicius, Borgström) Troy Terry - 02:17 (Mitchell, Hillman) Troy Terry - GW - 14:29		Third period	No scoring
( 25 saves / 27 shots ) Tanner Jaillet		Goalie stats	Alex Leclerc ( 46 saves / 49 shots )

March 11	Denver	6 – 1	Colorado College	Magness Arena	Recap
(Staub, Hillman) Logan O'Connor - 05:11 (Terry) Tariq Hammond - GW - 15:57		First period	No scoring
(Terry, Borgström) Jarid Lukosevicius - 06:33 (Terry) Henrik Borgström - 14:40 (Lukosevicius, Hammond) Liam Finlay - 14:58		Second period	No scoring
(Terry, Borgström) Jarid Lukosevicius - 08:51		Third period	07:35 - Mason Bergh (Bradley, Williams)
( 18 saves / 18 shots ) Tanner Jaillet / ( 9 saves / 10 shots ) Devin Cooley		Goalie stats	Alex Leclerc ( 25 saves / 29 shots ) / Alec Calvaruso ( 9 saves / 11 shots )

Denver won series 2–1

==== (3) Minnesota–Duluth vs. (6) Western Michigan ====
March 9	Minnesota–Duluth	5 – 0	Western Michigan	AMSOIL Arena	Recap
(Swaney, Samberg) Avery Peterson - GW PP - 04:55 (Anderson, Perunovich) Riley Tufte - PP - 14:08		First period	No scoring
(Anderson, Krieger) Scott Perunovich - 04:55 (Perunovich, Anderson) Peter Krieger - PP - 14:08		Second period	No scoring
(Exell, Wolff) Blake Young - 17:54		Third period	No scoring
( 26 saves / 26 shots ) Hunter Shepard		Goalie stats	Austin Cain ( 8 saves / 12 shots ) / Ben Blacker ( 11 saves / 12 shots )

March 10	Minnesota–Duluth	2 – 0	Western Michigan	AMSOIL Arena	Recap
(Exell, Miller) Louie Roehl - GW - 02:24		First period	No scoring
No scoring		Second period	No scoring
(unassisted) Jared Thomas - EN - 00:52		Third period	No scoring
( 19 saves / 19 shots ) Hunter Shepard		Goalie stats	Ben Blacker ( 23 saves / 24 shots )

Minnesota–Duluth won series 2–0

==== (4) North Dakota vs. (5) Omaha ====
March 9	North Dakota	4 – 0	Omaha	Ralph Engelstad Arena	Recap
(Poganski, Poolman) Shane Gersich - GW - 13:52		First period	No scoring
(Gardner, Poolman) Christian Wolanin - PP - 01:00 (Shaw) Nick Jones - 12:39 (unassisted) Joel Janatuinen - 16:39		Second period	No scoring
No scoring		Third period	No scoring
( 25 saves / 25 shots ) Cam Johnson		Goalie stats	Evan Weninger ( 30 saves / 34 shots )

March 10	North Dakota	4 – 3	OT	Omaha	Ralph Engelstad Arena	Recap
(Smith, Simonson) Matt Kiersted - 10:13 (Olson, Wolanin) Dixon Bowen - 14:05		First period		15:28 - Teemu Pulkkinen (Buchta, Spinner)
No scoring		Second period		05:25 - Teemu Pulkkinen (Vesel, Jones)
(Poolman, Shaw) Nick Jones - 10:14		Third period		05:41 - Jake Randolph (Alferd, Pope)
(Kawaguchi, Poolman) Nick Jones - GW - 00:53		First overtime period		No scoring
( 18 saves / 21 shots ) Cam Johnson		Goalie stats		Evan Weninger ( 29 saves / 33 shots )

North Dakota won series 2–0

=== Semifinals ===
==== (1) St. Cloud State vs. (4) North Dakota ====
March 16	St. Cloud State	3 – 2	OT	North Dakota	Xcel Energy Center	Recap
(Ahcan, B. Lizotte) Patrick Newell - 05:54		First period		No scoring
(unassisted) Easton Brodzinski - 05:53		Second period		04:39 - Nick Jones (Olson, Poolman)
No scoring		Third period		10:10 - PP - Jordan Kawaguchi (Olson, Jones)
(unassisted) Nick Poehling - GW - 01:47		First overtime period		No scoring
( 21 saves / 23 shots ) Dávid Hrenák		Goalie stats		Cam Johnson ( 31 saves / 34 shots )

==== (2) Denver vs. (3) Minnesota–Duluth ====
March 16	Denver	3 – 1	Minnesota–Duluth	Xcel Energy Center	Recap
(Mitchell, Terry) Henrik Borgström - 08:55		First period	No scoring
(O'Connor, Davies) Colin Staub - GW - 04:22		Second period	01:37 - Scott Perunovich (Anderson, Thomas)
(O'Connor) Adam Plant - PP EN - 19:11		Third period	No scoring
( 24 saves / 25 shots ) Tanner Jaillet		Goalie stats	Hunter Shepard ( 16 saves / 18 shots )

=== Third place ===
==== (3) Minnesota–Duluth vs. (4) North Dakota ====
March 17	Minnesota–Duluth	1 – 4	North Dakota	Xcel Energy Center	Recap
No Scoring		First period	07:22 - Austin Poganski (Jones)
No scoring		Second period	07:22 - GW - Joel Janatuinen (Poolman)
(Samberg, Exell) Mikey Anderson - SH - 16:37		Third period	15:51 - PP - Shane Gersich (Hoff, Poganski); 19:04 - PP - Ludvig Hoff (Wolanin, Kawaguchi)
( 27 saves / 31 shots ) Hunter Shepard		Goalie stats	Cam Johnson ( 27 saves / 28 shots )

=== Championship ===
==== (1) St. Cloud State vs. (2) Denver ====
March 17	St. Cloud State	1 – 4	Denver	Xcel Energy Center	Recap
No Scoring		First period	04:24 - Kohen Olischefski (Barrow, Mitchell); 19:54 - GW - Jake Durflinger (O'Connor)
No scoring		Second period	02:06 - Ryan Barrow (Finlay, Olischefski)
(Fitzgerald) Ryan Poehling - 15:54		Third period	17:06 - Dylan Gambrell (unassisted)
( 10 saves / 13 shots ) Dávid Hrenák / ( 13 saves / 14 shots ) Jeff Smith		Goalie stats	Tanner Jaillet ( 19 saves / 23 shots )

== Tournament awards ==
=== Frozen Faceoff All-Tournament Team ===
- F Henrik Borgström (Denver)
- F Nick Poehling (St. Cloud State)
- F Logan O'Connor (Denver)
- D Ian Mitchell (Denver)
- D Jack Ahcan (St. Cloud State)
- G Tanner Jaillet* (Denver)

* Most Valuable Player(s)
