= 2017–18 NCAA Division I men's ice hockey season =

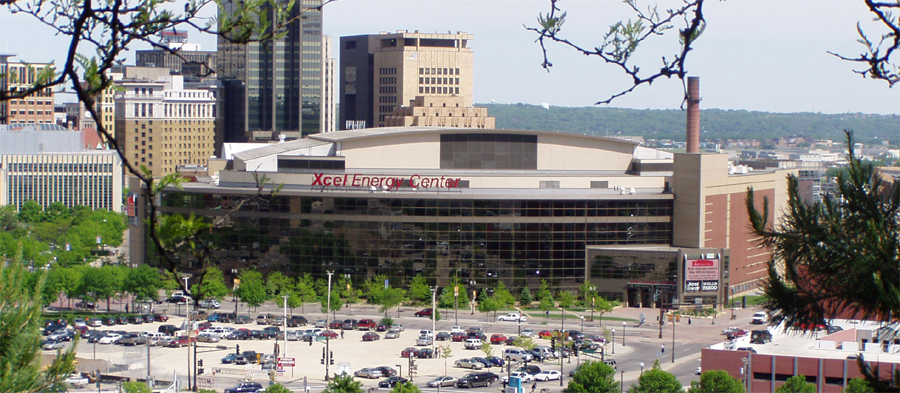
- The Xcel Energy Center in Saint Paul, Minnesota hosted the 2018 Frozen Four
- Duration: October 1, 2017– April 7, 2018
- NCAA tournament: 2018
- National championship: Xcel Energy Center; St. Paul, Minnesota
- NCAA champion: Minnesota–Duluth
- Hobey Baker Award: Adam Gaudette (Northeastern)

The 2017–18 NCAA Division I men's ice hockey season began in October 2017 and ended with the Frozen Four in April 2018. This was the 71st season in which an NCAA ice hockey championship was held, and US college hockey's 124th year overall.

== Conference realignment ==
The only conference change for 2017-18 was that Notre Dame moved from Hockey East to the Big Ten as an associate member for men's hockey.

School	Former Conference	New Conference
Notre Dame Fighting Irish	Hockey East	Big Ten

== Regular season ==
=== Standings ===
- 2017–18 Atlantic Hockey men's standings
  	Conference record							Overall record					
  	GP	W	L	T	PTS	GF	GA	GP	W	L	T	GF	GA
  Mercyhurst†	28	16	8	4	36	90	81	37	21	12	4	124	111
  Canisius	28	17	11	0	34	94	76	38	19	17	2	117	108
  Holy Cross	28	12	10	6	30	80	70	36	13	16	7	97	100
  Army	28	12	10	6	30	80	70	36	15	15	6	93	91
  #14 Air Force *	28	13	11	4	30	73	64	43	23	15	5	115	94
  RIT	28	13	14	1	27	91	90	37	15	20	2	114	127
  Robert Morris	28	12	13	3	27	79	78	41	18	20	3	119	118
  American International	28	11	13	4	26	63	75	39	15	20	4	88	116
  Niagara	28	10	15	3	23	76	90	36	11	22	3	93	123
  Bentley	28	9	14	5	23	72	87	37	13	18	6	96	114
  Sacred Heart	28	9	15	4	22	79	96	39	13	22	4	107	135
  Championship: March 17, 2018 † indicates conference regular season champion * indicates conference tournament champion (Riley Trophy); Rankings: USCHO.com Top 20 Poll; updated March 5, 2018
- 2017–18 Big Ten ice hockey standings
  	Conference record								Overall record					
  	GP	W	L	T	SOW	PTS	GF	GA	GP	W	L	T	GF	GA
  #2 Notre Dame†*	24	17	6	1	1	53	66	47	40	28	10	2	117	87
  #3 Ohio State	24	14	8	2	1	45	77	55	41	26	10	5	131	85
  #4 Michigan	24	11	10	3	2	38	70	72	40	22	15	3	136	121
  #13 Penn State	24	9	10	5	2	34	70	72	38	18	15	5	138	120
  #18 Minnesota	24	10	12	2	1	33	65	69	38	19	17	2	102	100
  Wisconsin	24	8	13	3	1	28	69	83	37	14	19	4	115	124
  Michigan State	24	6	16	2	1	21	53	77	36	12	22	2	91	117
  Championship: March 17, 2018 † indicates conference regular season champion * indicates conference tournament champion Rankings: USCHO.com Top 20 Poll; updated March 12, 2018
- 2017–18 NCAA Division I Independent ice hockey standings
  	Overall record					
  	GP	W	L	T	GF	GA
  Arizona State	34	8	21	5	77	123
  Rankings: USCHO.com Top 20 Poll; updated April 20, 2018
- 2017–18 ECAC Hockey men's standings
  	Conference record							Overall record					
  	GP	W	L	T	PTS	GF	GA	GP	W	L	T	GF	GA
  #8 Cornell†	22	17	3	2	36	61	32	33	25	6	2	102	52
  Union	22	16	5	1	33	70	48	38	21	15	2	115	98
  #12 Clarkson	22	12	5	5	29	74	49	40	23	11	6	122	75
  Harvard	22	11	8	3	25	68	50	33	15	14	4	104	85
  Dartmouth	22	11	10	1	23	55	69	35	16	17	2	83	107
  Colgate	22	10	9	3	23	49	46	40	17	17	6	87	88
  #15 Princeton*	22	10	10	2	22	77	79	36	19	13	4	131	110
  Yale	22	10	11	1	21	67	59	31	15	15	1	87	88
  Quinnipiac	22	9	11	2	20	59	56	38	16	18	4	105	106
  Brown	22	7	14	1	15	45	63	31	8	19	4	67	104
  Rensselaer	22	4	16	2	10	45	86	37	6	27	4	73	129
  St. Lawrence	22	3	18	1	7	43	76	37	8	27	2	80	122
  Championship: March 17, 2018 † indicates conference regular season champion (Cleary Cup) * indicates conference tournament champion (Whitelaw Cup); Rankings: USCHO.com Top 20 Poll; updated February 26, 2018
- 2017–18 Hockey East men's standings
  	Conference record							Overall record					
  	GP	W	L	T	PTS	GF	GA	GP	W	L	T	GF	GA
  #19 Boston College†	24	18	6	0	36	79	53	37	20	14	3	108	99
  #11 Northeastern	24	15	6	3	33	79	49	38	23	10	5	136	81
  #7 Providence	24	13	7	4	30	70	50	40	24	12	4	117	85
  #10 Boston University*	24	12	8	4	28	72	60	40	22	14	4	124	105
  Connecticut	24	11	12	1	23	70	62	36	15	19	2	100	102
  Maine	24	10	11	3	23	65	74	38	18	16	4	117	115
  Massachusetts–Lowell	24	11	13	0	22	68	75	36	17	19	0	101	99
  Massachusetts	24	9	13	2	20	60	74	39	17	20	2	104	119
  Vermont	24	6	12	6	18	51	75	37	10	20	7	79	112
  Merrimack	24	7	15	2	16	51	70	37	12	21	4	83	105
  New Hampshire	24	5	14	5	15	48	71	36	10	20	6	88	104
  Championship: March 17, 2018 † indicates conference regular season champion; * indicates conference tournament champion Rankings: USCHO.com Top 20 Poll; updated March 1, 2018
- 2017–18 National Collegiate Hockey Conference standings
  	Conference record								Overall record					
  	GP	W	L	T	SOW	PTS	GF	GA	GP	W	L	T	GF	GA
  #6 St. Cloud State †	24	16	4	4	1	53	93	59	40	25	9	6	144	101
  #5 Denver*	24	12	6	6	4	46	76	53	41	23	10	8	135	86
  #1 Minnesota–Duluth	24	13	11	0	0	39	79	56	42	25	16	3	132	92
  #17 North Dakota	24	8	10	6	3	33	71	68	40	17	13	10	117	95
  Omaha	24	10	13	1	0	31	75	97	36	17	17	2	121	134
  Western Michigan	24	10	13	1	0	31	82	94	36	15	19	2	115	129
  Colorado College	24	8	12	4	3	31	63	85	37	15	17	5	99	121
  Miami	24	6	14	4	2	24	62	89	37	12	20	5	103	128
  Championship: March 17, 2018 † indicates conference regular season champion; * indicates conference tournament champion Rankings: USCHO.com Top 20 Poll; updated March 5, 2018
- 2017–18 Western Collegiate Hockey Association standings
  	Conference record								Overall record					
  	GP	W	L	T	SOW	PTS	GF	GA	GP	W	L	T	GF	GA
  #9 Minnesota State†	28	22	5	1	0	67	116	58	40	29	10	1	153	84
  #20 Northern Michigan	28	19	7	2	2	61	85	64	43	25	15	3	130	108
  Bowling Green	28	17	6	5	2	58	87	63	41	23	12	6	122	100
  Bemidji State	28	13	9	6	4	49	77	63	38	16	14	8	103	95
  #16 Michigan Tech*	28	12	11	5	2	43	82	75	44	22	17	5	134	117
  Ferris State	28	11	16	1	0	34	68	86	38	14	23	1	87	122
  Alabama–Huntsville	28	10	16	2	1	33	69	86	37	12	23	2	84	121
  Alaska	28	9	17	2	1	30	74	85	36	11	22	3	97	118
  Lake Superior State	28	8	17	3	0	27	59	90	36	10	22	4	76	121
  Alaska Anchorage	28	4	21	3	3	18	55	102	34	4	26	4	65	124
  Championship: March 17, 2018 † indicates conference regular season champion (MacNaughton Cup) * indicates conference tournament champion (Broadmoor Trophy); Rankings: USCHO.com Top 20 Poll; updated March 5, 2018

== 2018 NCAA tournament ==
Regional semifinals
1	St. Cloud State	1
4	Air Force	4
West Regional
2	Minnesota State	2
3	Minnesota–Duluth	3*
1	Ohio State	4
4	Princeton	2
Midwest Regional
2	Denver	5
3	Penn State	1
1	Cornell	1
4	Boston University	3
Northeast Regional
2	Michigan	3
3	Northeastern	2
1	Notre Dame	4*
4	Michigan Tech	3
East Regional
2	Providence	1
3	Clarkson	0

Regional Finals
4	Air Force	1
3	Minnesota–Duluth	2
1	Ohio State	5
2	Denver	1
4	Boston University	3
2	Michigan	6
1	Notre Dame	2
2	Providence	1

Frozen Four
W3	Minnesota-Duluth	2
MW1	Ohio State	1
NE2	Michigan	3
E1	Notre Dame	4

National championship
W3	Minnesota-Duluth	2
E1	Notre Dame	1

Note: * denotes overtime period(s)

== Player stats ==
=== Scoring leaders ===
GP = Games played; G = Goals; A = Assists; Pts = Points; PIM = Penalty minutes

Player	Class	Team	GP	G	A	Pts	PIM
Adam Gaudette	Junior	Northeastern	38	30	30	60	41
Max Véronneau	Junior	Princeton	36	17	38	55	12
Dylan Sikura	Senior	Northeastern	35	22	32	54	22
Ryan Kuffner	Junior	Princeton	36	29	23	52	6
Henrik Borgström	Sophomore	Denver	40	23	29	52	18
Cooper Marody	Junior	Michigan	40	16	35	51	24
Brady Ferguson	Senior	Robert Morris	41	18	31	49	20
Dylan McLaughlin	Junior	Canisius	37	17	31	48	10
Troy Terry	Junior	Denver	39	14	34	48	6
Adam Rockwood	Senior	Northern Michigan	43	8	40	48	18

=== Leading goaltenders ===
The following goaltenders lead the NCAA in goals against average while playing at least 33% of their team's total minutes.

GP = Games played; Min = Minutes played; W = Wins; L = Losses; T = Ties; GA = Goals against; SO = Shutouts; SV% = Save percentage; GAA = Goals against average

Player	Class	Team	GP	Min	W	L	T	GA	SO	SV%	GAA
Matthew Galajda	Freshman	Cornell	29	1669:20	21	5	2	42	9	.939	1.51
Colton Point	Sophomore	Colgate	33	1997:05	16	12	5	58	6	.944	1.74
Connor LaCouvee	Senior	Minnesota State	31	1800:13	23	6	1	54	3	.914	1.80
Jake Kielly	Sophomore	Clarkson	39	2336:59	22	11	6	71	8	.929	1.82
Tanner Jaillet	Senior	Denver	39	2293:26	22	9	7	72	5	.928	1.88
Hunter Shepard	Sophomore	Minnesota–Duluth	41	2392:49	25	14	1	76	8	.925	1.91
Cayden Primeau	Freshman	Northeastern	34	2004:32	19	8	5	64	4	.931	1.92
Cale Morris	Sophomore	Notre Dame	37	2192:43	27	8	1	71	4	.944	1.94
Corbin Kaczperski	Sophomore	Yale	12	684:31	7	4	0	23	0	.933	2.02
Dávid Hrenák	Freshman	St. Cloud State	24	1356:52	13	7	7	46	3	.922	2.03

== Awards ==
=== NCAA ===
Award		Recipient
Hobey Baker Award		Adam Gaudette, Northeastern
Spencer Penrose Award		Jeff Jackson, Notre Dame
Tim Taylor Award		Scott Perunovich, Minnesota–Duluth
Mike Richter Award		Cale Morris, Notre Dame
Derek Hines Unsung Hero Award		Dylan Abood, Air Force
Lowe's Senior CLASS Award		Jake Evans, Notre Dame
Tournament Most Outstanding Player		Karson Kuhlman, Minnesota–Duluth
AHCA All-American Teams
East First Team	Position	West First Team
Matthew Galajda, Cornell	G	Cale Morris, Notre Dame
Jérémy Davies, Northeastern	D	Scott Perunovich, Minnesota–Duluth
Adam Fox, Harvard	D	Jimmy Schuldt, St. Cloud State
Ryan Donato, Harvard	F	Henrik Borgström, Denver
Adam Gaudette, Northeastern	F	C. J. Suess, Minnesota State
Dylan Sikura, Northeastern	F	Troy Terry, Denver
East Second Team	Position	West Second Team
Colton Point, Colgate	G	Tanner Jaillet, Denver
Jacob Bryson, Providence	D	Philip Beaulieu, Northern Michigan
Kelly Summers, Clarkson	D	Alec Rauhauser, Bowling Green
Ryan Kuffner, Princeton	F	Nick Halloran, Colorado College
Sheldon Rempal, Clarkson	F	Tanner Laczynski, Ohio State
Max Veronneau, Princeton	F	Cooper Marody, Michigan

=== Atlantic Hockey ===
Award		Recipient
Player of the Year		Dylan McLaughlin, Cansius
Rookie of the Year		Brennan Kapcheck, American International
Best Defensive Forward		Jack Riley, Mercyhurst
Best Defenseman		Alexander Wilkinson, Army
Individual Sportsmanship Award		Bryan Sienerth, Mercyhurst
Regular Season Scoring Trophy		Dylan McLaughlin, Cansius
Regular Season Goaltending Award		Billy Christopoulos, Air Force
Coach of the Year		Rick Gotkin, Mercyhurst
Tournament MVP		Billy Christopoulos, Air Force
All-Atlantic Hockey Teams
First Team	Position	Second Team
Paul Berrafto, Holy Cross	G	Brandon Wildung, Mercyhurst
Alexander Wilkinson, Army	D	Joseph Duszak, Mercyhurst
Cameron Heath, Canisius	D	Lester Lancaster, Canisius
Dylan McLaughlin, Canisius	F	Jack Riley, Mercyhurst
Brady Ferguson, Robert Morris	F	Derek Barach, Mercyhurst
Erik Brown, RIT	F	Michael Wilson, Army
Third Team	Position	Rookie Team
Billy Christopoulos, Air Force	G	Stefano Durante, American International
Chase Norrish, RIT	D	Brennan Kapchek, American International
Jānis Jaks, American International	D	Jon Zimmerman, Army
Derian Plouffe, Niagara	F	Luke Santerno, Bentley
Ryan Schmelzer, Canisius	F	Grant Meyer, Canisius
Alex Tonge, Robert Morris	F	Marc Johnstone, Sacred Heart

=== Big Ten ===
Award		Recipient
Player of the Year		Cale Morris, Notre Dame
Defensive Player of the Year		Trevor Hamilton, Penn State
Goaltender of the Year		Cale Morris, Notre Dame
Freshman of the Year		Mitchell Lewandowski, Michigan State
Scoring Champion		Cooper Marody, Michigan
Coach of the Year		Steve Rohlik, Ohio State
Tournament Most Outstanding Player		Cale Morris, Notre Dame
All-Big Ten Teams
First Team	Position	Second Team
Cale Morris, Notre Dame	G	Sean Romeo, Ohio State
Jordan Gross, Notre Dame	D	Quinn Hughes, Michigan
Trevor Hamilton, Penn State	D	Sasha Larocque, Ohio State
Cooper Marody, Michigan	F	Tony Calderone, Michigan
Jake Evans, Notre Dame	F	Taro Hirose, Michigan State
Tanner Laczynski, Ohio State	F	Mason Jobst, Ohio State
Honorable Mention	Position	Freshman Team
Hayden Lavigne, Michigan	G	Tommy Napier, Ohio State
Carson Gatt, Michigan State	D	Quinn Hughes, Michigan
Ryan Lindgren, Minnesota	D	Wyatt Kalynuk, Wisconsin
Wyatt Kalynuk, Wisconsin	D	–
Peter Tischke, Wisconsin	D	–
Mitchell Lewandowski, Michigan State	F	Mitchell Lewandowski, Michigan State
Tyler Sheehy, Minnesota	F	Casey Mittelstadt, Minnesota
Matthew Weis, Ohio State	F	Linus Weissbach, Wisconsin
Andrew Sturtz, Penn State	F	–
Trent Frederic, Wisconsin	F	–

=== ECAC ===
Award		Recipient
Player of the Year		Ryan Donato, Harvard
Best Defensive Forward		Nico Sturm, Clarkson
Best Defensive Defenseman		Alec McCrea, Cornell
Rookie of the Year		Matthew Galajda, Cornell
Ken Dryden Award		Matthew Galajda, Cornell
Student-Athlete of the Year		Bo Pieper, Quinnipiac
Tim Taylor Award		Mike Schafer, Cornell
Most Outstanding Player in Tournament		Ryan Ferland, Princeton
All-ECAC Hockey Teams
First Team	Position	Second Team
Matthew Galajda, Cornell	G	Colton Point, Colgate
Adam Fox, Harvard	D	Terrance Amorosa, Clarkson
Kelly Summers, Clarkson	D	Chase Priskie, Quinnipiac
Ryan Donato, Harvard	F	Anthony Angello, Cornell
Sheldon Rempal, Clarkson	F	Ryan Kuffner, Princeton
Max Véronneau, Princeton	F	Joe Snively, Yale
Third Team	Position	Rookie Team
Jake Kielly, Clarkson	G	Matthew Galajda, Cornell
Jake Kupsky, Union	G	
Yanni Kaldis, Cornell	D	Nick Austin, Colgate
Josh Teves, Princeton	D	Reilly Walsh, Harvard
Ryan Scarfo, Union	F	Jack Badini, Harvard
Nico Sturm, Clarkson	F	Jack Jacome, Clarkson
Odeen Tufto, Quinnipiac	F	Odeen Tufto, Quinnipiac

=== Hockey East ===
Award		Recipient
Player of the Year		Adam Gaudette, Northeastern
Best Defensive Forward		Brian Pinho, Providence
Best Defensive Defenseman		Casey Fitzgerald, Boston College
Rookie of the Year		Logan Hutsko, Boston College
Goaltender of the Year		Cayden Primeau, Northeastern
Len Ceglarski Sportmanship Award		Jacob Bryson, Providence
Three Stars Award		Adam Gaudette, Northeastern
Scoring Champion		Adam Gaudette, Northeastern
Charlie Holt Team Sportsmanship Award		UMass Lowell
Bob Kullen Award (Coach of the Year)		Jerry York, Boston College
William Flynn Tournament Most Valuable Player		Jake Oettinger, Boston University
Hockey East All-Star Teams
First Team	Position	Second Team
Cayden Primeau, Northeastern	G	Hayden Hawkey, Providence
Jacob Bryson, Providence	D	Dante Fabbro, Boston University
Jérémy Davies, Northeastern	D	Casey Fitzgerald, Boston College
Erik Foley, Providence	F	Bobo Carpenter, Boston University
Adam Gaudette, Northeastern	F	Maxim Letunov, Connecticut
Dylan Sikura, Northeastern	F	Nolan Stevens, Northeastern
Third Team	Position	Rookie Team
Joseph Woll, Boston College	G	Cayden Primeau, Northeastern
	G	Jeremy Swayman, Maine
Michael Kim, Boston College	D	Mario Ferraro, Massachusetts
Cale Makar, Massachusetts	D	Cale Makar, Massachusetts
Brett Seney, Merrimack	F	Shane Bowers, Boston University
Brian Pinho, Providence	F	Logan Hutsko, Boston College
Jordan Greenway, Boston University	F	Brady Tkachuk, Boston University
Honorable Mention	Position	
Jeremy Swayman, Maine	G	
Tommy Panico, UMass Lowell	D	
Brandon Hickey, Boston University	D	
Jonny Austin, Connecticut	D	
Ross Colton, Vermont	F	
Shane Bowers, Boston University	F	
Spencer Naas, Connecticut	F	
Chase Pearson, Maine	F	

=== NCHC ===
Award		Recipient
Player of the Year		Henrik Borgström, Denver
Rookie of the Year		Scott Perunovich, Minnesota–Duluth
Goaltender of the Year		Tanner Jaillet, Denver
Forward of the Year		Henrik Borgström, Denver
Defensive Defenseman of the Year		Will Borgen, St. Cloud State
Offensive Defenseman of the Year		Scott Perunovich, Minnesota–Duluth
Defensive Forward of the Year		Rhett Gardner, North Dakota
Scholar-Athlete of the Year		Tyler Vesel, Omaha
Three Stars Award		Nick Halloran, Colorado College
Sportsmanship Award		Karson Kuhlman, Minnesota–Duluth
Herb Brooks Coach of the Year		Bob Motzko, St. Cloud State
Frozen Faceoff MVP		Tanner Jaillet, Denver
All-NCHC Teams
First Team	Position	Second Team
Tanner Jaillet, Denver	G	Hunter Shepard, Minnesota–Duluth
Jimmy Schuldt, St. Cloud State	D	Christian Wolanin, North Dakota
Scott Perunovich, Minnesota–Duluth	D	Louie Belpedio, Miami
Henrik Borgström, Denver	F	Mikey Eyssimont, St. Cloud State
Nick Halloran, Colorado College	F	Troy Terry, Denver
David Pope, Omaha	F	Dylan Gambrell, Denver
Honorable Mention	Position	Rookie Team
Dávid Hrenák, St. Cloud State	G	Dávid Hrenák, St. Cloud State
Will Borgen, St. Cloud State	D	Ian Mitchell, Denver
Colton Poolman, St. Cloud State	D	Scott Perunovich, Minnesota–Duluth
Wade Allison, Western Michigan	F	Blake Lizotte, St. Cloud State
Mason Bergh, Colorado College	F	Grant Mismash, North Dakota
Dawson DiPietro, Western Michigan	F	Easton Brodzinski, St. Cloud State
Robby Jackson, St. Cloud State	F	

=== WCHA ===
Award		Recipient
Player of the Year		C. J. Suess, Minnesota State
Outstanding Student-Athlete of the Year		Olivier Mantha, Alaska Anchorage
Defensive Player of the Year		Alec Rauhauser, Bowling Green
Rookie of the Year		Jake Jaremko, Minnesota State
Scoring Champion		C. J. Suess, Minnesota State
Goaltender of the Year		Atte Tolvanen, Northern Michigan
Coach of the Year		Grant Potulny, Northern Michigan
Most Valuable Player in Tournament		Patrick Munson, Michigan Tech
All-WCHA Hockey Teams
First Team	Position	Second Team
Atte Tolvanen, Northern Michigan	G	Michael Bitzer, Bemidji State
Zach Frye, Alaska	D	Daniel Brickley, Minnesota State
Alec Rauhauser, Bowling Green	D	Philip Beaulieu, Northern Michigan
C. J. Suess, Minnesota State	F	Mitch McLain, Bowling Green
Marc Michaelis, Minnesota State	F	Adam Rockwood, Northern Michigan
Troy Loggins, Northern Michigan	F	Josh Kestner, Alabama–Huntsville
Third Team	Position	Rookie Team
Connor LaCouvee, Minnesota State	G	Eric Dop, Bowling Green
Ian Scheid, Minnesota State	D	Connor Mackey, Minnesota State
Ryker Killins, Ferris State	D	Eric Sinclair, Alaska Anchorage
Mitch Reinke, Michigan Tech	D	–
Zeb Knutson, Minnesota State	F	Jake Jaremko, Minnesota State
Darien Craighead, Northern Michigan	F	Brandon Kruse, Bowling Green
Robbie Payne, Northern Michigan	F	Steven Jandric, Alaska
–	F	Max Johnson, Bowling Green
–	F	Reggie Lutz, Minnesota State

=== Hobey Baker Award ===
Hobey Baker Award Finalists
Player	Position	School
Henrik Borgström	Forward	Denver
Ryan Donato	Forward	Harvard
Matthew Galajda	Goaltender	Cornell
Adam Gaudette	Forward	Northeastern
Dylan McLaughlin	Forward	Canisius
Cale Morris	Goaltender	Notre Dame
Colton Point	Goaltender	Colgate
Jimmy Schuldt	Defenseman	St. Cloud State
Dylan Sikura	Forward	Northeastern
C. J. Suess	Forward	Minnesota State

Bold names are Hobey "Hat-trick" finalists

=== Mike Richter Award ===
Mike Richter Award Finalists
Player	School
Matthew Galajda	Cornell
Tanner Jaillet	Denver
Cale Morris	Notre Dame
Colton Point	Colgate
Cayden Primeau	Northeastern

== 2018 NHL entry draft ==
Round	Pick	Player	College	Conference	NHL team
1	4	Brady Tkachuk	Boston University	Hockey East	Ottawa Senators
1	7	Quinn Hughes	Michigan	Big Ten	Vancouver Canucks
1	11	Oliver Wahlstrom ^{†}	Boston College	Hockey East	New York Islanders
1	14	Joel Farabee ^{†}	Boston University	Hockey East	Philadelphia Flyers
1	19	Jay O'Brien ^{†}	Providence	Hockey East	Philadelphia Flyers
1	22	K'Andre Miller ^{†}	Wisconsin	Big Ten	New York Rangers
1	26	Jacob Bernard-Docker ^{†}	North Dakota	NCHC	Ottawa Senators
2	32	Mattias Samuelsson ^{†}	Western Michigan	NCHC	Buffalo Sabres
2	42	Jack Drury ^{†}	Harvard	ECAC Hockey	Carolina Hurricanes
2	43	Ruslan Iskhakov ^{†}	Connecticut	Hockey East	New York Islanders
2	45	Scott Perunovich	Minnesota–Duluth	NCHC	St. Louis Blues
2	48	Jonathan Tychonick ^{†}	North Dakota	NCHC	Ottawa Senators
3	63	Jack McBain ^{†}	Boston College	Hockey East	Minnesota Wild
3	68	Tyler Madden ^{†}	Northeastern	Hockey East	Vancouver Canucks
3	69	Jake Wise ^{†}	Boston University	Hockey East	Chicago Blackhawks
3	71	Jordan Harris ^{†}	Northeastern	Hockey East	Montreal Canadiens
3	73	Ty Emberson ^{†}	Wisconsin	Big Ten	Arizona Coyotes
3	78	Sampo Ranta ^{†}	Minnesota	Big Ten	Colorado Avalanche
3	79	Blake McLaughlin ^{†}	Minnesota	Big Ten	Anaheim Ducks
3	81	Seth Barton ^{†}	Massachusetts–Lowell	Hockey East	New York Islanders
3	89	Logan Hutsko ^{†}	Boston College	Hockey East	Florida Panthers
3	91	Nathan Smith ^{†}	Minnesota State	WCHA	Winnipeg Jets
4	95	Jonathan Gruden ^{†}	Miami	NCHC	Ottawa Senators
4	99	Slava Demin ^{†}	Denver	NCHC	Vegas Golden Knights
4	102	Jasper Weatherby ^{†}	North Dakota	NCHC	San Jose Sharks
4	103	Jacob Pivonka ^{†}	Notre Dame	Big Ten	New York Islanders
4	105	Martin Pospíšil ^{†}	St. Lawrence	ECAC Hockey	Calgary Flames
4	108	Demetrios Koumontzis ^{†}	Arizona State	Independent	Calgary Flames
4	109	Tyler Weiss ^{†}	Omaha	NCHC	Colorado Avalanche
4	111	Jáchym Kondelík ^{†}	Connecticut	Hockey East	Nashville Predators
4	112	Jack St. Ivany ^{†}	Yale	ECAC Hockey	Philadelphia Flyers
4	115	Paul Cotter ^{†}	Western Michigan	NCHC	Vegas Golden Knights
4	116	Jack Perbix ^{†}	Minnesota	Big Ten	Anaheim Ducks
4	119	Curtis Hall ^{†}	Yale	ECAC Hockey	Boston Bruins
4	121	Alex Green	Cornell	ECAC Hockey	Tampa Bay Lightning
4	123	Jack Gorniak ^{†}	Wisconsin	Big Ten	Montreal Canadiens
4	124	Mitchell Gibson ^{†}	Harvard	ECAC Hockey	Washington Capitals
5	126	Angus Crookshank ^{†}	New Hampshire	Hockey East	Ottawa Senators
5	131	Spencer Stastney ^{†}	Notre Dame	Big Ten	Nashville Predators
5	135	Brandon Kruse	Bowling Green	WCHA	Vegas Golden Knights
5	138	Hugh McGing	Western Michigan	NCHC	St. Louis Blues
5	139	Mikael Hakkarainen ^{†}	Providence	Hockey East	Chicago Blackhawks
5	142	Michael Callahan ^{†}	Providence	Hockey East	Arizona Coyotes
5	144	Dávid Hrenák	St. Cloud State	NCHC	Los Angeles Kings
5	152	Magnus Chrona ^{†}	Denver	NCHC	Tampa Bay Lightning
6	164	Michael Kesselring ^{†}	Northeastern	Hockey East	Edmonton Oilers
6	167	Emilio Pettersen ^{†}	Denver	NCHC	Calgary Flames
6	174	Gavin Hain ^{†}	North Dakota	NCHC	Philadelphia Flyers
6	177	Liam Gorman	Princeton	ECAC Hockey	Pittsburgh Penguins
6	180	Peter DiLiberatore	Quinnipiac	ECAC Hockey	Vegas Golden Knights
6	181	Dustyn McFaul ^{†}	Clarkson	ECAC Hockey	Boston Bruins
6	182	John Leonard	Massachusetts	Hockey East	San Jose Sharks
6	183	Cole Koepke ^{†}	Minnesota–Duluth	NCHC	Tampa Bay Lightning
6	184	Jared Moe ^{†}	Minnesota	Big Ten	Winnipeg Jets
7	188	Jakov Novak ^{†}	Bentley	Atlantic Hockey	Ottawa Senators
7	190	Brett Stapley ^{†}	Denver	NCHC	Montreal Canadiens
7	192	Matthew Thiessen ^{†}	Maine	Hockey East	Vancouver Canucks
7	193	Josiah Slavin ^{†}	Colorado College	NCHC	Chicago Blackhawks
7	194	Luke Loheit ^{†}	Minnesota–Duluth	NCHC	Ottawa Senators
7	196	Christian Krygier ^{†}	Michigan State	Big Ten	New York Islanders
7	197	Jake Kucharski ^{†}	Providence	Hockey East	Carolina Hurricanes
7	201	Cole Krygier ^{†}	Michigan State	Big Ten	Florida Panthers
7	210	Sam Hentges ^{†}	St. Cloud State	NCHC	Minnesota Wild
7	214	Ty Taylor ^{†}	New Hampshire	Hockey East	Tampa Bay Lightning
7	215	Austin Wong ^{†}	Harvard	ECAC Hockey	Winnipeg Jets
7	216	Riley Hughes ^{†}	Northeastern	Hockey East	New York Rangers

† incoming freshman

== See also ==
- 2017–18 NCAA Division II men's ice hockey season
- 2017–18 NCAA Division III men's ice hockey season
