= NCHC Goaltender of the Year =

- Sport: College ice hockey
- League: NCHC

History
- First award: 2014
- Most wins: Tanner Jaillet (2); Hunter Shepard (2)
- Most recent: Jan Špunar

The NCHC Goaltender of the Year is an annual award given out at the conclusion of the National Collegiate Hockey Conference regular season to the best goalie in the conference as voted by the coaches of each NCHC team.

The Goaltender of the Year was first awarded in 2014 and is a successor to the CCHA Best Goaltender which was temporarily discontinued after the first iteration of the conference dissolved due to the 2013–14 NCAA conference realignment.

== Award winners ==
Year	Winner	School
2013–14	Sam Brittain	Denver
2014–15	Zane McIntyre	North Dakota
2015–16	Charlie Lindgren	St. Cloud State
2016–17	Tanner Jaillet	Denver
2017–18	Tanner Jaillet	Denver
2018–19	Hunter Shepard	Minnesota Duluth
2019–20	Hunter Shepard	Minnesota Duluth
2020–21	Adam Scheel	North Dakota
2021–22	Ryan Fanti	Minnesota Duluth
2022–23	Magnus Chrona	Denver
2023–24	Kaidan Mbereko	Colorado College
2024–25	Simon Latkoczy	Omaha
2025–26	Jan Špunar	North Dakota

=== Winners by school ===
School	Winners
Denver	4
Minnesota Duluth	3
North Dakota	3
Colorado College	1
Omaha	1
St. Cloud State	1

== See also ==
- NCHC Awards
- CCHA Best Goaltender
