= 2017–18 Minnesota–Duluth Bulldogs men's ice hockey season =

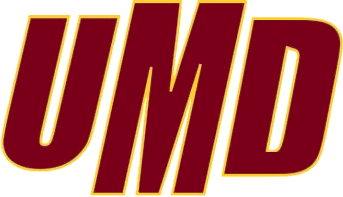

NCAA Division I champion 2017 Ledyard Bank Classic, champion 2018 NCAA Tournament, champion
- Conference: 3rd NCHC
- Home ice: AMSOIL Arena

Rankings
- #1: USA Today
- #1: USCHO.com

Record
- Overall: 25–16–3
- Conference: 13–11–0
- Home: 12–6–2
- Road: 8–8–1
- Neutral: 5–2

Coaches and captains
- Head coach: Scott Sandelin
- Captain: Karson Kuhlman
- Alternate captain: Parker Mackay

The 2017–18 Minnesota–Duluth Bulldogs men's ice hockey team represented the University of Minnesota Duluth in intercollegiate college ice hockey during the 2017–18 NCAA Division I men's ice hockey season. The head coach was Scott Sandelin and the team captain was Karson Kuhlman. The team won the 2018 NCAA Division I Men's Ice Hockey Tournament. The team's leading scorer was Scott Perunovich, who was only the fourth defencemen to lead a championship team in scoring (Bob Heathcott, 1952; Dan Lodboa, 1970; Craig Norwich, 1977).

== Season ==
Minnesota–Duluth was coming off a very successful season where they won the NCHC Tournament and finished as the National Runner-up. Unfortunately, the team lost five of its top six scorers in the offseason as well as their starting goaltender, Hunter Miska. Despite the roster turnover, the Bulldogs were ranked No. 6 in the preseason poll and opened their season by hosting the Ice Breaker Tournament. After winning against preseason No. 3 Minnesota Duluth stumbled, going 0–2–2 over its next four games. UMD was still trying to find its starting goaltender and after a 0–0 tie against Bemidji State it looked like Nick Deery had claimed the job but after surrendering 5 goals to the woeful Merrimack Warriors in the very next game Hunter Sheppard got the starting job once more. Sheppard would allow only 3 goals in the next three games (all Bulldog wins) and stake his claim in goal.

With the goaltending seemingly settled head coach Scott Sandelin now had to get his team to score. Over a five-week period in November and December, once the Bulldogs began their conference schedule, Minnesota–Duluth never scored more than three goals in a game and were shut out three times. UMD's record dipped below .500 and they were floundering at the bottom of their conference. Just before they went on winter break the Bulldogs exploded for 11 goals in two games against Omaha and, though they lost one of the games when Sheppard had his worst match of the year, the sudden offensive burst game the Bulldogs something to build on.

Just before the new year Minnesota–Duluth played in the Ledyard Bank Classic and after dropping Yale in the first game they faced host Dartmouth in the title match. Both teams fired over 40 shots at one another but the game ended in a 2–2 tie. A shootout was held to decide the champion (but did not count for official standings due to the NCAA not sanctioning shootouts) and the Bulldogs skated away with the title. Hunter Sheppard was named as the tournament MVP and used the mid-season championship as a springboard to help the team get back into playoff contention. UMD returned to their conference schedule in the second week of January and took two road games against Colorado College before hosting No. 7 North Dakota. The Bulldogs' power play came up big, notching three goals in each contest to help the team sweep the weekend and send UMD into the top ten for the first time since early November.

The success was short-lived, however, and Minnesota–Duluth lost four of their next five, including their fifth-straight to Denver. The team was shut out twice more over that stretch but recovered swiftly when they played Miami and Western Michigan, outscoring their opposition 21–1 over those four games. After splitting two games with Omaha Minnesota–Duluth ended the season with a 13–11 record in the NCHC, earning them the No. 3 seed in the conference tournament. UMD met Western Michigan in the quarterfinal and continued their recent dominance over the Broncos by shutting them out in both games to comfortably take the series. The Bulldogs headed to Saint Paul for the final four and promptly lost their fifth game of the year to Denver. The team followed that up with yet another loss in the Third place Game to North Dakota. Despite the disappointing finish Minnesota–Duluth finished 12th in the pairwise rankings, .0001 ahead of Minnesota, and received the final at-large bid in the NCAA tournament.

The Bulldogs got the No. 3 seed in the West Regional and were set against Minnesota State for a rubber match. The Mavericks scored twice early and appeared to be cruising to their first tournament win but the Bulldog defense clamped down thereafter, preventing Minnesota State from recording a shot in the second period while slowly chipping away at the lead. UMD tied the game late in the third on the power play and then won the game in overtime on a shot from Parker Mackay. Duluth continued its defensive play in the Regional Final against Air Force, outshooting the airmen 14–0 in the first while taking a 2–0 lead. The Falcons would eventually score late but the UMD would win the match 2–1.

The Bulldogs began their second straight frozen four against No. 5 Ohio State and continued their stingy defense. For the second time in as many games UMD scored twice in the first and then played back to halt the Buckeye attack. Ohio State could only manage 20 shots in the game with their lone goal coming in the third period on the power play. With only Notre Dame left in their way, the Bulldogs followed virtually the same script that had won them their previous two games; score twice in the first period then hold on for dear life. This time the opposing power play was able to score in the second period but even the No. 2 overall seed Fighting Irish couldn't manage more than 20 shots in the contest. The two teams played a clean third period and the Bulldogs skated away with their second national title.

Leading scorer Scott Perunovich won the Tim Taylor Award as the national rookie of the year while Karson Kuhlman was named as the NCAA Tournament Most Outstanding Player.

== Standings ==
2017–18 National Collegiate Hockey Conference standings
| | Conference record | | | | | | | | Overall record | | | | | |
| | GP | W | L | T | SOW | PTS | GF | GA | GP | W | L | T | GF | GA |
|---|---|---|---|---|---|---|---|---|---|---|---|---|---|---|
| #6 St. Cloud State † | 24 | 16 | 4 | 4 | 1 | 53 | 93 | 59 | 40 | 25 | 9 | 6 | 144 | 101 |
| #5 Denver* | 24 | 12 | 6 | 6 | 4 | 46 | 76 | 53 | 41 | 23 | 10 | 8 | 135 | 86 |
| #1 Minnesota–Duluth | 24 | 13 | 11 | 0 | 0 | 39 | 79 | 56 | 42 | 25 | 16 | 3 | 132 | 92 |
| #17 North Dakota | 24 | 8 | 10 | 6 | 3 | 33 | 71 | 68 | 40 | 17 | 13 | 10 | 117 | 95 |
| Omaha | 24 | 10 | 13 | 1 | 0 | 31 | 75 | 97 | 36 | 17 | 17 | 2 | 121 | 134 |
| Western Michigan | 24 | 10 | 13 | 1 | 0 | 31 | 82 | 94 | 36 | 15 | 19 | 2 | 115 | 129 |
| Colorado College | 24 | 8 | 12 | 4 | 3 | 31 | 63 | 85 | 37 | 15 | 17 | 5 | 99 | 121 |
| Miami | 24 | 6 | 14 | 4 | 2 | 24 | 62 | 89 | 37 | 12 | 20 | 5 | 103 | 128 |
Championship: March 17, 2018 † indicates conference regular season champion; * indicates conference tournament champion Rankings: USCHO.com Top 20 Poll; updated March 5, 2018

== Schedule ==
| Date | Time | Opponent^{#} | Rank^{#} | Site | Decision | Result | Attendance | Record |
Exhibition
| September 30 | 7:00 pm | Alberta* | #6 | AMSOIL Arena • Duluth, Minnesota (Exhibition) | Patt | L 3–4 | 5,704 | — |
Regular season
Ice Breaker Tournament
| October 6 | 7:30 pm | vs. #3 Minnesota* | #6 | AMSOIL Arena • Duluth, Minnesota (IceBreaker) | Shepard | W 4–3 ^{OT} | 7,203 | 1–0–0 (0–0–0) |
| October 7 | 7:30 pm | vs. Michigan Tech* | #6 | AMSOIL Arena • Duluth, Minnesota (IceBreaker) | Deery | L 3–4 | 5,880 | 1–1–0 (0–0–0) |
| October 13 | 7:00 pm | at Bemidji State* | #5 | Sanford Center • Bemidji, Minnesota | Shepard | L 2–5 | 3,661 | 1–2–0 (0–0–0) |
| October 14 | 7:00 pm | vs. Bemidji State* | #5 | AMSOIL Arena • Duluth, Minnesota | Deery | T 0–0 ^{OT} | 5,615 | 1–2–1 (0–0–0) |
| October 20 | 7:30 pm | vs. Merrimack* | #9 | AMSOIL Arena • Duluth, Minnesota | Deery | T 5–5 ^{OT} | 5,152 | 1–2–2 (0–0–0) |
| October 21 | 7:30 pm | vs. Merrimack* | #9 | AMSOIL Arena • Duluth, Minnesota | Shepard | W 7–2 | 5,642 | 2–2–2 (0–0–0) |
| October 27 | 8:27 pm† | at vs. Maine* | #10 | Alfond Arena • Orono, Maine | Shepard | W 2–1 | 3,483 | 3–2–2 (0–0–0) |
| October 28 | 7:30 pm | at vs. Maine* | #10 | Alfond Arena • Orono, Maine | Shepard | W 2–0 | 3,506 | 4–2–2 (0–0–0) |
| November 3 | 7:30 pm | at #2 St. Cloud State | #8 | Herb Brooks National Hockey Center • St. Cloud, Minnesota | Shepard | L 3–5 | 3,652 | 4–3–2 (0–1–0) |
| November 4 | 7:30 pm | at #2 St. Cloud State | #8 | Herb Brooks National Hockey Center • St. Cloud, Minnesota | Shepard | L 0–5 | 4,208 | 4–4–2 (0–2–0) |
| November 10 | 7:00 pm | vs. #18 Western Michigan | #12 | AMSOIL Arena • Duluth, Minnesota | Shepard | W 3–0 | 5,422 | 5–4–2 (1–2–0) |
| November 11 | 7:00 pm | vs. #18 Western Michigan | #12 | AMSOIL Arena • Duluth, Minnesota | Shepard | L 0–5 | 5,810 | 5–5–2 (1–3–0) |
| November 17 | 7:30 pm | at Miami | #14 | Goggin Ice Center • Oxford, Ohio | Shepard | W 3–1 | 2,348 | 6–5–2 (2–3–0) |
| November 18 | 7:00 pm | at Miami | #14 | Goggin Ice Center • Oxford, Ohio | Shepard | L 2–3 | 2,552 | 6–6–2 (2–4–0) |
| November 25 | 7:00 pm | vs. #8 Minnesota State* | #16 | AMSOIL Arena • Duluth, Minnesota | Shepard | W 3–1 | 5,536 | 7–6–2 (2–4–0) |
| December 1 | 7:00 pm | vs. #1 Denver | #16 | AMSOIL Arena • Duluth, Minnesota | Shepard | L 0–1 | 6,207 | 7–7–2 (2–5–0) |
| December 2 | 7:00 pm | vs. #1 Denver | #16 | AMSOIL Arena • Duluth, Minnesota | Shepard | L 1–2 | 5,838 | 7–8–2 (2–6–0) |
| December 8 | 7:00 pm | at Omaha | #17 | Baxter Arena • Omaha, Nebraska | Deery | L 5–7 | 6,067 | 7–9–2 (2–7–0) |
| December 9 | 7:00 pm | at Omaha | #17 | Baxter Arena • Omaha, Nebraska | Shepard | W 6–2 | 6,121 | 8–9–2 (3–7–0) |
Ledyard Bank Classic
| December 29 | 4:00 pm | vs. Yale* | #17 | Thompson Arena • Hanover, New Hampshire (Ledyard Bank) | Shepard | W 5–0 | 3,376 | 9–9–2 (3–7–0) |
| December 30 | 7:00 pm | vs. Dartmouth* | #17 | Thompson Arena • Hanover, New Hampshire (Ledyard Bank) | Shepard | T 2–2 ^{SO (2-1 UMD)} | – | 9–9–3 (3–7–0) |
| January 12 | 7:30 pm | at Colorado College | #15 | World Arena • Colorado Springs, Colorado | Shepard | W 6–5 | 4,473 | 10–9–3 (4–7–0) |
| January 13 | 6:00 pm | at Colorado College | #15 | World Arena • Colorado Springs, Colorado | Shepard | W 5–1 | 4,651 | 11–9–3 (5–7–0) |
| January 19 | 8:00 pm | vs. #7 North Dakota | #14 | AMSOIL Arena • Duluth, Minnesota | Shepard | W 5–3 | 6,372 | 12–9–3 (6–7–0) |
| January 20 | 7:00 pm | vs. #7 North Dakota | #14 | AMSOIL Arena • Duluth, Minnesota | Shepard | W 5–2 | 6,903 | 13–9–3 (7–7–0) |
| January 23 | 7:00 pm | at #7 Minnesota State* | #9 | Verizon Center • Mankato, Minnesota | Shepard | L 0–1 | 3,907 | 13–10–3 (7–7–0) |
| January 26 | 7:00 pm | vs. #5 St. Cloud State | #9 | AMSOIL Arena • Duluth, Minnesota | Shepard | W 5–1 | 6,210 | 14–10–3 (8–7–0) |
| January 27 | 7:00 pm | vs. #5 St. Cloud State | #9 | AMSOIL Arena • Duluth, Minnesota | Shepard | L 1–2 | 7,149 | 14–11–3 (8–8–0) |
| February 2 | 7:00 pm | at #4 Denver | #9 | Magness Arena • Denver, Colorado | Shepard | L 0–1 | 5,564 | 14–12–3 (8–9–0) |
| February 3 | 7:00 pm | at #4 Denver | #9 | Magness Arena • Denver, Colorado | Shepard | L 3–4 | 6,200 | 14–13–3 (8–10–0) |
| February 16 | 7:00 pm | vs. Miami | #11 | AMSOIL Arena • Duluth, Minnesota | Shepard | W 4–0 | 5,545 | 15–13–3 (9–10–0) |
| February 17 | 7:00 pm | vs. Miami | #11 | AMSOIL Arena • Duluth, Minnesota | Shepard | W 3–0 | 6,543 | 16–13–3 (10–10–0) |
| February 23 | 7:00 pm | at #17 Western Michigan | #9 | Lawson Arena • Kalamazoo, Michigan | Shepard | W 8–0 | 2,888 | 17–13–3 (11–10–0) |
| February 24 | 7:00 pm | at #17 Western Michigan | #9 | Lawson Arena • Kalamazoo, Michigan | Shepard | W 6–1 | 3,535 | 18–13–3 (12–10–0) |
| March 2 | 7:00 pm | vs. #14 Omaha | #7 | AMSOIL Arena • Duluth, Minnesota | Shepard | L 1–4 | 5,287 | 18–14–3 (12–11–0) |
| March 3 | 7:00 pm | vs. #14 Omaha | #7 | AMSOIL Arena • Duluth, Minnesota | Shepard | W 4–1 | 5,160 | 19–14–3 (13–11–0) |
NCHC Tournament
| March 9 | 7:00 pm | vs. Western Michigan* | #8 | AMSOIL Arena • Duluth, Minnesota (NCHC Quarterfinal) | Shepard | W 5–0 | 4,359 | 20–14–3 (13–11–0) |
| March 10 | 7:00 pm | vs. Western Michigan* | #8 | AMSOIL Arena • Duluth, Minnesota (NCHC Quarterfinal) | Shepard | W 2–0 | 4,391 | 21–14–3 (13–11–0) |
| March 16 | 7:30 pm | vs. #4 Denver* | #8 | Xcel Energy Center • Saint Paul, Minnesota (NCHC Semi-final) | Shepard | L 1–3 | 11,983 | 21–15–3 (13–11–0) |
| March 17 | 3:30 pm | vs. #12 North Dakota* | #8 | Xcel Energy Center • Saint Paul, Minnesota (NCHC Third place) | Shepard | L 1–4 | 11,372 | 21–16–3 (13–11–0) |
NCAA Division I Tournament
| March 23 | 6:30 pm | vs. #6 Minnesota State* | #11 | Denny Sanford Premier Center • Sioux Falls, South Dakota (West Regional Semi-final) | Shepard | W 3–2 ^{OT} | 7,992 | 22–16–3 (13–11–0) |
| March 24 | 8:00 pm | vs. Air Force* | #11 | Denny Sanford Premier Center • Sioux Falls, South Dakota (West Regional Final) | Shepard | W 2–1 | 8,015 | 23–16–3 (13–11–0) |
| April 5 | 5:00 pm | vs. #5 Ohio State* | #11 | Xcel Energy Center • Saint Paul, Minnesota (National Semi-final) | Shepard | W 2–1 | 18,026 | 24–16–3 (13–11–0) |
| April 7 | 6:30 pm | vs. #2 Notre Dame* | #11 | Xcel Energy Center • Saint Paul, Minnesota (National championship) | Shepard | W 2–1 | 18,303 | 25–16–3 (13–11–0) |
*Non-conference game. ^{#}Rankings from USCHO.com Poll. All times are in Central Time. Source:

† start delayed due to a power outage.

== Roster and scoring statistics ==
| No. | Name | Year | Position | Hometown | Country | Games | Goals | Assists | Pts | PIM |
|---|---|---|---|---|---|---|---|---|---|---|
| 7 | Scott Perunovich | Freshman | D | Hibbing, MN | (United States) | 42 | 11 | 25 | 39 | 36 |
| 25 | Peter Krieger | Junior | F | Oakdale, MN | (United States) | 44 | 11 | 19 | 30 | 44 |
| 27 | Riley Tufte | Sophomore | LW | Blaine, MN | (United States) | 42 | 16 | 13 | 29 | 36 |
| 13 | Joey Anderson | Sophomore | RW | Roseville, MN | (United States) | 36 | 11 | 16 | 27 | 20 |
| 22 | Jared Thomas | Senior | LW | Hermantown, MN | (United States) | 43 | 11 | 15 | 26 | 16 |
| 3 | Mikey Anderson | Freshman | D | Roseville, MN | (United States) | 39 | 5 | 18 | 23 | 18 |
| 23 | Nick Swaney | Freshman | RW | Lakeville, MN | (United States) | 35 | 6 | 16 | 22 | 6 |
| 20 | Karson Kuhlman | Senior | C | Duluth, MN | (United States) | 44 | 13 | 7 | 20 | 18 |
| 39 | Parker Mackey | Junior | RW | Irma, AB | (Canada) | 35 | 9 | 10 | 19 | 6 |
| 5 | Nick Wolff | Sophomore | D | Eagan, MN | (United States) | 44 | 7 | 6 | 13 | 81 |
| 26 | Jade Miller | Sophomore | F | Minto, ND | (United States) | 38 | 3 | 10 | 13 | 20 |
| 4 | Dylan Samberg | Freshman | D | Hermantown, MN | (United States) | 42 | 1 | 12 | 13 | 43 |
| 17 | Blake Young | Senior | LW | Battleford, SK | (Canada) | 44 | 7 | 5 | 12 | 28 |
| 11 | Avery Peterson | Senior | C | Grand Rapids, MN | (United States) | 30 | 6 | 5 | 11 | 29 |
| 16 | Billy Exell | Junior | RW | Thunder Bay, ON | (Canada) | 40 | 5 | 6 | 11 | 8 |
| 10 | Kobe Roth | Freshman | F | Warroad, MN | (United States) | 30 | 4 | 5 | 9 | 4 |
| 6 | Louie Roehl | Freshman | D | Eden Prairie, MN | (United States) | 38 | 3 | 6 | 9 | 16 |
| 19 | Justin Richards | Freshman | C | Columbus, OH | (United States) | 44 | 0 | 9 | 9 | 6 |
| 12 | Jarod Hilderman | Sophomore | D | Yorkton, SK | (Canada) | 15 | 1 | 5 | 6 | 6 |
| 21 | Matt Anderson | Freshman | D | Shakopee, MN | (United States) | 35 | 1 | 5 | 6 | 12 |
| 32 | Hunter Shepard | Sophomore | G | Grand Rapids, MI | (United States) | 41 | 0 | 2 | 2 | 0 |
| 28 | Sammy Spurrell | Senior | C | Sherwood Park, AB | (Canada) | 15 | 1 | 0 | 1 | 6 |
| 8 | Kobe Bender | Freshman | F | Cloquet, MN | (United States) | 9 | 0 | 1 | 1 | 0 |
| 37 | Nick Deery | Sophomore | G | La Crosse, WI | (United States) | 5 | 0 | 0 | 0 | 0 |
| 18 | Nick McCormack | Senior | D | Ramsey, MN | (United States) | 7 | 0 | 0 | 0 | 17 |
| Total | | | | | | | 132 | 216 | 351 | 476 |

== Goaltending statistics ==
| No. | Name | Games | Minutes | Wins | Losses | Ties | Goals against | Saves | Shut outs | SV % | GAA |
|---|---|---|---|---|---|---|---|---|---|---|---|
| 32 | Hunter Shepard | 41 | 2392 | 25 | 14 | 1 | 76 | 936 | 8 | .925 | 1.91 |
| 37 | Nick Deery | 5 | 242 | 0 | 2 | 2 | 12 | 87 | 1 | .879 | 2.97 |
| | open net | | 24 | | | | 4 | | | | |
| Total | | 44 | 2659 | 25 | 16 | 3 | 92 | 1023 | 9 | .917 | 2.08 |

== 2018 national championship ==
=== (E1) Notre Dame vs. (W3) Minnesota–Duluth ===
| April 7 | Notre Dame | 1 – 2 | Minnesota–Duluth | Xcel Energy Center | Recap |

Scoring summary
| Period | Team | Goal | Assist(s) | Time | Score |
|---|---|---|---|---|---|
| 1st | UMD | Karson Kuhlman (13) | Miller | 9:06 | 1–0 UMD |
| 1st | UMD | Jared Thomas (11) – GW | Kuhlman | 18:39 | 2–0 UMD |
| 2nd | ND | Andrew Oglevie (15) – PP | Morrison and Evans | 27:40 | 2–1 UMD |
| 3rd | None | | | | |
Penalty summary
| Period | Team | Player | Penalty | Time | PIM |
| 1st | ND | Mike O'Leary | Hooking | 19:42 | 2:00 |
| 2nd | ND | Jordan Gross | Tripping | 22:19 | 2:00 |
| 2nd | UMD | Louie Roehl | Interference | 24:35 | 2:00 |
| 2nd | UMD | Scott Perunovich | Interference | 27:08 | 2:00 |
| 2nd | ND | Colin Theisen | Kneeing | 30:02 | 2:00 |

Shots by period
| Team | 1 | 2 | 3 | T |
|---|---|---|---|---|
| Minnesota–Duluth | 10 | 18 | 7 | 35 |
| Notre Dame | 7 | 8 | 5 | 20 |

Goaltenders
| Team | Name | Saves | Goals against | Time on ice |
|---|---|---|---|---|
| UMD | Hunter Shepard | 19 | 1 | 59:26 |
| ND | Cale Morris | 33 | 2 | 58:32 |

== See also ==
- 2018 NCAA Division I Men's Ice Hockey Tournament
- List of NCAA Division I Men's Ice Hockey Tournament champions
