= Frozen Faceoff MVP =

NCHC Frozen Faceoff MVP
- Sport: Ice hockey
- Awarded for: The Most Valuable Player in the NCHC Frozen Faceoff tournament

History
- First award: 2014
- Most recent: Johnny Hicks

The Frozen Faceoff MVP is an annual award given out at the conclusion of the National Collegiate Hockey Conference tournament season to the best player in the championship as voted by the coaches of each NCHC team.

The Frozen Faceoff MVP was first awarded in 2014 and is a successor to the CCHA Most Valuable Player in Tournament which was discontinued after the conference dissolved due to the 2013–14 NCAA conference realignment.

== Award winners ==
| Year | Winner | Position | School |
|---|---|---|---|
| 2014 | Daniel Doremus | Forward | Denver |
| 2015 | Blake Coleman | Forward | Miami |
| 2016 | Mikey Eyssimont | Forward | St. Cloud State |
| 2017 | Alex Iafallo | Forward | Minnesota Duluth |
| 2018 | Tanner Jaillet | Goaltender | Denver |
| 2019 | Hunter Shepard | Goaltender | Minnesota Duluth |
| 2020 | Not awarded due to the coronavirus pandemic | | |
| 2021 | Riese Gaber | Right Wing | North Dakota |
| 2022 | Ryan Fanti | Goaltender | Minnesota Duluth |
| 2023 | Jami Krannila | Center | St. Cloud State |
| 2024 | McKade Webster | Forward | Denver |
| 2025 | Alex Bump | Left Wing | Western Michigan |
| 2026 | Johnny Hicks | Goaltender | Denver |

=== Winners by school ===
| School | Winners |
|---|---|
| Denver | 4 |
| Minnesota Duluth | 3 |
| St. Cloud State | 2 |
| Miami | 1 |
| North Dakota | 1 |
| Western Michigan | 1 |

=== Winners by position ===
| Position | Winners |
|---|---|
| Center | 1 |
| Left Wing | 1 |
| Right Wing | 1 |
| Forward | 5 |
| Defenceman | 0 |
| Goaltender | 4 |

== See also ==
- NCHC Awards
