= Tanner Jaillet =

Canadian ice hockey player (born 1993)

- Born: August 18, 1993 (age 32) Red Deer, Alberta, Canada
- Height: 5 ft 11 in (180 cm)
- Weight: 180 lb (82 kg; 12 st 12 lb)
- Position: Goaltender
- Caught: Left
- Played for: Jacksonville Icemen; Karlskrona HK
- NHL draft: Undrafted
- Playing career: 2018–2020

Tanner Jaillet (born August 18, 1993) is a Canadian former professional ice hockey goaltender. He most recently played with Karlskrona HK in the HockeyAllsvenskan (Allsv). He helped Denver win their eighth National Title in 2017 and received the Mike Richter Award as the National Goaltender of the Year the same season.

== Playing career ==
=== Junior ===
Jaillet was an unheralded goaltender playing in the Alberta Junior Hockey League, going undrafted in his first year of eligibility despite his team reaching the league championship. Jaillet remained with the Fort McMurray Oil Barons for two more seasons before joining the college ranks.

=== College ===
Jaillet joined the program in Denver for the 2014–15 season, going 15–8 while splitting time with sophomore Evan Cowley. By the end of the season, however, Jaillet was in net for both of Denver's games at the 2015 NCAA Tournament and was establishing himself as the #1 goaltender for the team. The two goalies continued to share the crease in 2015–16 with Jaillet taking the biggest share and by the start of 2016–17 Jaillet had firmly established himself as the starting goaltender. 2017 also coincided with Denver's first 30-win season in 12 years and the program's 8th National Title. Jaillet finished 3rd in the nation in goals against average despite not recording a single shut out all season. He was named as the national goaltender of the year, receiving the Mike Richter Award for his stellar play, but somehow was not named a First Team All-American, ending up on the West Second Team instead. Despite Denver losing several players, including the Hobey Baker Award-winning Will Butcher, Jaillet performed nearly as well in his senior season, allowing his g.a.a. to rise only by 0.04 points. While he wasn't able to get Denver back to the Frozen Four he was able to lead the team to the NCHC Tournament Championship, winning Tournament MVP in the process. In his penultimate college game, Jaillet won his 82nd contest, tying the program record he now holds with Ron Grahame.

=== Professional ===
After graduating Jaillet signed on with the Wolfsburg Grizzlies of the Deutsche Eishockey Liga before ending up with the Jacksonville IceMen for the duration of the 2018–19 season.

== Awards and honors ==
Award	Year
All-NCHC First Team	2016–17
AHCA West Second Team All-American	2016–17
NCAA All-Tournament Team	2017
All-NCHC First Team	2017–18
AHCA West Second Team All-American	2017–18

Awards and achievements
Preceded by Charlie Lindgren	NCHC Goaltender of the Year; 2016–17, 2017–18	Succeeded by Hunter Shepard
Preceded by Thatcher Demko	Mike Richter Award; 2016–17	Succeeded by Cale Morris
Preceded by Alex Iafallo	NCHC Tournament MVP; 2018	Succeeded by Hunter Shepard
