= Henrik Borgström =

Finnish ice hockey player (born 1997)

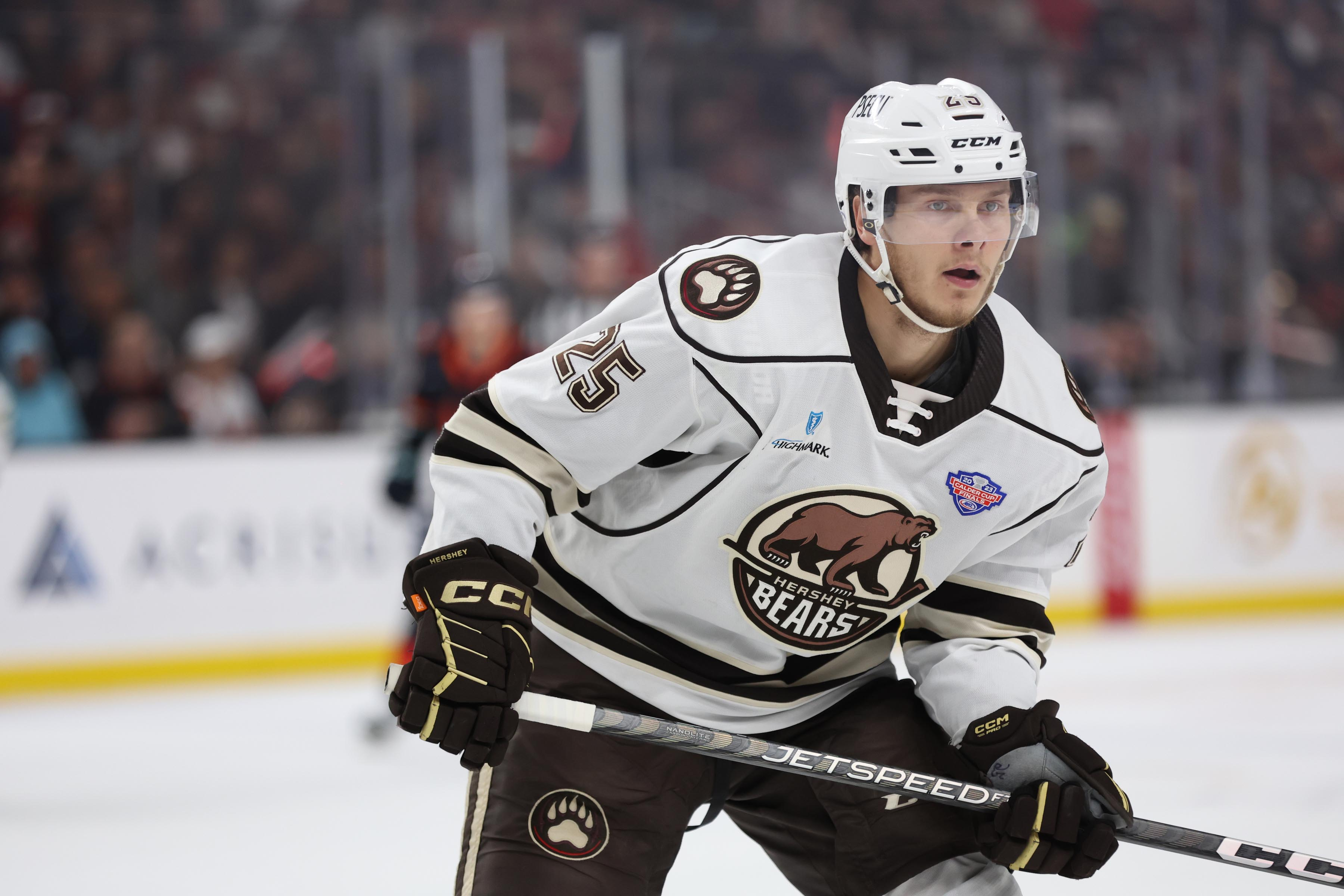
- Borgström with the Hershey Bears in 2023
- Born: 6 August 1997 (age 29) Helsinki, Finland
- Height: 6 ft 3 in (191 cm)
- Weight: 199 lb (90 kg; 14 st 3 lb)
- Position: Centre
- Shoots: Left
- NL team Former teams: HC Fribourg-Gottéron; Florida Panthers; HIFK; Chicago Blackhawks; Washington Capitals; HV71
- NHL draft: 23rd overall, 2016; Florida Panthers
- Playing career: 2018–present

Henrik Mikael Borgström (born 6 August 1997) is a Finnish professional ice hockey player who is currently playing with HC Fribourg-Gottéron in the National League (NL). He also played two seasons for the University of Denver in the National Collegiate Hockey Conference (NCHC). Borgström was an all-American at Denver and led the Pioneers to the 2017 NCAA Championship. Borgström was selected 23rd overall in the 2016 NHL entry draft by the Florida Panthers.

== Playing career ==
Prior to his career at Denver, Borgström played in his native Finland within the junior program of the HIFK organization. Borgström committed to playing for the Denver Pioneers prior to the NHL Entry Draft. Ranked as a potential 3rd-round pick, Borgström ended up being selected 23rd overall in the 2016 NHL entry draft by the Florida Panthers, his second eligible NHL draft. At the end of the 2017–18 season, he was named a Hobey Baker Award finalist, and a First-Team West All-American.

On 26 March 2018, Borgström signed an entry-level contract with the Panthers. He made his NHL debut in an overtime loss to the Ottawa Senators on 29 March. Borgström's first NHL goal was the first of four Panthers goals in their last game of the season, a 4–2 win over the Boston Bruins, on 8 April 2018.

Unable to come to terms with the Panthers as a restricted free agent and with the 2020–21 season, set to be delayed through the COVID-19 pandemic, Borgström opted to return to his original Finnish club, signing a one-year contract with HIFK of the Liiga, on 4 October 2020. Approaching the playoffs with HIFK, on 8 April 2021, Borgström's NHL rights were traded by the Panthers alongside Brett Connolly, Riley Stillman, and a 2021 7th-round draft pick to the Chicago Blackhawks in exchange for Lucas Carlsson and Lucas Wallmark.

On 12 May 2021, as a restricted free agent, Borgström agreed to a two-year, $2 million contract with the Chicago Blackhawks. In the 2021–22 season, Borgström appeared in a career high 52 regular season games with the Blackhawks, however was unable to find his offensive touch in contributing with just 4 goals and 7 points.

On 11 July 2022, Borgström was placed on unconditional waivers by the Blackhawks for the purpose of buying out the remaining year on his contract, he was released as a free agent the following day. On 14 July 2022, Borgström was signed to a one-year, two-way contract to join the Washington Capitals for the 2022–23 season. Borgström was assigned to AHL affiliate, the Hershey Bears for the majority of the season. He was recalled and featured in one game with the Capitals before returning to the Bears and helping the club claim the Calder Cup, assisting on the championship winning overtime goal.

As a pending restricted free agent, Borgström opted to return to Europe in securing a two-year contract with Swedish club, HV71 of the SHL, on June 26, 2023. Over two seasons in Jönköping, Borgström regained his scoring touch in totalling 79 points. Helping the club avoid relegation to the Allsvenskan in a play-out series, Borgström left HV71 at the conclusion of the 2024–25 season.

As a free agent, Borgström moved to the Swiss National League, securing a one-year contract with HC Fribourg-Gottéron on 1 May 2025.

== Career statistics ==
=== Regular season and playoffs ===
			Regular season					Playoffs
Season	Team	League	GP	G	A	Pts	PIM	GP	G	A	Pts	PIM
2015–16	HIFK	Jr. A	40	29	26	55	20	4	4	2	6	0
2016–17	University of Denver	NCHC	37	22	21	43	16	—	—	—	—	—
2017–18	University of Denver	NCHC	40	23	29	52	18	—	—	—	—	—
2017–18	Florida Panthers	NHL	4	1	0	1	0	—	—	—	—	—
2018–19	Springfield Thunderbirds	AHL	24	5	17	22	8	—	—	—	—	—
2018–19	Florida Panthers	NHL	50	8	10	18	4	—	—	—	—	—
2019–20	Florida Panthers	NHL	4	0	0	0	2	—	—	—	—	—
2019–20	Springfield Thunderbirds	AHL	49	11	12	23	10	—	—	—	—	—
2020–21	HIFK	Liiga	30	11	10	21	8	8	2	3	5	2
2021–22	Chicago Blackhawks	NHL	52	4	3	7	22	—	—	—	—	—
2022–23	Hershey Bears	AHL	55	8	13	21	10	14	2	4	6	6
2022–23	Washington Capitals	NHL	1	0	0	0	0	—	—	—	—	—
2023–24	HV71	SHL	50	16	18	34	33	—	—	—	—	—
2024–25	HV71	SHL	49	19	26	45	10	—	—	—	—	—
2025–26	HC Fribourg-Gottéron	NL	47	11	28	39	6	19	6	6	12	4
NHL totals			111	13	13	26	28	—	—	—	—	—
Liiga totals			30	11	10	21	8	8	2	3	5	2
SHL totals			99	35	44	79	43	—	—	—	—	—

=== International ===
Year	Team	Event	Result	GP	G	A	Pts	PIM
2017	Finland	WJC	9th	6	0	0	0	2
Junior totals				6	0	0	0	2

== Awards and honors ==
Award	Year
College
AHCA West First-Team All-American	2016–17, 2017–18
NCHC All-Tournament Team	2018
AHL
Calder Cup	2023

Awards and achievements
Preceded by Lawson Crouse	Florida Panthers first-round draft pick 2016	Succeeded by Owen Tippett
Preceded by Brock Boeser	NCHC Rookie of the Year; 2016–17	Succeeded by Scott Perunovich
Preceded by Will Butcher	NCHC Player of the Year; 2017–18	Succeeded by Jimmy Schuldt
Preceded by Anthony Louis	NCHC Forward of the Year; 2017–18	Succeeded by Patrick Newell
