= Hunter Shepard =

American ice hockey player (born 1995)

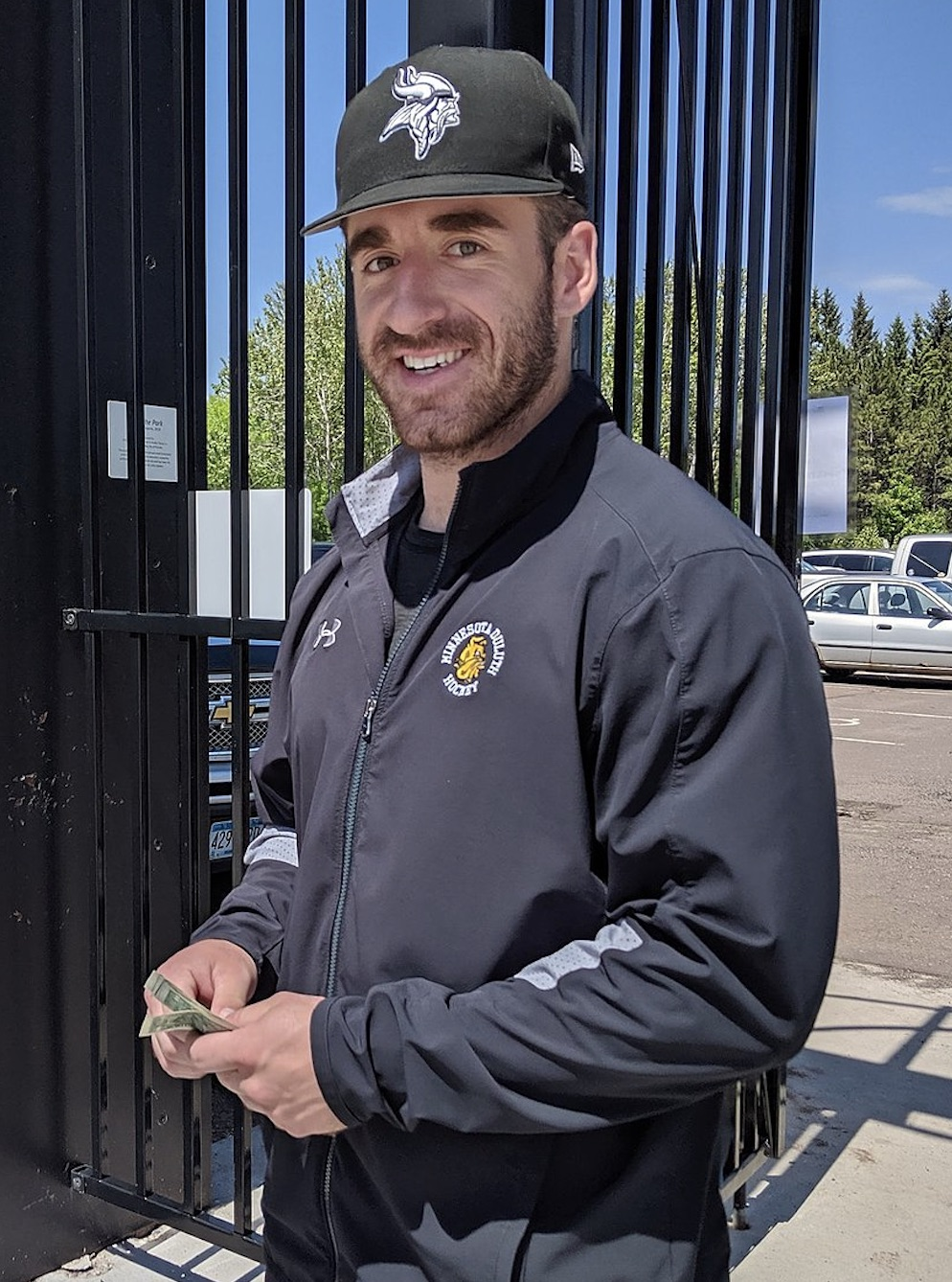
- Shepard in 2019
- Born: November 7, 1995 (age 30) Grand Rapids, Minnesota, U.S.
- Height: 6 ft 1 in (185 cm)
- Weight: 209 lb (95 kg; 14 st 13 lb)
- Position: Goaltender
- Catches: Left
- KHL team Former teams: Barys Astana; Washington Capitals; Ottawa Senators
- NHL draft: Undrafted
- Playing career: 2020–present

Hunter Markus Shepard (born November 7, 1995) is an American professional ice hockey player who is a goaltender for Barys Astana in the Kontinental Hockey League (KHL).

Growing up in Grand Rapids, Minnesota, Shepard attended Grand Rapids High School where he played prep school hockey and baseball. In his senior year, he received a Minnesota Minute Men Mr. Hockey Award and joined the Bismarck Bobcats of the North American Hockey League (NAHL). After two seasons with the Bobcats, during which he won their Goaltender of the Year award, he was approached by the Minnesota-Duluth Bulldogs (UMD) to be their third goaltender.

Shepard played four seasons of NCAA Division I with the Bulldogs, setting various records as the team's co-captain. He became the first goaltender captain since Rick Heinz in 1976 and received the 2018 Keith Christiansen Award as UMD's Most Valuable Player. Shepard started in over 105 consecutive games for the Bulldogs, setting a new NCAA record, and became the first netminder in a half century to lead his club to two consecutive NCAA titles. As a result of his achievements, he was selected as an AHCA All-American twice, received the NCHC Goaltender of the Year Award twice, was named NCHC Tournament MVP and a finalist for the Mike Richter Award as the top goaltender across collegiate hockey.

== Early life ==
Shepard was born in Grand Rapids, Minnesota, to parents Mark and Terri on November 7, 1995. Growing up, he was placed in a daycare run by the mother of Adam Hauser, the University of Minnesota Golden Gophers' starting goaltender. He would use a goaltending glove to catch softballs in the Hausers' living room and credits Hauser for encouraging him to become a goalie. Since no one in his family played hockey, his father and uncle coached him in baseball. He began playing competitive hockey at the age of five or six.

== Playing career ==
=== Youth ===
While attending Grand Rapids High School, Shepard played prep school hockey as a goaltender and baseball as an infielder and pitcher. In his final year at the school, Shepard and teammate Avery Peterson became the first pair from the same school to receive Minnesota Minute Men Mr. Hockey Award recognition in the same season. Upon graduating, he remained undrafted into the NHL and was not awarded any scholarships to play collegiate hockey. He had been drafted by the Lincoln Stars of the Tier 1 level United States Hockey League (USHL) but chose not to play with the team for he was not given a goaltending coach. Instead, he reached out to head coach Layne Sedevie of the Bismarck Bobcats in the North American Hockey League (NAHL) to see if there was a spot for him on their roster.

Shepard made his debut with the Bobcats during the 2014–15 season, where he let in seven goals on 25 shots including three on his first four shots. At the conclusion of his first year with the Bobcats, Shepard played in 31 games and yielded a 14-14-1 record, a 3.28 goals-against average (GAA) and a .878 save percentage. In his second season with the team, Shepard improved to a 34–11–3 record, setting a then franchise record in wins, along with a 1.90 GAA and .926 save percentage. As a result, he was selected to Team Central at the 2016 Top Prospects Tournament where he recorded a 1.99 GAA and named NAHL's January Goaltender of the Month. During the month of January, Shepard led the Bobcats to first place in the Central Division by winning all eight games he started while facing 241 shots over that same span. Following his second season with the Bobcats, being his last year of junior eligibility, Shepard was approached by the Minnesota-Duluth Bulldogs to be their third goaltender. His signing had been a last-minute move due to sophomore goaltender Kasimir Kaskisuo leaving to sign a professional contract. When asked in hindsight about what would have happened if Minnesota-Duluth had not approach him, Shepard said he would have likely attended a Division III school and played hockey and baseball.

=== Collegiate ===
Shepard played for the Minnesota-Duluth Bulldogs at the University of Minnesota Duluth (UMD) while majoring in marketing. He made his collegiate debut in a 3–1 loss to the Notre Dame Fighting Irish on October 15, 2016, where he stopped 35 shots. His save count was the most by a Bulldog goalie in his first collegiate appearance since October 26, 1991. His second appearance occurred on March 3, 2017, as a reliever to starter Hunter Miska in the second period against the Western Michigan Broncos. As the team qualified for the 2017 Frozen Four tournament, Shepard dressed for the Bulldogs' four tournament appearances.

Returning to the Bulldogs for his sophomore season, Shepard initially battled for the starting goaltender position with Ben Patt and Nick Deery following the departure of Miska. Head coach Scott Sandelin told each goaltender that they would each have a period to prove themselves during their season opener against the Minnesota Golden Gophers. Shepard played during the second period where he stopped all 10 shots he faced. Eventually earning himself the starter spot, the Bulldogs found themselves at the bottom of the NCHC standings with a record under .500. Despite this, head coach Scott Sandelin credited Shepard's support for the team's uprise over the second half of the 2017–18 season. As the Bulldogs slowly climbed the standings, Shepard set two new UMD records during a February game against Western Michigan for most shutouts by a goaltender in a single season (6) as well as consecutive shutouts (3). By April, Shepard held a .924 save percentage and 1.95 GAA as the team earned a 2018 Frozen Four tournament qualification against the Ohio State Buckeyes. The Bulldogs beat the Buckeyes 2–1 whereas Shepard was selected to the NCAA Frozen Four All-Tournament Team and named the Most Valuable Player. The Bulldogs then faced Notre Dame in the tournament final where he made 19 saves in an eventual 2–1 win for their second NCAA National Championship title in program history. He finished the season with a 25–14–1 record, boasting a 1.91 GAA and .925 save percentage, the latter being a new UMD single season record. As a result of his play, Shepard was named a semifinalist for the Mike Richter Award and received the Keith Christiansen Award as UMD's Most Valuable Player.

During the offseason prior to his junior year at Minnesota-Duluth, Shepard was invited to participate at the Minnesota Wild and Buffalo Sabres' development camps. He returned to the Bulldogs for the 2018–19 season unsigned to a professional contract and was named to the six-man Preseason All-NCHC Team. Shepard posted a 29–11–2 record over the course of his junior campaign, ranking first overall in wins and second in shutouts with seven. As a result, he concluded the season having started a program-record 81 consecutive games and earned a spot on the NCAA Frozen Four, the NCAA Midwest Regional and NCHC Frozen Faceoff All-Tournament Teams. He also earned his first NCHC Goaltender of the Year Award and NCHC Three Stars Award. As the Bulldogs entered the postseason, Shepard was named a AHCA First Team All-American, the first UMD goaltender since Alex Stalock, and a final five finalist for the Mike Richter Award. During the 2019 Frozen Four, Shepard posted his seventh shutout against the UMass Minutemen, likewise registering a nation-leading 29th win in the process. He then led the team to a second consecutive NCAA National Championship title and received his second Keith "Huffer" Christiansen Award as UMD MVP.

Upon capturing their second NCAA National Championship title, Shepard immediately told the team he would return for his senior year, explaining: "most people might have thought that (he would go pro), but it was an easy decision for me. I grew up in Minnesota, my family is here, I love my teammates, the coaching staff. And I made a commitment to come here to play for four years. That means something to me." Thereafter, he was named co-captain of the Bulldogs with Nick Wolff, thus becoming the Bulldogs' first goaltender captain since Rick Heinz in 1976. With his 61st career win against the Colorado College Tigers on November 27, 2019, Sheparde set a new UMD record for most wins by a goaltender surpassing alumnus Rick Kosti and Taras Lendzyk. On January 25, 2020, he started his 105th consecutive start for the Bulldogs, setting a new NCAA record for a goaltender. The following month, Shepard was named one of 20 goaltenders longlisted for that year's Mike Richter Award. Despite the season being abruptly cut short due to the COVID-19 pandemic, Shepard nonetheless was selected as an AHCA Second-Team All-American. He also received his second Goaltender of the Year Award and earned the University of Minnesota Duluth's Outstanding Male Senior Athlete Award. He left the Bulldogs as one of their most decorated goaltenders in program history.

=== Professional ===
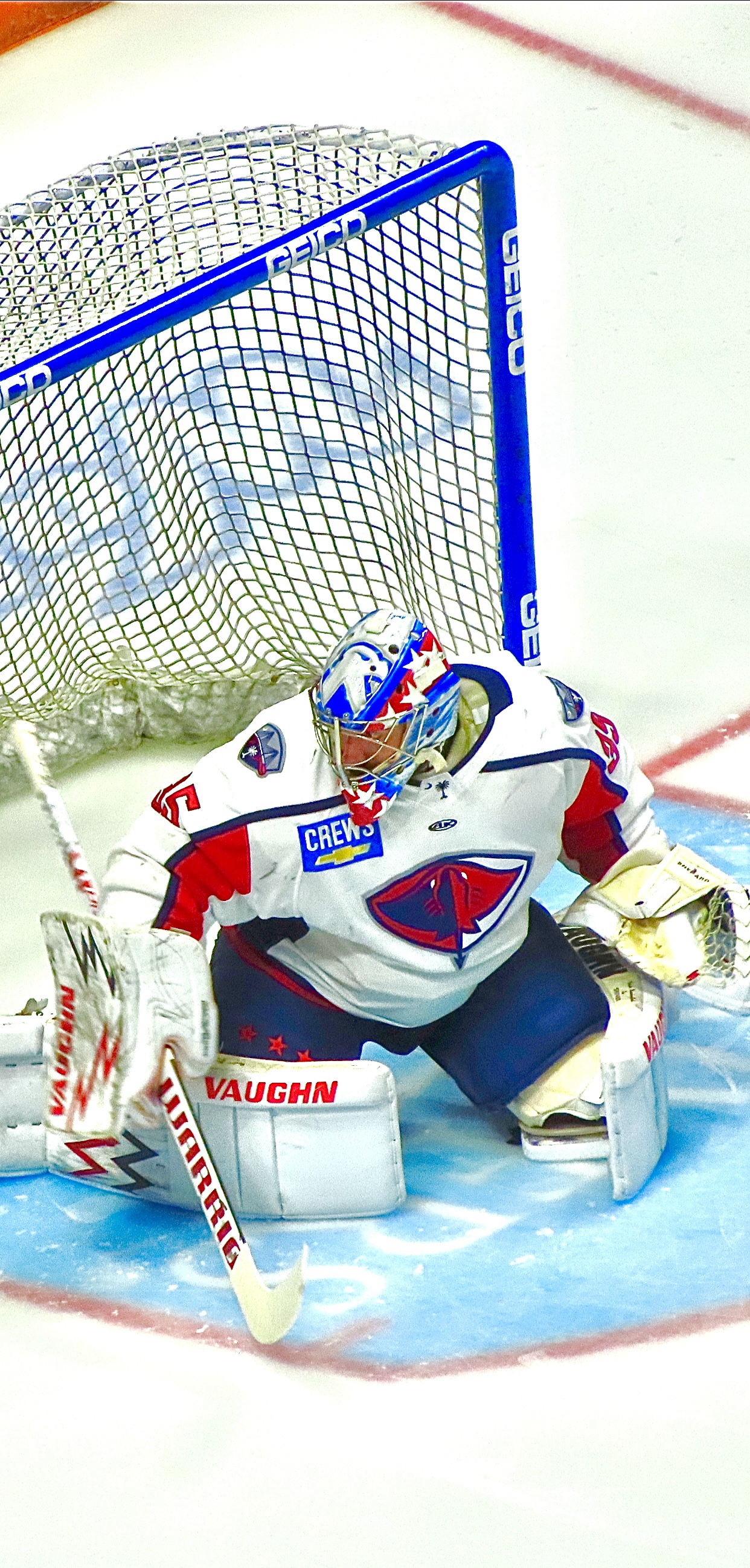
Shepard playing in the Kelly Cup Finals against the Fort Wayne Komets.

Shepard officially concluded his collegiate career on June 25, 2020, by signing a two-year American Hockey League (AHL) contract with the Hershey Bears. Due to the COVID-19 pandemic, the AHL season did not start until February 5, 2021. As such, Shepard was re-assigned to the South Carolina Stingrays of the ECHL in early December 2020. Shepard quickly mirrored his collegiate success during the ECHL's opening month, posting a 2–0–1 record with a 1.89 GAA and a save percentage of .935 over three appearances including his first professional win on December 18 against the Jacksonville Icemen. As a result of his success, Shepard was named ECHL Goaltender of the Month of December. He eventually made his AHL debut with the Hershey Bears on May 2, 2021, against the Lehigh Valley Phantoms stopping all 28 shots to secure a shutout victory for his team. Upon returning to the ECHL, Shepard received the league's Goaltender of the Week honors after going 3–0–0 with a shutout, a 1.33 GAA and a .952 save percentage. Entering the 2021 ECHL playoffs, Shepard helped lead the Stingrays to that year's Kelly Cup Finals against the Fort Wayne Komets who ultimately won the best-of-three series. On the back of a successful season, Shepard was signed to a two-year, two-way contract with the Bears main NHL affiliate, the Washington Capitals, on July 28, 2021.

Shepard began the 2021–22 season with the Bears but was scratched for the first two games of the season. He was subsequently re-assigned to the ECHL on October 20, 2021. Upon being re-assigned, Shepard matched his career-high 40 saves en route to a win over the Greenville Swamp Rabbits in his team's season opener. Following the win, Shepard was recalled to the Bears on October 28. He was returned to the ECHL on November 4 and he won his second game of the season before being recalled again on November 10. He made his season debut for the Bears on November 14 in a 5–2 loss to the Charlotte Checkers. Collectively, Shepard posted a 1–4–2 record with a 3.43 GAA and .903 save percentage for the Stingrays before being recalled to the AHL on December 21. He won two games over the Wilkes-Barre/Scranton Penguins to bring his save percentage from .808 to .901 and his GAA down to 2.34. Shepard played one more game against the Penguins on January 8 but spent the majority of the month on the Capitals' taxi squad. During the month of February, Shepard remained with the Bears as a backup for Zach Fucale while starting goaltender Pheonix Copley stayed up with the Washington Capitals. However, after surrendering three goals in a loss to the Hartford Wolf Pack on March 5, Shepard was re-assigned to the ECHL on March 7. In a seven-game stretch with the Stingrays, Shepard posted a 4–3–0 record including a shutout on March 16 against the Greenville Swamp Rabbits. He started in 13 of the Stingrays final 18 games and completed the season with a 12–9–2–0 record. After the Stingrays were eliminated from playoff contention, Shepard was recalled to the AHL level on April 21, 2022, to finish out the season with the Bears. On May 7, Shepard earned his first NHL recall hours before the Capitals began Game 3 of their first-round series against the Florida Panthers. He did not make his NHL debut before being replaced by Copley on May 13 as the Capitals' third goaltender.

In the final year of his contract, Shepard began the 2022–23 season with the Hershey Bears in the AHL after attending the Capitals training camp. Although Fucale began the season as the Bears' starting goaltender, Shepard earned significantly playing time as he posted a 4–0–2 record through the teams' first 16 games. Across his six games, he also maintained a 1.80 GAA and .935 save percentage. As he finished the month of November with six wins over six starts, Shepard received the AHL's Goaltender of the Month honor. Following this, Shepard received his first NHL call-up of the season on December 5. He spent seven games serving as backup for Charlie Lindgren while Darcy Kuemper recovered from a concussion but returned to the Bears on December 19 without having made his NHL debut. Shepard and Fucale served a strong goaltending tandem throughout the season as the Bears qualified for the 2023 Calder Cup playoffs. The duo became the first two Hershey goaltenders to both win 20 games in a season since 2018–19. Shepard finished the regular season with a 20–8 record, a 2.18 GAA, and .916 save percentage.

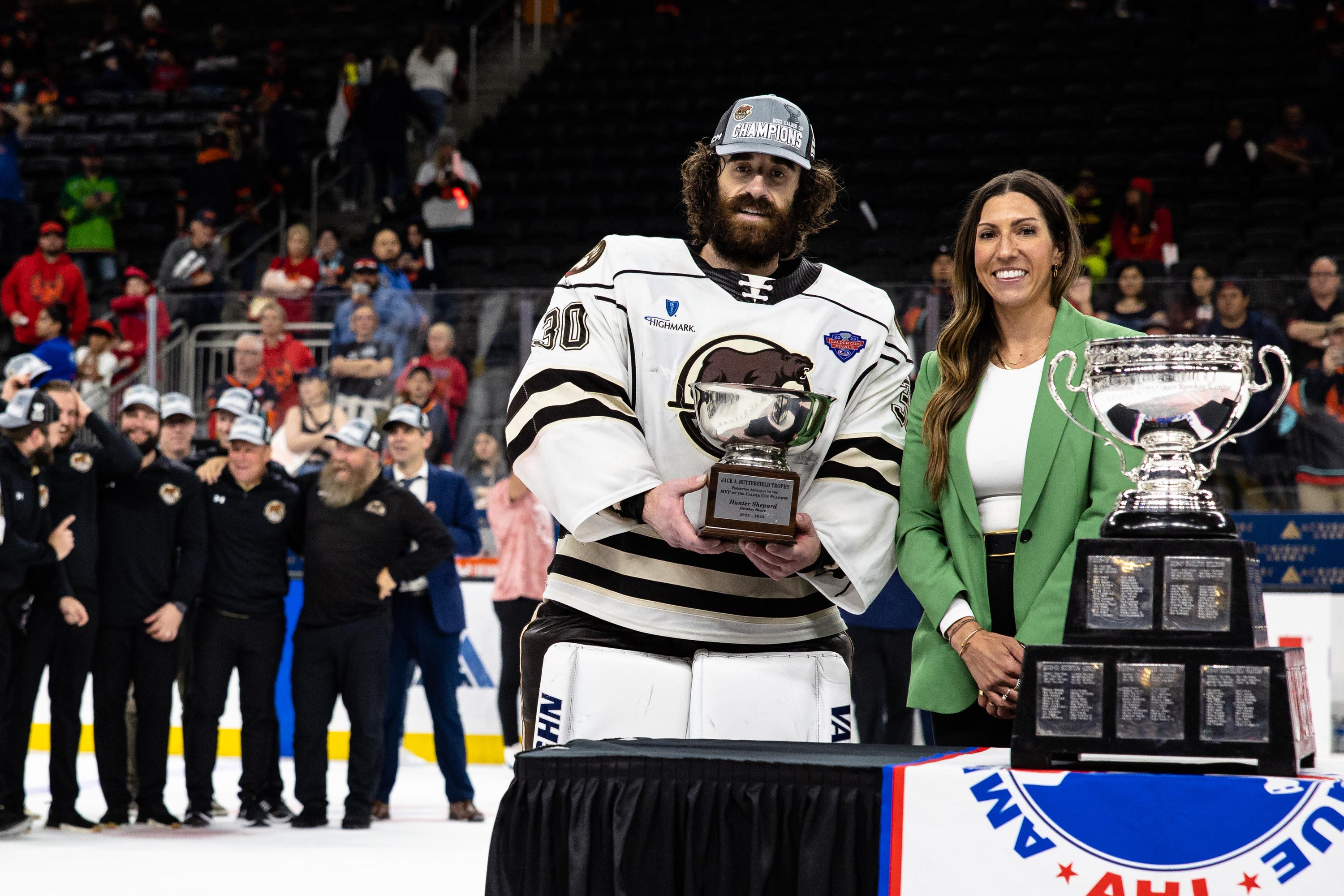
Shepard holding the Jack A. Butterfield Trophy.

Although Shepard split the goaltending duties with Fucale in the regular season, he played in all 20 games of the playoffs for a total of 1188 minutes. In their second-round series against the Charlotte Checkers, Shepard posted a 3–1–0 record as he made 85 saves and allowed only seven goals over four games. He remained the Bears' starter during their Eastern Conference Finals matchup with the Rochester Americans even after being pulled in Game 1 for allowing four goals on 16 shots. He returned to the Bears net for Game 2 and he recorded a shutout to even the series 1–1. Shepard recorded another shutout during their series to help the team capture the Richard F. Canning Trophy as the AHL's Eastern Conference champions. Upon finishing the series, Shepard's playoff record improved to 10–3 with a 1.85 GAA and .929 save percentage. Shepard and the Bears faced off against the Coachella Valley Firebirds in the Calder Cup Finals en route to their Calder Cup win. He recorded a shutout in Game 5 to give the Bears a 3–2 series lead. He later received the Jack A. Butterfield Trophy as the Most Valuable Player of the postseason after Hershey clinched the championship with a Game 7 overtime win. Following his Calder Cup win, the Capitals re-signed Shepard to another two-year, two-way contract worth $775,000.

After participating in training camp and preseason action with the Capitals, Shepard was reassigned to the Hershey Bears to begin the 2023–24 season. He played two games with the Bears, winning both, before being recalled to the NHL on October 24. The following day, Shepard made his NHL debut against the New Jersey Devils in a 6–4 Capitals victory. Upon returning to Hershey, he and the team would go on to capture another Calder Cup on June 24, 2024.

Having spent five years within the Capitals organization, Shepard left as an unrestricted free agent and opted to a one-year, two-way contract with the Ottawa Senators for the 2025–26 season on July 2, 2025. Initially assigned to the Senators' AHL affiliate, the Belleville Senators, Shepard was recalled to Ottawa after starter Linus Ullmark took a personal leave of absence from the team on December 29, 2025. After serving as backup for several games, Shepard made his team debut on January 5, 2026, against the Detroit Red Wings before being sent back to Belleville the following day. Two months later, he (along with teammate Jake Chiasson) was traded to the Montreal Canadiens and joined their AHL affiliate Laval Rocket for the remainder of the 2025–26 AHL season.

As a free agent at the conclusion of his contract with the Canadiens, Shepard opted to pursue an opportunity abroad by agreeing to a one-year contract with Kazakhstani based club, Barys Astana of the KHL, on July 23, 2026.

== Career statistics ==
			Regular season									Playoffs
Season	Team	League	GP	W	L	OT	MIN	GA	SO	GAA	SV%	GP	W	L	MIN	GA	SO	GAA	SV%
2011–12	Grand Rapids High	USHS	10	8	2	0	—	—	1	2.20	.908	—	—	—	—	—	—	—	—
2012–13	Grand Rapids High	USHS	24	17	14	3	—	—	5	1.95	.926	3	2	1	—	—	0	2.20	.911
2013–14	Grand Rapids High	USHS	25	17	8	0	—	—	1	2.64	.918	2	1	1	—	—	0	2.71	.914
2014–15	Bismarck Bobcats	NAHL	31	14	14	1	1739	95	1	3.28	.878	2	0	2	118	5	0	2.55	.911
2015–16	Bismarck Bobcats	NAHL	50	34	11	3	2932	93	8	1.90	.926	11	6	5	633	24	1	2.28	.926
2016–17	U. of Minnesota-Duluth	NCHC	2	0	2	0	93	4	0	2.58	.922	—	—	—	—	—	—	—	—
2017–18	U. of Minnesota-Duluth	NCHC	41	25	14	1	2393	76	8	1.91	.925	—	—	—	—	—	—	—	—
2018–19	U. of Minnesota-Duluth	NCHC	42	29	11	2	2556	75	7	1.76	.923	—	—	—	—	—	—	—	—
2019–20	U. of Minnesota-Duluth	NCHC	34	22	10	2	2033	74	2	2.18	.918	—	—	—	—	—	—	—	—
2020–21	South Carolina Stingrays	ECHL	21	12	6	2	1,222	52	1	2.55	.922	13	7	6	746	42	0	3.38	.883
2020–21	Hershey Bears	AHL	3	3	0	0	180	3	1	1.00	.969	—	—	—	—	—	—	—	—
2021–22	South Carolina Stingrays	ECHL	23	12	9	2	1,397	67	2	2.88	.917	—	—	—	—	—	—	—	—
2021–22	Hershey Bears	AHL	9	5	3	0	494	17	1	2.06	.922	—	—	—	—	—	—	—	—
2022–23	Hershey Bears	AHL	33	20	8	5	1,930	70	1	2.18	.916	20	14	6	1,188	45	3	2.27	.914
2023–24	Hershey Bears	AHL	34	27	4	3	2,076	61	5	1.76	.929	20	14	6	1,205	50	0	2.49	.910
2023–24	Washington Capitals	NHL	4	2	1	1	245	13	0	3.19	.894	—	—	—	—	—	—	—	—
2024–25	Hershey Bears	AHL	39	23	11	4	2,253	105	3	2.80	.891	7	2	5	412	19	1	2.77	.893
2024–25	Washington Capitals	NHL	1	0	1	0	60	7	0	7.00	.731	—	—	—	—	—	—	—	—
2025–26	Belleville Senators	AHL	15	6	7	2	887	54	0	3.65	.885	—	—	—	—	—	—	—	—
2025–26	Ottawa Senators	NHL	1	0	1	0	35	2	0	3.35	.833	—	—	—	—	—	—	—	—
2025–26	Laval Rocket	AHL	4	1	2	0	200	8	0	2.40	.899	1	0	0	40	2	0	3.00	.833
NHL totals			6	2	3	1	340	22	0	3.88	.863	—	—	—	—	—	—	—	—

== Awards and honors ==
Award	Year
NAHL
Goaltender of the Year	2016
First All-Star Team	2016
All-Central Division Team	2016
College
NCAA Championship	2018, 2019
NCAA All-Tournament Team	2018, 2019
All-NCHC Second Team	2018
NCHC Goaltender of the Year	2019, 2020
All-NCHC First Team	2019, 2020
AHCA West First Team All-American	2019
AHCA West Second Team All-American	2020
AHL
Jack A. Butterfield Trophy	2023
Calder Cup	2023, 2024
First All-Star Team	2024
Aldege "Baz" Bastien Memorial Award	2024
Harry "Hap" Holmes Memorial Award	2024

== Records ==
Bismarck Bobcats:

- Most shutouts, single season: 8 (2015–16)
- Most shutouts, career: 9

Minnesota-Duluth Bulldogs:

- Single season SV%: .925 (2017–18)
- Most shutouts, single season: 8 (2017–18)
- Single season GAA: 1.76 (2018–19)
- Most shutouts, career: 17
- Most wins, career: 76

National Collegiate Athletic Association:

- Most consecutive starts, career: 115

Awards and achievements
Preceded by Tanner Jaillet	NCHC Goaltender of the Year; 2018–19, 2019–20	Succeeded by Adam Scheel
Preceded by Tanner Jaillet	NCHC Tournament MVP; 2019	Succeeded by Riese Gaber
Preceded by Nick Halloran	NCHC Three Stars Award; 2018–19	Succeeded by Jordan Kawaguchi / Scott Perunovich
