= Patrick Newell (ice hockey) =

American ice hockey player (born 1996)

- Born: January 18, 1996 (age 30) Thousand Oaks, California, U.S.
- Height: 5 ft 10 in (178 cm)
- Weight: 170 lb (77 kg; 12 st 2 lb)
- Position: Winger
- Shoots: Left
- ECHL team Former teams: Greensboro Gargoyles; Hartford Wolf Pack; Stjernen Hockey; Södertälje SK; Fehérvár AV19; HK Nitra; Tahoe Knight Monsters; Orlando Solar Bears
- NHL draft: Undrafted
- Playing career: 2019–present

Patrick Newell (born January 18, 1996) is an American professional ice hockey player for the Greensboro Gargoyles of the ECHL. He played collegiate ice hockey for St. Cloud State University where he earned All-USCHO First Team, NCHC Forward of the Year, and CM/AHCA All-America honors.

== Early life ==
Newell was born and raised in Thousand Oaks, California. He first began playing organized hockey with the West Valley Wolves when he was eight years old. His father John played hockey growing up, which inspired Newell to take up the sport himself. He originally tried out rollerblading at the Rollerdome before committing to hockey.

== Playing career ==
=== Early career ===
While playing with the L.A. Junior Kings, a AAA hockey team, Newell committed to play Division 1 hockey for St. Cloud State. As a student at Oak Park High School, Newell asked his parents permission to move to Alaska to play competitive major junior ice hockey. There, he joined the Fairbanks Ice Dogs of the North American Hockey League and was later traded to the Indiana Ice of the United States Hockey League. With the Ice, he recorded four goals and seven points in 12 playoffs games to help the team win the USHL Clark Cup championship. However, the Ice disbanded after the 2013-14 season and he joined the Penticton Vees of the British Columbia Hockey League. During his first season with the Vees, Newell helped the team win the BCHL playoffs and reach the RBC Cup semifinals, where he was awarded the Tubby Schmaltz Trophy.

=== Collegiate ===
Newell competed with the St. Cloud State Huskies men's ice hockey team for four years. He recorded his first collegiate goals in a game against the Miami Redhawks on October 30, 2015. At the conclusion of the season, he recorded seven goals and 15 assists for a total of 22 points. He was also one of six St. Cloud State University rookies named to the NCHC Academic All-Conference Team and was later added to the NCHC Scholar-Athlete Team. In his sophomore season, he led the Huskies with 20 assists and was a recipient of the a 2017 All-NCHC Academic Award.

Newell broke out in his senior year at St. Cloud State. He was named the NCHC Player of the Week for the first time on October 15, after recording five points in a two games against Alaska Nanooks. By November 14, 2018, he had tied his career high seven goals and tied the team lead with 12 points. By the conclusion of the regular season, the St. Cloud Huskies ranked first in their division with Newell recording 18 goals for a total of 38 points through 32 games. On March 14, 2019, he was named NCHC Forward of the Year for leading the conference in both goals and points. Later, Newell was named to the 2018-19 All-USCHO First Team, selected as a Hobey Baker Award Top 10 Finalist alongside teammate Jimmy Schuldt, and chosen for the CM/AHCA All-America First Team.

=== Professional ===
On March 31, 2019, Newell's collegiate career ended when he signed a three-year entry-level contract with the New York Rangers. A few days later, he signed an Amateur Tryout agreement with the Rangers American Hockey League (AHL) affiliate, the Hartford Wolf Pack. He made his professional debut on April 4 in a 5-2 loss to the Springfield Thunderbirds.

Following the completion of his entry-level contract with the Rangers, Newell having played primarily with affiliate, the Hartford Wolf Pack, was released as a free agent. On August 20, 2021, Newell embarked on a career abroad by agreeing to a one-year contract with Norwegian club, Stjernen Hockey of the Eliteserien. Newell continued to play in Europe, playing for Swedish, Hungarian, and Slovak clubs before returned to North America to play in the ECHL.

== Career statistics ==
			Regular season					Playoffs
Season	Team	League	GP	G	A	Pts	PIM	GP	G	A	Pts	PIM
2011–12	Los Angeles Jr. Kings	T1EHL	34	13	19	32	20	—	—	—	—	—
2012–13	Fairbanks Ice Dogs	NAHL	42	10	12	22	6	—	—	—	—	—
2012–13	Indiana Ice	USHL	20	3	12	15	0	—	—	—	—	—
2013–14	Indiana Ice	USHL	59	13	30	43	8	12	4	3	7	0
2014–15	Penticton Vees	BCHL	56	16	31	47	8	22	3	11	14	4
2015–16	St. Cloud State University	NCHC	37	7	15	22	2	—	—	—	—	—
2016–17	St. Cloud State University	NCHC	36	4	20	24	6	—	—	—	—	—
2017–18	St. Cloud State University	NCHC	33	6	21	27	0	—	—	—	—	—
2018–19	St. Cloud State University	NCHC	39	21	26	47	8	—	—	—	—	—
2018–19	Hartford Wolf Pack	AHL	6	0	1	1	4	—	—	—	—	—
2019–20	Hartford Wolf Pack	AHL	57	6	7	13	8	—	—	—	—	—
2020–21	Hartford Wolf Pack	AHL	24	5	8	13	6	—	—	—	—	—
2021–22	Stjernen Hockey	NOR	42	21	30	51	12	12	1	7	8	0
2022–23	Södertälje SK	Allsv	30	3	12	15	2	6	2	0	2	2
2022–23	Fehérvár AV19	ICEHL	17	4	5	9	2	—	—	—	—	—
2022–23	HK Nitra	Slovak Extraliga	16	3	7	10	2	21	5	4	9	2
2023–24	Orlando Solar Bears	ECHL	18	4	10	14	0	—	—	—	—	—
2024–25	Tahoe Knight Monsters	ECHL	67	10	28	38	8	8	3	2	5	0
AHL totals			87	11	16	27	18	—	—	—	—	—

== Awards and honors ==
Award	Year	Ref
College
All-USCHO First Team	2019	
NCHC Forward of the Year	2019	
AHCA First-Team All-American	2019	

Awards and achievements
Preceded by Henrik Borgström	NCHC Forward of the Year; 2018–19	Succeeded by Jordan Kawaguchi
Preceded by Karson Kuhlman	NCHC Sportsmanship Award; 2018–19	Succeeded by Kobe Roth
