= Will Borgen =

American ice hockey player (born 1996)

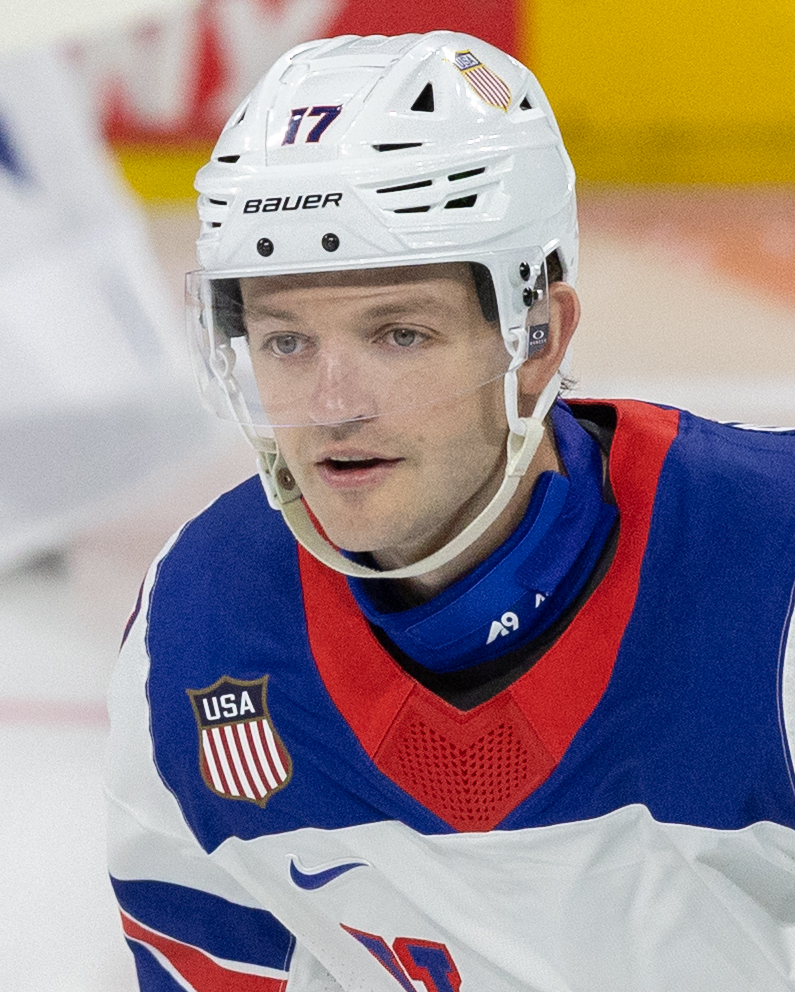
- Borgen in 2026.
- Born: December 19, 1996 (age 29) Moorhead, Minnesota, U.S.
- Height: 6 ft 3 in (191 cm)
- Weight: 204 lb (93 kg; 14 st 8 lb)
- Position: Defense
- Shoots: Right
- NHL team Former teams: Boston Bruins; Buffalo Sabres; Seattle Kraken; New York Rangers
- National team: United States
- NHL draft: 92nd overall, 2015; Buffalo Sabres
- Playing career: 2018–present

William Borgen (born December 19, 1996) is an American professional ice hockey player who is a defenseman for the Boston Bruins of the National Hockey League (NHL). He was drafted by the Buffalo Sabres in the fourth round, 92nd overall, of the 2015 NHL entry draft.

Growing up in Moorhead, Minnesota, Borgen began his hockey career with Moorhead High School. Following his third year with the team, Borgen joined the Omaha Lancers of the United States Hockey League. Borgen then opted to join St. Cloud State University of the National Collegiate Hockey Conference, where he played for the better part of three years. While Borgen was drafted by the Buffalo Sabres in 2015, he only joined the organization in 2017, after his third year with St. Cloud, playing with the Rochester Americans of the American Hockey League. He made his NHL debut with Buffalo in 2019, the team for which he would play for until 2021, when he was selected by the Seattle Kraken in the 2021 NHL expansion draft. Midway through his fourth year with Seattle, Borgen was traded to the New York Rangers for Kaapo Kakko, along with draft picks.

Internationally, Borgen has represented the United States at the 2016 World Junior Championships. He was named to the roster for the 2018 Winter Olympics, but he did not see any ice time.

== Playing career ==
=== Junior ===
For the first three years of his hockey career, Borgen played with Moorhead High School in Minnesota, competing in the Minnesota State High School League (MSHSL). In 2013, he and Moorhead went to the MHSHL Tournament. On March 22, 2014, during the 2013–14 season, a skate blade clipped Borgen's neck, cutting through some neck muscle, but stopping just short of his carotid artery. Borgen ended his first two seasons with Moorhead totaling 12 goals, 32 assists, and 61 penalty minutes through 57 regular season and playoff games.

During the 2014–15 season, with Moorhead through the regular season and playoffs, he collected 28 points and 70 penalty minutes through 27 games. Borgen then joined the Omaha Lancers of the United States Hockey League (USHL) to complete the 2014–15 season. He played 21 games with the Lancers, notching one goal and seven assists for eight points. He was ranked 114th overall in the NHL Bureau of Central Scouting's North American skater rankings. Borgen was drafted by the Buffalo Sabres in the 2015 NHL entry draft, in the fourth round, 92nd overall.

=== Collegiate ===
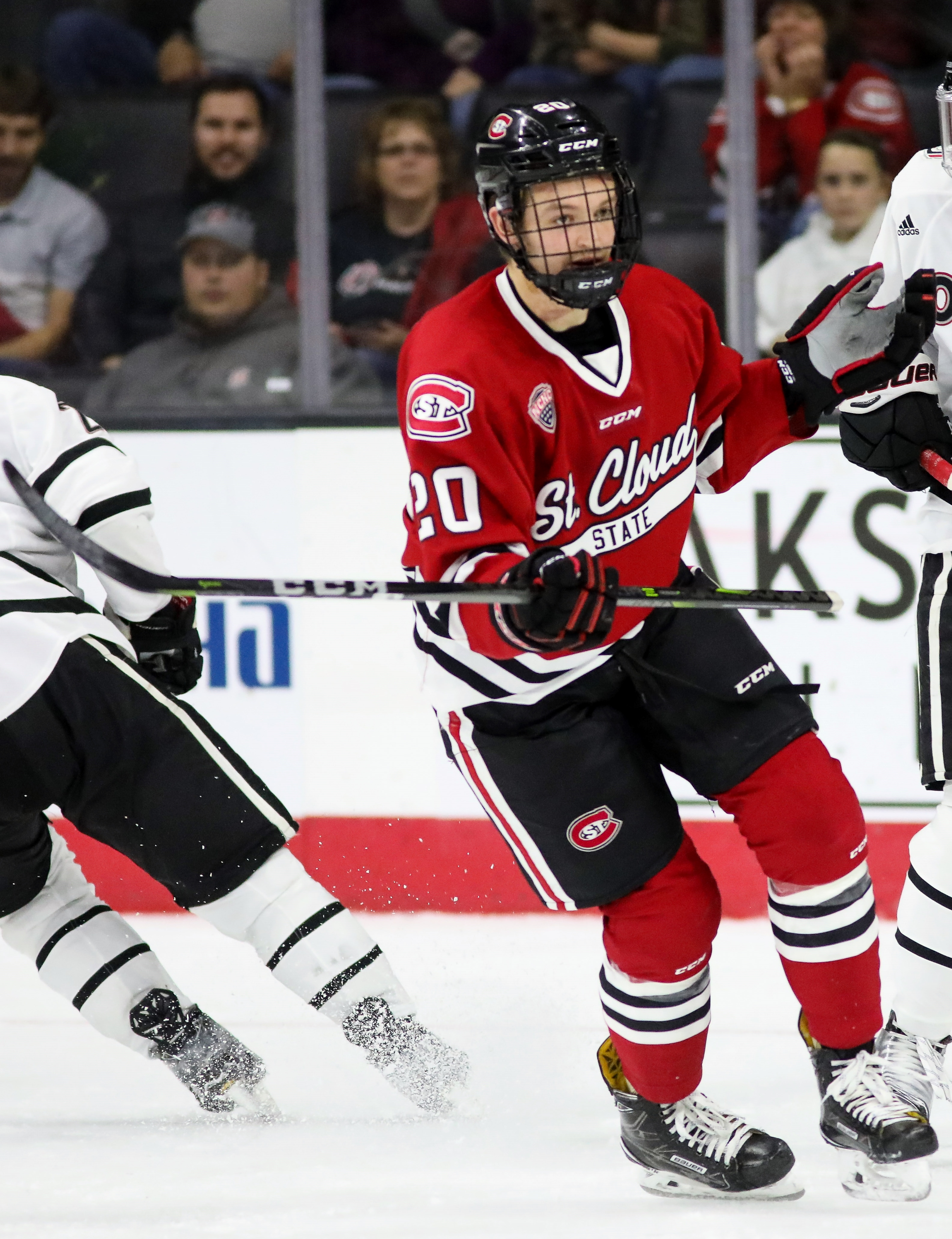
Borgen with the St. Cloud State Huskies in 2017

Following his time with the Lancers, Borgen began his collegiate career with the St. Cloud State Huskies of the National Collegiate Hockey Conference (NCHC). During the 2015–16 season, his freshman season at St. Cloud State, Borgen recorded his first collegiate point, an assist, in a game against Miami University on October 30. He later recorded his first collegiate goal against Western Michigan University. In the end, he recorded 11 assists through 22 games, leading all NCHC freshman defensemen. As a result, he was selected to the NCHC All-Rookie team.

In a game during the 2016–17 season, Borgen, while arguing a call, shoved a referee, causing him to gain a two-game suspension. That season, he notched two goals and 10 assists with 60 penalty minutes through 33 games. Partway through the 2017–18 season, Borgen had recorded two goals and 12 assists for a career-high and team-leading 14 points to become the NCHC Defensive Defenseman of the Year, as well as an All-NCHC Team Honorable Mention. He ended the season with one more assist, for 13 total.

=== Professional ===
After his junior season with the Huskies, Borgen was signed to a three-year, entry-level contract by the Buffalo Sabres on March 25, 2018. Until the beginning of his contract the next season, Borgen was assigned to the Sabres' American Hockey League (AHL) affiliate, the Rochester Americans, and he signed an amateur tryout agreement with the team. During the 2017–18 season, Borgen only played eight games with Rochester. During the 2018–19 season, in Rochester, Borgen tallied three goals and 11 assists for 14 points through 71 games. Near the end of the season, on March 26, 2019, Borgen made his NHL debut against the Ottawa Senators. Borgen's call-up to the NHL that season would let him play four games. During the 2019–20 season, Borgen notched only one goal and 10 assists for 11 points in 61 games. During the 2020–21 season, Borgen played 10 games with Buffalo, totaling 30 hits and 14 blocked shots.

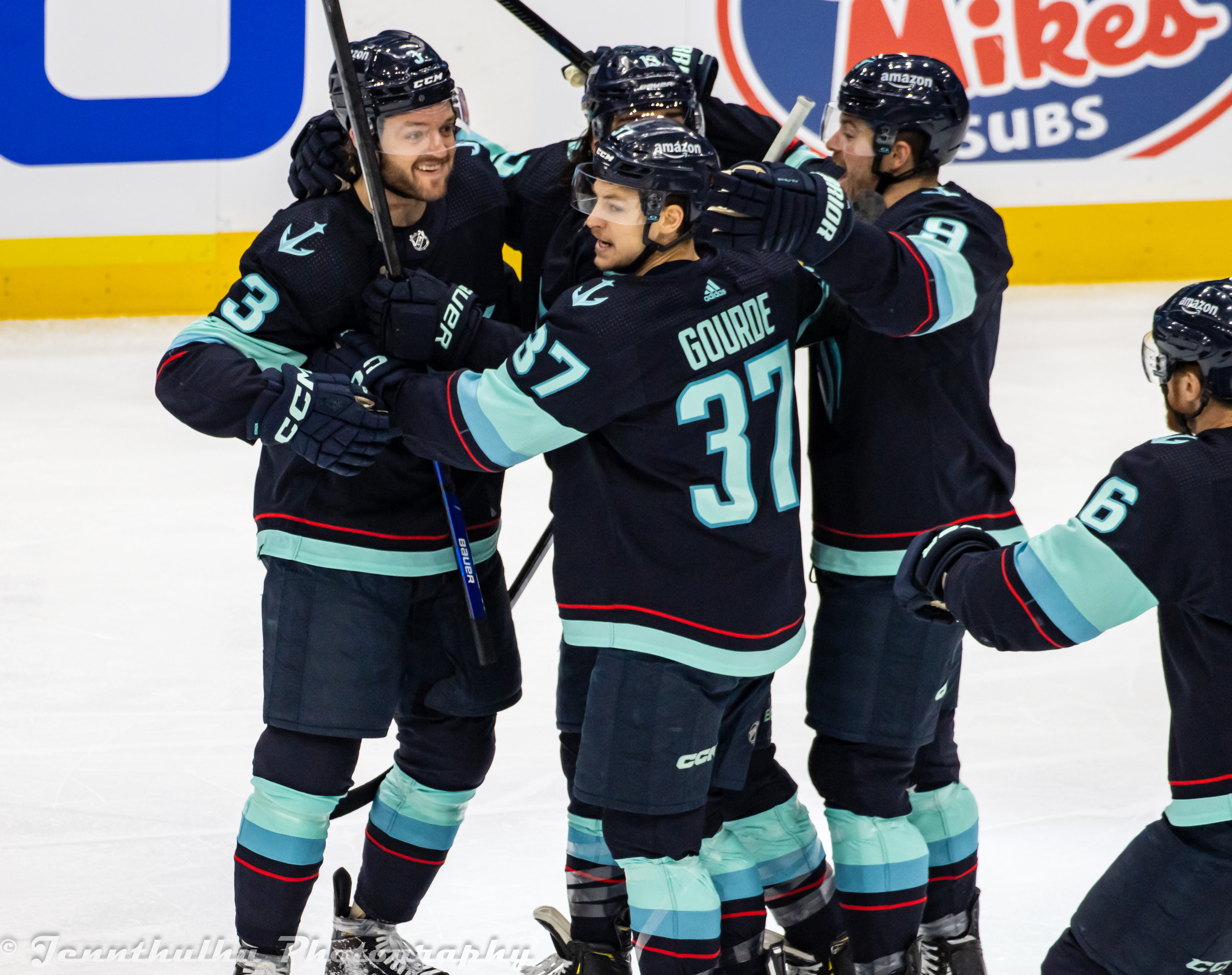
Borgen and teammates celebrating his first career playoff goal in 2023

On July 21, 2021, Borgen was selected from the Sabres by the Seattle Kraken in the 2021 NHL expansion draft. The Kraken then signed Borgen to a two-year, US$1,800,000 contract on August 5. Borgen scored his first NHL goal on January 2, 2022, against the Vancouver Canucks. He ended the 2021–22 season with two goals and six assists through 36 contests.

On February 7, 2023, Borgen played in his 100th career game, a 4–0 loss to the New York Islanders. During the 2022–23 season, Borgen achieved three goals and 17 assists through all 82 games, which at the time were his career highs. On April 24, He scored his first NHL playoff goal, the first goal of a 3–2 overtime victory over the Colorado Avalanche. Borgen ended up playing all 14 playoff games with the Kraken. Following the season, on July 7, Borgen signed a two-year, US$5,400,000 contract with the Kraken. On January 1, 2024, during the outdoor 2024 NHL Winter Classic against the Vegas Golden Knights, Borgen scored the second goal of the game—also his first of the season—as part of a 3–0 victory. During the 2023–24 season, Borgen set even greater career highs, collecting 22 assists, which, combined with three goals, totaled to 25 points.

During the 2024–25 season, on December 18, 2024, Borgen was traded by the Kraken to the New York Rangers along with third-round and sixth-round draft picks in 2025 in exchange for Kaapo Kakko. In 33 games with Seattle before the trade, Borgen had had one goal and one assist. On January 25, 2025, he was signed by New York to a five-year, US$20,500,000 contract. With New York that season, Borgen recorded four goals and nine assists for 13 points through 51 games. He also totaled 73 hits and 80 blocked shots.

After completing his first full season with the Rangers in 2025–26, Borgen was traded to the Boston Bruins in exchange for a 2027 second-round pick and 2028 conditional third-round pick on July 1, 2026.

== International play ==
Medal record

Representing United States

Ice hockey

World Junior Championships
Bronze medal – third place	2016 Helsinki	

Borgen was selected to represent the United States junior team at the 2016 World Junior Championships. He contributed to the team with three assists in seven games, as the United States captured the bronze medal.

On January 1, 2018, Borgen was selected to the United States' roster for the 2018 Winter Olympics, one of four collegiate players to receive the honor. However, Borgen did not play any games during his time with the team.

== Career statistics ==
=== Regular season and playoffs ===
			Regular season					Playoffs
Season	Team	League	GP	G	A	Pts	PIM	GP	G	A	Pts	PIM
2012–13	Moorhead High	MSHSL	24	3	16	19	22	3	0	1	1	0
2013–14	Moorhead High	MSHSL	24	6	10	16	35	3	2	3	5	2
2014–15	Moorhead High	MSHSL	24	5	21	26	64	3	1	1	2	6
2014–15	Omaha Lancers	USHL	18	1	5	6	0	3	0	0	0	0
2015–16	St. Cloud State	NCHC	37	1	13	14	36	—	—	—	—	—
2016–17	St. Cloud State	NCHC	33	2	10	12	60	—	—	—	—	—
2017–18	St. Cloud State	NCHC	36	2	13	15	68	—	—	—	—	—
2017–18	Rochester Americans	AHL	8	0	0	0	0	—	—	—	—	—
2018–19	Rochester Americans	AHL	71	3	11	14	56	3	0	0	0	0
2018–19	Buffalo Sabres	NHL	4	0	0	0	0	—	—	—	—	—
2019–20	Rochester Americans	AHL	61	1	10	11	76	—	—	—	—	—
2020–21	Buffalo Sabres	NHL	10	0	0	0	4	—	—	—	—	—
2021–22	Seattle Kraken	NHL	36	2	6	8	28	—	—	—	—	—
2022–23	Seattle Kraken	NHL	82	3	17	20	47	14	1	2	3	8
2023–24	Seattle Kraken	NHL	82	3	22	25	65	—	—	—	—	—
2024–25	Seattle Kraken	NHL	33	1	1	2	9	—	—	—	—	—
2024–25	New York Rangers	NHL	51	4	9	13	33	—	—	—	—	—
2025–26	New York Rangers	NHL	75	5	10	15	41	—	—	—	—	—
NHL totals			373	18	65	83	227	14	1	2	3	8

=== International ===
Year	Team	Event	Result	GP	G	A	Pts	PIM
2016	United States	WJC	3rd place, bronze medalist(s)	7	0	3	3	2
2026	United States	WC	8th	8	0	3	3	0
Junior totals				7	0	3	3	2
Senior totals				8	0	3	3	0

== Awards and honors ==
Award	Year	Ref
College
NCHC All-Rookie Team	2016	
NCHC Best Defensive Defenseman	2018	
NCHC Honorable Mention All-Star Team	2018	

Awards and achievements
Preceded by Tucker Poolman	NCHC Defensive Defenseman of the Year; 2017–18	Succeeded by Jimmy Schuldt
