= St. Cloud State Huskies men's ice hockey =

College ice hockey program

- Current season
- University: St. Cloud State University
- Conference: NCHC
- Head coach: Nick Oliver
- Assistant coaches: R. J. Enga; Clark Kuster; Eric Rud
- Arena: Herb Brooks National Hockey Center; St. Cloud, Minnesota
- Student section: Dog Pound
- Colors: Cardinal and black

NCAA tournament runner-up
- 2021

NCAA tournament Frozen Four
- DI: 2013, 2021; DIII: 1987

NCAA tournament appearances
- DI: 1989, 2000, 2001, 2002, 2003, 2007, 2008, 2010, 2013, 2014, 2015, 2016, 2018, 2019, 2021, 2022, 2023; DIII: 1987

Conference tournament champions
- WIHA: 1977; NCHA: 1987; WCHA: 2001; NCHC: 2016, 2023

Conference regular season champions
- NCHA: 1987; WCHA: 2013; NCHC: 2014, 2018, 2019

Current uniform

The St. Cloud State Huskies men's ice hockey team is a National Collegiate Athletic Association (NCAA) Division I college ice hockey program that represents St. Cloud State University. The Huskies are a member of the National Collegiate Hockey Conference. They play at the Herb Brooks National Hockey Center in St. Cloud, Minnesota.

== History ==
=== Formation and war years ===
St. Cloud State Teachers College founded its varsity ice hockey program in 1931, joining several other Minnesota-based schools. After an expectedly poor first season, St. Cloud began dominating their competition under Ludwig Andolsek, the team's second head coach. During the third year, a freshman named Frank Brimsek served as the team's starter. Brimsek was so spectacular in goal that he left after just one season and began a professional career, a rarity for college players at the time. While Brimsek would go on to have a Hall of Fame career, the Huskies didn't appear to miss him and went 25–2 in 1935, posting the best record in the nation. However, because only one of their games was played against a fellow institution, the Huskies weren't considered for the intercollegiate championship.

Andolsek left after his third season and the team struggled in his absence. In the seven years that followed, the team hovered around .500 and were relegated to secondary status. In 1942, due to the United States entry into World War II, St. Cloud suspended many of its athletic programs, which included the ice hockey team. The program was restarted after the war and saw some success, however, because the program was not a member of any conference, the Huskies were occasionally hamstrung by a lack of playing time.

=== Wink and Basch ===
In 1956, after changing head coaches five times in ten years, the team hired Jack Wink. The new bench boss stabilized the program and led the Huskies to stellar records in the early 1960s. The team finished the 1962 season undefeated but, as had happened a decade earlier, a reduced schedule following those highs caused the team to fall on hard times by the latter part of the decade. After successive 1-win seasons, Wink was replaced by Charlie Basch who began a rebuild of the program.

Basch took almost twice as long as Wink had to turn the Huskies into consistent winners. Once he did, however, he was able to keep them at the top of their game for much longer. In 1978, the NCAA began sponsoring a Division II tournament. Because St. Cloud was one of the few western teams that did not participate in the NAIA Championship, they were invited to participate in a Western Championship Tournament, which would determine which two teams received bids. St. Cloud State played in the WCT for the first four years of its existence, unfortunately they were never able to win a single match and never received an invitation to the actual tournament.

In 1980, the Huskies finally ended their long run as an independent and helped found the NCHA. Poor results in conference play prevented the team from having a chance at an NCAA bid, a trend that continued as almost all Division II programs dropped down to Division III in 1984.

=== Swift climb to D-I ===
John Perpich took over for Basch in 1984 and led the team through two mediocre seasons before the athletic department decided to raise the profile of the program. Perpich stepped aside and allowed legendary Minnesota coach Herb Brooks to take over in 1986. News of the move spurred several prospects to join the program, including NHL draft picks Tony Schmalzbauer and Shorty Forrest. The Huskies went on to win the program's first conference title (tied) and the first conference tournament ever played by the NCHA. Brooks' team was one of the favorites for the national championship despite being a debutant but they were stymied by Oswego State and ended up 3rd in 1987.

Brooks left after the year to return to the NHL, but his time with the team had been a success. The following year, St. Cloud promoted the program to Division I, with Brooks' assistant Craig Dahl taking over. The Huskies continued their rapid ascent with a winning record in 1989 and, due in part to the NCAA's policy of including a non-tradition team in the tournament at the time, St. Cloud made its first appearance in the D-I tournament in 1989.

=== WCHA ===
After three years as an independent, St. Cloud joined the WCHA in 1990. Widely regarded as the best conference at the time, the WCHA made it difficult for St. Cloud to compete for a further NCAA bid. In spite of the tough opposition, the Huskies thrived in their new conference and routinely finished in the top half of the standings. There were several near-misses for championships and tournament bids but, at the end of the 20th century, the Huskies finally returned to the national tournament. In three consecutive years, St. Cloud made the NCAA tournament but lost each game they played. The program then declined for a few years and Dahl stepped down after the 2005 season.

Bob Motzko, an alumnus of the team, took over and swiftly turned the team's fortunes. In his first five seasons he led the Huskies to two WCHA championship games. Though the team lost both, the Huskies got their first win in NCAA tournament play. Three years later, Motzko led the team to its first WCHA regular season title and led the Huskies to the Frozen Four.

=== NCHC ===
After the deep playoff run, St. Cloud State joined with seven other schools to form the NCHC in response to the Big Ten Conference joining the ice hockey ranks. The new league was built around traditional powerhouses and the Huskies looked right at home, winning the inaugural regular season title. Under Motzko, St. Cloud continued as one of the top teams in the conference, receiving 4 NCAA bids over a five-year span. In 2018, St. Cloud was the #1 team in the nation as it began the tournament but were upset in the first game by Air force.

Motzko left after the year to take over at in-state rival Minnesota and he was replaced by Brett Larson. The Huskies only seemed to get better under their new coach and were again the top-seeded team in 2019. Despite dominating play for most of their opening match, the Huskies were again felled by the lowest-seeded team. After a down year that was curtailed by the COVID-19 pandemic, St. Cloud returned with a strong 2021 and reached the championship game for the first time in its history.

== Season-by-season results ==
Source:

== Records vs. current NCHC teams ==
As of the completion of the 2025–26 season

School	Team	Away Arena	Overall record	Win %	Last Result
Arizona State University	Sun Devils	Mullett Arena	5–2–0	.714	4-3 W
Colorado College	Tigers	Ed Robson Arena	68–55–9	.549	1-4 L
University of Denver	Pioneers	Magness Arena	55–63–7	.468	0-6 L
Miami University	RedHawks	Steve Cady Arena	37–22–6	.615	1-3 L
University of Minnesota Duluth	Bulldogs	AMSOIL Arena	85–71–11	.542	1-2 OTL
University of Nebraska Omaha	Mavericks	Baxter Arena	31–21–4	.589	2-1 W
University of North Dakota	Fighting Hawks	Ralph Engelstad Arena	49–86–20	.381	4-6 L
University of St. Thomas	Tommies	Lee & Penny Anderson Arena	7–3–0	.700	1-3 L
Western Michigan University	Broncos	Lawson Arena	26–20–5	.559	5-1 W

== Head coaches ==
As of the completion of the 2025–26 season

Tenure	Coach	Years	Record	Pct.
1931–1932	Ralph Theisen	1	1–7–0	.125
1932–1935	Ludwig Andolsek	3	42–4–1	.904
1935–1936	Robert DePaul	1	6–5–0	.545
1936–1937	Walter Gerzin	1	5–5–0	.500
1937–1938	Benedict Vandell	1	4–4–0	.500
1938–1942	George Lynch	4	20–15–2	.568
1946–1950, 1951–1952	Roland Vandell	5	39–25–2	.606
1950–1951	Ray Gasperline	1	5–3–0	.625
1952–1953	George Martin	1	8–3–0	.727
1953–1954	Brendan McDonald	1	2–2–0	.500
1954–1956	Jim Baxter	2	18–4–1	.804
1956–1968	Jack Wink	12	69–69–2	.500
1968–1984	Charlie Basch	16	181–193–7	.484
1984–1986	John Perpich	2	30–24–4	.554
1986–1987	Herb Brooks	1	25–10–1	.708
1987–2005	Craig Dahl	18	338–309–52	.521
2005–2018	Bob Motzko	13	276–192–49	.581
2018–2026	Brett Larson	8	153–116–23	.563
2026–present	Nick Oliver	1	0–0–0	–
Totals	19 coaches	91 seasons	1,222–989–144	.549

== Players ==
=== Current roster ===
As of August 13, 2025.

No.	Nat.	Player	Class	Pos	Height	Weight	DoB	Hometown	Previous team	NHL rights
1	(Belarus)	Yan Shostak	Freshman	G	6' 0" (1.83 m)	185 lb (84 kg)	2004-05-30	Minsk, Belarus	Lincoln Stars (USHL)	—
3	(United States)	Joe Belisle	Freshman	D	6' 0" (1.83 m)	176 lb (80 kg)	2005-06-06	Hugo, Minnesota	Sioux Falls Stampede (USHL)	—
4	(United States)	Finn Loftus	Sophomore	D	6' 1" (1.85 m)	179 lb (81 kg)	2004-02-12	Blaine, Minnesota	Massachusetts (HEA)	—
5	(United States)	Tanner Henricks	Freshman	D	6' 4" (1.93 m)	205 lb (93 kg)	2006-06-25	Mission Viejo, California	Lincoln Stars (USHL)	CBJ, 101st overall 2024
6	(United States)	Mason Reiners	Senior	D	6' 1" (1.85 m)	195 lb (88 kg)	2001-05-03	Edina, Minnesota	Waterloo Black Hawks (USHL)	—
7	(United States)	Jack Reimann	Junior	F	6' 0" (1.83 m)	195 lb (88 kg)	2002-10-10	Ham Lake, Minnesota	Des Moines Buccaneers (USHL)	—
8	(United States)	Ocean Wallace	Sophomore	F	6' 3" (1.91 m)	216 lb (98 kg)	2003-10-31	Boulder, Colorado	Austin Bruins (NAHL)	—
10	(United States)	Noah Urness	Freshman	F	5' 10" (1.78 m)	181 lb (82 kg)	2005-12-01	Roseau, Minnesota	Sioux Falls Stampede (USHL)	—
11	(United States)	Grant Ahcan	Senior	F	5' 10" (1.78 m)	160 lb (73 kg)	2002-05-18	Savage, Minnesota	Cedar Rapids RoughRiders (USHL)	—
12	(Canada)	Ryan Rosborough	Senior (RS)	F	6' 3" (1.91 m)	190 lb (86 kg)	2000-05-24	Mt. Brydges, Ontario	South Shore Kings (NCDC)	—
13	(Canada)	Tyson Gross	Junior	F	6' 3" (1.91 m)	185 lb (84 kg)	2002-09-23	Calgary, Alberta	Cedar Rapids RoughRiders (USHL)	—
14	(Canada)	Josh Zinger	Senior	D	5' 11" (1.8 m)	185 lb (84 kg)	2001-08-05	Red Deer, Alberta	Northern Michigan (CCHA)	—
15	(United States)	Barrett Hall	Junior	F	6' 0" (1.83 m)	170 lb (77 kg)	2003-12-29	Apple Valley, Minnesota	Green Bay Gamblers (USHL)	SEA, 164th overall 2022
17	(Canada)	Ethan AuCoin	Senior	F	6' 1" (1.85 m)	170 lb (77 kg)	2002-08-10	Calgary, Alberta	Lloydminster Bobcats (AJHL)	—
18	(United States)	Aiden Welch	Freshman	F	6' 2" (1.88 m)	207 lb (94 kg)	2004-05-27	White Bear Lake, Minnesota	Sioux Falls Stampede (USHL)	—
19	(Finland)	Verner Miettinen	Junior	F	5' 11" (1.8 m)	172 lb (78 kg)	2003-04-07	Espoo, Finland	Fargo Force (USHL)	—
20	(United States)	Jack Rogers	Senior	F	6' 1" (1.85 m)	190 lb (86 kg)	2002-09-23	East Northport, New York	Steinbach Pistons (MJHL)	—
21	(United States)	Max Smolinski	Senior	F	5' 11" (1.8 m)	180 lb (82 kg)	2003-04-02	Bloomfield Hills, Michigan	Rensselaer (ECAC)	—
22	(United States)	Nolan Roed	Freshman	F	5' 11" (1.8 m)	185 lb (84 kg)	2005-10-25	White Bear Lake, Minnesota	Tri-City Storm (USHL)	COL, 214th overall 2025
23	(United States)	Austin Burnevik	Sophomore	F	6' 4" (1.93 m)	201 lb (91 kg)	2005-01-03	Ham Lake, Minnesota	Madison Capitols (USHL)	ANA, 182nd overall 2024
25	(United States)	Thor Byfuglien	Junior	D	5' 11" (1.8 m)	174 lb (79 kg)	2003-07-14	Roseau, Minnesota	Chicago Steel (USHL)	—
26	(United States)	Cooper Wylie	Senior	D	6' 1" (1.85 m)	195 lb (88 kg)	2001-10-26	Stillwater, Minnesota	Waterloo Black Hawks (USHL)	—
27	(Canada)	Kaleb Tiessen	Junior	D	6' 5" (1.96 m)	210 lb (95 kg)	2002-06-03	Leamington, Ontario	Maryland Black Bears (NAHL)	—
28	(United States)	Gavyn Thoreson	Sophomore	F	5' 8" (1.73 m)	179 lb (81 kg)	2004-10-30	Andover, Minnesota	Waterloo Black Hawks (USHL)	—
33	(Canada)	James Gray	Junior (RS)	G	6' 3" (1.91 m)	195 lb (88 kg)	2002-05-24	Toronto, Ontario	North York Rangers (OJHL)	—
34	(Canada)	Adam Ingram	Senior	F	6' 1" (1.85 m)	175 lb (79 kg)	2003-10-14	West St. Paul, Manitoba	Youngstown Phantoms (USHL)	NSH, 82nd overall 2022
39	(Latvia)	Patriks Bērziņš	Sophomore	G	6' 1" (1.85 m)	185 lb (84 kg)	2003-08-30	Talsi, Latvia	Maine (HEA)	—
81	(Canada)	Daimon Gardner	Junior	F	6' 5" (1.96 m)	205 lb (93 kg)	2004-01-18	Eagle Lake, Ontario	Clarkson (ECAC)	VAN, 112th overall 2022

== Statistical leaders ==
=== Career points leaders ===
Player	Years	GP	G	A	Pts	PIM
Ryan Lasch	2006–2010	161	79	104	183	98
Jeff Saterdalen	1988–1992	148	78	101	179	130
Garrett Roe	2007–2011	156	65	113	178	240
Tim Hanus	1988–1992	144	73	99	172	147
Mark Hartigan	1999–2002	119	86	79	165	84
Kalle Kossila	2012–2016	157	48	105	153	71
Drew LeBlanc	2008–2013	171	42	105	147	64
Mike Brodzinski	1984–1987		76	70	146	
John Bergo	1980–1984		76	69	145	
Joe Motzko	1999–2003	154	52	90	142	201

=== Career goaltending leaders ===
GP = Games played; Min = Minutes played; W = Wins; L = Losses; T = Ties; GA = Goals against; SO = Shutouts; SV% = Save percentage; GAA = Goals against average

Minimum 30 games

Player	Years	GP	Min	W	L	T	GA	SO	SV%	GAA
Charlie Lindgren	2013–2016	88	4891	51	29	3	180	8	.921	2.21
Bobby Goepfert	2005–2007	73	4412	37	24	11	165	6	.924	2.24
Jaxon Castor	2019–2023	42	2221	20	16	1	88	4	.910	2.38
Scott Meyer	1996–2001	80	4585	47	22	5	182	9	.919	2.38
Dávid Hrenák	2017–2022	146	8370	82	44	14	335	14	.910	2.40

Statistics current through the end of the 2023-24 season.

== Awards and honors ==
=== Hockey Hall of Fame ===
- Frank Brimsek (1966)
- Herb Brooks (2006)

=== United States Hockey Hall of Fame ===
- Frank Brimsek (1973)
- Herb Brooks (1990)

=== NCAA ===
==== Individual awards ====
Hobey Baker Award

- Drew LeBlanc: 2013

Tim Taylor Award

- Andreas Nödl: 2007

==== All-Americans ====
AHCA First Team All-Americans

- 2001–02: Mark Hartigan, F
- 2012–13: Nick Jensen, D; Drew LeBlanc, F
- 2013–14: Nic Dowd, F
- 2016–17: Charlie Lindgren, G; Ethan Prow, D
- 2017–18: Jimmy Schuldt, D
- 2018–19: Jimmy Schuldt, D; Patrick Newell, F

AHCA Second Team All-Americans

- 1992–93: Fred Knipscheer, F
- 1996–97: Mark Parrish, F
- 1999–00: Mike Pudlick, D
- 2000–01: Scott Meyer, G
- 2005–06: Bobby Goepfert, G
- 2006–07: Bobby Goepfert, G
- 2007–08: Ryan Lasch, F
- 2018–19: Jack Ahcan, D; Blake Lizotte, F
- 2023–24: Dylan Anhorn, D

=== WCHA ===
==== Individual awards ====
Player of the Year

- Mark Hartigan: 2002
- Drew LeBlanc: 2013

Outstanding Student-Athlete of the Year

- Kyle McLaughlin: 1999
- Drew LeBlanc: 2013

Defensive Player of the Year

- Nick Jensen: 2013

Freshman of the Year

- Andreas Nödl: 2007

Coach of the Year

- Craig Dahl: 1998
- Bob Motzko: 2006, 2007

Most Valuable Player in tournament

- Tyler Arnason: 2001

==== All-Conference Teams ====
First Team All-WCHA

- 1990-91: Bret Hedican, D
- 1992-93: Fred Knipscheer, F
- 1999-00: Mike Pudlick, D
- 2000-01: Scott Meyer, G
- 2001-02: Mark Hartigan, F
- 2005-06: Bobby Goepfert, G
- 2006-07: Bobby Goepfert, G; Andrew Gordon, F
- 2007-08: Ryan Lasch, F
- 2008-09: Ryan Lasch, F
- 2012-13: Nick Jensen, D; Drew LeBlanc, F

Second Team All-WCHA

- 1993-94: Kelly Hultgren, D
- 1994-95: Kelly Hultgren, D
- 1996-97: Dave Paradise, F; Matt Cullen, F
- 1997-98: Brian Leitza, G
- 1999-00: Scott Meyer, G; Tyler Arnason, F
- 2000-01: Duvie Wescott, D
- 2001-02: Dean Weasler, G; Nate DiCasmirro, F
- 2007-08: Andreas Nödl, F; Garrett Roe, F
- 2008-09: Garrett Raboin, D
- 2009-10: Ryan Lasch, F

Third Team All-WCHA

- 1995–96: Taj Melson, F
- 1996–97: Sacha Molin, F
- 1997–98: Josh DeWolf, F
- 2000–01: Mark Hartigan, F; Brandon Sampair, F
- 2006–07: Andreas Nödl, F
- 2008–09: Garrett Roe, F
- 2009–10: Dan Dunn, G; Garrett Raboin, D; Garrett Roe, F
- 2010–11: Drew LeBlanc, F
- 2011–12: Nick Jensen, D

All-WCHA Rookie Team

- 1991–92: Sandy Gasseau, F
- 1994–95: Brian Leitza, G
- 1995–96: Matt Cullen, F
- 1998–99: Tyler Arnason, F
- 2001–02: Matt Gens, D; Mike Doyle, F; Peter Szabo, F
- 2006–07: Andreas Nödl, F; Ryan Lasch, F
- 2007–08: Garrett Roe, F
- 2011–12: Andrew Prochno, D

=== NCHC ===
==== Individual awards ====
Player of the Year

- Ethan Prow; 2016
- Jimmy Schuldt; 2019

Rookie of the Year

- Veeti Miettinen; 2021

Goaltender of the Year

- Charlie Lindgren; 2016

Forward of the Year

- Patrick Newell; 2019

Defensive Forward of the Year

- Nic Dowd; 2014
- Jami Krannila; 2023

Defenseman of the Year

- Ethan Prow; 2016

Defensive Defenseman of the Year

- Will Borgen; 2018
- Jimmy Schuldt; 2019

Offensive Defenseman of the Year

- Ethan Prow; 2016

Scholar-Athlete of the Year

- Nic Dowd; 2014

Sportsmanship Award

- Nick Oliver; 2015
- Patrick Newell; 2019
- Kevin Fitzgerald; 2021
- Spencer Meier; 2023

Herb Brooks Coach of the Year

- Bob Motzko; 2014, 2018
- Brett Larson; 2019

Frozen Faceoff MVP

- Mikey Eyssimont; 2016
- Jami Krannila; 2023

==== All-Conference Teams ====
First Team All-NCHC

- 2013–14: Nic Dowd, F
- 2014–15: Jonny Brodzinski, F
- 2015–16: Charlie Lindgren, G; Ethan Prow, D
- 2017–18: Jimmy Schuldt, D
- 2018–19: Jimmy Schuldt, D; Patrick Newell, F; Ryan Poehling, F; Blake Lizotte, F
- 2021–22: Nick Perbix, D
- 2022–23: Jami Krannila, F
- 2023–24: Dylan Anhorn, D

Second Team All-NCHC

- 2013–14: Ryan Faragher, G
- 2015–16: Joey Benik, F; Kalle Kossila, F
- 2017–18: Mikey Eyssimont, F
- 2018–19: Dávid Hrenák, G; Jack Ahcan, D
- 2019–20: Dávid Hrenák, G; Jack Ahcan, D
- 2020–21: Nick Perbix, D; Veeti Miettinen, F
- 2021–22: Kevin Fitzgerald, F
- 2022–23: Jack Peart, D
- 2023–24: Jack Peart, D

NCHC All-Rookie Team

- 2013–14: Charlie Lindgren, G
- 2014–15: Patrick Russell, F
- 2015–16: Jimmy Schuldt, D; Will Borgen, F
- 2016–17: Jack Ahcan, D
- 2017–18: Dávid Hrenák, G; Blake Lizotte, F; Easton Brodzinski, F
- 2018–19: Nick Perbix, D; Nolan Walker, F
- 2020–21: Veeti Miettinen, F
- 2023–24: Isak Posch, G
- 2024–25: Austin Burnevik, F; Colin Ralph, F

== Olympians ==
This is a list of St. Cloud State alumni who were a part of an Olympic team.

Name	Position	St. Cloud State Tenure	Team	Year	Finish
Bret Hedican	Defenseman	1988–1991	(United States) USA	1992, 2006	4th, 8th
Mark Parrish	Right Wing	1995–1997	(United States) USA	2006	8th
Ryan Malone	Left Wing	1999–2003	(United States) USA	2010	Silver
Garrett Roe	Left Wing	2007–2011	(United States) USA	2018	7th
Sam Hentges	Left Wing	2018–Present	(United States) USA	2022	5th
Nick Perbix	Defenseman	2018–Present	(United States) USA	2022	5th
Patrick Russell	Right Wing	2013–2015	(Denmark) DEN	2022, 2026	7th, 9th
Oliver Lauridsen	Defenseman	2008–2011	(Denmark) DEN	2022, 2026	7th, 9th

== Huskies in the NHL ==
As of July 1, 2025.

= NHL All-Star team	= NHL All-Star	= NHL All-Star and NHL All-Star team	= Hall of Famers

Player	Position	Team(s)	Years	Games	Stanley Cups
Jack Ahcan	Defenseman	BOS, Colorado Avalanche	2020–Present	11	0
Tyler Arnason	Center	CHI, OTT, COL	2001–2009	487	0
Casey Borer	Defenseman	CAR	2007–2010	16	0
Will Borgen	Defenseman	BUF, SEA, NYR	2018–Present	298	0
Frank Brimsek	Goaltender	BOS, CHI	1938–1950	514	2
Jonny Brodzinski	Center	LAK, SJS, NYR	2016–Present	209	0
Dennis Cholowski	Defenseman	DET, SEA, WSH, NYI, NJD	2018–2023	156	0
Tim Conboy	Right Wing	CAR	2007–2010	59	0
Matt Cullen	Center	ANA, FLA, CAR, NYR, OTT, MIN, NSH, PIT, OTT	1997–2019	1,516	3
Nic Dowd	Center	LAK, VAN, WSH	2015–Present	582	0
Len Esau	Center	TOR, QUE, CGY, EDM	1991–1995	27	0
Mikey Eyssimont	Left Wing	WIN, SJS, TBL, SEA	2021–Present	213	0
Jeff Finger	Defenseman	COL, TOR	2006–2010	199	0
Andrew Gordon	Left Wing	WSH, ANA, VAN	2008–2013	55	0
Kevin Gravel	Defenseman	LAK, EDM, TOR, NSH	2015–Present	138	0
Ben Hanowski	Right Wing	CGY	2012–2014	16	0
Mark Hartigan	Center	ATL, CBJ, ANA, DET	2001–2008	102	0
Bret Hedican	Defenseman	STL, VAN, FLA, CAR, ANA	1991–2009	1,039	1
Matt Hendricks	Center	COL, NSH, EDM, WIN, MIN	2008–2019	607	0
Joe Jensen	Left Wing	CAR	2007–2008	6	0

Player	Position	Team(s)	Years	Games	Stanley Cups
Nick Jensen	Defenseman	DET, WSH, OTT	2016–Present	633	0
Fred Knipscheer	Center	BOS, STL	1993–1996	28	0
Kalle Kossila	Left Wing	ANA	2016–2019	17	0
Oliver Lauridsen	Defenseman	PHI	2012–2015	16	0
Drew LeBlanc	Center	CHI	2012–2013	2	0
Charlie Lindgren	Goaltender	MTL, STL, WSH	2015–Present	149	0
Blake Lizotte	Center	LAK, PIT	2018–Present	379	0
Jon Lizotte	Defenseman	MIN	2021–2022	1	0
Ryan Malone	Right Wing	PIT, TBL, NYR	2003–2015	647	0
Steve Martinson	Right Wing	DET, MTL, MNS	1987–1992	49	0
Joe Motzko	Right Wing	CBJ, ANA, WSH, ATL	2003–2009	25	1
Andreas Nödl	Right Wing	PHI, CAR	2008–2013	183	0
Mark Parrish	Right Wing	FLA, NYI, LAK, MIN, DAL, TBL, BUF	1998–2011	722	0
Nick Perbix	Defenseman	TBL	2022–Present	220	0
Ryan Poehling	Right Wing	MTL, PIT, PHI	2018–Present	283	0
Ethan Prow	Defenseman	BUF	2021–2022	4	0
Nate Raduns	Right Wing	PHI	2008–2009	1	0
Patrick Russell	Right Wing	EDM	2018–2021	59	0
Jimmy Schuldt	Defenseman	VGK, SJS	2018–Present	9	0
Duvie Westcott	Defenseman	CBJ	2001–2008	201	0

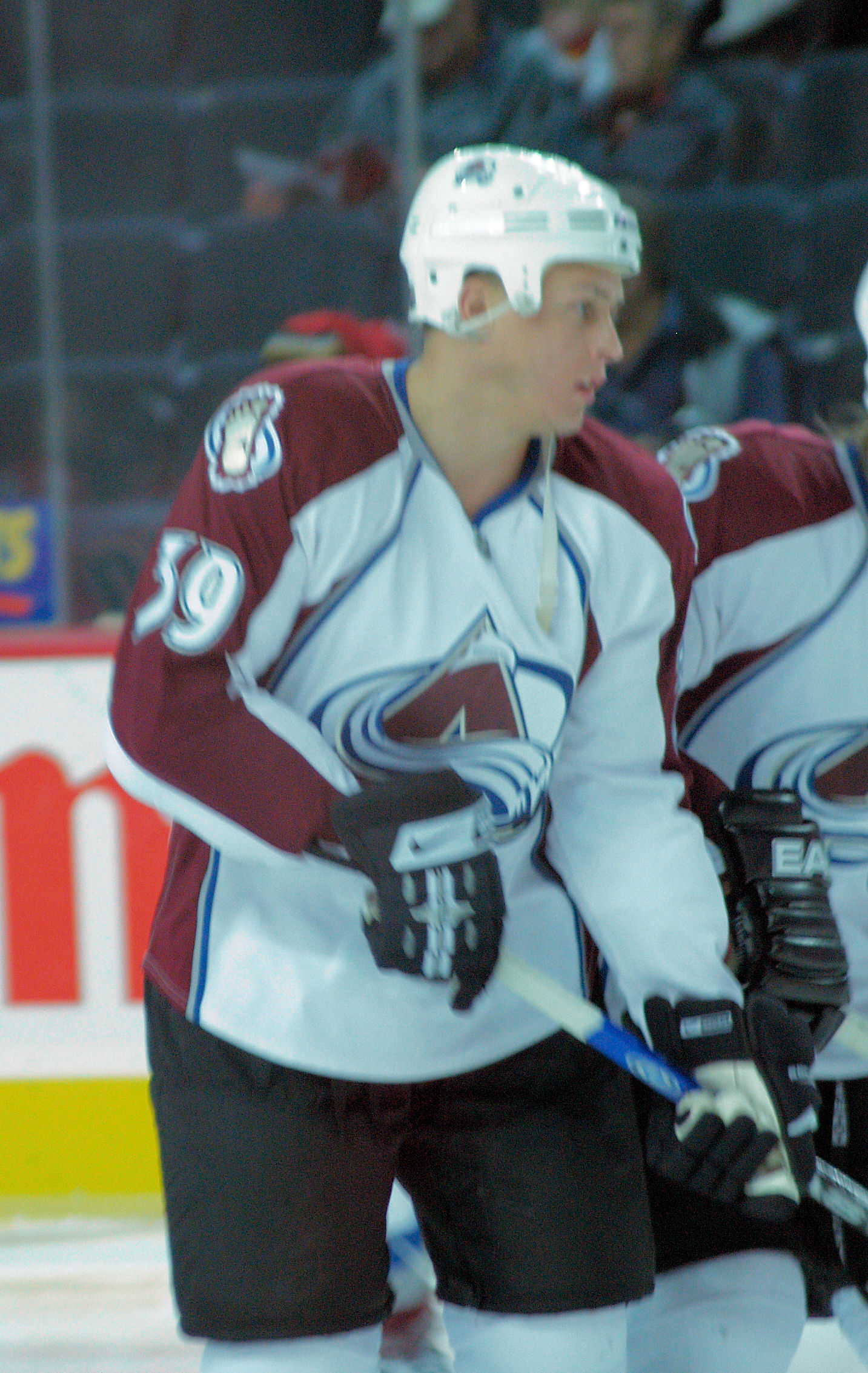
Tyler Arnason

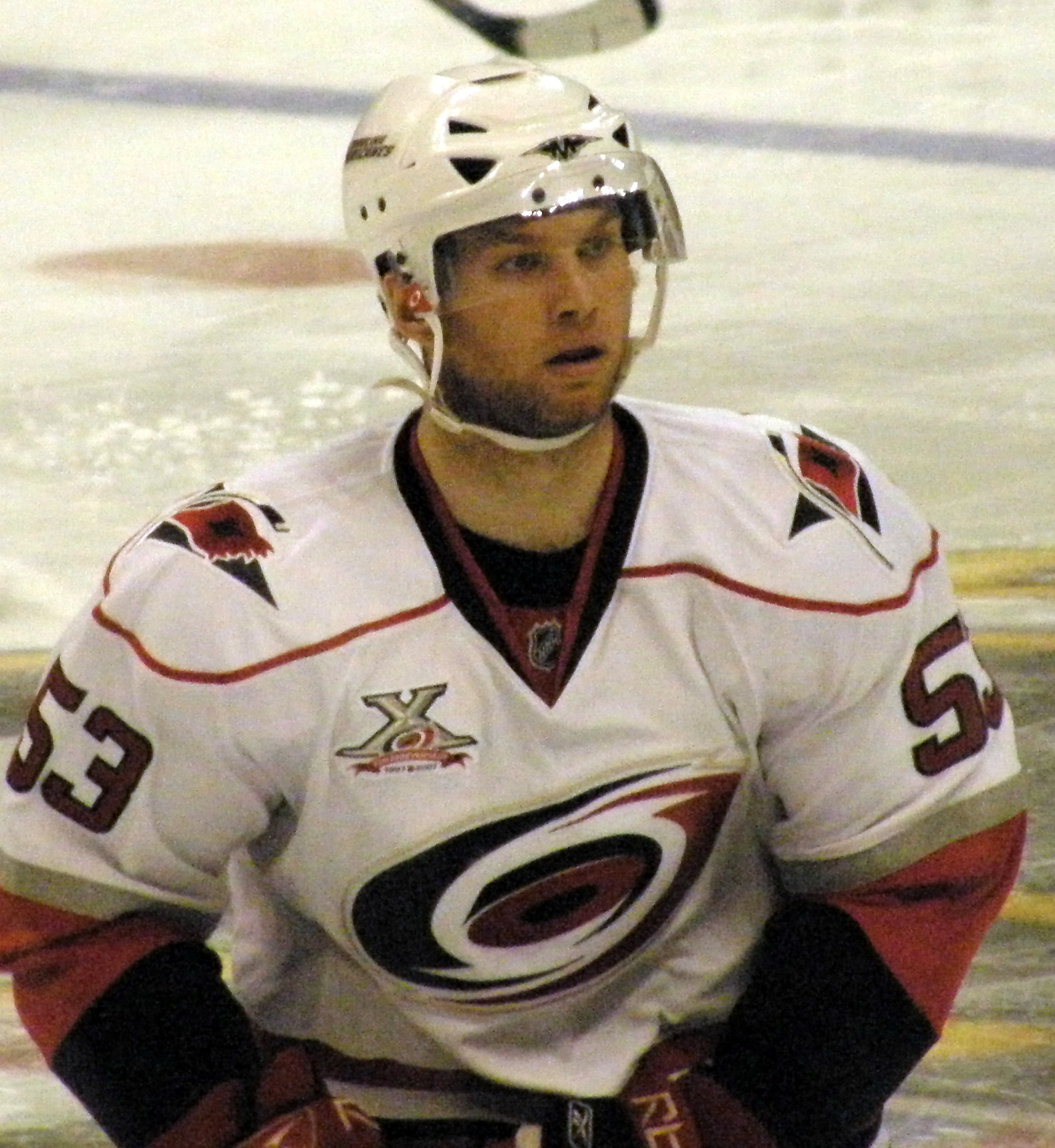
Casey Borer

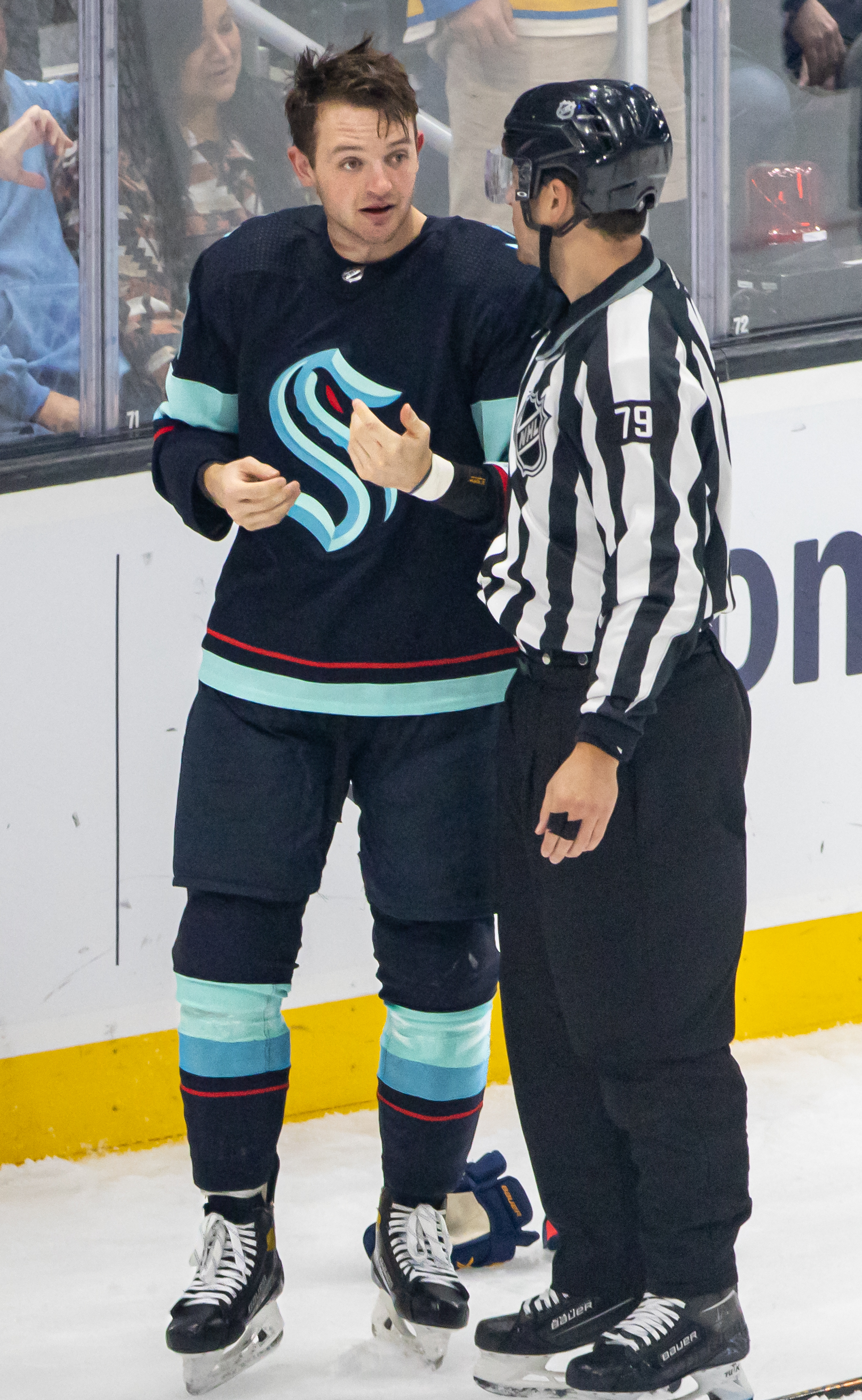
Will Borgen

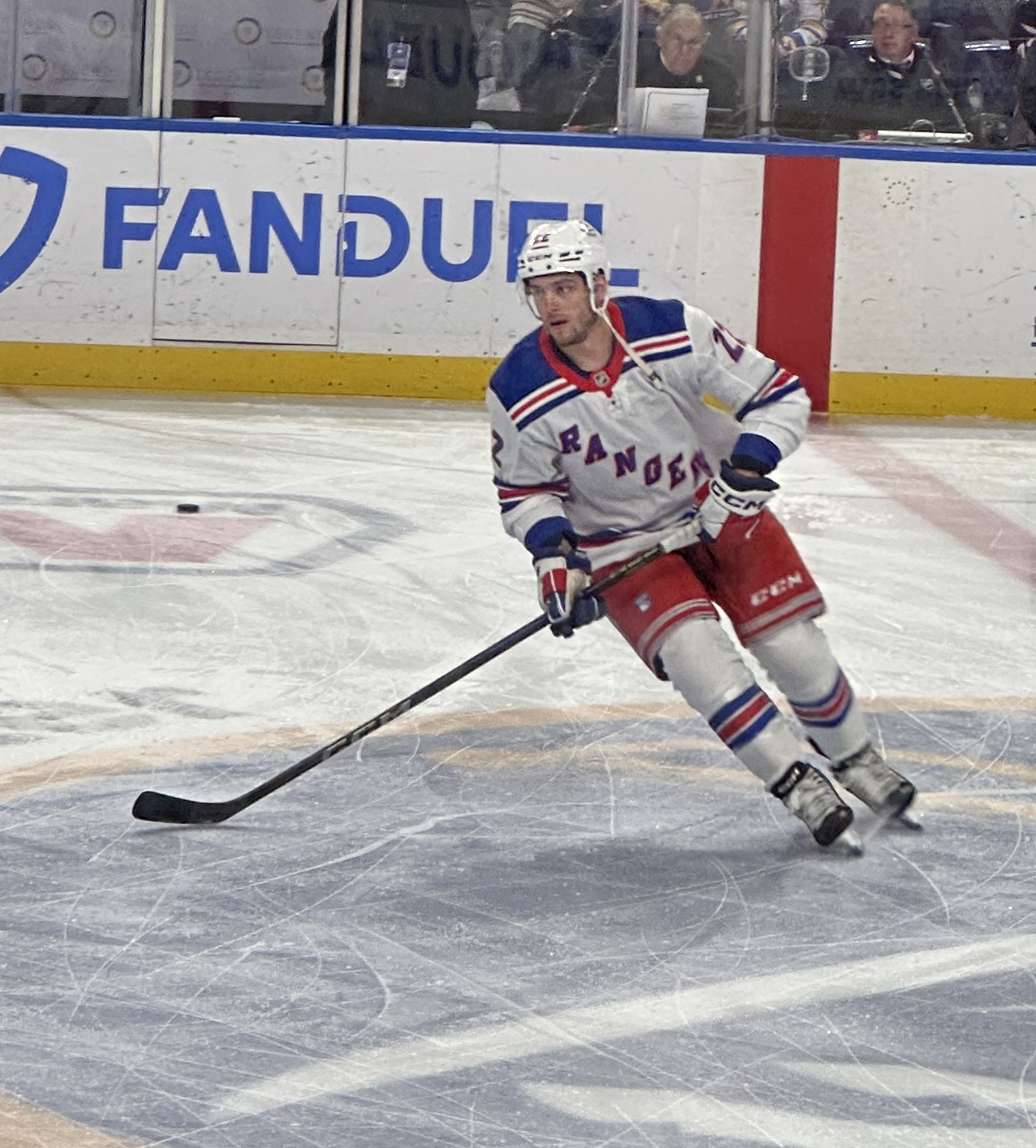
Jonny Brodzinski

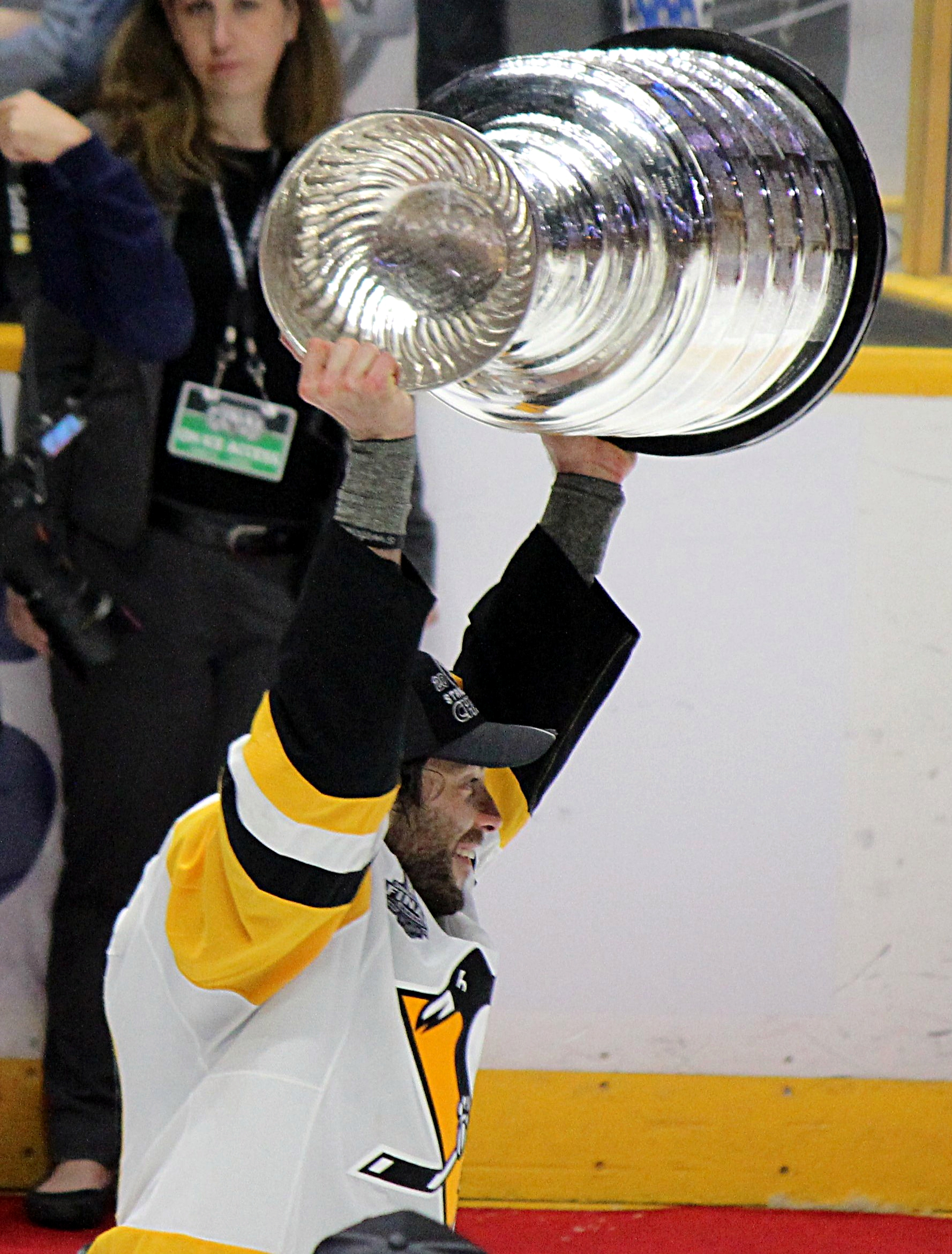
Matt Cullen

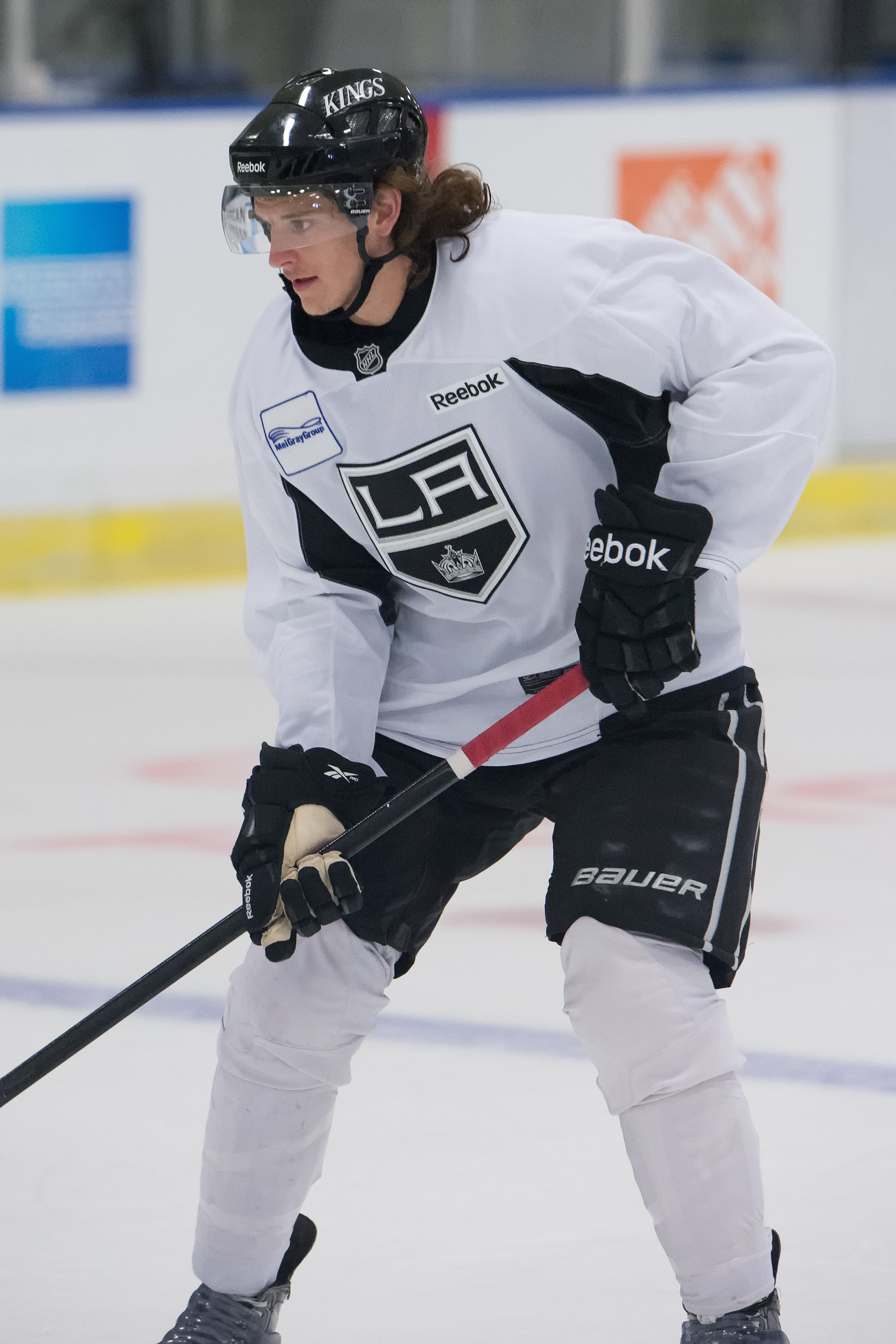
Nic Dowd

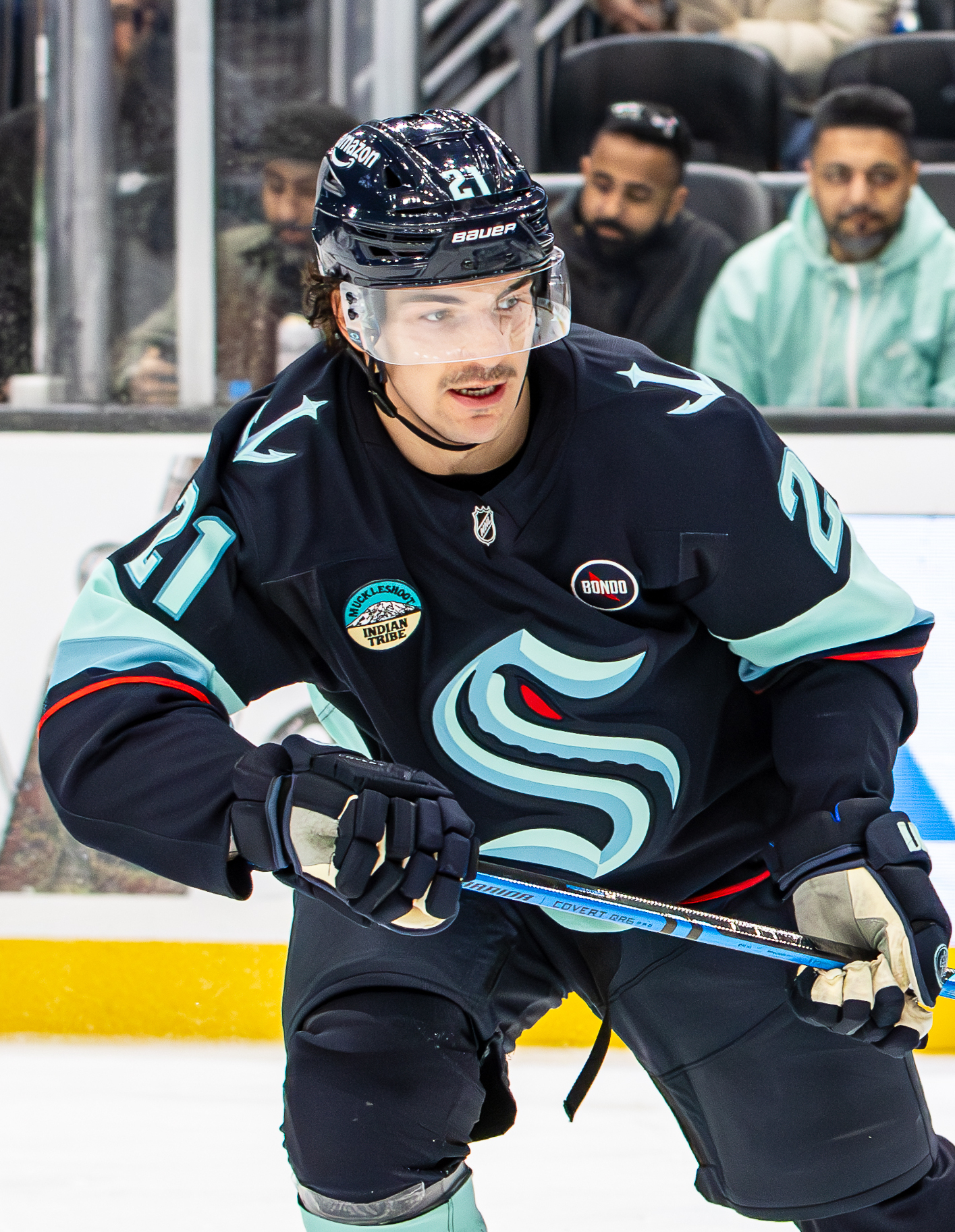
Mikey Eyssimont

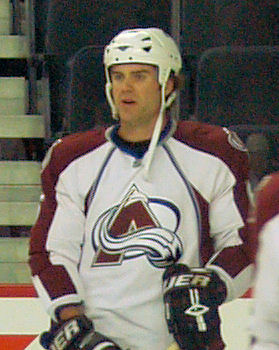
Jeff Finger

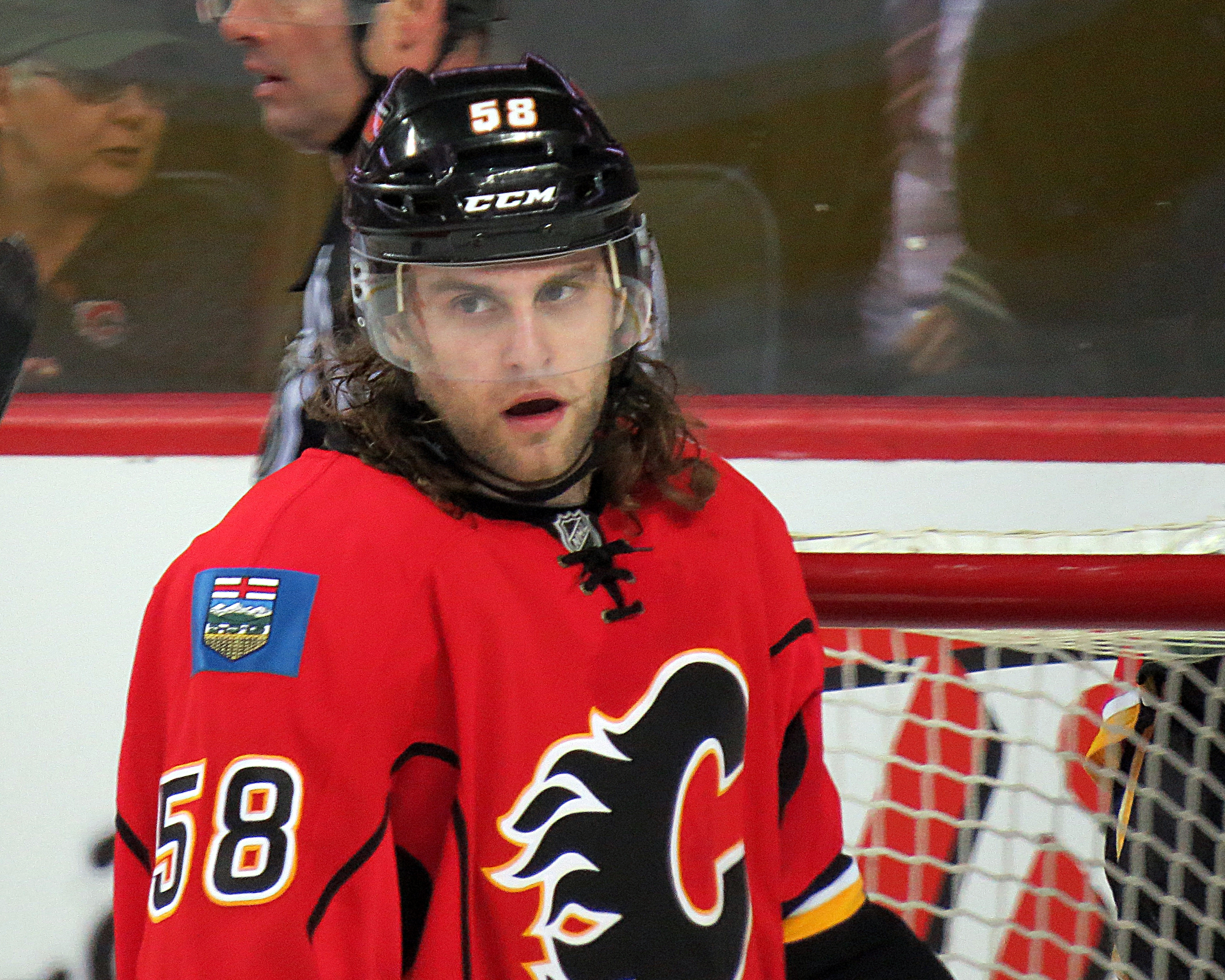
Ben Hanowski

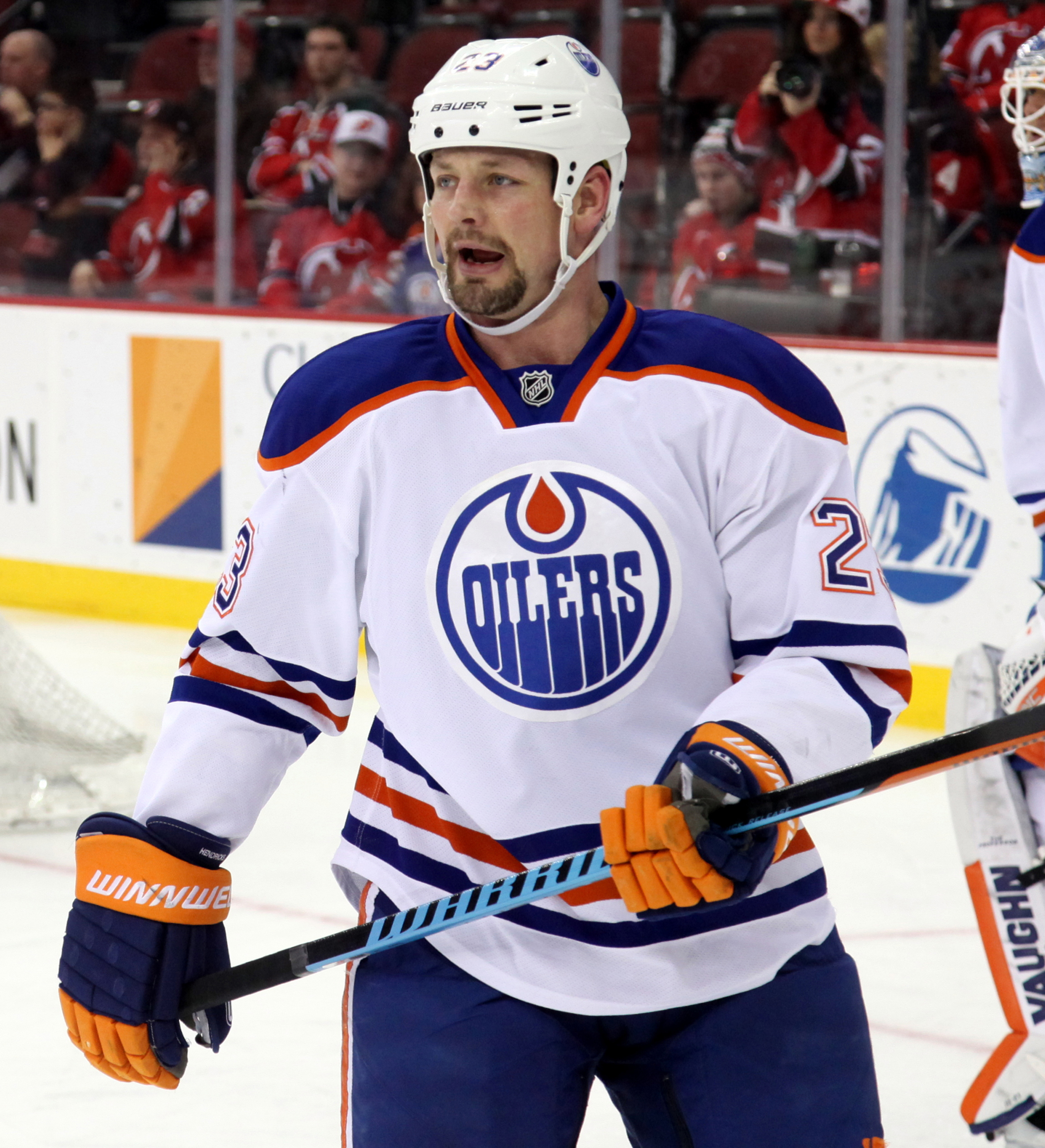
Matt Hendricks

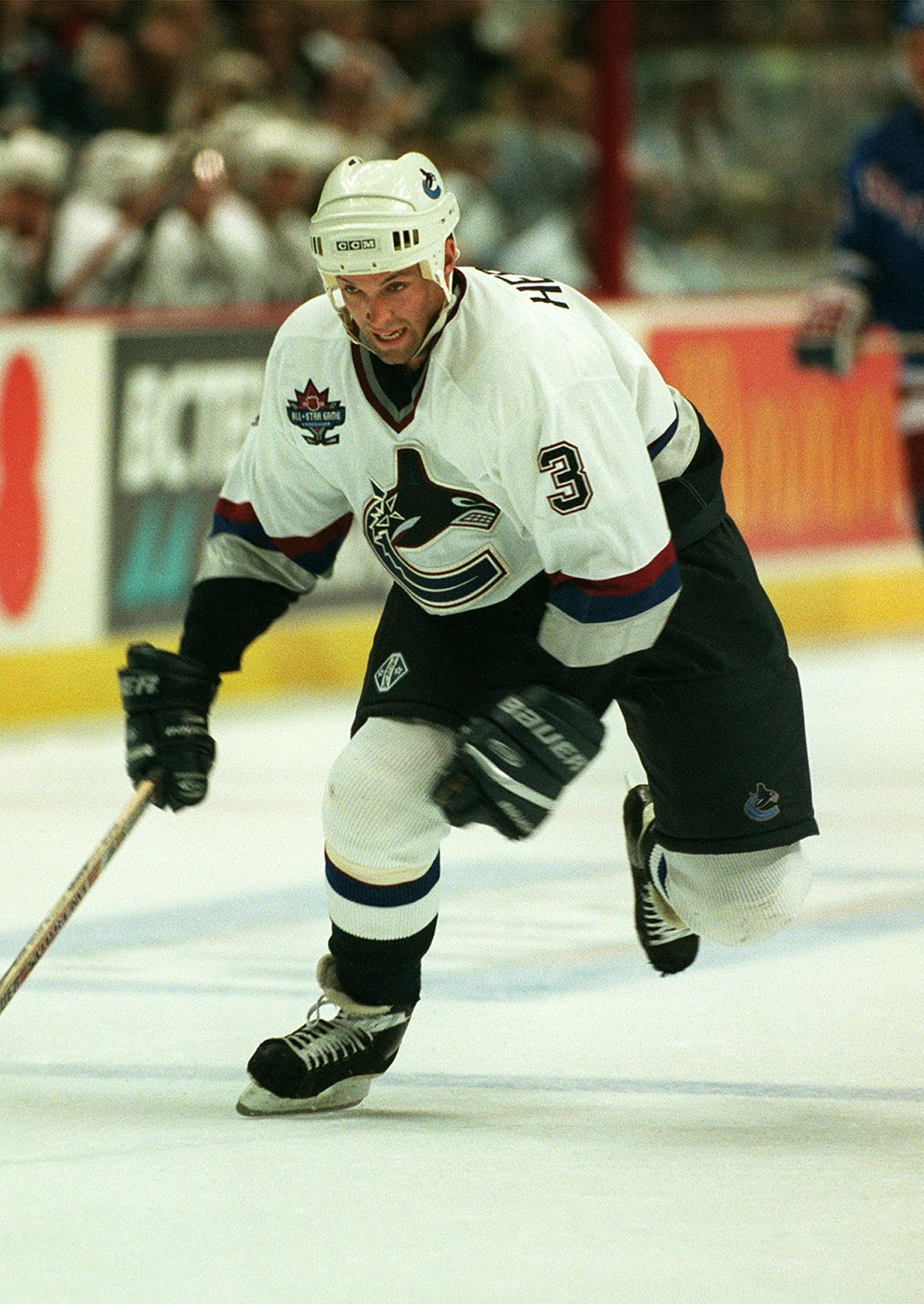
Bret Hedican

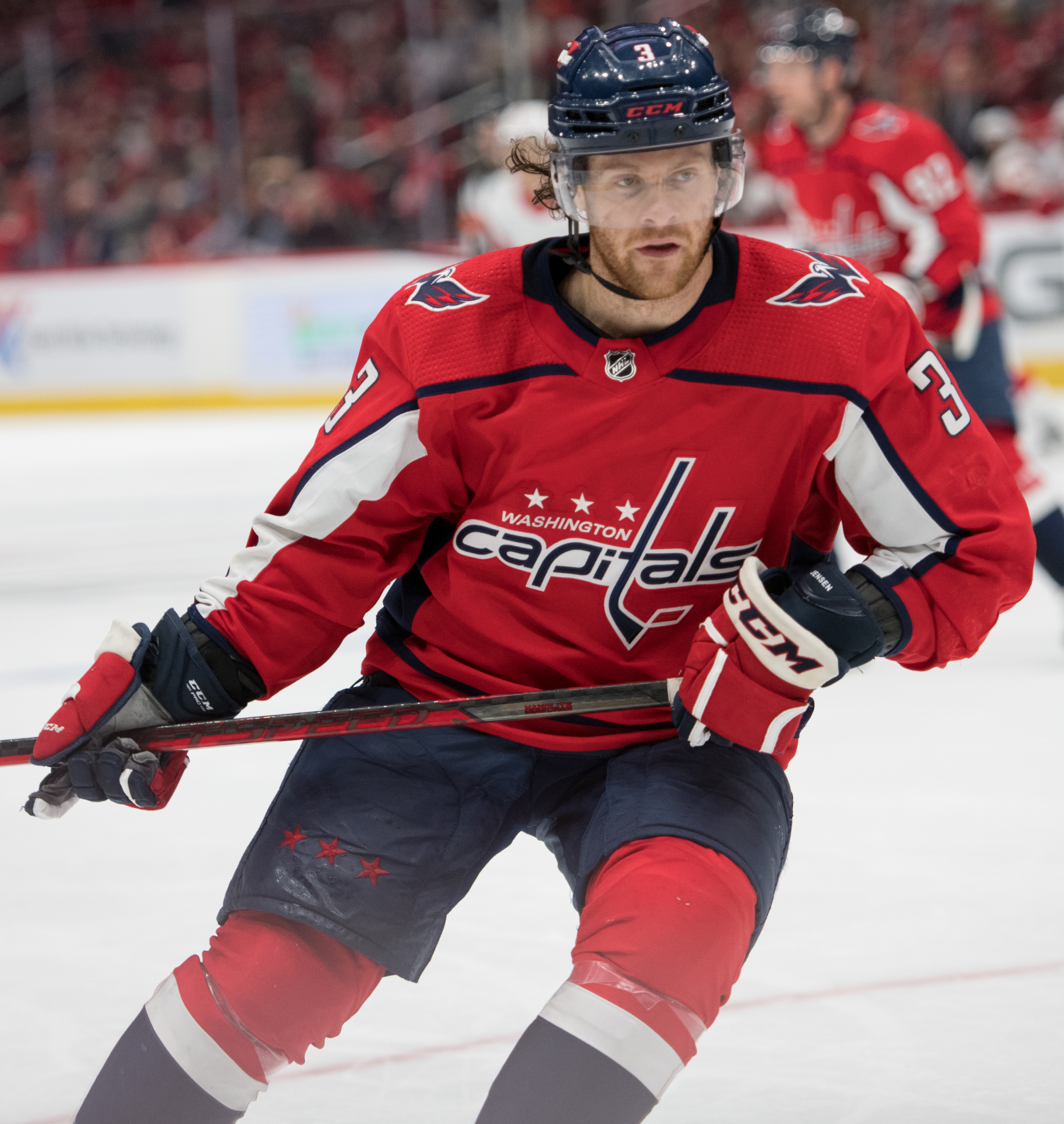
Nick Jensen

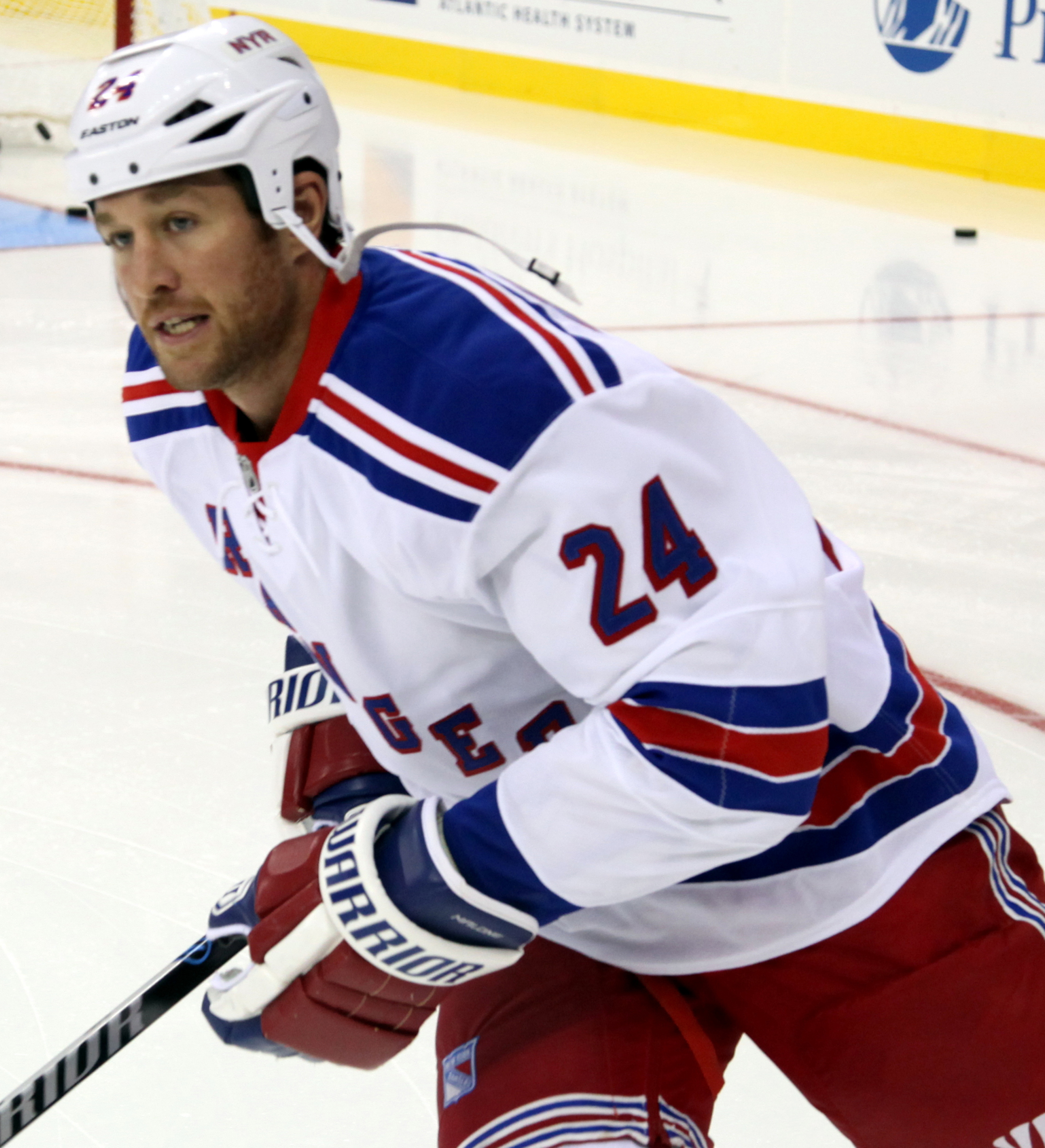
Ryan Malone

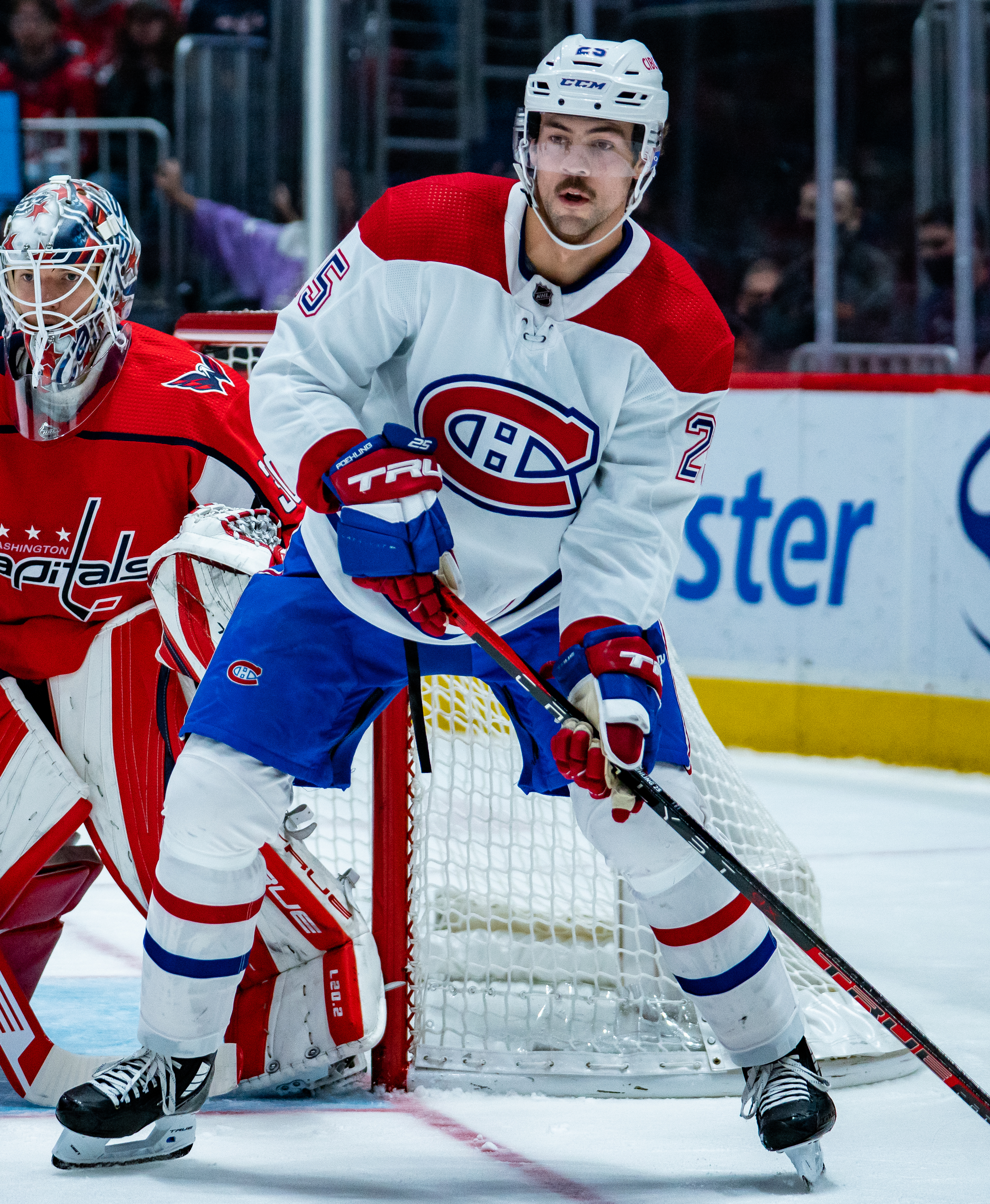
Ryan Poehling

== See also ==
- St. Cloud State Huskies women's ice hockey
- St. Cloud State Huskies
- St. Cloud State University
