= Tucker Poolman =

American ice hockey player (born 1993)

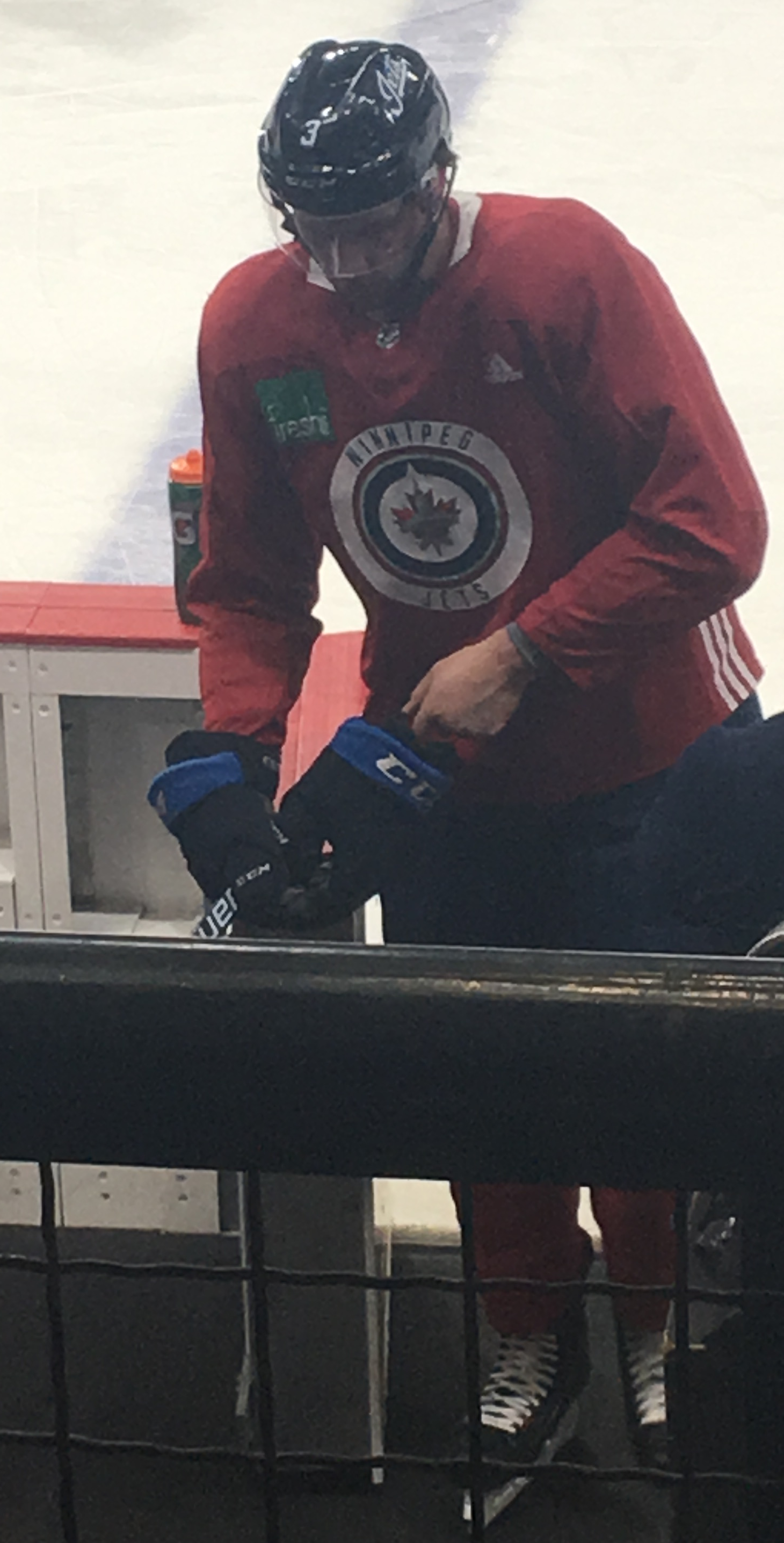
- Poolman with the Winnipeg Jets in 2020
- Born: June 8, 1993 (age 33) Dubuque, Iowa, U.S.
- Height: 6 ft 2 in (188 cm)
- Weight: 216 lb (98 kg; 15 st 6 lb)
- Position: Defense
- Shot: Right
- Played for: Winnipeg Jets; Vancouver Canucks
- NHL draft: 127th overall, 2013; Winnipeg Jets
- Playing career: 2017–2025

Tucker Poolman (born June 8, 1993) is an American former professional ice hockey defenseman who played for the Vancouver Canucks and Winnipeg Jets.

== Playing career ==
=== Early career ===
Born in Iowa, Poolman grew up in East Grand Forks, Minnesota where he played for the local high school hockey team. After going undrafted in the NHL entry draft, Poolman tried out for three teams in the North American Hockey League (NAHL) and United States Hockey League (USHL) before being accepted onto the NAHL's Wichita Falls Wildcats. In 2012, he committed to play NCAA Division I hockey for the University of North Dakota, his father's alma mater. After playing with the Wildcats for one year, he was drafted by the Omaha Lancers in the USHL. In his first season on the team, Poolman was named to the 2013–14 USHL First All-Star Team, and was presented with the Dave Tyler Junior Player of the Year Award, as the most outstanding American-born player in junior hockey.

=== Collegiate ===
Poolman played for the University of North Dakota Fighting Hawks in the National Collegiate Athletic Association (NCAA) for three seasons, leaving with a degree in economics by taking summer school classes. In his freshman season with the Fighting Hawks, Poolman was selected for the 2014–15 Academic All-Conference Team after earning a GPA of 3.0 or higher. He recorded his first collegiate goal on October 18, 2014 in a 3–1 win over the Colorado College Tigers. He ended the 2014–15 season one power play goal away from tying North Dakota's single-season record for a freshman defenseman.

In his sophomore season, Poolman recorded a career-high 24 points and 19 assists, which ranked fifth among NCHC defensemen. As a result, he was named to the NCAA Midwest Region All-Tournament Team. In his last year on the team, Poolman recorded a breakout season with a career-high 30 points. He became the first defenseman from North Dakota to reach 30 points since 2010–11. During the week of March 6, he was named National Collegiate Hockey Conference (NCHC) Defenseman of the Week after recording a conference-leading five points. After the season, Poolman was the recipient of multiple awards including AHCA/CCM All-America West First Team, All-NCHC First Team, and the inaugural NCHC Defensive Defenseman of the Year Award.

=== Professional ===
Poolman was selected by the Winnipeg Jets of the National Hockey League (NHL) in the fifth round, 127th overall, of the 2013 NHL entry draft. Poolman drew comparisons with former Jets defenseman Dustin Byfuglien for his physical play, and ability to play both as a forward and as a defenseman. Having completed his junior season with the Fighting Hawks, Poolman ended his collegiate career in agreeing to a one-year, entry-level contract on March 31, 2017. However, he underwent reconstructive surgery on both of his shoulders and missed the rest of the rest of the season. He began the 2017–18 season with Winnipeg and made his NHL debut on October 9, 2017, in a 5–2 win against the Edmonton Oilers. He recorded his first career NHL goal on December 23, against the New York Islanders. He was reassigned to the Jets' American Hockey League (AHL) affiliate, the Manitoba Moose, until January 24, 2018, when he was recalled to replace an injured Shawn Matthias. He finished the season playing in 24 games with Winnipeg, registering one goal and two points and 17 games with Manitoba, scoring one goal and ten points. He made his NHL playoff debut during the 2018 Stanley Cup playoffs when he replaced the injured Tyler Myers on April 17, 2018 in Game 4 of the first round series versus the Minnesota Wild. He played in one more playoff game that year, going scoreless.

For the 2018–19 season, Poolman was assigned to the Manitoba Moose. In a November 23 game against the Iowa Wild, Poolman suffered a concussion in a collision and missed 17 games. Upon his return, he was used in all situations, appearing in 43 games with Manitoba, recording five goals and 25 points. Poolman graduated to the NHL on a permanent basis in the 2019–20 season. He appeared in 57 games with Winnipeg, scoring four goals and 16 points, skating on the third defense pairing with Nathan Beaulieu. He suffered a leg injury in January 2020, missing some time before returning in February. However, the NHL suspended the season due to the COVID-19 pandemic on March 12, 2020. In the pandemic-delayed 2020 Stanley Cup playoffs, the Jets faced the Calgary Flames in the qualifying round and Poolman took a puck to the face in Game 3. He missed no time, but the Jets were eliminated in four games. In four playoff games, he went scoreless.

In the pandemic-shortened 2020–21 season, Poolman was again a member of the Jets blueline. However, after the Jets' season opener, Poolman was diagnosed with COVID-19 in January and returned to the lineup in February. However, later that month, he suffered a lower body injury on February 21. He appeared in 39 games, registering just one assist. The Jets made the 2021 Stanley Cup playoffs and Poolman scored his first playoff goal on May 19, 2021 against the Edmonton Oilers in their first round series. In eight playoff games, he registered one goal and two points as the Jets were eliminated by the Montreal Canadiens in the second round.

As an unrestricted free agent following four seasons within the Jets organization, Poolman was signed to a four-year contract with the Vancouver Canucks on July 28, 2021. He made his Canucks debut on opening night for the 2021–22 season on October 13, he was paired with Quinn Hughes in a 3–2 loss to the Edmonton Oilers. He registered his first point with Vancouver on October 21 assisting on Conor Garland's third period goal in a 4–1 victory over the Chicago Blackhawks. He scored his first goal with Vancouver on November 17, adding an assist as well, in a 4–2 loss to the Colorado Avalanche. On January 27, 2022, he left a game feeling unwell and missed 26 games with headaches and migraines. He returned in April playing with Travis Dermott and did not finish his first game back in the lineup, leaving the game in the first period, suffering from the same symptoms. He finished the season appearing in 40 games, scoring one goal and three points. In the offseason he trained to get back in game shape and played in three games, notching one point, in the 2022–23 season. However, he left the second game on October 15 versus the Philadelphia Flyers in the first period. He played one final game on October 18 and was placed on injured reserve, due to what were described as migraine and concussion-related complications. Though not made public until January 30, 2026, Poolman was diagnosed with autoimmune autonomic ganglionopathy (AAG) on March 9, 2023.

Poolman was traded to the Colorado Avalanche on October 6, 2024 along with a 2025 fourth-round draft pick for defenseman Erik Brännström. Despite being confirmed to miss the entirety of the season, Poolman was acquired by the Avalanche due to salary cap compliance implications, remaining on the club's long-term injury list. Poolman retired following the end of his final contract due to recurrent AAG flare-ups.

== Personal life ==
Poolman was born to parents Mark and LeAnne. His father Mark was a hockey trainer for the Dubuque Fighting Saints and the University of North Dakota. His younger brother Colton also played for the University of North Dakota's Fighting Hawks and is currently signed with the Calgary Flames. Poolman is a practising Christian and previously gathered with former teammates Mark Scheifele, Josh Morrissey, and Adam Lowry to pray and talk.

== Career statistics ==
			Regular season					Playoffs
Season	Team	League	GP	G	A	Pts	PIM	GP	G	A	Pts	PIM
2008–09	East Grand Forks High	HSMN	25	3	4	7	2	—	—	—	—	—
2009–10	East Grand Forks High	HSMN	25	3	7	10	10	2	0	2	2	0
2010–11	East Grand Forks High	HSMN	23	5	17	22	13	2	0	0	0	0
2011–12	Wichita Falls Wildcats	NAHL	59	7	22	29	29	—	—	—	—	—
2012–13	Omaha Lancers	USHL	64	14	14	28	49	—	—	—	—	—
2013–14	Omaha Lancers	USHL	58	15	26	41	23	4	1	3	4	4
2014–15	University of North Dakota	NCHC	40	8	10	18	16	—	—	—	—	—
2015–16	University of North Dakota	NCHC	40	5	19	24	4	—	—	—	—	—
2016–17	University of North Dakota	NCHC	38	7	23	30	14	—	—	—	—	—
2017–18	Winnipeg Jets	NHL	24	1	1	2	0	2	0	0	0	0
2017–18	Manitoba Moose	AHL	17	1	9	10	4	—	—	—	—	—
2018–19	Manitoba Moose	AHL	43	5	20	25	10	—	—	—	—	—
2019–20	Winnipeg Jets	NHL	57	4	12	16	24	4	0	0	0	2
2020–21	Winnipeg Jets	NHL	39	0	1	1	2	8	1	1	2	0
2021–22	Vancouver Canucks	NHL	40	1	2	3	12	—	—	—	—	—
2022–23	Vancouver Canucks	NHL	3	0	1	1	0	—	—	—	—	—
NHL totals			163	6	17	23	38	14	1	1	2	2

== Awards and honours ==
Award	Year
USHL
First All-Star Team	2014
All-Star Game	2014
Dave Tyler Junior Player of the Year Award	2014
College
NCHC First All-Star Team	2016–17
NCHC Best Defensive Defenseman	2016–17
West First All-American Team	2016–17
NCHC All-Tournament Team	2017

Awards and achievements
Preceded by Award created	NCHC Defensive Defenseman of the Year; 2016–17	Succeeded by Will Borgen
