= Nick Oliver =

American ice hockey player (born 1991)

Current position
- Title: Head coach
- Team: St. Cloud State
- Conference: NCHC

Biographical details
- Born: May 4, 1991 (age 35); Wannaska, Minnesota, U.S.
- Education: St. Cloud State University

Playing career
- 2008–2011: Fargo Force
- 2011–2015: St. Cloud State
- Position: Forward

Coaching career (HC unless noted)
- 2016–2018: Sioux Falls Stampede (assistant)
- 2018–2022: St. Cloud State (assistant)
- 2022–2023: Fargo Force
- 2023–2026: Wisconsin (assistant)
- 2026–present: St. Cloud State

Head coaching record
- Overall: 0–0–0 (–)

Nick Oliver (born May 4, 1991) is an American former ice hockey player, and current head coach of the St. Cloud State Huskies men's ice hockey team.

== Playing career ==
Oliver played three seasons of junior hockey with the Fargo Force from 2008 to 2011. He then played college ice hockey at St. Cloud State. During the 2012–13 season, he recorded one goal and five assists in 34 games, and helped the Huskies advance to the Frozen Four for the first time in program history. He was named team captain for the 2014–15 season. During his senior year he won the NCHC Sportsmanship Award. He finished his collegiate career with seven goals and 12 assists in 145 games.

== Coaching career ==
Oliver began his coaching career as an assistant coach and director of scouting for the Sioux Falls Stampede from 2016 to 2018. On May 2, 2018, he was named an assistant coach for St. Cloud State. In four years as an assistant coach, he helped lead the Huskies to an 81–44–9 record and three NCAA tournaments. During the 2018–19 season, in his first season with the team, they finished with a 30–6–3 record and won the NCHC regular season championship with a conference record 19 wins. They also advanced to their first NCAA national championship game.

He then served as the head coach of the Fargo Force during the 2022–23 season. In his lone season with the team, he led the Force to a 40–14–4–4 record, a league-best 88 points and the franchise's first Anderson Cup as regular-season champions. Following the season he was named USHL Coach of the Year.

On May 25, 2023, he was named an assistant coach for Wisconsin. He served as an assistant for three seasons at Wisconsin, and helped lead the Badgers to two NCAA tournaments. During the 2025–26 season, the Badgers advanced to the Frozen Four and national championship game for the first time since 2010.

On April 12, 2026, he was named head coach for St. Cloud State. At 34 years old, he is the second-youngest head coach of any NCAA Division I men's ice hockey program.
