= Karson Kuhlman =

American ice hockey player (born 1995)

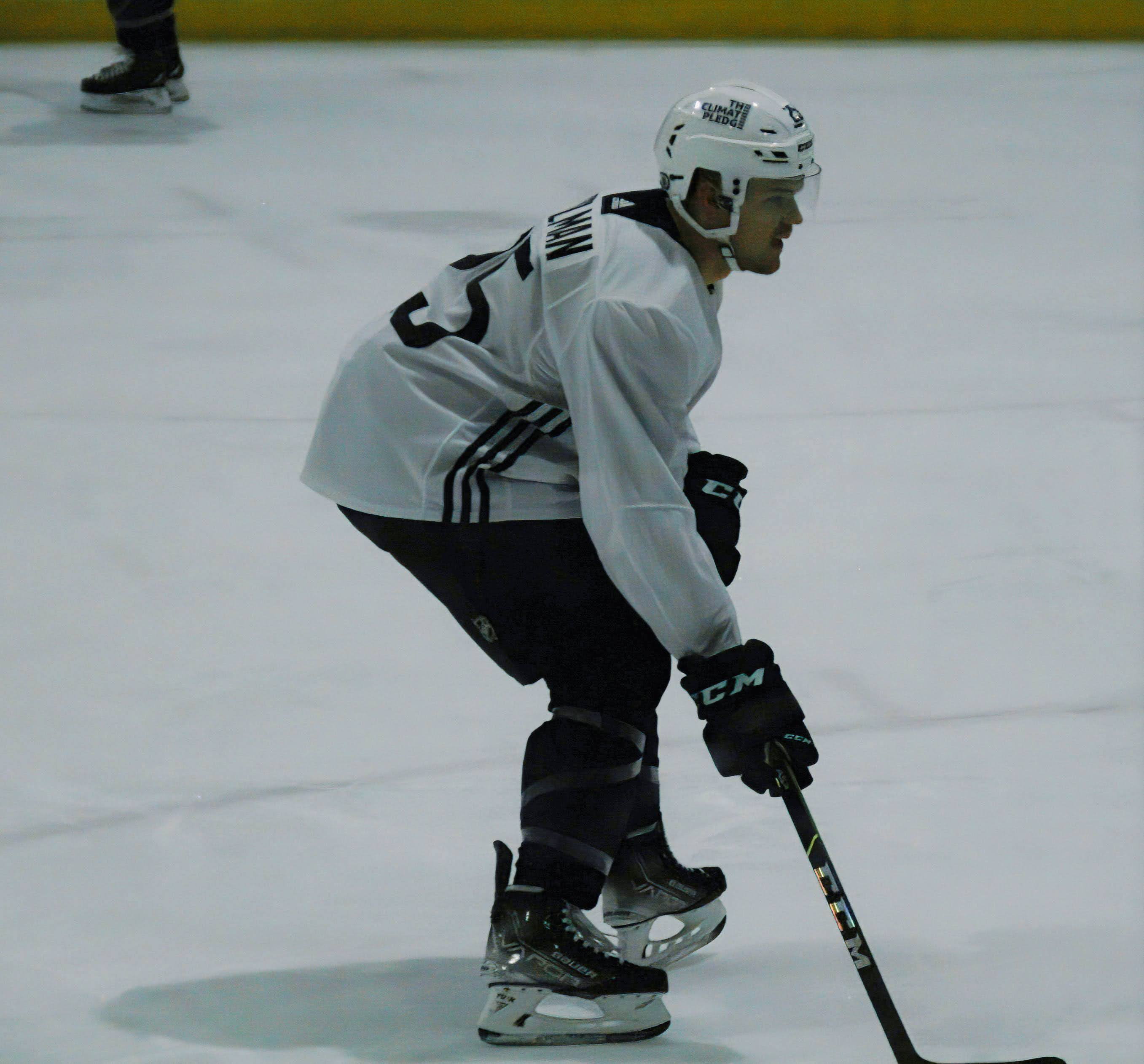
- Kuhlman with the Seattle Kraken in 2022
- Born: September 26, 1995 (age 30) Esko, Minnesota, U.S.
- Height: 5 ft 10 in (178 cm)
- Weight: 189 lb (86 kg; 13 st 7 lb)
- Position: Center
- Shoots: Right
- SHL team Former teams: Rögle BK; Boston Bruins; Seattle Kraken; Winnipeg Jets; Lukko
- National team: United States
- NHL draft: Undrafted
- Playing career: 2018–present

Karson Kuhlman (born September 26, 1995) is an American professional ice hockey center for Rögle BK of the Swedish Hockey League (SHL). He has previously played in the National Hockey League (NHL) with the Boston Bruins, Seattle Kraken and Winnipeg Jets.

== Playing career ==
=== Amateur ===
Kuhlman began his career playing with Cloquet High School in the Minnesota State High School League (USHS) from 2010 to 2013. He was selected in the 2011 United States Hockey League (USHL) Futures Draft 48th overall by the Dubuque Fighting Saints. He made his USHL debut with the Fighting Saints in the 2011–12 season, appearing in five games before splitting the following 2012–13 season between high school hockey and the USHL, joining the Dubuque for the entirety of the playoffs in their eventual Clark Cup championship.

Kuhlman played one full season in 2013–14 with the Dubuque Fighting Saints, where he scored 25 goals and 19 assists for 44 points in 56 appearances, and was selected to play in the USHL All-Star Game. He committed to play collegiate hockey at the University of Minnesota Duluth for the Bulldogs men's ice hockey team in the NCAA's National Collegiate Hockey Conference (NCHC).

In his freshman season with the Bulldogs during the 2014–15 season, Kuhlman scored 8 goals and 10 assists for 18 points as the team earned a bid in the NCAA Tournament. Showing early leadership potential, he served as an alternate captain as a sophomore in the 2015–16 season, scoring 12 goals and 20 points in 40 games.

Kuhlman enjoyed a successful junior campaign in the 2016–17 season, scoring 6 goals and 16 assists for a career-high 22 points in 42 games, as the Bulldogs advanced to the Frozen Four before falling to the University of Denver in the NCAA Championship game. Approaching his final collegiate season, Kuhlman was announced as team captain for the 2017–18 season.

Kuhlman continued to contribute in playing as a two-way forward, collecting 13 goals and 20 points in 44 games. He was named the 2018 NCAA Tournament MVP after leading the Bulldogs with a goal and an assist in the team's 2–1 victory over the University of Notre Dame in the NCAA Championship. He completed his collegiate career ranking seventh all-time in the NCAA with 166 consecutive collegiate games played.

=== Professional ===
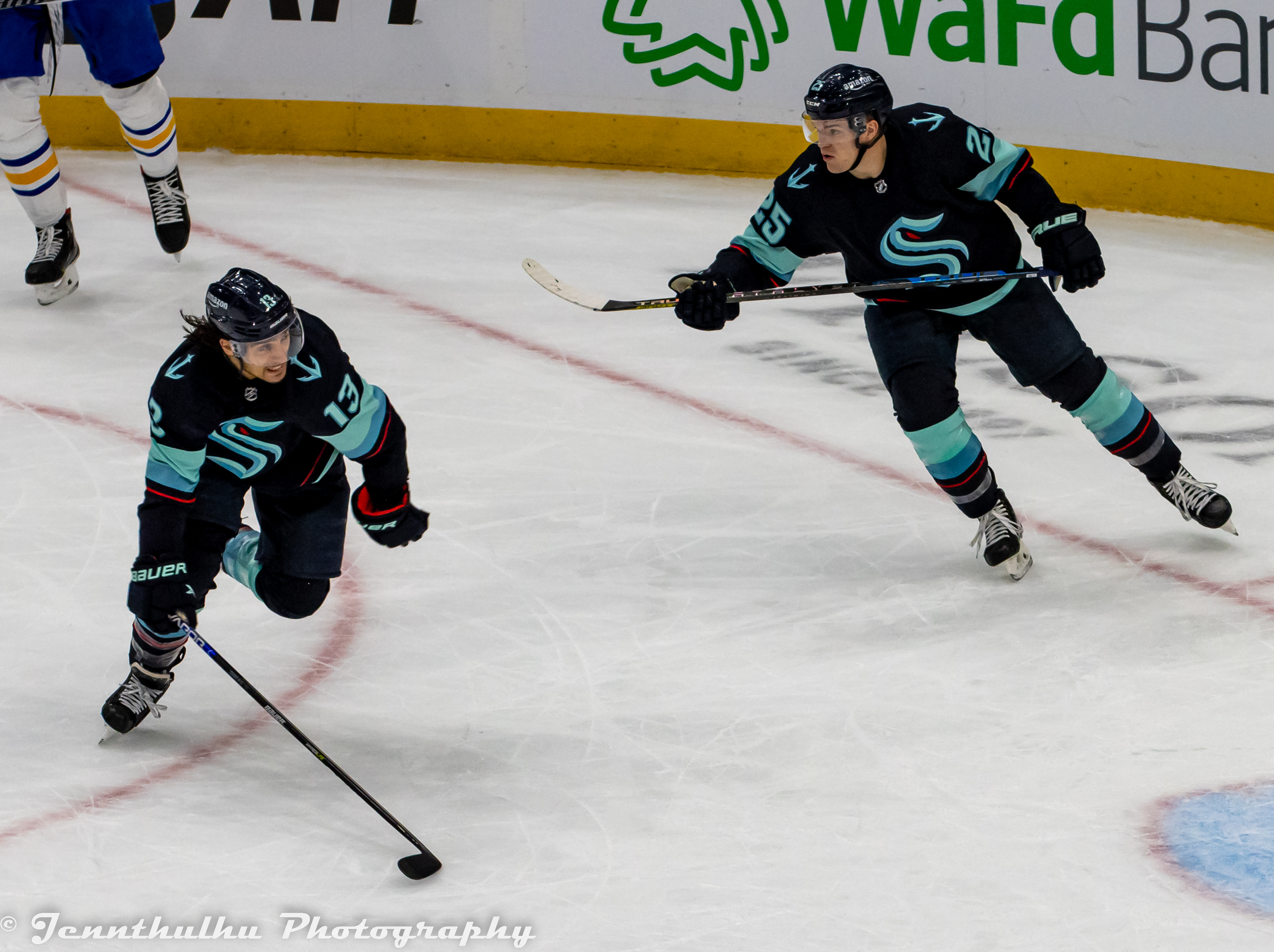
Kuhlman (right) during Seattle Kraken game with Brandon Tanev (left) 2022.

==== Boston Bruins ====
Having been unselected in any 2018 NHL entry draft, and following his championship title with the Bulldogs, Kuhlman signed a two-year, entry-level contract with the Boston Bruins on April 11, 2018. He immediately joined Boston's American Hockey League (AHL) affiliate, the Providence Bruins, on an amateur try-out contract to conclude the 2017–18 season.

After attending the Bruins' training camp ahead of the 2018–19, Kuhlman was assigned to begin the year with Providence. After a slow offensive start to the season, Kuhlman began contributing as a rookie with Providence, scoring 12 goals and 25 points before earning his first call-up to Boston on February 14, 2019, following an injury to David Pastrňák. He made his NHL debut in a 4–2 victory over the Los Angeles Kings at the Staples Center on February 17. He scored his first NHL goal in his second game with the Bruins in a 6–5 overtime victory over the San Jose Sharks on February 19.

On April 15, 2019, Kuhlman recorded his first career Stanley Cup playoff point with an assist on a goal by David Krejčí in a 3–2 loss to the Toronto Maple Leafs. On June 9, he scored his first Stanley Cup playoff goal with a goal against the St. Louis Blues in Game 6 of the Stanley Cup Finals. Kuhlman earned the nod to play in Game 7 of the Finals against the Blues, which the Bruins would lose.

After the heartbreaking loss in the Finals, Kuhlman would earn a spot on the NHL team to start the 2019–20 season. Kuhlman suffered a leg injury early in the season against the Toronto Maple Leafs, and on October 27, 2019, he would be placed on injured reserve. After being activated from IR on December 30, 2019, Kuhlman played in Providence before being called up on January 16, 2020, and scoring two assists in his return. Kuhlman would find consistent playing time in Boston afterwards, until the season was disrupted and postponed due to the COVID-19 pandemic. When the league returned in August, Kuhlman would play in five games, two round-robin, three playoff, and register no points before the Bruins were eliminated in the second round by the Tampa Bay Lightning.

Before the delayed 2020–21 season, Kuhlman signed a two-year extension with the Bruins.

As part of the temporary rules to accommodate the issues that might arise from the pandemic, Kuhlman was on the Bruins' taxi squad, and struggled to find playing time. However, after March, Kuhlman was a consistent fixture in the Bruins' lineup. Despite this, he did find much offensive success, only scoring two goals in 20 games. He would play in three playoff games, scoring an assist before the Bruins were eliminated in the second round by the New York Islanders.

==== Seattle Kraken ====
In the 2021–22 season, in a limited role having registering just one goal and one assist through 19 games, Kuhlman was placed on waivers by the Bruins and on January 18, 2022, Kuhlman was claimed by the Seattle Kraken. He continued with the Kraken for the remainder of the season, collecting 2 goals and 8 points through 25 appearances.

Returning to the Kraken for the 2022–23 season, Kuhlman was reduced to a depth forward role, featuring in just 14 games through the opening months of the campaign, registering a goal and two assists.

==== Winnipeg Jets ====
Kuhlman was placed on waivers by Seattle and he was claimed the following day by the Winnipeg Jets on December 13, 2022. He would continue to serve as a depth forward, scoring two goals and two assists in 33 games with the Jets, and played in a lone playoff game with the team.

==== New York Islanders ====
Kuhlman was signed as a free agent to a one-year, two-way contract with the New York Islanders for the 2023–24 season, on July 5, 2023.

==== Europe ====
Having played six seasons under NHL contract, Kuhlman paused his North American career to sign his first contract abroad. He agreed to a one-year deal with Finnish club, Lukko of the Liiga, on July 20, 2024. In his lone season with Lukko in 2024–25, Kuhlman led the club in scoring by posting 21 goals and 46 points through 60 regular season games. He added just 3 points in 11 playoff appearances before leaving at the conclusion of his contract.

As a free agent, Kuhlman continued his career abroad in signing a one-year contract for the 2025–26 season with Swedish club, Rögle BK of the SHL, on June 9, 2025.

== Career statistics ==
=== Regular season and playoffs ===
| | | | Regular season | | | | | Playoffs |
| Season | Team | League | GP | G | A | Pts | PIM | GP | G | A | Pts | PIM |
|---|---|---|---|---|---|---|---|---|---|---|---|---|
| 2010–11 | Cloquet High | USHS | 25 | 16 | 34 | 50 | 6 | 2 | 1 | 1 | 2 | 2 |
| 2011–12 | Cloquet High | USHS | 25 | 27 | 27 | 54 | 0 | 1 | 0 | 1 | 1 | 0 |
| 2011–12 | Dubuque Fighting Saints | USHL | 5 | 0 | 4 | 4 | 0 | — | — | — | — | — |
| 2012–13 | Cloquet High | USHS | 25 | 25 | 22 | 47 | 6 | 2 | 2 | 2 | 4 | 0 |
| 2012–13 | Dubuque Fighting Saints | USHL | 16 | 1 | 8 | 9 | 0 | 11 | 4 | 2 | 6 | 2 |
| 2013–14 | Dubuque Fighting Saints | USHL | 56 | 25 | 19 | 44 | 12 | 7 | 1 | 2 | 3 | 5 |
| 2014–15 | University of Minnesota Duluth | NCHC | 40 | 8 | 10 | 18 | 8 | — | — | — | — | — |
| 2015–16 | University of Minnesota Duluth | NCHC | 40 | 12 | 8 | 20 | 10 | — | — | — | — | — |
| 2016–17 | University of Minnesota Duluth | NCHC | 42 | 6 | 16 | 22 | 11 | — | — | — | — | — |
| 2017–18 | University of Minnesota Duluth | NCHC | 44 | 13 | 7 | 20 | 18 | — | — | — | — | — |
| 2017–18 | Providence Bruins | AHL | 2 | 0 | 1 | 1 | 2 | 1 | 0 | 1 | 1 | 0 |
| 2018–19 | Providence Bruins | AHL | 58 | 12 | 18 | 30 | 8 | — | — | — | — | — |
| 2018–19 | Boston Bruins | NHL | 11 | 3 | 2 | 5 | 2 | 8 | 1 | 2 | 3 | 0 |
| 2019–20 | Boston Bruins | NHL | 25 | 1 | 5 | 6 | 13 | 5 | 0 | 0 | 0 | 0 |
| 2019–20 | Providence Bruins | AHL | 9 | 4 | 1 | 5 | 0 | — | — | — | — | — |
| 2020–21 | Boston Bruins | NHL | 20 | 2 | 0 | 2 | 0 | 3 | 0 | 1 | 1 | 2 |
| 2020–21 | Providence Bruins | AHL | 5 | 3 | 0 | 3 | 2 | — | — | — | — | — |
| 2021–22 | Boston Bruins | NHL | 19 | 1 | 1 | 2 | 0 | — | — | — | — | — |
| 2021–22 | Seattle Kraken | NHL | 25 | 2 | 6 | 8 | 6 | — | — | — | — | — |
| 2022–23 | Seattle Kraken | NHL | 14 | 1 | 2 | 3 | 0 | — | — | — | — | — |
| 2022–23 | Winnipeg Jets | NHL | 33 | 2 | 2 | 4 | 8 | 1 | 0 | 0 | 0 | 2 |
| 2023–24 | Bridgeport Islanders | AHL | 72 | 12 | 10 | 22 | 14 | — | — | — | — | — |
| 2024–25 | Lukko | Liiga | 60 | 21 | 25 | 46 | 16 | 11 | 1 | 2 | 3 | 2 |
| 2025–26 | Rögle BK | SHL | 52 | 13 | 12 | 25 | 8 | 17 | 3 | 4 | 7 | 0 |
| NHL totals | | | 147 | 12 | 18 | 30 | 29 | 17 | 1 | 3 | 4 | 4 |

=== International ===
| Year | Team | Event | Result | GP | G | A | Pts | PIM |
|---|---|---|---|---|---|---|---|---|
| 2012 | United States | IH18 | 7th | 4 | 0 | 0 | 0 | 0 |
| 2022 | United States | WC | 4th | 10 | 2 | 2 | 4 | 2 |
| Junior totals | | | | 4 | 0 | 0 | 0 | 0 |
| Senior totals | | | | 10 | 2 | 2 | 4 | 2 |

== Awards and honors ==
| Award | Year | Ref |
USHL
| Clark Cup champion | 2013 | |
| All-Star Game | 2014 | |
College
| NCAA champion | 2018 | |
| NCAA All-Tournament Team | 2018 | |
| NCAA Tournament Most Outstanding Player | 2018 | |
| NCHC Sportsmanship Award | 2018 | |

Awards and achievements
| Preceded by Matt Hrynkiw, Tyler Vesel | NCHC Sportsmanship Award; 2017–18 | Succeeded by Patrick Newell |
| Preceded by Jarid Lukosevicius | NCAA Tournament Most Outstanding Player; 2018 | Succeeded by Parker Mackay |
