= Moorhead High School =

Location
- 2300 4th Avenue South; Moorhead, Minnesota 56560; United States; 46.8722222°N 96.7436111°W

Information
- School type: Secondary
- Established: 1883
- School district: Moorhead Area Public Schools
- Principal: Josh Haag
- Teaching staff: 113.33 (FTE)
- Grades: 9–12
- Enrollment: 2,218, 2025–2026 term
- Average class size: 30
- Student to teacher ratio: 17.80
- Colors: Orange and black
- Mascot: Spuddy
- Nickname: Spuds
- Yearbook: Cho Kio
- Website: www.isd152.org/o/mhs

Moorhead High School is a public high school in Moorhead, Minnesota, United States. Established in 1883, the school serves approximately 2,000 students in grades 9–12. The school has a student-teacher ratio of 18.81.

== History ==
The Moorhead School District started in 1872 as a subscription school. This however, was shortly lived as the school closed down in just 2 months. Later that year the school would become housed in a Presbyterian Church and changed into a 5-month permanent school.

On April 15, 1873, James H Sharp organized the first school board and school district. He served on the board of education and was largely remembered as the Father of Moorhead Area Public Schools.

In 1883 Mathias Forsberg became the first graduate of Moorhead High School.

In 1894 the school was rebuilt and served the students until 1921.

In 1921 the school was torn down and replaced with a new building on the townsite center. This building was used until 1967 when the current High School building was built.

In 2019 Moorhead voters passed a 110 million bond referendum to reconstruct the high school. Beginning in summer of 2021, Moorhead started construction on the building. They planned on adding 3 new academic wings, a new sports center, and a new music wing. Construction is projected to finish during the 2024–2025 school year.

In 2020 Moorhead purchased the old Sams Club building and renovated into a second campus for learning. In fall of 2021 the building opened for students. Offering a range of career related courses designed to prepare students for a job.

As of 2026, the music wing that has been in construction ever since 2025 has been finished.

== Extracurricular activities ==
Student groups and activities at Moorhead High School include Destination Imagination, Apollo Strings, Business Professionals of America, Carolers, Drama, Key Club, Knowledge Bowl, MHS Journalism Club, Newspaper, Pep Band, Science Olympiad, Speech, Debate, Student Council, and Yearbook.

=== Athletics ===
The school's athletic teams, known as the Moorhead Spuds, compete in adapted hockey, baseball, basketball, cross country, dance team, football, golf, gymnastics, hockey, lacrosse, soccer, softball, cross country skiing, swimming and diving, tennis, track and field, volleyball, and wrestling.

State championship titles held by the school include:

- Basketball, boys': 1928, 1929
- Football: 1971, 1987 (AA)
- Golf, boys: 2012 (AAA), 2015 (AAA)
- Track and field, boys': 1929, 1967, 1968, 1972, 1973 (AA), 1987 (AA), 1993 (AA)
- Track and field, girls': 1973, 1974, 1975, 1999 (AA), 2001 (AA)
- Volleyball: 1988 (AA)
- Speech: 2016, 2017, 2018, 2019, 2021, 2022, 2023 (AA)
- Hockey, boys': 2025, 2026 (AA)

== Notable alumni ==
- Jason Blake, professional ice hockey player
- Will Borgen, professional ice hockey player
- Ada Comstock, women's education pioneer
- Brian Coyle, three-term Minneapolis City Council member
- Mark Cullen, professional ice hockey player
- Matt Cullen, professional ice hockey player, three-time Stanley Cup champion
- Becky Gulsvig, actress
- Sydney Johnson, basketball coach, Princeton, Fairfield University
- Mark Ladwig, member of 2010 U.S. Olympic team-figure skating
- Morrie Lanning, member of the Minnesota House of Representatives
- Ben Lien, member of the Minnesota House of Representatives
- Brian Lee, professional ice hockey player
- Warren Magnuson, US Senator from Washington 1944–1981
- Olaus Murie, naturalist
- Arlan Stangeland, member of the United States House of Representatives 1977–1991
- Chris VandeVelde, professional ice hockey player
