= NCHC Sportsmanship Award =

- Sport: College ice hockey
- League: NCHC
- Awarded for: The player best exemplifying the qualities of sportsmanship in the NCHC

History
- First award: 2014
- Most recent: Blake Mesenburg

The NCHC Sportsmanship Award is an annual award given out at the conclusion of the National Collegiate Hockey Conference regular season to the best player best exemplifying the qualities of sportsmanship in the conference as voted by the coaches of each NCHC team.

The Sportsmanship Award was first awarded in 2014 and is a successor to the Terry Flanagan Memorial Award which was discontinued after the first iteration of the CCHA dissolved due to the 2013–14 NCAA conference realignment.

== Award winners ==
Year	Winner	Position	School
2013–14	Eamonn McDermott	Defenceman	Colorado College
2014–15	Nick Oliver	Forward	St. Cloud State
2015–16	Cal Decowski	Forward	Minnesota Duluth
2016–17	Matt Hrynkiw	Goaltender	North Dakota
2016–17	Tyler Vesel	Forward	Omaha
2017–18	Karson Kuhlman	Forward	Minnesota Duluth
2018–19	Patrick Newell	Forward	St. Cloud State
2019–20	Kobe Roth	Forward	Minnesota Duluth
2020–21	Kevin Fitzgerald	Center	St. Cloud State
2021–22	Mark Senden	Forward	North Dakota
2022–23	Spencer Meier	Defenseman	St. Cloud State
2023–24	Darian Gotz	Defenseman	Minnesota Duluth
2024–25	Joe Molenaar	Forward	Minnesota Duluth
2025–26	Blake Mesenburg	Forward	Miami

=== Winners by school ===
School	Winners
Minnesota Duluth	5
St. Cloud State	4
North Dakota	2
Colorado College	1
Miami	1
Omaha	1

=== Winners by position ===
Position	Winners
Forward	9
Defenceman	3
Center	1
Goaltender	1

== See also ==
- NCHC Awards
- Terry Flanagan Memorial Award
