= NCHC Defensive Defenseman of the Year =

- Sport: College ice hockey
- League: NCHC

History
- First award: 2014 (Defenseman of the Year); 2017 (Defensive Defenseman of the Year)
- Most wins: Joey LaLeggia (2)
- Most recent: Adam Kleber

The NCHC Defensive Defenseman of the Year is an annual award given out at the conclusion of the National Collegiate Hockey Conference regular season to the best defensive defenseman in the conference as voted by the coaches of each NCHC team.

The Defenseman of the Year was first awarded in 2014 and is a successor to the CCHA Best Defensive Defenseman which was temporarily discontinued after the first iteration of the conference dissolved due to the 2013–14 NCAA conference realignment.

Prior to the 2016–17 season the Defensive Defenseman of the Year was known as the NCHC Defenseman of the Year.

== Defenseman of the Year Award winners ==
Year	Winner	School
2013–14	Joey LaLeggia	Denver
2014–15	Joey LaLeggia	Denver
2015–16	Ethan Prow	St. Cloud State

=== Winners by school ===
School	Winners
Denver	2
St. Cloud State	1

== Defensive Defenseman of the Year Award Winners ==
Year	Winner	School
2016–17	Tucker Poolman	North Dakota
2017–18	Will Borgen	St. Cloud State
2018–19	Jimmy Schuldt	St. Cloud State
2019–20	Colton Poolman	North Dakota
2020–21	Jacob Bernard-Docker	North Dakota
2021–22	Ethan Frisch	North Dakota
2022–23	Justin Lee	Denver
2023–24	Sean Behrens	Denver
2024–25	Ty Murchison	Arizona State
2025–26	Adam Kleber	Minnesota Duluth

=== Winners by school ===
School	Winners
North Dakota	4
St. Cloud State	2
Denver	2
Arizona State	1
Minnesota Duluth	1

== See also ==
- NCHC Awards
- CCHA Best Defensive Defenseman
