= Jimmy Schuldt =

American ice hockey player (born 1995)

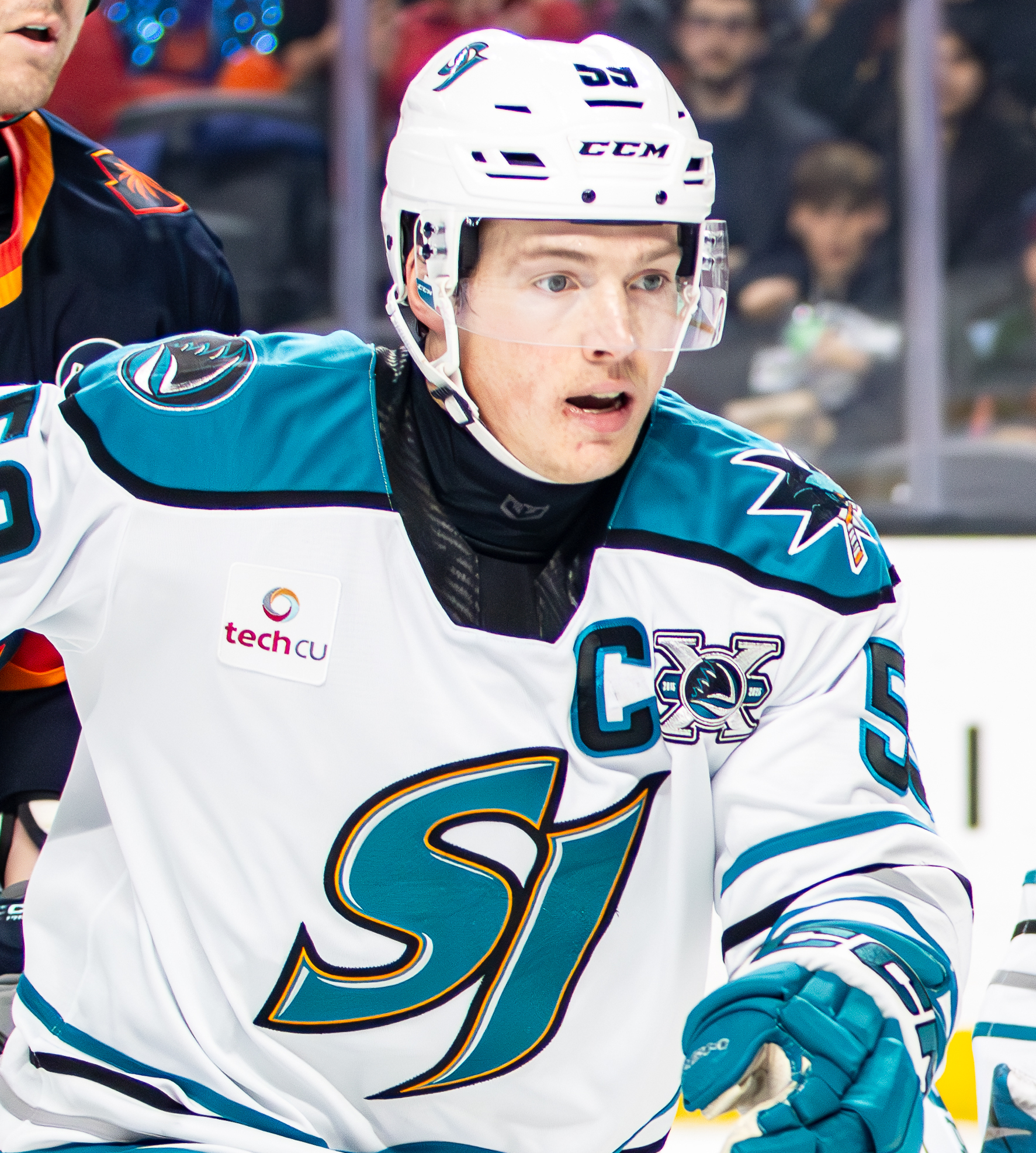
- Schuldt with the San Jose Barracuda in 2025
- Born: May 11, 1995 (age 31) Minnetonka, Minnesota, U.S.
- Height: 6 ft 1 in (185 cm)
- Weight: 205 lb (93 kg; 14 st 9 lb)
- Position: Defense
- Shoots: Left
- NHL team (P) Cur. team Former teams: Vancouver Canucks; Abbotsford Canucks (AHL); Vegas Golden Knights; San Jose Sharks
- NHL draft: Undrafted
- Playing career: 2019–present

James Schuldt (born May 11, 1995) is an American professional ice hockey defenseman for the Abbotsford Canucks in the American Hockey League (AHL) while under contract to the Vancouver Canucks in the National Hockey League (NHL). He has previously played with the Vegas Golden Knights and San Jose Sharks.

== Early life ==
Schuldt was born on May 11, 1995, to parents Steve and Sheri Schuldt in Minnetonka, Minnesota. Both of his parents were involved in sports growing up; his father played offensive line for the St. Cloud State football team while his mother was recruited to St. Cloud State to play softball.

== Playing career ==
Schuldt played junior hockey for three seasons with the Omaha Lancers of the United States Hockey League (USHL) before going on to play collegiate hockey at St. Cloud State University. He captained the Huskies during his last three seasons there. Schuldt was a Hobey Baker Award finalist and All-NCHC First Team two times at St. Cloud State and during his senior season, he was also named NCHC Player of the Year and NCHC Defensive Defenseman of the Year. On March 12, Schuldt was named to the AHCA First-Team All-American.

On April 3, 2019, Schuldt signed a one-year entry-level contract with the Vegas Golden Knights. He made his debut on April 6, 2019, against the Los Angeles Kings.

As a free agent from the Golden Knights, Schuldt agreed to a one-year, two-way contract with the Buffalo Sabres on July 28, 2021. In the following 2021–22 season, Schuldt played exclusively with the Sabres AHL affiliate, the Rochester Americans, appearing in a professional high 61 regular season games from the blueline in contributing with 5 goals and 17 points.

Schuldt continued his career in the AHL signing a one-year AHL contract with the Coachella Valley Firebirds, affiliate to the Seattle Kraken, for their inaugural 2022–23 season, on September 22, 2022.

Following a successful debut season with the Firebirds, Schuldt earned a one-year, two-way contract with NHL affiliate, the Seattle Kraken, for the 2023–24 season on July 1, 2023. In his lone season under contract with the Kraken, Schuldt continued to play exclusively in the AHL with the Firebirds. He posted 5 goals and 24 points through 68 regular season games, helping the Firebirds advance to the Calder Cup finals for a second consecutive season.

As a free agent from the Kraken, Schuldt was signed to a one-year, two-way contract with the San Jose Sharks on July 1, 2024. He played 8 games with the Sharks, registering no points, while scoring 21 points (6 goals, 15 assists) with their minor league affiliate, the San Jose Barracuda.

As a free agent from the Sharks, Schuldt was signed to a two-year, two-way contract with the Vancouver Canucks on July 1, 2025.

== Career statistics ==
			Regular season					Playoffs
Season	Team	League	GP	G	A	Pts	PIM	GP	G	A	Pts	PIM
2012–13	Omaha Lancers	USHL	6	0	2	2	5	—	—	—	—	—
2013–14	Omaha Lancers	USHL	57	6	19	25	99	4	1	0	1	2
2014–15	Omaha Lancers	USHL	59	13	26	39	48	3	1	1	2	0
2015–16	St. Cloud State	NCHC	41	10	16	26	24	—	—	—	—	—
2016–17	St. Cloud State	NCHC	36	8	11	19	28	—	—	—	—	—
2017–18	St. Cloud State	NCHC	40	10	28	38	36	—	—	—	—	—
2018–19	St. Cloud State	NCHC	39	10	25	35	18	—	—	—	—	—
2018–19	Vegas Golden Knights	NHL	1	0	1	1	0	—	—	—	—	—
2019–20	Chicago Wolves	AHL	52	6	15	21	42	—	—	—	—	—
2020–21	Henderson Silver Knights	AHL	38	6	8	14	15	5	0	0	0	2
2021–22	Rochester Americans	AHL	61	5	12	17	58	10	1	3	4	4
2022–23	Coachella Valley Firebirds	AHL	71	8	24	32	31	26	5	4	9	10
2023–24	Coachella Valley Firebirds	AHL	68	5	10	24	42	18	3	3	6	0
2024–25	San Jose Barracuda	AHL	64	6	15	21	34	6	0	0	0	0
2024–25	San Jose Sharks	NHL	8	0	0	0	0	—	—	—	—	—
2025–26	Abbotsford Canucks	AHL	70	3	15	18	59	—	—	—	—	—
NHL totals			9	0	1	1	0	—	—	—	—	—

== Awards and honors ==
Award	Year
College
NCHC Rookie Team	2016
NCHC First Team	2018, 2019
NCHC Player of the Year	2019
NCHC Defensive Defenseman of the Year	2019
AHCA First-Team All-American	2019

Awards and achievements
Preceded by Henrik Borgström	NCHC Player of the Year; 2018–19	Succeeded by Scott Perunovich
Preceded by Will Borgen	NCHC Defensive Defenseman of the Year; 2018–19	Succeeded by Colton Poolman
