= 2018–19 Minnesota Duluth Bulldogs men's ice hockey season =

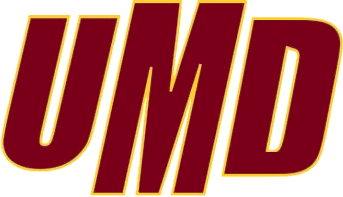

NCAA Division I National Champion NCHC Tournament, Champion NCAA Tournament, Champion
- Conference: 2nd NCHC
- Home ice: AMSOIL Arena

Rankings
- USCHO: #1
- USA Today: #1

Record
- Overall: 29–11–2
- Conference: 14–9–1
- Home: 13–3–1
- Road: 9–7–1
- Neutral: 7–1–0

Coaches and captains
- Head coach: Scott Sandelin
- Assistant coaches: Jason Herter; Adam Krause; Brant Nicklin
- Captain: Parker Mackay
- Alternate captain: Billy Excell

The 2018–19 Minnesota Duluth Bulldogs men's ice hockey season was the 75th season of play for the program and the 7th in the NCHC conference. The Bulldogs represented the University of Minnesota Duluth and were coached by Scott Sandelin, in his 19th season.

== Season ==
Coming off of the program's second national championship, Duluth was ranked #1 in the preseason polls. With most of their principle scorers and virtually the entire defensive corps returning, the team was in a tremendous position to repeat. Leading the way, however, was the Bulldogs' star goaltender Hunter Shepard, who would live up to his billing as one of if not the best goaltender in the nation.

Duluth stumbled out of the gate, losing a weekend to old rival Minnesota, but then reeled off eight consecutive victories, including a sweep of then #1 Notre Dame, to reclaim their top position. The Bulldogs went through a bit of a rough patch in the middle of the season, going more than two months (including the winter break) without sweeping a weekend. The up and down play dropped them to #5 in the polls but the Bulldogs were never really in jeopardy of missing out on the NCAA tournament. UMD ended the regular season with a showdown between two of the top teams in the nation when they met St. Cloud State. While they dropped both games, Duluth lost by just a single goal on each occasion and pushed one of the contests into overtime.

The Bulldogs opened their postseason with a relatively easy opponent in Omaha but still struggled in the two games. Duluth had been a defensive powerhouse all season long but their offense was rather pedestrian. With UMD going 1-for-10 on the power play and needing overtime to finish off a team that was 13 games under .500, there was little doubt that it would be up to Shepard and the defense to carry them through the rest of the playoffs.

Luckily, the Bulldogs were already battle-tested and stood strong in the Frozen Faceoff. Shepard posted his 6th shutout of the season against Denver to set up a showdown for conference bragging right with St. Cloud State. After exchanging goals in the first, the match turned into a defensive struggle but the Huskies pulled ahead at the beginning of the third period. After failing to capitalize on their third man-advantage of the game, Duluth was forced to kill off a tripping penalty with just over 6 minutes remaining. The Bulldogs could not afford to fall down by two with their offensive struggles and rallied to keep the puck out of the net. In a dramatic turn of events, St. Cloud coughed up the puck in their own during the power play and could only watch as Tanner Laderoute found a wide-open Billy Exell in the slot who tied the game on only his second goal of the season. The goaltending duel resumed afterwards and remained in place for the rest of the game. Near the mid-way point of the second overtime, Nick Swaney ended the game in dramatic fashion and gave Duluth the conference championship.

While St. Cloud State remained as the #1 team in spite of the loss, Duluth was able to rise up to #2 after winning the NCHC title. The Bulldogs travelled to Allentown for the midwest regional and faced #15 Bowling Green in their opening game, a rematch of the 1984 championship game. Despite being heavily favored in the match, Duluth's offense was lacking and UMD entered the third period down 0–1. After coming up empty on their fourth power play opportunity of the game and will less than 5 minutes remaining in the contest it appeared that UMD's luck was about to run out. Fortunately for the Bulldogs, Parker Mackay had other ideas. Mackay finally beat Ryan Bednard for Duluth's first goal of the game with just 3:01 left in regulation. Mackay then ended the game in overtime with his 14th of the season and allow Minnesota Duluth to survive and advance.

Duluth appeared to relax after the first victory in the tournament and strangled the offenses of their succeeding opponents. In the next game, Quinnipiac managed their only goal of the game after pulling their goaltender while on the power play. However, an empty-net goal from Parker Mackay shortly afterwards ended the Bobcats' comeback attempt. The national semifinal too saw UMD surrendering one power play marker but Billy Excell's third goal of the season proved to be the game-winner over Providence.

The championship game pitted Duluth against Massachusetts, who possessed the #2 offense in the nation as well as the Hobey Baker Award winner, Cale Makar. Duluth was undaunted and constrained the Minutemen for the entire match. The Bulldog defense snuffed out every attempt on goal and limited UMass to just 18 shots for the game. In the meantime, Parker Mackay opened the scoring on the man-advantage, scoring the first power play goal for Duluth in 7 games. After ending the 0-for-16 streak just 4 minutes into the match, Duluth played like they knew they were going to win the game. The Bulldogs scored once in each period but completely dominated the contest. There was very little drama in the game but that didn't dampen the team's celebration in the slightest and UMD became the first team in 14 years to repeat as national champions.

== Departures ==
Player	Position	Nationality	Cause
Joey Anderson	Forward	United States	Signed professional contract (New Jersey Devils)
Karson Kuhlman	Forward	United States	Graduation (signed with Boston Bruins)
Nick McCormack	Defenseman	United States	Graduation (retired)
Avery Peterson	Forward	United States	Graduation (signed with Idaho Steelheads)
Sammy Spurrell	Forward	Canada	Graduation (retired)
Jared Thomas	Forward	United States	Graduation (signed with San Antonio Rampage)
Blake Young	Forward	Canada	Graduation (signed with Diables Rouges de Briançon)

== Recruiting ==
Player	Position	Nationality	Age	Notes
Jackson Cates	Forward	United States	21	Stillwater, MN
Noah Cates	Forward	United States	19	Stillwater, MN; selected 137th overall in 2017
Jesse Jacques	Forward	United States	20	Duluth, MN
Cole Koepke	Forward	United States	20	Hermantown, MN; selected 183rd overall in 2018
Tanner Laderoute	Forward	Canada	21	Three Hills, AB
Hunter Lellig	Defenseman	United States	19	Waterloo, IA
Jake Rosenbaum	Defenseman	United States	21	Laguna Niguel, CA

== Roster ==
As of September 8, 2019.

No.	Nat.	Player	Class	Pos	Height	Weight	DoB	Hometown	Previous team	NHL rights
3	(United States)	Matt Anderson	Sophomore	D	6' 0" (1.83 m)	195 lb (88 kg)	1999-04-11	Shakopee, Minnesota	Holy Family High School (USHS–MN)	—
4	(United States)	Dylan Samberg	Sophomore	D	6' 4" (1.93 m)	215 lb (98 kg)	1999-01-24	Hermantown, Minnesota	Hermantown High School (USHS–MN)	WPG, 43rd overall 2017
5	(United States)	Nick Wolff	Junior	D	6' 5" (1.96 m)	230 lb (104 kg)	1996-07-21	Eagan, Minnesota	Des Moines Buccaneers (USHL)	—
6	(United States)	Louie Roehl	Sophomore	D	5' 10" (1.78 m)	185 lb (84 kg)	1998-04-09	Eden Prairie, Minnesota	Minnesota Wilderness (NAHL)	—
7	(United States)	Scott Perunovich	Sophomore	D	5' 10" (1.78 m)	175 lb (79 kg)	1998-08-18	Hibbing, Minnesota	Cedar Rapids RoughRiders (USHL)	STL, 45th overall 2018
8	(United States)	Hunter Lellig	Freshman	D	6' 2" (1.88 m)	185 lb (84 kg)	1999-02-08	Waterloo, Iowa	Waterloo Black Hawks (USHL)	—
10	(United States)	Kobe Roth	Sophomore	F	5' 9" (1.75 m)	175 lb (79 kg)	1997-01-11	Warroad, Minnesota	Des Moines Buccaneers (USHL)	—
11	(United States)	Koby Bender	Sophomore	F	6' 1" (1.85 m)	200 lb (91 kg)	1997-07-15	Cloquet, Minnesota	Muskegon Lumberjacks (USHL)	—
12	(Canada)	Jarod Hilderman	Sophomore	D	6' 1" (1.85 m)	210 lb (95 kg)	1997-04-11	Kamsack, Saskatchewan	Fargo Force (USHL)	—
13	(Canada)	Tanner Laderoute	Freshman	F	6' 0" (1.83 m)	190 lb (86 kg)	1997-06-04	Edmonton, Alberta	Okotoks Oilers (AJHL)	—
16	(Canada)	Billy Excell (A)	Senior	F	5' 11" (1.8 m)	174 lb (79 kg)	1995-10-04	Thunder Bay, Ontario	Minnesota Wilderness (NAHL)	—
17	(United States)	Cole Koepke	Freshman	F	6' 1" (1.85 m)	195 lb (88 kg)	1998-05-17	Hermantown, Minnesota	Sioux City Musketeers (USHL)	TBL, 183rd overall 2018
18	(United States)	Jesse Jacques	Freshman	F	6' 1" (1.85 m)	195 lb (88 kg)	1998-09-10	Hermantown, Minnesota	Green Bay Gamblers (USHL)	—
19	(United States)	Justin Richards	Sophomore	F	5' 11" (1.8 m)	190 lb (86 kg)	1998-03-17	Columbus, Ohio	Lincoln Stars (USHL)	—
20	(United States)	Jackson Cates	Freshman	F	6' 0" (1.83 m)	190 lb (86 kg)	1997-09-28	Stillwater, Minnesota	Waterloo Black Hawks (USHL)	—
21	(United States)	Noah Cates	Freshman	F	6' 2" (1.88 m)	190 lb (86 kg)	1999-02-05	Stillwater, Minnesota	Omaha Lancers (USHL)	PHI, 137th overall 2017
23	(United States)	Nick Swaney	Sophomore	F	5' 11" (1.8 m)	175 lb (79 kg)	1997-09-09	Lakeville, Minnesota	Waterloo Black Hawks (USHL)	MIN, 209th overall 2017
24	(United States)	Mikey Anderson	Sophomore	D	6' 0" (1.83 m)	196 lb (89 kg)	1999-05-25	Fridley, Minnesota	Waterloo Black Hawks (USHL)	LAK, 103rd overall 2017
25	(United States)	Peter Krieger	Senior	F	6' 0" (1.83 m)	194 lb (88 kg)	1993-12-09	Oakdale, Minnesota	Alaska (WCHA)	—
26	(United States)	Jade Miller	Junior	F	5' 10" (1.78 m)	190 lb (86 kg)	1995-07-01	Minto, North Dakota	Austin Bruins (NAHL)	—
27	(United States)	Riley Tufte	Freshman	D	6' 0" (1.83 m)	190 lb (86 kg)	1997-03-28	Trabuco Canyon, California	Minot Minotauros (NAHL)	—
28	(United States)	Jake Rosenbaum	Freshman	D	6' 0" (1.83 m)	190 lb (86 kg)	1997-03-28	Trabuco Canyon, California	Minot Minotauros (NAHL)	—
32	(United States)	Hunter Shepard	Junior	G	6' 1" (1.85 m)	210 lb (95 kg)	1995-11-07	Cohasset, Minnesota	Bismarck Bobcats (NAHL)	—
36	(Canada)	Ben Patt	Freshman (RS)	G	5' 11" (1.8 m)	180 lb (82 kg)	1996-05-19	Brampton, Ontario	Notre Dame Hounds (SJHL)	—
37	(United States)	Nick Deery	Senior	G	6' 1" (1.85 m)	185 lb (84 kg)	1994-05-25	La Crosse, Wisconsin	Steinbach Pistons (MJHL)	—
39	(Canada)	Parker Mackay (C)	Senior	F	5' 11" (1.8 m)	180 lb (82 kg)	1994-06-10	Irma, Alberta	Spruce Grove Saints (AJHL)	—

== Standings ==
2018–19 National Collegiate Hockey Conference Standings
	Conference record								Overall record					
	GP	W	L	T	3/SW	PTS	GF	GA	GP	W	L	T	GF	GA
#5 St. Cloud State †	24	19	2	3	2	62	94	52	39	30	6	3	156	85
#1 Minnesota Duluth *	24	14	9	1	0	43	75	48	42	29	11	2	133	79
#18 Western Michigan	24	13	10	1	1	41	79	78	37	21	15	1	129	115
#3 Denver	24	11	10	3	3	39	55	56	41	24	12	5	116	83
#20 North Dakota	24	12	11	1	0	37	56	55	37	18	17	2	93	90
Colorado College	24	9	12	3	0	30	66	66	41	17	20	4	117	114
Omaha	24	5	17	2	1	18	53	86	36	9	24	3	90	132
Miami	24	5	17	2	1	18	49	86	38	11	23	4	87	122
Championship: March 23, 2019 † indicates conference regular season champion (Penrose Cup) * indicates conference tournament champion Rankings: USCHO.com Top 20 Poll

== Schedule and results ==
Date	Time	Opponent^{#}	Rank^{#}	Site	TV	Decision	Result	Attendance	Record
Regular Season
October 6	7:07 pm	#13 Minnesota*	#1	AMSOIL Arena • Duluth, Minnesota (Rivalry)		Shepard	T 1–1 ^{OT}	7,362	0–0–1
October 7	7:05 pm	at #13 Minnesota*	#1	3M Arena at Mariucci • Minneapolis, Minnesota (Rivalry)	FSN	Shepard	L 4–7	9,409	0–1–1
October 12	6:37 pm	at #19 Michigan Tech*	#3	MacInnes Student Ice Arena • Houghton, Michigan		Shepard	W 2–1	3,432	1–1–1
October 13	6:07 pm	at #19 Michigan Tech*	#3	MacInnes Student Ice Arena • Houghton, Michigan		Shepard	W 5–2	3,100	2–1–1
October 19	7:07 pm	Maine*	#3	AMSOIL Arena • Duluth, Minnesota		Shepard	W 8–2	5,902	3–1–1
October 20	7:07 pm	Maine*	#3	AMSOIL Arena • Duluth, Minnesota		Shepard	W 3–2	6,589	4–1–1
October 26	6:10 pm	at #1 Notre Dame*	#3	Compton Family Ice Arena • Notre Dame, Indiana	NBCSN	Shepard	W 3–2	4,569	5–1–1
October 27	4:05 pm	at #1 Notre Dame*	#3	Compton Family Ice Arena • Notre Dame, Indiana		Shepard	W 3–1	4,416	6–1–1
November 9	7:07 pm	Colorado College	#1	AMSOIL Arena • Duluth, Minnesota		Shepard	W 3–0	5,499	7–1–1 (1–0–0)
November 10	7:07 pm	Colorado College	#1	AMSOIL Arena • Duluth, Minnesota	Altitude	Shepard	W 5–1	5,903	8–1–1 (2–0–0)
November 16	8:05 pm	at #7 Denver	#1	Magness Arena • Denver, Colorado	Altitude 2	Shepard	L 0–2	5,117	8–2–1 (2–1–0)
November 17	7:05 pm	at #7 Denver	#1	Magness Arena • Denver, Colorado	Altitude 2	Shepard	W 4–3 ^{OT}	5,808	9–2–1 (3–1–0)
November 30	7:07 pm	#15 North Dakota	#2	AMSOIL Arena • Duluth, Minnesota	FSN+, Midco	Shepard	W 5–0	6,787	10–2–1 (4–1–0)
December 1	7:07 pm	#15 North Dakota	#2	AMSOIL Arena • Duluth, Minnesota	My9, Midco	Shepard	L 1–2	6,880	10–3–1 (4–2–0)
December 7	6:07 pm	at Western Michigan	#4	Lawson Arena • Kalamazoo, Michigan		Shepard	L 2–3	2,709	10–4–1 (4–3–0)
December 8	6:05 pm	at Western Michigan	#4	Lawson Arena • Kalamazoo, Michigan		Shepard	T 1–1 ^{SOL}	3,123	10–4–2 (4–3–1)
Desert Hockey Classic
December 28	5:30 pm	vs. #3 Minnesota State*	#4	Gila River Arena • Glendale, Arizona (Desert Hockey Classic Semifinal)		Shepard	W 4–3 ^{OT}	4,062	11–4–2
December 29	5:30 pm	vs. #19 Clarkson*	#4	Gila River Arena • Glendale, Arizona (Desert Hockey Classic Championship)		Shepard	L 1–3	3,341	11–5–2
January 5	7:07 pm	USNTDP*	#4	AMSOIL Arena • Duluth, Minnesota (Exhibition)		Deery	L 2–4	4,802	
January 11	7:07 pm	#2 St. Cloud State	#5	AMSOIL Arena • Duluth, Minnesota		Shepard	W 3–1	6,370	12–5–2 (5–3–1)
January 12	7:07 pm	#2 St. Cloud State	#5	AMSOIL Arena • Duluth, Minnesota		Shepard	L 2–4	6,647	12–6–2 (5–4–1)
January 18	6:35 pm	at Miami	#5	Steve Cady Arena • Oxford, Ohio		Shepard	W 4–0	2,029	13–6–2 (6–4–1)
January 19	6:05 pm	at Miami	#5	Steve Cady Arena • Oxford, Ohio		Shepard	W 3–0	2,018	14–6–2 (7–4–1)
January 25	7:07 pm	Omaha	#5	AMSOIL Arena • Duluth, Minnesota		Shepard	W 7–2	5,268	15–6–2 (8–4–1)
January 26	7:07 pm	Omaha	#5	AMSOIL Arena • Duluth, Minnesota	FSN+	Shepard	W 3–1	6,134	16–6–2 (9–4–1)
February 1	8:37 pm	at Colorado College	#3	Broadmoor World Arena • Colorado Springs, Colorado		Shepard	L 1–4	3,609	16–7–2 (9–5–1)
February 2	7:07 pm	at Colorado College	#3	Broadmoor World Arena • Colorado Springs, Colorado		Shepard	W 6–0	4,391	17–7–2 (10–5–1)
February 15	8:07 pm	#7 Denver	#4	AMSOIL Arena • Duluth, Minnesota	CBS Sports	Shepard	W 5–2	5,720	18–7–2 (11–5–1)
February 16	7:07 pm	#7 Denver	#4	AMSOIL Arena • Duluth, Minnesota	My9	Shepard	L 0–1	6,462	18–8–2 (11–6–1)
February 22	7:38 pm	at North Dakota	#3	Ralph Engelstad Arena • Grand Forks, North Dakota	CBS Sports	Shepard	L 1–4	11,605	18–9–2 (11–7–1)
February 23	7:07 pm	at North Dakota	#3	Ralph Engelstad Arena • Grand Forks, North Dakota	Midco	Shepard	W 3–2	11,990	19–9–2 (12–7–1)
March 1	7:07 pm	Miami	#3	AMSOIL Arena • Duluth, Minnesota	FSN+	Shepard	W 4–2	5,634	20–9–2 (13–7–1)
March 2	7:07 pm	Miami	#3	AMSOIL Arena • Duluth, Minnesota		Shepard	W 6–5	6,662	21–9–2 (14–7–1)
March 8	7:42 pm	at #1 St. Cloud State	#3	Herb Brooks National Hockey Center • St. Cloud, Minnesota	CBS Sports	Shepard	L 3–4 ^{OT}	5,135	21–10–2 (14–8–1)
March 9	4:07 pm	at #1 St. Cloud State	#3	Herb Brooks National Hockey Center • St. Cloud, Minnesota	FSN+	Shepard	L 3–4	5,550	21–11–2 (14–9–1)
NCHC Tournament
March 15	4:07 pm	Omaha	#4	AMSOIL Arena • Duluth, Minnesota (NCHC Quarterfinal Game 1)		Shepard	W 2–1 ^{OT}	5,550	22–11–2
March 16	7:07 pm	Omaha	#4	AMSOIL Arena • Duluth, Minnesota (NCHC Quarterfinal Game 2)		Shepard	W 4–1	4,318	23–11–2
March 22	7:38 pm	vs. #5 Denver	#4	Xcel Energy Center • Saint Paul, Minnesota (NCHC Semifinal)	CBS Sports	Shepard	W 3–0	9,517	24–11–2
March 22	7:07 pm	vs. #1 St. Cloud State	#4	Xcel Energy Center • Saint Paul, Minnesota (NCHC Championship)	CBS Sports	Shepard	W 3–2 ^{2OT}	10,621	25–11–2
NCAA Tournament
March 30	3:00 pm	vs. #15 Bowling Green	#2	PPL Center • Allentown, Pennsylvania (Midwest Regional Semifinal)	ESPNU	Shepard	W 2–1 ^{OT}	3,763	26–11–2
March 31	5:33 pm	vs. #8 Quinnipiac	#2	PPL Center • Allentown, Pennsylvania (Midwest Regional Final)	ESPNU	Shepard	W 3–1	3,561	27–11–2
April 11	4:00 pm	vs. #11 Providence	#2	Key Bank Center • Buffalo, New York (National Semifinal)	ESPN2	Shepard	W 4–1	13,051	28–11–2
April 13	7:10 pm	vs. #4 Massachusetts	#2	Key Bank Center • Buffalo, New York (National Championship)	ESPN2	Shepard	W 3–0	13,624	29–11–2
*Non-conference game. ^{#}Rankings from USCHO.com Poll. All times are in Central Time. Source:

== Scoring Statistics ==
Name	Position	Games	Goals	Assists	Points	PIM
Parker Mackay	RW	40	16	17	33	14
Justin Richards	C	42	12	20	32	18
Scott Perunovich	D	39	3	26	29	32
Mikey Anderson	D	40	6	21	27	18
Nick Swaney	RW	40	15	10	25	0
Peter Krieger	C/RW	41	9	15	24	41
Noah Cates	LW	40	9	14	23	33
Riley Tufte	LW	42	9	10	19	30
Dylan Samberg	D	39	7	12	19	35
Cole Koepke	LW	42	7	12	19	14
Nick Wolff	D	42	5	13	18	80
Kobe Roth	F	42	8	7	15	2
Jackson Cates	C	39	8	6	14	14
Tanner Laderoute	F	38	7	5	12	22
Jade Miller	LW	33	3	8	11	8
Louie Roehl	D	42	2	8	10	40
Billy Exell	RW	42	3	3	6	14
Matt Anderson	D	42	0	6	6	14
Koby Bender	C/LW	16	3	1	4	0
Jesse Jacques	F	21	1	1	2	6
Jarod Hilderman	D	9	0	1	1	2
Hunter Shepard	G	42	0	1	1	0
Nick Deery	G	1	0	0	0	0
Jake Rosenbaum	D	2	0	0	0	2
Hunter Lellig	D	25	0	0	0	8
Bench	-	-	-	-	-	6
Total			133	217	350	453

== Goaltending statistics ==
Name	Games	Minutes	Wins	Losses	Ties	Goals against	Saves	Shut outs	SV %	GAA
Hunter Shepard	42	2556:19	29	11	2	75	899	7	.923	1.76
Nick Deery	1	16:09	0	0	0	1	4	0	.800	3.72
Empty Net	-	16:53	-	-	-	3	-	-	-	-
Total	42	2589:21	29	11	2	79	903	7	.920	1.83

== Rankings ==
Poll	Week																										
Poll	Pre	1	2	3	4	5	6	7	8	9	10	11	12	13	14	15	16	17	18	19	20	21	22	23	24	25	26 (Final)
USCHO.com	1 (44)	3 (8)	3	3 (5)	1 (47)	1 (44)	1 (41)	2 (7)	2 (3)	4 (1)	4	-	-	5	5	5	3 (7)	5	4	3	3	3	4	4	2 (3)	-	1 (50)
USA Today	1 (30)	2 (7)	2 (3)	2 (6)	1 (33)	1 (30)	1 (29)	2 (5)	2 (2)	3 (1)	4	3	5	5	4	5	3 (1)	5	4	3	3	3	4	4	2	1 (21)	1 (34)

Note: USCHO did not release a poll in weeks 11, 12, and 25.

== Awards and honors ==
Player	Award	Ref
Parker Mackay	NCAA Tournament Most Outstanding Player	
Hunter Shepard	AHCA West First Team All-American	
Scott Perunovich	AHCA West Second Team All-American	
Hunter Shepard	NCHC Goaltender of the Year	
Scott Perunovich	NCHC Offensive Defenseman of the Year	
Justin Richards	NCHC Defensive Forward of the Year	
Hunter Shepard	NCHC Three Stars Award	
Hunter Shepard	Frozen Faceoff MVP	
Hunter Shepard	All-NCHC First Team	
Scott Perunovich	All-NCHC First Team	
Justin Richards	All-NCHC Second Team	
Noah Cates	NCHC All-Rookie Team	
Hunter Shepard	Frozen Faceoff All-Tournament Team	
Mikey Anderson	Frozen Faceoff All-Tournament Team	
Hunter Shepard	NCAA All-Tournament Team	
Mikey Anderson	NCAA All-Tournament Team	
Parker Mackay	NCAA All-Tournament Team	
Justin Richards	NCAA All-Tournament Team	
Billy Exell	NCAA All-Tournament Team	

== Players drafted into the NHL ==
=== 2019 NHL entry draft ===
= NHL All-Star team	= NHL All-Star	= NHL All-Star and NHL All-Star team	= Did not play in the NHL

Round	Pick	Player	NHL team
3	92	Quinn Olson ^{†}	Boston Bruins

† incoming freshman
