= NSCC =

NSCC may refer to:

== Medicine ==
- Neoplastic spinal cord compression
- Non-small-cell lung carcinoma

== Organisations ==
- National Securities Clearing Corporation
- North Seattle Community College
- North Shore Community College
- Northwest State Community College
- Nova Scotia Community College
- United States Naval Sea Cadet Corps

== Other ==
- National Supercomputing Center of Tianjin
- North Star College Cup
