= 2019 NCHC Tournament =

2019 NCHC Men's ice hockey tournament
- Dates: March 15–23, 2019
- Teams: 8
- Finals site: Xcel Energy Center; Saint Paul, Minnesota
- Champions: Minnesota-Duluth (2nd title)
- Winning coach: Scott Sandelin (2nd title)
- MVP: Hunter Sheppard (Minnesota–Duluth)
- NCHC Men's Ice Hockey Tournaments

The 2019 NCHC Tournament is the sixth tournament in league history. It was played between March 15 and 23, 2019. Quarterfinal were played at home team campus sites, while the final four games were played at the Xcel Energy Center in Saint Paul, Minnesota. By winning the tournament, Minnesota-Duluth received the NCHC's automatic bid to the 2019 NCAA Division I Men's Ice Hockey Tournament.

== Format ==
The first round of the postseason tournament features a best-of-three games format. All eight conference teams participate in the tournament. Teams are seeded No. 1 through No. 8 according to their final conference standing, with a tiebreaker system used to seed teams with an identical number of points accumulated. The top four seeded teams each earn home ice and host one of the lower seeded teams.

The winners of the first round series advance to the Xcel Energy Center for the NCHC Frozen Faceoff. The Frozen Faceoff uses a single-elimination format. Teams are re-seeded No. 1 through No. 4 according to the final regular season conference standings.

Game 1 of the series between Western Michigan and Colorado College was delayed 1 day due to the effects from Winter Storm Ulmer.

=== Standings ===
2018–19 National Collegiate Hockey Conference Standings
| | Conference record | | | | | | | | Overall record | | | | | |
| | GP | W | L | T | 3/SW | PTS | GF | GA | GP | W | L | T | GF | GA |
|---|---|---|---|---|---|---|---|---|---|---|---|---|---|---|
| #5 St. Cloud State † | 24 | 19 | 2 | 3 | 2 | 62 | 94 | 52 | 39 | 30 | 6 | 3 | 156 | 85 |
| #1 Minnesota Duluth * | 24 | 14 | 9 | 1 | 0 | 43 | 75 | 48 | 42 | 29 | 11 | 2 | 133 | 79 |
| #18 Western Michigan | 24 | 13 | 10 | 1 | 1 | 41 | 79 | 78 | 37 | 21 | 15 | 1 | 129 | 115 |
| #3 Denver | 24 | 11 | 10 | 3 | 3 | 39 | 55 | 56 | 41 | 24 | 12 | 5 | 116 | 83 |
| #20 North Dakota | 24 | 12 | 11 | 1 | 0 | 37 | 56 | 55 | 37 | 18 | 17 | 2 | 93 | 90 |
| Colorado College | 24 | 9 | 12 | 3 | 0 | 30 | 66 | 66 | 41 | 17 | 20 | 4 | 117 | 114 |
| Omaha | 24 | 5 | 17 | 2 | 1 | 18 | 53 | 86 | 36 | 9 | 24 | 3 | 90 | 132 |
| Miami | 24 | 5 | 17 | 2 | 1 | 18 | 49 | 86 | 38 | 11 | 23 | 4 | 87 | 122 |
Championship: March 23, 2019 † indicates conference regular season champion (Penrose Cup) * indicates conference tournament champion Rankings: USCHO.com Top 20 Poll

== Bracket ==
Teams are reseeded for the Semifinals

Quarterfinals; March 15–18
1 | St. Cloud State | 5 | 6
8 | Miami | 2 | 3
4 | Denver | 2 | 4
5 | North Dakota | 0 | 2
(Pairings are reseeded after the first round)
3 | Western Michigan | 1 | 5 | 2
6 | Colorado College | 2 | 2 | 3
2 | Minnesota–Duluth | 2* | 4
7 | Omaha | 1 | 1

Semifinals; March 22
1 | St. Cloud State | 5
6 | Colorado College | 2
2 | Minnesota–Duluth | 3
4 | Denver | 0

Championship; March 23
1 | St. Cloud State | 2
2 | Minnesota–Duluth | 3**
Third Place
4 | Denver | 6
6 | Colorado College | 1

* denotes overtime periods

== Results ==
All times are local.

=== Quarterfinals ===
==== (1) St. Cloud State vs. (8) Miami ====
| March 15 | St. Cloud State | 5 – 2 | Miami | Herb Brooks National Hockey Center | Recap |
| (Ahcan, J. Poehling) Nick Poehling – 03:43 (Brodzinski, B. Lizotte) Robby Jackson – PP – 17:35 | | First period | No scoring |
| (N. Poehling, J. Poehling) Ryan Poehling – GW – 14:30 | | Second period | 11:18 – Ben Lown (Mahalak, Rymsha) |
| (unassisted) Jack Ahcan – 03:57 (Fitzgerald, J. Lizotte) Easton Brodzinski – 16:12 | | Third period | 00:24 – River Rymsha (Gruden) |
| ( 23 saves / 25 shots ) Dávid Hrenák | | Goalie stats | Ryan Larkin ( 32 saves / 37 shots ) |

| March 16 | St. Cloud State | 6 – 3 | Miami | Herb Brooks National Hockey Center | Recap |
| No Scoring | | First period | 06:23 – Karch Bachman (Daschke) |
| (Hentges) Easton Brodzinski – 04:32 (Jackson, B. Lizotte) Jimmy Schuldt – 05:55 | | Second period | 11:53 – Karch Bachman (Lown, Mahalak) |
| (Newell, Schuldt) Robby Jackson – 00:49 (Brodzinski) Sam Hentges – GW – 06:42 (Hentges) Easton Brodzinski – 11:12 (Jackson, Newell) Blake Lizotte – EN – 17:27 | | Third period | 04:38 – Brian Hawkinson (Corbett, Hutton) |
| ( 18 saves / 21 shots ) Dávid Hrenák | | Goalie stats | Ryan Larkin ( 39 saves / 44 shots ) |

| St. Cloud State won series 2–0 |

==== (2) Minnesota–Duluth vs. (7) Omaha ====
| March 15 | Minnesota–Duluth | 2 – 1 | OT | Omaha | AMSOIL Arena | Recap |
| No Scoring | | First period | | No scoring |
| (Mackay, Samberg) Riley Tufte – 03:31 | | Second period | | No scoring |
| No scoring | | Third period | | 19:04 – EA – Kevin Conley (Jones, Weiss) |
| (Miller, Anderson) Nick Swaney – GW – 13:42 | | First overtime period | | No scoring |
| ( 27 saves / 28 shots ) Hunter Shepard | | Goalie stats | | Evan Weninger ( 39 saves / 41 shots ) |

| March 16 | Minnesota–Duluth | 4 – 1 | Omaha | AMSOIL Arena | Recap |
| (Anderson, Samberg) Jackson Cates – 11:46 | | First period | 09:40 – Taylor Ward (Morelli, Olofsson) |
| (Anderson, Krieger) Kobe Roth – GW PP – 07:14 (Richards, Mackay) Cole Koepke – 19:54 | | Second period | No scoring |
| (Cates, Wolff) Peter Krieger – 06:11 | | Third period | No scoring |
| ( 18 saves / 19 shots ) Hunter Shepard | | Goalie stats | Evan Weninger ( 29 saves / 33 shots ) |

| Minnesota–Duluth won series 2–0 |

==== (3) Western Michigan vs. (6) Colorado College ====
| March 16 | Western Michigan | 1 – 2 | Colorado College | Lawson Ice Arena | Recap |
| (Passolt, Rueschhoff) Drew Worrad – 02:04 | | First period | 11:57 – Mason Bergh (Conzo, Bradley) |
| No scoring | | Second period | No scoring |
| No scoring | | Third period | No scoring |
| No scoring | | overtime period | 06:42 – GW – Erik Middendorf (Copeland, Versich) |
| ( 23 saves / 25 shots ) Trevor Gorsuch | | Goalie stats | Alex Leclerc ( 29 saves / 30 shots ) |

| March 17 | Western Michigan | 5 – 2 | Colorado College | Lawson Ice Arena | Recap |
| (Allison, Lee) Dawson DiPietro – 01:56 | | First period | No scoring |
| (DiPietro, Lee) Colt Conrad – 16:51 (Conrad, Passolt) Corey Schueneman – GW – 19:33 | | Second period | 09:40 – Troy Conzo (Bergh); 19:48 – Bryan Yoon (Michaud) |
| (Orchard, Passolt) Austin Rueschhoff – 01:44 (Schueneman) Dawson DiPietro – 13:08 | | Third period | No scoring |
| ( 25 saves / 27 shots ) Trevor Gorsuch | | Goalie stats | Alex Leclerc ( 35 saves / 40 shots ) |

| March 18 | Western Michigan | 2 – 3 | Colorado College | Lawson Ice Arena | Recap |
| No Scoring | | First period | 16:47 – PP – Westin Michaud (Bergh, Yoon) |
| (Passolt, Orchard) Austin Rueschhoff – 18:49 | | Second period | No scoring |
| (Orchard, Passolt) Austin Rueschhoff – EA – 17:36 | | Third period | 05:16 – Alex Berardinelli (Copeland, Michaud); 07:16 – GW – Trevor Gooch (Yoon, Bergh) |
| ( 22 saves / 25 shots ) Trevor Gorsuch | | Goalie stats | Alex Leclerc ( 32 saves / 34 shots ) |

| Colorado College won series 2–1 |

==== (4) Denver vs. (5) North Dakota ====
| March 15 | Denver | 2 – 0 | North Dakota | Magness Arena | Recap |
| (Lukosevicius, Davies) Tyson McLellan – GW – 19:00 | | First period | No scoring |
| No scoring | | Second period | No scoring |
| (Heikkinen) Griffin Mendel – 11:44 | | Third period | No scoring |
| ( 32 saves / 32 shots ) Filip Larsson | | Goalie stats | Peter Thome ( 15 saves / 17 shots ) |

| March 16 | Denver | 4 – 2 | North Dakota | Magness Arena | Recap |
| (Lancaster, Mitchell) Cole Guttman – PP – 03:45 | | First period | 14:33 – Nick Jones (Mismash, Bernard-Docker) |
| (Mendel, Mitchell) Colin Staub – 01:02 (Guttman, Pettersen) Jarid Lukosevicius – GW – 14:38 | | Second period | No scoring |
| (unassisted) Jaakko Heikkinen – EN – 18:27 | | Third period | 05:42 – Nick Jones (Shaw) |
| ( 40 saves / 42 shots ) Filip Larsson | | Goalie stats | Peter Thome ( 14 saves / 17 shots ) |

| Denver won series 2–0 |

=== Semifinals ===
==== (1) St. Cloud State vs. (6) Colorado College ====
| March 22 | St. Cloud State | 5 – 2 | Colorado College | Xcel Energy Center | Recap |
| (B. Lizotte, Schuldt) Patrick Newell - PP - 12:51 (J. Lizotte) Nolan Walker - 12:51 | | First period | 09:47 - PP - Westin Michaud (Bradley, Yoon) |
| (Meier, B. Lizotte) Robby Jackson - GW - 09:38 | | Second period | 04:39 - Nick Jones (Olson, Poolman) |
| (Newell, Fitzgerald) Jack Ahcan - 12:51 (Fitzgerald, Bushy) Nick Poehling - 16:47 | | Third period | 14:47 - PP - Westin Michaud (Yoon, Bergh) |
| ( 31 saves / 33 shots ) Dávid Hrenák | | Goalie stats | Alex Leclerc ( 22 saves / 27 shots ) |

==== (2) Minnesota–Duluth vs. (4) Denver ====
| March 22 | Denver | 0 – 3 | Minnesota–Duluth | Xcel Energy Center | Recap |
| No Scoring | | First period | No scoring |
| No scoring | | Second period | No scoring |
| (unassisted) Cole Koepke - GW - 00:42 (unassisted) Louie Roehl - EN - 18:22 (unassisted) Cole Koepke - EN - 19:39 | | Third period | No scoring |
| ( 25 saves / 25 shots ) Hunter Shepard | | Goalie stats | Filip Larsson ( 30 saves / 31 shots ) |

=== Third place ===
==== (4) Denver vs. (6) Colorado College ====
| March 23 | Denver | 6 – 1 | Colorado College | Xcel Energy Center | Recap |
| (Pettersen) Jarid Lukosevicius - 05:49 | | First period | 15:01 - PP - Trey Bradley (Bergh, Versich) |
| (Lancaster, Pettersen) Ian Mitchell - GW PP - 08:29 (Davies, Stapley) Liam Finlay - 09:28 | | Second period | No scoring |
| (Finlay, McLellan) Ian Mitchell - 00:27 (McLellan, Mitchell) Liam Finlay - 05:37 (Stapley, Mitchell) Tyson McLellan - 12:11 | | Third period | No scoring |
| ( 22 saves / 23 shots ) Devin Cooley | | Goalie stats | Alex Leclerc ( 23 saves / 29 shots ) |

=== Championship ===
==== (1) St. Cloud State vs. (2) Minnesota–Duluth ====
| March 17 | St. Cloud State | 2 – 3 | 2OT | Minnesota–Duluth | Xcel Energy Center | Recap |
| (B. Lizotte, Newell) Robby Jackson - EA - 07:45 | | First period | | 10:49 - Mikey Anderson (Perunovich, Mackay) |
| No scoring | | Second period | | No scoring |
| (B. Lizotte, Achan) Patrick Newell - PP - 00:28 | | Third period | | 15:09 - SH - Billy Exell (Laderoute) |
| No scoring | | Second overtime period | | 07:29 - GW - Nick Swaney (Laderoute, Jacques) |
| ( 27 saves / 30 shots ) Dávid Hrenák | | Goalie stats | | Hunter Shepard ( 37 saves / 39 shots ) |

== Tournament awards ==
=== Frozen Faceoff All-Tournament Team ===
- F Robby Jackson (St. Cloud State)
- F Blake Lizotte (St. Cloud State)
- F Patrick Newell (St. Cloud State)
- D Jimmy Schuldt (St. Cloud State)
- D Mikey Anderson (Minnesota–Duluth)
- G Hunter Shepard* (Minnesota–Duluth)

* Most Valuable Player(s)
