= Minnesota–Minnesota Duluth men's ice hockey rivalry =

College sports rivalry

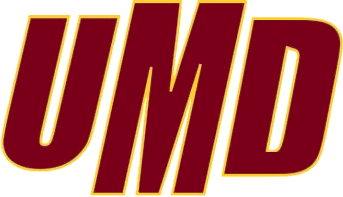
- Minnesota Golden Gophers Minnesota Duluth Bulldogs
- Sport: Ice hockey
- First meeting: December 13, 1952; Minnesota 14, Minnesota Duluth 2
- Latest meeting: October 25, 2025; Minnesota Duluth 4, Minnesota 1
- Next meeting: October 16, 2026 AT AMSOIL Arena
- Stadiums: 3M Arena at Mariucci; AMSOIL Arena

Statistics
- Total meetings: 243
- All-time series: Minnesota leads, 137–87–19 (.603)
- Largest victory: Minnesota, 14–2 (13 December 1952); Minnesota Duluth, 15–3 (17 December 1972)
- Longest win streak: Minnesota, 13 (26 October 1974 – 29 October 1976)
- Longest unbeaten streak: Minnesota, 21 (26 October 1974 – 17 November 1978)
- Current win streak: Minnesota Duluth, 2 (October 24, 2025–present)

The Minnesota–Minnesota Duluth men's ice hockey rivalry is a college ice hockey rivalry between the Minnesota Golden Gophers men's ice hockey and Minnesota Duluth Bulldogs men's ice hockey programs. The first meeting between the two occurred on 13 December 1952 but wasn't played annually until 1962.

== History ==
Minnesota was one for the first 'western' teams to play college ice hockey when they held their first official game in January 1922. Less than a decade later, Duluth State Teachers College founded their own varsity team, however, due in part to the Great Depression, the program lasted only two years before being mothballed. After World War II the school decided to bring the team back and began playing in the MIAC. Over the succeeding 15 years, the two teams only played a single game against one another, primarily because MIAC teams were considered 'lower-tier' programs and the University of Minnesota was among the 'higher-tier' clubs.

In 1961, after winning 9 consecutive MIAC championships, UMD decided to raise the profile of its ice hockey program and left the MIAC. Over the next four years, while playing as an independent, the Bulldogs began an annual series with Minnesota and quickly gained acceptance by the other western programs. Minnesota Duluth joined the WCHA in 1965 and became a conference rival of Minnesota's for most of the next fifty years. During this period, Minnesota had a decided advantage in terms of wins and losses though Duluth got their fair share as well.

In 2013, as a result of the Big Ten Conference forming an ice hockey division, Minnesota and Minnesota Duluth ended up in different conferences. To help continue their long-standing rivalry, the North Star College Cup was organized between four schools from Minnesota. Unfortunately, there wasn't enough interest in the tournament to keep it going after four years. Instead, the two programs began holding a home-and-home series at the beginning of the year. They have done so every year beginning in 2017 with the exception of the 2020–21 season. That year the series was not allowed due to the moratorium on non-conference play resulting from the COVID-19 pandemic.

== Game results ==
Full game results for the rivalry, with rankings beginning in the 1998–99 season.

Minnesota victories	Minnesota Duluth victories	Tie games

No.	Date	Location	Winning team		Losing team		Notes
1	13 December 1952	Duluth Curling and Skating Club; Duluth, MN	Minnesota	14	Minnesota Duluth	2	
2	19 January 1962	Williams Arena; Minneapolis, MN	Minnesota	6	Minnesota Duluth	1	
3	20 January 1962	Duluth Curling and Skating Club; Duluth, MN	Minnesota	6	Minnesota Duluth	4	
4	15 December 1962	Williams Arena; Minneapolis, MN	Minnesota	7	Minnesota Duluth	2	
5	21 December 1962	Williams Arena; Minneapolis, MN	Minnesota	7	Minnesota Duluth	2	
6	22 December 1962	Duluth Curling and Skating Club; Duluth, MN	Tie	4	Tie	4	(OT)
7	12 February 1963	Duluth Curling and Skating Club; Duluth, MN	Minnesota	7	Minnesota Duluth	1	
8	29 November 1963	Williams Arena; Minneapolis, MN	Minnesota Duluth	5	Minnesota	2	
9	17 January 1964	Williams Arena; Minneapolis, MN	Minnesota Duluth	6	Minnesota	3	
10	18 January 1964	Williams Arena; Minneapolis, MN	Minnesota	4	Minnesota Duluth	1	
11	9 December 1964	Williams Arena; Minneapolis, MN	Minnesota Duluth	6	Minnesota	5	
12	5 February 1965	Williams Arena; Minneapolis, MN	Minnesota	9	Minnesota Duluth	3	
13	6 February 1965	Williams Arena; Minneapolis, MN	Minnesota	5	Minnesota Duluth	2	
14	23 February 1965	Williams Arena; Minneapolis, MN	Minnesota Duluth	4	Minnesota	2	
15	2 January 1966	Duluth Curling and Skating Club; Duluth, MN	Minnesota	5	Minnesota Duluth	4	WCHA play begins
16	8 February 1966	Williams Arena; Minneapolis, MN	Minnesota	5	Minnesota Duluth	3	
17	19 November 1966	Duluth Entertainment Convention Center; Duluth, MN	Minnesota Duluth	8	Minnesota	1	
18	20 January 1967	Williams Arena; Minneapolis, MN	Minnesota	9	Minnesota Duluth	4	
19	21 January 1967	Williams Arena; Minneapolis, MN	Minnesota Duluth	7	Minnesota	4	
20	18 November 1967	Duluth Entertainment Convention Center; Duluth, MN	Minnesota	5	Minnesota Duluth	1	
21	19 December 1967	Williams Arena; Minneapolis, MN	Minnesota	7	Minnesota Duluth	2	
22	16 February 1968	Williams Arena; Minneapolis, MN	Minnesota	4	Minnesota Duluth	0	
23	17 February 1968	Duluth Entertainment Convention Center; Duluth, MN	Minnesota	6	Minnesota Duluth	5	
24	22 November 1968	Duluth Entertainment Convention Center; Duluth, MN	Minnesota Duluth	5	Minnesota	3	
25	23 November 1968	Duluth Entertainment Convention Center; Duluth, MN	Minnesota	3	Minnesota Duluth	1	
26	7 February 1969	Williams Arena; Minneapolis, MN	Minnesota	4	Minnesota Duluth	3	
27	8 February 1969	Williams Arena; Minneapolis, MN	Minnesota	6	Minnesota Duluth	1	
28	14 November 1969	Duluth Entertainment Convention Center; Duluth, MN	Minnesota Duluth	7	Minnesota	3	
29	15 November 1969	Duluth Entertainment Convention Center; Duluth, MN	Minnesota	3	Minnesota Duluth	2	(OT)
30	9 January 1970	Williams Arena; Minneapolis, MN	Minnesota	2	Minnesota Duluth	1	(OT)
31	10 January 1970	Williams Arena; Minneapolis, MN	Minnesota	3	Minnesota Duluth	2	(OT)
32	12 March 1970	Duluth Entertainment Convention Center; Duluth, MN	Minnesota	3	Minnesota Duluth	2	(3OT); WCHA East Regional semifinal
33	13 November 1970	Duluth Entertainment Convention Center; Duluth, MN	Minnesota Duluth	6	Minnesota	3	
34	14 November 1970	Duluth Entertainment Convention Center; Duluth, MN	Minnesota Duluth	7	Minnesota	2	
35	8 January 1971	Williams Arena; Minneapolis, MN	Minnesota	5	Minnesota Duluth	1	
36	9 January 1971	Williams Arena; Minneapolis, MN	Minnesota	3	Minnesota Duluth	1	
37	12 November 1971	Duluth Entertainment Convention Center; Duluth, MN	Minnesota Duluth	4	Minnesota	1	
38	13 November 1971	Duluth Entertainment Convention Center; Duluth, MN	Minnesota Duluth	5	Minnesota	2	
39	17 December 1972	Williams Arena; Minneapolis, MN	Minnesota Duluth	15	Minnesota	3	
40	18 December 1972	Williams Arena; Minneapolis, MN	Minnesota	5	Minnesota Duluth	3	
41	2 February 1973	Duluth Entertainment Convention Center; Duluth, MN	Minnesota	3	Minnesota Duluth	2	
42	3 February 1973	Duluth Entertainment Convention Center; Duluth, MN	Minnesota Duluth	7	Minnesota	5	
43	23 February 1973	Williams Arena; Minneapolis, MN	Minnesota Duluth	8	Minnesota	0	
44	24 February 1973	Williams Arena; Minneapolis, MN	Minnesota Duluth	5	Minnesota	3	
45	27 October 1973	Duluth Entertainment Convention Center; Duluth, MN	Minnesota Duluth	4	Minnesota	3	
46	14 December 1973	Williams Arena; Minneapolis, MN	Tie	3	Tie	3	(OT)
47	15 December 1973	Williams Arena; Minneapolis, MN	Minnesota	6	Minnesota Duluth	5	
48	11 January 1974	Duluth Entertainment Convention Center; Duluth, MN	Minnesota Duluth	4	Minnesota	3	
49	12 January 1974	Duluth Entertainment Convention Center; Duluth, MN	Minnesota Duluth	5	Minnesota	2	
50	25 October 1974	Duluth Entertainment Convention Center; Duluth, MN	Minnesota Duluth	4	Minnesota	3	
51	26 October 1974	Eveleth Hippodrome; Eveleth, MN	Minnesota	3	Minnesota Duluth	2	(OT); United States Hockey Hall of Fame game
52	29 November 1974	Williams Arena; Minneapolis, MN	Minnesota	5	Minnesota Duluth	4	
53	30 November 1974	Williams Arena; Minneapolis, MN	Minnesota	3	Minnesota Duluth	2	(OT)
54	11 January 1975	Duluth Entertainment Convention Center; Duluth, MN	Minnesota	6	Minnesota Duluth	5	
55	12 January 1975	Duluth Entertainment Convention Center; Duluth, MN	Minnesota	7	Minnesota Duluth	6	(OT)
56	4 March 1975	Williams Arena; Minneapolis, MN	Minnesota	6	Minnesota Duluth	0	WCHA first round game 1
57	5 March 1975	Williams Arena; Minneapolis, MN	Minnesota	4	Minnesota Duluth	2	WCHA first round game 2
58	7 November 1975	Williams Arena; Minneapolis, MN	Minnesota	5	Minnesota Duluth	4	(OT)
59	8 November 1975	Williams Arena; Minneapolis, MN	Minnesota	4	Minnesota Duluth	2	
60	30 January 1976	Duluth Entertainment Convention Center; Duluth, MN	Minnesota	5	Minnesota Duluth	3	
61	31 January 1976	Duluth Entertainment Convention Center; Duluth, MN	Minnesota	6	Minnesota Duluth	3	
62	16 October 1976	Eveleth Hippodrome; Eveleth, MN	Minnesota	9	Minnesota Duluth	5	United States Hockey Hall of Fame game
63	29 October 1976	Williams Arena; Minneapolis, MN	Minnesota	4	Minnesota Duluth	3	
64	30 October 1976	Williams Arena; Minneapolis, MN	Tie	3	Tie	3	(OT)
65	11 February 1977	Duluth Entertainment Convention Center; Duluth, MN	Minnesota	6	Minnesota Duluth	4	
66	12 February 1977	Duluth Entertainment Convention Center; Duluth, MN	Minnesota	7	Minnesota Duluth	3	
67	28 October 1977	Williams Arena; Minneapolis, MN	Minnesota	5	Minnesota Duluth	2	
68	29 October 1977	Williams Arena; Minneapolis, MN	Minnesota	3	Minnesota Duluth	2	
69	27 January 1978	Duluth Entertainment Convention Center; Duluth, MN	Minnesota	4	Minnesota Duluth	2	
70	28 January 1978	Duluth Entertainment Convention Center; Duluth, MN	Minnesota	6	Minnesota Duluth	5	
71	17 November 1978	Duluth Entertainment Convention Center; Duluth, MN	Minnesota	5	Minnesota Duluth	4	(OT)
72	18 November 1978	Duluth Entertainment Convention Center; Duluth, MN	Minnesota Duluth	5	Minnesota	4	
73	12 January 1979	Williams Arena; Minneapolis, MN	Tie	6	Tie	6	(OT)
74	13 January 1979	Williams Arena; Minneapolis, MN	Minnesota Duluth	6	Minnesota	1	
75	10 March 1979	Williams Arena; Minneapolis, MN	Minnesota	2	Minnesota Duluth	1	WCHA second round game 1
76	11 March 1979	Williams Arena; Minneapolis, MN	Minnesota	6	Minnesota Duluth	3	WCHA second round game 2
77	16 November 1979	Duluth Entertainment Convention Center; Duluth, MN	Minnesota	5	Minnesota Duluth	4	
78	17 November 1979	Duluth Entertainment Convention Center; Duluth, MN	Minnesota Duluth	6	Minnesota	3	
79	22 February 1980	Williams Arena; Minneapolis, MN	Minnesota	7	Minnesota Duluth	5	
80	23 February 1980	Williams Arena; Minneapolis, MN	Minnesota Duluth	7	Minnesota	4	
81	14 November 1980	Duluth Entertainment Convention Center; Duluth, MN	Minnesota Duluth	8	Minnesota	0	
82	15 November 1980	Duluth Entertainment Convention Center; Duluth, MN	Minnesota Duluth	6	Minnesota	5	
83	20 February 1981	Williams Arena; Minneapolis, MN	Minnesota	5	Minnesota Duluth	2	
84	21 February 1981	Williams Arena; Minneapolis, MN	Minnesota	9	Minnesota Duluth	1	
85	6 March 1981	Williams Arena; Minneapolis, MN	Minnesota	5	Minnesota Duluth	1	WCHA first round game 1
86	7 March 1981	Williams Arena; Minneapolis, MN	Minnesota Duluth	7	Minnesota	5	WCHA first round game 2
87	18 December 1981	Williams Arena; Minneapolis, MN	Tie	6	Tie	6	(OT)
88	19 December 1981	Williams Arena; Minneapolis, MN	Minnesota Duluth	4	Minnesota	2	
89	15 January 1982	Duluth Entertainment Convention Center; Duluth, MN	Minnesota	5	Minnesota Duluth	1	
90	16 January 1982	Duluth Entertainment Convention Center; Duluth, MN	Minnesota Duluth	6	Minnesota	3	
91	5 February 1982	Williams Arena; Minneapolis, MN	Minnesota Duluth	5	Minnesota	3	
92	6 February 1982	Williams Arena; Minneapolis, MN	Minnesota	6	Minnesota Duluth	3	
93	5 November 1982	Duluth Entertainment Convention Center; Duluth, MN	Minnesota	4	Minnesota Duluth	2	
94	6 November 1982	Duluth Entertainment Convention Center; Duluth, MN	Minnesota Duluth	4	Minnesota	1	
95	14 January 1983	Duluth Entertainment Convention Center; Duluth, MN	Minnesota Duluth	9	Minnesota	3	
96	15 January 1983	Duluth Entertainment Convention Center; Duluth, MN	Minnesota	5	Minnesota Duluth	2	
97	28 January 1983	Williams Arena; Minneapolis, MN	Minnesota	4	Minnesota Duluth	3	
98	29 January 1983	Williams Arena; Minneapolis, MN	Minnesota	3	Minnesota Duluth	2	(OT)
99	4 March 1983	Williams Arena; Minneapolis, MN	Minnesota	8	Minnesota Duluth	2	WCHA first round game 1
100	5 March 1983	Williams Arena; Minneapolis, MN	Minnesota Duluth	4	Minnesota	3	WCHA first round game 2
101	4 November 1983	Duluth Entertainment Convention Center; Duluth, MN	Minnesota	5	Minnesota Duluth	4	(OT)
102	5 November 1983	Duluth Entertainment Convention Center; Duluth, MN	Tie	3	Tie	3	(OT)
103	6 January 1984	Williams Arena; Minneapolis, MN	Minnesota Duluth	7	Minnesota	2	
104	7 January 1984	Williams Arena; Minneapolis, MN	Minnesota Duluth	5	Minnesota	4	
105	10 February 1984	Williams Arena; Minneapolis, MN	Minnesota	4	Minnesota Duluth	2	
106	11 February 1984	Williams Arena; Minneapolis, MN	Minnesota Duluth	6	Minnesota	3	
107	18 January 1985	Duluth Entertainment Convention Center; Duluth, MN	Tie	6	Tie	6	(OT)
108	19 January 1985	Duluth Entertainment Convention Center; Duluth, MN	Minnesota Duluth	8	Minnesota	6	
109	15 March 1985	Duluth Entertainment Convention Center; Duluth, MN	Minnesota	6	Minnesota Duluth	4	WCHA first round game 1
110	16 March 1985	Duluth Entertainment Convention Center; Duluth, MN	Minnesota Duluth	6	Minnesota	2	WCHA first round game 2
111	25 October 1985	Duluth Entertainment Convention Center; Duluth, MN	Minnesota	4	Minnesota Duluth	2	
112	26 October 1985	Duluth Entertainment Convention Center; Duluth, MN	Minnesota Duluth	5	Minnesota	2	
113	14 February 1986	Williams Arena; Minneapolis, MN	Minnesota	4	Minnesota Duluth	3	
114	15 February 1986	Williams Arena; Minneapolis, MN	Minnesota	6	Minnesota Duluth	3	
115	17 October 1986	Williams Arena; Minneapolis, MN	Minnesota	8	Minnesota Duluth	6	
116	18 October 1986	Williams Arena; Minneapolis, MN	Minnesota	8	Minnesota Duluth	6	
117	13 February 1987	Duluth Entertainment Convention Center; Duluth, MN	Minnesota	6	Minnesota Duluth	3	
118	14 February 1987	Duluth Entertainment Convention Center; Duluth, MN	Minnesota	5	Minnesota Duluth	1	
119	27 November 1987	Williams Arena; Minneapolis, MN	Minnesota	6	Minnesota Duluth	1	
120	28 November 1987	Williams Arena; Minneapolis, MN	Minnesota	4	Minnesota Duluth	2	
121	22 January 1988	Duluth Entertainment Convention Center; Duluth, MN	Minnesota	6	Minnesota Duluth	5	(OT)
122	23 January 1988	Duluth Entertainment Convention Center; Duluth, MN	Minnesota Duluth	2	Minnesota	1	
123	6 March 1988	St. Paul Civic Center; Saint Paul, MN	Minnesota	6	Minnesota Duluth	0	WCHA Final Four
124	18 November 1988	Duluth Entertainment Convention Center; Duluth, MN	Minnesota Duluth	3	Minnesota	1	
125	19 November 1988	Duluth Entertainment Convention Center; Duluth, MN	Minnesota	4	Minnesota Duluth	2	
126	2 December 1988	Williams Arena; Minneapolis, MN	Minnesota Duluth	5	Minnesota	2	
127	3 December 1988	Williams Arena; Minneapolis, MN	Minnesota	7	Minnesota Duluth	1	
128	20 October 1989	Williams Arena; Minneapolis, MN	Minnesota Duluth	9	Minnesota	6	
129	21 October 1989	Williams Arena; Minneapolis, MN	Minnesota Duluth	4	Minnesota	2	
130	19 January 1990	Duluth Entertainment Convention Center; Duluth, MN	Minnesota	4	Minnesota Duluth	1	
131	20 January 1990	Duluth Entertainment Convention Center; Duluth, MN	Minnesota	5	Minnesota Duluth	2	
132	9 November 1990	Duluth Entertainment Convention Center; Duluth, MN	Minnesota	3	Minnesota Duluth	2	
133	10 November 1990	Duluth Entertainment Convention Center; Duluth, MN	Minnesota	6	Minnesota Duluth	2	
134	31 January 1991	Williams Arena; Minneapolis, MN	Minnesota Duluth	5	Minnesota	3	
135	1 February 1991	Williams Arena; Minneapolis, MN	Tie	3	Tie	3	(OT)
136	18 October 1991	Duluth Entertainment Convention Center; Duluth, MN	Minnesota	7	Minnesota Duluth	3	
137	19 October 1991	Duluth Entertainment Convention Center; Duluth, MN	Minnesota Duluth	7	Minnesota	4	
138	10 January 1992	Williams Arena; Minneapolis, MN	Minnesota	3	Minnesota Duluth	0	
139	11 January 1992	Williams Arena; Minneapolis, MN	Minnesota	5	Minnesota Duluth	4	(OT)
140	8 January 1993	Williams Arena; Minneapolis, MN	Minnesota Duluth	4	Minnesota	3	
141	9 January 1993	Williams Arena; Minneapolis, MN	Minnesota	6	Minnesota Duluth	5	(OT)
142	22 January 1993	Duluth Entertainment Convention Center; Duluth, MN	Minnesota Duluth	8	Minnesota	4	
143	23 January 1993	Duluth Entertainment Convention Center; Duluth, MN	Minnesota Duluth	7	Minnesota	4	
144	12 November 1993	Duluth Entertainment Convention Center; Duluth, MN	Minnesota	3	Minnesota Duluth	1	
145	13 November 1993	Duluth Entertainment Convention Center; Duluth, MN	Tie	3	Tie	3	(OT)
146	5 February 1994	Mariucci Arena; Minneapolis, MN	Minnesota	3	Minnesota Duluth	2	(OT)
147	6 February 1994	Mariucci Arena; Minneapolis, MN	Minnesota Duluth	5	Minnesota	1	
148	21 October 1994	Duluth Entertainment Convention Center; Duluth, MN	Minnesota	5	Minnesota Duluth	4	
149	22 October 1994	Duluth Entertainment Convention Center; Duluth, MN	Minnesota	6	Minnesota Duluth	2	
150	10 February 1995	Mariucci Arena; Minneapolis, MN	Minnesota	3	Minnesota Duluth	0	
151	11 February 1995	Mariucci Arena; Minneapolis, MN	Minnesota	4	Minnesota Duluth	1	
152	10 March 1995	Mariucci Arena; Minneapolis, MN	Minnesota	5	Minnesota Duluth	4	(OT); WCHA first round game 1
153	11 March 1995	Mariucci Arena; Minneapolis, MN	Minnesota	4	Minnesota Duluth	3	WCHA first round game 2
154	17 November 1995	Duluth Entertainment Convention Center; Duluth, MN	Minnesota	2	Minnesota Duluth	0	
155	18 November 1995	Duluth Entertainment Convention Center; Duluth, MN	Minnesota	7	Minnesota Duluth	0	
156	12 January 1996	Mariucci Arena; Minneapolis, MN	Minnesota	5	Minnesota Duluth	3	
157	13 January 1996	Mariucci Arena; Minneapolis, MN	Minnesota	5	Minnesota Duluth	1	
158	25 October 1996	Duluth Entertainment Convention Center; Duluth, MN	Minnesota Duluth	7	Minnesota	4	
159	26 October 1996	Duluth Entertainment Convention Center; Duluth, MN	Minnesota	4	Minnesota Duluth	3	
160	14 February 1997	Mariucci Arena; Minneapolis, MN	Minnesota Duluth	8	Minnesota	4	
161	15 February 1997	Mariucci Arena; Minneapolis, MN	Minnesota	7	Minnesota Duluth	1	
162	24 October 1997	Duluth Entertainment Convention Center; Duluth, MN	Minnesota Duluth	5	Minnesota	3	
163	25 October 1997	Duluth Entertainment Convention Center; Duluth, MN	Minnesota	5	Minnesota Duluth	1	
164	23 January 1998	Mariucci Arena; Minneapolis, MN	Minnesota	7	Minnesota Duluth	1	
165	24 January 1998	Mariucci Arena; Minneapolis, MN	Minnesota	6	Minnesota Duluth	5	
166	13 March 1998	Duluth Entertainment Convention Center; Duluth, MN	Minnesota Duluth	7	Minnesota	3	WCHA first round game 1
167	14 March 1998	Duluth Entertainment Convention Center; Duluth, MN	Minnesota	5	Minnesota Duluth	0	WCHA first round game 2
168	15 March 1998	Duluth Entertainment Convention Center; Duluth, MN	Minnesota Duluth	5	Minnesota	4	(OT); WCHA first round game 3
169	16 October 1998	Mariucci Arena; Minneapolis, MN	Tie	2	Tie	2	(OT)
170	17 October 1998	Mariucci Arena; Minneapolis, MN	Minnesota	7	Minnesota Duluth	1	
171	26 February 1999	Duluth Entertainment Convention Center; Duluth, MN	Minnesota	4	Minnesota Duluth	1	
172	27 February 1999	Duluth Entertainment Convention Center; Duluth, MN	Minnesota	10	Minnesota Duluth	7	
173	19 November 1999	Mariucci Arena; Minneapolis, MN	Minnesota	5	Minnesota Duluth	3	
174	20 November 1999	Mariucci Arena; Minneapolis, MN	Minnesota	4	Minnesota Duluth	0	
175	4 February 2000	Duluth Entertainment Convention Center; Duluth, MN	Minnesota	3	Minnesota Duluth	2	
176	5 February 2000	Duluth Entertainment Convention Center; Duluth, MN	Minnesota	4	Minnesota Duluth	1	
177	20 October 2000	Mariucci Arena; Minneapolis, MN	No. 6 Minnesota	3	Minnesota Duluth	1	
178	21 October 2000	Mariucci Arena; Minneapolis, MN	No. 6 Minnesota	9	Minnesota Duluth	2	
179	23 February 2001	Duluth Entertainment Convention Center; Duluth, MN	Minnesota Duluth	5	No. 4 Minnesota	4	(OT)
180	24 February 2001	Duluth Entertainment Convention Center; Duluth, MN	No. 4 Minnesota	4	Minnesota Duluth	0	
181	16 November 2001	Mariucci Arena; Minneapolis, MN	No. 1 Minnesota	5	Minnesota Duluth	1	
182	17 November 2001	Mariucci Arena; Minneapolis, MN	No. 1 Minnesota	5	Minnesota Duluth	3	
183	1 February 2002	Duluth Entertainment Convention Center; Duluth, MN	Minnesota Duluth	5	No. 3 Minnesota	2	
184	2 February 2002	Duluth Entertainment Convention Center; Duluth, MN	No. 3 Minnesota	2	Minnesota Duluth	1	
185	21 February 2003	Duluth Entertainment Convention Center; Duluth, MN	No. 6 Minnesota	5	Minnesota Duluth	4	
186	22 February 2003	Duluth Entertainment Convention Center; Duluth, MN	Minnesota Duluth	5	No. 6 Minnesota	4	(OT)
187	24 October 2003	Mariucci Arena; Minneapolis, MN	Minnesota Duluth	4	No. 4 Minnesota	3	(OT)
188	25 October 2003	Mariucci Arena; Minneapolis, MN	Minnesota Duluth	4	No. 4 Minnesota	2	
189	13 February 2004	Duluth Entertainment Convention Center; Duluth, MN	No. 6 Minnesota Duluth	6	No. 4 Minnesota	1	
190	14 February 2004	Duluth Entertainment Convention Center; Duluth, MN	No. 6 Minnesota Duluth	4	No. 4 Minnesota	1	
191	19 March 2004	Xcel Energy Center; Saint Paul, MN	No. 5 Minnesota	7	No. 3 Minnesota Duluth	4	WCHA Final Five
192	28 March 2004	Van Andel Arena; Grand Rapids, MI	No. 5 Minnesota Duluth	3	No. 3 Minnesota	1	NCAA Midwest Regional final
193	28 January 2005	Mariucci Arena; Minneapolis, MN	No. 7 Minnesota	4	Minnesota Duluth	3	
194	29 January 2005	Mariucci Arena; Minneapolis, MN	Minnesota Duluth	3	No. 7 Minnesota	2	
195	4 November 2005	Duluth Entertainment Convention Center; Duluth, MN	Tie	2	Tie	2	(OT)
196	5 November 2005	Duluth Entertainment Convention Center; Duluth, MN	Minnesota Duluth	4	No. 6 Minnesota	3	
197	3 March 2006	Mariucci Arena; Minneapolis, MN	No. 1 Minnesota	7	Minnesota Duluth	0	
198	4 March 2006	Mariucci Arena; Minneapolis, MN	No. 1 Minnesota	2	Minnesota Duluth	0	
199	3 November 2006	Duluth Entertainment Convention Center; Duluth, MN	No. 2 Minnesota	3	Minnesota Duluth	2	
200	4 November 2006	Duluth Entertainment Convention Center; Duluth, MN	No. 2 Minnesota	3	Minnesota Duluth	2	(OT)
201	18 January 2008	Duluth Entertainment Convention Center; Duluth, MN	Tie	1	Tie	1	(OT)
202	19 January 2008	Duluth Entertainment Convention Center; Duluth, MN	Minnesota	2	Minnesota Duluth	1	
203	7 February 2008	Mariucci Arena; Minneapolis, MN	No. 14 Minnesota	4	Minnesota Duluth	1	
204	8 February 2008	Mariucci Arena; Minneapolis, MN	Minnesota Duluth	3	No. 14 Minnesota	2	
205	27 February 2009	Mariucci Arena; Minneapolis, MN	Tie	2	Tie	2	(OT)
206	28 February 2009	Mariucci Arena; Minneapolis, MN	No. 14 Minnesota Duluth	5	Minnesota	3	
207	19 March 2009	Xcel Energy Center; Saint Paul, MN	No. 11 Minnesota Duluth	2	Minnesota	1	WCHA Final Five
208	20 November 2009	Duluth Entertainment Convention Center; Duluth, MN	Minnesota Duluth	4	Minnesota	3	(OT)
209	21 November 2009	Duluth Entertainment Convention Center; Duluth, MN	Minnesota Duluth	3	Minnesota	2	
210	26 February 2010	Mariucci Arena; Minneapolis, MN	Minnesota	3	Minnesota Duluth	2	
211	27 February 2010	Mariucci Arena; Minneapolis, MN	Minnesota Duluth	3	Minnesota	0	
212	10 December 2010	Mariucci Arena; Minneapolis, MN	Minnesota	3	No. 2 Minnesota Duluth	2	
213	12 December 2010	Mariucci Arena; Minneapolis, MN	Tie	2	Tie	2	(OT)
214	4 February 2011	AMSOIL Arena; Duluth, MN	Tie	2	Tie	2	(OT)
215	5 February 2011	AMSOIL Arena; Duluth, MN	No. 4 Minnesota Duluth	6	Minnesota	4	
216	14 October 2011	AMSOIL Arena; Duluth, MN	No. 14 Minnesota	5	No. 9 Minnesota Duluth	4	(OT)
217	15 October 2011	AMSOIL Arena; Duluth, MN	No. 14 Minnesota	5	No. 9 Minnesota Duluth	4	
218	22 February 2013	Mariucci Arena; Minneapolis, MN	No. 2 Minnesota	5	Minnesota Duluth	3	
219	23 February 2013	Mariucci Arena; Minneapolis, MN	Tie	2	Tie	2	(OT); WCHA play ends
220	22 November 2013	Mariucci Arena; Minneapolis, MN	No. 1 Minnesota	6	No. 19 Minnesota Duluth	1	
221	23 November 2013	Mariucci Arena; Minneapolis, MN	No. 19 Minnesota Duluth	6	No. 1 Minnesota	2	
222	25 January 2014	Xcel Energy Center; Saint Paul, MN	Tie	4	Tie	4	(OT); UMD wins shootout; North Star College Cup championship
223	10 October 2014	Compton Family Ice Arena; South Bend, IN	No. 1 Minnesota	4	Minnesota Duluth	3	Ice Breaker Tournament semifinal
224	14 November 2014	Mariucci Arena; Minneapolis, MN	No. 15 Minnesota Duluth	3	No. 1 Minnesota	0	
225	15 November 2014	AMSOIL Arena; Duluth, MN	No. 15 Minnesota Duluth	2	No. 1 Minnesota	1	
226	25 January 2015	Xcel Energy Center; Saint Paul, MN	No. 7 Minnesota Duluth	2	No. 17 Minnesota	1	North Star College Cup consolation game
227	27 March 2015	Verizon Wireless Arena; Manchester, NH	No. 7 Minnesota Duluth	4	No. 10 Minnesota	1	NCAA Midwest Regional semifinal
228	16 November 2015	Mariucci Arena; Minneapolis, MN	No. 7 Minnesota Duluth	3	No. 15 Minnesota	1	
229	17 November 2015	AMSOIL Arena; Duluth, MN	No. 7 Minnesota Duluth	3	No. 15 Minnesota	0	
230	27 January 2017	Xcel Energy Center; Saint Paul, MN	No. 2 Minnesota Duluth	3	No. 6 Minnesota	2	North Star College Cup semifinal
231	6 October 2017	AMSOIL Arena; Duluth, MN	No. 3 Minnesota Duluth	4	No. 12 Minnesota	3	(OT)
232	6 October 2018	AMSOIL Arena; Duluth, MN	Tie	1	Tie	1	(OT)
233	7 October 2018	3M Arena at Mariucci; Minneapolis, MN	No. 13 Minnesota	7	No. 1 Minnesota Duluth	4	
234	25 October 2019	3M Arena at Mariucci; Minneapolis, MN	No. 20 Minnesota Duluth	5	No. 8 Minnesota	2	
235	26 October 2019	AMSOIL Arena; Duluth, MN	No. 20 Minnesota Duluth	2	No. 8 Minnesota	0	
236	22 October 2021	3M Arena at Mariucci; Minneapolis, MN	No. 5 Minnesota Duluth	5	No. 4 Minnesota	3	
237	23 October 2021	AMSOIL Arena; Duluth, MN	No. 5 Minnesota Duluth	2	No. 4 Minnesota	1	
238	3 November 2023	3M Arena at Mariccui; Minneapolis, MN	No.6 Minnesota	5	No.14 Minnesota Duluth	1	
239	4 November 2023	AMSOIL Arena; Duluth, MN	Tie	3	Tie	3	Minnesota Duluth wins in Shootout
240	18 October 2024	AMSOIL Arena; Duluth, MN	No. 6 Minnesota	7	Minnesota Duluth	5	
241	19 October 2024	AMSOIL Arena; Duluth, MN	No. 6 Minnesota	5	Minnesota Duluth	1	
242	24 October 2025	3M Arena at Mariccui; Minneapolis, MN	No. 18 Minnesota Duluth	3	No. 12 Minnesota	0	
243	25 October 2025	3M Arena at Mariccui; Minneapolis, MN	No. 18 Minnesota Duluth	4	No. 12 Minnesota	1	
Series: Minnesota leads 137–87–19

== Series facts ==
Statistic	Minnesota	Minnesota Duluth
Games played	237	
Wins	137	87
Home wins	75	45
Road wins	57	37
Neutral site wins	5	5
Goals scored	972	827
Most goals scored in a game by one team	14 (13 December 1952)	15 (17 December 1972)
Most goals in a game by both teams	18 (17 December 1972 – Minnesota Duluth 15, Minnesota 3)	
Fewest goals in a game by both teams	2 (1995, 2006, 2008, 2018, 2019)	
Fewest goals scored in a game by one team in a win	2 (26 October 2019)	2 (17 November 1995, 4 March 2006)
Most goals scored in a game by one team in a loss	6 (19 January 1985, 10 October 1989)	7 (27 February 1999)
Largest margin of victory	12 (13 December 1952)	12 (17 December 1972)
Longest winning streak	13 (26 October 1974 – 29 October 1976)	8 (14 November 2014 – 6 October 2017)
Longest unbeaten streak	21 (26 October 1974 – 17 November 1978)	9 (14 November 2014 – 6 October 2018)
