= 2018–19 North Dakota Fighting Hawks men's ice hockey season =

- Conference: 5th NCHC
- Home ice: Ralph Engelstad Arena

Rankings
- USCHO.com: 20
- USA Today/ US Hockey Magazine: NR

Record
- Overall: 18-17-2
- Conference: 12-11-1-0
- Home: 12-6-1
- Road: 5-11-1
- Neutral: 1–0–0

Coaches and captains
- Head coach: Brad Berry
- Assistant coaches: Dane Jackson; Matt Shaw; Karl Goehring
- Captain: Colton Poolman
- Alternate captain(s): Nick Jones; Rhett Gardner; Hayden Shaw

The 2018–19 North Dakota Fighting Hawks men's ice hockey season was the 79th season of play for the program and the 6th in the NCHC conference. The Fighting Hawks represented the University of North Dakota and were coached by Brad Berry, in his 4th season.

== Roster ==
As of September 8, 2019.

No.	Nat.	Player	Class	Pos	Height	Weight	DoB	Hometown	Previous team	NHL rights
1		Peter Thome	Sophomore	G	6' 4" (1.93 m)	205 lb (93 kg)	1997-05-24	Minneapolis, Minnesota	Waterloo Black Hawks (USHL)	CBJ, 155th overall 2016
2		Gabe Bast	Sophomore	D	5' 10" (1.78 m)	195 lb (88 kg)	1996-12-20	Red Deer, Alberta	Penticton Vees (BCHL)	—
3		Matt Kiersted	Sophomore	D	6' 0" (1.83 m)	181 lb (82 kg)	1998-04-14	Elk River, Minnesota	Chicago Steel (USHL)	—
4		Andrew Peski	Junior	D	6' 0" (1.83 m)	209 lb (95 kg)	1997-03-11	Ottawa, Ontario	Tri-City Storm (USHL)	—
5		Casey Johnson	Junior	D	6' 2" (1.88 m)	203 lb (92 kg)	1996-04-12	Grand Forks, North Dakota	Dubuque Fighting Saints (USHL)	—
6		Colton Poolman (C)	Junior	D	6' 1" (1.85 m)	195 lb (88 kg)	1995-12-18	East Grand Forks, Minnesota	Penticton Vees (BCHL)	—
7		Zach Yon	Junior	F	6' 0" (1.83 m)	195 lb (88 kg)	1995-12-30	Roseau, Minnesota	Waterloo Black Hawks (USHL)	—
8		Nick Jones (A)	Senior	F	5' 11" (1.8 m)	189 lb (86 kg)	1996-06-02	Edmonton, Alberta	Penticton Vees (BCHL)	—
9		Dixon Bowen	Junior	F	5' 11" (1.8 m)	187 lb (85 kg)	1996-05-05	East Grand Forks, Minnesota	Penticton Vees (BCHL)	—
10		Gavin Hain	Freshman	F	6' 0" (1.83 m)	197 lb (89 kg)	2000-04-03	Grand Rapids, Minnesota	USNTDP (USHL)	PHI, 174th overall 2018
14		Jasper Weatherby	Freshman	F	6' 3" (1.91 m)	206 lb (93 kg)	1998-01-22	Ashland, Oregon	Wenatchee Wild (BCHL)	SJS, 102nd overall 2018
16		Grant Mismash	Sophomore	F	6' 1" (1.85 m)	195 lb (88 kg)	1999-02-19	Edina, Minnesota	USNTDP (USHL)	NSH, 61st overall 2017
17		Jonny Tychonick	Freshman	D	5' 10" (1.78 m)	177 lb (80 kg)	2000-03-03	Calgary, Alberta	Penticton Vees (BCHL)	OTT, 48th overall 2018
18		Collin Adams	Sophomore	F	5' 9" (1.75 m)	188 lb (85 kg)	1998-04-24	Brighton, Michigan	Muskegon Lumberjacks (USHL)	NYI, 170th overall 2016
19		Mark Senden	Freshman	F	5' 9" (1.75 m)	190 lb (86 kg)	1998-01-22	Medina, Minnesota	Fargo Force (USHL)	—
20		Josh Rieger	Sophomore	D	6' 0" (1.83 m)	195 lb (88 kg)	1996-04-02	Regina, Saskatchewan	Estevan Bruins (SJHL)	—
21		Jackson Keane	Freshman	F	5' 9" (1.75 m)	165 lb (75 kg)	1997-04-08	Winnipeg, Manitoba	Penticton Vees (BCHL)	—
22		Rhett Gardner (A)	Senior	F	6' 3" (1.91 m)	207 lb (94 kg)	1996-02-28	Moose Jaw, Saskatchewan	Okotoks Oilers (AJHL)	DAL, 116th overall 2016
24		Jacob Bernard-Docker	Freshman	D	6' 0" (1.83 m)	185 lb (84 kg)	2000-06-30	Canmore, Alberta	Okotoks Oilers (AJHL)	OTT, 26th overall 2018
25		Joel Janatuinen	Senior	F	6' 0" (1.83 m)	189 lb (86 kg)	1995-02-02	Espoo, Finland	Sioux City Musketeers (USHL)	—
26		Cole Smith	Junior	F	6' 3" (1.91 m)	197 lb (89 kg)	1995-12-18	Brainerd, Minnesota	Steinbach Pistons (MJHL)	—
27		Ludvig Hoff	Senior	F	5' 10" (1.78 m)	195 lb (88 kg)	1996-10-16	Oslo, Norway	Lincoln Stars (USHL)	—
28		Hayden Shaw (A)	Senior	D	5' 11" (1.8 m)	198 lb (90 kg)	1996-06-05	Woodbury, Minnesota	Dubuque Fighting Saints (USHL)	—
29		Jordan Kawaguchi	Sophomore	F	5' 9" (1.75 m)	180 lb (82 kg)	1997-05-04	Abbotsford, British Columbia	Chilliwack Chiefs (BCHL)	—
31		Adam Scheel	Freshman	G	6' 3" (1.91 m)	197 lb (89 kg)	1999-05-01	Lakewood, Ohio	Penticton Vees (BCHL)	—
33		Harrison Feeney	Freshman (RS)	G	6' 2" (1.88 m)	220 lb (100 kg)	1998-02-04	Lafayette Hill, Pennsylvania	Lone Star Brahmas (NAHL)	—
35		Ryan Anderson	Senior	G	6' 2" (1.88 m)	205 lb (93 kg)	1995-10-01	Roseau, Minnesota	Minnesota Wilderness (NAHL)	—

== Standings ==
2018–19 National Collegiate Hockey Conference Standings
	Conference record								Overall record					
	GP	W	L	T	3/SW	PTS	GF	GA	GP	W	L	T	GF	GA
#5 St. Cloud State †	24	19	2	3	2	62	94	52	39	30	6	3	156	85
#1 Minnesota Duluth *	24	14	9	1	0	43	75	48	42	29	11	2	133	79
#18 Western Michigan	24	13	10	1	1	41	79	78	37	21	15	1	129	115
#3 Denver	24	11	10	3	3	39	55	56	41	24	12	5	116	83
#20 North Dakota	24	12	11	1	0	37	56	55	37	18	17	2	93	90
Colorado College	24	9	12	3	0	30	66	66	41	17	20	4	117	114
Omaha	24	5	17	2	1	18	53	86	36	9	24	3	90	132
Miami	24	5	17	2	1	18	49	86	38	11	23	4	87	122
Championship: March 23, 2019 † indicates conference regular season champion (Penrose Cup) * indicates conference tournament champion Rankings: USCHO.com Top 20 Poll

== Schedule and results ==
Date	Time	Opponent^{#}	Rank^{#}	Site	TV	Decision	Result	Attendance	Record
Exhibition
October 6	7:07 PM	vs. Manitoba*	#11	Ralph Engelstad Arena • Grand Forks, North Dakota (Exhibition)		Thome	W 3–2 ^{OT}		—
Regular season
October 12	7:07 PM	at Bemidji State*	#13	Sanford Center • Bemidji, Minnesota		Thome	L 1-2	4,107	0-1–0
October 13	7:07 PM	vs. Bemidji State*	#13	Ralph Engelstad Arena • Grand Forks, North Dakota		Scheel	T 1–1 ^{OT}	11,847	0-1-1
October 19	7:37 PM	vs. #7 Minnesota State*	#16	Ralph Engelstad Arena • Grand Forks, North Dakota		Scheel	L 4–7	11,304	0-2-1
October 20	7:07 PM	vs. #7 Minnesota State*	#16	Ralph Engelstad Arena • Grand Forks, North Dakota		Scheel	W 4-3	11,438	1-2-1
October 27	9:00 PM	vs. #5 Minnesota*	#17	Orleans Arena • Las Vegas, Nevada (US Hockey Hall of Fame Game)		Scheel	W 3–1	7,412	2-2-1
November 2	7:37 PM	vs. #16 Wisconsin*	#14	Ralph Engelstad Arena • Grand Forks, North Dakota		Scheel	W 5-0	11,266	3-2-1
November 3	7:07 PM	vs. #16 Wisconsin*	#14	Ralph Engelstad Arena • Grand Forks, North Dakota		Scheel	W 3–2 ^{OT}	11,881	4-2-1
November 9	6:35 PM	at #19 Miami	#11	Steve Cady Arena • Oxford, Ohio		Scheel	W 3-1	2,583	5-2-1 (1–0–0–0)
November 10	7:07 PM	at #19 Miami	#11	Steve Cady Arena • Oxford, Ohio		Scheel	L 2-3	3,011	5-3-1 (1–1–0–0)
November 16	7:37 PM	vs. Western Michigan	#11	Ralph Engelstad Arena • Grand Forks, North Dakota		Thome	L 0-2	11,097	5-4-1 (1-2-0-0)
November 17	7:07 PM	vs. Western Michigan	#11	Ralph Engelstad Arena • Grand Forks, North Dakota		Scheel	L 2-6	11,262	5-5-1 (1-3-0-0)
November 23	7:37 PM	vs. Alaska-Anchorage*	#17	Ralph Engelstad Arena • Grand Forks, North Dakota		Thome	W 5-2	11,155	6-5-1 (1-3-0-0)
November 24	7:07 PM	vs. Alaska-Anchorage*	#17	Ralph Engelstad Arena • Grand Forks, North Dakota		Scheel	W 4-3	11,086	7-5-1 (1-3-0-0)
November 30	7:07 PM	at #2 Minnesota-Duluth	#15	Amsoil Arena • Duluth, Minnesota	FSN+	Thome	L 0-5	6-787	7-6-1 (1-4-0-0)
December 1	7:05 PM	at #2 Minnesota-Duluth	#15	Amsoil Arena • Duluth, Minnesota		Scheel	W 2-1	6,880	8-6-1 (2-4-0-0)
December 7	7:37 PM	vs. #6 Denver	#14	Ralph Engelstad Arena • Grand Forks, North Dakota		Scheel	W 4-1	10,949	9-6-1 (3-4-0-0)
December 8	7:07 PM	vs. #6 Denver	#14	Ralph Engelstad Arena • Grand Forks, North Dakota		Scheel	L 1-2 ^{OT}	11,545	9-7-1 (3-5-0-0)
December 29	6:00 PM	vs. USNTDP*	#13	Ralph Engelstad Arena • Grand Forks, North Dakota (Exhibition)			W 6-2		—
January 4	6:35 PM	at Canisius*	#13	Harbor Center • Buffalo, New York		Scheel	L 1-3	1,511	9-8-1 (3-5-0-0)
January 5	7:07 PM	at Canisius*	#13	Harbor Center • Buffalo, New York		Scheel	L 1-2	1,651	9-9-1 (3-5-0-0)
January 11	7:37 PM	vs. Colorado College		Ralph Engelstad Arena • Grand Forks, North Dakota		Scheel	W 4-3 ^{OT}	11,094	10-9-1 (4-5-0-0)
January 12	7:07 PM	vs. Colorado College		Ralph Engelstad Arena • Grand Forks, North Dakota	FCS	Scheel	W 3-2 ^{OT}	11,720	11-9-1 (5-5-0-0)
January 18	7:07 PM	at Omaha	#20	Baxter Arena • Omaha, Nebraska		Scheel	W 4–3	5,727	12-9-1 (6-5-0-0)
January 19	7:07 PM	at Omaha	#20	Baxter Arena • Omaha, Nebraska		Scheel	L 3-4	7,076	12-10-1 (6-6-0-0)
January 25	7:37 PM	vs. #1 St. Cloud State		Ralph Engelstad Arena • Grand Forks, North Dakota	CBS Sports Network	Scheel	L 1-3	11,608	12-11-1 (6-7-0-0)
January 26	7:07 PM	vs. #1 St. Cloud State		Ralph Engelstad Arena • Grand Forks, North Dakota	FCS	Scheel	W 5-1	11,956	13-11-1 (7-7-0-0)
February 1	8:07 PM	at #7 Denver		Magness Arena • Denver, Colorado		Scheel	L 1–2	6,029	13-12-1 (7-8-0-0)
February 2	8:07 PM	at #7 Denver		Magness Arena • Denver, Colorado		Scheel	T 1-1 ^{OT SOL}	6,254	13-12-2 (7-8-1-0)
February 15	6:37 PM	at #9 Western Michigan		Lawson Ice Arena • Kalamazoo, Michigan	CBS Sports Network	Scheel	W 5–1	3,221	14-12-2 (8-8-1-0)
February 16	6:07 PM	at #9 Western Michigan		Lawson Ice Arena • Kalamazoo, Michigan		Scheel	L 2-4	3,679	14-13-2 (8-9-1-0)
February 22	7:37 PM	vs. #3 Minnesota-Duluth		Ralph Engelstad Arena • Grand Forks, North Dakota	CBS Sports Network	Thome	W 4-1	11,605	15-13-2 (9-9-1-0)
February 23	7:07 PM	vs. #3 Minnesota-Duluth		Ralph Engelstad Arena • Grand Forks, North Dakota		Thome	L 2-3	11,990	15-14-2 (9-10-1-0)
March 1	9:07 PM	at Colorado College	#20	Colorado Springs World Arena • Colorado Springs, Colorado	CBS Sports Network	Thome	L 1-3	3,425	15-15-2 (9-11-1-0)
March 2	7:07 PM	at Colorado College	#20	Colorado Springs World Arena • Colorado Springs, Colorado		Thome	W 1-2	3,476	16-15-2 (10-11-1-0)
March 8	7:37 PM	vs. Omaha	#19	Ralph Engelstad Arena • Grand Forks, North Dakota		Thome	W 2-1	10,776	17-15-2 (11-11-1-0)
March 9	7:07 PM	vs. Omaha	#19	Ralph Engelstad Arena • Grand Forks, North Dakota	FCS	Thome	W 5-4 ^{OT}	10,991	18-15-2 (12-11-1-0)
March 15	8:07 PM	at #8 Denver*	#19	Magness Arena • Denver, Colorado (NCHC Quarterfinals)		Thome	L 0-2	4,378	18-16-2 (12-11-1-0)
March 16	8:07 PM	at #8 Denver*	#19	Magness Arena • Denver, Colorado (NCHC Quarterfinals)		Thome	L 2-4	5,245	18-17-2 (12-11-1-0)
*Non-conference game. ^{#}Rankings from USCHO.com Poll. All times are in Central Time.

== Rankings ==
Poll	Week																							
Poll	Pre	1	2	3	4	5	6	7	8	9	10	11	12	13	14	15	16	17	18	19	20	21	22	23 (Final)
USCHO.com	11	13	16	17	14	11	11	17	15	14	13	13	NR	20	NR	NR	NR	NR	20	19	19	NR	20	20
USA Today	11	13	NR	NR	14	10	10	NR	15	14	13	13	NR	NR	NR	NR	NR	NR	NR	NR	NR	NR	NR	NR
