= Adam Wilcox (ice hockey) =

American ice hockey player

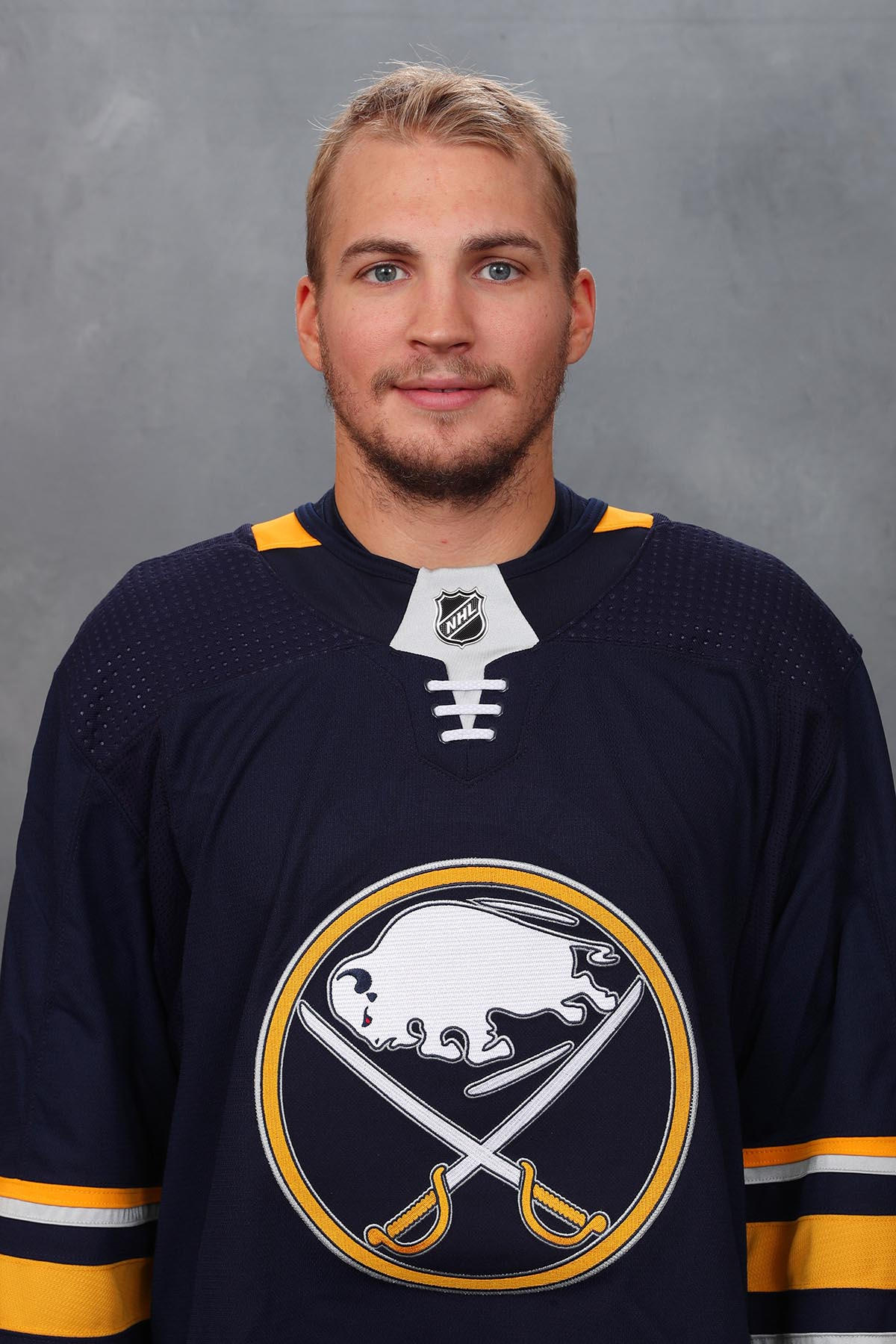
- Wilcox with the Buffalo Sabres in 2018
- Born: November 26, 1992 (age 33) South St. Paul, Minnesota, U.S.
- Height: 6 ft 1 in (185 cm)
- Weight: 185 lb (84 kg; 13 st 3 lb)
- Position: Goaltender
- Caught: Left
- Played for: Buffalo Sabres
- NHL draft: 178th overall, 2011; Tampa Bay Lightning
- Playing career: 2015–2020

Adam Wilcox (born November 26, 1992) is an American former professional ice hockey goaltender. He was selected by the Tampa Bay Lightning in the 6th round (178th overall) of the 2011 NHL entry draft. Wilcox is cousins with former Minnesota Wild goaltender, Alex Stalock. Both Wilcox and Stalock played goaltender for the same high school, South St. Paul.

== Playing career ==
=== Amateur ===
In his sophomore year, Wilcox's outstanding play was rewarded when he was selected as the Big Ten Player of the Year and named to the 2013–14 All-Big Ten First Team.

Wilcox tied Kellen Briggs for the most shutouts in school history (13), with six in his final year with the Gophers. He had the two lowest goals against average in team history. Wilcox had a .932 save percentage as a sophomore in 2013–14, which made him a Hobey Baker Award top-10 finalist, and a top-5 finalist for the inaugural Mike Richter Award. The .932 save percentage is the best in team history. Wilcox's 73 career wins are the most among active NCAA goalies and is tied for third all-time at Minnesota with Hobey Baker Award winner Robb Stauber. Wilcox finishes his college career with a 73-26-14 record (.710) while posting 22 or more wins in all three seasons with the Gophers. Wilcox is a three-time all-conference honoree, and he led the school to three-straight conference titles and three-straight NCAA tournament berths, which included a national championship appearance in 2014. In his final season, Wilcox helped the Gophers win the 2015 Big Ten men's ice hockey tournament and capture the school's first conference playoff title since 2007.

=== Professional ===
On April 1, 2015, it was announced that Wilcox would forego his senior year as he signed a two-year entry-level contract with the Tampa Bay Lightning. Wilcox will finish out the remainder of the season on an ATO with the Syracuse Crunch of the American Hockey League.

During his second season with the Crunch in 2016–17, Wilcox was dealt by the Lightning at the trade deadline to the Florida Panthers in exchange for Mike McKenna on March 1, 2017. Assigned to the Springfield Thunderbirds, Wilcox flourished to play out the season in posting 7 wins in 13 games.

On June 26, 2017, Wilcox was not tendered a qualifying offer as a restricted free agent from the Panthers. On July 1, 2017, Wilcox signed as a free agent to a one-year, two-way contract with the Buffalo Sabres. He was called up by the Sabres on March 30, 2018, following injuries to goaltenders Robin Lehner and Linus Ullmark. Wilcox made his NHL debut during the last game of the Sabres season on April 7, coming in to relieve Chad Johnson. In this game, Wilcox was credited with the loss without being charged with a goal against because he was the goaltender of record when the winning goal, an empty-netter, was scored. He was sent down to the AHL the following day.

As an impending restricted free agent, Wilcox opted to remain within the Sabres organization, agreeing to a one-year AHL contract to continue with the Americans on June 26, 2018. In the following 2018–19 campaign, Wilcox posted 9 wins in 21 games for the Americans, before he was signed to a one-year, two-way contract for the remainder of the season with the Buffalo Sabres on February 24, 2019.

Leaving the Sabres organization after two seasons, Wilcox was signed as a free agent to a one-year AHL contract with the San Antonio Rampage on August 12, 2019. He was invited to participate with the Rampage's NHL affiliate, the St. Louis Blues 2019 training camp, before returning to begin the 2019–20 season with San Antonio.

== Career statistics ==
			Regular season									Playoffs
Season	Team	League	GP	W	L	T/OT	MIN	GA	SO	GAA	SV%	GP	W	L	MIN	GA	SO	GAA	SV%
2010–11	Green Bay Gamblers	USHL	24	16	6	1	1420	52	1	2.20	.922	2	1	0	88	1	0	0.68	.973
2011–12	Green Bay Gamblers	USHL	9	7	2	0	529	20	2	2.27	.912	—	—	—	—	—	—	—	—
2011–12	Tri-City Storm	USHL	34	16	17	1	1896	92	1	2.91	.916	2	0	2	115	9	0	4.70	.842
2012–13	U. of Minnesota	WCHA	39	25	8	5	2331	11	3	1.88	.921	—	—	—	—	—	—	—	—
2013–14	U. of Minnesota	B1G	38	26	6	6	2281	75	4	1.97	.932	—	—	—	—	—	—	—	—
2014–15	U. of Minnesota	B1G	38	22	12	3	2252	91	6	2.42	.912	—	—	—	—	—	—	—	—
2014–15	Syracuse Crunch	AHL	2	0	2	0	113	6	0	3.18	.875	1	0	0	32	1	0	1.86	.933
2015–16	Syracuse Crunch	AHL	27	9	12	8	1455	81	0	3.34	.891	—	—	—	—	—	—	—	—
2016–17	Syracuse Crunch	AHL	34	18	9	6	1842	88	1	2.87	.895	—	—	—	—	—	—	—	—
2016–17	Springfield Thunderbirds	AHL	13	7	4	1	713	24	3	2.02	.932	—	—	—	—	—	—	—	—
2017–18	Rochester Americans	AHL	29	12	7	7	1655	77	0	2.79	.903	—	—	—	—	—	—	—	—
2017–18	Buffalo Sabres	NHL	1	0	1	0	39	0	0	0.00	1.000	—	—	—	—	—	—	—	—
2018–19	Rochester Americans	AHL	28	13	8	5	1531	72	0	2.82	.896	—	—	—	—	—	—	—	—
2019–20	San Antonio Rampage	AHL	22	8	8	4	1224	64	0	3.14	.877	—	—	—	—	—	—	—	—
NHL totals			1	0	1	0	39	0	0	0.00	1.000	—	—	—	—	—	—	—	—

== Awards and honours ==
Award	Year
College
All-WCHA Third Team	2012–13
All-Big Ten First Team	2013–14
Big Ten Player of the Year	2013–14
AHCA West Second-Team All-American	2013–14
North Star College Cup MVP	2014
Big Ten Tournament Most Outstanding Player	2015

Awards and achievements
Preceded by Award Created	Big Ten Player of the Year; 2013–14	Succeeded by Jake Hildebrand
Preceded by Award Created	Big Ten Goaltender of the Year; 2013–14	Succeeded by Jake Hildebrand
Preceded by Award Created	North Star College Cup MVP; 2014	Succeeded by Michael Bitzer
Preceded by Mark Zengerle	Big Ten Tournament MOP; 2015	Succeeded by Kyle Connor
