= Mikey Eyssimont =

American ice hockey player (born 1996)

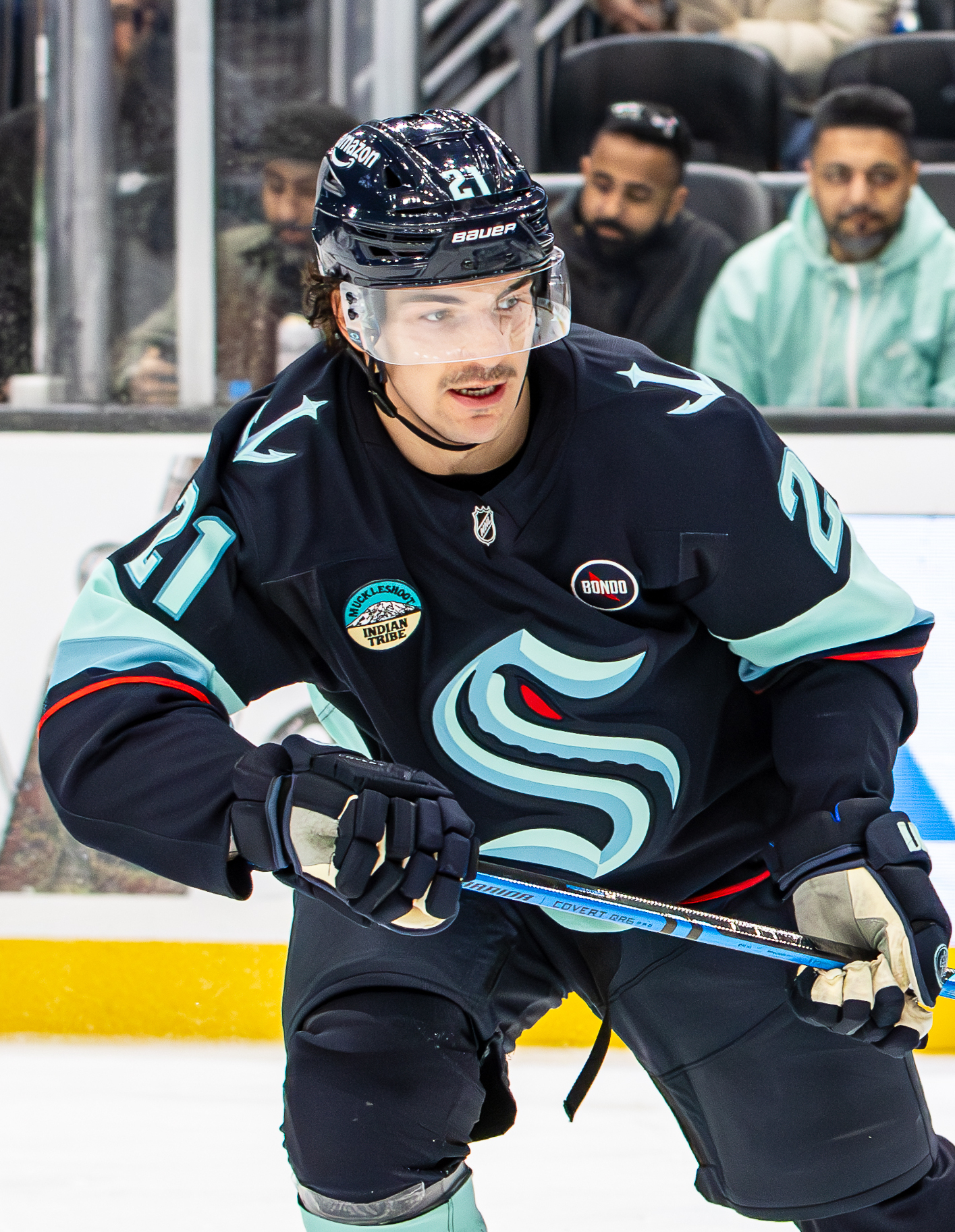
- Eyssimont with the Seattle Kraken in 2025
- Born: September 9, 1996 (age 30) Littleton, Colorado, U.S.
- Height: 6 ft 0 in (183 cm)
- Weight: 201 lb (91 kg; 14 st 5 lb)
- Position: Forward
- Shoots: Left
- NHL team Former teams: Boston Bruins; Winnipeg Jets; San Jose Sharks; Tampa Bay Lightning; Seattle Kraken
- National team: United States
- NHL draft: 142nd overall, 2016; Los Angeles Kings
- Playing career: 2018–present

Michael Eyssimont (born September 9, 1996) is an American professional ice hockey player who is a forward for the Boston Bruins of the National Hockey League (NHL). He was drafted in the fifth round, 142nd overall, by the Los Angeles Kings in the 2016 NHL entry draft.

== Early life ==
Eyssimont was born on September 9, 1996, in Littleton, Colorado, to George and Nancy Eyssimont. He began playing street hockey after being gifted a pair of rollerblades for his fifth birthday. He began playing ice hockey when he was eight and would continue playing roller hockey in the warmer months until he turned 13. Eyssimont spent his minor ice hockey career with the Colorado Thunderbirds of the Tier 1 Elite Hockey League. He led the league in scoring during the 2012–13 season with 48 goals and 43 assists in 40 games.

== Playing career ==
=== Junior ===
After leaving the Thunderbirds, Eyssimont began his junior ice hockey career with the Fargo Force of the United States Hockey League (USHL). During the 2013–14 season, he scored 14 goals and 30 points in 58 games for Fargo. He followed this with 17 goals and 36 points during the 2014–15 season before a March 2015 trade to the Sioux Falls Stampede. After the trade, Eyssimont added another 13 points in 14 regular season games for Sioux Falls. He helped the Stampede capture the 2015 Clark Cup with a team-leading 16 points (seven goals and nine assists) in 19 postseason games.

=== Collegiate ===
Eyssimont committed to play college ice hockey for the St. Cloud State Huskies while he was still playing for the Thunderbirds. Joining the team for the 2015–16 college hockey season, Eyssimont recorded his first NCAA Division I goal on October 31, 2015, when St. Cloud State defeated the Miami RedHawks 3–1. In January, Eyssimont scored three goals in the North Star College Cup and was named the tournament's most valuable player. He was also named the National Collegiate Hockey Conference (NCHC) Offensive Player of the Week and the NCAA Hockey #2 Star of the Week for his performance in the tournament. Eyssimont's North Star performance was part of a month in which he had 14 points in 10 games, and he was named the NCHC Rookie of the Month for his performance. Eyssimont scored the game-winning goal in St. Cloud State's 3–1 defeat of the Minnesota Duluth Bulldogs at the 2016 NCHC Tournament, giving the Huskies their first ever tournament championship. He was named both the NCHC Frozen Faceoff MVP and a member of the All-Tournament team. The Huskies then advanced to the 2016 NCAA Division I Men's Ice Hockey Tournament, where they were eliminated by Ferris State in the West Regional. Eyssimont finished his freshman season with 14 goals and 33 points. That June, the Los Angeles Kings of the National Hockey League (NHL) selected him in the fifth round, 142nd overall, of the 2016 NHL entry draft.

As a sophomore during the 2016–17 college hockey season, Eyssimont had 14 goals and 30 points in 36 games. Prior to the 2017–18 season, Eyssimont suffered medical issues caused by dietary sensitivities. After being hospitalized for these issues, he adopted a gluten- and dairy-free diet. After overcoming the illness, Eyssimont scored 21 points in his first 19 games with St. Cloud, and he picked up in the final stretch of the season. He finished his junior season with 17 goals and 39 points in 39 games. In 115 games across three seasons of college ice hockey, Eyssimont finished with 45 goals and 57 assists.

=== Professional ===
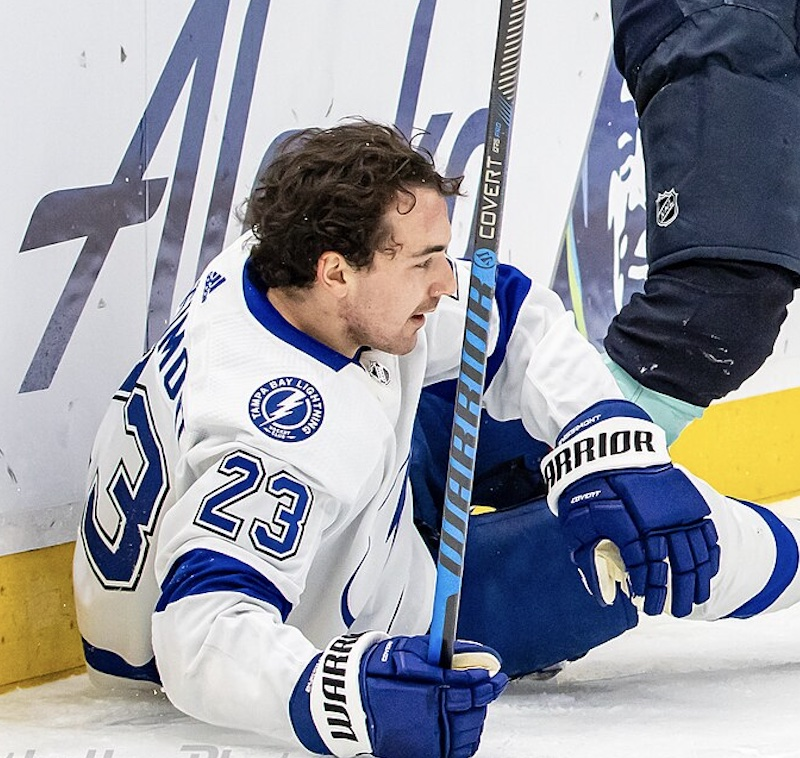
Eyssimont with the Tampa Bay Lightning in 2023.

After the Huskies were eliminated from the 2018 NCAA tournament, Eyssimont signed a two-year entry-level contract with the Kings. He spent those two seasons with the Ontario Reign, the Kings' American Hockey League (AHL) affiliate, where he recorded 22 goals and 49 points in 122 games. On October 5, 2020, Eyssimont signed a one-year contract extension with the Los Angeles club.

On July 28, 2021, the Winnipeg Jets signed Eyssimont to a two-year, two-way contract worth $1.5 million. He was assigned to the Manitoba Moose, the Jets' AHL affiliate, to begin the season. After scoring 15 goals and 35 points in 35 games for the Moose during the 2021–22 season, Eyssimont was promoted to the NHL on April 11 as a fill-in for the injured Blake Wheeler. He was sent back down to the Moose on April 17.

During the 2022–23 season, on November 6, 2022, Eyssimont was promoted to the NHL by the Jets after recording nine points in as many games. Eyssimont remained on the Jets roster, featuring in 19 games and contributing with one goal and four assists, before he was placed on waivers by the Jets and subsequently claimed by the San Jose Sharks on January 6, 2023. On March 1, the Sharks traded Eyssimont to the Tampa Bay Lightning in exchange for Vladislav Namestnikov. On April 27, Eyssimount picked up his first playoff point versus the Toronto Maple Leafs.

After recording 5 goals and 10 points through 57 regular season games during the 2024–25 season, on March 5, 2025, Eyssimont was traded to the Seattle Kraken alongside two conditional first-round draft picks and a second-round pick as part of a three-team deal, which saw the Lightning receive Kyle Aucoin, Oliver Bjorkstrand, Yanni Gourde, and a fifth-round draft pick, while the Detroit Red Wings received a fourth-round pick for retaining half of Gourde's salary.

Having concluded his contract with the Kraken, Eyssimont left as a free agent and was signed to a two-year, $2.9 million contract with the Boston Bruins on July 1, 2025. Eyssimont appeared in 56 games for the Bruins, scoring 8 goals and 10 assists. He went scoreless in two playoff games for the team.

On October 4, 2026, the Bruins placed Eyssimont on waivers, which he cleared, starting his season with their AHL affiliate, the Providence Bruins. Eyssimont immediately went on a tear for the team, scoring a hat-trick in his second game. Two games later, he would score another hat trick, scoring a total of seven goals in four games. Although he went scoreless in the next game, he followed it up with three straight multi-point games, including a third hat trick. A day after his third hat trick, Eyssimont was reward with a call-up to the NHL team as a result of an injury to James Hagens. At the time of his call-up, Eyssimont had score 13 goals and three assists for 16 points in eight games, leading the AHL in goals. Eyssimont immediately made an impact in Boston, scoring the game-winning goal in his first game back.

== International play ==
Medal record

Representing United States

Ice hockey

World Championships
Gold medal – first place	2025 Sweden/Denmark	

Eyssimont represented the United States at the 2025 IIHF World Championship, where he recorded one goal and two assists in nine games and helped Team USA win their first gold medal since 1933.

== Personal life ==
Eyssimont has a twin sister named Anastasia who competed in gymnastics as a youth before suffering a career-ending elbow injury. After being diagnosed with Crohn's disease while attending St. Cloud State, Eyssimont has become involved with charity organizations offering support for the disease.

== Career statistics ==
=== Regular season and playoffs ===
			Regular season					Playoffs
Season	Team	League	GP	G	A	Pts	PIM	GP	G	A	Pts	PIM
2012–13	Colorado Thunderbirds 16U AAA	T1EHL 16U	24	19	16	35	24	—	—	—	—	—
2012–13	Fargo Force	USHL	4	0	0	0	0	—	—	—	—	—
2013–14	Fargo Force	USHL	58	14	16	30	64	—	—	—	—	—
2014–15	Fargo Force	USHL	46	17	19	36	46	—	—	—	—	—
2014–15	Sioux Falls Stampede	USHL	14	5	8	13	16	12	7	9	16	20
2015–16	St. Cloud State University	NCHC	40	14	19	33	20	—	—	—	—	—
2016–17	St. Cloud State University	NCHC	36	14	16	30	20	—	—	—	—	—
2017–18	St. Cloud State University	NCHC	39	17	22	39	30	—	—	—	—	—
2017–18	Ontario Reign	AHL	3	0	1	1	0	—	—	—	—	—
2018–19	Ontario Reign	AHL	63	10	10	20	47	—	—	—	—	—
2019–20	Ontario Reign	AHL	56	12	16	28	70	—	—	—	—	—
2020–21	Ontario Reign	AHL	40	9	8	17	49	1	1	1	2	0
2021–22	Manitoba Moose	AHL	58	18	24	42	90	5	1	0	1	4
2021–22	Winnipeg Jets	NHL	1	0	0	0	0	—	—	—	—	—
2022–23	Manitoba Moose	AHL	9	2	7	9	27	—	—	—	—	—
2022–23	Winnipeg Jets	NHL	19	1	4	5	7	—	—	—	—	—
2022–23	San Jose Sharks	NHL	20	3	5	8	34	—	—	—	—	—
2022–23	Tampa Bay Lightning	NHL	15	1	1	2	22	3	1	1	2	0
2023–24	Tampa Bay Lightning	NHL	81	11	14	25	104	5	0	0	0	2
2024–25	Tampa Bay Lightning	NHL	57	5	5	10	44	—	—	—	—	—
2024–25	Seattle Kraken	NHL	20	4	2	6	19	—	—	—	—	—
2025–26	Boston Bruins	NHL	56	8	10	18	31	2	0	0	0	0
NHL totals			269	33	41	74	261	10	1	1	2	2

=== International ===
Year	Team	Event	Result	GP	G	A	Pts	PIM
2023	United States	WC	4th	9	1	2	3	29
2024	United States	WC	5th	8	1	0	1	0
2025	United States	WC	1st place, gold medalist(s)	9	1	2	3	4
Senior totals				26	3	4	7	33

== Awards and honors ==
Award	Year	Ref
College
North Star College Cup Most Valuable Player	2016	
NCHC Frozen Faceoff Most Valuable Player	2016	
NCHC Frozen Faceoff All-Tournament Team	2016	

Awards and achievements
Preceded by Blake Coleman	NCHC Tournament MVP; 2016	Succeeded by Alex Iafallo
