= North Star College Cup =

Men's ice hockey tournament

- Sport: College ice hockey
- Founded: 2014
- Venue: Xcel Energy Center (2014–2017)
- Most recent champion: Minnesota Duluth
- Most titles: Bemidji State (1); Minnesota (1); Minnesota Duluth (1); St. Cloud State (1)

The North Star College Cup was a men's ice hockey tournament among the five NCAA Division I programs in Minnesota. The North Star College Cup was meant to maintain the long-standing rivalries among the Minnesota schools from when they competed together in the Classic WCHA up until the 2013–2014 season.

== Format ==
The competitors are:

- University of Minnesota Golden Gophers
- Minnesota State University Mavericks
- University of Minnesota Duluth Bulldogs
- St. Cloud State University Huskies
- Bemidji State University Beavers

The tournament lasts two rounds, with first-round opponents being rotated from year to year. The second round features the consolation game and the championship game. The University of Minnesota is the only permanent participant. The other four schools each rotate a year off.

== History ==
Prior to the 2013–2014 season, all the schools competed in the WCHA. However, several teams realigned their conference affiliations in 2013, after Minnesota joined the Big Ten. St. Cloud State and the University of Minnesota Duluth joined the NCHC. Minnesota State and Bemidji State remain together in what has been coined the “new-look WCHA”. The tournament is meant to maintain the rivalries among the Minnesota schools from the Classic WCHA.

The inaugural tournament was held at the Xcel Energy Center in St. Paul, Minnesota on January 24–25, 2014. Participating were the University of Minnesota, University of Minnesota Duluth, Minnesota State University, Mankato and St. Cloud State University.

== Trophy ==
The trophy consists of Minnesota-grown red oak and birch, as well as hickory wood historically used to make hockey sticks. Doug Johannsen of Ramsey, Minnesota crafted the cup, while Bill Durand of Anoka, Minnesota constructed the base. A star is used between the cup and the base and shows the tournament logo on top of the base. The star includes acrylic color in addition to pucks for each individual school participating in the tournament. Sterling Trophy Inc. designed the cup and approached Johannsen and Durand to create the trophy, and laser engraved the tournament logo onto the cup as part of the final production.

== Results ==
Four games are listed for each North Star College Cup, in the order they were played. Winners are listed in bold. Games requiring overtime are indicated by (OT). Games requiring a shoot out are indicated by (SO) and the shootout score (3–2).

Year	First Game	Second Game	Consolation	Final
2014	MSU 4–5 (OT) **UMD**	**#1 UM** 4–1 #5 SCSU	**#5 SCSU** 6–4 MSU	**#1 UM** 4–4 (SO 2-0) UMD
2015	**BSU** 4–0 #7 UMD	**#1 MSU** 4–2 #17 UM	**#7 UMD** 2–1 #17 UM	**BSU** 3–1 #1 MSU
2016	#19 MSU 4–5 **#3 SCSU**	**BSU** 4–2 #20 UM	**#19 MSU** 3–2 #20 UM	**#3 SCSU** 5–2 BSU
2017	**SCSU** 2–1 #20 BSU	**#2 UMD** 3–2 #6 UM	#20 BSU 0–4 #6 **UM**	**#2 UMD** 2–1 (OT) SCSU

== Statistics ==
Through the 2017 North Star College Cup, the five teams have amassed the following statistics:

School	W	L	Pct.	GF	GA	North Star Cup Finishes			
School	W	L	Pct.	GF	GA	1st	2nd	3rd	4th
**St. Cloud State**	4	2	.667	20	17	1	1	1	0
**Minnesota–Duluth**	4	2	.667	16	16	1	1	1	0
**Bemidji State**	3	3	.500	14	14	1	1	0	1
**Minnesota**	3	5	.375	21	21	1	0	1	2
**Minnesota State**	2	4	.333	20	23	0	1	1	1

=== Awards ===
Champions
Year	School	Coach
2014	**Minnesota**	Don Lucia
2015	**Bemidji State**	Tom Serratore
2016	**St. Cloud State**	Bob Motzko
2017	**Minnesota–Duluth**	Scott Sandelin

Most Valuable Players
Year	Name	Position	School	Ref
2014	Adam Wilcox	Goaltender	**Minnesota**	
2015	Michael Bitzer	Goaltender	**Bemidji State**	
2016	Mikey Eyssimont	Forward	**St. Cloud State**	
2017	Hunter Miska	Goaltender	**Minnesota–Duluth**	

== See also ==
- College Hockey
- College Rivalry
- Minnesota High School Boys Hockey
