= Cole Koepke =

American ice hockey player (born 1998)

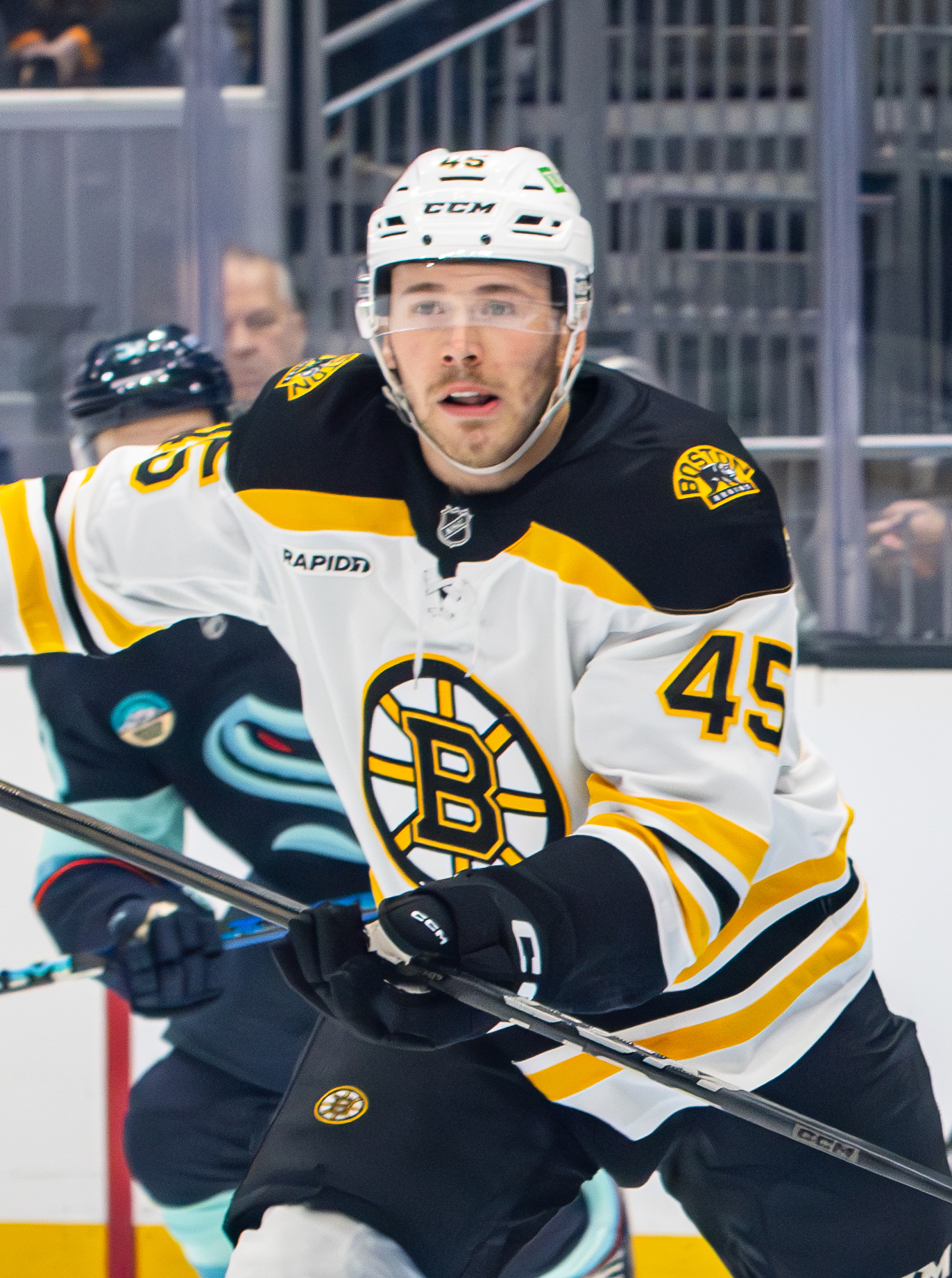
- Koepke with the Boston Bruins in 2024
- Born: May 17, 1998 (age 28) Two Harbors, Minnesota, U.S.
- Height: 6 ft 1 in (185 cm)
- Weight: 196 lb (89 kg; 14 st 0 lb)
- Position: Left wing
- Shoots: Left
- NHL team Former teams: Winnipeg Jets; Tampa Bay Lightning; Boston Bruins
- NHL draft: 183rd overall, 2018; Tampa Bay Lightning
- Playing career: 2021–present

Cole Tyler Koepke (born May 17, 1998) is an American professional ice hockey player who is a left winger for the Winnipeg Jets of the National Hockey League (NHL). As a member of the Sioux City Musketeers, Koepke was drafted 183rd overall by the Tampa Bay Lightning in the 2018 NHL entry draft. He then played three seasons with the Minnesota Duluth Bulldogs men's ice hockey team before joining the Lightning organization.

== Early life ==
Koepke was born on May 17, 1998, in Two Harbors, Minnesota, U.S to parents Jim and Julie Koepke. He began playing ice hockey after watching his older brother Travis play the sport. As a student at Hermantown High School, Koepke played defence on their varsity soccer team. He also served as a senior assistant team captain as the hockey team captured the 2015–16 Minnesota State High School Class A title. During the tournament, he scored four goals and two assists in their 11–3 quarterfinals win and finished their state championship run with 11 total points.

== Playing career ==
Following high school, Koepke joined the Sioux City Musketeers of the United States Hockey League (USHL) for two seasons and served as an assistant captain for one. He played 22 games as a rookie, recording five points and time on the penalty kill and the power play, before being sidelined due to a knee injury. Early in the 2017–18 season, Koepke signed a letter of intent with the University of Minnesota Duluth. Leading up to the 2018 NHL entry draft, Koepke was ranked 215th among North American skaters by the NHL Central Scouting Bureau. He concluded the season with 28 goals and 39 points in 60 games and was eventually drafted in the sixth round, 183rd overall, by the Tampa Bay Lightning. Following the draft, Koepke was invited to participate in their Development Camp.

=== Collegiate ===
Koepke joined the Minnesota Duluth Bulldogs men's ice hockey team as a rookie for their 2018–19 NCAA season. During the season, he often skated on the left wing on a line with Parker Mackay and Justin Richards who helped him record 19 points. At the conclusion of the season, Koepke helped the Bulldogs captured their second-consecutive national championship. The following season, Koepke reigned as the National Collegiate Hockey Conference (NCHC) leader in goals and completed his sophomore season riding a 10-game scoring streak. He ended his sophomore campaign with 33 points in 34 games and earned first-team all-NCHC and second-team All-American honors.

Koepke returned to the Bulldogs for the 2020–21 NCAA season and served as an assistant captain. During his junior season, Koepke lead the team in shots with 115 and finished second on the team in goals. He helped the Bulldogs return to the NCAA Frozen Four, recording one goal, as the team lost in the semi finals to the eventual champions the University of Massachusetts Minutemen. At the conclusion of the season, Koepke was again named to the first-team all-NCHC and a Hobey Baker Award nominee.

=== Professional ===
==== Tampa Bay Lightning ====
Koepke officially concluded his collegiate career by signing a two-year entry-level contract with the Lightning on April 13, 2021. Following the signing, he joined their American Hockey League (AHL) affiliate, the Syracuse Crunch, for the remainder of the season. In his second game with the Crunch, Koepke scored his first professional goal in a 7–1 win over the Utica Comets.

On October 11, 2022, Koepke made his NHL debut with the Lightning. Koepke skated on the Lightning's third line in a loss to the New York Rangers at Madison Square Garden. Koepke continued to play fourth-line minutes after his call-up, eventually scoring his first career goal on November 13, against the Washington Capitals. It would be the only point he would score in his first NHL stint before being sent back to the Crunch for the rest of the season.

Koepke started the season in the AHL to start the 2023–24 season, but was called up shortly into the season. Following the on-ice death of his friend Adam Johnson on October 28, 2023, Koepke opted to wear a neck guard. Koepke would once again spend most of the season in the AHL. In total, he had two assists in nine games at the NHL level.

==== Boston Bruins ====
Following four seasons within the Lightning organization, Koepke left as a free agent and was signed to a one-year, two-way contract with the Boston Bruins on July 1, 2024.

After an impressive pre-season, Koepke made the opening night NHL roster for the Bruins to start the 2024–25 season, the first time in his career. In the second game of the season, Koepke had his first career multi-point game, scoring a goal and two assists against the Montreal Canadiens. After three goals and four assists in the first 11 games of the season, it was clear that Koepke had earned a permanent spot on the NHL roster, and played his first full NHL season. On March 8, 2025, Koepke had his first multi-goal game, scoring two goals against his former team, the Lightning. Overall, Koepke scored ten goals and seven assists in 73 games for the Bruins, however, they missed the playoffs.

==== Winnipeg Jets ====
As a free agent at the conclusion of his contract with the Bruins, Koepke agreed to terms on a one-year, $1 million contract with the Winnipeg Jets for the 2025–26 season on July 1, 2025.

== Career statistics ==
			Regular season					Playoffs
Season	Team	League	GP	G	A	Pts	PIM	GP	G	A	Pts	PIM
2013–14	Hermantown High	USHS	25	17	11	28	12	3	0	2	2	0
2014–15	Hermantown High	USHS	25	17	19	36	12	3	3	3	6	0
2015–16	Hermantown High	USHS	24	31	22	53	23	3	4	0	4	0
2015–16	Minnesota Wilderness	NAHL	9	2	1	3	4	8	0	0	0	4
2016–17	Sioux City Musketeers	USHL	22	3	2	5	19	—	—	—	—	—
2017–18	Sioux City Musketeers	USHL	60	28	11	39	34	—	—	—	—	—
2018–19	U. of Minnesota-Duluth	NCHC	42	7	12	19	14	—	—	—	—	—
2019–20	U. of Minnesota-Duluth	NCHC	34	16	17	33	16	—	—	—	—	—
2020–21	U. of Minnesota-Duluth	NCHC	28	15	8	23	22	—	—	—	—	—
2020–21	Syracuse Crunch	AHL	9	2	1	3	2	—	—	—	—	—
2021–22	Syracuse Crunch	AHL	69	20	19	39	55	5	2	1	3	0
2022–23	Tampa Bay Lightning	NHL	17	1	0	1	2	—	—	—	—	—
2022–23	Syracuse Crunch	AHL	52	7	12	19	23	5	0	3	3	2
2023–24	Syracuse Crunch	AHL	53	20	19	39	14	8	4	0	4	0
2023–24	Tampa Bay Lightning	NHL	9	0	2	2	0	—	—	—	—	—
2024–25	Boston Bruins	NHL	73	10	7	17	17	—	—	—	—	—
2025–26	Winnipeg Jets	NHL	66	8	9	17	16	—	—	—	—	—
NHL totals			165	19	18	37	35	—	—	—	—	—
