= Jordan Greenway =

American ice hockey player (born 1997)

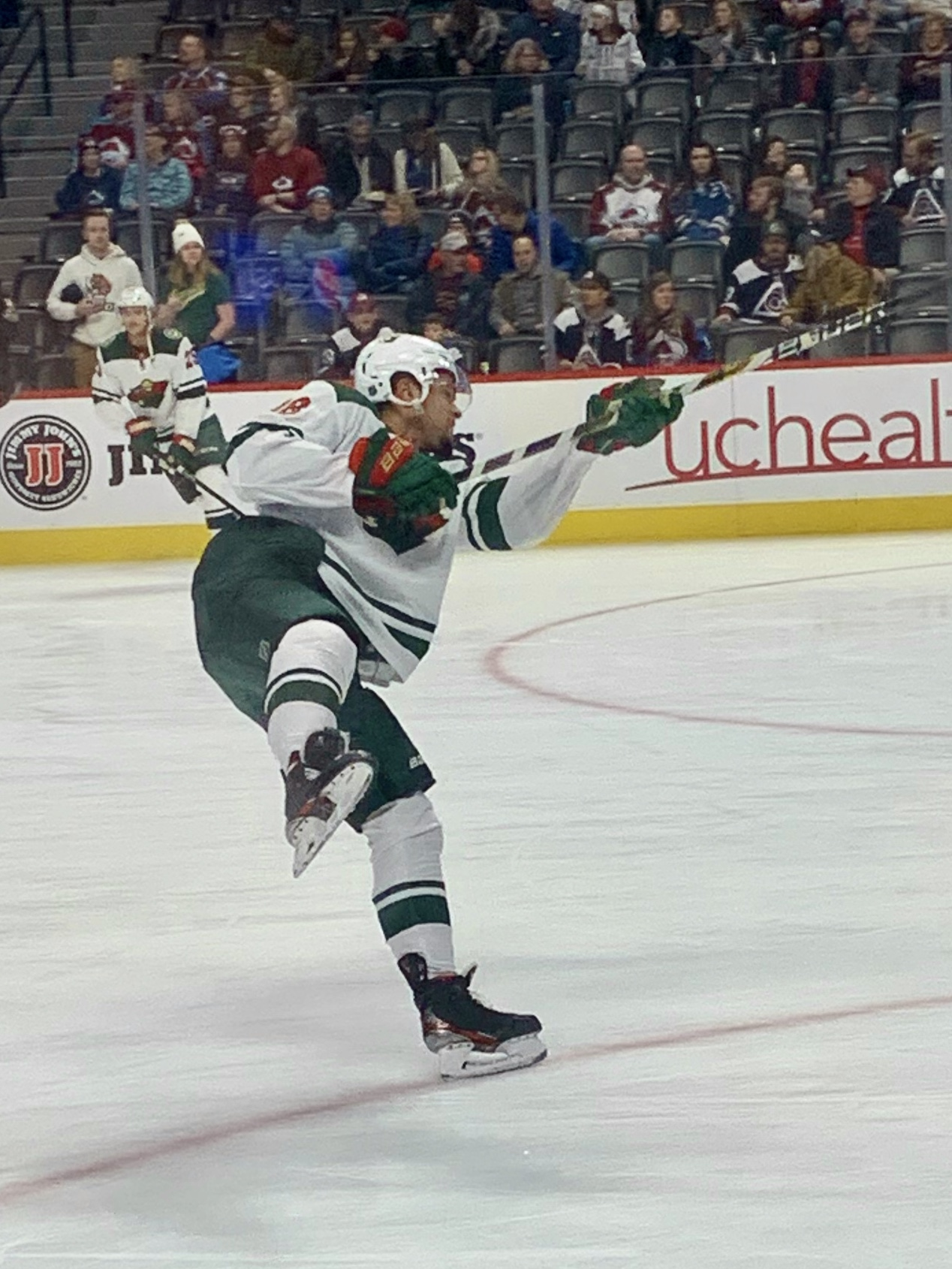
- Greenway with the Minnesota Wild in 2019
- Born: February 16, 1997 (age 29) Canton, New York, U.S.
- Height: 6 ft 6 in (198 cm)
- Weight: 231 lb (105 kg; 16 st 7 lb)
- Position: Forward
- Shoots: Left
- NHL team Former teams: Chicago Blackhawks; Minnesota Wild; Buffalo Sabres
- National team: United States
- NHL draft: 50th overall, 2015; Minnesota Wild
- Playing career: 2017–present

Jordan Greenway (born February 16, 1997) is an American professional ice hockey player who is a forward for the Chicago Blackhawks of the National Hockey League (NHL). He was selected by the Minnesota Wild in the second round (50th overall) in the 2015 NHL entry draft. He has also played for the Buffalo Sabres.

Internationally, Greenway has represented the United States at the 2017 IIHF World Championship and 2018 Winter Olympics, becoming the first African-American named to a US Olympic ice hockey roster.

== Playing career ==
Born in Canton, New York, Greenway began playing hockey as a child living in Potsdam, New York before going on to play high school hockey in Minnesota at Shattuck-Saint Mary's and eventually joining the USA Hockey National Team Development Program (U.S. NTDP). As a member of the U.S. NTDP, he played the 2013–14 and 2014–15 seasons in the United States Hockey League (USHL). Greenway's outstanding play was rewarded when he was invited to skate in the 2014 CCM/USA Hockey All-American Prospects Game.

After his selection by the Wild in the NHL entry draft, Greenway played his freshman season for the Boston University Terriers in the 2015–16 season. In his Junior year, Greenway was selected to the Hockey East Third All-Star Team after reaching the 30-point mark for the second season. Greenway was also named to the Hockey East All-Tournament Team after the 2018 Hockey East Men's Ice Hockey Tournament along with teammates Jake Oettinger and Chad Krys. On March 26, 2018, he signed a three-year entry-level contract with the Minnesota Wild. Greenway made his NHL debut the following day in a 2–1 loss to the Nashville Predators. Greenway played his first career NHL playoff game in Game 1 of the 2018 Stanley Cup playoffs against the Winnipeg Jets. By doing so, Greenway became the first player to play in the Olympic Games, an NCAA tournament, and the Stanley Cup playoffs within the same season. Greenway scored his first career NHL goal in the playoffs, in a 6–2 win over the Winnipeg Jets on April 15.

Greenway began the 2018–19 season in the NHL but was reassigned to the American Hockey League after nine games to further his development. The day following his demotion, Greenway recorded a hat trick in a 6–1 win over the Colorado Eagles. Following his second AHL game, Greenway was recalled back to the NHL. On October 29, in his first NHL game following his recall, Greenway scored his first regular season goal in a 5–2 loss to the Vancouver Canucks.

On January 31, 2022, the Wild signed Greenway to a three-year, $9 million contract extension.

In the 2022–23 season, Greenway was in the midst of his worst statistical year, registering only 2 goals and 7 points through 45 regular season games, before he was dealt at the NHL trade deadline by the Wild to the Buffalo Sabres in exchange for two draft picks on March 3, 2023.

On June 23, 2026, the Sabres traded Greenway and Bowen Byram to the Chicago Blackhawks in exchange for Louis Crevier, the 4th, and the 45th overall pick in the 2026 NHL entry draft.

== International play ==
Medal record

Representing United States

Ice hockey

World Junior Championships
Gold medal – first place	2017 Canada	

IIHF World U18 Championship
Gold medal – first place	2015 Switzerland	

World U-17 Hockey Challenge
Gold medal – first place	2014 Canada	

Greenway first represented the United States in helping capture a gold medal at the 2014 World U-17 Hockey Challenge. He also won a gold medal as a member of Team USA at the 2015 IIHF World U18 Championships.

At the conclusion of his sophomore season with the Terriers, Greenway was named to the senior United States team for the 2017 IIHF World Championship in Germany and France.

On January 1, 2018, Greenway was selected to compete at the 2018 Winter Olympics, becoming the first African-American named to a US Olympic hockey roster.

== Personal life ==
His younger brother, James, was drafted 72nd overall by the Toronto Maple Leafs in the 2016 NHL entry draft. He has a younger half-sister Maria.

== Career statistics ==
=== Regular season and playoffs ===
			Regular season					Playoffs
Season	Team	League	GP	G	A	Pts	PIM	GP	G	A	Pts	PIM
2012–13	Shattuck–Saint Mary's AAA	Midget	46	23	39	62	96	—	—	—	—	—
2013–14	U.S. NTDP Juniors	USHL	33	10	16	26	61	—	—	—	—	—
2013–14	U.S. NTDP U17	USDP	52	16	25	41	116	—	—	—	—	—
2014–15	U.S. NTDP Juniors	USHL	22	5	15	20	16	—	—	—	—	—
2014–15	U.S. NTDP U18	USDP	53	9	34	43	50	—	—	—	—	—
2015–16	Boston University	HE	39	5	21	26	58	1	0	1	1	0
2016–17	Boston University	HE	37	10	21	31	82	2	0	1	1	4
2017–18	Boston University	HE	36	13	22	35	52	—	—	—	—	—
2017–18	Minnesota Wild	NHL	6	0	1	1	0	5	1	1	2	0
2018–19	Minnesota Wild	NHL	81	12	12	24	29	—	—	—	—	—
2018–19	Iowa Wild	AHL	5	3	3	6	0	11	0	5	5	16
2019–20	Minnesota Wild	NHL	67	8	20	28	54	4	0	0	0	8
2020–21	Minnesota Wild	NHL	56	6	26	32	49	7	1	2	3	2
2021–22	Minnesota Wild	NHL	62	10	17	27	69	6	1	1	2	6
2022–23	Minnesota Wild	NHL	45	2	5	7	26	—	—	—	—	—
2022–23	Buffalo Sabres	NHL	17	4	0	4	0	—	—	—	—	—
2023–24	Buffalo Sabres	NHL	67	10	18	28	64	—	—	—	—	—
2024–25	Buffalo Sabres	NHL	34	3	5	8	45	—	—	—	—	—
2025–26	Buffalo Sabres	NHL	40	1	5	6	29	13	2	1	3	6
NHL totals			475	56	109	165	365	35	5	5	10	22

=== International ===
Year	Team	Event	Result	GP	G	A	Pts	PIM
2014	United States	U17	1st place, gold medalist(s)	6	3	2	5	12
2015	United States	WJC18	1st place, gold medalist(s)	7	1	6	7	4
2017	United States	WJC	1st place, gold medalist(s)	7	3	5	8	2
2017	United States	WC	5th	8	0	0	0	0
2018	United States	OG	7th	5	1	0	1	10
Junior totals				20	7	13	20	18
Senior totals				13	1	0	1	10

== Awards and honors ==
Award	Year
USHL
CCM/USA Hockey All-American Prospects Game	2014
International
World U-17 Hockey Challenge gold medal	2014
IIHF World U18 Championship gold medal	2015
IIHF World U20 Championship gold medal	2017
College
All-Hockey East Third All-Star Team	2018
Hockey East All-Tournament Team	2018
