= 2018 Hockey East men's ice hockey tournament =

2018 Hockey East Men's ice hockey tournament
- Dates: March 2–17, 2018
- Teams: 11
- Finals site: TD Garden; Boston, Massachusetts
- Champions: Boston University (9th title)
- Winning coach: David Quinn (2nd title)
- Hockey East Men's Ice Hockey Tournaments

The 2018 Hockey East Men's Ice Hockey Tournament was the 34th tournament in the history of the conference. It was played between March 2 and March 17, 2018 at campus locations and at the TD Garden in Boston, Massachusetts. Boston University won their 9th tournament and earned Hockey East's automatic bid into the 2018 NCAA Division I Men's Ice Hockey Tournament.

== Format ==
The tournament included all eleven teams in the conference. Seeds 1–5 earned a first-round bye, and seeds 6–11 played a best-of-three Opening Round played on campus locations. Winners advanced to play the 1–3 seeds in the best-of-three Quarterfinals on campus locations. Winners of those series played in a single-game Semifinal, and those winners faced off in a single-game Championship Final, both at the TD Garden.

=== Regular season standings ===
Note: GP = Games played; W = Wins; L = Losses; T = Ties; PTS = Points; GF = Goals For; GA = Goals Against

2017–18 Hockey East men's standings
	Conference record							Overall record					
	GP	W	L	T	PTS	GF	GA	GP	W	L	T	GF	GA
#19 Boston College†	24	18	6	0	36	79	53	37	20	14	3	108	99
#11 Northeastern	24	15	6	3	33	79	49	38	23	10	5	136	81
#7 Providence	24	13	7	4	30	70	50	40	24	12	4	117	85
#10 Boston University*	24	12	8	4	28	72	60	40	22	14	4	124	105
Connecticut	24	11	12	1	23	70	62	36	15	19	2	100	102
Maine	24	10	11	3	23	65	74	38	18	16	4	117	115
Massachusetts–Lowell	24	11	13	0	22	68	75	36	17	19	0	101	99
Massachusetts	24	9	13	2	20	60	74	39	17	20	2	104	119
Vermont	24	6	12	6	18	51	75	37	10	20	7	79	112
Merrimack	24	7	15	2	16	51	70	37	12	21	4	83	105
New Hampshire	24	5	14	5	15	48	71	36	10	20	6	88	104
Championship: March 17, 2018 † indicates conference regular season champion; * indicates conference tournament champion Rankings: USCHO.com Top 20 Poll; updated March 1, 2018

== Bracket ==
Teams are reseeded after the Opening Round and Quarterfinals

Opening Round; March 1–4
6	Maine	4	3	–
11	New Hampshire	1	2	–
7	Massachusetts–Lowell	1	2	–
10	Merrimack	2*	3*	–
8	Massachusetts	3*	3	5
9	Vermont	2	4*	1

Quarterfinals; March 9–11
1	Boston College	1	4*	–
10	Merrimack	0	3	–
2	Northeastern	3	7	–
8	Massachusetts	2	2	–
3	Providence	4	3	–
6	Maine	3	2	–
4	Boston University	5*	2	–
5	Connecticut	4	1	–

Semifinals; March 16
1	Boston College	3
4	Boston University	4*
2	Northeastern	2
3	Providence	3*

Championship; March 17
3	Providence	0
4	Boston University	2

Note: * denotes overtime period(s)

== Results ==
=== Opening Round ===
==== (6) Maine vs. (11) New Hampshire ====
March 2	Maine	4 - 1	New Hampshire	Alfond Arena	Recap
No Scoring		First period	16:01 - PP - Liam Blackburn (Vela, Salvaggio)
(Michel, Keeper) Brendan Robbins - 03:13		Second period	No scoring
(Binner, Fossier) Cédric Lacroix - GW - 16:29 (Robbins) Tim Doherty - EN - 18:24 (Keeper) Cédric Lacroix - EN - 18:50		Third period	No scoring
( 26 saves / 27 shots ) Jeremy Swayman		Goalie stats	Daniel Tirone ( 45 saves / 47 shots )

March 3	Maine	3 - 2	New Hampshire	Alfond Arena	Recap
No Scoring		First period	06:55 - PP - Liam Blackburn (Fregona, Gildon)
(Michel, Keeper) Mitchell Fossier - 03:03 (Michel, Keeper) Nolan Vesey - 18:04		Second period	No scoring
(Michel, Fossier) Eduards Tralmaks - GW PP - 19:38		Third period	19:07 - EA - Benton Maass (Kelleher, Vela)
( 27 saves / 29 shots ) Jeremy Swayman		Goalie stats	Daniel Tirone ( 40 saves / 43 shots )

Maine won series 2–0

==== (7) Massachusetts–Lowell vs. (10) Merrimack ====
March 2	Merrimack	2 - 1	OT	Mass-Lowell	Tsongas Center	Recap
(unassisted) Connor Wilson - 15:52		First period		No scoring
No scoring		Second period		No scoring
No scoring		Third period		15:33 - Jace Hennig (Seney, Tavernier)
No scoring		First overtime period		18:01 - GW - Ludvig Larsson (Tavernier, Petti)
( 39 saves / 41 shots ) Christoffer Hernberg		Goalie stats		Craig Pantano ( 32 saves / 33 shots )

March 3	Merrimack	3 - 2	OT	Mass-Lowell	Tsongas Center	Recap
No Scoring		First period		19:21 - SH - Michael Babcock (Seney)
(Master, Kamrass) Mattias Göransson - 08:06		Second period		05:31 - Alfred Larsson (Irvine)
(Baxter, Mueller) Connor Wilson - 08:31		Third period		No scoring
No scoring		First overtime period		18:48 - GW - Jace Hennig (Seney, Tibbet)
( 24 saves / 27 shots ) Christoffer Hernberg		Goalie stats		Craig Pantano ( 30 saves / 32 shots )

Merrimack won series 2–0

==== (8) Massachusetts vs. (9) Vermont ====
March 1	Massachusetts	3 - 2	OT	Vermont	Mullins Center	Recap
No Scoring		First period		13:09 - Matt Alvaro (unassisted)
(Chau, Makar) John Leonard - PP - 00:59		Second period		16:46 - PP - Jake Massie (Alvaro, Coughlin)
(unassisted) Cale Makar - PP - 08:35		Third period		No scoring
(Leonard, Rufo) Philip Lagunov - GW - 19:56		First overtime period		No scoring
( 31 saves / 33 shots ) Matt Murray		Goalie stats		Stefanos Lekkas ( 38 saves / 41 shots )

March 2	Massachusetts	3 - 4	OT	Vermont	Mullins Center	Recap
No Scoring		First period		11:04 - Ross Colton (Darrar, Evers)
(Suter, Boeing) Austin Plevy - 07:29 (Gaudet) Mitchell Chaffee - 18:27		Second period		05:33 - Matt Alvaro (Lodermeier)
(Couturier, McLaughlin) Austin Albrecht - 00:29		Third period		08:05 - Rob Darrar (unassisted)
No scoring		First overtime period		00:12 - GW - Cory Thomas (Colton, Alvaro)
( 19 saves / 23 shots ) Matt Murray		Goalie stats		Stefanos Lekkas ( 39 saves / 42 shots )

March 4	Massachusetts	5 - 1	Vermont	Mullins Center	Recap
(Leonard, Rufo) Mario Ferraro - 02:40 (Boeing, Ferraro) Jake Gaudet - GW - 09:53		First period	No scoring
(Chukarov) Austin Albrecht - 09:38 (Chaffee, Gaudet) Oliver Chau - 12:42		Second period	04:53 - Matt O'Donnell (Puffer, Blanleil)
(unassisted) John Leonard - 13:09		Third period	No scoring
( 30 saves / 31 shots ) Ryan Wischow		Goalie stats	Stefanos Lekkas ( 25 saves / 30 shots )

Massachusetts won series 2–1

=== Quarterfinals ===
==== (1) Boston College vs. (10) Merrimack ====
March 9	Boston College	1 - 0	Merrimack	Conte Forum	Recap
No Scoring		First period	No scoring
(McPhee, Räsänen) Connor Moore - GW - 17:08		Second period	No scoring
No scoring		Third period	No scoring
( 37 saves / 37 shots ) Joseph Woll		Goalie stats	Craig Pantano ( 12 saves / 13 shots )

March 10	Boston College	4 - 3	OT	Merrimack	Conte Forum	Recap
No Scoring		First period		No scoring
(Hutsko, Kim) Mike Booth - 12:02 (Grando) JD Dudek - 15:20		Second period		15:39 - Alfred Larsson (Kovacevic, Coomes); 19:33 - PP - Ludvig Larsson (Tavernier, Kolquist)
(Hutsko, Kim) Julius Mattila - 04:14		Third period		15:05 - Tyler Irvine (A. Larsson, Coomes)
(Moore) Christopher Grando - GW SH - 04:20		First overtime period		No scoring
( 30 saves / 33 shots ) Joseph Woll		Goalie stats		Craig Pantano ( 18 saves / 22 shots )

Boston College won series 2–0

==== (2) Northeastern vs. (8) Massachusetts ====
March 9	Northeastern	3 - 2	Massachusetts	Matthews Arena	Recap
No Scoring		First period	No scoring
(Davies, Solow) Nolan Stevens - PP - 08:51 (Davies, Solow) Dylan Sikura - PP - 12:51		Second period	13:13 - Austin Albrecht (Rufo, Lagunov)
(Gaudette, Schule) Dylan Sikura - GW - 13:48		Third period	02:42 - Brett Boeing (Ferraro, Chaffee)
( 29 saves / 31 shots ) Cayden Primeau		Goalie stats	Ryan Wischow ( 28 saves / 31 shots )

March 10	Northeastern	7 - 2	Massachusetts	Matthews Arena	Recap
(Lerario, Hawkins) Jeremy Davies - 03:42 (Griffin, Shea) Nolan Stevens - 19:29		First period	No scoring
(Cecere, Sikura) Adam Gaudette - GW - 03:21 (unassisted) Dylan Sikura - 10:47 (Gaudette, Shea) Brandon Hawkins - 12:37 (Davies, Solow) Nolan Stevens - PP - 18:56		Second period	No scoring
(Schultz, Hawkins) Lincoln Griffin - 08:32		Third period	04:15 - John Leonard (Lagunov, Rufo); 16:50 - Brett Boeing (Makar, Plevy)
( 28 saves / 30 shots ) Cayden Primeau		Goalie stats	Ryan Wischow ( 14 saves / 20 shots ) / Brad Arvanitis ( 7 saves / 8 shots )

Northeastern won series 2–0

==== (3) Providence vs. (6) Maine ====
March 9	Providence	4 - 3	Maine	Schneider Arena	Recap
(Wilkins, Desharnais) Erik Foley - 11:01 (Björkqvist) Bailey Conger - 11:42		First period	00:38 - Tim Doherty (Vesey); 08:10 - PP - Tim Doherty (Vesey, Tiuraniemi)
(Duhaime, Young) Scott Conway - 18:35		Second period	12:43 - PP - Veli-Matti Tiuraniemi (Vesey)
(Bryson) Josh Wilkins - GW - 16:50		Third period	No scoring
( 21 saves / 24 shots ) Hayden Hawkey		Goalie stats	Jeremy Swayman ( 37 saves / 41 shots )

March 10	Providence	3 - 2	Maine	Schneider Arena	Recap
(Printz, Duhaime) Scott Conway - 03:14 (Young, Mirageas) Brandon Duhaime - PP - 08:20 (Pinho) Josh Wilkins - GW PP - 18:52		First period	No scoring
No scoring		Second period	01:08 - PP - Eduards Tralmaks (Keeper, Fossier); 01:53 - Nolan Vesey (Keeper, Tiuraniemi)
No scoring		Third period	No scoring
( 14 saves / 16 shots ) Hayden Hawkey		Goalie stats	Jeremy Swayman ( 38 saves / 41 shots )

Providence won series 2–0

==== (4) Boston University vs. (5) Connecticut ====
March 9	Boston University	5 - 4	OT	Connecticut	Agganis Arena	Recap
(Melanson, Kotkansalo) Jordan Greenway - 04:52 (Tkachuk, Krys) Drew Melanson - 07:48		First period		04:34 - Max Kalter (Rigali)
No scoring		Second period		01:31 - Karl El-Mir (Drake, Pratt); 14:31 - Maxim Letunov (Pratt, Austin)
(Fabbro, Krys) Jordan Greenway - PP - 02:02 (Bowers) Chad Krys - 16:22		Third period		14:57 - PP - Benjamin Freeman (unassisted)
(Cockerill, Bowers) Bobo Carpenter - GW - 05:02		First overtime period		No scoring
( 36 saves / 40 shots ) Jake Oettinger		Goalie stats		Adam Huska ( 33 saves / 38 shots )

March 10	Boston University	2 - 1	Connecticut	Agganis Arena	Recap
(Fabbro, Greenway) Brady Tkachuk - PP - 19:56		First period	No scoring
(Bowers, Fabbro) Logan Cockerill - GW - 16:52		Second period	09:08 - Max Kalter (Masonius, Naas)
No scoring		Third period	No scoring
( 36 saves / 37 shots ) Jake Oettinger		Goalie stats	Adam Huska ( 17 saves / 19 shots )

Boston University won series 2–0

=== Semifinals ===
==== (1) Boston College vs. (4) Boston University ====
March 16	Boston College	3 - 4	OT	Boston University	TD Garden	Recap
(McPhee, Räsänen) Connor Moore - 09:31		First period		No scoring
(Cotton) Julius Mattila - 03:26		Second period		08:57 - Ty Amonte (Crone, Curry); 10:34 - David Farrance (Krys, Greenway)
(Dudek, McPhee) Christopher Brown - 14:41		Third period		15:26 - Drew Melanson (Greenway, Farrance)
No scoring		First overtime period		15:40 - GW - Patrick Curry (Bowers, Carpenter)
( 41 saves / 45 shots ) Joseph Woll		Goalie stats		Jake Oettinger ( 36 saves / 39 shots )

==== (2) Northeastern vs. (3) Providence ====
March 18	Northeastern	2 - 3	OT	Providence	TD Garden	Recap
No Scoring		First period		08:57 - Vimal Sukumaran (Bunz)
(Gaudette) Dylan Sikura - SH - 18:06		Second period		No scoring
(Picking, Davies) Austin Goldstein - 03:03		Third period		18:09 - Kasper Björkqvist (Duhaime)
No scoring		First overtime period		09:55 - GW - Brandon Duhaime (Davis, Conway)
( 31 saves / 34 shots ) Cayden Primeau		Goalie stats		Hayden Hawkey ( 38 saves / 40 shots )

=== Championship ===
==== (3) Providence vs. (4) Boston University ====
March 17	Providence	0 - 2	Boston University	TD Garden	Recap
No Scoring		First period	No scoring
No scoring		Second period	No scoring
No scoring		Third period	00:56 - GW - Drew Melanson (Greenway, Tkachuk); 18:38 - EN - Bobo Carpenter (unassisted)
( 27 saves / 28 shots ) Hayden Hawkey		Goalie stats	Jake Oettinger ( 30 saves / 30 shots )

== Tournament awards ==
=== All-Tournament Team ===
- F Jordan Greenway Boston University
- F Dylan Sikura Northeastern
- F Brandon Duhaime Providence
- D Chad Krys Boston University
- D Jacob Bryson Providence
- G Jake Oettinger* Boston University

* Tournament MVP(s)
