= 2017–18 Maine Black Bears men's ice hockey season =

- Conference: Hockey East
- Home ice: Alfond Arena

Record
- Overall: 18–16–4 (10–11–3 HEA)
- Home: 8–7–3
- Road: 9–8–1
- Neutral: 1–1–0

Coaches and captains
- Head coach: Red Gendron
- Assistant coaches: Ben Guite; Alfie Michaud; Brad Schuler
- Captain(s): Mark Hamilton; Chase Pearson
- Alternate captain: Cedric Lacroix

The 2017–18 Maine Black Bears men's ice hockey team represented the University of Maine during the 2017–18 NCAA Division I men's ice hockey season. The Black Bears were coached by fifth-year head coach Red Gendron, and played their home games at Alfond Arena on campus in Orono, Maine, competing in Hockey East.

== Personnel ==
=== Roster ===
No.	Nat.	Player	Class	Pos	Height	Weight	DoB	Hometown	Previous team	NHL rights
1		Jeremy Swayman	Freshman	G	6' 3" (1.91 m)	200 lb (91 kg)		Anchorage, Alaska	Sioux Falls Stampede (USHL)	BOS, 111 overall 2017
2		Patrick Holway	Sophomore	D	6' 4" (1.93 m)	214 lb (97 kg)		Cohasset, Massachusetts	Dubuque Fighting Saints (USHL)	DET, 170 overall 2015
3		Rob Michel	Junior	D	6' 2" (1.88 m)	195 lb (88 kg)		Camillus, New York	West Gennessee	—
4		Jack Quinlivan	Freshman	F	6' 0" (1.83 m)	187 lb (85 kg)		Shrewsbury, Massachusetts	Boston Junior Bruins (USPHL)	—
5		Ryan Smith	Sophomore	F	6' 0" (1.83 m)	205 lb (93 kg)		Roanoke, Virginia	Green Bay Gamblers (USHL)	—
6		Oliver Herner	Sophomore	D	6' 7" (2.01 m)	231 lb (105 kg)		Budapest, Hungary	MAC Budapest	—
7		Jake Pappalardo	Sophomore	D	5' 10" (1.78 m)	185 lb (84 kg)		Salem, New Hampshire	Proctor Academy	—
10		Kevin Hock	Freshman	F	5' 11" (1.8 m)	178 lb (81 kg)		Braintree, Massachusetts	Dexter School	—
11		Mitchell Fossier	Sophomore	F	5' 11" (1.8 m)	188 lb (85 kg)		Alpharetta, Georgia	Sioux City Musketeers (USHL)	—
12		Chase Pearson (C)	Sophomore	F	6' 2" (1.88 m)	205 lb (93 kg)		Alpharetta, Georgia	Youngstown Phantoms (USHL)	DET, 140 overall 2015
13		Nolan Vesey	Senior	F	6' 1" (1.85 m)	205 lb (93 kg)		North Reading, Massachusetts	Neponsit Valley	TOR, 158 overall 2014
14		Cedric Lacroix (A)	Senior	F	6' 1" (1.85 m)	185 lb (84 kg)		Shefford, Quebec	Sioux City Musketeers (USHL)	—
15		Canon Pieper	Senior	F	5' 11" (1.8 m)	185 lb (84 kg)		Roseville, Minnesota	Quinnipiac (ECAC)	—
16		Alexis Binner	Freshman	D	6' 3" (1.91 m)	216 lb (98 kg)		Stocksund, Sweden	Green Bay Gamblers (USHL)	—
17		Tim Doherty	Sophomore	F	6' 0" (1.83 m)	182 lb (83 kg)		Portsmouth, Rhode Island	Boston Junior Bruins (USPHL)	—
18		Keith Muehlbauer	Junior	D	6' 2" (1.88 m)	210 lb (95 kg)		Apple Valley, Minnesota	Eastview HS	—
20		Veli-Matti Tiuraniemi	Freshman	D	6' 0" (1.83 m)	195 lb (88 kg)		Jakobstad, Finland	Dubuque Fighting Saints (USHL)	—
22		Brendan Robbins	Junior	F	6' 0" (1.83 m)	185 lb (84 kg)		Nashua, New Hampshire	Nashua North HS	—
23		Sam Becker	Junior	D	6' 0" (1.83 m)	185 lb (84 kg)		Roseville, Minnesota	Minnesota Magicians (NAHL)	—
24		Peter Housakos	Sophomore	F	6' 2" (1.88 m)	186 lb (84 kg)		Montreal, Quebec	St. Mark's School	—
25		Brady Keeper	Freshman	D	6' 0" (1.83 m)	195 lb (88 kg)		Cross Lake, Manitoba	OCN Blizzard (MJHL)	—
26		Cameron Spicer	Freshman	D	6' 0" (1.83 m)	190 lb (86 kg)		Erie, Colorado	Islanders Hockey Club (USPHL)	—
27		Patrick Shea	Sophomore	F	5' 11" (1.8 m)	190 lb (86 kg)		Marshfield, Massachusetts	Kimball Union	FLA, 192 overall 2015
28		Adrian Holesinsky	Freshman	F	5' 11" (1.8 m)	195 lb (88 kg)		Cadca, Czech Republic	Janesville Jets (NAHL)	—
29		Daniel Perez	Junior	F	6' 3" (1.91 m)	215 lb (98 kg)		Bloomfield, New Jersey	St. Peter's Prep	—
30		Emil Westerlund	Freshman	F	6' 1" (1.85 m)	200 lb (91 kg)		Linköping, Sweden	Linköpings HC J20	—
33		Stephen Mundinger	Sophomore	G	6' 8" (2.03 m)	255 lb (116 kg)		Smithtown, New York	New York Aviators	—
35		Rob McGovern	Junior	G	6' 4" (1.93 m)	230 lb (104 kg)		Weymouth, Massachusetts	Thayer Academy	—
47		Mark Hamilton (C)	Senior	D	6' 3" (1.91 m)	220 lb (100 kg)		Winthrop, Massachusetts	Vernon Vipers	—
67		Malcolm Hayes	Junior (RS)	F	6' 3" (1.91 m)	228 lb (103 kg)		Atlanta, Georgia	Cushing Academy	—

As of March 10, 2018

== Standings ==
2017–18 Hockey East men's standings
	Conference record							Overall record					
	GP	W	L	T	PTS	GF	GA	GP	W	L	T	GF	GA
#19 Boston College†	24	18	6	0	36	79	53	37	20	14	3	108	99
#11 Northeastern	24	15	6	3	33	79	49	38	23	10	5	136	81
#7 Providence	24	13	7	4	30	70	50	40	24	12	4	117	85
#10 Boston University*	24	12	8	4	28	72	60	40	22	14	4	124	105
Connecticut	24	11	12	1	23	70	62	36	15	19	2	100	102
Maine	24	10	11	3	23	65	74	38	18	16	4	117	115
Massachusetts–Lowell	24	11	13	0	22	68	75	36	17	19	0	101	99
Massachusetts	24	9	13	2	20	60	74	39	17	20	2	104	119
Vermont	24	6	12	6	18	51	75	37	10	20	7	79	112
Merrimack	24	7	15	2	16	51	70	37	12	21	4	83	105
New Hampshire	24	5	14	5	15	48	71	36	10	20	6	88	104
Championship: March 17, 2018 † indicates conference regular season champion; * indicates conference tournament champion Rankings: USCHO.com Top 20 Poll; updated March 1, 2018

== Schedule ==
Date	Time	Opponent^{#}	Rank^{#}	Site	TV	Result	Attendance	Record
Exhibition
October 1	4:00 p.m.	Acadia*		Alfond Arena • Orono, Maine		W 3–1	3,128	0–0–0
Regular season
October 6	7:30 p.m.	Connecticut		Alfond Arena • Orono, Maine		W 4–3 ^{OT}	3,093	1–0–0 (1–0–0)
October 7	4:00 p.m.	Connecticut		Alfond Arena • Orono, Maine		L 1–5	3,130	1–1–0 (1–1–0)
October 20	7:00 p.m.	Miami Ohio*		Alfond Arena • Orono, Maine		L 5–7	3,549	1–2–0
October 21	7:00 p.m.	Miami Ohio*		Alfond Arena • Orono, Maine		W 6–3	3,784	2–2–0
October 27	7:00 p.m.	#10 Minnesota-Duluth*		Alfond Arena • Orono, Maine		L 1–2	3,483	2–3–0
October 28	7:30 p.m.	#10 Minnesota-Duluth*		Alfond Arena • Orono, Maine	FCS	L 0–2	3,506	2–4–0
November 3	7:15 p.m.	at UMass Lowell		Tsongas Center • Lowell, Massachusetts		L 2–3	4,537	2–5–0 (1–2–0)
November 4	4:00 p.m.	at UMass Lowell		Tsongas Center • Lowell, Massachusetts		W 6–2	5,449	3–5–0 (2–2–0)
November 17	7:30 p.m.	#18 Boston University		Alfond Arena • Orono, Maine	FCS	W 5–2	4,532	4–5–0 (3–2–0)
November 18	7:00 p.m.	#18 Boston University		Cross Insurance Arena • Portland, Maine		L 0–7	6,206	4–6–0 (3–3–0)
November 24	2:00 p.m.	vs. #10 Providence		SSE Arena Belfast • Belfast, Northern Ireland (Friendship Four opening round)	NESN	L 0–3		4–7–0 (3–4–0)
November 25	10:00 a.m.	vs. Rensselaer*		SSE Arena Belfast • Belfast, Northern Ireland (Friendship Four consolation game)	NESN	W 4–2		5–7–0
December 1	7:00 p.m.	Vermont		Alfond Arena • Orono, Maine		T 2–2 ^{OT}	3,365	5–7–1 (3–4–1)
December 2	5:00 p.m.	Vermont		Alfond Arena • Orono, Maine	FCS	W 6–2	4,264	6–7–1 (4–4–1)
December 8	7:00 p.m.	at Quinnipiac*		High Point Solutions Arena • Hamden, Connecticut		W 7–4	2,875	7–7–1
December 9	7:00 p.m.	at Quinnipiac*		High Point Solutions Arena • Hamden, Connecticut		W 5–3	1,845	8–7–1
December 29	4:00 p.m.	at Rensselaer*		Houston Field House • Troy, New York		W 3–2	2,687	9–7–1
December 30	4:00 p.m.	at Rensselaer*		Houston Field House • Troy, New York		W 5–2	2,687	10–7–1
January 6, 2018	7:00 p.m.	at Boston University	#20	Agganis Arena • Boston, Massachusetts		W 3-0	3,957	11–7–1 (5–4–1)
January 8	7:00 p.m.	at Brown*	#20	Meehan Auditorium • Providence, Rhode Island		T 4-4 ^{OT}	717	11–7–2
January 12	7:00 p.m.	at #10 Northeastern	#20	Matthews Arena • Boston, Massachusetts		L 3-5	2,013	11–8–2 (5–5–1)
January 13	7:00 p.m.	at #10 Northeastern	#20	Matthews Arena • Boston, Massachusetts		L 3-5	1,828	11–9–2 (5–6–1)
January 16	7:00 p.m.	UMass		Alfond Arena • Orono, Maine		W 3-1	3,093	12–9–2 (6–6–1)
January 19	7:00 p.m.	New Hampshire		Alfond Arena • Orono, Maine		T 2-2 ^{OT}	4,788	12–9–3 (6–6–2)
January 20	7:30 p.m.	New Hampshire		Alfond Arena • Orono, Maine	FCS	T 3-3 ^{OT}	5,165	12–9–4 (6–6–3)
January 26	7:00 p.m.	at UMass		Mullins Center • Amherst, Massachusetts		W 3-2	2,718	13–9–4 (7–6–3)
January 27	7:00 p.m.	at UMass		Mullins Center • Amherst, Massachusetts		W 3-2	3,934	14–9–4 (8–6–3)
February 2	7:30 p.m.	Merrimack		Alfond Arena • Orono, Maine	FCN	W 4-3 ^{OT}	4,124	15–9–4 (9–6–3)
February 3	7:00 p.m.	Merrimack		Alfond Arena • Orono, Maine		L 2-3 ^{OT}	4,512	15–10–4 (9–7–3)
February 9	7:15 p.m.	at #9 Providence		Schneider Arena • Providence, Rhode Island	NESN	L 2-3 ^{OT}	3,033	15–11–4 (9–8–3)
February 14	7:00 p.m.	at New Hampshire		Whittemore Center • Durham, New Hampshire	ESPN3	W 4-3 ^{OT}	5,143	16–11–4 (10–8–3)
February 14	7:30 p.m.	#19 Boston College		Alfond Arena • Orono, Maine		L 0-5	5,165	16–12–4 (10–9–3)
February 23	7:00 p.m.	at #20 Boston College		Kelley Rink • Chestnut Hill, Massachusetts	ESPN3	L 3-6	4,175	16–13–4 (10–10–3)
February 24	7:00 p.m.	at #20 Boston College		Kelley Rink • Chestnut Hill, Massachusetts	ESPN3	L 1-2	5,245	16–14–4 (10–11–3)
Hockey East tournament
March 2	7:30 p.m.	New Hampshire*		Alfond Arena • Orono, Maine (Hockey East first round)	NESN	W 2–4	3,645	17–14–4
March 3	7:30 p.m.	New Hampshire*		Alfond Arena • Orono, Maine (Hockey East first round)	FCS	W 3–2	4,003	18–14–4
March 9	7:00 p.m.	at #9 Providence*		Schneider Arena • Providence, Rhode Island (Hockey East semifinal round)	NBC Sports Boston	L 3–4	2,165	18–15–4
March 10	7:00 p.m.	at #9 Providence*		Schneider Arena • Providence, Rhode Island (Hockey East semifinal round)	NBC Sports Boston	L 2–3	2,475	18–16–4 Source:
*Non-conference game. ^{#}Rankings from USCHO.com Poll. All times are in Eastern Time.

== Rankings ==
Poll	Week																							
Poll	Pre	1	2	3	4	5	6	7	8	9	10	11	12	13	14	15	16	17	18	19	20	21	22	23 (Final)
USCHO.com	NR	NR	NR	NR	NR	NR	NR	NR	NR	NR	NR	20	NV	NR	NR	NR	NR	NR	NR	NR	NR	NR	NR	NR
USA Today	NR	NR	NR	NR	NR	NR	NR	NR	NR	NR	NR	NR	NR	NR	NR	NR	NR	NR	NR	NR	NR	NR	NR	NR
