= Dylan Sikura =

Canadian ice hockey player (born 1995)

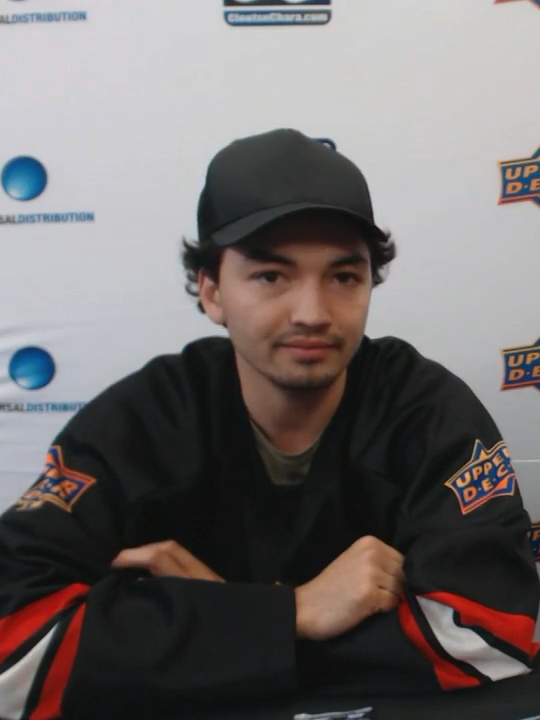
- Sikura in 2018
- Born: June 1, 1995 (age 31) Aurora, Ontario, Canada
- Height: 5 ft 11 in (180 cm)
- Weight: 166 lb (75 kg; 11 st 12 lb)
- Position: Centre
- Shoots: Left
- KHL team Former teams: Dynamo Moscow; Chicago Blackhawks; Vegas Golden Knights; Colorado Avalanche; Skellefteå AIK; Traktor Chelyabinsk
- NHL draft: 178th overall, 2014; Chicago Blackhawks
- Playing career: 2018–present

Dylan Sikura (born June 1, 1995) is a Canadian professional ice hockey centre who currently plays for HC Dynamo Moscow of the Kontinental Hockey League (KHL). He was drafted by the Chicago Blackhawks in the sixth round, 178th overall, in the 2014 NHL entry draft. Before turning professional, Sikura played college ice hockey with Northeastern University, where he was named to the AHCA East First-Team All-American and the Hockey East First All-Star team.

== Playing career ==
Sikura played for the Aurora Tigers of the Ontario Junior Hockey League for three years before committing to play for Northeastern University in February 2014. That June, Sikura was drafted 178th overall in the sixth round of the 2014 NHL entry draft by the Chicago Blackhawks.

Sikura played hockey for four years at Northeastern University. In the 2016–17 season Sikura was named to the Hockey East Second Team All-Star and named a Hobey Baker Award candidate. In his last year with the Huskies, Sikura and the Huskies won the program's first Beanpot championship in 30 years, defeating Boston University by a score of 5–2. Sikura recorded a pair of assists during the championship game. At the conclusion of the season, Sikura was again named a Hobey Baker candidate, and named to the First Team All-Star and Hockey East All-Tournament Team. He was also named an AHCA East First-Team All-American along with teammates Adam Gaudette and Jeremy Davies. He finished his career with Northeastern with 146 points, placing him 14th in the program's all-time scoring list.

On March 25, 2018, Sikura signed a two-year entry-level contract with the Chicago Blackhawks. He made his NHL debut on March 29, 2018, in a game against the Winnipeg Jets. He recorded his first two NHL points in his debut, with assists on Erik Gustafsson's goal and Alex DeBrincat's goal.

After attending the Blackhawks training camp prior to the 2018–19 season, Sikura was reassigned to the Blackhawks American Hockey League affiliate, the Rockford IceHogs. On December 12, Sikura was called up the NHL for the first time that season after recording 18 points in 26 games, leading the team in goals and points. After playing in 11 games with the Blackhawks and collecting three points, Sikura was reassigned to the IceHogs. On February 11, Sikura was again called up from Rockford and played his first game back the next day against the Boston Bruins. After nearly two months in the NHL, Sikura was reassigned to the IceHogs on April 2 to help the team qualify for the 2019 Calder Cup playoffs.

On June 28, 2019, the Blackhawks re-signed Sikura to a two-year contract extension. After beginning the season with the IceHogs, Sikura was recalled to the NHL on December 8. Upon his recall, Sikura was leading the team with nine goals and 16 points in 22 games. On January 5, 2020, Sikura recorded his first career NHL goal against the Detroit Red Wings to clinch a 4–2 win.

On September 28, 2020, Sikura was traded by the Blackhawks to the Vegas Golden Knights in exchange for Brandon Pirri.

On July 29, 2021, having left the Golden Knights organization, Sikura was signed as a free agent to a one-year, two-way contract with the Colorado Avalanche. After attending the 2021 Avalanche training camp, Sikura was assigned to AHL affiliate, the Colorado Eagles, to begin the 2021–22 season. In a first-line offensive role with the Eagles, Sikura established career highs to finish sixth in league scoring with 33 goals and 40 assists for 73 points in just 60 regular season games. He made 5 appearances through a recall to the Avalanche, registering 1 assist. In the playoffs with the Eagles, Sikura was limited by injury to 6 post-season games, collecting 4 points. Sikura remained a part of the Avalanche black aces squad through the remainder of the playoffs, as the club went on to claim the Stanley Cup.

As a free agent from the Avalanche at the conclusion of his contract, Sikura opted to return to his original club by re-joining the Chicago Blackhawks on a one-year, two-way contract on July 14, 2022. In his return to the Blackhawks, Sikura rejoined former AHL club the Rockford IceHogs for the 2022–23 season, and collected 12 goals and 32 points through 52 games. On March 2, 2023, the Blackhawks traded Sikura to the Anaheim Ducks in exchange for prospect Max Golod.

After 6 professional seasons in North America, Sikura left the Ducks as a free agent and embarked on a career abroad, agreeing to a one-year contract with Swedish club, Skellefteå AIK of the Swedish Hockey League (SHL), on September 7, 2023. In his lone season with Skellefteå, Sikura quickly adapted to the European play-style and registered 10 goals and 26 points through 49 regular season games. He posted 9 points in 13 playoff games to help Skellefteå claim the Swedish Championship.

As a free agent, Sikura left Sweden and was signed to a one-year contract with Russian club, Traktor Chelyabinsk of the KHL, on June 7, 2024. Sikura commenced the 2024-25 season with Chelyabinsk, notching 5 goals and 15 points through 28 games before he was traded to Dynamo Moscow on December 27, 2024.

== International play ==
Sikura represented Team Canada at the 2017 Spengler Cup in Davos, Switzerland. He played in four games and recorded one point to help Canada win the tournament.

Sikura was named to Team Canada's pre-Olympic roster for the 2018 Winter Olympics but failed to make the final roster.

== Personal life ==
Sikura's brother Tyler is also a professional ice hockey player. Sikura is half Slovak and half Japanese. His grandfather escaped Czechoslovakia and arrived in Nova Scotia in the 1950s. He ran a thoroughbred race horse breeding farm, Hill 'n' Dale Farms, which was later taken over by Sikura's uncle and father after his grandfather's death.

== Career statistics ==
=== Regular season and playoffs ===
			Regular season					Playoffs
Season	Team	League	GP	G	A	Pts	PIM	GP	G	A	Pts	PIM
2011–12	Aurora Tigers	OJHL	44	6	12	18	2	9	2	0	2	0
2012–13	Aurora Tigers	OJHL	46	8	20	28	28	6	0	1	1	0
2013–14	Aurora Tigers	OJHL	41	17	47	64	16	21	10	11	21	28
2014–15	Northeastern University	HE	25	5	2	7	0	—	—	—	—	—
2015–16	Northeastern University	HE	39	10	18	28	2	—	—	—	—	—
2016–17	Northeastern University	HE	38	21	36	57	12	—	—	—	—	—
2017–18	Northeastern University	HE	38	22	32	54	22	—	—	—	—	—
2017–18	Chicago Blackhawks	NHL	5	0	3	3	0	—	—	—	—	—
2018–19	Rockford IceHogs	AHL	46	17	18	35	12	—	—	—	—	—
2018–19	Chicago Blackhawks	NHL	33	0	8	8	0	—	—	—	—	—
2019–20	Rockford IceHogs	AHL	45	14	19	33	20	—	—	—	—	—
2019–20	Chicago Blackhawks	NHL	9	1	2	3	0	—	—	—	—	—
2020–21	Henderson Silver Knights	AHL	30	11	11	22	12	3	3	2	5	2
2020–21	Vegas Golden Knights	NHL	6	2	0	2	0	2	0	0	0	0
2021–22	Colorado Eagles	AHL	60	33	40	73	16	6	2	4	6	2
2021–22	Colorado Avalanche	NHL	5	0	1	1	0	—	—	—	—	—
2022–23	Rockford IceHogs	AHL	52	14	18	32	10	—	—	—	—	—
2022–23	San Diego Gulls	AHL	17	4	8	12	6	—	—	—	—	—
2023–24	Skellefteå AIK	SHL	49	10	16	26	10	13	4	5	9	4
2024–25	Traktor Chelyabinsk	KHL	28	5	10	15	8	–	–	–	–	–
2024–25	Dynamo Moscow	KHL	28	8	6	14	4	17	4	8	12	6
2025–26	Dynamo Moscow	KHL	67	27	21	48	34	4	1	0	1	0
NHL totals			58	3	14	17	0	2	0	0	0	0
KHL totals			123	40	37	77	46	21	5	8	13	6

=== International ===
Year	Team	Event	Result	GP	G	A	Pts	PIM
2017	Canada	SC	1st place, gold medalist(s)	4	0	1	1	0
Senior totals				4	0	1	1	0

== Awards and honours ==
Award	Year	Ref
College
Hockey East Second All-Star Team	2017	
Hockey East First All-Star Team	2018	
Hockey East All-Tournament Team	2018	
AHCA East First-Team All-American	2018	
SHL
Le Mat Trophy	2024	
