= 2017–18 Boston College Eagles men's ice hockey season =

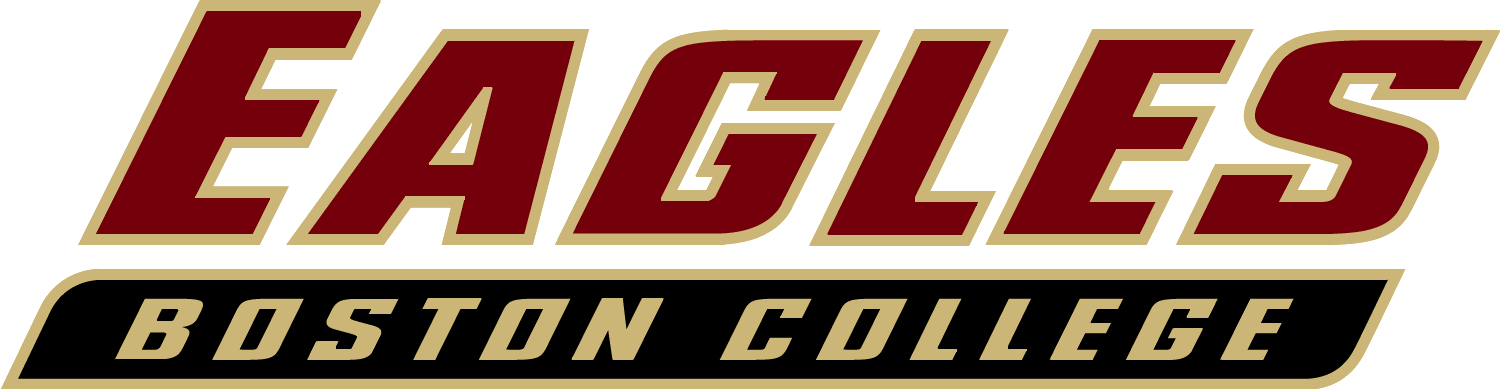

Hockey East, Regular Season Champions
- Conference: 1st Hockey East
- Home ice: Kelley Rink

Rankings
- USCHO.com/CBS College Sports: #19 (Final)
- USA Today/USA Hockey Magazine: RV (Final)

Record
- Overall: 20–14–3 (18–6–0)
- Home: 11–5–2
- Road: 9–5–0
- Neutral: 0–4–1

Coaches and captains
- Head coach: Jerry York
- Assistant coaches: Greg Brown; Mike Ayers; Marty McInnis
- Captain(s): Casey Fitzgerald; Michael Kim; Christopher Brown

The 2017–18 Boston College Eagles men's ice hockey team represented Boston College in the 2017–18 NCAA Division I men's ice hockey season. The team was coached by Jerry York, '67, his twenty-fourth season behind the bench at Boston College. The Eagles played their home games at Kelley Rink on the campus of Boston College, competing in Hockey East.

The Eagles competed in two mid-season tournaments during the 2017–18 season, the first of which took place during the holiday break, where the Eagles made the trip to the T-Mobile Arena in Las Vegas, Nevada for the inaugural Ice Vegas Invitational on January 5 and 6. The Eagles fell 4–3 to the Michigan Tech Huskies in the opening round, and officially tied the Northern Michigan Wildcats in the consolation round by a score of 3–3, with the Wildcats winning the unofficial shootout to take third place. For their second tournament of the season, the Eagles played in the 66th Annual Beanpot Tournament at the TD Garden in Boston, Massachusetts on February 5 and 12. Boston College faced Northeastern in the opening round, losing 3–0, and fell 5–4 in overtime to Harvard in the consolation game, finishing fourth place for the second consecutive year.

The Eagles finished the season 20-14-3, and 18-6-0 in conference play, winning the conference regular season title. They advanced to the Semifinals of the Hockey East tournament, where they were beaten by eventual champions Boston University. The Eagles, having failed to secure an auto-bid by virtue of winning the Hockey East tournament, did not attend the NCAA Tournament for the second straight year.

== Previous season recap ==
The Eagles entered the 2017–18 season following a semi-disappointing year. While attaining a share of the Hockey East regular season title with their strong 21–15–4 record, they missed out on participating in the NCAA Tournament for the first time since 2009 after falling in the Hockey East Tournament championship to UMass Lowell. Additionally, they failed to secure any mid-season tournament title, placing third in the Ice Breaker Tournament and Three Rivers Classic, and placing fourth in the Beanpot tournament.

== Departures ==
Five Senior Eagles graduated in May:

- Chris Calnan – F ^{(Captain)}
- Austin Cangelosi – F ^{(Assistant)}
- Ryan Fitzgerald – F ^{(Assistant)}
- Matt Gaudreau – F
- Scott Savage – D

One Underclassmen left the program early to sign with their drafted teams in the NHL:

- Colin White — F — Ottawa Senators

Additional:

- Chris Shero – F – Not retained on roster from previous season

== Recruiting ==
Boston College adds six freshmen and one graduate transfer for the 2017–18 season: five forwards, and two defensemen.

Player	Position	Nationality	Notes
Michael Karow	Defenseman	United States	Green Bay, WI; Drafted 126th overall by the Arizona Coyotes in the 2017 Draft.
Logan Hutsko	Forward	United States	Tampa, Fl; Played for the US-NTDP of the USHL.
Casey Carreau	Forward	United States	Acushnet, MA; Played for Thayer Academy of the USHS-MA.
Jacob Tortora	Forward	United States	Victor, NY; Played for the US-NTDP of the USHL.
Christopher Grando	Forward	United States	Islip, NY; Played for the Green Bay Gamblers of the USHL.
Aapeli Räsänen	Forward	Finland	Tampere, Finland; Drafted 153rd overall by the Edmonton Oilers in the 2016 Draft.
Kevin Lohan	Defenseman	United States	Cold Spring Harbor, NY; Graduate senior; transferred from Michigan of the B1G conference.

== 2017–2018 roster ==
=== 2017–18 Eagles ===
As of September 12, 2017.

No.	Nat.	Player	Class	Pos	Height	Weight	DoB	Hometown	Previous team	NHL rights
2		Michael Karow	Freshman	D	6' 2" (1.88 m)	200 lb (91 kg)	1998-12-18	Green Bay, Wisconsin	Youngstown (USHL)	ARI, 126th overall 2017
3		Luke McInnis	Sophomore	D	5' 11" (1.8 m)	175 lb (79 kg)	1998-07-29	Hingham, Massachusetts	Youngstown (USHL)	—
4		Michael Kim (C)	Junior	D	6' 0" (1.83 m)	200 lb (91 kg)	1995-06-28	Toronto, Ontario	Boston Jr. Bruins (USPHL)	—
5		Casey Fitzgerald (C)	Junior	D	5' 11" (1.8 m)	185 lb (84 kg)	1997-02-25	North Reading, Massachusetts	USNTDP (USHL)	BUF, 86th overall 2016
7		Connor Moore	Sophomore	D	5' 10" (1.78 m)	175 lb (79 kg)	1997-07-04	Cumming, Georgia	Youngstown (USHL)	—
8		Jesper Mattila	Sophomore	D	5' 11" (1.8 m)	184 lb (83 kg)	1997-10-09	Tampere, Finland	Ilves U20 (Nuorten SM-liiga)	—
9		Logan Hutsko	Freshman	F	5' 10" (1.78 m)	165 lb (75 kg)	1999-02-11	Tampa, Florida	USNTDP (USHL)	—
10		Christopher Brown (C)	Junior	F	6' 0" (1.83 m)	190 lb (86 kg)	1996-02-22	Bloomfield Hills, Michigan	Tri-City (USHL)	BUF, 151st overall 2014
12		Mike Booth	Sophomore	F	5' 11" (1.8 m)	195 lb (88 kg)	1996-03-20	Cary, Illinois	South Shore (USPHL)	—
14		Zach Walker	Sophomore	F	6' 1" (1.85 m)	200 lb (91 kg)	1998-08-02	Boise, Idaho	USNTDP (USHL)	—
15		J. D. Dudek	Junior	F	6' 0" (1.83 m)	195 lb (88 kg)	1996-01-29	Auburn, New Hampshire	Chicago (USHL)	NJD, 152nd overall 2014
17		David Cotton	Sophomore	F	6' 3" (1.91 m)	204 lb (93 kg)	1997-07-09	Parker, Texas	Waterloo (USHL)	CAR, 169th overall 2015
18		Casey Carreau	Freshman	F	5' 10" (1.78 m)	175 lb (79 kg)	1998-03-08	Acushnet, Massachusetts	Thayer (USHS–MA)	—
19		Jacob Tortora	Freshman	F	5' 8" (1.73 m)	162 lb (73 kg)	1999-07-25	Victor, New York	USNTDP (USHL)	—
20		Mike Merulla	Sophomore	F	6' 0" (1.83 m)	194 lb (88 kg)	1996-01-26	Kennett Square, Pennsylvania	Aston (NAHL)	—
21		Christopher Grando	Freshman	F	5' 10" (1.78 m)	165 lb (75 kg)	1998-08-22	Islip, New York	Green Bay (USHL)	—
22		Aapeli Räsänen	Freshman	F	6' 0" (1.83 m)	196 lb (89 kg)	1998-06-01	Tampere, Finland	Sioux City (USHL)	EDM, 153rd overall 2016
24		Kevin Lohan	Senior (RS)	D	6' 5" (1.96 m)	217 lb (98 kg)	1993-10-01	Cold Spring Harbor, New York	Michigan (Big Ten)	—
26		Julius Mattila	Sophomore	F	5' 11" (1.8 m)	170 lb (77 kg)	1997-10-09	Tampere, Finland	Ilves U20 (Nuorten SM-liiga)	—
27		Graham McPhee	Sophomore	F	6' 1" (1.85 m)	174 lb (79 kg)	1998-07-24	Bethesda, Maryland	USNTDP (USHL)	EDM, 149th overall 2016
28		Ron Greco	Sophomore	F	5' 10" (1.78 m)	175 lb (79 kg)	1995-03-20	Philadelphia, Pennsylvania	Philadelphia (USPHL)	—
29		Ian Milosz	Junior	G	6' 7" (2.01 m)	214 lb (97 kg)	1995-05-08	North Grafton, Massachusetts	Boston (USPHL)	—
31		Joseph Woll	Sophomore	G	6' 4" (1.93 m)	202 lb (92 kg)	1998-07-12	St. Louis, Missouri	USNTDP (USHL)	TOR, 62nd overall 2016
35		Ryan Edquist	Sophomore	G	6' 0" (1.83 m)	171 lb (78 kg)	1998-01-28	Lakeville, Minnesota	Madison (USHL)	—

=== Coaching staff ===
Name	Position	Seasons at Boston College	Alma mater
Jerry York	Head Coach	24	Boston College (1967)
Greg Brown	Associate Head Coach	14	Boston College (1990)
Mike Ayers	Assistant coach	5	University of New Hampshire (2004)
Marty McInnis	Assistant coach	5	Boston College (1992)

== Standings ==
2017–18 Hockey East men's standings
	Conference record							Overall record					
	GP	W	L	T	PTS	GF	GA	GP	W	L	T	GF	GA
#19 Boston College†	24	18	6	0	36	79	53	37	20	14	3	108	99
#11 Northeastern	24	15	6	3	33	79	49	38	23	10	5	136	81
#7 Providence	24	13	7	4	30	70	50	40	24	12	4	117	85
#10 Boston University*	24	12	8	4	28	72	60	40	22	14	4	124	105
Connecticut	24	11	12	1	23	70	62	36	15	19	2	100	102
Maine	24	10	11	3	23	65	74	38	18	16	4	117	115
Massachusetts–Lowell	24	11	13	0	22	68	75	36	17	19	0	101	99
Massachusetts	24	9	13	2	20	60	74	39	17	20	2	104	119
Vermont	24	6	12	6	18	51	75	37	10	20	7	79	112
Merrimack	24	7	15	2	16	51	70	37	12	21	4	83	105
New Hampshire	24	5	14	5	15	48	71	36	10	20	6	88	104
Championship: March 17, 2018 † indicates conference regular season champion; * indicates conference tournament champion Rankings: USCHO.com Top 20 Poll; updated March 1, 2018

== Schedule ==
=== Regular season ===
Date	Time	Opponent^{#}	Rank^{#}	Site	TV	Result	Attendance	Record
Exhibition
September 30	7:00 pm	vs. New Brunswick*	#13	Warrior Ice Arena • Boston, Massachusetts		W 4–2	323	0–0–0 (0–0–0)
Regular Season
October 6	7:00 pm	#14 Quinnipiac*	#13	Kelley Rink • Chestnut Hill, Massachusetts	ESPN3	T 1–1 ^{OT}	5,436	0–0–1 (0–0–0)
October 13	7:00 pm	#10 Wisconsin*	#13	Kelley Rink • Chestnut Hill, Massachusetts	ESPN3	L 2–5	5,108	0–1–1 (0–0–0)
October 15	5:00 pm	at #9 Providence	#13	Schneider Arena • Providence, Rhode Island		W 4–3 ^{OT}	3,030	1–1–1 (1–0–0)
October 20	8:30 pm	at #3 St. Cloud State*	#13	Herb Brooks National Hockey Center • St. Cloud, Minnesota		L 2–5	3,778	1–2–1 (1–0–0)
October 21	8:00 pm	at #3 St. Cloud State*	#13	Herb Brooks National Hockey Center • St. Cloud, Minnesota		L 1–3	4,150	1–3–1 (1–0–0)
October 27	7:00 pm	at #11 Providence	#19	Schneider Arena • Providence, Rhode Island		L 1–2	2,765	1–4–1 (1–1–0)
October 28	7:00 pm	#1 Denver*	#19	Kelley Rink • Chestnut Hill, Massachusetts	ESPN3	L 1–6	4,788	1–5–1 (1–1–0)
November 3	7:00 pm	Merrimack		Kelley Rink • Chestnut Hill, Massachusetts	ESPN3	W 3–1	3,675	2–5–1 (2–1–0)
November 4	7:00 pm	at Merrimack		Lawler Arena • North Andover, Massachusetts		W 2–1	2,549	3–5–1 (3–1–0)
November 7	7:00 pm	Connecticut		Kelley Rink • Chestnut Hill, Massachusetts	ESPN3	W 2–1	2,916	4–5–1 (4–1–0)
November 10	7:00 pm	at Vermont		Gutterson Fieldhouse • Burlington, Vermont		W 4–3	4,007	5–5–1 (5–1–0)
November 11	7:00 pm	at Vermont		Gutterson Fieldhouse • Burlington, Vermont		W 5–1	4,007	6–5–1 (6–1–0)
November 17	7:00 pm	at #11 New Hampshire		Whittemore Center • Durham, New Hampshire	ESPN3	W 3–2	5,572	7–5–1 (7–1–0)
November 18	7:00 pm	at #12 Northeastern		Matthews Arena • Boston, Massachusetts		W 4–1	3,291	8–5–1 (8–1–0)
November 24	4:00 pm	Harvard*	#14	Kelley Rink • Chestnut Hill, Massachusetts	ESPN3	T 4–4 ^{OT}	6,283	8–5–2 (8–1–0)
December 1	7:00 pm	Boston University	#15	Kelley Rink • Chestnut Hill, Massachusetts (Green Line Rivalry)	ESPN3	L 4–7	7,884	8–6–2 (8–2–0)
December 2	7:00 pm	at Boston University	#15	Agganis Arena • Boston, Massachusetts (Green Line Rivalry)		W 4–1	6,115	9–6–2 (9–2–0)
December 9	7:00 pm	#10 Northeastern	#14	Kelley Rink • Chestnut Hill, Massachusetts	ESPN3	L 2–5	4,277	9–7–2 (9–3–0)
December 30	3:00 pm	Connecticut	#14	Kelley Rink • Chestnut Hill, Massachusetts	ESPN3	W 2–0	5,555	10–7–2 (10–3–0)
January 5	8:00 pm	vs. Michigan Tech*	#13	T-Mobile Arena • Las Vegas, Nevada (Ice Vegas Invitational)		L 3–4	2,507	10–8–2 (10–3–0)
January 6	8:00 pm	vs. Northern Michigan*	#13	T-Mobile Arena • Las Vegas, Nevada (Ice Vegas Invitational)		T 3–3 ^{OT}	2,237	10–8–3 (10–3–0)
January 12	7:00 pm	#11 Providence	#16	Kelley Rink • Chestnut Hill, Massachusetts	ESPN3	L 1–4	4,709	10–9–3 (10–4–0)
January 14	1:00 pm	New Hampshire	#16	Kelley Rink • Chestnut Hill, Massachusetts	ESPN3	W 5–2	5,094	11–9–3 (11–4–0)
January 23	7:00 pm	Massachusetts	#16	Kelley Rink • Chestnut Hill, Massachusetts	ESPN3	W 2–1	3,274	12–9–3 (12–4–0)
January 26	7:00 pm	at UMass Lowell	#16	Tsongas Center • Lowell, Massachusetts		L 2–3	6,227	12–10–3 (12–5–0)
January 27	7:00 pm	UMass Lowell	#16	Kelley Rink • Chestnut Hill, Massachusetts	ESPN3	W 5–2	5,483	13–10–3 (13–5–0)
February 2	7:00 pm	at Connecticut	#16	XL Center • Hartford, Connecticut		L 3–5	5,914	13–11–3 (13–6–0)
February 5	5:00 pm	vs. #11 Northeastern*	#18	TD Garden • Boston, Massachusetts (Beanpot)	NESN	L 0–3	13,567	13–12–3 (13–6–0)
February 9	7:00 pm	UMass Lowell	#18	Kelley Rink • Chestnut Hill, Massachusetts	ESPN3	W 3–2 ^{OT}	4,170	14–12–3 (14–6–0)
February 12	4:30 pm	vs. Harvard*	#19	TD Garden • Boston, Massachusetts (Beanpot)		L 4–5 ^{OT}	17,565	14–13–3 (14–6–0)
February 15	7:00 pm	at Massachusetts	#19	Mullins Center • Amherst, Massachusetts	NESN	W 5–2	2,459	15–13–3 (15–6–0)
February 17	7:00 pm	at Maine	#19	Alfond Arena • Orono, Maine		W 5–0	5,165	16–13–3 (16–6–0)
February 23	7:00 pm	Maine	#20	Kelley Rink • Chestnut Hill, Massachusetts	ESPN3	W 6–3	4,175	17–13–3 (17–6–0)
February 24	7:00 pm	Maine	#20	Kelley Rink • Chestnut Hill, Massachusetts	ESPN3	W 2–1	5,245	18–13–3 (18–6–0)
Hockey East Tournament
March 9	7:00 pm	Merrimack*	#18	Kelley Rink • Chestnut Hill, Massachusetts (Quarterfinals)		W 1–0	2,484	19–13–3 (18–6–0)
March 10	7:00 pm	Merrimack*	#18	Kelley Rink • Chestnut Hill, Massachusetts (Quarterfinals)		W 4–3 ^{OT}	2,825	20–13–3 (18–6–0)
March 16	5:00 pm	#18 Boston University*	#14	TD Garden • Boston, Massachusetts (Semifinals, Green Line Rivalry)	NESN	L 3–4 ^{OT}	10,871	20–14–3 (18–6–0)
*Non-conference game. ^{#}Rankings from USCHO.com Poll. All times are in Eastern Time. Attendance data from Hockey East

- Sophomore defenseman Michael Campoli left the program on December 19, having not dressed for any game in the 2017–18 season.

== Rankings ==
Poll	Week																									
Poll	Pre	1	2	3	4	5	6	7	8	9	10	11	12	13	14	15	16	17	18	19	20	21	22	23	24	Final
USCHO.com	13	—	13	13	19	RV	RV	RV	14	15	14	14	13	16	16	16	16	18	19	20	18	18	14	17	—	19
USA Today	RV	RV	RV	15	RV	NR	NR	RV	13	RV	14	14	14	RV	RV	RV	15	RV	RV	RV	RV	RV	15	RV	RV	RV

== Statistics ==
=== Skaters ===
No.	Player	POS	YR	GP	G	A	Pts	PIM	PP	SHG	GWG	+/-	SOG
2	Micahel Karow	D	FR	34	0	6	6	22	0	0	0	-2	41
3	Luke McInnis	D	SO	28	0	5	5	34	0	0	0	+3	32
4	Michael Kim	D	JR	37	5	15	20	12	2	0	2	+10	92
5	Casey Fitzgerald	D	JR	36	6	13	19	45	2	0	2	-2	102
7	Connor Moore	D	SO	37	5	12	17	16	2	0	1	+4	49
8	Jesper Mattila	D	SO	35	4	9	13	12	1	0	1	E	45
9	Logan Hutsko	F	FR	37	12	19	31	16	3	0	2	+10	90
10	Chris Brown	F	JR	37	9	10	19	14	4	2	1	-3	86
12	Mike Booth	F	SO	14	1	1	2	2	0	0	0	+1	8
14	Zach Walker	F	SO	31	1	3	4	12	0	0	0	+1	22
15	JD Dudek	F	JR	36	7	12	19	28	0	0	2	-4	79
17	David Cotton	F	SO	37	9	19	28	22	4	0	2	+8	87
18	Casey Carreau	F	FR	33	1	4	5	8	0	0	1	E	30
19	Jacob Tortora	F	FR	34	6	7	13	52	1	0	0	-1	46
20	Mike Merulla	F	SO	1	0	0	0	0	0	0	0	-1	0
21	Christopher Grando	F	FR	37	6	12	18	22	0	2	3	+9	49
22	Aapeli Räsänen	F	FR	32	4	12	16	45	1	0	1	+7	46
24	Kevin Lohan	D	SR	22	2	6	8	10	0	0	0	+14	13
26	Julius Mattila	F	SO	35	13	14	27	18	2	1	0	+5	94
27	Graham McPhee	F	SO	36	12	12	24	47	4	2	2	-1	70
28	Ron Greco	F	SO	37	5	4	9	6	0	0	0	-2	36
29	Ian Milosz	G	JR	0	0	0	0	0	0	0	0	E	0
31	Joe Woll	G	SO	30	0	0	0	19	0	0	0	+12	0
35	Ryan Edquist	G	SO	9	0	1	1	0	0	0	0	+6	0
	Bench							10					
	Team			37	108	196	304	472	26	7	20	+13	1117

=== Goaltenders ===
No.	Player	YR	GS	GP	MIN	W	L	T	GA	GAA	SA	SV	SV%	SO
29	Ian Milosz	JR	0	0	0:00	0	0	0	0	0.00	0	0	1.00	0
31	Joe Woll	SO	30	30	1789:34	17	11	2	74	2.48	867	793	.915	2
25	Ryan Edquist	SO	7	9	459:21	3	3	1	19	2.48	227	208	.916	1
	Empty Net			19	14:50				6		6			
	Team		37	37	2263:45	20	14	3	99	2.62	1100	1001	.910	3

== Awards and honors ==
Hockey East Season Awards

- Logan Hutsko, F – Rookie of the Year
- Jerry York – Coach of the Year
- Casey Fitzgerald, D – Best Defensive Defenseman

Hockey East All Stars

- Casey Fitzgerald, D – Second Team
- Joe Woll, G – Third Team
- Michael Kim, D – Third Team
- Logan Hutsko, F – Rookie Team

Hockey East Rookie of the Month

- Christopher Grando, F – Month of November
- Logan Hutsko, F – Month of February

Hockey East Player of the Week

- Christopher Grando, F – Week of November 6, 2017
- Kevin Lohan, D – Week of February 26, 2018

Hockey East Rookie of the Week

- Logan Hutsko, F – Week of February 12, 2018

Hockey East Defensive Player of the Week

- Casey Fitzgerald, D – Week of October 16, 2017
- Joe Woll, G – Week of November 20, 2017, Week of February 19, 2018
