= Jake Oettinger =

American ice hockey player (born 1998)

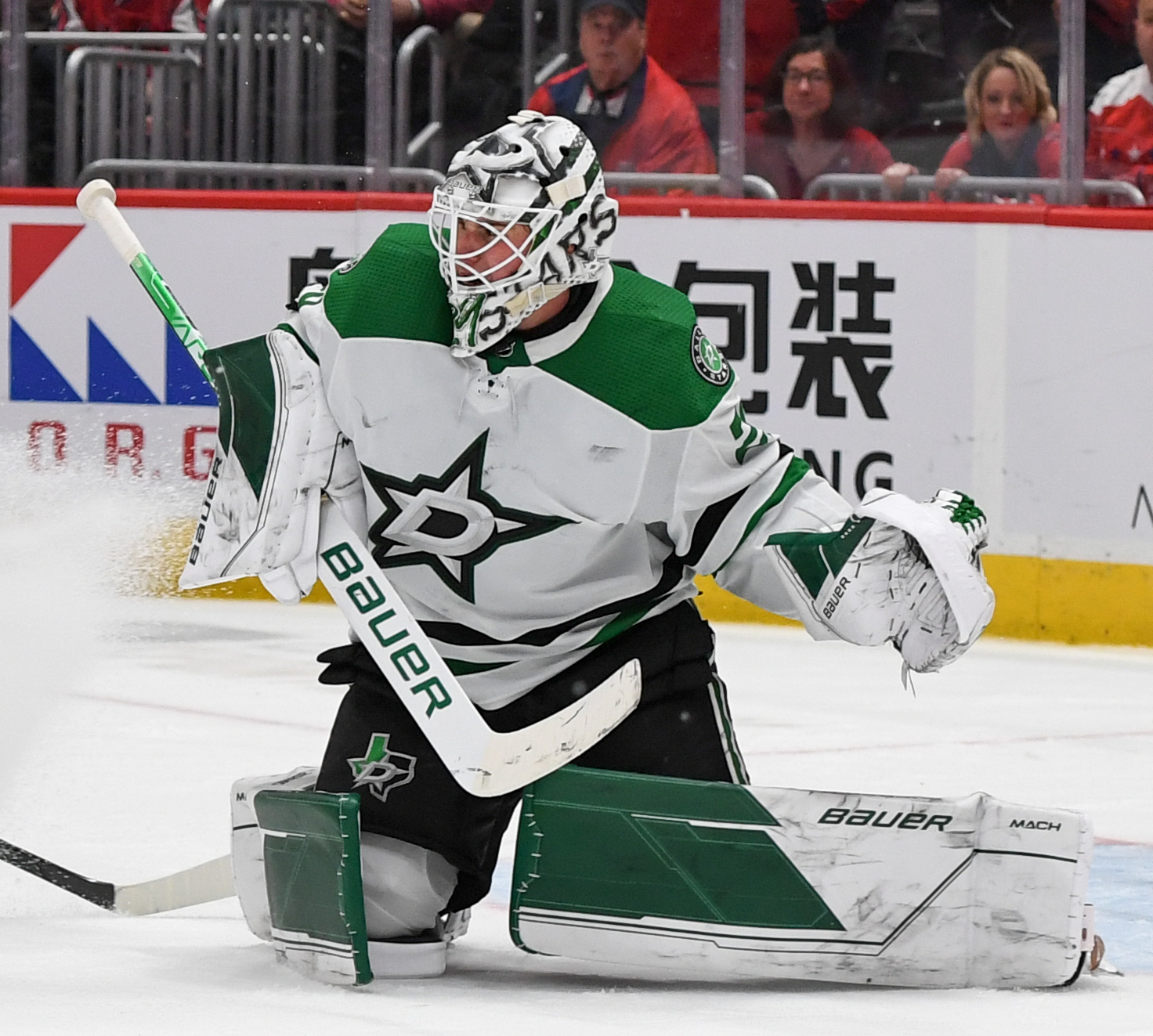
- Oettinger with the Dallas Stars in March 2022
- Born: December 18, 1998 (age 27) Lakeville, Minnesota, U.S.
- Height: 6 ft 6 in (198 cm)
- Weight: 225 lb (102 kg; 16 st 1 lb)
- Position: Goaltender
- Catches: Left
- NHL team: Dallas Stars
- National team: United States
- NHL draft: 26th overall, 2017; Dallas Stars
- Playing career: 2019–present

Jakob Donald Oettinger (/ˈɒtɪndʒər/ OT-in-jer; born December 18, 1998) is an American professional ice hockey player who is a goaltender for the Dallas Stars of the National Hockey League (NHL). He played college ice hockey for Boston University. After being part of the USA Hockey National Team Development Program, he was widely considered as a top prospect for the 2017 NHL entry draft, and was ultimately selected by the Stars in the first round, 26th overall, of the 2017 draft.

== Early life ==
Oettinger was born on December 18, 1998, in Lakeville, Minnesota, to Kateri and Chris Oettinger. Growing up, Oettinger looked up to Henrik Lundqvist, who inspired him to play goalie. He attended Lakeville North High School, where he "accelerated his academics", graduating from high school in little over two years. He enrolled in the Boston University College of Communication.

== Playing career ==
After spending his freshman year at Lakeville North High School, Oettinger committed to the USA Hockey National Team Development Program (USNTDP) Juniors for the 2014–15 season. Oettinger played two seasons with the USNTDP Juniors while committing to Boston University. He was drafted in the first round, 26th overall, of the 2017 NHL entry draft by the Dallas Stars.

=== Collegiate ===
During his freshman season at Boston University, Oettinger posted a 2.11 goals-against average and .927 save-percentage. During that season, Oettinger was named Hockey East Goaltender of the Month for the month of October, was a two-time Hockey East Rookie of the Week, a two-time Hockey East Defensive Player of the Week and was named Hockey East Top Performer four times. Thus, he was named to the Hockey East All-Rookie Team and Hockey East Second Team All-Star at the end of the year. During his second season at Boston University, Oettinger was named to the Hockey East All-Tournament Team of the 2018 Hockey East Men's Ice Hockey Tournament and earned the William Flynn Tournament Most Valuable Player award after he helped Boston win their ninth Hockey East Tournament title. Prior to the 2018–19 season, Oettinger was named an alternate captain for the Terriers, along with Chad Krys.

=== Professional ===
On March 25, 2019, Oettinger signed a three-year, entry-level contract with the Dallas Stars and was assigned to their American Hockey League (AHL) affiliate, the Texas Stars, on an amateur tryout contract. Upon joining the Texas Stars, Oettinger recorded a .897 save percentage and a 3.34 goals-against average in his first eight games. On March 3, 2020, he earned his first NHL call up as Ben Bishop dealt with a lower-body injury. He served as Anton Khudobin's backup during the 2020 Stanley Cup playoffs. On September 8, he made his NHL debut in relief of Khudobin in the third period of the second game of the Western Conference finals against the Vegas Golden Knights. With Bishop remaining unavailable during the following 2020–21 season, Oettinger became the Stars' backup goaltender to Khudobin, making his regular season debut on January 28, 2021, in a 7–3 victory over the Detroit Red Wings. Over the course of the season he made 24 starts and appeared in relief a further five times, gradually edging ahead of Khudobin as the team's starting goaltender. He finished with a .911 save percentage.

Oettinger began the 2021–22 season playing in the AHL, appearing in 10 games with a 4–5–2 record. However, he was soon called up to play in the NHL again, with injuries plaguing the team's other goaltenders. He became the starter on arrival, and earned a 30–15–1 record with a .914 save percentage in the regular season, credited as a key factor in the Stars qualifying for the 2022 Stanley Cup playoffs. The Stars earned the final wild card berth and drew the Calgary Flames in the first round, a matchup where they were considered underdogs. However, the series proved far more competitive than expected, a fact that was widely attributed to Oettinger, who was dubbed "bar none, the first star of the first round" by The Hockey News. Oettinger led all goaltenders in the first round with a .954 save percentage, also the second-highest in the history of the Stars, behind only Ed Belfour during the 1998 conference semifinals. The climax came in game seven, where the Stars took the game to overtime despite the Flames making twice as many shots and attempts as the Stars, with Oettinger recording 64 saves, the second-highest in a game 7 behind only Kelly Hrudey's 73 during the 1987 Easter Epic. The Stars were eliminated when Flames' forward Johnny Gaudreau finally scored in overtime to end the game 3–2, with Oettinger commenting afterward that he felt he was "just scratching the surface of where I'm going to be one day". After his performance in the playoffs, he would establish himself as the Stars' main goaltender for the following season.

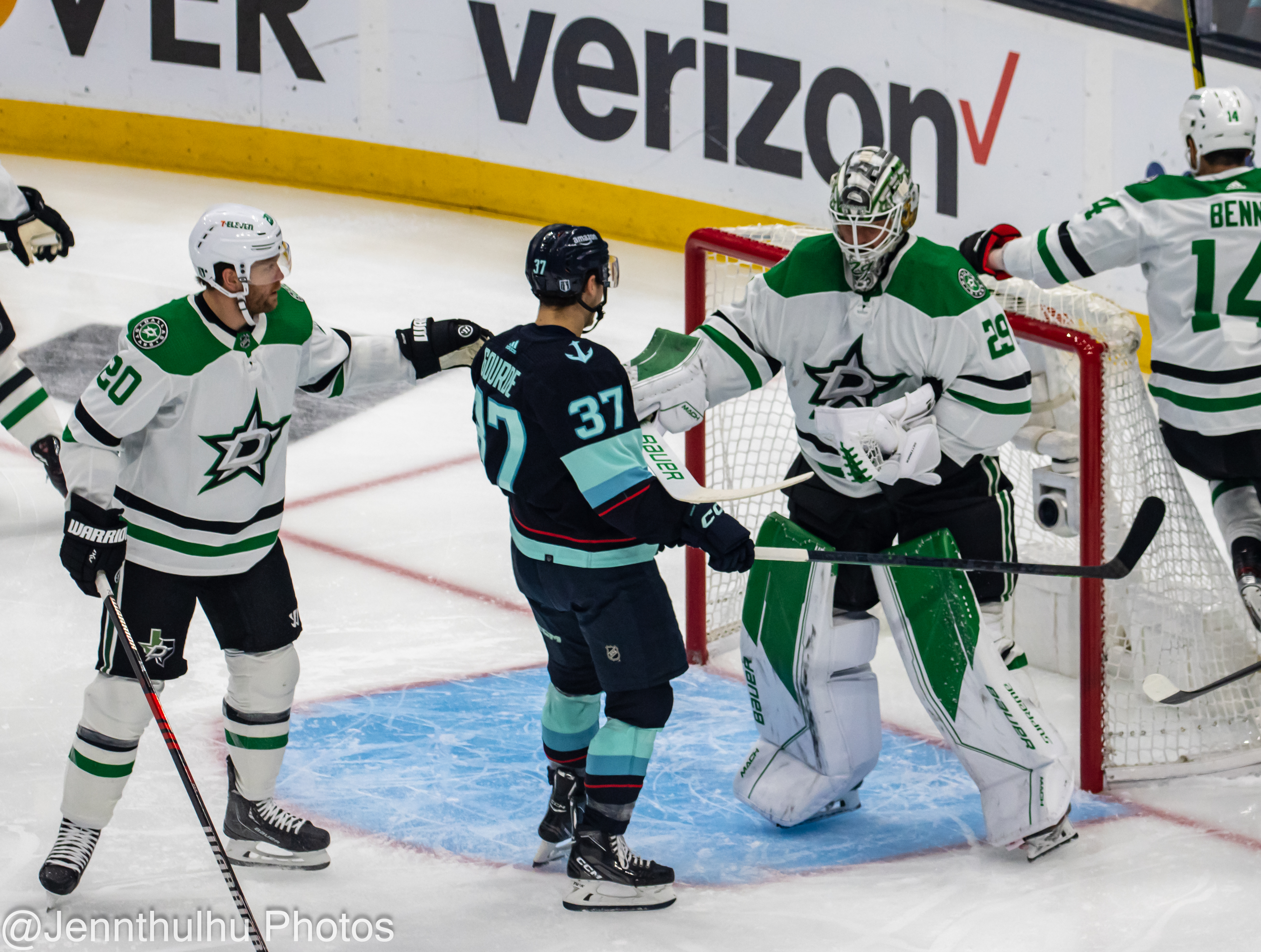
Oettinger pushes Yanni Gourde of the Seattle Kraken during the 2023 Stanley Cup playoffs.

On September 1, 2022, Oettinger signed a three-year, $12 million contract with the Stars. He began the 2022–23 season impressively, with a 5–1–0 record and a .960 save percentage over those games, before exiting an October 29 game against the New York Rangers with an unspecified lower-body injury. He returned to the Stars' active roster two weeks later. He finished that season with a 37–11–11 record and .919 save percentage. He posted his second career shutout during the 2023 Stanley Cup playoffs in game five against the Minnesota Wild. The team went on to beat them in game six, moving onto the second round with a 4–1 victory. The Stars advanced to the conference finals after beating the Seattle Kraken in a seven-game series. Their season came to end after losing in a six game series against the Vegas Golden Knights. Oettinger finished that playoffs with a 10–9–0 record, .895 save percentage and a goals-against average of 3.06. Following the team's playoff exit, Oettinger required off-season surgery on his ankle.

Oettinger struggled early on in the 2023–24 season, however, he went 35–14–4 that season and finished with a .905 save percentage and 2.72 goals-against average. He represented the team at the 2024 NHL All-Star Game. After losing game one to the Vegas Golden Knights in the first round of the 2024 Stanley Cup playoffs, he had gone 8–4 and recorded a save percentage above .940. Oettinger made 22 saves for the Stars and Radek Faksa provided the game-winning goal to send the Stars to the second round with a 2–1 victory. The team beat the Colorado Avalanche in six games, as Oettinger stopped 30 of 31 shots, helping the team advance to the conference finals. However, the Stars lost to the Edmonton Oilers in six games in the series.

Oettinger earned his first shutout in the 2024–25 season, during the Stars' home opener against the New York Islanders, winning the game 3–0. On October 17, 2024, he signed an eight-year, $66 million contract extension. He was also selected as one of the United States' goaltenders for the 4 Nations Face-Off. He played one game in the tournament, which resulted in a 2–1 loss against Sweden. He recorded a .913 save percentage and a goals-against average of 2.06. The Stars faced the Avalanche in the first round of the 2025 Stanley Cup playoffs, beating the team in seven games. They then played against the Winnipeg Jets in the following round, winning the series in six games. Through two rounds, he recorded a .918 save percentage. Oettinger was pulled in game five against the Edmonton Oilers of the conference finals after giving up two goals on two shots, as the team went on to the lose the series.

== International play ==
Medal record

Men's ice hockey

Representing the United States

Olympic Games
Gold medal – first place	2026 Milano Cortina	

World Championships
Bronze medal – third place	2021 Latvia	

World Junior Championships
Gold medal – first place	2017 Canada	
Bronze medal – third place	2018 United States	

On January 2, 2026, he was named to the United States roster for the 2026 Winter Olympics. Amid backlash faced by the men's Olympic hockey team regarding the inclusion of FBI director Kash Patel during their gold medal celebrations and members of the team laughing at President Trump's comments of being impeached if he did not invite the women's team to the White House, the players were invited to the White House and the State of the Union. Oettinger did not attend the State of the Union or participate in the White House visit. Oettinger attributed his absence to having been away from his then three-month-old baby while the team spent a month in Italy for the Olympics and to wanting to prepare to play again; despite winning a gold medal with the team, he was the backup to Connor Hellebuyck and did not play in any games during the tournament.

== Career statistics ==
=== Regular season and playoffs ===
			Regular season									Playoffs
Season	Team	League	GP	W	L	T/OT	MIN	GA	SO	GAA	SV%	GP	W	L	MIN	GA	SO	GAA	SV%
2013–14	Lakeville North High	SSC	9	7	2	1	465	17	2	1.86	.931	5	4	1	262	13	1	2.53	.886
2014–15	U.S. National Development Team	USHL	20	5	10	0	1,058	57	1	3.23	.907	—	—	—	—	—	—	—	—
2015–16	U.S. National Development Team	USHL	15	11	3	0	858	32	1	2.24	.919	—	—	—	—	—	—	—	—
2016–17	Boston University	HE	35	21	11	3	2,131	75	4	2.11	.927	—	—	—	—	—	—	—	—
2017–18	Boston University	HE	38	21	13	4	2,325	95	5	2.45	.915	—	—	—	—	—	—	—	—
2018–19	Boston University	HE	36	16	16	4	2,110	86	4	2.45	.926	—	—	—	—	—	—	—	—
2018–19	Texas Stars	AHL	6	3	2	1	364	15	0	2.47	.895	—	—	—	—	—	—	—	—
2019–20	Texas Stars	AHL	38	15	16	4	2,104	90	3	2.57	.917	—	—	—	—	—	—	—	—
2019–20	Dallas Stars	NHL	—	—	—	—	—	—	—	—	—	2	0	0	37	0	0	0.00	1.000
2020–21	Dallas Stars	NHL	29	11	8	7	1,605	63	1	2.36	.911	—	—	—	—	—	—	—	—
2021–22	Dallas Stars	NHL	48	30	15	1	2,708	114	1	2.53	.914	7	3	4	430	13	1	1.81	.954
2022–23	Dallas Stars	NHL	62	37	11	11	3,645	144	5	2.37	.919	19	10	9	1,078	55	1	3.06	.895
2023–24	Dallas Stars	NHL	54	35	14	4	3,085	140	3	2.72	.905	19	10	9	1,207	45	0	2.24	.913
2024–25	Dallas Stars	NHL	58	36	18	4	3,410	147	2	2.59	.909	18	9	8	1,021	48	0	2.82	.905
2025–26	Dallas Stars	NHL	54	35	12	6	3,194	138	4	2.59	.899	6	2	4	403	19	0	2.83	.893
NHL totals			305	184	78	33	17,645	746	16	2.54	.912	71	34	34	4,176	180	2	2.59	.911

=== International ===
Year	Team	Event	Result	GP	W	L	OT	MIN	GA	SO	GAA	SV%
2014	United States	U17	2nd place, silver medalist(s)	3	2	1	0	178	4	0	1.34	.934
2015	United States	U18	1st place, gold medalist(s)	—	—	—	—	—	—	—	—	—
2016	United States	U18	3rd place, bronze medalist(s)	4	4	0	0	240	6	1	1.50	.934
2017	United States	WJC	1st place, gold medalist(s)	—	—	—	—	—	—	—	—	—
2018	United States	WJC	3rd place, bronze medalist(s)	3	2	0	0	130	6	0	2.77	.889
2021	United States	WC	3rd place, bronze medalist(s)	3	3	0	0	175	4	0	1.37	.934
2025	United States	4NF	2nd	1	0	1	0	58	2	0	2.06	.913
Junior totals				10	8	1	0	448	16	1	2.14	.927
Senior totals				4	3	1	0	233	6	0	1.55	.929

== Awards and honors ==
Award	Year	Ref
College
All-Hockey East Rookie Team	2017	
All-Hockey East Second Team All-Star	2017	
Hockey East All-Tournament Team	2018	
William Flynn Tournament Most Valuable Player	2018	
NHL
NHL All-Star Game	2024	

Awards and achievements
Preceded by Miro Heiskanen	Dallas Stars first-round draft pick 2017	Succeeded by Ty Dellandrea
Preceded by C. J. Smith	Hockey East Tournament MVP; 2018	Succeeded by Cayden Primeau
