= 2017–18 NCAA Division I men's ice hockey rankings =

- NCAA tournament: 2018
- NCAA champion: Minnesota–Duluth
- Preseason No. 1 (USA Today): Denver
- Preseason No. 1 (USCHO): Denver
- NCAA Division I men's ice hockey rankings

Two human polls made up the 2017–18 NCAA Division I men's ice hockey rankings, the USCHO.com/CBS College Sports poll and the USA Today/USA Hockey Magazine poll. As the 2017–18 season progressed, rankings were updated weekly.

== Legend ==
	Increase in ranking
	Decrease in ranking
	Not ranked previous week
Italics	Number of first place votes
(#-#)	Win–loss–tie record
т	Tied with team above or below also with this symbol

== USCHO ==
	Preseason Sep 25	Week 2 Oct 9	Week 3 Oct 16	Week 4 Oct 23	Week 5 Oct 30	Week 6 Nov 6	Week 7 Nov 13	Week 8 Nov 20	Week 9 Nov 27	Week 10 Dec 4	Week 11 Dec 11	Week 12 Jan 2	Week 13 Jan 8	Week 14 Jan 15	Week 15 Jan 22	Week 16 Jan 29	Week 17 Feb 5	Week 18 Feb 12	Week 19 Feb 19	Week 20 Feb 26	Week 21 Mar 5	Week 22 Mar 12	Week 23 Mar 19	Final Apr 9	
1.	Denver (48)	Denver (0–0–0) (45)	Denver (1–0–1) (49)	Denver (2–0–2) (33)	Denver (4–0–2) (42)	St. Cloud State (7–0–0) (50)	Denver (6–2–2) (43)	Denver (7–3–2) (30)	Denver (7–3–2) (39)	Denver (9–3–2) (39)	St. Cloud State (12–2–1) (35)	St. Cloud State (12–2–3) (33)	Notre Dame (18–3–1) (40)	Notre Dame (18–3–1) (44)	Notre Dame (19–4–1) (33)	Cornell (18–2–1) (32)	Notre Dame (21–5–2) (36)	Notre Dame (22–6–2) (15)	St. Cloud State (20–6–4) (28)	St. Cloud State (21–6–5) (47)	St. Cloud State (22–6–6) (44)	St. Cloud State (24–7–6) (32)	St. Cloud State (25–8–6) (28)	Minnesota-Duluth (25–16–3) (50)	1.
2.	Boston University	Boston University (2–0–0) (5)	Harvard (0–0–0)	St. Cloud State (5–0–0) (16)	St. Cloud State (5–0–0) (8)	North Dakota (6–2–2)	St. Cloud State (7–2–0) (1)	St. Cloud State (9–2–0) (18)	St. Cloud State (9–2–0) (9)	St. Cloud State (11–2–0) (9)	Denver (9–3–4) (8)	Notre Dame (16–3–1) (14)	St. Cloud State (13–3–3) (6)	Clarkson (18–3–1) (5)	Cornell (16–2–1) (15)	Notre Dame (20–5–1) (17)	Denver (16–6–6) (8)	Denver (16–6–6) (15)	Cornell (22–3–2) (18)	Cornell (23–4–2) (2)	Cornell (23–4–2) (5)	Cornell (25–4–2) (16)	Notre Dame (25–9–2) (14)	Notre Dame (28–10–2)	2.
3.	Minnesota	Harvard (0–0–0)	St. Cloud State (3–0–0) (1)	Harvard (0–0–0) (1)	Harvard (1–0–0)	Denver (4–2–2)	North Dakota (7–2–3) (2)	North Dakota (8–3–3) (2)	Clarkson (12–3–1) (1)	Clarkson (13–3–1) (1)	Notre Dame (16–3–1) (6)	Clarkson (15–3–1) (1)	Clarkson (16–3–1) (3)	St. Cloud State (14–4–3) (1)	Clarkson (18–4–2) (1)	Clarkson (19–4–3)	Cornell (19–3–1) (4)	St. Cloud State (19–6–3) (13)	Denver (17–7–6) (3)	Minnesota State (26–7–1) (1)	Minnesota State (28–7–1) (1)	Notre Dame (24–9–2) (1)	Denver (22–9–8) (7)	Ohio State (26–10–5)	3.
4.	Harvard (1)	Notre Dame (2–0–0)	North Dakota (3–0–1)	North Dakota (4–1–1)	North Dakota (5–2–1)	Minnesota (7–3–0)	Notre Dame (8–3–1)	Notre Dame (10–3–1)	Notre Dame (12–3–1) (1)	Notre Dame (14–3–1) (1)	Clarkson (15–3–1) (1)	Denver (11–5–4) (1)	Cornell (13–2–0) (1)	Cornell (14–2–1)	Denver (14–6–4) (1)	Denver (14–6–6) (1)	St. Cloud State (17–6–3) (2)	Cornell (20–3–2) (7)	Minnesota State (25–7–0) (1)	Denver (17–8–7)	Denver (18–8–8)	Denver (20–9–8) (1)	Cornell (25–5–2) (1)	Michigan (22–15–3)	4.
5.	UMass Lowell	Minnesota-Duluth (1–1–0)	Notre Dame (2–1–1)	Wisconsin (5–2–0)	Minnesota (5–3–0)	Harvard (2–1–0)	Minnesota State (8–3–0)	Clarkson (10–3–1)	Cornell (9–1–0)	North Dakota (10–4–4)	Cornell (10–2–0)	Cornell (11–2–0) (1)	Denver (12–6–4)	Denver (12–6–4)	St. Cloud State (14–5–3)	Ohio State (17–5–4)	Minnesota State (21–7–0)	Minnesota State (23–7–0)	Notre Dame (22–8–2)	Notre Dame (23–9–2)	Notre Dame (23–9–2)	Ohio State (24–8–5)	Ohio State (24–9–5)	Denver (23–10–8)	5.
6.	Minnesota-Duluth (1)	St. Cloud State (1–0–0)	Wisconsin (4–1–0)	Boston University (3–2–1)	Providence (5–2–0)	Notre Dame (6–3–1)	Cornell (6–0–0) (4)	Minnesota (9–4–1)	North Dakota (8–4–4)	Cornell (10–2–0)	North Dakota (10–5–5)	North Dakota (10–5–5)	Ohio State (14–4–4)	Ohio State (15–5–4)	Ohio State (15–5–4)	St. Cloud State (15–6–3)	Ohio State (18–6–4)	Ohio State (19–7–4)	Ohio State (19–8–5)	Ohio State (21–8–5)	Ohio State (23–8–5)	Minnesota State (29–9–1)	Minnesota State (29–9–1)	St. Cloud State (25–9–6)	6.
7.	North Dakota	Minnesota (1–1–0)	Boston University (2–2–0)	Minnesota (3–3–0)	Wisconsin (6–3–0)	Wisconsin (6–4–1)	Minnesota (7–4–1)	Cornell (7–1–0)	Minnesota (9–6–1)	Minnesota (10–7–1)	Minnesota State (11–5–0)	Minnesota State (14–6–0)	North Dakota (11–6–5)	North Dakota (12–6–6)	Minnesota State (18–7–0)	Minnesota State (19–7–0)	Clarkson (19–6–3)	Clarkson (19–6–5)	Providence (20–9–4)	Minnesota-Duluth (18–13–3)	Northeastern (21–8–5)	Northeastern (23–8–5)	Providence (23–11–4)	Providence (24–12–4)	7.
8.	Notre Dame	North Dakota (1–0–1)	Minnesota (2–2–0)	Notre Dame (3–2–1)	Minnesota-Duluth (4–2–2)	Providence (5–3–0)	Clarkson (8–3–1)	Minnesota State (9–4–0)	Minnesota State (9–5–0)	Minnesota State (9–5–0)	Northeastern (10–5–1)	Ohio State (12–4–4)	Minnesota State (16–6–0)	Northeastern (14–5–3)	Northeastern (15–6–3)	Providence (17–8–3)	North Dakota (12–8–8)	Providence (18–9–4)	Minnesota (19–13–2)	Northeastern (21–8–5)	Minnesota-Duluth (19–14–3)	Minnesota-Duluth (21–14–3)	Northeastern (23–9–5)	Cornell (25–6–2)	8.
9.	St. Cloud State	Providence (2–0–0)	Minnesota-Duluth (1–2–1)	Clarkson (4–1–1)	Minnesota State (5–2–0)	New Hampshire (6–1–1)	Wisconsin (7–5–1)	Wisconsin (8–5–2)	Providence (8–5–1)	Providence (9–6–1)	Ohio State (10–4–4)	Northeastern (11–5–2)	Minnesota (13–10–1)	Minnesota State (17–7–0)	Minnesota-Duluth (13–9–3)	Minnesota-Duluth (14–11–3)	Providence (17–9–4)	North Dakota (13–9–8)	Minnesota-Duluth (16–13–3)	Providence (20–10–4)	Providence (20–10–4)	Providence (22–10–4)	Clarkson (23–10–6)	Minnesota State (29–10–1)	9.
10.	Penn State	Wisconsin (2–1–0)	Providence (2–1–0)	Minnesota-Duluth (2–2–2)	Notre Dame (4–3–1)	Minnesota State (6–3–0)	Providence (6–4–0)	Providence (7–4–1)	Western Michigan (9–5–1)	Northeastern (9–5–1)	Minnesota (10–9–1)	Minnesota (12–9–1)	Northeastern (12–5–3)	Providence (15–7–2)	Providence (16–8–2)	North Dakota (12–8–8)	Minnesota-Duluth (14–13–3)	Minnesota (13–13–1)	Clarkson (19–8–5)	Clarkson (20–8–6)	Clarkson (20–8–6)	Clarkson (22–9–6)	Michigan (20–14–3)	Boston University (22–14–4)	10.
11.	Providence	Penn State (1–1–0)	Penn State (2–2–0)	Providence (3–2–0)	Quinnipiac (3–1–1)	Clarkson (6–3–1)	New Hampshire (6–3–1)	Western Michigan (8–4–1)	Ohio State (8–3–3)	Western Michigan (9–7–1)	Providence (10–7–1)	Providence (12–7–1)	Providence (14–7–1)	Western Michigan (12–9–1)	North Dakota (12–8–6)	Northeastern (15–7–4)	Northeastern (15–7–5)	Minnesota-Duluth (14–13–3)	Northeastern (19–8–5)	Minnesota (19–15–2)	Michigan (20–13–3)	Michigan (20–14–3)	Minnesota-Duluth (21–16–3)	Northeastern (23–10–5)	11.
12.	Wisconsin	UMass Lowell (0–2–0)	Clarkson (2–1–0)	Minnesota State (3–2–0)	Boston University (3–4–1)	Minnesota-Duluth (4–4–2)	Northeastern (6–3–1)	Northeastern (7–4–1)	Northeastern (7–4–1)	Wisconsin (10–7–2)	Western Michigan (10–8–1)	Western Michigan (11–8–1)	Western Michigan (11–8–1)	Penn State (13–8–3)	Western Michigan (13–10–1)	Minnesota (16–13–1)	Minnesota (16–13–1)	Northeastern (16–8–5)	North Dakota (14–10–8)	Michigan (18–13–3)	Penn State (18–13–5)	North Dakota (16–12–10)	Penn State (18–14–5)	Clarkson (23–11–6)	12.
13.	Boston College	Boston College (0–0–1)	Boston College (1–1–1)	Quinnipiac (3–1–1)	Clarkson (4–3–1) т	Northeastern (5–2–1)	Harvard (2–3–0)	New Hampshire (6–4–1)	New Hampshire (7–4–1)	New Hampshire (8–5–1)	Wisconsin (10–9–2)	Boston College (10–7–2)	Penn State (12–7–2)	Minnesota (13–12–1)	Minnesota (15–12–1)	Omaha (14–11–1)	Omaha (14–13–1)	Omaha (14–13–1)	Michigan (16–13–3)	North Dakota (14–11–9)	Omaha (17–15–2)	Penn State (18–14–5)	Boston University (21–13–4)	Penn State (18–15–5)	13.
14.	Quinnipiac	Northeastern (2–0–0)	Minnesota State (2–1–0)	New Hampshire (5–1–0)	New Hampshire (5–1–1) т	Cornell (4–0–0)	Minnesota-Duluth (5–5–2)	Boston College (8–5–1)	Wisconsin (9–6–2)	Boston College (9–6–2)	Boston College (9–7–2)	Penn State (11–7–2)	Bowling Green (12–6–6)	Minnesota-Duluth (11–9–3)	Penn State (13–10–3)	Bowling Green (16–8–6)	Bowling Green (17–9–6)	Bowling Green (17–9–6)	Omaha (15–14–1)	Omaha (16–14–2)	North Dakota (14–12–10)	Boston College (20–13–3)	North Dakota (17–13–10)	Air Force (23–15–5)	14.
15.	Cornell	Clarkson (2–0–0)	Michigan Tech (3–1–1)	Penn State (3–3–0)	Northeastern (4–2–1)	Boston University (4–5–1)	Western Michigan (6–4–1)	Ohio State (6–3–3)	Boston College (8–5–2)	Ohio State (8–4–4)	Penn State (11–7–2)	Wisconsin (10–9–2)	Minnesota-Duluth (9–9–3)	Omaha (12–9–1)	Bowling Green (14–8–6)	Western Michigan (13–12–1)	Western Michigan (14–13–1)	Western Michigan (14–13–1)	Bowling Green (19–9–6)	Penn State (16–13–5)	Minnesota (19–17–2)	Minnesota (19–17–2)	Minnesota (19–17–2)	Princeton (19–13–4)	15.
16.	Union	Michigan Tech (2–1–0)	Northeastern (2–0–1)	Michigan Tech (4–2–1)	Ohio State (5–1–2)	Quinnipiac (3–3–1)	Ohio State (6–3–3)	Minnesota-Duluth (6–6–2)	Minnesota-Duluth (7–6–2)	Colgate (8–5–4)	New Hampshire (9–7–1)	Minnesota-Duluth (9–9–3)	Boston College (10–8–3)	Boston College (11–9–3)	Boston College (11–9–3)	Boston College (13–10–3)	Penn State (13–12–5)	Penn State (13–12–5)	Northern Michigan (20–11–3)	Union (21–13–2)	Union (21–13–2)	Northern Michigan (25–14–3)	Princeton (19–12–4)	Michigan Tech (22–17–5)	16.
17.	Air Force	Quinnipiac (0–1–1)	New Hampshire (4–0–0)	UMass Lowell (3–3–0)	Penn State (4–4–0)	Ohio State (5–3–2)	Michigan (6–3–1)	Michigan (6–4–2)	Colgate (8–4–4)	Minnesota-Duluth (7–8–2)	Minnesota-Duluth (8–9–2)	Colgate (8–6–4)	Omaha (10–9–1)	Bowling Green (12–8–6)	Michigan (12–10–2)	Penn State (13–11–4)	Wisconsin (14–13–4)	Northern Michigan (20–11–3)	Western Michigan (14–14–2)	Bowling Green (20–10–6)	Bowling Green (22–10–6)	Omaha (17–17–2)	Boston College (20–14–3)	North Dakota (17–13–10)	17.
18.	Minnesota State	Cornell (0–0–0)	Quinnipiac (1–1–1)	Air Force (4–1–1)	Cornell (2–0–0)	Western Michigan (5–3–1)	Boston University (5–6–1)	Colgate (7–3–4)	UMass Lowell (8–6–0)	Penn State (9–7–2)	Colgate (8–6–4)	Omaha (9–8–1)	Wisconsin (10–10–3)	Wisconsin (11–11–3)	Wisconsin (12–12–3)	Wisconsin (13–12–4)	Boston College (13–11–3)	Michigan (13–13–3)	Penn State (14–13–5)	Boston College (18–13–3)	Boston College (18–13–3)	Boston University (19–13–4)	Michigan Tech (22–16–5)	Minnesota (19–17–2)	18.
19.	Ohio State	Air Force (1–0–1)	UMass Lowell (1–3–0)	Boston College (1–3–1)	Air Force (5–2–1)	Penn State (5–5–0)	Colgate (6–2–4)	Boston University (6–7–1) т	Union (8–6–1)	Union (9–7–1)	Union (10–8–1)	Bowling Green (9–6–6)	Colgate (9–7–4)	Colgate (10–8–4)	Omaha (12–11–1)	Northern Michigan (17–10–3)	Michigan (13–13–2)	Boston College (14–12–3)	Union (20–13–1)	Northern Michigan (21–12–3)	Northern Michigan (23–13–3)	Bowling Green (23–12–6)	Northern Michigan (25–15–3)	Boston College (20–14–3)	19.
20.	Northeastern т Western Michigan т	New Hampshire (2–0–0)	Air Force (3–0–1)	Northeastern (2–2–1)	Michigan Tech (4–4–1)	Northern Michigan (5–3–0)	Northern Michigan (6–4–0)	UMass Lowell (8–6–0) т	Omaha (6–5–1)	Niagara (9–5–1)	Canisius (10–5–1)	New Hampshire (9–9–1)	Maine (11–7–1) т Miami (9–9–2) т	Michigan (10–10–2)	Northern Michigan (15–10–3)	Michigan (12–12–2)	Northern Michigan (18–11–3)	Boston University (15–11–3)	Boston College (16–13–3)	Boston University (17–13–4)	Boston University (17–13–4)	Union (21–15–2)	Omaha (17–17–2)	Northern Michigan (25–15–3)	20.
	Preseason Sep 25	Week 2 Oct 9	Week 3 Oct 16	Week 4 Oct 23	Week 5 Oct 30	Week 6 Nov 6	Week 7 Nov 13	Week 8 Nov 20	Week 9 Nov 27	Week 10 Dec 4	Week 11 Dec 11	Week 12 Jan 2	Week 13 Jan 8	Week 14 Jan 15	Week 15 Jan 22	Week 16 Jan 29	Week 17 Feb 5	Week 18 Feb 12	Week 19 Feb 19	Week 20 Feb 26	Week 21 Mar 5	Week 22 Mar 12	Week 23 Mar 19	Final Apr 9	
		Dropped: Union; Minnesota State; Ohio State; Western Michigan	Dropped: Cornell	None	Dropped: UMass Lowell; Boston College	Dropped: Air Force; Michigan Tech	Dropped: Quinnipiac; Penn State	Dropped: Harvard; Northern Michigan	Dropped: Michigan; Boston University	Dropped: UMass Lowell; Omaha	Dropped: Niagara	Dropped: Union; Canisius	Dropped: New Hampshire	Dropped: Maine; Miami	Dropped: Colgate	None	None	Dropped: Wisconsin	Dropped: Boston University	Dropped: Western Michigan	None	None	Dropped: Bowling Green; Union	Dropped: Omaha	

== USA Today ==
	Preseason Sep 25	Week 1 Oct 2	Week 2 Oct 9	Week 3 Oct 16	Week 4 Oct 23	Week 5 Oct 30	Week 6 Nov 6	Week 7 Nov 13	Week 8 Nov 20	Week 9 Nov 27	Week 10 Dec 4	Week 11 Dec 11	Week 12 Jan 2	Week 13 Jan 8	Week 14 Jan 15	Week 15 Jan 22	Week 16 Jan 29	Week 17 Feb 5	Week 18 Feb 12	Week 19 Feb 19	Week 20 Feb 26	Week 21 Mar 5	Week 22 Mar 12	Week 23 Mar 19	Week 24 Mar 26	Final Apr 9	
1.	Denver (34)	Denver (0–0–0) (34)	Denver (0–0–0) (34)	Denver (1–0–1) (34)	Denver (2–0–2) (28)	Denver (4–0–2) (34)	St. Cloud State (7–0–0) (34)	Denver (6–2–2) (25)	Denver (7–3–2) (20)	Denver (7–3–2) (32)	Denver (9–3–2) (30)	St. Cloud State (12–2–1) (27)	Notre Dame (16–3–1)	Notre Dame (18–3–1) (26)	Notre Dame (18–3–1) (29)	Notre Dame (19–4–1) (27)	Cornell (18–2–1) (20)	Notre Dame (21–5–2) (26)	Notre Dame (22–6–2) (14)	St. Cloud State (20–6–4) (26)	St. Cloud State (21–6–5) (34)	St. Cloud State (22–6–6) (28)	St. Cloud State (24–7–6) (20)	St. Cloud State (25–8–6) (21)	Notre Dame (27–9–2) (33)	Minnesota-Duluth (25–16–3) (34)	1.
2.	Boston University	Boston University (1–0–0)	Boston University (2–0–0)	St. Cloud State (3–0–0)	St. Cloud State (5–0–0) (6)	St. Cloud State (5–0–0)	Minnesota (7–3–0)	St. Cloud State (7–2–0) (1)	St. Cloud State (9–2–0) (9)	St. Cloud State (9–2–0) (1)	St. Cloud State (11–2–0) (3)	Denver (9–3–4) (3)	St. Cloud State (12–2–3)	St. Cloud State (13–3–3) (2)	Clarkson (18–3–1) (3)	Clarkson (18–4–2) (7)	Notre Dame (20–5–1) (14)	Denver (16–6–6) (6)	St. Cloud State (19–6–3) (13)	Cornell (22–3–2) (8)	Cornell (23–4–2)	Cornell (23–4–2) (6)	Cornell (25–4–2) (14)	Notre Dame (25–9–2) (13)	Ohio State (26–9–5) (1)	Notre Dame (28–10–2)	2.
3.	Minnesota	Minnesota (0–0–0)	Harvard (0–0–0)	Harvard (0–0–0)	Harvard (0–0–0)	Harvard (1–0–0)	Denver (4–2–2)	North Dakota (7–2–3) (3)	North Dakota (8–3–3)	Notre Dame (12–3–1) (1)	Clarkson (13–3–1) (1)	Notre Dame (16–3–1) (3)	Clarkson (15–3–1)	Clarkson (16–3–1) (2)	St. Cloud State (14–4–3) (2)	St. Cloud State (14–5–3)	Clarkson (19–4–3)	St. Cloud State (17–6–3)	Denver (16–6–6) (6)	Notre Dame (22–8–2)	Minnesota State (26–7–1)	Minnesota State (28–7–1)	Notre Dame (24–9–2)	Cornell (25–5–2)	Minnesota-Duluth (23–16–3)	Ohio State (26–10–5)	3.
4.	Harvard	Harvard (0–0–0)	St. Cloud State (1–0–0)	North Dakota (3–0–1)	North Dakota (4–1–1)	Minnesota (5–3–0)	North Dakota (6–2–2)	Notre Dame (8–3–1)	Notre Dame (10–3–1)	Clarkson (12–3–1)	Notre Dame (14–3–1)	Clarkson (15–3–1) (1)	Cornell (11–2–0)	Cornell (13–2–0) (2)	Cornell (14–2–1)	Cornell (16–2–1)	St. Cloud State (15–6–3)	Cornell (19–3–1) (2)	Cornell (20–3–2) (1)	Denver (17–7–6)	Notre Dame (23–9–2)	Notre Dame (23–9–2)	Ohio State (24–8–5)	Denver (22–9–8)	Michigan (22–14–3)	Michigan (22–15–3)	4.
5.	Providence	Providence (0–0–0)	Providence (2–0–0)	Wisconsin (4–1–0)	Wisconsin (5–2–0)	North Dakota (5–2–1)	Harvard (2–1–0)	Cornell (6–0–0) (5)	Clarkson (10–3–1) (3)	Cornell (9–1–0)	North Dakota (10–4–4)	Cornell (10–2–0)	Denver (11–5–4)	Denver (12–6–4) (2)	Denver (12–6–4)	Denver (14–6–4)	Denver (14–6–6)	Minnesota State (21–7–0)	Minnesota State (23–7–0)	Minnesota State (25–7–0)	Denver (17–8–7)	Denver (18–8–8)	Denver (20–9–8)	Ohio State (24–9–5)	Denver (23–10–8)	St. Cloud State (25–9–6)	5.
6.	St. Cloud State	St. Cloud State (0–0–0)	Notre Dame (2–0–0)	Notre Dame (2–1–1)	Boston University (3–2–1)	Providence (5–2–0)	Notre Dame (6–3–1)	Minnesota (7–4–1)	Minnesota (9–4–1) (2)	North Dakota (8–4–4)	Cornell (10–2–0)	North Dakota (10–5–5)	North Dakota (10–5–5)	Minnesota State (16–6–0)	Ohio State (15–5–4)	Ohio State (15–5–4)	Ohio State (17–5–4)	Ohio State (18–6–4)	Ohio State (19–7–4)	Ohio State (19–8–5)	Ohio State (21–8–5)	Ohio State (23–8–5)	Minnesota State (29–9–1)	Minnesota State (29–9–1)	St. Cloud State (25–9–6)	Denver (23–10–8)	6.
7.	North Dakota	North Dakota (0–0–0)	Minnesota (1–1–0)	Minnesota (2–2–0)	Minnesota (3–3–0)	Wisconsin (6–3–0)	Providence (5–3–0)	Clarkson (8–3–1)	Cornell (7–1–0)	Minnesota (9–6–1)	Minnesota (10–7–1)	Minnesota State (11–5–0)	Minnesota State (14–6–0)	Ohio State (14–4–4)	North Dakota (12–6–6)	North Dakota (12–8–6)	Minnesota State (19–7–0)	Clarkson (19–6–3)	Clarkson (19–6–5)	Providence (20–9–4)	Minnesota-Duluth (18–13–3)	Northeastern (21–8–5)	Northeastern (23–8–5)	Providence (23–11–4)	Cornell (25–6–2)	Cornell (25–6–2)	7.
8.	Notre Dame	Notre Dame (0–0–0)	North Dakota (1–0–1)	Boston University (2–2–0)	Notre Dame (3–2–1) т	Minnesota-Duluth (4–2–2)	New Hampshire (6–1–1)	Minnesota State (8–3–0)	Minnesota State (9–4–0)	Western Michigan (9–5–1)	Minnesota State (9–5–0)	Northeastern (10–5–1)	Ohio State (12–4–4)	North Dakota (11–6–5)	Minnesota State (17–7–0)	Minnesota State (18–7–0)	Providence (17–8–3)	North Dakota (12–8–8)	Providence (18–9–4)	Minnesota (19–13–2)	Northeastern (21–8–5)	Clarkson (20–8–6)	Minnesota-Duluth (21–14–3)	Northeastern (23–9–5)	Providence (24–12–4)	Minnesota State (29–10–1)	8.
9.	UMass Lowell	UMass Lowell (0–0–0)	Minnesota-Duluth (1–1–0)	Providence (2–1–0)	Clarkson (3–0–1) т	Minnesota State (5–2–0)	Clarkson (6–3–1)	Providence (6–4–0)	Western Michigan (8–4–1)	Providence (8–5–1)	Providence (9–6–1)	Ohio State (10–4–4)	Northeastern (11–5–2)	Northeastern (12–5–3)	Northeastern (14–5–3)	Northeastern (15–6–3)	Northeastern (15–7–4)	Minnesota (16–13–1)	Minnesota (18–13–1)	Clarkson (19–8–5)	Clarkson (20–8–6)	Minnesota-Duluth (19–14–3)	Providence (22–10–4)	Clarkson (23–10–6)	Minnesota State (29–10–1)	Providence (24–12–4)	9.
10.	Penn State	Wisconsin (1–0–0)	Wisconsin (2–1–0)	Clarkson (3–0–1)	Providence (3–2–0)	Notre Dame (4–3–1)	Wisconsin (6–4–1)	Wisconsin (7–5–1)	Wisconsin (8–5–2)	Minnesota State (9–5–0)	Western Michigan (9–7–1)	Minnesota (10–9–1)	Minnesota (12–9–1)	Providence (14–7–1)	Providence (15–7–2)	Providence (16–8–2)	Minnesota-Duluth (14–11–3)	Providence (17–9–4)	North Dakota (13–9–8)	Northeastern (19–8–5)	Providence (20–10–4)	Providence (20–10–4)	Clarkson (22–9–6)	Michigan (20–14–3)	Northeastern (23–10–5)	Northeastern (23–10–5)	10.
11.	Wisconsin т	Penn State (0–0–0)	Penn State (1–1–0)	Penn State (2–2–0)	Minnesota-Duluth (2–2–2)	Boston University (3–4–1)	Minnesota State (6–3–0)	Harvard (2–3–0)	Providence (7–4–1)	Northeastern (7–4–1)	Northeastern (9–5–1)	Providence (10–7–1)	Providence (12–7–1)	Minnesota (13–10–1)	Western Michigan (12–9–1)	Western Michigan (13–10–1)	North Dakota (12–8–8)	Northeastern (15–7–5)	Northeastern (16–8–5)	Minnesota-Duluth (16–13–3)	Minnesota (19–15–2)	Michigan (20–13–3)	Michigan (20–14–3)	Minnesota-Duluth (21–16–3)	Boston University (22–14–4)	Boston University (22–14–4)	11.
12.	Minnesota-Duluth т	Minnesota-Duluth (0–0–0)	UMass Lowell (0–2–0)	Minnesota State (2–1–0)	New Hampshire (5–1–0)	Quinnipiac (3–1–1)	Cornell (4–0–0)	New Hampshire (6–3–1)	Northeastern (7–4–1)	Wisconsin (9–6–2)	Wisconsin (10–7–2)	Western Michigan (10–8–1)	Western Michigan (11–8–1)	Western Michigan (11–8–1)	Penn State (13–8–3)	Penn State (13–10–3)	Minnesota (16–13–1)	Minnesota-Duluth (14–13–3)	Minnesota-Duluth (14–13–3)	North Dakota (14–10–8)	Michigan (18–13–3)	Penn State (18–13–5)	Penn State (18–14–5)	Penn State (18–14–5)	Clarkson (23–11–6)	Clarkson (23–11–6)	12.
13.	Quinnipiac	Northeastern (0–0–0)	Michigan Tech (2–1–0)	Minnesota-Duluth (1–2–1)	Quinnipiac (3–1–1)	New Hampshire (5–1–1)	Northeastern (5–2–1)	Northeastern (6–3–1)	Boston College (8–5–1)	Ohio State (8–3–3)	Ohio State (8–4–4)	Penn State (11–7–2)	Penn State (11–7–2)	Penn State (12–7–3)	Minnesota-Duluth (11–9–3)	Minnesota-Duluth (13–9–3)	Omaha (14–11–1)	Omaha (14–13–1)	Omaha (14–13–1)	Michigan (16–13–3)	Penn State (16–13–5)	Omaha (17–15–2)	North Dakota (16–12–10)	Boston University (21–13–4)	Penn State (18–15–5)	Penn State (18–15–5)	13.
14.	Northeastern	Quinnipiac (0–0–0)	Northeastern (2–0–0)	Northeastern (2–0–1)	Minnesota State (3–2–0)	Clarkson (4–3–1)	Minnesota-Duluth (4–4–2)	Western Michigan (6–4–1)	New Hampshire (6–4–1)	New Hampshire (7–4–1)	Boston College (9–6–2)	Boston College (9–7–2)	Boston College (10–7–2)	Bowling Green (12–6–6)	Minnesota (13–12–1)	Minnesota (15–12–1)	Bowling Green (16–8–6)	Western Michigan (14–13–1)	Bowling Green (17–9–6)	Omaha (15–14–1)	North Dakota (14–11–9)	Minnesota (19–17–2)	Minnesota (19–17–2)	North Dakota (17–13–10)	Air Force (23–15–5)	Air Force (23–15–5)	14.
15.	Minnesota State	Minnesota State (0–0–0)	Clarkson (2–0–0)	Boston College (1–1–1)	Penn State (3–3–0)	Northeastern (4–2–1)	Western Michigan (5–3–1)	Minnesota-Duluth (5–5–2)	Minnesota-Duluth (6–6–2)	Minnesota-Duluth (7–6–2)	New Hampshire (8–6–1)	Wisconsin (10–9–2)	Wisconsin (10–9–2)	Minnesota-Duluth (9–9–3)	Omaha (12–9–1)	Omaha (12–11–1)	Boston College (13–10–3)	Bowling Green (17–9–6)	Western Michigan (14–13–1)	Bowling Green (19–9–6)	Omaha (16–14–2)	Union (21–13–2)	Boston College (20–13–3)	Minnesota (19–17–2)	Michigan Tech (22–17–5)	Michigan Tech (23–15–5)	15.
	Preseason Sep 25	Week 1 Oct 2	Week 2 Oct 9	Week 3 Oct 16	Week 4 Oct 23	Week 5 Oct 30	Week 6 Nov 6	Week 7 Nov 13	Week 8 Nov 20	Week 9 Nov 27	Week 10 Dec 4	Week 11 Dec 11	Week 12 Jan 2	Week 13 Jan 8	Week 14 Jan 15	Week 15 Jan 22	Week 16 Jan 29	Week 17 Feb 5	Week 18 Feb 12	Week 19 Feb 19	Week 20 Feb 26	Week 21 Mar 5	Week 22 Mar 12	Week 23 Mar 19	Week 24 Mar 26	Final Apr 9	
		None	Dropped: Quinnipiac; Minnesota State	Dropped: UMass Lowell; Michigan Tech	Dropped: Northeastern; Boston College	Dropped: Penn State	Dropped: Boston University; Quinnipiac	None	Dropped: Harvard	Dropped: Boston College	Dropped: Minnesota-Duluth	Dropped: New Hampshire	None	Dropped: Boston College; Wisconsin	Dropped: Bowling Green	None	Dropped: Western Michigan; Penn State	Dropped: Boston College	None	Dropped: Western Michigan	Dropped: Bowling Green	Dropped: North Dakota	Dropped: Omaha; Union	Dropped: Boston College	Dropped: North Dakota; Minnesota	None	
